= Weightlifting at the 1980 Summer Olympics =

Weightlifting at the Games of the XXII Olympiad
- Venue: Izmailovo Sports Palace
- Dates: 20–30 July 1980
- Competitors: 172 from 39 nations

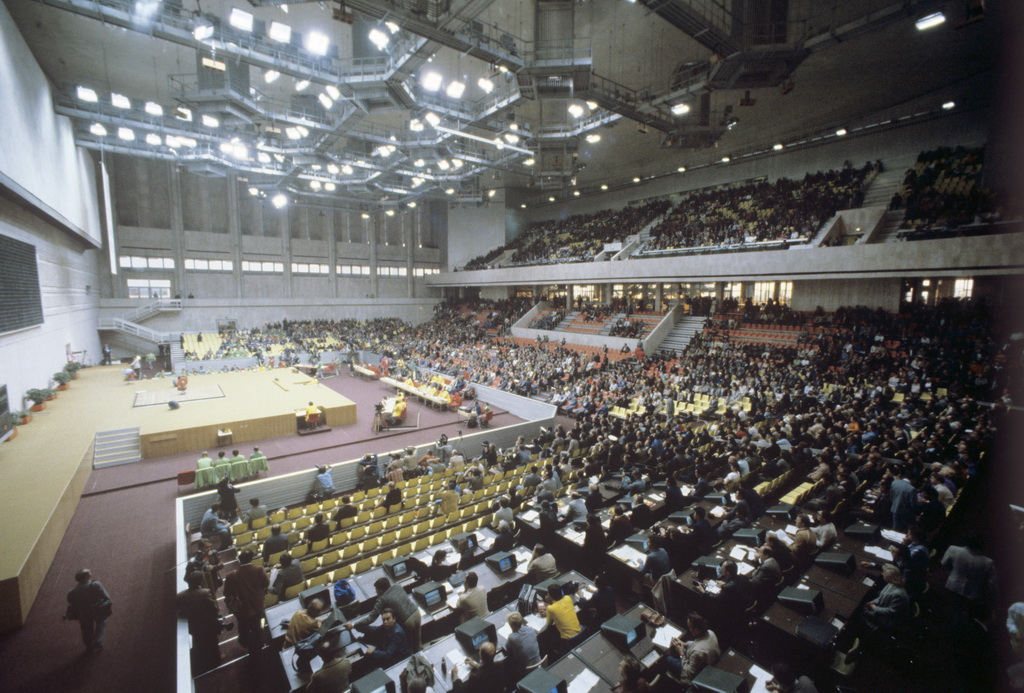
Venue of the competition as it appeared during the Games. RIAN photo.

Weightlifting at the 1980 Summer Olympics was represented by ten events (all — men's individual), held between 20 and 30 July at the Izmailovo Sports Palace, situated alongside the Izmailovo Park (eastern part of Moscow).

== Medal summary ==
Games	Gold	Silver	Bronze
52 kg	Kanybek Osmonaliyev; Soviet Union	Ho Bong-chol; North Korea	Han Gyong-si; North Korea
56 kg	Daniel Núñez; Cuba	Yurik Sarkisyan; Soviet Union	Tadeusz Dembończyk; Poland
60 kg	Viktor Mazin; Soviet Union	Stefan Dimitrov; Bulgaria	Marek Seweryn; Poland
67.5 kg	Yanko Rusev; Bulgaria	Joachim Kunz; East Germany	Mincho Pashov; Bulgaria
75 kg	Asen Zlatev; Bulgaria	Aleksandr Pervi; Soviet Union	Nedelcho Kolev; Bulgaria
82.5 kg	Yurik Vardanyan; Soviet Union	Blagoy Blagoev; Bulgaria	Dušan Poliačik; Czechoslovakia
90 kg	Péter Baczakó; Hungary	Rumen Aleksandrov; Bulgaria	Frank Mantek; East Germany
100 kg	Ota Zaremba; Czechoslovakia	Igor Nikitin; Soviet Union	Alberto Blanco; Cuba
110 kg	Leonid Taranenko; Soviet Union	Valentin Khristov; Bulgaria	György Szalai; Hungary
+110 kg	Sultan Rakhmanov; Soviet Union	Jürgen Heuser; East Germany	Tadeusz Rutkowski; Poland

== Medal table ==
Rank	Nation	Gold	Silver	Bronze	Total
1	Soviet Union	5	3	0	8
2	Bulgaria	2	4	2	8
3	Cuba	1	0	1	2
3	Czechoslovakia	1	0	1	2
3	Hungary	1	0	1	2
6	East Germany	0	2	1	3
7	North Korea	0	1	1	2
8	Poland	0	0	3	3
Totals (8 entries)		10	10	10	30

== Results ==
=== 52 kg ===
Final; Rank	Athlete	Country	Snatch	Cl.&J	Total
1	Kanybek Osmonaliyev	USSR	107.5	137.5	245.0 (OR)
2	Ho Bong Chol	DPR Korea	110.0	135.0	245.0
3	Gyong Si Han	DPR Korea	110.0	135.0	245.0
4	Bela Olah	Hungary	110.0	135.0	245.0
5	Stefan Leletko	Poland	105.0	135.0	240.0
6	Ferenc Hornyak	Hungary	107.5	130.0	237.5

=== 56 kg ===
Final; Rank	Athlete	Country	Snatch	Cl.&J	Total
1	Daniel Núñez	Cuba	125.0	150.0	275.0 (WR, OR)
2	Yurik Sarkisyan	USSR	112.5	157.5	270.0 (JWR)
3	Tadeusz Dembonczyk	Poland	120.0	145.0	265.0
4	Andreas Letz	GDR	115.0	150.0	265.0
5	Eui Yong Yang	D.P.R.Korea	112.5	150.0	262.5
6	Imre Stefanovics	Hungary	115.0	145.0	260.0

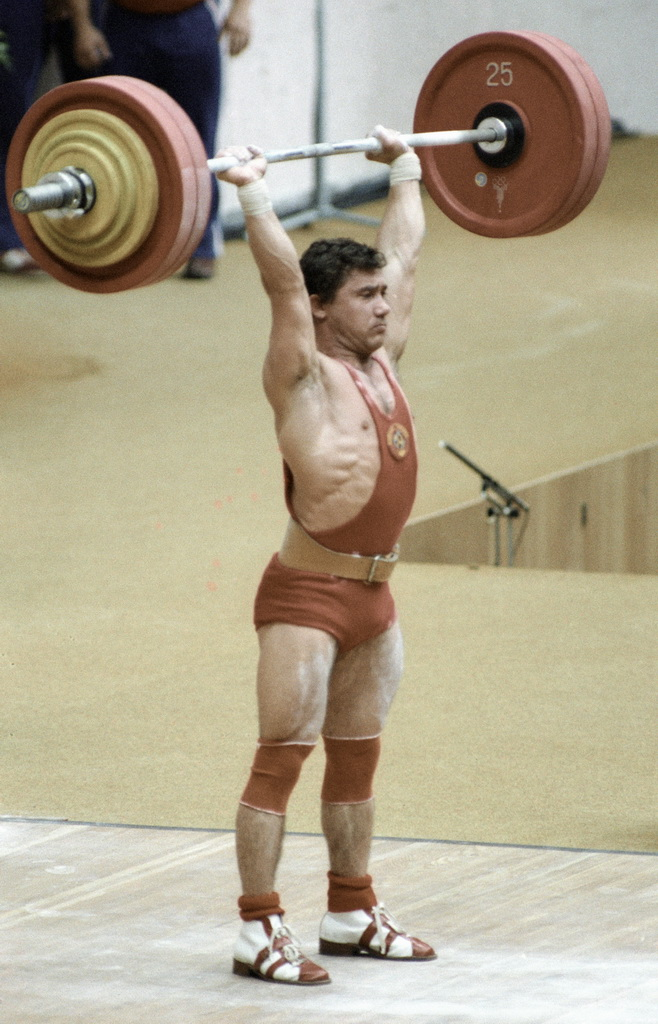
Viktor Mazin during his gold medal performance. RIAN photo.

=== 60 kg ===
Final; Rank	Athlete	Country	Snatch	Cl.&J	Total
1	Viktor Mazin	USSR	130.0	160.0	290.0 (OR)
2	Stefan Dimitrov	Bulgaria	127.5	160.0	287.5
3	Marek Seweryn	Poland	127.5	155.0	282.5
4	Antoni Pawlak	Poland	120.0	155.0	275.0
5	Julio Loscos	Cuba	125.0	150.0	275.0
6	Frantisek Nedved	Czechoslovakia	122.5	150.0	272.5

=== 67.5 kg ===
Final; Rank	Athlete	Country	Snatch	Cl.&J	Total
1	Yanko Rusev	Bulgaria	147.5	195.0	342.5 (WR, OR)
2	Joachim Kunz	GDR	145.0	190.0	335.0
3	Mincho Pachov	Bulgaria	142.5	182.5	325.0
4	Daniel Senet	France	147.5	175.0	322.5
5	Gunter Ambrass	GDR	140.0	180.0	320.0
6	Zbigniew Kaczmarek	Poland	140.0	177.5	317.5

=== 75 kg ===
Final; Rank	Athlete	Country	Snatch	Cl.&J	Total
1	Asen Zlatev	Bulgaria	160.0	200.0	360.0 (WR, OR)
2	Aleksandr Pervi	USSR	157.5	200.0	357.5
3	Nedeltcho Kolev	Bulgaria	157.5	187.5	345.0
4	Julio Echenique	Cuba	145.0	182.5	327.5
5	Oragomir Ciorolan	Romania	140.0	182.5	322.5
6	Tapio Kinnunen	Finland	142.5	177.5	320.0

=== 82.5 kg ===
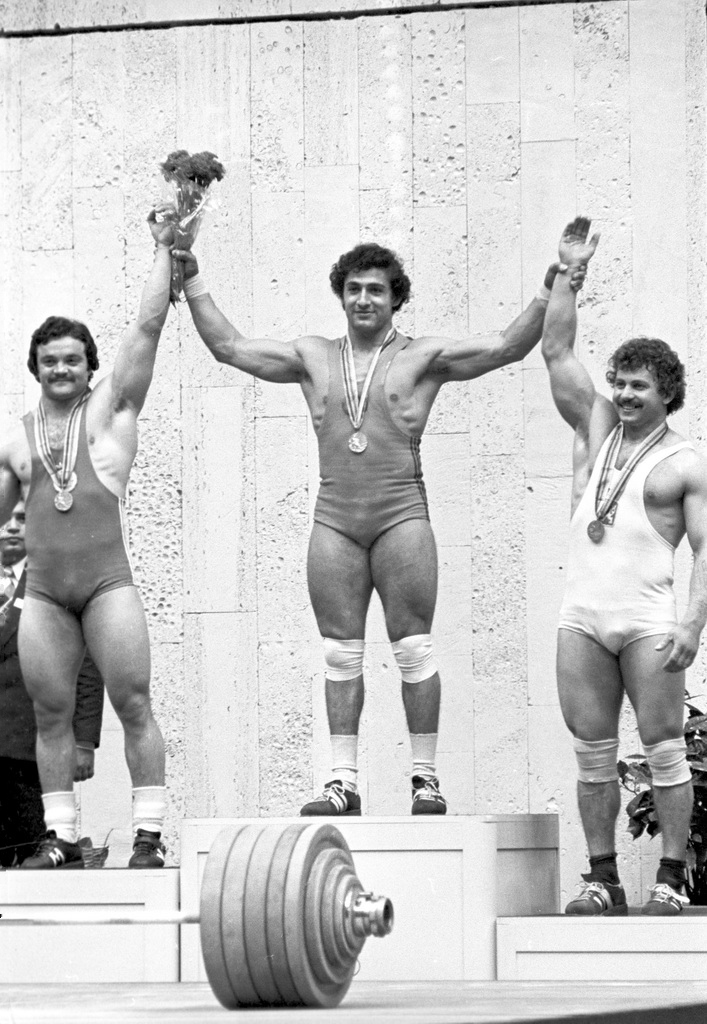
XXII Olympic Games. Winners of the weightlifting competition, 82.5 kg division. RIAN photo.

Final; Rank	Athlete	Country	Snatch	Cl.&J	Total
1	Yurik Vardanyan	USSR	177.5	222.5	400.0 (WR, OR)
2	Blagoi Blagoev	Bulgaria	175.0	197.5	372.5
3	Dusan Poliacik	Czechoslovakia	160.0	207.5	367.5
4	Jan Lisowski	Poland	150.0	205.0	355.0
5	Krasimir Drandarov	Bulgaria	155.0	200.0	355.0
6	Pawel Rabczewski	Poland	155.0	195.0	350.0

=== 90 kg ===
Final; Rank	Athlete	Country	Snatch	Cl.&J	Total
1	Peter Baczako	Hungary	170.0	207.5	377.5
2	Rumen Aleksandrov	Bulgaria	170.0	205.0	375.0
3	Frank Mantek	GDR	165.0	205.0	370.0
4	Dalibor Řehak	Czechoslovakia	165.0	200.0	365.0
5	Witold Walo	Poland	160.0	200.0	360.0
6	Lubomir Sršeň	Czechoslovakia	160.0	197.5	357.5
7	Vasile Groapă	Romania	160.0	195.0	355.0
8	Nikolaos Iliadis	Greece	150.0	195.0	345.0
9	Gary Langford	Great Britain	150.0	180.0	330.0
10	Norberto Oberburger	Italy	147.5	167.5	315.0
11	Luis Rosito	Guatemala	132.5	175.0	322.5
12	Victor Ruiz	Mexico	135.0	165.0	300.0
13	Guðmundur Helgason	Iceland	135.0	160.0	295.0
-	David Rigert	USSR	0	-	NM
-	Hugo De Grauwe	Belgium	0	-	NM
-	Sann Myint	Burma	0	-	NM
-	Ferenc Antalovics	Hungary	165.0	0	NM
-	Luigi Fratangelo	Australia	142.0	0	NM

=== 100 kg ===
Final; Rank	Athlete	Country	Snatch	Cl.&J	Total
1	Ota Zaremba	Czechoslovakia	180.0	215.0	395.0 (OR)
2	Igor Nikitin	USSR	177.5	215.0	392.5
3	Alberto Blanco	Cuba	172.5	212.5	385.0
4	Michael Hennig	GDR	165.0	217.5	382.5
5	Janos Solyomvari	Hungary	175.0	205.0	380.0
6	Manfred Funke	GDR	170.0	207.5	377.5

=== 110 kg ===
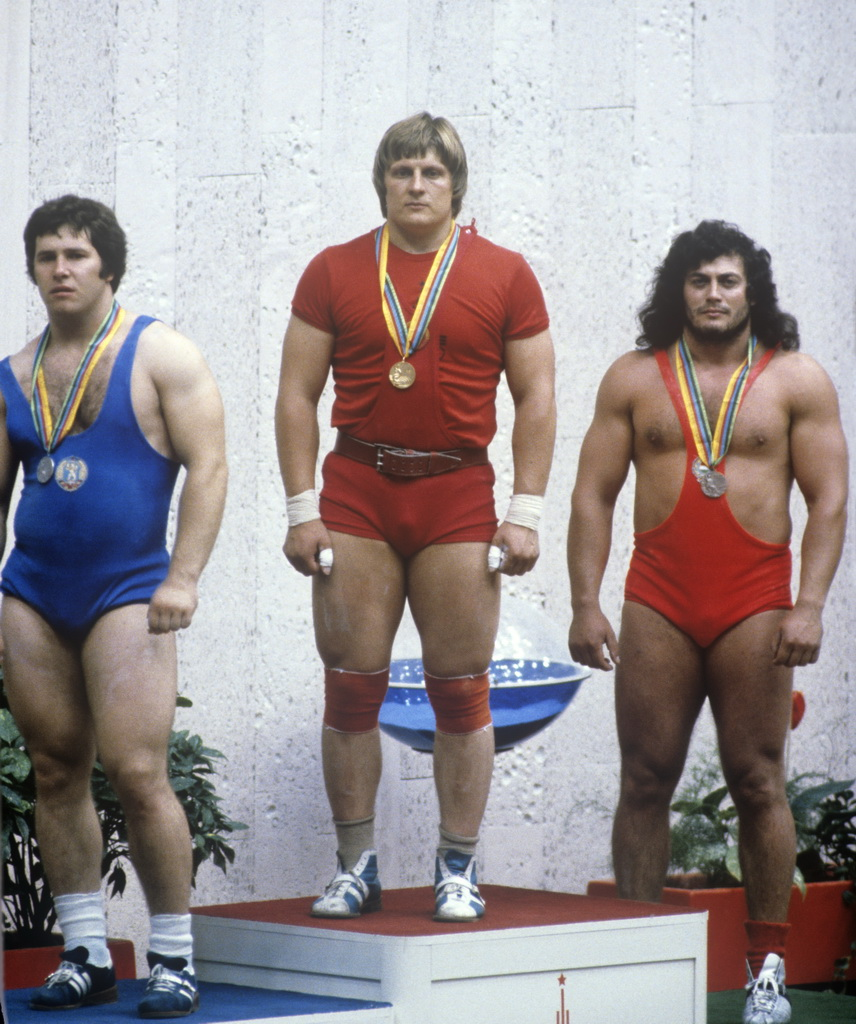
XXII Olympic Games. Winners of the weightlifting competition, 110 kg division. RIAN photo.

Final; Rank	Athlete	Country	Snatch	Cl.&J	Total
1	Leonid Taranenko	USSR	182.5	240.0	422.5 (WR, OR)
2	Valentin Khristov	Bulgaria	185.0	220.0	405.0
3	György Szalai	Hungary	172.5	217.5	390.0
4	Leif Nilsson	Sweden	167.5	212.5	380.0
5	Vinzenz Hortnagl	Austria	170.0	202.5	372.5
6	Stefan Tasnadi	Romania	165.0	195.0	360.0

=== +110 kg ===
Final; Rank	Athlete	Country	Snatch	Cl.&J	Total
1	Sultan Rakhmanov	USSR	195.0	245.0	440.0
2	Jurgen Heuser	GDR	182.5	227.5	410.0
3	Tadeusz Rutkowski	Poland	180.0	227.5	407.5
4	Rudolf Strejcek	Czechoslovakia	182.5	220.0	402.5
5	Bohuslav Braum	Czechoslovakia	180.0	217.5	397.5
6	Francisco Mendez	Cuba	175.0	220.0	395.0

Remarks:

- All weights are given in kilograms
- WR=World Record, OR=Olympic Record, JWR=Junior World Record
- Country names in the medal table are not given in the form they were used in the official documents of the IOC in 1980
