= 1982 European Weightlifting Championships =

International weightlifting competition

1982 European Championships

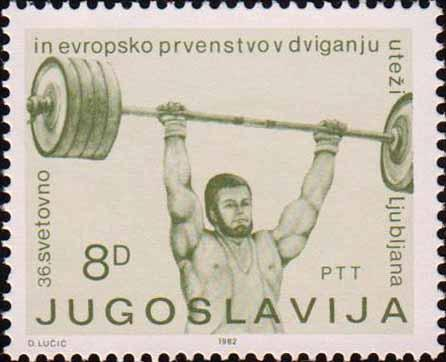
Yugoslav stamp dedicated to the championships

The 1982 European Weightlifting Championships were held in Hala Tivoli, Ljubljana, SFR Yugoslavia from September 18 to September 26, 1982. This was the 61st edition of the event. There were 138 men in action from 25 nations. This tournament was a part of 1982 World Weightlifting Championships.

== Medal summary ==
Event	Gold		Silver		Bronze	
52 kg
Snatch	Jacek Gutowski; Poland	115.0 kg WR	Lubomir Khadzhiev; Bulgaria	107.5 kg	Stefan Leletko; Poland	107.5 kg
Clean & Jerk	Stefan Leletko; Poland	142.5 kg	Yenia Sarandaliev; Bulgaria	137.5 kg	Lubomir Khadzhiev; Bulgaria	135.0 kg
Total	Stefan Leletko; Poland	250.0 kg	Yenia Sarandaliev; Bulgaria	245.0 kg	Jacek Gutowski; Poland	245.0 kg
56 kg
Snatch	Anton Kodzhabashev; Bulgaria	125.0 kg	Frank Mavius; East Germany	120.0 kg	Oksen Mirzoyan; Soviet Union	120.0 kg
Clean & Jerk	Anton Kodzhabashev; Bulgaria	155.0 kg	Oksen Mirzoyan; Soviet Union	152.5 kg	Andreas Letz; East Germany	147.5 kg
Total	Anton Kodzhabashev; Bulgaria	280.0 kg WR	Oksen Mirzoyan; Soviet Union	272.5 kg	Tadeusz Golik; Poland	270.0 kg
60 kg
Snatch	Andreas Behm; East Germany	135.0 kg	Yurik Sarkisyan; Soviet Union	132.5 kg	Wiesław Pawluk; Poland	125.0 kg
Clean & Jerk	Yurik Sarkisyan; Soviet Union	170.0 kg	Andreas Behm; East Germany	165.0 kg	Wiesław Pawluk; Poland	160.0 kg
Total	Yurik Sarkisyan; Soviet Union	302.5 kg	Andreas Behm; East Germany	300.0 kg	Wiesław Pawluk; Poland	285.0 kg
67.5 kg
Snatch	Piotr Mandra; Poland	150.0 kg	Virgil Dociu; Romania	140.0 kg	Gregor Bialowas; Austria	135.0 kg
Clean & Jerk	Joachim Kunz; East Germany	177.5 kg	Piotr Mandra; Poland	175.0 kg	Virgil Dociu; Romania	170.0 kg
Total	Piotr Mandra; Poland	325.0 kg	Virgil Dociu; Romania	310.0 kg	Gregor Bialowas; Austria	292.5 kg
75 kg
Snatch	Yanko Rusev; Bulgaria	157.5 kg	Vladimir Mikhalev; Soviet Union	152.5 kg	Edward Kulis; Poland	150.0 kg
Clean & Jerk	Yanko Rusev; Bulgaria	207.5 kg	Mincho Pashov; Bulgaria	207.5 kg	Karl-Heinz Radschinsky; West Germany	192.5 kg
Total	Yanko Rusev; Bulgaria	365.0 kg WR	Mincho Pashov; Bulgaria	357.5 kg	Vladimir Mikhalev; Soviet Union	345.0 kg
82.5 kg
Snatch	Asen Zlatev; Bulgaria	180.0 kg WR	Aleksandr Pervy; Soviet Union	175.0 kg	Janusz Alchimowicz; Poland	160.0 kg
Clean & Jerk	Asen Zlatev; Bulgaria	220.0 kg	Aleksandr Pervy; Soviet Union	217.5 kg	Horst Appel; East Germany	195.0 kg
Total	Asen Zlatev; Bulgaria	400.0 kg	Aleksandr Pervy; Soviet Union	392.5 kg	Bertalan Mandzák; Hungary	350.0 kg
90 kg
Snatch	Blagoy Blagoev; Bulgaria	192.5 kg WR	Yurik Vardanyan; Soviet Union	185.0 kg	Péter Baczakó; Hungary	170.0 kg
Clean & Jerk	Blagoy Blagoev; Bulgaria	222.5 kg	Andrzej Piotrowski; Poland	212.5 kg	Yurik Vardanyan; Soviet Union	210.0 kg
Total	Blagoy Blagoev; Bulgaria	415.0 kg WR	Yurik Vardanyan; Soviet Union	395.0 kg	Frank Mantek; East Germany	377.5 kg
100 kg
Snatch	Yury Zakharevich; Soviet Union	195.0 kg	Viktor Sots; Soviet Union	190.0 kg	Bruno Matykiewicz; Czechoslovakia	180.0 kg
Clean & Jerk	Viktor Sots; Soviet Union	232.5 kg	Yury Zakharevich; Soviet Union	225.0 kg	Bruno Matykiewicz; Czechoslovakia	217.5 kg
Total	Viktor Sots; Soviet Union	422.5 kg	Yury Zakharevich; Soviet Union	420.0 kg	Bruno Matykiewicz; Czechoslovakia	397.5 kg
110 kg
Snatch	Sergey Arakelov; Soviet Union	190.0 kg	Vyacheslav Klokov; Soviet Union	190.0 kg	Yordan Chalakov; Bulgaria	180.0 kg
Clean & Jerk	Sergey Arakelov; Soviet Union	237.5 kg	Vyacheslav Klokov; Soviet Union	237.5 kg	Anton Baraniak; Czechoslovakia	230.0 kg
Total	Sergey Arakelov; Soviet Union	427.5 kg	Vyacheslav Klokov; Soviet Union	427.5 kg	Anton Baraniak; Czechoslovakia	405.0 kg
+110 kg
Snatch	Antonio Krastev; Bulgaria	200.0 kg	Anatoly Pisarenko; Soviet Union	197.5 kg	Pavel Khek; Czechoslovakia	192.5 kg
Clean & Jerk	Anatoly Pisarenko; Soviet Union	247.5 kg	Antonio Krastev; Bulgaria	242.5 kg	Bohuslav Braum; Czechoslovakia	230.0 kg
Total	Anatoly Pisarenko; Soviet Union	445.0 kg	Antonio Krastev; Bulgaria	442.5 kg	Bohuslav Braum; Czechoslovakia	420.0 kg

== Medal table ==
Ranking by Big (Total result) medals

Rank	Nation	Gold	Silver	Bronze	Total
1	Soviet Union (URS)	4	5	1	10
2	Bulgaria (BUL)	4	3	0	7
3	Poland (POL)	2	0	3	5
4	East Germany (GDR)	0	1	1	2
5	Romania (ROU)	0	1	0	1
6	Czechoslovakia (TCH)	0	0	3	3
7	Austria (AUT)	0	0	1	1
7	Hungary (HUN)	0	0	1	1
Totals (8 entries)		10	10	10	30
