= 1981 European Weightlifting Championships =

International weightlifting competition

1981 European Championships

The 1981 European Weightlifting Championships were held in Lille, France, from September 13 to September 20, 1981. This was the 60th edition of the event. There were 149 men in action from 25 nations. This tournament was a part of 1981 World Weightlifting Championships.

== Medal summary ==
Event	Gold		Silver		Bronze	
52 kg
Snatch	Kanybek Osmonaliyev; Soviet Union	110.0 kg	Jacek Gutowski; Poland	110.0 kg	Bela Olah; Hungary	105.0 kg
Clean & Jerk	Kanybek Osmonaliyev; Soviet Union	137.5 kg	Jacek Gutowski; Poland	130.0 kg	Bela Olah; Hungary	130.0 kg
Total	Kanybek Osmonaliyev; Soviet Union	247.5 kg	Jacek Gutowski; Poland	240.0 kg	Bela Olah; Hungary	235.0 kg
56 kg
Snatch	Andreas Letz; East Germany	120.0 kg	Anton Kodzhabashev; Bulgaria	117.5 kg	Nikolay Zakharov; Soviet Union	117.5 kg
Clean & Jerk	Anton Kodzhabashev; Bulgaria	155.0 kg	Andreas Letz; East Germany	152.5 kg	Nikolay Zakharov; Soviet Union	147.5 kg
Total	Anton Kodzhabashev; Bulgaria	272.5 kg	Andreas Letz; East Germany	272.5 kg	Nikolay Zakharov; Soviet Union	265.0 kg
60 kg
Snatch	Beloslav Manolov; Bulgaria	132.5 kg	Yurik Sarkisyan; Soviet Union	130.0 kg	Wiesław Pawluk; Poland	127.5 kg
Clean & Jerk	Beloslav Manolov; Bulgaria	170.0 kg WR	Yurik Sarkisyan; Soviet Union	165.0 kg	Andreas Behm; East Germany	157.5 kg
Total	Beloslav Manolov; Bulgaria	302.5 kg WR	Yurik Sarkisyan; Soviet Union	295.0 kg	Andreas Behm; East Germany	282.5 kg
67.5 kg
Snatch	Daniel Senet; France	150.0 kg	Joachim Kunz; East Germany	150.0 kg	Mincho Pashov; Bulgaria	147.5 kg
Clean & Jerk	Joachim Kunz; East Germany	190.0 kg	Mincho Pashov; Bulgaria	182.5 kg	Karl-Heinz Radschinsky; West Germany	175.0 kg
Total	Joachim Kunz; East Germany	340.0 kg	Mincho Pashov; Bulgaria	330.0 kg	Daniel Senet; France	320.0 kg
75 kg
Snatch	Yanko Rusev; Bulgaria	157.5 kg	Aleksandr Pervy; Soviet Union	155.0 kg	Jürgen Negwer; West Germany	150.0 kg
Clean & Jerk	Yanko Rusev; Bulgaria	202.5 kg	Aleksandr Pervy; Soviet Union	202.5 kg	Hermann Kubenka; East Germany	190.0 kg
Total	Yanko Rusev; Bulgaria	360.0 kg WR	Aleksandr Pervy; Soviet Union	357.5 kg	Jürgen Negwer; West Germany	340.0 kg
82.5 kg
Snatch	Yurik Vardanyan; Soviet Union	170.0 kg	Asen Zlatev; Bulgaria	170.0 kg	Janusz Alchimowicz; Poland	160.0 kg
Clean & Jerk	Yurik Vardanyan; Soviet Union	222.5 kg	Dušan Poliačik; Czechoslovakia	210.0 kg	Asen Zlatev; Bulgaria	202.5 kg
Total	Yurik Vardanyan; Soviet Union	392.5 kg	Asen Zlatev; Bulgaria	372.5 kg	Dušan Poliačik; Czechoslovakia	367.5 kg
90 kg
Snatch	Blagoy Blagoev; Bulgaria	185.0 kg WR	Yury Zakharevich; Soviet Union	180.0 kg	Andrzej Piotrowski; Poland	167.5 kg
Clean & Jerk	Blagoy Blagoev; Bulgaria	220.0 kg	Yury Zakharevich; Soviet Union	217.5 kg	Lubomir Usherov; Bulgaria	212.5 kg
Total	Blagoy Blagoev; Bulgaria	405.0 kg WR	Yury Zakharevich; Soviet Union	397.5 kg	Lubomir Usherov; Bulgaria	380.0 kg
100 kg
Snatch	Viktor Sots; Soviet Union	182.5 kg	András Hlavati; Hungary	177.5 kg	Bruno Matykiewicz; Czechoslovakia	175.0 kg
Clean & Jerk	Viktor Sots; Soviet Union	225.0 kg	Veselin Osikovski; Bulgaria	217.5 kg	Bruno Matykiewicz; Czechoslovakia	217.5 kg
Total	Viktor Sots; Soviet Union	407.5 kg	Bruno Matykiewicz; Czechoslovakia	392.5 kg	Veselin Osikovski; Bulgaria	387.5 kg
110 kg
Snatch	Vyacheslav Klokov; Soviet Union	185.0 kg	Valery Kravchuk; Soviet Union	180.0 kg	Plamen Asparukhov; Bulgaria	180.0 kg
Clean & Jerk	Valery Kravchuk; Soviet Union	235.0 kg	Anton Baraniak; Czechoslovakia	227.5 kg	Plamen Asparukhov; Bulgaria	225.0 kg
Total	Valery Kravchuk; Soviet Union	415.0 kg	Vyacheslav Klokov; Soviet Union	410.0 kg	Plamen Asparukhov; Bulgaria	405.0 kg
+110 kg
Snatch	Anatoly Pisarenko; Soviet Union	187.5 kg	Rudolf Strejček; Czechoslovakia	187.5 kg	Antonio Krastev; Bulgaria	185.0 kg
Clean & Jerk	Anatoly Pisarenko; Soviet Union	237.5 kg	Senno Salzwedel; East Germany	237.5 kg	Tadeusz Rutkowski; Poland	232.5 kg
Total	Anatoly Pisarenko; Soviet Union	425.0 kg	Senno Salzwedel; East Germany	417.5 kg	Tadeusz Rutkowski; Poland	415.0 kg

== Medal table ==
Ranking by Big (Total result) medals

Rank	Nation	Gold	Silver	Bronze	Total
1	Soviet Union (URS)	5	4	1	10
2	Bulgaria (BUL)	4	2	3	9
3	East Germany (GDR)	1	2	1	4
4	Czechoslovakia (TCH)	0	1	1	2
4	Poland (POL)	0	1	1	2
6	France (FRA)	0	0	1	1
6	Hungary (HUN)	0	0	1	1
6	West Germany (FRG)	0	0	1	1
Totals (8 entries)		10	10	10	30
