= 1980 World Weightlifting Championships =

International weightlifting competition

1980 Men's World Championships
- Host city: Moscow, Soviet Union
- Dates: 20–30 July 1980

The 1980 Men's World Weightlifting Championships were held in Moscow, Soviet Union from July 20 to July 30, 1980. There were 173 men in action from 40 nations.

This tournament was a part of 1980 Summer Olympics but counted as World Weightlifting Championships too. Only total medals counted for Olympic Games while Snatch and Clean & Jerk medals counts for World Weightlifting Championships.

== Medal summary ==
Event	Gold		Silver		Bronze	
52 kg
Snatch	Ho Bong-chol; North Korea	110.0 kg	Han Gyong-si; North Korea	110.0 kg	Béla Oláh; Hungary	110.0 kg
Clean & Jerk	Kanybek Osmonaliyev; Soviet Union	137.5 kg	Stefan Leletko; Poland	135.0 kg	Ho Bong-chol; North Korea	135.0 kg
Total	Kanybek Osmonaliyev; Soviet Union	245.0 kg	Ho Bong-chol; North Korea	245.0 kg	Han Gyong-si; North Korea	245.0 kg
56 kg
Snatch	Daniel Núñez; Cuba	125.0 kg WR	Tadeusz Dembończyk; Poland	120.0 kg	Imre Stefanovics; Hungary	115.0 kg
Clean & Jerk	Yurik Sarkisyan; Soviet Union	157.5 kg WR	Andreas Letz; East Germany	150.0 kg	Daniel Núñez; Cuba	150.0 kg
Total	Daniel Núñez; Cuba	275.0 kg WR	Yurik Sarkisyan; Soviet Union	270.0 kg	Tadeusz Dembończyk; Poland	265.0 kg
60 kg
Snatch	Viktor Mazin; Soviet Union	130.0 kg	Stefan Dimitrov; Bulgaria	127.5 kg	Marek Seweryn; Poland	127.5 kg
Clean & Jerk	Stefan Dimitrov; Bulgaria	160.0 kg	Viktor Mazin; Soviet Union	160.0 kg	Marek Seweryn; Poland	155.0 kg
Total	Viktor Mazin; Soviet Union	290.0 kg	Stefan Dimitrov; Bulgaria	287.5 kg	Marek Seweryn; Poland	282.5 kg
67.5 kg
Snatch	Yanko Rusev; Bulgaria	147.5 kg	Daniel Senet; France	147.5 kg	Joachim Kunz; East Germany	145.0 kg
Clean & Jerk	Yanko Rusev; Bulgaria	195.0 kg WR	Joachim Kunz; East Germany	190.0 kg	Mincho Pashov; Bulgaria	182.5 kg
Total	Yanko Rusev; Bulgaria	342.5 kg WR	Joachim Kunz; East Germany	335.0 kg	Mincho Pashov; Bulgaria	325.0 kg
75 kg
Snatch	Asen Zlatev; Bulgaria	160.0 kg	Nedelcho Kolev; Bulgaria	157.5 kg	Aleksandr Pervy; Soviet Union	157.5 kg
Clean & Jerk	Aleksandr Pervy; Soviet Union	200.0 kg	Asen Zlatev; Bulgaria	200.0 kg	Nedelcho Kolev; Bulgaria	187.5 kg
Total	Asen Zlatev; Bulgaria	360.0 kg WR	Aleksandr Pervy; Soviet Union	357.5 kg	Nedelcho Kolev; Bulgaria	345.0 kg
82.5 kg
Snatch	Yurik Vardanyan; Soviet Union	177.5 kg WR	Blagoy Blagoev; Bulgaria	175.0 kg	Dušan Poliačik; Czechoslovakia	160.0 kg
Clean & Jerk	Yurik Vardanyan; Soviet Union	222.5 kg WR	Dušan Poliačik; Czechoslovakia	207.5 kg	Jan Lisowski; Poland	205.0 kg
Total	Yurik Vardanyan; Soviet Union	400.0 kg WR	Blagoy Blagoev; Bulgaria	372.5 kg	Dušan Poliačik; Czechoslovakia	367.5 kg
90 kg
Snatch	Péter Baczakó; Hungary	170.0 kg	Rumen Aleksandrov; Bulgaria	170.0 kg	Frank Mantek; East Germany	165.0 kg
Clean & Jerk	Péter Baczakó; Hungary	207.5 kg	Frank Mantek; East Germany	205.0 kg	Rumen Aleksandrov; Bulgaria	205.0 kg
Total	Péter Baczakó; Hungary	377.5 kg	Rumen Aleksandrov; Bulgaria	375.0 kg	Frank Mantek; East Germany	370.0 kg
100 kg
Snatch	Ota Zaremba; Czechoslovakia	180.0 kg	Igor Nikitin; Soviet Union	177.5 kg	János Sólyomvári; Hungary	175.0 kg
Clean & Jerk	Michael Hennig; East Germany	217.5 kg	Ota Zaremba; Czechoslovakia	215.0 kg	Igor Nikitin; Soviet Union	215.0 kg
Total	Ota Zaremba; Czechoslovakia	395.0 kg	Igor Nikitin; Soviet Union	392.5 kg	Alberto Blanco; Cuba	385.0 kg
110 kg
Snatch	Valentin Hristov; Bulgaria	185.0 kg	Leonid Taranenko; Soviet Union	182.5 kg	György Szalai; Hungary	172.5 kg
Clean & Jerk	Leonid Taranenko; Soviet Union	240.0 kg WR	Valentin Hristov; Bulgaria	220.0 kg	György Szalai; Hungary	217.5 kg
Total	Leonid Taranenko; Soviet Union	422.5 kg WR	Valentin Hristov; Bulgaria	405.0 kg	György Szalai; Hungary	390.0 kg
+110 kg
Snatch	Sultan Rakhmanov; Soviet Union	195.0 kg	Rudolf Strejček; Czechoslovakia	182.5 kg	Jürgen Heuser; East Germany	182.5 kg
Clean & Jerk	Sultan Rakhmanov; Soviet Union	245.0 kg	Tadeusz Rutkowski; Poland	227.5 kg	Jürgen Heuser; East Germany	227.5 kg
Total	Sultan Rakhmanov; Soviet Union	440.0 kg	Jürgen Heuser; East Germany	410.0 kg	Tadeusz Rutkowski; Poland	407.5 kg

== Medal table ==
Ranking by Big (Total result) medals

Rank	Nation	Gold	Silver	Bronze	Total
1	Soviet Union	5	3	0	8
2	Bulgaria	2	4	2	8
3	Cuba	1	0	1	2
3	Czechoslovakia	1	0	1	2
3	Hungary	1	0	1	2
6	East Germany	0	2	1	3
7	North Korea	0	1	1	2
8	Poland	0	0	3	3
Totals (8 entries)		10	10	10	30

Ranking by all medals: Big (Total result) and Small (Snatch and Clean & Jerk)

Rank	Nation	Gold	Silver	Bronze	Total
1	Soviet Union	14	6	2	22
2	Bulgaria	7	10	5	22
3	Hungary	3	0	6	9
4	Czechoslovakia	2	3	2	7
5	Cuba	2	0	2	4
6	East Germany	1	5	5	11
7	North Korea	1	2	2	5
8	Poland	0	3	6	9
9	France	0	1	0	1
Totals (9 entries)		30	30	30	90

== See also ==
- Weightlifting at the 1980 Summer Olympics
