= 1981 World Weightlifting Championships =

International weightlifting competition

- Host city: Lille, France, SFR Yugoslavia
- Dates: 18–26 September 1982

The 1981 Men's World Weightlifting Championships were held in Lille, France, from September 13 to September 20, 1981. There were 194 men in action from 35 nations.

== Medal summary ==
Event	Gold		Silver		Bronze	
52 kg
Snatch	Kanybek Osmonaliyev; Soviet Union	110.0 kg	Jacek Gutowski; Poland	110.0 kg	Kazushito Manabe; Japan	107.5 kg
Clean & Jerk	Kanybek Osmonaliyev; Soviet Union	137.5 kg	Ho Bong-chol; North Korea	132.5 kg	Kazushito Manabe; Japan	132.5 kg
Total	Kanybek Osmonaliyev; Soviet Union	247.5 kg	Jacek Gutowski; Poland	240.0 kg	Kazushito Manabe; Japan	240.0 kg
56 kg
Snatch	Andreas Letz; East Germany	120.0 kg	Anton Kodzhabashev; Bulgaria	117.5 kg	Nikolay Zakharov; Soviet Union	117.5 kg
Clean & Jerk	Anton Kodzhabashev; Bulgaria	155.0 kg	Andreas Letz; East Germany	152.5 kg	Nikolay Zakharov; Soviet Union	147.5 kg
Total	Anton Kodzhabashev; Bulgaria	272.5 kg	Andreas Letz; East Germany	272.5 kg	Nikolay Zakharov; Soviet Union	265.0 kg
60 kg
Snatch	Daniel Núñez; Cuba	135.0 kg WR	Beloslav Manolov; Bulgaria	132.5 kg	Yurik Sarkisyan; Soviet Union	130.0 kg
Clean & Jerk	Beloslav Manolov; Bulgaria	170.0 kg WR	Daniel Núñez; Cuba	167.5 kg	Yurik Sarkisyan; Soviet Union	165.0 kg
Total	Beloslav Manolov; Bulgaria	302.5 kg	Daniel Núñez; Cuba	302.5 kg WR	Yurik Sarkisyan; Soviet Union	295.0 kg
67.5 kg
Snatch	Daniel Senet; France	150.0 kg	Joachim Kunz; East Germany	150.0 kg	Mincho Pashov; Bulgaria	147.5 kg
Clean & Jerk	Joachim Kunz; East Germany	190.0 kg	Mincho Pashov; Bulgaria	182.5 kg	Karl-Heinz Radschinsky; West Germany	175.0 kg
Total	Joachim Kunz; East Germany	340.0 kg	Mincho Pashov; Bulgaria	330.0 kg	Daniel Senet; France	320.0 kg
75 kg
Snatch	Yanko Rusev; Bulgaria	157.5 kg	Aleksandr Pervy; Soviet Union	155.0 kg	Julio Echenique; Cuba	152.5 kg
Clean & Jerk	Yanko Rusev; Bulgaria	202.5 kg	Aleksandr Pervy; Soviet Union	202.5 kg	Hermann Kubenka; East Germany	190.0 kg
Total	Yanko Rusev; Bulgaria	360.0 kg WR	Aleksandr Pervy; Soviet Union	357.5 kg	Julio Echenique; Cuba	340.0 kg
82.5 kg
Snatch	Yurik Vardanyan; Soviet Union	170.0 kg	Asen Zlatev; Bulgaria	170.0 kg	Janusz Alchimowicz; Poland	160.0 kg
Clean & Jerk	Yurik Vardanyan; Soviet Union	222.5 kg	Dušan Poliačik; Czechoslovakia	210.0 kg	Asen Zlatev; Bulgaria	202.5 kg
Total	Yurik Vardanyan; Soviet Union	392.5 kg	Asen Zlatev; Bulgaria	372.5 kg	Dušan Poliačik; Czechoslovakia	367.5 kg
90 kg
Snatch	Blagoy Blagoev; Bulgaria	185.0 kg WR	Yury Zakharevich; Soviet Union	180.0 kg	Andrzej Piotrowski; Poland	167.5 kg
Clean & Jerk	Blagoy Blagoev; Bulgaria	220.0 kg	Yury Zakharevich; Soviet Union	217.5 kg	Lubomir Usherov; Bulgaria	212.5 kg
Total	Blagoy Blagoev; Bulgaria	405.0 kg	Yury Zakharevich; Soviet Union	397.5 kg	Lubomir Usherov; Bulgaria	380.0 kg
100 kg
Snatch	Viktor Sots; Soviet Union	182.5 kg	András Hlavati; Hungary	177.5 kg	Bruno Matykiewicz; Czechoslovakia	175.0 kg
Clean & Jerk	Viktor Sots; Soviet Union	225.0 kg	Veselin Osikovski; Bulgaria	217.5 kg	Bruno Matykiewicz; Czechoslovakia	217.5 kg
Total	Viktor Sots; Soviet Union	407.5 kg	Bruno Matykiewicz; Czechoslovakia	392.5 kg	Veselin Osikovski; Bulgaria	387.5 kg
110 kg
Snatch	Vyacheslav Klokov; Soviet Union	185.0 kg	Valery Kravchuk; Soviet Union	180.0 kg	Plamen Asparukhov; Bulgaria	180.0 kg
Clean & Jerk	Valery Kravchuk; Soviet Union	235.0 kg	Anton Baraniak; Czechoslovakia	227.5 kg	Plamen Asparukhov; Bulgaria	225.0 kg
Total	Valery Kravchuk; Soviet Union	415.0 kg	Vyacheslav Klokov; Soviet Union	410.0 kg	Plamen Asparukhov; Bulgaria	405.0 kg
+110 kg
Snatch	Anatoly Pisarenko; Soviet Union	187.5 kg	Rudolf Strejček; Czechoslovakia	187.5 kg	Antonio Krastev; Bulgaria	185.0 kg
Clean & Jerk	Anatoly Pisarenko; Soviet Union	237.5 kg	Senno Salzwedel; East Germany	237.5 kg	Tadeusz Rutkowski; Poland	232.5 kg
Total	Anatoly Pisarenko; Soviet Union	425.0 kg	Senno Salzwedel; East Germany	417.5 kg	Tadeusz Rutkowski; Poland	415.0 kg

== Medal table ==
Ranking by Big (Total result) medals

Rank	Nation	Gold	Silver	Bronze	Total
1	Soviet Union	5	3	2	10
2	Bulgaria	4	2	3	9
3	East Germany	1	2	0	3
4	Cuba	0	1	1	2
4	Czechoslovakia	0	1	1	2
4	Poland	0	1	1	2
7	France	0	0	1	1
7	Japan	0	0	1	1
Totals (8 entries)		10	10	10	30

Ranking by all medals: Big (Total result) and Small (Snatch and Clean & Jerk)

Rank	Nation	Gold	Silver	Bronze	Total
1	Soviet Union	15	8	6	29
2	Bulgaria	10	7	9	26
3	East Germany	3	5	1	9
4	Cuba	1	2	2	5
5	France	1	0	1	2
6	Czechoslovakia	0	4	3	7
7	Poland	0	2	4	6
8	Hungary	0	1	0	1
8	North Korea	0	1	0	1
10	Japan	0	0	3	3
11	West Germany	0	0	1	1
Totals (11 entries)		30	30	30	90
