= Weightlifting at the 1980 Summer Olympics – Men's 52 kg =

Weightlifting at the Olympics

Men's 52 kg at the Games of the XXII Olympiad
- Venue: Izmailovo Sports Palace
- Date: 20 July 1980
- Competitors: 18 from 15 nations

Medalists
1st place, gold medalist(s)		Kanybek Osmonaliyev	Soviet Union
2nd place, silver medalist(s)		Ho Bong-chol	North Korea
3rd place, bronze medalist(s)		Han Gyong-si	North Korea

The Men's Flyweight Weightlifting Event (– 52 kg) is the lightest men's event at the weightlifting competition, limiting competitors to a maximum of 52 kilograms of body mass. Each weightlifter had three attempts for both the snatch and clean and jerk lifting methods. The total of the best successful lift of each method was used to determine the final rankings and medal winners. Competition took place on 20 July in the Izmailovo Sports Palace.

The competition was very close with the top four lifters all having the same total. Kanybek Osmonaliyev won the gold medal as he was 0.2 kg lighter than Ho Bong-chol, while North Korean Han Gyong-si and Hungarian Béla Oláh both weighed 52.00 kg at the weigh-in before the event, but were re-weighed after the competition was over; Han Gyong-si weighed 0.1 kg less than Béla Oláh, and was thus awarded the bronze medal.

== Results ==
Rank	Name	Body weight	Snatch (kg)				Clean & Jerk (kg)				Total (kg)
Rank	Name	Body weight	1	2	3	Result	1	2	3	Result	Total (kg)
1st place, gold medalist(s)	Kanybek Osmonaliyev (URS)	51.70	102.5	107.5	~~110~~	107.5	132.5	137.5	~~142.5~~	137.5	245
2nd place, silver medalist(s)	Ho Bong-chol (PRK)	51.90	105	110	~~113~~	110	135	~~140~~	~~140~~	135	245
3rd place, bronze medalist(s)	Han Gyong-si (PRK)	52.00	105	110	~~113~~	110	135	~~140~~	~~140~~	135	245
4	Béla Oláh (HUN)	52.00	102.5	107.5	110	110	130	~~135~~	135	135	245
5	Stefan Leletko (POL)	51.70	100	105	~~107.5~~	105	130	135	~~140~~	135	240
6	Ferenc Hornyák (HUN)	52.00	102.5	107.5	~~110~~	107.5	~~130~~	130	~~135~~	130	237.5
7	Francisco Casamayor (CUB)	51.45	97.5	102.5	~~105~~	102.5	~~127.5~~	~~127.5~~	130	130	232.5
8	Adyaagiin Jügdernamjil (MGL)	51.65	90	95	97.5	97.5	117.5	~~122.5~~	~~122.5~~	117.5	215
9	Gaetano Tosto (ITA)	51.95	90	95	~~97.5~~	95	112.5	117.5	120	120	215
10	Ioannis Katsaidonis (GRE)	51.70	90	~~95~~	95	95	112.5	~~117.5~~	~~117.5~~	112.5	207.5
11	Humberto Fuentes (VEN)	52.00	~~90~~	~~90~~	90	90	117.5	~~127.5~~	~~127.5~~	117.5	207.5
12	Giuseppe Chiapparo (BEL)	51.65	~~85~~	85	90	90	110	~~115~~	~~115~~	110	200
13	Raúl Diniz (POR)	51.60	82.5	~~87.5~~	~~87.5~~	82.5	115	~~120~~	~~122.5~~	115	197.5
14	Imade Kadro (SYR)	51.45	77.5	85	~~87.5~~	85	105	~~110~~	~~110~~	105	190
15	Almabruk Mahmud Mahmud (LBA)	51.95	~~85~~	85	~~87.5~~	85	~~105~~	~~105~~	105	105	190
16	Durval de Moraes (BRA)	51.25	80	~~85~~	~~85~~	80	107.5	~~112.5~~	~~112.5~~	107.5	187.5
-	Karunagaran Ekambaram (IND)	51.90	90	~~95~~	-	90	-	-	-	-	DNF
-	Dorjiin Enkhbaatar (MGL)	51.65	90	~~95~~	~~95~~	90	~~120~~	~~120~~	~~120~~	0	DNF

== New records ==
Snatch	113.0 kg	Han Gyong-si (PRK)	WR
Total	245.0 kg	Kanybek Osmonaliyev (URS)	OR
