= Weightlifting at the 1980 Summer Olympics – Men's 110 kg =

Weightlifting at the Olympics

Men's 110 kg at the Games of the XXII Olympiad
- Venue: Izmailovo Sports Palace
- Date: 29 July 1980
- Competitors: 13 from 13 nations

Medalists
1st place, gold medalist(s)		Leonid Taranenko	Soviet Union
2nd place, silver medalist(s)		Valentin Khristov	Bulgaria
3rd place, bronze medalist(s)		György Szalai	Hungary

These are the results of the Men's Heavyweight II Weightlifting Event (– 110 kg) at the 1980 Olympic Weightlifting competition in Moscow. A total of 13 men competed in this event, limited to competitors with a maximum body weight of 110 kilograms.

Each weightlifter had three attempts for both the snatch and clean and jerk lifting methods. The total of the best successful lift of each method was used to determine the final rankings and medal winners. Competition took place on 29 July in the Izmailovo Sports Palace.

== Results ==
Rank	Name	Body weight	Snatch (kg)				Clean & Jerk (kg)				Total (kg)
Rank	Name	Body weight	1	2	3	Result	1	2	3	Result	Total (kg)
1st place, gold medalist(s)	Leonid Taranenko (URS)	109.90	~~182.5~~	182.5	~~190~~	182.5	220	235	240	240	422.5
2nd place, silver medalist(s)	Valentin Khristov (BUL)	109.55	177.5	182.5	185	185	220	~~235~~	~~235~~	220	405
3rd place, bronze medalist(s)	György Szalai (HUN)	108.10	~~167.5~~	167.5	172.5	172.5	212.5	217.5	~~225~~	217.5	390
4	Leif Nilsson (SWE)	108.70	~~167.5~~	167.5	~~172.5~~	167.5	~~212.5~~	212.5	~~225~~	212.5	380
5	Vinzenz Hörtnagl (AUT)	108.50	165	170	~~172.5~~	170	202.5	~~210~~	~~210~~	202.5	372.5
6	Ştefan Taşnadi (ROU)	108.45	165	~~170~~	~~170~~	165	195	~~207.5~~	~~207.5~~	195	360
7	Donald Mitchell (AUS)	109.10	157.5	162.5	~~167.5~~	162.5	185	~~190~~	190	190	352.5
8	Dimitrios Zarzavatsidis (GRE)	109.20	150	155	~~160~~	155	192.5	~~200~~	~~200~~	192.5	347.5
9	Viktor Sirkiä (FIN)	109.50	150	~~155~~	~~155~~	150	~~192.5~~	~~192.5~~	192.5	192.5	342.5
10	Andy Drzewiecki (GBR)	107.05	~~140~~	140	~~145~~	140	175	180	~~185~~	180	320
11	Ali Abdul Kader Maneer (IRQ)	101.90	135	~~145~~	~~145~~	135	160	165	-	165	300
12	Mario Rodríguez (DOM)	106.05	117.5	125	~~135~~	125	155	162.5	~~170~~	162.5	287.5
-	Pavel Khek (TCH)	108.90	~~175~~	~~175~~	~~177.5~~	-	-	-	-	-	DNF

== New records ==
Snatch	185.0 kg	Valentin Khristov (BUL)	OR
Clean & Jerk	240.0 kg	Leonid Taranenko (URS)	WR
Total	422.5 kg	Leonid Taranenko (URS)	WR
