= Weightlifting at the 1980 Summer Olympics – Men's 67.5 kg =

Weightlifting at the Olympics

Men's 67.5 kg at the Games of the XXII Olympiad
- Venue: Izmailovo Sports Palace
- Date: 23 July 1980
- Competitors: 20 from 17 nations

Medalists
1st place, gold medalist(s)		Yanko Rusev	Bulgaria
2nd place, silver medalist(s)		Joachim Kunz	East Germany
3rd place, bronze medalist(s)		Mincho Pashov	Bulgaria

These are the results of the Men's Lightweight Weightlifting Event (– 67.5 kg) at the 1980 Olympic Weightlifting competition in Moscow. A total of 20 men competed in this event, limited to competitors with a maximum body weight of 67.5 kilograms.

Each weightlifter had three attempts for both the snatch and clean and jerk lifting methods. The total of the best successful lift of each method was used to determine the final rankings and medal winners. Competition took place on 23 July in the Izmailovo Sports Palace.

== Results ==
Rank	Name	Body weight	Snatch (kg)				Clean & Jerk (kg)				Total (kg)
Rank	Name	Body weight	1	2	3	Result	1	2	3	Result	Total (kg)
1st place, gold medalist(s)	Yanko Rusev (BUL)	66.90	142.5	147.5	~~150~~	147.5	185	190	195	195	342.5
2nd place, silver medalist(s)	Joachim Kunz (GDR)	67.30	145	~~150~~	~~150~~	145	185	190	~~195~~	190	335
3rd place, bronze medalist(s)	Mincho Pashov (BUL)	67.10	135	140	142.5	142.5	177.5	182.5	~~190~~	182.5	325
4	Daniel Senet (FRA)	67.30	140	145	147.5	147.5	170	175	~~180~~	175	322.5
5	Günter Ambraß (GDR)	66.85	~~135~~	135	140	140	175	180	~~185~~	180	320
6	Zbigniew Kaczmarek (POL)	67.15	135	140	~~142.5~~	140	~~177.5~~	177.5	~~182.5~~	177.5	317.5
7	Raúl González (CUB)	67.25	140	145	~~147.5~~	145	172.5	~~177.5~~	~~177.5~~	172.5	317.5
8	Virgil Dociu (ROU)	67.10	135	140	~~142.5~~	140	~~170~~	170	~~175~~	170	310
9	Dušan Drška (TCH)	67.00	~~130~~	130	-	130	160	~~175~~	~~175~~	160	290
10	Juhani Salakka (FIN)	66.65	125	~~130~~	130	130	152.5	~~157.5~~	~~157.5~~	152.5	282.5
11	Basilios Stellios (AUS)	67.35	~~122.5~~	122.5	~~127.5~~	122.5	155	160	~~165~~	160	282.5
12	Nicolas Lasorsa (FRA)	67.00	125	~~130~~	~~130~~	125	~~155~~	155	~~160~~	155	280
13	Li Gwang-ju (PRK)	67.35	125	~~130~~	~~130~~	125	~~155~~	155	~~157.5~~	155	280
14	Leo Isaac (GBR)	67.50	117.5	~~122.5~~	~~122.5~~	117.5	157.5	~~165~~	~~165~~	157.5	275
15	Pavlos Lespouridis (GRE)	66.80	120	~~125~~	~~125~~	120	~~145~~	145	150	150	270
16	Walter Legel (AUT)	66.95	120	~~125~~	~~125~~	120	150	~~155~~	~~155~~	150	270
17	Mohammed Yaseen Mohammed (IRQ)	67.40	120	~~125~~	~~125~~	120	145	~~155~~	~~155~~	145	270
18	Alan Winterbourne (GBR)	67.35	~~117.5~~	~~117.5~~	117.5	117.5	150	~~160~~	~~160~~	150	267.5
19	Andrés Santoyo (MEX)	59.60	~~115~~	115	~~120~~	115	145	~~155~~	~~155~~	145	260
20	Sergio De Luca (SMR)	56.00	105	110	~~112.5~~	110	137.5	142.5	145	145	255

== New records ==
Snatch	147.5 kg	Yanko Rusev (BUL)	OR
Snatch	147.5 kg	Daniel Senet (FRA)	OR
Clean & Jerk	195 kg	Yanko Rusev (BUL)	WR
Total	342.5 kg	Yanko Rusev (BUL)	WR
