= Weightlifting at the 1980 Summer Olympics – Men's 90 kg =

Weightlifting at the Olympics

Men's 90 kg at the Games of the XXII Olympiad
- Venue: Izmailovo Sports Palace
- Date: 27 July 1980
- Competitors: 18 from 16 nations

Medalists
1st place, gold medalist(s)		Péter Baczakó	Hungary
2nd place, silver medalist(s)		Rumen Aleksandrov	Bulgaria
3rd place, bronze medalist(s)		Frank Mantek	East Germany

These are the results of the Men's Middle-Heavyweight Weightlifting Event (– 90 kg) at the 1980 Olympic Weightlifting competition in Moscow. A total of 18 men competed in this event, limited to competitors with a maximum body weight of 90 kilograms.

Each weightlifter had three attempts for both the snatch and clean and jerk lifting methods. The total of the best successful lift of each method was used to determine the final rankings and medal winners. Competition took place on 27 of July in the Izmailovo Sports Palace.

== Results ==
Rank	Name	Body weight	Snatch (kg)				Clean & Jerk (kg)				Total (kg)
Rank	Name	Body weight	1	2	3	Result	1	2	3	Result	Total (kg)
1st place, gold medalist(s)	Péter Baczakó (HUN)	89.10	162.5	167.5	170	170	202.5	207.5	~~210~~	207.5	377.5
2nd place, silver medalist(s)	Rumen Aleksandrov (BUL)	89.40	~~165~~	165	170	170	205	~~210~~	~~210~~	205	375
3rd place, bronze medalist(s)	Frank Mantek (GDR)	88.75	160	165	~~167.5~~	165	200	~~205~~	205	205	370
4	Dalibor Řehák (TCH)	89.50	165	~~170~~	~~170~~	165	195	~~200~~	200	200	365
5	Witold Walo (POL)	88.30	~~160~~	160	~~165~~	160	200	~~205~~	~~205~~	200	360
6	Lubomír Sršeň (TCH)	89.40	~~160~~	160	~~165~~	160	197.5	~~207.5~~	~~207.5~~	197.5	357.5
7	Vasile Groapă (ROU)	89.25	~~155~~	~~155~~	160	160	195	~~200~~	~~200~~	195	355
8	Nikos Iliadis (GRE)	88.20	~~150~~	150	~~155~~	150	180	190	195	195	345
9	Gary Langford (GBR)	89.05	150	~~157.5~~	~~157.5~~	150	~~180~~	180	~~192.5~~	180	330
10	Norberto Oberburger (ITA)	89.30	~~147.5~~	147.5	~~152.5~~	147.5	167.5	~~172.5~~	~~172.5~~	167.5	315
11	Luis Rosito (GUA)	88.15	~~132.5~~	132.5	~~137.5~~	132.5	~~170~~	175	~~182.5~~	175	307.5
12	Víctor Ruiz (MEX)	85.00	135	~~140~~	~~140~~	135	~~165~~	165	~~172.5~~	165	300
13	Guðmundur Helgason (ISL)	86.25	~~135~~	135	~~140~~	135	160	~~165~~	~~165~~	160	295
-	Ferenc Antalovics (HUN)	89.35	157.5	162.5	165	165	~~197.5~~	~~197.5~~	~~197.5~~	-	DNF
-	Luigi Fratangelo (AUS)	89.30	137.5	~~142.5~~	142.5	142.5	~~172.5~~	~~172.5~~	~~172.5~~	-	DNF
-	David Rigert (URS)	89.10	~~170~~	~~170~~	~~170~~	-	-	-	-	-	DNF
-	Hugo De Grauwe (BEL)	89.60	~~140~~	~~140~~	~~140~~	-	-	-	-	-	DNF
-	Sann Myint (BIR)	89.70	~~125~~	~~125~~	~~125~~	-	-	-	-	-	DNF
