= Weightlifting at the 1980 Summer Olympics – Men's 82.5 kg =

Weightlifting at the Olympics

Men's 82.5 kg at the Games of the XXII Olympiad
- Venue: Izmailovo Sports Palace
- Date: 26 July 1980
- Competitors: 19 from 17 nations

Medalists
1st place, gold medalist(s)		Yurik Vardanyan	Soviet Union
2nd place, silver medalist(s)		Blagoy Blagoev	Bulgaria
3rd place, bronze medalist(s)		Dušan Poliačik	Czechoslovakia

These are the results of the Men's Light-Heavyweight Weightlifting Event (– 82.5 kg) at the 1980 Olympic Weightlifting competition in Moscow. A total of 19 men competed in this event, limited to competitors with a maximum body weight of 82.5 kilograms.

Each weightlifter had three attempts for both the snatch and clean and jerk lifting methods. The total of the best successful lift of each method was used to determine the final rankings and medal winners. Competition took place on 26 July in the Izmailovo Sports Palace.

== Results ==
Rank	Name	Body weight	Snatch (kg)				Clean & Jerk (kg)				Total (kg)
Rank	Name	Body weight	1	2	3	Result	1	2	3	Result	Total (kg)
1st place, gold medalist(s)	Yurik Vardanyan (URS)	81.70	165	172.5	177.5	177.5	205	215.5	222.5	222.5	400
2nd place, silver medalist(s)	Blagoy Blagoev (BUL)	81.60	165	170	175	175	192.5	197.5	-	197.5	372.5
3rd place, bronze medalist(s)	Dušan Poliačik (TCH)	82.00	155	~~160~~	160	160	200	205	207.5	207.5	367.5
4	Jan Lisowski (POL)	81.85	150	~~155~~	~~155~~	150	197.5	205	~~210~~	205	355
5	Krasimir Drandarov (BUL)	81.95	150	~~155~~	155	155	200	~~205~~	~~212.5~~	200	355
6	Paweł Rabczewski (POL)	82.30	155	~~160~~	~~160~~	155	~~195~~	195	~~202.5~~	195	350
7	Detlef Blasche (GDR)	80.95	~~152.5~~	152.5	~~157.5~~	152.5	192.5	~~197.5~~	~~197.5~~	192.5	345
8	Juhani Avellan (FIN)	82.35	150	~~155~~	-	150	~~182.5~~	182.5	~~190~~	182.5	332.5
9	Vladimir Zrnić (YUG)	82.30	137.5	~~142.5~~	142.5	142.5	180	~~187.5~~	187.5	187.5	330
10	Stefan Jonsson (SWE)	82.35	137.5	~~142.5~~	142.5	142.5	180	185	~~187.5~~	185	327.5
11	Talal Hassoun Abdul Kader (IRQ)	81.55	137.5	142.5	145	145	177.5	~~182.5~~	~~182.5~~	177.5	322.5
12	Erling Johansen (DEN)	81.40	142.5	147.5	~~150~~	147.5	170	~~175~~	~~175~~	170	317.5
13	Stephen Pinsent (GBR)	79.50	~~135~~	135	~~140~~	135	170	~~175~~	~~175~~	170	305
14	Salem Ajjoub (SYR)	82.50	127.5	~~132.5~~	~~132.5~~	127.5	170	175	~~177.5~~	175	302.5
-	Petre Dumitru (ROM)	81.90	155	~~160~~	~~160~~	155	~~190~~	~~190~~	~~190~~	-	DNF
-	Robert Kabbas (AUS)	81.60	142.5	~~147.5~~	~~147.5~~	142.5	~~182.5~~	~~182.5~~	~~182.5~~	-	DNF
-	Þorsteinn Leifsson (ISL)	82.40	125	~~130~~	~~130~~	125	~~160~~	~~160~~	~~160~~	-	DNF
-	Bertalan Mandzák (HUN)	81.80	~~155~~	~~155~~	~~155~~	-	-	-	-	-	DNF
-	Serge Van Cottom (BEL)	81.55	~~132.5~~	~~132.5~~	~~132.5~~	-	-	-	-	-	DNF

== New records ==
Snatch	177.5 kg	Yurik Vardanyan (URS)	WR
Clean & Jerk	222.5 kg	Yurik Vardanyan (URS)	WR
Total	400.0 kg	Yurik Vardanyan (URS)	WR
