= Raúl González (disambiguation) =

Raúl González (born 1977), known as Raúl, is a retired Spanish footballer.

Raúl González may also refer to:

- Otto-Raúl González (1921–2007), Guatemalan writer, lawyer and communist
- Raul A. Gonzalez (born 1940), U.S. lawyer, justice of the Supreme Court of Texas
- Raul M. Gonzalez (1931–2014), Secretary of Justice of the Philippines from 2004 to 2009
- Raúl González de la Vega (born 1961/62), Mexican lawyer and politician
- Raúl González Tuñón (1905–1974), Argentine poet and writer
- Raúl Homero González Villalva (born 1950), Mexican politician
- Raúl González (baseball) (born 1973), Puerto Rican Major League Baseball player
- Raúl González (boxer) (born 1967), Cuban Olympic medalist in boxing
- Raúl González (footballer, born 1955), Chilean football defender
- Raúl González (footballer, born 1976), Argentine football striker
- Raúl González (footballer, born 1985), Venezuelan football right-back
- Raúl González (footballer, born 1991), Spanish football forward
- Raúl González (footballer, born 1994), Puerto Rican football midfielder
- Raúl González (football manager, born 1952), Uruguayan football manager
- Raúl González (football manager, born 1968), Chilean football manager
- Raúl González (handballer) (born 1970), Spanish handball player
- Raúl González (host) (born 1971), Venezuelan host on the Univisión television network
- Raul Gonzalez (journalist) (1935–2013), Filipino journalist and columnist
- Raúl González (race walker) (born 1952), Mexican Olympic medalist in race walking
- Raúl González (weightlifter) (born 1957), Cuban Olympic weightlifter
