= Weightlifting at the 1980 Summer Olympics – Men's +110 kg =

Weightlifter at the Olympics

Men's +110 kg at the Games of the XXII Olympiad
- Venue: Izmailovo Sports Palace
- Date: 30 July 1980
- Competitors: 12 from 8 nations

Medalists
1st place, gold medalist(s)		Sultan Rakhmanov	Soviet Union
2nd place, silver medalist(s)		Jürgen Heuser	East Germany
3rd place, bronze medalist(s)		Tadeusz Rutkowski	Poland

These are the results of the Men's Super-Heavyweight Weightlifting Event (– +110 kg) at the 1980 Olympic Weightlifting competition in Moscow. A total of twelve men competed in this event, limited to competitors with a body weight of 110 kilograms or more.

Each weightlifter had three attempts for both the snatch and clean and jerk lifting methods. The total of the best successful lift of each method was used to determine the final rankings and medal winners. Competition took place on 30 July in the Izmailovo Sports Palace.

== Results ==
Rank	Name	Body weight	Snatch (kg)				Clean & Jerk (kg)				Total (kg)
Rank	Name	Body weight	1	2	3	Result	1	2	3	Result	Total (kg)
1st place, gold medalist(s)	Sultan Rakhmanov (URS)	145.25	185	190	195	195	230	237.5	245	245	440
2nd place, silver medalist(s)	Jürgen Heuser (GDR)	133.95	~~182.5~~	182.5	~~187.5~~	182.5	~~227.5~~	227.5	~~242.5~~	227.5	410
3rd place, bronze medalist(s)	Tadeusz Rutkowski (POL)	124.90	175	180	~~182.5~~	180	222.5	227.5	~~230~~	227.5	407.5
4	Rudolf Strejček (TCH)	133.10	182.5	~~187.5~~	~~187.5~~	182.5	220	~~225~~	~~225~~	220	402.5
5	Bohuslav Braum (TCH)	148.45	~~180~~	~~180~~	180	180	212.5	217.5	~~222.5~~	217.5	397.5
6	Francisco Méndez (CUB)	134.30	175	~~180~~	~~180~~	175	220	~~230~~	~~230~~	220	395
7	Robert Skolimowski (POL)	148.50	~~175~~	175	~~180~~	175	210	~~222.5~~	~~222.5~~	210	385
8	Talal Najjar (SYR)	133.30	145	152.5	157.5	157.5	200	205	~~207.5~~	205	362.5
-	Jouko Leppä (FIN)	149.70	150	155	160	160	~~210~~	~~210~~	~~210~~	-	DNF
-	Marin Parapancea (ROU)	115.30	~~162.5~~	~~162.5~~	~~162.5~~	-	-	-	-	-	DNF
-	Gerardo Fernández (CUB)	128.00	~~170~~	~~170~~	~~170~~	-	-	-	-	-	DNF
-	Vasily Alekseyev (URS)	161.75	~~180~~	~~180~~	~~180~~	-	-	-	-	-	DNF

== New records ==
Snatch	195.0 kg	Sultan Rakhmanov (URS)	OR
