= Cottom =

Cottom is a surname. Notable people with the surname include:

- Brandon Cottom (born 1992), American football fullback
- Norman Cottom (1912–1972), American basketball player
- Serge Van Cottom (born 1953), Belgian weightlifter
- Tressie McMillan Cottom (born 1976), American writer, sociologist and professor
