= Donald Mitchell =

Donald Mitchell may refer to:

- Donald Mitchell (writer) (1925–2017), British writer on music
- Donald Grant Mitchell (1822–1908), American essayist and novelist
- Donald J. Mitchell (1923–2003), congressman from New York
- Donald Mitchell (American football) (born 1976), Tennessee Titans football player
- Donald O. Mitchell, American sound engineer
- Donald Mitchell (weightlifter) (1955–2010), Australian Olympic weightlifter

== See also ==
- Don Mitchell (disambiguation)
