= Sirkiä =

Surname list

Sirkiä is a Finnish surname. Notable people with the surname include:

- Mauri Olavi Sirkiä (born 1947), Finnish chess master
- Raimo Sirkiä (born 1951), Finnish operatic tenor
- Viktor Sirkiä (born 1949), Finnish weightlifter
