= Hörtnagl =

Hörtnagl is a surname. Notable people with the surname include:

- Alfred Hörtnagl (born 1966), Austrian footballer
- Andreas Hörtnagl (born 1942), Austrian politician
- Vinzenz Hörtnagl (born 1948), Austrian weightlifter
