= Stefan Jonsson =

Stefan Jonsson may refer to:

- Stefán Jónsson (handballer) (born 1944), Icelandic handball player
- Stefán Jónsson (water polo) (born 1918), Icelandic water polo player
- Stefan Jonsson (weightlifter) (born 1956), Icelandic weightlifter
