= Arakelov =

Arakelov (Russian: Аракелов) is a Russian masculine surname of Armenian origin, its feminine counterpart is Arakelova. It may refer to

- Sergey Arakelov (born 1957), Russian weightlifter
- Suren Arakelov (born 1947), Soviet mathematician
