= Detlef Blasche =

German weightlifter

Personal information
- Nationality: German
- Born: 23 October 1955 (age 70) Frankfurt (Oder), Germany

Sport
- Sport: Weightlifting

Detlef Blasche (born 23 October 1955) is a German weightlifter. He competed in the men's light heavyweight event at the 1980 Summer Olympics.
