= Imade Kadro =

Syrian weightlifter

Personal information
- Nationality: Syrian
- Born: 17 August 1958 (age 66)

Sport
- Sport: Weightlifting

Imade Kadro (born 17 August 1958) is a Syrian weightlifter. He competed in the men's flyweight event at the 1980 Summer Olympics.
