= Giuseppe Chiapparo =

Belgian weightlifter

Personal information
- Nationality: Belgian
- Born: 29 December 1957 (age 67); Ougrée, Belgium

Sport
- Sport: Weightlifting

Giuseppe Chiapparo (born 29 December 1957) is a Belgian weightlifter. He competed in the men's flyweight event at the 1980 Summer Olympics.
