= Durval de Moraes =

Brazilian weightlifter

Personal information
- Nationality: Brazilian
- Born: 20 March 1960 (age 65)

Sport
- Sport: Weightlifting

Durval de Moraes (born 20 March 1960) is a Brazilian weightlifter. He competed in the men's flyweight event at the 1980 Summer Olympics.
