= Nicolas Lasorsa =

French weightlifter

Personal information
- Nationality: French
- Born: 17 February 1954 (age 71)

Sport
- Sport: Weightlifting

Nicolas Lasorsa (born 17 February 1954) is a French people weightlifter. He competed in the men's lightweight event at the 1980 Summer Olympics.
