= Juhani Salakka =

Finnish weightlifter

Personal information
- Nationality: Finnish
- Born: 13 September 1950; Lahti, Finland
- Died: 17 February 2015 (aged 64); Lahti, Finland

Sport
- Sport: Weightlifting

Juhani Salakka (13 September 1950 – 17 February 2015) was a Finnish weightlifter. He competed in the men's lightweight event at the 1980 Summer Olympics.
