= Ali Abdul Kader Maneer =

Iraqi weightlifter

Personal information
- Nationality: Iraqi
- Born: 1955 (age 69–70)

Sport
- Sport: Weightlifting

Ali Abdul Kader Maneer (born 1955) is an Iraqi weightlifter. He competed in the men's heavyweight II event at the 1980 Summer Olympics.
