= Marin Parapancea =

Romanian weightlifter

Personal information
- Nationality: Romanian
- Born: 24 October 1950; Bucharest, Romania
- Died: February 2022 (aged 71)

Sport
- Sport: Weightlifting

Marin Parapancea (24 October 1950 – February 2022) was a Romanian weightlifter. He competed in the men's super heavyweight event at the 1980 Summer Olympics.
