= Mario Rodríguez (weightlifter) =

Dominican Republic weightlifter

Personal information
- Nationality: Dominican

Sport
- Sport: Weightlifting

Mario Rodríguez is a Dominican Republic weightlifter. He competed in the men's heavyweight II event at the 1980 Summer Olympics.
