= Dimitrios Zarzavatsidis =

Greek weightlifter (1956–2025)

Dimitrios Zarzavatsidis Δημήτρης Ζαρζαβατσίδης

Personal information
- Nationality: Greek
- Born: 15 January 1956
- Died: 29 July 2025 (aged 69)

Sport
- Sport: Weightlifting

Dimitrios Zarzavatsidis (Greek: Δημήτρης Ζαρζαβατσίδης; 15 January 1956 – 29 July 2025) was a Greek weightlifter. He was born in Thessaloniki and competed in the men's heavyweight II event at the 1980 Summer Olympics. He was married to Voula Patoulidou.

Zarzavatsidis died of cancer on 29 July 2025, at the age of 69.
