= Þorsteinn Leifsson =

Icelandic weightlifter (born 1961)

Personal information
- Nationality: Icelandic
- Born: 6 September 1961 (age 63)

Sport
- Sport: Weightlifting

Þorsteinn Leifsson (born 6 September 1961) is an Icelandic weightlifter. He competed in the men's light heavyweight event at the 1980 Summer Olympics.
