= Sergio De Luca (weightlifter) =

Sammarinese weightlifter

Personal information
- Nationality: Sammarinese
- Born: 5 September 1955 (age 69)

Sport
- Sport: Weightlifting

Sergio De Luca (born 5 September 1955) is a Sammarinese weightlifter. He competed in the men's lightweight event at the 1980 Summer Olympics.
