= Don Mitchell =

Don Mitchell may refer to:

- Don Mitchell (actor) (1943–2013), American actor best known for his role in the TV series Ironside
- Don Mitchell (aircraft designer), designer of the Mitchell Nimbus, Mitchell U-2 Superwing and AmeriPlanes Mitchell Wing A-10
- Don Mitchell (geographer) (born 1961), professor of geography at the Maxwell School of Syracuse University
- Don Mitchell (politician) (born c. 1951), Canadian politician, mayor of Whitby

== See also ==
- Donald Mitchell (disambiguation)
