= Almabruk Mahmud Mahmud =

Libyan weightlifter

Personal information
- Nationality: Libyan

Sport
- Sport: Weightlifting

Almabruk Mahmud Mahmud is a Libyan weightlifter. He competed in the men's flyweight event at the 1980 Summer Olympics.
