= Luis Rosito =

Guatemalan weightlifter

Personal information
- Nationality: Guatemalan
- Born: 25 March 1951 (age 74)

Sport
- Sport: Weightlifting

Luis Rosito (born 25 March 1951) is a Guatemalan weightlifter. He competed in the men's middle heavyweight event at the 1980 Summer Olympics.
