= Dalibor Řehák =

Czech weightlifter

Personal information
- Nationality: Czech
- Born: 11 September 1955 (age 70) Příbor, Czechoslovakia

Sport
- Sport: Weightlifting

Dalibor Řehák (born 11 September 1955) is a Czech weightlifter. He competed in the men's middle heavyweight event at the 1980 Summer Olympics.
