= Donald Mitchell (weightlifter) =

Australian weightlifter (1955–2010)

Personal information
- Nationality: Australian
- Born: 23 February 1955
- Died: 18 November 2010 (aged 55)

Sport
- Sport: Weightlifting

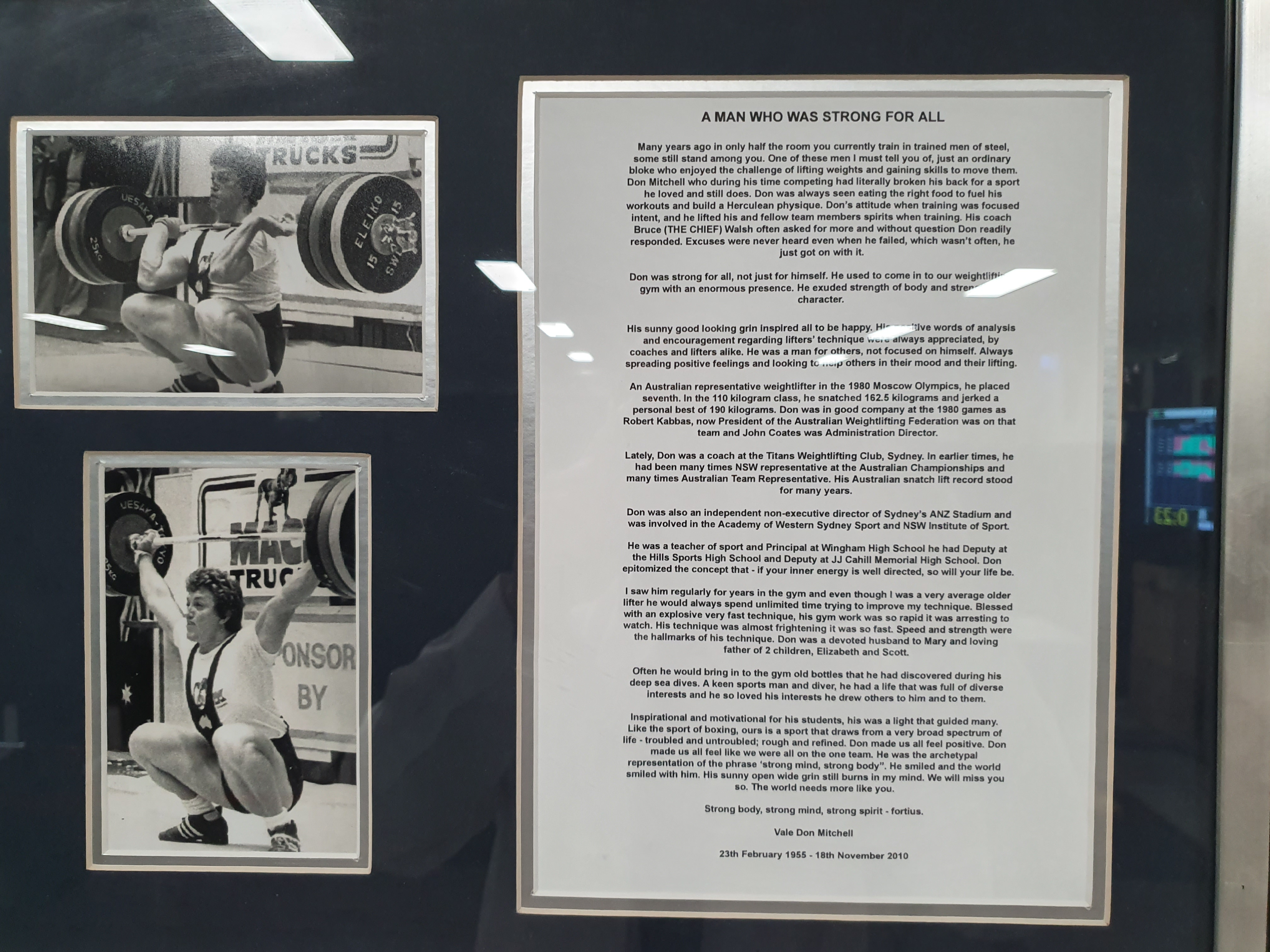

Donald Mitchell (23 February 1955 – 18 November 2010) was an Australian weightlifter. He competed in the men's heavyweight II event at the 1980 Summer Olympics.

Don was a teacher of sport and Principal at Wingham High School, he had been Deputy Principal at The Hills Sports High and Deputy at JJ Cahill Memorial High. He was a non-Executive Director at ANZ Stadium in Sydney and was involved with the Academy of Western Sydney Sport and NSW Institute of Sport.
