= Francisco Méndez (weightlifter) =

Cuban weightlifter

Personal information
- Nationality: Cuban
- Born: 21 January 1960 (age 66)

Sport
- Sport: Weightlifting

Francisco Méndez (born 21 January 1960) is a Cuban weightlifter. He competed in the men's super heavyweight event at the 1980 Summer Olympics.
