= Witold Walo =

Polish weightlifter

Personal information
- Nationality: Polish
- Born: 10 December 1954 (age 70); Warsaw, Poland

Sport
- Sport: Weightlifting

Witold Walo (born 10 December 1954) is a Polish weightlifter. He competed in the men's middle heavyweight event at the 1980 Summer Olympics.
