= Lubomír Sršeň =

Czech weightlifter

Personal information
- Nationality: Czech
- Born: 26 June 1954 (age 72) Ústí nad Orlicí, Czechoslovakia

Sport
- Sport: Weightlifting

Lubomír Sršeň (born 26 June 1954) is a Czech weightlifter. He competed in the men's middle heavyweight event at the 1980 Summer Olympics.
