= Mincho Pashov =

Bulgarian weightlifter (died 2019)

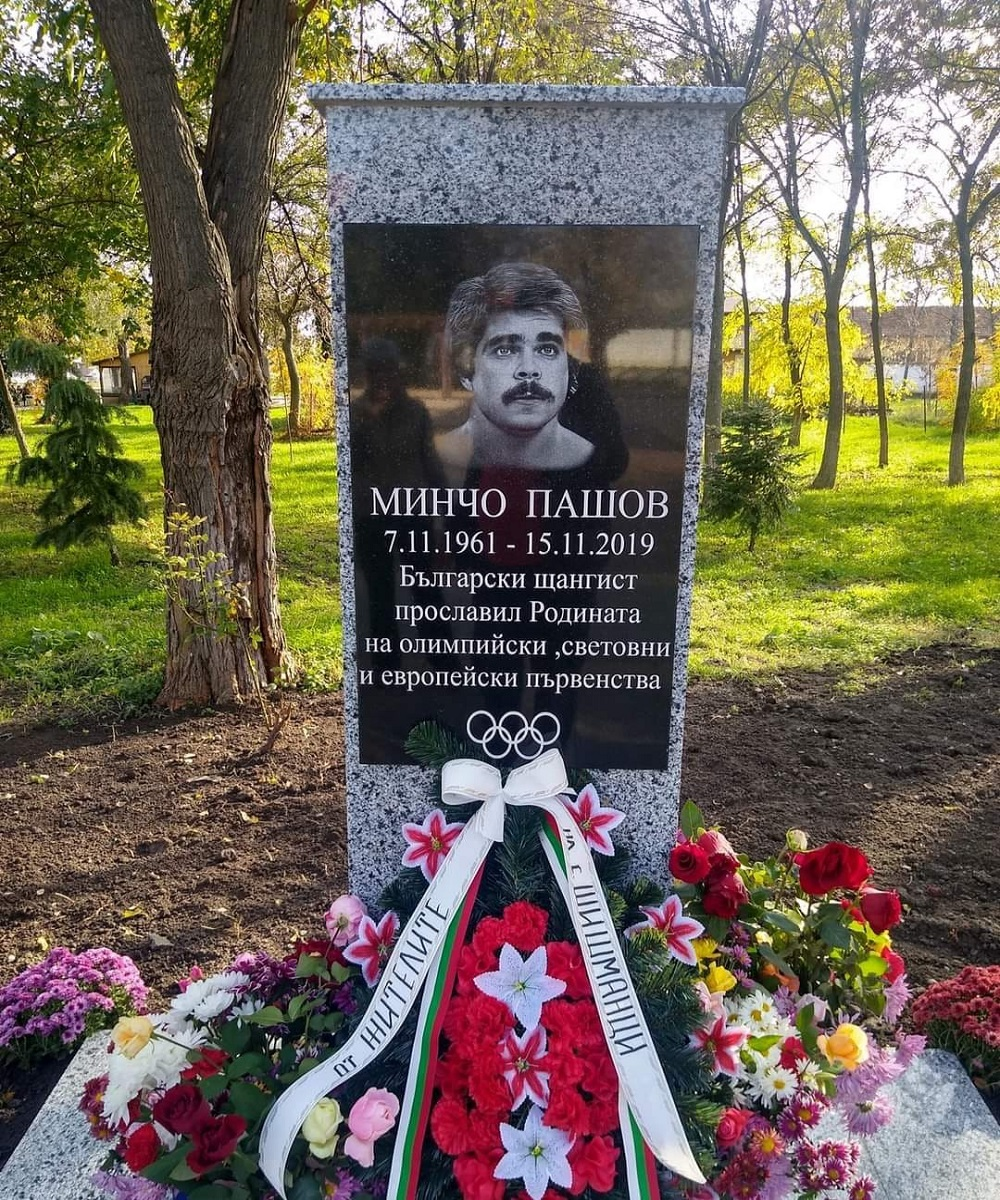
- Portrait on his memorial plaque

Personal information
- Born: November 7, 1961 Shishmantsi
- Died: 15 November 2019 (aged 58) Plovdiv
Medal record
Men's Weightlifting
Representing Bulgaria
Olympic Games
Bronze medal – third place	1980 Moscow	67.5 kg
World Championships
Silver medal – second place	1981 Lille	67.5 kg
Silver medal – second place	1982 Ljubljana	75 kg
Silver medal – second place	1985 Södertälje	75 kg
Bronze medal – third place	1980 Moscow	67.5 kg
European Championships
Silver medal – second place	1981 Lille	67.5 kg
Silver medal – second place	1982 Ljubljana	75 kg
IWF World Cup
Gold medal – first place	1982 Tatabanya	75 kg
Gold medal – first place	1983 Meissen	75 kg
Silver medal – second place	1983 Cardiff	75 kg
Junior World Championships
Gold medal – first place	1980 Montreal	67.5 kg
Gold medal – first place	1981 Lignano Sabbiadoro	67,5 kg
Junior European Championships
Gold medal – first place	1981 Lignano Sabbiadoro	67.5 kg
Balkan Championships
Gold medal – first place	1984 Kikinda	82.5 kg
Danube Cup
Gold medal – first place	1980 Trenčín	67.5 kg
Gold medal – first place	1981 Ebensee	67.5 kg
Gold medal – first place	1984 Vidin	75 kg
Friendship Cup
Silver medal – second place	1982 Frunze	75 kg
Kakousis-Tofalos Cup
Silver medal – second place	1986 Athens	82.5 kg
Bulgarian Championships
Gold medal – first place	1985 Sliven	75 kg
Silver medal – second place	1982 Varna	75 kg
Bulgarian Junior&Youth Championships
Gold medal – first place	1977 Targovishte	56 kg
Gold medal – first place	1978 Haskovo	60 kg
Gold medal – first place	1979 Plovdiv	60 kg
Gold medal – first place	1980 Plovdiv	75 kg
Gold medal – first place	1981 Vidin	67,5 kg

Mincho Pashov (Bulgarian: Минчо Пашов) (7 November 1961 – 15 November 2019) was a Bulgarian weightlifter. He won the bronze medal in the 67.5 kg in the 1980 Summer Olympics in Moscow. In 1980 and 1981 he was a world junior champion. He is three-time World Senior vice-champion - 1981, 1982, 1985, and two-time European Senior vice-champion - 1981, 1982, in 67,5 and 75 kg category. At the World Championship in 1982 in Ljubljana, Slovenia, he and Yanko Rusev improved six world records in six minutes in the category up to 75 kg. Pashov started training weightlifting in 1972 under Gancho Karushkov. He studied at the Vasil Levski Sports School and continued his education at the National Sports Academy. Mincho Pashov competed for the teams of Maritsa Plovdiv (1972 – 1981), CSKA (1981 – 1982) and Levski-Spartak (1982 – 1986). Pashov has won a total of 25 medals - 7 gold, 12 silver and 6 bronze, in total, snatch and clean and jerk from Olympic Games, World and European Championships. Despite being a very strong contender, Pashov never won a top gold medal on the international arena. He had a superb opponents’ list including his teammates Yanko Rusev and Joachim Kunz when he pursued the win in the lightweight. And then in the middleweight he was facing, first, Yanko Rusev and then another fascinating athlete Alexander Varbanov. Pashov set three world records in his career – all three in the clean-and-jerk in the 75 kg class.
