= Stefan Jonsson (weightlifter) =

Swedish weightlifter

Personal information
- Nationality: Swedish
- Born: 2 June 1956 (age 68); Malmö, Sweden

Sport
- Sport: Weightlifting

Stefan Jonsson (born 2 June 1956) is a Swedish weightlifter and bodybuilder. He competed in the men's light heavyweight event at the 1980 Summer Olympics.
