= Serge Van Cottom =

Belgian weightlifter

Personal information
- Nationality: Belgian
- Born: 5 February 1953 (age 72); Uccle, Belgium

Sport
- Sport: Weightlifting

Serge Van Cottom (born 5 February 1953) is a Belgian weightlifter. He competed in the men's light heavyweight event at the 1980 Summer Olympics.
