= Valery Kravchuk =

Soviet weightlifter (born 1955)

Personal information
- Born: 1955 (age 70–71) Zhovti Vody, Ukraine

Sport
- Sport: Weightlifting
Medal record
Representing Soviet Union
World Championships
| Gold medal – first place | 1981 Lille | -110 kg |

Valery Anatolievich Kravchuk (Russian: Валерий Анатольевич Кравчук, born 1955) is a retired Soviet heavyweight weightlifter. In 1981 he won the Soviet, European and world titles. His brother Sergey is also a retired competitive weightlifter.
