= Raúl González (weightlifter) =

Cuban weightlifter

Personal information
- Nationality: Cuban
- Born: 20 February 1957 (age 68)

Sport
- Sport: Weightlifting

Raúl González (born 20 February 1957) is a Cuban weightlifter. He competed in the men's lightweight event at the 1980 Summer Olympics.
