= Adyaagiin Jügdernamjil =

Mongolian weightlifter (born 1952)

Personal information
- Nationality: Mongolia
- Born: 20 August 1952 (age 72)
- Height: 1.54 m (5 ft 1 in)
- Weight: 52 kg (115 lb)

Sport
- Sport: Weightlifting

Adyaagiin Jügdernamjil (born 20 August 1952) is a Mongolian weightlifter. He competed in the 1980 Summer Olympics.
