= Guðmundur Helgason =

Icelandic weightlifter (born 1961)

Personal information
- Nationality: Icelandic
- Born: 29 June 1961 (age 63)

Sport
- Sport: Weightlifting

Guðmundur Helgason (born 29 June 1961) is an Icelandic weightlifter. He competed in the men's middle heavyweight event at the 1980 Summer Olympics.
