= Viktor Sirkiä =

Finnish weightlifter

Personal information
- Nationality: Finnish
- Born: 20 March 1949 (age 76) Omsk, Soviet Union

Sport
- Sport: Weightlifting

Viktor Sirkiä (born 20 March 1949) is a Finnish weightlifter. He competed in the men's heavyweight II event at the 1980 Summer Olympics.
