= Gregor Bialowas =

Austrian weightlifter (born 1959)

Personal information
- Nationality: Austrian
- Born: 26 August 1959 (age 65)

Sport
- Sport: Weightlifting

Gregor Bialowas (born 26 August 1959) is an Austrian weightlifter. He competed in the men's lightweight event at the 1984 Summer Olympics.
