= Luigi Fratangelo =

Australian weightlifter (born 1958)

Personal information
- Nationality: Australian
- Born: 19 July 1958 (age 67)

Sport
- Sport: Weightlifting

Luigi Carmine Fratangelo (born 19 July 1958) is an Australian weightlifter. He competed in the men's middle heavyweight event at the 1980 Summer Olympics.
