= Hugo De Grauwe =

Belgian weightlifter

Personal information
- Nationality: Belgian
- Born: 13 April 1954 (age 70); Merchtem, Belgium

Sport
- Sport: Weightlifting

Hugo De Grauwe (born 13 April 1954) is a Belgian weightlifter. He competed in the men's middle heavyweight event at the 1980 Summer Olympics.
