= Raúl González de la Vega =

Mexican politician

Member of the Congress of Sonora Plurinominal
- Incumbent
- Assumed office 1 September 2024

Personal details
- Born: 1961 or 1962 (age 63–64) Navojoa, Sonora, Mexico
- Citizenship: Mexican
- Party: Partido Sonorense
- Other political affiliations: PRI (former); PAN (former)
- Education: Universidad de Sonora (LLB)

Raúl González de la Vega (born 1961/62) (Note: González de la Vega was 62 years old in 2024) is a Mexican lawyer and politician who is currently serving in the Congress of Sonora as a member of the Partido Sonorense.

== Early life and legal career ==
González de la Vega is a native of Navojoa, Sonora. As a youth, he assisted Manlio Fabio Beltrones' campaign for the Chamber of Deputies by distributing posters and flyers. González de la Vega earned a law degree from the Universidad de Sonora, Navojoa campus in 1992. He went on to serve various roles within the Barra Sonorense de Abogados (Sonoran Bar Association), including treasurer and deputy treasurer.

== Political career ==
González de la Vega was initially a member of the Institutional Revolutionary Party (PRI) and worked as a civil servant in the Secretariat of Education and Culture. During the 1997 state elections, he served as the personal secretary for Armando López Nogales during his campaign for Governor of Sonora. After López Nogales won the race, González de la Vega was appointed the general director of DIF Sonora. Notably, he collaborated with U.S. authorities to dismantle a human trafficking network in the border town of Agua Prieta. González de la Vega served in the post from 1997 to 2001, ultimately stepping down for health reasons. In 2003, he unsuccessfully sought the PRI's nomination to represent Sonora's 7th district in the Chamber of Deputies.

González de la Vega officially switched his affiliation to the National Action Party (PAN). He earned the PAN's nomination for the municipal president of Quiriego in the 2009 state elections, but lost in the general election. In September 2014, González de la Vega was named director of the state's civil registry under Governor Guillermo Padrés Elías. He led the office's efforts to simplify the process for Sonorans to obtain their birth certificates, including for senior citizens and those who have since moved out of the state (or country). In December 2015, González de la Vega was named Sonora's delegate for the Fundación Internacional de Niños Desaparecidos (FIND; International Foundation for Missing Children), heading the state's office in Hermosillo.

=== Partido Sonorense ===
In early 2023, González de la Vega was announced as the inaugural vice-president of the newly-created Partido Sonorense (PS), a state-wide regional party which obtained official registration that July. In the 2024 state elections, the PS won seven municipal presidencies and was awarded one seat in the Congress of Sonora via proportional representation, which went to González de la Vega. The nascent party also retained its registration with the State Electoral Institute of Sonora by obtaining at least three percent of the vote. González de la Vega assumed his seat in the LXIV Legislature of the Congress of Sonora on 1 September.

Within a month of assuming office, González de la Vega proposed a bill to criminalize the recruitment of minors for criminal activity and impose a penalty of 12 to 30 years imprisonment for the offense. He noted that criminal organizations were increasingly turning to youth recruitment to carry out their illicit activities.
