= Sultan Rakhmanov =

Soviet weightlifter (1950–2003)

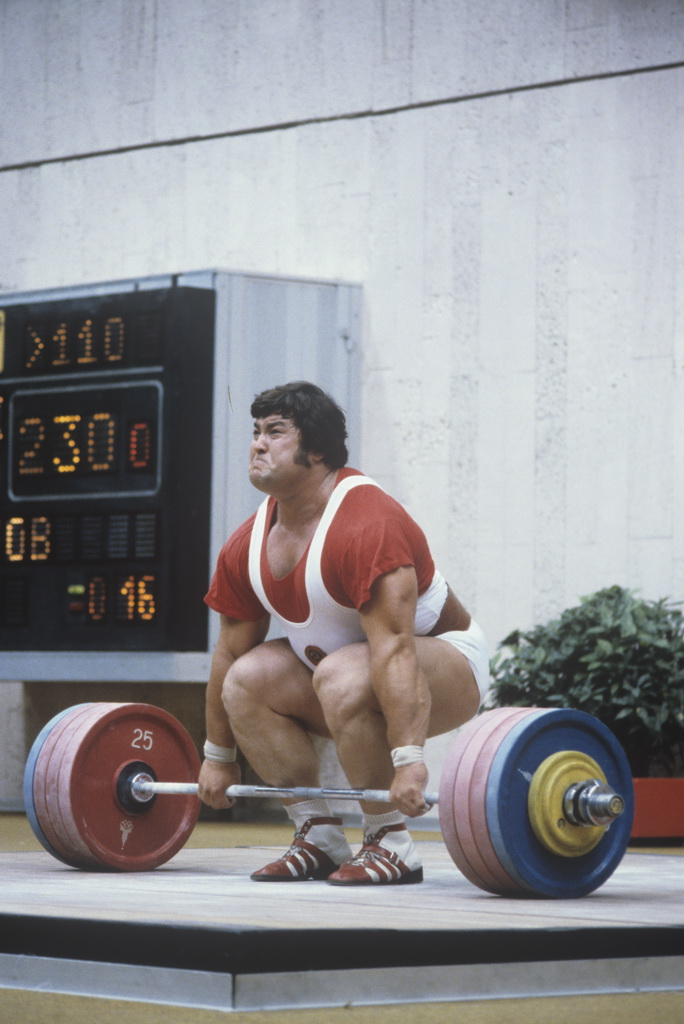
- Sultan Rakhmanov

Personal information
- Full name: Sultan Saburovych Rakhmanov
- Nationality: Uzbek
- Born: 6 July 1950 Toʻrtkoʻl, Karakalpak ASSR, Uzbek SSR, Soviet Union
- Died: 5 May 2003 (aged 52) Dnipropetrovsk, Ukraine
- Height: 1.88 m (6 ft 2 in)
- Weight: 145 kg (320 lb)

Sport
- Country: Soviet Union
- Sport: Olympic weightlifting
- Event: + 110 kg
Medal record
Men's weightlifting
Representing Soviet Union
Olympic Games
Gold medal – first place	1980 Moscow	+110 kg
World Weightlifting Championships
Silver medal – second place	1978 Gettysburg	+110kg
Gold medal – first place	1979 Thessaloniki	+110kg
Gold medal – first place	1980 Moscow	+110kg
European Weightlifting Championships
Gold medal – first place	1980 Beograd	+110kg
USSR Weightlifting Championships
Bronze medal – third place	1976 Karagenda	+110kg
Gold medal – first place	1978 Kiev	+110kg
Gold medal – first place	1979 Leningrad	+110kg
Gold medal – first place	1981 Novosibirsk	+110kg
Summer Spartakiad of the USSR
Gold medal – first place	1979 Leningrad	+110kg
Cup of the USSR
Gold medal – first place	1976 Sverdlovsk	+110kg Snatch
Gold medal – first place	1981 Donetsk	+110kg Snatch

Sultan Saburovych Rakhmanov (Ukrainian: Султан Сабурович Рахманов; 6 July 1950 – 5 May 2003) was an Olympic weightlifter for the USSR who won the gold medal in the super heavyweight class of the 1980 Summer Olympics. Sultan Rakhmanov won the super heavyweight gold medal in 1980 in Moscow when his legendary teammate Vasily Alekseyev was eliminated after he failed three times to snatch 180 kg. Rakhmanov made 6 perfect lifts to score a decisive victory at the 1980 Olympics. He also won gold medals at the World Weightlifting Championships in 1979 and 1980.

Rakhmanov's father was Uzbek and his mother was Ukrainian, he was born in Uzbekistan. He trained during his weightlifting career in Dnipropetrovsk, Ukraine. Rakhmanov was a member of the Soviet national weightlifting team for 9 years. His most memorable victory was the super heavyweight class gold medal at the 1980 Olympics. For that victory, Rakhmanov was awarded Order of the Red Banner of Labour in Kremlin.

After his retirement, Rakhmanov was the Chairman of the International Association of Disabled Sports Veterans. Sultan was an honored President of the Aikido Federation of Ukraine. He also was one of the pioneers of organized arm wrestling in the Soviet Union.

Rakhmanov died of a heart attack on 5 May 2003, at age 52.

== Weightlifting achievements ==
- Gold medalist 1980 Summer Olympics.
- World Weightlifting Championships gold medalist (1979 and 1980).
- European Weightlifting Championships gold medalist (1980).
- Set two world records during career.
