= György Szalai =

Hungarian weightlifter (born 1951)

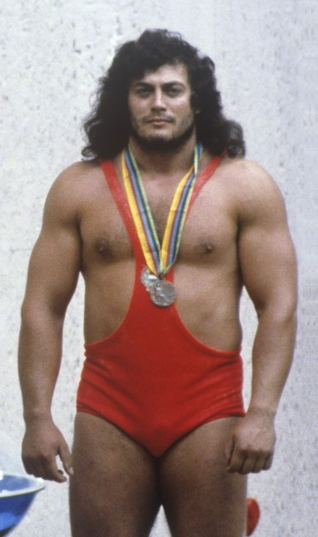
- Szalai at the 1980 Olympics

Personal information
- Born: 14 February 1951 (age 75) Gádoros, Hungary
- Height: 180 cm (5 ft 11 in)
- Weight: 108 kg (238 lb)

Sport
- Sport: Weightlifting
- Club: Tatabányai SC
Medal record
Representing Hungary
Olympic Games
| Bronze medal – third place | 1980 Moscow | -110 kg |

György Szalai (born 14 February 1951) is a retired Hungarian heavyweight weightlifter who won a bronze medal at the 1980 Olympics.
