= Bertalan Mandzák =

Hungarian weightlifter

Personal information
- Nationality: Hungarian
- Born: 21 July 1957 (age 68); Vásárosnamény, Hungary

Sport
- Sport: Weightlifting

Bertalan Mandzák (born 21 July 1957) is a Hungarian weightlifter. He competed in the men's light heavyweight event at the 1980 Summer Olympics.
