= Ho Bong-chol =

North Korean weightlifter (born 1959)

Personal information
- Native name: 허봉철
- Nationality: North Korean
- Born: 21 August 1959 (age 67)

Sport
- Sport: Weightlifting
Medal record
Representing PRK
Men's weightlifting
Olympic Games
Silver medal – second place	1980 Moscow	52 kg
World Championships
Silver medal – second place	1980 Moscow	52 kg

Ho Bong-chol (Korean: 허봉철; born 21 August 1959) is a North Korean weightlifter. He was selected to compete for North Korea at the 1980 Summer Olympics and competed in the men's flyweight event. There, he placed second and won the silver medal. As the Summer Games were held in conjunction with the 1980 World Weightlifting Championships, he won another silver medal for the Championships.

== Biography ==
Ho Bong-Chol was born on 21 August 1959. As a weightlifter, Ho represented North Korea in international competition.

He competed at the 1980 Summer Olympics held in Moscow, Soviet Union, as part of North Korea's delegation. There, he was entered in one event, the men's flyweight event for weightlifters that weighed 52 kilograms (115 lb) or less. At the competition, he weighed 51.90 kilograms (114.4 lb). There, he snatched 110 kilograms, placing tied first with two other weightlifters, and clean and jerked 135 kilograms, tying with three other weightlifters. With a total of 245 kilograms, he tied with three other weightlifters though placed second. In the event competitors in a weightlifting competition are tied, the competitor with the lighter bodyweight are placed higher. The weightlifting competitions at the 1980 Summer Games were held in conjunction with the 1980 World Weightlifting Championships and as such, Ho also won a silver medal at these Championships. He also won minor medals in the snatch and clean and jerk, winning a silver and bronze medal. His silver medal win was the first medal in weightlifting for North Korea at the Olympic Games.
