= Dušan Poliačik =

Slovak weightlifter (born 1955)

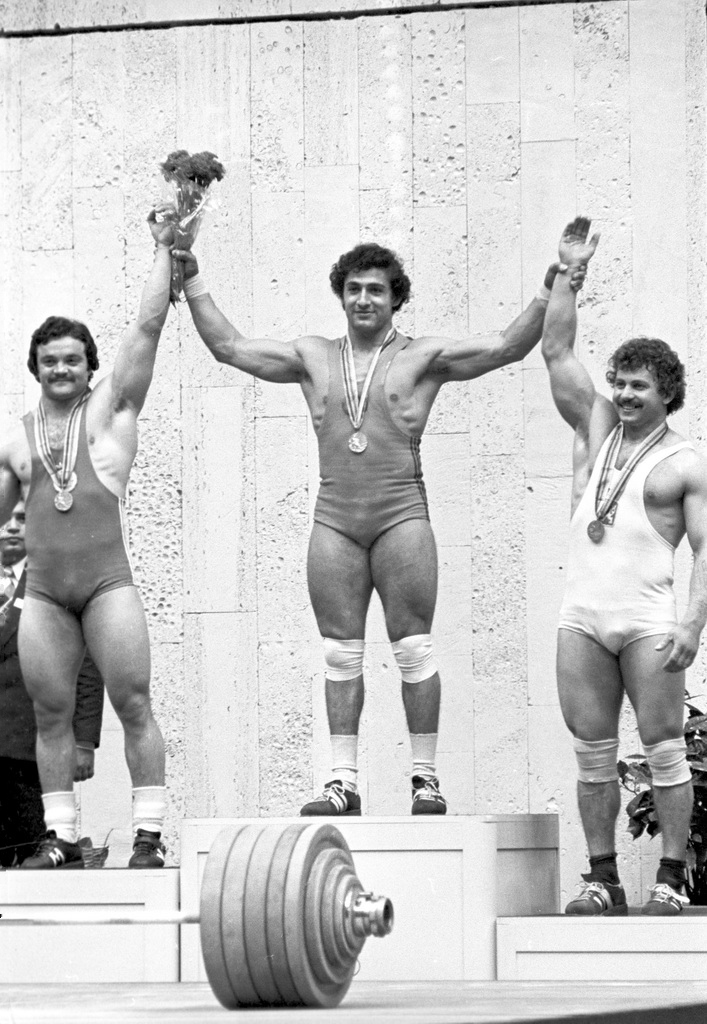
- Poliačik (right) at the 1980 Olympics

Personal information
- Born: 11 February 1955 (age 71) Dobroč, Czechoslovakia
- Height: 165 cm (5 ft 5 in)

Sport
- Sport: Weightlifting
Medal record
Representing Czechoslovakia
Olympic Games
Bronze medal – third place	1980 Moscow	-82.5 kg
World Weightlifting Championships
Bronze medal – third place	1979 Thessaloniki	-82.5 kg
Bronze medal – third place	1980 Moscow	-82.5 kg
Bronze medal – third place	1981 Lille	-82.5 kg
European Weightlifting Championships
Bronze medal – third place	1979 Varna	-82.5 kg
Bronze medal – third place	1981 Lille	-82.5 kg

Dušan Poliačik (born 11 February 1955) is a retired Slovak light-heavyweight weightlifter who won bronze medals at all major competitions in 1979–1981, including the world and European championships and the 1980 Olympics.
