= Viktor Sots =

Soviet weightlifter (born 1958)

Personal information
- Born: 1958 (age 67–68)

Sport
- Sport: Weightlifting
Medal record
Representing the Soviet Union
World Championships
Gold medal – first place	1981 Lille	-100 kg
Gold medal – first place	1982 Ljubljana	-100 kg

Viktor Petrovich Sots (Russian: Виктор Петрович Соц, born 1958) is a retired Soviet heavyweight weightlifter. In 1981–1982 he won the world and European titles and set six ratified world records: five in the clean and jerk, and one in the snatch. “The Sot Press” was named after Russian weightlifter (1981 and 1982 World Weightlifting Championships Men's 100 kg), Viktor Sots. Viktor Sots’ “claim to fame” was being the first heavy lifter to exclusively use the power jerk instead of the split jerk in competition, often seen pressing from the front rack position in the squat. Throughout the years, the “Sots press” has been used to describe any pressing movement while in the squat (behind the neck, front rack, etc.), however the original variation was performed by Viktor in the front.
