= Sergey Arakelov =

Russian weightlifter (born 1957)

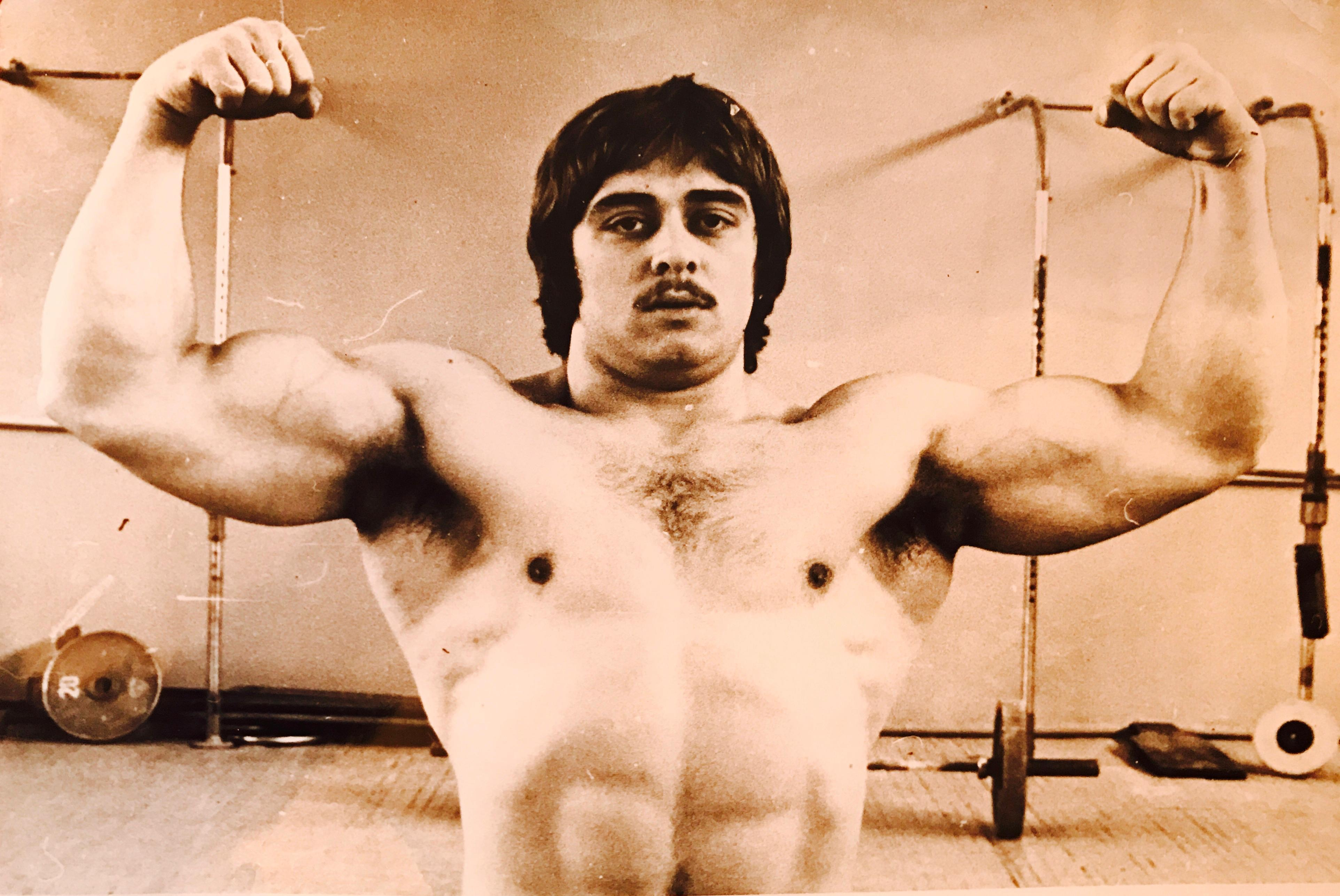

Personal information
- Born: 18 July 1957 (age 69) Krasnodar, Russia

Sport
- Sport: Weightlifting
- Coached by: Yury Sarkisyan
Medal record
Representing the Soviet Union
World Weightlifting Championships
Silver medal – second place	1978 Gettysburg	-100 kg
Gold medal – first place	1979 Saloniki	-110 kg
Gold medal – first place	1982 Ljubljana	-110 kg
European Weightlifting Championships
Gold medal – first place	1978 Havířov	-100 kg
Gold medal – first place	1982 Ljubljana	-110 kg

Sergey Alikovich Arakelov (Russian: Сергей Аликович Аракелов; born 18 July 1957) is a Russian retired heavyweight weightlifter. Between 1978 and 1982 he won two world titles and set five world records: two in the snatch, two in the clean and jerk and one in the total. While competing at the 1979 World Championships Arakelov severely injured his shoulder and recovered only by 1982. He retired in 1983 due to another injury.

After retiring from competitions Arakelov graduated in economics and served as a sports functionary. His uncle Yuri Radonyak was an Olympic medalist in boxing; his father was also a boxer and his mother competed in rhythmic gymnastics.

== Controversies ==
In 2015, in an ongoing court case, Arakelov was accused of being a pedophile and sexually harassing his then 3-year-old granddaughter, with several experts confirming the fact.
