= Pavel Khek =

Czech weightlifter

Personal information
- Nationality: Czech
- Born: 6 April 1958 (age 68) Lanškroun, Czechoslovakia

Sport
- Sport: Weightlifting

Pavel Khek (born 6 April 1958) is a Czech weightlifter. He competed in the men's heavyweight II event at the 1980 Summer Olympics.
