= Jan Lisowski =

Polish weightlifter

Personal information
- Nationality: Polish
- Born: 23 September 1952 (age 72); Olsztyn, Poland

Sport
- Sport: Weightlifting

Jan Lisowski (born 23 September 1952) is a Polish weightlifter. He competed in the men's light heavyweight event at the 1980 Summer Olympics.
