= Virgil Dociu =

Romanian weightlifter

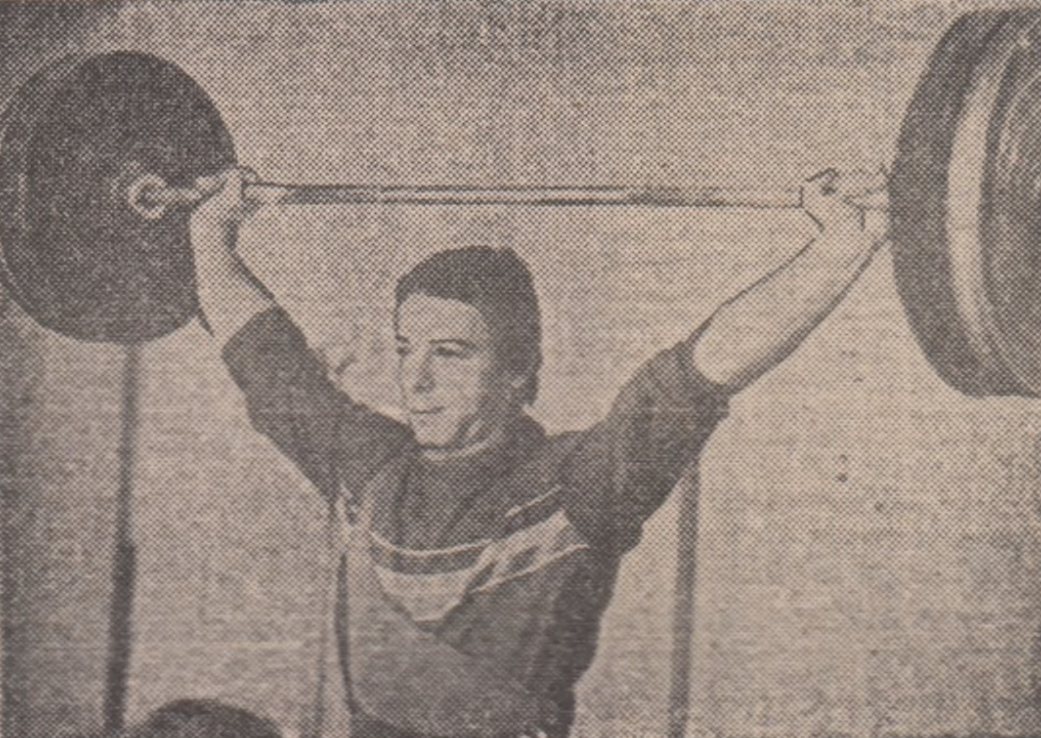

Personal information
- Nationality: Romanian
- Born: 3 December 1953 (age 71); Bucharest, Romania

Sport
- Sport: Weightlifting

Virgil Dociu (born 3 December 1953) is a Romanian weightlifter. He competed in the men's lightweight event at the 1980 Summer Olympics.
