= Rumen Aleksandrov =

Bulgarian weightlifter (born 1960)

Personal information
- Born: 26 July 1960 (age 66)
Medal record
Men's Weightlifting
Representing Bulgaria
Olympic Games
Silver medal – second place	1980 Moscow	90 kg

Rumen Aleksandrov (Bulgarian: Румен Александров) (born 26 June 1960) is a Bulgarian weightlifter. He won the silver medal in the 90 Kg class in the 1980 Summer Olympics in Moscow. He was champion of Europe in 1980, in Belgrade, Serbia. Aleksandrov was also world and European junior champion in 1978 in Athens, Greece.

He started training weightlifting in 1971 under Gancho Karushkov. He graduated from the Vasil Levski Sports School and competed for the team of Maritsa Plovdiv (1971 – 1978) and for the team of CSKA (1978 – 1982). Since 1982 he has been a coach at the team of CSKA. Between 1989 and 1992 he worked with the national team of Bulgaria. He shared his experience in many countries around the world, including the United States, Colombia and El Salvador.
