= Vyacheslav Klokov =

Russian weightlifter

Vyacheslav Klokov (Вячеслав Клоков)
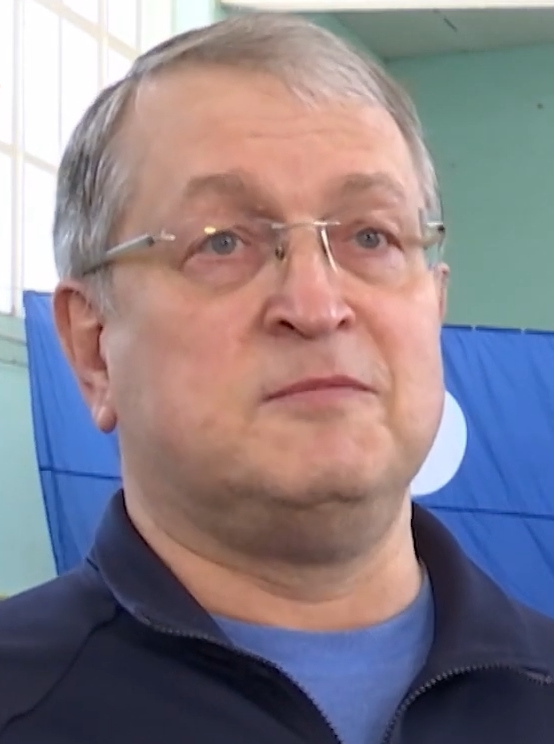
- Klokov in 2021

Personal information
- Full name: Vyacheslav Ivanovich Klokov
- Nationality: Russian
- Born: September 2, 1959 (age 66) Arzamas, Russia

Sport
- Country: Russia
- Sport: Weightlifting
- Weight class: Heavyweight (110kg)
Medal record
Representing Soviet Union
World Championships
Silver medal – second place	1981 Lille	110 kg
Silver medal – second place	1982 Ljubljana	110 kg
Gold medal – first place	1983 Moscow	110 kg

Vyacheslav Ivanovich Klokov (Russian: Вячеслав Иванович Клоков, born 1959) is a retired Russian heavyweight weightlifter. He won the world and European titles in 1983, placing second in 1981 and 1982. Between 1980 and 1983 he set seven ratified world records. After retiring from competitions he headed the Russian Weightlifting Federation and served as vice-president of the European Weightlifting Federation. His son Dmitry Klokov became an Olympic heavyweight weightlifter.
