= Frank Mantek =

German weightlifter

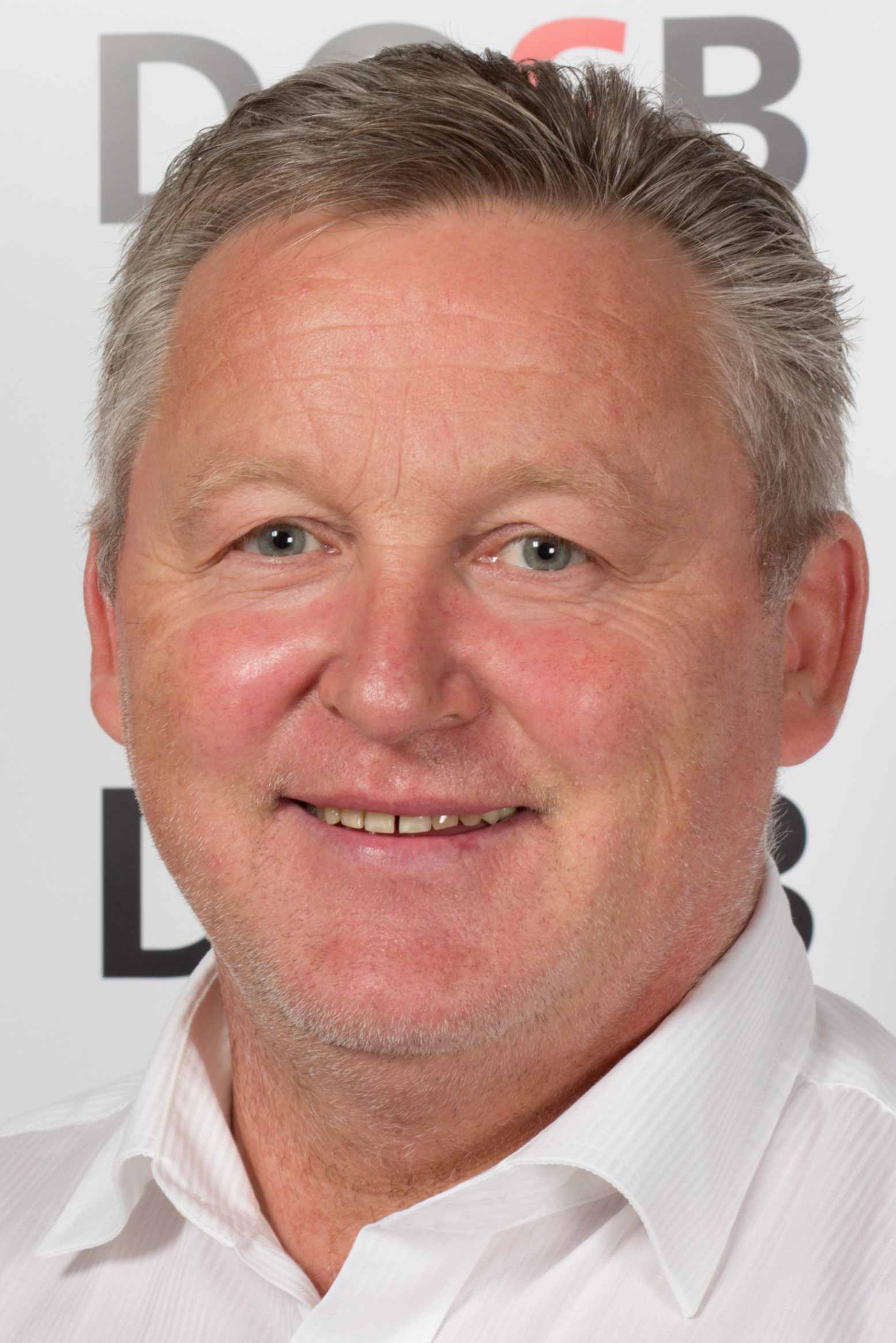
- Frank Mantek in 2012

Personal information
- Born: 20 January 1959 (age 67) Jena, Bezirk Gera, East Germany
- Height: 1.74 m (5 ft 9 in)
- Weight: 89 kg (196 lb)

Sport
- Sport: Weightlifting
- Club: SC Karl-Marx-Stadt
Medal record
Representing East Germany
Olympic Games
Bronze medal – third place	1980 Moscow	Middle-heavyweight; 165+205 kg
World Championships
Bronze medal – third place	1980 Moscow	Middle-heavyweight; 165+205 kg
Bronze medal – third place	1982 Ljubljana	Middle-heavyweight; 170+207.5 kg
European Championships
Bronze medal – third place	1982 Ljubljana	Middle-heavyweight; 170+207.5 kg

Frank Mantek (born 20 January 1959) is a German weightlifting coach and a retired weightlifter. He won a bronze medal at the 1980 Summer Olympics in the middle-heavyweight (under 90 kg) category, which also qualified as a bronze medal at world championships. In 1982 he won another combined bronze medal in the world/European championships.

He retired in 1983 and later admitted taking the performance-enhancing drug Oral Turinabol as part of the East German training system. According to the doping expert Werner Franke, with an annual dose of 7600 mg Mantek was the second most doped East German athlete. Since 1990 he is a head coach of the German Weightlifting Federation, raising such athletes as Matthias Steiner. He suffered a heart attack in 1995, which he attributed to his past doping practice.
