= Vinzenz Hörtnagl =

Austrian weightlifter (born 1948)

Personal information
- Nationality: Austrian
- Born: 9 June 1948 (age 77) Fulpmes, Austria

Sport
- Sport: Weightlifting

Vinzenz Hörtnagl (born 9 June 1948) is an Austrian weightlifter. He competed at the 1976 Summer Olympics and the 1980 Summer Olympics.
