= Stefan Leletko =

Polish weightlifter (1953–2012)

Personal information
- Born: 2 September 1953 Świdnica, Poland
- Died: 5 October 2012 (aged 59) Opole, Poland
- Height: 150 cm (4 ft 11 in)

Sport
- Country: Poland
- Sport: Weightlifting
- Weight class: 52 kg
- Club: ŁKS Świdnica
- Team: National team
Medal record
Men's Weightlifting
Representing Poland
World Championships
Gold medal – first place	1982 Ljubljana	52 kg
Bronze medal – third place	1983 Moscow	52 kg
- Updated on 6 October 2016

Stefan Leletko (2 September 1953 in Świdnica – 9 October 2012 in Opole) was a Polish weightlifter who competed in the flyweight class and represented Poland in international competitions. He won a gold medal in the 52 kg category at the 1982 World Weightlifting Championships. He competed in 52 kg event at both the 1976 Summer Olympics and 1980 Summer Olympics.
