= Bohuslav Braum =

Czech weightlifter

Personal information
- Nationality: Czech
- Born: 22 February 1956 (age 70) Prague, Czechoslovakia

Sport
- Sport: Weightlifting

Bohuslav Braum (born 22 February 1956) is a Czech weightlifter. He competed in the men's super heavyweight event at the 1980 Summer Olympics.
