= Oleksandr Perviy =

Soviet weightlifter (1960–1985)

Personal information
- Born: 28 October 1960 Bilozerske, Ukrainian SSR, Soviet Union
- Died: 25 September 1985 (aged 24) Donetsk, Ukrainian SSR, Soviet Union
- Height: 1.67 m (5 ft 6 in)
- Weight: 74 kg (163 lb)

Sport
- Sport: Weightlifting
- Club: Soviet Armed Forces
Medal record
Representing the Soviet Union
Olympic Games
Silver medal – second place	1980 Moscow	-75 kg
World Weightlifting Championships
Silver medal – second place	1980 Moscow	-75 kg
Silver medal – second place	1981 Lille	-75 kg
Silver medal – second place	1982 Ljubljana	-82.5 kg
European Weightlifting Championships
Bronze medal – third place	1980 Belgrade	-75 kg
Silver medal – second place	1981 Lille	-75 kg
Silver medal – second place	1982 Ljubljana	-82.5 kg

Oleksandr Ivanovych Perviy (Ukrainian: Олександр Іванович Первій, 28 October 1960 – 25 September 1985) was a Ukrainian weightlifter. Between 1980 and 1982 he won a silver medal at the 1980 Summer Olympics and six medals at the world and European championships; he also set four world records: three in the clean and jerk and one in the total.

Perviy was known for his weak health and drinking habits. In early 1983, he had his first heart attack, which forced him to retire from sports and from the Soviet Army. Depression and lack of a job resulted in alcoholism and consequent death from another heart attack at the age of 24.
