= Daniel Núñez (weightlifter) =

Cuban weightlifter (born 1958)

Medal record

Representing Cuba

Men's weightlifting

Olympic Games
Gold medal – first place	1980 Moscow	-56 kg

World Championships
Gold medal – first place	1978 Gettysburg	-56 kg
Gold medal – first place	1980 Moscow	-56 kg

Daniel Núñez Aguiar (born 12 September 1958 in Santiago de Cuba) is a Cuban weightlifter.

He won a gold medal in the bantamweight class at the 1979 Pan American Games in San Juan and at the 1980 Summer Olympics in Moscow.

Núñez set a world record for the snatch at the 1982 Central American and Caribbean Games.

At the 1983 Pan American Games Núñez and three other lifters were stripped of their medals for use of anabolic steroids.
