= Tadeusz Rutkowski =

Polish weightlifter (born 1951)

Olympic medal record

Men's weightlifting

Representing Poland
Bronze medal – third place	1976 Montreal	heavyweight
Bronze medal – third place	1980 Moskva	super-heavyweight

Tadeusz Rutkowski (born 25 April 1951 in Kraków) is a Polish former weightlifter who competed in the 1976 Summer Olympics and in the 1980 Summer Olympics.
