= Andrzej Piotrowski (weightlifter) =

Polish weightlifter

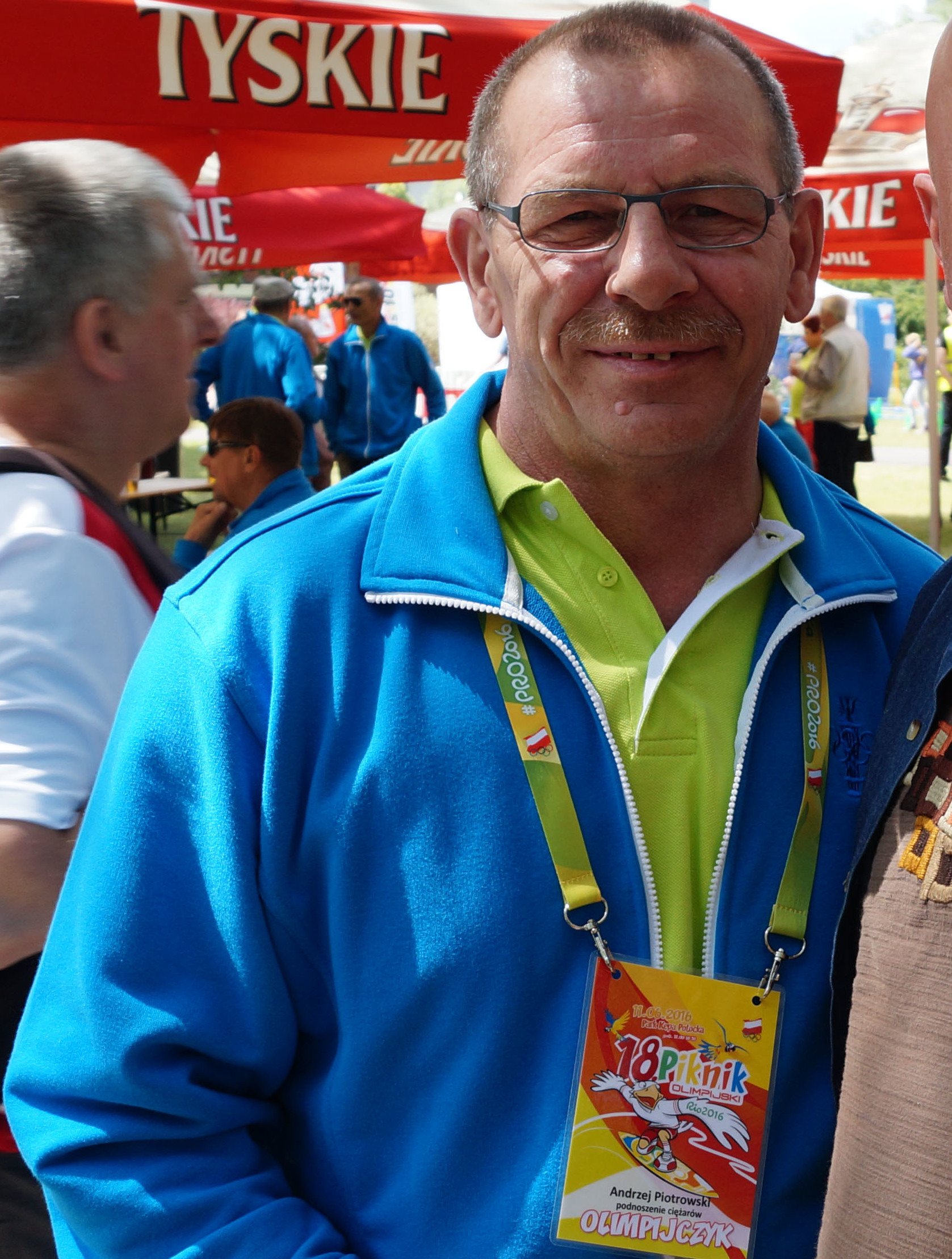
- Piotrowski in 2016

Personal information
- Nationality: Polish
- Born: 27 January 1958 (age 67) Pułtusk, Poland

Sport
- Sport: Weightlifting

Andrzej Piotrowski (born 27 January 1958) is a Polish weightlifter. He competed in the men's middle heavyweight event at the 1988 Summer Olympics.
