= Bruno Matykiewicz =

Polish Czech weightlifter

Bruno Matykiewicz (born 21 April 1959) is a Polish Czech former weightlifter. He represented Czechoslovakia.

Matykiewicz was born on 21 April 1959 in Stonava in the region of Trans-Olza and lived in Albrechtice. He is a member of the local MK PZKO Olbrachcice.

In 1981, he earned two silver medals at the World and European Championships in Lille. In 1982, Matykiewicz earned two bronze medals at the World and European Championships in Ljubljana. Several weeks after these championships, he made his personal best by lifting in total 412.5 kg (185+227.5). He was forced to end his promising career prematurely in 1983 due to health problems. He was also a six-time champion of Czechoslovakia in several age categories.
