= Andreas Letz =

German weightlifter

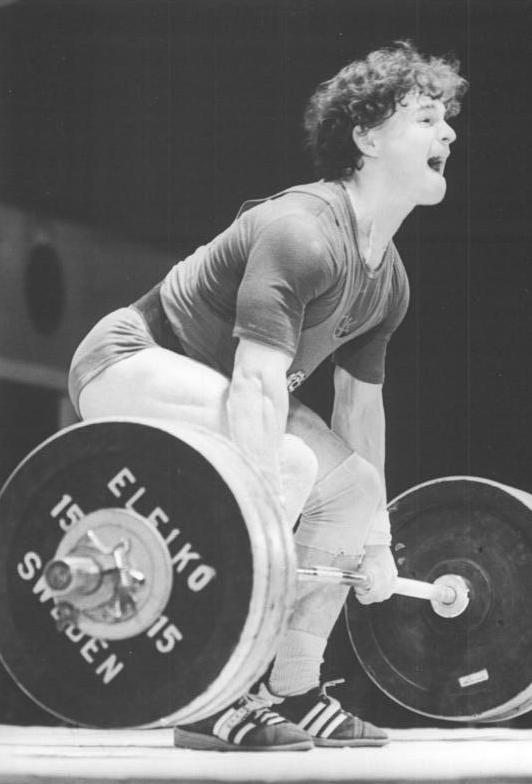

Medal record

Men's Weightlifting

Representing East Germany

World Championships
Bronze medal – third place	1986 Sofia	60 kg
Bronze medal – third place	1985 Södertälje	60 kg
Bronze medal – third place	1983 Moscow	56kg
Silver medal – second place	1981 Lille	56kg

European Championships
Bronze medal – third place	1986 Karl-Marx-Stadt	60 kg
Bronze medal – third place	1985 Katowice	60 kg
Bronze medal – third place	1983 Moscow	56 kg
Silver medal – second place	1981 Lille	56 kg
Silver medal – second place	1980 Belgrade	56 kg

Andreas Letz (born 5 June 1962 in Sömmerda, Bezirk Erfurt) is a German weightlifter. He competed in the 56 kg and 60 kg categories, and set two world records in the clean and jerk, and one in the total.

Competing for the German Democratic Republic, he ranked fourth in the 56 kg category at the 1980 Summer Olympics.

Letz ranked overall second at the 1981 World Weightlifting Championships, and ranked third in World Championships three times in 1983, 1985, and 1986. In European Championships, he ranked overall second in 1980 and 1981, and third in 1983, 1985, and 1986.
