= Daniel Senet =

French weightlifter (1953–2026)

Medal record

Men's Weightlifting

Representing France

Olympic Games
Silver medal – second place	1976 Montreal	Lightweight

Daniel Senet

Daniel Senet (26 June 1953 – 16 June 2026) was a French weightlifter and Olympic medalist. He received a silver medal at the 1976 Summer Olympics in Montreal. He finished 4th at the 1980 Summer Olympics in Moscow.

Senet was born in Amiens on 26 June 1953, and died on 16 June 2026, at the age of 72.
