= Kanybek Osmonaliyev =

Soviet weightlifter

Kanybek Osmonaliyevich Osmonaliyev (Russian: Каныбек Осмоналиевич Осмоналиев; born November 19, 1953, in Beysheke, Kirghiz SSR) is a former Soviet weightlifter, Olympic champion and world champion. He won gold medal in the flyweight class at the 1980 Summer Olympics in Moscow. He was affiliated with Burevestnik Frunze. Later, he was active in national political posts, including as "Chairman of the National Commission for Kyrgyz Language and Language Policy" (12 May 2022 – 5 March 2024).
