= Joachim Kunz =

German weightlifter

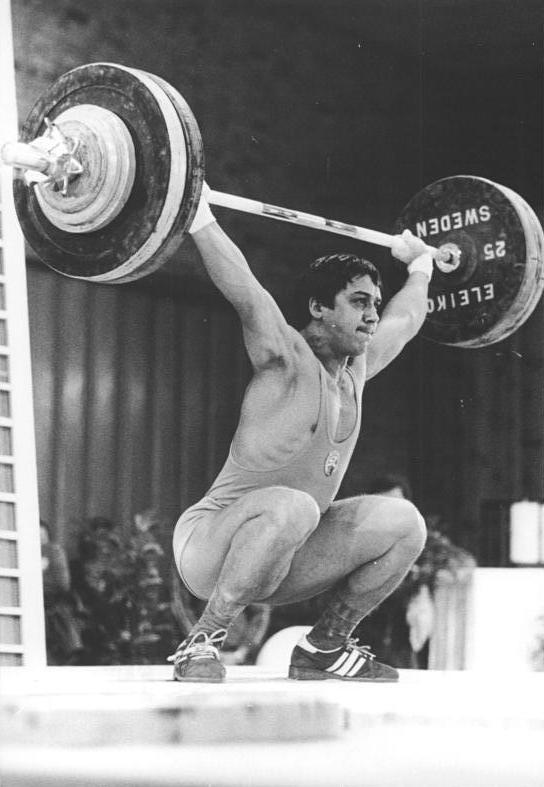
- Kunz at the 1980 GDR Championships

Personal information
- Born: 9 February 1959 (age 67) Stollberg, East Germany
Medal record
Men's weightlifting
Representing East Germany
Olympic Games
Gold medal – first place	1988 Seoul	–67.5 kg
Silver medal – second place	1980 Moscow	–67.5 kg

Joachim Kunz (born 9 February 1959) is a German weightlifter who competed for East Germany in the 1980 Summer Olympics and in the 1988 Summer Olympics. He was born in Stollberg.

At the 1980 Summer Olympics in Moscow he won a silver medal in the 67.5 kg (149 lb) class. He won gold at the 1981 and 1983 World Championships. At the 1988 Summer Olympics in Seoul he won a gold medal in the 67.5 kg (149 lb) class.

As of 2008, Kunz is head of German instant soup manufacturer Suppina.

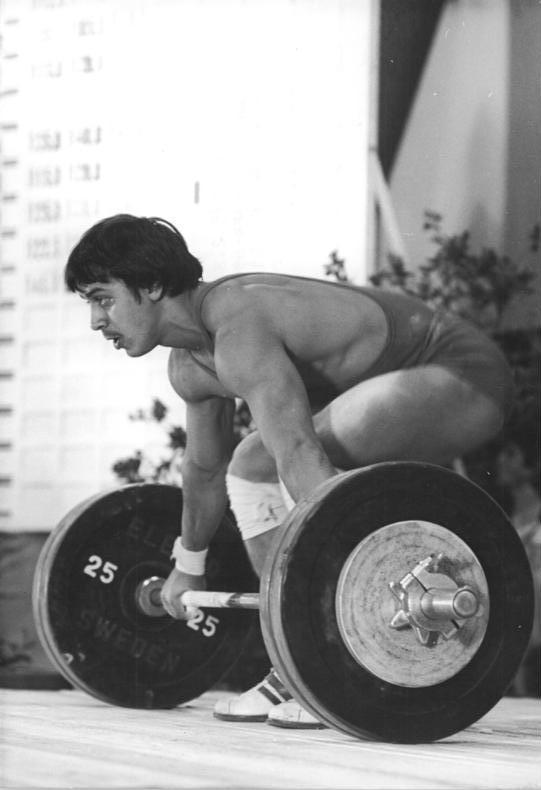
Kunz in 1984
