= Izmailovo Sports Palace =

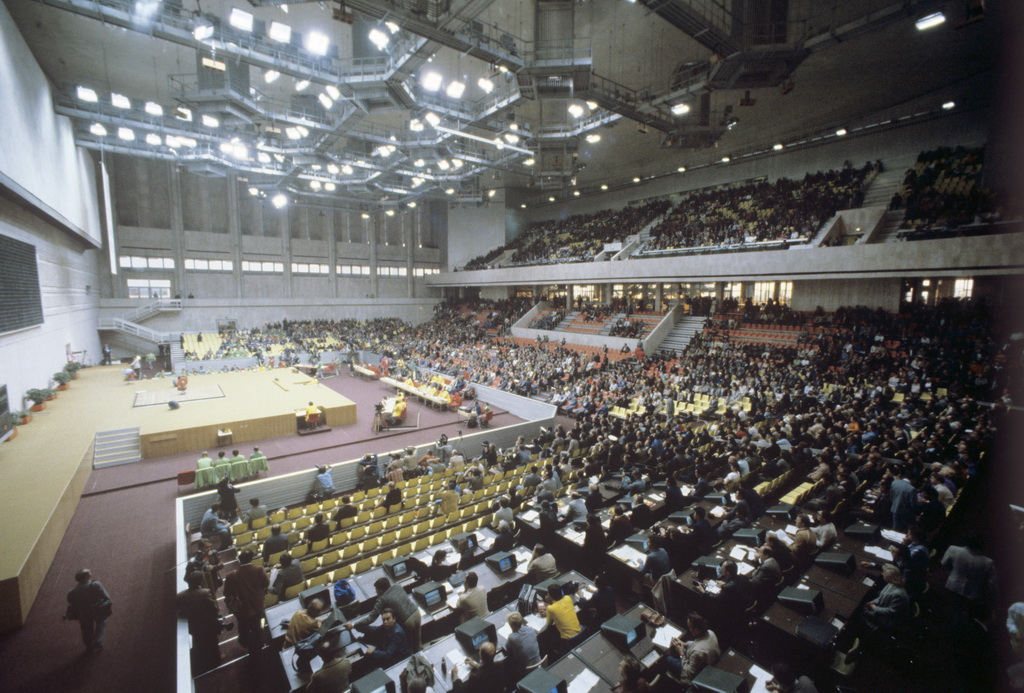
Izmailovo Sports Palace hosting 1980 Summer Olympics weightlifting competition

The Izmailovo Sports Palace is an indoor arena located in the Eastern Planning Zone in Moscow, Russia. It hosted the weightlifting competitions for the 1980 Summer Olympics.

After the Olympic Games, it became part of the sports facilities complex of the Russian State University of Physical Education, Sport, Youth and Tourism. Additional construction involved a figure skating training arena, a mini-football and ice hockey arena, a choreography hall and an athletic training hall.
