= List of junior world records in Olympic weightlifting =

The following are the junior world records in Olympic weightlifting. They are the best results set in competition by athletes aged 15 to 20 throughout the entire calendar year of the performance. Records are maintained in each weight class for the snatch, clean and jerk, and total for both lifts by the International Weightlifting Federation (IWF).

The recognition of the junior classification and subsequent record keeping began in 1962 for men and 1995 for women. The first stand-alone Junior World Championships were held in 1975 for men and 1995 for women.

== Current records ==
Key to tables: Awaiting ratification Not ratified or later rescinded by IWF

=== Men ===
Event	Record	Athlete	Nation	Date	Meet	Place	Age	Ref
60 kg
Snatch	132 kg	Yuan Hao	China	3 October 2025	World Championships	Førde, Norway	19 years, 104 days	
Clean & Jerk	164 kg	K'Duong	Vietnam	13 December 2025	SEA Games	Chonburi, Thailand	18 years, 163 days	
Total	290 kg	World Standard						
65 kg
Snatch	139 kg	World Standard						
Clean & Jerk	174 kg	El-Sayed Aly Attia	Egypt	9 October 2026	African Junior Championships	Mostaganem, Algeria	20 years, 280 days	
Total	308 kg	World Standard						
70 kg
Snatch	144 kg	World Standard						
Clean & Jerk	187 kg	Albert Delos Santos	Philippines	30 October 2026	World Championships	Ningbo, China	20 years, 79 days	
Total	331 kg	Albert Delos Santos	Philippines	30 October 2026	World Championships	Ningbo, China	20 years, 79 days	
75 kg
Snatch	152 kg	Didarbek Jumabaýew	Turkmenistan	31 October 2026	World Championships	Ningbo, China	18 years, 158 days	
Clean & Jerk	188 kg	Didarbek Jumabaýew	Turkmenistan	31 October 2026	World Championships	Ningbo, China	18 years, 158 days	
Total	340 kg	Didarbek Jumabaýew	Turkmenistan	31 October 2026	World Championships	Ningbo, China	18 years, 158 days	
85 kg
Snatch	170 kg	Ángel Rodríguez	Venezuela	2 November 2026	World Championships	Ningbo, China	20 years, 70 days	
Clean & Jerk	203 kg	Ángel Rodríguez	Venezuela	16 September 2026	South American Games	Rosario, Argentina	20 years, 23 days	
Total	367 kg	Ángel Rodríguez	Venezuela	16 September 2026	South American Games	Rosario, Argentina	20 years, 23 days	
95 kg
Snatch	174 kg	World Standard						
Clean & Jerk	214 kg	Hamidreza Zarei	Iran	13 August 2026	Asian Junior Championships	Tashkent, Uzbekistan	19 years, 25 days	
Total	382 kg	World Standard						
110 kg
Snatch	189 kg	World Standard						
Clean & Jerk	231 kg	Alireza Nassiri	Iran	10 October 2025	World Championships	Førde, Norway	19 years, 300 days	
Total	415 kg	Alireza Nassiri	Iran	10 October 2025	World Championships	Førde, Norway	19 years, 300 days	
+110 kg
Snatch	197 kg	World Standard						
Clean & Jerk	235 kg	World Standard						
Total	431 kg	World Standard						

=== Women ===
Event	Record	Athlete	Nation	Date	Meet	Place	Age	Ref
49 kg
Snatch	88 kg	World Standard						
Clean & Jerk	114 kg	World Standard						
Total	202 kg	World Standard						
53 kg
Snatch	93 kg	World Standard						
Clean & Jerk	120 kg	World Standard						
Total	212 kg	World Standard						
57 kg
Snatch	97 kg	World Standard						
Clean & Jerk	123 kg	World Standard						
Total	219 kg	World Standard						
61 kg
Snatch	112 kg	Yang Liuyue	China	25 September 2026	Asian Games	Nagoya, Japan	19 years, 289 days	
Clean & Jerk	139 kg	Yang Liuyue	China	25 September 2026	Asian Games	Nagoya, Japan	19 years, 289 days	
Total	251 kg	Yang Liuyue	China	25 September 2026	Asian Games	Nagoya, Japan	19 years, 289 days	
69 kg
Snatch	110 kg	Charlotte Simoneau	Canada	22 August 2025	Junior Pan American Games	Asunción, Paraguay	20 years, 84 days	
Clean & Jerk	138 kg	Lin Jingwei	China	5 May 2026	World Junior Championships	Ismailia, Egypt	18 years, 100 days	
Total	245 kg	Lin Jingwei	China	5 May 2026	World Junior Championships	Ismailia, Egypt	18 years, 100 days	
77 kg
Snatch	116 kg	World Standard						
Clean & Jerk	144 kg	World Standard						
Total	257 kg	World Standard						
86 kg
Snatch	123 kg	World Standard						
Clean & Jerk	152 kg	World Standard						
Total	271 kg	World Standard						
+86 kg
Snatch	143 kg	World Standard						
Clean & Jerk	180 kg	World Standard						
Total	320 kg	World Standard						

== Historical records ==
=== Men (2025–2026) ===
Event	Record	Athlete	Nation	Date	Meet	Place	Age	Ref
71 kg
Snatch	148 kg	World Standard						
Clean & Jerk	187 kg	Albert Delos Santos	Philippines	4 May 2026	World Junior Championships	Ismailia, Egypt	19 years, 265 days	
Total	328 kg	World Standard						
79 kg
Snatch	160 kg	World Standard						
Clean & Jerk	196 kg	World Standard						
Total	351 kg	World Standard						
88 kg
Snatch	171 kg	World Standard						
Clean & Jerk	209 kg	World Standard						
Total	374 kg	World Standard						
94 kg
Snatch	177 kg	World Standard						
Clean & Jerk	216 kg	World Standard						
Total	387 kg	World Standard						

=== Men (2018–2025) ===
Event	Record	Athlete	Nation	Date	Meet	Place	Age	Ref
–55 kg
Snatch	123 kg	Kotaro Tomari	Japan	30 April 2025	World Junior Championships	Lima, Peru	19 years, 303 days	
Clean & Jerk	148 kg	Theerapong Silachai	Thailand	6 December 2022	World Championships	Bogotá, Colombia	19 years, 17 days	
Total	266 kg	Kotaro Tomari	Japan	30 April 2025	World Junior Championships	Lima, Peru	19 years, 303 days	
–61 kg
Snatch	136 kg	Adkhamjon Ergashev	Uzbekistan	3 November 2018	World Championships	Ashgabat, Turkmenistan	19 years, 236 days	
Clean & Jerk	176 kg	Hampton Morris	United States	2 April 2024	World Cup	Phuket, Thailand	20 years, 45 days	
Total	307 kg	Pak Myong-jin	North Korea	1 October 2023	Asian Games	Hangzhou, China	20 years, 182 days	
–67 kg
Snatch	148 kg	Kaan Kahriman	Turkey	8 December 2024	World Championships	Manama, Bahrain	19 years, 365 days	
Clean & Jerk	182 kg	Adkhamjon Ergashev	Uzbekistan	20 September 2019	World Championships	Pattaya, Thailand	20 years, 192 days	
Total	328 kg	Adkhamjon Ergashev	Uzbekistan	20 September 2019	World Championships	Pattaya, Thailand	20 years, 192 days	
–73 kg
Snatch	157 kg	Rizki Juniansyah	Indonesia	21 July 2022	Asian Youth & Junior Championships	Tashkent, Uzbekistan	19 years, 34 days	
Clean & Jerk	198 kg	Weeraphon Wichuma	Thailand	8 August 2024	Olympic Games	Paris, France	19 years, 30 days	
Total	351 kg	Weeraphon Wichuma	Thailand	3 October 2023	Asian Games	Hangzhou, China	19 years, 54 days	
–81 kg
Snatch	168 kg	Li Dayin	China	5 November 2018	World Championships	Ashgabat, Turkmenistan	20 years, 266 days	
Clean & Jerk	208 kg	Karlos Nasar	Bulgaria	12 December 2021	World Championships	Tashkent, Uzbekistan	17 years, 214 days	
Total	374 kg	Karlos Nasar	Bulgaria	12 December 2021	World Championships	Tashkent, Uzbekistan	17 years, 214 days	
–89 kg
Snatch	183 kg	Karlos Nasar	Bulgaria	11 December 2024	World Championships	Manama, Bahrain	20 years, 213 days	
Clean & Jerk	224 kg	Karlos Nasar	Bulgaria	9 August 2024	Olympic Games	Paris, France	20 years, 89 days	
Total	405 kg	Karlos Nasar	Bulgaria	11 December 2024	World Championships	Manama, Bahrain	20 years, 213 days	
–96 kg
Snatch	180 kg	Yauheni Tsikhantsou	Belarus	7 November 2018	World Championships	Ashgabat, Turkmenistan	20 years, 3 days	
Clean & Jerk	225 kg	Faris Ibrahim	Qatar	21 December 2018	Qatar Cup	Doha, Qatar	20 years, 200 days	
Total	397 kg	Faris Ibrahim	Qatar	21 December 2018	Qatar Cup	Doha, Qatar	20 years, 200 days	
–102 kg
Snatch	183 kg	Garik Karapetyan	Armenia	14 September 2023	World Championships	Riyadh, Saudi Arabia	20 years, 95 days	
Clean & Jerk	220 kg	Matheus Pessanha	Brazil	4 May 2025	World Junior Championships	Lima, Peru	19 years, 250 days	
Total	396 kg	Şahzadbek Matýakubow	Turkmenistan	24 December 2024	Asian Junior Championships	Doha, Qatar	20 years, 298 days	
–109 kg
Snatch	195 kg	Bohdan Hoza	Ukraine	9 May 2022	Junior World Championships	Heraklion, Greece	20 years, 81 days	
Clean & Jerk	229 kg	Akbar Djuraev	Uzbekistan	26 September 2019	World Championships	Pattaya, Thailand	19 years, 353 days	
Total	417 kg	Akbar Djuraev	Uzbekistan	26 September 2019	World Championships	Pattaya, Thailand	19 years, 353 days	
+109 kg
Snatch	204 kg	Ali Rubaiawi	Iraq	15 December 2024	World Championships	Manama, Bahrain	20 years, 135 days	
Clean & Jerk	247 kg	Ali Rubaiawi	Iraq	15 December 2024	World Championships	Manama, Bahrain	20 years, 135 days	
Total	451 kg	Ali Rubaiawi	Iraq	15 December 2024	World Championships	Manama, Bahrain	20 years, 135 days	

=== Men (1998–2018) ===
Event	Record	Athlete	Nation	Date	Meet	Place	Age	Ref
–56 kg
Snatch	135 kg	Thạch Kim Tuấn	Vietnam	8 November 2014	World Championships	Almaty, Kazakhstan	20 years, 248 days	
Clean & Jerk	165 kg	Wu Wenxiong	China	20 May 2001	East Asian Games	Osaka, Japan	20 years, 98 days	
Total	296 kg	Thạch Kim Tuấn	Vietnam	8 November 2014	World Championships	Almaty, Kazakhstan	20 years, 248 days	
–62 kg
Snatch	152 kg	Shi Zhiyong	China	3 May 2000	Asian Championships	Osaka, Japan	20 years, 83 days	
Clean & Jerk	177 kg	Yang Fan	China	22 April 2007	Asian Championships	Tai'an, China	19 years, 188 days	
Total	322 kg	Shi Zhiyong	China	3 May 2000	Asian Championships	Osaka, Japan	20 years, 83 days	
–69 kg
Snatch	158 kg	Tigran G. Martirosyan	Armenia	17 April 2008	European Championships	Lignano S., Italy	19 years, 313 days	
Clean & Jerk	190 kg	Liao Hui	China	28 November 2007	World Cup	Apia, Samoa	20 years, 54 days	
Total	346 kg	Tigran G. Martirosyan	Armenia	17 April 2008	European Championships	Lignano S., Italy	19 years, 313 days	
–77 kg
Snatch	172 kg	Taner Sağır	Turkey	19 August 2004	Olympic Games	Athens, Greece	19 years, 159 days	
Clean & Jerk	202 kg	Taner Sağır	Turkey	19 August 2004	Olympic Games	Athens, Greece	19 years, 159 days	
Total	375 kg	Taner Sağır	Turkey	19 August 2004	Olympic Games	Athens, Greece	19 years, 159 days	
–85 kg
Snatch	182 kg	Andrei Rybakou	Belarus	2 June 2002	World Junior Championships	Havířov, Czech Republic	20 years, 90 days	
Clean & Jerk	218 kg	Tian Tao	China	24 September 2014	Asian Games	Incheon, South Korea	20 years, 169 days	
Total	386 kg	Ilya Ilin	Kazakhstan	14 November 2005	World Championships	Doha, Qatar	17 years, 174 days	
–94 kg
Snatch	185 kg	Khadzhimurat Akkayev	Russia	29 May 2004	World Junior Championships	Minsk, Belarus	19 years, 67 days	
Clean & Jerk	232 kg	Szymon Kołecki	Poland	29 April 2000	European Championships	Sofia, Bulgaria	18 years, 212 days	
Total	412 kg	Szymon Kołecki	Poland	29 April 2000	European Championships	Sofia, Bulgaria	18 years, 212 days	
–105 kg
Snatch	200 kg	Andrei Aramnau	Belarus	18 August 2008	Olympic Games	Beijing, China	20 years, 123 days	
Clean & Jerk	236 kg	Andrei Aramnau	Belarus	18 August 2008	Olympic Games	Beijing, China	20 years, 123 days	
Total	436 kg	Andrei Aramnau	Belarus	18 August 2008	Olympic Games	Beijing, China	20 years, 123 days	
+105 kg
Snatch	206 kg	Saeid Alihosseini	Iran	8 December 2008	Asian Junior Championships	Jeonju, South Korea	20 years, 310 days	
Clean & Jerk	245 kg	Saeid Alihosseini	Iran	8 December 2008	Asian Junior Championships	Jeonju, South Korea	20 years, 310 days	
Total	451 kg	Saeid Alihosseini	Iran	8 December 2008	Asian Junior Championships	Jeonju, South Korea	20 years, 310 days	

=== Men (1993–1997) ===
Event	Record	Athlete	Nation	Date	Meet	Place	Age	Ref
54 kg
Snatch	125 kg	Sevdalin Minchev	Bulgaria	4 May 1994	European Championships	Sokolov, Czech Republic	19 years, 283 days	
Clean & Jerk	153 kg	Lan Shizhang	China	26 July 1994	Junior World Championships	Jakarta, Indonesia	20 years, 167 days	
Total	275 kg	World Standard						
59 kg
Snatch	133 kg	Shi Zhiyong	China	21 November 1996		Seoul, South Korea	16 years, 285 days	
Clean & Jerk	167.5 kg	Li Chuanghuan	China	18 November 1995	World Championships	Guangzhou, China		
Total	295 kg	Liao Weixiao	China	7 May 1996	Junior World Championships	Warsaw, Poland	20 years, 127 days	
64 kg
Snatch	145 kg	Wang Guohua	China	19 November 1995	World Championships	Guangzhou, China	20 years, 293 days	
Clean & Jerk	175 kg	Idalberto Aranda	Cuba	13 March 1995		Mar del Plata, Argentina	19 years, 288 days	
Total	315 kg	Peng Song	China	19 November 1995	World Championships	Guangzhou, China		
70 kg
Snatch	147.5 kg	World Standard						
Clean & Jerk	190 kg	Idalberto Aranda	Cuba	12 September 1995		Sancti Spíritus, Cuba	20 years, 106 days	
Total	330 kg	Zhan Xugang	China	7 October 1994	Asian Games	Hiroshima, Japan	20 years, 145 days	
76 kg
Snatch	155.5 kg	Wang Hongyu	China	1 June 1997	Junior World Championships	Cape Town, South Africa	18 years, 59 days	
Clean & Jerk	200 kg	World Standard						
Total	350 kg	World Standard						
83 kg
Snatch	162.5 kg	Giorgi Asanidze	Georgia	13 June 1995	European Junior Championships	Beersheba, Israel	19 years, 287 days	
Clean & Jerk	197.5 kg	Svetoslav Nikolov	Bulgaria	13 June 1995	European Junior Championships	Beersheba, Israel	19 years, 269 days	
Total	352.5 kg	Svetoslav Nikolov	Bulgaria	13 June 1995	European Junior Championships	Beersheba, Israel	19 years, 269 days	
91 kg
Snatch	186 kg	Aleksey Petrov	Russia	24 November 1994	World Championships	Istanbul, Turkey	20 years, 77 days	
Clean & Jerk	228 kg	Aleksey Petrov	Russia	24 November 1994	World Championships	Istanbul, Turkey	20 years, 77 days	
Total	412.5 kg	Aleksey Petrov	Russia	7 May 1994	European Championships	Sokolov, Czech Republic	19 years, 241 days	
99 kg
Snatch	180 kg	Evgeny Shishlyannikov	Russia	29 July 1994	Junior World Championships	Jakarta, Indonesia	19 years, 172 days	
Clean & Jerk	217.5 kg	Mario Kalinke	Germany	25 November 1994	World Championships	Istanbul, Turkey	20 years, 322 days	
Total	395 kg	Denys Hotfrid	Ukraine	6 May 1995	European Championships	Warsaw, Poland	20 years, 90 days	
108 kg
Snatch	185 kg	Sergei Lokianchikov	Ukraine	26 November 1994	World Championships	Istanbul, Turkey		
Clean & Jerk	220 kg	Ara Vardanyan	Armenia	8 October 1994	European Junior Championships	Rome, Italy	19 years, 291 days	
Total	400 kg	Sergei Lokianchikov	Ukraine	26 November 1994	World Championships	Istanbul, Turkey		
+108 kg
Snatch	178 kg	Petr Sobotka	Czech Republic	15 June 1995	European Junior Championships	Beersheba, Israel	20 years, 46 days	
Clean & Jerk	218 kg	Pavel Pavlov	Bulgaria	7 May 1995	European Championships	Warsaw, Poland	20 years, 6 days	
Total	395 kg	Ashot Danielyan	Armenia	27 November 1994	World Championships	Istanbul, Turkey	20 years, 230 days	

=== Men (1973–1992) ===
Event	Record	Athlete	Nation	Date	Meet	Place	Age	Ref
52 kg
Snatch	120 kg	Sevdalin Marinov	Bulgaria	18 September 1988	Olympic Games	Seoul, South Korea	20 years, 99 days	
Clean & Jerk	155.5 kg	Ivan Ivanov	Bulgaria	27 September 1991	World Championships	Donaueschingen, Germany	20 years, 31 days	
Total	272.5 kg	Ivan Ivanov	Bulgaria	16 September 1989	World Championships	Athens, Greece	18 years, 20 days	
56 kg
Snatch	132.5 kg	Naim Suleymanov	Bulgaria	12 September 1984	Friendship Games	Varna, Bulgaria	17 years, 233 days	
Clean & Jerk	170.5 kg	Naim Suleymanov	Bulgaria	12 September 1984	Friendship Games	Varna, Bulgaria	17 years, 233 days	
Total	300 kg	Naim Suleymanov	Bulgaria	11 May 1984		Varna, Bulgaria	17 years, 109 days	
60 kg
Snatch	148 kg	Naum Shalamanov	Bulgaria	7 December 1986		Melbourne, Australia	19 years, 318 days	
Clean & Jerk	188 kg	Naum Shalamanov	Bulgaria	9 November 1986	World Championships	Sofia, Bulgaria	19 years, 290 days	
Total	335 kg	Naum Shalamanov	Bulgaria	9 November 1986	World Championships	Sofia, Bulgaria	19 years, 290 days	
67.5 kg
Snatch	158.5 kg	Israel Militosyan	Soviet Union	24 May 1988	Junior World Championships	Athens, Greece	19 years, 281 days	
Clean & Jerk	200 kg	Aleksandar Varbanov	Bulgaria	13 September 1984	Friendship Games	Varna, Bulgaria	20 years, 127 days	
Total	342.5 kg	Israel Militosyan	Soviet Union	24 May 1988	Junior World Championships	Athens, Greece	19 years, 281 days	
75 kg
Snatch	170 kg	Angel Genchev	Bulgaria	11 December 1987		Miskolc, Hungary	20 years, 314 days	
Clean & Jerk	211 kg	Zdravko Stoichkov	Bulgaria	14 September 1984	Friendship Games	Varna, Bulgaria	20 years, 74 days	
Total	377.5 kg	Zdravko Stoichkov	Bulgaria	14 September 1984	Friendship Games	Varna, Bulgaria	20 years, 74 days	
82.5 kg
Snatch	179 kg	Israil Arsamakov	Soviet Union	22 May 1982	USSR Championships	Dnipropetrovsk, Soviet Union	20 years, 103 days	
Clean & Jerk	215 kg	Israil Arsamakov	Soviet Union	13 August 1982	Junior World Championships	São Paulo, Brazil	20 years, 186 days	
Total	385 kg	Israil Arsamakov	Soviet Union	13 August 1982	Junior World Championships	São Paulo, Brazil	20 years, 186 days	
90 kg
Snatch	183.5 kg	Yury Zakharevich	Soviet Union	20 June 1981	Junior World Championships	Lignano Sabbiadoro, Italy	18 years, 153 days	
Clean & Jerk	225 kg	Kakhi Kakhiashvili	Soviet Union	28 May 1989	Junior World Championships	Ft. Lauderdale, United States	19 years, 319 days	
Total	405 kg	Yury Zakharevich	Soviet Union	20 June 1981	Junior World Championships	Lignano Sabbiadoro, Italy	18 years, 153 days	
100 kg
Snatch	200 kg	Yury Zakharevich	Soviet Union	4 March 1983	Friendship Cup	Odesa, Soviet Union	20 years, 45 days	
Clean & Jerk	240 kg	Yury Zakharevich	Soviet Union	4 March 1983	Friendship Cup	Odesa, Soviet Union	20 years, 45 days	
Total	440 kg	Yury Zakharevich	Soviet Union	4 March 1983	Friendship Cup	Odesa, Soviet Union	20 years, 45 days	
110 kg
Snatch	205 kg	Ronny Weller	Germany	29 May 1989	Junior World Championships	Ft. Lauderdale, United States	19 years, 311 days	
Clean & Jerk	250 kg	Stefan Botev	Bulgaria	13 March 1988	Pannonia Cup	Budapest, Hungary	20 years, 28 days	
Total	445 kg	Stefan Botev	Bulgaria	13 March 1988	Pannonia Cup	Budapest, Hungary	20 years, 28 days	
+110 kg
Snatch	191 kg	Andrei Chemerkin	Russia	15 November 1992	European Junior Championships	(United Kingdom) Cardiff, Great Britain	20 years, 272 days	
Clean & Jerk	235 kg	Andrei Chemerkin	Russia	15 November 1992	European Junior Championships	(United Kingdom) Cardiff, Great Britain	20 years, 272 days	
Total	425 kg	Andrei Chemerkin	Russia	15 November 1992	European Junior Championships	(United Kingdom) Cardiff, Great Britain	20 years, 272 days	

=== Women (2025–2026) ===
Event	Record	Athlete	Nation	Date	Meet	Place	Age	Ref
48 kg
Snatch	87 kg	World Standard						
Clean & Jerk	114 kg	World Standard						
Total	201 kg	World Standard						
58 kg
Snatch	101 kg	Wei Tingna	China	13 May 2026	Asian Championships	Gandhinagar, India	19 years, 360 days	
Clean & Jerk	125 kg	World Standard						
Total	225 kg	Wei Tingna	China	13 May 2026	Asian Championships	Gandhinagar, India	19 years, 360 days	
63 kg
Snatch	112 kg	Yang Liuyue	China	14 May 2026	Asian Championships	Gandhinagar, India	19 years, 155 days	
Clean & Jerk	139 kg	Yang Liuyue	China	14 May 2026	Asian Championships	Gandhinagar, India	19 years, 155 days	
Total	251 kg	Yang Liuyue	China	14 May 2026	Asian Championships	Gandhinagar, India	19 years, 155 days	

=== Women (2018–2025) ===
Event	Record	Athlete	Nation	Date	Meet	Place	Age	Ref
–45 kg
Snatch	78 kg	World Standard						
Clean & Jerk	104 kg	Ýulduz Jumabaýewa	Turkmenistan	2 November 2018	World Championships	Ashgabat, Turkmenistan	20 years, 194 days	
Total	179 kg	Ýulduz Jumabaýewa	Turkmenistan	2 November 2018	World Championships	Ashgabat, Turkmenistan	20 years, 194 days	
–49 kg
Snatch	92 kg	Jiang Huihua	China	3 November 2018	World Championships	Ashgabat, Turkmenistan	20 years, 285 days	
Clean & Jerk	120 kg	Xiang Linxiang	China	7 December 2024	World Championships	Manama, Bahrain	20 years, 268 days	
Total	212 kg	Xiang Linxiang	China	7 December 2024	World Championships	Manama, Bahrain	20 years, 268 days	
–55 kg
Snatch	99 kg	Zhang Haiqin	China	10 May 2025	Asian Championships	Jiangshan, China	20 years, 124 days	
Clean & Jerk	126 kg	Zhang Haiqin	China	10 May 2025	Asian Championships	Jiangshan, China	20 years, 124 days	
Total	225 kg	Zhang Haiqin	China	10 May 2025	Asian Championships	Jiangshan, China	20 years, 124 days	
–59 kg
Snatch	111 kg	Kim Il-gyong	North Korea	2 October 2023	Asian Games	Hangzhou, China	20 years, 67 days	
Clean & Jerk	136 kg	Kim Il-gyong	North Korea	8 December 2023	IWF Grand Prix	Doha, Qatar	20 years, 134 days	
Total	246 kg	Kim Il-gyong	North Korea	2 October 2023	Asian Games	Hangzhou, China	20 years, 67 days	
–64 kg
Snatch	114 kg	Ri Suk	North Korea	9 December 2023	IWF Grand Prix	Doha, Qatar	20 years, 269 days	
Clean & Jerk	146 kg	Ri Suk	North Korea	9 December 2023	IWF Grand Prix	Doha, Qatar	20 years, 269 days	
Total	260 kg	Ri Suk	North Korea	9 December 2023	IWF Grand Prix	Doha, Qatar	20 years, 269 days	
–71 kg
Snatch	115 kg	Olivia Reeves	United States	10 December 2023	IWF Grand Prix	Doha, Qatar	20 years, 235 days	
Clean & Jerk	147 kg	Olivia Reeves	United States	10 December 2023	IWF Grand Prix	Doha, Qatar	20 years, 235 days	
Total	262 kg	Olivia Reeves	United States	10 December 2023	IWF Grand Prix	Doha, Qatar	20 years, 235 days	
–76 kg
Snatch	117 kg	Neisi Dájomes	Ecuador	7 November 2018	World Championships	Ashgabat, Turkmenistan	20 years, 179 days	
Clean & Jerk	142 kg	Neisi Dájomes	Ecuador	7 November 2018	World Championships	Ashgabat, Turkmenistan	20 years, 179 days	
Total	259 kg	Neisi Dájomes	Ecuador	7 November 2018	World Championships	Ashgabat, Turkmenistan	20 years, 179 days	
–81 kg
Snatch	118 kg	World Standard						
Clean & Jerk	150 kg	Eileen Cikamatana	Australia	12 December 2019	IWF World Cup	Tianjin, China	20 years, 85 days	
Total	260 kg	Eileen Cikamatana	Australia	12 December 2019	IWF World Cup	Tianjin, China	20 years, 85 days	
–87 kg
Snatch	122 kg	World Standard						
Clean & Jerk	151 kg	Eileen Cikamatana	Australia	10 November 2019	IWF Grand Prix ODESUR CSLP	Lima, Peru	20 years, 53 days	
Total	269 kg	World Standard						
+87 kg
Snatch	149 kg	Li Yan	China	15 December 2024	World Championships	Manama, Bahrain	20 years, 341 days	
Clean & Jerk	186 kg	Li Wenwen	China	27 September 2019	World Championships	Pattaya, Thailand	19 years, 206 days	
Total	332 kg	Li Wenwen	China	27 September 2019	World Championships	Pattaya, Thailand	19 years, 206 days	

=== Women (1998–2018) ===
Event	Record	Athlete	Nation	Date	Meet	Place	Age	Ref
–48 kg
Snatch	95 kg	Wang Mingjuan	China	9 November 2005	World Championships	Doha, Qatar	20 years, 172 days	
Clean & Jerk	118 kg	Wang Mingjuan	China	9 November 2005	World Championships	Doha, Qatar	20 years, 172 days	
Total	213 kg	Wang Mingjuan	China	9 November 2005	World Championships	Doha, Qatar	20 years, 172 days	
–53 kg
Snatch	102 kg	Zhang Wanqiong	China	21 September 2014	Asian Games	Incheon, South Korea	20 years, 243 days	
Clean & Jerk	130 kg	Zulfiya Chinshanlo	Kazakhstan	6 November 2011	World Championships	Paris, France	18 years, 104 days	
Total	228 kg	Zhang Wanqiong	China	21 September 2014	Asian Games	Incheon, South Korea	20 years, 243 days	
–58 kg
Snatch	110 kg	Wang Li	China	10 August 2003	Asian Junior Championships	Bali, Indonesia	17 years, 334 days	
Clean & Jerk	139 kg	Gu Wei	China	11 November 2005	World Championships	Doha, Qatar	19 years, 200 days	
Total	244 kg	Deng Wei	China	7 November 2012	University World Championships	Eilat, Israel	19 years, 267 days	
–63 kg
Snatch	115 kg	Svetlana Tsarukayeva	Russia	23 September 2007	World Championships	Chiang Mai, Thailand	19 years, 272 days	
Clean & Jerk	136 kg	Jo Pok-hyang	North Korea	11 November 2012	Asian Junior Championships	Yangon, Myanmar	19 years, 362 days	
Total	250 kg	Svetlana Tsarukayeva	Russia	23 September 2007	World Championships	Chiang Mai, Thailand	19 years, 272 days	
–69 kg
Snatch	123 kg	Oksana Slivenko	Russia	4 October 2006	World Championships	Santo Domingo, Dominican Republic	19 years, 288 days	
Clean & Jerk	157 kg	Zarema Kasayeva	Russia	13 November 2005	World Championships	Doha, Qatar	18 years, 261 days	
Total	275 kg	Liu Chunhong	China	19 August 2004	Olympic Games	Athens, Greece	19 years, 203 days	
–75 kg
Snatch	130 kg	Natalia Zabolotnaya	Russia	13 November 2005	World Championships	Doha, Qatar	20 years, 90 days	
Clean & Jerk	159 kg	Liu Chunhong	China	13 November 2005	World Championships	Doha, Qatar	20 years, 288 days	
Total	286 kg	Svetlana Podobedova	Russia	2 June 2006	World Junior Championships	Hangzhou, China	20 years, 8 days	
–90 kg
Snatch	125 kg	Tatiana Kashirina	Russia	11 April 2009	European Championships	Bucharest, Romania	18 years, 77 days	
Clean & Jerk	155 kg	Tatiana Kashirina	Russia	11 April 2009	European Championships	Bucharest, Romania	18 years, 77 days	
Total	280 kg	Tatiana Kashirina	Russia	11 April 2009	European Championships	Bucharest, Romania	18 years, 77 days	
+90 kg
Snatch	148 kg	Tatiana Kashirina	Russia	18 December 2011	President's Cup	Belgorod, Russia	20 years, 328 days	
Clean & Jerk	181 kg	Tatiana Kashirina	Russia	17 April 2011	European Championships	Kazan, Russia	20 years, 83 days	
Total	327 kg	Tatiana Kashirina	Russia	17 April 2011	European Championships	Kazan, Russia	20 years, 83 days	

=== Women (1995–1997) ===
Event	Record	Athlete	Nation	Date	Meet	Place	Age	Ref
46 kg
Snatch	77.5 kg	Sri Indriyani	Indonesia	12 October 1997		Jakarta, Indonesia	18 years, 334 days	
Clean & Jerk	98 kg	Sri Indriyani	Indonesia	12 October 1997		Jakarta, Indonesia	18 years, 334 days	
Total	175 kg	Sri Indriyani	Indonesia	12 October 1997		Jakarta, Indonesia	18 years, 334 days	
50 kg
Snatch	85 kg	Zhong Yan	China	7 December 1997	World Championships	Chiang Mai, Thailand		
Clean & Jerk	103 kg	Shao Yongxia	China	21 November 1996		Seoul, South Korea		
Total	182.5 kg	Ri Song-hui	North Korea	5 April 1996	Asian Championships	Yachiyo, Japan	17 years, 124 days	
54 kg
Snatch	93.5 kg	Yang Xia	China	9 July 1997	Asian Championships	Yangzhou, China	20 years, 182 days	
Clean & Jerk	115 kg	Yang Xia	China	9 July 1997	Asian Championships	Yangzhou, China	20 years, 182 days	
Total	207.5 kg	Yang Xia	China	9 July 1997	Asian Championships	Yangzhou, China	20 years, 182 days	
59 kg
Snatch	92.5 kg	Chen Xiaomin	China	20 November 1995	World Championships	Guangzhou, China	18 years, 286 days	
Clean & Jerk	124 kg	Xiu Xiongying	China	6 May 1996	Junior World Championships	Warsaw, Poland		
Total	215 kg	Chen Xiaomin	China	20 November 1995	World Championships	Guangzhou, China	18 years, 286 days	
64 kg
Snatch	107.5 kg	Chen Xiaomin	China	10 July 1997	Asian Championships	Yangzhou, China	20 years, 153 days	
Clean & Jerk	131 kg	Chen Yanqing	China	10 December 1997	World Championships	Chiang Mai, Thailand	18 years, 249 days	
Total	235 kg	Chen Xiaomin	China	10 July 1997	Asian Championships	Yangzhou, China	20 years, 153 days	
70 kg
Snatch	103.5 kg	Gao Shihong	China	13 July 1997	Asian Championships	Yangzhou, China		
Clean & Jerk	129.5 kg	Zhao Nan	China	1 June 1997	Junior World Championships	Cape Town, South Africa		
Total	227.5 kg	Tang Weifang	China	7 April 1996	Asian Championships	Yachiyo, Japan	17 years, 289 days	
76 kg
Snatch	106.5 kg	Gao Xiaoyan	China	24 November 1996		Seoul, South Korea		
Clean & Jerk	122.5 kg	Aysel Özgür	Turkey	28 June 1997	European Championships	Sevilla, Spain	17 years, 26 days	
Total	227.5 kg	Aysel Özgür	Turkey	28 June 1997	European Championships	Sevilla, Spain	17 years, 26 days	
83 kg
Snatch	117.5 kg	Tang Weifang	China	13 December 1997	World Championships	Chiang Mai, Thailand	19 years, 173 days	
Clean & Jerk	143 kg	Tang Weifang	China	13 December 1997	World Championships	Chiang Mai, Thailand	19 years, 173 days	
Total	260 kg	Tang Weifang	China	13 December 1997	World Championships	Chiang Mai, Thailand	19 years, 173 days	
+83 kg
Snatch	112.5 kg	Wang Yanmei	China	14 July 1997	Asian Championships	Yangzhou, China		
Clean & Jerk	140 kg	Wang Yanmei	China	14 July 1997	Asian Championships	Yangzhou, China		
Total	252.5 kg	Wang Yanmei	China	14 July 1997	Asian Championships	Yangzhou, China		
