= 1987 European Weightlifting Championships =

International weightlifting competition

1987 European Championships

The 1987 European Weightlifting Championships were held in Reims, France from May 3 to May 9, 1987. This was the 66th edition of the event. There were 160 men in action.

== Medal summary ==
Event	Gold		Silver		Bronze	
52 kg
Snatch	Sevdalin Marinov; Bulgaria	115.0 kg	Bernard Piekorz; Poland	102.5 kg	Teodor Jakob; Romania	100.0 kg
Clean & Jerk	Sevdalin Marinov; Bulgaria	145.0 kg	Bernard Piekorz; Poland	130.0 kg	Agron Haxhihyseni; Albania	127.5 kg
Total	Sevdalin Marinov; Bulgaria	260.0 kg	Bernard Piekorz; Poland	232.5 kg	Agron Haxhihyseni; Albania	222.5 kg
56 kg
Snatch	Mitko Grablev; Bulgaria	130.0 kg	Arvo Ojalehto; Finland	105.0 kg	Giovanni Scarantino; Italy	105.0 kg
Clean & Jerk	Mitko Grablev; Bulgaria	165.0 kg	Imrich Rusniak; Czechoslovakia	140.0 kg	Arvo Ojalehto; Finland	132.5 kg
Total	Mitko Grablev; Bulgaria	295.0 kg	Imrich Rusniak; Czechoslovakia	245.0 kg	Arvo Ojalehto; Finland	237.5 kg
60 kg
Snatch	Stefan Topurov; Bulgaria	140.0 kg	Attila Czanka; Romania	137.5 kg	Muhady Sedaev; Soviet Union	137.5 kg
Clean & Jerk	Attila Czanka; Romania	170.0 kg	Stefan Topurov; Bulgaria	170.0 kg	Muhady Sedaev; Soviet Union	170.0 kg
Total	Stefan Topurov; Bulgaria	310.0 kg	Attila Czanka; Romania	307.5 kg	Muhady Sedaev; Soviet Union	307.5 kg
67.5 kg
Snatch	Mikhail Petrov; Bulgaria	157.5 kg WR	Israel Militosyan; Soviet Union	150.0 kg	Joachim Kunz; East Germany	147.5 kg
Clean & Jerk	Mikhail Petrov; Bulgaria	190.0 kg	Israel Militosyan; Soviet Union	185.0 kg	Joachim Kunz; East Germany	185.0 kg
Total	Mikhail Petrov; Bulgaria	347.5 kg WR	Israel Militosyan; Soviet Union	335.0 kg	Joachim Kunz; East Germany	332.5 kg
75 kg
Snatch	Andrei Socaci; Romania	165.0 kg	Borislav Gidikov; Bulgaria	165.0 kg	Aleksandar Varbanov; Bulgaria	160.0 kg
Clean & Jerk	Aleksandar Varbanov; Bulgaria	210.0 kg	Andrei Socaci; Romania	202.5 kg	Borislav Gidikov; Bulgaria	202.5 kg
Total	Aleksandar Varbanov; Bulgaria	370.0 kg	Andrei Socaci; Romania	367.5 kg	Borislav Gidikov; Bulgaria	367.5 kg
82.5 kg
Snatch	Asen Zlatev; Bulgaria	177.5 kg	Israil Arsamakov; Soviet Union	170.0 kg	László Barsi; Hungary	167.5 kg
Clean & Jerk	Asen Zlatev; Bulgaria	215.0 kg	Constantin Urdas; Romania	210.0 kg	Petre Becheru; Romania	207.5 kg
Total	Asen Zlatev; Bulgaria	392.5 kg	László Barsi; Hungary	372.5 kg	Petre Becheru; Romania	367.5 kg
90 kg
Snatch	Anatoly Khrapaty; Soviet Union	185.0 kg	Viktor Tregubov; Soviet Union	185.0 kg	Sławomir Zawada; Poland	182.5 kg
Clean & Jerk	Anatoly Khrapaty; Soviet Union	230.0 kg	Rumen Teodosiev; Bulgaria	230.0 kg	Viktor Tregubov; Soviet Union	220.0 kg
Total	Anatoly Khrapaty; Soviet Union	415.0 kg	Rumen Teodosiev; Bulgaria	410.0 kg	Viktor Tregubov; Soviet Union	405.0 kg
100 kg
Snatch	Nicu Vlad; Romania	195.0 kg	Andor Szanyi; Hungary	190.0 kg	Pavel Kuznetsov; Soviet Union	182.5 kg
Clean & Jerk	Andor Szanyi; Hungary	232.5 kg	Pavel Kuznetsov; Soviet Union	227.5 kg	Nicu Vlad; Romania	227.5 kg
Total	Andor Szanyi; Hungary	422.5 kg	Nicu Vlad; Romania	422.5 kg	Pavel Kuznetsov; Soviet Union	410.0 kg
110 kg
Snatch	Yury Zakharevich; Soviet Union	202.5 kg WR	Artur Akoyev; Soviet Union	195.0 kg	Stefan Botev; Bulgaria	187.5 kg
Clean & Jerk	Stefan Botev; Bulgaria	242.5 kg	Yury Zakharevich; Soviet Union	237.5 kg	Artur Akoyev; Soviet Union	235.0 kg
Total	Yury Zakharevich; Soviet Union	440.0 kg	Stefan Botev; Bulgaria	430.0 kg	Artur Akoyev; Soviet Union	430.0 kg
+110 kg
Snatch	Antonio Krastev; Bulgaria	215.5 kg WR	Yevgeny Sypko; Soviet Union	200.0 kg	Istvan Kovacs; Hungary	185.0 kg
Clean & Jerk	Antonio Krastev; Bulgaria	252.5 kg	Yevgeny Sypko; Soviet Union	245.0 kg	Anatoly Pisarenko; Soviet Union	240.0 kg
Total	Antonio Krastev; Bulgaria	467.5 kg WR	Yevgeny Sypko; Soviet Union	445.0 kg	Petr Hudeček; Czechoslovakia	405.0 kg

== Medal table ==
Ranking by Big (Total result) medals

Rank	Nation	Gold	Silver	Bronze	Total
1	Bulgaria (BUL)	7	2	1	10
2	Soviet Union (URS)	2	2	4	8
3	Hungary (HUN)	1	1	0	2
4	Romania (ROU)	0	3	1	4
5	Czechoslovakia (TCH)	0	1	1	2
6	Poland (POL)	0	1	0	1
7	Albania (ALB)	0	0	1	1
7	East Germany (GDR)	0	0	1	1
7	Finland (FIN)	0	0	1	1
Totals (9 entries)		10	10	10	30
