= 1986 European Weightlifting Championships =

International weightlifting competition

1986 European Championships

The 1986 European Weightlifting Championships were held in Karl-Marx-Stadt, East Germany from May 6 to May 11, 1986. This was the 65th edition of the event. There were 127 men in action from 22 nations.

== Medal summary ==
Event	Gold		Silver		Bronze	
52 kg
Snatch	Jacek Gutowski; Poland	110.0 kg	Sevdalin Marinov; Bulgaria	110.0 kg	Teodor Jakob; Romania	107.5 kg
Clean & Jerk	Sevdalin Marinov; Bulgaria	135.0 kg	Jacek Gutowski; Poland	132.5 kg	Bernard Piekorz; Poland	125.0 kg
Total	Sevdalin Marinov; Bulgaria	245.0 kg	Jacek Gutowski; Poland	242.5 kg	Bernard Piekorz; Poland	230.0 kg
56 kg
Snatch	Neno Terziyski; Bulgaria	122.5 kg	Oksen Mirzoyan; Soviet Union	120.0 kg	Mitko Grablev; Bulgaria	117.5 kg
Clean & Jerk	Neno Terziyski; Bulgaria	162.5 kg	Oksen Mirzoyan; Soviet Union	160.0 kg	Mitko Grablev; Bulgaria	157.5 kg
Total	Neno Terziyski; Bulgaria	285.0 kg	Oksen Mirzoyan; Soviet Union	280.0 kg	Mitko Grablev; Bulgaria	275.0 kg
60 kg
Snatch	Naum Shalamanov; Bulgaria	145.5 kg WR	Yurik Sarkisyan; Soviet Union	130.0 kg	Andreas Letz; East Germany	127.5 kg
Clean & Jerk	Naum Shalamanov; Bulgaria	187.5 kg WR	Yurik Sarkisyan; Soviet Union	165.0 kg	Andreas Letz; East Germany	155.0 kg
Total	Naum Shalamanov; Bulgaria	332.5 kg WR	Yurik Sarkisyan; Soviet Union	295.0 kg	Andreas Letz; East Germany	282.5 kg
67.5 kg
Snatch	Andreas Behm; East Germany	152.5 kg	Mikhail Petrov; Bulgaria	152.5 kg	Joachim Kunz; East Germany	142.5 kg
Clean & Jerk	Andreas Behm; East Germany	195.0 kg	Mikhail Petrov; Bulgaria	192.5 kg	Joachim Kunz; East Germany	187.5 kg
Total	Andreas Behm; East Germany	347.5 kg	Mikhail Petrov; Bulgaria	345.0 kg	Joachim Kunz; East Germany	330.0 kg
75 kg
Snatch	Andrei Socaci; Romania	160.0 kg	Aleksandar Varbanov; Bulgaria	160.0 kg	Borislav Gidikov; Bulgaria	157.5 kg
Clean & Jerk	Aleksandar Varbanov; Bulgaria	212.5 kg WR	Borislav Gidikov; Bulgaria	200.0 kg	Andrei Socaci; Romania	190.0 kg
Total	Aleksandar Varbanov; Bulgaria	372.5 kg	Borislav Gidikov; Bulgaria	357.5 kg	Andrei Socaci; Romania	350.0 kg
82.5 kg
Snatch	Israil Arsamakov; Soviet Union	170.0 kg	Asen Zlatev; Bulgaria	167.5 kg	Constantin Urdas; Romania	165.0 kg
Clean & Jerk	Israil Arsamakov; Soviet Union	212.5 kg	Asen Zlatev; Bulgaria	207.5 kg	Constantin Urdas; Romania	205.0 kg
Total	Israil Arsamakov; Soviet Union	382.5 kg	Asen Zlatev; Bulgaria	375.0 kg	Constantin Urdas; Romania	370.0 kg
90 kg
Snatch	Anatoly Khrapaty; Soviet Union	180.0 kg	Zoltan Balazsfi; Hungary	180.0 kg	Viktor Solodov; Soviet Union	175.0 kg
Clean & Jerk	Anatoly Khrapaty; Soviet Union	230.0 kg	Rumen Teodosiev; Bulgaria	220.0 kg	Viktor Solodov; Soviet Union	220.0 kg
Total	Anatoly Khrapaty; Soviet Union	410.0 kg	Viktor Solodov; Soviet Union	395.0 kg	Rumen Teodosiev; Bulgaria	392.5 kg
100 kg
Snatch	Nicu Vlad; Romania	187.5 kg	Aleksandr Popov; Soviet Union	175.0 kg	René Wyßuwa; East Germany	175.0 kg
Clean & Jerk	Nicu Vlad; Romania	230.0 kg	Aleksandr Popov; Soviet Union	222.5 kg	Janos Bökfi; Hungary	210.0 kg
Total	Nicu Vlad; Romania	417.5 kg	Aleksandr Popov; Soviet Union	397.5 kg	René Wyßuwa; East Germany	385.0 kg
110 kg
Snatch	Yury Zakharevich; Soviet Union	195.0 kg	Sergey Nagirny; Soviet Union	185.0 kg	Norberto Oberburger; Italy	180.0 kg
Clean & Jerk	Yury Zakharevich; Soviet Union	235.0 kg	Sergey Nagirny; Soviet Union	225.0 kg	Norberto Oberburger; Italy	220.0 kg
Total	Yury Zakharevich; Soviet Union	430.0 kg	Sergey Nagirny; Soviet Union	410.0 kg	Norberto Oberburger; Italy	400.0 kg
+110 kg
Snatch	Antonio Krastev; Bulgaria	207.5 kg	Leonid Taranenko; Soviet Union	195.0 kg	Senno Salzwedel; East Germany	185.0 kg
Clean & Jerk	Leonid Taranenko; Soviet Union	242.5 kg	Antonio Krastev; Bulgaria	242.5 kg	Senno Salzwedel; East Germany	235.0 kg
Total	Antonio Krastev; Bulgaria	450.0 kg	Leonid Taranenko; Soviet Union	437.5 kg	Senno Salzwedel; East Germany	420.0 kg

== Medal table ==
Ranking by Big (Total result) medals

Rank	Nation	Gold	Silver	Bronze	Total
1	Bulgaria (BUL)	5	3	2	10
2	Soviet Union (URS)	3	6	0	9
3	East Germany (GDR)	1	0	4	5
4	Romania (ROU)	1	0	2	3
5	Poland (POL)	0	1	1	2
6	Italy (ITA)	0	0	1	1
Totals (6 entries)		10	10	10	30
