= 1986 World Weightlifting Championships =

International weightlifting competition

- Host city: Sofia, Bulgaria
- Dates: 8–15 November 1986

The 1986 Men's World Weightlifting Championships were held in Sofia, Bulgaria from November 8 to November 15, 1986. There were 193 men in action from 41 nations.

== Medal summary ==
Event	Gold		Silver		Bronze	
52 kg
Snatch	Jacek Gutowski; Poland	115.0 kg	He Zhuoqiang; China	112.5 kg	Lyu Jun-sik; North Korea	112.5 kg
Clean & Jerk	Sevdalin Marinov; Bulgaria	145.0 kg	Aleksey Kolokoltsev; Soviet Union	140.0 kg	Jacek Gutowski; Poland	137.5 kg
Total	Sevdalin Marinov; Bulgaria	257.5 kg	Jacek Gutowski; Poland	252.5 kg	Aleksey Kolokoltsev; Soviet Union	250.0 kg
56 kg
Snatch	He Yingqiang; China	127.5 kg	Mitko Grablev; Bulgaria	127.5 kg	Lai Runming; China	127.5 kg
Clean & Jerk	Mitko Grablev; Bulgaria	162.5 kg	Oksen Mirzoyan; Soviet Union	160.0 kg	He Yingqiang; China	160.0 kg
Total	Mitko Grablev; Bulgaria	290.0 kg	He Yingqiang; China	287.5 kg	Oksen Mirzoyan; Soviet Union	285.0 kg
60 kg
Snatch	Naum Shalamanov; Bulgaria	147.5 kg WR	Attila Czanka; Romania	130.0 kg	Ye Huanming; China	127.5 kg
Clean & Jerk	Naum Shalamanov; Bulgaria	188.0 kg WR	Andreas Letz; East Germany	160.0 kg	Kim Yong-su; North Korea	160.0 kg
Total	Naum Shalamanov; Bulgaria	335.0 kg WR	Attila Czanka; Romania	290.0 kg	Andreas Letz; East Germany	285.0 kg
67.5 kg
Snatch	Mikhail Petrov; Bulgaria	155.0 kg	Stefan Topurov; Bulgaria	152.5 kg	Andreas Behm; East Germany	150.0 kg
Clean & Jerk	Mikhail Petrov; Bulgaria	187.5 kg	Stefan Topurov; Bulgaria	185.0 kg	Xiao Minglin; China	180.0 kg
Total	Mikhail Petrov; Bulgaria	342.5 kg	Stefan Topurov; Bulgaria	337.5 kg	Marek Seweryn; Poland	322.5 kg
75 kg
Snatch	Borislav Gidikov; Bulgaria	168.5 kg WR	Aleksandar Varbanov; Bulgaria	165.0 kg	Andrei Socaci; Romania	157.5 kg
Clean & Jerk	Aleksandar Varbanov; Bulgaria	212.5 kg	Borislav Gidikov; Bulgaria	205.0 kg	Andrei Socaci; Romania	192.5 kg
Total	Aleksandar Varbanov; Bulgaria	377.5 kg WR	Borislav Gidikov; Bulgaria	372.5 kg	Andrei Socaci; Romania	350.0 kg
82.5 kg
Snatch	Asen Zlatev; Bulgaria	180.0 kg	Israil Arsamakov; Soviet Union	177.5 kg	László Barsi; Hungary	175.0 kg
Clean & Jerk	Asen Zlatev; Bulgaria	225.0 kg WR	Enrique Sabari; Cuba	215.0 kg	Zdravko Stoichkov; Bulgaria	212.5 kg
Clean & Jerk	Asen Zlatev; Bulgaria	225.0 kg WR	Enrique Sabari; Cuba	215.0 kg	Israil Arsamakov; Soviet Union	212.5 kg
Total	Asen Zlatev; Bulgaria	405.0 kg	Israil Arsamakov; Soviet Union	390.0 kg	László Barsi; Hungary	385.0 kg
90 kg
Snatch	Anatoly Khrapaty; Soviet Union	185.0 kg	Zoltán Balázsfi; Hungary	185.0 kg	Viktor Solodov; Soviet Union	180.0 kg
Clean & Jerk	Anatoly Khrapaty; Soviet Union	227.5 kg	Viktor Solodov; Soviet Union	227.5 kg	Sławomir Zawada; Poland	210.0 kg
Total	Anatoly Khrapaty; Soviet Union	412.5 kg	Viktor Solodov; Soviet Union	407.5 kg	Zoltán Balázsfi; Hungary	392.5 kg
100 kg
Snatch	Nicu Vlad; Romania	200.5 kg WR	Boris Seregin; Soviet Union	192.5 kg	Andor Szanyi; Hungary	187.5 kg
Clean & Jerk	Nicu Vlad; Romania	237.5 kg	Boris Seregin; Soviet Union	237.5 kg	Andor Szanyi; Hungary	225.0 kg
Total	Nicu Vlad; Romania	437.5 kg	Boris Seregin; Soviet Union	430.0 kg	Andor Szanyi; Hungary	412.5 kg
110 kg
Snatch	Yury Zakharevich; Soviet Union	201.0 kg WR	Sergey Nagirny; Soviet Union	192.5 kg	József Jacsó; Hungary	182.5 kg
Clean & Jerk	Yury Zakharevich; Soviet Union	248.0 kg WR	Sergey Nagirny; Soviet Union	235.0 kg	József Jacsó; Hungary	232.5 kg
Total	Yury Zakharevich; Soviet Union	447.5 kg WR	Sergey Nagirny; Soviet Union	427.5 kg	József Jacsó; Hungary	415.0 kg
+110 kg
Snatch	Antonio Krastev; Bulgaria	215.0 kg WR	Leonid Taranenko; Soviet Union	200.0 kg	Robert Skolimowski; Poland	187.5 kg
Clean & Jerk	Manfred Nerlinger; West Germany	245.0 kg	Antonio Krastev; Bulgaria	245.0 kg	Robert Skolimowski; Poland	222.5 kg
Total	Antonio Krastev; Bulgaria	460.0 kg	Manfred Nerlinger; West Germany	430.0 kg	Robert Skolimowski; Poland	410.0 kg

== Medal table ==
Ranking by Big (Total result) medals

Rank	Nation	Gold	Silver	Bronze	Total
1	Bulgaria	7	2	0	9
2	Soviet Union	2	4	2	8
3	Romania	1	1	1	3
4	Poland	0	1	2	3
5	China	0	1	0	1
5	West Germany	0	1	0	1
7	Hungary	0	0	4	4
8	East Germany	0	0	1	1
Totals (8 entries)		10	10	10	30

Ranking by all medals: Big (Total result) and Small (Snatch and Clean & Jerk)

Rank	Nation	Gold	Silver	Bronze	Total
1	Bulgaria	18	8	1	27
2	Soviet Union	6	13	4	23
3	Romania	3	2	3	8
4	China	1	2	4	7
5	Poland	1	1	6	8
6	West Germany	1	1	0	2
7	Hungary	0	1	9	10
8	East Germany	0	1	2	3
9	Cuba	0	1	0	1
10	North Korea	0	0	2	2
Totals (10 entries)		30	30	31	91
