= Petr Hudeček =

Czech weightlifter (born 1965)

Personal information
- Nationality: Czechs
- Born: 30 August 1965 (age 61) Sokolov, Czechoslovakia
- Height: 1.87 m (6 ft 2 in)
- Weight: 130 kg (290 lb)

Sport
- Sport: Weightlifting
- Event: +110 kg
Medal record
Representing Czechoslovakia
Men's weightlifting
European Championships
| Bronze medal – third place | 1987 Reims | +110 kg |
- Updated on 30 November 2018

Petr Hudeček (born 30 August 1965) is a Czech weightlifter. He competed for Czechoslovakia. He participated at the Olympic Games in 1988, where he placed fifth in the men's super heavyweight category.

== Major results ==
| Year | Venue | Weight | Snatch (kg) | | | | | Clean & Jerk (kg) | | | | | Total | Rank |
| Year | Venue | Weight | 1 | 2 | 3 | Result | Rank | 1 | 2 | 3 | Result | Rank | Total | Rank |
Representing Czechoslovakia
Olympic Games
| 1988 | Seoul, South Korea | +110 kg | 175.0 | ~~180.0~~ | ~~180.0~~ | 175.0 | 5 | 210.0 | 217.5 | 225.0 | 225.0 | 5 | 400.0 | 5 |
World Championships
| 1991 | Donaueschingen, Germany | +110 kg | ~~160.0~~ | 167.5 | ~~172.5~~ | 167.5 | 9 | 202.5 | 207.5 | 215.0 | 215.0 | 7 | 382.5 | 7 |
| 1989 | Athens, Greece | +110 kg | 165.0 | 170.0 | 172.5 | 172.5 | 6 | 207.5 | 212.5 | 217.5 | 217.5 | 6 | 390.0 | 6 |
| 1987 | Ostrava, Czechoslovakia | +110 kg | —N/a | —N/a | —N/a | 180.0 | 9 | —N/a | —N/a | —N/a | 220.0 | 8 | 400.0 | 8 |
| 1986 | Sofia, Bulgaria | +110 kg | —N/a | —N/a | —N/a | 180.0 | 5 | —N/a | —N/a | —N/a | 220.0 | 4 | 400.0 | 4 |
European Championships
| 1992 | Szekszárd, Hungary | +110 kg | —N/a | —N/a | —N/a | 157.5 | 9 | —N/a | —N/a | —N/a | — | — | — | — |
| 1991 | Władysławowo, Poland | +110 kg | —N/a | —N/a | —N/a | 172.5 | 7 | —N/a | —N/a | —N/a | 212.5 | 8 | 385.0 | 7 |
| 1990 | Aalborg, Denmark | +110 kg | —N/a | —N/a | —N/a | 167.5 | 8 | —N/a | —N/a | —N/a | 210.0 | 8 | 377.5 | 8 |
| 1989 | Athens, Greece | +110 kg | 165.0 | 170.0 | 172.5 | 172.5 | 6 | 207.5 | 212.5 | 217.5 | 217.5 | 6 | 390.0 | 6 |
| 1987 | Reims, France | +110 kg | —N/a | —N/a | —N/a | 182.5 | 4 | —N/a | —N/a | —N/a | 222.5 | 4 | 405.0 | 3rd place, bronze medalist(s) |
