= 1988 European Weightlifting Championships =

1988 sporting competition

1988 European Championships

The 1988 European Weightlifting Championships were held in Cardiff, United Kingdom from 26 April to 3 May 1988. This was the 67th edition of the event. There were 175 men in action from 25 nations. The women competition were held in City of San Marino, San Marino. It was the 1st event for the women.

== Medal summary ==
=== Men ===
Event	Gold		Silver		Bronze	
52 kg
Snatch	Sevdalin Marinov; Bulgaria	115.0 kg	Traian Cihărean; Romania	110.0 kg	Bela Olah; Hungary	105.0 kg
Clean & Jerk	Sevdalin Marinov; Bulgaria	145.0 kg	Traian Cihărean; Romania	140.0 kg	Bela Olah; Hungary	127.5 kg
Total	Sevdalin Marinov; Bulgaria	260.0 kg	Traian Cihărean; Romania	250.0 kg	Bela Olah; Hungary	232.5 kg
56 kg
Snatch	Mitko Grablev; Bulgaria	120.0 kg	Neno Terziyski; Bulgaria	120.0 kg	Dimitru Negreanu; Romania	115.0 kg
Clean & Jerk	Mitko Grablev; Bulgaria	167.5 kg	Neno Terziyski; Bulgaria	167.5 kg	Andreas Letz; East Germany	145.0 kg
Total	Mitko Grablev; Bulgaria	287.5 kg	Neno Terziyski; Bulgaria	287.5 kg	Dimitru Negreanu; Romania	257.5 kg
60 kg
Snatch	Naim Süleymanoğlu; Turkey	150.0 kg WR	Stefan Topurov; Bulgaria	145.0 kg	Attila Czanka; Romania	140.0 kg
Clean & Jerk	Naim Süleymanoğlu; Turkey	180.0 kg	Stefan Topurov; Bulgaria	177.5 kg	Attila Czanka; Romania	175.0 kg
Total	Naim Süleymanoğlu; Turkey	330.0 kg	Stefan Topurov; Bulgaria	322.5 kg	Attila Czanka; Romania	315.0 kg
67.5 kg
Snatch	Valery Yurov; Soviet Union	147.5 kg	Joachim Kunz; East Germany	142.5 kg	Bogdan Bakula; Poland	137.5 kg
Clean & Jerk	Valery Yurov; Soviet Union	180.0 kg	Joachim Kunz; East Germany	177.5 kg	Reijo Kiiskilä; Finland	165.0 kg
Total	Valery Yurov; Soviet Union	327.5 kg	Joachim Kunz; East Germany	320.0 kg	Bogdan Bakula; Poland	302.5 kg
75 kg
Snatch	Angel Genchev; Bulgaria	162.5 kg	Andrei Socaci; Romania	160.0 kg	Waldemar Kosiński; Poland	157.5 kg
Clean & Jerk	Angel Genchev; Bulgaria	210.0 kg	Andrei Socaci; Romania	190.0 kg	Waldemar Kosiński; Poland	185.0 kg
Total	Angel Genchev; Bulgaria	372.5 kg	Andrei Socaci; Romania	350.0 kg	Waldemar Kosiński; Poland	342.5 kg
82.5 kg
Snatch	Sergey Li; Soviet Union	175.0 kg	Constantin Urdas; Romania	172.5 kg	Alexander Gusakov; Soviet Union	170.0 kg
Clean & Jerk	Constantin Urdas; Romania	215.0 kg	Sergey Li; Soviet Union	210.0 kg	Alexander Gusakov; Soviet Union	205.0 kg
Total	Constantin Urdas; Romania	387.5 kg	Sergey Li; Soviet Union	385.0 kg	Alexander Gusakov; Soviet Union	375.0 kg
90 kg
Snatch	Ivan Chakarov; Bulgaria	187.5 kg	Anatoly Khrapaty; Soviet Union	185.0 kg	Rumen Teodosiev; Bulgaria	180.0 kg
Clean & Jerk	Anatoly Khrapaty; Soviet Union	235.0 kg WR	Ivan Chakarov; Bulgaria	230.0 kg	Rumen Teodosiev; Bulgaria	220.0 kg
Total	Anatoly Khrapaty; Soviet Union	420.0 kg	Ivan Chakarov; Bulgaria	417.5 kg	Rumen Teodosiev; Bulgaria	400.0 kg
100 kg
Snatch	Andor Szanyi; Hungary	185.0 kg	Aleksandr Popov; Soviet Union	185.0 kg	Detelin Petrov; Bulgaria	185.0 kg
Clean & Jerk	Detelin Petrov; Bulgaria	240.0 kg	Aleksandr Popov; Soviet Union	237.5 kg	Andor Szanyi; Hungary	235.0 kg
Total	Detelin Petrov; Bulgaria	425.0 kg	Aleksandr Popov; Soviet Union	422.5 kg	Andor Szanyi; Hungary	420.0 kg
110 kg
Snatch	Yury Zakharevich; Soviet Union	203.5 kg WR	Norberto Oberburger; Italy	195.0 kg	Ronny Weller; East Germany	192.5 kg
Clean & Jerk	Yury Zakharevich; Soviet Union	250.5 kg WR	Stefan Botev; Bulgaria	247.5 kg	Ronny Weller; East Germany	242.5 kg
Total	Yury Zakharevich; Soviet Union	452.5 kg WR	Stefan Botev; Bulgaria	437.5 kg	Ronny Weller; East Germany	435.0 kg
+110 kg
Snatch	Aleksander Levandovski; Soviet Union	210.0 kg	Leonid Taranenko; Soviet Union	207.5 kg	Antonio Krastev; Bulgaria	202.5 kg
Clean & Jerk	Manfred Nerlinger; West Germany	257.5 kg	Leonid Taranenko; Soviet Union	255.0 kg	Antonio Krastev; Bulgaria	245.0 kg
Total	Leonid Taranenko; Soviet Union	462.5 kg	Antonio Krastev; Bulgaria	447.5 kg	Manfred Nerlinger; West Germany	442.5 kg

=== Women ===
See Mistrzostwa Europy Kobiet w Podnoszeniu Ciężarów 1988 on Polish Wikipedia.

== Medal table ==
Ranking by Big (Total result) medals

Rank	Nation	Gold	Silver	Bronze	Total
1	Bulgaria (BUL)	4	5	1	10
2	Soviet Union (URS)	4	2	1	7
3	Romania (ROU)	1	2	2	5
4	Turkey (TUR)	1	0	0	1
5	East Germany (GDR)	0	1	1	2
6	Hungary (HUN)	0	0	2	2
6	Poland (POL)	0	0	2	2
8	West Germany (FRG)	0	0	1	1
Totals (8 entries)		10	10	10	30
