= Stefan Topurov =

Bulgarian weightlifter (born 1964)

Personal information
- Nationality: Bulgaria
- Born: 11 August 1964 (age 61)
- Height: 1.52 m (5 ft 0 in)
- Weight: 66 kg (146 lb)

Sport
- Country: Bulgaria
- Sport: Olympic weightlifting
- Event(s): 60 kg (1983–1988), 67.5 kg (1986)
Medal record
Men's Olympic weightlifting
Olympic Games
Silver medal – second place	1988 Seoul	-60 kg
World Championships
Gold medal – first place	1987 Ostrava	-60 kg
Silver medal – second place	1983 Moscow	-60 kg
Silver medal – second place	1986 Sofia	-67.5 kg
European Championships
Gold medal – first place	1984 Vittorio	-60 kg
Gold medal – first place	1987 Reims	-60 kg
Silver medal – second place	1983 Moscow	-60 kg
Silver medal – second place	1988 Cardiff	-60 kg
Friendship Games
Gold medal – first place	1984 Varna	-60 kg
Australia Games
Gold medal – first place	1985 Melbourne	-67,5 kg
Pannonia World Cup
Gold medal – first place	1985 Zalaegerszeg	-67,5 kg
World Cup Blue Swords
Silver medal – second place	1986 Meissen	-67,5 kg
Rekord-Meeting
Gold medal – first place	1983 Langbathsee	-67,5 kg
Junior World Championships
Gold medal – first place	1982 Sao Paulo	-60 kg
European Junior Championships
Gold medal – first place	1982 Haskovo	-60 kg
Gold medal – first place	1983 San Marino	-60 kg

Stefan Petrov Topurov (Bulgarian: Стефан Петров Топуров; born 11 August 1964) is a Bulgarian former Olympic weightlifter.

He was the first lifter to clean & jerk 3 times his body weight, with a 180 kg lift in the 60 kg division at the 1983 World Weightlifting Championships.

== Career ==
His only Olympic appearance was at the 1988 Seoul Olympics in the 60 kg division against his former teammate Naim Süleymanoğlu. In the end Naim would put on the most dominating display of weightlifting of all time, but Stefan had a dominating performance of his own, winning the silver medal with a total of 312.5 kg, a full 25.0 kg above the bronze medalist Ye Huanming.

== Major results ==
Year	Venue	Weight	Snatch (kg)				Clean & Jerk (kg)				Total	Rank
Year	Venue	Weight	1	2	3	Rank	1	2	3	Rank	Total	Rank
Olympic Games
1988	Seoul, South Korea	60 kg	137.5	~~142.5~~	~~142.5~~	2	165.0	175.0	--	2	312.5	2nd place, silver medalist(s)
World Championships
1983	Moscow, Soviet Union	60 kg	132.5	--	--	3rd place, bronze medalist(s)	180.0 WR	--	--	1st place, gold medalist(s)	312.5	2nd place, silver medalist(s)
1986	Sofia, Bulgaria	67.5 kg	152.5	--	--	2nd place, silver medalist(s)	185.0	--	--	2nd place, silver medalist(s)	337.5	2nd place, silver medalist(s)
1987	Ostrava, Czechoslovakia	60 kg	135.0	140.0	~~142.5~~	1st place, gold medalist(s)	170.0	~~175.0~~	175.0	1st place, gold medalist(s)	315.0	1st place, gold medalist(s)
European Championships
1984	Vitoria, Spain	60 kg	137.5	--	--	2nd place, silver medalist(s)	177.5	--	--	1st place, gold medalist(s)	315.0 WR	1st place, gold medalist(s)
1987	Reims, France	60 kg	140.0	--	--	1st place, gold medalist(s)	170.0	--	--	2nd place, silver medalist(s)	310.0	1st place, gold medalist(s)
1988	Cardiff, United Kingdom	60 kg	145.0	--	--	2nd place, silver medalist(s)	177.5	--	--	2nd place, silver medalist(s)	322.5	2nd place, silver medalist(s)

== Weightlifting achievements ==
- Silver medalist in Olympic Games (1988);
- Senior world champion (1987);
- Silver medalist in Senior World Championships (1983 and 1986);
- Senior European champion (1984 and 1987);
- Silver medalist at Senior European Championships (1983 and 1988);
- Set eleven world records during his career.
- First man ever to lift three times his body weight.

== Notes ==
1.The 1983 World Championships in Moscow was also the European Championships
