= Aleksandr Popov (weightlifter) =

Soviet weightlifter (born 1959)

Personal information
- Born: 17 November 1959 (age 66) Krasnoyarsk, Russian SFSR, Soviet Union
- Weight: 100 to 108 kg (220 to 238 lb)
Medal record
Men's Weightlifting
Representing Soviet Union
World Championships
Silver medal – second place	1983 Moscow	–100 kg
European Championships
Silver medal – second place	1983 Moscow	–100 kg
Silver medal – second place	1986 Karl-Marx-Stadt	–100 kg
Silver medal – second place	1988 Cardiff	–100 kg
Representing Russia
European Championships
Bronze medal – third place	1993 Sofia	–108 kg

Aleksandr Popov (Russian: Александр Попов; born 17 November 1959) is a Soviet and Russian weightlifter who competed in the 1980s and 1990s. He won several World and European medals.

In 1988, Popov set the clean and jerk world record of 242.5 kg in the 100 kg weight class. That same year, he took part in the Seoul Olympics, but had to compete in the heavier (110 kg) category and finished fifth.
