= Antonio Krastev =

Bulgarian weightlifter (1961–2020)

Personal information
- Born: 10 October 1961 (age 64) Haskovo, Bulgaria
- Died: July 9, 2020 (aged 58) Minnesota, United States
- Weight: +110 kg (243 lb)

Sport
- Sport: Weightlifting
Medal record
Men's weightlifting
Representing Bulgaria
World Championships
Silver medal – second place	1982 Ljubljana	+110 kg
Bronze medal – third place	1983 Moscow	+110 kg
Gold medal – first place	1985 Södertälje	+110 kg
Gold medal – first place	1986 Sofia	+110 kg
Bronze medal – third place	1987 Ostrava	+110 kg
European Championships
Silver medal – second place	1982 Ljubljana	+110 kg
Bronze medal – third place	1983 Moscow	+110 kg
Silver medal – second place	1984 Vitoria	+110 kg
Gold medal – first place	1986 Karl-Marx-Stadt	+110 kg
Gold medal – first place	1987 Reims	+110 kg
Silver medal – second place	1988 Cardiff	+110 kg
IWF World Cup Final
Silver medal – second place	1986 Melbourne	+110 kg
IWF World Cup
Gold medal – first place	1983 Varna	+110 kg
Gold medal – first place	1984 Budapest	+110 kg
Gold medal – first place	1986 Dobrich	+110 kg
Gold medal – first place	1987 Budapest	+110 kg
Gold medal – first place	1987 Pazardzhik	+110 kg
Gold medal – first place	1988 Plovdiv	+110 kg
Junior World Championships
Silver medal – second place	1979 Debrecen	+110 kg
Gold medal – first place	1981 Lignano Sabbiadoro	+110 kg
Junior European Championships
Gold medal – first place	1979 Debrecen	+110 kg
Gold medal – first place	1981 Lignano Sabbiadoro	+110 kg
Balkan Championships
Gold medal – first place	1982 Ankara	+110 kg
Gold medal – first place	1986 Plovdiv	+110 kg
Silver medal – second place	1978 Athens	+110 kg
Moomba International
Gold medal – first place	1986 Melbourne	+110 kg
Rekord-Meeting
Gold medal – first place	1983 Langbathsee	+110 kg
Danube Cup
Gold medal – first place	1987 Budapest	+110 kg
Friendship Cup
Silver medal – second place	1985 Erevan	+110 kg
Bulgarian Championships
Gold medal – first place	1982 Varna	+110 kg
Gold medal – first place	1983 Varna	+110 kg
Gold medal – first place	1984 Varna	+110 kg
Gold medal – first place	1986 Kardzhali	+110 kg
Gold medal – first place	1987 Yambol	+110 kg
Silver medal – second place	1980 Sliven	+110 kg
Bulgaria Team Championships
Gold medal – first place	1981 Kardzhali	+110 kg
Gold medal – first place	1982 Pleven	+110 kg
Silver medal – second place	1985 Kardzhali	+110 kg
Bulgarian Junior&Youth Championships
Gold medal – first place	1981 Vidin	+110 kg
Gold medal – first place	1980 Plovdiv	+110 kg
Gold medal – first place	1979 Sliven	+110 kg
Gold medal – first place	1978 Haskovo	+110 kg
Gold medal – first place	1977 Targovishte	+110 kg
Silver medal – second place	1976 Knezha	100 kg

Antonio Krastev (Bulgarian: Антонио Кръстев, 10 October 1961 – 9 July 2020) was a Bulgarian super heavyweight Olympic-style weightlifter best known for his 1987 heaviest ever snatch in IWF competition, at 216 kg. This was only equalled by Behdad Salimi of Iran at the 2016 Summer Olympics, and finally surpassed at the 2017 European Championships by Lasha Talakhadze, who now holds the record of 225 kg. Krastev's record was no longer official after the restructuring of the weight classes in 1993 and 1998.

Krastev was a junior prodigy in weightlifting and is a two-time world (1985, 1986) and European champion (1986, 1987). He was also world junior champion in 1981 and runner-up in 1979. Antonio has six gold medals from World Cup tournaments and has a silver medal from the 1986 World Cup final in Melbourne. The Bulgarian giant is also a two-time Balkan champion and a ten-time Bulgarian champion - five for men and five for juniors. In 1987, he won the Golden Boot award for best performance at the European Championships in Reims, France.

== Life ==
Krastev was born in Haskovo and was a two-time World Weightlifting Championships gold medalist and two time European Weightlifting Championships gold medalist, but never competed in the Olympic Games; he was originally intended to represent Bulgaria at the 1988 Olympic Games in the superheavyweight category.

Two of his teammates tested positive for Furosemide and the Bulgarian weightlifting federation pulled the rest of the team out of the competition the day before Krastev was scheduled to compete. At the time, Krastev was a two-time World champion and two-time European champion, and a heavy favorite for the gold medal.

Antonio Krastev later retired from weightlifting in Bulgaria, and moved to New York City, where he found employment as a nightclub bouncer. He began training, as his own coach, at the Lost Battalion Hall weightlifting gym, and he developed his strength to an internationally competitive level. Krastev applied for U.S. citizenship in order to compete as an American at the 1992 Olympic Games in Barcelona, but his application was denied, and he was thus unable to compete. Krastev eventually did obtain his American citizenship and resided in New York State.

He died at the age of 58 in a car accident on the night of July 9, 2020, in Minnesota.

== Major results ==
Year	Venue	Weight	Snatch (kg)				Clean & Jerk (kg)				Total	Rank
Year	Venue	Weight	1	2	3	Rank	1	2	3	Rank	Total	Rank
World Championships
1981	Lille, France	+110 kg	185			3rd place, bronze medalist(s)	--			--	--	--
1982	(Socialist Federal Republic of Yugoslavia) Ljubljana, SFR Yugoslavia	+110 kg	200			1st place, gold medalist(s)	242.5			2nd place, silver medalist(s)	442.5	2nd place, silver medalist(s)
1983	Moscow, Soviet Union	+110 kg	190			5	237.5			3rd place, bronze medalist(s)	427.5	3rd place, bronze medalist(s)
1985	Södertälje, Sweden	+110 kg	202.5			1st place, gold medalist(s)	235			4	437.5	1st place, gold medalist(s)
1986	Sofia, Bulgaria	+110 kg	215			1st place, gold medalist(s)	245			2nd place, silver medalist(s)	460	1st place, gold medalist(s)
1987	Ostrava, Czechoslovakia	+110 kg	216			1st place, gold medalist(s)	245			4	460	3rd place, bronze medalist(s)

== World records ==
- 15 November 1986 Snatch - 212.5 kg Super Heavyweight Sofia
- 15 November 1986 Snatch - 215 kg Super Heavyweight Sofia
- 9 May 1987 Snatch - 215.5 kg Super Heavyweight Reims
- 9 May 1987 Total - 467.5 kg Super Heavyweight Reims
- 13 September 1987 Snatch - 216 kg Super Heavyweight Ostrava
