= Weightlifting at the 1988 Summer Olympics =

Weightlifting at the Games of the XXIV Olympiad
- Venue: Olympic Weightlifting Gymnasium
- Dates: 18–29 September 1988
- Competitors: 226 from 62 nations

The weightlifting competition at the 1988 Summer Olympics in Seoul consisted of ten weight classes, all for men only.

== Medal summary ==
Games	Gold	Silver	Bronze
52 kg	Sevdalin Marinov; Bulgaria	Chun Byung-Kwan; South Korea	He Zhuoqiang; China
56 kg	Oksen Mirzoyan; Soviet Union ^{1}	He Yingqiang; China	Liu Shoubin; China
60 kg	Naim Süleymanoğlu; Turkey	Stefan Topurov; Bulgaria	Ye Huanming; China
67.5 kg	Joachim Kunz; East Germany ^{2}	Israel Militosyan; Soviet Union	Li Jinhe; China
75 kg	Borislav Gidikov; Bulgaria	Ingo Steinhöfel; East Germany	Aleksandar Varbanov; Bulgaria
82.5 kg	Israil Arsamakov; Soviet Union	István Messzi; Hungary	Lee Hyung-kun; South Korea
90 kg	Anatoly Khrapaty; Soviet Union	Nail Mukhamedyarov; Soviet Union	Sławomir Zawada; Poland
100 kg	Pavel Kuznetsov; Soviet Union	Nicu Vlad; Romania ^{3}	Peter Immesberger; West Germany
110 kg	Yury Zakharevich; Soviet Union	József Jacsó; Hungary	Ronny Weller; East Germany
+110 kg	Aleksandr Kurlovich; Soviet Union	Manfred Nerlinger; West Germany	Martin Zawieja; West Germany

^{1} Mitko Grablev of Bulgaria originally won the gold medal, but he was disqualified after he tested positive for furosemide.
^{2} Angel Guenchev of Bulgaria originally won the gold medal, but he was disqualified after he tested positive for furosemide.
^{3} Andor Szanyi of Hungary originally won the silver medal, but was disqualified after he tested positive for stanozolol.

== Medal table ==
Rank	Nation	Gold	Silver	Bronze	Total
1	Soviet Union	6	2	0	8
2	Bulgaria	2	1	1	4
3	East Germany	1	1	1	3
4	Turkey	1	0	0	1
5	Hungary	0	2	0	2
6	China	0	1	4	5
7	West Germany	0	1	2	3
8	South Korea	0	1	1	2
9	Romania	0	1	0	1
10	Poland	0	0	1	1
Totals (10 entries)		10	10	10	30

== Sources ==
- "Olympic Medal Winners". International Olympic Committee.
