= Catur Mei Studi =

Indonesian weightlifter (born 1968)

Personal information
- Nationality: Indonesian
- Born: 1 May 1968 (age 56)

Sport
- Sport: Weightlifting

Catur Mei Studi (born 1 May 1968) is an Indonesian weightlifter. He competed in the men's featherweight event at the 1988 Summer Olympics.
