= Weightlifting at the 1988 Summer Olympics – Men's 60 kg =

Weightlifting at the Olympics

Men's 60 kg at the Games of the XXIV Olympiad
- Venue: Olympic Weightlifting Gymnasium
- Date: 20 September 1988
- Competitors: 17 from 14 nations

Medalists
1st place, gold medalist(s)		Naim Süleymanoğlu	Turkey
2nd place, silver medalist(s)		Stefan Topurov	Bulgaria
3rd place, bronze medalist(s)		Ye Huanming	China

The men's 60 kg weightlifting event was one of the events at the weightlifting competition of the 1988 Summer Olympics, limiting competitors to a maximum of 60 kilograms of body mass. The competition took place on 20 September, and participants were divided in two groups.

Each lifter performed in both the snatch and clean and jerk lifts, with the final score being the sum of the lifter's best result in each. The athlete received three attempts in each of the two lifts; the score for the lift was the heaviest weight successfully lifted.

Naim Süleymanoğlu, who previously competed for Bulgaria under the name Naum Shalamanov, competed for the first time in the Olympics as a Turkish citizen after Bulgarian government received money to allow him to compete.

== Results ==
Rank	Athlete	Group	Body weight	Snatch (kg)				Clean & Jerk (kg)				Total
Rank	Athlete	Group	Body weight	1	2	3	Result	1	2	3	Result	Total
1st place, gold medalist(s)	Naim Süleymanoğlu (TUR)	A	59.70	145	150.5	152.5	152.5	175	188.5	190	190	342.5 WR,OR
2nd place, silver medalist(s)	Stefan Topurov (BUL)	A	59.70	137.5	~~142.5~~	~~142.5~~	137.5	165	175	—	175	312.5
3rd place, bronze medalist(s)	Ye Huanming (CHN)	A	59.70	127.5	~~132.5~~	~~132.5~~	127.5	155	160	~~162.5~~	160	287.5
4	Min Jun-gi (KOR)	A	59.60	120	125	~~127.5~~	125	155	~~160~~	~~162.5~~	155	280
5	Yosuke Muraki (JPN)	A	59.30	120	125	127.5	127.5	~~150~~	150	~~165~~	150	277.5
6	Ioannis Sidiropoulos (GRE)	B	59.45	~~115~~	115	120	120	~~145~~	145	~~150~~	145	265
7	Kazushige Oguri (JPN)	A	59.60	~~117.5~~	117.5	~~122.5~~	117.5	137.5	142.5	~~150~~	142.5	260
8	Tolentino Murillo (COL)	B	59.75	115	120	~~125~~	120	135	~~140~~	140	140	260
9	John Salazar (COL)	B	59.80	105	110	~~112.5~~	110	142.5	150	~~150~~	150	260
10	Angel Arroyo (PUR)	B	59.70	95	100	~~105~~	100	130	135	~~140~~	135	235
11	Juma Abudu (KEN)	B	59.80	80	~~90~~	90	90	~~110~~	110	~~115~~	110	200
—	Wang Caixi (CHN)	A	59.35	125	~~130~~	~~130~~	125	~~157.5~~	~~157.5~~	~~157.5~~	—	—
—	José García (ECU)	B	59.40	~~105~~	~~105~~	105	105	~~140~~	~~140~~	~~140~~	—	—
—	Lionel Gondran (FRA)	B	59.75	110	115	~~117.5~~	115	~~140~~	~~140~~	~~140~~	—	—
—	Dionisio Muñoz (ESP)	A	59.30	~~120~~	~~120~~	~~122.5~~	—	—	—	—	—	—
—	Attila Czanka (ROU)	A	59.80	~~130~~	~~130~~	~~130~~	—	—	—	—	—	—
—	Catur Mei Studi (INA)	B	59.65	~~110~~	~~110~~	—	—	—	—	—	—	—

== Sources ==
- The Official Report of the Games of the XXIV Olympiad Seoul 1988 Volume Two (PDF). p. 643.
