= Angel Arroyo (weightlifter) =

Puerto Rican weightlifter

Personal information
- Nationality: Puerto Rican
- Born: 2 September 1965 (age 60)

Sport
- Sport: Weightlifting

Angel Arroyo (born 2 September 1965) is a Puerto Rican weightlifter. He competed in the men's featherweight event at the 1988 Summer Olympics.
