= Min Jun-gi =

South Korean weightlifter

Personal information
- Nationality: South Korean
- Born: 18 February 1967 (age 58)

Sport
- Sport: Weightlifting

Min Jun-gi (born 18 February 1967) is a South Korean weightlifter. He competed in the men's featherweight event at the 1988 Summer Olympics.
