= José García (weightlifter) =

Ecuadorian weightlifter

Personal information
- Nationality: Ecuadorian
- Born: 6 February 1960 (age 66)

Sport
- Sport: Weightlifting

José García (born 6 February 1960) is an Ecuadorian weightlifter. He competed in the men's featherweight event at the 1988 Summer Olympics.
