= Mikhail Petrov (weightlifter) =

Bulgarian weightlifter (1965–1993)

Personal information
- Born: January 6, 1965 Gabrovo, Bulgaria
- Died: 1993 (aged 27–28)
- Weight: 67.5 kg (149 lb)
Medal record
Men's Weightlifting
Representing Bulgaria
World Championships
Gold medal – first place	1985 Södertälje	–67.5 kg
Gold medal – first place	1986 Sofia	–67.5 kg
Gold medal – first place	1987 Ostrava	–67.5 kg
European Championships
Silver medal – second place	1985 Katowice	–67.5 kg
Silver medal – second place	1986 Karl-Marx-Stadt	–67.5 kg
Gold medal – first place	1987 Reims	–67.5 kg
IWF World Cup Winner
Gold medal – first place	1987 Seoul	–67.5 kg
IWF World Cup Final
Gold medal – first place	1987 Seoul	–67.5 kg
IWF World Cup
Gold medal – first place	1985 Meissen	–67.5 kg
Gold medal – first place	1986 Budapest	–67.5 kg
Gold medal – first place	1987 Budapest	–67.5 kg
Bulgarian Weightlifting Championships
Gold medal – first place	1985 Sliven	–67.5 kg
Gold medal – first place	1986 Kardzhali	–67.5 kg
Gold medal – first place	1987 Yambol	–67.5 kg
Gold medal – first place	1990 Sliven	–67.5 kg
Silver medal – second place	1989 Dobrich	–67.5 kg
Silver medal – second place	1991 Haskovo	–82.5 kg

Mikhail Petrov Petrov (Bulgarian: Михаил Петров Петров; 6 January 1965 – 1993) was a Bulgarian weightlifter who competed in the 1980s. He won three World and one European championships. He competed for the Yantra Gabrovo club from 1980 to 1990, with the exception of 1985-1986 when he was in CSKA. Blagoi Zilyamov was his personal trainer. Petrov is 7 times champion of Bulgaria - 1985, 1986, 1987 and 1990 for men and 1981, 1982 and 1983 for juniors. His strongest year was 1987 when he became World Champion in Ostrava, European Champion in Reims, he won the World Cup after winning the final tournament in Seoul. He also triumphs with the Danube Cup. For this he was elected by the International Weightlifting Federation for The Best weightlifter in the world for 1987.

He set four world records in the 67.5 kg weight class.

Petrov died unexpectedly in 1993 after not waking from anesthesia.
