= Wang Caixi =

Chinese weightlifter

Personal information
- Nationality: Chinese
- Born: 18 November 1964 (age 60)

Sport
- Sport: Weightlifting

Wang Caixi (born 18 November 1964) is a Chinese weightlifter. He competed in the men's featherweight event at the 1988 Summer Olympics.
