= Andrei Socaci =

Romanian weightlifter (1966–2026)

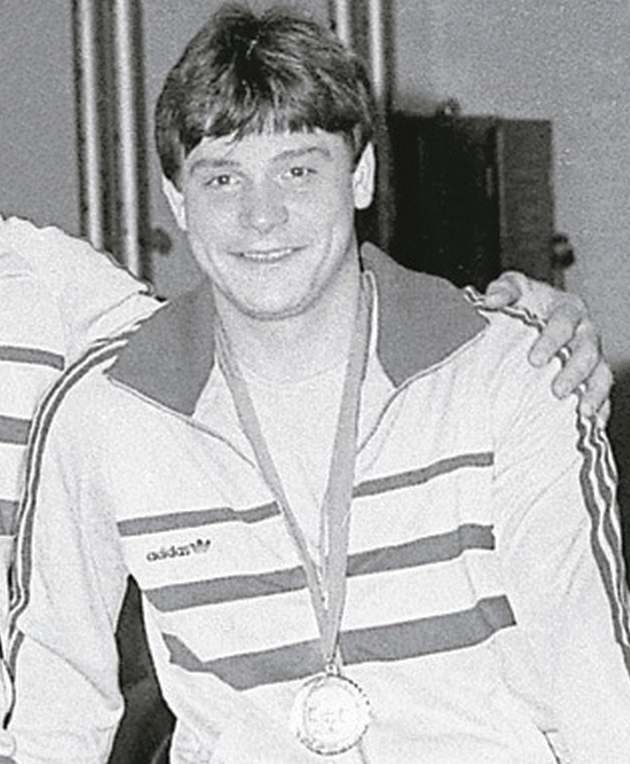
- Socaci, c. 1980s

Personal information
- Born: 19 June 1966 Sântimbru, Alba, Romania
- Died: 12 March 2026 (aged 59)
- Height: 164 cm (5 ft 5 in)

Sport
- Sport: Weightlifting
- Club: Unirea Alba Iulia; Olimpia București; CS Dinamo București
- Coached by: Stefan Sturza
Medal record
Representing Romania
Olympic Games
Silver medal – second place	1984 Los Angeles	-67.5 kg
World Championships
Silver medal – second place	1984 Los Angeles	-67.5 kg
Bronze medal – third place	1985 Södertälje	-75 kg
Bronze medal – third place	1986 Sofia	-75 kg
Silver medal – second place	1990 Budapest	-75 kg
European Championships
Bronze medal – third place	1986 Karl-Marx-Stadt	-75 kg
Silver medal – second place	1987 Reims	-75 kg
Silver medal – second place	1988 Cardiff	-75 kg
Bronze medal – third place	1990 Ålborg	-75 kg
Gold medal – first place	1991 Władysławowo	-75 kg
Silver medal – second place	1992 Szekszárd	-75 kg

Andrei Socaci (19 June 1966 – 12 March 2026) was a Romanian weightlifter. After winning a silver medal at the 1984 Olympics as a lightweight, he moved up to the middleweight division and won nine medals at the world and European championships between 1985 and 1992, including the European title in 1991. After retiring from competition, he stayed as a coach with his last club CS Dinamo București.

Socaci died on 12 March 2026, at the age of 59.
