= Arvo Ojalehto =

Finnish weightlifter

Personal information
- Nationality: Finnish
- Born: 17 April 1957 (age 68) Haapavesi, Finland

Sport
- Sport: Weightlifting

Arvo Ojalehto (born 17 April 1957) is a Finnish weightlifter. He competed at the 1980 Summer Olympics, the 1984 Summer Olympics and the 1988 Summer Olympics.

== Major results ==
| Year | Venue | Weight | Snatch (kg) | | | | | Clean & Jerk (kg) | | | | | Total | Rank |
| Year | Venue | Weight | 1 | 2 | 3 | Result | Rank | 1 | 2 | 3 | Result | Rank | Total | Rank |
Representing Finland
Olympic Games
| 1988 | Seoul, South Korea | 56 kg | ~~105.0~~ | 105.0 | ~~110.0~~ | 105.0 | 12 | ~~137.5~~ | 137.5 | ~~142.5~~ | 137.5 | 8 | 242.5 | 12 |
| 1984 | Los Angeles, United States | 56 kg | 105.0 | ~~110.0~~ | ~~110.0~~ | 105.0 | 9 | ~~137.5~~ | ~~137.5~~ | 137.5 | 137.5 | 6 | 242.5 | 7 |
| 1980 | Moscow, Soviet Union | 56 kg | ~~105.0~~ | ~~105.0~~ | 105.0 | 105.0 | 13 | 132.5 | ~~137.5~~ | ~~137.5~~ | 132.5 | 14 | 237.5 | 13 |
