= Kazushige Oguri =

Japanese weightlifter

Personal information
- Nationality: Japanese
- Born: 28 February 1965 (age 60)

Sport
- Sport: Weightlifting

Kazushige Oguri (小栗 和成, Oguri Kazushige, born 28 February 1965) is a Japanese weightlifter. He competed in the men's featherweight event at the 1988 Summer Olympics.
