= Agron Haxhihyseni =

Albanian weightlifter

Personal information
- Born: Tirana, Albania
- Weight: 52 kg (115 lb)

Sport
- Country: Albania
- Sport: Weightlifting
- Event: 52 kg
Medal record
Men's Weightlifting
Representing Albania
European Weightlifting Championships
Bronze medal – third place	1987 Reims	52 kg

Agron S. Haxhihyseni is a retired Albanian weightlifter. He won third place in the 1987 and 1989 European Weightlifting Championships in the now-defunct flyweight (52 kg) category. In 1990, he won the European Master of Sport title and in the 2015 Merit of Weightlifting (EWF). He broke over 50 national weightlifting records and was a national champion for 10 years from 1975 to 1991. In the 2005 He translated from Russian the boxing book How to be a Champion. In the 2015 He published his book, The Albanian History of Weightlifting. Now he is General Secretary of Albanian Weightlifting Federation.

== See also ==
- List of Albanians
- Sport in Albania
