= Anatoly Khrapaty =

Soviet weightlifter (1962–2008)

Anatoly Krapaty

Personal information
- Nickname: "Siberian Tiger"
- Born: 20 October 1962 Atbasar District, Kazakh SSR, Soviet Union
- Died: 11 August 2008 (aged 45) Arshaly, Kazakhstan
- Height: 171 cm (5 ft 7 in)
- Weight: 89–103 kg (196–227 lb)

Sport
- Sport: Weightlifting
- Club: Armed Forces Tselinograd
Medal record
Men's Weightlifting
Representing the Soviet Union
Olympic Games
Gold medal – first place	1988 Seoul	-90 kg
World Championships
Gold medal – first place	1985 Sodertelje	-90 kg
Gold medal – first place	1986 Sofia	-90 kg
Gold medal – first place	1987 Ostrava	-90 kg
Gold medal – first place	1989 Athens	-90 kg
Gold medal – first place	1990 Budapest	-90 kg
Bronze medal – third place	1993 Melbourne	-91 kg
Bronze medal – third place	1995 Guangzhou	-99 kg
European Championships
Bronze medal – third place	1984 Vittorio	-82.5 kg
Bronze medal – third place	1985 Katowice	-82.5 kg
Gold medal – first place	1986 Karl-Marx-Stadt	-90 kg
Gold medal – first place	1987 Reims	-90 kg
Gold medal – first place	1988 Cardiff	-90 kg
Gold medal – first place	1989 Athens	-90 kg
Gold medal – first place	1990 Aalborg	-90 kg
Representing Kazakhstan
Olympic Games
Silver medal – second place	1996 Atlanta	99 kg
Asian Games
Silver medal – second place	1994 Hiroshima	-91 kg
Silver medal – second place	1998 Bangkok	-105 kg
World Championships
Bronze medal – third place	1993 Melbourne	-91 kg
Bronze medal – third place	1995 Guangzhou	-99 kg

Anatoly Mikhaylovich Khrapaty (also Chrapaty, Russian: Анатолий Михайлович Храпатый; 20 October 1962 – 11 August 2008) was a heavyweight weightlifter, Olympic Champion, and five time World Champion who competed for the Soviet Union and Kazakhstan. Between 1984 and 1996 he won a gold and a silver Olympic medal, as well as five worlds and five European titles. He also set five world records: one in the snatch, three in the clean and jerk and one in the total.

Khrapaty retired after the 2000 Olympic Games to become a Kazakhstan national coach. He died at age 45, a few days before his flight to the 2008 Summer Olympics, when his motorcycle was hit by an oncoming vehicle.

== Major results ==
Year	Venue	Weight	Snatch (kg)				Clean & Jerk (kg)				Total	Rank
Year	Venue	Weight	1	2	3	Rank	1	2	3	Rank	Total	Rank
Olympic Games
1988	Seoul, South Korea	90 kg	180.0	185.0	187.5	1	225.0	~~237.5~~	~~237.5~~	1	412.5	1st place, gold medalist(s)
1996	Atlanta, United States	99 kg	177.5	182.5	187.5	2	217.5	222.5	~~227.5~~	2	410.0	2nd place, silver medalist(s)
2000	Sydney, Australia	105 kg	~~177.5~~	~~177.5~~	~~177.5~~	—	—	—	—	—	—	—
World Championships
1985	Södertälje, Sweden	90 kg	177.5			1st place, gold medalist(s)	217.5			1st place, gold medalist(s)	395.0	1st place, gold medalist(s)
1986	Sofia, Bulgaria	90 kg	185.0			1st place, gold medalist(s)	227.5			1st place, gold medalist(s)	412.5	1st place, gold medalist(s)
1987	Ostrava, Czechoslovakia	90 kg	185.0			2nd place, silver medalist(s)	232.5			1st place, gold medalist(s)	417.5	1st place, gold medalist(s)
1989	Athens, Greece	90 kg	177.5	182.5	185.0	2nd place, silver medalist(s)	225.0	~~230.0~~	230.0	1st place, gold medalist(s)	415.0	1st place, gold medalist(s)
1990	Budapest, Hungary	90 kg	172.5	177.5	180.0	1st place, gold medalist(s)	212.5	217.5	~~225.0~~	1st place, gold medalist(s)	397.5	1st place, gold medalist(s)
1993	Melbourne, Australia	91 kg	175.0	~~180.0~~	180.0	2nd place, silver medalist(s)	215.0	~~220.0~~	~~222.5~~	3rd place, bronze medalist(s)	395.0	3rd place, bronze medalist(s)
1995	Guangzhou, China	99 kg	175.0	~~182.5~~	185.0	2nd place, silver medalist(s)	215.0	—	—	5	400.0	3rd place, bronze medalist(s)
1999	Athens, Greece	105 kg	175.0	180.0	~~185.0~~	11	210.0	~~220.0~~	220.0	9	400.0	10
European Championships
1984	Vitoria, Spain	82.5 kg	175.0			1st place, gold medalist(s)	215.0			3rd place, bronze medalist(s)	390.0	3rd place, bronze medalist(s)
1985	Katowice, Poland	82.5 kg	170.0			2nd place, silver medalist(s)	210.0			3rd place, bronze medalist(s)	380.0	3rd place, bronze medalist(s)
1986	Karl-Marx-Stadt, East Germany	90 kg	180.0			1st place, gold medalist(s)	230.0			1st place, gold medalist(s)	410.0	1st place, gold medalist(s)
1987	Reims, France	90 kg	185.0			1st place, gold medalist(s)	230.0			1st place, gold medalist(s)	415.0	1st place, gold medalist(s)
1988	Cardiff, United Kingdom	90 kg	185.0			2nd place, silver medalist(s)	235.0 WR			1st place, gold medalist(s)	420.0	1st place, gold medalist(s)
1989	Athens, Greece	90 kg	185.0			2nd place, silver medalist(s)	230.0			1st place, gold medalist(s)	415.0	1st place, gold medalist(s)
1990	Ålborg, Denmark	90 kg	182.5			2nd place, silver medalist(s)	220.0			1st place, gold medalist(s)	402.5	1st place, gold medalist(s)
