= Lionel Gondran =

French weightlifter

Personal information
- Nationality: French
- Born: 5 November 1966 (age 58); Montereau, France

Sport
- Sport: Weightlifting

Lionel Gondran (born 5 November 1966) is a French former weightlifter. He competed in the men's featherweight event at the 1988 Summer Olympics.
