= Jacek Gutowski =

Polish weightlifter (1960–1996)

Personal information
- Born: 25 July 1960 Warsaw, Poland
- Died: 1 December 1996 (aged 36) Warsaw, Poland
- Height: 166 cm (5 ft 5 in)

Sport
- Country: Poland
- Sport: Weightlifting
- Weight class: 52 kg
- Team: National team
Medal record
Men's Weightlifting
Representing Poland
World Championships
Silver medal – second place	1981 Lille	52 kg
Silver medal – second place	1983 Moscow	52 kg
Silver medal – second place	1986 Sofia	52 kg
Bronze medal – third place	1982 Ljubljana	52 kg
Bronze medal – third place	1987 Ostrava	52 kg
- Updated on 6 October 2016

Jacek Gutowski (born 25 July 1960 in Warsaw – 1 December 1996 in Warsaw) was a Polish male weightlifter, who competed in the flyweight class and represented Poland at international competitions. He won the silver medal at the 1986 World Weightlifting Championships in the 52 kg category. He participated at the 1988 Summer Olympics in the 52 kg event.
