= Nicu Vlad =

Romanian weightlifter (born 1963)

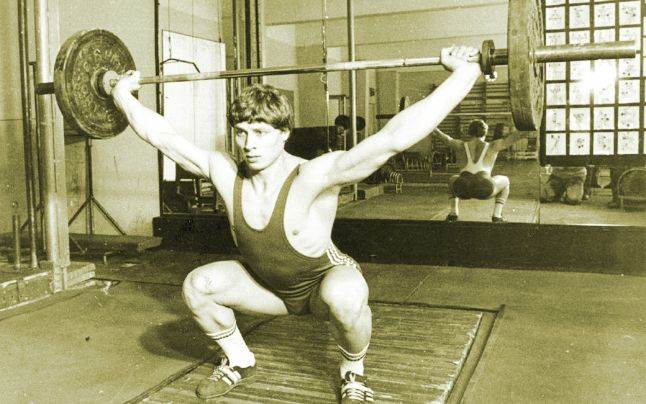

Personal information
- Born: 1 November 1963 (age 62) Piscu, Romania
- Height: 181 cm (5 ft 11 in)

Sport
- Sport: Weightlifting
Medal record
Representing Romania
Olympic Games
| Gold medal – first place | 1984 Los Angeles | -90 kg |
| Silver medal – second place | 1988 Seoul | -100 kg |
| Bronze medal – third place | 1996 Atlanta | -108 kg |
World Championships
| Gold medal – first place | 1984 Los Angeles | -90 kg |
| Bronze medal – third place | 1985 Södertälje | -100 kg |
| Gold medal – first place | 1986 Sofia | -100 kg |
| Silver medal – second place | 1987 Ostrava | -100 kg |
| Silver medal – second place | 1989 Athens | -100 kg |
| Gold medal – first place | 1990 Budapest | -100 kg |
| Silver medal – second place | 1995 Guangzhou | -108 kg |
European Championships
| Gold medal – first place | 1985 Katowice | -100 kg |
| Gold medal – first place | 1986 Karl-Marx-Stadt | -100 kg |
| Silver medal – second place | 1987 Reims | -100 kg |
| Silver medal – second place | 1989 Athens | -100 kg |
| Silver medal – second place | 1990 Aalborg | -100 kg |
| Silver medal – second place | 1996 Stavanger | -108 kg |
Representing Australia
Commonwealth Games
| Gold medal – first place | 1994 Victoria | -108 kg - Overall |
| Gold medal – first place | 1994 Victoria | -108 kg - Snatch |
| Gold medal – first place | 1994 Victoria | -108 kg - Clean and Jerk |
World Championships
| Silver medal – second place | 1994 Istanbul | -108 kg |

Nicolae "Nicu" Vlad (born 1 November 1963) is a retired heavyweight weightlifter from Romania. He competed for Romania at the 1984, 1988, 1992 and 1996 Olympics and won a gold, a silver and a bronze medal. He won the world title in 1984, 1986 and 1990 and European title in 1985 and 1986 and set world records in the snatch in 1986 and 1993. Between 1991 and 1996, he lived in Australia and competed for it internationally. In 2006, he was elected member of the International Weightlifting Federation Hall of Fame. He is still especially noteworthy for achieving the heaviest-ever snatch of double-bodyweight—lifting 200.5 kg in the 100 kg class.

== Biography ==
Vlad was born in a family of three brothers and one sister in a village of Piscu in Galați County. His mother was a housewife and father worked for the national railway carrier Căile Ferate Române; he did not do any particular sport, but was a strong man weighing 100 kg at 172 cm height. After completing a school in Galați, Vlad moved to Bucharest.

In 1990, Nicu and his coach, Dragomir Cioroslan came to the United States to train at various places around the country.

Between 1991 and 1996, Vlad lived in Australia and competed at the 1994 Commonwealth Games winning two world championships during this time. In 1996, he returned to Romania, but still has strong ties to Australia visiting regularly as his two children continue to live there. Nicu is married to the former rower Cristina Vlad.

Nicu took up weightlifting in 1978 and retired after the 1996 Olympics to become a national coach. In 2001, he was elected president of the Romanian Weightlifting Federation, and in 2004 vice president of the Romanian Olympic Committee. He also served as first vice president of the International Weightlifting Federation, (IWF).

In June 2021 as Vice President of the IWF, Vlad was charged with complicity and tampering with multiple anti-doping rule violations by the International Testing Agency. It was alleged that Vlad conspired with the president of the IWF, Tamás Aján, to allow Romanian weightlifter Roxana Cocoș to compete at the 2012 Olympics despite having tested positive for anabolic steroids just 3 months earlier. On 16 June 2022 Vlad received a lifetime ban from the sport of weightlifting.

== Romanian deadlift ==
Owing to Vlad, the flat-backed, semi-stiff legged barbell lift (with a form similar to a deadlift) came to be known as the Romanian deadlift. He was seen by some American lifters doing the deadlifts in the Olympic training hall prior to either winning a medal, setting a world record or both. Since he is Romanian, the exercise got dubbed the Romanian deadlift, and that is the name most people know the exercise by.

As the exercise does not involve lifting the weight off the ground, it is not technically a deadlift, but rather a powerful compound accessory movement that strengthens the same muscles.
