= Naim Süleymanoğlu =

Turkish weightlifter (1967–2017)

- Süleymanoğlu in 1996

Personal information
- Nickname: The Pocket Hercules
- Citizenship: Bulgaria, Turkey
- Born: Naim Suleymanoglu; 23 January 1967 Ptichar, Kardzhali Province, Bulgaria
- Died: 18 November 2017 (aged 50) Istanbul, Turkey
- Years active: 1982–2000
- Height: 1.47 m (4 ft 10 in) (2000)
- Weight: 62 kg (137 lb) (2000)

Sport
- Country: Bulgaria (1977–1986); Turkey (1986–2000)
- Sport: Olympic weightlifting
- Events: 56 kg (1983), 60 kg (1985–1992), 64 kg (1993–1996), 62 kg (2000)
- Turned pro: 1983
- Retired: 2000

Achievements and titles
- Personal bests: Snatch: 152.5 kg (1988, WR); Clean & Jerk: 190.0 kg (1988, WR); Total: 342.5 (1988, WR)
Medal record
Representing Turkey
Olympic Games
Gold medal – first place	1988 Seoul	-60 kg
Gold medal – first place	1992 Barcelona	-60 kg
Gold medal – first place	1996 Atlanta	-64 kg
World Championships
Gold medal – first place	1989 Athens	-60 kg
Gold medal – first place	1991 Donaueschingen	-60 kg
Gold medal – first place	1993 Melbourne	64 kg
Gold medal – first place	1994 Istanbul	-64 kg
Gold medal – first place	1995 Guangzhou	-64 kg
European Championships
Gold medal – first place	1988 Cardiff	-60 kg
Gold medal – first place	1989 Athens	-60 kg
Gold medal – first place	1994 Sokolov	-64 kg
Gold medal – first place	1995 Warsaw	-64 kg
Silver medal – second place	1992 Szekszárd	-60 kg
Bronze medal – third place	2000 Sofia	-62 kg
Mediterranean Games
Gold medal – first place	1991 Athens	60 kg S
Gold medal – first place	1991 Athens	60 kg CJ
Gold medal – first place	1991 Athens	60 kg T
Representing Bulgaria
World Championships
Gold medal – first place	1985 Södertälje	-60 kg
Gold medal – first place	1986 Sofia	-60 kg
Silver medal – second place	1983 Moscow	-56 kg
European Championships
Gold medal – first place	1984 Vitoria	-56 kg
Gold medal – first place	1985 Katowice	-60 kg
Gold medal – first place	1986 Karl-Marx-Stadt	-60 kg
Silver medal – second place	1983 Moscow	-56 kg
World Junior Championships
Gold medal – first place	1982 Sao Paulo	-52 kg
IWF World Cup Final
Gold medal – first place	1984 Sarajevo	-56 kg
Gold medal – first place	1985 Monte Carlo	-60 kg
IWF World Cup Winner
Gold medal – first place	1984 Sarajevo	-56 kg
Gold medal – first place	1985 Monte Carlo	-60 kg
Gold medal – first place	1986 Melbourne	-60 kg
Friendship Games
Gold medal – first place	1984 Varna	-56 kg

Naim Süleymanoğlu (23 January 1967 – 18 November 2017) was a Turkish Olympic weightlifter. He was a seven-time World Weightlifting champion and a three-time Olympic gold medalist who set 51 world records. At 147 cm in height, Süleymanoğlu's short stature and great strength led to him being nicknamed "Pocket Hercules". He is widely considered as one of the greatest Olympic weightlifters of all time, with many calling him the best pound-for-pound weightlifter in the history of weightlifting.

At the 1988 Summer Olympics, Süleymanoğlu set multiple world records in the featherweight division in the snatch, clean and jerk, and total. Following the 1988 Summer Olympics, he made the cover of Time magazine. Süleymanoğlu went on to win Olympic gold in 1992 and 1996. He was awarded the Olympic Order in 2001. In 2000 and 2004, he was elected as a member of the International Weightlifting Federation Hall of Fame.

== Early life and career ==
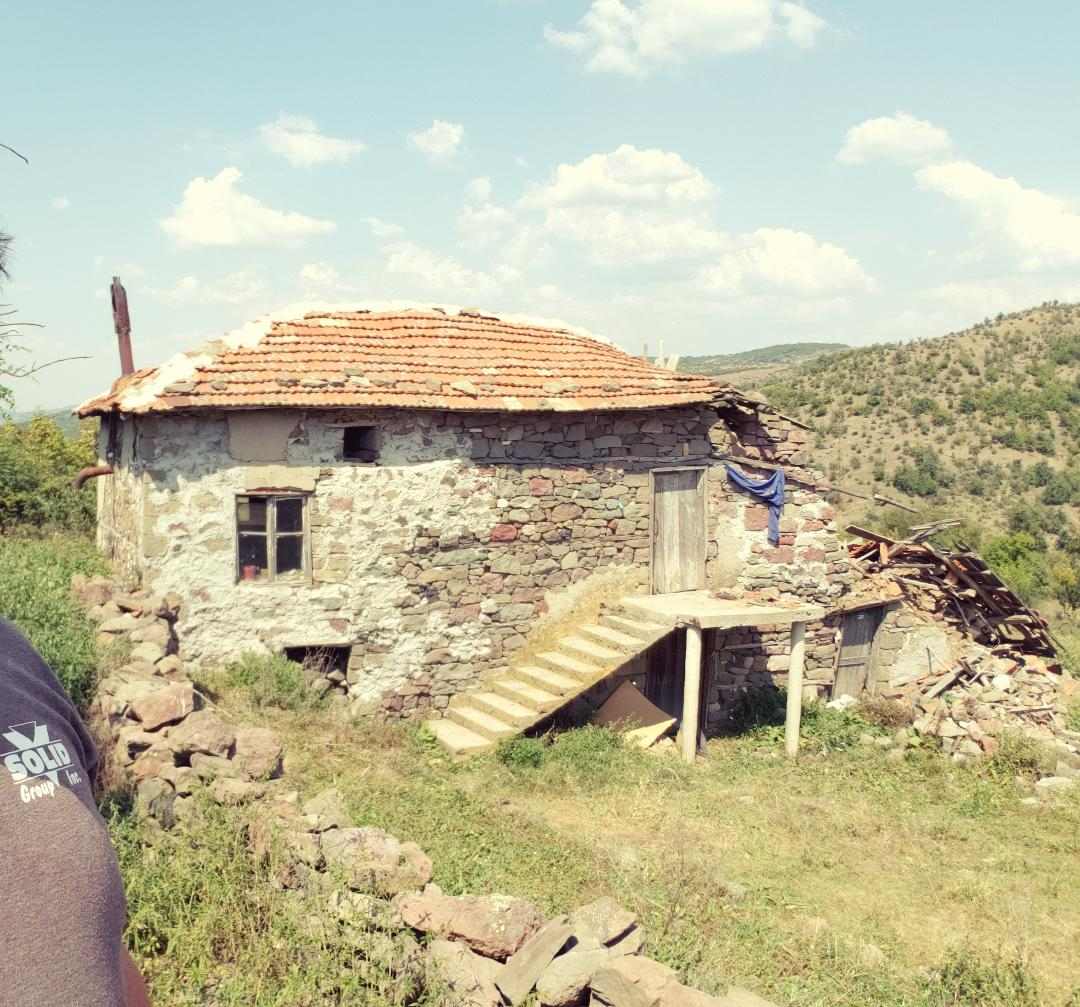
Birthplace of Süleymanoğlu in Ptichar village, Kardzhali, Bulgaria.

Süleymanoğlu was born in Ptichar, Kardzhali Province, Bulgaria. His father was a miner who stood only five feet tall, while his mother was four-foot-seven. He set a world weightlifting record during his teens and would have been an overwhelming favorite to win gold at the 1984 Summer Olympics had Bulgaria not joined in a boycott by the Eastern Bloc.

In the 1980s, Bulgaria's government implemented a program called the Revival Process which required ethnic minorities to adopt Slavic names and barred their languages. As a result, Süleymanoğlu was forced to change his name to Naum Shalamanov (Bulgarian: Наум Шаламанов) in 1985. He decided to leave Bulgaria after these experiences and he conducted encrypted correspondence with Turkish Squad during the period.

While on a trip to the World Cup Final in Melbourne in 1986, Süleymanoğlu escaped his handlers, and after several days in hiding, he defected at the Turkish Embassy in Canberra. When Embassy officials reported the situation to Turgut Özal, The Prime Minister ordered him to be brought at once. He landed in London first, where he was transferred into a private jet to fly into Istanbul and Ankara eventually. After making his way to Istanbul, he changed his name back to Süleymanoğlu.

In 2012, Süleymanoğlu said, "Against all the odds, I've never been nostalgic. After being treated with such attitude, you wouldn't regret it. The Bulgarians changed the names of 2 million people by force. It was a very difficult period. People who witnessed the events would know. I wouldn't change any of the decisions I took that day in my life. Even if I could set back the clock, I would still escape Bulgaria. Because as the Turkish people, we were too hard-pressed in Bulgaria."

== Olympic competition ==
In order for Süleymanoğlu to compete at the 1988 Seoul Olympics, the Bulgarian government had to agree to release his eligibility to Turkey. The Turks paid Bulgaria $1.25 million for his release.

At the Olympics, Süleymanoğlu competed in the featherweight division. His main competition was his old teammate from the Bulgarian team, Stefan Topurov. He came out for the snatch portion of the competition after all other athletes had finished and made three consecutive lifts, setting world records in his last two attempts. In the clean and jerk portion, Topurov completed a 175.0 kg clean and jerk after Süleymanoğlu. With his next two lifts, Süleymanoğlu set two more world records and won his first Olympic gold. His last lift was a 190.0 kg clean and jerk that was 3.15 times his body weight, which is the highest ratio clean and jerk to body weight of all time. Using the Sinclair coefficient, his performance at the 1988 Seoul Olympics was the most dominating weightlifting performance of all time. His total was high enough to win the weight class above his. After the 1988 Summer Olympics, Süleymanoğlu appeared on the cover of Time magazine. The 4'10" Süleymanoğlu's "diminutive size and stunning strength" led to him being nicknamed "Pocket Hercules".

Süleymanoğlu retired from weightlifting at the age of 22 after winning the world championship in 1989. However, he returned to the sport in 1991 and won a second Olympic gold medal in Barcelona in 1992. He retired after winning a third consecutive Olympic gold medal in Atlanta at the 1996 Olympic Games. That competition was noted for the rivalry between Süleymanoğlu and Greece's Valerios Leonidis, with the arena divided into partisan Turkish and Greek crowds. At the end of the competition, they were the last competitors remaining as they traded three straight world-record lifts. Süleymanoğlu managed to raise 187.5 kg, and then Leonidis failed in his attempt to lift 190 kg which earned Süleymanoğlu the gold medal. In a show of sportsmanship Süleymanoğlu embraced Leonidis, who had broken down in tears. Announcer Lynn Jones proclaimed, "You have just witnessed the greatest weightlifting competition in history," according to Ken Jones of The Independent.

Süleymanoğlu made another comeback in a late attempt to earn a fourth gold medal at the 2000 Olympic Games in Sydney, which would have been an Olympic record. However, he failed three attempts at 145 kg and was eliminated from the competition.

Süleymanoğlu is the first and only weightlifter to have snatched 2.5 times his body weight and also is the second of only seven lifters to date to clean and jerk three times his body weight. He is the only weightlifter to date to clean and jerk 10 kilos more than triple his body weight.

Over the course of his career, Süleymanoğlu has won seven World Weightlifting champion and three Olympic gold medals, and set a total of 51 world records from 1983 to 1996. Only Vasily Alekseyev and David Rigert have set more world records in weightlifting. Süleymanoğlu was awarded the Olympic Order in 2001. In 2000 and 2004, he was elected a member of the International Weightlifting Federation Hall of Fame. Süleymanoğlu is widely considered to have been the best pound-for-pound Olympic weightlifter of all time, and one of the greatest Olympic weightlifters ever. He is regarded as a national hero in Turkey.

== Political career ==
At the 1999 general elections, Süleymanoğlu stood as an independent candidate to represent Bursa at the Grand National Assembly of Turkey. In 2002, he was the candidate of the Nationalist Movement Party for the mayor of Kıraç municipality in Büyükçekmece district of Istanbul Province; he represented the same party in general elections in 2006. Süleymanoğlu was unsuccessful in each of these bids for public office.

== Personal life and death ==
A heavy drinker, Süleymanoğlu suffered from cirrhosis of the liver. In 2009, he was hospitalized for nearly three months.

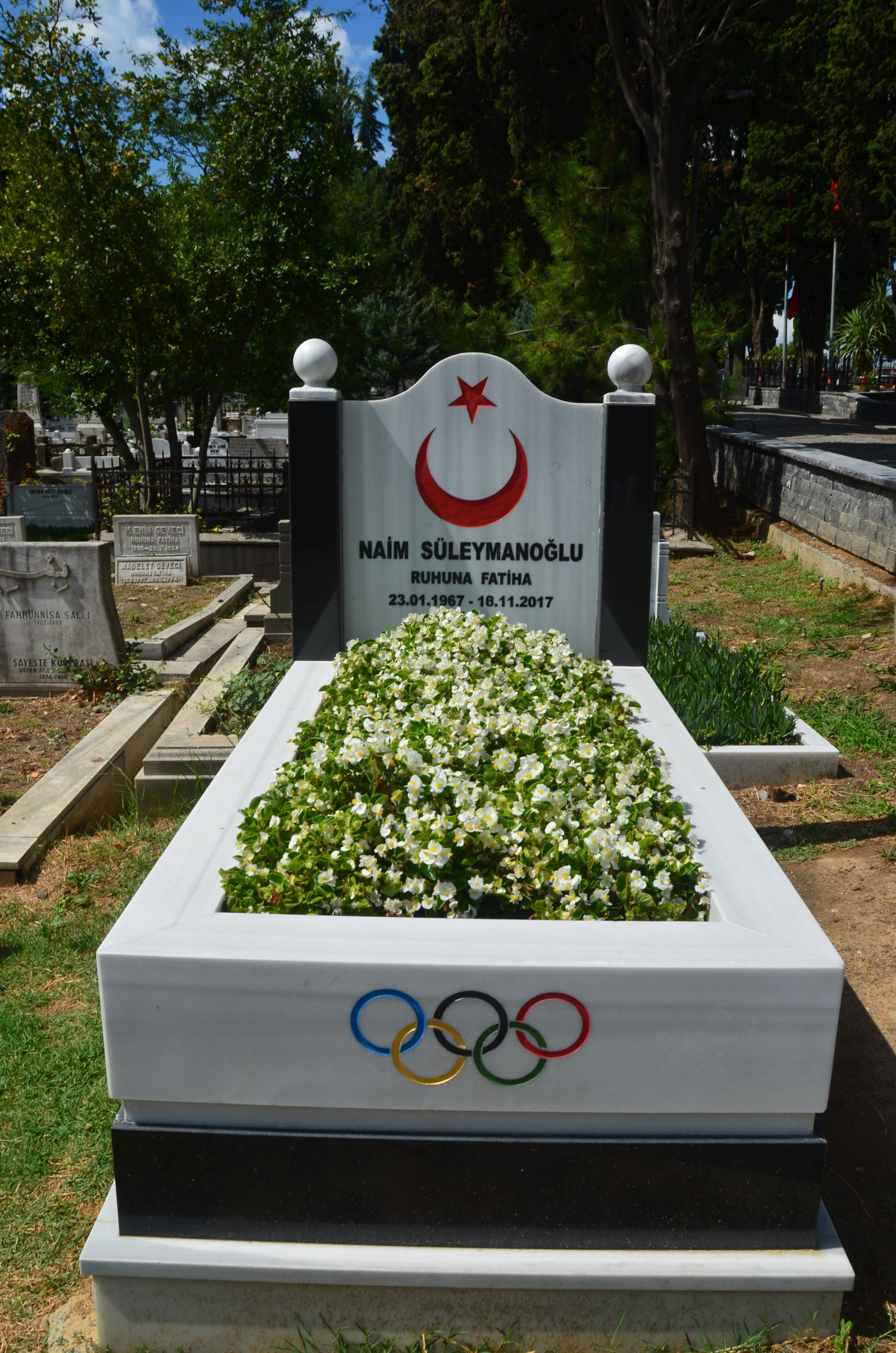
Grave of Naim Süleymanoğlu at Edirnekapı Cemetery, Istanbul.

On 25 September 2017, Süleymanoğlu was admitted to a hospital due to liver failure. On 6 October, a liver transplantation was made when a liver donor was found. On 11 November, he had surgery due to a hemorrhage in the brain and a subsequent edema. He died on 18 November 2017 and was interred at the Edirnekapı Martyr's Cemetery in Istanbul. Many dignitaries and prominent athletes attended Süleymanoğlu's funeral, including his rival in the 1996 Summer Olympics, Greece's Valerios Leonidis.

A movie about his life and career entitled Cep Herkülü: Naim Süleymanoğlu was released in Turkey on 22 November 2019.

Süleymanoğlu's grave was opened on 4 July 2018 for the purpose of extracting a DNA sample. Following his death, a Japanese woman had claimed that her daughter, Sekai Mori, had been fathered by him, and filed a paternity case at a Turkish court. A DNA test confirmed the paternity claim. Süleymanoğlu also had three daughters by a Turkish woman.

== Legacy ==
Naim Süleymanoğlu is regarded as one of the greatest weightlifters in the history of the sport. His achievements and international recognition made him an important cultural figure among Bulgarian Turks and in Turkey.

=== Naim Süleymanoğlu Monument ===
In his hometown of Momchilgrad (Turkish: Mestanli), a monument dedicated to Süleymanoğlu was erected in the town center to commemorate his achievements and connection to the region. The monument is considered one of the notable landmarks of the town.

=== Sport Complex “Naim Süleymanoğlu” ===
A sports complex bearing his name was opened in Momchilgrad. The facility was established to promote youth sports and physical education. It hosts various sporting and community events throughout the year.

=== Naim Süleymanoğlu Museum ===
A museum dedicated to Süleymanoğlu was established in Momchilgrad. The museum contains medals, photographs, documents, and personal belongings related to his life and sporting career. It serves as a cultural and historical site visited by tourists and sports enthusiasts.

Süleymanoğlu continues to be remembered as an influential figure in weightlifting history and among Balkan Turks

=== Biopic ===
The biographical film about Naim Süleymanoğlu is titled Pocket Hercules: Naim Suleymanoglu (Turkish: Cep Herkülü: Naim Süleymanoğlu). The film was released in 2019 and directed by Özer Feyzioğlu. The film stars Hayat Van Eck as Süleymanoğlu and covers the period from his childhood in Bulgaria to his gold medal victory at the 1988 Seoul Olympics. It also portrays the assimilation campaign against Turks in Bulgaria during the communist era and Süleymanoğlu's role in drawing international attention to the situation.

The film was released theatrically in Turkey on 22 November 2019 and was later distributed internationally on Netflix under the English title The Pocket Hercules Naim.

== Major results ==
Year	Venue	Weight	Snatch (kg)				Clean & Jerk (kg)				Total	Rank
Year	Venue	Weight	1	2	3	Rank	1	2	3	Rank	Total	Rank
Olympic Games
1988	Seoul, South Korea	60 kg	145.0	150.5 WR	152.5 WR	1	175.0	188.5 WR	190.0 WR	1	342.5 WR	1st place, gold medalist(s)
1992	Barcelona, Spain	60 kg	142.5	~~153~~	~~153~~	1	170	177.5	—	1	320	1st place, gold medalist(s)
1996	Atlanta, United States	64 kg	145	~~147.5~~	147.5	1	180	185	187.5	1	335 WR	1st place, gold medalist(s)
2000	Sydney, Australia	62 kg	~~145~~	~~145~~	~~145~~	—	—	—	—	—	—	—
World Championships
1983	Moscow, Soviet Union	56 kg	130.0 WR	—	—	1st place, gold medalist(s)	160.0	—	—	3rd place, bronze medalist(s)	290.0	2nd place, silver medalist(s)
1985	Södertälje, Sweden	60 kg	143 WR	—	—	1st place, gold medalist(s)	180.0	—	—	1st place, gold medalist(s)	322.5	1st place, gold medalist(s)
1986	Sofia, Bulgaria	60 kg	147.5 WR	—	—	1st place, gold medalist(s)	188 WR	—	—	1st place, gold medalist(s)	335 WR	1st place, gold medalist(s)
1989	Athens, Greece	60 kg	140.0	145.0	—	1st place, gold medalist(s)	~~172.5~~	172.5	~~192.5~~	1st place, gold medalist(s)	317.5	1st place, gold medalist(s)
1991	Donaueschingen, Germany	60 kg	135.0	137.5	~~140.0~~	1st place, gold medalist(s)	165.0	172.5	~~180.0~~	1st place, gold medalist(s)	310.0	1st place, gold medalist(s)
1993	Melbourne, Australia	64 kg	140.0	145.0	—	1st place, gold medalist(s)	~~175.0~~	177.5 WR	—	1st place, gold medalist(s)	322.5 WR	1st place, gold medalist(s)
1994	Istanbul, Turkey	64 kg	142.5	145.0	147.5 WR	1st place, gold medalist(s)	177.5	181.0	182.5 WR	1st place, gold medalist(s)	330.0 WR	1st place, gold medalist(s)
1995	Guangzhou, China	64 kg	~~145.0~~	145.0	147.5	1st place, gold medalist(s)	180.0	~~185.0~~	—	1st place, gold medalist(s)	327.5	1st place, gold medalist(s)
Friendship Games
1984	Varna, Bulgaria	56 kg	132.5	—	—	1	165.0	—	—	1	297.5	1st place, gold medalist(s)

== Career bests ==
- Snatch: 152.5 kg in class to 60 kg.
- Clean and jerk: 170.5 kg 1984 in Varna in class to 56 kg.
- Clean and jerk: 190.0 kg in class to 60 kg.
- Total: 342.5 kg (152.5 + 190.0) 1988 Summer Olympics in class to 60 kg.

== See also ==
- Hafız Süleymanoğlu
