= Mitko Grablev =

Bulgarian weightlifter

Personal information
- Born: September 21, 1964 (age 61) Pazardzhik or Panagyurishte [contradiction], Bulgaria
Medal record
Men's Weightlifting
Representing Bulgaria
Olympic Games
Disqualified	1988 Seoul	56 kg
World Weightlifting Championships
Gold medal – first place	1986 Sofia	56 kg
European Weightlifting Championships
Gold medal – first place	1987 Reims	56 kg
Gold medal – first place	1988 Cardiff	56 kg
Bronze medal – third place	1986 Karl-Marx-Stadt	56 kg
IWF World Cup
Gold medal – first place	1987 Pazardzhik	60 kg
Junior World Weightlifting Championships
Gold medal – first place	1984 Lignano Sabbiadoro	56 kg
Junior European Weightlifting Championships
Gold medal – first place	1984 Lignano Sabbiadoro	56 kg
Balkan Weightlifting Championships
Gold medal – first place	1983 Thessaloniki	56 kg
Gold medal – first place	1984 Kikinda	56 kg
Gold medal – first place	1985 Plovdiv	56 kg

Mitko Todorov Grablev (Bulgarian: Митко Тодоров Гръблев) is a Bulgarian weightlifter who competed for Bulgaria. He is a twice European champion and a world record holder. He originally claimed the gold medal in Weightlifting at the 1988 Summer Olympics – Men's 56 kg but was disqualified after he tested positive for furosemide. It became a scandal after another Bulgarian weightlifter Angel Guenchev, who also originally claimed a gold medal in weightlifting, was disqualified for failing a drug test and resulting to a positive result for the doping agent furosemide. The Bulgarian weightlifting team was forced to withdraw midway from the weightlifting competition.
