= Sevdalin Marinov =

Bulgarian weightlifter (born 1968)

Personal information
- Nationality: Bulgarian
- Born: 11 June 1968 (age 58) Asenovgrad

Sport
- Sport: Weightlifting
Medal record
Representing Bulgaria
Olympic Games
| Gold medal – first place | 1988 Seoul | -52 kg |
World Weightlifting Championships
| Gold medal – first place | 1985 Södertälje | -52 kg |
| Gold medal – first place | 1986 Sofia | -52 kg |
| Gold medal – first place | 1987 Ostrava | -52 kg |
European Weightlifting Championships
| Gold medal – first place | 1985 Katowice | -52 kg |
| Gold medal – first place | 1986 Karl-Marx-Stadt | -52 kg |
| Gold medal – first place | 1987 Reims | -52 kg |
| Gold medal – first place | 1988 Cardiff | -52 kg |
| Gold medal – first place | 1990 Aalborg | -56 kg |
| Silver medal – second place | 1989 Athens | -56 kg |
IWF World Cup Final
| Silver medal – second place | 1988 Athens | -52 kg |
IWF World Cup
| Gold medal – first place | 1987 Budapest | -56 kg |
| Gold medal – first place | 1987 Pazardzhik | -56 kg |
| Gold medal – first place | 1988 Plovdiv | -56 kg |
Friendship Cup
| Silver medal – second place | 1985 Erevan | -52 kg |
Bulgarian Weightlifting Championships
| Gold medal – first place | 1989 Dobrich | -56 kg |
| Gold medal – first place | 1988 Sliven | -56 kg |
| Silver medal – second place | 1987 Yambol | -56 kg |
| Gold medal – first place | 1986 Kardzhali | -56 kg |
| Bronze medal – third place | 1985 Sliven | -56 kg |
Representing Australia
Commonwealth Games
| Gold medal – first place | 1994 Victoria BC | 64kg Total |
| Silver medal – second place | 1994 Victoria BC | 64kg Snatch |
| Silver medal – second place | 1994 Victoria BC | 64kg Clean and Jerk |

Sevdalin Marinov (Bulgarian: Севдалин Маринов; born 11 June 1968) is a former Bulgarian weightlifter. He became Olympic Champion in 1988 in the Flyweight class.

Sevdalin competed many times internationally and went on to win many Olympic and commonwealth medals. Marinov became one of the three youngest Bulgarian Olympic champions in weightlifting (20 years, 3 months and 7 days). He is a three-time World (1985 in Södertälje, Sweden, 1986 in Sofia, Bulgaria, and 1987 in Ostrava, Czech Republic) and a five-time European champion (1985 in Katowice, Poland, 1986 in Karl-Marx-Stadt, Germany, 1987 in Reims, France, 1988 in Cardiff, UK, and 1990 in Aalborg, Denmark). In the period between 1985 and 1988, he was literally unbeatable at major forums in the category of up to 52 kg. He has a total of 6 World and 9 Olympic records.

In 1979 Sevdalin Marinov started his training at the Vasil Levski Sports School and trained under the coach Dimitar Stoykov. He competed consecutively for the teams of Asenovets (from 1978 until 1983), Maritsa (from 1983 until 1987) and CSKA (from 1988 until 1991). In 1991 Marinov settled in Australia and after 1993 continued his career in the Green Continent. In 1994 he became a champion of the Commonwealth Games in the category of 64 kg.
