= Zoltán Balázsfi =

Hungarian weightlifter

Personal information
- Nationality: Hungarian
- Born: 7 July 1962 (age 62); Szeged, Hungary

Sport
- Sport: Weightlifting

Zoltán Balázsfi (born 7 July 1962) is a Hungarian weightlifter. He competed in the men's middle heavyweight event at the 1988 Summer Olympics.
