= Angel Genchev =

Bulgarian weightlifter (born 1967)

Personal information
- Born: January 31, 1967 (age 59) Targovishte, Bulgaria
Medal record
Men's weightlifting
Representing Bulgaria
Olympic Games
Disqualified	1988 Seoul	–67.5 kg
World Championships
Bronze medal – third place	1994 Istanbul	–70 kg
European Championships
Gold medal – first place	1988 Cardiff	–75 kg
EWF European Team Cup
Gold medal – first place	1986 Reims	–75 kg
Gold medal – first place	1987 Miskolc	–75 kg
World Cup
Gold medal – first place	1986 Dobrich	–67.5 kg
Gold medal – first place	1988 Plovdiv	–75 kg
World Masters Championships
Gold medal – first place	2024 Rovaniemi	–73 kg
Gold medal – first place	2018 Barcelona	–69 kg
Gold medal – first place	2017 Anaheim	–77 kg
Bronze medal – third place	2023 Wieliczka	–81 kg
European Masters Championships
Gold medal – first place	2018 Budapest	–77 kg
Gold medal – first place	2017 Halmstad	–77 kg
Junior World Championships
Gold medal – first place	1984 Lignano Sabbiadoro	–60 kg
Gold medal – first place	1985 Edinburgh	–60 kg
Gold medal – first place	1986 Donaueschingen	–67.5 kg
Gold medal – first place	1987 Belgrade	–75 kg
European Junior Championships
Gold medal – first place	1984 Lignano Sabbiadoro	–60 kg
Gold medal – first place	1985 Edinburgh	–60 kg
Gold medal – first place	1986 Donaueschingen	–67.5 kg
Gold medal – first place	1987 Belgrade	–75 kg
Balkan Weightlifting Championships
Gold medal – first place	1987 Tirana	–75 kg
Bulgarian Weightlifting Championships
Gold medal – first place	1987 Yambol	–75 kg
Gold medal – first place	1994 Shumen	–70 kg
Silver medal – second place	1992 Shumen	–67.5 kg

Angel Angelov Genchev (Bulgarian: Ангел Ангелов Генчев) is a Bulgarian weightlifter who competed for Bulgaria. He claimed the gold medal in weightlifting at the 1988 Summer Olympics – Men's 67.5 kg but was disqualified after he tested positive for furosemide, an IOC banned substance. It became a scandal because earlier in the meet fellow Bulgarian weightlifter Mitko Grablev had also been disqualified, after claiming a gold medal in his division, when his drug test came back positive, also for furosemide. The Bulgarian weightlifting team was forced to withdraw midway through the Weightlifting competition. Of six athletes known to have lifted more than triple their bodyweight, Genchev's 202.5 kg world record was the heaviest ever performed in competition. Genchev is a European champion in the 75 kg category from Cardiff in 1988. He was also a bronze medalist at the 1994 World Championships in Istanbul. He won the European Cup in Reims 1986 and Miskolc 1987 with the team of Bulgaria. There he set a world record in snatch - 170 kg. Angel is a four-time World and European junior champion.

Genchev served some time in prison for shooting at a cab driver in Bulgaria in 2001.

Genchev competed in the 2017 World Masters games in Auckland, New Zealand and won Gold in the M77kg division for the 50-54years age group. He snatched 95 kg and Clean and jerked 120 kg.

Genchev competed in the 2017 European Masters Championships in Halmstad, Sweden, snatching 105 kg and Clean and Jerking 132 kg to win his division.

Genchev competed in the 2018 European Masters Championships in Budapest, Hungary, snatching 90 kg and Clean and Jerking 112 kg to win his division.

Genchev competed in the 2018 World Masters Championships in Barcelona, Spain, snatching 96 kg and Clean and Jerking 122 kg to win his division.

Genchev competed in the 2023 World Masters Championships in Wieliczka, Poland, snatching 91 kg and Clean and Jerking 111 kg to finish 3rd in his division.

Genchev competed in the 2024 World Masters Championships in Rovaniemi, Finland, snatching 89 kg and Clean and Jerking 107 kg to finish 1st in his division.
