= Ye Huanming =

Chinese weightlifter (born 1965)

Medal record

Men's Weightlifting

Olympic Games
Bronze medal – third place	1988 Seoul	56-60 kg

Ye Huanming (Chinese: 叶焕明; born 6 August 1965) is a male Chinese weightlifter. He competed at 1988 Seoul Olympics, and won a bronze medal in Men's 56–60 kg (featherweight). His final score was 287.5 kg.
