= Borislav Gidikov =

Bulgarian weightlifter (born 1965)

Personal information
- Born: November 3, 1965 (age 60)
Medal record
Men's Olympic weightlifting
Olympic Games
Gold medal – first place	1988 Seoul	-75 kg
World Championships Total
Gold medal – first place	1987 Ostrava	-75 kg
Silver medal – second place	1986 Sofia	-75 kg
European Championships Total
Silver medal – second place	1986 Karl-Marx-Stadt	-75 kg
Bronze medal – third place	1987 Reims	-75 kg
IWF World Cup Final Total
Bronze medal – third place	1987 Seoul	-75 kg
IWF World Cup Total
Gold medal – first place	1985 Varna	-75 kg
Gold medal – first place	1986 Dobrich	-82,5 kg
Gold medal – first place	1986 Meissen	-75 kg
Gold medal – first place	1987 Pazardzhik	-75 kg
Gold medal – first place	1988 Plovdiv	-82,5 kg
Gold medal – first place	1988 Budapest	-82,5 kg
EWF European Team Cup Total
Gold medal – first place	1986 Reims	-75 kg
Junior World Championships Total
Gold medal – first place	1984 Lignano Sabbiadoro	-67,5 kg
Silver medal – second place	1985 Edinburgh	-75 kg
European Junior Championships Total
Gold medal – first place	1984 Lignano Sabbiadoro	-67,5 kg
Silver medal – second place	1985 Edinburgh	-75 kg
Bulgarian Championships Total
Gold medal – first place	1986 Kardzhali	-75 kg
Bulgarian Junior&Youth Championships Total
Gold medal – first place	1985 Pleven	-75 kg
Bronze medal – third place	1982 Pazardzhik	-56 kg

Borislav Krastev Gidikov (Bulgarian: Борислав Кръстев Гидиков; born November 3, 1965, in Pazardzhik, Pazardzhik Province) is a former Bulgarian weightlifter.

== Professional career ==
He became Olympic Champion in 1988 in the middleweight class. His career continued from 1979 to 1990. Until 1983, he was a competitor of Hebar Pazardzhik, and then until 1990, he was a competitor of Slavia Sofia.

His personal trainers were Hristo Popov and Lyudmil Kochev. In the national team, Bulgaria was trained by the great Ivan Abadjiev. The story of how Borislav chose weightlifting before football is interesting. His father was a bus driver at Hebar football club. When Gidikov wondered which sport to choose in the beginning, his father told him that in football he would depend on another 10 people, and in weightlifting he would depend only on himself. So Borislav chose weightlifting to become one of the greatest Bulgarian weightlifters in the 1980s.

His most notable success was in 1988, when he made six successful attempts at the Seoul Olympics to win the gold medal in cat. 75 kg. He is former Secretary General of the Bulgarian Weightlifting Federation.
