= Andor Szanyi =

Hungarian weightlifter

Personal information
- Born: August 1, 1964 (age 62) Mezőcsát, Borsod-Abaúj-Zemplén, Hungary
Medal record
Men's Weightlifting
Representing Hungary
Olympic Games
Disqualified	1988 Seoul	100 Kg

Andor Szanyi is a weightlifter who competed for Hungary. His entire career has been marred by controversy after he was stripped of the silver medal at the 1988 Summer Olympics for cheating.

He claimed the gold medal at the 1985 World Weightlifting Championships in Södertalje, Sweden in the 100 kg category. He also claimed bronze medals at the next two world championships in Sofia and Ostrava respectively, and was European Champion in 1987 and bronze medalist in 1985, 1988 and 1991.

He claimed the silver medal in the 1988 Summer Olympics but was disqualified and banned from the Olympic Games after he tested positive for stanozolol. He was the second Hungarian weightlifter to test positive at the games after Kalman Csengeri, who cheated using extra testosterone.
