= Yury Zakharevich =

Russian retired weightlifter (born 1963)

Personal information
- Nationality: Soviet Union
- Born: Yury Ivanovich Zakharevich; January 18, 1963 (age 63) Mokshino, Kalinin Oblast, Soviet Union
- Height: 5 ft 11 in (1.80 m)

Sport
- Country: Soviet Union
- Sport: Weightlifting
- Events: 90 kg 100 kg 110 kg

Achievements and titles
- Personal bests: Snatch: 210 kg (1988), Clean and jerk: 250 kg (1988), Total: 455 kg (1988)
Medal record
Men's Olympic weightlifting
Olympic Games
Gold medal – first place	1988 Seoul	110 kg
World Championships
Gold medal – first place	1985 Sodertelje	110 kg
Gold medal – first place	1986 Sofia	110 kg
Gold medal – first place	1987 Ostrava	110 kg
Silver medal – second place	1981 Lille	90 kg
Silver medal – second place	1982 Ljubljana	100 kg
European Championships
Gold medal – first place	1984 Vittorio	110 kg
Gold medal – first place	1985 Katowice	110 kg
Gold medal – first place	1986 Karl-Marx-Stadt	110 kg
Gold medal – first place	1987 Reims	110 kg
Gold medal – first place	1988 Cardiff	110 kg
Silver medal – second place	1981 Lille	90 kg
Silver medal – second place	1982 Ljubljana	100 kg
Silver medal – second place	1990 Aalborg	110 kg

Yury Ivanovich Zakharevich (Russian: Юрий Иванович Захаревич, born January 18, 1963) is a Russian retired weightlifter who competed for the Soviet Union. He trained at Dynamo in Dimitrovgrad. Yury competed in the middle-heavyweight (90 kg), sub-heavyweight (100 kg) and heavyweight (110 kg) weight classes during his career.

Yury Zakharevich has been described as one of the most technically gifted weightlifters of all time. In his analysis of the snatch technique of Yury Zakharevich, the biomechanist Robert Roman said that "Zakharevich raised the barbell in the snatch to "the minimal possible height of the lift lifters of his height can raise a barbell and still successfully fix it overhead."

== Weightlifting achievements ==
- Olympic champion (1988);
- Senior world champion (1985–1987);
- Silver medalist in Senior World Championships (1981 & 1982);
- European champion (1984–1988);
- Silver medalist in European Championships (1981, 1982, & 1990);
- Set 36 world records during career.

== Career bests ==
- Snatch: 210.0 kg in the class to 110 kg;
- Clean and jerk: 250.5 kg 1988 on Cardiff in the class to 110 kg;
- Total: 440.0 kg (200.0 + 240.0) 1983 on Odessa in the class to 100 kg;
- Total: 455.0 kg (210.0 + 245.0) 1988 Summer Olympics in the class to 110 kg.

== Major results ==
Year	Venue	Weight	Snatch (kg)				Clean & Jerk (kg)				Total	Rank
Year	Venue	Weight	1	2	3	Rank	1	2	3	Rank	Total	Rank
Olympic Games
1988	Seoul, South Korea	110 kg	195.0	205.0 WR	210.0 WR	1	245.0	~~251.0~~	~~251.0~~	1	455.0 WR	1st place, gold medalist(s)
World Championships
1986	Sofia, Bulgaria	110 kg	195.0	~~201.0~~	201.0 WR	1st place, gold medalist(s)	235.0	245.0	248.0 WR	1st place, gold medalist(s)	447.5 WR	1st place, gold medalist(s)
1987	Ostrava, Czechoslovakia	110 kg	195.0	203.0 WR	--	1st place, gold medalist(s)	235.0	242.5	~~248.5~~	1st place, gold medalist(s)	445	1st place, gold medalist(s)

== World records ==
- 3/21/1981 Snatch 181 kg Middle Heavyweight Lvov
- 3/21/1981 Snatch 182 kg Middle Heavyweight Lvov
- 6/20/1981 Snatch 183.5 kg Middle Heavyweight Lignano-Sabbiadoro
- 6/20/1981 Total 405 kg Middle Heavyweight Lignano-Sabbiadoro
- 12/21/1981 Clean & Jerk 232.5 kg Sub Heavyweight Donetsk
- 12/24/1981 Snatch 188 kg Sub Heavyweight Donetsk
- 12/24/1981 Snatch 192.5 kg Sub Heavyweight Donetsk
- 12/24/1981 Total 417.5 kg Sub Heavyweight Donetsk
- 12/24/1981 Total 425 kg Sub Heavyweight Donetsk
- 5/22/1982 Snatch 193.5 kg Sub Heavyweight Dnipropetrovsk
- 5/22/1982 Snatch 195 kg Sub Heavyweight Dnipropetrovsk
- 5/22/1982 Clean & Jerk 234 kg Sub Heavyweight Dnipropetrovsk
- 5/22/1982 Clean & Jerk 235 kg Sub Heavyweight Dnipropetrovsk
- 5/22/1982 Total 427.5 kg Sub Heavyweight Dnipropetrovsk
- 5/22/1982 Total 430 kg Sub Heavyweight Dnipropetrovsk
- 9/25/1982 Snatch 195.5 kg Sub Heavyweight Ljubljana
- 11/3/1982 Snatch 195.5 kg Heavyweight Haskovo
- 3/4/1983 Snatch 200 kg Sub Heavyweight Odessa
- 3/4/1983 Clean & Jerk 240 kg Sub Heavyweight Odessa
- 3/4/1983 Total 432.5 kg Sub Heavyweight Odessa
- 3/4/1983 Total 440 kg Sub Heavyweight Odessa
- 9/16/1984 Snatch 197.5 kg Heavyweight Varna
- 9/16/1984 Snatch 200.5 kg Heavyweight Varna
- 11/15/1986 Snatch 201 kg Heavyweight Sofia
- 11/15/1986 Clean & Jerk 248 kg Heavyweight Sofia
- 11/15/1986 Total 445 kg Heavyweight Sofia
- 11/15/1986 Total 447.5 kg Heavyweight Sofia
- 5/9/1987 Snatch 202.5 kg Heavyweight Reims
- 9/13/1987 Snatch 203 kg Heavyweight Ostrava
- 4/30/1988 Snatch 203.5 kg Heavyweight Cardiff
- 4/30/1988 Clean & Jerk 250.5 kg Heavyweight Cardiff
- 4/30/1988 Total 450 kg Heavyweight Cardiff
- 4/30/1988 Total 452.5 kg Heavyweight Cardiff
- 9/27/1988 Snatch 205 kg Heavyweight Seoul
- 9/27/1988 Snatch 210 kg Heavyweight Seoul
- 9/27/1988 Total 455 kg Heavyweight Seoul
