= Aleksandar Varbanov =

Bulgarian weightlifter (born 1964)

Personal information
- Born: May 9, 1964 (age 62) Novi Pazar, Bulgaria
Medal record
Men's Olympic weightlifting
Representing Bulgaria
Olympic Games
Bronze medal – third place	1988 Seoul	-75 kg
World Championships
Gold medal – first place	1983 Moscow	-75 kg
Gold medal – first place	1985 Sodertelje	-75 kg
Gold medal – first place	1986 Sofia	-75 kg
Silver medal – second place	1987 Ostrava	-75 kg
European Championships
Gold medal – first place	1983 Moscow	-75 kg
Gold medal – first place	1985 Katowice	-75 kg
Gold medal – first place	1986 Karl-Marx-Stadt	-75 kg
Gold medal – first place	1987 Reims	-75 kg
Silver medal – second place	1984 Vittorio	-75 kg
Silver medal – second place	1989 Athens	-75 kg
Friendship Games
Silver medal – second place	1984 Varna	-67,5 kg
IWF World Cup Final
Silver medal – second place	1985 Monte-Carlo	-75 kg
Silver medal – second place	1987 Seoul	-75 kg
Bronze medal – third place	1986 Melbourne	-75 kg
IWF World Cup
Gold medal – first place	1982 Varna	-67,5 kg
Gold medal – first place	1983 Varna	-75 kg
Gold medal – first place	1984 Varna	-75 kg
Gold medal – first place	1984 Budapest	-75 kg
Gold medal – first place	1985 Zalaegerszeg	-75 kg
Gold medal – first place	1986 Budapest	-75 kg
Gold medal – first place	1986 Dobrich	-75 kg
Gold medal – first place	1987 Budapest	-75 kg
Gold medal – first place	1988 Plovdiv	-75 kg
IWF World Cup Overall
Bronze medal – third place	1985 Monte-Carlo	-75 kg
Bronze medal – third place	1986 Melbourne	-75 kg
Silver medal – second place	1987 Seoul	-75 kg
Australia Games
Gold medal – first place	1985 Melbourne	-75 kg
Junior World Championships
Silver medal – second place	1981 Lignano Sabbiadoro	-60 kg
European Junior Championships
Silver medal – second place	1981 Lignano Sabbiadoro	-60 kg
Gold medal – first place	1982 Haskovo	-67,5 kg
Balkan Weightlifting Championships
Gold medal – first place	1981 Bistrița	-67,5 kg
Gold medal – first place	1982 Ankara	-67,5 kg
Gold medal – first place	1985 Plovdiv	-75 kg
Danube Cup
Gold medal – first place	1987 Budapest	-75 kg
Gold medal – first place	1989 Donaueschingen	-75 kg
Danube Junior Cup
Silver medal – second place	1980 Gyor	-60 kg
Friendship Junior Cup
Bronze medal – third place	1980 Minsk	-60 kg
Silver medal – second place	1981 Camaguey	-67,5 kg
Bulgarian Weightlifting Championships
Gold medal – first place	1982 Varna	-67,5 kg
Gold medal – first place	1983 Varna	-75 kg
Gold medal – first place	1984 Varna	-75 kg
Gold medal – first place	1985 Sliven	-82,5 kg
Silver medal – second place	1989 Dobrich	-75 kg
Bulgaria Team Championships
Gold medal – first place	1982 Kardzhali	-75 kg
Gold medal – first place	1982 Pleven	-67,5 kg
Gold medal – first place	1983 Varna	-75 kg
Bulgarian Junior&Youth Weightlifting Championships
Gold medal – first place	1983 Varna	-75 kg
Gold medal – first place	1982 Pazardzhik	-75 kg
Gold medal – first place	1981 Silistra	-60 kg
Gold medal – first place	1980 Plovdiv	-60 kg
Gold medal – first place	1979 Plovdiv	-52 kg

Aleksandar Varbanov (Bulgarian: Александър Върбанов; born May 9, 1964) was a weightlifter for Bulgaria. Alexander has the 9th highest Sinclair ever of 485.78 made up of a 167.5 kg snatch and a 215 kg clean and jerk at under 75 kg in body weight. He earned 10 official world records two still current to this date, 215.5 kg Clean and Jerk and 382.5 kg Total.

== Weightlifting achievements ==
- Bronze medalist in Olympic Games (1988);
- Senior world champion (1983, 1985 and 1986);
- Silver medalist in Senior World Championships (1987);
- Senior European champion (1983, 1985, 1986 and 1987);
- Silver medalist at Senior European Championships (1984 and 1989);
- Silver medalist of the 1984 Friendship Games;
- Silver medalist of the 1985 and 1987 World cup finals;
- Bronze medalist of the 1986 World cup final;
- Third place in the final standings of the World Cup 1985 and 1986
- Second place in the final standings of the World Cup 1987
- Gold medalist of the World Cup tournaments Varna 1982, Varna 1983, Varna 1984, Dobrich 1986, Plovdiv 1988;
- Junior World vice-champion (1981);
- European Junior champion (1982);
- European Junior vice-champion (1981);
- Balkan champion 1982, 1983 and 1985
- Four-time champion of Bulgaria (1982, 1983, 1984, 1985);
- Five times Junior and Youth champion of Bulgaria (1979, 1980, 1981, 1982, 1983);
- Set ten world records during his career.

== Career bests ==
- Clean and jerk: 200.0 kg on September 13, 1984, in Varna in class to 67.5 kg.
- Clean and jerk: 215.5 kg on May 12, 1987, in Seoul in the class to 75 kg.
- Total (snatch + clean and jerk): 382.5 kg on February 20, 1988, in Plovdiv in the class to 75 kg.
