= Israil Arsamakov =

Soviet weightlifter (born 1962)

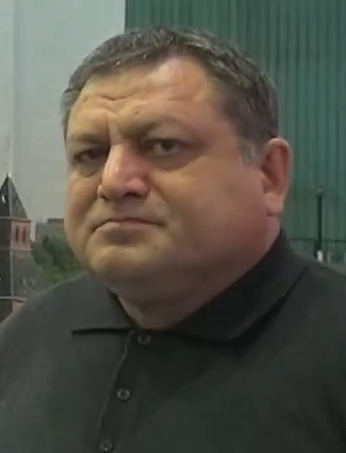

Medal record

Men's weightlifting

Representing the Soviet Union

Olympic Games
Gold medal – first place	1988 Seoul	-82.5 kg

Israil Magomedgireyevich Arsamakov (Russian: Исраил Магомедгиреевич Арсамаков; born 8 February 1962 in Grozny, Chechen–Ingush ASSR) is a Russian retired weightlifter of Ingush descent and Olympic champion who competed for the Soviet Union.

Arsamakov won a gold medal at the 1988 Summer Olympics in Seoul.
