= 1989 European Weightlifting Championships =

International weightlifting competition

1989 European Championships

The 1989 European Weightlifting Championships were held in Athens, Greece from September 16 to September 23, 1989. This was the 68th edition of the event. There were 136 men in action from 23 nations. This tournament was a part of 1989 World Weightlifting Championships. The women competition were held in Manchester, United Kingdom. It was the 2nd event for the women.

== Medal summary ==
=== Men ===
Event	Gold		Silver		Bronze	
52 kg
Snatch	Ivan Ivanov; Bulgaria	117.5 kg	Traian Cihărean; Romania	115.0 kg	José Luis Martínez; Spain	102.5 kg
Clean & Jerk	Ivan Ivanov; Bulgaria	155.0 kg WR	Traian Cihărean; Romania	145.0 kg	Agron Haxhiyseni; Albania	125.0 kg
Total	Ivan Ivanov; Bulgaria	272.5 kg WR	Traian Cihărean; Romania	260.0 kg	José Luis Martínez; Spain	227.5 kg
56 kg
Snatch	Hafiz Suleymanov; Soviet Union	130.0 kg	Sevdalin Marinov; Bulgaria	125.0 kg	Luan Shabani; Albania	120.0 kg
Clean & Jerk	Hafiz Suleymanov; Soviet Union	157.5 kg	Sevdalin Marinov; Bulgaria	155.0 kg	Laurent Fombertasse; France	140.0 kg
Total	Hafiz Suleymanov; Soviet Union	287.5 kg	Sevdalin Marinov; Bulgaria	280.0 kg	Luan Shabani; Albania	260.0 kg
60 kg
Snatch	Naim Süleymanoğlu; Turkey	145.0 kg	Attila Czanka; Romania	137.5 kg	Nikolay Peshalov; Bulgaria	137.5 kg
Clean & Jerk	Naim Süleymanoğlu; Turkey	172.5 kg	Nikolay Peshalov; Bulgaria	170.0 kg	Attila Czanka; Romania	167.5 kg
Total	Naim Süleymanoğlu; Turkey	317.5 kg	Nikolay Peshalov; Bulgaria	307.5 kg	Attila Czanka; Romania	305.0 kg
67.5 kg
Snatch	Israel Militosyan; Soviet Union	160.0 kg WR	Yoto Yotov; Bulgaria	155.0 kg	Ergün Batmaz; Turkey	147.5 kg
Clean & Jerk	Israel Militosyan; Soviet Union	187.5 kg	Yoto Yotov; Bulgaria	182.5 kg	Andreas Behm; East Germany	182.5 kg
Total	Israel Militosyan; Soviet Union	347.5 kg	Yoto Yotov; Bulgaria	337.5 kg	Andreas Behm; East Germany	325.0 kg
75 kg
Snatch	Altimurat Orazdurdiev; Soviet Union	160.0 kg	Waldemar Kosiński; Poland	155.0 kg	Andrei Socaci; Romania	155.0 kg
Clean & Jerk	Altimurat Orazdurdiev; Soviet Union	202.5 kg	Aleksandar Varbanov; Bulgaria	200.0 kg	Waldemar Kosiński; Poland	190.0 kg
Total	Altimurat Orazdurdiev; Soviet Union	362.5 kg	Aleksandar Varbanov; Bulgaria	350.0 kg	Waldemar Kosiński; Poland	345.0 kg
82.5 kg
Snatch	Kiril Kounev; Bulgaria	172.5 kg	Ingo Steinhöfel; East Germany	170.0 kg	Sergey Li; Soviet Union	170.0 kg
Clean & Jerk	Kiril Kounev; Bulgaria	212.5 kg	Plamen Bratoychev; Bulgaria	210.0 kg	Ingo Steinhöfel; East Germany	207.5 kg
Total	Kiril Kounev; Bulgaria	385.0 kg	Plamen Bratoychev; Bulgaria	380.0 kg	Ingo Steinhöfel; East Germany	377.5 kg
90 kg
Snatch	Sergey Syrtsov; Soviet Union	185.0 kg	Anatoly Khrapaty; Soviet Union	185.0 kg	Ivan Chakarov; Bulgaria	180.0 kg
Clean & Jerk	Anatoly Khrapaty; Soviet Union	230.0 kg	Sergey Syrtsov; Soviet Union	222.5 kg	Ivan Chakarov; Bulgaria	220.0 kg
Total	Anatoly Khrapaty; Soviet Union	415.0 kg	Sergey Syrtsov; Soviet Union	407.5 kg	Ivan Chakarov; Bulgaria	400.0 kg
100 kg
Snatch	Nicu Vlad; Romania	190.0 kg	Petar Stefanov; Bulgaria	187.5 kg	Pavel Kuznetsov; Soviet Union	180.0 kg
Clean & Jerk	Petar Stefanov; Bulgaria	227.5 kg	Udo Guse; East Germany	222.5 kg	Nicu Vlad; Romania	222.5 kg
Total	Petar Stefanov; Bulgaria	415.0 kg	Nicu Vlad; Romania	412.5 kg	Pavel Kuznetsov; Soviet Union	400.0 kg
110 kg
Snatch	Ronny Weller; East Germany	202.5 kg	Yury Zakharevich; Soviet Union	202.5 kg	Andrew Davies; Great Britain	185.0 kg
Clean & Jerk	Stefan Botev; Bulgaria	242.5 kg	Mirosław Dąbrowski; Poland	212.5 kg	Andrew Davies; Great Britain	210.0 kg
Total	Stefan Botev; Bulgaria	427.5 kg	Andrew Davies; Great Britain	395.0 kg	Mirosław Dąbrowski; Poland	382.5 kg
+110 kg
Snatch	Aleksandr Kurlovich; Soviet Union	215.0 kg	Rizvan Geliskhanov; Soviet Union	200.0 kg	Michael Schubert; East Germany	195.0 kg
Clean & Jerk	Aleksandr Kurlovich; Soviet Union	245.0 kg	Manfred Nerlinger; West Germany	242.5 kg	Rizvan Geliskhanov; Soviet Union	232.5 kg
Total	Aleksandr Kurlovich; Soviet Union	460.0 kg	Rizvan Geliskhanov; Soviet Union	432.5 kg	Michael Schubert; East Germany	425.0 kg

=== Women ===
See Mistrzostwa Europy Kobiet w Podnoszeniu Ciężarów 1989 on Polish Wikipedia.

== Medal table ==
Ranking by Big (Total result) medals

Rank	Nation	Gold	Silver	Bronze	Total
1	Soviet Union (URS)	5	2	1	8
2	Bulgaria (BUL)	4	5	1	10
3	Turkey (TUR)	1	0	0	1
4	Romania (ROU)	0	2	1	3
5	Great Britain (GBR)	0	1	0	1
6	East Germany (GDR)	0	0	3	3
7	Poland (POL)	0	0	2	2
8	Albania (ALB)	0	0	1	1
8	Spain (ESP)	0	0	1	1
Totals (9 entries)		10	10	10	30
