= 1991 European Weightlifting Championships =

International weightlifting competition

1991 European Championships

The 1991 European Weightlifting Championships were held in Władysławowo, Poland from May 24 to May 31, 1991. It was the 70th edition of the event. There were a total number of 127 athletes competing, from 21 nations. The women competition were held in Varna, Bulgaria. It was the 4th event for the women.

== Medal summary ==
=== Men ===
Event	Gold		Silver		Bronze	
52 kg
Snatch	Traian Cihărean; Romania	115.0 kg	Sevdalin Minchev; Bulgaria	110.0 kg	Halil Mutlu; Turkey	105.0 kg
Clean & Jerk	Sevdalin Minchev; Bulgaria	142.5 kg	Traian Cihărean; Romania	140.0 kg	Halil Mutlu; Turkey	135.0 kg
Total	Traian Cihărean; Romania	255.0 kg	Sevdalin Minchev; Bulgaria	252.5 kg	Halil Mutlu; Turkey	240.0 kg
56 kg
Snatch	Viktor Sinyak; Soviet Union	125.0 kg	Hafız Süleymanoğlu; Turkey	125.0 kg	Ferenc Lenart; Hungary	117.5 kg
Clean & Jerk	Ivan Ivanov; Bulgaria	150.0 kg	Hafız Süleymanoğlu; Turkey	147.5 kg	Marek Gorzelniak; Poland	145.0 kg
Total	Hafız Süleymanoğlu; Turkey	272.5 kg	Viktor Sinyak; Soviet Union	270.0 kg	Ivan Ivanov; Bulgaria	265.0 kg
60 kg
Snatch	Nikolay Peshalov; Bulgaria	137.5 kg	Attila Czanka; Hungary	130.0 kg	Yurik Sarkisyan; Soviet Union	130.0 kg
Clean & Jerk	Nikolay Peshalov; Bulgaria	165.0 kg	Yurik Sarkisyan; Soviet Union	160.0 kg	Attila Czanka; Hungary	157.5 kg
Total	Nikolay Peshalov; Bulgaria	302.5 kg	Yurik Sarkisyan; Soviet Union	290.0 kg	Attila Czanka; Hungary	287.5 kg
67.5 kg
Snatch	Yoto Yotov; Bulgaria	155.0 kg	Israel Militosyan; Soviet Union	152.5 kg	Ergün Batmaz; Turkey	142.5 kg
Clean & Jerk	Israel Militosyan; Soviet Union	185.0 kg	Yoto Yotov; Bulgaria	185.0 kg	Andreas Behm; Germany	180.0 kg
Total	Yoto Yotov; Bulgaria	340.0 kg	Israel Militosyan; Soviet Union	337.5 kg	Andreas Behm; Germany	317.5 kg
75 kg
Snatch	Andrei Socaci; Romania	157.5 kg	Fedor Kassapu; Soviet Union	152.5 kg	Andrzej Cofalik; Poland	152.5 kg
Clean & Jerk	Rumen Stoyanov; Bulgaria	195.0 kg	Fedor Kassapu; Soviet Union	192.5 kg	Andrei Socaci; Romania	192.5 kg
Total	Andrei Socaci; Romania	350.0 kg	Rumen Stoyanov; Bulgaria	345.0 kg	Fedor Kassapu; Soviet Union	345.0 kg
82.5 kg
Snatch	Altimurat Orazdurdiev; Soviet Union	172.5 kg	Plamen Bratoychev; Bulgaria	165.0 kg	Krzysztof Siemion; Poland	160.0 kg
Clean & Jerk	Altimurat Orazdurdiev; Soviet Union	202.5 kg	Sunay Bulut; Turkey	200.0 kg	Włodzimierz Chlebosz; Poland	197.5 kg
Total	Altimurat Orazdurdiev; Soviet Union	375.0 kg	Plamen Bratoychev; Bulgaria	360.0 kg	Sunay Bulut; Turkey	360.0 kg
90 kg
Snatch	Ivan Chakarov; Bulgaria	180.0 kg	Slawomir Zawada; Poland	177.5 kg	Ali Eroglu; Turkey	162.5 kg
Clean & Jerk	Ivan Chakarov; Bulgaria	210.0 kg	Slawomir Zawada; Poland	210.0 kg	Ali Eroglu; Turkey	192.5 kg
Total	Ivan Chakarov; Bulgaria	390.0 kg	Slawomir Zawada; Poland	387.5 kg	Ali Eroglu; Turkey	355.0 kg
100 kg
Snatch	Igor Sadykov; Soviet Union	185.0 kg	Viktor Tregubov; Soviet Union	180.0 kg	Petar Stefanov; Bulgaria	170.0 kg
Clean & Jerk	Igor Sadykov; Soviet Union	220.0 kg	Viktor Tregubov; Soviet Union	212.5 kg	Udo Guse; Germany	207.5 kg
Total	Igor Sadykov; Soviet Union	405.0 kg	Viktor Tregubov; Soviet Union	392.5 kg	Petar Stefanov; Bulgaria	372.5 kg
110 kg
Snatch	Artur Akoyev; Soviet Union	185.0 kg	Piotr Banaszak; Poland	182.5 kg	Andrew Davies; Great Britain	167.5 kg
Clean & Jerk	Artur Akoyev; Soviet Union	235.0 kg	Piotr Banaszak; Poland	210.0 kg	Andor Szanyi; Hungary	207.5 kg
Total	Artur Akoyev; Soviet Union	420.0 kg	Piotr Banaszak; Poland	392.5 kg	Andor Szanyi; Hungary	372.5 kg
+110 kg
Snatch	Leonid Taranenko; Soviet Union	200.0 kg	Sergey Gunyashev; Soviet Union	190.0 kg	Kolio Kolev; Bulgaria	185.0 kg
Clean & Jerk	Leonid Taranenko; Soviet Union	247.5 kg	Manfred Nerlinger; West Germany	237.5 kg	Jiri Zubricky; Czechoslovakia	232.5 kg
Total	Leonid Taranenko; Soviet Union	447.5 kg	Manfred Nerlinger; West Germany	422.5 kg	Sergey Gunyashev; Soviet Union	415.0 kg

== Medal table ==
Ranking by Big (Total result) medals

Rank	Nation	Gold	Silver	Bronze	Total
1	Soviet Union (URS)	4	4	2	10
2	Bulgaria (BUL)	3	3	2	8
3	Romania (ROU)	2	0	0	2
4	Turkey (TUR)	1	0	3	4
5	Poland (POL)	0	2	0	2
6	Germany (GER)	0	1	1	2
7	Hungary (HUN)	0	0	2	2
Totals (7 entries)		10	10	10	30
