= 1993 European Weightlifting Championships =

International weightlifting competition

1993 European Championships

The 1993 European Weightlifting Championships were held in Sofia, Bulgaria from April 20 to April 25, 1993. It was the 72nd edition of the men's event. There were a total number of 153 athletes competing, from 27 nations. The women competition were held in Valencia, Spain. It was the 6th event for the women.

== Medal overview ==
=== Men ===
Event		Gold		Silver		Bronze	
– 54 kg	Snatch	(Bulgaria) Sevdalin Minchev	122.5 kg	(Romania) Traian Cihărean	117.5 kg	(Bulgaria) Ivan Ivanov	115 kg
– 54 kg	Clean & Jerk	(Bulgaria) Ivan Ivanov	157.5 kg	(Bulgaria) Sevdalin Minchev	150 kg	(Italy) Giovanni Scarantino	132.5 kg
– 54 kg	Total	(Bulgaria) Ivan Ivanov	272.5 kg	(Bulgaria) Sevdalin Minchev	272.5 kg	(Russia) Nikolay Petukhov	240 kg
– 59 kg	Snatch	(Bulgaria) Nikolay Peshalov	137.5 kg	(Turkey) Hafız Süleymanoğlu	130 kg	(Belarus) Viktor Kharithonchik	127.5 kg
– 59 kg	Clean & Jerk	(Ukraine) Albert Nassibullin	160 kg	(Turkey) Hafız Süleymanoğlu	160 kg	(Romania) Aurel Sîrbu	157.5 kg
– 59 kg	Total	(Bulgaria) Nikolay Peshalov	295 kg	(Turkey) Hafız Süleymanoğlu	290 kg	(Ukraine) Albert Nassibullin	282.5 kg
– 64 kg	Snatch	(Hungary) Attila Czanka	145 kg	(Bulgaria) Radostin Dimitrov	142.5 kg	(Armenia) Eduard Darbinyan	140 kg
– 64 kg	Clean & Jerk	(Greece) Valerios Leonidis	175 kg	(Hungary) Attila Czanka	170 kg	(Armenia) Eduard Darbinyan	167.5 kg
– 64 kg	Total	(Hungary) Attila Czanka	315 kg	(Greece) Valerios Leonidis	312.5 kg	(Bulgaria) Radostin Dimitrov	310 kg
– 70 kg	Snatch	(Poland) Waldemar Kosiński	155 kg	(Bulgaria) Yoto Yotov	152.5 kg	(Turkey) Ergun Batmaz	150 kg
– 70 kg	Clean & Jerk	(Bulgaria) Yoto Yotov	190 kg	(Germany) Andreas Behm	185 kg	(Russia) Ramzan Musayev	185 kg
– 70 kg	Total	(Bulgaria) Yoto Yotov	342.5 kg	(Poland) Waldemar Kosiński	335 kg	(Russia) Ramzan Musayev	335 kg
– 76 kg	Snatch	(Russia) Aslanbek Ediev	167.5 kg	(Armenia) Khachatur Kyapanaktsyan	165 kg	(Belarus) Leonid Lobachev	162.5 kg
– 76 kg	Clean & Jerk	(Poland) Andrzej Kozłowski	200 kg	(Armenia) Khachatur Kyapanaktsyan	197.5 kg	(Ukraine) Ruslan Savchenko	197.5 kg
– 76 kg	Total	(Armenia) Khachatur Kyapanaktsyan	362.5 kg	(Belarus) Oleg Kechko	360 kg	(Poland) Andrzej Kozłowski	360 kg
– 83 kg	Snatch	(Ukraine) Oleksandr Blyshchyk	175 kg	(Greece) Pyrros Dimas	170 kg	(Bulgaria) Plamen Bratoychev	170 kg
– 83 kg	Clean & Jerk	(Poland) Krzysztof Siemion	207.5 kg	(Turkey) Sunay Bulut	207.5 kg	(Ukraine) Oleksandr Blyshchyk	205 kg
– 83 kg	Total	(Ukraine) Oleksandr Blyshchyk	380 kg	(Poland) Krzysztof Siemion	372.5 kg	(Greece) Pyrros Dimas	370 kg
– 91 kg	Snatch	(Georgia (country)) Kakhi Kakhiashvili	180 kg	(Bulgaria) Ivan Chakarov	180 kg	(Russia) Igor Alekseyev	175 kg
– 91 kg	Clean & Jerk	(Georgia (country)) Kakhi Kakhiashvili	222.5 kg	(Poland) Sergiusz Wołczaniecki	220 kg	(Armenia) Aleksander Karapetyan	210 kg
– 91 kg	Total	(Georgia (country)) Kakhi Kakhiashvili	402.5 kg	(Poland) Sergiusz Wołczaniecki	390 kg	(Bulgaria) Ivan Chakarov	390 kg
– 99 kg	Snatch	(Russia) Vyacheslav Rubin	185 kg	(Poland) Sławomir Zawada	185 kg	(Ukraine) Volodimir Garbar	180 kg
– 99 kg	Clean & Jerk	(Russia) Vyacheslav Rubin	220 kg	(Poland) Sławomir Zawada	220 kg	(Belarus) Oleg Chiritso	217.5 kg
– 99 kg	Total	(Russia) Vyacheslav Rubin	405 kg	(Poland) Sławomir Zawada	405 kg	(Belarus) Oleg Chiritso	395 kg
– 108 kg	Snatch	(Russia) Igor Katchurin	197.5 kg	(Ukraine) Timur Taymazov	195 kg	(Germany) Ronny Weller	185 kg
– 108 kg	Clean & Jerk	(Russia) Aleksandr Popov	235 kg	(Germany) Ronny Weller	235 kg	(Ukraine) Timur Taymazov	232.5 kg
– 108 kg	Total	(Ukraine) Timur Taymazov	427.5 kg	(Germany) Ronny Weller	420 kg	(Russia) Aleksandr Popov	417.5 kg
+ 108 kg	Snatch	(Ukraine) Aleksander Levandovski	197.5 kg	(Russia) Artur Skripkin	195 kg	(Romania) Constantin Udrea	187.5 kg
+ 108 kg	Clean & Jerk	(Russia) Andrei Chemerkin	240 kg	(Germany) Manfred Nerlinger	240 kg	(Belarus) Alexei Krusevich	232.5 kg
+ 108 kg	Total	(Germany) Manfred Nerlinger	427.5 kg	(Russia) Andrei Chemerkin	425 kg	(Ukraine) Aleksander Levandovski	422.5 kg

== Medals tables ==
Ranking by "Big" (Total result) medals

Host nation

Place	Nation	1st place, gold medalist(s)	2nd place, silver medalist(s)	3rd place, bronze medalist(s)	Total
1	Bulgaria	3	1	2	6
2	Ukraine	2	0	2	4
3	Russia	1	1	3	5
4	Germany	1	1	0	2
5	Armenia	1	0	0	1
5	Georgia	1	0	0	1
5	Hungary	1	0	0	1
8	Poland	0	4	1	5
9	Belarus	0	1	1	2
9	Greece	0	1	1	2
11	Turkey	0	1	0	1
Total		10	10	10	30
