= 1990 European Weightlifting Championships =

International weightlifting competition

1990 European Championships

The 1990 European Weightlifting Championships were held in Ålborg, Denmark from May 14 to May 20, 1990. It was the 69th edition of the event. There were a total number of 126 athletes competing, from 23 nations. The women competition were held in Santa Cruz de Tenerife, Spain. It was the 3rd event for the women.

== Medal summary ==
=== Men ===
| Event | Gold | | Silver | | Bronze | |
52 kg
| Snatch | Traian Cihărean; Romania | 115.0 kg | Ivan Ivanov; Bulgaria | 115.0 kg | Jacek Gutowski; Poland | 105.0 kg |
| Clean & Jerk | Ivan Ivanov; Bulgaria | 150.0 kg | Traian Cihărean; Romania | 132.5 kg | Jacek Gutowski; Poland | 132.5 kg |
| Total | Ivan Ivanov; Bulgaria | 265.0 kg | Traian Cihărean; Romania | 247.5 kg | Jacek Gutowski; Poland | 237.5 kg |
56 kg
| Snatch | Sevdalin Marinov; Bulgaria | 120.0 kg | Marek Gorzelniak; Poland | 115.0 kg | Laurent Fombertasse; France | 110.0 kg |
| Clean & Jerk | Sevdalin Marinov; Bulgaria | 145.0 kg | Laurent Fombertasse; France | 142.5 kg | Marek Gorzelniak; Poland | 140.0 kg |
| Total | Sevdalin Marinov; Bulgaria | 265.0 kg | Marek Gorzelniak; Poland | 255.0 kg | Laurent Fombertasse; France | 252.5 kg |
60 kg
| Snatch | Attila Czanka; Romania | 140.0 kg | Nikolay Peshalov; Bulgaria | 132.5 kg | Artur Duraj; Albania | 122.5 kg |
| Clean & Jerk | Attila Czanka; Romania | 170.0 kg | Nikolay Peshalov; Bulgaria | 155.0 kg | Artur Duraj; Albania | 147.5 kg |
| Total | Attila Czanka; Romania | 310.0 kg | Nikolay Peshalov; Bulgaria | 287.5 kg | Artur Duraj; Albania | 270.0 kg |
67.5 kg
| Snatch | Yoto Yotov; Bulgaria | 155.0 kg | Israel Militosyan; Soviet Union | 155.0 kg | Bogdan Bakula; Poland | 142.5 kg |
| Clean & Jerk | Yoto Yotov; Bulgaria | 185.0 kg | Israel Militosyan; Soviet Union | 180.0 kg | Attila Feri; Romania | 175.0 kg |
| Total | Yoto Yotov; Bulgaria | 340.0 kg | Israel Militosyan; Soviet Union | 335.0 kg | Ergün Batmaz; Turkey | 315.0 kg |
75 kg
| Snatch | Vladimir Kuznetsov; Soviet Union | 162.5 kg | Waldemar Kosiński; Poland | 160.0 kg | Andrei Socaci; Romania | 160.0 kg |
| Clean & Jerk | Vladimir Kuznetsov; Soviet Union | 197.5 kg | Waldemar Kosiński; Poland | 195.0 kg | Nicolae Niţu; Romania | 192.5 kg |
| Total | Vladimir Kuznetsov; Soviet Union | 360.0 kg | Waldemar Kosiński; Poland | 355.0 kg | Andrei Socaci; Romania | 352.5 kg |
82.5 kg
| Snatch | Altimurat Orazdurdiev; Soviet Union | 172.5 kg | Kiril Kounev; Bulgaria | 170.0 kg | Krzysztof Siemion; Poland | 167.5 kg |
| Clean & Jerk | Altimurat Orazdurdiev; Soviet Union | 205.0 kg | Krzysztof Siemion; Poland | 200.0 kg | Kiril Kounev; Bulgaria | 200.0 kg |
| Total | Altimurat Orazdurdiev; Soviet Union | 377.5 kg | Kiril Kounev; Bulgaria | 370.0 kg | Krzysztof Siemion; Poland | 367.5 kg |
90 kg
| Snatch | Slawomir Zawada; Poland | 185.0 kg | Anatoly Khrapaty; Soviet Union | 182.5 kg | Ivan Chakarov; Bulgaria | 180.0 kg |
| Clean & Jerk | Anatoly Khrapaty; Soviet Union | 220.0 kg | Ivan Chakarov; Bulgaria | 215.0 kg | Slawomir Zawada; Poland | 215.0 kg |
| Total | Anatoly Khrapaty; Soviet Union | 402.5 kg | Slawomir Zawada; Poland | 400.0 kg | Ivan Chakarov; Bulgaria | 395.0 kg |
100 kg
| Snatch | Nicu Vlad; Romania | 192.5 kg | Sergey Kopytov; Soviet Union | 185.0 kg | Petar Stefanov; Bulgaria | 170.0 kg |
| Clean & Jerk | Sergey Kopytov; Soviet Union | 235.0 kg | Nicu Vlad; Romania | 227.5 kg | Francis Tournefier; France | 220.0 kg |
| Total | Sergey Kopytov; Soviet Union | 420.0 kg | Nicu Vlad; Romania | 420.0 kg | Francis Tournefier; France | 385.0 kg |
110 kg
| Snatch | Rizvan Geliskhanov; Soviet Union | 202.5 kg | Yury Zakharevich; Soviet Union | 200.0 kg | Stefan Botev; Bulgaria | 195.0 kg |
| Clean & Jerk | Stefan Botev; Bulgaria | 250.0 kg | Yury Zakharevich; Soviet Union | 242.5 kg | Rizvan Geliskhanov; Soviet Union | 237.5 kg |
| Total | Stefan Botev; Bulgaria | 445.0 kg | Yury Zakharevich; Soviet Union | 442.5 kg | Rizvan Geliskhanov; Soviet Union | 440.0 kg |
+110 kg
| Snatch | Aleksandr Kurlovich; Soviet Union | 210.0 kg | Leonid Taranenko; Soviet Union | 205.0 kg | Manfred Nerlinger; West Germany | 197.5 kg |
| Clean & Jerk | Aleksandr Kurlovich; Soviet Union | 257.5 kg | Manfred Nerlinger; West Germany | 257.5 kg | Leonid Taranenko; Soviet Union | 247.5 kg |
| Total | Aleksandr Kurlovich; Soviet Union | 467.5 kg | Manfred Nerlinger; West Germany | 455.0 kg | Leonid Taranenko; Soviet Union | 452.5 kg |

=== Women ===
| Event | Gold | | Silver | | Bronze | |
44 kg
| Snatch | | | | | | |
| Clean & Jerk | | | | | | |
| Total | Csilla Földi; Hungary | 132.5 kg | Eulália Romão; Portugal | 115.0 kg | Ángeles Suárez; Spain | 115.0 kg |
48 kg
| Snatch | | | | | | |
| Clean & Jerk | | | | | | |
| Total | Dolores Sotoca; Spain | 135.0 kg | Sara Duarte; Portugal | 132.5 kg | Pepa Demireva; Bulgaria | 130.0 kg |
52 kg
| Snatch | | | | | | |
| Clean & Jerk | | | | | | |
| Total | Siyka Stoeva; Bulgaria | 152.5 kg | Pauline Haughton; Great Britain | 147.5 kg | Janeta Georgieva; Bulgaria | 147.5 kg |
56 kg
| Snatch | | | | | | |
| Clean & Jerk | | | | | | |
| Total | Neli Yankova; Bulgaria | 175.0 kg | Gergana Kirilova; Bulgaria | 162.5 kg | Sandra Gómez; Spain | 157.5 kg |
60 kg
| Snatch | | | | | | |
| Clean & Jerk | | | | | | |
| Total | Maria Christoforidou; Greece | 185.0 kg | Daniela Kerkelova; Bulgaria | 175.0 kg | Annette Campbell; Great Britain | 155.0 kg |
67.5 kg
| Snatch | | | | | | |
| Clean & Jerk | | | | | | |
| Total | Milena Trendafilova; Bulgaria | 215.0 kg | Jeanette Rose; Great Britain | 177.5 kg | María Dolores Martínez; Spain | 177.5 kg |
75 kg
| Snatch | | | | | | |
| Clean & Jerk | | | | | | |
| Total | Mária Takács; Hungary | 202.5 kg | Susanna Samuelsson; Finland | 190.0 kg | Theodoula Spanou; Greece | 187.5 kg |
82.5 kg
| Snatch | | | | | | |
| Clean & Jerk | | | | | | |
| Total | Judith Oakes; Great Britain | 200.0 kg | Valkana Tosheva; Bulgaria | 197.5 kg | Karoliina Leppäluoto; Finland | 175.0 kg |
+82.5 kg
| Snatch | | | | | | |
| Clean & Jerk | | | | | | |
| Total | Christina Ilieva; Bulgaria | 185.0 kg | Maggie Lynes; Great Britain | 175.0 kg | Veronika Tóbiás; Hungary | 170.0 kg |

== Medal table ==
Ranking by Big (Total result) medals

| Rank | Nation | Gold | Silver | Bronze | Total |
|---|---|---|---|---|---|
| 1 | Bulgaria | 8 | 5 | 3 | 16 |
| 2 | Soviet Union | 5 | 2 | 2 | 9 |
| 3 | Hungary | 2 | 0 | 1 | 3 |
| 4 | Great Britain | 1 | 3 | 1 | 5 |
| 5 | Romania | 1 | 2 | 1 | 4 |
| 6 | Spain | 1 | 0 | 3 | 4 |
| 7 | Greece | 1 | 0 | 1 | 2 |
| 8 | Poland | 0 | 3 | 2 | 5 |
| 9 | Portugal | 0 | 2 | 0 | 2 |
| 10 | Finland | 0 | 1 | 1 | 2 |
| 11 | West Germany | 0 | 1 | 0 | 1 |
| 12 | France | 0 | 0 | 2 | 2 |
| 13 | Albania | 0 | 0 | 1 | 1 |
| 13 | Turkey | 0 | 0 | 1 | 1 |
| Totals (14 entries) | | 19 | 19 | 19 | 57 |
