= 1989 World Weightlifting Championships =

International World Championships

1989 World Championships
- Host city: Athens, Greece and Manchester, United Kingdom
- Dates: Unknown

The following is the final results of the 1989 World Weightlifting Championships. Men's competition were held in Athens, Greece and Women's competition were held in Manchester, United Kingdom.

== Medal summary ==
=== Men ===
| Event | Gold | | Silver | | Bronze | |
52 kg
| Snatch | He Zhuoqiang; China | 117.5 kg | Ivan Ivanov; Bulgaria | 117.5 kg | Traian Cihărean; Romania | 115.0 kg |
| Clean & Jerk | Ivan Ivanov; Bulgaria | 155.0 kg WR | Traian Cihărean; Romania | 145.0 kg | He Zhuoqiang; China | 145.0 kg |
| Total | Ivan Ivanov; Bulgaria | 272.5 kg WR | He Zhuoqiang; China | 262.5 kg | Traian Cihărean; Romania | 260.0 kg |
56 kg
| Snatch | Liu Shoubin; China | 130.0 kg | Hafiz Suleymanov; Soviet Union | 130.0 kg | He Yingqiang; China | 125.0 kg |
| Clean & Jerk | Hafiz Suleymanov; Soviet Union | 157.5 kg | Chun Byung-kwan; South Korea | 155.0 kg | Liu Shoubin; China | 155.0 kg |
| Total | Hafiz Suleymanov; Soviet Union | 287.5 kg | Liu Shoubin; China | 285.0 kg | He Yingqiang; China | 280.0 kg |
60 kg
| Snatch | Naim Süleymanoğlu; Turkey | 145.0 kg | Attila Czanka; Romania | 137.5 kg | Ri Jae-son; North Korea | 137.5 kg |
| Clean & Jerk | Naim Süleymanoğlu; Turkey | 172.5 kg | Nikolay Peshalov; Bulgaria | 170.0 kg | Attila Czanka; Romania | 167.5 kg |
| Total | Naim Süleymanoğlu; Turkey | 317.5 kg | Nikolay Peshalov; Bulgaria | 307.5 kg | Attila Czanka; Romania | 305.0 kg |
67.5 kg
| Snatch | Israel Militosyan; Soviet Union | 160.0 kg WR | Yoto Yotov; Bulgaria | 155.0 kg | Kim Myong-nam; North Korea | 152.5 kg |
| Clean & Jerk | Israel Militosyan; Soviet Union | 187.5 kg | Andreas Behm; East Germany | 182.5 kg | Yoto Yotov; Bulgaria | 182.5 kg |
| Total | Israel Militosyan; Soviet Union | 347.5 kg | Yoto Yotov; Bulgaria | 337.5 kg | Kim Myong-nam; North Korea | 327.5 kg |
75 kg
| Snatch | Cai Yanshu; China | 160.0 kg | Altimurat Orazdurdiev; Soviet Union | 160.0 kg | Pablo Lara; Cuba | 157.5 kg |
| Clean & Jerk | Altimurat Orazdurdiev; Soviet Union | 202.5 kg | Jon Chol-ho; North Korea | 200.0 kg | Aleksandar Varbanov; Bulgaria | 200.0 kg |
| Total | Altimurat Orazdurdiev; Soviet Union | 362.5 kg | Pablo Lara; Cuba | 357.5 kg | Jon Chol-ho; North Korea | 355.0 kg |
82.5 kg
| Snatch | Kiril Kounev; Bulgaria | 172.5 kg | Ingo Steinhöfel; East Germany | 170.0 kg | Sergey Li; Soviet Union | 170.0 kg |
| Clean & Jerk | Kiril Kounev; Bulgaria | 212.5 kg | Plamen Bratoychev; Bulgaria | 210.0 kg | Ingo Steinhöfel; East Germany | 207.5 kg |
| Total | Kiril Kounev; Bulgaria | 385.0 kg | Plamen Bratoychev; Bulgaria | 380.0 kg | Ingo Steinhöfel; East Germany | 377.5 kg |
90 kg
| Snatch | Sergey Syrtsov; Soviet Union | 185.0 kg | Anatoly Khrapaty; Soviet Union | 185.0 kg | Ivan Chakarov; Bulgaria | 180.0 kg |
| Clean & Jerk | Anatoly Khrapaty; Soviet Union | 230.0 kg | Sergey Syrtsov; Soviet Union | 222.5 kg | Ivan Chakarov; Bulgaria | 220.0 kg |
| Total | Anatoly Khrapaty; Soviet Union | 415.0 kg | Sergey Syrtsov; Soviet Union | 407.5 kg | Ivan Chakarov; Bulgaria | 400.0 kg |
100 kg
| Snatch | Nicu Vlad; Romania | 190.0 kg | Petar Stefanov; Bulgaria | 187.5 kg | Pavel Kuznetsov; Soviet Union | 180.0 kg |
| Clean & Jerk | Petar Stefanov; Bulgaria | 227.5 kg | Udo Guse; East Germany | 222.5 kg | Nicu Vlad; Romania | 222.5 kg |
| Total | Petar Stefanov; Bulgaria | 415.0 kg | Nicu Vlad; Romania | 412.5 kg | Pavel Kuznetsov; Soviet Union | 400.0 kg |
110 kg
| Snatch | Ronny Weller; East Germany | 202.5 kg | Yury Zakharevich; Soviet Union | 202.5 kg | Andrew Davies; Great Britain | 185.0 kg |
| Clean & Jerk | Stefan Botev; Bulgaria | 242.5 kg | Mirosław Dąbrowski; Poland | 212.5 kg | Andrew Davies; Great Britain | 210.0 kg |
| Total | Stefan Botev; Bulgaria | 427.5 kg | Andrew Davies; Great Britain | 395.0 kg | Mirosław Dąbrowski; Poland | 382.5 kg |
+110 kg
| Snatch | Aleksandr Kurlovich; Soviet Union | 215.0 kg | Rizvan Geliskhanov; Soviet Union | 200.0 kg | Michael Schubert; East Germany | 195.0 kg |
| Clean & Jerk | Aleksandr Kurlovich; Soviet Union | 245.0 kg | Manfred Nerlinger; West Germany | 242.5 kg | Rizvan Geliskhanov; Soviet Union | 232.5 kg |
| Total | Aleksandr Kurlovich; Soviet Union | 460.0 kg | Rizvan Geliskhanov; Soviet Union | 432.5 kg | Michael Schubert; East Germany | 425.0 kg |

=== Women ===
| Event | Gold | | Silver | | Bronze | |
44 kg
| Snatch | Xing Fen; China | 72.5 kg WR | Kunjarani Devi; India | 57.5 kg | Bastiyah Said Muhamad; Indonesia | 57.5 kg |
| Clean & Jerk | Xing Fen; China | 92.5 kg WR | Kunjarani Devi; India | 75.0 kg | Bastiyah Said Muhamad; Indonesia | 72.5 kg |
| Total | Xing Fen; China | 165.0 kg WR | Kunjarani Devi; India | 132.5 kg | Bastiyah Said Muhamad; Indonesia | 130.0 kg |
48 kg
| Snatch | Huang Xiaoyu; China | 75.0 kg | Choi Myung-shik; South Korea | 65.0 kg | Robin Byrd; United States | 62.5 kg |
| Clean & Jerk | Huang Xiaoyu; China | 97.5 kg WR | Choi Myung-shik; South Korea | 82.5 kg | Chu Nan-mei; Chinese Taipei | 77.5 kg |
| Total | Huang Xiaoyu; China | 172.5 kg WR | Choi Myung-shik; South Korea | 147.5 kg | Chu Nan-mei; Chinese Taipei | 137.5 kg |
52 kg
| Snatch | Peng Liping; China | 77.5 kg | Hiromi Uemura; Japan | 70.0 kg | Chhaya Adak; India | 65.0 kg |
| Clean & Jerk | Peng Liping; China | 107.5 kg WR | Hiromi Uemura; Japan | 85.0 kg | Siyka Stoeva; Bulgaria | 82.5 kg |
| Total | Peng Liping; China | 185.0 kg WR | Hiromi Uemura; Japan | 155.0 kg | Siyka Stoeva; Bulgaria | 147.5 kg |
56 kg
| Snatch | Xing Liwei; China | 77.5 kg | Lalita Polley; India | 72.5 kg | Janeta Georgieva; Bulgaria | 77.5 kg |
| Clean & Jerk | Xing Liwei; China | 102.5 kg | Shyamala Shetty; India | 92.5 kg | Yang Mei-tzu; Chinese Taipei | 90.0 kg |
| Total | Xing Liwei; China | 180.0 kg | Janeta Georgieva; Bulgaria | 162.5 kg | Lalita Polley; India | 160.0 kg |
60 kg
| Snatch | Ma Na; China | 87.5 kg | Camelia Nikolaeva; Bulgaria | 87.5 kg WR | Daniela Kerkelova; Bulgaria | 82.5 kg |
| Clean & Jerk | Ma Na; China | 115.0 kg | Camelia Nikolaeva; Bulgaria | 115.0 kg WR | Maria Christoforidou; Greece | 100.0 kg |
| Total | Ma Na; China | 202.5 kg | Camelia Nikolaeva; Bulgaria | 202.5 kg WR | Daniela Kerkelova; Bulgaria | 182.5 kg |
67.5 kg
| Snatch | Guo Qiuxiang; China | 97.5 kg WR | Mária Takács; Hungary | 87.5 kg | Diana Fuhrman; United States | 87.5 kg |
| Clean & Jerk | Guo Qiuxiang; China | 122.5 kg WR | Mária Takács; Hungary | 112.5 kg | Kumi Haseba; Japan | 107.5 kg |
| Total | Guo Qiuxiang; China | 220.0 kg WR | Mária Takács; Hungary | 200.0 kg | Valkana Tosheva; Bulgaria | 190.0 kg |
75 kg
| Snatch | Milena Trendafilova; Bulgaria | 95.0 kg WR | Arlys Kovach; United States | 92.5 kg | Zhang Xiaoli; China | 90.0 kg |
| Clean & Jerk | Milena Trendafilova; Bulgaria | 125.0 kg | Zhang Xiaoli; China | 125.0 kg WR | Chen Shu-chih; Chinese Taipei | 110.0 kg |
| Total | Milena Trendafilova; Bulgaria | 220.0 kg WR | Zhang Xiaoli; China | 215.0 kg | Arlys Kovach; United States | 202.5 kg |
82.5 kg
| Snatch | Li Hongling; China | 102.5 kg WR | María Isabel Urrutia; Colombia | 100.0 kg | Judy Oakes; Great Britain | 87.5 kg |
| Clean & Jerk | Li Hongling; China | 137.5 kg WR | María Isabel Urrutia; Colombia | 130.0 kg | Erika Takács; Hungary | 117.5 kg |
| Total | Li Hongling; China | 240.0 kg WR | María Isabel Urrutia; Colombia | 230.0 kg | Judy Oakes; Great Britain | 202.5 kg |
+82.5 kg
| Snatch | Karyn Marshall; United States | 110.0 kg WR | Han Changmei; China | 105.0 kg | Christina Ilieva; Bulgaria | 82.5 kg |
| Clean & Jerk | Han Changmei; China | 137.5 kg WR | Karyn Marshall; United States | 130.0 kg | Carol Cady; United States | 105.0 kg |
| Total | Han Changmei; China | 242.5 kg WR | Karyn Marshall; United States | 240.0 kg | Carol Cady; United States | 185.0 kg |

== Medal table ==
Ranking by Big (Total result) medals

| Rank | Nation | Gold | Silver | Bronze | Total |
|---|---|---|---|---|---|
| 1 | China | 8 | 3 | 1 | 12 |
| 2 | Bulgaria | 5 | 5 | 4 | 14 |
| 3 | Soviet Union | 5 | 2 | 1 | 8 |
| 4 | Turkey | 1 | 0 | 0 | 1 |
| 5 | Romania | 0 | 1 | 2 | 3 |
| 5 | United States | 0 | 1 | 2 | 3 |
| 7 | Great Britain | 0 | 1 | 1 | 2 |
| 7 | India | 0 | 1 | 1 | 2 |
| 9 | Colombia | 0 | 1 | 0 | 1 |
| 9 | Cuba | 0 | 1 | 0 | 1 |
| 9 | Hungary | 0 | 1 | 0 | 1 |
| 9 | Japan | 0 | 1 | 0 | 1 |
| 9 | South Korea | 0 | 1 | 0 | 1 |
| 14 | East Germany | 0 | 0 | 2 | 2 |
| 14 | North Korea | 0 | 0 | 2 | 2 |
| 16 | Chinese Taipei | 0 | 0 | 1 | 1 |
| 16 | Indonesia | 0 | 0 | 1 | 1 |
| 16 | Poland | 0 | 0 | 1 | 1 |
| Totals (18 entries) | | 19 | 19 | 19 | 57 |

Ranking by all medals: Big (Total result) and Small (Snatch and Clean & Jerk)

| Rank | Nation | Gold | Silver | Bronze | Total |
|---|---|---|---|---|---|
| 1 | China | 26 | 5 | 5 | 36 |
| 2 | Soviet Union | 13 | 8 | 4 | 25 |
| 3 | Bulgaria | 12 | 12 | 12 | 36 |
| 4 | Turkey | 3 | 0 | 0 | 3 |
| 5 | Romania | 1 | 3 | 5 | 9 |
| 5 | United States | 1 | 3 | 5 | 9 |
| 7 | East Germany | 1 | 3 | 4 | 8 |
| 8 | India | 0 | 5 | 2 | 7 |
| 9 | South Korea | 0 | 4 | 0 | 4 |
| 10 | Hungary | 0 | 3 | 1 | 4 |
| 10 | Japan | 0 | 3 | 1 | 4 |
| 12 | Colombia | 0 | 3 | 0 | 3 |
| 13 | Great Britain | 0 | 1 | 4 | 5 |
| 13 | North Korea | 0 | 1 | 4 | 5 |
| 15 | Cuba | 0 | 1 | 1 | 2 |
| 15 | Poland | 0 | 1 | 1 | 2 |
| 17 | West Germany | 0 | 1 | 0 | 1 |
| 18 | Chinese Taipei | 0 | 0 | 4 | 4 |
| 19 | Indonesia | 0 | 0 | 3 | 3 |
| 20 | Greece | 0 | 0 | 1 | 1 |
| Totals (20 entries) | | 57 | 57 | 57 | 171 |
