= Weightlifting at the 1992 Summer Olympics =

Weightlifting at the Games of the XXV Olympiad
- Venue: Pavelló de l'Espanya Industrial
- Dates: 26 July–4 August 1992
- Competitors: 244 from 69 nations

The Weightlifting Competition at the 1992 Summer Olympics in Barcelona consisted of ten weight classes, for men only.

== Medal summary ==
Games	Gold	Silver	Bronze
52 kg	Ivan Ivanov; Bulgaria	Lin Qisheng; China	Traian Cihărean; Romania
56 kg	Chun Byung-Kwan; South Korea	Liu Shoubin; China	Luo Jianming; China
60 kg	Naim Süleymanoğlu; Turkey	Nikolaj Pešalov; Bulgaria	He Yingqiang; China
67.5 kg	Israel Militosyan; Unified Team (Armenia)	Yoto Yotov; Bulgaria	Andreas Behm; Germany
75 kg	Tudor Casapu; Unified Team (Moldova)	Pablo Lara; Cuba	Kim Myong-Nam; North Korea
82.5 kg	Pyrros Dimas; Greece	Krzysztof Siemion; Poland	none awarded
90 kg	Kakhi Kakhiashvili; Unified Team (Georgia)	Sergey Syrtsov; Unified Team (Russia)	Sergiusz Wolczaniecki; Poland
100 kg	Viktor Tregubov; Unified Team (Russia)	Timur Taymazov; Unified Team (Ukraine)	Waldemar Malak; Poland
110 kg	Ronny Weller; Germany	Artour Akoev; Unified Team (Russia)	Stefan Botev; Bulgaria
+110 kg	Aleksandr Kurlovich; Unified Team (Belarus)	Leonid Taranenko; Unified Team (Belarus)	Manfred Nerlinger; Germany

== Medal table ==
Rank	Nation	Gold	Silver	Bronze	Total
1	Unified Team	5	4	0	9
2	Bulgaria	1	2	1	4
3	Germany	1	0	2	3
4	Greece	1	0	0	1
4	South Korea	1	0	0	1
4	Turkey	1	0	0	1
7	China	0	2	2	4
8	Poland	0	1	2	3
9	Cuba	0	1	0	1
10	North Korea	0	0	1	1
10	Romania	0	0	1	1
Totals (11 entries)		10	10	9	29

== Sources ==
- "Olympic Medal Winners". International Olympic Committee.
- Official Olympic Report
