= 1992 European Weightlifting Championships =

International weightlifting competition

1992 European Championships

The 1992 European Weightlifting Championships were held in Szekszárd, Hungary from April 21 to April 26, 1992. It was the 71st edition of the event. There were a total number of 149 athletes competing, from 30 nations. The women competition were held in Loures, Portugal. It was the 5th event for the women.

== Medal summary ==
=== Men ===
Event	Gold		Silver		Bronze	
52 kg
Snatch	Traian Cihărean; Romania	117.5 kg	Sevdalin Minchev; Bulgaria	115.0 kg	Halil Mutlu; Turkey	110.0 kg
Clean & Jerk	Sevdalin Minchev; Bulgaria	140.0 kg	Halil Mutlu; Turkey	137.5 kg	Traian Cihărean; Romania	137.5 kg
Total	Sevdalin Minchev; Bulgaria	255 kg	Traian Cihărean; Romania	255.0 kg	Halil Mutlu; Turkey	247.5 kg
56 kg
Snatch	Jacek Gutowski; Poland	117.5 kg	Ivan Ivanov; Bulgaria	117.5 kg	Albert Nassibullin; Unified Team (UKR)	117.5 kg
Clean & Jerk	Ivan Ivanov; Bulgaria	155.0 kg	Albert Nassibullin; Unified Team (UKR)	155.0 kg	Aurel Sîrbu; Romania	150.0 kg
Total	Ivan Ivanov; Bulgaria	272.5 kg	Albert Nassibullin; Unified Team (UKR)	272.5 kg	Aurel Sîrbu; Romania	265.0 kg
60 kg
Snatch	Naim Süleymanoğlu; Turkey	142.5 kg	Sergey Lavrenov; Unified Team (BLR)	140.0 kg	Nikolay Peshalov; Bulgaria	137.5 kg
Clean & Jerk	Nikolay Peshalov; Bulgaria	175.0 kg	Naim Süleymanoğlu; Turkey	170.0 kg	Marco Spanehl; Germany	160.0 kg
Total	Nikolay Peshalov; Bulgaria	312.5 kg	Naim Süleymanoğlu; Turkey	312.5 kg	Sergey Lavrenov; Unified Team (BLR)	300.0 kg
67.5 kg
Snatch	Israel Militosyan; Unified Team (ARM)	155.0 kg	Yoto Yotov; Bulgaria	152.5 kg	Umar Edelkhanov; Unified Team (RUS)	147.5 kg
Clean & Jerk	Yoto Yotov; Bulgaria	185.0 kg	Attila Feri; Romania	182.5 kg	Israel Militosyan; Unified Team (ARM)	180.0 kg
Total	Yoto Yotov; Bulgaria	337.5 kg	Israel Militosyan; Unified Team (ARM)	335.0 kg	Umar Edelkhanov; Unified Team (RUS)	325.0 kg
75 kg
Snatch	Vladimir Kuznetsov; Unified Team (RUS)	165.0 kg	Andrei Socaci; Romania	160.0 kg	Aleksander Zherebkov; Latvia	157.5 kg
Clean & Jerk	Andrei Socaci; Romania	190.0 kg	Vladimir Kuznetsov; Unified Team (RUS)	190.0 kg	Oleg Sadikhov; Israel	187.5 kg
Total	Vladimir Kuznetsov; Unified Team (RUS)	355.0 kg	Andrei Socaci; Romania	350.0 kg	Oleg Sadikhov; Israel	342.5 kg
82.5 kg
Snatch	Ibragim Samadov; Unified Team (RUS)	165.0 kg	Krzysztof Siemion; Poland	165.0 kg	Pyrros Dimas; Greece	165.0 kg
Clean & Jerk	Ibragim Samadov; Unified Team (RUS)	205.0 kg	Krzysztof Siemion; Poland	202.5 kg	Pyrros Dimas; Greece	202.5 kg
Total	Ibragim Samadov; Unified Team (RUS)	370.0 kg	Krzysztof Siemion; Poland	367.5 kg	Pyrros Dimas; Greece	367.5 kg
90 kg
Snatch	Slawomir Zawada; Poland	180.0 kg	Ivan Chakarov; Bulgaria	175.0 kg	Kakhi Kakhiashvili; Unified Team (GEO)	175.0 kg
Clean & Jerk	Kakhi Kakhiashvili; Unified Team (GEO)	225.0 kg	Slawomir Zawada; Poland	212.5 kg	Ivan Chakarov; Bulgaria	210.0 kg
Total	Kakhi Kakhiashvili; Unified Team (GEO)	400.0 kg	Slawomir Zawada; Poland	392.5 kg	Ivan Chakarov; Bulgaria	385.0 kg
100 kg
Snatch	Timur Taymazov; Unified Team (UKR)	190.0 kg	Waldemar Malak; Poland	182.5 kg	Andrei Denisov; Israel	180.0 kg
Clean & Jerk	Timur Taymazov; Unified Team (UKR)	225.0 kg	Andor Szanyi; Hungary	217.5 kg	Francis Tournefier; France	217.5 kg
Total	Timur Taymazov; Unified Team (UKR)	415.0 kg	Waldemar Malak; Poland	395.0 kg	Andor Szanyi; Hungary	392.5 kg
110 kg
Snatch	Igor Kachurin; Unified Team (RUS)	197.5 kg	Yuri Dandik; Israel	190.0 kg	Piotr Banaszak; Poland	180.0 kg
Clean & Jerk	Yuri Dandik; Israel	217.5 kg	Igor Kachurin; Unified Team (RUS)	217.5 kg	Pavlos Saltsidis; Greece	212.5 kg
Total	Igor Kachurin; Unified Team (RUS)	415.0 kg	Yuri Dandik; Israel	407.5 kg	Piotr Banaszak; Poland	390.0 kg
+110 kg
Snatch	Kolio Kolev; Bulgaria	185.0 kg	Erdinç Arslan; Turkey	175.0 kg	Rickard Nilsson; Sweden	170.0 kg
Clean & Jerk	Kolio Kolev; Bulgaria	225.0 kg	Erdinç Arslan; Turkey	220.0 kg	Jiri Zubricky; Czechoslovakia	212.5 kg
Total	Kolio Kolev; Bulgaria	410.0 kg	Erdinç Arslan; Turkey	395.0 kg	Jiri Zubricky; Czechoslovakia	377.5 kg

== Medals tables ==
Ranking by Big (Total result) medals

Rank	Nation	Gold	Silver	Bronze	Total
1	Unified Team	5	2	2	9
2	Bulgaria (BUL)	5	0	1	6
3	Poland (POL)	0	3	1	4
4	Romania (ROU)	0	2	1	3
4	Turkey (TUR)	0	2	1	3
6	Israel (ISR)	0	1	1	2
7	Czechoslovakia (TCH)	0	0	1	1
7	Greece (GRE)	0	0	1	1
7	Hungary (HUN)	0	0	1	1
Totals (9 entries)		10	10	10	30
