= Jiří Zubrický =

Czech Olympic weightlifter (1964–2025)

Personal information
- Nationality: Czech
- Born: 8 February 1964 Most, Czechoslovakia
- Died: 31 December 2025 (aged 61) Czech Republic
- Height: 1.88 m (6 ft 2 in)
- Weight: 165 kg (364 lb)

Sport
- Sport: Weightlifting
- Event: +110 kg
Medal record
Representing Czechoslovakia
Men's weightlifting
World Championships
Bronze medal – third place	1990 Budapest	+110 kg
European Championships
Bronze medal – third place	1992 Szekszárd	+110 kg
- Updated on 1 June 2016

Jiří Zubrický (8 February 1964 – 31 December 2025) was a Czech weightlifter who competed for Czechoslovakia and participated at the Olympic Games in 1988 and 1992. He won bronze medal at the 1990 World Weightlifting Championships, behind the two Soviets Leonid Taranenko and Artur Akoyev. He was the heaviest competitor at the 1988 Summer Olympics with 164.95 kg (363 lb).

Zubrický died on 31 December 2025, at the age of 61.

== Major results ==
Year	Venue	Weight	Snatch (kg)					Clean & Jerk (kg)					Total	Rank
Year	Venue	Weight	1	2	3	Result	Rank	1	2	3	Result	Rank	Total	Rank
Representing Czech Republic
World Championships
1993	Melbourne, Australia	+108 kg	165.0	~~170.0~~	170.0	170.0	13	~~215.0~~	215.0	222.5	222.5	8	392.5	10
European Championships
1996	Stavanger, Norway	+108 kg	~~160.0~~	160.0	~~165.0~~	160.0	15	207.5	215.0	~~220.0~~	215.0	11	375.0	11
1995	Warsaw, Poland	+108 kg	—N/a	—N/a	—N/a	160.0	15	—N/a	—N/a	—N/a	210.0	9	370.0	10
1994	Sokolov, Czech Republic	+108 kg	—N/a	—N/a	—N/a	—	—	—N/a	—N/a	—N/a	215.0	7	—	—
1993	Sofia, Bulgaria	+108 kg	—N/a	—N/a	—N/a	170.0	11	—N/a	—N/a	—N/a	212.5	8	382.5	8
Representing Czechoslovakia
Olympic Games
1992	Barcelona, Spain	+110 kg	170.0	~~172.5~~	~~177.5~~	170.0	11	222.5	~~227.5~~	~~232.5~~	222.5	5	392.5	6
1988	Seoul, South Korea	+110 kg	~~185.0~~	~~185.0~~	~~185.0~~	—	—	—	—	—	—	—	—	—
World Championships
1991	Donaueschingen, Germany	+110 kg	~~170.0~~	170.0	~~175.0~~	170.0	7	~~220.0~~	~~220.0~~	222.5	222.5	4	392.5	6
1990	Budapest, Hungary	+110 kg	—N/a	—N/a	—N/a	165.0	4	—N/a	—N/a	—N/a	215.0	3rd place, bronze medalist(s)	380.0	3rd place, bronze medalist(s)
1989	Athens, Greece	+110 kg	~~170.0~~	170.0	175.0	175.0	5	215.0	225.0	~~232.5~~	225.0	5	400.0	5
1987	Ostrava, Czechoslovakia	+110 kg	—N/a	—N/a	—N/a	195.0	5	—N/a	—N/a	—N/a	242.5	5	437.5	5
1985	Södertälje, Sweden	+110 kg	—N/a	—N/a	—N/a	172.5	6	—N/a	—N/a	—N/a	210.0	6	382.5	6
European Championships
1992	Szekszárd, Hungary	+110 kg	—N/a	—N/a	—N/a	165.0	5	—N/a	—N/a	—N/a	212.5	3rd place, bronze medalist(s)	377.5	3rd place, bronze medalist(s)
1991	Władysławowo, Poland	+110 kg	—N/a	—N/a	—N/a	180.0	6	—N/a	—N/a	—N/a	232.5	3rd place, bronze medalist(s)	412.5	4
1990	Aalborg, Denmark	+110 kg	—N/a	—N/a	—N/a	170.0	7	—N/a	—N/a	—N/a	222.5	5	392.5	5
1989	Athens, Greece	+110 kg	~~170.0~~	170.0	175.0	175.0	5	215.0	225.0	~~232.5~~	225.0	5	400.0	5
1988	(United Kingdom) Cardiff, Great Britain	+110 kg	—N/a	—N/a	—N/a	185.0	4	—N/a	—N/a	—N/a	235.0	4	420.0	4

== See also ==
- Czechoslovakia at the 1992 Summer Olympics
- List of World Championships medalists in weightlifting (men)
