= 1991 World Weightlifting Championships =

Annual weightlifting competition

1991 World Championships
- Host city: Donaueschingen, Germany
- Dates: September 27-October 6, 1991

The 1991 World Weightlifting Championships were held in Donaueschingen, Germany from September 27 to October 6, 1991. The Soviet Union, a major dominant force in the Championship, participated for the last time before its dissolution that same year.

== Medal summary ==
=== Men ===
Event	Gold		Silver		Bronze	
52 kg
Snatch	Zhang Zairong; China	120.5 kg WR	Ivan Ivanov; Bulgaria	117.5 kg	Sevdalin Minchev; Bulgaria	115.0 kg
Clean & Jerk	Ivan Ivanov; Bulgaria	155.5 kg WR	Sevdalin Minchev; Bulgaria	142.5 kg	Zhang Shoulie; China	142.5 kg
Total	Ivan Ivanov; Bulgaria	272.5 kg	Sevdalin Minchev; Bulgaria	257.5 kg	Zhang Zairong; China	255.0 kg
56 kg
Snatch	Liu Shoubin; China	135.0 kg WR	Luo Jianming; China	130.0 kg	Chun Byung-kwan; South Korea	130.0 kg
Clean & Jerk	Chun Byung-kwan; South Korea	165.0 kg	Liu Shoubin; China	157.5 kg	Luo Jianming; China	147.5 kg
Total	Chun Byung-kwan; South Korea	295.0 kg	Liu Shoubin; China	292.5 kg	Luo Jianming; China	277.5 kg
60 kg
Snatch	Naim Süleymanoğlu; Turkey	137.5 kg	He Yingqiang; China	132.5 kg	Yurik Sarkisyan; Soviet Union	132.5 kg
Clean & Jerk	Naim Süleymanoğlu; Turkey	172.5 kg	Yurik Sarkisyan; Soviet Union	170.0 kg	He Yingqiang; China	160.0 kg
Total	Naim Süleymanoğlu; Turkey	310.0 kg	Yurik Sarkisyan; Soviet Union	302.5 kg	He Yingqiang; China	292.5 kg
67.5 kg
Snatch	Kim Myong-nam; North Korea	160.0 kg	Israel Militosyan; Soviet Union	160.0 kg	Yoto Yotov; Bulgaria	155.0 kg
Clean & Jerk	Ri Hi-bong; North Korea	190.0 kg	Yoto Yotov; Bulgaria	190.0 kg	Wang Yong; China	185.0 kg
Total	Yoto Yotov; Bulgaria	345.0 kg	Israel Militosyan; Soviet Union	345.0 kg	Kim Myong-nam; North Korea	340.0 kg
75 kg
Snatch	Lu Gang; China	157.5 kg	Pablo Lara; Cuba	157.5 kg	Roman Sevasteyev; Soviet Union	157.5 kg
Clean & Jerk	Pablo Lara; Cuba	197.5 kg	Roman Sevasteyev; Soviet Union	195.0 kg	Rumen Stoyanov; Bulgaria	192.5 kg
Total	Pablo Lara; Cuba	355.0 kg	Roman Sevasteyev; Soviet Union	352.5 kg	Tudor Casapu; Soviet Union	342.5 kg
82.5 kg
Snatch	Aleksandr Blyshchyk; Soviet Union	167.5 kg	Ibragim Samadov; Soviet Union	162.5 kg	Marc Huster; Germany	160.0 kg
Clean & Jerk	Ibragim Samadov; Soviet Union	205.0 kg	Cai Yanshu; China	200.0 kg	Aleksandr Blyshchyk; Soviet Union	200.0 kg
Total	Ibragim Samadov; Soviet Union	367.5 kg	Aleksandr Blyshchyk; Soviet Union	367.5 kg	Plamen Bratoychev; Bulgaria	357.5 kg
90 kg
Snatch	Sergey Syrtsov; Soviet Union	185.0 kg	Ivan Chakarov; Bulgaria	180.0 kg	Pedro Rodríguez; Cuba	177.5 kg
Clean & Jerk	Sergey Syrtsov; Soviet Union	225.0 kg	Kim Byung-chan; South Korea	212.5 kg	Ivan Chakarov; Bulgaria	210.0 kg
Total	Sergey Syrtsov; Soviet Union	410.0 kg	Ivan Chakarov; Bulgaria	390.0 kg	Kim Byung-chan; South Korea	387.5 kg
100 kg
Snatch	Igor Sadykov; Soviet Union	185.0 kg	Waldemar Malak; Poland	172.5 kg	Włodzimierz Ostapski; Poland	172.5 kg
Clean & Jerk	Igor Sadykov; Soviet Union	230.0 kg	Francis Tournefier; France	215.0 kg	Omar Semanat; Cuba	212.5 kg
Total	Igor Sadykov; Soviet Union	415.0 kg	Ivalin Raychev; Bulgaria	385.0 kg	Francis Tournefier; France	382.5 kg
110 kg
Snatch	Artur Akoyev; Soviet Union	195.0 kg	Ronny Weller; Germany	190.0 kg	Yuri Dandik; Israel	185.0 kg
Clean & Jerk	Artur Akoyev; Soviet Union	232.5 kg	Ronny Weller; Germany	230.0 kg	Frank Seipelt; Germany	215.0 kg
Total	Artur Akoyev; Soviet Union	427.5 kg	Ronny Weller; Germany	420.0 kg	Ernesto Montoya; Cuba	387.5 kg
+110 kg
Snatch	Aleksandr Kurlovich; Soviet Union	205.0 kg	Manfred Nerlinger; Germany	185.0 kg	Martin Zawieja; Germany	180.0 kg
Clean & Jerk	Aleksandr Kurlovich; Soviet Union	250.0 kg	Manfred Nerlinger; Germany	240.0 kg	Kim Tae-hyun; South Korea	225.0 kg
Total	Aleksandr Kurlovich; Soviet Union	455.0 kg	Manfred Nerlinger; Germany	425.0 kg	Kim Tae-hyun; South Korea	400.0 kg

=== Women ===
Event	Gold		Silver		Bronze	
44 kg
Snatch	Xing Fen; China	67.5 kg	Kunjarani Devi; India	62.5 kg	Satomi Saito; Japan	60.0 kg
Clean & Jerk	Xing Fen; China	95.5 kg WR	Kunjarani Devi; India	80.0 kg	Sibby Flowers; United States	80.0 kg
Total	Xing Fen; China	162.5 kg	Kunjarani Devi; India	142.5 kg	Sibby Flowers; United States	140.0 kg
48 kg
Snatch	Izabela Rifatova; Bulgaria	75.0 kg	Liao Shuping; China	72.5 kg	Chu Nan-mei; Chinese Taipei	65.0 kg
Clean & Jerk	Liao Shuping; China	98.0 kg WR	Izabela Rifatova; Bulgaria	95.0 kg	Donka Mincheva; Bulgaria	87.5 kg
Total	Izabela Rifatova; Bulgaria	170.0 kg	Liao Shuping; China	170.0 kg	Donka Mincheva; Bulgaria	152.5 kg
52 kg
Snatch	Peng Liping; China	80.0 kg	Robin Byrd; United States	77.5 kg	Janeta Georgieva; Bulgaria	75.0 kg
Clean & Jerk	Peng Liping; China	108.0 kg WR	Hiromi Uemura; Japan	95.0 kg	Robin Byrd; United States	92.5 kg
Total	Peng Liping; China	187.5 kg WR	Robin Byrd; United States	170.0 kg	Hiromi Uemura; Japan	167.5 kg
56 kg
Snatch	Sun Caiyan; China	85.0 kg WR	Nancy Niro; Canada	80.0 kg	Neli Yankova; Bulgaria	80.0 kg
Clean & Jerk	Sun Caiyan; China	108.0 kg WR	Neli Yankova; Bulgaria	100.0 kg	Mami Abe; Japan	97.5 kg
Total	Sun Caiyan; China	192.5 kg WR	Neli Yankova; Bulgaria	180.0 kg	Nancy Niro; Canada	175.0 kg
60 kg
Snatch	Han Lixia; China	87.5 kg	Won Soon-yi; South Korea	87.5 kg	Daniela Kerkelova; Bulgaria	80.0 kg
Clean & Jerk	Han Lixia; China	110.0 kg	Won Soon-yi; South Korea	107.5 kg	Daniela Kerkelova; Bulgaria	102.5 kg
Total	Han Lixia; China	197.5 kg	Won Soon-yi; South Korea	195.0 kg	Daniela Kerkelova; Bulgaria	182.5 kg
67.5 kg
Snatch	Lei Li; China	95.0 kg	Kumi Haseba; Japan	87.5 kg	Kim Dong-hee; South Korea	87.5 kg
Clean & Jerk	Lei Li; China	115.0 kg	Kumi Haseba; Japan	110.0 kg	Kim Dong-hee; South Korea	107.5 kg
Total	Lei Li; China	210.0 kg	Kumi Haseba; Japan	197.5 kg	Kim Dong-hee; South Korea	195.0 kg
75 kg
Snatch	Milena Trendafilova; Bulgaria	105.0 kg WR	Zhang Xiaoli; China	105.0 kg	Mária Takács; Hungary	90.0 kg
Clean & Jerk	Zhang Xiaoli; China	137.5 kg WR	Milena Trendafilova; Bulgaria	115.0 kg	Mária Takács; Hungary	112.5 kg
Total	Zhang Xiaoli; China	242.5 kg WR	Milena Trendafilova; Bulgaria	220.0 kg	Mária Takács; Hungary	202.5 kg
82.5 kg
Snatch	María Isabel Urrutia; Colombia	107.5 kg WR	Li Hongling; China	102.5 kg	Chen Shu-chih; Chinese Taipei	100.0 kg
Clean & Jerk	Li Hongling; China	138.0 kg WR	María Isabel Urrutia; Colombia	132.5 kg	Chen Shu-chih; Chinese Taipei	120.0 kg
Total	Li Hongling; China	240.0 kg	María Isabel Urrutia; Colombia	240.0 kg	Chen Shu-chih; Chinese Taipei	220.0 kg
+82.5 kg
Snatch	Li Yajuan; China	113.0 kg WR	Carla Garrett; United States	100.0 kg	Erika Takács; Hungary	95.0 kg
Clean & Jerk	Li Yajuan; China	143.0 kg WR	Carla Garrett; United States	132.5 kg	Erika Takács; Hungary	125.0 kg
Total	Li Yajuan; China	255.0 kg WR	Carla Garrett; United States	232.5 kg	Erika Takács; Hungary	220.0 kg

== Medal table ==
Ranking by Big (Total result) medals

Rank	Nation	Gold	Silver	Bronze	Total
1	China	8	2	3	13
2	Soviet Union	5	4	1	10
3	Bulgaria	3	5	3	11
4	South Korea	1	1	3	5
5	Cuba	1	0	1	2
6	Turkey	1	0	0	1
7	United States	0	2	1	3
8	Germany	0	2	0	2
9	Japan	0	1	1	2
10	Colombia	0	1	0	1
10	India	0	1	0	1
12	Hungary	0	0	2	2
13	Canada	0	0	1	1
13	Chinese Taipei	0	0	1	1
13	France	0	0	1	1
13	North Korea	0	0	1	1
Totals (16 entries)		19	19	19	57

Ranking by all medals: Big (Total result) and Small (Snatch and Clean & Jerk)

Rank	Nation	Gold	Silver	Bronze	Total
1	China	26	9	7	42
2	Soviet Union	15	8	4	27
3	Bulgaria	6	12	12	30
4	Turkey	3	0	0	3
5	South Korea	2	4	7	13
6	Cuba	2	1	3	6
7	North Korea	2	0	1	3
8	Colombia	1	2	0	3
9	Germany	0	6	3	9
10	United States	0	5	3	8
11	Japan	0	4	3	7
12	India	0	3	0	3
13	Canada	0	1	1	2
13	France	0	1	1	2
13	Poland	0	1	1	2
16	Hungary	0	0	6	6
17	Chinese Taipei	0	0	4	4
18	Israel	0	0	1	1
Totals (18 entries)		57	57	57	171
