= 1998 World Weightlifting Championships – Men's 56 kg =

The 1998 World Weightlifting Championships were held in Lahti, Finland from November 7 to November 15. The men's competition in the bantamweight (56 kg) division was staged on 10 November 1998.

== Medalists ==
Event	Gold		Silver		Bronze	
Snatch	Halil Mutlu (TUR)	135.0 kg	Lan Shizhang (CHN)	127.5 kg	William Vargas (CUB)	127.5 kg
Clean & Jerk	Halil Mutlu (TUR)	160.0 kg	Ivan Ivanov (BUL)	160.0 kg	Lan Shizhang (CHN)	157.5 kg
Total	Halil Mutlu (TUR)	295.0 kg	Lan Shizhang (CHN)	285.0 kg	Ivan Ivanov (BUL)	282.5 kg

== Records ==
Prior to this competition, the existing world records were as follows.

World Record	Snatch	World Standard	135.0 kg	—	1 January 1998
World Record	Clean & Jerk	Lan Shizhang (CHN)	165.5 kg	Szekszárd, Hungary	9 May 1998
World Record	Total	World Standard	300.0 kg	—	1 January 1998

== Results ==
Rank	Athlete	Body weight	Snatch (kg)				Clean & Jerk (kg)				Total
Rank	Athlete	Body weight	1	2	3	Rank	1	2	3	Rank	Total
1st place, gold medalist(s)	Halil Mutlu (TUR)	55.66	130.0	~~135.0~~	135.0	1st place, gold medalist(s)	~~160.0~~	160.0	~~166.0~~	1st place, gold medalist(s)	295.0
2nd place, silver medalist(s)	Lan Shizhang (CHN)	55.85	122.5	127.5	~~130.0~~	2nd place, silver medalist(s)	~~157.5~~	157.5	~~165.0~~	3rd place, bronze medalist(s)	285.0
3rd place, bronze medalist(s)	Ivan Ivanov (BUL)	55.86	122.5	~~127.5~~	~~127.5~~	4	155.0	160.0	~~165.0~~	2nd place, silver medalist(s)	282.5
4	William Vargas (CUB)	55.94	127.5	~~130.0~~	~~132.5~~	3rd place, bronze medalist(s)	150.0	155.0	~~160.0~~	4	282.5
5	Adrian Jigău (ROM)	55.79	117.5	~~122.5~~	~~122.5~~	6	~~145.0~~	145.0	~~155.0~~	5	262.5
6	Traian Cihărean (ROM)	55.87	115.0	120.0	~~122.5~~	5	~~140.0~~	140.0	~~145.0~~	7	260.0
7	Éric Bonnel (FRA)	55.50	~~110.0~~	110.0	~~115.0~~	8	135.0	140.0	142.5	6	252.5
8	László Tancsics (HUN)	55.18	110.0	115.0	~~117.5~~	7	135.0	~~140.0~~	~~140.0~~	10	250.0
9	Toshiyuki Notomi (JPN)	55.28	~~105.0~~	105.0	107.5	10	135.0	~~137.5~~	137.5	9	245.0
10	Ali Hamid (EGY)	55.81	102.5	107.5	110.0	9	130.0	135.0	~~137.5~~	11	245.0
11	Michael Ponchard (FRA)	55.69	95.0	~~100.0~~	~~100.0~~	13	127.5	~~132.5~~	~~132.5~~	12	222.5
12	Nafaa Benami (ALG)	54.24	90.0	~~100.0~~	100.0	12	110.0	117.5	~~122.5~~	14	217.5
13	François Lagacé (CAN)	55.62	95.0	100.5	102.5	11	112.5	~~117.5~~	~~117.5~~	15	215.0
14	Anatoli Shavalov (ISR)	55.83	95.0	~~100.0~~	~~100.0~~	14	115.0	~~120.0~~	120.0	13	215.0
—	Juan Carlos Fernández (COL)	55.90	~~110.0~~	~~110.0~~	~~110.0~~	—	135.0	140.0	~~142.5~~	8	—
—	Gennadi Oleinik (ISR)	55.80	~~95.0~~	~~95.0~~	—	—	—	—	—	—	—
