= Ivan Chakarov =

Bulgarian weightlifter (born 1966)

Personal information
- Nationality: Bulgarian
- Born: 26 November 1966 (age 59) Bulgaria
- Weight: 94 kg (207 lb) (1998)

Sport
- Country: Bulgaria
- Sport: Weightlifting
- Events: 90 kg (1987-1992); 91 kg (1993-1997); 94 kg (1998)
- Club: CSKA
- Coached by: Ivan Abadjiev
Medal record
Men's Weightlifting
Representing Bulgaria
World Championships
Gold medal – first place	1993 Melbourne	– 91 kg
Silver medal – second place	1987 Ostrava	– 90 kg
Silver medal – second place	1990 Budapest	– 90 kg
Silver medal – second place	1991 Donaueschingen	– 90 kg
Bronze medal – third place	1989 Athens	– 90 kg
European Championships
Gold medal – first place	1991 Wladyslawowo	– 90 kg
Silver medal – second place	1988 Cardiff	– 90 kg
Silver medal – second place	1998 Riesa	– 94 kg
Bronze medal – third place	1989 Athens	– 90 kg
Bronze medal – third place	1990 Aalborg	– 90 kg
Bronze medal – third place	1992 Szekszard	– 90 kg
Bronze medal – third place	1993 Sofia	– 91 kg
Bronze medal – third place	1994 Sokolov	– 91 kg
IWF World Cup
Gold medal – first place	1989 Melbourne	– 90 kg
Gold medal – first place	1990 Varna	– 90 kg
Gold medal – first place	1991 Varna	– 90 kg
Gold medal – first place	1991 Meissen	– 90 kg
EWF European Team Cup
Gold medal – first place	1988 Angers	– 90 kg
Gold medal – first place	1989 Sofia	– 90 kg
Junior World Championships
Gold medal – first place	1986 Donaueschingen	– 82,5 kg
Junior European Championships
Gold medal – first place	1986 Donaueschingen	– 82,5 kg
Bulgarian Championships
Gold medal – first place	1987 Yambol	– 90 kg
Gold medal – first place	1988 Sliven	– 90 kg
Gold medal – first place	1994 Shumen	– 91 kg
Gold medal – first place	1995 Asenovgrad	– 91 kg
Gold medal – first place	1997 Asenovgrad	– 99 kg
Bulgaria Team Championships
Gold medal – first place	1987 Plovdiv	– 90 kg
Bulgarian Junior&Youth Championships
Gold medal – first place	1986 Gorna Oryahovitsa	– 82,5 kg
Gold medal – first place	1983 Silistra	– 48 kg

Ivan Chakarov (Bulgarian: Иван Чакъров), also known as "James Dean" of weightlifting, born 1966, is a Bulgarian world class weightlifter who won gold medals in the 91 kg class at the 1993 World Weightlifting Championships in Melbourne, Australia and in the 90 kg class at the 1991 European Weightlifting Championships in Władysławowo, Poland. He also competed in the men's middle heavyweight event at the 1992 Summer Olympics. Chakarov won European Cup with the team of Bulgaria in Angers 1988 and Sofia 1989. He began training in 1979 at the Chernomorets Burgas Club. His first coach is Konstantin Darov. Chakarov competed for Chernomorets until 1985. After that, until the end of his long and successful career, he competed only for CSKA Sofia. His personal coaches were Andon Nikolov, Rumen Alexandrov and Neno Terziyski. Chakarov has set two world records.

== Personal Bests ==
=== Weightlifting ===
- Snatch: 187.5 kg
- Clean and Jerk: 230 kg
- Best Total: 417.5 kg (480 sinclair) (About the 10th best weightlifter ever)

=== Other exercises ===
- Power Clean: 180.0 kg X2 (Strict), 200 kg (some depth)
- Back Squat: 1RM: 330.0 kg (Some sources say 350 kg, though it is likely to be inaccurate, a 335 kg value is more likely provided from other sources, but he definitely squatted 330 in the back squat). 3RM: 285 kg
- Front Squat: 280.0 kg
- Clean: 230.0 kg (Accomplished twice at the 1987 world weightlifting championships)
- Military Press: 120.0 kg
- Bench Press: 150.0 kg
- Clean Pull: 290.0 kg
- Power Snatch (above Parallel) : 150.0 kg
- Snatch Pull: 250.0 kg
- Deadlift: 310.0 kg

== No-No-No Squats ==
Chakarov was exceptional in the Back Squat, and squatted 270 kg (595.25 lbs) for 3 deep repetitions at the 1993 World Weightlifting Championships. This feat became well known as the "No-No-No" squat, as Chakarov did not use a lifting belt, knee wraps, or spotters for this attempt.
