= Ivan Ivanov (weightlifter) =

Bulgarian weightlifter (born 1971)

Personal information
- Nationality: Bulgarian
- Born: 27 August 1971 (age 54) Shumen, Bulgaria

Sport
- Country: Bulgaria
- Sport: Weightlifting
- Events: 52 kg, 54 kg, 56 kg
- Coached by: Ivan Abadjiev
- Retired: 2000
- Now coaching: Bulgarian National Team
Medal record
Men's Weightlifting
Representing Bulgaria
Olympic Games
Gold medal – first place	1992 Barcelona	52 kg
World Championships
Gold medal – first place	1993 Melbourne	54 kg
Gold medal – first place	1991 Donaueschingen	52 kg
Gold medal – first place	1990 Budapest	52 kg
Gold medal – first place	1989 Athens	52 kg
Silver medal – second place	1994 Istanbul	54 kg
Bronze medal – third place	1998 Lahti	56 kg
European Championships
Gold medal – first place	1998 Riesa	56 kg
Gold medal – first place	1993 Sofia	54 kg
Gold medal – first place	1992 Szekszard	56 kg
Gold medal – first place	1990 Aalborg	52 kg
Gold medal – first place	1989 Athens	52 kg
Silver medal – second place	2000 Sofia	56 kg
Silver medal – second place	1995 Warsaw	54 kg
Bronze medal – third place	1999 La Coruña	56 kg
Bronze medal – third place	1991 Wladyslawowo	52 kg
IWF World Cup Winner
Gold medal – first place	1990 Tainan	52 kg
IWF World Cup Final
Gold medal – first place	1990 Tainan	52 kg
Gold medal – first place	1991 Barcelona	52 kg
Silver medal – second place	1989 Lisbon	52 kg
IWF World Cup
Gold medal – first place	1990 Melbourne	52 kg
Gold medal – first place	1990 Varna	56 kg
Gold medal – first place	1991 Varna	56 kg
Gold medal – first place	1991 Melbourne	52 kg
Goodwill Games
Gold medal – first place	1990 Seattle	52 kg Total
Gold medal – first place	1990 Seattle	52 kg Clean and Jerk
Silver medal – second place	1990 Seattle	52 kg Snatch
Junior World Championships
Gold medal – first place	1988 Athens	52 kg
Gold medal – first place	1989 Fort Lauderdale	52 kg
Gold medal – first place	1990 Sarajevo	56 kg
Junior European Championships
Gold medal – first place	1988 Athens	52 kg
Gold medal – first place	1991 Varna	56 kg
Bulgarian Championships
Gold medal – first place	1989 Dobrich	52 kg
Gold medal – first place	1991 Haskovo	56 kg
Gold medal – first place	1995 Asenovgrad	59 kg
Gold medal – first place	1998 Asenovgrad	62 kg
Gold medal – first place	2000 Asenovgrad	62 kg
Silver medal – second place	1994 Shumen	59 kg
Silver medal – second place	1996 Asenovgrad	59 kg
Bronze medal – third place	1997 Asenovgrad	59 kg
Bronze medal – third place	1997 Asenovgrad	62 kg
Bulgarian Team Championships
Gold medal – first place	1990 Dobrich	56 kg
Bulgarian Junior&Youth Championships
Gold medal – first place	1987 Plovdiv	52 kg
Silver medal – second place	1988 Haskovo	56 kg

Ivan Ivanov Ivanov (Bulgarian: Иван Иванов Иванов, born 27 August 1971 in Shumen) is a Bulgarian former weightlifter and former head coach of the national Bulgarian weightlifting teams. He claimed one gold medal at the 1992 Olympic Games, four time World Champion, and five time European Champion. He won the 1990 World Cup. Ivan also won 1991 World Cup Final in Barcelona and 1990 World Cup Final in Tainan, and in 1989 in Lisbon he finished second. In 1990, he became a gold medalist in Total and Clean, and Jerk and silver, medalist in Snatch of the Goodwill Games in Seattle. Ivanov was named the Best Weightlifter in the World by the International Weightlifting Federation for 1989 and 1990. He was named the BTA Best Balkan Athlete of the Year in 1993. Ivanov is also a three-time World Junior Champion and twice European Junior Champion. He was elected as the best coach of Bulgaria for 2019 by the Ministry of Youth and Sports of the country together with the trainer on rhythmic gymnastics Vesela Dimitrova.

== Career ==
=== Olympics ===
Ivanov made his Olympic debut at the 1992 Summer Olympics competing in the flyweight division (52 kg). He was the heavy favorite to win the gold medal as the three time reigning World Champion and World Record holder in the clean & jerk and total. After the snatch portion of the competition he was in second place (due to being 0.1 kg heavier than leader Lin Qisheng). Later in the clean & jerk portion, he set a new Olympic Record 150.0 kg in the clean & jerk to claim the gold medal.

In 1996, the IWF restructured the weight classes and Ivanov competed in the newly created 54 kg category. He finished in 7th place after the snatch portion and 6th overall after the clean & jerk portion was completed. His 257.5 kg total was his lowest total of the year and this was the first senior competition in which he did not win a medal in the overall total lift.

Ivanov qualified for the Bulgarian 2000 Olympic team and actually did compete in the 56 kg category. He won a silver medal but failed the doping test and was disqualified. He tested positive for the banned diuretic furosemide.

== Major results ==
Year	Venue	Weight	Snatch (kg)				Clean & Jerk (kg)				Total	Rank
Year	Venue	Weight	1	2	3	Rank	1	2	3	Rank	Total	Rank
Olympic Games
1992	Barcelona, Spain	52 kg	110.0	115.0	~~117.5~~	2	142.5	147.5	150.0	1	265.0	1st place, gold medalist(s)
1996	Atlanta, United States	54 kg	~~112.5~~	~~112.5~~	112.5	7	~~145.0~~	145.0	~~155.0~~	6	257.5	6
2000	Sydney, Australia	56 kg	125.0	~~130.0~~	130.0	—	155.0	160.0	162.5	—	—	DSQ
World Championships
1989	Athens, Greece	52 kg	110.0	115.0	117.5	2nd place, silver medalist(s)	142.5	147.5	155.0 WR	1st place, gold medalist(s)	272.5 WR	1st place, gold medalist(s)
1990	Budapest, Hungary	52 kg	110.0	~~115.0~~	115.0	3rd place, bronze medalist(s)	137.5	142.5	150.0	1st place, gold medalist(s)	265.0	1st place, gold medalist(s)
1991	Donaueschingen, Germany	52 kg	110.0	115.0	117.5	2nd place, silver medalist(s)	140.0	145.0	155.5 WR	1st place, gold medalist(s)	272.5	1st place, gold medalist(s)
1993	Melbourne, Australia	54 kg	115.0	~~120.0~~	120.0	4	150.0	~~157.5~~	157.5	1st place, gold medalist(s)	277.5 WR	1st place, gold medalist(s)
1994	Istanbul, Turkey	54 kg	115.0	120.0	—	4	150.0	155.0	~~158.5~~	2nd place, silver medalist(s)	275.0	2nd place, silver medalist(s)
1998	Lahti, Finland	56 kg	122.5	~~127.5~~	~~127.5~~	4	155.0	160.0	~~165.0~~	2nd place, silver medalist(s)	282.5	3rd place, bronze medalist(s)
1999	Athens, Greece	56 kg	115.0	120.0	122.5	6	150.0	155.0	157.5	3rd place, bronze medalist(s)	280.0	4

== Weightlifting achievements ==
- Olympic champion (1992)*
- World Champion (1989, 1990, 1991, 1993)*
- 1994 World Championship silver medal*
- 1998 World Championships bronze medal*
- European Champion (1989, 1990, 1992, 1993 and 1998)*
- 1995 & 2000 European Championships silver medal*
- 1999 & 1991 European Championships bronze medal*
- 1990 World Cup Winner*
- 1993 Athlete of the Balkans*
- 1989 & 1990 IWF Weightlifter of the Year*
- 1990 Goodwill Games Gold Medalist*
- Junior World Champion (1988, 1989, 1990)*
- Junior European Champion (1988, 1991)*
- Bulgarian Champion (1989, 1991, 1995, 1998, 2000)*
