= Hafız Süleymanoğlu =

Turkish weightlifter

Personal information
- Nationality: Azerbaijani
- Born: Hafız Süleymanov; January 23, 1967 (age 59) Sumqayıt, Azerbaijan SSR

Sport
- Country: Soviet Union, Turkey
- Sport: Weightlifting
- Event(s): –56 kg, –59 kg and –60 kg
Medal record
Representing Soviet Union
World Championships
Gold medal – first place	1989 Athens	-56 kg
European Championships
Gold medal – first place	1989 Athens	-56 kg
Representing Turkey
World Championships
Silver medal – second place	1993 Melbourne	-59 kg
Silver medal – second place	1994 Istanbul	-59 kg
Silver medal – second place	1997 Chiang Mai	-64 kg
European Championships
Gold medal – first place	1991 Władysławowo	-56 kg
Silver medal – second place	1993 Sofia	-59 kg
Bronze medal – third place	1995 Warsaw	-59 kg
Gold medal – first place	1997 Rijeka	-64 kg

Hafız Süleymanoğlu (born January 23, 1967), formerly known as Hafız Süleymanov, is a retired Turkish weightlifter of Azerbaijani origin competing in bantamweight and featherweight divisions. He held world and European champion titles.

== Career ==
He started weightlifting at the age of 15 in Azerbaijan. In 1985, he was admitted to the national team of the Soviet Union. He earned European and world champion titles in juniors category. In 1989, Hafız Süleymanov became world and European champion in seniors category for the Soviet Union.

After his participation at the 1989 World Weightlifting Championships, he defected from the Azerbaijan Soviet Socialist Republic and immigrated to Turkey. He earned his first medal for Turkey in gold in the -56 kg snatch division at the 1990 World Weightlifting Championships held in Budapest, Hungary. Unfortunately, he broke his arm during the clean and jerk session. He received various medals in world and European championships, and became twice more European champion, at the 1991 European Weightlifting Championships in Władysławowo, Poland in the -56 kg division and at the 1997 European Weightlifting Championships in Rijeka, Croatia in the -64 kg division.

Hafız Sülemanoğlu participated twice at the Olympics, 1992 Summer Olympics in Barcelona, Spain and 1996 Summer Olympics in Atlanta, USA. He is gold medalist in 1996 Summer Olympics in Atlanta, USA.

At the 1998 World Weightlifting Championships held in Lahti, Finland, he could reach the 9th rank only. As he repeated his unsuccessful competitions at the 1999 European Weightlifting Championships in A Coruña, Spain and at the 1999 World Weightlifting Championships in Athens, Greece, Turkey Weightlifting Federation decided to take him out of the national team. Hafız Süleymanoğlu declared thereupon that he will return to Azerbaijan.

== Achievements ==
World Championships

Rank	Discipline	Snatch	Clean&Jerk	Total	Place	Date
Silver	-56 kg	130.0			Athens, GRE	Sep 16–23, 1989
Gold	-56 kg		157.5		Athens, GRE	Sep 16–23, 1989
Gold	-56 kg			287.5	Athens, GRE	Sep 16–23, 1989
Gold	-56 kg	132.5			Budapest, HUN	Nov 10–18, 1990
Silver	-59 kg	135.0			Melbourne, AUS	Nov 11-21, 1993
Silver	-59 kg			295.0	Melbourne, AUS	Nov 11-21, 1993
Silver	-59 kg	135.0			Istanbul, TUR	Nov 17-27, 1994
Silver	-59 kg		162.5		Istanbul, TUR	Nov 17-27, 1994
Silver	-59 kg			297.5	Istanbul, TUR	Nov 17-27, 1994
Silver	-64 kg	145.0			Chiang Mai, THA	Dec 6-14, 1997
Silver	-64 kg			315.0	Chiang Mai, THA	Dec 6-14, 1997

European Championships

Rank	Discipline	Snatch	Clean&Jerk	Total	Place	Date
Gold	-56 kg	130.0			Athens, GRE	1989
Gold	-56 kg		157.5		Athens, GRE	1989
Gold	-56 kg			287.5	Athens, GRE	1989
Gold	-56 kg	125.0			Władysławowo, POL	1991
Gold	-56 kg		147.5		Władysławowo, POL	1991
Gold	-56 kg			272.5	Władysławowo, POL	1991
Silver	-59 kg	130.0			Sofia, BUL	1993
Silver	-59 kg		160.0		Sofia, BUL	1993
Silver	-59 kg			290.0	Sofia, BUL	1993
Gold	-59 kg	135.0			Warsaw, POL	1995
Bronze	-59 kg		162.5		Warsaw, POL	1995
Bronze	-59 kg			297.5	Warsaw, POL	1995
Gold	-64 kg	142.5			Rijeka, CRO	1997
Gold	-64 kg		165.0		Rijeka, CRO	1997
Gold	-64 kg			307.5	Rijeka, CRO	1997
