= Rizvan Geliskhanov =

Soviet weightlifter (born 1963)

Personal information
- Born: 1963 (age 62–63)

Sport
- Sport: Weightlifting
Medal record
Representing the Soviet Union
World Championships
Silver medal – second place	1989 Athens	+110 kg
European Championships
Silver medal – second place	1989 Athens	+110 kg
Bronze medal – third place	1990 Ålborg	–110 kg

Rizvan Geliskhanov (Russian: Ризван Гелисханов; born 1963) is a retired Soviet weightlifter of Chechen origin.

== Biography ==
He won a silver medal at the 1989 World Championships, in the class over 110 kg, and a bronze at the 1990 European Championships, until 110 kg. Domestically he held the Soviet title in 1987; in 1988 he won the snatch and clean and jerk events, but placed second in the total, in the 110 kg category.
