= Viktor Sinyak =

Belarusian weightlifter

Personal information
- Full name: Viktor Anatolyevich Sinyak
- Born: 5 May 1970 (age 56) Minsk, Belarus
- Weight: Bantamweight

Sport
- Country: Belarus
- Sport: Weightlifting
- Weight class: Bantamweight
- Team: National team

Viktor Sinyak (Виктор Анатольевич Синяк, born 5 May 1970) is a Belarusian male former weightlifter, who competed in the bantamweight category and represented Belarus at international competitions. He won the silver medal at the 1991 European Weightlifting Championships. He participated at the 1996 Summer Olympics.
