= Kiril Kounev =

Bulgarian-Australian weightlifter

Personal information
- Nationality: Bulgaria; Australia
- Born: 19 April 1968 (age 58) Galabovo, Bulgaria
- Height: 168 cm (5 ft 6 in)
- Weight: 93.49 kg (206.1 lb)

Sport
- Country: Bulgaria Australia
- Sport: Weightlifting
- Weight class: 94 kg
- Club: Hawthorn
- Team: National team
Medal record
Representing Bulgaria
World Weightlifting Championships
Gold medal – first place	1989 Athens	82,5kg
Bronze medal – third place	1990 Budapest	82,5kg
European Weightlifting Championships
Gold medal – first place	1989 Athens	82,5kg
Silver medal – second place	1990 Alborg	82,5kg
Representing Australia
World Weightlifting Championships
Bronze medal – third place	1993 Melbourne	83kg
Commonwealth Games
Gold medal – first place	1994 Victoria BC	83kg Combined – Men
Gold medal – first place	1994 Victoria BC	83kg Combined – Snatch
Gold medal – first place	1994 Victoria BC	83kg Combined – Clean and Jerk
Gold medal – first place	1998 Kuala Lumpur	94kg Combined – Men
Gold medal – first place	1998 Kuala Lumpur	94kg Combined – Snatch
Gold medal – first place	1998 Kuala Lumpur	94kg Combined – Clean and Jerk
- Updated on 2 October 2016

Kiril Kounev (born 19 April 1968 in Galabovo) is a Bulgarian male weightlifter who later represented Australia. He was World and European champion for Bulgaria in 1989, and third in the world and second in Europe in 1990, again for Bulgaria. Later competing in the 94 kg category and representing Australia at international competitions. He participated at the 1996 Summer Olympics in the 83 kg event and at the 2000 Summer Olympics in the 94 kg event. He competed at world championships, most recently at the 1999 World Weightlifting Championships.

== Major results ==
(bronze) – 1990 World Championships Light-Heavyweight class (360.0 kg)
(bronze) – 1993 World Championships Light-Heavyweight class (372.5 kg)
(gold) – 1989 World Championships Light-Heavyweight class (385.0 kg)
(silver) – 1990 European Championships Light-Heavyweight class (370.0 kg)

Year	Venue	Weight	Snatch (kg)				Clean & Jerk (kg)				Total	Rank
Year	Venue	Weight	1	2	3	Rank	1	2	3	Rank	Total	Rank
Summer Olympics
2000	Sydney, Australia	94 kg				—N/a				—N/a		14
1996	Atlanta, United States	83 kg				—N/a				—N/a		4
World Championships
1999	Piraeus, Greece	94 kg	~~165~~	~~165~~	---	---	---	---	---	---	0	---
1998	Lahti, Finland	85 kg	165	170	~~172.5~~	6	205	~~210~~	~~210~~	7	375	8
