= Sevdalin Minchev =

Bulgarian weightlifter (born 1974)

Personal information
- Born: July 25, 1974 (age 52) Gorna Oryahovitsa
- Height: 1.60 m (5 ft 3 in)
Medal record
Men's Weightlifting
Representing Bulgaria
Summer Olympics
Bronze medal – third place	1996 Atlanta	– 54 kg
Disqualified	2000 Sydney	62 kg
World Championships
Silver medal – second place	1991 Donaueschingen	– 52 kg
Bronze medal – third place	1994 Istanbul	– 54 kg
Bronze medal – third place	1997 Chiang Mai	– 59 kg
Bronze medal – third place	1998 Lahti	– 62 kg
Bronze medal – third place	1999 Athens	– 62 kg
European Championships
Gold medal – first place	1992 Szekszard	– 52 kg
Gold medal – first place	1999 La Coruña	– 62 kg
Gold medal – first place	2004 Kyiv	– 62 kg
Gold medal – first place	2005 Sofia	– 62 kg
Silver medal – second place	1991 Wladyslawowo	– 52 kg
Silver medal – second place	1993 Sofia	– 54 kg
Silver medal – second place	1994 Sokolov	– 54 kg
Silver medal – second place	1995 Warszawa	– 59 kg
Silver medal – second place	1996 Stavanger	– 59 kg
Silver medal – second place	1997 Rijeka	– 54 kg
Silver medal – second place	2000 Sofia	– 62 kg

Sevdalin Minchev Angelov (Bulgarian: Севдалин Минчев Ангелов; born July 25, 1974, in Gorna Oryahovitsa, Veliko Tarnovo) is a retired male weightlifter from Bulgaria. He is a four-time Olympian (1992, 1996, 2000 and 2004). Minchev is a 1996 Atlanta Olympics bronze medalist, four-time European champion, seven-time European vice-champion, world vice-champion and four-time world bronze medalist. Sevdalin is also a world champion for juniors from Varna in 1992 and second in the world a year later. He is a four-time European Junior Champion from Varna 1991, Cardiff 1992, Valencia 1993 and Rome 1994. He has 65 medals - 24 gold, 27 silver and 14 bronze, from the snatch, clean and jerk and total from World and European championships for men and juniors, and the Olympic Games, which is a record not only in Bulgarian weightlifting, but also in Bulgarian sports in general. During his career Minchev has set three world records - two for men and one for juniors. He has a long and successful career. Minchev started training in 1986 and he competed for only one club - Sliven. His personal trainer is Hristo Bachvarov. In the national team of Bulgaria he was coached by Ivan Abadjiev, Norair Nurikyan, Yordan Ivanov, Yanko Rusev, Plamen Asparuhov and Neno Terziisky. Minchev is the eight-time champion of Bulgaria - six times for men and two times for juniors. At the 2000 Sidney Summer Olympics, Minchev was disqualified and his results nullified. Minchev tested positive for the banned diuretic furosemide. Sevdalin was stripped of his bronze medal.
