= Oleksandr Blyshchyk =

Ukrainian weightlifter (born 1966)

Aleksandr Blyshchyk
Personal information
- Nationality: Soviet Union; Ukraine
- Born: 4 January 1966 (age 60)
- Weight: 83 kg (183 lb)

Sport
- Country: Soviet Union; Ukraine
- Sport: Weightlifting
- Weight class: 82.5 kg
- Team: National team
Medal record
Men's Weightlifting
Representing Soviet Union
World Championships
Silver medal – second place	1991 Donaueschingen	82.5 kg
Representing Ukraine
European Championships
Gold medal – first place	1993 Sofia	83 kg
Silver medal – second place	1994 Sokolov	83 kg
- Updated on 6 October 2016

Aleksandr Blyshchyk (Олександр Блищик, born 4 January 1966) is a Ukrainian retired weightlifter who competed in the light heavyweight class and represented Soviet Union at international competitions. He won the silver medal at the 1991 World Weightlifting Championships in the 82.5 kg category. He participated at the 1996 Summer Olympics in the 83 kg event.
