= Stefan Botev =

Bulgarian weightlifter (born 1968)

Medal record

Men's weightlifting

Representing Bulgaria

Olympic Games
Bronze medal – third place	1992 Barcelona	-110 kg

World Championships
Gold medal – first place	1989 Athens	110 kg
Gold medal – first place	1990 Budapest	110 kg

European Championships
Silver medal – second place	1987 Reims	110 kg
Silver medal – second place	1988 Cardiff	110 kg
Gold medal – first place	1989 Athens	110 kg
Gold medal – first place	1990 Aalborg	110 kg

IWF World Cup Winner
Gold medal – first place	1988 Athens	110 kg

Goodwill Games
Gold medal – first place	1990 Seattle	110 kg Total
Gold medal – first place	1990 Seattle	110 kg Snatch
Gold medal – first place	1990 Seattle	110 kg Clean and Jerk

Representing Australia

Olympic Games
Bronze medal – third place	1996 Atlanta	+108 kg

World Championships
Silver medal – second place	1993 Melbourne	108 kg
Bronze medal – third place	1994 Istanbul	+108 kg
Bronze medal – third place	1995 Guangzhou	+108 kg

Commonwealth Games
Gold medal – first place	1994 Victoria	+108 kg Total
Gold medal – first place	1994 Victoria	+108 kg Snatch
Silver medal – second place	1994 Victoria	+108 kg Clean and Jerk

Stefan Khristov Botev (Bulgarian: Стефан Христов Ботев, born February 14, 1968, in Harmanli) is an Olympic weightlifter who represented Bulgaria and later competed for Australia. He was coached by Ivan Abadzhiev. Botev is a two-time world and European champion, winner of the World Cup in 1988 and was voted as Bulgaria's Sportsperson of the Year in 1990. Stefan is a two-time Olympic bronze medalist - once for Bulgaria in 1992 and once for Australia in 1996. Botev is a three-time gold medalist from the Goodwill Games in Seattle in 1990.

Botev was originally intended to represent Bulgaria at the 1988 Olympic Games in the heavyweight category. Two of his teammates who had won gold medals in their weight classes tested positive for banned substances, and the Bulgarian weightlifting federation pulled the rest of the team out of the competition the day before Botev was scheduled to compete. At the time, Botev was two-time European Vice-champion, and a heavy favorite for the gold medal.

In 2007 he was elected member of the International Weightlifting Federation Hall of Fame.

== Weightlifting achievements ==
- Bronze medalist in Olympic Games (1992 and 1996);
- Gold medalist in Senior World Championships (1989 and 1990);
- Silver medalist in Senior World Championships (1993);
- Bronze medalist in Senior World Championships (1994 and 1995);
- Senior European champion (1989 and 1990);
- Silver medalist in Senior European Championships (1987 and 1988);
- Three-time gold medalist from the 1990 Goodwill Games in Seattle.
- Gold medalist in Commonwealth Games (1994);
- Set seven world records during his career;
- Junior world record holder in clean and jerk and total (1972–1992).

== Career bests ==
- Snatch: 200.0 kg 1990 in Budapest in the class to 110 kg.
- Clean and jerk: 250.0 kg 1988 in Varna in the class to 110 kg.
- Total: 445.0 (195.0+250.0) in the class to 110 kg.
- Total: 450.0 kg (200.0+250.0) 1996 Summer Olympics in the class over 108 kg.
