= Nikolaj Pešalov =

Bulgarian-born Croatian weightlifter

Personal information
- Nationality: Bulgaria
- Born: Nikolay Slaveev Peshalov; 30 May 1970 (age 56) Vetren, Bulgaria
- Height: 1.67 m (5 ft 6 in)

Sport
- Country: Bulgaria (1989–1998); Croatia (1998–2004)
- Sport: Olympic weightlifting
Medal record
Men's Weightlifting
Representing Bulgaria
Olympic Games
Silver medal – second place	1992 Barcelona	– 60 kg
Bronze medal – third place	1996 Atlanta	– 59 kg
World Championships
Gold medal – first place	1990 Budapest	– 60 kg
Gold medal – first place	1993 Melbourne	– 59 kg
Gold medal – first place	1994 Istanbul	– 59 kg
Silver medal – second place	1989 Athens	– 60 kg
Bronze medal – third place	1995 Guangzhou	– 59 kg
European Championships
Gold medal – first place	1991 Władysławowo	– 60 kg
Gold medal – first place	1992 Szekszárd	– 60 kg
Gold medal – first place	1993 Sofia	– 59 kg
Gold medal – first place	1994 Sokolov	– 59 kg
Gold medal – first place	1995 Warsaw	– 59 kg
Gold medal – first place	1997 Rijeka	– 59 kg
Silver medal – second place	1989 Athens	– 60 kg
Silver medal – second place	1990 Ålborg	– 60 kg
Representing Croatia
World Championships
Olympic Games
Gold medal – first place	2000 Sydney	– 62 kg
Bronze medal – third place	2004 Athens	– 69 kg
World Championships
Silver medal – second place	1998 Lahti	– 62 kg
European Championships
Gold medal – first place	2000 Sofia	– 62 kg
Gold medal – first place	2001 Trencin	– 62 kg
Silver medal – second place	2004 Kyiv	– 69 kg
Bronze medal – third place	1999 La Coruña	– 62 kg

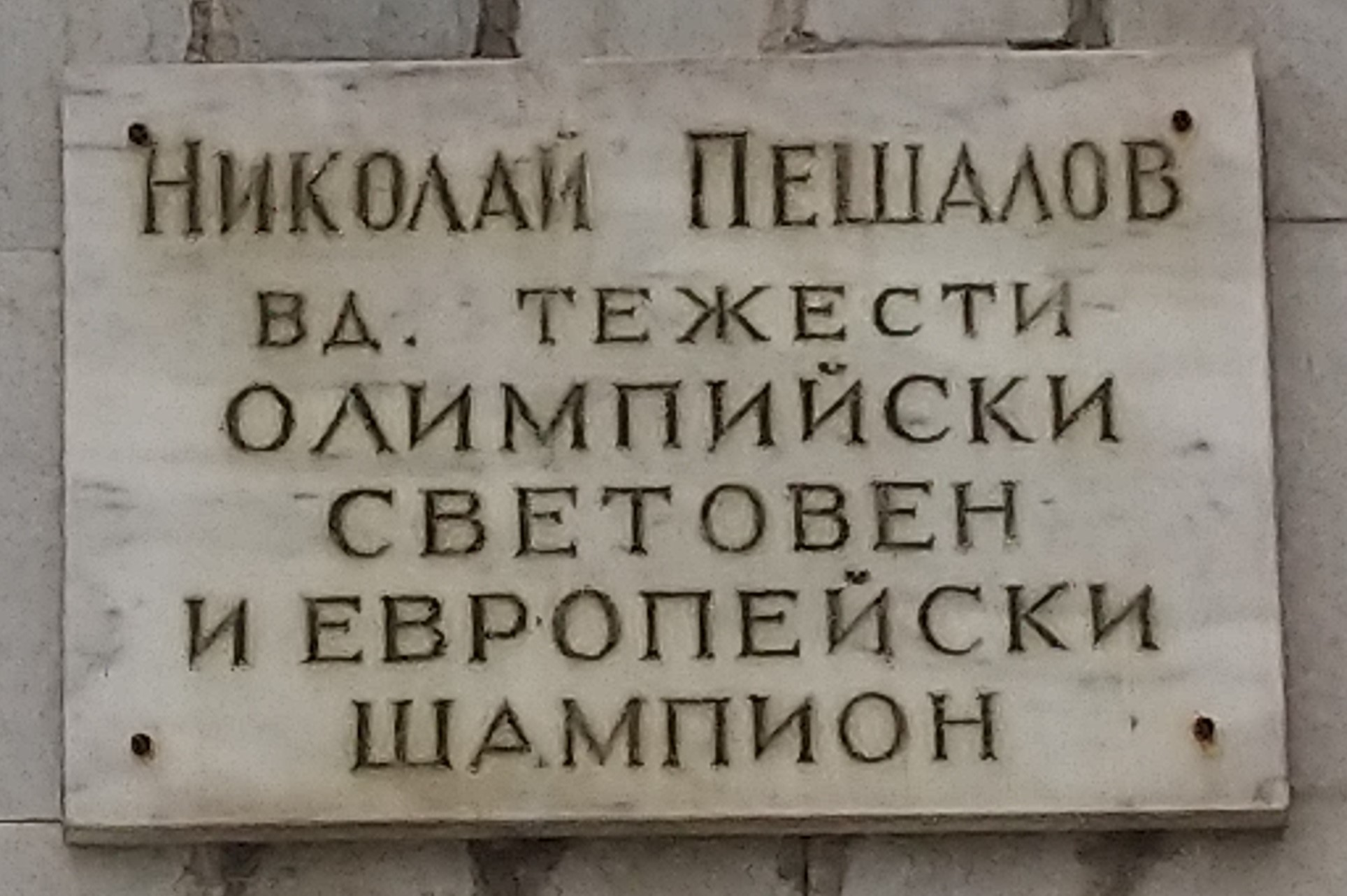
Nikolay Peshalov memorial plaque Pazardzhik.

Nikolay Peshalov (Bulgarian: Николай Славеев Пешалов, romanized: Nikolay Slaveev Peshalov; born on May 30, 1970) is a Bulgarian-born Croatian Olympic and World former champion in weightlifting.

During his long and successful career, Pešalov was World champion eight times in various categories and disciplines, and broke several world records. His Olympic medals are split between Bulgaria (1992 and 1996) and Croatia (2000 and 2004). In 2000 he was granted Croatian citizenship, and he now holds besides Bulgarian, a Croatian passport. He resides in both Sofia and Split.

== Further achievements ==
- Senior world champion (1990, 1993, 1994);
- Silver medalist in Senior World Championships (1989 and 1998);
- Bronze medalist in Senior World Championships (1995);
- Senior European champion (1991–1995, 1997, 2000, 2001);
- Silver medalist in Senior European Championships (1989, 1990, 2004);
- Set five world records during career.

== Major results ==
Year	Venue	Weight	Snatch (kg)				Clean & Jerk (kg)				Total	Rank
Year	Venue	Weight	1	2	3	Rank	1	2	3	Rank	Total	Rank
Olympic Games
1992	Barcelona, Spain	60 kg	132.5	~~137.5~~	137.5	2	~~162.5~~	162.5	167.5	2	305.0	2nd place, silver medalist(s)
1996	Atlanta, United States	59 kg	~~132.5~~	132.5	137.5	3	~~162.5~~	~~162.5~~	165.0	4	302.5	3rd place, bronze medalist(s)
2000	Sydney, Australia	62 kg	145.0	~~150.0~~	150.0	1	175.0	~~185.0~~	-	1	325.0	1st place, gold medalist(s)
2004	Athens, Greece	69 kg	~~150.0~~	150.0	~~155.0~~	3	182.5	187.5	~~192.5~~	1	337.5	3rd place, bronze medalist(s)

=== Weightlifting career bests ===
- Snatch: 150.0 kg in the class to 62 kg;
- Clean and jerk: 187.5 kg 2004 Summer Olympics in the class to 69 kg;
- Total: 312.5 kg (137.5 + 175.0) 1992 European Weightlifting Championships in the class to 60 kg;
- Total: 325.0 kg 2000 Summer Olympics in the class to 62 kg (Olympic record);
- Total: 337.5 kg 2004 Summer Olympics in the class to 69 kg.

=== World records ===
	unrecognized result (equalization of World Standard)
=	equalization of world record

Discipline		Result	Date and place
clean and jerk	-59kg	170kg	May 1995., Warsaw
biathlon	-62kg	325kg	Apr 2000., Sofia
biathlon	-62kg	325kg	Sep 2000., Sydney
