= Turkmen State Institute of Physical Education and Sports =

Sports university in Turkmenistan

Coordinates: 37.9187°N 58.3812°E

- Türkmen döwlet bedenterbiýe we sport instituty
- Former names: National Institute of Sports and Tourism of Turkmenistan; Türkmenistanyň milli sport we syýahatçylyk instituty
- Established: 1997
- Students: 1,600
- Location: Saparmyrat Türkmenbaşy şaýoly, 40-njy jaý Ashgabat 744013; Turkmenistan
- Campus: Urban
- Website: https://tdbsi.edu.tm/

The Turkmen State Institute of Physical Education and Sports (former National Institute of Sports and Tourism of Turkmenistan) (Turkmen: Türkmen döwlet bedenterbiýe we sport instituty) is a sports-oriented university in Turkmenistan, offering training of specialists in the fields of tourism, hospitality and sports.

Alladurdy Saryyev is the current rector.

== Structure ==
The colleges of the university are:

- Sports
- Tourism

=== Departments ===
- Sports medicine and biological support
- International experience
- Equestrian, gymnastics, athletics and swimming
- Turkmen national and sport games
- Goresh and martial arts
- Organization and management of tourism
- Hospitality management
- Theory and methodology of sports and biomechanics

== New building ==
The new building was built by Bouygues Turkmen in Ashgabat in April 2012. The Institute consists of a main 12-storey office tower flanked on the right and left by four-storey academic buildings, which house the auditorium, lecture halls, and a conference room. In the gymnasium are located on two floors volleyball, basketball, and handball courts, and mini football area. The new building of the university is designed to accommodate 1600 students.
