= José Luis Martínez (weightlifter) =

Spanish weightlifter

Personal information
- Full name: José Luis Martínez Ocaña
- Nationality: Spanish
- Born: 10 September 1968 (age 56); Girona, Spain

Sport
- Sport: Weightlifting

José Luis Martínez Ocaña (born 10 September 1968) is a Spanish weightlifter. He competed at the 1988 Summer Olympics and the 1992 Summer Olympics.
