= Sergey Kopytov =

Kazakhstani weightlifter (born 1965)

Personal information
- Nationality: Kazakhstani
- Born: 5 October 1965 (age 61)

Sport
- Sport: Weightlifting

Sergey Kopytov (born 5 October 1965) is a Kazakhstani weightlifter. He competed in the men's heavyweight I event at the 1996 Summer Olympics.
