= Eduard Darbinyan =

Armenian weightlifter

Eduard Darbinyan (Armenian: Էդուարդ Դարբինյան, born 17 January 1971 in Yerevan, Armenian SSR) is an Armenian retired weightlifter. He competed at the 1996 Summer Olympics in the men's 64 kg division.
