= Vyacheslav Rubin =

Russian weightlifter (born 1968)

Personal information
- Nationality: Russian
- Born: 16 February 1968 (age 58)

Sport
- Sport: Weightlifting

Vyacheslav Rubin (born 16 February 1968) is a Russian weightlifter. He competed in the men's heavyweight I event at the 1996 Summer Olympics.
