= Viktor Tregubov =

Russian weightlifter

Olympic medal record

Men's weightlifting

Olympic Games

Representing Unified Team
Gold medal – first place	1992 Barcelona	–100 kg

World Championships

Representing Russia
Gold medal – first place	1993 Melbourne	– 99 kg
Silver medal – second place	1994 Istanbul	– 99 kg

Viktor Nikolayevich Tregubov (Russian: Виктор Николаевич Трегубов) (born 13 April 1965 in Shakhty) is a Russian weightlifter, Olympic champion and world champion. He won a gold medal in the heavyweight 1 class at the 1992 Summer Olympics in Barcelona.
