= Francis Tournefier =

French weightlifter

Medal record

Men's Weightlifting

Representing France

World Championships
| Bronze medal – third place | 1991 Donaueschingen | – 100 kg |

European Championships
| Bronze medal – third place | 1990 Aalborg | – 100 kg |

Francis Tournefier (born February 28, 1964) is a French weightlifter.

He competed in the 100 kg class (at a bodyweight of 99.15 kg) at the 1988 Summer Olympics in Seoul, ranking fifth with a total of 385 kg.

At the 1990 European Championships he won bronze in the 100 kg category. He also won bronze in the 100 kg category at the 1991 World Championships.

At the 1992 Summer Olympics he ranked fourth in the 100 kg category, with a total of 387.5 kg.

== Personal best performances ==
- Snatch: 175.0 kg
- Clean and jerk: 220.0 kg

=== Squats ===
Francis was also known for his great squatting ability:

Francis has done 2 x 285.0 kg back squat and 1 x 295.0 kg back squat at 99 kg bodyweight (Showed in an ironmind video)

His personal bests are below:

- Front Squat: 270 kg
- Back Squat: 330 kg
