= Michael Schubert =

German weightlifter

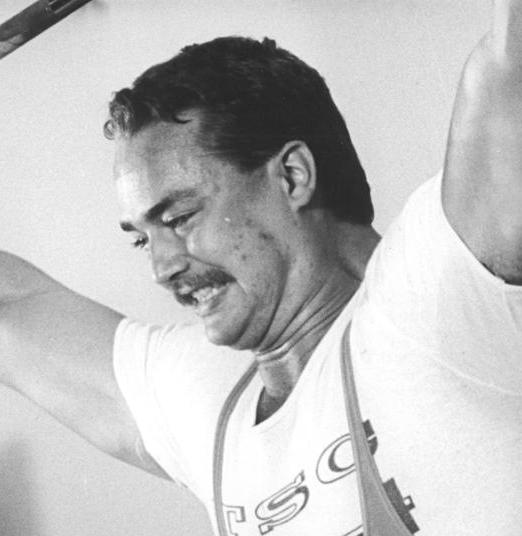
- Schubert in 1989

Personal information
- Born: 31 December 1967 (age 58) Berlin, Germany
- Height: 1.94 m (6 ft 4 in)
- Weight: 112 kg (247 lb)

Sport
- Sport: Weightlifting
- Club: Berliner TSC
Medal record
Representing East Germany
European & world championships
Bronze medal – third place	1989 Athens	Super heavyweight

Michael Schubert (born 31 December 1967) is a retired East German weightlifter. He competed in a heavyweight category at the 1988 Summer Olympics and finished in fourth place. He won two bronze medals at the combined European and world championships in 1989 by lifting 195 kg in the snatch and 230 kg in the clean & jerk.
