= Ingo Steinhöfel =

German weightlifter

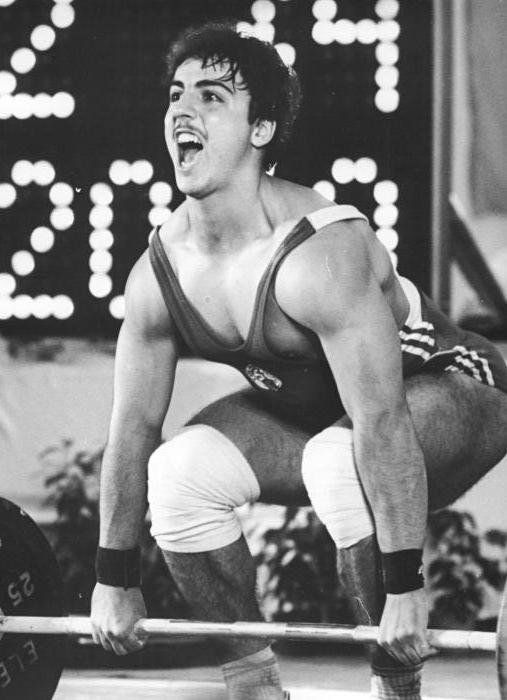
- Steinhöfel in 1989

Personal information
- Born: 29 May 1967 (age 59) Plauen, East Germany

Sport
- Sport: Olympic weightlifting

Achievements and titles
- Olympic finals: 1988 silver medal
Medal record
Ingo Steinhöfel
Medal record
Men's Olympic weightlifting
Olympic Games
Silver medal – second place	1988 Seoul	-75 kg

Ingo Steinhöfel (born 29 May 1967 in Plauen, Saxony, East Germany), is a former German weightlifter who competed at five Olympics from 1988 to 2004. He won a silver medal in the middleweight class at the 1988 Olympics.

He is, jointly with fellow (East) German Ronny Weller, the second weightlifter to compete at five Olympics. The first was Hungarian Imre Földi from 1960 to 1976.

At the world championships, he came 3rd in the 1987 middleweight class (345.0 kg), 3rd in the 1989 light-heavyweight class (377.5 kg) and 2nd in the 1994 middleweight class (362.5 kg).

At the European championships, he came 3rd in the 1989 light-heavyweight class (377.5 kg); 2nd in the 1997 middleweight class (350.0 kg).

== See also ==
- List of athletes with the most appearances at Olympic Games
