= Piotr Banaszak =

Polish weightlifter

Personal information
- Nationality: Polish
- Born: 20 March 1964 (age 61); Inowrocław, Poland

Sport
- Sport: Weightlifting

Piotr Banaszak (born 20 March 1964) is a Polish weightlifter. He competed in the men's heavyweight II event at the 1992 Summer Olympics.
