= Laurent Fombertasse =

French weightlifter (born 1968)

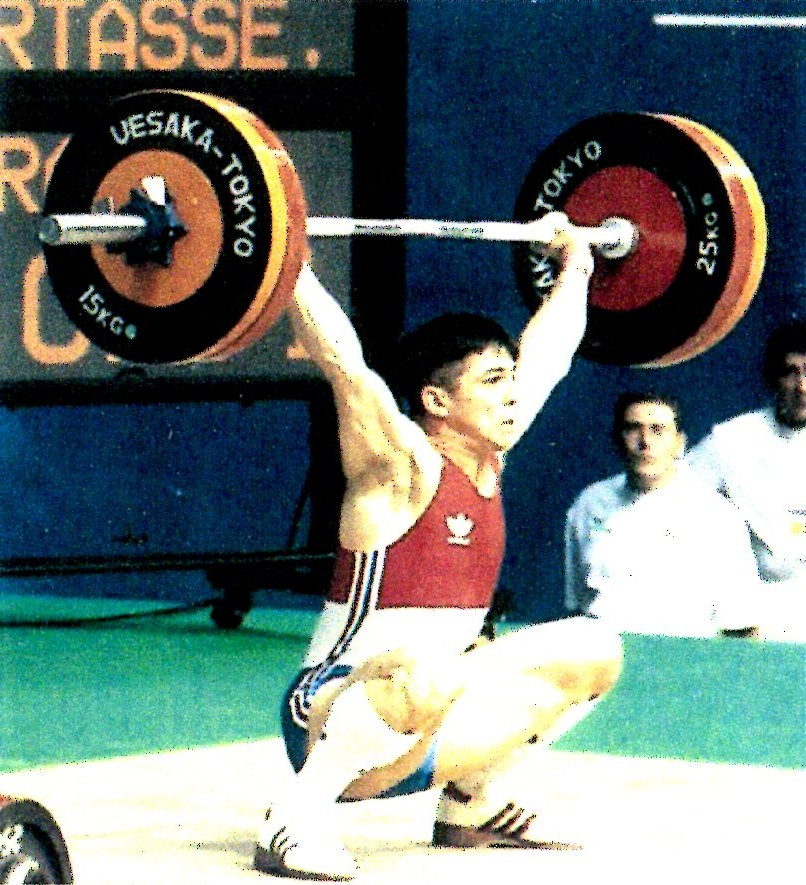
- Laurent Fombertasse in 1992

Personal information
- Nationality: French
- Born: 26 January 1968 (age 57) Évron, France

Sport
- Sport: Weightlifting

Laurent Fombertasse (born 26 January 1968) is a French weightlifter. He competed at the 1988 Summer Olympics and the 1992 Summer Olympics.
