= Tudor Casapu =

Moldovan weightlifter (born 1963)

Medal record

Representing Unified Team

Men's weightlifting

Olympic Games
Gold medal – first place	1992 Barcelona	-75 kg

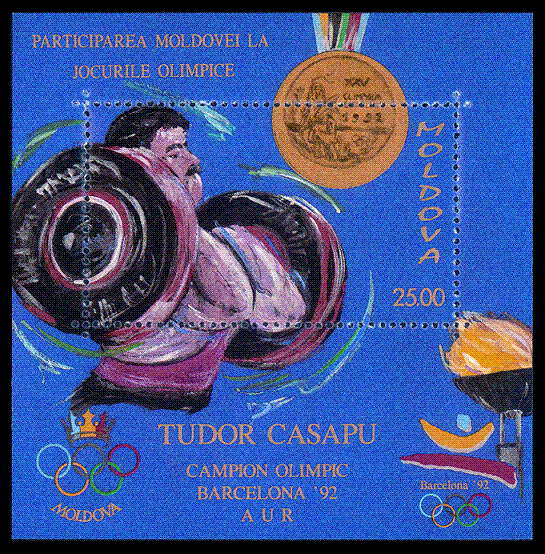
Tudor Casapu

Tudor Casapu (born 18 September 1963) is a Moldovan weightlifter, World Champion and Olympic Champion. He won a gold medal at the 1990 World Weightlifting Championships, and a gold medal at the 1992 Summer Olympics in Barcelona.
