= Sergiusz Wołczaniecki =

Polish weightlifter (born 1964)

Medal record

Representing Poland

Men's weightlifting

Olympic Games
Bronze medal – third place	1992 Barcelona	90 Kg

Sergiusz Wołczaniecki (born November 9, 1964, in Zaporizhzhia) is a Polish weightlifter. He won the Bronze medal in 90 Kg in the 1992 Summer Olympics in Barcelona.
