= Marek Gorzelniak =

Polish weightlifter

Personal information
- Nationality: Polish
- Born: 12 July 1968 (age 56); Legnica, Poland

Sport
- Sport: Weightlifting

Marek Gorzelniak (born 12 July 1968) is a Polish weightlifter. He competed at the 1992 Summer Olympics and the 1996 Summer Olympics.
