= Traian Cihărean =

Romanian weightlifter (born 1969)

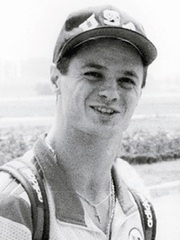

Personal information
- Born: 13 July 1969 (age 56) Bichigiu, Romania
- Height: 157 cm (5 ft 2 in)

Sport
- Sport: Weightlifting
Medal record
Representing Romania
Olympic Games
Bronze medal – third place	1992 Barcelona	-52 kg
World Championships
Bronze medal – third place	1989 Athens	-52 kg
European Championships
Silver medal – second place	1988 Cardiff	-52 kg
Silver medal – second place	1989 Athens	-52 kg
Gold medal – first place	1991 Władysławowo	-52 kg
Silver medal – second place	1990 Ålborg	-52 kg
Silver medal – second place	1992 Szekszárd	-52 kg
Bronze medal – third place	1996 Stavanger	-54 kg

Traian Ioachim Cihărean (born 13 July 1969) is a retired flyweight weightlifter from Romania. He competed at the 1988, 1992 and 1996 Olympics and won a bronze medal in 1992, placing fifth-sixth on other occasions. Cihărean won the European title in 1991 and finished third at the 1989 World Championships. His younger brother Marius is also a former Olympic weightlifter.
