= Altymyrat Orazdurdyýew =

Altimurat Orazdurdiev (Turkmen: Altymyrat Orazdurdyýew; June 16, 1969 – 1997) was a Turkmen weightlifter and an Honoured Master of Sports of the USSR.

== Early life ==
He was born in the Sakarçäge etrap (district) of Mary welayat (region), one of five brothers. He graduated from the National Institute of Sports and Tourism of Turkmenistan.

== Career ==
Orazdurdiev was coached by Abrahamian Brono. He performed for the "Dynamo" (Ashgabat).

He was the first Turkmen weightlifter to ever win the European Championship three times and has been recognized an equal number of times as the strongest man in the world. He performed in several 66–72 kg weight categories.

In 1992, he was a member of the United Team at the Olympic Games in Barcelona. However, head coach Vasily Alexeev did not allow him to compete.

A year after the Olympics he underwent a kidney transplant, but the transplant was rejected.

He won a gold medal at the 1994 Asian Games in the 76 kg class.

Orazdurdiev died in 1997 at the age of twenty-seven.
