= Andreas Behm =

German weightlifter (1962–2021)

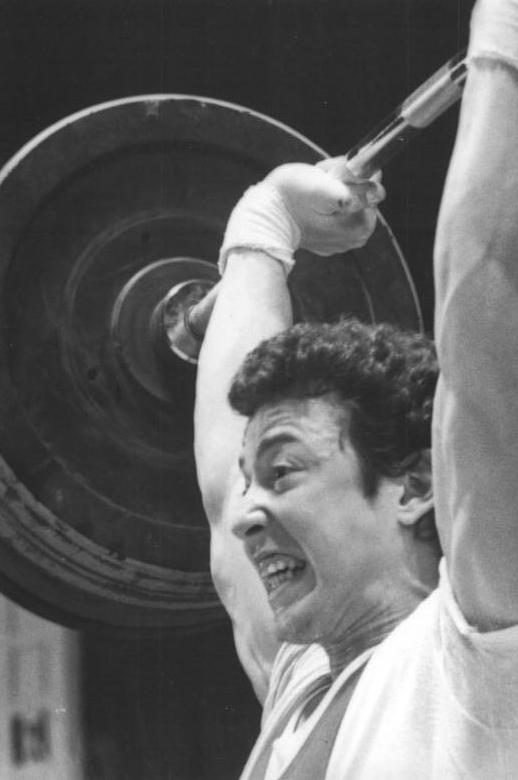
- Behm in 1985

Personal information
- Born: 28 November 1962 Stralsund, East Germany
- Died: 27 December 2021 (aged 59) Stralsund, Germany
- Height: 1.64 m (5 ft 5 in)
- Weight: 67.25 kg (148 lb)

Sport
- Sport: Weightlifting
- Club: TSV 1860 Stralsund
Medal record
Men's weightlifting
Representing Germany
Olympic Games
Bronze medal – third place	1992 Barcelona	-67.5; 145+175 kg
World Championships
Bronze medal – third place	1993 Melbourne	Lightweight; 145+185 kg
European Championships
Bronze medal – third place	1991 Wladyslawowo	Lightweight; 137.5+180 kg
Representing East Germany
World Championships
Silver medal – second place	1982 Ljubljana	Featherweight; 135+165 kg
Bronze medal – third place	1983 Moscow	Lightweight; 145+192.5 kg
Silver medal – second place	1987 Ostrava	Lightweight; 150+190 kg
European Championships
Bronze medal – third place	1981 Lille	Featherweight; 125+157.5 kg
Silver medal – second place	1982 Ljubljana	Featherweight; 135+165 kg
Bronze medal – third place	1983 Moscow	Lightweight; 145+192.5 kg
Gold medal – first place	1985 Katowice	Lightweight; 150+195 kg
Gold medal – first place	1986 Karl-Marx-Stadt	Lightweight; 152.5+195 kg
Bronze medal – third place	1989 Athens	Lightweight; 142.5+182.5 kg

Andreas Behm (28 November 1962 – 27 December 2021) was a German weightlifter.

Behm competed at the 1992 and 1996 Summer Olympics in the lightweight category and finished in third and tenth place, respectively. Between 1981 and 1993 he won two gold, three silver and six bronze medals at European and world championships. On 7 July 1984, he set three world records, one in clean & jerk and two in the total. He competed until age 36 and then worked as a coach.

He died from a heart attack on 27 December 2021, at the age of 59. His son Robby is also a weightlifter.
