= Andrew Davies (weightlifter) =

British weightlifter (born 1967)

Personal information
- Nationality: British
- Born: 17 July 1967 (age 59) Caldicot, Wales

Sport
- Sport: Weightlifting

Andrew Davies (born 17 July 1967) is a British weightlifter. He competed in the men's heavyweight II event at the 1988 Summer Olympics.
