= Manfred Nerlinger =

German weightlifter (born 1960)

Medal record

Men's Weightlifting

Representing West Germany

Olympic Games
Bronze medal – third place	1984 Los Angeles	+110 kg
Silver medal – second place	1988 Seoul	+110 kg

World Championships
Bronze medal – third place	1984 Los Angeles	+110 kg
Bronze medal – third place	1985 Södertälje	+110 kg
Silver medal – second place	1986 Sofia	+110 kg

European Championships
Bronze medal – third place	1988 Cardiff	+110 kg
Silver medal – second place	1990 Aalborg	+110 kg

Representing Germany

Olympic Games
Bronze medal – third place	1992 Barcelona	+110 kg

World Championships
Silver medal – second place	1991 Donaueschingen	+110 kg
Silver medal – second place	1993 Melbourne	+108 kg

European Championships
Gold medal – first place	1993 Sofia	+108 kg
Silver medal – second place	1991 Władysławowo	+110 kg
Silver medal – second place	1995 Warschau	+108 kg

Manfred Nerlinger (born 27 September 1960 in Munich, Bavaria) is a German former weightlifter, trainer and entrepreneur.

== Biography ==
He started with weightlifting in 1973. Competing in the superheavyweight category, he participated in four Summer Olympics, and won two bronze medals and one silver medal. Nerlinger participated in 11 World Championships, winning 3 medals in the snatch, 7 medals in the clean and jerk, 2 of them gold medals, and 5 medals in the combined competition.

He also participated in 10 European Championships, winning one medal in the snatch, 6 medals in the clean and jerk, one of them a gold medal, and 5 medals in the combined competition, one of them a gold medal. In 1993 he lifted a world record clean and jerk with 247.5 kg.

Nerlinger also lifted 37 German records. His personal bests were, before 1993: 197.5 kg snatch, 260.0 kg clean and jerk, 455.0 kg combined; after weight categories were changed in 1993: 192.5 kg snatch, 247.5 kg clean and jerk, 440.0 kg combined. Since 2000 he works as national youth trainer in the German weightlifting federation (BVDG). He also runs a shop selling weightlifting products.
