= Ivan Abadzhiev =

Bulgarian weightlifter (1932–2017)

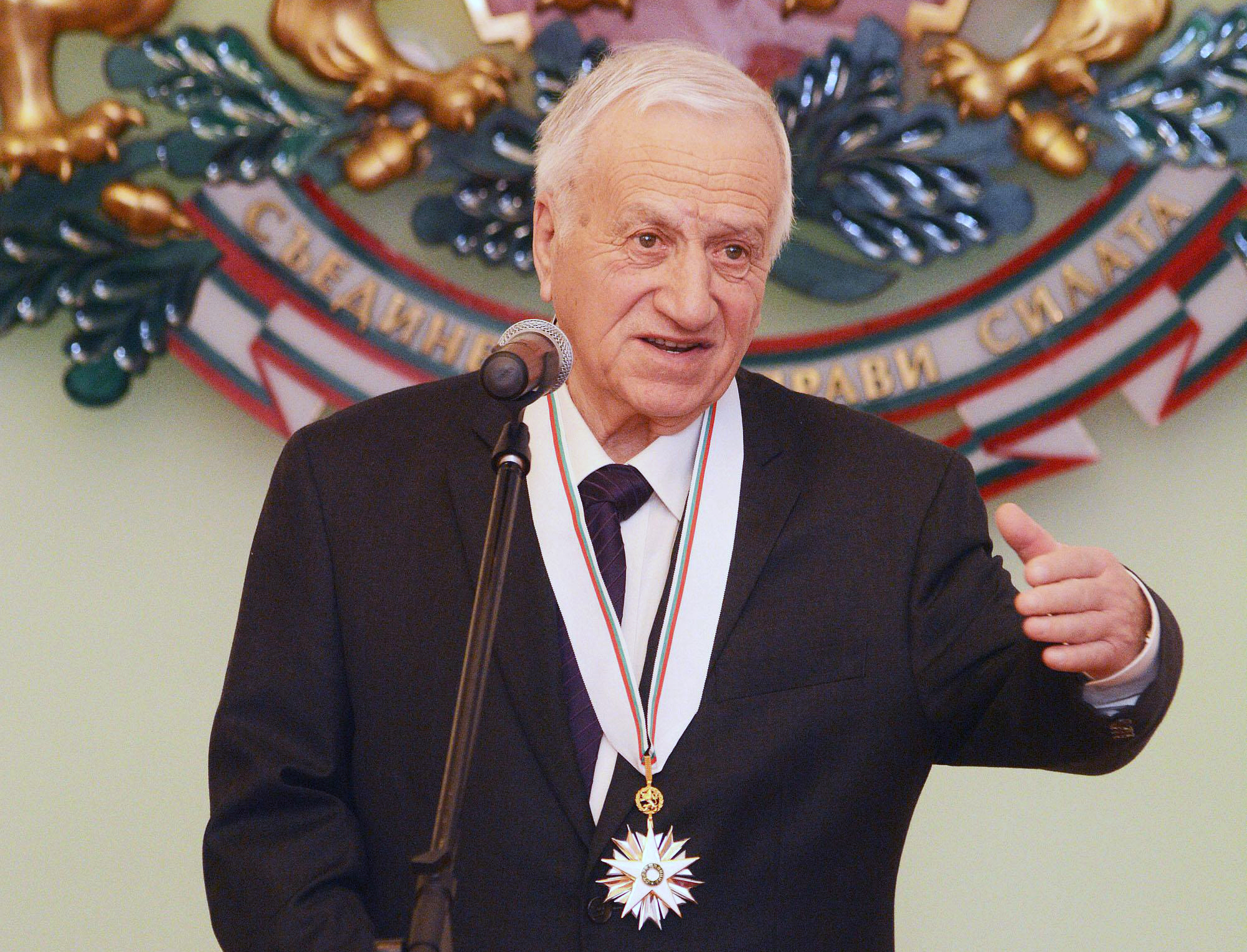

Personal information
- Full name: Ivan Nikolov Abadjiev
- Born: 12 February 1932 Novi Pazar, Bulgaria
- Died: 24 March 2017 (aged 85) Cologne, Germany
- Height: 1.64 m (5 ft 5 in)

Sport
- Country: Bulgaria
- Sport: Olympic weightlifting
Medal record
Men's Weightlifting
World Championships Total
Silver medal – second place	1957 Tehran	– 67.5 kg

Ivan Nikolov Abadjiev (Bulgarian: Иван Николов Абаджиев; 12 February 1932 – 24 March 2017) was a Bulgarian weightlifter and coach. As an active competitor, he won Bulgaria's first weightlifting medal in 1957.

From 1968 to 1989 and again from 1997 to 2000 he was the head coach of the Bulgarian Weightlifting Federation. He also spent a stint as the head Coach of the Turkish Weightlifting Federation during the late 1990s. During his career, Abadjiev produced 12 Olympic champions, 57 world champions and 64 European champions. He was called "The Pope of Weightlifting" for his great career as a coach of the Bulgarian national weightlifting team. Six times he was elected Coach of the Year of Bulgaria - 1985, 1986, 1989, 1997, 1998, 1999, and in 2001 was elected Coach of the 20th Century of the country. Olympic champions under the leadership of Abadjiev are: for Bulgaria - Norair Nurikyan, Yordan Bikov, Andon Nikolov (Munich 1972), Yordan Mitkov, Norair Nurikyan (Montreal 1976), Yanko Rusev, Asen Zlatev (Moscow 1980), Sevdalin Marinov, Borislav Gidikov (Seoul 1988), Galabin Boevski (Sydney 2000); for Turkey - Halil Mutlu, Naim Suleymanoglu (Atlanta 1996).

He was familiar with the works of Soviet Professor Felix Meerson. Abajiev developed his own system that dominated the sport at the time.
