= Waldemar Kosiński =

Polish weightlifter

Personal information
- Nationality: Polish
- Born: 17 March 1965 (age 60); Płońsk, Poland

Sport
- Sport: Weightlifting

Waldemar Kosiński (born 17 March 1965) is a Polish weightlifter. He competed in the men's middleweight event at the 1988 Summer Olympics.
