= Liu Shoubin =

Chinese weightlifter (born 1968)

Medal record

Representing China

Men's Olympic weightlifting

Olympic Games
Silver medal – second place	1992 Barcelona	56 kg
Bronze medal – third place	1988 Seoul	56 kg

Liu Shoubin (Chinese: 刘寿斌; born 3 March 1968) is a male Chinese weightlifter. He competed at 1988 Seoul Olympics, and won a bronze medal in Men's 52–56 kg. 4 years later, Liu won a silver medal at 1992 Barcelona Olympics in the same event.
