= Udo Guse =

German weightlifter

Personal information
- Nationality: German
- Born: 23 September 1967 (age 57); Stralsund, East Germany

Sport
- Sport: Weightlifting

Udo Guse (born 23 September 1967) is a German former weightlifter. He competed in the men's heavyweight I event at the 1992 Summer Olympics.
