= Petar Stefanov =

Bulgarian weightlifter (born 1966)

Personal information
- Full name: Petar Ivanov Stefanov
- Born: 22 June 1966 (age 60)
- Weight: 99 kg (218 lb)

Sport
- Country: Bulgaria
- Sport: Weightlifting
- Weight class: 100 kg
- Team: National team
Medal record
Men's Weightlifting
Representing Bulgaria
World Championships
Gold medal – first place	1989 Athens	100 kg
- Updated on 7 October 2016

Petar Ivanov Stefanov (Петър Иванов Стефанов, born 22 June 1966) is a Bulgarian male former weightlifter, who competed in the first heavyweight class and represented Bulgaria at international competitions. He won the gold medal at the 1989 World Weightlifting Championships in the 100 kg category. He participated at the 1992 Summer Olympics in the 100 kg event. He won the gold medal at the 1989 European Championships in the Sub-Heavyweight class (415.0 kg) and the bronze medal at the 1991 European Championships in the Sub-Heavyweight class (372.5 kg).
