= Sławomir Zawada =

Polish weightlifter

Personal information
- Born: March 18, 1965 (age 61) Więcbork, Kujawsko-Pomorskie, Poland
Medal record
Men's Weightlifting
Representing Poland
Olympic Games
Bronze medal – third place	1988 Seoul	90 Kg

Sławomir Zawada is a Polish weightlifter. He won a bronze medal in the 90 kg class at the 1988 Summer Olympics in Seoul.
