= Attila Czanka =

Romanian weightlifter

Personal information
- Nationality: Romanian
- Born: 1 May 1969 (age 55); Cluj-Napoca, Romania

Sport
- Sport: Weightlifting

Attila Czanka (born 1 May 1969) is a Romanian weightlifter. He competed in the men's featherweight event at the 1988 Summer Olympics. He also competed in the featherweight event at the 1992 Summer Olympics, representing Hungary.

== Major results ==
Year	Venue	Weight	Snatch (kg)					Clean & Jerk (kg)					Total	Rank
Year	Venue	Weight	1	2	3	Results	Rank	1	2	3	Results	Rank	Total	Rank
Representing Hungary
Olympic Games
1992	Barcelona, Spain	60 kg	127.5	~~132.5~~	~~135.0~~	127.5	7	157.5	~~160.0~~	~~160.0~~	157.5	7	285.0	7
Representing Romania
Olympic Games
1988	Seoul, South Korea	60 kg	~~130.0~~	~~130.0~~	~~130.0~~	—	—	—	—	—	—	—	—	—
