= Plamen Bratoychev =

Bulgarian weightlifter

Personal information
- Nationality: Bulgarian
- Born: 17 October 1966 (age 58); Knezha, Bulgaria

Sport
- Sport: Weightlifting

Plamen Bratoychev (Bulgarian: Пламен Братойчев, born 17 October 1966) is a Bulgarian weightlifter. He competed at the 1992 Summer Olympics and the 1996 Summer Olympics.
