= Krzysztof Siemion =

Polish weightlifter

Medal record

Representing Poland

Men's weightlifting

Olympic Games
Silver medal – second place	1992 Barcelona	82.5 Kg

Krzysztof Siemion (born 1 February 1966) is a Polish weightlifter. He won the Silver medal in 82.5 Kg in the 1992 Summer Olympics in Barcelona.
