= Israel Militosyan =

Soviet weightlifter

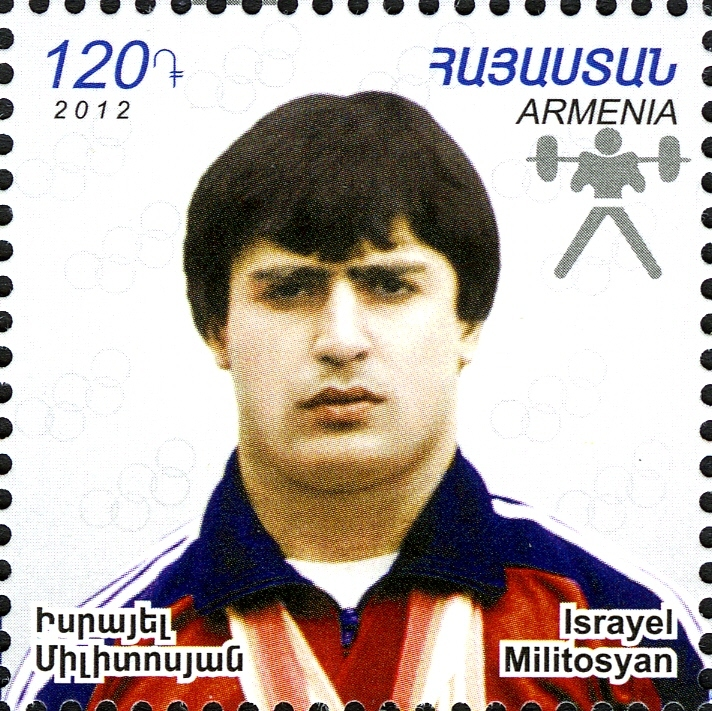

Personal information
- Born: 17 August 1968 (age 57) Leninakan, Armenian SSR, Soviet Union
- Height: 1.65 m (5 ft 5 in)
- Weight: 70 kg (154 lb)

Sport
- Sport: Weightlifting
- Club: Spartak Gyumri
Medal record
Representing the Soviet Union
Olympic Games
Silver medal – second place	1988 Seoul	-67.5 kg
World Championships
Bronze medal – third place	1987 Ostrava	-67.5 kg
Gold medal – first place	1989 Athens	-67.5 kg
Silver medal – second place	1991 Donaueschingen	-67.5 kg
European Championships
Silver medal – second place	1987 Reims	-67.5 kg
Gold medal – first place	1989 Athens	-67.5 kg
Silver medal – second place	1990 Aalborg	-67.5 kg
Silver medal – second place	1991 Władysławowo	-67.5 kg
Representing the CIS
European Championships
Silver medal – second place	1992 Szekszárd	-67.5 kg
Representing the Unified Team
Olympic Games
Gold medal – first place	1992 Barcelona	-67.5 kg
USSR Weightlifting Championships
Gold medal – first place	1989 Frunze	-67.5 kg
Gold medal – first place	1991 Donetsk	-67.5 kg
Summer Spartakiad of the USSR
Gold medal – first place	1991 Donetsk	-67.5 kg
Cups of the USSR
Gold medal – first place	1977 Ryazan	-75 kg Snatch
Gold medal – first place	1977 Ryazan	-75 kg Clean and Jerk
Gold medal – first place	1977 Ryazan	-75 kg Total
Gold medal – first place	1984 Zaporizhia	-60 kg Total

Israel Militosyan (Armenian: Իսրայել Միլիտոսյան, born 17 August 1968) is an Armenian former weightlifter. He was awarded the Honoured Master of Sports of the USSR title in 1989.

== Early life ==
Born in Leninakan, Armenian SSR (now Gyumri, Armenia), a city famous for its world class weightlifters, Militosyan took up weightlifting in 1980 under the guidance of cousin Vardan Militosyan and joined the Soviet national team in 1987.

== Career ==
Militosyan was one of the top weightlifters of his era. He made his Olympic debut at the 1988 Summer Olympics in Seoul. He won a silver medal in the lightweight (67.5 kg) class with a total of 337.5 kg, only 2.5 kg behind gold medalist Joachim Kunz. Despite the defeat, Militosyan set a new Olympic record in the snatch at 155 kg.

The following year, Militosyan became both a European and a World Champion by winning gold medal at the 1989 European Weightlifting Championships and 1989 World Weightlifting Championships. At the World Weightlifting Championships in Athens, Militosyan set the world record in the snatch at 158.5 kg and then, in his next lift, broke his own world record at 160 kg.

Militosyan would come in second to rival Yoto Yotov at the next three European Weightlifting Championships and at the 1991 World Weightlifting Championships. As such, Yotov was considered the gold medal favorite at the up-coming Olympics and Militosyan was expected to repeat his silver medal achievement.

Though the Soviet Union was disbanded, Militosyan and the other Soviet Olympians still competed together under the Unified Team at the 1992 Summer Olympics in Barcelona. In the snatch, Militosyan lifted 155 kg, breaking his own previous Olympic record (150 kg), and lifted 182.5 kg in the clean and jerk, setting an Olympic total of 337.5 kg yet again and this time winning the Olympic gold medal, defeating silver medalist Yotov by 10 kg. To this day, Militosyan is the last Armenian weightlifter to become an Olympic Champion.

Following the 1992 Olympics, Militosyan began representing his native Armenia.

Militosyan set the world record in the snatch for a third time in 1994 at the 1994 European Weightlifting Championships in Sokolov. the weight limit change. Militosyan is the first weightlifter from the independent Armenia to set a world record in weightlifting. Militosyan represented Armenia in its Olympic debut at the 1996 Summer Olympics, where he came in sixth place.

Militosyan retired from weightlifting in 1999 and later worked as a weightlifting coach in his hometown of Gyumri.

== Personal life ==
Israel is a cousin and student of fellow Soviet-Armenian Olympic weightlifting medalist Vardan Militosyan. Vardan was the first Soviet-Armenian to win an Olympic medal in weightlifting, and Israel was the last.
