= Yoto Yotov =

Bulgarian weightlifter (born 1969)

Personal information
- Born: May 22, 1969 (age 57)
Medal record
Men's Weightlifting
Representing Bulgaria
Olympic Games
Silver medal – second place	1992 Barcelona	-67.5 kg
Silver medal – second place	1996 Atlanta	-76 kg
World Championships
Gold medal – first place	1991 Donaueschingen	67,5 kg
Gold medal – first place	1993 Melbourne	70 kg
Gold medal – first place	1997 Chiang Mai	76 kg
Silver medal – second place	1989 Athens	67,5 kg
Silver medal – second place	1990 Budapest	67,5 kg
Silver medal – second place	1994 Istanbul	70 kg
Silver medal – second place	1995 Guangzhou	76 kg
European Championships
Gold medal – first place	1990 Aalborg	67,5 kg
Gold medal – first place	1991 Wladyslawowo	67,5 kg
Gold medal – first place	1992 Szekszard	67,5 kg
Gold medal – first place	1993 Sofia	70 kg
Gold medal – first place	1994 Sokolov	70 kg
Gold medal – first place	1997 Rijeka	76 kg
Silver medal – second place	1989 Athens	67,5 kg
IWF World Cup Winner
Gold medal – first place	1991 Barcelona	67,5 kg
IWF World Cup Final
Silver medal – second place	1991 Barcelona	67,5 kg
Silver medal – second place	1992 Beijing	67,5 kg
Bronze medal – third place	1994 Thessaloniki	70 kg
IWF World Cup
Gold medal – first place	1989 Burgas	75 kg
Gold medal – first place	1990 Varna	75 kg
Gold medal – first place	1991 Varna	67,5 kg
Silver medal – second place	1990 Melbourne	67,5 kg
Goodwill Games
Bronze medal – third place	1990 Seattle	67,5 Total
Bronze medal – third place	1990 Seattle	67,5 Snatch
Bronze medal – third place	1990 Seattle	67,5 Clean and Jerk
Friendship Cup
Silver medal – second place	1988 Talin	75 kg
Junior World Championships
Gold medal – first place	1989 Fort Lauderdale	67,5 kg
Silver medal – second place	1988 Athens	67,5 kg
Junior European Championships
Silver medal – second place	1988 Athens	67,5 kg
Bulgarian Team Championships
Gold medal – first place	1990 Dobrich	75 kg

Yoto Vasilev Yotov (Bulgarian: Йото Василев Йотов, born May 22, 1969) is a Bulgarian weightlifter. Yotov is one of the greatest Bulgarian weightlifters of all time. He is a two-time Olympic silver medalist, three-time world champion, six-time European champion, winner of the 1991 World Cup. Holds a total of 51 medals from the Olympic Games, World and European Championships in total, snatch and clean and jerk - 22 gold, 22 silver and 7 bronze. Because of his long career and many medals, he has been called the Professor. He was voted Sportsperson of the Year of Bulgaria for 1997. In 2020 he was awarded the highest state honors of Bulgaria in the field of sports - the Wreath of the winner. He began training in 1984. He has competed for the clubs Minor Pernik, Levski and Dobrich. At the 1988 World and European Junior Championships in Athens became second. A year later in Fort Lauderdale, USA, he became the World Junior Champion. Following is a great career for men with three world titles, six European titles and two silver medals from the Olympics, as well as many other medals from major championships. Among them three bronze medals from the Goodwill Games in 1990 in Seattle. At the end of his career, he competed for Croatia but did not win medals.

Yotov was competing as recently as October 2006. He represented Croatia in the Men's 85 kg class. He placed 17th with a snatch of 150 kg and jerk of 190 kg for a total of 340 kg.

== Weightlifting achievements ==
- Silver medalist in Olympic Games (1992 and 1996);
- Senior world champion (1991, 1993, 1997);
- Silver medalist in Senior World Championships (1989, 1990, 1994, 1995);
- Senior European champion (1990–1994, 1997);
- Silver medalist in Senior European Championships (1989).
- IWF World Cup Winner (1991)
- Silver medalist from IWF World Cup Final (1991, 1992)
- Bronze medalist from IWF World Cup Final (1994)
- Three bronze medals from the Goodwill Games (1990)
- Sportsperson of the Year Bulgaria (1997)
- Wreath of the Winner Bulgaria (2020)
- Junior World Champion (1989)
- Junior World Vice-Champion (1988)
- Junior European Vice-Champion (1988)
- Silver medalist from Friendship Cup (1988)

== Notes ==
- Called "The Professor" because of his medals over a long timespan in a sport usually dominated by younger athletes.
