= Weightlifting at the Friendship Games =

1984 event held in Bulgaria

Weightlifting at the Friendship Games was contested at the Palace of Culture and Sports in Varna, Bulgaria between 12 and 16 September 1984. 80 athletes competed in 10 events (all men's individual).

World records were broken thirty times during the competition.

== Medal summary ==
Event	Gold	Silver	Bronze
Flyweight –52 kg	Neno Terziyski (BUL)	Béla Oláh (HUN)	Hoi Zong Sou (PRK)
Bantamweight; 56 kg	Naim Suleimanov (BUL)	Oksen Mirzoyan (URS)	Gabriel Enseñat (CUB)
Featherweight; 60 kg	Stefan Topurov (BUL)	Yurik Sarkisyan (URS)	Anton Kodzabashev (BUL)
Lightweight; 67.5 kg	Yanko Rusev (BUL)	Aleksandar Varbanov (BUL)	Marek Seweryn (POL)
Middleweight; 75 kg	Zdravko Stoichkov (BUL)	Vladimir Kuznetsov (URS)	István Messzi (HUN)
Light-heavyweight; 82.5 kg	Yurik Vardanyan (URS)	Asen Zlatev (BUL)	László Király (HUN)
Middle-heavyweight; 90 kg	Viktor Solodov (URS)	Blagoy Blagoev (BUL)	Andrzej Piotrowski (POL)
First-heavyweight; 100 kg	Pavel Kuznetsov (URS)	Andor Szanyi (HUN)	Miloš Čiernik (TCH)
Heavyweight; 110 kg	Leonid Taranenko (URS)	Yury Zakharevitch (URS)	Yanko Georgiev (BUL)
Super heavyweight +110 kg	Anatoly Pisarenko (URS)	Aleksandr Kurlovich (URS)	Robert Skolimowski (POL)

== Details ==
List of top three results in every category.

=== Flyweight ===
Rank	Name	Snatch (kg)	Clean and Jerk (kg)	Total (kg)
Gold medal	Neno Terziyski (BUL)	112.5	140	252.5
Silver medal	Béla Oláh (HUN)	105	127.5	232.5
Bronze medal	Hoi Zong Sou (PRK)	95	132.5	227.5

=== Bantamweight ===
Rank	Name	Snatch (kg)	Clean and Jerk (kg)	Total (kg)
Gold medal	Naim Suleimanov (BUL)	132.5	165	297.5
Silver medal	Oksen Mirzoyan (URS)	132.5	162.5	295
Bronze medal	Gabriel Ensebat (CUB)	100	130	230

=== Featherweight ===
Rank	Name	Snatch (kg)	Clean and Jerk (kg)	Total (kg)
Gold medal	Stefan Topurov (BUL)	140	182.5	322.5
Silver medal	Yurik Sarkisyan (URS)	140	175	315
Bronze medal	Anton Kodzabashev (BUL)	130	165	295

=== Lightweight ===
Rank	Name	Snatch (kg)	Clean and Jerk (kg)	Total (kg)
Gold medal	Yanko Rusev (BUL)	145	192.5	337.5
Silver medal	Aleksandar Varbanov (BUL)	145	190	335
Bronze medal	Marek Seweryn (POL)	142.5	172.5	315

=== Middleweight ===
Rank	Name	Snatch (kg)	Clean and Jerk (kg)	Total (kg)
Gold medal	Zdravko Stoichkov (BUL)	167.5	210	377.5
Silver medal	Vladimir Kuznetsov (URS)	162.5	200	362.5
Bronze medal	István Messzi (HUN)	155	185	340

=== Light-heavyweight ===
Rank	Name	Snatch (kg)	Clean and Jerk (kg)	Total (kg)
Gold medal	Yurik Vardanyan (URS)	182.5	222.5	405
Silver medal	Asen Zlatev (BUL)	175	210	385
Bronze medal	László Király (HUN)	167.5	202.5	370

=== Middle-heavyweight ===
Rank	Name	Snatch (kg)	Clean and Jerk (kg)	Total (kg)
Gold medal	Viktor Solodov (URS)	190	232.5	422.5
Silver medal	Blagoy Blagoev (BUL)	185	215	400
Bronze medal	Andrzej Piotrowski (POL)	170	205	375

=== First-heavyweight ===
Rank	Name	Snatch (kg)	Clean and Jerk (kg)	Total (kg)
Gold medal	Pavel Kuznetsov (URS)	187.5	240	427.5
Silver medal	Andor Szanyi (HUN)	175	215	390
Bronze medal	Milos Čiernik (TCH)	170	215	385

=== Heavyweight ===
Rank	Name	Snatch (kg)	Clean and Jerk (kg)	Total (kg)
Gold medal	Leonid Taranenko (URS)	200	242.5	442.5
Silver medal	Yury Zakharevitch (URS)	197.5	230	427.5
Bronze medal	Yanko Georgiev (BUL)	182.5	230	412.5

=== Super heavyweight ===
Rank	Name	Snatch (kg)	Clean and Jerk (kg)	Total (kg)
Gold medal	Anatoly Pisarenko (URS)	200	265	465
Silver medal	Aleksandr Kurlovich (URS)	210	252.5	462.5
Bronze medal	Robert Skolimowski (POL)	190	225	415

== World records broken ==
World records were broken thirty times. Some were beaten "off competition" after the competition ended. Often, records were broken multiple times in one category. In such case, only the final record is listed here.

Event	Name	Nationality	Result
Bantamweight – Clean & Jerk	Naim Suleimanov	Bulgaria	170.5 kg
Featherweight – Clean & jerk	Stefan Topurov	Bulgaria	185 kg
Featherweight – Total	Stefan Topurov	Bulgaria	322.5 kg
Lightweight – Clean & Jerk	Aleksandar Varbanov	Bulgaria	200 kg
Middleweight – Clean & Jerk	Zdravko Stoichkov	Bulgaria	211 kg
Middleweight – Total	Zdravko Stoichkov	Bulgaria	377.5 kg
Light-heavyweight – Snatch	Yurik Vardanyan	Soviet Union	182.5 kg
Light-heavyweight – Clean & Jerk	Yurik Vardanyan	Soviet Union	224 kg
Light-heavyweight – Total	Yurik Vardanyan	Soviet Union	405 kg
Middle-heavyweight – Clean & Jerk	Viktor Solodov	Soviet Union	233 kg
Middle-heavyweight – Total	Viktor Solodov	Soviet Union	422.5 kg
First-heavyweight – Clean & Jerk	Pavel Kuznetsov	Soviet Union	241.5 kg
Heavyweight – Snatch	Yury Zakharevitch	Soviet Union	200.5 kg
Heavyweight – Total	Leonid Taranenko	Soviet Union	442.5 kg
Super heavyweight – Clean & Jerk	Anatoly Pisarenko	Soviet Union	265 kg
Super heavyweight – Total	Anatoly Pisarenko	Soviet Union	465 kg

== Medal table ==
* Host nation (Bulgaria)

Rank	Nation	Gold	Silver	Bronze	Total
1	Soviet Union (URS)	5	5	0	10
2	Bulgaria (BUL)*	5	3	2	10
3	Hungary (HUN)	0	2	2	4
4	Poland (POL)	0	0	3	3
5	Cuba (CUB)	0	0	1	1
5	Czechoslovakia (TCH)	0	0	1	1
5	North Korea (PRK)	0	0	1	1
Totals (7 entries)		10	10	10	30

== See also ==
- Weightlifting at the 1984 Summer Olympics
