= 1983 European Weightlifting Championships =

International weightlifting competition

1983 European Championships

The 1983 European Weightlifting Championships were held at the Izmailovo Sports Palace in Moscow, Soviet Union from October 22 to October 31, 1983. This was the 62nd edition of the event. There were 123 men in action from 21 nations. This tournament was a part of 1983 World Weightlifting Championships.

== Medal summary ==
Event	Gold		Silver		Bronze	
52 kg
Snatch	Neno Terziyski; Bulgaria	115.0 kg	Jacek Gutowski; Poland	112.5 kg	Béla Oláh; Hungary	107.5 kg
Clean & Jerk	Neno Terziyski; Bulgaria	145.0 kg	Stefan Leletko; Poland	140.0 kg	Jacek Gutowski; Poland	137.5 kg
Total	Neno Terziyski; Bulgaria	260.0 kg WR	Jacek Gutowski; Poland	250.0 kg	Stefan Leletko; Poland	247.5 kg
56 kg
Snatch	Naim Suleymanov; Bulgaria	130.0 kg WR	Oksen Mirzoyan; Soviet Union	127.5 kg	Andreas Letz; East Germany	120.0 kg
Clean & Jerk	Oksen Mirzoyan; Soviet Union	165.0 kg WR	Andreas Letz; East Germany	160.0 kg	Naim Suleymanov; Bulgaria	160.0 kg
Total	Oksen Mirzoyan; Soviet Union	292.5 kg WR	Naim Suleymanov; Bulgaria	290.0 kg	Andreas Letz; East Germany	280.0 kg
60 kg
Snatch	Yurik Sarkisyan; Soviet Union	137.5 kg	Marek Seweryn; Poland	135.0 kg	Stefan Topurov; Bulgaria	132.5 kg
Clean & Jerk	Stefan Topurov; Bulgaria	180.0 kg WR	Yurik Sarkisyan; Soviet Union	175.0 kg	Gelu Radu; Romania	162.5 kg
Total	Yurik Sarkisyan; Soviet Union	312.5 kg WR	Stefan Topurov; Bulgaria	312.5 kg	Gelu Radu; Romania	292.5 kg
67.5 kg
Snatch	Yanko Rusev; Bulgaria	145.0 kg	Andreas Behm; East Germany	145.0 kg	Joachim Kunz; East Germany	145.0 kg
Clean & Jerk	Joachim Kunz; East Germany	195.0 kg	Yanko Rusev; Bulgaria	192.5 kg	Andreas Behm; East Germany	192.5 kg
Total	Joachim Kunz; East Germany	340.0 kg	Yanko Rusev; Bulgaria	337.5 kg	Andreas Behm; East Germany	337.5 kg
75 kg
Snatch	Vladimir Kuznetsov; Soviet Union	167.5 kg WR	Aleksandar Varbanov; Bulgaria	160.0 kg	Dragomir Cioroslan; Romania	157.5 kg
Clean & Jerk	Aleksandar Varbanov; Bulgaria	210.0 kg WR	Zdravko Stoichkov; Bulgaria	207.5 kg	Vladimir Kuznetsov; Soviet Union	202.5 kg
Total	Aleksandar Varbanov; Bulgaria	370.0 kg	Vladimir Kuznetsov; Soviet Union	370.0 kg WR	Zdravko Stoichkov; Bulgaria	362.5 kg
82.5 kg
Snatch	Asen Zlatev; Bulgaria	180.0 kg	Yurik Vardanyan; Soviet Union	180.0 kg	László Barsi; Hungary	165.0 kg
Clean & Jerk	Yurik Vardanyan; Soviet Union	212.5 kg	Asen Zlatev; Bulgaria	210.0 kg	Lubomír Vymazal; Czechoslovakia	210.0 kg
Total	Yurik Vardanyan; Soviet Union	392.5 kg	Asen Zlatev; Bulgaria	390.0 kg	László Barsi; Hungary	370.0 kg
90 kg
Snatch	Blagoy Blagoev; Bulgaria	190.0 kg	Viktor Solodov; Soviet Union	185.0 kg	Andrzej Piotrowski; Poland	170.0 kg
Clean & Jerk	Blagoy Blagoev; Bulgaria	227.5 kg	Viktor Solodov; Soviet Union	225.0 kg	Andrzej Piotrowski; Poland	212.5 kg
Total	Blagoy Blagoev; Bulgaria	417.5 kg	Viktor Solodov; Soviet Union	410.0 kg	Andrzej Piotrowski; Poland	382.5 kg
100 kg
Snatch	Aleksandr Popov; Soviet Union	187.5 kg	Pavel Kuznetsov; Soviet Union	182.5 kg	Vasile Groapă; Romania	180.0 kg
Clean & Jerk	Pavel Kuznetsov; Soviet Union	240.0 kg	Aleksandr Popov; Soviet Union	235.0 kg	Andrzej Komar; Poland	227.5 kg
Total	Pavel Kuznetsov; Soviet Union	422.5 kg	Aleksandr Popov; Soviet Union	422.5 kg	Andrzej Komar; Poland	407.5 kg
110 kg
Snatch	Vyacheslav Klokov; Soviet Union	192.5 kg	József Jacsó; Hungary	185.0 kg	Ștefan Tașnadi; Romania	182.5 kg
Clean & Jerk	Vyacheslav Klokov; Soviet Union	247.5 kg WR	József Jacsó; Hungary	225.0 kg	Anton Baraniak; Czechoslovakia	220.0 kg
Total	Vyacheslav Klokov; Soviet Union	440.0 kg WR	József Jacsó; Hungary	410.0 kg	Anton Baraniak; Czechoslovakia	400.0 kg
+110 kg
Snatch	Anatoly Pisarenko; Soviet Union	205.0 kg	Aleksandr Kurlovich; Soviet Union	205.0 kg	Pavel Khek; Czechoslovakia	197.5 kg
Clean & Jerk	Anatoly Pisarenko; Soviet Union	245.0 kg	Aleksandr Kurlovich; Soviet Union	245.0 kg	Antonio Krastev; Bulgaria	237.5 kg
Total	Anatoly Pisarenko; Soviet Union	450.0 kg	Aleksandr Kurlovich; Soviet Union	450.0 kg	Antonio Krastev; Bulgaria	427.5 kg

== Medal table ==
Ranking by Big (Total result) medals

Rank	Nation	Gold	Silver	Bronze	Total
1	Soviet Union (URS)	6	4	0	10
2	Bulgaria (BUL)	3	4	2	9
3	East Germany (GDR)	1	0	2	3
4	Poland (POL)	0	1	3	4
5	Hungary (HUN)	0	1	1	2
6	Czechoslovakia (TCH)	0	0	1	1
6	Romania (ROU)	0	0	1	1
Totals (7 entries)		10	10	10	30
