= 1984 European Weightlifting Championships =

Africa culture

1984 European Championships

The 1984 European Weightlifting Championships were held in Vitoria, Spain from April 26 to May 1, 1984. This was the 63rd edition of the event. There were 142 men in action from 26 nations.

== Medal summary ==
| Event | Gold | | Silver | | Bronze | |
52 kg
| Snatch | Bernard Piekorz; Poland | 110.0 kg | Jacek Gutowski; Poland | 110.0 kg | Neno Terziyski; Bulgaria | 110.0 kg |
| Clean & Jerk | Neno Terziyski; Bulgaria | 152.5 kg WR | Bernard Piekorz; Poland | 132.5 kg | Jacek Gutowski; Poland | 132.5 kg |
| Total | Neno Terziyski; Bulgaria | 262.5 kg WR | Bernard Piekorz; Poland | 242.5 kg | Jacek Gutowski; Poland | 242.5 kg |
56 kg
| Snatch | Naum Shalamanov; Bulgaria | 130.0 kg | Frank Mavius; East Germany | 120.0 kg | Gheorghe Maftei; Romania | 115.0 kg |
| Clean & Jerk | Naum Shalamanov; Bulgaria | 167.5 kg | Oksen Mirzoyan; Soviet Union | 165.0 kg | Frank Mavius; East Germany | 147.5 kg |
| Total | Naum Shalamanov; Bulgaria | 297.5 kg WR | Frank Mavius; East Germany | 267.5 kg | Gheorghe Maftei; Romania | 260.0 kg |
60 kg
| Snatch | Yurik Sarkisyan; Soviet Union | 137.5 kg | Stefan Topurov; Bulgaria | 137.5 kg WR | Anton Kodzhabashev; Bulgaria | 135.0 kg |
| Clean & Jerk | Stefan Topurov; Bulgaria | 177.5 kg | Yurik Sarkisyan; Soviet Union | 175.0 kg | Anton Kodzhabashev; Bulgaria | 172.5 kg |
| Total | Stefan Topurov; Bulgaria | 315.0 kg WR | Yurik Sarkisyan; Soviet Union | 312.5 kg | Anton Kodzhabashev; Bulgaria | 307.5 kg |
67.5 kg
| Snatch | Vladimir Grachev; Soviet Union | 152.5 kg | Jouni Grönman; Finland | 140.0 kg | Miroslaw Chlebosz; Poland | 140.0 kg |
| Clean & Jerk | Georgi Petrikov; Bulgaria | 185.0 kg | Jouni Grönman; Finland | 175.0 kg | Miroslaw Chlebosz; Poland | 170.0 kg |
| Total | Georgi Petrikov; Bulgaria | 325.0 kg | Jouni Grönman; Finland | 315.0 kg | Miroslaw Chlebosz; Poland | 310.0 kg |
75 kg
| Snatch | Vladimir Kuznetsov; Soviet Union | 165.0 kg | Zdravko Stoichkov; Bulgaria | 165.0 kg | Aleksandar Varbanov; Bulgaria | 160.0 kg |
| Clean & Jerk | Aleksandar Varbanov; Bulgaria | 207.5 kg | Karl-Heinz Radschinsky; West Germany | 205.0 kg | Zdravko Stoichkov; Bulgaria | 205.0 kg |
| Total | Zdravko Stoichkov; Bulgaria | 370.0 kg | Aleksandar Varbanov; Bulgaria | 367.5 kg | Vladimir Kuznetsov; Soviet Union | 367.5 kg |
82.5 kg
| Snatch | Anatoly Khrapaty; Soviet Union | 175.0 kg | Asen Zlatev; Bulgaria | 175.0 kg | Yurik Vardanyan; Soviet Union | 172.5 kg |
| Clean & Jerk | Yurik Vardanyan; Soviet Union | 220.0 kg | Asen Zlatev; Bulgaria | 220.0 kg | Anatoly Khrapaty; Soviet Union | 215.0 kg |
| Total | Asen Zlatev; Bulgaria | 395.0 kg | Yurik Vardanyan; Soviet Union | 392.5 kg | Anatoly Khrapaty; Soviet Union | 390.0 kg |
90 kg
| Snatch | Blagoy Blagoev; Bulgaria | 192.5 kg | Viktor Solodov; Soviet Union | 187.5 kg | Andrzej Piotrowski; Poland | 172.5 kg |
| Clean & Jerk | Viktor Solodov; Soviet Union | 232.5 kg WR | Blagoy Blagoev; Bulgaria | 225.0 kg | Lubomír Vymazal; Czechoslovakia | 217.5 kg |
| Total | Viktor Solodov; Soviet Union | 420.0 kg WR | Blagoy Blagoev; Bulgaria | 417.5 kg | Andrzej Piotrowski; Poland | 382.5 kg |
100 kg
| Snatch | Pavel Kuznetsov; Soviet Union | 182.5 kg | András Hlavati; Hungary | 180.0 kg | Miloš Čiernik; Czechoslovakia | 175.0 kg |
| Clean & Jerk | Pavel Kuznetsov; Soviet Union | 217.5 kg | Miloš Čiernik; Czechoslovakia | 215.0 kg | Ingobert Kind; East Germany | 215.0 kg |
| Total | Pavel Kuznetsov; Soviet Union | 400.0 kg | Miloš Čiernik; Czechoslovakia | 390.0 kg | Ingobert Kind; East Germany | 377.5 kg |
110 kg
| Snatch | Yury Zakharevich; Soviet Union | 190.0 kg | Norberto Oberburger; Italy | 180.0 kg | Ota Zaremba; Czechoslovakia | 177.5 kg |
| Clean & Jerk | Yury Zakharevich; Soviet Union | 225.0 kg | René Wyßuwa; East Germany | 225.0 kg | Norberto Oberburger; Italy | 220.0 kg |
| Total | Yury Zakharevich; Soviet Union | 415.0 kg | Norberto Oberburger; Italy | 400.0 kg | René Wyßuwa; East Germany | 395.0 kg |
+110 kg
| Snatch | Anatoly Pisarenko; Soviet Union | 200.0 kg | Antonio Krastev; Bulgaria | 195.0 kg | Robert Skolimowski; Poland | 192.5 kg |
| Clean & Jerk | Anatoly Pisarenko; Soviet Union | 250.0 kg | Antonio Krastev; Bulgaria | 250.0 kg | Senno Salzwedel; East Germany | 237.5 kg |
| Total | Anatoly Pisarenko; Soviet Union | 450.0 kg | Antonio Krastev; Bulgaria | 445.0 kg | Senno Salzwedel; East Germany | 422.5 kg |

== Medal table ==
Ranking by Big (Total result) medals

| Rank | Nation | Gold | Silver | Bronze | Total |
|---|---|---|---|---|---|
| 1 | Bulgaria (BUL) | 6 | 3 | 1 | 10 |
| 2 | Soviet Union (URS) | 4 | 2 | 2 | 8 |
| 3 | East Germany (GDR) | 0 | 1 | 3 | 4 |
| 3 | Poland (POL) | 0 | 1 | 3 | 4 |
| 5 | Czechoslovakia (TCH) | 0 | 1 | 0 | 1 |
| 5 | Finland (FIN) | 0 | 1 | 0 | 1 |
| 5 | Italy (ITA) | 0 | 1 | 0 | 1 |
| 8 | Romania (ROU) | 0 | 0 | 1 | 1 |
| Totals (8 entries) | | 10 | 10 | 10 | 30 |
