= 1985 European Weightlifting Championships =

64th event edition held in Katowice, Poland

1985 European Championships

The 1985 European Weightlifting Championships were held in Katowice, Poland from May 21 to May 26, 1985. This was the 64th edition of the event. There were 120 men in action from 22 nations.

== Medal summary ==
Event	Gold		Silver		Bronze	
52 kg
Snatch	Sevdalin Marinov; Bulgaria	110.0 kg	Teodor Jakob; Romania	105.0 kg	Istvan Barbaczi; Hungary	100.0 kg
Clean & Jerk	Sevdalin Marinov; Bulgaria	140.0 kg	Bernard Piekorz; Poland	130.0 kg	Istvan Barbaczi; Hungary	127.5 kg
Total	Sevdalin Marinov; Bulgaria	250.0 kg	Istvan Barbaczi; Hungary	227.5 kg	Teodor Jakob; Romania	225.0 kg
56 kg
Snatch	Frank Mavius; East Germany	122.5 kg	Neno Terziyski; Bulgaria	120.0 kg	Oksen Mirzoyan; Soviet Union	117.5 kg
Clean & Jerk	Neno Terziyski; Bulgaria	160.0 kg	Oksen Mirzoyan; Soviet Union	152.5 kg	Frank Mavius; East Germany	147.5 kg
Total	Neno Terziyski; Bulgaria	280.0 kg	Oksen Mirzoyan; Soviet Union	270.0 kg	Frank Mavius; East Germany	270.0 kg
60 kg
Snatch	Naum Shalamanov; Bulgaria	140.0 kg	Yurik Sarkisyan; Soviet Union	130.0 kg	Constantin Chiru; Romania	120.0 kg
Clean & Jerk	Naum Shalamanov; Bulgaria	172.5 kg	Yurik Sarkisyan; Soviet Union	167.5 kg	Andreas Letz; East Germany	167.5 kg
Total	Naum Shalamanov; Bulgaria	312.5 kg	Yurik Sarkisyan; Soviet Union	297.5 kg	Andreas Letz; East Germany	287.5 kg
67.5 kg
Snatch	Marek Seweryn; Poland	150.0 kg	Andreas Behm; East Germany	150.0 kg	Veselin Galabarov; Bulgaria	147.5 kg
Clean & Jerk	Mikhail Petrov; Bulgaria	195.0 kg	Andreas Behm; East Germany	195.0 kg	Hermann Kubenka; East Germany	182.5 kg
Total	Andreas Behm; East Germany	345.0 kg	Mikhail Petrov; Bulgaria	342.5 kg	Marek Seweryn; Poland	330.0 kg
75 kg
Snatch	Aleksandar Varbanov; Bulgaria	157.5 kg	Joachim Kunz; East Germany	155.0 kg	Sergey Li; Soviet Union	155.0 kg
Clean & Jerk	Aleksandar Varbanov; Bulgaria	202.5 kg	Joachim Kunz; East Germany	195.0 kg	Sergey Li; Soviet Union	190.0 kg
Total	Aleksandar Varbanov; Bulgaria	360.0 kg	Joachim Kunz; East Germany	350.0 kg	Sergey Li; Soviet Union	345.0 kg
82.5 kg
Snatch	Asen Zlatev; Bulgaria	177.5 kg	Anatoly Khrapaty; Soviet Union	170.0 kg	Laszlo Kiraly; Hungary	170.0 kg
Clean & Jerk	Asen Zlatev; Bulgaria	215.0 kg	Zdravko Stoichkov; Bulgaria	215.0 kg	Anatoly Khrapaty; Soviet Union	210.0 kg
Total	Asen Zlatev; Bulgaria	392.5 kg	Zdravko Stoichkov; Bulgaria	382.5 kg	Anatoly Khrapaty; Soviet Union	380.0 kg
90 kg
Snatch	Viktor Solodov; Soviet Union	180.0 kg	Rumen Teodosiev; Bulgaria	177.5 kg	Andrzej Piotrowski; Poland	175.0 kg
Clean & Jerk	Rumen Teodosiev; Bulgaria	222.5 kg	Viktor Solodov; Soviet Union	222.5 kg	Piotr Krukowski; Poland	215.0 kg
Total	Viktor Solodov; Soviet Union	402.5 kg	Rumen Teodosiev; Bulgaria	400.0 kg	Piotr Krukowski; Poland	390.0 kg
100 kg
Snatch	Nicu Vlad; Romania	185.0 kg	Viktor Shevchik; Soviet Union	185.0 kg	Andor Szanyi; Hungary	172.5 kg
Clean & Jerk	Andor Szanyi; Hungary	217.5 kg	Nicu Vlad; Romania	215.0 kg	René Wyßuwa; East Germany	215.0 kg
Total	Nicu Vlad; Romania	400.0 kg	Viktor Shevchik; Soviet Union	392.5 kg	Andor Szanyi; Hungary	390.0 kg
110 kg
Snatch	Yury Zakharevich; Soviet Union	185.0 kg	Anton Baraniak; Czechoslovakia	180.0 kg	Milos Ciernik; Czechoslovakia	177.5 kg
Clean & Jerk	Yury Zakharevich; Soviet Union	222.5 kg	Anton Baraniak; Czechoslovakia	222.5 kg	Milos Ciernik; Czechoslovakia	217.5 kg
Total	Yury Zakharevich; Soviet Union	407.5 kg	Anton Baraniak; Czechoslovakia	402.5 kg	Milos Ciernik; Czechoslovakia	395.0 kg
+110 kg
Snatch	Aleksandr Gunyashev; Soviet Union	192.5 kg	Robert Skolimowski; Poland	190.0 kg	Senno Salzwedel; East Germany	187.5 kg
Clean & Jerk	Leonid Taranenko; Soviet Union	230.0 kg	Senno Salzwedel; East Germany	227.5 kg	Aleksandr Gunyashev; Soviet Union	225.0 kg
Total	Aleksandr Gunyashev; Soviet Union	417.5 kg	Leonid Taranenko; Soviet Union	415.0 kg	Senno Salzwedel; East Germany	415.0 kg

== Medal table ==
Ranking by Big (Total result) medals

Rank	Nation	Gold	Silver	Bronze	Total
1	Bulgaria (BUL)	5	3	0	8
2	Soviet Union (URS)	3	4	2	9
3	East Germany (GDR)	1	1	3	5
4	Romania (ROU)	1	0	1	2
5	Czechoslovakia (TCH)	0	1	1	2
5	Hungary (HUN)	0	1	1	2
7	Poland (POL)	0	0	2	2
Totals (7 entries)		10	10	10	30
