= 1987 World Weightlifting Championships =

International weightlifting competition

1987 World Championships
- Host city: Various cities across countries
- Dates: Unknown

The following is the final results of the 1987 World Weightlifting Championships. The men's competition was held in Ostrava, Czechoslovakia and the women's competition was held in Daytona Beach, Florida, United States. The women's competition was the first women's world championship in weightlifting.

== Medal summary ==
=== Men ===
Event	Gold		Silver		Bronze	
52 kg
Snatch	Sevdalin Marinov; Bulgaria	115.0 kg	He Zhuoqiang; China	112.5 kg	Jacek Gutowski; Poland	112.5 kg
Clean & Jerk	He Zhuoqiang; China	147.5 kg	Sevdalin Marinov; Bulgaria	147.5 kg	Chun Byung-kwan; South Korea	135.0 kg
Total	Sevdalin Marinov; Bulgaria	262.5 kg	He Zhuoqiang; China	260.0 kg	Jacek Gutowski; Poland	247.5 kg
56 kg
Snatch	Liu Shoubin; China	130.0 kg	Neno Terziyski; Bulgaria	125.0 kg	Ri Jae-son; North Korea	120.0 kg
Clean & Jerk	Neno Terziyski; Bulgaria	162.5 kg	He Yingqiang; China	160.0 kg	Liu Shoubin; China	145.0 kg
Total	Neno Terziyski; Bulgaria	287.5 kg	Liu Shoubin; China	275.0 kg	Ri Jae-son; North Korea	265.0 kg
60 kg
Snatch	Stefan Topurov; Bulgaria	140.0 kg	Yurik Sarkisyan; Soviet Union	137.5 kg	Oksen Mirzoyan; Soviet Union	135.0 kg
Clean & Jerk	Stefan Topurov; Bulgaria	175.0 kg	Oksen Mirzoyan; Soviet Union	170.0 kg	Yurik Sarkisyan; Soviet Union	170.0 kg
Total	Stefan Topurov; Bulgaria	315.0 kg	Yurik Sarkisyan; Soviet Union	307.5 kg	Oksen Mirzoyan; Soviet Union	305.0 kg
67.5 kg
Snatch	Mikhail Petrov; Bulgaria	155.0 kg	Andreas Behm; East Germany	150.0 kg	Israel Militosyan; Soviet Union	150.0 kg
Clean & Jerk	Mikhail Petrov; Bulgaria	195.0 kg	Andreas Behm; East Germany	190.0 kg	Israel Militosyan; Soviet Union	185.0 kg
Total	Mikhail Petrov; Bulgaria	350.0 kg	Andreas Behm; East Germany	340.0 kg	Israel Militosyan; Soviet Union	335.0 kg
75 kg
Snatch	Borislav Gidikov; Bulgaria	167.5 kg	Cai Yanshu; China	162.5 kg	Aleksandar Varbanov; Bulgaria	160.0 kg
Clean & Jerk	Borislav Gidikov; Bulgaria	207.5 kg	Aleksandar Varbanov; Bulgaria	205.0 kg	Andrei Socaci; Romania	200.0 kg
Total	Borislav Gidikov; Bulgaria	375.0 kg	Aleksandar Varbanov; Bulgaria	365.0 kg	Ingo Steinhöfel; East Germany	345.0 kg
82.5 kg
Snatch	László Barsi; Hungary	180.0 kg	Sergey Li; Soviet Union	172.5 kg	Asen Zlatev; Bulgaria	170.0 kg
Clean & Jerk	Sergey Li; Soviet Union	210.0 kg	László Barsi; Hungary	210.0 kg	Constantin Urdaș; Romania	205.0 kg
Total	László Barsi; Hungary	390.0 kg	Sergey Li; Soviet Union	382.5 kg	Asen Zlatev; Bulgaria	375.0 kg
90 kg
Snatch	Ivan Chakarov; Bulgaria	187.5 kg	Anatoly Khrapaty; Soviet Union	185.0 kg	Sławomir Zawada; Poland	180.0 kg
Clean & Jerk	Anatoly Khrapaty; Soviet Union	232.5 kg	Ivan Chakarov; Bulgaria	225.0 kg	Sergey Chernenko; Soviet Union	220.0 kg
Total	Anatoly Khrapaty; Soviet Union	417.5 kg	Ivan Chakarov; Bulgaria	412.5 kg	Sławomir Zawada; Poland	395.0 kg
100 kg
Snatch	Nicu Vlad; Romania	192.5 kg	Pavel Kuznetsov; Soviet Union	192.5 kg	Andor Szanyi; Hungary	185.0 kg
Clean & Jerk	Pavel Kuznetsov; Soviet Union	230.0 kg	Nicu Vlad; Romania	227.5 kg	Ronny Weller; East Germany	225.0 kg
Total	Pavel Kuznetsov; Soviet Union	422.5 kg	Nicu Vlad; Romania	420.0 kg	Andor Szanyi; Hungary	407.5 kg
110 kg
Snatch	Yury Zakharevich; Soviet Union	203.0 kg WR	József Jacsó; Hungary	190.0 kg	Anton Baraniak; Czechoslovakia	185.0 kg
Clean & Jerk	Yury Zakharevich; Soviet Union	242.5 kg	Detelin Petrov; Bulgaria	230.0 kg	Anton Baraniak; Czechoslovakia	230.0 kg
Total	Yury Zakharevich; Soviet Union	445.0 kg	József Jacsó; Hungary	415.0 kg	Anton Baraniak; Czechoslovakia	415.0 kg
+110 kg
Snatch	Antonio Krastev; Bulgaria	216.0 kg WR	Aleksandr Kurlovich; Soviet Union	212.5 kg	Leonid Taranenko; Soviet Union	202.5 kg
Clean & Jerk	Leonid Taranenko; Soviet Union	265.5 kg WR	Aleksandr Kurlovich; Soviet Union	260.0 kg	Manfred Nerlinger; West Germany	255.0 kg
Total	Aleksandr Kurlovich; Soviet Union	472.5 kg WR	Leonid Taranenko; Soviet Union	467.5 kg	Antonio Krastev; Bulgaria	460.0 kg

=== Women ===
Event	Gold		Silver		Bronze	
44 kg
Snatch	Cai Jun; China	70.0 kg	Chen Aizhen; China	62.5 kg	Sibby Harris; United States	50.0 kg
Clean & Jerk	Chen Aizhen; China	75.0 kg	Cai Jun; China	75.0 kg	Sibby Harris; United States	65.0 kg
Total	Cai Jun; China	145.0 kg	Chen Aizhen; China	137.5 kg	Sibby Harris; United States	115.0 kg
48 kg
Snatch	Huang Xiaoyu; China	75.0 kg	Robin Byrd; United States	62.5 kg	Sandra Gómez; Spain	52.5 kg
Clean & Jerk	Huang Xiaoyu; China	95.0 kg	Robin Byrd; United States	75.0 kg	Sandra Gómez; Spain	70.0 kg
Total	Huang Xiaoyu; China	170.0 kg	Robin Byrd; United States	137.5 kg	Sandra Gómez; Spain	122.5 kg
52 kg
Snatch	Yan Zhangqun; China	67.5 kg	Margarita Babadzanova; Bulgaria	65.0 kg	Rachel Silverman; United States	55.0 kg
Clean & Jerk	Yan Zhangqun; China	90.0 kg	Margarita Babadzanova; Bulgaria	82.5 kg	Rachel Silverman; United States	77.5 kg
Total	Yan Zhangqun; China	157.5 kg	Margarita Babadzanova; Bulgaria	147.5 kg	Rachel Silverman; United States	132.5 kg
56 kg
Snatch	Cui Aihong; China	75.0 kg	Won Soon-yi; South Korea	65.0 kg	Stéphanie Genna; France	62.5 kg
Clean & Jerk	Cui Aihong; China	85.0 kg	Marie Forteath; Great Britain	80.0 kg	Stéphanie Genna; France	80.0 kg
Total	Cui Aihong; China	160.0 kg	Won Soon-yi; South Korea	145.0 kg	Stéphanie Genna; France	142.5 kg
60 kg
Snatch	Zeng Xinling; China	75.0 kg	Gabriela Dimitrova; Bulgaria	75.0 kg	Ibolya Torma; Hungary	72.5 kg
Clean & Jerk	Zeng Xinling; China	105.0 kg	Ibolya Torma; Hungary	100.0 kg	Gabriela Dimitrova; Bulgaria	92.5 kg
Total	Zeng Xinling; China	180.0 kg	Ibolya Torma; Hungary	172.5 kg	Gabriela Dimitrova; Bulgaria	167.5 kg
67.5 kg
Snatch	Arlys Kovach; United States	80.0 kg	Senka Asenova; Bulgaria	80.0 kg	Gao Lijuan; China	77.5 kg
Clean & Jerk	Gao Lijuan; China	102.5 kg	Jeanette Rose; Great Britain	100.0 kg	Arlys Kovach; United States	100.0 kg
Total	Gao Lijuan; China	180.0 kg	Arlys Kovach; United States	180.0 kg	Senka Asenova; Bulgaria	180.0 kg
75 kg
Snatch	Tanya Dimitrova; Bulgaria	92.5 kg	Li Hongling; China	90.0 kg	Mária Takács; Hungary	87.5 kg
Clean & Jerk	Li Hongling; China	120.0 kg	Mária Takács; Hungary	117.5 kg	Tanya Dimitrova; Bulgaria	102.5 kg
Total	Li Hongling; China	210.0 kg	Mária Takács; Hungary	205.0 kg	Tanya Dimitrova; Bulgaria	195.0 kg
82.5 kg
Snatch	Karyn Marshall; United States	95.0 kg	Erika Takács; Hungary	90.0 kg	Milena Mileskova; Bulgaria	90.0 kg
Clean & Jerk	Karyn Marshall; United States	125.0 kg	Erika Takács; Hungary	117.5 kg	Judy Oakes; Great Britain	112.5 kg
Total	Karyn Marshall; United States	220.0 kg	Erika Takács; Hungary	207.5 kg	Milena Mileskova; Bulgaria	202.5 kg
+82.5 kg
Snatch	Han Changmei; China	90.0 kg	Becky Levi; United States	87.5 kg	Snejana Vasileva; Bulgaria	85.0 kg
Clean & Jerk	Han Changmei; China	120.0 kg	Becky Levi; United States	110.0 kg	Snejana Vasileva; Bulgaria	100.0 kg
Total	Han Changmei; China	210.0 kg	Becky Levi; United States	197.5 kg	Snejana Vasileva; Bulgaria	185.0 kg

== Medal table ==
Ranking by Big (Total result) medals

Rank	Nation	Gold	Silver	Bronze	Total
1	China	8	3	0	11
2	Bulgaria	5	3	7	15
3	Soviet Union	4	3	2	9
4	Hungary	1	4	1	6
5	United States	1	3	2	6
6	East Germany	0	1	1	2
7	Romania	0	1	0	1
7	South Korea	0	1	0	1
9	Poland	0	0	2	2
10	Czechoslovakia	0	0	1	1
10	France	0	0	1	1
10	North Korea	0	0	1	1
10	Spain	0	0	1	1
Totals (13 entries)		19	19	19	57

Ranking by all medals: Big (Total result) and Small (Snatch and Clean & Jerk)

Rank	Nation	Gold	Silver	Bronze	Total
1	China	24	9	2	35
2	Bulgaria	16	12	14	42
3	Soviet Union	10	10	8	28
4	United States	4	7	7	18
5	Hungary	2	10	4	16
6	Romania	1	2	2	5
7	East Germany	0	3	2	5
8	Great Britain	0	2	1	3
8	South Korea	0	2	1	3
10	Poland	0	0	4	4
11	Czechoslovakia	0	0	3	3
11	France	0	0	3	3
11	Spain	0	0	3	3
14	North Korea	0	0	2	2
15	West Germany	0	0	1	1
Totals (15 entries)		57	57	57	171
