= Weightlifting at the 1988 Summer Olympics – Men's 110 kg =

Weightlifting at the Olympics

Men's 110 kg at the Games of the XXIV Olympiad
- Venue: Olympic Weightlifting Gymnasium
- Date: 27 September 1988
- Competitors: 20 from 15 nations
- Winning total: 455.0 kg WR

Medalists
1st place, gold medalist(s)		Yury Zakharevich	Soviet Union
2nd place, silver medalist(s)		József Jacsó	Hungary
3rd place, bronze medalist(s)		Ronny Weller	East Germany

The men's 110 kg weightlifting competitions at the 1988 Summer Olympics in Seoul took place on 27 September at the Olympic Weightlifting Gymnasium. It was the sixteenth appearance of the heavyweight II class.

== Results ==
Rank	Name	Country	kg
1	Yury Zakharevich	Soviet Union	455.0
2	József Jacsó	Hungary	427.5
3	Ronny Weller	East Germany	425.0
4	Michael Schubert	East Germany	425.0
5	Aleksandr Popov	Soviet Union	420.0
6	Norberto Oberburger	Italy	415.0
7	Stanisław Małysa	Poland	395.0
8	Frank Seipelt	West Germany	387.5
9	Rickard Nilsson	Sweden	375.0
10	Frank Juul Strømbo	Denmark	367.5
11	Rich Schutz	United States	360.0
12	Mark Thomas	Great Britain	360.0
13	Jeff Michels	United States	360.0
14	Omar Yousfi	Algeria	310.0
15	Pius Ochieng	Kenya	295.0
16	Tauama Timoti	American Samoa	260.0
17	Milan Cukovic	Guam	220.0
AC	Eduard Ohlinger	West Germany	175.0
AC	Anton Baraniak	Czechoslovakia	175.0
AC	Andrew Davies	Great Britain	DNF
