= 1985 World Weightlifting Championships =

International weightlifting competition

- Host city: Södertälje, Sweden
- Dates: 23 August - 1 September 1985

The 1985 Men's World Weightlifting Championships were held in Södertälje, Sweden from August 23 to September 1, 1985. There were 195 men in action from 38 nations.

== Medal summary ==
Event	Gold		Silver		Bronze	
52 kg
Snatch	Sevdalin Marinov; Bulgaria	112.5 kg	Lyu Jun-sik; North Korea	110.0 kg	Tadeusz Golik; Poland	110.0 kg
Clean & Jerk	Sevdalin Marinov; Bulgaria	140.0 kg	Zeng Guoqiang; China	135.0 kg	Wang Huanbing; China	135.0 kg
Total	Sevdalin Marinov; Bulgaria	252.5 kg	Zeng Guoqiang; China	242.5 kg	Bernard Piekorz; Poland	237.5 kg
56 kg
Snatch	Neno Terziyski; Bulgaria	122.5 kg	Oksen Mirzoyan; Soviet Union	122.5 kg	He Yingqiang; China	120.0 kg
Clean & Jerk	Neno Terziyski; Bulgaria	157.5 kg	Oksen Mirzoyan; Soviet Union	157.5 kg	He Yingqiang; China	150.0 kg
Total	Neno Terziyski; Bulgaria	280.0 kg	Oksen Mirzoyan; Soviet Union	280.0 kg	He Yingqiang; China	270.0 kg
60 kg
Snatch	Naum Shalamanov; Bulgaria	143.0 kg WR	Yurik Sarkisyan; Soviet Union	137.5 kg	Andreas Letz; East Germany	127.5 kg
Clean & Jerk	Naum Shalamanov; Bulgaria	180.0 kg	Yurik Sarkisyan; Soviet Union	170.0 kg	Andreas Letz; East Germany	165.0 kg
Total	Naum Shalamanov; Bulgaria	322.5 kg	Yurik Sarkisyan; Soviet Union	307.5 kg	Andreas Letz; East Germany	292.5 kg
67.5 kg
Snatch	Veselin Galabarov; Bulgaria	150.0 kg	Mikhail Petrov; Bulgaria	145.0 kg	Shared silver	
Snatch	Veselin Galabarov; Bulgaria	150.0 kg	Jouni Grönman; Finland	145.0 kg	Shared silver	
Clean & Jerk	Mikhail Petrov; Bulgaria	190.0 kg	Veselin Galabarov; Bulgaria	180.0 kg	Yao Jingyuan; China	175.0 kg
Total	Mikhail Petrov; Bulgaria	335.0 kg	Veselin Galabarov; Bulgaria	330.0 kg	Yao Jingyuan; China	315.0 kg
75 kg
Snatch	Andrei Socaci; Romania	160.0 kg	Aleksandar Varbanov; Bulgaria	160.0 kg	Mincho Pashov; Bulgaria	160.0 kg
Clean & Jerk	Aleksandar Varbanov; Bulgaria	211.5 kg WR	Mincho Pashov; Bulgaria	197.5 kg	Andrei Socaci; Romania	195.0 kg
Total	Aleksandar Varbanov; Bulgaria	370.0 kg	Mincho Pashov; Bulgaria	357.5 kg	Andrei Socaci; Romania	355.0 kg
82.5 kg
Snatch	Yurik Vardanyan; Soviet Union	177.5 kg	Asen Zlatev; Bulgaria	177.5 kg	László Király; Hungary	170.0 kg
Clean & Jerk	Yurik Vardanyan; Soviet Union	220.0 kg	Asen Zlatev; Bulgaria	215.0 kg	László Király; Hungary	205.0 kg
Total	Yurik Vardanyan; Soviet Union	397.5 kg	Asen Zlatev; Bulgaria	392.5 kg	László Király; Hungary	375.0 kg
90 kg
Snatch	Zoltán Balázsfi; Hungary	177.5 kg	Shared gold		Shared gold	
Snatch	Anatoly Khrapaty; Soviet Union	177.5 kg	Shared gold		Shared gold	
Snatch	Viktor Solodov; Soviet Union	177.5 kg	Shared gold		Shared gold	
Clean & Jerk	Anatoly Khrapaty; Soviet Union	217.5 kg	Shared gold		Piotr Krukowski; Poland	207.5 kg
Clean & Jerk	Viktor Solodov; Soviet Union	217.5 kg	Shared gold		Piotr Krukowski; Poland	207.5 kg
Total	Anatoly Khrapaty; Soviet Union	395.0 kg	Shared gold		Piotr Krukowski; Poland	385.0 kg
Total	Viktor Solodov; Soviet Union	395.0 kg	Shared gold		Piotr Krukowski; Poland	385.0 kg
100 kg
Snatch	Andor Szanyi; Hungary	185.0 kg	Nicu Vlad; Romania	185.0 kg	Pavel Kuznetsov; Soviet Union	185.0 kg
Clean & Jerk	Andor Szanyi; Hungary	230.0 kg	René Wyßuwa; East Germany	225.0 kg	Pavel Kuznetsov; Soviet Union	222.5 kg
Total	Andor Szanyi; Hungary	415.0 kg	Pavel Kuznetsov; Soviet Union	407.5 kg	Nicu Vlad; Romania	405.0 kg
110 kg
Snatch	Yury Zakharevich; Soviet Union	190.0 kg	Norberto Oberburger; Italy	180.0 kg	Miloš Čiernik; Czechoslovakia	175.0 kg
Clean & Jerk	Yury Zakharevich; Soviet Union	232.5 kg	Miloš Čiernik; Czechoslovakia	222.5 kg	Norberto Oberburger; Italy	217.5 kg
Total	Yury Zakharevich; Soviet Union	422.5 kg	Miloš Čiernik; Czechoslovakia	397.5 kg	Norberto Oberburger; Italy	397.5 kg
+110 kg
Snatch	Antonio Krastev; Bulgaria	202.5 kg	Aleksandr Gunyashev; Soviet Union	195.0 kg	Leonid Taranenko; Soviet Union	185.0 kg
Clean & Jerk	Senno Salzwedel; East Germany	237.5 kg	Aleksandr Gunyashev; Soviet Union	237.5 kg	Manfred Nerlinger; West Germany	237.5 kg
Total	Antonio Krastev; Bulgaria	437.5 kg	Aleksandr Gunyashev; Soviet Union	432.5 kg	Manfred Nerlinger; West Germany	422.5 kg

== Medal table ==
Ranking by Big (Total result) medals

Rank	Nation	Gold	Silver	Bronze	Total
1	Bulgaria	6	3	0	9
2	Soviet Union	4	4	0	8
3	Hungary	1	0	1	2
4	China	0	1	2	3
5	Czechoslovakia	0	1	0	1
6	Poland	0	0	2	2
6	Romania	0	0	2	2
8	East Germany	0	0	1	1
8	Italy	0	0	1	1
8	West Germany	0	0	1	1
Totals (10 entries)		11	9	10	30

Ranking by all medals: Big (Total result) and Small (Snatch and Clean & Jerk)

Rank	Nation	Gold	Silver	Bronze	Total
1	Bulgaria	16	9	1	26
2	Soviet Union	12	10	3	25
3	Hungary	4	0	3	7
4	East Germany	1	1	3	5
4	Romania	1	1	3	5
6	China	0	2	6	8
7	Czechoslovakia	0	2	1	3
8	Italy	0	1	2	3
9	Finland	0	1	0	1
9	North Korea	0	1	0	1
11	Poland	0	0	4	4
12	West Germany	0	0	2	2
Totals (12 entries)		34	28	28	90
