= Geghakert =

Geghakert Գեղակերտ
- Location within Armenia
- Coordinates: 40°11′07″N 44°14′32″E
- Country: Armenia
- Province: Armavir

Area
  - Total: 6.58 km^{2} (2.54 sq mi)
- Elevation: 885 m (2,904 ft)

Population (2011)
  - Total: 2,564
  - Density: 390/km^{2} (1,010/sq mi)
- Time zone: UTC+4 ( )
  - Summer (DST): UTC+5 ( )

Geghakert (Armenian: Գեղակերտ; also referred to as Samaghar), is a village in the Armavir Province of Armenia. The village has a 13th-century church known as Surb Harutyun (Holy Resurrection)., as well as a memorial fountain dedicated to those who died in World War II. There is also a school (407 students), first aid station, house of culture, community center, and a kindergarten.

== Surb Harutyun Church ==
S. Harutyun Church is constructed of mudbrick and has red brick detailing around its windows and doors. There are two entrances to the interior, one from the south, and one from the west. Also of interest, is the turquoise painted brick archways around the portals. The church's altar is designed to resemble the façade of a church. Resting in a niche at the altar, is a gilded painting of the Virgin Mary holding a baby Jesus.

== Notable people ==
- Yurik Sarkisyan, Olympic silver medalist, world and European champion in wrestling

== Gallery ==
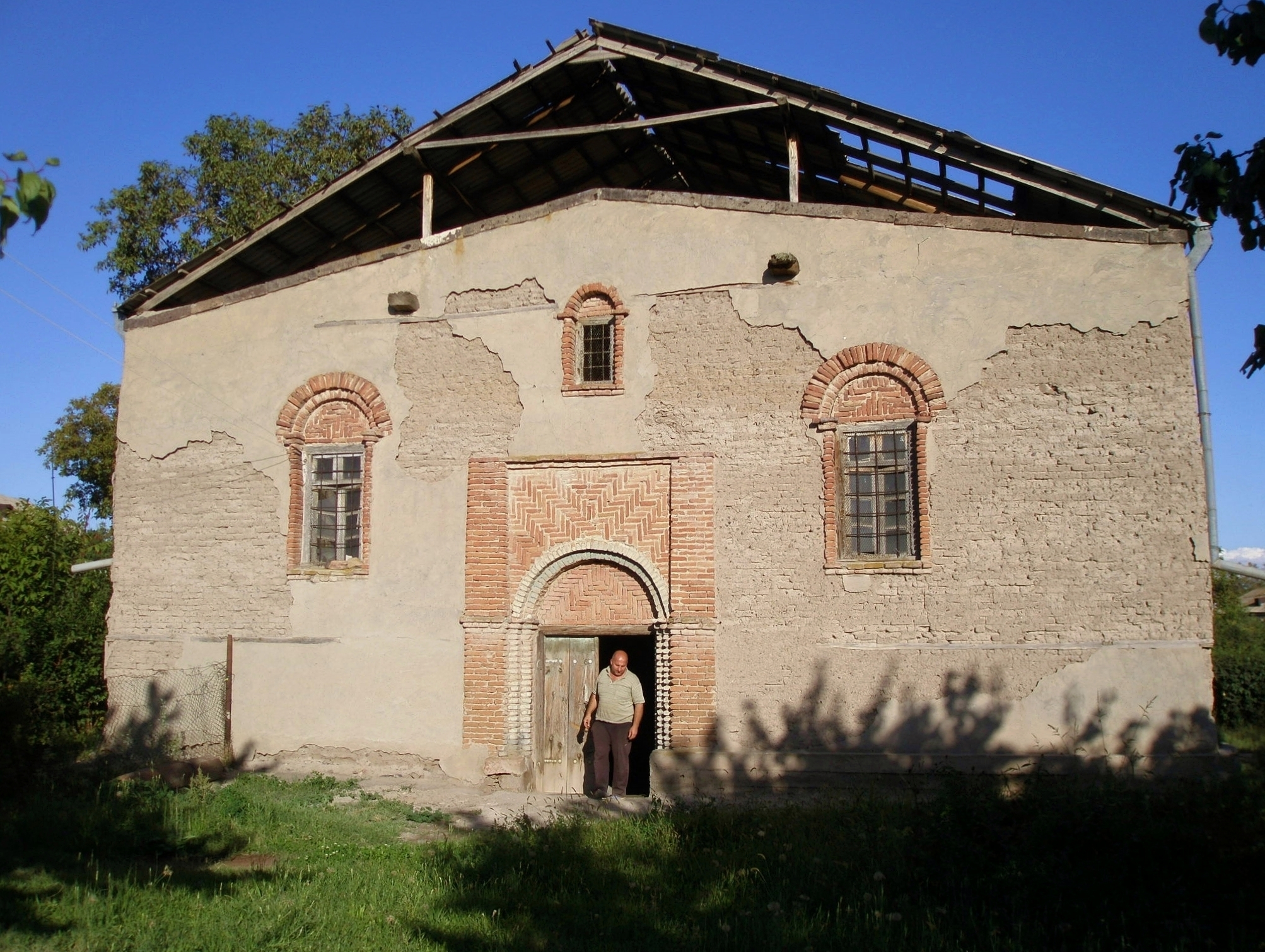
West façade and entrance of S. Harutyun Church (13th century)

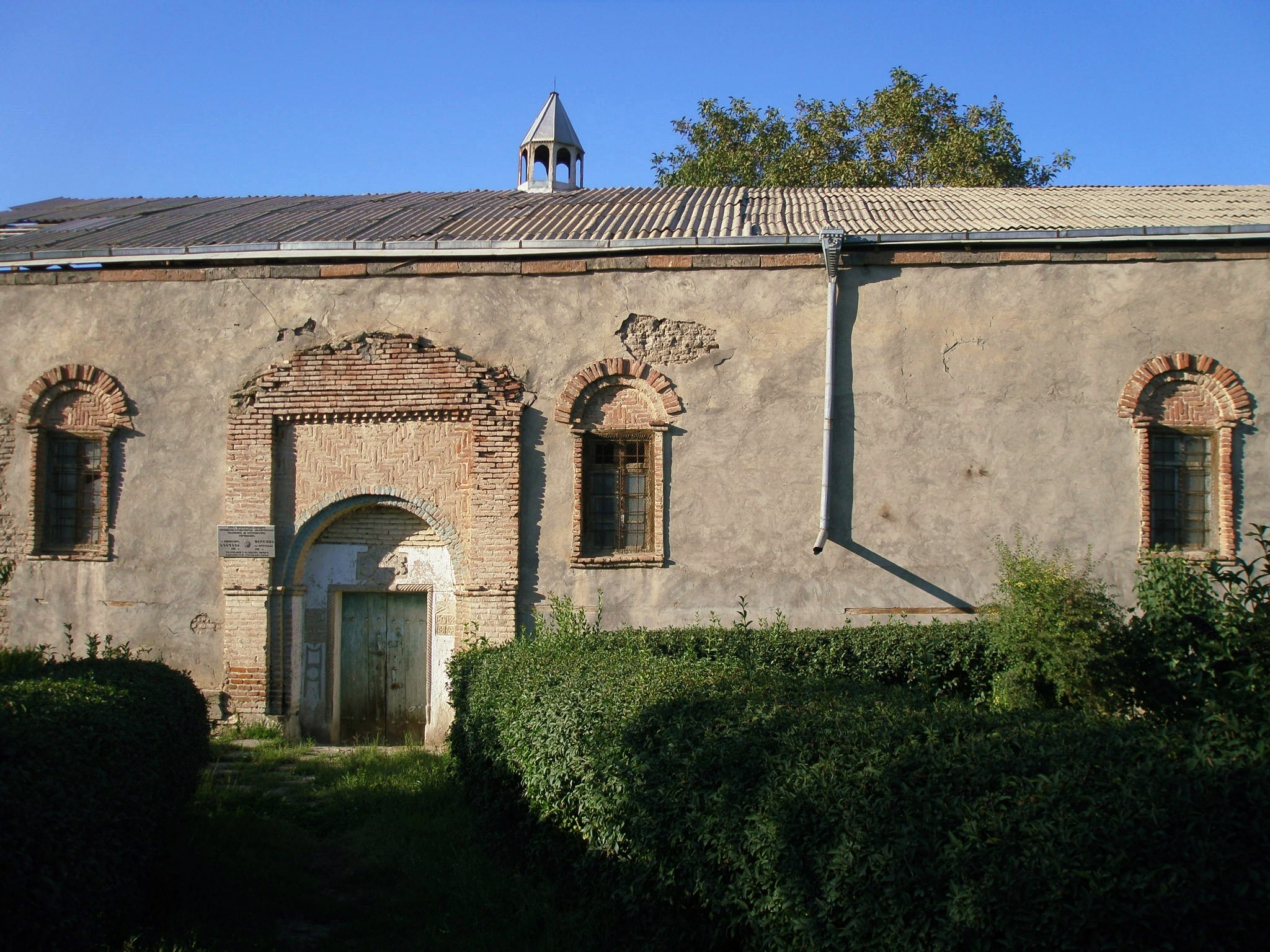
South façade and entrance of S. Harutyun Church (13th century)

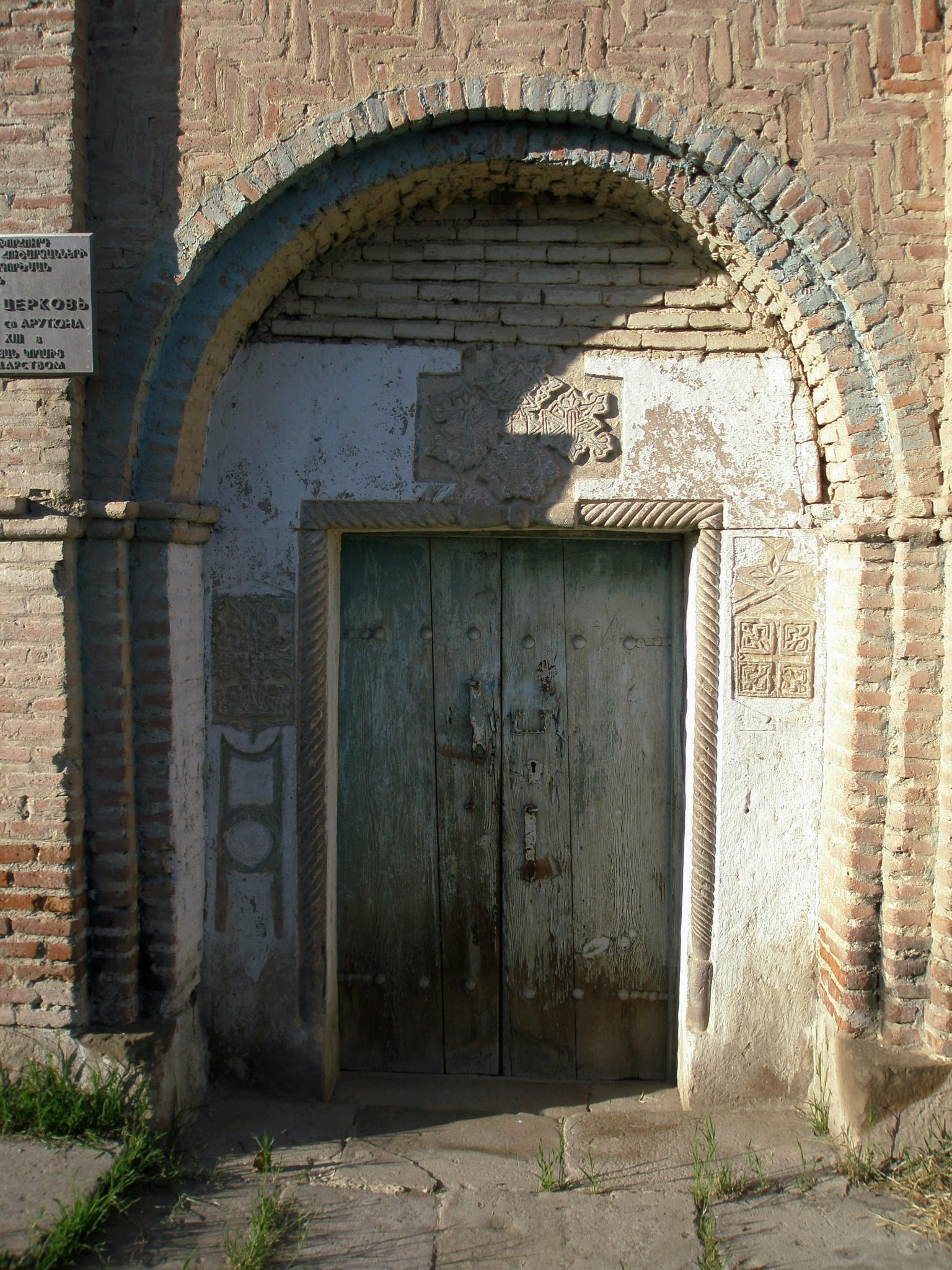
South entrance

== See also ==
- Armavir Province
