= Eduard Ohlinger =

German weightlifter

Personal information
- Nationality: German
- Born: 20 May 1967; Haßloch, Germany
- Died: 12 December 2004 (aged 37); Haßloch, Germany

Sport
- Sport: Weightlifting

Eduard Ohlinger (20 May 1967 – 12 December 2004) was a German weightlifter. He competed in the men's heavyweight II event at the 1988 Summer Olympics.
