= Yurik Vardanyan =

Soviet weightlifter

Yuri Vardanyan
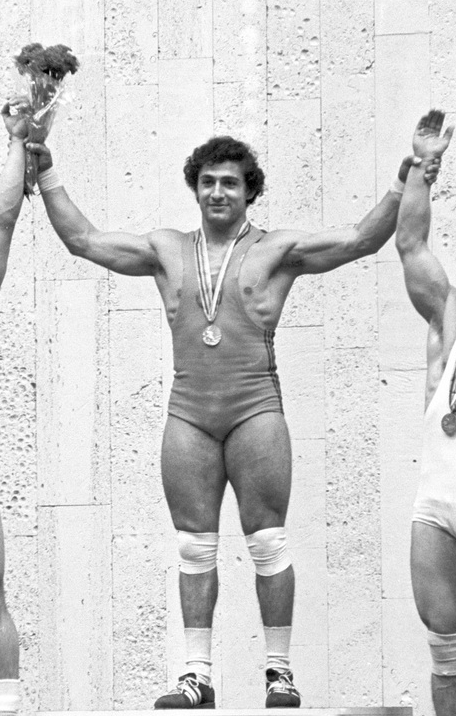
- Vardanyan at the 1980 Summer Olympics in Moscow

Personal information
- Nationality: Armenian
- Born: 13 June 1956 Leninakan, Soviet Union (now Gyumri, Armenia)
- Died: 1 November 2018 (aged 62) United States

Sport
- Country: Soviet Union
- Sport: Olympic weightlifting
- Turned pro: 1977
- Retired: 1985
Medal record
Olympic Games
Gold medal – first place	1980 Moscow	-82.5 kg
World Championships
Gold medal – first place	1977 Stuttgart	-75 kg
Gold medal – first place	1978 Gettysburg	-82.5 kg
Gold medal – first place	1979 Thessaloniki	-82.5 kg
Gold medal – first place	1980 Moscow	-82.5 kg
Gold medal – first place	1981 Lille	-82.5 kg
Silver medal – second place	1982 Ljubljana	-90 kg
Gold medal – first place	1983 Moscow	-82.5 kg
Gold medal – first place	1985 Södertälje	-82.5 kg
European Championships
Gold medal – first place	1977 Stuttgart	-75 kg
Gold medal – first place	1978 Havířov	-82.5 kg
Gold medal – first place	1980 Belgrade	-82.5 kg
Gold medal – first place	1981 Lille	-82.5 kg
Silver medal – second place	1982 Liubliana	-90 kg
Gold medal – first place	1983 Moscow	-82.5 kg
Silver medal – second place	1984 Vitoria	-82.5 kg
USSR Weightlifting Championships
Gold medal – first place	1977 Ratov Na Donu	-75 kg
Gold medal – first place	1979 Leningrad	-82.5 kg
Gold medal – first place	1981 Novosibirsk	-90 kg
Gold medal – first place	1982 Dnipropetrovsk	-90 kg
Summer Spartakiad of the USSR
Gold medal – first place	1979 Leningrad	-82.5 kg
Cups of the USSR
Gold medal – first place	1976 Sverdlovski	-75 kg Snatch
Gold medal – first place	1976 Sverdlovski	-75 kg Clean and Jerk
Gold medal – first place	1976 Sverdlovski	-75 kg Total
- Updated on 15 December 2012

Yuri (Yurik) Norayrovich Vardanyan (Russian: Юрий (Юрик) Норайрович Варданян; Armenian: Յուրի (Յուրիկ) Վարդանյան, also transliterated Yuri (Yurik) Vardanian, 13 June 1956 – 1 November 2018) was a Soviet Armenian weightlifter. Vardanyan won a gold medal at the 1980 Summer Olympics, becoming the world's first weightlifter to achieve a 400 kilogram total in the 82.5 kg weight category. During his career he set 41 world records. He trained at Lokomotiv in Leninakan, Armenia. He earned the title Honoured Master of Sports of the USSR in 1977 and was awarded the Order of Lenin in 1985. In 1994 he was elected a member of the International Weightlifting Federation Hall of Fame.

In 2009 Vardanyan became an advisor to President Serzh Sargsyan's and was appointed Minister of Sports in May 2013. In June, he was controversially appointed Armenia's ambassador to Georgia.

== Biography ==
=== Early life ===
Vardanyan was born on 13 June 1956 in Leninakan, Armenian SSR (now Gyumri, Armenia), a city well known for its weightlifters. He began weight training in 1970 under the guidance of his uncle Sergey Vardanyan.

Yuri Vardanyan first came onto the international weightlifting scene in 1977. He competed against Peter Wenzel of East Germany, one of the top middleweights in the world, twice that year and defeated him both times. Also that same year Vardanyan also won the Championship of the USSR for the first time. Vardanyan had set all the world records in the division by the time of the Weightlifting European Championships at the age of 20 and became a Weightlifting World Champion for the first time at the age of 21. For his deeds, he received the Honoured Master of Sports of the USSR award that year.

In 1978, Vardanyan moved up to the light heavyweight division (82.5 kg). He soon became the European Champion again and set all the division records by the time of the Championships. Four months later, at the World Championships, Vardanyan came into the competition relatively overshadowed by more well-known weightlifters, such as David Rigert. Vardanyan caught the eyes of the weightlifting world by breaking all of his own records again and defeating silver medalist Péter Baczakó of Hungary by 25 kg in the total in a dominant performance.

Vardanyan's spot as the best light heavyweight in the world had gone unchallenged once again in 1979. He set many world records at the USSR competitions that year, leaving the world record in the total at 390 kg. Because of his success so far, great expectations were set for Vardanyan at the Olympics the coming year.

=== 1980 Olympic Games ===
At the 1980 Summer Olympics Vardanyan became the first weightlifter from Armenia ever to win a gold medal in weightlifting.

In a dominant performance, Vardanyan also became the first light-heavyweight (82.5 kg) to lift a total of 400 kg in an official competition, shattering both the Olympic and world records. By contrast, middle-heavyweight gold medalist Peter Baczako (90 kg) totaled 377.5 kg and sub-heavyweight gold medalist Ota Zaremba (100 kg) totaled 395 kg. Even heavyweight bronze medalist György Szalai (110 kg) had only totaled 390 kg.

As for Vardanyan's division, silver medalist Blagoy Blagoev had totaled 372.5 kg and bronze medalist Dušan Poliačik totaled 367.5 kg.

The following year, Vardanyan moved up to middle-heavyweight for a competition in Donetsk, in which he set all the division's world records, but decided to move back down to light heavyweight for the World and European Championships in Lille. It was also during this time that Asen Zlatev of Bulgaria emerged as a top contender in the division. Zlatev had also won a gold medal at the 1980 Olympics and now moved up to light heavyweight, as had Vardanyan. Zlatev placed second behind Vardanyan in both competitions in Lille.

Vardanyan went back up to middle-heavyweight again in 1982. He set all the division records again at the USSR Weightlifting Championships in Dnipropetrovsk. However, he came in second to old rival Blagoi Blagoev at the European and World Championships and decided to campaign at light heavyweight once again.

Competing as a light heavyweight again, Vardanyan successfully regained his European and World Championships in close competitions to Zlatev, winning by just 2.5 kg in the total in both. At the 1983 World Weightlifting Championships, Vardanyan's friends and teammates Oksen Mirzoyan and Yurik Sarkisyan had also won the gold medal in their respective divisions, meaning that Armenians had come in first in the world in three of the ten divisions.

Vardanyan faced defeat for the only time in the light heavyweight weight class at the 1984 European Weightlifting Championships, coming in second to Zlatev.

=== 1984 Friendship Games ===
Because of the 1984 Summer Olympics boycott, Vardanyan was unable to compete at the Olympics that year, despite being a massive gold medal favorite. In place of the 1984 Olympic Games, Vardanyan and the rest of the Soviet and Soviet-affiliated athletes competed at the 1984 Friendship Games.

Vardanyan gave yet another dominant performance at the Friendship Games, this time totalling 405 kg to win the gold medal, 20 kg ahead of silver medalist Asen Zlatev (385 kg) who also riched 405 at the World Championships in Sofia in 1986. Leading up to the light heavyweight division, all the first five divisions had been won by the Bulgarian team. Vardanyan was the first weightlifter from the Soviet team (or any other country) to win a gold medal. His performance would be followed by the Soviet weightlifters winning gold in the remaining four division, tying the Bulgarians in gold medals and total medals and winning the event due to having more silver medals.

Vardanyan also set all the world records for a final time in the light heavyweight division. Although thirty world records were broken in the weightlifting event, Vardanyan was the only weightlifter to break all three of the snatch, clean and jerk and total world records in his respective division. Vardanyan lifted a total of 405 kg, a total that has not been matched since, as the current light-heavyweight record for the now 85 kg light heavyweight category (thereby not including records set before the weightlimit change) is currently 394 kg, set by Andrei Rybakou at the 2008 Summer Olympics.

=== Late career ===
Following the Friendship Games, Vardanyan won his final World Championship at the 1985 World Weightlifting Championships. Vardanyan won seven gold medals and one silver medal in total in the years he competed at the World Weightlifting Championships, putting him just in second on the all time medal count, behind the great Vasily Alekseyev. Vardanyan received the Order of Lenin award in 1985 for his many accomplishments in the field of sport. Vardanyan set 41 world records during his decorated career.

Vardanyan achieved great popularity in the political world for his accomplishments in sports. He became a member of the Armenian parliament. When the Soviet Union was on the verge of collapse, those who came to power sought to win the support of the best-known people in the country. In a bid to make people respect them and their decisions, the Union leaders paid Vardanyan a number of visits and requested that he express his support in public. He refused. Shortly before that, Vardanyan received an offer to move for the time being to the USA to sign a contract with the Federation of Weightlifting. Vardanyan did so, having little choice otherwise.

Vardanyan was forced to end his weightlifting career prematurely by the Soviet government. He was already training for the 1988 Summer Olympics and had no intention to stop competing. Vardanyan later claimed he could have won four Olympics.

Vardanyan moved to Moorpark, California with his family in 1992. Vardanyan had not forgotten about his homeland and still continued his political pursuit in Moorpark in order to help Armenia. Using connections with former Soviet Union countries, Vardanyan did work in business and traveled frequently.

Vardanyan and his family returned to Armenia in 2009. Vardanyan openly politically supported Serzh Sargsyan's policies, unlike those of the previous President Robert Kocharyan, and decided it was time to return to his homeland in the wake of Sargsyan's election. Vardanyan returned to his political duties and became and became an advisor to the President.

He lived with his family in Yerevan, coaching his son, who has followed in his footsteps and taken up weightlifting.

== Personal life ==
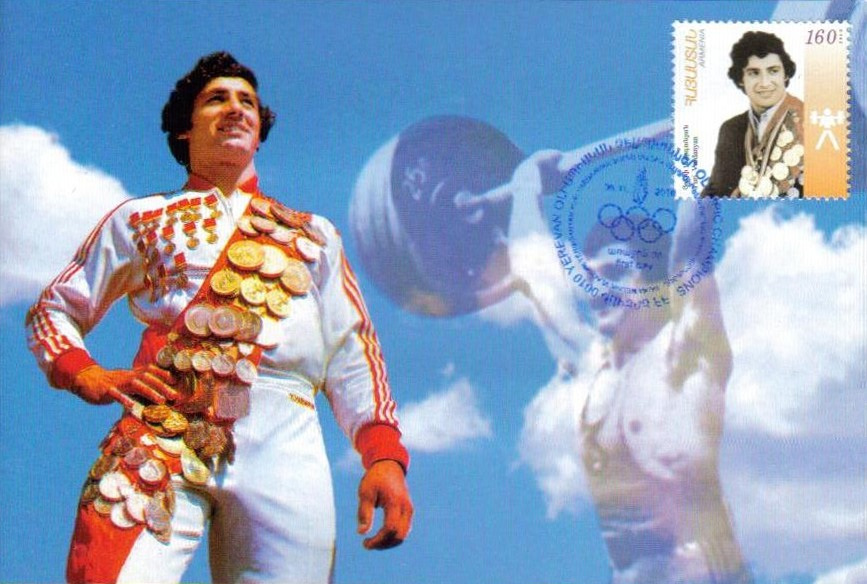
Vardanyan on a 2010 Armenian postal card

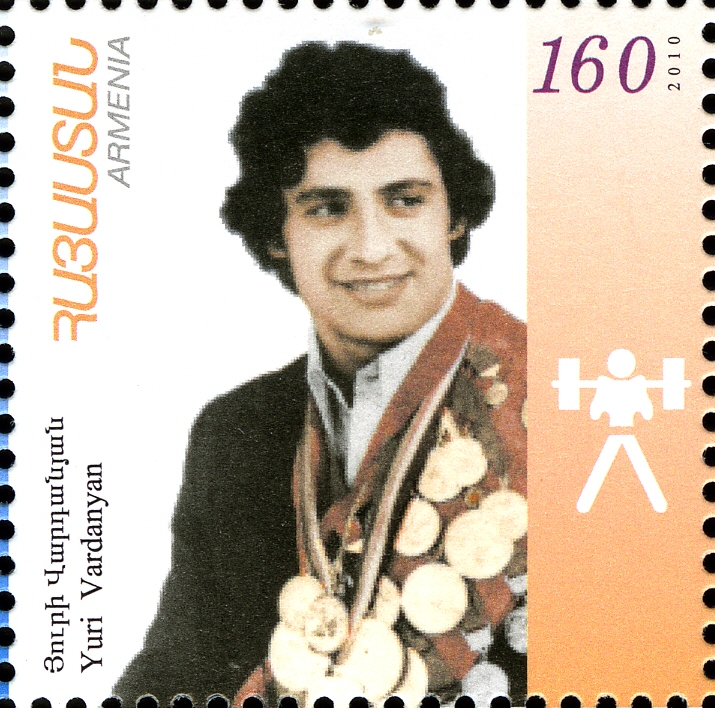
Vardanyan on a 2010 Armenian stamp

Vardanyan met his wife Eleonora, a Russian athlete in the sport of luge, while training together in the USSR national sports selections. They got married in 1983 in Armenia. The couple have three sons: David (b. 1983), Norayr (b. 1987) and Michael (b. 1995). Their middle son, Norayr Vardanyan, is an Olympic weightlifter who represented Armenia in the 2012 Olympics and who now represents the United States.

Vardanyan moved to the United States in 1992 and settled in Los Angeles. He claimed that he had some political disagreements with then-President Levon Ter-Petrosyan and that served as a reason for him to move to the United States. He came back to Armenia in 2009.

On 8 October 2010, Vardanyan was in a car accident when his vehicle hit a tractor on the Yerevan-Gyumri highway. He was taken to a hospital in Ashtarak and was later transferred to Nairi Medical Center. Vardanyan received emergency surgery on a thigh bone and he sustained shin injuries, but recovered.

Vardanyan was hospitalized in the Erebuni medical center for an unknown reason on 22 April 2011. Doctors stated his condition was "grave but stable." That same day, Vardanyan was diagnosed with an embolism and during surgery for lower leg reconstruction, his heart stopped. He slipped into a coma. His condition was reported stable a few days later and he was released from the hospital on 13 May 2011.

To this day, Vardanyan is hailed as a hero in Armenia for his deeds in the sport of weightlifting. A stamp of Vardanyan was printed in 2010 in honor of him.

Yuri Vardanyan died on 1 November 2018 at the age of 62.

== Political career ==
On 2 April 2009 Vardayan was appointed as an advisor to President Serzh Sargsyan.

On 8 May 2013 Vardanyan was appointed Minister of Sport and Youth Affairs. Introducing Vardanyan as a new member of his cabinet, Prime Minister Tigran Sargsyan stated that he is "It would be hard to find a better candidate for this post as Mr. Vardanyan knows very well the needs of athletes, their living conditions, and what should be done to promote sports in our country. From this perspective, we do believe that his long experience and knowledge may bring about a breakthrough in this field."

On 24 June 2014 Vardanyan was appointed Armenia's ambassador to Georgia. This move was negatively received by diplomats and politicians. For instance, Armenia's ex-Foreign Minister Alexander Arzumanyan said he deeply respects Vardanyan's achievements in sport, but questioned Vardanyan's knowledge of Armenian-Georgian relations. Defending the decision, ruling Republican Party Georgian-born MP Shirak Torosyan claimed that "Armenia has never appointed a professional ambassador to Georgia ever since gaining independence" and that "Individuals accomplished in different areas have been appointed but they were never diplomats. So it has become a kind of tradition. As for the Armenian-Georgian relations, I don’t think they have to be linked to the ambassador’s work. The ambassador is just required to use his potential to better develop those relations."

== Major results ==
Year	Venue	Weight	Snatch (kg)				Clean & Jerk (kg)				Total	Rank
Year	Venue	Weight	1	2	3	Rank	1	2	3	Rank	Total	Rank
Olympic Games
1980	Moscow, Soviet Union	82.5 kg	165.0	172.5	177.5 WR	1	205.0	215.5 WR	222.5 WR	1	400 WR	1st place, gold medalist(s)

== Achievements ==
- Senior world champion (1977–81, 1983, and 1985);
- Silver medalist in Senior World Championships (1982);
- Senior European champion (1977, 1978, 1980, 1981, and 1983);
- Silver medalist in Senior European Championships (1982 and 1984);
- All-time senior world record holder in total (405 kg competing at 82.5 kg);
- Multiple senior world record holder in total (1978–92);
- USSR champion (1977, 1979–82);
- Held the world record of 405 kg, in the total at 82.5 kg weight class before the reconstruction of the weight classes in 1992.

== Career bests ==
- Snatch: 182.5 kg in class to 82.5 kg.
- Snatch: 190.0 kg in class to 90 kg.
- Clean and jerk: 224.0 kg in class to 82.5 kg.
- Clean and jerk: 228.0 kg in class to 90 kg.
- Total: 405.0 kg in class to 82.5 kg.
- Total: 415.0 kg in class to 90 kg.

== Bibliography ==
- I. Sosnovsky (1982). Yurik Vardanian. Heroes of the Olympic Games (in Russian). Moscow: Fizkultura i sport. Archived from the original on 27 September 2007.
