= Aleksandr Gunyashev =

Soviet weightlifter (born 1959)

Personal information
- Born: 22 December 1959 (age 66) Chelyabinsk-40, Chelyabinsk Oblast, Russian SFSR, Soviet Union

Sport
- Sport: Weightlifting
- Club: Dynamo Taganrog
- Coached by: David Rigert
Medal record
Representing Soviet Union
World Championships
Silver medal – second place	1985 Södertälje	+110 kg
European Championships
Gold medal – first place	1985 Katowice	+110 kg

Aleksandr Nikolayevich Gunyashev (Russian: Александр Николаевич Гуняшев, born 22 December 1959) is a retired Russian super-heavyweight weightlifter. He won the European title in 1985, placing second at the world championships the same year. In 1983–1984 he set six world records: four in the snatch and two in the total. His younger brother Sergey won a bronze medal at the 1991 European Championships in the super-heavyweight division.
