= Stanisław Małysa =

Polish weightlifter

Personal information
- Nationality: Polish
- Born: 20 June 1960 (age 64); Strzałkowo, Poland

Sport
- Sport: Weightlifting

Stanisław Małysa (born 20 June 1960) is a Polish weightlifter. He competed in the men's heavyweight II event at the 1988 Summer Olympics.
