= Zdravko Stoichkov =

Bulgarian weightlifter (born 1964)

Personal information
- Born: July 2, 1964 (age 61)
- Weight: 75 to 82.5 kg (165 to 182 lb)
Medal record
Men's Weightlifting
Representing Bulgaria
World Championships
| Bronze medal – third place | 1983 Moscow | –75 kg |
European Championships
| Bronze medal – third place | 1983 Moscow | –75 kg |
| Gold medal – first place | 1984 Vitoria | –75 kg |
| Silver medal – second place | 1985 Katowice | –82.5 kg |
Friendship Games
| Gold medal – first place | 1984 Varna | –75 kg |
EWF European Team Cup
| Gold medal – first place | 1986 Reims | –82,5 kg |
| Gold medal – first place | 1987 Miskolc | –82,5 kg |
Australia Games
| Gold medal – first place | 1985 Melbourne | –82,5 kg |
IWF World Cup
| Gold medal – first place | 1987 Pazardzhik | –82,5 kg |
| Silver medal – second place | 1987 Budapest | –82,5 kg |
| Silver medal – second place | 1985 Zalaegerszeg | –82,5 kg |
Junior World Championships
| Gold medal – first place | 1983 Cairo | –75 kg |
Junior European Championships
| Gold medal – first place | 1983 San Marino | –75 kg |
Balkan Championships
| Gold medal – first place | 1983 Thessaloniki | –82,5 kg |
Rekord-Meeting
| Gold medal – first place | 1983 Langbathsee | –75 kg |
Danube Cup
| Gold medal – first place | 1984 Vidin | –82,5 kg |
| Silver medal – second place | 1987 Budapest | –82,5 kg |
Bulgarian Weightlifting Championships
| Silver medal – second place | 1984 Varna | –82.5 kg |
| Silver medal – second place | 1986 Kardzhali | –82,5 kg |
| Bronze medal – third place | 1987 Yambol | –82.5 kg |
| Bronze medal – third place | 1988 Sliven | –82.5 kg |
| Bronze medal – third place | 1991 Haskovo | –82,5 kg |
| Bronze medal – third place | 1992 Shumen | –82.5 kg |
Bulgaria Team Weightlifting Championships
| Gold medal – first place | 1987 Plovdiv | –82.5 kg |
Bulgarian Junior&Youth Championships
| Gold medal – first place | 1984 Haskovo | –82.5 kg |
| Silver medal – second place | 1978 Plovdiv | –48 kg |
| Bronze medal – third place | 1979 Plovdiv | –56 kg |
| Bronze medal – third place | 1980 Plovdiv | –67,5 kg |
| Bronze medal – third place | 1983 Varna | –75 kg |

Zdravko Stoichkov (Bulgarian: Здравко Стоичков; born 2 July 1964) is a Bulgarian weightlifter who competed in the 1980s. He won several World and European medals. He became a bronze medalist at the World Championship in Moscow at 75 kg in 1983. A year later, he was European champion in Vitoria, Spain, and in Friendship Games in Varna again became gold medalist to score much higher than the Olympic champion of Los Angeles. From this it becomes clear that the boycott of Bulgaria at the Games in 1984 deprived Stoichkov of a well-deserved Olympic title. He became second at the European Championship in Poland in 1985. Stoichkov is the winner of the European Weightlifting Cup for 1987 with the Bulgarian team in Miskolc, Hungary.

He set three world records in the 75 kg weight class. Stoichkov has a very long career. It started in 1977 and lasted until 2003. From 1977 to 1980 he competed for the club Svetkavitsa Targovishte. Then from 1981 to 1995 he was part of Slavia Sofia. Then in the period 1995-2003 Zdravko competed for the German club Durlach. His personal trainers were Peter Yordanov and Lyudmil Kochev. In the national team of Bulgaria he is trained by the legendary Ivan Abadzhiev.

In 2009 he became head coach of the men's national team of Bulgaria. Before that he was the coach of the national teams for juniors and cadets and won many medals from European Championships.
