= Gelu Radu =

Romanian weightlifter

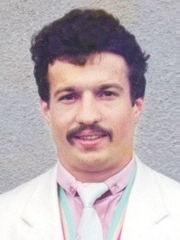

Personal information
- Born: November 3, 1957 (age 68) Adjud, Romania
- Height: 156 cm (5 ft 1 in)

Sport
- Sport: Weightlifting
Medal record
Representing Romania
Olympic Games
| Silver medal – second place | 1984 Los Angeles | -60 kg |
World Weightlifting Championships
| Bronze medal – third place | 1983 Moscow | -60 kg |
| Silver medal – second place | 1984 Los Angeles | -60 kg |
European Championships
| Bronze medal – third place | 1983 Moscow | -60 kg |

Gelu Radu (born 3 November 1957) is a retired Romanian featherweight weightlifter. He won a silver medal at the 1984 Olympics and a bronze at the 1983 World Championships.
