= Milan Cukovic =

Guamanian weightlifter

Personal information
- Nationality: Guamanian
- Born: 31 August 1945 (age 79)

Sport
- Sport: Weightlifting

Milan Cukovic (born 31 August 1945) is a Guamanian weightlifter. He competed in the men's heavyweight II event at the 1988 Summer Olympics.
