= Frank Juul Strømbo =

Danish weightlifter (born 1963)

Personal information
- Nationality: Danish
- Born: 15 February 1963 (age 62) Gentofte, Denmark

Sport
- Sport: Weightlifting

Frank Juul Strømbo (born 15 February 1963) is a Danish weightlifter. He competed in the men's heavyweight II event at the 1988 Summer Olympics.
