= Sergey Li =

Soviet weightlifter (born 1962)

Personal information
- Born: 5 August 1962 (age 63) Frunze, Kirghiz SSR, Soviet Union

Sport
- Sport: Weightlifting
- Coached by: Vladimir Li (father)
Medal record
Representing the Soviet Union
World Championships
Silver medal – second place	1987 Ostrava	-82.5 kg
Silver medal – second place	1990 Budapest	-82.5 kg
European Championships
Bronze medal – third place	1985 Katowice	-82.5 kg
Silver medal – second place	1988 Cardiff	-82.5 kg

Sergey Vladimirovich Li (Russian: Серге́й Влади́мирович Ли, born 5 August 1962) is a retired Soviet weightlifter of Korean origin. He won silver medals at the world championships in 1987 and 1990 and at the European championships in 1988.

Li took up weightlifting at the age of 12 and was trained by his father, who won the Soviet title in 1975 and trained the Kyrgyz weightlifting team.
