= Leonid Taranenko =

Belarusian retired weightlifter (born 1956)

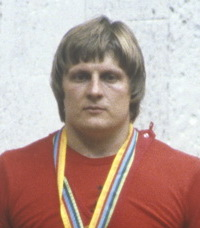
- Taranenko at 1980 Moscow Olympics

Personal information
- Born: June 13, 1956 (age 70) Malaryta, Byelorussian SSR, Soviet Union
Medal record
Men's weightlifting
Representing the Soviet Union
Olympic Games
Gold medal – first place	1980 Moscow	110 kg
World Weightlifting Championships
Bronze medal – third place	1979 Saloniki	110 kg
Gold medal – first place	1980 Moscow	110 kg
Silver medal – second place	1987 Ostrava	+110 kg
Gold medal – first place	1990 Budapest	+110 kg
European Weightlifting Championships
Gold medal – first place	1980 Beograd	110 kg
Silver medal – second place	1985 Katowice	+110 kg
Silver medal – second place	1986 Karl-Marx-Stadt	+110 kg
Gold medal – first place	1988 Cardiff	+110 kg
Bronze medal – third place	1990 Aalborg	+110 kg
Gold medal – first place	1991 Wladyslawowo	+110 kg
USSR Weightlifting Championships
Bronze medal – third place	1977 Ratov Na Donu	110 kg
Gold medal – first place	1979 Leningrad	110 kg
Gold medal – first place	1983 Moscow	110 kg
Gold medal – first place	1987 Arkhangelsk	+110 kg
Bronze medal – third place	1989 Frunze	+110 kg
Summer Spartakiad of the Soviet Union
Gold medal – first place	1979 Leningrad	110 kg
Gold medal – first place	1983 Moscow	110 kg
Cup of the Soviet Union
Gold medal – first place	1981 Donetsk	110 kg
Gold medal – first place	1982 Moscow	110 kg
Gold medal – first place	1986 Lipetsk	+110 kg
Representing the Unified Team
Olympic Games
Silver medal – second place	1992 Barcelona	+110 kg
Representing Belarus
European Weightlifting Championships
Gold medal – first place	1996 Stavanger	+108 kg

Leonid Arkadevich Taranenko (Russian: Леонид Аркадьевич Тараненко, born June 13, 1956) is a Belarusian retired weightlifter and coach who competed for the Soviet Union. His 266 kg clean and jerk in 1988 was the heaviest lift in competition for 33 years, until Lasha Talakhadze exceeded it, lifting 267 kg at the 2021 World Weightlifting Championships.

== Weightlifting career ==
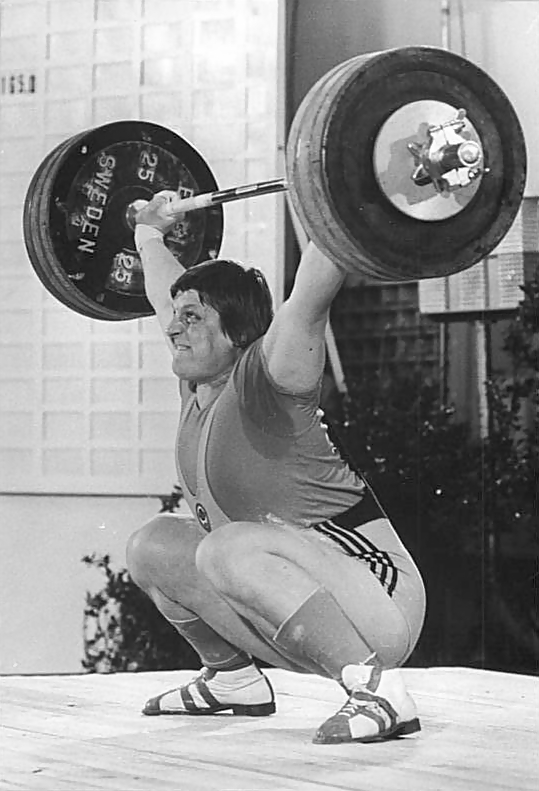
Taranenko in 1986

Taranenko trained at VSS Uradzhai in Minsk. His first major success took place at the 1980 Olympics, when, competing for the Soviet Union, he won the gold medal in the 110 kilogram class with a 422.5 kg total.

He was unable to compete in the 1984 Olympics in Los Angeles due to the Soviet boycott, but competed in the 1984 Friendship Games, where he won the 110 kg class with a world record total of 442.5 kg, exceeding the winning total in Los Angeles (by Norberto Oberburger) by 52.5 kg.

After this, Taranenko moved up to the super-heavyweight class. Lifting in Canberra, Australia on November 26, 1988, he set a world record of 266 kg in the clean and jerk, and 476 kg in the total, having lifted 210 kg in the snatch.

While these results are no longer recognized as official world records due to subsequent restructuring of the competitive weight classes (in 1993, 1998 and 2018), as of 2019, his 266 kg clean and jerk remained the highest ever achieved in competition till broken December 2021 by Lasha Talakhadze’s 267 kg, while his total of 476 kg remained the highest ever achieved until broken by Lasha Talakhadze of Georgia at the 2019 World Weightlifting Championships while also setting the new clean and jerk record of 264 kg for the restructured weight classes. He achieved this by breaking Hossein Rezazadeh's world record from 2004 Summer Olympics in Athens for 263.5 kg.

In 1992, Taranenko represented the Unified Team at the Olympics in Barcelona. He took the silver medal in the super-heavyweight class with a total of 425 kg.

Taranenko's other victories include the 110 kg class titles at the 1980 World and European championships, and super-heavyweight titles at the 1990 World championship and 1988, 1991, and 1996 European championships.

Taranenko has served as a coach for female weightlifters in India.

In 2017, Taranenko admitted having used performance-enhancing drugs.

=== Career bests ===
- Snatch: 210 kg in the class over 110 kg
- Clean and jerk: 266 kg (No longer an official world record due to restructuring of weight classes)
- Total: 442.5 kg (200 + 242.5) 1984 at the Friendship Games in Varna, Bulgaria, 110 kg class
- Total: 476 kg (210 + 266), at Canberra, Australia on November 26, 1988, 110+ kg class.
- Back Squat: 380 kg with a two-second pause at the bottom
- Front Squat: 300 kg for three reps
- Olympic Press: 230 kg

== Major result ==
Year	Venue	Weight	Snatch (kg)				Clean & Jerk (kg)				Total	Rank
Year	Venue	Weight	1	2	3	Rank	1	2	3	Rank	Total	Rank
Olympic Games
1980	Moscow, Soviet Union	110 kg	~~182.5~~	182.5	~~190~~	2	220	235	240	1	422.5	1st place, gold medalist(s)
1992	Barcelona, Spain	+110 kg	~~187.5~~	187.5	--	2	232.5	237.5	~~242.5~~	2	425	2nd place, silver medalist(s)
1996	Atlanta, United States	+108 kg	--	--	--	--	--	--	--	--	--	--
World Championships
1979	Thessaloniki, Greece	110 kg		175	182.5	2nd place, silver medalist(s)	220			5	402.5	3rd place, bronze medalist(s)
1980	Moscow, Soviet Union	110 kg	~~182.5~~	182.5	~~190~~	2nd place, silver medalist(s)	220	235	240	1st place, gold medalist(s)	422.5	1st place, gold medalist(s)
1985	Södertälje, Sweden	+110 kg	185			3rd place, bronze medalist(s)	232.5			5	417.5	4
1986	Sofia, Bulgaria	+110 kg	200			2nd place, silver medalist(s)				--	--	--
1987	Ostrava, Czechoslovakia	+110 kg		202.5		3rd place, bronze medalist(s)	245	257.5	265.5	1st place, gold medalist(s)	467.5	2nd place, silver medalist(s)
1990	Budapest, Hungary	+110 kg	195			1st place, gold medalist(s)	255			1st place, gold medalist(s)	450	1st place, gold medalist(s)
1993	Melbourne, Australia	+108 kg	185	190	~~195~~	4	232.5	~~242.5~~	--	5	422.5	4
European Championships
1980	(Socialist Federal Republic of Yugoslavia) Belgrade, Yugoslavia	110 kg	190			1st place, gold medalist(s)	230			1st place, gold medalist(s)	420	1st place, gold medalist(s)
1985	Katowice, Poland	+110 kg	185			2nd place, silver medalist(s)	230			1st place, gold medalist(s)	415	2nd place, silver medalist(s)
1986	Karl-Marx-Stadt, East Germany	+110 kg	195			2nd place, silver medalist(s)	242.5			1st place, gold medalist(s)	437.5	2nd place, silver medalist(s)
1988	Cardiff, United Kingdom	+110 kg	207.5			1st place, gold medalist(s)	255			2nd place, silver medalist(s)	462.5	1st place, gold medalist(s)
1990	Ålborg, Denmark	+110 kg	205			2nd place, silver medalist(s)	247.5			3rd place, bronze medalist(s)	452.5	3rd place, bronze medalist(s)
1991	Władysławowo, Poland	+110 kg	200			1st place, gold medalist(s)	247.5			1st place, gold medalist(s)	447.5	1st place, gold medalist(s)
1996	Stavanger, Norway	+108 kg	~~180~~	180	182.5	2nd place, silver medalist(s)	220	227.5	232.5	2nd place, silver medalist(s)	415	1st place, gold medalist(s)
USSR Weightlifting Championships
Summer Spartakiad of the Soviet Union
Cup of the Soviet Union
