= Viktor Solodov =

Russian weightlifter (born 1962)

Personal information
- Born: 15 June 1962 (age 64) Myski, Kemerovo Oblast, Russian SFSR, Soviet Union

Sport
- Sport: Weightlifting
- Coached by: Viktor Reinbold
Medal record
Representing the Soviet Union
World Championships
Silver medal – second place	1983 Moscow	-90 kg
Gold medal – first place	1985 Södertälje	-90 kg
Silver medal – second place	1986 Sofia	-90 kg
European Championships
Silver medal – second place	1983 Moscow	-90 kg
Gold medal – first place	1984 Vitoria	-90 kg
Gold medal – first place	1985 Katowice	-90 kg
Silver medal – second place	1986 Karl-Marx-Stadt	-90 kg

Viktor Viktorovich Solodov (Russian: Виктор Викторович Солодов; born 15 June 1962) is a retired Russian weightlifter. Between 1983 and 1986 he won three gold and four silver medals at the world and European championships and set four ratified world records. He missed the 1984 Summer Olympics due to their boycott by the Soviet Union and the 1988 Summer Olympics due to an injury.

Solodov retired in 1990 and later worked as a weightlifting administrator and international referee. He is married and has two sons and one daughter.
