= Aleksandr Kurlovich =

Belarusian weightlifter

Personal information
- Nationality: Soviet Union
- Born: Aleksandr Nikolaevich Kurlovich; 28 July 1961 Grodno, Soviet Union
- Died: 6 April 2018 (aged 56) Grodno, Belarus
- Height: 1.85 m (6 ft 1 in)

Sport
- Country: Soviet Union; Belarus
- Sport: Weightlifting
- Event: +110 kg

Achievements and titles
- Personal bests: Snatch: 215 kg (1989), Clean and jerk: 260 kg (1987), Total: 472 kg (1987)
Medal record
Men's weightlifting
Representing the Soviet Union
Olympic Games
Gold medal – first place	1988 Seoul	+110 kg
World Weightlifting Championships
Gold medal – first place	1987 Ostrava	+110kg
Gold medal – first place	1989 Athens	+110kg
Gold medal – first place	1991 Donaueschingen	+110kg
Silver medal – second place	1983 Moscow	+110kg
European Weightlifting Championships
Gold medal – first place	1989 Athens	+110kg
Gold medal – first place	1990 Aalborg	+110kg
Silver medal – second place	1983 Moscow	+110kg
USSR Weightlifting Championships
Gold medal – first place	1983 Moscow	+110kg
Gold medal – first place	1989 Frunze	+110kg
Gold medal – first place	1991 Donetsk	+110kg
Silver medal – second place	1984 Minsk	+110kg
Silver medal – second place	1987 Arkhangelsk	+110kg
Representing the Unified Team
Olympic Games
Gold medal – first place	1992 Barcelona	+110 kg
Representing Belarus
World Weightlifting Championships
Gold medal – first place	1994 Istanbul	+108kg

Aleksandr Nikolaevich Kurlovich (Russian: Александр Николаевич Курлович, English Alternate: Alexander Kurlovich, 28 July 1961 – 6 April 2018) was a Soviet and Belarusian weightlifter. He trained at Armed Forces sports society in Grodno.

In 2006 he was elected member of the International Weightlifting Federation Hall of Fame. He was caught in 1984 entering Canada with $10,000 worth of anabolic steroids that he wanted to sell to fellow weightlifters.

== Career ==
Kurlovich had twelve world records to his name.

As of 2019, only four men (Antonio Krastev of Bulgaria, Behdad Salimi of Iran, Gor Minasyan of Armenia and Bahrain, and Georgian world-record holder Lasha Talakhadze) have ever snatched more than his 215 kg, only six men (Soviet teammates Sergey Didyk, Anatoly Pisarenko and Leonid Taranenko, Andrei Chemerkin of Russia, Talakhadze of Georgia, and Hossein Rezazadeh of Iran) have ever lifted a clean and jerk of more than his 260 kg, and only Talakhadze, Rezazadeh, and Taranenko have totalled more than the 472.5 kg that Kurlovich lifted to win the 1987 World Championship. (Taranenko won 1987 World Championship)

== Honors ==
- Merited Master of Sport of the USSR (1987)
- Order of the Badge of Honour
- Honored Worker of Physical Culture of the Republic of Belarus (1992)

== Weightlifting achievements ==
- Olympic champion (1988 and 1992);
- Senior world champion (1987, 1989, 1991 and 1994);
- Set twelve world records during his career.

== Career bests ==
- Snatch: 215.0 kg in Athens 1989 World Weightlifting Championships.
- Clean and jerk: 260.0 kg in Ostrava 1987 World Weightlifting Championships.
- Total: 472.5 kg (212.5 + 260.0) 1987 in Ostrava in the class more than 110 kg.

== Death ==
Kurlovich died on 6 April 2018 in Grodno, Belarus. He was 56.

== Major results ==
Year	Venue	Weight	Snatch (kg)				Clean & Jerk (kg)				Total	Rank
Year	Venue	Weight	1	2	3	Rank	1	2	3	Rank	Total	Rank
Olympic Games
1988	Seoul, South Korea	+110 kg	202.5	207.5	212.5	1	245.0	~~250.0~~	250.0	1	462.5	1st place, gold medalist(s)
1992	Barcelona, Spain	+110 kg	195.0	200.0	205.0	1	237.5	245.0	~~250.0~~	1	450	1st place, gold medalist(s)
1996	Atlanta, United States	+108 kg	~~195.0~~	~~195.0~~	195.0	4	230.0	~~247.5~~	--	7	425.0	5
World Championships
1983	Moscow, Soviet Union	+110 kg	195	200	205	2nd place, silver medalist(s)	~~245~~	245	~~262.5~~	2nd place, silver medalist(s)	450.0	2nd place, silver medalist(s)
1987	Ostrava, Czechoslovakia	+110 kg	205	210	212.5	2nd place, silver medalist(s)	247.5	260	~~266~~	2nd place, silver medalist(s)	472.5 WR	1st place, gold medalist(s)
1989	Athens, Greece	+110 kg	202.5	210.0	215.0	1st place, gold medalist(s)	240.0	245.0	~~262.5~~	1st place, gold medalist(s)	460.0	1st place, gold medalist(s)
1991	Donaueschingen, Germany	+110 kg	195.0	202.5	205.0	1st place, gold medalist(s)	237.5	250.0	~~262.5~~	1st place, gold medalist(s)	455.0	1st place, gold medalist(s)
1994	Istanbul, Turkey	+108 kg	197.5	203.0 WR	205.0 WR	1st place, gold medalist(s)	240.0	250.5 WR	253.0 WR	1st place, gold medalist(s)	457.5 WR	1st place, gold medalist(s)
