= Asen Zlatev =

Bulgarian weightlifter (born 1960)

Medal record

Representing Bulgaria

Men's weightlifting

Olympic Games
Gold medal – first place	1980 Moscow	-75 kg

World Weightlifting Championships
Gold medal – first place	1980 Moscow	-75 kg
Gold medal – first place	1982 Ljubljana	-82.5 kg
Gold medal – first place	1986 Sofia	-82.5 kg
Silver medal – second place	1981 Lille	-82.5 kg
Silver medal – second place	1983 Moscow	-82.5 kg
Silver medal – second place	1985 Södertälje	-82.5 kg
Bronze medal – third place	1987 Ostrava	-82.5 kg

European Weightlifting Championships
Gold medal – first place	1980 Belgrade	-75 kg
Gold medal – first place	1982 Ljubljana	-82.5 kg
Gold medal – first place	1984 Vittorio	-82.5 kg
Gold medal – first place	1985 Katowice	-82.5 kg
Gold medal – first place	1987 Reims	-82.5 kg
Silver medal – second place	1981 Lille	-82.5 kg
Silver medal – second place	1983 Moscow	-82.5 kg
Silver medal – second place	1986 Karl-Marx-Stadt	-82.5 kg

IWF World Cup Final
Gold medal – first place	1986 Melbourne	-82,5 kg
Bronze medal – third place	1984 Sarajevo	-82,5 kg
Bronze medal – third place	1983 Tokyo	-82,5 kg

IWF World Cup Overall
Silver medal – second place	1984 Sarajevo	-82,5 kg
Silver medal – second place	1985 Monte Carlo	-82,5 kg

IWF World Cup
Gold medal – first place	1981 Athens	-82,5 kg
Gold medal – first place	1982 Atlantic City	-82,5 kg
Gold medal – first place	1982 Tatabanya	-82,5 kg
Gold medal – first place	1983 Budapest	-82.5 kg
Gold medal – first place	1983 Allentown	-82.5 kg
Silver medal – second place	1984 Budapest	-82.5 kg

Friendship Games
Silver medal – second place	1984 Varna	-82,5 kg

Australia Games
Gold medal – first place	1985 Melbourne	-90 kg

Bundesliga Team Championships
Gold medal – first place	1992 Berlin	-82.5 kg
Bronze medal – third place	1994 Chemnitz	-82.5 kg

Bulgarian Weightlifting Championships
Gold medal – first place	1982 Varna	-82,5 kg
Gold medal – first place	1983 Varna	-82,5 kg
Gold medal – first place	1984 Varna	-82,5 kg
Gold medal – first place	1986 Kardzhali	-82,5 kg
Gold medal – first place	1987 Yambol	-82,5 kg
Gold medal – first place	1988 Sliven	-82,5 kg

Bulgaria Team Weightlifting Championships
Gold medal – first place	1985 Kardzhali	-82,5 kg
Gold medal – first place	1983 Varna	-90 kg
Gold medal – first place	1982 Varna	-82,5 kg
Gold medal – first place	1982 Pleven	-82,5 kg
Gold medal – first place	1981 Varna	-82,5 kg

Asen Zlatev (Bulgarian: Асен Златев; born 23 May 1960) is a former Bulgarian weightlifter.

== Biography ==
Zlatev is an Olympic champion from the Moscow 1980 Olympic Games in Russia, in the category of up to 75 kg. At the age of 11 he joined the first group of weight lifting trainees in the Vasil Levski Sports School under the leadership of Gancho Karushkov. Zlatev has won three gold medals at World Championships (1980, 1982 and 1986) and five at European Championships (1980, 1982, 1984, 1985 and 1987). From World Championships he has 7 medals (3 gold, 3 silver, 1 bronze), and from European Championships – 8 medals (5 gold, 3 silver). He is ranked second with the number of medals won in total and leads the ranking among Bulgarians by the number of medals won in Olympic Games, World Championships and European Championships in snatch, clean and jerk and total – 22 gold, 19 silver, 4 bronze. For seven years Zlatev improved 20 world and 6 Olympic records. He is one of the three Bulgarians (together with Nikolay Peshalov and Ivan Ivanov) who has not received a "zero" in an official competition. Zlatev was awarded the Golden Kilo award for best achievement at the World Championships in Ljubljana, Slovenia in 1982. He was captain of the national team for 8 years and did not lost national competition for 13 seasons. He competed in the categories up to 75 kg and up to 82.5 kg and was trained for several Olympic Games, but for various reasons he participated only in one – in Moscow, Russia. From September 1989 until the end of 1994 Zlatev competed for the German teams AC Germania St. Ilgen and Chemnitz. With the first, he was the Bundesliga weightlifting champion in 1992, and with the second - a bronze medalist in 1994. Zlatev was declared honorary citizen of Plovdiv in 2001. He was voted Sportsperson of the Year for Bulgaria in 1986. Zlatev won the World Cup final in 1986 in Melbourne and was third in the finals twice - in 1983 in Tokyo and 1984 in Sarajevo. Twice he was second in the final standings in the World Cup - in 1984 and 1985. In 1985, he became the champion of the Australian Open Games. In 1982, he won first place in the 82.5 kg category at the World Cup tournament in Atlantic City and Tatabanya. In 1983 - in Allentown, Pennsylvania and Budapest.

Zlatev was originally intended to represent Bulgaria at the 1988 Olympic Games in the Light Heavyweight (82,5 kg) category. However, two of his teammates who had won gold medals in their weight classes tested positive for banned substances, and the Bulgarian weightlifting federation pulled the rest of the team out of the competition the day before Zlatev was scheduled to compete. At the time, Zlatev was a three-time World champion and five-time European champion, and a heavy favorite for the gold medal.

Zlatev competed at the 2017 World Masters Games in Auckland, New Zealand, in the M 55-59 year group as a 69 kg lifter. He won silver with 78 kg in the Snatch and 90 kg in the Clean and Jerk, being turned down with 95 kg on his 2nd and 3rd attempts to win with a press out.

== Career bests ==
- Snatch: 183.0 kg (WR) 1986 in Melbourne in the 82.5 kg class.
- Clean and jerk: 225.0 kg (WR) 1986 in Sofia in the 82.5 kg class.
- Total: 405.0 kg (180.0+225.0) 1986 in Sofia in the 82.5 kg class.
