= Neno Terziyski =

Bulgarian weightlifter

Personal information
- Born: 23 March 1964 (age 62) Bulgaria
- Weight: 52 to 60 kg (115 to 132 lb)
Medal record
Men's Weightlifting
Representing Bulgaria
World Championships
Gold medal – first place	1983 Moscow	–52 kg
Gold medal – first place	1985 Södertälje	–56 kg
Gold medal – first place	1987 Ostrava	–56 kg
European Championships
Gold medal – first place	1983 Moscow	–52 kg
Gold medal – first place	1984 Vitoria	–52 kg
Gold medal – first place	1985 Katowice	–56 kg
Gold medal – first place	1986 Karl-Marx-Stadt	–56 kg
Silver medal – second place	1988 Cardiff	–56 kg
Friendship Games
Gold medal – first place	1984 Varna	–52 kg
IWF World Cup
Gold medal – first place	1984 Budapest	–56 kg
Gold medal – first place	1988 Budapest	–67,5 kg
EWF European Team Cup
Gold medal – first place	1987 Miskolc	–67,5 kg
Gold medal – first place	1988 Angers	–67,5 kg
Australia Games
Gold medal – first place	1985 Melbourne	–56 kg
Junior World Championships
Silver medal – second place	1982 São Paulo	–52 kg
Gold medal – first place	1983 Cairo	–52 kg

Neno Stoyanov Terziyski (Bulgarian: Нено Стоянов Терзийски; born 23 March 1964) is a Bulgarian weightlifter who competed in the 1980s and 1990s. He won three World and four European championships and competed in the 1992 Summer Olympics, finishing fourth.

He set eleven world records in the 52 and one in the 56 kg weight class.

From 2004 to 2007 he was head coach of the Bulgarian men's weightlifting team.
