= Senno Salzwedel =

German weightlifter (born 1959)

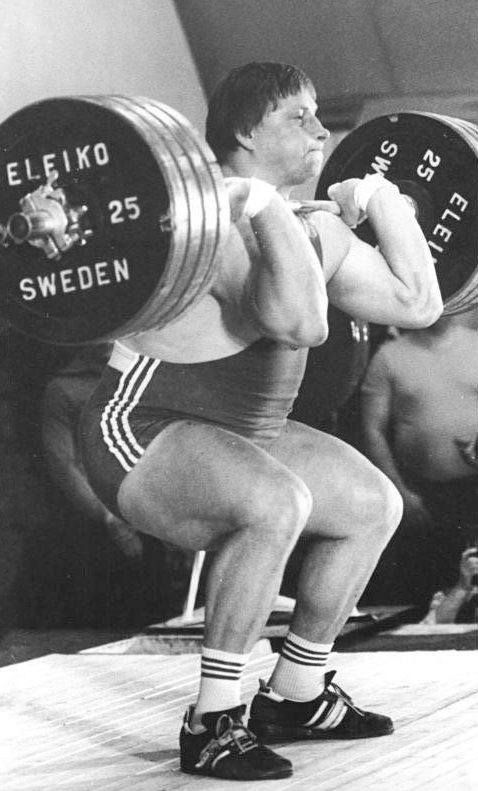
- Senno Salzwedel in 1985

Personal information
- Born: 24 August 1959 Waren (Müritz), Germany
- Died: 27 October 2023 (aged 64)

Sport
- Sport: Weightlifting
Medal record
Representing East Germany
World Weightlifting Championships
Silver medal – second place	1981 Lille	+110 kg
European Weightlifting Championships
Silver medal – second place	1981 Lille	+110 kg
Bronze medal – third place	1984 Vittoria	+110 kg
Bronze medal – third place	1985 Katowice	+110 kg
Bronze medal – third place	1986 Karl-Marx-Stadt	+110 kg

Senno Salzwedel (24 August 1959 – 27 October 2023) was a German weightlifter. He won silver medals at the world and European championships in 1981, as well as three bronze medals at the European championships of 1984–1986. At the 1985 World Weightlifting Championships he placed first in the clean and jerk, but finished outside the podium overall.
