= Anatoly Pisarenko =

Soviet weightlifter (born 1958)

Personal information
- Nationality: Soviet Union
- Born: Anatoly Grigor'evich Pisarenko; 10 January 1958 (age 68) Kyiv, Soviet Union
- Height: 1.85 m (6 ft 1 in)
- Weight: 120 kg (265 lb)

Sport
- Country: Soviet Union
- Sport: Weightlifting
- Event: +110 kg

Achievements and titles
- Personal bests: Snatch: 206 kg (1983), Clean and jerk: 265 kg (1984), Total: 465 kg (1984)
Medal record
Representing the Soviet Union
Men's weightlifting
World Championships
Gold medal – first place	1981 Lille	+110 kg
Gold medal – first place	1982 Ljubljana	+110 kg
Gold medal – first place	1983 Moscow	+110 kg
European Championships
Gold medal – first place	1981 Lille	+110 kg
Gold medal – first place	1982 Ljubljana	+110 kg
Gold medal – first place	1983 Moscow	+110 kg
Gold medal – first place	1984 Vittorio	+110 kg

Anatoly Grigor'evich Pisarenko (Russian: Анатолий Григорьевич Писаренко, Ukrainian: Анатолій Григорович Писаренко, Anatoliy Hryhorovych Pysarenko; born January 10, 1958) is a former Soviet Olympic weightlifter from Ukraine. Along with Aleksandr Kurlovich, he became better known in 1985 due to the international scandal when both of them were caught by the Canadian customs in possession of steroids.

He was born in Kyiv, where he trained at the local Dynamo.

Pisarenko held multiple world records in the snatch and clean and jerk, and was named weightlifting's "most iconic athlete" by Weightlifting House in 2023. After Pisarenko was caught with Aleksandr Kurlovich, he was given a lifetime ban by the Soviet Weightlifting Federation. None of the Soviet people were allowed to travel freely on their own, only on the government (official) arrangements.

After the dissolution of the Soviet Union, Anatoliy Pysarenko was the chairman of the Ukrainian Federation of Powerlifting from 1994 to 2012. From 2002 to 2005, he was elected as the People's Deputy of Ukraine (affiliated). In the Verkhovna Rada, he became a member of the Social Democratic Party of Ukraine (united) parliamentary faction.

== Major results ==
Year	Venue	Weight	Snatch (kg)				Clean & Jerk (kg)				Total	Rank
Year	Venue	Weight	1	2	3	Rank	1	2	3	Rank	Total	Rank
World Championships
1981^{[a]}	Lille, France	+110 kg	187.5			1st place, gold medalist(s)	237.5			1st place, gold medalist(s)	425	1st place, gold medalist(s)
1982^{[a]}	(Socialist Federal Republic of Yugoslavia) Ljubljana, SFR Yugoslavia	+110 kg	197.5			2nd place, silver medalist(s)	247.5			1st place, gold medalist(s)	445	1st place, gold medalist(s)
1983^{[a]}	Moscow, Soviet Union	+110 kg	205			1st place, gold medalist(s)	245			1st place, gold medalist(s)	450	1st place, gold medalist(s)
European Championships
1984	Vitoria-Gasteiz, Spain	+110 kg	200			1st place, gold medalist(s)	250			1st place, gold medalist(s)	450	1st place, gold medalist(s)

- ^{a} This tournament was counted as European Weightlifting Championships of the corresponding year.

=== World records by Anatoly Pisarenko ===
He set thirteen World records in career.

Year	Lift type	Result	Weight class	Location
1981	Snatch	201.5 kg	Super heavyweight	Podolsk
1981	Total (2)	447.5 kg	Super heavyweight	Podolsk
1982	Snatch	202.5 kg	Super heavyweight	Dnipropetrovsk
1982	Clean and jerk	258.0 kg	Super heavyweight	Frunze
1982	Clean and jerk	258.5 kg	Super heavyweight	Dnipropetrovsk
1982	Total (2)	450.0 kg	Super heavyweight	Frunze
1982	Total (2)	455.0 kg	Super heavyweight	Frunze
1982	Total (2)	457.5 kg	Super heavyweight	Dnipropetrovsk
1983	Snatch	203.0 kg	Super heavyweight	Odessa
1983	Snatch	205.0 kg	Super heavyweight	Moscow
1983	Snatch	206.0 kg	Super heavyweight	Moscow
1983	Clean and jerk	260.5 kg	Super heavyweight	Allentown
1984	Clean and jerk	265.0 kg	Super heavyweight	Varna
