= Frank Mavius =

German weightlifter (born 1956)

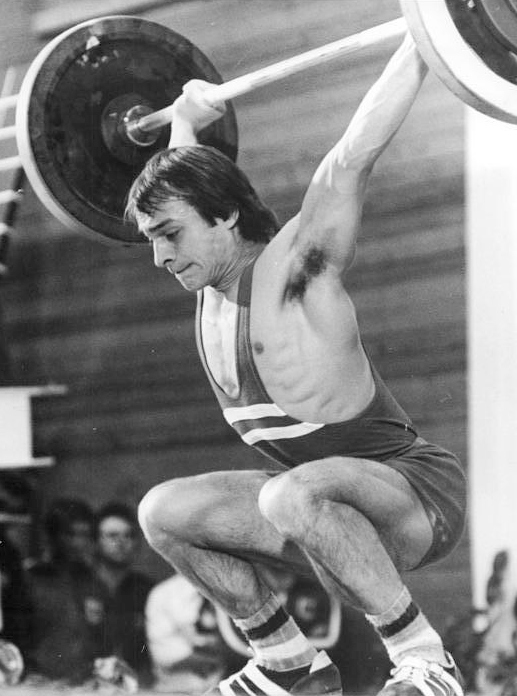
- Frank Mavius in 1978

Personal information
- Born: 12 March 1956 (age 70) Görlitz, East Germany
- Height: 1.57 m (5 ft 2 in)

Sport
- Sport: Weightlifting
- Coached by: Karl Arnold
Medal record
Representing East Germany
European Weightlifting Championships
Bronze medal – third place	1977 Stuttgart	Bantamweight
Bronze medal – third place	1980 Belgrade	Bantamweight
Silver medal – second place	1984 Vittorio	Bantamweight
Bronze medal – third place	1985 Katowice	Bantamweight

Frank Mavius (born 12 March 1956) is a retired East German weightlifter who won four medals in the bantamweight category (56 kg) at the European championships of 1977–1985. He was also placed third in individual events at the 1977 and 1982 World championships.

Mavius took up weightlifting in 1971 and around then moved from Görlitz to Dresden, where he had better training conditions. He is married to Ursel, a teacher, and has two daughters, Linda and Vilma.
