= Vladimir Kuznetsov (weightlifter, born 1963) =

Soviet weightlifter

Personal information
- Born: 5 November 1963 (age 62)

Sport
- Country: Soviet Union
- Sport: Weightlifting
- Weight class: 75 kg
- Team: National team
Medal record
Men's Weightlifting
Representing Soviet Union
World Championships
Silver medal – second place	1983 Moscow	75 kg
- Updated on 6 October 2016

Vladimir Kuznetsov (born 5 November 1963) is a Soviet male former weightlifter, who competed in the middleweight class and represented Soviet Union at international competitions. He won the silver medal at the 1983 World Weightlifting Championships in the 75 kg category.
