= Pavel Kuznetsov (weightlifter) =

Soviet weightlifter (born 1961)

Medal record

Men's weightlifting

Representing the Soviet Union

Olympic Games
Gold medal – first place	1988 Seoul	–100 kg

World Championships
Bronze medal – third place	1989 Athens	–100 kg
Gold medal – first place	1987 Ostrava	–100 kg
Silver medal – second place	1985 Södertälje	–100 kg
Gold medal – first place	1983 Moscow	–100 kg

Pavel Kuznetsov (Russian: Павел Викторович Кузнецов; born 10 July 1961) is a former Soviet weightlifter, Olympic champion and world champion. He won the gold medal in the heavyweight I class at the 1988 Summer Olympics in Seoul.
