= László Barsi (weightlifter) =

Hungarian weightlifter (born 1962)

Personal information
- Nationality: Hungarian
- Born: 16 July 1962 (age 62); Miskolc, Hungary

Sport
- Sport: Weightlifting

László Barsi (born 16 July 1962) is a Hungarian weightlifter. He competed at the 1988 Summer Olympics and the 1992 Summer Olympics.
