= Robert Skolimowski =

Polish weightlifter (born 1956)

Personal information
- Nationality: Polish
- Born: 14 August 1956 (age 68); Warsaw, Poland

Sport
- Sport: Weightlifting

Robert Skolimowski (born 14 August 1956) is a Polish weightlifter. He competed in the men's super heavyweight event at the 1980 Summer Olympics.

He is the father of Kamila Skolimowska (1982–2009), Olympic gold medal-winning hammer thrower.
