= Australia Games =

Athletic competitions in Melbourne, Australia

Australia Games was held in Melbourne, Victoria, from 26 January to 5 February 1985.

== Background ==
The concept of the national festival of sport was first raised in John Bloomfield's report Role and Scope and Development of Recreation in Australia published in 1973. In 1981, a report titled Report on the Feasibility of Australia Games resulted in the Fraser government approving the staging of a national sports festival in 1983. The Australia Games Foundation was established and registered in Victoria as a trustee company in 1982. The Games were part of Victoria's 150th anniversary. The Games had several objectives: improve access to international competition for Australian athletes in their own environment, increase media exposure to non high-profile sports and to encourage the construction of new multi-purpose facilities of international standard.

Victoria was due to host the 1987 Games after Sydney and Brisbane decided not to host them due to the cost overruns on the inaugural Games. The 1987 Games did not occur due to cost issues. In 1986, it was estimated that the 1987 Games would cost $3.2 million. But the Games did not proceed after the Hawke government decided not to provide $500,000 in funding due to budgetary pressures and the Victorian Government decided not to fund the 1987 Games after uncertainty in its overall funding.

== Funding ==
The cost of staging the Games was estimated at $2 million. The Australian Government allocated $800,000 in the 1984-1985 budget and the Victorian Government provided $375,000.The balance came from the business sector. The major expenditure items were $700,000 international air travel, $200,000 for Domestic air travel and $300,000 for University of Melbourne accommodation charges.

Victorian auditor-general in a 1986 report detailed massive cost overruns in the management of the Games. The Victorian Government provided the Australia Games Foundation $920,000 more than the initial grant of $375,000.

Victorian Government estimated that the economic impact of the 1985 Games to the Victorian economy was $18.1 million.

== Summary ==
- 1,848 athletes (including 804 from overseas) from 31 countries.
- 928 officials and 1,396 volunteers
- Spectator attendance - 92,767
- Gate receipts - $364,966
- Integration of disabled athletes in to athletics, swimming, basketball, lawn bowls, netball and weightlifting competitions.
- Capacity crowds at the opening ceremony, basketball, gymnastics, aquatics, netball and surf life saving.
- Seven Network provided 70 hours of television coverage.

== Sports and venues ==
Sport	Venue
Athletics	Olympic Park Stadium
Badminton	Monash University; Melbourne Sports and Entertainment Centre
Basketball	Melbourne Sports and Entertainment Centre
Boxing	Festival Hall
Cycling	Northcote Cycling Velodrome
Diving	State Swimming Centre
Field hockey	Royal Park
Gymnastics	Melbourne Sports and Entertainment Centre
Judo	Albert Park
Lawn bowls	Doncaster Bowling Club
Netball	Festival Hall
Shooting sports	Geelong Small Bore Range; Melbourne Gun Club; Springvale Moving Target Range
Softball	Gilbert Park, Knox
Squash	Albert Park Squash Courts
Surf lifesaving	Ocean Grove
Swimming	State Swimming Centre
Synchronized swimming	State Swimming Centre
Trampolining	Croydon Leisure Centre
Volleyball	Morwell Sports Stadium; Corio Leisure Centre
Water polo	State Swimming Centre
Weightlifting	Hawthorn Recreation Centre
Wrestling	Footscray Institute of Technology
