= József Jacsó =

Hungarian weightlifter

Personal information
- Born: June 1, 1962 (age 64) Mezőkövesd, Borsod-Abaúj-Zemplén, Hungary
Medal record
Men's Weightlifting
Representing Hungary
Olympic Games
Silver medal – second place	1988 Seoul	110 Kg

József Jacsó is a Hungarian weightlifter. He won a Silver medal in the Heavyweight 110kg class at the 1988 Summer Olympics in Seoul.
