= Miloš Čiernik =

Slovak weightlifter (born 1963)

Personal information
- Nationality: Slovak
- Born: 19 January 1963 (age 62); Námestovo, Czechoslovakia

Sport
- Sport: Weightlifting

Miloš Čiernik (born 19 January 1963) is a Slovak weightlifter. He competed at the 1988 Summer Olympics and the 1992 Summer Olympics.
