= Yurik Sarkisyan =

Soviet weightlifter

Medal record

Men's weightlifting

Representing Soviet Union

Olympic Games
Silver medal – second place	1980 Moscow	-56 kg

World Championships
Gold medal – first place	1982 Ljubljana	-60 kg
Gold medal – first place	1983 Moscow	-60 kg
Silver medal – second place	1980 Moscow	-56 kg
Silver medal – second place	1985 Södertälje	-60 kg
Silver medal – second place	1987 Ostrava	-60 kg
Silver medal – second place	1991 Donaueschingen	-60 kg
Bronze medal – third place	1981 Lille	-60 kg

European Championships
Gold medal – first place	1982 Liubliana	-60 kg
Gold medal – first place	1983 Moscow	-60 kg
Silver medal – second place	1980 Belgrade	-60 kg
Silver medal – second place	1981 Lille	-60 kg
Silver medal – second place	1984 Vitoria	-60 kg
Silver medal – second place	1985 Katowice	-60 kg
Silver medal – second place	1986 Karl-Marx-Stadt	-60 kg
Silver medal – second place	1991 Władysławowo	-60 kg

USSR Weightlifting Championships
Gold medal – first place	1983 Moscow	-60 kg
Gold medal – first place	1984 Minsk	-60 kg
Gold medal – first place	1987 Arkhangelsk	-60 kg
Silver medal – second place	1982 Dnepropetrovsk	-60 kg

Summer Spartakiad of the USSR
Gold medal – first place	1983 Moscow	-60 kg

Cups of the USSR
Gold medal – first place	1979 Frunze	-56 kg Clean and Jerk
Gold medal – first place	1979 Frunze	-56 kg Total
Gold medal – first place	1980 Alma Ata	-60 kg Snatch
Gold medal – first place	1980 Alma Ata	-60 kg Total

Representing Armenia

World Championships
Bronze medal – third place	1993 Melbourne	-60 kg

Representing Australia

Commonwealth Games
Gold medal – first place	2002 Manchester	-62 kg clean & jerk
Gold medal – first place	2002 Manchester	-62 kg snatch
Gold medal – first place	2002 Manchester	-62 kg combined
Silver medal – second place	1998 Kuala Lumpur	-62 kg clean & jerk
Silver medal – second place	1998 Kuala Lumpur	-62 kg snatch
Silver medal – second place	1998 Kuala Lumpur	-62 kg combined

Yurik Sarkisyan (Armenian: Յուրի [Յուրիկ] Սարգսյան, born August 14, 1961, in Samaghar, Armenian SSR) is a former Soviet Armenian weightlifter. He was awarded the Honoured Master of Sports of the USSR title in 1982. In 2007, Yurik Sarkisyan included into the International Weightlifting Federation Hall of Fame weightlifting.

== Early life ==
Yurik Sarkisyan was born in the village of Samagar, Armenian SSR in the Echmiadzin region. He began weight training at the age of 13. In 1980, Sarkisyan was brought into the USSR national weightlifting team. He became a Weightlifting World Champion among juniors the following year.

He trained at VSS Sevan in Echmiadzin.

== Career ==
At the age of 18, Sarkisyan competed at the 1980 Summer Olympics, the same year he joined the Soviet national team. He came in second place in the bantamweight (56 kg) division and won an Olympic silver medal. Following the Olympic Games, Sarkisyan moved up to the featherweight (60 kg) division, where he would compete at for the rest of his career.

In 1982, Sarkisyan cemented his place as the best featherweight weightlifter in the world by winning gold medals at both the 1982 European Weightlifting Championships and 1982 World Weightlifting Championships. Sarkisyan repeated the accomplishment to following year at the 1983 European Weightlifting Championships and 1983 World Weightlifting Championships, making him a consecutive two-time European and World Champion. He had also set several world records at this point. He was a clear gold medal favorite for the 1984 Summer Olympics, but was unable to participate at them because of the 1984 Summer Olympics boycott.

Sarkisyan continued to rank among the top weightlifters in the world for years after the 1984 Olympic Games, but was not included in the USSR weightlifting team at the 1988 Summer Olympics in Seoul. After that, he did not train for a while and thought about the end of his weightlifting career.

In 1991, Sarkisyan continued weightlifting again. He had soon started competing for his native Armenia, which gained its independence from the Soviet Union that same year. Yurik Sarkisyan was named the national team leader for the 1993 World Weightlifting Championships in Melbourne. He became the bronze medalist of the tournament. Afterward, Sarkisyan was invited to stay in Australia by the Australian weightlifting officials and later was offered an Australian citizenship. He signed a contract with the Australian Weightlifting Federation and later competed for Australia. Sarkisyan represented this country at the 1996 Summer Olympics in Atlanta and 2000 Summer Olympics in Sydney, coming in seventh and ninth place, respectively. Sarkisyan also competed at the Commonwealth Games in 1998 and 2002. He won silver in 1998 and, at the age of 41, won the gold medal in 2002.

== Personal life ==
Sarkisyan announced his retirement from his sports career in 2006 and focused on business and coaching. He coached his son David, who, in 2004 and 2008, became the winner of Oceania Championships in the weight classes of lightweight (69 kg) and middleweight (77 kg), respectively. David Sarkisyan was given a two-year international ban from weightlifting competition after testing positive to Testosterone supplementation in an ASADA anti-doping test in 2010.

Sargsyan has been living in Australia since 1994, but often visits Armenia and had intended to return to homeland. However he told SBS news service World News Australia in 2013 that Australia was now his home, and he could not go more than a week away from the country. He celebrated his 50th birthday at Continental restaurant in Yerevan. Friend and former weightlifter Yurik Vardanyan also attended the party. Armenia’s President Serzh Sargsyan and Prosecutor General sent him congratulatory messages and a certificate of honor. In return, Sarkisyan conveyed the Armenian president a coin with his profile, made in Australia.

== Weightlifting achievements ==
- Senior world champion (1982 and 1983);
- Silver medalist in Senior World Championships (1980, 1985, 1987, and 1991);
- Bronze medalist in Senior World Championships (1981 and 1993);
- Senior European champion (1982 and 1983);
- Silver medalist in Senior European Championships (1980, 1981, 1984–1986, and 1991).
