= Oksen Mirzoyan =

Soviet weightlifter

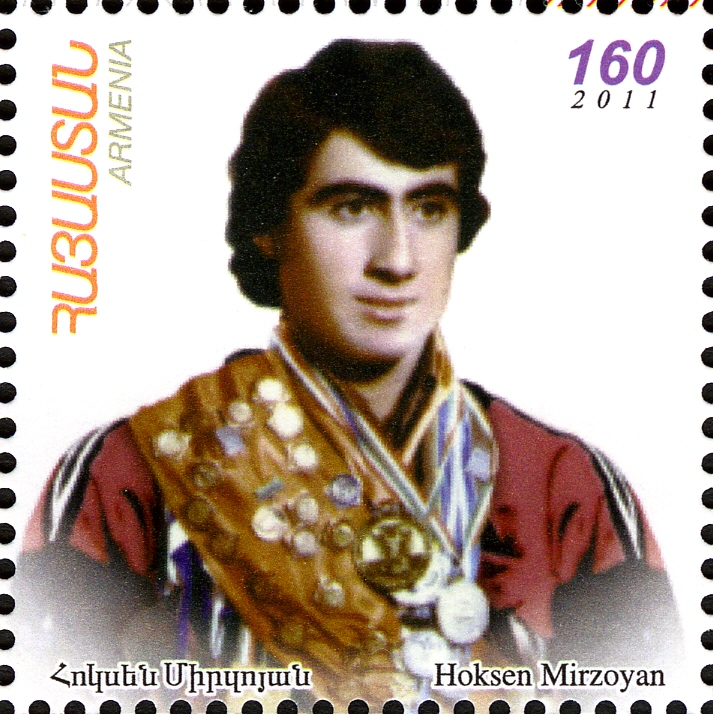

Personal information
- Born: 11 June 1961 (age 65) Angeghakot, Armenian SSR, Soviet Union
- Height: 1.55 m (5 ft 1 in)
- Weight: 56 kg (123 lb)

Sport
- Sport: Weightlifting
- Club: Dynamo Yerevan
Medal record
Representing Soviet Union
Olympic Games
Gold medal – first place	1988 Seoul	-56 kg
World Championships
Silver medal – second place	1982 Ljubljana	-56 kg
Gold medal – first place	1983 Moscow	-56 kg
Silver medal – second place	1985 Södertälje	-56 kg
Bronze medal – third place	1986 Sofia	-56 kg
Bronze medal – third place	1987 Ostrava	-60 kg
European Championships
Silver medal – second place	1982 Liubliana	-56 kg
Gold medal – first place	1983 Moscow	-56 kg
Silver medal – second place	1985 Katowice	-56 kg
Silver medal – second place	1986 Karl-Marx-Stadt	-56 kg
USSR Weightlifting Championships
Gold medal – first place	1982 Dnepropetrovsk	-56 kg
Gold medal – first place	1983 Moscow	-56 kg
Silver medal – second place	1987 Arkhangelsk	-60 kg
Gold medal – first place	1988 Kharkov	-56 kg
Bronze medal – third place	1990 Lipetsk	-56 kg
Gold medal – first place	1991 Donetsk	-56 kg
Summer Spartakiad of the USSR
Gold medal – first place	1983 Moscow	-56 kg
Gold medal – first place	1991 Donetsk	-56 kg
Cups of the USSR
Gold medal – first place	1979 Frunze	-52 kg Snatch
Gold medal – first place	1981 Donetsk	-56 kg Snatch
Gold medal – first place	1981 Donetsk	-56 kg Clean and Jerk
Gold medal – first place	1981 Donetsk	-56 kg Total
Gold medal – first place	1982 Moscow	-56 kg Snatch
Gold medal – first place	1982 Moscow	-56 kg Clean and Jerk
Gold medal – first place	1982 Moscow	-56 kg Total
Gold medal – first place	1985 Leningrad	-56 kg Clean and Jerk
Gold medal – first place	1985 Leningrad	-56 kg Total

Oksen Mirzoyan (Armenian: Օգսեն Միրզոյան, born 11 June 1961) is a former Armenian weightlifter and European, World and Olympic Champion. Mirzoyan was awarded the Honoured Master of Sports of the USSR title in 1984 and the Honored Coach of Armenia title in 1998.

== Biography ==
He was born in the village of Angeghakot, Sisian Oblast, Armenian SSR. In 1965, his family moved to the village Baghramyan, Echmiadzin region. In 1977, he began weight training under the guidance of Ashot Vilasyana. In the following year, he was able to perform with the normal masters of sports of the USSR.

In 1981, Mirzoyan became a member of the USSR national weightlifting team. Mirzoyan became a European and World Champion in 1983 by winning gold medals at the 1983 World Weightlifting Championships and 1983 European Weightlifting Championships, both in Moscow. In the course of both the competitions, Mirzoyan set new world records in the snatch, clean and jerk and the total exercise, all in the bantamweight (56 kg) division. Due to the 1984 Summer Olympics boycott, Mirzoyan was unable to participate that year. As the reigning World Champion, he would have been the favorite to win the Olympic gold medal.

In early 1988, Mirzoyan's rival Neno Terziyski failed a doping test, resulting in a ban from weightlifting. At the 1988 Summer Olympics in Seoul, Mirzoyan came in second place, behind the original first-place winner Mitko Grablev. However, Grablev also tested positive for doping and was disqualified. Thus, the title of Olympic Champion and the Olympic gold medal went on to Oksen Mirzoyan.

Oksen Mirzoyan completed his weightlifting career in 1991 and later took up coaching and sports officiating. He became the head coach of the Armenian national weightlifting team. Mirzoyan was also the Chairman of the Armenian Weightlifting Federation from 1998 to 2004. As of 2004, Mirzoyan is the vice-president of the National Olympic Committee of Armenia and the director of the Yerevan School Sports in weightlifting. Mirzoyan was reelected one of the vice-presidents of the National Olympic Committee of Armenia on 9 March 2013.

== Personal life ==
Mirzoyan coaches his son, European Champion and Vice-World Champion Arakel Mirzoyan, who followed in his father's footsteps and took up weightlifting. Arakel competed at the 2012 Summer Olympics in London for Armenia. Oksen has also coached his nephew, Arayik Mirzoyan, who is also a weightlifter.

== Other weightlifting achievements ==
- Senior world champion (1983);
- Silver medalist in Senior World Championships (1982 & 1985);
- Bronze medalist in Senior World Championships, senior European champion (1983);
- Silver medalist in European Championships (1982, 1985, 1986);
- Set fourteen world records during career.
