= Blagoy Blagoev =

Bulgarian retired weightlifter (born 1956)

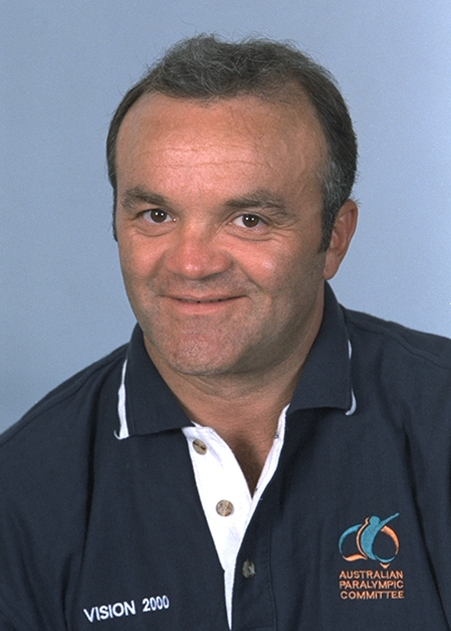
- Blagoev in 2000

Personal information
- Born: 4 December 1956 (age 69)
- Height: 170 cm (5 ft 7 in)

Sport
- Sport: Weightlifting
Medal record
Men's weightlifting
Representing Bulgaria
Olympic Games
Silver medal – second place	1980 Moscow	-82.5 kg
World Championships
Silver medal – second place	1979 Saloniki	-82.5 kg
Silver medal – second place	1980 Moscow	-82.5 kg
Gold medal – first place	1981 Lille	-90 kg
Gold medal – first place	1982 Ljubljana	-90 kg
Gold medal – first place	1983 Moscow	-90 kg
European Championships
Silver medal – second place	1976 East Berlin	-82.5 kg
Gold medal – first place	1979 Varna	-82.5 kg
Gold medal – first place	1981 Lille	-90 kg
Gold medal – first place	1982 Ljubljana	-90 kg
Gold medal – first place	1983 Moscow	-90 kg
Silver medal – second place	1984 Vittoria	-90 kg
IWF World Cup Winner
Gold medal – first place	1982 Halmstad	-90 kg
Gold medal – first place	1983 Tokyo	-90 kg
IWF World Cup Final
Gold medal – first place	1981 Vienna	-90 kg
Gold medal – first place	1982 Halmstad	-90 kg
IWF World Cup
Gold medal – first place	1981 Athens	-90 kg
Gold medal – first place	1982 Atlantic City	-90 kg
Gold medal – first place	1982 Varna	-90 kg
Gold medal – first place	1983 Allentown	-90 kg
Gold medal – first place	1983 Varna	-90 kg
Gold medal – first place	1983 Budapest	-90 kg
Gold medal – first place	1984 Varna	-90 kg
Gold medal – first place	1984 Budapest	-90 kg
Friendship Games
Silver medal – second place	1984 Varna	-90 kg
Junior World Championships
Silver medal – second place	1975 Marseille	-82,5 kg
Junior European Championships
Silver medal – second place	1975 Marseille	-82,5 kg
Bulgarian Championships
Gold medal – first place	1979 Sofia	-82,5 kg
Gold medal – first place	1981 Vidin	-90 kg
Gold medal – first place	1982 Varna	-90 kg
Gold medal – first place	1983 Varna	-90 kg
Gold medal – first place	1984 Varna	-90 kg
Bulgaria Team Championships
Gold medal – first place	1985 Kardzhali	-90 kg
Gold medal – first place	1983 Varna	-100 kg
Gold medal – first place	1982 Varna	-90 kg
Gold medal – first place	1982 Pleven	-100 kg
Gold medal – first place	1981 Varna	-90 kg
Gold medal – first place	1981 Kardzhali	-90 kg
Bulgarian Junior&Youth Championships
Gold medal – first place	1976 Dimitrovgrad	-82,5 kg
Gold medal – first place	1974 Sevlievo	-67,5 kg

Blagoy Blagoev (Bulgarian: Благой Благоев; born 4 December 1956) is a Bulgarian retired weightlifter. Between 1976 and 1984 he claimed seven gold and five silver medals at the Summer Olympics and World and European championships. He set 18 world records. 13 of them were in the snatch. His last snatch world record was 195.5 kg in the 90 kg weight class, set on 1 May 1983 in Varna and remains the heaviest weight ever snatched by a middle heavyweight. Blagoev was twice declared the Best Weightlifter in the World by the International Weightlifting Federation - in 1982 and 1983. Blagoev was named Bulgarian Sportsperson of the Year for 1982. He was also named the BTA Best Balkan Athlete of the Year in 1982.

Blagoev was a two time Olympian. He represented his native country Bulgaria at the Summer Olympics in Montreal (1976) and in Moscow (1980). He won a silver Olympic medal in the light heavyweight 1980 after being stripped of the silver medal in the -82.5 kg competition in 1976 Summer Olympics due to a positive test. Blagoy Blagoev competed in the 82.5 kg and 90 kg weight classes. He was a 3x World Champion (1981, 1982, 1983) in the middle heavyweight. He won 4 gold European medals – as a light heavyweight in 1979 and as a middle heavyweight in 1981-1983. Blagoev also won three consecutive World Cups in Varna, Bulgaria in 1982-1984 and 5 Bulgarian Championships (1979, 1981-1984). He later coached the Australian Paralympic Powerlifting Team in the 1990s to early 2000s.

== Weightlifting achievements ==
- Silver medalist in Olympic Games (1980);
- Senior World champion (1981,1982,1983);
- Silver medalist World Championships 1979,1980
- IWF Weightlifter of the Year 1982 and 1983
- World Cup Winner 1982 and 1983
- Sportsman of the year Bulgaria 1982
- Athlete of the Balkans 1982
- Senior European champion (1979, 1981, 1982 and 1983);
- Silver medalist in Senior European Championships (1976 and 1984);
- All-time senior world record holder in snatch (195.5 kg, competing at 90 kg);
- Best Sinclair lift of all times 195.5 kg in the Snatch at 90 kg bodyweight.
- Set 49 junior and senior ratified world records in 1975–1983.
- Master of Sports (Bulgaria) 1974
- Honored Master of Sports (Bulgaria) 1979
- Honored Coach (Bulgaria) 1987

== Career bests ==
82.5 kg class:

- Snatch 175 1979 Bulgaria, 1980 Moscow
- Clean and Jerk 210 1979 Bulgaria
- Total 385 1979 Bulgaria

90 kg class:

- Snatch: 195.5 kg in 1983 in Varna
- Clean and jerk: 228.5 kg in 1983 in Varna.
- Total: 420.0 kg in 1983 in Varna.
- World Championships Best:

82.5 kg 175+197.5 Moscow 1980, 90 kg 190+227.5 Moscow 1983

- European Championships Best-

82.5 kg 172.5+207.5 Varna 1979, 90 kg 190+227.5 Moscow 1983, 192.5+225 Vittorio, Spain.1984

- World Cup Best

90 kg Halmstad 195+217.5 1982
