= Anton Baraniak =

Slovak weightlifter (born 1951)

Personal information
- Nationality: Slovak
- Born: 20 June 1951 (age 75) Hlohovec, Czechoslovakia

Sport
- Country: Czechoslovakia
- Sport: Weightlifting

Anton Baraniak (born 20 June 1951) is a Slovak former weightlifter. He competed for Czechoslovakia at the 1980 Summer Olympics and the 1988 Summer Olympics.
