= 1984 World Weightlifting Championships =

International weightlifting competition

1984 Men's World Championships
- Host city: Los Angeles, United States
- Dates: 29 July–August-8 August 1984

The 1984 Men's World Weightlifting Championships were held in Los Angeles, United States from July 29 to August 8, 1984. There were 187 men in action from 48 nations.

This tournament was a part of 1984 Summer Olympics but counted as World Weightlifting Championships too. Only total medals counted for Olympic Games while Snatch and Clean & Jerk medals counts for World Weightlifting Championships. The Soviet-led boycott meant that the most dominant forces in weightlifting at the time, the USSR, Bulgaria and East Germany did not take part.

== Medal summary ==
Event	Gold		Silver		Bronze	
52 kg
Snatch	Zhou Peishun; China	107.5 kg	Hidemi Miyashita; Japan	107.5 kg	Zeng Guoqiang; China	105.0 kg
Clean & Jerk	Zeng Guoqiang; China	130.0 kg	Kazushito Manabe; Japan	130.0 kg	Zhou Peishun; China	127.5 kg
Total	Zeng Guoqiang; China	235.0 kg	Zhou Peishun; China	235.0 kg	Kazushito Manabe; Japan	232.5 kg
56 kg
Snatch	Lai Runming; China	125.0 kg	Wu Shude; China	120.0 kg	Masahiro Kotaka; Japan	112.5 kg
Clean & Jerk	Wu Shude; China	147.5 kg	Takashi Ichiba; Japan	140.0 kg	Masahiro Kotaka; Japan	140.0 kg
Total	Wu Shude; China	267.5 kg	Lai Runming; China	265.0 kg	Masahiro Kotaka; Japan	252.5 kg
60 kg
Snatch	Tsai Wen-yee; Chinese Taipei	125.0 kg	Chen Weiqiang; China	125.0 kg	Gelu Radu; Romania	125.0 kg
Clean & Jerk	Chen Weiqiang; China	157.5 kg	Gelu Radu; Romania	155.0 kg	Uolevi Kahelin; Finland	155.0 kg
Total	Chen Weiqiang; China	282.5 kg	Gelu Radu; Romania	280.0 kg	Tsai Wen-yee; Chinese Taipei	272.5 kg
67.5 kg
Snatch	Andrei Socaci; Romania	142.5 kg	Yao Jingyuan; China	142.5 kg	Dean Willey; Great Britain	140.0 kg
Clean & Jerk	Yao Jingyuan; China	177.5 kg	Choji Taira; Japan	172.5 kg	Jouni Grönman; Finland	172.5 kg
Total	Yao Jingyuan; China	320.0 kg	Andrei Socaci; Romania	312.5 kg	Jouni Grönman; Finland	312.5 kg
75 kg
Snatch	Karl-Heinz Radschinsky; West Germany	150.0 kg	Li Shunzhu; China	147.5 kg	Dragomir Cioroslan; Romania	147.5 kg
Clean & Jerk	Karl-Heinz Radschinsky; West Germany	190.0 kg	Jacques Demers; Canada	187.5 kg	Dave Morgan; Great Britain	185.0 kg
Total	Karl-Heinz Radschinsky; West Germany	340.0 kg	Jacques Demers; Canada	335.0 kg	Dragomir Cioroslan; Romania	332.5 kg
82.5 kg
Snatch	Petre Becheru; Romania	155.0 kg	Giuseppe Lagrotteria; Italy	150.0 kg	Ryoji Isaoka; Japan	150.0 kg
Clean & Jerk	Petre Becheru; Romania	200.0 kg	Robert Kabbas; Australia	192.5 kg	Ryoji Isaoka; Japan	190.0 kg
Total	Petre Becheru; Romania	355.0 kg	Robert Kabbas; Australia	342.5 kg	Ryoji Isaoka; Japan	340.0 kg
90 kg
Snatch	Nicu Vlad; Romania	172.5 kg	Petre Dumitru; Romania	165.0 kg	David Mercer; Great Britain	157.5 kg
Clean & Jerk	Nicu Vlad; Romania	220.0 kg	Hwang Woo-won; South Korea	197.5 kg	Petre Dumitru; Romania	195.0 kg
Total	Nicu Vlad; Romania	392.5 kg	Petre Dumitru; Romania	360.0 kg	David Mercer; Great Britain	352.5 kg
100 kg
Snatch	Oliver Orok; Nigeria	172.5 kg	Rolf Milser; West Germany	167.5 kg	Vasile Groapă; Romania	165.0 kg
Clean & Jerk	Vasile Groapă; Romania	217.5 kg	Rolf Milser; West Germany	217.5 kg	Pekka Niemi; Finland	207.5 kg
Total	Rolf Milser; West Germany	385.0 kg	Vasile Groapă; Romania	382.5 kg	Pekka Niemi; Finland	367.5 kg
110 kg
Snatch	Norberto Oberburger; Italy	175.0 kg	Gary Taylor; Great Britain	170.0 kg	Guy Carlton; United States	167.5 kg
Clean & Jerk	Norberto Oberburger; Italy	215.0 kg	Ștefan Tașnadi; Romania	212.5 kg	Guy Carlton; United States	210.0 kg
Total	Norberto Oberburger; Italy	390.0 kg	Ștefan Tașnadi; Romania	380.0 kg	Guy Carlton; United States	377.5 kg
+110 kg
Snatch	Mario Martinez; United States	185.0 kg	Manfred Nerlinger; West Germany	177.5 kg	Dean Lukin; Australia	172.5 kg
Clean & Jerk	Dean Lukin; Australia	240.0 kg	Mario Martinez; United States	225.0 kg	Manfred Nerlinger; West Germany	220.0 kg
Total	Dean Lukin; Australia	412.5 kg	Mario Martinez; United States	410.0 kg	Manfred Nerlinger; West Germany	397.5 kg

== Medal table ==
Ranking by Big (Total result) medals

Rank	Nation	Gold	Silver	Bronze	Total
1	China	4	2	0	6
2	Romania	2	5	1	8
3	West Germany	2	0	1	3
4	Australia	1	1	0	2
5	Italy	1	0	0	1
6	United States	0	1	1	2
7	Canada	0	1	0	1
8	Japan	0	0	3	3
9	Finland	0	0	2	2
10	Chinese Taipei	0	0	1	1
10	Great Britain	0	0	1	1
Totals (11 entries)		10	10	10	30

Ranking by all medals: Big (Total result) and Small (Snatch and Clean & Jerk)

Rank	Nation	Gold	Silver	Bronze	Total
1	China	10	6	2	18
2	Romania	8	8	5	21
3	West Germany	4	3	2	9
4	Italy	3	1	0	4
5	Australia	2	2	1	5
6	United States	1	2	3	6
7	Chinese Taipei	1	0	1	2
8	Nigeria	1	0	0	1
9	Japan	0	4	7	11
10	Canada	0	2	0	2
11	Great Britain	0	1	4	5
12	South Korea	0	1	0	1
13	Finland	0	0	5	5
Totals (13 entries)		30	30	30	90

== See also ==
- Weightlifting at the 1984 Summer Olympics
