= Weightlifting at the 1984 Summer Olympics =

Weightlifting at the Games of the XXIII Olympiad
- Venue: Gersten Pavilion
- Dates: 29 July – 8 August 1984
- Competitors: 186 from 48 nations

The weightlifting competition at the 1984 Summer Olympics in Los Angeles consisted of ten weight classes. The 1984 Summer Olympics boycott meant that the most dominant forces in weightlifting at the time, the USSR and Bulgaria, did not take part. This left the field wide open for others.

== Medal summary ==
Games	Gold	Silver	Bronze
Flyweight –52 kg	Zeng Guoqiang; China	Zhou Peishun; China	Kazushito Manabe; Japan
Bantamweight; 52–56 kg	Wu Shude; China	Lai Runming; China	Masahiro Kotaka; Japan
Featherweight; 56–60 kg	Chen Weiqiang; China	Gelu Radu; Romania	Tsai Wen-yee; Chinese Taipei
Lightweight; 60–67.5 kg	Yao Jingyuan; China	Andrei Socaci; Romania	Jouni Grönman; Finland
Middleweight; 67.5–75 kg	Karl-Heinz Radschinsky; West Germany	Jacques Demers; Canada	Dragomir Cioroslan; Romania
Light-heavyweight; 75–82.5 kg	Petre Becheru; Romania	Robert Kabbas; Australia	Ryoji Isaoka; Japan
Middle-heavyweight; 82.5–90 kg	Nicu Vlad; Romania	Petre Dumitru; Romania	Peter Mercer; Great Britain
First-heavyweight; 90–100 kg	Rolf Milser; West Germany	Vasile Groapa; Romania	Pekka Niemi; Finland
Heavyweight; 100–110 kg	Norberto Oberburger; Italy	Stefan Tasnadi; Romania	Guy Carlton; United States
Super heavyweight +110 kg	Dean Lukin; Australia	Mario Martinez; United States	Manfred Nerlinger; West Germany

== Medal table ==
Rank	Nation	Gold	Silver	Bronze	Total
1	China	4	2	0	6
2	Romania	2	5	1	8
3	West Germany	2	0	1	3
4	Australia	1	1	0	2
5	Italy	1	0	0	1
6	United States	0	1	1	2
7	Canada	0	1	0	1
8	Japan	0	0	3	3
9	Finland	0	0	2	2
10	Chinese Taipei	0	0	1	1
10	Great Britain	0	0	1	1
Totals (11 entries)		10	10	10	30

== See also ==
- Weightlifting at the Friendship Games

== Sources ==
- "Olympic Medal Winners". International Olympic Committee.
