= Weightlifting at the 1982 Commonwealth Games =

- Venue: Chandler Theatre, Sleeman Sports Complex
- Location: Brisbane, Australia
- Dates: 30 September to 9 October 1982

Weightlifting at the 1982 Commonwealth Games was the ninth appearance of Weightlifting at the Commonwealth Games. The events were held in Brisbane, Australia, from 30 September to 9 October 1982 and featured contests in ten weight classes.

The events took place at the Chandler Theatre on the Sleeman Sports Complex.

England topped the weightlifting medal table by virtue of winning four gold medals.

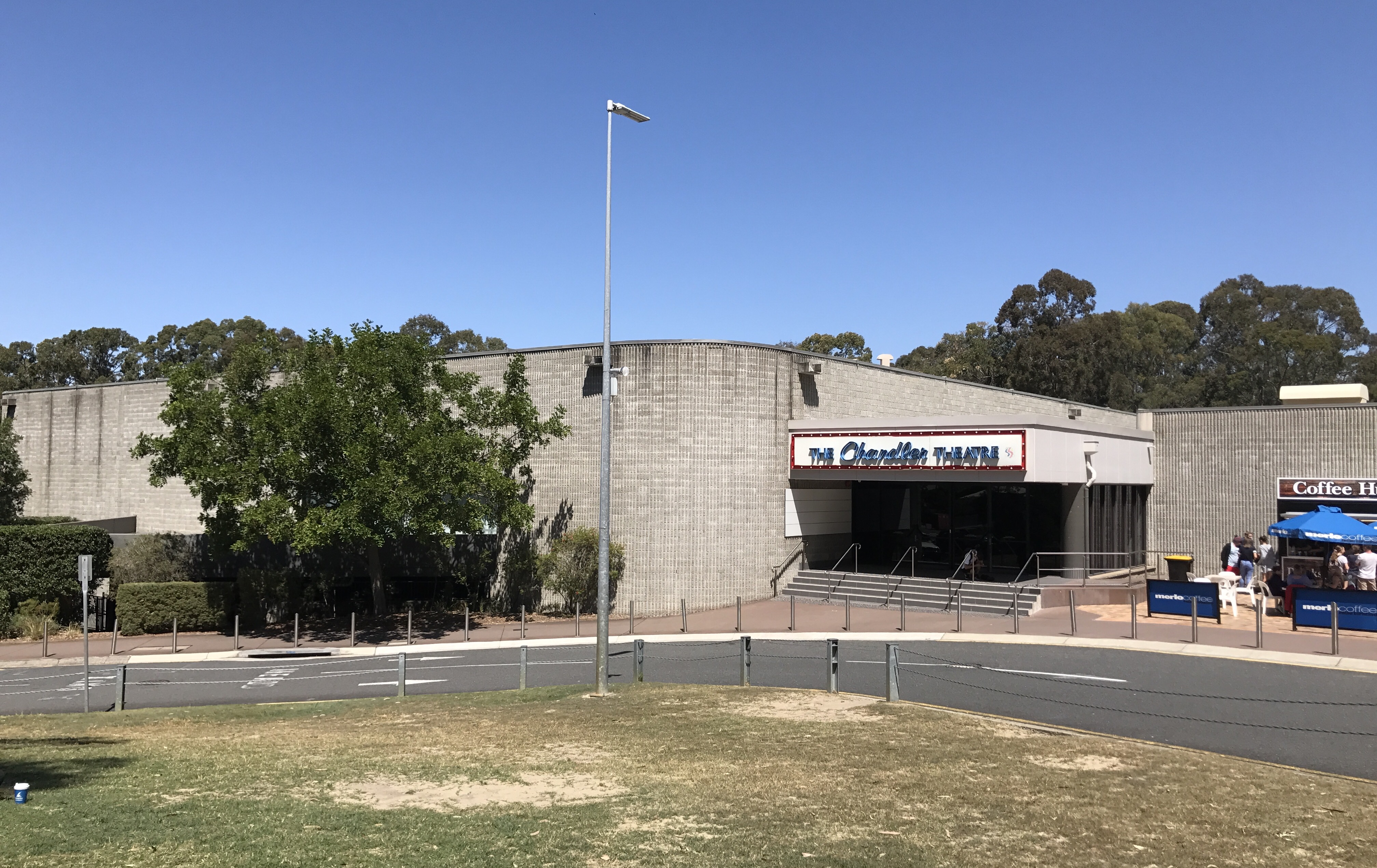
The Chandler Theatre on the Sleeman Complex

== Medal table ==
* Host nation (Australia)

Medals won by nation with totals, ranked by number of golds—sortable
Rank	Nation	Gold	Silver	Bronze	Total
1	England	4	2	0	6
2	Australia*	3	4	2	9
3	Wales	2	0	0	2
4	Nigeria	1	0	4	5
5	India	0	3	0	3
6	Canada	0	1	3	4
7	Singapore	0	0	1	1
Totals (7 entries)		10	10	10	30

== Medal winners ==
Event	Gold	Silver	Bronze
Flyweight 52kg	Nick Voukelatos; Australia	Grunadan Kambiah; India	Lawrence Tom; Nigeria
Bantamweight 56kg	Geoff Laws; England	Bijay Kumar Satpathy; India	Lorenzo Orsini; Australia
Featherweight 60kg	Dean Willey; England	M Tamil Selvan; India	Chua Koon Siang; Singapore
Lightweight 67.5kg	Dave Morgan; Wales	Bill Stellios; Australia	Patrick Bassey; Nigeria
Middleweight 75kg	Steve Pinsent; England	Tony Pignone; Australia	Jacques Demers; Canada
Light Heavyweight 82.5kg	Newton Burrowes; England	Guy Greavette; Canada	Cosmas Idioh; Nigeria
Middle Heavyweight 90kg	Robert Kabbas; Australia	Peter Pinsent; England	Mike Sabljak; Australia
Sub Heavyweight 100kg	Oliver Orok; Nigeria	Gary Langford; England	Kevin Roy; Canada
Heavyweight 110kg	John Burns; Wales	Joe Kabalan; Australia	Mario Leblanc; Canada
Super Heavyweight +100kg	Dean Lukin; Australia	Bob Edmond; Australia	Patrick Bassey; Nigeria

== Results ==
=== Flyweight 52kg ===
Pos	Athlete	Kg
1	Nick Voukelatos (AUS)	207.5
2	Grunadan Kambiah (IND)	200
3	Lawrence Tom (NGR)	192.5
4	Charlie Revolta (SCO)	180.0
-	Ekambaraim Karunakaran (IND)	no total

=== Bantamweight 56kg ===
Pos	Athlete	Kg
1	Geoff Laws (ENG)	235
2	Bijay Kumar Satpathy (IND)	227.5
3	Lorenzo Orsini (AUS)	222.5
4	Vinnaikam Sekar (IND)	222.5
5	John McNiven (SCO)	195.0
-	Ronald Lee (WAL)	No total

=== Featherweight 60kg ===
Pos	Athlete	Kg
1	Dean Willey (ENG)	267.5
2	Muniswamy Tamil Selvan (IND)	245
3	Chua Koon Siang (SIN)	242.5
4	Roderick Gautreau (CAN)	242.5
5	Kevin Judson (NZL)	227.5
6	Jeffrey Bryce (WAL)	215.0
7	Terry McGibbon (NIR)	215.0
-	Raja Gopal Shankaran (IND)	No total

=== Lightweight 67.5kg ===
Pos	Athlete	Kg
1	Dave Morgan (WAL)	295
2	Bill Stellios (AUS)	285
3	Patrick Bassey (NGR)	277.5
4	Michel Pietracupa (CAN)	275.0
5	Alan Winterbourne (ENG)	270.0
6	Jagmohan Sapra (IND)	262.5
7	Terry Williams (NZL)	255.0
8	Robert Michael Shepherd (WAL)	245.0
9	Kamba Kandoa (PNG)	215.0
10	Paul Hoffman (SWZ)	145.0
-	Eric Ross Rogers (CAN)	no total
-	Iwila Jacobs (PNG)	no total

=== Middleweight 75kg ===
Pos	Athlete	Kg
1	Steve Pinsent (ENG)	312.5
2	Tony Pignone (AUS)	305
3	Jacques Demers (CAN)	302.5
4	Leo Isaac (ENG)	300.0
5	Michael Bernard (NZL)	290.0
6	Phillip Sue (NZL)	285.0
7	Emeka Ajei (NGR)	282.5
8	Robert Kennedy (SCO)	270.0
9	Jazeel Mehta (IND)	265.0
10	Absalom Shabangu (SWZ)	195.0
11	Selemani Juma (KEN)	182.5

=== Light Heavyweight 82.5kg ===
Pos	Athlete	Kg
1	Newton Burrowes (ENG)	325
2	Guy Greavette (CAN)	320
3	Cosmas Idioh (NGR)	317.5
4	Michael Keelan (ENG)	315.0
5	Don Coates (NIR)	302.5
6	Allister Nalder (NZL)	297.5
7	Charles Murray (SCO)	280.0
8	Meharchand Bhaskar (IND)	280.0
9	Michael Mexico (PNG)	235.0
10	Constantino Mwebe (KEN)	215.0
11	David Maina (KEN)	187.5
-	Denis Dubreuil (CAN)	no total

=== Middle Heavyweight 90kg ===
Pos	Athlete	Kg
1	Robert Kabbas (AUS)	337.5
2	Peter Pinsent (ENG)	335
3	Mike Sabljak (AUS)	325
4	Albert Squires (CAN)	325.0
5	John Strike (CAN)	317.5
6	John Callaghan (NZL)	317.5
7	Peter Back (NZL)	302.5
8	Paul Easton (WAL)	285.0
9	Pius Ochieng (KEN)	227.5

=== Sub Heavyweight 100kg ===
Pos	Athlete	Kg
1	Oliver Orok (NGR)	350
2	Gary Langford (ENG)	350
3	Kevin Roy (CAN)	340
4	Luigi Fratangelo (AUS)	340.0
5	Alan Locking (WAL)	272.5
-	Gary Taylor (WAL)	no total

=== Heavyweight 110kg ===
Pos	Athlete	Kg
1	John Burns (WAL)	347.5
2	Joe Kabalan (AUS)	325
3	Mario Leblanc (CAN)	315
4	Steven Wilson (WAL)	315

=== Super Heavyweight +110kg ===
Pos	Athlete	Kg
1	Dean Lukin (AUS)	377.5
2	Bob Edmond (AUS)	347.5
3	Patrick Bassey (NGR)	320
4	Naville Daroga (IND)	312.5

== See also ==
- List of Commonwealth Games medallists in weightlifting
