= Weightlifting at the 1983 National Games of China =

1983 weightlifting championship

Weightlifting was part of the 1983 National Games of China held in Shanghai. Only men competed in ten bodyweight categories.

The competition program at the National Games mirrors that of the Olympic Games as only medals for the total achieved are awarded, but not for individual lifts in either the snatch or clean and jerk. Likewise an athlete failing to register a snatch result cannot advance to the clean and jerk.

== Medal summary ==
=== Men ===
Event	Gold		Silver		Bronze	
52 kg	Wang Huanbin; Hunan	242.5 kg	Cai Juncheng; Guangdong	232.5 kg	Tian Zongjun; Shanghai	232.5 kg
56 kg	Wu Shude; Guangxi	275 kg	Lai Runming; PLA	260 kg	Wang Xisheng; Jiangxi	245 kg
60 kg	Chen Weiqiang; Guangdong	285 kg	Zou Zhigang; Beijing	275 kg	Tan Hanyong; Guangxi	272.5 kg
67.5 kg	Yao Jingyuan; Liaoning	317.5 kg	Lin Xiangkui; Fujian	290 kg	Xiao Minglin; Guangxi	287.5 kg
75 kg	Li Shunzhu; Jiangsu	320 kg	Huang Zhentian; Guangdong	305 kg	Lü Jie; Zhejiang	302.5 kg
82.5 kg	Wang Guoxin; Jiangsu	327.5 kg	Yang Zhong; Shandong	300 kg	Wang Yuhai; Hebei	295 kg
90 kg	Ma Wenguang; Shandong	327.5 kg	Cai Yunfa; Shanghai	315 kg	Chan Tingjun; Heilongjiang	315 kg
100 kg	Ma Wenping; Heilongjiang	330 kg	Yang Huaiqing; Shandong	330 kg	Liu Zongyou; Hubei	327.5 kg
110 kg	Guo Weiru; Heilongjiang	340 kg	Tao Hui; PLA	335 kg	Wei Peining; Liaoning	332.5 kg
110+ kg	Meng Naidong; Beijing	350 kg	Wu Huaibing; Anhui	340 kg	Weng Weimin; Shanghai	320 kg

== Medal table ==
Rank	Delegation	Gold	Silver	Bronze	Total
1	Heilongjiang	2	0	1	3
2	Jiangsu	2	0	0	2
3	Guangdong	1	2	0	3
3	Shandong	1	2	0	3
5	Beijing	1	1	0	2
6	Guangxi	1	0	2	3
7	Liaoning	1	0	1	2
8	Hunan	1	0	0	1
9	People's Liberation Army	0	2	0	2
10	Shanghai	0	1	2	3
11	Anhui	0	1	0	1
11	Fujian	0	1	0	1
13	Hebei	0	0	1	1
13	Hubei	0	0	1	1
13	Jiangxi	0	0	1	1
13	Zhejiang	0	0	1	1
Totals (16 entries)		10	10	10	30
