= Weightlifting at the 1984 Summer Olympics – Men's 100 kg =

Weightlifting at the Olympics

Men's 100 kg at the Games of the XXIII Olympiad
- Venue: Albert Gersten Pavilion
- Date: 6 August 1984
- Competitors: 16 from 14 nations
- Winning total: 385.0 kg

Medalists
1st place, gold medalist(s)		Rolf Milser	West Germany
2nd place, silver medalist(s)		Vasile Groapă	Romania
3rd place, bronze medalist(s)		Pekka Niemi	Finland

The men's 100 kg weightlifting competitions at the 1984 Summer Olympics in Los Angeles took place on 6 August at the Albert Gersten Pavilion. It was the second appearance of the heavyweight I class. The weightlifter from West Germany won the gold, with a combined lift of 385 kg.

== Results ==
Rank	Name	Country	kg
1	Rolf Milser	West Germany	385.0
2	Vasile Groapă	Romania	382.5
3	Pekka Niemi	Finland	367.5
4	Kevin Roy	Canada	357.5
5	Ken Clark	United States	352.5
6	Franz Langthaler	Austria	350.0
7	Rich Shanko	United States	350.0
8	Jean-Marie Kretz	France	342.5
9	Kevin Blake	New Zealand	317.5
10	Pius Ochieng	Kenya	300.0
11	Sione Sialaoa	Western Samoa	280.0
AC	Olavi Blomfjord	Sweden	145.0
AC	Peter Pinsent	Great Britain	157.5
AC	Tom Söderholm	Sweden	160.0
AC	Oliver Orok	Nigeria	172.5
AC	Luis Salinas	Nicaragua	DNF
