= Weightlifting at the 1984 Summer Olympics – Men's 56 kg =

Weightlifting at the Olympics

Men's 56 kg at the Games of the XXIII Olympiad
- Venue: Albert Gersten Pavilion
- Date: 30 July 1984
- Competitors: 20 from 18 nations

Medalists
1st place, gold medalist(s)		Wu Shude	China
2nd place, silver medalist(s)		Lai Runming	China
3rd place, bronze medalist(s)		Masahiro Kotaka	Japan

The Men's Bantamweight Weightlifting Event (– 56 kg) was the second lightest event at the weightlifting competition. Each weightlifter had three attempts for both the snatch and clean and jerk lifting methods. The total of the best successful lift of each method was used to determine the final rankings and medal winners. Competition took place on 30 July in the 4,500 capacity Albert Gersten Pavilion. The weightlifter from China won the gold, with a combined lift of 267.5 kg.

== Results ==
Rank	Athlete	Group	Body weight	Snatch (kg)				Clean & Jerk (kg)				Total (kg)
Rank	Athlete	Group	Body weight	1	2	3	Result	1	2	3	Result	Total (kg)
1st place, gold medalist(s)	Wu Shude (CHN)	A	55.70	120.0	~~125.0~~	~~125.0~~	120.0	140.0	145.0	147.5	147.5	267.5
2nd place, silver medalist(s)	Lai Runming (CHN)	A	55.60	115.0	120.0	125.0	125.0	140.0	~~145.0~~	~~145.0~~	140.0	265.0
3rd place, bronze medalist(s)	Masahiro Kotaka (JPN)	A	55.35	112.5	~~117.5~~	~~117.5~~	112.5	~~140.0~~	140.0	~~145.0~~	140.0	252.5
4	Takashi Ichiba (JPN)	A	55.30	~~110.0~~	110.0	~~115.0~~	110.0	140.0	~~145.0~~	~~145.0~~	140.0	250.0
5	Kim Chil-bong (KOR)	A	55.75	100.0	105.0	~~107.5~~	105.0	132.5	137.5	140.0	140.0	245.0
6	Dionisio Muñoz (ESP)	A	55.35	105.0	~~110.0~~	110.0	110.0	127.5	132.5	~~135.0~~	132.5	242.5
7	Arvo Ojalehto (FIN)	B	55.65	105.0	~~110.0~~	~~110.0~~	105.0	~~137.5~~	~~137.5~~	137.5	137.5	242.5
8	Albert Hood (USA)	A	55.90	105.0	110.0	112.5	112.5	130.0	~~137.5~~	~~137.5~~	130.0	242.5
9	Ioannis Katsaidonis (GRE)	B	55.25	100.0	105.0	~~107.5~~	105.0	130.0	135.0	~~137.5~~	135.0	240.0
10	Deven Govindasami (IND)	B	55.70	100.0	105.0	~~107.5~~	105.0	130.0	~~135.0~~	~~135.0~~	130.0	235.0
11	Chiu Yuh-chuan (TPE)	A	55.85	97.5	~~102.5~~	~~102.5~~	97.5	132.5	~~137.5~~	~~137.5~~	132.5	230.0
12	Nicolas Mercado (COL)	B	55.85	100.0	~~105.0~~	~~105.0~~	100.0	125.0	130.0	~~132.5~~	130.0	230.0
13	Mohamed El-Sayed Ramadan (EGY)	B	55.90	97.5	~~102.5~~	~~102.5~~	97.5	132.5	~~137.5~~	~~140.0~~	132.5	230.0
14	Jagadish Pradhan (NEP)	B	55.85	87.5	92.5	~~97.5~~	92.5	110.0	~~117.5~~	117.5	117.5	210.0
15	Nery Minchez (GUA)	B	55.60	85.0	~~90.0~~	~~90.0~~	85.0	112.5	117.5	~~120.0~~	117.5	202.5
-	Taoufik Maaouia (TUN)	B	55.75	~~90.0~~	~~95.0~~	~~95.0~~	—	125.0	~~130.0~~	~~130.0~~	125.0	—
-	Gheorghe Maftei (ROU)	A	55.65	110.0	~~115.0~~	~~115.0~~	110.0	~~145.0~~	~~145.0~~	~~145.0~~	—	—
-	Mehmet Altin (TUR)	B	55.75	97.5	102.5	~~105.0~~	102.5	~~130.0~~	AB	AB	—	—
-	Hadi Wihardja (INA)	A	55.60	~~105.0~~	~~105.0~~	~~105.0~~	—	~~142.5~~	~~142.5~~	~~142.5~~	—	—
-	Ahmed Tarbi (ALG)	B	55.95	102.5	107.5	110.0	DQ	132.5	~~137.5~~	~~137.5~~	DQ	DQ

== Sources ==
- 1984 Summer Olympics Official Report (PDF). IOC. 1984. p. 612. Archived from the original (PDF) on 17 October 2013.
