= Weightlifting at the 1984 Summer Olympics – Men's 60 kg =

Weightlifting at the Olympics

Men's 60 kg at the Games of the XXIII Olympiad
- Venue: Albert Gersten Pavilion
- Date: 31 July 1984
- Competitors: 21 from 17 nations

Medalists
1st place, gold medalist(s)		Chen Weiqiang	China
2nd place, silver medalist(s)		Gelu Radu	Romania
3rd place, bronze medalist(s)		Tsai Wen-Yee	Chinese Taipei

The Men's Featherweight Weightlifting Event (–60 kg) was the third lightest event at the weightlifting competition. Each weightlifter had three attempts for both the snatch and clean and jerk lifting methods. The total of the best successful lift of each method was used to determine the final rankings and medal winners. Competition took place on 31 July in the 4,500 capacity Albert Gersten Pavilion. The weightlifter from China won the gold, with a combined lift of 282.5 kg.

== Results ==
Rank	Athlete	Group	Body weight	Snatch (kg)				Clean & Jerk (kg)				Total (kg)
Rank	Athlete	Group	Body weight	1	2	3	Result	1	2	3	Result	Total (kg)
1st place, gold medalist(s)	Chen Weiqiang (CHN)	A	59.40	120.0	~~125.0~~	125.0	125.0	157.5	~~165.0~~	~~165.0~~	157.5	282.5
2nd place, silver medalist(s)	Gelu Radu (ROU)	A	59.85	120.0	125.0	~~127.5~~	125.0	155.0	~~165.0~~	~~165.0~~	155.0	280.0
3rd place, bronze medalist(s)	Tsai Wen-Yee (TPE)	A	59.20	120.0	125.0	~~127.5~~	125.0	147.5	~~152.5~~	~~152.5~~	147.5	272.5
4	Kaoru Wabiko (JPN)	A	59.40	115.0	120.0	~~122.5~~	120.0	~~150.0~~	150.0	~~155.0~~	150.0	270.0
5	Yosuke Muraki-Iwata (JPN)	A	59.50	120.0	~~125.0~~	~~125.0~~	120.0	147.5	~~152.5~~	~~155.0~~	147.5	267.5
6	Lee Myeong-su (KOR)	B	59.70	~~117.5~~	117.5	~~122.5~~	117.5	150.0	~~155.0~~	~~155.0~~	150.0	267.5
7	Sorie Enda Nasution (INA)	B	59.90	115.0	~~120.0~~	~~120.0~~	115.0	145.0	152.5	~~155.0~~	152.5	267.5
8	Uolevi Kahelin (FIN)	A	59.90	112.5	~~117.5~~	~~117.5~~	112.5	142.5	150.0	155.0	155.0	267.5
9	Mircea Tuli (ROU)	A	59.75	115.0	~~120.0~~	~~120.0~~	115.0	~~150.0~~	150.0	~~160.0~~	150.0	265.0
10	Mohamed Youssef (EGY)	B	59.85	105.0	~~110.0~~	~~110.0~~	105.0	140.0	~~145.0~~	147.5	147.5	252.5
11	Tómas Rodríguez (PAN)	B	59.60	110.0	115.0	~~117.5~~	115.0	130.0	135.0	~~140.0~~	135.0	250.0
12	Geoffrey Laws (GBR)	B	59.60	107.5	112.5	~~115.0~~	112.5	137.5	~~142.5~~	~~142.5~~	137.5	250.0
13	Oscar Palma (COL)	B	59.80	105.0	110.0	~~112.5~~	110.0	135.0	~~140.0~~	~~140.0~~	135.0	245.0
14	Lawrence Iquaibom (NGR)	B	59.30	100.0	~~107.5~~	107.5	107.5	122.5	130.0	~~137.5~~	130.0	237.5
15	Kamalakanta Santra (IND)	B	58.90	95.0	~~100.0~~	~~100.0~~	95.0	125.0	~~130.0~~	130.0	130.0	225.0
16	Héctor Hurtado (ECU)	B	59.80	90.0	~~95.0~~	95.0	95.0	120.0	~~125.0~~	125.0	125.0	220.0
17	Alfredo Palma (NCA)	B	58.20	90.0	~~95.0~~	~~95.0~~	90.0	~~120.0~~	120.0	~~125.0~~	120.0	210.0
-	Joaquín Valle (ESP)	A	59.35	110.0	~~115.0~~	~~115.0~~	110.0	~~140.0~~	~~140.0~~	~~140.0~~	—	—
-	Noureddine Bekkouche (ALG)	B	59.25	~~105.0~~	~~105.0~~	~~105.0~~	—	132.5	137.5	~~142.5~~	137.5	—
-	Wang Guofeng (CHN)	A	59.35	~~117.5~~	117.5	~~122.5~~	117.5	~~147.5~~	~~147.5~~	~~147.5~~	—	—
-	Ji Ju-hyeon (KOR)	B	59.90	~~110.0~~	~~110.0~~	~~110.0~~	—	—	—	—	—	—

== Sources ==
- 1984 Summer Olympics Official Report (PDF). IOC. 1984. pp. 612–613. Archived from the original (PDF) on 17 October 2013.
