= Weightlifting at the 1988 Summer Olympics – Men's 67.5 kg =

Weightlifting at the Olympics

Men's 67.5 kg at the Games of the XXIV Olympiad
- Venue: Olympic Weightlifting Gymnasium
- Date: 21 September 1988
- Competitors: 30 from 25 nations

Medalists
1st place, gold medalist(s)		Joachim Kunz	East Germany
2nd place, silver medalist(s)		Israel Militosyan	Soviet Union
3rd place, bronze medalist(s)		Li Jinhe	China

The men's 67.5 kg weightlifting event was one of the events at the weightlifting competition of the 1988 Summer Olympics, limiting competitors to a maximum of 67.5 kilograms of body mass. The competition took place on 20 September, and participants were divided in two groups.

Each lifter performed in both the snatch and clean and jerk lifts, with the final score being the sum of the lifter's best result in each. The athlete received three attempts in each of the two lifts; the score for the lift was the heaviest weight successfully lifted.

Angel Genchev originally won this category but he was disqualified after he tested positive for furosemide.

== Results ==
Rank	Athlete	Group	Body weight	Snatch (kg)				Clean & Jerk (kg)				Total
Rank	Athlete	Group	Body weight	1	2	3	Result	1	2	3	Result	Total
1st place, gold medalist(s)	Joachim Kunz (GDR)	A	67.20	142.5	147.5	150.0	150.0	180.0	~~190.0~~	190.0	190.0	340.0
2nd place, silver medalist(s)	Israel Militosyan (URS)	A	67.10	155.0	~~160.0~~	~~160.0~~	155.0	182.5	~~187.5~~	~~187.5~~	182.5	337.5
3rd place, bronze medalist(s)	Li Jinhe (CHN)	A	67.20	142.5	147.5	~~150.0~~	147.5	177.5	~~182.5~~	~~182.5~~	177.5	325.0
4	Marek Seweryn (POL)	A	66.80	140.0	~~145.0~~	145.0	145.0	~~172.5~~	~~172.5~~	172.5	172.5	317.5
5	Ergun Batmaz (TUR)	C	67.45	~~140.0~~	140.0	145.0	145.0	165.0	172.5	~~175.0~~	172.5	317.5
6	Xiao Minglin (CHN)	A	66.45	132.5	~~137.5~~	~~137.5~~	132.5	172.5	~~177.5~~	~~177.5~~	172.5	305.0
7	István Kerek (HUN)	A	66.75	132.5	~~140.0~~	~~140.0~~	132.5	170.0	~~175.0~~	~~175.0~~	170.0	302.5
8	Christos Constandinidis (GRE)	B	67.20	~~132.5~~	132.5	137.5	137.5	~~162.5~~	162.5	~~167.5~~	162.5	300.0
9	Choji Taira (JPN)	B	67.05	122.5	127.5	~~130.0~~	127.5	165.0	170.0	~~172.5~~	170.0	297.5
10	Langis Côté (CAN)	B	67.15	132.5	137.5	~~140.0~~	137.5	160.0	~~165.0~~	~~165.0~~	160.0	297.5
11	Reijo Kiiskilä (FIN)	B	67.40	130.0	~~135.0~~	135.0	135.0	~~162.5~~	162.5	~~167.5~~	162.5	297.5
12	Lawrence Iquaibom (NGR)	B	67.10	~~125.0~~	125.0	~~130.0~~	125.0	150.0	155.0	160.0	160.0	285.0
13	Michael Jacques (USA)	C	67.35	~~120.0~~	120.0	125.0	125.0	150.0	~~157.5~~	157.5	157.5	282.5
14	Paulo Duarte (POR)	C	67.35	120.0	125.0	~~127.5~~	125.0	150.0	~~155.0~~	~~155.0~~	150.0	275.0
15	Tomas Rodriguez (PAN)	C	67.25	117.5	~~122.5~~	~~122.5~~	117.5	145.0	~~150.0~~	~~150.0~~	145.0	262.5
16	Kim Gi-ung (KOR)	B	66.95	~~130.0~~	130.0	~~135.0~~	130.0	130.0	—	—	130.0	260.0
17	Edvaldo Santos (BRA)	B	67.35	110.0	115.0	120.0	120.0	~~140.0~~	140.0	~~150.0~~	140.0	260.0
18	Taveuni Ofisa (SAM)	C	67.20	100.0	107.5	~~112.5~~	107.5	~~142.5~~	~~142.5~~	142.5	142.5	250.0
19	Pinye Malaibi (PNG)	C	66.95	90.0	102.5	105.0	105.0	115.0	~~125.0~~	125.0	125.0	230.0
20	Mohamadamine Alaywan (LIB)	C	66.65	90.0	95.0	~~100.0~~	95.0	115.0	~~120.0~~	122.5	122.5	217.5
21	Joseph Kaddu Kutfesa (UGA)	C	65.15	90.0	~~92.5~~	—	90.0	120.0	125.0	~~127.5~~	125.0	215.0
22	Pete Fejeran (GUM)	C	67.40	82.5	~~87.5~~	~~87.5~~	82.5	105.0	110.0	~~115.0~~	110.0	192.5
—	Chang Shun-chien (TPE)	C	66.15	125.0	132.5	~~135.0~~	132.5	—	—	—	—	—
—	Paolo Casadei (SMR)	C	67.20	~~107.5~~	~~107.5~~	~~107.5~~	—	—	—	—	—	—
—	Jouni Grönman (FIN)	A	67.20	~~140.0~~	~~140.0~~	~~140.0~~	—	—	—	—	—	—
—	Park Tae-min (KOR)	A	67.20	~~132.5~~	~~132.5~~	~~132.5~~	—	—	—	—	—	—
—	Yasushige Sasaki (JPN)	B	67.25	~~130.0~~	~~130.0~~	~~130.0~~	—	—	—	—	—	—
—	Fernando Mariaca (ESP)	B	66.80	127.5	~~132.5~~	~~132.5~~	DQ	160.0	~~165.0~~	~~165.0~~	DQ	DQ
—	Angel Guenchev (BUL)	A	67.35	150.0	157.5	160.0	DQ	190.0	197.5	202.5	DQ	DQ

== Sources ==
- The Official Report of the Games of the XXIV Olympiad Seoul 1988 Volume Two (PDF). p. 643.
