= Weightlifting at the 1984 Summer Olympics – Men's 75 kg =

Weightlifting at the Olympics

Men's 75 kg at the Games of the XXIII Olympiad
- Venue: Albert Gersten Pavilion
- Date: 2 August 1984
- Competitors: 21 from 17 nations

Medalists
1st place, gold medalist(s)		Karl-Heinz Radschinsky	West Germany
2nd place, silver medalist(s)		Jacques Demers	Canada
3rd place, bronze medalist(s)		Dragomir Cioroslan	Romania

The Men's Middleweight Weightlifting Event (–75 kg) was the fifth lightest event at the weightlifting competition. Each weightlifter had three attempts for both the snatch and clean and jerk lifting methods. The total of the best successful lift of each method was used to determine the final rankings and medal winners. Competition took place on 2 August in the 4,500 capacity Albert Gersten Pavilion. The weightlifter from West Germany won the gold, with a combined lift of 340 kg.

== Results ==
Rank	Athlete	Group	Body weight	Snatch (kg)				Clean & Jerk (kg)				Total (kg)
Rank	Athlete	Group	Body weight	1	2	3	Result	1	2	3	Result	Total (kg)
1st place, gold medalist(s)	Karl-Heinz Radschinsky (FRG)	A	74.30	145.0	150.0	~~152.5~~	150.0	190.0	~~202.5~~	~~202.5~~	190.0	340.0
2nd place, silver medalist(s)	Jacques Demers (CAN)	A	74.85	~~140.0~~	140.0	147.5	147.5	~~182.5~~	182.5	187.5	187.5	335.0
3rd place, bronze medalist(s)	Dragomir Cioroslan (ROU)	A	74.50	~~147.5~~	147.5	~~152.5~~	147.5	185.0	~~190.0~~	~~190.0~~	185.0	332.5
4	David Morgan (GBR)	A	74.05	145.0	~~150.0~~	~~150.0~~	145.0	~~180.0~~	180.	185.0	185.0	330.0
5	Li Shunzhu (CHN)	A	74.45	140.0	145.0	147.5	147.5	175.0	~~180.0~~	~~180.0~~	175.0	322.5
6	Mohammed Yaseen Mohammed (IRQ)	A	73.90	140.0	~~145.0~~	~~145.0~~	140.0	180.0	~~185.0~~	~~185.0~~	180.0	320.0
7	Tony Pignone (AUS)	B	74.90	140.0	145.0	147.5	147.5	170.0	~~175.0~~	~~175.0~~	170.0	317.5
8	Park Chun-jong (KOR)	B	74.90	132.5	137.5	~~140.0~~	137.5	170.0	175.0	~~177.5~~	175.0	312.5
9	Michel Pietracupa (CAN)	B	74.60	135.0	~~140.0~~	~~140.0~~	135.0	170.0	175.0	~~182.5~~	175.0	310.0
10	Daniel Cassiau-Haurie (FRA)	A	73.10	~~137.5~~	137.5	~~142.5~~	137.5	170.0	~~175.0~~	~~175.0~~	170.0	307.5
11	Stephan Pinsent (GBR)	A	74.95	~~137.5~~	137.5	~~142.5~~	137.5	170.0	~~175.0~~	~~175.0~~	170.0	307.5
12	Pavlo Lespouridis (GRE)	A	74.05	~~135.0~~	135.0	~~140.0~~	135.0	170.0	~~175.0~~	~~175.0~~	170.0	305.0
13	Iordanis Ilioudis (GRE)	B	74.80	125.0	130.0	~~132.5~~	130.0	170.0	~~175.0~~	175.0	175.0	305.0
14	Gilberto Mercado (COL)	B	74.30	~~135.0~~	135.0	~~140.0~~	135.0	160.0	165.0	167.5	167.5	302.5
15	Ahmed Fouad Aly (EGY)	B	73.60	125.0	130.0	~~132.5~~	130.0	160.0	~~165.0~~	~~165.0~~	160.0	290.0
16	Park Yeong-jae (KOR)	B	74.80	125.0	~~130.0~~	130.0	130.0	~~160.0~~	160.0	~~165.0~~	160.0	290.0
17	William Letriz (PUR)	B	74.75	122.5	~~130.0~~	130.0	130.0	145.0	152.5	~~157.5~~	152.5	282.5
18	Fred Bunjo (UGA)	B	74.75	100.0	105.0	~~110.0~~	105.0	130.0	135.0	140.0	140.0	245.0
19	Paul Hoffman (SWZ)	B	72.10	67.5	72.5	~~77.5~~	72.5	97.5	102.5	~~105.0~~	102.5	175.0
-	Hasan Has (TUR)	B	74.60	142.5	147.5	~~152.5~~	147.5	~~167.5~~	~~167.5~~	~~167.5~~	0.0	0.0
-	Roman Kainz (AUT)	B	74.50	~~137.5~~	137.5	~~142.5~~	137.5	~~172.5~~	~~172.5~~	—	—	—

== Sources ==
- 1984 Summer Olympics Official Report (PDF). IOC. 1984. p. 613. Archived from the original (PDF) on 17 October 2013.
