= Weightlifting at the 1984 Summer Olympics – Men's 90 kg =

Weightlifting at the Olympics

Men's 90 kg at the Games of the XXIII Olympiad
- Venue: Albert Gersten Pavilion
- Date: 5 August 1984
- Competitors: 26 from 20 nations
- Winning total: 392.5 kg OR

Medalists
1st place, gold medalist(s)		Nicu Vlad	Romania
2nd place, silver medalist(s)		Petre Dumitru	Romania
3rd place, bronze medalist(s)		David Mercer	Great Britain

The men's 90 kg weightlifting competitions at the 1984 Summer Olympics in Los Angeles took place on 5 August at the Albert Gersten Pavilion. It was the ninth appearance of the middle heavyweight class. The weightlifter from Romania won the gold, with a combined lift of 392.5 kg.

== Results ==
Rank	Name	Country	kg
1	Nicu Vlad	Romania	392.5
2	Petre Dumitru	Romania	360.0
3	David Mercer	Great Britain	352.5
4	Peter Immesberger	West Germany	350.0
5	Hwang U-won	South Korea	350.0
6	Nikos Iliadis	Greece	350.0
7	Henri Høeg	Denmark	347.5
8	José Garces	Mexico	342.5
9	Josef Span	Austria	342.5
10	Keith Boxell	Great Britain	342.5
11	Ma Wenguang	China	340.0
12	Denis Garon	Canada	340.0
13	Francisco Coelho	Portugal	340.0
14	Daniel Tschan	Switzerland	337.5
15	Maged Mohamed	Egypt	332.5
16	Emmanuel Oshomah	Nigeria	327.5
17	Mohammed Taher Mohammed	Iraq	325.0
18	Klaus-Göran Nilsson	Sweden	317.5
19	Tommy Calandro	United States	315.0
20	Salem Ajjoub	Syria	315.0
21	Jaime Molina	Peru	282.5
22	Emila Huch	Samoa	270.0
AC	Ibrahim Shaban	Egypt	145
AC	Erich Seidl	Austria	150
AC	Kim Cheol-hyeon	South Korea	150
AC	Derrick Crass	United States	DNF
