= Ichiba =

Ichiba (市場) is a Japanese word which means "market". Ichiba may also refer to the following:

== People ==
- Takashi Ichiba (born 1960), Japanese weightlifter
- Yasuhiro Ichiba (一場 靖弘, born 1982), Japanese Baseball pitcher

== Place ==
- Ichiba Station (disambiguation), name of several train stations
- Ichiba, Tokushima was a town located in Awa District, Japan.
