= Guofeng (disambiguation) =

Hua Guofeng (Chinese: 华国锋) was leader of the People's Republic of China from 1976 to 1978.

Guofeng could also refer to:

- Wang Guofeng (born 1963), Chinese weightlifter
- Zhang Guofeng (Chinese: 张国锋; born 1989), Chinese football midfielder
