= Weightlifting at the 1984 Summer Olympics – Men's 110 kg =

Weightlifting at the Olympics

Men's 110 kg at the Games of the XXIII Olympiad
- Venue: Albert Gersten Pavilion
- Date: 7 August 1984
- Competitors: 15 from 12 nations
- Winning total: 390.0 kg

Medalists
1st place, gold medalist(s)		Norberto Oberburger	Italy
2nd place, silver medalist(s)		Ștefan Tașnadi	Romania
3rd place, bronze medalist(s)		Guy Carlton	United States

The men's 110 kg weightlifting competitions at the 1984 Summer Olympics in Los Angeles took place on 7 August at the Albert Gersten Pavilion. It was the fifteenth appearance of the heavyweight II class. The weightlifter from Italy won the gold, with a combined lift of 390 kg.

== Results ==
Rank	Name	Country	kg
1	Norberto Oberburger	Italy	390.0
2	Ștefan Tașnadi	Romania	380.0
3	Guy Carlton	United States	377.5
4	Frank Seipelt	West Germany	367.5
5	Albert Squires	Canada	365.0
6	Ric Eaton	United States	352.5
7	Giannis Gerontas	Greece	350.0
8	Olaf Peters	West Germany	347.5
9	Calvin Stamp	Jamaica	330.0
10	Abuaihuda Ozon	Syria	315.0
AC	John Kyazze	Uganda	120.0
AC	Georgios Panagiotakis	Greece	160.0
AC	Gary Taylor	Great Britain	170.0
AC	Ashraf Mohamed	Egypt	190.0
AC	Göran Pettersson	Sweden	360.0 (DQ)
