= Western Samoa at the 1984 Summer Olympics =

- IOC code: WSM
- NOC: Samoa Association of Sports and National Olympic Committee Inc.

in Los Angeles
- Competitors: 8
- Flag bearer: Apelu Ioane
- Medals: Gold 0 Silver 0 Bronze 0 Total 0

Summer Olympics appearances (overview)
- 1896; 1900; 1904; 1908; 1912; 1920; 1924; 1928; 1932; 1936; 1948; 1952; 1956; 1960; 1964; 1968; 1972; 1976; 1980; 1984; 1988; 1992; 1996; 2000; 2004; 2008; 2012; 2016; 2020; 2024

Western Samoa competed in the Olympic Games for the first time at the 1984 Summer Olympics in Los Angeles, United States.

== Results by event ==
=== Athletics ===
Men's Shot Put

- Henry Smith

- Qualifying Round — 16.09 m (→ did not advance, 19th place)

Men's Discus

- Henry Smith

- Qualifying Round — 51.90 m (→ did not advance, 17th place)

=== Weightlifting ===
Men's 90 kg class

- Emile Huch

- Snatch — 117.5kg (25th place)
- C&J — 152.5kg (21st place)
- Total — 260.0kg (22nd place)

Men's 100 kg class

- Sione Sialaoa

- Snatch — 125.0kg (14th place)
- C&J — 155.0kg (11th place)
- Total — 270.0kg (11th place)
