= Chang Shun-chien =

Taiwanese weightlifter

Personal information
- Native name: 張順堅
- Nationality: Taiwanese
- Born: 13 June 1962 (age 62)

Sport
- Sport: Weightlifting

Chang Shun-chien (traditional Chinese: 張順堅; simplified Chinese: 张顺坚; born 13 June 1962) is a Taiwanese weightlifter. He competed in the men's lightweight event at the 1988 Summer Olympics.

== Biography ==
Chang's father is Chang Qing-lu (Chinese: 張慶祿). Chen grew up on the hillside of Changhua County's Bagua Plateau. When he returned home from school, for over 10 minutes, he would use both hands to lug his bicycle up the slope. Min Sheng Bao sports journalist Chen Li-qing said this allowed him to develop exceptional waist strength. Chang attended Deming Vocational High School (Chinese: 德明商工), where he was in his third year when he became a member of the new weightlifting team two months before his graduation. When he was 19 years old, he began weightlifting at Yuanlin Heavyweight Gym (Chinese: 員林重量級健身院), where he was coached by Huang Ming-tang (Chinese: 黃銘艟). His first weightlifting competition was in the Bao Sheng Da Di Cup (Chinese: 保生大帝杯), where he finished in 6th place after lifting 85 kg (187 lb) in the snatch and 112.5 kg (248 lb) in the clean and jerk.

Chang was a resident of Ershui in Changhua County in 1985. After graduating from the Taichung Provincial Physical Education College (Chinese: 台中省體專) in the summer of 1985, he requested to defer his military service until November 1985 so that he could do Olympic Games training in Kaohsiung's Zuoying District. The Olympian Tsai Wen-yee was his coach in Zuoying. Chang was 161 cm (5 ft 3 in) and 64 kg (141 lb) when he competed in weightlifting in the third weight class at the National Games of Taiwan held in Changhua County in 1985. In the snatch, he lifted 123 kg (271 lb), which broke the previous national record of 122.5 kg (270 lb) set by Tsai, his coach. It was the inaugural time that he set a national record. He lifted 140 kg (310 lb) in the clean and jerk and received three gold medals at the National Games. After his performance at the National Games, the United Daily News sports journalist Gong Tai-shun wrote that Chang "has been hailed as the potential successor to 'Tsai the Bronze Medal' and could surpass Tsai in terms of development potential".

In 1985, the Chinese Taipei Weightlifting Association (Chinese: 中華民國舉重協會) chose Chang to represent Taiwan in the 1986 Asian Games. Chang competed in the National Zhongzheng Cup Chinese: 全國中正杯) on 11 October 1986 where he lifted 154 kg (340 lb) in the clean and jerk event where he broke the national record. In the snatch event, he lifted 126 kg (278 lb), which set a second national record. In total, Chang lifted 275 kg (606 lb), which broke another national record. Chang competed on 27 October 1986 in the fourth weight class at the Regional Weightlifting Competition (Chinese: 區運舉重賽), where he lifted 127.5 kg (281 lb) in the snatch event, which set a national record. In the clean and jerk event, he lifted 155 kg (342 lb) which set another national record. Chang earned NT$300,000 (US$10,740) in prize money at the competition and won three gold medals.

At the Taipei Zhongzheng Centennial Cup (Chinese: 台北市中正百年紀念杯) in December 1986, Chang set national records in snatch through lifting 130 kg (290 lb), in clean and jerk through lifting 155.5 kg (343 lb), and in total weight through lifting 285.5 kg (629 lb). During the selection for the Asian Weightlifting Championships held on 22 January 1987, Chang competed in the 67.5 kg (149 lb) category. He earned NT$10,000 (US$358) after lifting 156 kg (344 lb) in the clean and jerk which broke the national record of 155.5 kg (343 lb) he had previously set. Chang competed at the Melbourne Weightlifting Invitational Tournament (Chinese: 墨爾缽舉重邀請賽) in March 1987 but was unable to successfully lift in both the snatch and the clean and jerk events. Min Sheng Bao sports journalist He Chang-fa wrote in March 1987 that Chang's "weightlifting prowess truly emerged" in October the previous year, noting that in five competitions Chang had broken 10 national records. According to He Chang-fa, the Olympian bronze medalist Tsai Wen-yee was unbeaten in Taiwan until Chang began competing. In the National Youth Cup Weightlifting Championships (Chinese: 全國青年杯舉重錦標賽) held on 29 March 1987, Chang lifted 130.5 kg (288 lb), which shattered his own national record.

Chang competed in the men's 67.5 kg event at the 1988 Summer Olympics. In the Group C competition on 21 September 1988, he lifted 125 kg (276 lb) on his first try and 132.5 kg (292 lb) on his second try which set a national record. On his third try, he unsuccessfully attempted to lift 135 kg (298 lb) and sustained an injury to his hand. Although he placed second in Group C, he withdrew from the competition after the doctor examined him during a break and advised against further participation. His injury was an elbow ligament strain.

Chang received the Chung Cheng Sports Medal (Chinese: 中正體育獎). In 2002, he was the owner of Meili Gym (Chinese: 美力健身房), a gym in Taichung that had been open for 15 years. The gym trained customers in weightlifting, powerlifting, and bodybuilding.
