= Pinye Malaibi =

Papua New Guinean weightlifter

Personal information
- Nationality: Papua New Guinean
- Born: 1962 (age 63–64) Eastern Highlands Province, Papua New Guinea
- Weight: 67 kg (148 lb)

Sport
- Sport: Weightlifting

Pinye Malaibi (born 1962) is a Papua New Guinean weightlifter. He competed in the men's lightweight event at the 1988 Summer Olympics.

== Biography ==
Malaibi was born in 1962 in Eastern Highlands Province, Papua New Guinea. He later moved to the capital, Port Moresby. Weighing at 67 kilograms (148 lb), he competed in weightlifting events as a lightweight. His career was sponsored by the Trukai rice company at several competitions. Malaibi participated at the South Pacific Games in Nouméa, New Caledonia.

In 1988, Malaibi was selected to represent Papua New Guinea at the 1988 Summer Olympics in Seoul, South Korea. At the opening Olympic ceremony, he served as his country's flag bearer. He was one of several Pacific weightlifters who competed in the men's lightweight event (67.5 kilograms (149 lb)) at the Olympics. With lifts totaling 230 kilograms (510 lb), Malaibi finished in 19th place, ahead of only Mohamadamine Alaywan, Joseph Kaddu Kutfesa and Pete Fejeran.

Two years after the Olympics, Malaibi competed for Papua New Guinea at the 1990 Commonwealth Games in Auckland, New Zealand. He then competed at the 1991 South Pacific Games in Port Moresby. This event was sponsored by Trukai, which produced commemorative bags of rice that featured biographical blurbs of weightlifters including Malaibi.
