= Young-jae =

- Hangul: 영재
- RR: Yeongjae
- MR: Yŏngjae
- IPA: [jʌŋd͡ʑe]

Young-jae, also spelled Yeong-jae or Yong-jae, is a Korean given name.

People with this name include:

== Entertainers ==
- Dokgo Young-jae (born Jeon Young-jae, 1953), South Korean actor
- Pyo Yeong-jae (born 1972), South Korean voice actor
- Lee Hwi-jae (born Lee Young-jae, 1973), South Korean television presenter
- Kim Young-jae (actor born 1975), South Korean actor
- Yoo Young-jae (born 1994), South Korean singer, member of B.A.P
- Kim Young-jae (actor, born 1995), South Korean actor
- Choi Young-jae (born 1996), South Korean singer, member of Got7
- Choi Youngjae (born 2005), South Korean singer, member of TWS

== Sportspeople ==
- Park Yeong-jae (born 1960), South Korean weight lifter
- Young-jae Jung (born 1984), South Korean ballet dancer
- Cho Young-jae (born 1985), South Korean sledge hockey player
- Lee Yeong-jae (born 1994), South Korean football midfielder
- Seo Young-jae (born 1995), South Korean football left back

== Other ==
- O Yŏng-jae (born 1935), North Korean poet and propaganda author who wrote a poem about Jong-il Peak
- Kim Yong-jae (born 1952), North Korean diplomat

== Fictional characters ==
- Lee Young-jae, in 2004 South Korean television series Full House
- Kim Young-jae, female character in 2018 South Korean television series The Third Charm

== See also ==
- List of Korean given names
