= Weightlifting at the 1984 Summer Olympics – Men's 82.5 kg =

Weightlifting at the Olympics

Men's 82.5 kg at the Games of the XXIII Olympiad
- Venue: Albert Gersten Pavilion
- Date: 4 August 1984
- Competitors: 19 from 16 nations

Medalists
1st place, gold medalist(s)		Petre Becheru	Romania
2nd place, silver medalist(s)		Robert Kabbas	Australia
3rd place, bronze medalist(s)		Ryoji Isaoka	Japan

The Men's Light-heavyweight Weightlifting Event (–82.5 kg) was the sixth lightest event at the weightlifting competition. Each weightlifter had three attempts for both the snatch and clean and jerk lifting methods. The total of the best successful lift of each method was used to determine the final rankings and medal winners. Competition took place on 4 August in the 4,500 capacity Albert Gersten Pavilion. The weightlifter from Romania won the gold, with a combined lift of 355 kg.

== Results ==
Rank	Athlete	Group	Body weight	Snatch (kg)				Clean & Jerk (kg)				Total (kg)
Rank	Athlete	Group	Body weight	1	2	3	Result	1	2	3	Result	Total (kg)
1st place, gold medalist(s)	Petre Becheru (ROU)	A	81.60	150.0	155.0	~~157.5~~	155.0	190.0	195.0	200.0	200.0	355.0
2nd place, silver medalist(s)	Robert Kabbas (AUS)	A	81.90	145.0	150.0	~~152.5~~	150.0	185.0	192.5	~~195.0~~	192.5	342.5
3rd place, bronze medalist(s)	Ryoji Isaoka (JPN)	A	81.80	150.0	~~155.0~~	~~155.0~~	150.0	190.0	~~200.0~~	~~207.5~~	190.0	340.0
4	Newton Burrowes (GBR)	A	82.00	147.5	~~152.5~~	~~152.5~~	147.5	180.0	~~190.0~~	~~190.0~~	180.0	327.5
5	Ibrahim El-Bakh (EGY)	A	82.25	140.0	145.0	~~147.5~~	147.5	172.5	~~177.5~~	177.5	177.5	325.0
6	Lee Gang-seok (KOR)	A	82.25	135.0	~~140.0~~	140.0	140.0	175.0	182.5	~~185.0~~	182.5	322.5
7	Yvan Darsigny (CAN)	B	82.35	~~137.5~~	137.5	142.5	142.5	170.0	177.5	180.0	180.0	322.5
8	Allister Nalder (NZL)	B	81.25	~~137.5~~	137.5	142.5	142.5	175.0	~~180.0~~	~~180.0~~	175.0	317.5
9	Arn Kritsky (USA)	B	82.05	135.0	140.0	~~142.5~~	140.0	~~175.0~~	175.0	~~182.5~~	175.0	315.0
10	Michael Bernard (NZL)	B	82.30	~~137.5~~	137.5	~~142.5~~	137.5	175.0	~~182.5~~	~~182.5~~	175.0	312.5
11	Bertil Sollevi (SWE)	A	81.85	~~135.0~~	135.0	~~140.0~~	135.0	175.0	~~182.5~~	~~182.5~~	175.0	310.0
12	Anthony Supple (GBR)	B	81.45	~~135.0~~	135.0	~~140.0~~	135.0	172.5	~~177.5~~	~~177.5~~	172.5	307.5
13	Mahmoud Mahgoub (EGY)	B	79.95	135.0	~~140.0~~	140.0	140.0	~~162.5~~	162.5	~~170.0~~	162.5	302.5
14	Juan Rejas (PER)	B	78.50	120.0	~~125.0~~	~~125.0~~	120.0	150.0	~~155.0~~	~~155.0~~	150.0	270.0
–	Yusuf Dalgınlı (TUR)	B	79.20	~~140.0~~	~~140.0~~	~~142.5~~	0.0	—	—	—	—	—
–	Ricardo Salas (PAN)	B	79.55	~~135.0~~	~~135.0~~	~~135.0~~	0.0	162.5	~~170.0~~	172.5	172.5	—
–	Keijo Tahvanainen (FIN)	B	82.05	~~137.5~~	~~137.5~~	~~137.5~~	0.0	175.0	~~180.0~~	~~180.0~~	175.0	—
–	Vasilios Stavridis (GRE)	B	81.55	~~137.5~~	~~137.5~~	~~137.5~~	0.0	—	—	—	—	—
–	Giuseppe Lagrotteria (ITA)	B	81.65	150.0	~~155.0~~	~~155.0~~	150.0	—	—	—	—	—

== Sources ==
- 1984 Summer Olympics Official Report. IOC. 1984. p. 613.
