= Weightlifting at the 1984 Summer Olympics – Men's 52 kg =

Weightlifting at the Olympics

Men's 52 kg at the Games of the XXIII Olympiad
- Venue: Albert Gersten Pavilion
- Date: 29 July 1984
- Competitors: 20 from 15 nations

Medalists
1st place, gold medalist(s)		Zeng Guoqiang	China
2nd place, silver medalist(s)		Zhou Peishun	China
3rd place, bronze medalist(s)		Kazushito Manabe	Japan

The Men's Flyweight Weightlifting Event (– 52 kg) is the lightest event at the weightlifting competition. Each weightlifter had three attempts for both the snatch and clean and jerk lifting methods. The total of the best successful lift of each method was used to determine the final rankings and medal winners. Competition took place on 29 July in the 4,500 capacity Albert Gersten Pavilion. The weightlifter from China won the gold, with a combined lift of 235 kg.

== Results ==
Rank	Athlete	Group	Body weight	Snatch (kg)				Clean & Jerk (kg)				Total (kg)
Rank	Athlete	Group	Body weight	1	2	3	Result	1	2	3	Result	Total (kg)
1st place, gold medalist(s)	Zeng Guoqiang (CHN)	A	51.70	~~100.0~~	100.0	105.0	105.0	130.0	~~135.0~~	~~135.0~~	130.0	235.0
2nd place, silver medalist(s)	Zhou Peishun (CHN)	A	51.80	~~105.0~~	105.0	107.5	107.5	127.5	~~132.5~~	~~132.5~~	127.5	235.0
3rd place, bronze medalist(s)	Kazushito Manabe (JPN)	A	51.80	102.5	~~107.5~~	~~107.5~~	102.5	125.0	~~130.0~~	130.0	130.0	232.5
4	Hidemi Miyashita (JPN)	A	51.90	~~107.5~~	~~107.5~~	107.5	107.5	122.5	~~127.5~~	~~127.5~~	122.5	230.0
5	Maman Suryaman (INA)	A	51.70	102.5	~~107.5~~	~~107.5~~	102.5	125.0	~~130.0~~	~~130.0~~	125.0	227.5
6	Bang Hyo-mun (KOR)	A	51.95	92.5	~~100.0~~	100.0	100.0	117.5	125.0	~~127.5~~	125.0	225.0
7	José Díaz (PAN)	B	51.90	~~90.0~~	90.0	95.0	95.0	120.0	~~125.0~~	125.0	125.0	220.0
8	Levent Erdoğan (TUR)	A	51.85	~~95.0~~	95.0	~~97.5~~	95.0	120.0	~~125.0~~	~~125.0~~	120.0	215.0
9	Meir Daloya (ISR)	A	51.85	90.0	95.0	~~97.5~~	95.0	120.0	~~125.0~~	~~125.0~~	120.0	215.0
10	Mahendran Kannan (IND)	B	51.95	92.5	97.5	100.0	100.0	110.0	115.0	~~120.0~~	115.0	215.0
11	Chung Yung-chi (TPE)	A	51.95	95.0	~~100.0~~	~~100.0~~	95.0	112.5	117.5	~~120.0~~	117.5	212.5
12	Mohamed Hafez El-Sayed (EGY)	B	51.65	87.5	~~92.5~~	92.5	92.5	~~117.5~~	117.5	~~122.5~~	117.5	210.0
13	Antonio Quintana (COL)	B	51.75	90.0	~~95.0~~	~~95.0~~	90.0	~~117.5~~	117.5	~~122.5~~	117.5	207.5
14	Oscar Penagos (COL)	B	51.90	85.0	~~90.0~~	90.0	90.0	110.0	115.0	~~117.5~~	115.0	205.0
15	Chen Shen-yuan (TPE)	B	51.70	82.5	~~90.0~~	90.0	90.0	105.0	~~110.0~~	110.0	110.0	200.0
16	Sunil Munic Silva (SRI)	B	51.55	~~75.0~~	75.0	80.0	80.0	95.0	100.0	~~107.5~~	100.0	180.0
-	Raul Diniz (POR)	B	51.85	82.5	~~87.5~~	~~87.5~~	82.5	~~115.0~~	~~120.0~~	~~125.0~~	—	—
-	Julio Sáez (ESP)	A	51.95	90.0	~~95.0~~	~~95.0~~	90.0	~~115.0~~	~~115.0~~	~~115.0~~	—	—
-	Manikyalu Malla Venkata (IND)	B	51.60	~~85.0~~	~~85.0~~	~~85.0~~	—	—	—	—	EL	EL
-	Mahmoud Tarha (LIB)	A	51.85	97.5	~~102.5~~	102.5	DQ	127.5	~~132.5~~	~~132.5~~	DQ	DQ

== Sources ==
- 1984 Summer Olympics Official Report (PDF). IOC. 1984. p. 612. Archived from the original (PDF) on 17 October 2013.
