= Shanko =

Shanko is a surname.

- Rich Shanko, American weightlifter
- Teklemariam Shanko, Ethiopian footballer
