= Choji =

Choji or Chōji may refer to:

== People ==
- Choji Hosaka (保坂 調司, born 1920), Japanese sport shooter
- Choji Murata (村田 兆治, 1949–2022), Japanese Nippon Professional Baseball pitcher
- Choji Taira (平良 朝治, born 1960), Japanese weightlifter
- Sambo Choji, Nigerian football striker
- Izakaya Chōji, Japanese film director

== Fictional characters ==
- Choji Akimichi, from the manga and anime series Naruto
- Chōji Suitengu, from the manga and anime series Speed Grapher

== Other uses ==
- Chōji (長治), a Japanese era from 1104 to 1106
- Choji station, a commuter railway station in Ansan, South Korea
