= Paulo Duarte =

Paulo Duarte is a Portuguese name, may refer to:

- Paulo Duarte (archaeologist) (1899–1984), Brazilian archaeologist and humanist
- Paulo Duarte (footballer) (born 1969), Portuguese football defender and manager
- Paulo Duarte (weightlifter) (born 1966), Portuguese weightlifter
