= Fejeran =

Fejeran is a surname. Notable people with the surname include:

- Melissa Fejeran (born 1976), weightlifter from Guam
- Pete Fejeran (born 1971), weightlifter from Guam
- Keith Fejeran (born 1991), musician born in San Diego, CA

== See also ==
- Diego Vincent Fejeran Camacho (fl. 2022), member of the Northern Mariana Islands House of Representatives
