= Santra =

Santra is a surname. Notable people with this surname include:

- Isaac Santra (1892–1968), Indian physician
- Kamalakanta Santra (born 1960), Indian weightlifter
- Krishna Chandra Santra, Indian politician
- Manas Kumar Santra, Indian scientist
- Shyamal Santra, Indian politician
