= Chiu Yuh-chuan =

Taiwanese weightlifter

Personal information
- Native name: 邱毓川
- Nationality: Taiwanese
- Born: 21 August 1960 (age 64)

Sport
- Sport: Weightlifting

Chiu Yuh-chuan (Chinese: 邱毓川; born 21 August 1960) is a Taiwanese weightlifter and coach. He competed in the men's bantamweight event at the 1984 Summer Olympics. Chiu set several national records during his weightlifting career. He taught at Chih Cheng Junior High School in Pingtung and Taipei Physical Education College. By 2000, he had become a national weightlifting coach.

== Biography ==
Chiu's family was heavily involved in sports. His father was a physical education teacher, while his uncle, Chiu Shi-you (Chinese: 邱仕友), was a tennis and gymnastics coach at Fu Hsing Kang College. His older brother, Chiu Yuh-yuan (Chinese: 邱毓源), who was a weightlifter, once had the national record in the snatch event in the 67.5 kg (149 lb) weight division. Chiu began weightlifting when he was 14 years old. He represented Pingtung County at Taiwan's Provincial Weightlifting and Bodybuilding Championship in June 1977. He placed first in the flyweight event. In April 1978, Chiu represented Pingtung Wah Chau Commerce and Industry Senior High School at the National High School Weightlifting and Bodybuilding Championships (Chinese: 全國高中舉重健美錦標賽), where he placed first. That month, Chiu represented Taichung at the National Weightlifting Championships (Chinese: 全國舉重錦標賽), where he placed first in the flyweight division. The next year, he represented Taichung again at the National Weightlifting Championships, where he placed first in the bantamweight division.

During a district weightlifting competition in October 1979, Chiu lifted 85 kg (187 lb) in the snatch event and 107.5 kg (237 lb) in the clean and jerk event. In total, he lifted 192.5 kg (424 lb), which broke the district's prior flyweight record of 190 kg (420 lb). In 1980, he competed in the National Weightlifting Championships in the bantamweight division, where he placed first. The next year, he competed in the National Weightlifting Championships in the flyweight division, where he placed first. Lifting a total weight of 195 kg (430 lb), he represented the Provincial Physical Education College (Chinese: 省體專) when he set the national youth record through a snatch of 87.5 kg (193 lb) and a clean and jerk of 107.5 kg (237 lb). During the Taoyuan district games in 1981, Chiu placed first in the clean and jerk and in the total weight. At the 1982 National Weightlifting Championships, Chiu placed first in the bantamweight division.

Chiu competed in April 1983 in the Kaohsiung Mayor's Cup Weightlifting and Bodybuilding Championships (Chinese: 高雄市長杯舉重健美錦標賽). With a clean and jerk of 130.5 kg (288 lb), he broke Tsai Wen-yee's national record of 130 kg (290 lb). Chiu competed as a flyweight in the National Weightlifting Championships and Olympics Athlete Preliminary Selection in April 1983. With a clean and jerk of 125 kg (276 lb), he broke the national record of 120.5 kg (266 lb) and advanced to the next phase of the Olympics selection held in October. He began training in Tainan to prepare for the Olympics selection. Chiu competed in the bantamweight division in the Baosheng Emperor Cup Weightlifting Championships (Chinese: 保生大帝杯舉重錦標賽), where he lifted 131 kg (289 lb) in the clean and jerk and broke a national record. He received the 3rd-level Zhongzheng Sports Medal (Chinese: 中正體育獎章) awarded by the Republic of China Sports Federation in 1983.

Around 1983, Chiu graduated from the National Taiwan University of Sport. His inability to secure employment for over a year after his university graduation hindered his ability to practice stress-free. Although he owned a co-owned a gym in Pingtung with his brother, he wished to obtain a more consistent job to allow him to concentrate on practicing. Bringing the medals he had won, Chiu met with the Pingtung County education director to seek employment but was turned down because of a lack of teaching roles. Chiu had spent almost a year practicing in Tainan and Zuoying District after being chosen for Taiwan's national weightlifting team. He got a monthly stipend of NT$1,000 (US$36). After reviewing media coverage about Chiu's situation, Taipei's Qinyi Trading Company (Chinese: 慶宜貿易有限公司) gave him a job offer in marketing and promotional planning with a monthly salary of NT$18,000 (US$644). Chiu competed in Group B in the men's bantamweight event at the 1984 Summer Olympics where he was 12th out of 20 contestants. After lifting 132.5 kg (292 lb) in the clean and jerk, he set a national record. He lifted 97.5 kg (215 lb) in the snatch, which gave him a combined weight of 230 kg (510 lb) which was a personal record. After Chiu returned home from the Olympics, he was still trying to find a job.

On 25 December 1985, Chiu was driving a minivan in Changzhi in Pingtung when he accidentally struck a three-year-old girl, Tu Yu-lan (Chinese: 涂毓蘭), at 10:45 am. She had been preparing to walk across the road. Chiu braked but was unable to stop before hitting her. Tu, who sustained serious head injuries, was hospitalised and died. Chiu received a sentence of seven months in prison and a two-year suspended sentence. At the time of his sentencing, he was a physical education instructor at Chih Cheng Junior High School (Chinese: 至正國中屏東) in Pingtung. Chiu taught at Taipei Physical Education College before resigning in July 2000. Chiu was a national weightlifting coach in 2000 and coached Chen Jui-lien. A 2003 article said he was married to the weightlifter Li Feng-ying.
