= Erich Seidel =

Erich or Erik Seidel may refer to:

- Erich Seidel (canoeist), West German slalom canoeist
- Erich Seidel (ophthalmologist), German ophthalmologist
- Erik Seidel, American poker player

== See also ==
- Erich Seidl, Austrian weightlifter
