= Ichiba Station =

Ichiba Station (市場駅) is the name of three train stations in Japan:

- Ichiba Station (Fukuoka)
- Ichiba Station (JR West)
- Ichiba Station (Shintetsu)

== See also ==
- Tōkaichiba Station (disambiguation)
- Tsurumi-Ichiba Station
