= Ashraf Mohamed =

Egyptian weightlifter

Mohamed
Personal information
- Full name: Mohamed Ashraf Mohamed El Sayed
- Nationality: Egyptian
- Born: 19 May 2001 (age 25)

Sport
- Sport: Weightlifting

Ashraf Mohamed (born 30 July 1962) is an Egyptian weightlifter. He competed in the men's heavyweight II event at the 1984 Summer Olympics.
