= Lee Gang-seok (weightlifter) =

South Korean weightlifter

Personal information
- Nationality: South Korean
- Born: 1 April 1960 (age 64)

Sport
- Sport: Weightlifting

Lee Gang-seok (born 1 April 1960) is a South Korean weightlifter. He competed in the men's light heavyweight event at the 1984 Summer Olympics.
