= Julio Sáez =

Spanish weightlifter

Personal information
- Nationality: Spanish
- Born: 23 December 1956 (age 68); Madrid, Spain

Sport
- Sport: Weightlifting

Julio Sáez (born 23 December 1956) is a Spanish weightlifter. He competed in the men's flyweight event at the 1984 Summer Olympics.
