= José Garces =

Mexican weightlifter (born 1960)

Personal information
- Nationality: Mexican
- Born: 21 November 1960 (age 65)

Sport
- Sport: Weightlifting

José Garces (born 21 November 1960) is a Mexican weightlifter. He competed in the men's middle heavyweight event at the 1984 Summer Olympics.
