= Taveuni Ofisa =

Samoan weightlifter

Personal information
- Nationality: Samoan
- Born: 14 July 1964 (age 61)

Sport
- Sport: Weightlifting

Taveuni Ofisa (born 14 July 1964) is a Samoan former weightlifter. He competed in the men's lightweight event at the 1988 Summer Olympics.
