= Bang Hyo-mun =

South Korean weightlifter (born 1965)

Personal information
- Nationality: South Korean
- Born: 8 September 1965 (age 59)

Sport
- Sport: Weightlifting

Bang Hyo-mun (born 8 September 1965) is a South Korean weightlifter. He competed in the men's flyweight event at the 1984 Summer Olympics.
