= Hasan Has =

Turkish weightlifter

Personal information
- Nationality: Turkish
- Born: 15 January 1960 (age 65)

Sport
- Sport: Weightlifting

Hasan Has (born 15 January 1960) is a Turkish weightlifter. He competed in the men's middleweight event at the 1984 Summer Olympics.
