= Ken Clark (weightlifter) =

American weightlifter (born 1955)

Personal information
- Born: November 10, 1955 (age 70) San Francisco, California, United States

Sport
- Sport: Weightlifting

Ken Clark (born November 10, 1955) is an American former weightlifter. He competed in the men's heavyweight I event at the 1984 Summer Olympics.
