= Oscar Palma =

Colombian weightlifter (born 1955)

Personal information
- Nationality: Colombian
- Born: 7 October 1955 (age 71)

Sport
- Sport: Weightlifting

Oscar Palma (born 7 October 1955) is a Colombian former weightlifter. He competed in the men's featherweight event at the 1984 Summer Olympics.
