= Olaf Peters =

German weightlifter

Personal information
- Nationality: German
- Born: 14 July 1964 (age 60); Hamburg, Germany

Sport
- Sport: Weightlifting

Olaf Peters (born 14 July 1964) is a German weightlifter. He competed in the men's heavyweight II event at the 1984 Summer Olympics.
