= István Kerek =

Hungarian weightlifter

Personal information
- Nationality: Hungarian
- Born: 12 December 1964 (age 60); Debrecen, Hungary

Sport
- Sport: Weightlifting

István Kerek (born 12 December 1964) is a Hungarian weightlifter who competed in the men's lightweight event at the 1988 Summer Olympics.
