= Manikyalu Malla Venkata =

Indian weightlifter (born 1958)

Malla Venkata Manikyalu
Personal information
- Nationality: Indian
- Born: 13 May 1958 (age 66); Anakapalle, Andhra Pradesh, India

Sport
- Sport: Weightlifting

Malla Venkata Manikyalu (born 13 May 1958) is an Indian weightlifter. He competed in the men's flyweight event at the 1984 Summer Olympics, despite alleged attempts to prevent him from competing at the Olympics by his chief coach, S.S. Silwan.
