= Mircea Tuli =

Romanian weightlifter

Personal information
- Nationality: Romanian
- Born: 25 December 1957 (age 67); Târnăveni, Romania

Sport
- Sport: Weightlifting

Mircea Tuli (born 25 December 1957) is a Romanian weightlifter. He competed in the men's featherweight event at the 1984 Summer Olympics.
