= Guy Carlton =

American weightlifter (1954–2001)

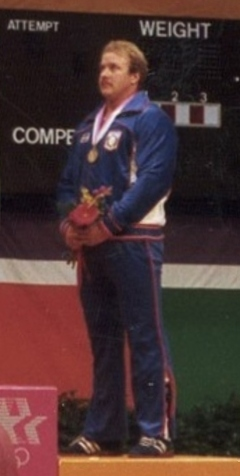
- Carlton at the 1984 Olympics

Personal information
- Born: Guy Albert Carlton; January 16, 1954 Amherst, Ohio, U.S.
- Died: May 11, 2001 (aged 47) Arrowsmith, Illinois, U.S.
- Height: 1.83 m (6 ft 0 in)
- Weight: 110 kg (240 lb)

Sport
- Country: United States
- Sport: Weightlifting
- Event: Heavyweight
- Club: York Barbell Club
Medal record
Representing United States
Olympic Games
Bronze medal – third place	1984 Los Angeles	-110 kg
Pan American Games
Silver medal – second place	1979 San Juan	-100 kg

Guy Albert Carlton (January 16, 1954 – May 11, 2001) was an American weightlifter who won a bronze medal at the 1984 Summer Olympics and a silver medal at the 1979 Pan American Games.

== Sporting career ==
Based out of Colorado, Carlton was the US National Heavyweight Champion twice, in 1981 and 1984.

At the 1984 Summer Olympics, Carlton was a bronze medalist in the heavyweight competition, held at Loyola Marymount University's Albert Gersten Pavilion. In his final clean and jerk, with the bronze medal secure, the 30-year old went for the gold medal by attempting a personal best lift of 225 kg, but was unable to get the bar to his chest. His previous best total, 377.5 kg, was enough for the bronze medal, behind Italy's Norberto Oberburger and Romanian lifter Ştefan Taşnadi. He remains, along with Mario Martinez, the last American male to win an Olympic weightlifting medal until 2024.

== Personal life ==
Born in Amherst, Ohio to Guy E. and Elizabeth Carlton, he later moved to Illinois and went to high school in Decatur, then college at Eastern Illinois University.

He married wife Jan Dodd in 1980 and was a father to four daughters.

=== Death ===
Carlton was found dead from gunshot wounds at his home in Arrowsmith, Illinois in May 2001. Notes found at the scene, as well as witness testimony, suggested that Carlton had intended to take his own life. His death was ruled a suicide.
