= Giannis Gerontas =

Greek weightlifter (born 1962)

Personal information
- Nationality: Greek
- Born: 23 January 1962 (age 63)

Sport
- Sport: Weightlifting

Giannis Gerontas (born 23 January 1962) is a Greek weightlifter. He competed in the men's heavyweight II event at the 1984 Summer Olympics.
