= Henri Høeg =

Danish weightlifter

Personal information
- Nationality: Danish
- Born: 26 June 1954 (age 70); Aarhus, Denmark

Sport
- Sport: Weightlifting

Henri Høeg (born 26 June 1954) is a Danish weightlifter. He competed in the men's middle heavyweight event at the 1984 Summer Olympics.
