= Mohamed Youssef (weightlifter) =

Egyptian weightlifter

Personal information
- Nationality: Egyptian
- Born: 17 November 1956 (age 68)

Sport
- Sport: Weightlifting

Mohamed Youssef (born 17 November 1956) is an Egyptian weightlifter. He competed in the men's featherweight event at the 1984 Summer Olympics.
