= Park Chun-jong =

South Korean weightlifter

Personal information
- Nationality: South Korean
- Born: 28 December 1961 (age 63)

Sport
- Sport: Weightlifting

Park Chun-jong (born 28 December 1961) is a South Korean weightlifter. He competed in the men's middleweight event at the 1984 Summer Olympics.
