= Ahmed Fouad Aly =

Egyptian weightlifter

Personal information
- Nationality: Egyptian
- Born: 30 June 1961 (age 63)

Sport
- Sport: Weightlifting

Ahmed Fouad Aly (born 30 June 1961) is an Egyptian weightlifter. He competed in the men's middleweight event at the 1984 Summer Olympics.
