= Li Jinhe =

Chinese weightlifter

Medal record

Men's Weightlifting

Olympic Games
Bronze medal – third place	1988 Seoul	60-67.5 kg

Li Jinhe (Chinese: 李金河; born 22 May 1964) is a male Chinese weightlifter. He competed at the 1988 Seoul Olympics, and won a bronze medal in Men's 67.5 kg. His final score was 325 kg.
