= Ji Ju-hyeon =

South Korean weightlifter

Personal information
- Nationality: South Korean
- Born: 11 February 1964 (age 61)

Sport
- Sport: Weightlifting

Ji Ju-hyeon (born 11 February 1964) is a South Korean weightlifter. He competed in the men's featherweight event at the 1984 Summer Olympics.
