= Bijay Kumar Satpathy =

Indian weightlifter (1951 or 1952 – 2025)

Personal information
- Nationality: Indian
- Born: Bijay Kumar Satpathy; 1951 or 1952 Berhampur, Orissa, India
- Died: 22 September 2025 (aged 73) Berhampur, Odisha, India

Sport
- Country: India
- Sport: Weightlifting
Medal record
Men's weightlifting
Representing India
Commonwealth Games
Silver medal – second place	1982 Brisbane	Bantamweight
Asian Weightlifting Championships
Bronze medal – third place	1981 Nagoya	56 kg
Bronze medal – third place	1983 Damascus	56 kg

Bijay Kumar Satpathy (1951 or 1952 – 22 September 2025) was an Indian weightlifter who won the silver medal in the men's Bantamweight event at 1982 Commonwealth Games. He was conferred with the Arjuna Award in the year 1981–82 by the Government of India. He died at his residence in Berhampur, Odisha, on 22 September 2025, at the age of 73.

== Career ==
Satpathy was a five-time national champion in weightlifting from 1977–78 to 1982–83 and represented the Indian Navy and Indian Railways. He won the gold medal at the 1981 Mini Commonwealth Games and later followed up with silver at the 1982 main event at Brisbane. He won the bronze medal at the 1981 and 1983 Asian Weightlifting Championships.

== See also ==
- List of National Sports Award recipients in Olympic sports
