= Ric Eaton =

American weightlifter

Personal information
- Born: December 7, 1962 Tucson, Arizona, United States
- Died: 12 June 2015 (aged 52)

Sport
- Sport: Weightlifting

Ric Eaton (December 7, 1962 – June 12, 2015) was an American weightlifter. He competed in the men's heavyweight II event at the 1984 Summer Olympics.
