= Leo Isaac (weightlifter) =

British weightlifter (born 1954)

Personal information
- Nationality: English and Australian
- Born: 8 November 1954 (age 70)

Leo Isaac (born 8 November 1954) is a male former weightlifter who competed for Great Britain in the years 1975-82, England in the Commonwealth Games and Australia in 1985.

== Weightlifting career ==
Isaac represented Great Britain in the 67.5 kg category at the 1980 Summer Olympics, and the 1979 World Weightlifting Championships, Greece and in the 75 Kg category at the 1981 World Weightlifting Championships, France.

He represented England in the 75 kg category at the 1982 Commonwealth Games in Brisbane, Queensland, Australia. He finished in fourth place behind teammate Steve Pinsent.

In 1983, he emigrated to Australia where he still resides and represented Australia in the 67.5Kg category at the 1985 World Weightlifting Championships, Sweden.

== Publications ==
- Coaching Weightlifting Illustrated: A systematic approach to coaching beginners, ISBN 9780646850634
