= Michael Jacques =

American weightlifter

Personal information
- Nationality: American
- Born: January 3, 1961 (age 65) St. Albans, Vermont, United States

Sport
- Sport: Weightlifting

Michael Jacques (born January 3, 1961) is an American weightlifter. He competed in the men's lightweight event at the 1988 Summer Olympics.
