= Olavi Blomfjord =

Swedish weightlifter

Personal information
- Nationality: Swedish
- Born: 10 August 1961 (age 63); Ludvika, Sweden

Sport
- Sport: Weightlifting

Olavi Blomfjord (born 10 August 1961) is a Swedish weightlifter. He competed in the men's heavyweight I event at the 1984 Summer Olympics.
