= Jean-Marie Kretz =

French weightlifter

Personal information
- Nationality: French
- Born: 29 December 1958 (age 66)

Sport
- Sport: Weightlifting

Jean-Marie Kretz (born 29 December 1958) is a French weightlifter. He competed in the men's heavyweight I event at the 1984 Summer Olympics.
