= Ibrahim Shaban =

Egyptian weightlifter

Personal information
- Nationality: Egyptian
- Born: 21 April 1953 (age 71)

Sport
- Sport: Weightlifting

Ibrahim Shaban (born 21 April 1953) is an Egyptian weightlifter. He competed in the men's middle heavyweight event at the 1984 Summer Olympics.
