= Park Tae-min (weightlifter) =

South Korean weightlifter

Personal information
- Nationality: South Korean
- Born: 20 November 1967 (age 57)

Sport
- Sport: Weightlifting

Park Tae-min (born 20 November 1967) is a South Korean weightlifter. He competed in the men's lightweight event at the 1988 Summer Olympics.
