= Mehmet Altin =

Turkish weightlifter (born 1959)

Personal information
- Nationality: Turkish
- Born: 15 July 1959 (age 66)

Sport
- Sport: Weightlifting

Mehmet Altin (born 15 July 1959) is a Turkish weightlifter. He competed in the men's bantamweight event at the 1984 Summer Olympics.
