= Mahmoud Tarha =

Lebanese weightlifter

Personal information
- Nationality: Lebanese
- Born: 1 April 1962 (age 62)

Sport
- Sport: Weightlifting

Mahmoud Tarha (born 1 April 1962) is a Lebanese weightlifter. He competed in the men's flyweight event at the 1984 Summer Olympics.

Tarha initially placed fourth in his event, but was later disqualified after testing positive for steroids and was suspended from international competition for life.
