= Juan Rejas =

Peruvian weightlifter

Personal information
- Nationality: Peruvian
- Born: 14 August 1962 (age 62)

Sport
- Sport: Weightlifting

Juan Rejas (born 14 August 1962) is a Peruvian weightlifter. He competed in the men's light heavyweight event at the 1984 Summer Olympics.
