= Göran Pettersson (weightlifter) =

Swedish weightlifter

Personal information
- Nationality: Swedish
- Born: 1 October 1961 (age 63); Knivsta, Sweden

Sport
- Sport: Weightlifting

Göran Pettersson (born 1 October 1961) is a Swedish weightlifter. He competed in the men's heavyweight II event at the 1984 Summer Olympics.
