= Deven Govindasami =

Indian weightlifter (born 1963)

G. Deven
Personal information
- Full name: Deven Govindasami
- Nationality: Indian
- Born: 5 May 1963 (age 61); Vellore, Tamil Nadu, India

Sport
- Sport: Weightlifting

Deven Govindasami (also Devan, born 5 May 1963) is an Indian weightlifter. He competed in the men's bantamweight event at the 1984 Summer Olympics.

He won the gold medals in the men's 60 kg event at the 1985 and 1987 Commonwealth Weightlifting Championships. He won the gold medals in the men's 56 kg event at the 1984 South Asian Games at Nepal and the men's 60 kg event at the 1987 South Asian Games at Calcutta. He was conferred with the Arjuna Award in the year 1987 by the Government of India.
