= Georgios Panagiotakis =

Greek weightlifter (born 1960)

Personal information
- Nationality: Greek
- Born: 30 March 1960 (age 64)

Sport
- Sport: Weightlifting

Georgios Panagiotakis (born 30 March 1960) is a Greek weightlifter. He competed in the men's heavyweight II event at the 1984 Summer Olympics.
