= Vasilios Stavridis =

Greek weightlifter (born 1963)

Personal information
- Nationality: Greek
- Born: 3 June 1963 (age 61)

Sport
- Sport: Weightlifting

Vasilios Stavridis (born 3 June 1963) is a Greek weightlifter. He competed in the men's light heavyweight event at the 1984 Summer Olympics.
