= Fred Bunjo =

Ugandan weightlifter

Personal information
- Nationality: Ugandan
- Born: 14 March 1965 (age 60)

Sport
- Sport: Weightlifting

Fred Bunjo (born 14 March 1965) is a Ugandan weightlifter. He competed in the men's middleweight event at the 1984 Summer Olympics.
