= Maged Mohamed =

Egyptian weightlifter

Personal information
- Nationality: Egyptian
- Born: 10 August 1962 (age 62)

Sport
- Sport: Weightlifting

Maged Mohamed (born 10 August 1962) is an Egyptian weightlifter. He competed in the men's middle heavyweight event at the 1984 Summer Olympics.
