= Iordanis Ilioudis =

Greek weightlifter (born 1961)

Personal information
- Nationality: Greek
- Born: 26 February 1961 (age 65) Psychiko, Serres, Greece

Sport
- Sport: Weightlifting

Achievements and titles
- Olympic finals: 1984 Summer Olympics

Iordanis Ilioudis (born 26 February 1961) is a Greek weightlifter. He competed in the men's middleweight event at the 1984 Summer Olympics.

He born and hails from Psychiko, Serres.
