= Emmanuel Oshomah =

Nigerian weightlifter

Personal information
- Nationality: Nigerian
- Born: 5 January 1964 (age 61)

Sport
- Sport: Weightlifting

Emmanuel Oshomah (born 5 January 1964) is a Nigerian weightlifter. He competed in the men's middle heavyweight event at the 1984 Summer Olympics.
