= Roman Kainz =

Austrian weightlifter

Personal information
- Nationality: Austrian
- Born: 14 November 1956 (age 68)

Sport
- Sport: Weightlifting

Roman Kainz (born 14 November 1956) is an Austrian weightlifter. He competed in the men's middleweight event at the 1984 Summer Olympics.
