= Meir Daloya =

Israeli weightlifter

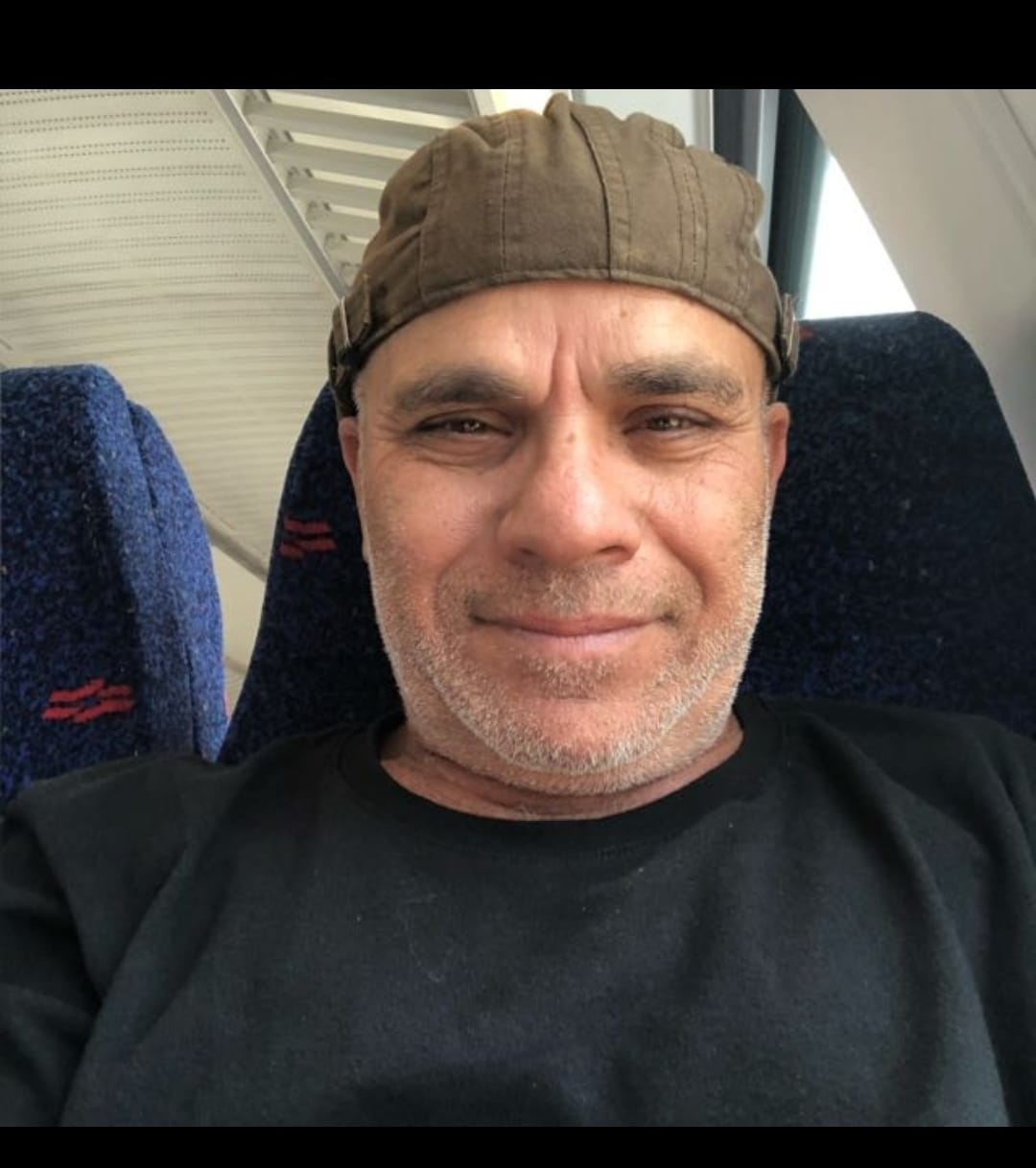

Personal information
- Native name: מאיר דלויה
- Born: February 7, 1956 Israel
- Died: January 27, 2024 (aged 67)
- Height: 5 ft 1 in (155 cm)
- Weight: 115 lb (52 kg)

Sport
- Country: Israel
- Sport: Weightlifting
- Weight class: Men's Flyweight

Meir Daloya (Hebrew: מאיר דלויה; February 7, 1956 – January 27, 2024) was an Israeli Olympic weightlifter. He was born in Israel, and was Jewish.

== Weightlifting career ==
He came in 8th in the 1981 World Weightlifting Championships, lifting 212.5 kg. The following year he came in 11th in the 1982 World Weightlifting Championships, lifting 217.5 kg.

He competed for Israel at the 1984 Summer Olympics in Los Angeles at the age of 27, in Weightlifting--Men's Flyweight (52 kg). He came in 9th, after lifting 215 kg (474 lb). When he competed in the Olympics, he was 5 feet 1 inch (155 cm) tall, and weighed 115 pounds (52 kg).
