= Abuaihuda Ozon =

Syrian weightlifter

Personal information
- Nationality: Syrian
- Born: 1 September 1959 (age 65)

Sport
- Sport: Weightlifting

Abuaihuda Ozon (born 1 September 1959) is a Syrian weightlifter. He competed in the men's heavyweight II event at the 1984 Summer Olympics.
