= Reijo Kiiskilä =

Finnish weightlifter

Personal information
- Nationality: Finnish
- Born: 2 October 1964; Sievi, Finland
- Died: 15 November 2002 (aged 38); Sievi, Finland

Sport
- Sport: Weightlifting

Reijo Kiiskilä (2 October 1964 – 15 November 2002) was a Finnish weightlifter. He competed in the men's lightweight event at the 1988 Summer Olympics.
