= John Kyazze =

Ugandan weightlifter

Personal information
- Nationality: Ugandan
- Born: 1 February 1954 (age 72)

Sport
- Sport: Weightlifting

John Kyazze (born 1 February 1954) is a Ugandan weightlifter. He competed in the men's heavyweight II event at the 1984 Summer Olympics.
