= Kaoru Wabiko =

Japanese weightlifter

Personal information
- Nationality: Japanese
- Born: 20 October 1957 (age 67)

Sport
- Sport: Weightlifting

Kaoru Wabiko (born 20 October 1957) is a Japanese weightlifter. He competed in the men's featherweight event at the 1984 Summer Olympics.
