= Edvaldo Santos =

Brazilian weightlifter

Personal information
- Nationality: Brazilian
- Born: 18 April 1966 (age 59)

Sport
- Sport: Weightlifting

Edvaldo Santos (born 18 April 1966) is a Brazilian weightlifter. He competed in the men's lightweight event at the 1988 Summer Olympics.
