= Dean Willey =

British weightlifter

Personal information
- Born: 9 June 1962 (age 64) Rotherham, England
- Height: 167 cm (5 ft 6 in)
- Weight: 74 kg (163 lb)

Sport
- Weight class: 67.5 kg
- Club: Phoenix
- Team: National team
Medal record
Weightlifting
Representing Great Britain
World Championships
Bronze medal – third place	1984	67.5 kg (snatch)
Representing England
Commonwealth Games
Gold medal – first place	1982 Brisbane	60kg featherweight
Gold medal – first place	1986 Edinburgh	67.5kg lightweight

Dean Willey (born 9 June 1962 in Rotherham) is a British former weightlifter.

== Weightlifting career ==
Willey competed in the 67.5 kg category and represented Great Britain at international competitions. He won the bronze medal in the snatch at the 1984 World Weightlifting Championships lifting 140.0 kg. He participated at the 1984 Summer Olympics in the 67.5 kg event and also at the 1988 Summer Olympics.

He represented England and won a gold medal in the 60 kg featherweight, at the 1982 Commonwealth Games in Brisbane, Queensland, Australia. Four years later he won a second gold medal in the heavier category of 67.5 kg lightweight, when representing England at the 1986 Commonwealth Games in Edinburgh, Scotland.
