= Daniel Cassiau-Haurie =

French weightlifter

Personal information
- Nationality: French
- Born: 21 February 1961 (age 64)

Sport
- Sport: Weightlifting

Daniel Cassiau-Haurie (born 21 February 1961) is a French weightlifter. He competed in the men's middleweight event at the 1984 Summer Olympics.
