= Kim Chil-bong =

South Korean weightlifter

Personal information
- Nationality: South Korean
- Born: 6 August 1961 (age 63)

Sport
- Sport: Weightlifting

Kim Chil-bong (born 6 August 1961) is a South Korean weightlifter. He competed in the men's bantamweight event at the 1984 Summer Olympics.
