= Daniel Tschan =

Swiss weightlifter

Personal information
- Nationality: Swiss
- Born: 17 June 1960 (age 64)

Sport
- Sport: Weightlifting

Daniel Tschan (born 17 June 1960) is a Swiss weightlifter. He competed in the men's middle heavyweight event at the 1984 Summer Olympics.
