= Josef Span =

Austrian weightlifter

Personal information
- Nationality: Austrian
- Born: 1 March 1962 (age 63)

Sport
- Sport: Weightlifting

Josef Span (born 1 March 1962) is an Austrian weightlifter. He competed in the men's middle heavyweight event at the 1984 Summer Olympics, achieving ninth place.
