= Albert Hood =

American weightlifter

Personal information
- Born: August 7, 1964 Los Angeles, California, United States
- Died: September 1994

Sport
- Sport: Weightlifting

Albert Hood (August 7, 1964 – September 1994) was an American weightlifter. He competed in the men's bantamweight event at the 1984 Summer Olympics.
