= Jagadish Pradhan =

Nepalese weightlifter

Personal information
- Nationality: Nepalese

Sport
- Sport: Weightlifting

Jagadish Pradhan is a Nepalese weightlifter. He competed in the men's bantamweight event at the 1984 Summer Olympics.
