= Jaime Molina (weightlifter) =

Peruvian weightlifter (born 1962)

Personal information
- Nationality: Peruvian
- Born: 3 August 1962 (age 62)

Sport
- Sport: Weightlifting

Jaime Molina (born 3 August 1962) is a Peruvian weightlifter. He competed in the men's middle heavyweight event at the 1984 Summer Olympics.
