= Oliver Orok =

Nigerian weightlifter (born 1963)

Personal information
- Nationality: Nigerian
- Born: 3 July 1963 (age 62)
- Height: 172 cm (5 ft 8 in)
- Weight: 100 kg (220 lb)

Sport
- Country: Nigeria
- Sport: Weightlifting
- Weight class: 100 kg
- Team: National team
Medal record
Men's Weightlifting
Representing Nigeria
Commonwealth Games
Gold medal – first place	1982	350 (sub heavyweight)
World Championships
Gold medal – first place	1984	100 kg (snatch)
- Updated on 16 September 2025

Oliver Orok (born 3 July 1963) is a Nigerian male former weightlifter, who competed in the 100 kg category and represented Nigeria at international competitions. He won the gold medal in the snatch at the 1984 World Weightlifting Championships lifting 172.5 kg. He participated at the 1984 Summer Olympics in the 100 kg event.
