= Tony Pignone =

Australian weightlifter (born 1960)

Personal information
- Nationality: Australian
- Born: 18 March 1960 (age 66)

Sport
- Sport: Weightlifting
Medal record
Weightlifting
Commonwealth Games
Silver medal – second place	1982 Brisbane	Middleweight

Tony Pignone (born 18 March 1960) is an Australian former weightlifter. He competed in the men's middleweight event at the 1984 Summer Olympics.
