= Wang Guofeng =

Chinese weightlifter

Personal information
- Nationality: Chinese
- Born: 1 March 1963 (age 62)

Sport
- Sport: Weightlifting

Wang Guofeng (born 1 March 1963) is a Chinese weightlifter. He competed in the men's featherweight event at the 1984 Summer Olympics.
