= Kamalakanta Santra =

Indian weightlifter (born 1960)

Personal information
- Nationality: Indian
- Born: 1 July 1960 (age 64); West Bengal, India

Sport
- Sport: Weightlifting

Kamalakanta Santra (born 1 July 1960) is an Indian weightlifter. He competed in the men's featherweight event at the 1984 Summer Olympics.
