= Geoff Laws =

British weightlifter

Personal information
- Nationality: English
- Born: 19 December 1956 (age 69) London

Sport
- Club: Grove Hall
Medal record
weightlifting
Representing England
Commonwealth Games
Gold medal – first place	1982 Brisbane	56kg bantamweight

Geoffrey 'Geoff' Laws (born 1956), is a male former weightlifter who competed for Great Britain and England.

== Weightlifting career ==
Laws represented Great Britain in the 1980 Summer Olympics and 1984 Summer Olympics.

He represented England and won a gold medal in the 56 kg bantamweight division, at the 1982 Commonwealth Games in Brisbane, Queensland, Australia. Four years later he represented England in the 60 kg featherweight division at the 1986 Commonwealth Games in Edinburgh, Scotland and represented England in a third Games, at the 1990 Commonwealth Games in Auckland, New Zealand.
