= Emila Huch =

Samoan weightlifter

Personal information
- Nationality: Samoan
- Born: 15 June 1951 (age 73)

Sport
- Sport: Weightlifting

Emila L. Huch (born 15 June 1951) is a Samoan former weightlifter. He competed in the men's middle heavyweight event at the 1984 Summer Olympics.
