= Franz Langthaler =

Austrian weightlifter

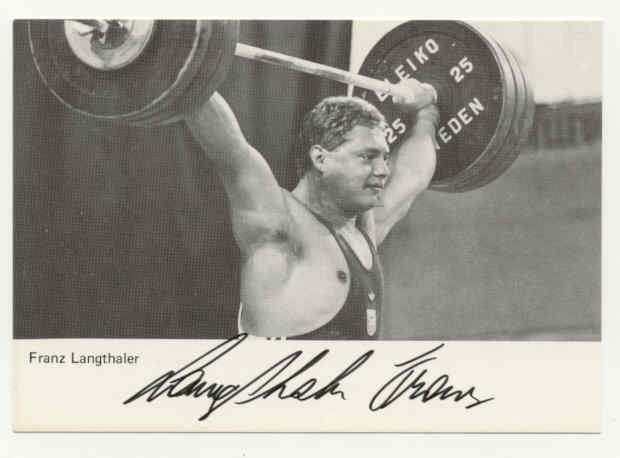
- Franz Langthaler in 1988

Personal information
- Nationality: Austrian
- Born: 10 November 1964 (age 60); Vienna, Austria

Sport
- Sport: Weightlifting

Franz Langthaler (born 10 November 1964) is an Austrian weightlifter. He competed at the 1984 Summer Olympics and the 1988 Summer Olympics.
