= Jacques Demers (weightlifter) =

Canadian weightlifter (born 1960)

Medal record

Men's weightlifting

Olympic Games
Silver medal – second place	1984 Los Angeles	67.5 – 75 kg

Jacques Demers (born July 27, 1960) is a Canadian weightlifter. He was born in Montreal. He won a silver medal in the men's middleweight category (75 kg) at the 1984 Summer Olympics.

On 31 October 1983, Demers and fellow Canadian weightlifters Terrence Hadlow, Michel Pietracupa, and Mario Parente were detained at Montreal's Mirabel Airport after Canadian Customs Agents discovered a cache or anabolic steroids in their luggage. More than 22,000 Dianabol tablets and 400 vials of synthetic testosterone were seized. All four men were charged with importing pharmaceutical drugs with the intent to distribute under Canada's Food and Drug Act. Unfettered by the impending charges against him, Demers went on to earn a silver medal in the 75-kg class at the 1984 Summer Olympics in Los Angeles.
