= Tom Söderholm =

Swedish weightlifter

Personal information
- Nationality: Swedish
- Born: 20 December 1953 (age 71); Uppsala, Sweden

Sport
- Sport: Weightlifting

Tom Söderholm (born 20 December 1953) is a Swedish weightlifter. He competed at the 1984 Summer Olympics and the 1988 Summer Olympics.
