= Xiao Minglin =

Chinese weightlifter

Personal information
- Nationality: Chinese
- Born: 3 October 1964 (age 60)

Sport
- Sport: Weightlifting

Xiao Minglin (born 3 October 1964) is a Chinese weightlifter. He competed in the men's lightweight event at the 1988 Summer Olympics.
