= Zhang Guofeng =

Chinese footballer

Zhang Guofeng 张国锋
Personal information
- Date of birth: January 6, 1989 (age 37)
- Place of birth: Jilin, China
- Height: 1.77 m (5 ft 9 1/2 in)
- Position: Midfielder

Senior career*
Years	Team	Apps	(Gls)
2011–2015	Shenzhen Ruby	1	(0)
2012	→ Shenzhen Main Sports (loan)	8	(0)
- * Club domestic league appearances and goals as of 1 November 2015

Zhang Guofeng (Chinese: 张国锋; born 6 January 1989) is a Chinese football player who currently plays for China League One side Shenzhen Ruby.

== Club career ==
In 2011, Zhang Guofeng started his professional footballer career with Shenzhen Ruby in the Chinese Super League. He made his league debut for Shenzhen on 8 May 2011 in a game against Guangzhou Evergrande, coming on as a substitute for Andy Nägelein in the 78th minute. In 2012, he was loaned to China League Two side Shenzhen Main Sports until 31 December.

== Career statistics ==
Statistics accurate as of match played 1 November 2015

Club performance			League		Cup		League Cup		Continental		Total	
Season	Club	League	Apps	Goals	Apps	Goals	Apps	Goals	Apps	Goals	Apps	Goals
China PR			League		FA Cup		CSL Cup		Asia		Total	
2011	Shenzhen Ruby	Chinese Super League	1	0	0	0	-		-		1	0
2012	Shenzhen Main Sports	China League Two	8	0	0	0	-		-		8	0
2013	Shenzhen Ruby	China League One	0	0	0	0	-		-		0	0
2014	Shenzhen Ruby	China League One	0	0	0	0	-		-		0	0
2015	Shenzhen Ruby	China League One	0	0	0	0	-		-		0	0
Total	China PR		9	0	0	0	0	0	0	0	9	0
