= Park Yeong-jae =

South Korean weightlifter

Personal information
- Nationality: South Korean
- Born: 3 September 1960 (age 64)

Sport
- Sport: Weightlifting

Park Yeong-jae (born 3 September 1960) is a South Korean weightlifter. He competed in the men's middleweight event at the 1984 Summer Olympics.
