= Uolevi Kahelin =

Finnish weightlifter

Personal information
- Nationality: Finnish
- Born: 17 June 1950 (age 74); Kokkola, Finland

Sport
- Sport: Weightlifting

Uolevi Kahelin (born 17 June 1950) is a Finnish weightlifter. He competed in the men's featherweight event at the 1984 Summer Olympics.
