= Masahiro Kotaka =

Japanese weightlifter (born 1960)

Personal information
- Born: February 18, 1960 (age 66) Hyogo, Japan
- Height: 1.56 m (5 ft 1 in)
- Weight: 56 kg (123 lb)

Sport
- Sport: Weightlifting
Medal record
Representing Japan
Olympic Games
Bronze medal – third place	1984 Los Angeles	Bantamweight
World Championships
Bronze medal – third place	1984 Los Angeles	Bantamweight

Masahiro Kotaka (小高正宏, Kotaka Masahiro; born February 18, 1960) is a retired Japanese weightlifter. He won a bronze medal in the bantamweight category at the 1984 Summer Olympics, which was combined with the world championships.
