= Albert Squires =

Canadian weightlifter

Personal information
- Born: 17 August 1958 (age 68) St. John's, Newfoundland and Labrador, Canada

Sport
- Sport: Weightlifting

Albert Squires (born 17 August 1958) is a Canadian weightlifter. He competed in the men's heavyweight II event at the 1984 Summer Olympics.
