= Michael Bernard (weightlifter) =

New Zealand weightlifter (born 1957)

Personal information
- Nationality: New Zealand
- Born: 27 September 1957 (age 68) Samoa

Sport
- Sport: Weightlifting

Michael Bernard (born 27 September 1957) is a New Zealand former weightlifter. He competed in the men's light heavyweight event at the 1984 Summer Olympics.
