= Hidemi Miyashita =

Japanese weightlifter

Personal information
- Nationality: Japanese
- Born: 11 May 1957 (age 69)

Sport
- Sport: Weightlifting

Hidemi Miyashita (born 11 May 1957) is a Japanese weightlifter. He competed in the men's flyweight event at the 1984 Summer Olympics.
