= Tōkaichiba Station =

Tōkaichiba Station (十日市場駅) is the name of two train stations in Japan:

- Tōkaichiba Station (Kanagawa)
- Tōkaichiba Station (Yamanashi)
