= Dionisio Muñoz =

Spanish weightlifter

Personal information
- Nationality: Spanish
- Born: 29 March 1961 (age 63); Pamplona, Spain

Sport
- Sport: Weightlifting

Dionisio Muñoz (born 29 March 1961) is a Spanish weightlifter. He competed at the 1984 Summer Olympics and the 1988 Summer Olympics.
