= Rich Shanko =

American weightlifter

Personal information
- Nationality: American
- Born: January 11, 1960 (age 65); New Brunswick, New Jersey, United States

Sport
- Sport: Weightlifting

Rich Shanko (born January 11, 1960) is an American former weightlifter. He competed in the men's heavyweight I event at the 1984 Summer Olympics.
