= Erich Seidl =

Austrian weightlifter (born 1960)

Personal information
- Nationality: Austrian
- Born: 11 March 1960 (age 66)

Sport
- Sport: Weightlifting

Erich Seidl (born 11 March 1960) is an Austrian weightlifter. He competed in the men's middle heavyweight event at the 1984 Summer Olympics.
