= Giuseppe Lagrotteria =

Italian weightlifter

Personal information
- Nationality: Italian
- Born: 11 February 1959 (age 66); Monterosso Calabro, Italy

Sport
- Sport: Weightlifting

Giuseppe Lagrotteria (born 11 February 1959) is an Italian weightlifter. He competed in the men's light heavyweight event at the 1984 Summer Olympics.
