= Ma Wenguang =

Chinese weightlifter (born 1956)

Personal information
- Nationality: Chinese
- Born: 9 August 1956 (age 68)

Sport
- Sport: Weightlifting

Ma Wenguang (born 9 August 1956) is a Chinese weightlifter. He competed in the men's middle heavyweight event at the 1984 Summer Olympics.
