= Patrick Bassey =

Nigerian weightlifter (1957–2020)

Personal information
- Nationality: Nigerian
- Born: 20 November 1957
- Died: 12 November 2020 (aged 62)

Sport
- Sport: Weightlifting

Patrick Bassey (20 November 1957 – 12 November 2020) was a Nigerian weightlifter. He competed in the men's lightweight event at the 1984 Summer Olympics.
