= Peter Pinsent =

British weightlifter

Personal information
- Nationality: English
- Born: 25 November 1960 (age 65) Hillingdon, Greater London

Sport
- Club: South Ruislip LC
Medal record
weightlifting
Representing England
Commonwealth Games
| Silver medal – second place | 1982 Brisbane | 90kg middle-heavyweight |

Peter Pinsent (born 1960), is a male former weightlifter who competed for Great Britain and England.

== Weightlifting career ==
Pinsent represented Great Britain in the 1984 Summer Olympics.

He represented England and won a silver medal in the 90 kg middle-heavyweight division, at the 1982 Commonwealth Games in Brisbane, Queensland, Australia.

== Personal life ==
His brother Steve Pinsent is also a former Olympic weightlifter.
