= Sione Sialaoa =

Samoan weightlifter

Personal information
- Nationality: Samoan
- Born: 8 September 1956 (age 68)

Sport
- Sport: Weightlifting

Sione Sialaoa (born 8 September 1956) is a Samoan weightlifter. He competed in the men's heavyweight I event at the 1984 Summer Olympics.
