= Joaquín Valle (weightlifter) =

Spanish weightlifter (born 1954)

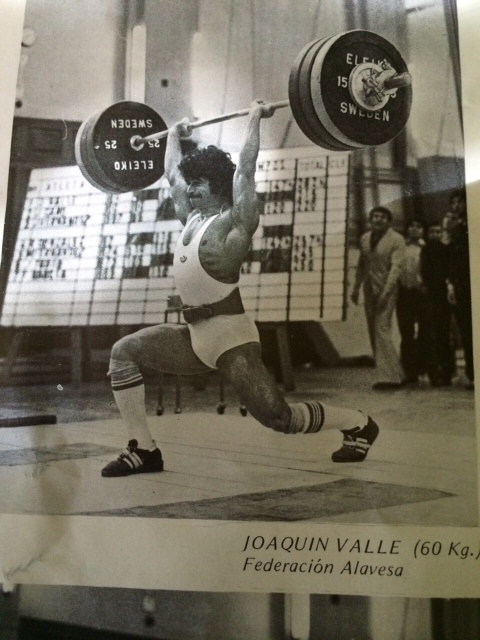

Personal information
- Full name: Joaquín Valle Montero
- Nationality: Spanish
- Born: 15 May 1954 (age 70); Málaga, Spain

Sport
- Sport: Weightlifting

Joaquín Valle Montero (Note: In this Spanish name, the first or paternal surname is Valle and the second or maternal family name is Montero.) (born 15 May 1954) is a Spanish weightlifter. He competed at the 1984 Summer Olympics and the 1988 Summer Olympics.
