= Lorenzo Orsini =

Australian weightlifter (born 1959)

Personal information
- Nationality: Australian
- Born: 31 October 1959 (age 66)

Sport
- Sport: Weightlifting
Medal record
Men's Weightlifting
Commonwealth Games
Bronze medal – third place	1982 Brisbane	Bantamweight

Lorenzo Orsini (born 31 October 1959) is an Australian former weightlifter. He competed in the men's bantamweight event at the 1980 Summer Olympics.
