= Tsurumi-Ichiba Station =

Railway station in Yokohama, Japan

KK28 Tsurumi-Ichiba Station 鶴見市場駅
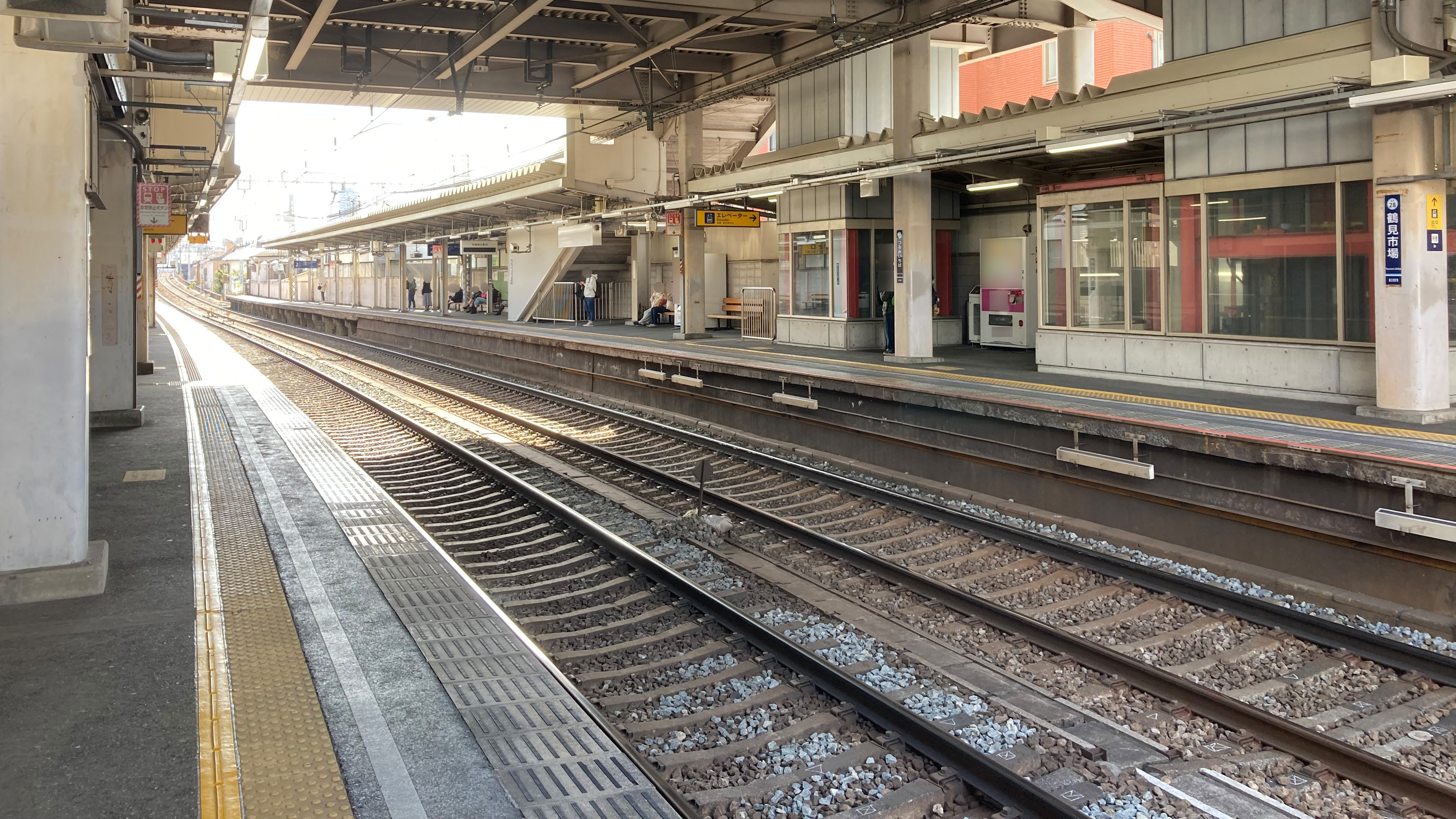
- Platforms of Tsurumi-Ichiba Station in March 2022

General information
- Location: Ichiba-Yamato-chō 7-1, Tsurumi-ku, Yokohama-shi, Kanagawa-ken 230-0025; Japan
- Coordinates: 35.5175°N 139.6863°E
- Elevation: 0 m (0 ft)
- System: Keikyū
- Operator: Keikyū
- Transit authority: Keikyū
- Line: Keikyū Main Line
- Distance: 13.8 km from Shinagawa
- Platforms: 2 side platforms
- Tracks: 2 tracks
- Bus routes: 2: Bus 16 (Loop) (Tsurumi station ~ Heian-itchome ~ Tsurumi station) Bus 18 (Tsurumi station ~ Yako station)
- Bus stands: Ichiba (for Bus 16): 1 Kumano-jinja-mae (for Bus 18): 2
- Bus operators: Yokohama Municipal Bus
- Connections: Bus stop

Construction
- Structure type: At-grade
- Accessible: Yes

Other information
- Station code: KK28
- Website: Official website

History
- Opened: December 24, 1905
- Former names: Ichiba (until 1927)

Passengers
- 2019: 21,572 daily

Services
Preceding station	Keikyu	Following station
Keikyū Tsurumi KK29 towards Uraga	Main Line Local	Hatchō-nawate KK27 towards Shinagawa
Location
- Location within Kanagawa Prefecture Location within Japan

Tsurumi-Ichiba Station (鶴見市場駅, Tsurumi-Ichiba-eki) is a passenger railway station located in Tsurumi-ku, Yokohama, Kanagawa Prefecture, Japan, operated by the private railway company Keikyū.

== Lines ==
Tsurumi-Ichiba Station is served by the Keikyū Main Line and is located 13.8 kilometers from the terminus of the line at Shinagawa Station in Tokyo.

== Station layout ==
The station consists of two ground-level opposed side platforms connected by an elevated station building built over the platforms and tracks.

== Station layout ==
1	■ Keikyū Main Line	for Yokohama, Zushi·Hayama, and Uraga
2	■ Keikyū Main Line	for Keikyū Kamata, Haneda Airport, and Shinagawa

== History ==
Tsurumi-Ichiba Station opened on December 24, 1905, as Ichiba Station (市場駅, Ichiba-eki). It was renamed to its present name in April 1927. A new station building was completed in April 1984, at which time the platforms were lengthened to accommodate 8-car trains.

Keikyū introduced station numbering to its stations on 21 October 2010; Tsurumi-Ichiba Station was assigned station number KK28.

== Passenger statistics ==
In fiscal 2019, the station was used by an average of 21,572 passengers daily.

The passenger figures for previous years are as shown below.

Fiscal year	daily average
2005	17,552
2010	18,154
2015	19,779

== Surrounding area ==
- Japan National Route 25
- old Tōkaidō highway
- Tsurumi River

== See also ==
- List of railway stations in Japan
