= Paulo Duarte (weightlifter) =

Portuguese weightlifter

Personal information
- Nationality: Portuguese
- Born: 14 December 1966 (age 58)

Sport
- Sport: Weightlifting

Paulo Duarte (born 14 December 1966) is a Portuguese weightlifter. He competed in the men's lightweight event at the 1988 Summer Olympics.
