= Vasile Groapă =

Romanian weightlifter (born 1955)

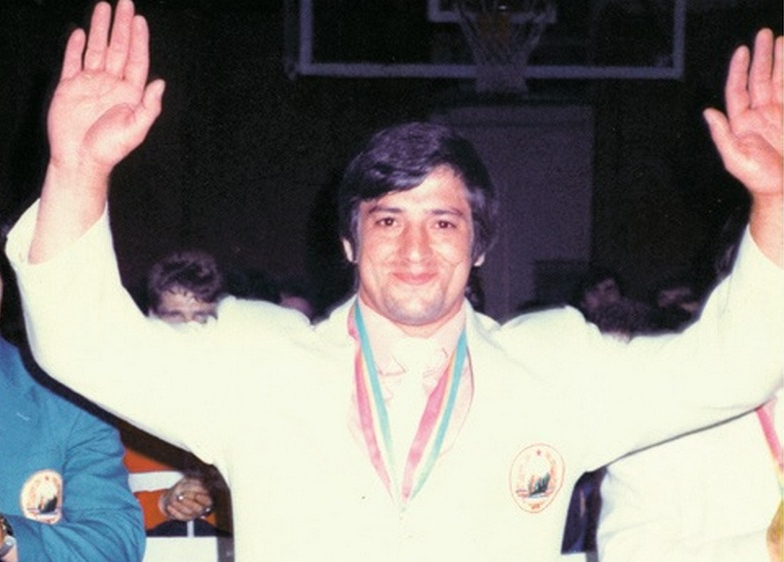
- Groapă at the 1984 Olympics

Personal information
- Born: 23 March 1955 (age 71) Cârlig, Romania
- Height: 175 cm (5 ft 9 in)

Sport
- Sport: Weightlifting
- Club: Steagul Rosu; CSA Steaua București
- Coached by: Gheorghe Piticaru; Stefan Achim
Medal record
Representing Romania
Olympic Games
Silver medal – second place	1984 Los Angeles	-100 kg

Vasile Groapă (born 23 March 1955) is a retired Romanian heavyweight weightlifter. He competed at the 1980 and 1984 Olympics and won a silver medal in 1984. He retired in 1987 after an injury sustained while training.
