= David Mercer (weightlifter) =

British weightlifter (born 1961)

Medal record

Representing United Kingdom

Men's Weightlifting

Olympic Games
Bronze medal – third place	1984 Los Angeles	-90 kg

David Mercer (born 16 April 1961 in Salford, United Kingdom) is a weightlifter from Great Britain.

He competed for Great Britain in the 1984 Summer Olympics held in Los Angeles, United States in the Middle-heavyweight (90 kg) event where he finished in third place. Four years later he competed at the 1988 Summer Olympics in Seoul but was unable to win a second medal, finishing in sixth place.
