= Karl-Heinz Radschinsky =

German weightlifter (born 1953)

Personal information
- Born: 23 July 1953 (age 72) Neumarkt in der Oberpfalz, Bavaria, West Germany
- Height: 1.65 m (5 ft 5 in)
- Weight: 75 kg (165 lb)

Sport
- Sport: Weightlifting
- Club: ASV Neumarkt
Medal record
Representing West Germany
Olympic Games
Gold medal – first place	1984 Los Angeles	Middleweight
European Championships
Bronze medal – third place	1980 Belgrad	Lightweight

Karl-Heinz Radschinsky (born 23 July 1953) is a retired German weightlifter. He won the gold medal in the middleweight class at the 1984 Summer Olympics in Los Angeles.
