= Michel Pietracupa =

Canadian weightlifter (born 1959)

Personal information
- Born: 12 July 1959 (age 67) Baie-Comeau, Quebec, Canada

Sport
- Sport: Weightlifting

Michel Pietracupa (born 12 July 1959) is a Canadian weightlifter. He competed in the men's middleweight event at the 1984 Summer Olympics.
