= Pete Fejeran =

Guam weightlifter

Personal information
- Born: January 20, 1971 (age 55)
- Height: 160 cm (5 ft 3 in)
- Weight: 67 kg (148 lb)

Sport
- Sport: Weightlifting

Pete Fejeran (born January 20, 1971) is a retired weightlifter from Guam. He placed 22nd in the lightweight division at the 1988 Olympics. He is the brother of Melissa Fejeran.
