= Steve Pinsent =

British weightlifter

Personal information
- Nationality: English
- Born: 5 March 1955 (age 71) Hillingdon, Greater London

Sport
- Club: South Ruislip LC
Medal record
weightlifting
Representing England
Commonwealth Games
| Bronze medal – third place | 1978 Edmonton | 75kg middleweight |
| Gold medal – first place | 1982 Brisbane | 75kg middleweight |

Stephen 'Steve' Pinsent (born 1955), is a male former weightlifter who competed for Great Britain and England.

== Weightlifting career ==
Pinsent represented Great Britain in the 1980 Summer Olympics and the 1984 Summer Olympics.

He represented England and won a bronze medal in the 75 kg middleweight division, at the 1978 Commonwealth Games in Edmonton, Alberta, Canada. Four years later he represented England and won a gold medal in the 75 kg middleweight division, at the 1982 Commonwealth Games in Brisbane, Queensland, Australia.

== Personal life ==
His brother Peter Pinsent is also a former Olympic weightlifter.
