= Dragomir Cioroslan =

United States of America Sport Executive Romanian born Olympic Athlete

Dragomir Cioroslan OLY
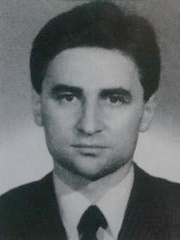

Personal information
- Born: 15 May 1954 (age 72) Cluj-Napoca, Romania
- Height: 170 cm (5 ft 7 in)

Sport
- Sport: Weightlifting
- Club: CSM Cluj; CSA Steaua București; Olimpia București
- Coached by: Stefan Iavorek
Medal record
Representing Romania
Olympic Games
Bronze medal – third place	1984 Los Angeles	-75 kg

Dragomir A. Cioroslan (born 15 May 1954) is a former three-time Olympian, Olympic bronze medalist middleweight weightlifter born in Romania. He has lived in the United States since 1990.

He competed at the 1976, 1980, and 1984 Olympics and won a bronze medal in 1984. Cioroslan won 10 national championships titles in his native Romania from 1974 to 1983. Besides weightlifting he participated in bodybuilding competitions. Between 1985 and 1990 he served as deputy secretary general and national coaching director of the Romanian Weightlifting Federation. In 1990 Cioroslan moved to the United States and worked as national resident program coach from 1990 to 2003. From 1993 to 2003 Cioroslan served as USA Weightlifting's national coach at World Championships, 1993–2003, Pan American Games coach in 1995 and 1999 as well as USA Weightlifting's head Olympic team coach at 1996 and 2000 Olympic Games. He served on the USOC Sport Science and Technology from 1993 to 2003.

In 2006 Cioroslan was named to the position of Director of International Strategies and Development at the United States Olympic and Paralympic Committee. In 1998 Cioroslan co-authored the book Banish Your Belly, Rodale Press, with Kenton Robinson. From 1998 to 2009 Cioroslan was a contributing writer to the Encyclopædia Britannica, Britannica Book of the Year.
