= Jouni Grönman =

Finnish weightlifter

Personal information
- Nationality: Finnish
- Born: Jouni Johannes Grönman; 17 May 1962 (age 64) Pori, Satakunta, Finland
- Height: 1.60 m (5 ft 3 in)
- Weight: 60–75 kg (132–165 lb)

Sport
- Country: Finland
- Sport: Weightlifting
- Event: Lightweight
- Club: Puntti-Karhut, Pori
Medal record
Men's weightlifting
Representing Finland
Olympic Games
Bronze medal – third place	1984 Los Angeles	-67.5 kg
European Championships
Silver medal – second place	1984 Vitoria-Gasteiz	-67.5 kg

Jouni Johannes Grönman (born 17 May 1962), is a Finnish former weightlifter who competed at four Olympic Games, and won a bronze medal at the 1984 Summer Olympics in Los Angeles.

Grönman was born and trained in Pori, on the west coast of Finland.

A lightweight, he was a 15-time Finnish champion and won five Nordic titles. He started competing internationally as a weightlifter in 1983, placing fifth at the European Championships, and sixth at the World Championships. He won a silver medal at the 1984 European Championships, which was followed soon after by his first appearance in the Olympics.

== Olympic career ==
Due to the Soviet boycott, the top four placed lifters from the World Championships were absent for the 1984 Olympics, so Grönman came into the event as one of the favorites. He had the final lift of the competition, and although he got bar to his shoulders was unable to get it over his head to China's Yao Jingyuan. Instead he won a bronze medal from his earlier 312.5 kg effort, the same total of the silver medalist Andrei Socaci, who got second place on account of his body weight being less than Grönman's. It was only the second Olympics that Finland won a weightlifting medal, in fact he and heavyweight lifter Pekka Niemi's bronze medals were the first since Kaarlo Kangasniemi won gold in 1968.

He represented Finland in a further three Olympics. In 1988 he did not register a successful lift, but in 1992 he finished in fifth position overall. His final appearance came in 1996 and he was the oldest competitor in the field at the age of 34. He finished in 17th position.
