= Petre Becheru =

Romanian weightlifter (born 1960)

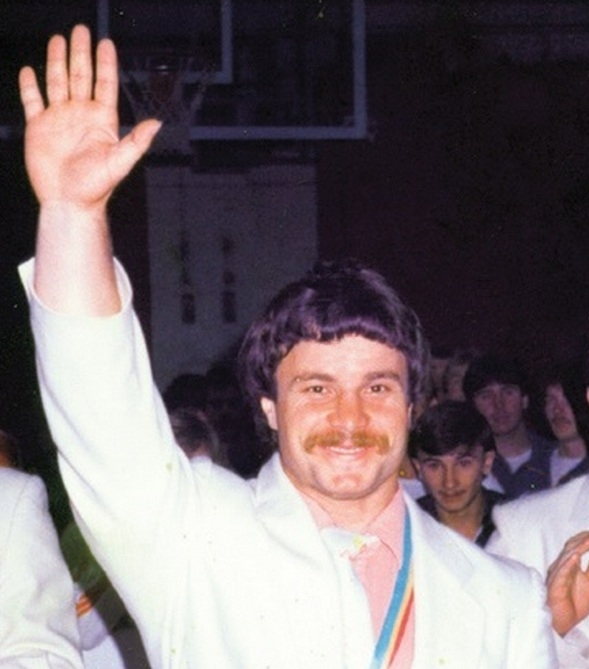
- Becheru at the 1984 Olympics

Personal information
- Born: 16 May 1960 (age 66) Drăgănești-Vlașca, Romania
- Height: 164 cm (5 ft 5 in)

Sport
- Sport: Weightlifting
- Club: CSA Steaua București
- Coached by: Silviu Cazan
Medal record
Men's weightlifting
Representing Romania
Olympic Games
Gold medal – first place	1984 Los Angeles	-82.5 kg
European Championships
Bronze medal – third place	1987 Reims	-82.5 kg

Petre Becheru (born 16 May 1960) is a retired Romanian weightlifter. He won a gold medal at the 1984 Olympics and placed third at the 1987 European Championships.
