= Zhou Peishun =

Chinese weightlifter

Medal record

Men's Weightlifting

Olympic Games
Silver medal – second place	1984 Los Angeles	52 kg

Zhou Peishun (Chinese: 周培顺; born 8 March 1962) is a former male Chinese weightlifter. He won a silver medal at 1984 Olympic Games in men's 52 kg.
