= Zeng Guoqiang =

Chinese weightlifter

Medal record

Men's Weightlifting

Olympic Games
Gold medal – first place	1984 Los Angeles	52 kg

Zeng Guoqiang (Chinese: 曾国强; born 18 March 1965 in Dongguan, Guangdong) is a Male Chinese weightlifter. By winning the 52 kg class weightlifting at the 23rd Olympic Games in 1984, he became China's first Olympic gold medalist in weightlifting.

== Major performances ==
- 1983 World Youth Championships - 1st 52 kg
- 1984 Los Angeles Olympic Games - 1st 52 kg
- 1984 World Championships - 1st 52 kg C&J & total
- 1984 Asian Championships - 1st 52 kg snatch, C&J & total
- 1985 World Championships - 2nd 52 kg C&J & total

== Honors ==
- 1984 - Named Best Athlete at the 16th Asian Championships
