= Petre Dumitru =

Romanian weightlifter

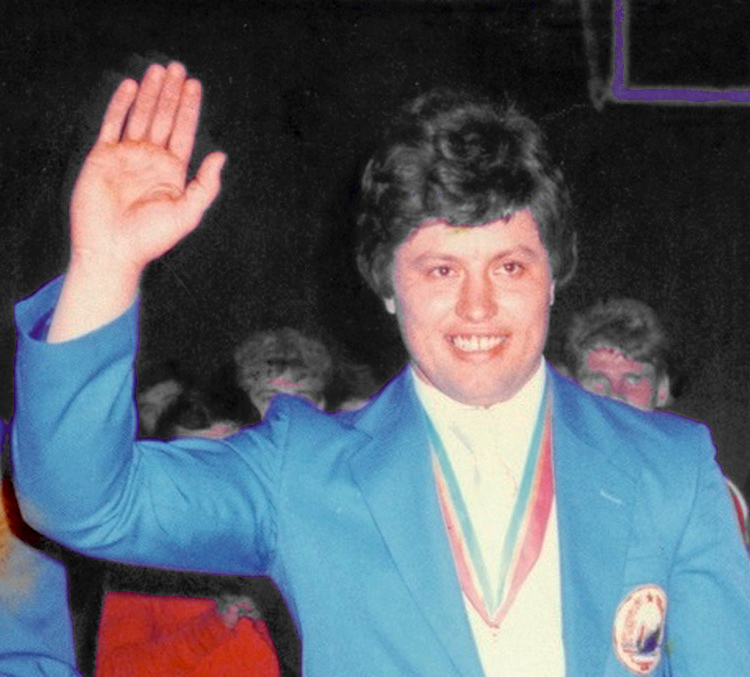
- Dumitru at the 1984 Olympics

Personal information
- Born: 11 November 1957 (age 68) Slobozia, Romania
- Height: 173 cm (5 ft 8 in)

Sport
- Sport: Weightlifting
Medal record
Representing Romania
Olympic Games
Silver medal – second place	1984 Los Angeles	-90 kg

Petre Dumitru (born 11 November 1957) is a retired Romanian weightlifter. He competed at the 1980 and 1984 Olympics and won a silver medal in 1984.
