= Pekka Niemi (weightlifter) =

Finnish weightlifter (born 1952)

Personal information
- Born: 14 November 1952 (age 73) Lohtaja, Finland
- Height: 174 cm (5 ft 9 in)
- Weight: 83–104 kg (183–229 lb)

Sport
- Sport: Weightlifting
Medal record
Representing Finland
Olympic Games
Bronze medal – third place	1984 Los Angeles	Heavyweight I

Pekka Kalevi Niemi (born 14 November 1952) is a retired Finnish heavyweight weightlifter who competed at the 1980 and 1984 Olympics; he finished tenth in 1980 and won a bronze medal in 1984.

Niemi took part in every major international competition between 1977 and 1984, with the best results of fifth-seventh place at the European championships of 1983–84. He did not expect to medal at the 1984 Olympics, and after finishing his attempts went for sightseeing. The officials delayed the award ceremony by a few hours trying to find him, but failed, and went ahead with the empty bronze medal platform. Niemi received his medal next day. Domestically he won 11 consecutive Finnish titles in 1977–88. After retiring from competitions he worked as a weightlifting coach and trained the Finnish weightlifting team in 1995–2001. Starting from 1985 he was also a member of the Athlete's Commission at the Finnish Olympic Committee. He later worked as a special education teacher at the Pirkanmaa Educational Consortium in Tampere. Pekka Niemi has two daughters: Milka Johanna Tulinen and Mona Koskimaa. Pekka niemi is now married to Tuija Niemi who is also a multiple Finnish championship winner in weightlifting. Pekka Niemi has three grandchildren. His first grandchild is Milka Tulinen's son Uno Tulinen. The second one is Mona Koskimaa's child named Oskari Koskimaa and Milka Tulinens second child named Liekki Tulinen.
