= Norberto Oberburger =

Italian weightlifter (born 1960)

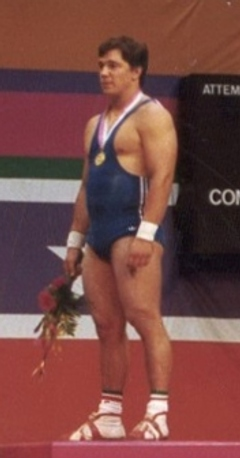
- Oberburger at the 1984 Olympics

Personal information
- Born: 1 December 1960 (age 65) Merano, Italy
- Height: 182 cm (6 ft 0 in)
- Weight: 112 kg (247 lb)

Sport
- Sport: Weightlifting
- Club: Atletic Club Merano
Medal record
Representing Italy
Olympic Games
| Gold medal – first place | 1984 Los Angeles | -110 kg |
World Championships
| Bronze medal – third place | 1985 Södertälje | -110 kg |
European Championships
| Silver medal – second place | 1984 Vittorio | -110 kg |
| Bronze medal – third place | 1986 Karl-Marx-Stadt | -110 kg |

Norberto Oberburger (born 1 December 1960) is an Italian retired weightlifter who won a gold medal at 1984 Summer Olympics in the 110 kilogram weight class.

== Biography ==
In 1984 he placed second to Yury Zakharevich at the European Championships, but won a gold medal at the Los Angeles Olympics, which were boycotted by the Soviet Union. Oberburger then won bronze medals at the 1985 world and 1986 European championships, both times behind Zakharevich.

== Achievements ==
| Year | Competition | Venue | Position | Event | Performance | Notes |
|---|---|---|---|---|---|---|
| 1980 | Olympic Games | (Soviet Union) Moscow | 10th | Men's 90 kg | 315.0 kg | |
| 1984 | Olympic Games | (United States) Los Angeles | 1st | Men's 110 kg | 390.0 kg | |
| 1988 | Olympic Games | (South Korea) Seoul | 6th | Men's 110 kg | 415.0 kg | |
| 1992 | Olympic Games | (Spain) Barcelona | 10th | Men's 110 kg | 375.0 kg | |
