= Lai Runming =

Chinese weightlifter (born 1963)

Medal record

Men's Weightlifting

Olympic Games
Silver medal – second place	1984 Los Angeles	56 kg

Lai Runming (Chinese: 赖润明; 5 May 1963 - ) is a former male Chinese weightlifter. He won a silver medal at 1984 Olympic Games in Men's 56 kg.
