= Chen Weiqiang =

Chinese weightlifter (born 1958)

Medal record

Men's Weightlifting

Olympic Games
Gold medal – first place	1984 Los Angeles	60 kg

Chen Weiqiang (Chinese: 陈伟强; born 1958 in Dongguan, Guangdong) is a male Chinese weightlifter. He began training in a sports school in the provincial Gymnasium in 1972. Two years later, he joined the provincial team. He won a gold medal at 1984 Los Angeles.
