= Robert Kabbas =

Australian weightlifter (born 1955)

Personal information
- Born: 15 March 1955 (age 71)
Medal record
Men's Weightlifting
Olympic Games
Silver medal – second place	1984 Los Angeles	Light heavyweight
Commonwealth Games
Gold medal – first place	1978 Edmonton	Light heavyweight
Gold medal – first place	1982 Brisbane	Middle heavyweight
Silver medal – second place	1986 Edinburgh	Light heavyweight

Robert Kabbas (born 15 March 1955, in Alexandria, Egypt) is an Australian retired weightlifter, who won the silver medal in the Lightheavyweight (82.5 kg) category at the 1984 Summer Olympics.

Kabbas has been one of the most successful weightlifters to represent Australia at the Commonwealth Games. He went to three Olympic Games: Montreal 1976, Moscow 1980 and Los Angeles in 1984. He was the first of only two Australian weightlifters to compete at three Olympics. The LA Olympics were one of the highlights of Kabbas' career as he lifted a personal best of 342.5 kg and set a Commonwealth record.

Winning medals at three Commonwealth Games: Edmonton 1978 (Gold Medal), Brisbane 1982 (Gold Medal) and Edinburgh 1986 (Silver Medal), he was also the best weightlifter across all weight classes at Edmonton. Kabbas remains in the sport, still coaching and developing athletes.

Kabbas became president of the Australian Weightlifting Federation in October 2007.
