= Ștefan Tașnadi =

Romanian weightlifter

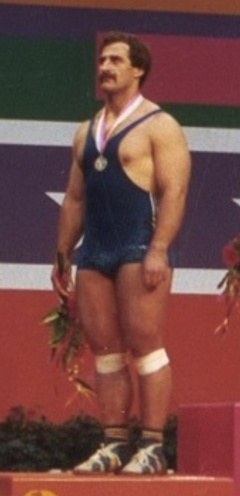
- Tasnadi at the 1984 Olympics

Personal information
- Born: 21 March 1953 Cluj, Romania
- Died: 28 February 2018 (aged 64)
- Height: 183 cm (6 ft 0 in)
- Weight: 110 kg (243 lb)

Sport
- Sport: Weightlifting
- Club: AS Clujana
Medal record
Representing Romania
Olympic Games
| Silver medal – second place | 1984 Los Angeles | 110 kg |

Ștefan Tașnadi (Hungarian: István Tasnádi, 21 March 1953 – 28 February 2018) was a Romanian heavyweight weightlifter who competed in the 1980 and 1984 Olympics winning a silver medal in 1984.

Tașnadi took up lifting in 1970 at a sports school and from 1976 to 1984 was a member of the national team. He retired in 1984 to become a weightlifting coach at AS Clujana and CS Universitatea Cluj. He also served as an international weightlifting referee.
