= Choji Taira =

Japanese weightlifter

Personal information
- Nationality: Japanese
- Born: 30 November 1960 (age 64)
- Height: 163 cm (5 ft 4 in)
- Weight: 70 kg (154 lb)

Sport
- Sport: Weightlifting

Choji Taira (Japanese: 平良朝治, born 30 November 1960) is a Japanese weightlifter. He competed at the 1984 Summer Olympics and the 1988 Summer Olympics.
