= Takashi Ichiba =

Japanese weightlifter

Personal information
- Nationality: Japanese
- Born: 13 December 1960 (age 64)

Sport
- Sport: Weightlifting

Takashi Ichiba (born 13 December 1960) is a Japanese weightlifter. He competed at the 1984 Summer Olympics and the 1988 Summer Olympics.
