= Wu Shude =

Chinese weightlifter (born 1959)

Medal record

Men's Weightlifting

Olympic Games
Gold medal – first place	1984 Los Angeles	56 kg

Wu Shude (Chinese: 吴数德; born 18 September 1959) is a male Chinese weightlifter. He won a gold medal at 1984 Olympic Games in men's 56 kg. He is 158 centimeters tall.
