= Tsai Wen-yee =

Taiwanese weightlifter

Personal information
- Born: September 29, 1956 (age 69)
Medal record
Men's Weightlifting
Representing Chinese Taipei
Olympic Games
| Bronze medal – third place | 1984 Los Angeles | 60 Kg |

Tsai Wen-yee (Chinese: 蔡溫義; pinyin: Cài Wēnyì; born 29 September 1956) is a Taiwanese weightlifter. He won a Bronze medal in the 60 kg class at the 1984 Summer Olympics in Los Angeles.
