= Gersten Pavilion =

Sports arena at Loyola Marymount University

- Hank's House
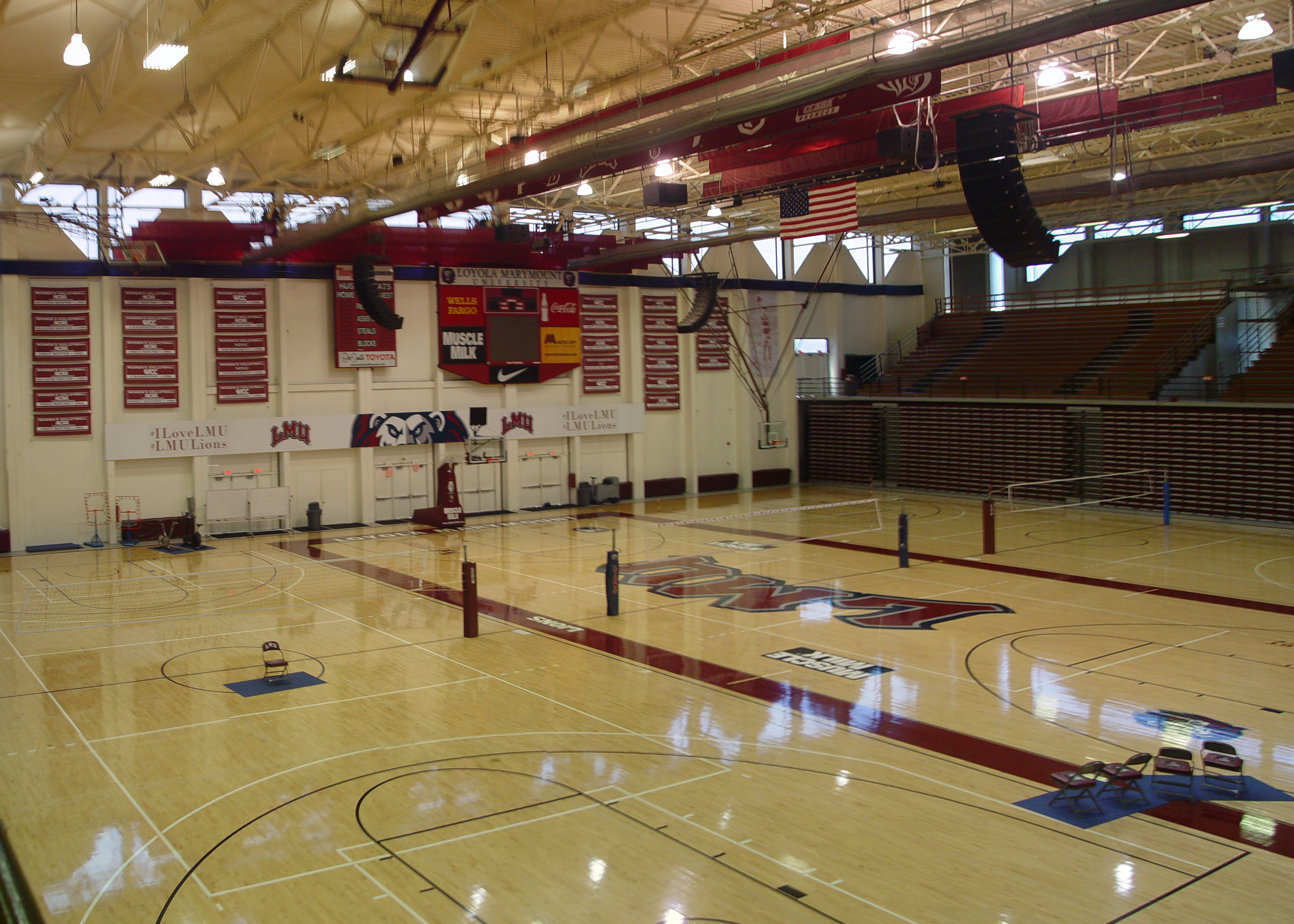
- Interactive map of Gersten Pavilion
- Location: One LMU Drive; Los Angeles, CA 90045
- Coordinates: 33°58′3″N 118°24′56″W
- Owner: Loyola Marymount University
- Operator: Loyola Marymount University
- Capacity: 3,900 (2016)
- Surface: Hardwood

Construction
- Opened: January 15, 1981
- Cost: $4.2 million ($14.9 million in 2025 dollars)
- Architect: John Aleksich

Tenants
- Loyola Marymount Lions (men's and women's basketball, women's volleyball)

The Gersten Pavilion is a 3,900-seat multi-purpose arena in Los Angeles, California. It is the home of the Loyola Marymount University Lions. It was built in 1981 and has been used for home games by the university's men's basketball, women's basketball, and volleyball teams since January 1982.

It was also the part-time practice home for the Los Angeles Lakers. It was the site for the weightlifting competition for the 1984 Summer Olympics. The arena will forever be linked to the events that transpired on March 4, 1990, when LMU star Hank Gathers collapsed on the court from cardiomyopathy during a West Coast Conference men's basketball tournament game and later died. The tourney was promptly suspended and LMU was awarded the NCAA bid based on their regular season title. The facility also hosted the WCC tournament in 1997.

The arena is known among LMU alumni as "Hank's House" in honor of Gathers and the phrase "This is Hank's House" is recited before the start of every men's basketball game.

== See also ==
- List of NCAA Division I basketball arenas
