= List of Commonwealth Games medallists in weightlifting =

This is the complete list of Commonwealth Games medallists in weightlifting from 1950 to 2014.

== Men's ==
=== Flyweight ===
Event	Gold		Silver		Bronze	
1970 - Overall	George Vassiliadis (AUS)	290	Abdul Ghafoor (PAK)	287.5	John McNiven (SCO)	265
1974 - Overall	Precious McKenzie (ENG)	215	Anil Mondal (IND)	200	John McNiven (SCO)	192.5
1978 - Overall	Ekambaram Karunakaran (IND)	205	Charlie Revolta (SCO)	197.5	Roger Crabtree (AUS)	190
1982 - Overall	Nick Voukelatos (AUS)	207.5	Grunadan Kambiah (IND)	200	Lawrence Tom (NGR)	192.5
1986 - Overall	Greg Hayman (AUS)	212.5	Charlie Revolta (SCO)	185	Alan Ogilvie (SCO)	177.5
1990 - Snatch	Raghavan Chanderasekaran (IND)	105	Velu Govindraj (IND)	95	Greg Hayman (AUS)	90
1990 - Clean and Jerk	Raghavan Chanderasekaran (IND)	127.5	Greg Hayman (AUS)	117.5	Velu Govindraj (IND)	117.5
1990 - Overall	Raghavan Chanderasekaran (IND)	232.5	Velu Govindraj (IND)	212.5	Greg Hayman (AUS)	207.5
1994 - Snatch	Murgesan Veerasamy (IND)	105	Badathala Adisekhar (IND)	105	François Lagacé (CAN)	105
1994 - Clean and Jerk	Badathala Adisekhar (IND)	132.5	Matin Guntali (MAS)	130	Murgesan Veerasamy (IND)	127.5
1994 - Overall	Badathala Adisekhar (IND)	237.5	Murgesan Veerasamy (IND)	232.5	François Lagacé (CAN)	227.5

=== Bantamweight ===
Event	Gold		Silver		Bronze	
1950 - Overall	(Federation of Malaya) Tho Fook Hung (MAL)	655 lb	Rosaire Smith (CAN)	615 lb	Keith Caple (AUS)	600 lb
1954 - Overall	Maurice Megennis (ENG)	281	Frank Cope (ENG)	276.5	Keith Caple (AUS)	274
1958 - Overall	Reginald Gaffley (SAF)	299	Ronald Brownbill (ENG)	285.5	Marcel Gosselin (CAN)	274
1962 - Overall	Chua Phung Kim (SIN)	322	Allen Salter (CAN)	310.5	Martin Dias (BGU)	306
1966 - Overall	Precious McKenzie (ENG)	319.5	Martin Dias (GUY)	307	Chun Hon Chan (CAN)	304.5
1970 - Overall	Precious McKenzie (ENG)	335	Tony Phillips (BAR)	317.5	Tung Chye Hong (SIN)	302.5
1974 - Overall	Michael Adams (AUS)	222.5	Yves Carignan (CAN)	212.5	Shanmug Velliswamy (IND)	212.5
1978 - Overall	Precious McKenzie (NZL)	220	Tamil Selvan (IND)	220	Jeffrey Bryce (WAL)	215
1982 - Overall	Geoff Laws (ENG)	235	Bijay Kumar Satpathy (IND)	227.5	Lorenzo Orsini (AUS)	222.5
1986 - Overall	Nick Voukelatos (AUS)	245	Clayton Chelley (NZL)	217.5	Teo Yong Joo (SIN)	215
1990 - Snatch	Ponnuswamy Rangaswamy (IND)	110	Alan Ogilvie (SCO)	107.5	Denis Aumais (CAN)	102.5
1990 - Clean and Jerk	Ponnuswamy Rangaswamy (IND)	137.5	Gopal Maruthachelam (IND)	125	Alan Ogilvie (SCO)	122.5
1990 - Overall	Ponnuswamy Rangaswamy (IND)	247.5	Alan Ogilvie (SCO)	230	Gopal Maruthachelam (IND)	227.5
1994 - Snatch	Marcus Stephen (NRU)	115	Raghavan Chanderasekaran (IND)	110	Denis Aumais (CAN)	107.5
1994 - Clean and Jerk	Marcus Stephen (NRU)	147.5	Raghavan Chanderasekaran (IND)	145	Ben Devonshire (ENG)	132.5
1994 - Overall	Marcus Stephen (NRU)	262.5	Raghavan Chanderasekaran (IND)	255	Denis Aumais (CAN)	237.5
1998 - Snatch	Mehmet Yağcı (AUS)	107.5 kg	Arumugam K. Pandian (IND)	107.5 kg	Matin Guntali (MAS)	105 kg
1998 - Clean and Jerk	Dharmaraj Wilson (IND)	140 kg	Arumugam K. Pandian (IND)	137.5 kg	Matin Guntali (MAS)	135 kg
1998 - Overall	Arumugam K. Pandian (IND)	245 kg	Dharmaraj Wilson (IND)	242.5 kg	Matin Guntali (MAS)	240 kg
2002 - Snatch	Amirul Hamizan Ibrahim (MAS)	115.0 kg	Thandava Murthy Muthu (IND)	112.5 kg	Mohamed Faizal Baharom (MAS)	110.0 kg
2002 - Clean and Jerk	Amirul Hamizan Ibrahim (MAS)	145.0 kg	Vicky Batta (IND)	135.0 kg	Thandava Murthy Muthu (IND)	132.5 kg
2002 - Overall	Amirul Hamizan Ibrahim (MAS)	260.0 kg	Thandava Murthy Muthu (IND)	245.0 k	Vicky Batta (IND)	242.5 kg
2006 - Overall	Mohamed Faizal Baharom (MAS)		Vicky Batta (IND)		Matin Guntali (MAS)	
2010 - Overall	Sukhen Dey (IND)		Zulhelmi Pisol (MAS)		Ganesh Mali (IND)	
2014 - Overall	Amirul Hamizan Ibrahim (MAS)		Sukhen Dey (IND)		Valluri Srinivasa Rao (IND)	
2018 - Overall	Azroy Hazalwafie (MAS)	261 kg	Gururaja (IND)	249 kg	Chaturanga Lakmal (SRI)	248 kg

=== Featherweight ===
Event	Gold		Silver		Bronze	
1950 - Overall	(Federation of Malaya) Koh Eng Tong (MAL)	685 lb	Julian Creus (ENG)	670 lb	(South Africa) Barry Engelbrecht (SAF)	640 lb
1954 - Overall	Rodney Wilkes (TRI)	313	Jules Sylvain (CAN)	297	Ron Jenkins (WAL)	279
1958 - Overall	Tan Ser Cher (SIN)	310.5	Chung Kum Weng (MAS)	306	Rodney Wilkes (TRI)	304
1962 - Overall	George Newton (ENG)	326.5	Ieuan Owen (WAL)	292.5	Cheong Kam Hong (Malaya)	281
1966 - Overall	Chung Kum Weng (WAL)	337	Mahon Ghosh (IND)	334.5	Allen Salter (CAN)	324.5
1970 - Overall	Gerald Perrin (ENG)	342.5	Chua Phung Kim (SIN)	340	Alexander Navis (IND)	335
1974 - Overall	George Vassiliadis (AUS)	237.5	Gerald Hay (AUS)	235	Brian Duffy (NZL)	232.5
1978 - Overall	Michael Mercier (CAN)	237.5	Ivan Katz (AUS)	235	Darrell Schultz (CAN)	230
1982 - Overall	Dean Willey (ENG)	267.5	Tamil Selvan (IND)	245	Chua Koon Siong (SIN)	242.5
1986 - Overall	Ray Williams (WAL)	252.5	David Lowenstein (AUS)	250	Jeffrey Bryce (WAL)	235
1990 - Snatch	Marcus Stephen (NRU)	112.5	Parvesh Chander Sharma (IND)	112.5	Kumarasan Sudalaimani (IND)	110
1990 - Clean and Jerk	Parvesh Chander Sharma (IND)	145	Marcus Stephen (NRU)	142.5	Kumarasan Sudalaimani (IND)	142.5
1990 - Overall	Parvesh Chander Sharma (IND)	257.5	Marcus Stephen (NRU)	255	Kumarasan Sudalaimani (IND)	252.5
1994 - Snatch	Najite Ogbogu (NGR)	125	Sevdalin Marinov (AUS)	125	Oliver Toby (NGR)	120
1994 - Clean and Jerk	Oliver Toby (NGR)	152.5	Sevdalin Marinov (AUS)	152.5	Najite Ogbogu (NGR)	150
1994 - Overall	Sevdalin Marinov (AUS)	277.5	Najite Ogbogu (NGR)	275	Oliver Toby (NGR)	272.5
1998 - Snatch	Marcus Stephen (NRU)	125 kg	Yurik Sarkisyan (AUS)	125 kg	Ganapathy Gnanasekar (IND)	117.5 kg
1998 - Clean and Jerk	Marcus Stephen (NRU)	167.5 kg	Yurik Sarkisyan (AUS)	157.5 kg	Arun Murugesan (IND)	155 kg
1998 - Overall	Marcus Stephen (NRU)	292.5 kg	Yurik Sarkisyan (AUS)	282.5 kg	Arun Murugesan (IND)	272.5 kg
2002 - Snatch	Yurik Sarkisyan (AUS)	125.0 kg	Marcus Stephen (NRU)	117.5 kg	Roswadi Rashid (MAS)	115.0 kg
2002 - Clean and Jerk	Yurik Sarkisyan (AUS)	152.5 kg	Marcus Stephen (NRU)	147.5 kg	Terry Hughes (NZL)	135.0 kg
2002 - Overall	Yurik Sarkisyan (AUS)	277.5 kg	Marcus Stephen (NRU)	265.0 kg	Terry Hughes (NZL)	245.0 kg
2006 - Overall	Chinthana Vidanage (SRI)		Arun Murugesan (IND)		Roswadi Rashid (MAS)	
2010 - Overall	Aricco Jumitih (MAS)		Naharudin Mahayudin (MAS)		Sudesh Peiris (SRI)	
2014 - Overall	Dimitris Minasidis (CYP)		Sudesh Peiris (SRI)		Vaipava Ioane (SAM)	
2018 - Overall	Muhamad Aznil Bidin (MAS)	288 kg	Morea Baru (PNG)	286 kg	Talha Talib (PAK)	283 kg

=== Lightweight ===
Event	Gold		Silver		Bronze	
1950 - Overall	Jim Halliday (ENG)	760 lb	(Federation of Malaya) Thong Saw Pak (MAL)	735 lb	Vern Barberis (AUS)	730 lb
1954 - Overall	Vern Barberis (AUS)	347	George Nicholls (BAR)	344.5	Jan Pieterse (SAF)	333
1958 - Overall	Tan Howe Liang (SIN)	358	Harry Webber (SAF)	340	Ben Helfgott (ENG)	340
1962 - Overall	Carlton Goring (ENG)	351.5	Alan Oshyer (AUS)	340	Jimmy Moir (SCO)	340
1966 - Overall	Hugo Gittens (TTO)	367	George Newton (ENG)	354.5	Ieuan Owen (WAL)	349.5
1970 - Overall	George Newton (ENG)	372.5	Ieuan Owen (WAL)	355	Bruce Cameron (NZL)	335
1974 - Overall	George Newton (ENG)	260	Ieuan Owen (WAL)	255	Bruce Cameron (NZL)	252.5
1978 - Overall	Bill Stellios (AUS)	272.5	Adrian Kebbe (AUS)	267.5	Phillip Sue (NZL)	262.5
1982 - Overall	Dave Morgan (WAL)	295	Bill Stellios (AUS)	285	Patrick Bassey (NGR)	277.5
1986 - Overall	Dean Willey (ENG)	315	Ron Laycock (AUS)	307.5	Langis Côté (CAN)	290
1990 - Snatch	Paramjit Sharma (IND)	130	Lawrence Iquaibom (NGR)	130	Mark Blair (AUS)	127.5
1990 - Clean and Jerk	Paramjit Sharma (IND)	165	Lawrence Iquaibom (NGR)	160	Mark Roach (WAL)	155
1990 - Overall	Paramjit Sharma (IND)	295	Lawrence Iquaibom (NGR)	290	Mark Roach (WAL)	280
1994 - Snatch	Lawal Riliwan (NGR)	132.5	Stewart Cruickshank (ENG)	132.5	Mojisola Oluwa (NGR)	130
1994 - Clean and Jerk	Mojisola Oluwa (NGR)	165	Satheesha Rai (IND)	165	Stewart Cruickshank (ENG)	160
1994 - Overall	Mojisola Oluwa (NGR)	295	Satheesha Rai (IND)	292.5	Stewart Cruickshank (ENG)	292.5
1998 - Snatch	Sébastien Groulx (CAN)	130 kg	Stewart Cruickshank (ENG)	130 kg	Tony Morgan (WAL)	130 kg
1998 - Clean and Jerk	Mohd Hidayat Hamidon (MAS)	167.5 kg	Sébastien Groulx (CAN)	167.5 kg	G. Vadivelu (IND)	135.5 kg
1998 - Overall	Sébastien Groulx (CAN)	297.5 kg	Mohd Hidayat Hamidon (MAS)	295 kg	Sandeep Kumar (IND)	285 kg
2002 - Snatch	Tientchy Dabaya (CMR)	140.0 kg	Muhammed Irfan (PAK)	140.5 kg	Sudhir Kumar Chitradurga (IND)	135.0 kg
2002 - Clean and Jerk	Tientchy Dabaya (CMR)	170.0 kg	Muhammed Irfan (PAK)	170.0 kg	Mohd Hidayat Hamidon (MAS)	167.5 kg
2002 - Overall	Tientchy Dabaya (CMR)	310.0 kg	Muhammed Irfan (PAK)	310.0 kg	Stewart Cruickshank (ENG)	297.5 kg
2006 - Overall	Ben Turner (AUS)		Mohd Hidayat Hamidon (MAS)		Sudhir Kumar Chitradurga (IND)	
2010 - Overall	Katulu Ravi Kumar (IND)		Chinthana Vidanage (SRI)		Mohd Mansor (MAS)	
2014 - Overall	Mohd Mansor (MAS)		Yinka Ayenuwa (NGR)		Omkar Otari (IND)	
2018 - Overall	Gareth Evans (WAL)	299 kg	Indika Dissanayake (SRI)	297 kg	Deepak Lather (IND)	295 kg

=== Middleweight ===
Event	Gold		Silver		Bronze	
1950 - Overall	Gerry Gratton (CAN)	795 lb	Tony George (NZL)	740 lb	Fred Giffin (AUS)	720 lb
1954 - Overall	Jim Halliday (ENG)	362.5	Lionel de Freitas (TRI)	342	Julius Park (BGU)	338
1958 - Overall	Blair Blenman (BAR)	360.5	Winston McArthur (BGU)	360.5	Adrien Gilbert (CAN)	356
1962 - Overall	Tan Howe Liang (SIN)	390	Pierre St.-Jean (CAN)	376	Horace Johnson (WAL)	372
1966 - Overall	Pierre St.-Jean (CAN)	404.5	Horace Johnson (WAL)	382	Russell Perry (AUS)	372
1970 - Overall	Russell Perry (AUS)	412.5	Tony Ebert (NZL)	402.5	Pierre St.-Jean (CAN)	400
1974 - Overall	Tony Ebert (NZL)	275	Stanley Bailey (TRI)	275	Robert Wrench (WAL)	270
1978 - Overall	Sam Castiglione (AUS)	300	Newton Burrowes (ENG)	290	Steve Pinsent (ENG)	290
1982 - Overall	Steve Pinsent (ENG)	312.5	Tony Pignone (AUS)	305	Jacques Demers (CAN)	302.5
1986 - Overall	Bill Stellios (AUS)	302.5	Louis Payer (CAN)	300	Neil Taylor (WAL)	270
1990 - Snatch	Karnadhar Mondal (IND)	135	Karl Jones (WAL)	135	Ron Laycock (AUS)	132.5
1990 - Clean and Jerk	Ron Laycock (AUS)	177.5	Karnadhar Mondal (IND)	170	Damian Brown (AUS)	167.5
1990 - Overall	Ron Laycock (AUS)	310	Karnadhar Mondal (IND)	305	Benoît Gagné (CAN)	292.5
1994 - Snatch	Dave Morgan (WAL)	147.5	Serge Tremblay (CAN)	145	Damian Brown (AUS)	142.5
1994 - Clean and Jerk	Damian Brown (AUS)	182.5	Dave Morgan (WAL)	180	Serge Tremblay (CAN)	172.5
1994 - Overall	Dave Morgan (WAL)	327.5	Damian Brown (AUS)	325	Serge Tremblay (CAN)	317.5
1998 - Snatch	Satheesha Rai (IND)	147.5 kg	Dave Morgan (WAL)	145 kg	Damian Brown (AUS)	140 kg
1998 - Clean and Jerk	Damian Brown (AUS)	187.5 kg	Satheesha Rai (IND)	147.5 kg	Alain Bilodeau (CAN)	167.5 kg
1998 - Overall	Damian Brown (AUS)	327.5 kg	Satheesha Rai (IND)	322.5 kg	Alain Bilodeau (CAN)	305 kg
2002 - Snatch	Damian Brown (AUS)	147.5 kg	Dave Morgan (WAL)	145.0 kg	Craig Blythman (AUS)	135.0 kg
2002 - Clean and Jerk	Dave Morgan (WAL)	160.0 kg	Renos Doweiya (NRU)	160.0 kg	Scott McCarthy (CAN)	157.5 kg
2002 - Overall	Dave Morgan (WAL)	305.0 kg	Renos Doweiya (NRU)	290.0 kg	Scott McCarthy (CAN)	290.0 kg
2006 - Overall	Majeti Fetrie (GHA)		Mohammed Asdullah (IND)		Muhammad Irfan (PAK)	
2010 - Overall	Yukio Peter (NRU)		Ben Turner (AUS)		Sudhir Kumar Chitradurga (IND)	
2014 - Overall	Sathish Sivalingam (IND)		Katulu Ravi Kumar (IND)		François Etoundi (AUS)	
2018 - Overall	Sathish Sivalingam (IND)	317 kg	Jack Oliver (ENG)	312 kg	François Etoundi (AUS)	305 kg

=== Light heavyweight ===
Event	Gold		Silver		Bronze	
1950 - Overall	Jack Varaleau (CAN)	815 lb	(South Africa) Issy Bloomberg (SAF)	815 lb	(Federation of Malaya) Tan Kim Bee (MAL)	765 lb
1954 - Overall	Gerry Gratton (CAN)	403.5	Louis Greeff (SAF)	367	Tony George (NZL)	353.5
1958 - Overall	Phil Caira (SCO)	396.5	Sylvanus Blackman (BAR)	385.5	Jack Kestell (SAF)	385.5
1962 - Overall	Phil Caira (SCO)	408	George Manners (ENG)	403.5	Peter Arthur (WAL)	392
1966 - Overall	George Vakakis (AUS)	419.5	Sylvanus Blackman (ENG)	414.5	Mike Pearman (ENG)	409.5
1970 - Overall	Nicolo Ciancio (AUS)	447.5	John Bolton (NZL)	445	Peter Arthur (WAL)	427.5
1974 - Overall	Tony Ford (ENG)	302.5	Paul Wallwork (SAM)	300	Mike Pearman (ENG)	292.5
1978 - Overall	Robert Kabbas (AUS)	322.5	Charles Quagliata (AUS)	287.5	Gary Shadbolt (ENG)	277.5
1982 - Overall	Newton Burrowes (ENG)	325	Guy Greavette (CAN)	320	Cosmas Idioh (NGR)	317.5
1986 - Overall	Dave Morgan (WAL)	350	Robert Kabbas (AUS)	325	Peter May (ENG)	317.5
1990 - Snatch	Dave Morgan (WAL)	155	Muyiwa Odusanya (NGR)	152.5	Sylvain Leblanc (CAN)	145
1990 - Clean and Jerk	Dave Morgan (WAL)	192.5	Soronomathu Ramaswamy (IND)	182.5	Muyiwa Odusanya (NGR)	180
1990 - Overall	Dave Morgan (WAL)	347.5	Muyiwa Odusanya (NGR)	332.5	Andrew Callard (ENG)	317.5
1994 - Snatch	Kiril Kounev (AUS)	152.5	Stephen Ward (ENG)	147.5	Yvan Darsigny (CAN)	
1994 - Clean and Jerk	Kiril Kounev (AUS)	200	Stephen Ward (ENG)	187.5	Yvan Darsigny (CAN)	
1994 - Overall	Kiril Kounev (AUS)	352.5	Stephen Ward (ENG)	335	Yvan Darsigny (CAN)	
1998 - Snatch	Stephen Ward (ENG)	157.5 kg	Leon Griffin (ENG)	155 kg	David Matam (CMR)	147.5 kg
1998 - Clean and Jerk	Leon Griffin (ENG)	192.5 kg	Stephen Ward (ENG)	187.5 kg	David Matam (CMR)	180 kg
1998 - Overall	Leon Griffin (ENG)	347.5 kg	Stephen Ward (ENG)	345 kg	David Matam (CMR)	327.5 kg
2002 - Snatch	David Matam (CMR)	155.0 kg	Anthony Arthur (ENG)	150.0 kg	Niusila Opeloge (SAM)	142.5 kg
2002 - Clean and Jerk	David Matam (CMR)	185.0 kg	Ofisa Ofisa (SAM)	180.0 kg	Anthony Arthur (ENG)	180.0 kg
2002 - Overall	David Matam (CMR)	340.0 kg	Anthony Arthur (ENG)	330.0 kg	Ofisa Ofisa (SAM)	320.0 kg
2006 - Overall	Shujauddin Malik (PAK)		Brice Batchaya (CMR)		Simplice Ribouem (CMR)	
2010 - Overall	Simplice Ribouem (AUS)		Richie Patterson (NZL)		Mathieu Marineau (CAN)	
2014 - Overall	Richie Patterson (NZL)		Vikas Thakur (IND)		Pascal Plamondon (CAN)	
2018 - Overall	Ragala Venkat Rahul (IND)	338 kg	Don Opeloge (SAM)	331 kg	Mohamad Fazrul Azrie (MAS)	328 kg

=== Middle heavyweight ===
Event	Gold		Silver		Bronze	
1954 - Overall	Keevil Daly (CAN)	399	Lennox Kilgour (TRI)	392	Joseph Barnett (ENG)	376.5
1958 - Overall	Manny Santos (AUS)	403.5	Tan Kim Bee (MAS)	392	Leonard Treganowan (AUS)	378.5
1962 - Overall	Louis Martin (ENG)	469.5	Cosford White (CAN)	408	Jackie Samuel (TRI)	399
1966 - Overall	Louis Martin (ENG)	462	George Manners (ENG)	429.5	Dudley Lawson (JAM)	422
1970 - Overall	Louis Martin (ENG)	457.5	Robert Santavy (CAN)	425	George Manners (VIN)	410
1974 - Overall	Nicolo Ciancio (AUS)	330	Brian Marsden (NZL)	315	Steve Wyatt (AUS)	310
1978 - Overall	Gary Langford (ENG)	335	Terry Hadlow (CAN)	330	Brian Marsden (NZL)	312.5
1982 - Overall	Robert Kabbas (AUS)	337.5	Peter Pinsent (ENG)	335	Mike Sabljak (AUS)	325
1986 - Overall	Keith Boxell (ENG)	350	David Mercer (ENG)	342.5	Guy Greavette (CAN)	340
1990 - Snatch	Duncan Dawkins (ENG)	162.5	Keith Boxell (ENG)	152.5	Harvey Goodman (AUS)	150
1990 - Clean and Jerk	Duncan Dawkins (ENG)	195	Keith Boxell (ENG)	192.5	Harvey Goodman (AUS)	190
1990 - Overall	Duncan Dawkins (ENG)	357.5	Keith Boxell (ENG)	345	Harvey Goodman (AUS)	340
1994 - Snatch	Harvey Goodman (AUS)	162.5	Peter May (ENG)	155	Collins Okothnyawallo (KEN)	120
1994 - Clean and Jerk	Harvey Goodman (AUS)	200	Peter May (ENG)	190	Collins Okothnyawallo (KEN)	120
1994 - Overall	Harvey Goodman (AUS)	362.5	Peter May (ENG)	345	Collins Okothnyawallo (KEN)	240
1998 - Snatch	Kiril Kounev (AUS)	165 kg	Anthony Arthur (ENG)	152.5	Simon Heffernan (AUS)	150 kg
1998 - Clean and Jerk	Kiril Kounev (AUS)	205 kg	Andrew Callard (ENG)	190 kg	Simon Heffernan (AUS)	185 kg
1998 - Overall	Kiril Kounev (AUS)	370 kg	Andrew Callard (ENG)	340 kg	Simon Heffernan (AUS)	335 kg
2002 - Snatch	Aleksander Karapetyan (AUS)	167.5 kg	Dave Guest (ENG)	160.0 kg	Thomas Yule (SCO)	157.5 kg
2002 - Clean and Jerk	Aleksander Karapetyan (AUS)	197.5 kg	Julien Galipeau (CAN)	192.5 kg	Karl Grant (ENG)	187.5 kg
2002 - Overall	Aleksander Karapetyan (AUS)	365.0 kg	Dave Guest (ENG)	345.0 kg	Julien Galipeau (CAN)	342.5 kg
2006 - Overall	Aleksander Karapetyan (AUS)		Simon Heffernan (AUS)		Thomas Yule (SCO)	
2010 - Overall	Faavae Faauliuli (SAM)		Peter Kirkbride (SCO)		Benedict Uloko (NGR)	
2014 - Overall	Steven Kari (PNG)		Simplice Ribouem (AUS)		Chandrakant Dadu Mali (IND)	
2018 - Overall	Steven Kari (PNG)	370 kg	Boady Santavy (CAN)	369 kg	Vikas Thakur (IND)	351 kg

=== Heavyweight ===
Event	Gold		Silver		Bronze	
1950 - Overall	Harold Cleghorn (NZL)	900 lb	Ray Magee (AUS)	830 lb	none awarded	
1954 - Overall	Doug Hepburn (CAN)	471.5	Dave Baillie (CAN)	453.5	Harold Cleghorn (NZL)	421.5
1958 - Overall	Ken McDonald (ENG)	455.5	Dave Baillie (CAN)	446.5	Arthur Shannos (AUS)	394.5
1962 - Overall	Arthur Shannos (AUS)	465	Don Oliver (NZL)	465	Brandon Bailey (TRI)	440
1966 - Overall	Don Oliver (NZL)	497	Arthur Shannos (AUS)	464.5	Brandon Bailey (TTO)	462
1970 - Overall	Russ Prior (CAN)	490	Dave Hancock (ENG)	470	Price Morris (CAN)	470
1974 - Overall	Russ Prior (CAN)	352.5	John Bolton (NZL)	340	John Barrett (NZL)	320
1978 - Overall	Russ Prior (CAN)	347.5	Wayne Smith (CAN)	337.5	Andy Drzewiecki (ENG)	335
1982 - Overall	John Burns (WAL)	347.5	Joe Kabalan (AUS)	325	Mario Leblanc (CAN)	315
1986 - Overall	Kevin Roy (CAN)	375	Luigi Fratangelo (AUS)	372.5	Andrew Davies (WAL)	370
1990 - Snatch	Mark Thomas (ENG)	160	Jason Roberts (AUS)	152.5	Steve Wilson (WAL)	152.5
1990 - Clean and Jerk	Mark Thomas (ENG)	197.5	Jason Roberts (AUS)	192.5	Aled Arnold (WAL)	187.5
1990 - Overall	Mark Thomas (ENG)	357.5	Jason Roberts (AUS)	345	Aled Arnold (WAL)	335
1994 - Snatch	Nicu Vlad (AUS)	185	Innocent Chika (NGR)	160	Gareth Hives (WAL)	130
1994 - Clean and Jerk	Nicu Vlad (AUS)	220	Innocent Chika (NGR)	200	Gareth Hives (WAL)	160
1994 - Overall	Nicu Vlad (AUS)	405	Innocent Chika (NGR)	360	Gareth Hives (WAL)	290
1998 - Snatch	Akos Sandor (CAN)	167.5 kg	Thomas Yule (ENG)	160 kg	Nigel Avery (NZL)	155 kg
1998 - Clean and Jerk	Akos Sandor (CAN)	192.5 kg	Thomas Yule (ENG)	190 kg	Karl Grant (ENG)	187.5 kg
1998 - Overall	Akos Sandor (CAN)	360 kg	Thomas Yule (ENG)	350 kg	Nigel Avery (NZL)	340 kg
2002 - Snatch	Delroy McQueen (ENG)	165.0 kg	Akos Sandor (CAN)	165.0 kg	Gurbinder Singh Cheema (ENG)	160.0 kg
2002 - Clean and Jerk	Delroy McQueen (ENG)	210.0 kg	Akos Sandor (CAN)	195.0 kg	Edmund Yeo Thien Chuan (MAS)	170.0 kg
2002 - Overall	Delroy McQueen (ENG)	375.0 kg	Akos Sandor (CAN)	360.0 kg	Edmund Yeo Thien Chuan (MAS)	315.0 kg
2006 - Overall	Akos Sandor (CAN)		Valeri Sarava (AUS)		Mohd Che Mat (MAS)	
2010 - Overall	Niusila Opeloge (SAM)		Stanislav Chalaev (NZL)		Curtis Onaghinor (NGR)	
2014 - Overall	David Katoatau (KIR)		Stanislav Chalaev (NZL)		Ben Watson (ENG)	
2018 - Overall	Sanele Mao (SAM)	360 kg	Pardeep Singh (IND)	352 kg	Owen Boxall (ENG)	351 kg

=== Sub heavyweight ===
Event	Gold		Silver		Bronze	
1978 - Overall	John Burns (WAL)	340	Steve Wyatt (AUS)	325	Robert Santavy (CAN)	315
1982 - Overall	Oliver Orok (NGR)	350	Gary Langford (ENG)	350	Kevin Roy (CAN)	340
1986 - Overall	Denis Garon (CAN)	360	Duncan Dawkins (ENG)	332.5	Andrew Saxton (ENG)	327.5
1990 - Snatch	Andrew Saxton (ENG)	165	Peter May (ENG)	145	Guy Greavette (CAN)	140
1990 - Clean and Jerk	Andrew Saxton (ENG)	197.5	Peter May (ENG)	175	Guy Greavette (CAN)	175
1990 - Overall	Andrew Saxton (ENG)	362.5	Peter May (ENG)	320	Guy Greavette (CAN)	315
1994 - Snatch	Christopher Onyezie (NGR)	155	Andrew Saxton (AUS)	155	Phillip Christou (AUS)	152.5
1994 - Clean and Jerk	Andrew Callard (ENG)	197.5	Andrew Saxton (AUS)	192.5	Christopher Onyezie (NGR)	190
1994 - Overall	Andrew Callard (ENG)	347.5	Andrew Saxton (AUS)	347.5	Christopher Onyezie (NGR)	345

=== Super heavyweight ===
Event	Gold		Silver		Bronze	
1970 - Overall	Ray Rigby (AUS)	500	Terry Perdue (WAL)	500	Grant Anderson (SCO)	432.5
1974 - Overall	Graham May (NZL)	342.5	Andy Kerr (ENG)	337.5	Terry Perdue (WAL)	330
1978 - Overall	Jean-Marc Cardinal (CAN)	365	Bob Edmond (AUS)	322.5	John Hynd (SCO)	305
1982 - Overall	Dean Lukin (AUS)	377.5	Bob Edmond (AUS)	347.5	Bassey Ironbar (NGR)	320
1986 - Overall	Dean Lukin (AUS)	392.5	David Bolduc (CAN)	347.5	Charles Garzarella (AUS)	342.5
1990 - Snatch	Andrew Davies (WAL)	180	Gilbert Ojadi Aduche (NGR)	177.5	Steve Kettner (AUS)	172.5
1990 - Clean and Jerk	Andrew Davies (WAL)	222.5	Gilbert Ojadi Aduche (NGR)	222.5	Steve Kettner (AUS)	205
1990 - Overall	Andrew Davies (WAL)	402.5	Gilbert Ojadi Aduche (NGR)	400	Steve Kettner (AUS)	377.5
1994 - Snatch	Steve Kettner (AUS)	165	Stefan Botev (AUS)	160	Victor Edem (NGR)	155
1994 - Clean and Jerk	Stefan Botev (AUS)	200	Steve Kettner (AUS)	195	Victor Edem (NGR)	190
1994 - Overall	Stefan Botev (AUS)	360	Steve Kettner (AUS)	360	Victor Edem (NGR)	345
1998 - Snatch	Darren Liddel (NZL)	165 kg	Giles Greenwood (ENG)	162.5 kg	Chris Rae (AUS)	160 kg
1998 - Clean and Jerk	Darren Liddel (NZL)	202.5 kg	Jean Bilong (CMR)	192.5 kg	Chris Rae (AUS)	192.5 kg
1998 - Overall	Darren Liddel (NZL)	367.5 kg	Chris Rae (AUS)	352.5 kg	Giles Greenwood (ENG)	352.5 kg
2002 - Snatch	Giles Greenwood (ENG)	180.0 kg	Nigel Avery (NZL)	175.0 kg	Chris Rae (AUS)	175.0 kg
2002 - Clean and Jerk	Nigel Avery (NZL)	215.0 kg	Corran Hocking (AUS)	210.0 kg	Giles Greenwood (ENG)	207.5 kg
2002 - Overall	Nigel Avery (NZL)	390.0 kg	Giles Greenwood (ENG)	387.5 kg	Corran Hocking (AUS)	380.0 kg
2006 - Overall	Chris Rae (AUS)		Damon Kelly (AUS)		Itte Detenamo (NRU)	
2010 - Overall	Damon Kelly (AUS)		Itte Detenamo (NRU)		George Kobaladze (CAN)	
2014 - Overall	George Kobaladze (CAN)		Itte Detenamo (NRU)		Damon Kelly (AUS)	
2018 - Overall	David Liti (NZL)	403 kg	Lauititi Lui (SAM)	400 kg	Muhammad Nooh Dastgir Butt (PAK)	395 kg

== Women's ==
=== 48kg ===
Event	Gold		Silver		Bronze	
2002 - Snatch	Kunjarani Devi (IND)	75.0 kg	Karine Turcotte (CAN)	70.0 kg	Ebonette Deigaeruk (NRU)	60.0 kg
2002 - Clean and Jerk	Kunjarani Devi (IND)	92.5 kg	Karine Turcotte (CAN)	87.5 kg	Ebonette Deigaeruk (NRU)	85.0 kg
2002 - Overall	Kunjarani Devi (IND)	167.5 kg	Karine Turcotte (CAN)	157.5 kg	Ebonette Deigaeruk (NRU)	145.0 kg
2006 - Overall	Kunjarani Devi (IND)		Marilou Dozois-Prévost (CAN)		Erika Yamasaki (AUS)	
2010 - Overall	Augustina Nkem Nwaokolo (NGR)		Ngangbam Soniya Chanu (IND)		Atom Sandyarani Devi (IND)	
2014 - Overall	Sanjita Khumukchan (IND)		Mirabai Chanu Saikhom (IND)		Nkechi Opara (NGR)	
2018 - Overall	Saikhom Mirabai Chanu (IND)	196 kg	Roilya Ranaivosoa (MRI)	170 kg	Dinusha Gomes (SRI)	155 kg

=== 53kg ===
Event	Gold		Silver		Bronze	
2002 - Snatch	Sanamacha Chanu (IND)	82.5 kg	Natasha Barker (AUS)	77.5 kg	Seen Lee (AUS)	75.0 kg
2002 - Clean and Jerk	Sanamacha Chanu (IND)	100.0 kg	Natasha Barker (AUS)	97.5 kg	Seen Lee (AUS)	87.5 kg
2002 - Overall	Sanamacha Chanu (IND)	182.5 kg	Natasha Barker (AUS)	175.0 kg	Seen Lee (AUS)	162.5 kg
2006 - Overall	Maryse Turcotte (CAN)		Dika Toua (PNG)		Nadeene Latif (AUS)	
2010 - Overall	Marilou Dozois-Prévost (CAN)		Onyeka Azike (NGR)		Raihan Yusoff (MAS)	
2014 - Overall *	Dika Toua (PNG)		Santoshi Matsa (IND)		Swati Singh (IND)	
2018 - Overall	Khumukcham Sanjita Chanu (IND)	192 kg	Dika Toua (PNG)	182 kg	Rachel Leblanc-Bazinet (CAN)	181 kg

=== 58kg ===
Event	Gold		Silver		Bronze	
2002 - Snatch	Michaela Breeze (WAL)	87.5 kg	Maryse Turcotte (CAN)	87.5 kg	Sunaina Sunaina (IND)	85.0 kg
2002 - Clean and Jerk	Maryse Turcotte (CAN)	115.0 kg	Michaela Breeze (WAL)	112.5 kg	Sunaina Sunaina (IND)	107.5 kg
2002 - Overall	Maryse Turcotte (CAN)	202.5 kg	Michaela Breeze (WAL)	200.0 kg	Sunaina Sunaina (IND)	192.5 kg
2006 - Overall	Renu Bala Chanu (IND)		Emily Quarton (CAN)		Natasha Barker (AUS)	
2010 - Overall	Renu Bala Chanu (IND)		Seen Lee (AUS)		Zoe Smith (ENG)	
2014 - Overall	Zoe Smith (ENG)		Ndidi Winifred (NGR)		Michaela Breeze (WAL)	
2018 - Overall	Tia-Clair Toomey (AUS)	201 kg	Tali Darsigny (CAN)	200 kg	Jenly Tegu Wini (SOL)	189 kg

=== 63kg ===
Event	Gold		Silver		Bronze	
2002 - Snatch	Pascale Dorcelus (CAN)	87.5 kg	Pratima Kumari (IND)	87.5 kg	Prasmita Mangaraj (IND)	85.0 kg
2002 - Clean and Jerk	Pratima Kumari (IND)	117.5 kg	Prasmita Mangaraj (IND)	110.0 kg	Christine Girard (CAN)	100.0 kg
2002 - Overall	Pratima Kumari (IND)	205.0 kg	Prasmita Mangaraj (IND)	195.0 kg	Pascale Dorcelus (CAN)	185.0 kg
2006 - Overall	Michaela Breeze (WAL)		Christine Girard (CAN)		Miel McGerrigle (CAN)	
2010 - Overall	Obioma Okoli (NGR)		Michaela Breeze (WAL)		Marie Fegue (CMR)	
2014 - Overall	Olauwatoyin Adesanmi (NGR)		Obioma Okoli (NGR)		Punam Yadav (IND)	
2018 - Overall	Maude Charron (CAN)	220 kg	Zoe Smith (ENG)	207 kg	Mona Pretorius (RSA)	206 kg

=== 69kg ===
Event	Gold		Silver		Bronze	
2002 - Snatch	Madeleine Yamechi (CMR)	100.0 kg	Neelam Setti Laxmi (IND)	95.0 kg	Sheba Deireragea (NRU)	90.0 kg
2002 - Clean and Jerk	Madeleine Yamechi (CMR)	130.0 kg	Neelam Setti Laxmi (IND)	110.0 kg	Sheba Deireragea (NRU)	110.0 kg
2002 - Overall	Madeleine Yamechi (CMR)	230.0 kg	Neelam Setti Laxmi (IND)	205.0 kg	Sheba Deireragea (NRU)	200.0 kg
2006 - Overall	Jeane Lassen (CAN)		Monika Devi (IND)		Janet Georges (SEY)	
2010 - Overall	Christine Girard (CAN)		Janet Georges (SEY)		Itohan Ebireguesele (NGR)	
2014 - Overall	Marie Fegue (CMR)		Itohan Ebireguesele (NGR)		Marie-Josée Arès-Pilon (CAN)	
2018 - Overall	Punam Yadav (IND)	222 kg	Sarah Davies (ENG)	217 kg	Apolonia Vaivai (FIJ)	216 kg

=== 75kg ===
Event	Gold		Silver		Bronze	
2002 - Snatch	Shailaja Pujari (IND)	97.5 kg	Deborah Lovely (AUS)	95.0 kg	Saree Williams (AUS)	82.5 kg
2002 - Clean and Jerk	Shailaja Pujari (IND)	125.0 kg	Deborah Lovely (AUS)	107.5 kg	Mary Diranga (NRU)	102.5 kg
2002 - Overall	Shailaja Pujari (IND)	222.5 kg	Deborah Lovely (AUS)	202.5 kg	Saree Williams (AUS)	182.5 kg
2006 - Overall	Deborah Lovely (AUS)		Sheba Deireragea (NRU)		Babalwa Ndleleni (RSA)	
2010 - Overall	Hadiza Zakari (NGR)		Marie-Ève Beauchemin-Nadeau (CAN)		Monika Devi (IND)	
2014 - Overall	Marie-Ève Beauchemin-Nadeau (CAN)		Mary Opeloge (SAM)		Apolonia Vaivai (FIJ)	
2018 - Overall	Emily Godley (ENG)	222 kg	Marie-Ève Beauchemin-Nadeau (CAN)	221 kg	Laura Hughes (WAL)	207 kg

=== 75+kg ===
Event	Gold		Silver		Bronze	
2002 - Snatch	Caroline Pileggi (AUS)	100.0 kg	Olivia Baker (NZL)	100.0 kg	Reanna Solomon (NRU)	100 kg
2002 - Clean and Jerk	Reanna Solomon (NRU)	127.5 kg	Caroline Pileggi (AUS)	125.0 kg	Olivia Baker (NZL)	125.0 kg
2002 - Overall	Reanna Solomon (NRU)	227.5 kg	Caroline Pileggi (AUS)	225.0 kg	Olivia Baker (NZL)	225.0 kg
2006 - Overall	Geeta Rani (IND)		Simple Kaur (IND)		Keisha-Dean Soffe (NZL)	
2010 - Overall	Ele Opeloge (SAM)		Mariam Usman (NGR)		Deborah Acason (AUS)	
2014 - Overall	Mariam Usman (NGR)		Ele Opeloge (SAM)		Tracey Lambrechs (NZL)	

=== 90kg ===
Event	Gold		Silver		Bronze	
2018 - Overall	Eileen Cikamatana (FIJ)	233 kg	Kaity Fassina (AUS)	232 kg	Clementine Meukeugni Noumbissi (CMR)	226 kg

=== +90kg ===
Event	Gold		Silver		Bronze	
2018 - Overall	Feagaiga Stowers (SAM)	253 kg	Charisma Amoe-Tarrant (NRU)	243 kg	Emily Campbell (ENG)	242 kg

== Powerlifting ==
=== Men's 72 kg ===
Event	Gold	Silver	Bronze
2014	Paul Kehinde (NGR)	Rolland Ezuruike (NGR)	Ali Jawad (ENG)

=== Men's +72 kg ===
Event	Gold	Silver	Bronze
2014	Abdulazeez Ibrahim (NGR)	Rajinder Singh Rahelu (IND)	Jong Yee Khie (MAS)

=== Women's 61 kg ===
Event	Gold	Silver	Bronze
2014	Esther Oyema (NGR)	Natalie Blake (ENG)	Sakina Khatun (IND)

=== Women's +61 kg ===
Event	Gold	Silver	Bronze
2014	Loveline Obiji (NGR)	Bose Omolayo (NGR)	Joyce Wambui Njuguna (KEN)

=== Men's open ===
Event	Gold	Silver	Bronze
2006	Ruel Ishaku (NGR)	Jason Irving (ENG)	Darren Gardiner (AUS)
2010	Yakubu Adesokan (NGR)	Anthony Ulonnam (NGR)	Ikechukwu Obichukwu (NGR)

=== Women's open ===
Event	Gold	Silver	Bronze
2010	Esther Oyema (NGR)	Ganiyatu Onaolapo (NGR)	Osamwenyobor Arasomwan (NGR)

=== Bench Press EAD ===
Event	Gold	Silver	Bronze
2002	Solomon Amarakuo (NGR); 150.4 kg	Richard Nicholson (AUS); 148.5 kg	Cheok Kon Fatt (MAS); 380.0 kg
