= Weightlifting at the 1990 Commonwealth Games =

- Venue: Carter Holt Pavilion (hall 2), Auckland Showgrounds
- Location: Auckland, New Zealand
- Dates: 24 January – 3 February 1990

Weightlifting at the 1990 Commonwealth Games was the 11th appearance of Weightlifting at the Commonwealth Games. The events were held in Auckland, New Zealand, from 24 January to 3 February 1990. The competition featured contests in ten weight classes.

The weightlifting events were held at the Carter Holt Pavilion (hall 2) on the Auckland Showgrounds. The General Assembly voted to allow three gold medals per weight category (snatch, clean and jerk and overall) to match the world championships format. Thirty gold medals were available in ten weight categories and resulted in the odd scenario where one athlete could win three gold medals in the same event.

India topped the weightlifting medal table by virtue of winning 12 gold medals.

== Medal table ==
* Host nation (New Zealand)

| Rank | Nation | Gold | Silver | Bronze | Total |
|---|---|---|---|---|---|
| 1 | India | 12 | 7 | 5 | 24 |
| 2 | England | 9 | 6 | 1 | 16 |
| 3 | Wales | 6 | 1 | 5 | 12 |
| 4 | Australia | 2 | 4 | 11 | 17 |
| 5 | Nauru | 1 | 2 | 0 | 3 |
| 6 | Nigeria | 0 | 8 | 1 | 9 |
| 7 | Scotland | 0 | 2 | 1 | 3 |
| 8 | Canada | 0 | 0 | 6 | 6 |
| Totals (8 entries) | | 30 | 30 | 30 | 90 |

== Medallists ==
| Event | Gold | Silver | Bronze |
|---|---|---|---|
Flyweight 52kg
| Snatch | Chandersekaran Raghavan; India | Velu Govindraj; India | Greg Hayman; Australia |
| Clean and Jerk | Chandersekaran Raghavan; India | Greg Hayman; Australia | Velu Govindraj; India |
| Overall | Chandersekaran Raghavan; India | Velu Govindraj; India | Greg Hayman; Australia |
Bantamweight 56kg
| Snatch | Rangaswamy Punnuswamy; India | Alan Ogilvie; Scotland | Denis Aumais; Canada |
| Clean and Jerk | Rangaswamy Punnuswamy; India | Gopal Maruthachelam; India | Alan Ogilvie; Scotland |
| Overall | Rangaswamy Punnuswamy; India | Alan Ogilvie; Scotland | Gopal Maruthachelam; India |
Featherweight 60kg
| Snatch | Marcus Stephen; Nauru | Parvesh Chander Sharma; India | Kumarasan Sudalaimani; India |
| Clean and Jerk | Parvesh Chander Sharma; India | Marcus Stephen; Nauru | Kumarasan Sudalaimani; India |
| Overall | Parvesh Chander Sharma; India | Marcus Stephen; Nauru | Kumarasan Sudalaimani; India |
Lightweight 67.5kg
| Snatch | Paramjit Sharma; India | Lawrence Iquaibom; Nigeria | Mark Blair; Australia |
| Clean and Jerk | Paramjit Sharma; India | Lawrence Iquaibom; Nigeria | Mark Roach; Wales |
| Overall | Paramjit Sharma; India | Lawrence Iquaibom; Nigeria | Mark Roach; Wales |
Middleweight 75kg
| Snatch | Karnadhar Mondal; India | Karl Jones; Wales | Ron Laycock; Australia |
| Clean and Jerk | Ron Laycock; Australia | Karnadhar Mondal; India | Damian Brown |
| Overall | Ron Laycock; Australia | Karnadhar Mondal; India | Benoît Gagné; Canada |
Light Heavyweight 82.5kg
| Snatch | David Morgan; Wales | Muyiwa Odusanya; Nigeria | Sylvain Leblanc; Canada |
| Clean and Jerk | David Morgan; Wales | Soronamuthu Karupaswamy; India | Muyiwa Odusanya; Nigeria |
| Overall | David Morgan; Wales | Muyiwa Odusanya; Nigeria | Andy Callard; England |
Middle Heavyweight 90kg
| Snatch | Duncan Dawkins; England | Keith Boxell; England | Harvey Goodman; Australia |
| Clean and Jerk | Duncan Dawkins; England | Keith Boxell; England | Harvey Goodman; Australia |
| Overall | Duncan Dawkins; England | Keith Boxell; England | Harvey Goodman; Australia |
Sub Heavyweight 100kg
| Snatch | Andrew Saxton; England | Peter May; England | Guy Greavette; Canada |
| Clean and Jerk | Andrew Saxton; England | Peter May; England | Guy Greavette; Canada |
| Overall | Andrew Saxton; England | Peter May; England | Guy Greavette; Canada |
Heavyweight 110kg
| Snatch | Mark Thomas; England | Jason Roberts; Australia | Steve Wilson; Wales |
| Clean and Jerk | Mark Thomas; England | Jason Roberts; Australia | Aled Arnold; Wales |
| Overall | Mark Thomas; England | Jason Roberts; Australia | Aled Arnold; Wales |
Super Heavyweight +110kg
| Snatch | Andrew Davies; Wales | Aduche Ojadi; Nigeria | Steven Kettner; Australia |
| Clean and Jerk | Andrew Davies; Wales | Aduche Ojadi; Nigeria | Steven Kettner; Australia |
| Overall | Andrew Davies; Wales | Aduche Ojadi; Nigeria | Steven Kettner; Australia |

== Results ==
- Athletes listed in overall position

=== Flyweight 52kg ===
| Pos | Athlete | Clean & jerk | Snatch | Overall kg |
|---|---|---|---|---|
| 1 | Raghavan Chanderasekaran (IND) | 127.5 | 105.0 | 232.5 |
| 2 | Velu Govindraj (IND) | 117.5 | 95.0 | 212.5 |
| 3 | Greg Hayman (AUS) | 117.5 | 90.0 | 207.5 |
| 4 | Quynh Nguyen (CAN) | 110.0 | 90.0 | 200.0 |
| 5 | Alexander McFarlane (SCO) | 105.0 | 85.0 | 190.00 |

=== Bantamweight 56kg ===
| Pos | Athlete | Clean & jerk | Snatch | Overall kg |
|---|---|---|---|---|
| 1 | Ponnuswamy Rangaswamy (IND) | 137.5 | 110.0 | 247.5 |
| 2 | Alan Ogilvie (SCO) | 122.5 | 107.5 | 230.0 |
| 3 | Gopal Maruthachelam (IND) | 125.0 | 102.5 | 227.5 |
| 4 | Denis Aumais (CAN) | 122.5 | 102.5 | 225.0 |
| 5 | Teo Yong Joo (SIN) | 120.0 | 95.0 | 215.0 |
| 6 | Philip Chappell (NZL) | 122.5 | 92.5 | 215.0 |
| 7 | Shane Judson (NZL) | 112.5 | 90.0 | 202.5 |
| 8 | Denis O'Brien (SCO) | 102.5 | 87.5 | 190.0 |
| 9 | Zulfikar Osman (KEN) | 100.0 | 72.5 | 172.5 |
| 10 | Russell John Holloway (AUS) | x | 97.5 | 97.5 |

=== Featherweight 60kg ===
| Pos | Athlete | Clean & jerk | Snatch | Overall kg |
|---|---|---|---|---|
| 1 | Parvesh Chander Sharma (IND) | 145.0 | 112.5 | 257.5 |
| 2 | Marcus Stephen (NRU) | 142.5 | 112.5 | 255.0 |
| 3 | Kumarasan Sudalaimani (IND) | 142.5 | 110.0 | 252.5 |
| 4 | Kayode Ibitade (NGR) | 135.0 | 107.5 | 242.5 |
| 5 | Jeffrey Bryce (WAL) | 132.5 | 105.0 | 237.5 |
| 6 | Geoff Laws (ENG) | 127.5 | 105.0 | 232.5 |
| 7 | Sabhijinder Singh Hayer (ENG) | 130.0 | 95.0 | 225.0 |
| 8 | Eamon Byrne (NIR) | 125.0 | 95.0 | 220.0 |
| 9 | Graham Cunningham (SCO) | 105.0 | 97.5 | 202.5 |
| 10 | Boniface Juma (KEN) | 107.5 | 75.0 | 182.5 |
| 11 | Penitila Faamoe (SAM) | x | 92.5 | 92.5 |

=== Lightweight 67.5kg ===
| Pos | Athlete | Clean & jerk | Snatch | Overall kg |
|---|---|---|---|---|
| 1 | Paramjit Sharma (IND) | 165.0 | 130.0 | 295.0 |
| 2 | Lawrence Iquaibom (NGR) | 160.0 | 130.0 | 290.0 |
| 3 | Mark Roach (WAL) | 155.0 | 125.0 | 280.0 |
| 4 | Raymond Williams (WAL) | 155.0 | 125.0 | 280.0 |
| 5 | Mark Blair (AUS) | 150.0 | 127.5 | 277.5 |
| 6 | Redjean Clerc (CAN) | 147.5 | 122.5 | 270.0 |
| 7 | Patrick Arnau (CAN) | 150.0 | 120.0 | 270.0 |
| 8 | Thomas McIntyre (NZL) | 145.0 | 112.5 | 257.5 |
| 9 | Lester Keene (NZL) | 135.0 | 112.5 | 247.5 |
| 10 | Pimye Malibi (PNG) | 130.0 | 100.0 | 230.0 |
| 11 | Norman Cunningham (SCO) | 125.0 | 105.0 | 230.0 |
| 12 | Kamba Kandoa (PNG) | 115.0 | 97.5 | 212.5 |
| 13 | Leslie Ata (Solomon Islands) | 117.5 | 95.0 | 212.5 |
| 14 | Subratakumar Paul (IND) | x | x | disq |

=== Middleweight 75kg ===
| Pos | Athlete | Clean & jerk | Snatch | Overall kg |
|---|---|---|---|---|
| 1 | Ron Laycock (AUS) | 177.5 | 132.5 | 310.0 |
| 2 | Karnadhar Mondal (IND) | 170.0 | 135.0 | 305.0 |
| 3 | Benoît Gagné (CAN) | 162.5 | 130.0 | 292.5 |
| 4 | Marco Loyer (CAN) | 160.0 | 130.0 | 290.0 |
| 5 | Karl Jones (WAL) | 155.0 | 135.0 | 290.0 |
| 6 | Bob Siape (PNG) | 135.0 | 107.5 | 242.5 |
| 7 | Philip Ochieng (KEN) | 130.0 | 110.0 | 240.0 |
| 8 | Roger Token (PNG) | 137.5 | 100.0 | 237.5 |
| 9 | Mika Toetu (SAM) | 120.0 | 90.0 | 210.0 |
| 10 | Paul Hoffman (SWZ) | 117.5 | 85.0 | 202.5 |
| 11 | Damian Gerard Brown (AUS) | 167.5 | x | 167.5 |
| 12 | Ricky Chaplin (WAL) | x | x | disq |

=== Light Heavyweight 82.5kg ===
| Pos | Athlete | Clean & jerk | Snatch | Overall kg |
|---|---|---|---|---|
| 1 | David Morgan (WAL) | 192.5 | 155.0 | 347.5 |
| 2 | Muyiwa Odusanya (IND) | 180.0 | 152.5 | 332.5 |
| 3 | Andy Callard (ENG) | 180.0 | 137.5 | 317.5 |
| 4 | Soronamuthu Karupaswamy (IND) | 182.5 | 132.5 | 315.0 |
| 5 | Alain Bilodeau (CAN) | 177.5 | 135.0 | 312.5 |
| 6 | Allister Nalder (NZL) | 167.5 | 140.0 | 307.5 |
| 7 | Sylvain Leblanc (CAN) | 160.0 | 145.0 | 305.0 |
| 8 | Michael Foo-Chong (NZL) | 160.0 | 122.5 | 282.5 |
| 9 | John McEwan (SCO) | 150.0 | 125.0 | 275.0 |
| 10 | David Teiko (PNG) | 147.5 | 107.5 | 255.0 |
| 11 | Absalom Shabangu (SWZ) | 125.0 | 90.0 | 215.0 |
| 12 | Phillip Christou (AUS) | 180.0 | x | 180.0 |

=== Middle Heavyweight 90kg ===
| Pos | Athlete | Clean & jerk | Snatch | Overall kg |
|---|---|---|---|---|
| 1 | Duncan Dawkins (ENG) | 195.0 | 162.5 | 357.5 |
| 2 | Keith Boxell (ENG) | 192.5 | 152.5 | 345.0 |
| 3 | Harvey Goodman (AUS) | 190.0 | 150.0 | 340.0 |
| 4 | Yvan Darsigny (CAN) | 180.0 | 150.0 | 330.0 |
| 5 | Kevin Blake (NZL) | 175.0 | 140.0 | 315.0 |

=== Sub Heavyweight 100kg ===
| Pos | Athlete | Clean & jerk | Snatch | Overall kg |
|---|---|---|---|---|
| 1 | Andrew Saxton (ENG) | 197.5 | 165.0 | 362.5 |
| 2 | Peter May (ENG) | 175.0 | 145.0 | 320.0 |
| 3 | Guy Greavette (CAN) | 175.0 | 140.0 | 315.0 |
| 4 | Emil Huch (SAM) | 150.0 | 117.5 | 267.5 |
| 5 | Gareth Hives (WAL) | x | x | disq |

=== Heavyweight 110kg ===
| Pos | Athlete | Clean & jerk | Snatch | Overall kg |
|---|---|---|---|---|
| 1 | Mark Thomas (ENG) | 197.5 | 160.0 | 357.5 |
| 2 | Jason Roberts (AUS) | 192.5 | 152.5 | 345.0 |
| 3 | Aled Arnold (WAL) | 187.5 | 147.5 | 335.0 |
| 4 | Steven Wilson (WAL) | 175.0 | 152.5 | 327.5 |
| 5 | Mike Tererui (COK) | 135.0 | 97.5 | 230.0 |
| 6 | Joseph Kauvai (COK) | 130.0 | 95.0 | 227.5 |

=== Super Heavyweight +110kg ===
| Pos | Athlete | Clean & jerk | Snatch | Overall kg |
|---|---|---|---|---|
| 1 | Andrew Davies (WAL) | 222.5 | 180.0 | 402.5 |
| 2 | Aduche Ojadi (NGR) | 222.5 | 177.5 | 400.5 |
| 3 | Steve Kettner (AUS) | 205.0 | 172.5 | 377.5 |
| 4 | Matthew Vine (ENG) | 202.5 | 150.0 | 352.5 |
| 5 | Chaudhary Amin (PAK) | 190.0 | 160.0 | 350.0 |
| 6 | John Willson (ENG) | 170.0 | 150.0 | 320.0 |
| 7 | Fotu Iopu (SAM) | 180.0 | 132.5 | 312.5 |
| 8 | Charles Garzarella (AUS) | 130.0 | 160.0 | 290.0 |
| 9 | Billy Tafilipepe (SAM) | 150.0 | 122.5 | 272.5 |
| 10 | Calvin Stamp (JAM) | x | 150.0 | 150.0 |

== See also ==
- List of Commonwealth Games medallists in weightlifting
