= India at the 1990 Commonwealth Games =

- CG code: IND
- CGA: Indian Olympic Association
- Website: olympic.ind.in

in Auckland, New Zealand
- Competitors: 55 in 6 sports
- Medals Ranked 5th: Gold 13 Silver 8 Bronze 11 Total 32

Commonwealth Games appearances (overview)
- 1934; 1938; 1950; 1954; 1958; 1962; 1966; 1970; 1974; 1978; 1982; 1986; 1990; 1994; 1998; 2002; 2006; 2010; 2014; 2018; 2022; 2026; 2030

India competed at the 1990 Commonwealth Games held in Auckland, New Zealand, from 24 January to 3 February 1990. It was the country's tenth appearance at the Commonwealth Games since making its debut at the 1934 British Empire Games. India returned to the Commonwealth Games after having boycotted the 1986 edition held in Edinburgh, as a part of the wider boycott, to protest Britain's sporting links with apartheid South Africa.

The Indian contingent consisted of 55 athletes competing across six sports. India won a total of 32 medals, comprising 13 gold, eight silver, and 11 bronze medals, to finish fifth in the overall medal table.

== Medalists ==
India won thirty-two medals, including thirteen gold, eight silver and eleven bronze medals, to finish fifth in the overall medal table. Weightlifting was the team's most successful sport with 24 medals. India also won its first ever Commonwealth Games gold medal in shooting and the country's first medals in judo.

Medal	Name	Sport	Event
(gold) Gold	Ashok Pandit	Shooting	25 m centre-fire pistol
(gold) Gold	Chandersekaran Raghavan	Weightlifting	Flyweight 52 kg – snatch
(gold) Gold	Chandersekaran Raghavan	Weightlifting	Flyweight 52 kg – clean and jerk
(gold) Gold	Chandersekaran Raghavan	Weightlifting	Flyweight 52 kg – overall
(gold) Gold	Rangaswamy Punnuswamy	Weightlifting	Bantamweight 56 kg – snatch
(gold) Gold	Rangaswamy Punnuswamy	Weightlifting	Bantamweight 56 kg – clean and jerk
(gold) Gold	Rangaswamy Punnuswamy	Weightlifting	Bantamweight 56 kg – overall
(gold) Gold	Parvesh Chander Sharma	Weightlifting	Featherweight 60 kg – clean and jerk
(gold) Gold	Parvesh Chander Sharma	Weightlifting	Featherweight 60 kg – clean and jerk
(gold) Gold	Paramjit Sharma	Weightlifting	Lightweight 67.5 kg – snatch
(gold) Gold	Paramjit Sharma	Weightlifting	Lightweight 67.5 kg – clean and jerk
(gold) Gold	Paramjit Sharma	Weightlifting	Lightweight 67.5 kg – overall
(gold) Gold	Karnadhar Mondal	Weightlifting	Middleweight 75 kg – snatch
(silver) Silver	Surinder Marwah	Shooting	25 m centre-fire pistol
(silver) Silver	Velu Govindraj	Weightlifting	Flyweight 52 kg – snatch
(silver) Silver	Velu Govindraj	Weightlifting	Flyweight 52 kg – overall
(silver) Silver	Gopal Maruthachelam	Weightlifting	Bantamweight 56 kg – clean and jerk
(silver) Silver	Parvesh Chander Sharma	Weightlifting	Featherweight 60 kg – snatch
(silver) Silver	Karnadhar Mondal	Weightlifting	Middleweight 75 kg – clean and jerk
(silver) Silver	Karnadhar Mondal	Weightlifting	Middleweight 75 kg – overall
(silver) Silver	Soronomathu Ramaswamy	Weightlifting	Light heavyweight 82.5 kg – clean and jerk
(bronze) Bronze	Dharmendar Yadav	Boxing	Light flyweight under 48 kg
(bronze) Bronze	Narender Singh	Judo	Men's extra lightweight 60 kg
(bronze) Bronze	Rajender Dhanger	Judo	Men's middleweight 86 kg
(bronze) Bronze	Soma Dutta	Shooting	50 m rifle three positions
(bronze) Bronze	Ashok Pandit; Surinder Marwah	Shooting	25 m centre-fire pistol pairs
(bronze) Bronze	Soma Dutta; Bhagirath Samai	Shooting	10 m air rifle pairs
(bronze) Bronze	Velu Govindraj	Weightlifting	Flyweight 52 kg – clean and jerk
(bronze) Bronze	Gopal Maruthachelam	Weightlifting	Bantamweight 56 kg – overall
(bronze) Bronze	Kumarasan Sudalaimani	Weightlifting	Featherweight 60 kg – snatch
(bronze) Bronze	Kumarasan Sudalaimani	Weightlifting	Featherweight 60 kg – clean and jerk
(bronze) Bronze	Kumarasan Sudalaimani	Weightlifting	Featherweight 60 kg – overall

== Competitors ==
The Indian contingent included 55 athletes competing across six sports.

Sport	Men	Women	Total
Badminton	5	3	8
Boxing	5	—N/a	5
Judo	7	4	11
Lawn bowls	7	0	7
Shooting	14	0	14
Weightlifting	10	—N/a	10
Total	48	7	55

== Badminton ==
Athlete	Event	Round of 64	Round of 32	Round of 16	Quarterfinal	Semifinal	Final / BM	
Athlete	Event	Opposition Result	Opposition Result	Opposition Result	Opposition Result	Opposition Result	Opposition Result	Rank
U. Vimal Kumar	Men's singles		W	Baddeley (ENG); L 17–18, 1–15	Did not advance			
Sushanta Borah	Men's singles		L	Did not advance				
Sanjay Sharma	Men's singles		L	Did not advance				
Rajeev Bhagga	Men's singles	L	Did not advance					
V. Kumar	Men's singles	L	Did not advance					
Deepti Thanekar	Women's singles	—N/a	W	Whittaker (CAN); W 12–11, 4–11, 12–10	Piché (CAN); W 11–5, 11–4	Smith (ENG); L 2–11, 2–11	Troke (ENG); L 0–11, 0–11	4
Madhumita Bisht	Women's singles	—N/a	W	Sat (HKG); W 11–3, 11–6	Troke (ENG); L 5–11, 11–4, 6–11	Did not advance		
Sudha Padmanabhan	Women's singles	—N/a	L	Did not advance				
Rajeev Bagga; Sanjay Sharma	Men's doubles	—N/a		L	Did not advance			
Madhumita Bisht; Sudha Padmanabhan	Women's doubles	—N/a		L	Did not advance			
Sushanta Borah; Deepti Thanekar	Mixed doubles	—N/a	L	Did not advance				
U. Vimal Kumar; Sanjay Sharma; Sushanta Borah; Rajeev Bagga; Madhumita Bisht; Sudha Padmanabhan	Mixed team	—N/a		L	Did not advance			9

== Boxing ==
India competed in five boxing events at the 1990 Commonwealth Games. Dharmendar Yadav won the bronze medal in the light-flyweight division.

Athlete	Event	Preliminary	Quarterfinal	Semifinal	Final	Rank
Athlete	Event	Opposition Result	Opposition Result	Opposition Result	Opposition Result	Rank
Dharmendar Yadav	Light-flyweight 48 kg	Bye	Bryant (AUS); W 5:0	Ramadhani (KEN); L 1:4	Did not advance	3rd place, bronze medalist(s)
Zoram Thanga	Flyweight 51 kg	Robati (COK); W RSC	Tshabangu (ZIM); L 0:5	Did not advance		
Manoj Pingale	Bantamweight 54 kg	Pittman (COK); W RSC	Chikwanda (ZAM); L 2:3	Did not advance		
Gopal Dewang	Light-middleweight 71 kg	Creery (NZL); L 1:4	Did not advance			
Mukund Killekar	Middleweight 75 kg	Edwards (ENG); L RSC	Did not advance			

Legend

- W – Win; L – Loss;
- RSC – Referee Stops Contest

== Judo ==
India competed in eleven judo events at the 1990 Commonwealth Games. Narender Singh and Rajender Dhanger won bronze medals in the extra lightweight and middleweight divisions respectively.

Men

Athlete	Event	Preliminary	Quarterfinal	Semifinal	Final / BM	Rank
Athlete	Event	Opposition Result	Opposition Result	Opposition Result	Opposition Result	Rank
Narender Singh	Extra lightweight 60 kg	Au (HKG); W ippon	Finney (ENG); L ippon	Viglione (AUS); W yuko	Did not advance	3rd place, bronze medalist(s)
Tilak Thapa	Half lightweight 65 kg	Leung (HKG); W ippon	Cantin (CAN); L yuko	Did not advance		
Sandeep Byala	Lightweight 71 kg	—N/a	Cusack (SCO); L ippon	Did not advance		
Chandrama Yadav	Half middleweight 78 kg	Cote (CAN); L ippon	Did not advance			
Rajender Dhanger	Middleweight 86 kg	—N/a	—N/a	Sweatman (SCO); L ippon	Woods (WAL); W ippon	3rd place, bronze medalist(s)
Cawas Billimoria	Open	Bacon (AUS); L waza-ari	Did not advance			

Athlete	Event	Round-robin				Rank
Athlete	Event	Opposition Result	Opposition Result	Opposition Result	Opposition Result	Rank
Ram Singh	Heavyweight +95 kg	Greenway (CAN); L ippon	Pendlebury (AUS); L ippon	Gordon (ENG); L ippon	Watson (NZL); L ippon	5

Women

Athlete	Event	1st round	Quarterfinal	Semifinal	Repechage	Final / BM	Rank
Athlete	Event	Opposition Result	Opposition Result	Opposition Result	Opposition Result	Opposition Result	Rank
Triveni Mannenagaraj	Extra lightweight 48 kg	Briggs (ENG); L ippon	Did not advance		Chan (HKG); W yuko	Robertson (SCO); L ippon	5
Anita Tokas	Half lightweight 52 kg	Moore (NZL); L ippon	Did not advance				
Sunith Thakur	Lightweight 56 kg	—N/a	Osagie (NGR); L waza-ari-awasete	Did not advance			
Preeti Sharma	Half middleweight 61 kg	Guy-Halkyard (NZL); L waza-ari-awasete	Did not advance				

Legend

- W – Win; L – Loss
- Ippon – Full-point victory
- Waza-ari – Half-point score
- Yuko – Minor score
- Waza-ari-awasete – Two waza-ari scores resulting in ippon

== Lawn bowls ==
India competed in lawn bowls for the first time in the 1990 Commonwealth Games.

Athlete	Event	Round-robin								Final	Rank
Athlete	Event	Played	Won	Draw	Lost	For	Against	Points	Rank	Final	Rank
Sreenivasa Pai	Men's singles	7	0	0	7	55	175	0	8	Did not qualify	
Basant Rampuria; Vipin Dhawan	Men's pairs	7	2	1	4	145	158	5	5	Did not qualify	
Gopiram Sharma; Pratap Bengani; Rajendra Bengani; Surya Saigal	Men's fours	7	1	0	6	103	182	2	8	Did not qualify	

== Shooting ==
India competed in 17 shooting events at the 1990 Commonwealth Games and won five medals including one gold medal.

Athlete	Event	Points	Rank
Balijit Singh	50 m free pistol	527	16
Ram Lal	50 m free pistol	522	19
Balijit Singh; Ram Lal	50 m free pistol – pairs	1063	7
Ashok Pandit	25 m centre-fire pistol	583	1st place, gold medalist(s)
Surinder Marwah	25 m centre-fire pistol	577	2nd place, silver medalist(s)
Ashok Pandit; Surinder Marwah	25 m centre-fire pistol – pairs	1142	3rd place, bronze medalist(s)
Gangadhar Sharma	25 m rapid-fire pistol	547	11
Ashok Pandit	10 m air pistol	568	6
Ashok Pandit; Surinder Marwah	10 m air pistol – pairs	1108	8
Soma Dutta	10 m air rifle	576	4
Bhagirath Samai	10 m air rifle	558	15
Soma Dutta; Bhagirath Samai	10 m air rifle – pairs	1148	3rd place, bronze medalist(s)
Joydip Das	50 m rifle prone	578	18
Hans Rana	50 m rifle prone	565	27
Joydip Das; Hans Rana	50 m rifle prone – pairs	1165	9
T. C. Palangappa	50 m rifle three-positions	1118	12
Soma Dutta	50 m rifle three-positions	1143	3rd place, bronze medalist(s)
T. C. Palangappa; Soma Dutta	50 m rifle three-positions – pairs	2245	4
Mansher Singh	Clay pigeon trap	175	8
Samir Thapar	Clay pigeon trap	148	25
Mansher Singh; Samir Thapar	Trap – pairs	171	7
Harinder Bedi	Skeet	169	18
Rao Inderjit Singh	Skeet	162	23
Harinder Bedi; Rao Inderjit Singh	Skeet – pairs	174	8

== Weightlifting ==
India competed in ten weightlifting events at the 1990 Commonwealth Games. Indian weightlifters won 27 medals, including 12 gold, eight silver, and seven bronze medals.

Athlete	Event	Snatch		Clean & jerk		Overall	
Athlete	Event	Result	Rank	Result	Rank	Result	Rank
Raghavan Chanderasekaran	Flyweight 52 kg	105.0 kg	1st place, gold medalist(s)	127.5 kg	1st place, gold medalist(s)	232.5 kg	1st place, gold medalist(s)
Velu Govindraj	Flyweight 52 kg	95.0 kg	2nd place, silver medalist(s)	117.5 kg	3rd place, bronze medalist(s)	212.5 kg	2nd place, silver medalist(s)
Ponnuswamy Rangaswamy	Bantamweight 56 kg	110.0 kg	1st place, gold medalist(s)	137.5 kg	1st place, gold medalist(s)	247.5 kg	1st place, gold medalist(s)
Gopal Maruthachelam	Bantamweight 56 kg	102.5 kg	3	125.0 kg	2nd place, silver medalist(s)	227.5 kg	3rd place, bronze medalist(s)
Parvesh Chander Sharma	Featherweight 60 kg	112.5 kg	2nd place, silver medalist(s)	145.0 kg	1st place, gold medalist(s)	257.5 kg	1st place, gold medalist(s)
Kumarasan Sudalaimani	Featherweight 60 kg	110.0 kg	3rd place, bronze medalist(s)	142.5 kg	3rd place, bronze medalist(s)	252.5 kg	3rd place, bronze medalist(s)
Paramjit Sharma	Lightweight 67.5 kg	130.0 kg	1st place, gold medalist(s)	165.0 kg	1st place, gold medalist(s)	295.0 kg	1st place, gold medalist(s)
Subratakumar Paul	Lightweight 67.5 kg	DQ					
Karnadhar Mondal	Middleweight 75 kg	135.0 kg	1st place, gold medalist(s)	170.0 kg	2nd place, silver medalist(s)	305.0 kg	2nd place, silver medalist(s)
Soronamuthu Karupaswamy	Light Heavyweight 82.5 kg	132.5 kg	4	182.5 kg	2nd place, silver medalist(s)	315.0 kg	4
