= Weightlifting at the 1986 Commonwealth Games =

- Venue: Edinburgh Playhouse
- Location: Edinburgh, Scotland
- Dates: 24 July to 2 August 1986

Weightlifting at the 1986 Commonwealth Games was the 10th appearance of Weightlifting at the Commonwealth Games. The events were held in Edinburgh, Scotland, from 24 July to 2 August 1986. The competition featured contests in ten weight classes.

The events took place in the Edinburgh Playhouse on Greenside Place.

Australia topped the weightlifting medal table by virtue of winning four gold medals.

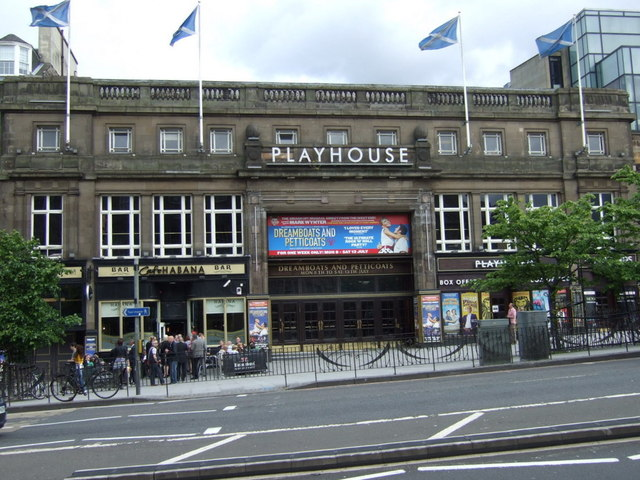
The Playhouse in 2013

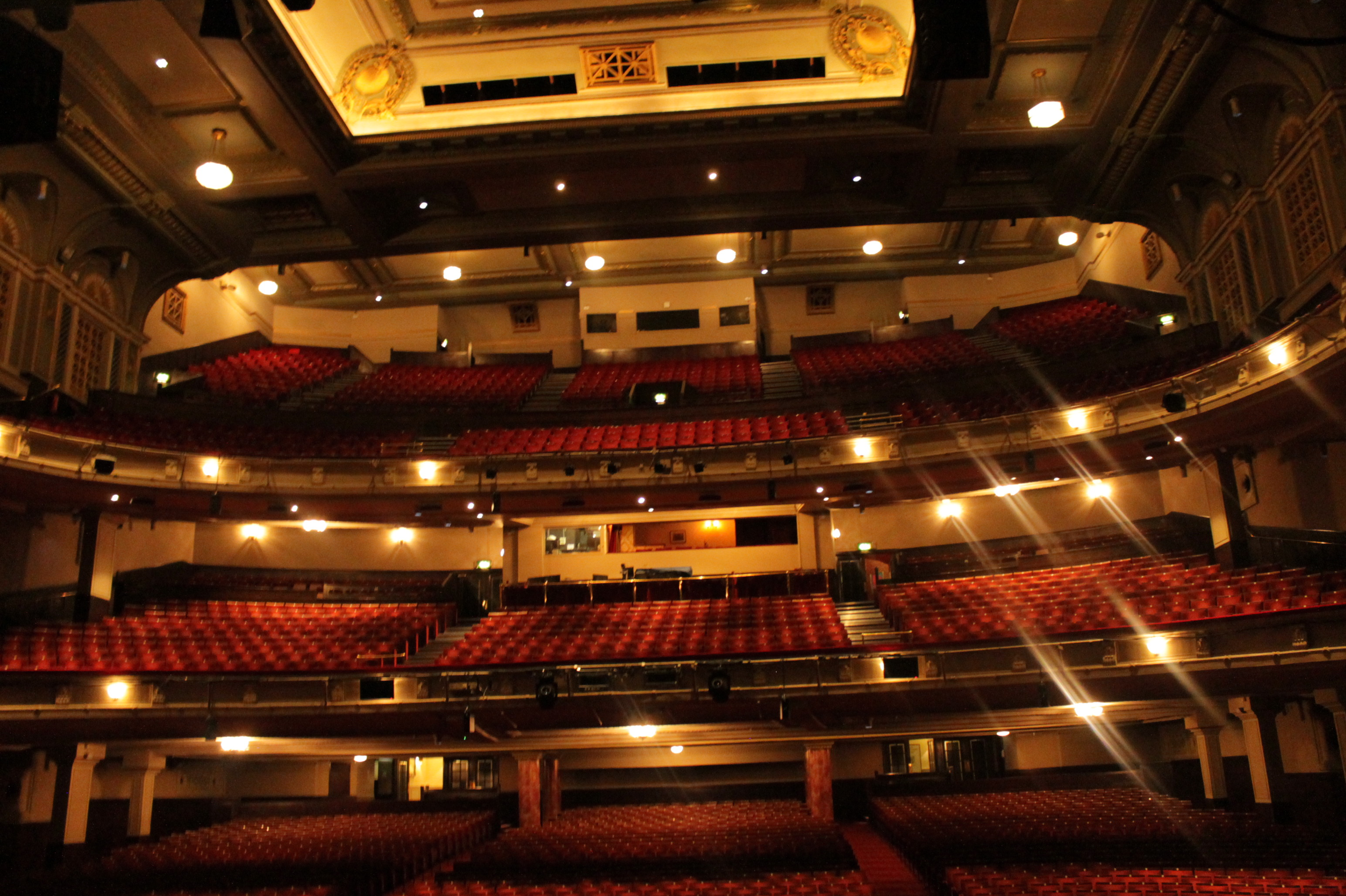
The interior in 2023

== Medal table ==
* Host nation (Scotland)

Medals won by nation with totals, ranked by number of golds—sortable
Rank	Nation	Gold	Silver	Bronze	Total
1	Australia	4	4	1	9
2	Canada	2	2	2	6
2	England	2	2	2	6
4	Wales	2	0	3	5
5	Scotland*	0	1	1	2
6	New Zealand	0	1	0	1
7	Singapore	0	0	1	1
Totals (7 entries)		10	10	10	30

== Medal winners ==
Event	Gold	Silver	Bronze
Flyweight 52kg	Greg Hayman; Australia	Charlie Revolta; Scotland	Alan Ogilvie; Scotland
Bantamweight 56kg	Nick Voukelatos; Australia	Clayton Chelley; New Zealand	Teo Yong Joo; Singapore
Featherweight 60kg	Ray Williams; Wales	David Lowenstein; Australia	Jeffrey Brice; Wales
Lightweight 67.5kg	Dean Willey; England	Ron Laycock; Australia	Langis Côté; Canada
Middleweight 75kg	Bill Stellios; Australia	Louis Payer; Canada	Neil Taylor; Wales
Light Heavyweight 82.5kg	Dave Morgan; Wales	Robert Kabbas; Australia	Peter May; England
Middle Heavyweight 90kg	Keith Boxell; England	David Mercer; England	Guy Greavette; Canada
Sub Heavyweight 100kg	Denis Garon; Canada	Duncan Dawkins; England	Andrew Saxton; England
Heavyweight 110 kg	Kevin Roy; Canada	Gino Frantangelo; Australia	Andrew Davies; Wales
Super Heavyweight +110kg	Dean Lukin; Australia	David Bolduc; Canada	Charles Garzarella; Australia

== Results ==
=== Flyweight 52kg ===
Pos	Athlete	Kg
1	Greg Hayman (AUS)	212.5
2	Charlie Revolta (SCO)	185.0
3	Alan Ogilvie (SCO)	177.5

=== Bantamweight 56kg ===
Pos	Athlete	Kg
1	Nick Voukelatos (AUS)	245.0
2	Clayton Chelley (NZL)	219.5
3	Teo Yong Joo (SIN)	215.0
4	John McNiven (SCO)	195.0
5	Christopher Edward (WAL)	195.0
6	Sabhijinder Singh Hayer (ENG)	withdrew

=== Featherweight 60kg ===
Pos	Athlete	Kg
1	Ray Williams (WAL)	252.5
2	David Lowenstein (AUS)	250.0
3	Jeffrey Brice (WAL)	235.0
4	Daniel Richard Mudd (AUS)	115
5	Geoff Laws (ENG)	112.5
6	Leong Hong Keong (SIN)	no score

=== Lightweight 67.5kg ===
Pos	Athlete	Kg
1	Dean Willey (ENG)	315.0
2	Ron Laycock (AUS)	307.5
3	Langis Côté (CAN)	290.0
4	Norman Cunningham (SCO)	227.5
5	Graham Cunningham (SCO)	195.0

=== Middleweight 75kg ===
Pos	Athlete	Kg
1	Bill Stellios (AUS)	302.5
2	Louis Payer (CAN)	300
3	Neil Taylor (WAL)	270
4	Jim Strachan (SCO)	235
5	John McNiven Jr. (SCO)	230

=== Light Heavyweight 82.5kg ===
Pos	Athlete	Kg
1	Dave Morgan (WAL)	350.0
2	Robert Kabbas (AUS)	325.0
3	Peter May (ENG)	317.5
4	Tony Supple (ENG)	310.0
5	Gilles Poirier (CAN)	305
6	Neale McDevitt (CAN)	305
7	Michael Bernard (NZL)	no weight

=== Middle Heavyweight 90kg ===
Pos	Athlete	Kg
1	Keith Boxell (ENG)	350.0
2	David Mercer (ENG)	342.5
3	Guy Greavette (CAN)	340.0
4	Gabriel Leduc (CAN)	320.0
5	Charles Murray (SCO)	285.0
6	Gareth Hives (WAL)	280.0
7	Mike Tererui (COK)	215.0
8	Allister Nalder (NZL)	no weight

=== Sub Heavyweight 100kg ===
Pos	Athlete	Kg
1	Denis Garon (CAN)	360.0
2	Duncan Dawkins (ENG)	332.5
3	Andrew Saxton (ENG)	327.5
4	Paramajit Gill (CAN)	325.0
5	Kevin Blake (NZL)	322.5

=== Heavyweight 110kg ===
Pos	Athlete	Kg
1	Kevin Roy (CAN)	375.0
2	Luigi Carmine Fratangelo (AUS)	372.5
3	Andrew Davies (WAL)	370.0
4	Mark Groombridge (ENG)	355.0

=== Super Heavyweight +110kg ===
Pos	Athlete	Kg
1	Dean Lukin (AUS)	392.5
2	David Bolduc (CAN)	347.5
3	Charles Garzarella (AUS)	342.5
4	Steven Wilson (WAL)	340.0
5	Kenneth Webster (WAL)	310.0

== See also ==
- List of Commonwealth Games medallists in weightlifting
