= India at the Commonwealth Games =

- CG code: IND
- CGA: Indian Olympic Association
- Website: olympic.ind.in
- Medals Ranked 4th: Gold 215 Silver 207 Bronze 180 Total 602

Commonwealth Games appearances (overview)
- 1934; 1938; 1950; 1954; 1958; 1962; 1966; 1970; 1974; 1978; 1982; 1986; 1990; 1994; 1998; 2002; 2006; 2010; 2014; 2018; 2022; 2026; 2030

India made its debut at the second Commonwealth Games in 1934. It has since competed in all except four editions of the Commonwealth Games. India hosted the 2010 Commonwealth Games at Delhi, and will host the 2030 Commonwealth Games in Ahmedabad.

After the 2026 Commonwealth Games, India had won 602 medals (215 gold, 207 silver, 180 bronze) and is ranked fourth at the All-time Commonwealth Games medal table. The most successful event for India is shooting, in which it has won 135 medals including 63 gold medals.

== History ==
=== Pre-independence (1930s) ===
India debuted at the Commonwealth Games, then called the British Empire Games, back in 1934 as British India. The Indian contingent at the 1934 Games at London featured six athletes, who competed in 10 track and field events and one wrestling event. India won a single bronze medal at its debut Commonwealth Games, with wrestler Rashid Anwar clinching the bronze medal in the men's 74 kg freestyle wrestling event. India made its second appearance at the 1938 British Empire Games at Sydney, where it made its debut in the cycling events, and did not win any medals.

=== Early years post-independence (1950s–1970s) ===
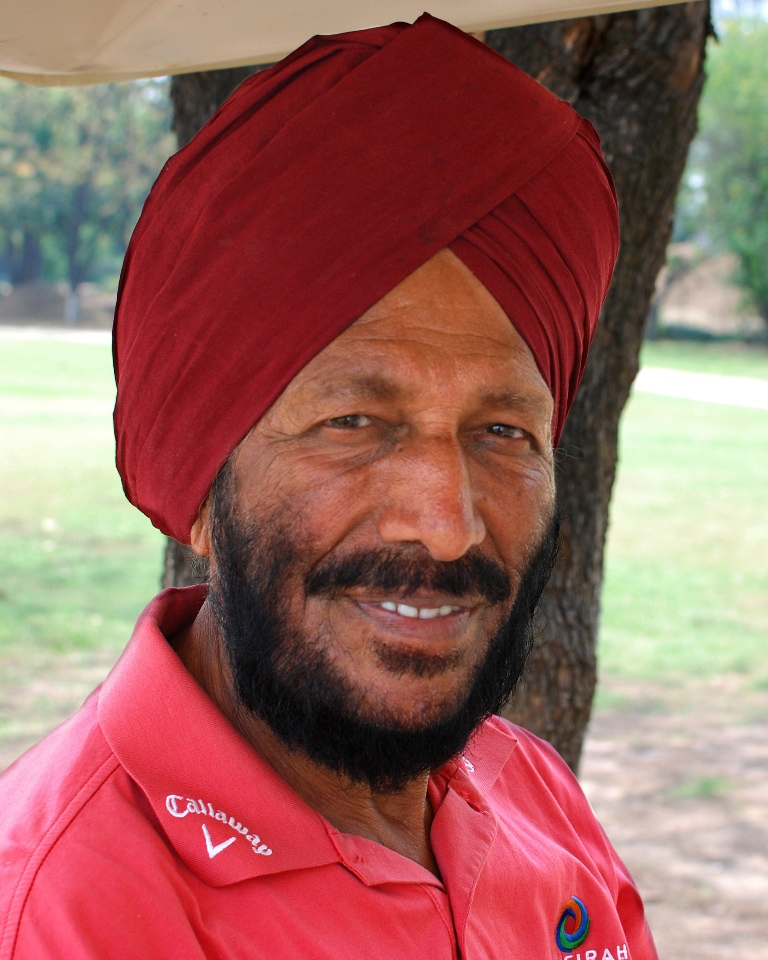
Milkha Singh was the first Indian to win a gold medal at the Commonwealth Games

Post India's independence in 1947, the country did not compete in the next Commonwealth Games in 1950. It competed as an independent nation for the first time in the 1954 British Empire and Commonwealth Games at Vancouver. It mainly took part in the athletics events, and did not win any medals. In the 1958 Games at Cardiff, India fared better, winning two gold medals and a silver medal to finish eighth in the medal table. Sprinter Milkha Singh became the first Indian to win a gold medal at the Commonwealth Games, clinching the top spot in the men's 440 yard event. Heavyweight wrestler Lila Ram won the other gold medal for India in the men's 100kg freestyle category. In the 1958 Games, track and field athletes Stephanie D'Souza and Elizabeth Davenport became the first Indian women to compete at the Commonwealth Games. India did not take part in the 1962 Games in Perth.

India returned to the competition at the 1966 Games at Kingston, Jamaica, in which it won ten medals including three gold medals. The country won seven of these medals in wrestling, including all three gold medals, and its first ever medal in badminton with Dinesh Khanna winning the silver medal. Indian wrestlers continued to dominate the sport in the 1970s, with all the country's gold medals in the 1970 (five) and 1974 (four) editions coming from the sport. While Indian wrestlers continued to contribute significantly to the country's medal tally, winning a further seven medals across the 1974 and 1978 editions, India won its gold medals in badminton and weightlifting at the 1978 Games in Edmonton. Prakash Padukone won the men's singles event in badminton, while Ekambaram Karunakaran won the gold medal in the men's flyweight in weightlifting. Badminton players Ami Ghia and Kanwal Thakar Singh were the first Indian women to win a Commonwealth Games medal, winning the women's doubles bronze during the 1978 Games.

=== Late 20th century (1980s–1990s) ===
India took part in the 1982 Commonwealth Games in Brisbane, winning 16 medals including five gold medals and its first ever medal in shooting. However, India boycotted the 1986 edition held in Edinburgh, as a part of the wider boycott, to protest Britain's sporting links with apartheid South Africa. India achieved its best performance till date at the Commonwealth Games in the 1990 edition in Auckland, winning 32 medals including 13 gold medals. Indian weightlifters dominated the medal haul with 24 medals including 12 gold medals. Raghavan Chanderasekaran, Ponnuswamy Rangaswamy, and Paramjit Sharma won three gold medals each, and Parvesh Chander Sharma won two golds and a silver.

In the 1994 edition in Victoria, British Columbia, India won 24 medals including six golds, with Jaspal Rana and Badathala Adisekhar winning two gold medals each. Raghavan won three silver medals to add to his tally, to become the most decorated Indian male weightlifter at the Commonwealth Games. In the 1998 Commonwealth Games in Kuala Lumpur, India won 25 medals including seven gold medals, with 13 in weightlifting and seven in shooting.

=== Early 21st century (2000s–2010s) ===
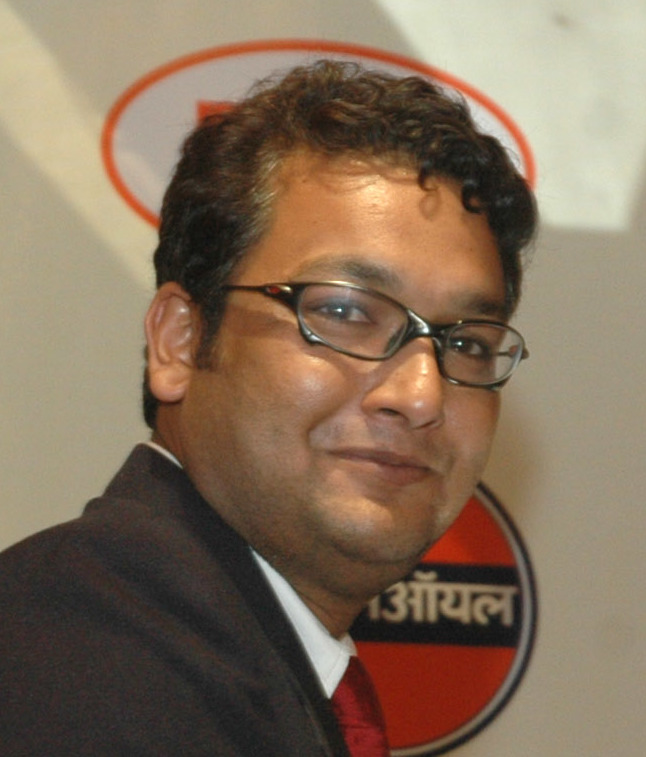
Jaspal Rana is the most decorated Indian athlete at the Commonwealth Games with 15 medals including nine golds

Since the 2000s, India consistently finished among the top five countries in the medals table. In the 2002 Commonwealth Games at Manchester, India recorded its best ever finish till then, winning 69 medals including 30 gold medals, and was placed fourth in the overall medal table. The India women's hockey team won the country's first gold medal in hockey. India won 23 medals including 13 gold medals in shooting, and 27 medals including 11 gold medals in weightlifting. In weightlifting, Kunjarani Devi, Sanamacha Chanu, and Shailaja Pujari won three gold medals each, while Pratima Kumari won two gold medals. Jaspal Rana became the most decorated Indian athlete at the Commonwealth Games, with 15 medals including nine golds, of which six medals including four golds were won at the 2002 Games. Shooter Anjali Bhagwat won four gold medals, and became the most decorated female Indian athlete at the Games.

In the 2006 edition, India won 50 medals including 22 gold medals, of which 27 medals including 15 golds came in shooting. Shooter Samresh Jung won seven medals including five gold medals in the 2006 edition, and took his overall tally at the Commonwealth Games to seven gold medals. Rana added another gold medal, and became the first Indian to win gold medals in four consecutive Commonwealth Games.

In the 2010 edition hosted by India, the country sent its largest contingent of 619 athletes, and delivered its best ever performance, winning 101 medals including 38 gold medals, and finishing second in the overall medal table. The Indian shooters played a crucial role during India's best showing at the Commonwealth Games, winning 30 medals including 14 golds, with Indian wrestlers winning 19 medals including 10 golds. Shooter Gagan Narang won four gold medals to add to his four golds won in the 2002 edition.

At the 2014 Commonwealth Games in Glasgow, India fielded a 215-member contingent, and won 64 medals including 15 gold medals. Shooting, weightlifting, and wrestling were the most successful sports, earning 17, 14, and 13 medals respectively. At the 2018 Commonwealth Games in Gold Coast, India won 66 medals including 26 gold medals, and finished third in the overall medal table. Shooting again contributed the most number of medals to India's tally at the Games. Table tennis player Manika Batra was the most successful Indian with four medals.

=== Later years (2020s–present) ===
At the 2022 Commonwealth Games at Birmingham, India finished fourth in the medal table with 60 medals including 21 gold medals. Wrestling contributed the most to India's medal tally with 12 medals including six golds. Paddler Sharath Kamal won four medals including three gold medals to take his overall medal tally at the Commonwealth Games to 13 medals including seven golds. Wrestler Vinesh Phogat became the first Indian woman to win gold medals at three successive Commonwealth Games.

At the 2026 Commonwealth Games at Glasgow, India finished fourth in the medal table with 39 medals (13 gold, 17 silver, 9 bronze). India won the most medals in boxing, winning ten medals including seven golds, the most by any nation in the sport in a single Commonwealth Games. Indian para athletes had their best performance at a single edition, winning seven medals including three gold medals. Weightlifter Mirabai Chanu became the first Indian female athlete to win medals at four successive Commonwealth Games. India had its best ever performance in judo with three medals, including its first ever gold medals won by Asmita Dey and Harsh Singh. In athletics, Gulveer Singh became the first Indian track and field athlete to win two individual medals at a single Commonwealth Games, and Tejaswin Shankar won India's first ever Commonwealth Games medal in decathlon.

== Host ==
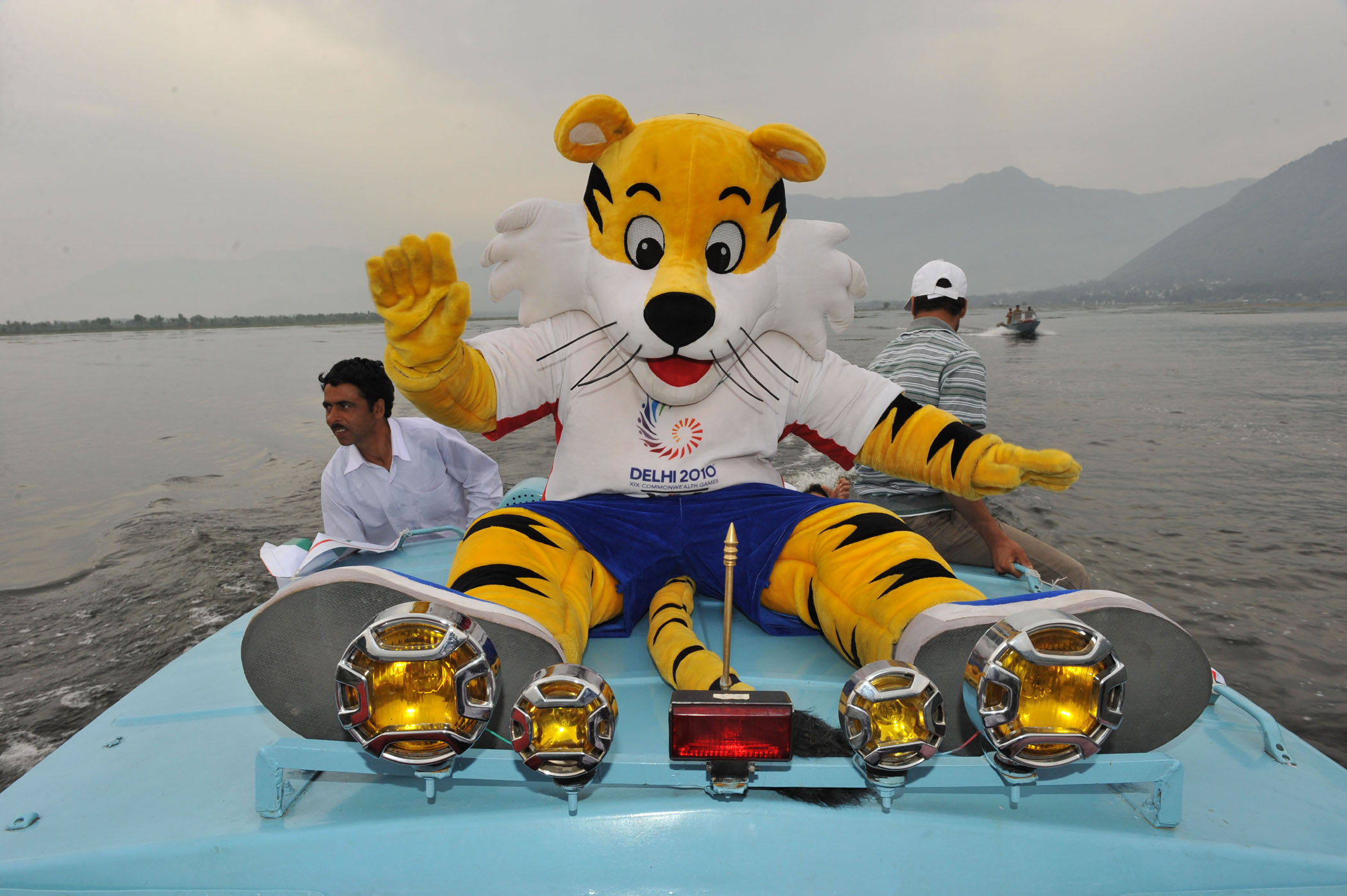
Shera, the mascot of the 2010 Commonwealth Games held at Delhi

Delhi bid for hosting the 1990 and 1994 Commonwealth Games but lost to Auckland and Victoria respectively. The host city of the 2010 Commonwealth Games was selected on 14 November 2003 during the Commonwealth Games Federation General Assembly in Montego Bay, Jamaica. Delhi, India competed with Hamilton, Canada, for the rights to host the Games. India's bid was under the motto New Frontiers and Friendships. Delhi won the hosting rights over Hamilton with a 46-22 vote, and hosted the 2010 Commonwealth Games from 3 to 14 October 2010.

India will host the Games again in 2030, at Ahmedabad. The bid evaluation commission of Commonwealth Sport nominated Ahmedabad as its preferred candidate on 15 October 2025, pending a final vote to be held at its general assembly in Glasgow on 26 November, which was unanimously approved.

== Medal table ==
Host country

Year	Gold	Silver	Bronze	Total	Position
(Canada) 1930 Hamilton	Did not participate				
(England) 1934 London	0	0	1	1	12th
(Australia) 1938 Sydney	0	0	0	0	–
(New Zealand) 1950 Auckland	Did not participate				
(Canada) 1954 Vancouver	0	0	0	0	–
(Wales) 1958 Cardiff	2	1	0	3	8th
(Australia) 1962 Perth	Did not participate				
(Jamaica) 1966 Kingston	3	4	3	10	8th
(Scotland) 1970 Edinburgh	5	3	4	12	6th
(New Zealand) 1974 Christchurch	4	8	3	15	6th
(Canada) 1978 Edmonton	5	5	5	15	6th
(Australia) 1982 Brisbane	5	8	3	16	6th
(Scotland) 1986 Edinburgh	Did not participate				
(New Zealand) 1990 Auckland	13	8	11	32	5th
(Canada) 1994 Victoria	6	11	7	24	6th
(Malaysia) 1998 Kuala Lumpur	7	10	8	25	7th
(England) 2002 Manchester	30	22	17	69	4th
(Australia) 2006 Melbourne	22	17	11	50	4th
(India) 2010 New Delhi	38	27	36	101	2nd
(Scotland) 2014 Glasgow	15	30	19	64	5th
(Australia) 2018 Gold Coast	26	20	20	66	3rd
(England) 2022 Birmingham	21	16	23	60	4th
(Scotland) 2026 Glasgow	13	17	9	39	4th
(India) 2030 Ahmedabad	TBD				TBD
Total	215	207	180	602	4th

=== Medals by sport ===
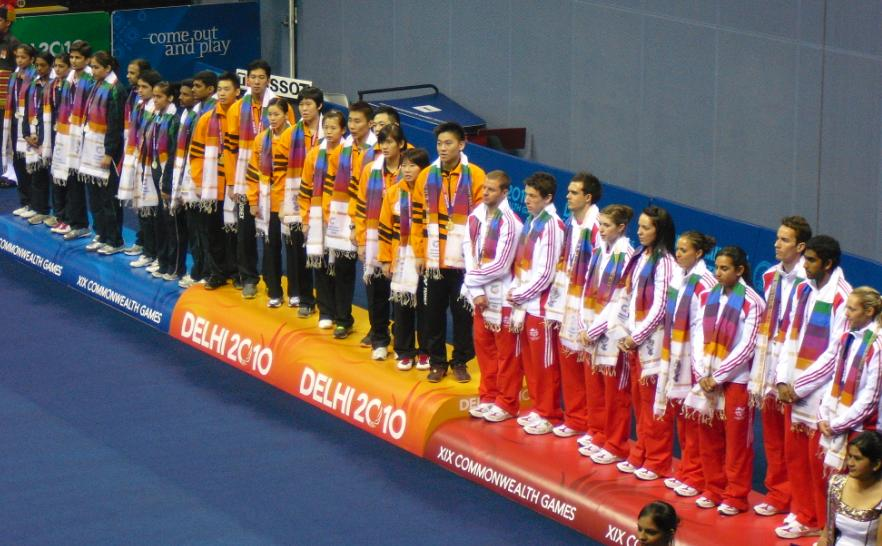
Medalists of the Badminton mixed team competition at the 2010 Commonwealth Games in Delhi. From left: India (silver), Malaysia (gold), and England (bronze).

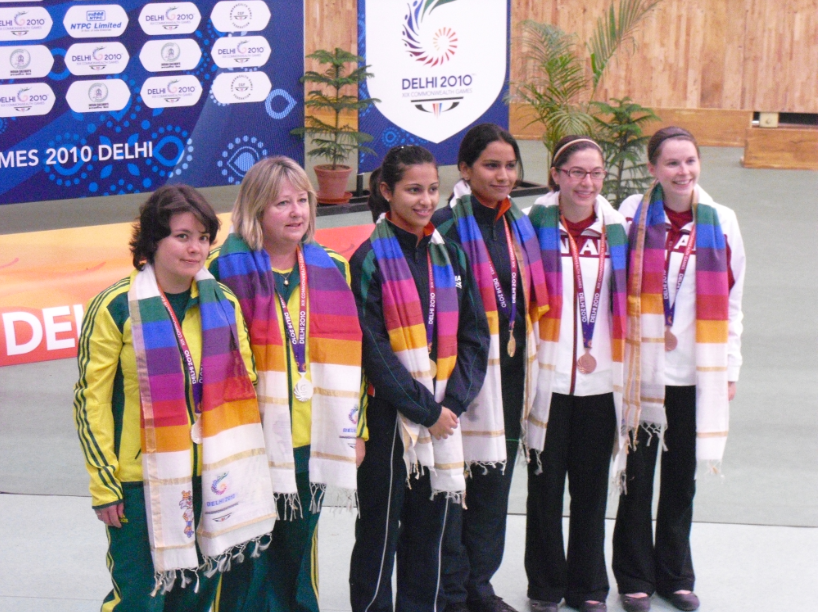
Medalists of the 10-metre air pistol pairs women at the 2010 Commonwealth Games in Delhi. From left: Dina Aspandiyarova, Pamela McKenzie, Heena Sidhu, Annu Raj Singh, Dorothy Ludwig, and Lynda Hare.

Sport	Rank	Gold	Silver	Bronze	Total
Shooting	2	63	44	28	135
Wrestling	2	49	39	26	114
Weightlifting (Note: India won a silver and a bronze medal in Powerlifting at the 2014 Commonwealth Games when it was contested as a part of Weightlifting. From the 2018 Commonwealth Games, Para powerlifting is contested as a separate sport.)	2	47	57	37	141
Boxing	6	18	16	20	54
Badminton	3	10	8	13	31
Athletics	13	9	21	22	52
Table tennis	2	10	5	13	28
Archery	2	3	1	4	8
Judo	5	2	6	7	15
Field hockey	2	1	4	1	6
Squash	5	1	2	2	5
Tennis	2	1	1	2	4
Lawn bowls	11	1	1	0	2
Para powerlifting	6	0	0	2	2
Gymnastics	12	0	1	2	3
Cricket	3	0	1	0	1
Swimming	17	0	0	1	1
Overall	4	215	207	180	602
