= India at the 1954 British Empire and Commonwealth Games =

- CG code: IND
- CGA: Indian Olympic Association
- Website: olympic.ind.in

in Vancouver, British Columbia, Canada
- Competitors: 4 in 1 sport
- Medals Ranked -th: Gold 0 Silver 0 Bronze 0 Total 0

British Empire and Commonwealth Games appearances
- 1934; 1938; 1950; 1954; 1958; 1962; 1966; 1970; 1974; 1978; 1982; 1986; 1990; 1994; 1998; 2002; 2006; 2010; 2014; 2018; 2022; 2026; 2030

India competed at the 1954 British Empire and Commonwealth Games, held in Vancouver, from 30 July to 7 August 1954. It was the country's third appearance overall and the first as an independent nation at the Commonwealth Games. The Indian contingent consisted of four athletes who competed in five events in a single sport. India did not win any medals at the Games.

== Competitors ==
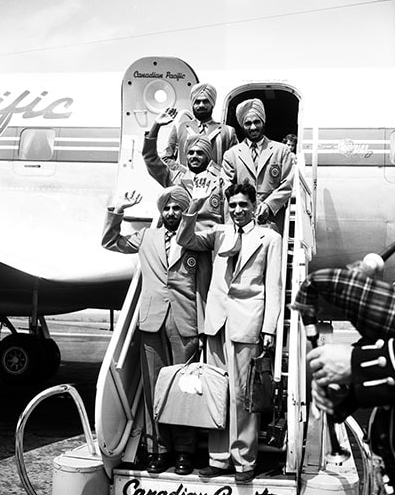
The Indian contingent arriving at the 1954 British Empire and Commonwealth Games

The Indian contingent consisted of four athletes who competed in five events in a single sport.

Sport	Men	Women	Total
Athletics	4	0	4

== Athletics ==
The Indian athletics contingent consisted of four men competing in five events.

=== Track ===
Athlete	Event	Heat		Semifinal		Final	
Athlete	Event	Result	Rank	Result	Rank	Result	Rank
Joginder Singh Dhanaor	Men's 440 yds	DNF		Did not qualify			
Sarwan Singh Bangham	Men's 120 yds hurdles	15.5	4	Did not qualify			

=== Field ===
Athlete	Event	Result	Rank
Ajit Singh Balla	Men's high jump	6 ft 0 in (1.83 m)	11
Parduman Singh Brar	Men's discus throw	135 ft 8 1/2 in (41.36 m)	10
Parduman Singh Brar	Men's shot put	45 ft 6 1/2 in (13.88 m)	7
