= Odusanya =

Nigerian given name

- Gender: Male
- Language: Yoruba

Origin
- Origin: Nigerian
- Meaning: "Ifá repaid my suffering"
- Region of origin: South-west Nigeria

Odusanya is a Nigerian surname of Yoruba origin meaning "Ifá repaid my suffering,".

== Notable people with the surname ==
- Ronke Odusanya (born 1973) Nigerian film actress and producer.
- Muyiwa Odusanya (born 1967) Nigerian weightlifter.
- Sisi Yemmie born as Yemisi Sophia Odusanya (born 1984) Nigerian YouTuber.
