= Weightlifting at the 1988 Summer Olympics – Men's 52 kg =

Weightlifting at the Olympics

Men's 52 kg at the Games of the XXIV Olympiad
- Venue: Olympic Weightlifting Gymnasium
- Date: 18 September 1988
- Competitors: 24 from 18 nations

Medalists
1st place, gold medalist(s)		Sevdalin Marinov	Bulgaria
2nd place, silver medalist(s)		Chun Byung-kwan	South Korea
3rd place, bronze medalist(s)		He Zhuoqiang	China

The men's 52 kg weightlifting event was the lightest event at the weightlifting competition of the 1988 Summer Olympics, limiting competitors to a maximum of 52 kilograms of body mass. The competition took place on 18 September, and participants were divided in two groups. Each lifter performed in both the snatch and clean and jerk lifts, with the final score being the sum of the lifter's best result in each. The athlete received three attempts in each of the two lifts; the score for the lift was the heaviest weight successfully lifted.

== Results ==
Rank	Athlete	Group	Body weight	Snatch (kg)				Clean & Jerk (kg)				Total
Rank	Athlete	Group	Body weight	1	2	3	Result	1	2	3	Result	Total
1st place, gold medalist(s)	Sevdalin Marinov (BUL)	A	51.85	112.5	117.5	120	120	142.5	147.5	150	150	270 WR,OR
2nd place, silver medalist(s)	Chun Byung-kwan (KOR)	A	51.50	107.5	112.5	~~115~~	112.5	140	147.5	~~157.5~~	147.5	260
3rd place, bronze medalist(s)	He Zhuoqiang (CHN)	A	51.45	~~112.5~~	112.5	~~117.5~~	112.5	~~145~~	~~145~~	145	145	257.5
4	Zhang Shoulie (CHN)	A	51.50	110	115	~~117.5~~	115	137.5	142.5	~~145~~	142.5	257.5
5	Jacek Gutowski (POL)	A	51.45	112.5	~~117.5~~	~~117.5~~	112.5	~~135~~	~~135~~	135	135	247.5
6	Traian Ciharean (ROU)	A	51.65	110	~~115~~	~~115~~	110	~~130~~	130	~~140~~	130	240
7	Bela Olah (HUN)	A	51.65	102.5	107.5	~~110~~	107.5	130	~~135~~	~~135~~	130	237.5
8	Kazushito Manabe (JPN)	A	51.60	105	~~110~~	~~110~~	105	120	125	~~130~~	125	230
9	Hwang In-dong (KOR)	A	51.80	~~95~~	95	100	100	~~130~~	130	~~135~~	130	230
10	Humberto Fuentes (VEN)	A	51.75	~~100~~	~~100~~	100	100	~~127.5~~	127.5	~~132.5~~	127.5	227.5
11	Gurunathan Muthuswamy (IND)	B	51.95	95	100	102.5	102.5	120	125	~~127.5~~	125	227.5
12	José Luis Martínez (ESP)	B	51.75	95	~~100~~	100	100	120	125	~~127.5~~	125	225
13	José Andrés Ibáñez (ESP)	B	51.70	~~95~~	95	~~100~~	95	120	125	127.5	127.5	222.5
14	Chiang Ming-hsiung (TPE)	B	51.90	~~92.5~~	92.5	~~95~~	92.5	122.5	130	~~140~~	130	222.5
15	Sodikin (INA)	B	51.85	~~95~~	95	~~100~~	95	122.5	~~127.5~~	~~127.5~~	122.5	217.5
16	Levent Erdogan (TUR)	B	51.85	92.5	~~115~~	~~115~~	92.5	117.5	122.5	125	125	217.5
17	Yoshinori Namiki (JPN)	B	51.70	95	100	~~102.5~~	100	115	~~120~~	~~122.5~~	115	215
18	Gregory Hayman (AUS)	B	51.55	87.5	~~92.5~~	92.5	92.5	115	~~120~~	~~120~~	115	207.5
19	Raghavan Chanderasekaran (IND)	B	51.90	92.5	~~97.5~~	~~97.5~~	92.5	~~115~~	115	~~120~~	115	207.5
20	Gregorio Colonia (PHI)	B	52.00	90	~~95~~	~~95~~	90	115	~~120~~	~~120~~	115	205
21	Khodr Olaywan (LIB)	B	51.70	80	85	~~87.5~~	85	100	~~105~~	~~105~~	100	185
22	Bharat Sawad (NEP)	B	51.30	75	~~82.5~~	~~82.5~~	75	95	105	~~107.5~~	105	180
—	Ramadan Aly (EGY)	B	51.95	95	~~100~~	100	100	~~117.5~~	~~117.5~~	~~120~~	—	—
—	Chung Yung-chi (TPE)	B	51.90	~~97.5~~	~~97.5~~	97.5	97.5	—	—	—	—	—

== Sources ==
- The Official Report of the Games of the XXIV Olympiad Seoul 1988 Volume Two (PDF) (PDF). p. 642.
