= Boxell =

Boxell is a surname. Notable people with the surname include:

- Keith Boxell (born 1968), English weightlifter
- Lee Boxell (born 1973), disappeared from the London Borough of Sutton aged 15
