= Swalwell =

Swalwell may refer to:

- Swalwell, Tyne and Wear, English village in Gateshead, historically in County Durham
  - Swalwell railway station, active in Gateshead between 1868 and 1960
- Swalwell, Alberta, Canadian hamlet in Kneehill County
- Swalwell (surname)

== See also ==
- Swalwell Hopping, Geordie folk song written in early 19th century England
- Swalwell Cottage, historic 1892 house in Everett, Washington, United States
