= Muyiwa =

- Gender: Male
- Language: Yoruba

Origin
- Origin: Nigerian
- Meaning: "Brought this" or "Brought honour"
- Region of origin: South-west Nigeria

Other names
- Variant forms: Olúmúyìwá; Olúmúyìíwá

MuyiwaMuyiwa is a Nigerian given name of Yoruba origin meaning "Brought this" or "Brought honour," it is a diminutive of names like "Olúmúyìwá" or "Adémúyìwá." It conveys the idea of bringing something valuable or honourable, The name is derived from “mú” (bring), “èyí” (this), “wa” (come), and “iyì” (honour), morphologically written as Múyìwá. Variant of the name include Olúmúyìwá, Olúmúyìíwá.

== Notable people with the name ==
- Muyiwa Ademola (born 1973) Nigerian actor, film producer and director.
- Muyiwa Oki Nigerian-British architect.
- Muyiwa Olarewaju British gospel singer.
- Muyiwa Odusanya (born 1967) Nigerian weightlifter.

=== Surname ===
- Joke Muyiwa (born 1963) Nigerian actress.
- Olabiran Muyiwa (1998) footballer.
