= Yoshinori Namiki =

Japanese weightlifter

Personal information
- Nationality: Japanese
- Born: 15 January 1963 (age 62)

Sport
- Sport: Weightlifting

Yoshinori Namiki (born 15 January 1963) is a Japanese weightlifter. He competed in the men's flyweight event at the 1988 Summer Olympics.
