= India at the 1938 British Empire Games =

- CG code: IND
- CGA: Indian Olympic Association
- Website: olympic.ind.in

in Sydney, Australia
- Competitors: 1 in 1 sport
- Medals Ranked -th: Gold 0 Silver 0 Bronze 0 Total 0

British Empire Games appearances
- 1934; 1938; 1950; 1954; 1958; 1962; 1966; 1970; 1974; 1978; 1982; 1986; 1990; 1994; 1998; 2002; 2006; 2010; 2014; 2018; 2022; 2026; 2030

British India competed at the 1938 British Empire Games, held in Sydney, from 5 to 12 February 1938. It was the country's second appearance at the British Empire Games. The Indian contingent consisted of a single athlete, Janki Das, who competed in four events in a single sport. India did not win a medal at the Games.

== Competitors ==
The Indian contingent consisted of a single athlete, Janki Das, who competed in four events in a single sport.

Sport	Men	Women	Total
Cycling	1	—N/a	1

== Cycling ==
Athlete	Event	Result	Rank
Janki Das	Sprint 1000 yd	1:22.8	14
Janki Das	10-mile scratch	DNF	
Janki Das	Road race	DNF	

Athlete	Event	Heat	Repechage	Semifinal	Final	
Athlete	Event	Opponent Result	Opponent Result	Opponent Result	Opponent Result	Rank
Janki Das	Time trial	Giles (NZL); L	Did not advance			
