= Swalwell (surname) =

Swalwell is a surname. The surname originates from the village of Swalwell in Tyne and Wear, England. Notable people with the surname include:

- Eric Swalwell (born 1980), American politician
- Ken Swalwell (born c. 1930), Canadian football player and discus thrower
- Reginald Swalwell (1873–1930), British cricketer
