= Athletics at the 1954 British Empire and Commonwealth Games – Men's discus throw =

Men's discus throw at the Commonwealth Games
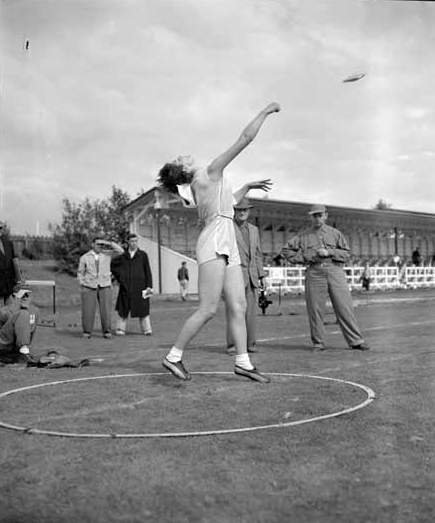
- A competitor throws at the games.
- Venue: Empire Stadium
- Dates: 4 August

The men's discus throw event at the 1954 British Empire and Commonwealth Games was held on 4 August at the Empire Stadium in Vancouver, Canada.

== Results ==
Rank	Name	Nationality	Result	Notes
1st place, gold medalist(s)	Fanie du Plessis	South Africa	169 ft 7 1/2 in (51.70 m)	
2nd place, silver medalist(s)	Roy Pella	Canada	162 ft 6 in (49.53 m)	
3rd place, bronze medalist(s)	Mark Pharaoh	England	156 ft 11 1/2 in (47.84 m)	
4	Stanley Raike	Canada	150 ft 0 in (45.72 m)	
5	Hywel Williams	Wales	148 ft 3 in (45.19 m)	
6	Kenneth Swalwell	Canada	147 ft 1 1/2 in (44.84 m)	
7	Svein Sigfusson	Canada	143 ft 1 1/2 in (43.62 m)	
8	Mesulame Rakuro	Fiji	140 ft 1 1/2 in (42.71 m)	
9	John Savidge	England	137 ft 4 in (41.86 m)	
10	Parduman Singh Brar	India	135 ft 8 1/2 in (41.36 m)	
	Jack Lally	Northern Ireland	DNS	
	Ewan Douglas	Scotland	DNS	
	Jakobus Dreyer	South Africa	DNS	
