= Hwang In-dong =

South Korean weightlifter

Personal information
- Nationality: South Korean
- Born: 2 March 1969 (age 56)

Sport
- Sport: Weightlifting

Hwang In-dong (born 2 March 1969) is a South Korean former weightlifter. He competed in the men's flyweight event at the 1988 Summer Olympics.
