= Chiang Ming-hsiung =

Taiwanese weightlifter

Personal information
- Native name: 蔣明雄
- Nationality: Taiwanese
- Born: 15 January 1967 (age 58)

Sport
- Sport: Weightlifting

Chiang Ming-hsiung (traditional Chinese: 蔣明雄; simplified Chinese: 蒋明雄; born 15 January 1967) is a Taiwanese weightlifter. He competed in the men's flyweight event at the 1988 Summer Olympics.

== Biography ==
Chiang Ming-hsiung was born on 15 January 1967 in the Yanpu township of Pingtung County in Taiwan. He initially competed in track and field, finishing a 100-metre (330 ft) run in 11.6 seconds. Chiang changed to weightlifting in his third year of junior high. He attended National Nei-Pu Senior Agricultural-Industrial Vocational High School. After two years of high school, he was chosen to train for the Olympic Games and moved to a training facility in Zuoying District. Chiang was trained by the coach Li Wen-xiong (Chinese: 李文雄) and national team members Qiu Yu-yuan (Chinese: 邱毓源) and Qiu Yu-chuan (Chinese: 邱毓川). He graduated from the National Taiwan Sport University in 1991. After graduation, he began doing his military service in Pingtung City.

Chiang competed in the 52-kilogram (115 lb) weightlifting division. He competed at the 1988 Summer Olympics, becoming one of the first athletes alongside Tsai Wen-yee to represent Taiwan at the Olympics after the country began participating in the Olympics again. At the 1988 Olympics, he lifted 130 kilograms (290 lb), which set a national record. He has set several national records including in the clean and jerk category. At a district competition in 1988, he represented Pingtung County and lifted 127.5 kilograms (281 lb), which secured first place. He attempted to compete in the 52 kg-category in the Asian Weightlifting Championships in Fuzhou in 1992. Around 15 days before the competition, Chiang was 60 kilograms (130 lb). He tried weight cutting to make the 52 kg-category but was unsuccessful. He collapsed during a training session and withdrew from the competition.

Chiang became an assistant weightlifting coach at National Taiwan Sport University (NTSU). On 13 April 1996 in Guishan, he married Lu Su'e (Chinese: 盧素娥), whom he had met in college. Chiang coached the NTSU team that competed in 2002 at the Taipei City Zhongzheng Cup weightlifting competition (Chinese: 台北市中正杯舉重賽). In the men's division, the NTSU team received the men's group champion title after winning four gold meals in seven categories. He was a coach for the Taiwan's men's team at the World Youth Weightlifting Championships (Chinese: 世青舉重錦標賽) held in South Africa in 1997. Chiang was one of the coaches of Wu Zong-ling (Chinese: 吳宗嶺) when Wu broke Liao Hsing-chou's national record in the 69 kg (152 lb) category in 2006.
