= Hywel Williams (athlete) =

Welsh athlete

Personal information
- Nationality: British (Welsh)
- Born: 1930 (age 95–96)

Sport
- Sport: Athletics
- Events: Decathlon, Shot, Pole vault, discus
- Club: Roath Harriers

Hywel L. Williams (born 1930) is a former Welsh athlete who specialised in the decathlon, shot put and discus throw and appeared at two Commonwealth Games. He was the winner of 13 Welsh national titles.

== Biography ==
Williams was a member of Roath Harriers AC and was competent over the disciplines that made up the decathlon. He won both the discus and pole vault events at the Maindy Stadium, leading up to the 1954 British Empire and Commonwealth Games in Vancouver, Canada.

After initially being selected for the Welsh athletics team for the 1954 British Empire and Commonwealth Games, he was replaced after failing to obtain passage home from Kenya where he was stationed.

However, his widowed mother Olwen Williams, paid for a £269 air fare from Kenya to enable his participation. His father had been killed in a colliery accident. He duly represented Wales in the shot put and the discus throw. He achieved a fifth place finish in the latter. After the Games he returned to Kenya and won five events at the Caledonian Games.

Four years later he was again part of the 1958 Welsh Commonwealth Games team at the 1958 British Empire and Commonwealth Games in Cardiff, Wales.

He continued to compete and was three times Welsh national champion over the discus in 1963, 1964 and 1965.

After retiring from competition he was a senior sports instructor at RAF St Athan and coached athletes such as Clive Longe.
