= Mark Thomas (weightlifter) =

British weightlifter

Personal information
- Nationality: English
- Born: 17 April 1963 (age 63) Croydon, London

Sport
- Club: Gifford
Medal record
weightlifting
Representing England
Commonwealth Games
Gold medal – first place	(x3) 1990 Auckland	110kg heavyweight

Mark Thomas (born 1963), is a former weightlifter who competed for Great Britain and England.

== Weightlifting career ==
Thomas represented Great Britain in the 1988 Summer Olympics.

He represented England and won three gold medals in the 110 kg sub-heavyweight division, at the 1990 Commonwealth Games in Auckland, New Zealand. The three medals were won during an unusual period when three medals were awarded in one category (clean and jerk, snatch, and combined) which invariably led to the same athlete winning all three of the same colour medal.
