= Athletics at the 1954 British Empire and Commonwealth Games – Men's shot put =

Sports shooting at the Empire Stadium

Men's shot put at the Commonwealth Games
- Venue: Empire Stadium
- Dates: 6 August

The men's shot put event at the 1954 British Empire and Commonwealth Games was held on 6 August at the Empire Stadium in Vancouver, Canada.

== Results ==
Rank	Name	Nationality	Result	Notes
1st place, gold medalist(s)	John Savidge	England	55 ft 0 1/4 in (16.77 m)	GR
2nd place, silver medalist(s)	John Pavelich	Canada	49 ft 0 3/4 in (14.95 m)	
3rd place, bronze medalist(s)	Fanie du Plessis	South Africa	49 ft 0 in (14.94 m)	
4	Stanley Raike	Canada	48 ft 1 3/4 in (14.67 m)	
5	Lionel Whitman	Canada	47 ft 8 1/2 in (14.54 m)	
6	Mark Pharaoh	England	46 ft 10 in (14.27 m)	
7	Parduman Singh Brar	India	45 ft 6 1/2 in (13.88 m)	
8	Geoff Elliott	England	45 ft 1 1/4 in (13.75 m)	
9	Eric Coy	Canada	43 ft 10 3/4 in (13.38 m)	
10	Derek Cox	England	41 ft 4 in (12.60 m)	
11	Hywel Williams	Wales	40 ft 4 1/2 in (12.31 m)	
	Kevin Flanagan	Northern Ireland	DNS	
