= Kumarasan Sudalaimani =

Indian weightlifter

Personal information
- Nationality: Indian

Sport
- Sport: Weightlifting
Medal record
Men's weightlifting
Representing India
Event / 1st / 2nd / 3rd; Commonwealth Games / 0 / 0 / 3
Commonwealth Games
Bronze medal – third place	1990 Auckland	60 kg snatch
Bronze medal – third place	1990 Auckland	60 kg clean & jerk
Bronze medal – third place	1990 Auckland	60 kg overall

Kumarasan Sudalaimani is an Indian weightlifter. He competed in the men's featherweight category at the 1990 Commonwealth Games in Auckland, winning bronze medals in the snatch, clean and jerk and overall competition.

At the 1990 Commonwealth Games, Sudalaimani lifted 110 kg (240 lb) in the snatch, 142.5 kg (314 lb) in the clean and jerk and 252.5 kg (557 lb) overall in the men's 60 kg featherweight category. He placed third behind compatriot Parvesh Chander Sharma and Nauru's Marcus Stephen.
