= Gregory Hayman =

Australian weightlifter (born 1957)

Personal information
- Nationality: Australian
- Born: 21 December 1957 (age 68)

Sport
- Sport: Weightlifting
Medal record
Commonwealth Games
Gold medal – first place	1986 Edinburgh	Men's Flyweight
Silver medal – second place	1990 Auckland	Men's Flyweight - Clean and Jerk
Bronze medal – third place	1990 Auckland	Men's Flyweight - Overall
Bronze medal – third place	1990 Auckland	Men's Flyweight - Snatch

Gregory Loyal Hayman (born 21 December 1957) is an Australian former weightlifter. He competed in the men's flyweight event at the 1988 Summer Olympics.

He competed at the Commonwealth Games in 1986, where he won a gold medal in the men's flyweight event, and in 1990, where he won a silver medal in the Clean and Jerk event and bronze medals in the overall and Snatch events.
