= Andrew Saxton (weightlifter) =

British weightlifter

Personal information
- Nationality: English
- Born: 4 May 1967 (age 59) Wagga Wagga, New South Wales, Australia

Sport
- Club: Oxford Powersports
Medal record
weightlifting
Representing England
Commonwealth Games
Bronze medal – third place	1986 Edinburgh	100kg sub-heavyweight
Gold medal – first place	(x3) 1990 Auckland	100kg sub-heavyweight
Representing Australia
Commonwealth Games
Silver medal – second place	(x3) 1994 Victoria BC	99kg

Andrew Saxton (born 4 May 1967), is a male former weightlifter who competed for Great Britain and England and Australia.

== Weightlifting career ==
Saxton represented Great Britain in the 1988 Summer Olympics.

He represented England and won a bronze medal in the 100 kg sub-heavyweight division, at the 1986 Commonwealth Games in Edinburgh, Scotland. Four years later he represented England and won three gold medals in the 100 kg sub-heavyweight division, at the 1990 Commonwealth Games in Auckland, New Zealand. The three medals were won during an unusual period when three medals were awarded in one category (clean and jerk, snatch and combined) which invariably led to the same athlete winning all three of the same colour medal.
