= Duncan Dawkins =

English weightlifter

Personal information
- Nationality: English
Medal record
Weightlifting
Representing England
Commonwealth Games
Silver medal – second place	1986 Edinburgh	100kg sub-heavyweight
Gold medal – first place	(x3) 1990 Auckland	90kg middle-heavyweight

Duncan Dawkins is a male former weightlifter who competed for England.

== Weightlifting career ==
Dawkins represented England and won a silver medal in the 100 kg sub-heavyweight division, at the 1986 Commonwealth Games in Edinburgh, Scotland. Four years later he represented England and won three gold medals in the 90 kg middle-heavyweight division, at the 1990 Commonwealth Games in Auckland, New Zealand. The three medals were won during an unusual period when three medals were awarded in one category (clean and jerk, snatch and combined) which invariably led to the same athlete winning all three of the same colour medal.
