= Peter May (weightlifter) =

British weightlifter (born 1966)

Personal information
- Full name: Peter May
- Born: 18 June 1966 (age 60) Enfield, Greater London, United Kingdom
- Height: 180 cm (5 ft 11 in)
- Weight: 84.78 kg (186.9 lb)

Sport
- Country: Great Britain
- Sport: Weightlifting
- Weight class: 85 kg
- Club: Old Wheatshead
- Team: National team
Medal record
weightlifting
Representing England
Commonwealth Games
Bronze medal – third place	1986 Edinburgh	82.5kg
Silver medal – second place	(x3) 1990 Auckland	100kg
Silver medal – second place	(x3) 1994 Victoria	91kg

Peter May (born 18 June 1966 in Enfield) is a British male weightlifter.

== Weightlifting career ==
May competed in the 85 kg category representing England and Great Britain at international competitions. He participated at the 1988 Summer Olympics in the 100 kg event and at the 1992 Summer Olympics in the 90 kg event. He competed at world championships, most recently at the 2003 World Weightlifting Championships.

He represented England and won a bronze medal in the 82.5 kg light-heavyweight, at the 1986 Commonwealth Games in Edinburgh, Scotland. He then won three silver medals representing England, at the 1990 Commonwealth Games in Auckland, New Zealand during an unusual period when three medals were awarded in one category (clean and jerk, snatch and combined) which invariably led to the same athlete winning all three of the same colour medal. He won another three silver medal at the 1994 Commonwealth Games.

== Major results ==
Year	Venue	Weight	Snatch (kg)				Clean & Jerk (kg)				Total	Rank
Year	Venue	Weight	1	2	3	Rank	1	2	3	Rank	Total	Rank
Summer Olympics
1992	Barcelona, Spain	90 kg				—N/a				—N/a		7
1988	Seoul, South Korea	100 kg				—N/a				—N/a		13
World Championships
2003	Vancouver, Canada	85 kg	150	~~155~~	~~155~~	28	175	180	185	26	335	27
2001	Antalya, Turkey	94 kg	155	160	~~162.5~~	14	185	~~190~~	190	15	350	13
1998	Lahti, Finland	94 kg	~~150~~	~~150~~	150	19	~~185~~	~~185~~	~~187.5~~	---	0	---
