= Gopal Maruthachelam =

Indian weightlifter

Personal information
- Nationality: Indian

Sport
- Sport: Weightlifting
Medal record
Men's weightlifting
Representing India
Event / 1st / 2nd / 3rd; Commonwealth Games / 0 / 1 / 1
Commonwealth Games
Silver medal – second place	1990 Auckland	56 kg clean & jerk
Bronze medal – third place	1990 Auckland	56 kg overall

Gopal Maruthachelam is an Indian weightlifter. He competed in the men's bantamweight category at the 1990 Commonwealth Games in Auckland, winning a silver medal in the clean and jerk and a bronze medal in the overall competition. At the 1990 Commonwealth Games, he lifted 102.5 kg (226 lb) in the snatch to finish fourth. He lifted 125 kg (276 lb) in the clean and jerk to finish second behind compatriot Rangaswamy Punnuswamy and 227.5 kg (502 lb) overall to finish third.
