= Velu Govindraj =

Indian weightlifter

Personal information
- Nationality: Indian

Sport
- Sport: Weightlifting
Medal record
Men's weightlifting
Representing India
Event / 1st / 2nd / 3rd; Commonwealth Games / 0 / 2 / 1
Commonwealth Games
Silver medal – second place	1990 Auckland	52 kg snatch
Silver medal – second place	1990 Auckland	52 kg overall
Bronze medal – third place	1990 Auckland	52 kg clean & jerk

Velu Govindraj is an Indian weightlifter. He competed in the men's flyweight category at the 1990 Commonwealth Games in Auckland, winning silver medals in the snatch and overall competition and a bronze medal in the clean and jerk.

At the 1990 Commonwealth Games, Govindraj lifted 95 kg (209 lb) in the snatch, 117.5 kg (259 lb) in the clean and jerk and 212.5 kg (468 lb) overall in the men's 52 kg flyweight category. He finished second in the snatch and overall competition behind compatriot Chandersekaran Raghavan, who won the gold medal.
