= Soma Dutta =

Indian sport shooter (born 1967)

Personal information
- Nationality: Indian
- Born: 25 December 1967 (age 57); India

Sport
- Sport: Sports shooting

Soma Dutta (born 25 December 1967) is an Indian sport shooter. She competed in rifle shooting events at the 1984 Summer Olympics, the 1988 Summer Olympics and the 1992 Summer Olympics. Soma is the daughter of Murari Mohan Dutta and Bella Dutta of the wellknown GD Pharmaceuticals who make Boroline, the world famous cream. Her brother Debashish Dutta now runs GD Pharmaceuticals

== Olympic results ==
Event	1984	1988	1992
10 metre air rifle (women)	22nd	T-30th	T-35th
50 metre rifle three positions (women)	T-17th	T-23rd	T-22nd
