= Kevin Blake =

New Zealand weightlifter (born 1960)

Personal information
- Full name: Kevin William Blake
- Born: 30 November 1960 (age 65) Auckland, New Zealand

Sport
- Country: New Zealand
- Sport: Weightlifting

Kevin William Blake (born 30 November 1960) is a New Zealand former weightlifter. He competed at the 1984 Summer Olympics and the 1988 Summer Olympics.
