= Jason Roberts (weightlifter) =

Australian weightlifter

Jason Bryce Roberts
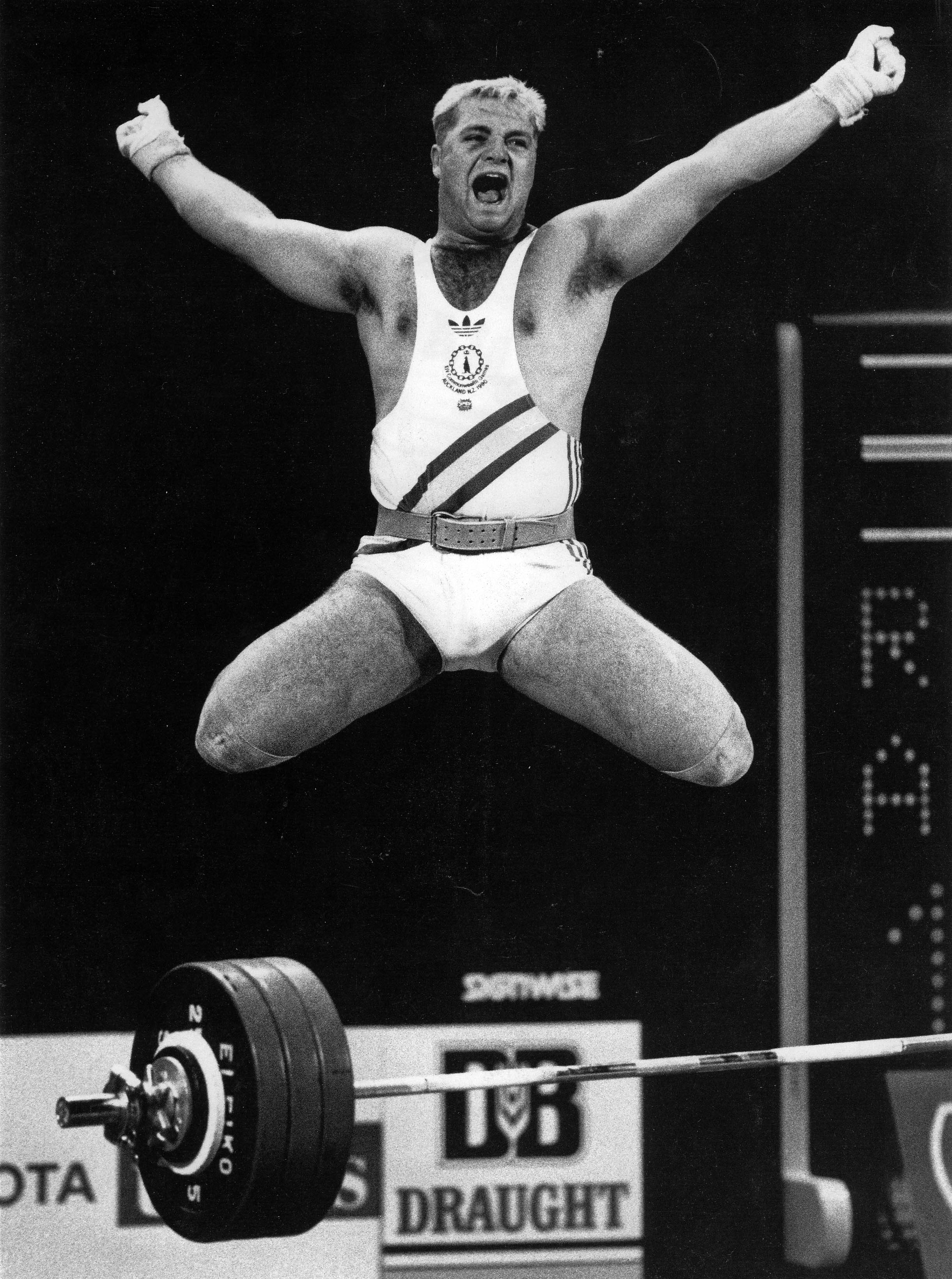
- Jason Roberts; Clean and Jerk - 192.5 kg (Silver Medal); 1990 Commonwealth games

Personal information
- Nationality: Australian

Sport
- Country: Australia
- Sport: Weightlifting
Medal record
Weightlifting
Representing Australia
Commonwealth Games
Silver medal – second place	1990 Auckland	+152.5 kg Snatch
Silver medal – second place	1990 Auckland	+192.5 kg Clean and Jerk
Silver medal – second place	1990 Auckland	+345 kg Overall

Jason Bryce Roberts is an Australian weightlifter. He competed for Australia at 1990 Commonwealth Games in the Heavyweight division, winning three Silver Medals in the snatch, clean and jerk and overall events.

His anti-drugs stand was noted in the 1990 Australian Senate inquiry into drugs in sport. In 1992, Jason Roberts was vocally against the importation of Rumanian and Bulgarian weightlifters, specifically for the Barcelona Olympics, on the grounds that they had no interest in migrating to Australia. Subsequently, following the Barcelona Games, most of them left Australia. Michael Noonan, the executive director of Australian Weightlifting Federation between 1990 and 1993, confirmed that AWF "bought" and supported the Bulgarians and Romanian weightlifters to come to Australia in the 1990s.
