= Keith Boxell =

British weightlifter (born 1968)

Personal information
- Born: 6 May 1968 (age 58) Clapham, Greater London, England

Sport
- Club: Grove Gym
Medal record
weightlifting
Representing England
Commonwealth Games
Gold medal – first place	1986 Edinburgh	90kg middle-heavyweight
Silver medal – second place	(x3) 1990 Auckland	90kg middle-heavyweight

Keith Boxell (born 1968) is a former weightlifter who competed for Great Britain and England.

== Weightlifting career ==
Boxell represented Great Britain in the 1984 Summer Olympics, 1988 Summer Olympics and 1992 Summer Olympics.

He represented England and won a gold medal in the 90 kg middle-heavyweight division, at the 1986 Commonwealth Games in Edinburgh, Scotland. Four years later he represented England and won three silver medals in the 90 kg middle-heavyweight division, at the 1990 Commonwealth Games in Auckland, New Zealand. The three medals were won during an unusual period when three medals were awarded in one category (clean and jerk, snatch and combined) which invariably led to the same athlete winning all three of the same colour medal.
