= Michael Tererui =

Cook Islands weightlifter

Personal information
- Born: 7 April 1963 (age 61)
- Height: 1.68 m (5 ft 6 in)
- Weight: 90 kg (200 lb)

Sport
- Country: Cook Islands
- Sport: Weightlifting

Michael Tererui (born 7 April 1963) is a former weightlifter who competed for the Cook Islands.

Tererui competed at the 1988 Summer Olympics in Seoul, he entered the heavyweight division in the weightlifting, where he finished 16th out of 21 starters. He later became an official weightlifting coach.
