= Ken Swalwell =

Canadian football player

Profile
- Positions: Halfback, End

Personal information
- Born: c. 1930 (age 95–96)
- Listed height: 6 ft 3 in (1.91 m)
- Listed weight: 190 lb (86 kg)

Career information
- College: Western Washington

Career history
- 1955–1956: BC Lions

Kenneth Swalwell (born c. 1930) was a Canadian football player who played for the BC Lions, as well as a discus thrower. He played college football at Western Washington University.
