= Allister Nalder =

New Zealand weightlifter (born 1957)

Personal information
- Full name: Allister John Nalder
- Born: 4 May 1957 (age 68) Tākaka, New Zealand
- Height: 1.72 m (5 ft 8 in)
- Weight: 83 kg (183 lb)

Sport
- Country: New Zealand
- Sport: Weightlifting

Allister John Nalder (born 4 May 1957) is a New Zealand weightlifter who competed in the men's light heavyweight event, at the 1984 Summer Olympics.

== Biography ==
Nalder was born in Tākaka on 4 May 1957. He became a member of the Nelson Weightlifting Club, which during the 1980s and early 1990s was one of the strongholds of weightlifting in New Zealand.

Since 1983, Nalder has sold residential real estate. He founded Summit Real Estate in Nelson and is the company's sole director.

In 1990, Nalder was awarded the New Zealand 1990 Commemoration Medal.
