= Karnadhar Mondal =

Indian weightlifter

Personal information
- Nationality: Indian

Sport
- Sport: Weightlifting
Medal record
Men's weightlifting
Representing India
Event / 1st / 2nd / 3rd; Commonwealth Games / 1 / 2 / 0
Commonwealth Games
Gold medal – first place	1990 Auckland	75 kg snatch
Silver medal – second place	1990 Auckland	75 kg clean & jerk
Silver medal – second place	1990 Auckland	75 kg overall

Karnadhar Mondal is an Indian weightlifter. He competed in the men's middleweight category at the 1990 Commonwealth Games in Auckland, winning a gold medal in the snatch and silver medals in the clean and jerk and overall competition. At the 1990 Commonwealth Games, Mondal lifted 135 kg (298 lb) in the snatch to set a new Commonwealth Games record in the men's 75 kg category. He lifted 170 kg (370 lb) in the clean and jerk and 305 kg (672 lb) overall.
