= Paramjit Sharma =

Indian weightlifter (born 1964)

Personal information
- Nationality: Indian
- Born: 1957 or 1958 (age 68–69)

Sport
- Sport: Weightlifting
Medal record
Men's weightlifting
Representing India
Event / 1st / 2nd / 3rd; Commonwealth Games / 3 / 0 / 0
Commonwealth Games
Gold medal – first place	1990 Auckland	Lightweight total
Gold medal – first place	1990 Auckland	Lightweight snatch
Gold medal – first place	1990 Auckland	Lightweight clean & jerk

Paramjit Sharma is an Indian weightlifter. He won three gold medals in the 1990 Commonwealth Games in the lightweight category. He later became a weightlifting coach, and was the coach of the multiple Commonwealth Games medalist Harjinder Kaur. He was awarded the Arjuna Award, India's second highest sporting honour, by the Government of India in 1997.
