= Guy Greavette =

Canadian weightlifter (born 1960)

Personal information
- Nationality: Canadian
- Born: 27 April 1960 (age 66) New Westminster, British Columbia, Canada

Sport
- Sport: Weightlifting
- Club: Vikings Weightlifting Club

Guy Greavette (born 27 April 1960) is a Canadian weightlifter and coach. He competed in the men's middle heavyweight event at the 1988 Summer Olympics.
