= Charles Garzarella =

Australian weightlifter (born 1964)

Personal information
- Nationality: Australian
- Born: 10 September 1964 (age 61)

Sport
- Sport: Weightlifting
Medal record
Men's Weightlifting
Commonwealth Games
Bronze medal – third place	1986 Edinburgh	Super heavyweight

Charles Francis Garzarella (born 10 September 1964) is an Australian former weightlifter. He competed in the men's super heavyweight event at the 1988 Summer Olympics.
