= Ron Laycock =

Australian weightlifter (born 1965)

Personal information
- Nationality: Australian
- Born: 18 October 1965 (age 60)

Sport
- Sport: Weightlifting
Medal record
Men's Weightlifting
Commonwealth Games
Silver medal – second place	1986 Edinburgh	Lightweight
Gold medal – first place	1990 Auckland	Middleweight – Clean and Jerk
Gold medal – first place	1990 Auckland	Middleweight – Overall
Bronze medal – third place	1990 Auckland	Middleweight -Snatch

Ron Laycock (born 18 October 1965) is an Australian former weightlifter. He competed at the 1988 Summer Olympics and the 1992 Summer Olympics.
