= Dave Morgan (weightlifter) =

Welsh weightlifter

David Morgan MBE
Personal information
- Nationality: Wales
- Born: 30 September 1964 (age 61)

Sport
- Sport: Weightlifting

David Morgan MBE (born 30 September 1964) is a Welsh weightlifter.

Morgan won the British under-16 championship in 1979. He became the youngest ever Commonwealth Games weightlifting champion in 1982 at Brisbane, at 17 years of age. Competing in the lightweight class (67.5 kg), he achieved 132.5 kg in the snatch and 162.5 kg in the clean and jerk to defeat former champion Basil (Bill) Stellios of Australia. Morgan is the only competitor to win medals in six different Commonwealth Games, with victories in 1982, 1986, 1990, 1994, 1998, and 2002. He won two gold and one silver medals in 2002 at Manchester (with 145 kg in the snatch and 160 in the clean and jerk), bringing his career medal total to twelve (nine gold, three silver).

Morgan recorded his best attempt in the snatch at the 1984 Junior World Championships, with a lift of 150 kg which gave him the gold in the snatch in the 75 kg class. He then went on to finish second overall after a clean and jerk of 180k. This was the first time in 27 years that a British weightlifter has won a gold medal in a world championship.

Morgan placed fourth in the 1984 Summer Olympics. At the 1988 Summer Olympics in Seoul, Morgan competed in the 82.5 kg class and finished fourth again with a total of 365 kg. David Morgan is also the only person in history to have won overall gold in 5 commonwealth games.

He worked for 10 years as a commentator for Eurosport, appeared on the BBC show "They Think It's All Over" with Jonathan Ross and David Gower. For charity, he climbed Mount Kilimanjaro and took part in Comic Relief in 2004. Morgan was inducted into the Welsh Sports Hall Of Fame in 2013. In his private life, he married his wife Rosalind in 2010.

In 2007 Morgan published his book "Be Your Best: The Smart Way to Improve Your Fitness, Shape and Mind Paperback" with Virgin.

He was appointed Member of the Order of the British Empire (MBE) in the 2020 New Year Honours for services to weightlifting.

He is still working as a private trainer in Cambridge and advocates weight training for people of all ages to improve their health and slow down aging.
