= Ponnuswamy Rangaswamy =

Indian weightlifter (born 1964)

Personal information
- Nationality: Indian
- Born: 13 August 1964 (age 61)

Sport
- Sport: Weightlifting
Medal record
Men's weightlifting
Representing India
Event / 1st / 2nd / 3rd; Commonwealth Games / 3 / 0 / 0
Commonwealth Games
Gold medal – first place	1990 Auckland	Bantamweight total
Gold medal – first place	1990 Auckland	Bantamweight snatch
Gold medal – first place	1990 Auckland	Bantamweight clean & jerk

Ponnuswamy Rangaswamy (born 13 August 1964) is an Indian weightlifter. He won three gold medals in the 1990 Commonwealth Games in the bantamweight category.

He represented India in the men's bantamweight event at the 1992 Summer Olympics. In the Olympic competition at Barcelona, he lifted 102.5 kg (226 lb) in snatch and 127.5 kg (281 lb) in clean and jerk for a total of 230 kg (510 lb).
