= Muyiwa Odusanya =

Nigerian weightlifter (born 1967)

Personal information
- Nationality: Nigerian
- Born: 25 September 1967 (age 58)

Sport
- Sport: Weightlifting

Muyiwa Odusanya (born 25 September 1967) is a Nigerian weightlifter. He competed in the men's light heavyweight event at the 1988 Summer Olympics.
