= Raghavan Chanderasekaran =

Indian weightlifter (born 1970)

Personal information
- Nationality: Indian
- Born: 8 June 1970 (age 56) Tiruvallur, Tamil Nadu, India

Sport
- Sport: Weightlifting
- Weight class: Flyweight / Bantamweight
Medal record
Men's weightlifting
Representing India
Event	1st	2nd	3rd
Commonwealth Games	3	3	0
South Asian Games	1	0	0
Commonwealth Games
Gold medal – first place	1990 Auckland	Flyweight total
Gold medal – first place	1990 Auckland	Flyweight snatch
Gold medal – first place	1990 Auckland	Flyweight clean & jerk
Silver medal – second place	1994 Victoria	Bantamweight total
Silver medal – second place	1994 Victoria	Bantamweight snatch
Silver medal – second place	1994 Victoria	Bantamweight clean & jerk
South Asian Games
Gold medal – first place	1987 Dhaka	Flyweight

Raghavan Chanderasekaran (born 8 June 1970) is an Indian weightlifter. He represented India at the 1988 Summer Olympics and the 1996 Summer Olympics. He won three gold medals in the 1990 Commonwealth Games, and three silver medals in the 1994 Commonwealth Games, to become the most decorated Indian male weightlifter at the Commonwealth Games. He has also won a gold medal at the 1987 South Asian Games at Dhaka.

He was awarded the Arjuna Award, India's second highest sporting honour, by the Government of India in 1990.
