= Parvesh Chander Sharma =

Indian weightlifter

- Parvesh Chander Sharma at Senior National Championship

Personal information
- Full name: Parvesh Chander Sharma
- Nationality: Indian
- Born: Parvesh Chander Sharma; 25 September 1956 (age 70) Punjab, India

Sport
- Country: India
- Sport: Weightlifting
- Event: Featherweight
Medal record
Representing India
Men's weightlifting
Commonwealth Games
Gold medal – first place	1990 Auckland	Clean and Jerk
Gold medal – first place	1990 Auckland	Overall
Silver medal – second place	1990 Auckland	Snatch

Parvesh Chander Sharma (born September 25, 1956) is an Indian weightlifter from Punjab. At the 1990 Commonwealth Games, he won two gold medals in the Men's Featherweight – Clean and Jerk, Men's Featherweight – Overall and one silver medal in Men's Featherweight-Snatch.

Parvesh Chander Sharma at Senior National Championship Thanjavur performed Clean and Jerk of 153 kg

== Records/Medals in Weightlifting ==
=== International Level ===
Year	Body Weight	Weightlifting Event	Place	Position
1982	52 kg	Asian Games	New Delhi, India	Fourth
1983	52 kg	Asian Championship	Damascus, Syria	Fourth
1985	56 kg	Commonwealth Weightlifting Championship	Western Samoa	First
1988	60 kg	Commonwealth Weightlifting Championship	Malta	First
1989	60 kg	INDO-USSR Training cum Cultural Tour	Russia	First
1990	60 kg	Commonwealth Games	Auckland, New Zealand	First
1990	60 kg	INDO-USSR Training cum Cultural Tour	Russia	First
1990	60 kg	INDO-USSR Training cum Cultural Tour	Bangalore, India	First
1990	60 kg	India vs. Bulgaria Training cum Cultural Tour	Bangalore, India	First
1993	60 kg	Youth World Weightlifting Championship	Iran	First

=== National Level ===
Year	Body Weight	Weightlifting Event	Place	Position
1981	52 kg	Junior National Championship	Kolkata, India	First
1982	52 kg	Senior National Championship	New Delhi, India	First
1985	60 kg	Senior National Championship	Kolkata, India	First
1986	60 kg	Senior National Championship	Jaipur, India	Second
1988	60 kg	Senior National Championship (Created New Record in C&J 145.5 kg)	Jamnagar, India	First
1989	60 kg	Senior National Championship (Created New Record in C&J 146 kg)	Jamshedpur, India	Second
1990	60 kg	Senior National Championship (Created New Record in C&J 153 kg)	Thanjavur, India	Second
1991	60 kg	Senior National Championship	Ambala, India	First
1992	60 kg	Senior National Championship	Bangalore, India	Second
1993	60 kg	Senior National Championship	(India) Eluru	Second
