= Weightlifting at the 1970 British Commonwealth Games =

- Venue: Leith Town Hall
- Location: Edinburgh, Scotland
- Dates: 16 to 25 July 1970

Weightlifting at the 1970 British Commonwealth Games was the sixth appearance of Weightlifting at the Commonwealth Games.

The events took place at the Leith Town Hall in Edinburgh, Scotland, and featured contests in nine weight classes.

England topped the weightlifting medal table with four gold medals and one silver medal.

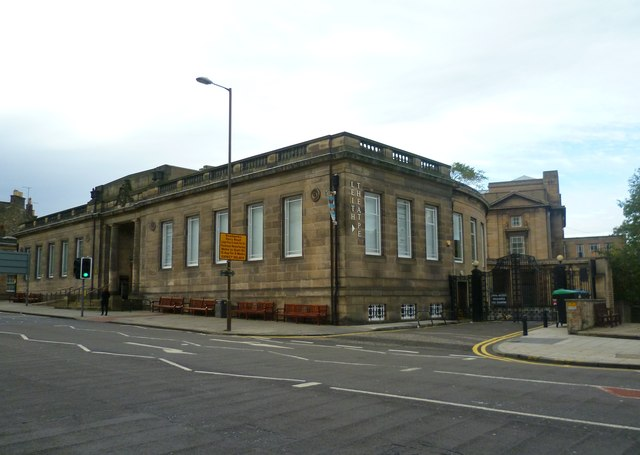
Leith Town Hall in 2011

== Medal table ==
* Host nation (Scotland)

Medals won by nation with totals, ranked by number of golds—sortable
| Rank | Nation | Gold | Silver | Bronze | Total |
|---|---|---|---|---|---|
| 1 | England | 4 | 1 | 0 | 5 |
| 2 | Australia | 4 | 0 | 0 | 4 |
| 3 | Canada | 1 | 1 | 2 | 4 |
| 4 | New Zealand | 0 | 2 | 1 | 3 |
| 4 | Wales | 0 | 2 | 1 | 3 |
| 6 | Singapore | 0 | 1 | 1 | 2 |
| 7 | Barbados | 0 | 1 | 0 | 1 |
| 7 | Pakistan | 0 | 1 | 0 | 1 |
| 9 | Scotland* | 0 | 0 | 2 | 2 |
| 10 | India | 0 | 0 | 1 | 1 |
| 10 | Saint Vincent | 0 | 0 | 1 | 1 |
| Totals (11 entries) | | 9 | 9 | 9 | 27 |

== Medal winners ==
| Event | Gold | Silver | Bronze |
|---|---|---|---|
| Flyweight 52 kg | George Vassiliadis; Australia | Abdul Ghafoor; Pakistan | John McNiven; Scotland |
| Bantamweight 56 kg | Precious McKenzie; England | Tony Phillips; Barbados | Tung Chye Hong; Singapore |
| Featherweight 60 kg | Gerald Perrin; England | Chua Phung Kim; Singapore | Alexander Navis; India |
| Lightweight 67.5 kg | George Newton; England | Ieuan Owen; Wales | Bruce Cameron; New Zealand |
| Middleweight 75 kg | Russell Perry; Australia | Tony Ebert; New Zealand | Pierre St. Jean; Canada |
| Light Heavyweight 82.5 kg | Nick Ciancio; Australia | John Bolton; New Zealand | Peter Arthur; Wales |
| Middle Heavyweight 90 kg | Louis Martin; England | Robert Santavy; Canada | George Manners; Saint Vincent |
| Heavyweight 110 kg | Russ Prior; Canada | Dave Hancock; England | Price Morris; Canada |
| Super Heavyweight +110 kg | Ray Rigby; Australia | Terry Perdue; Wales | Grant Anderson; Scotland |

== Results ==
=== Flyweight 52kg ===
| Pos | Athlete | Weight |
|---|---|---|
| 1 | George Vassiliadis (AUS) | 290 kg |
| 2 | Abdul Ghafoor (PAK) | 287.5 kg |
| 3 | John McNiven (SCO) | 265 kg |
| 4 | Hingboo Sua (MAS) | 255 kg |
| 5 | Lindsay Loiseau (MRI) | 240 kg |
| 6 | Charlie Revolta (SCO) | 235 kg |
| 7 | Cecil Pertab (GUY) | 207.5 kg |
| - | Anil Mondal (IND) | ns |
| - | S. J. Gabriel (IND) | ns |
| - | B. Jugdutt (MRI) | ns |

=== Bantamweight 56kg ===
| Pos | Athlete | Weight |
|---|---|---|
| 1 | Precious McKenzie (ENG) | 335 kg |
| 2 | Anthony Phillips (BAR) | 317.5 kg |
| 3 | Tung Chye Hong (SIN) | 302.5 kg |
| 4 | Chun Hon Chan (CAN) | 302.5 kg |
| 5 | Shannug Velliswamy (IND) | 292.5 kg |
| 6 | Meurin Williams (WAL) | 285 kg |

=== Featherweight 60kg ===
| Pos | Athlete | Weight |
|---|---|---|
| 1 | Gerald Perrin (ENG) | 342.5 kg |
| 2 | Chua Phung Kim (SIN) | 340 kg |
| 3 | Alexander Navis (IND) | 335 kg |
| 4 | Chung Kum Weng (WAL) | 332.5 kg |
| 5 | Koon-Siong Chua (SIN) | 312.5 kg |

=== Lightweight 67.5kg ===
| Pos | Athlete | Weight |
|---|---|---|
| 1 | George Newton (ENG) | 372.5 kg |
| 2 | Ieuan Owen (WAL) | 355 kg |
| 3 | Bruce Cameron (NZL) | 355 kg |
| 4 | Hugo Gittens (TRI) | 352.5 kg |
| 5 | Arun K. Das (IND) | 347.5 kg |
| 6 | William Maynard (BAR) | 342.5 kg |
| 7 | Paul Ross (NIR) | 327.5 kg |
| - | Joseph Charles Brancatisano (AUS) | ns |
| - | Dennis Mulkerrin (GGY) | ns |
| - | Peter Fiore (ZAM) | ns |

=== Middleweight 75kg ===
| Pos | Athlete | Weight |
|---|---|---|
| 1 | Russell Perry (AUS) | 414.5 kg |
| 2 | Tony Ebert (NZL) | 402.5 kg |
| 3 | Pierre St.-Jean (CAN) | 400 kg |
| 4 | Stanley Bailey (TRI) | 390 kg |
| 5 | Keith Adams (CAN) | 380 kg |
| 6 | Laurie Levine (ENG) | 380 kg |
| 7 | Terry Bennett (WAL) | 372.5 kg |
| 8 | Horace Johnson (WAL) | 367.5 kg |
| 9 | E. Parkes (SCO) | 365 kg |
| 10 | Tan Howe Liang (SIN) | 345 kg |
| 11 | George Byng (SCO) | 320 kg |

=== Light Heavyweight 82.5kg ===
| Pos | Athlete | Weight |
|---|---|---|
| 1 | Nick Ciancio (AUS) | 447.5 kg |
| 2 | John Bolton (NZL) | 445 kg |
| 3 | Peter Arthur (WAL) | 427.5 kg |
| 4 | Rudolph James (GUY) | 425 kg |
| 5 | Mike Pearman (ENG) | 425 kg |
| 6 | Brian Marsden (CAN) | 420 kg |
| 7 | Earl Jack (CAN) | 415 kg |
| 8 | Hal Springer (BAR) | 382.5 kg |
| 9 | Robert Wrench (WAL) | 375 kg |
| 10 | Phil Caira (SCO) | 362.5 kg |
| 11 | N. McLeod (SCO) | 335 kg |
| 12 | H. Rose (ZAM) | 305 kg |
| - | C. Thomas (ATG) | ns |
| - | John Sherley (NZL) | ns |
| - | David Harry (TRI) | ns |

=== Middle Heavyweight 90kg ===
| Pos | Athlete | Weight |
|---|---|---|
| 1 | Louis Martin (ENG) | 457.5 kg |
| 2 | Robert Santavy (CAN) | 425 kg |
| 3 | George Manners (VIN) | 410 kg |
| 4 | Peter Nitsch (WAL) | 402.5 kg |
| 5 | Billy Lyttle (NIR) | 395 kg |
| 6 | Alex McAfee (NIR) | 380 kg |
| 7 | Alan A. Tang Yan (MRI) | 362.5 kg |
| 8 | Derek Gillies (SCO) | 357.5 kg |
| 9 | Paul Bjarnason (CAN) | ns |

=== Heavyweight 110kg ===
| Pos | Athlete | Weight |
|---|---|---|
| 1 | Russ Prior (CAN) | 490 kg |
| 2 | Dave Hancock (ENG) | 470 kg |
| 3 | Price Morris (CAN) | 470 kg |
| 4 | Chim Seong Leong (AUS) | 447.5 kg |
| 5 | John Hynd (SCO) | 432.5 kg |
| 6 | Charles Madondo (ZAM) | 310 kg |
| 7 | Dave Pattison (NIR) | ns |

=== Super Heavyweight +110kg ===
| Pos | Athlete | Weight |
|---|---|---|
| 1 | Ray Rigby (AUS) | 500 kg |
| 2 | Terry Perdue (WAL) | 500 kg |
| 3 | Grant Anderson (CAN) | 432.5 kg |
| 4 | Brian Saunders (ENG) | ns |

== See also ==
- List of Commonwealth Games medallists in weightlifting
