= Weightlifting at the 1974 British Commonwealth Games =

- Venue: Christchurch Town Hall
- Location: Christchurch, New Zealand
- Dates: 24 January to 2 February 1974

Weightlifting at the 1974 British Commonwealth Games was the seventh appearance of Weightlifting at the Commonwealth Games.

The events took place at the newly constructed Christchurch Town Hall in Christchurch, New Zealand, from 24 January to 2 February 1974 and featured contests in nine weight classes.

England and Australia topped the weightlifting medal table with identical medal records.

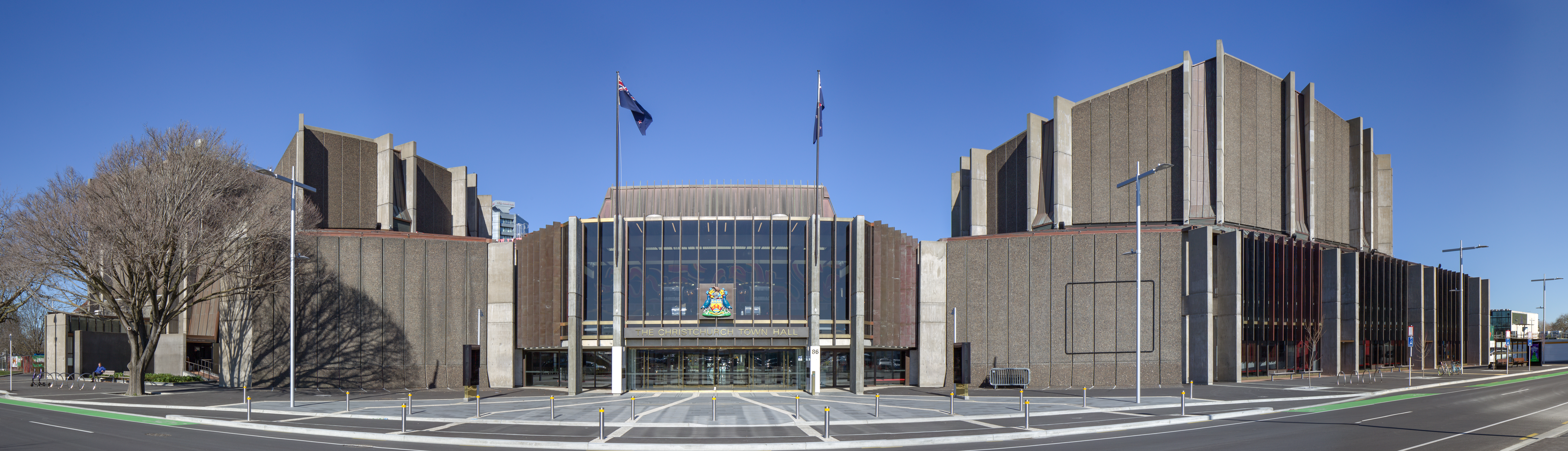
Christchurch Town Hall in 2019

== Medal table ==
* Host nation (New Zealand)

Medals won by nation with totals, ranked by number of golds—sortable
Rank	Nation	Gold	Silver	Bronze	Total
1	Australia	3	1	1	5
1	England	3	1	1	5
3	New Zealand*	2	2	3	7
4	Canada	1	1	0	2
5	Wales	0	1	2	3
6	India	0	1	1	2
7	Samoa	0	1	0	1
7	Trinidad and Tobago	0	1	0	1
9	Scotland	0	0	1	1
Totals (9 entries)		9	9	9	27

== Medal winners ==
Event	Gold	Silver	Bronze
Flyweight 52kg	Precious McKenzie; England	Anil Mondal; India	John McNiven; Scotland
Bantamweight 56kg	Michael Adams; Australia	Yves Carignan; Canada	Shanmug Velliswamy; India
Featherweight 60kg	George Vassiliadis; Australia	Gerald Hay; Australia	Brian Duffy; New Zealand
Lightweight 67.5kg	George Newton; England	Ieuan Owen; Wales	Bruce Cameron; New Zealand
Middleweight 75kg	Tony Ebert; New Zealand	Stanley Bailey; Trinidad and Tobago	Robert Wrench; Wales
Light Heavyweight 82.5kg	Tony Ford; England	Paul Wallwork; Samoa	Mike Pearman; England
Middle Heavyweight 90kg	Nick Ciancio; Australia	Brian Marsden; New Zealand	Steve Wyatt; Australia
Heavyweight 110kg	Russ Prior; Canada	John Bolton; New Zealand	Rory Barrett; New Zealand
Super Heavyweight +110kg	Graham May; New Zealand	Andy Kerr; England	Terry Perdue; Wales

== Results ==
=== Flyweight 52kg ===
Pos	Athlete	Kg
1	Precious McKenzie (ENG)	215
2	Anil Mondal (IND)	200
3	John McNiven (SCO)	192.5
4	Bee Kia Ng (SIN)	190
5	Dulal Chaudhury (IND)	187.5
6	Charlie Revolta (SCO)	180
7	Bee Lung Wai (SAM)	170
8	Lindsay Loiseau (MRI)	145

=== Bantamweight 56kg ===
Pos	Athlete	Kg
1	Michael Adams (AUS)	222.5
2	Yves Carignan (CAN)	212.5
3	Shanmug Velliswamy (IND)	212.5
4	Hingboo Sua (MAS)	172.5
5	Ivan Eugene Katz (AUS)	No total

=== Featherweight 60kg ===
Pos	Athlete	Kg
1	George Vassiliadis (AUS)	237.5
2	Gerald Hay (AUS)	235
3	Brian Duffy (NZL)	232.5
4	Koon-Siong Chua (SIN)	227.5
5	Douglas Robertson (CAN)	225
6	Chung Kum Weng (WAL)	225
7	Meurin Williams (WAL)	217.5
8	Alan Winterbourne (ENG)	212.5
9	Young Yan Yeung Waiping (MRI)	180

=== Lightweight 67.5kg ===
Pos	Athlete	Kg
1	George Newton (ENG)	260
2	Ieuan Owen (WAL)	255
3	Bruce Cameron (NZL)	252.5
4	William Frew (AUS)	252.5
5	Phillip Sue (NZL)	250
6	Paul Ross (NIR)	247.5
7	Pike Nyirongo (ZAM)	207.5
8	Tino Amato (SAM)	205

=== Middleweight 75kg ===
Pos	Athlete	Kg
1	Tony Ebert (NZL)	275
2	Stanley Bailey (TRI)	275
3	Robert Wrench (WAL)	270
4	Terry Bennett (WAL)	270
5	Michael Foy (ENG)	255
6	Marcel Perron (CAN)	252.5
7	Justice Chiwanga (ZAM)	227.5
8	Sio Petelo (SAM)	227.5
-	John Robert Waterworth (AUS)	No Total

=== Light Heavyweight 82.5kg ===
Pos	Athlete	Kg
1	Tony Ford (ENG)	302.5
2	Paul Wallwork (SAM)	300
3	Mike Pearman (ENG)	292.5
4	Peter Brosnan (NZL)	290
5	Joe Sheppard (NIR)	230

=== Middle Heavyweight 90kg ===
Pos	Athlete	Kg
1	Nick Ciancio (AUS)	330
2	Brian Marsden (NZL)	315
3	Steve Wyatt (AUS)	310
4	John Burns (WAL)	310
5	Thomas Yule (SCO)	290
6	Claude April (CAN)	277.5
7	Peter Nitsch (WAL)	275
8	John Shea (PNG)	265
9	Edward Gabriel (SAM)	260
-	Alex McAfee (NIR)	No Total
-	Kenneth Holland (SCO)	No Total

=== Heavyweight 110kg ===
Pos	Athlete	Weight
1	Russ Prior (CAN)	352.5
2	John Bolton (NZL)	340
3	Rory Barrett (NZL)	320
4	Nigel Martin (AUS)	317.5
5	Claude Hardy (CAN)	310
6	Filimoni Romanu (FIJ)	245
-	Brian Strange (ENG)	No Total
-	Tommy McAfee (NIR)	No Total

=== Super Heavyweight +110kg ===
Gold medal winner Graham May famously fell face first during one of his lifts, with the bar rolling off the stage.

Pos	Athlete	Kg
1	Graham May (NZL)	342.5
2	Andy Kerr (ENG)	337.5
3	Terry Perdue (WAL)	330
4	David Hancock (ENG)	312.5
5	Michael James Brown (WAL)	307.5
-	Jack Hynd (SCO)	No Total
-	Grant Anderson (SCO)	No Total

== See also ==
- List of Commonwealth Games medallists in weightlifting
