= Weightlifting at the 1966 British Empire and Commonwealth Games =

- Location: Ward Theatre, Kingston, Jamaica
- Dates: 4 to 13 August 1966

Weightlifting at the 1966 British Empire and Commonwealth Games was the fifth appearance of Weightlifting at the Commonwealth Games. The events took place at the Ward Theatre in Kingston, Jamaica and featured contests in seven weight classes.

England topped the weightlifting medal table with two gold medals.

== Medal table ==
* Host nation (Jamaica)

Medals won by nation with totals, ranked by number of golds—sortable
Rank	Nation	Gold	Silver	Bronze	Total
1	England	2	3	1	6
2	Australia	1	1	1	3
2	Wales	1	1	1	3
4	Canada	1	0	2	3
5	Trinidad and Tobago	1	0	1	2
6	New Zealand	1	0	0	1
7	Guyana	0	1	0	1
7	India	0	1	0	1
9	Jamaica*	0	0	1	1
Totals (9 entries)		7	7	7	21

== Medal winners ==
Event	Gold	Silver	Bronze
Bantamweight	Precious McKenzie; England	Martin Dias; Guyana	Chun Hon Chan; Canada
Featherweight	Chung Kum Weng; Wales	Mahon Ghosh; India	Allen Salter; Canada
Lightweight	Hugo Gittens; Trinidad and Tobago	George Newton; England	Ieuan Owen; Wales
Middleweight	Pierre St.-Jean; Canada	Horace Johnson; Wales	Russell Perry; Australia
Light Heavyweight	George Vakakis; Australia	Sylvanus Blackman; England	Mike Pearman; England
Middle Heavyweight	Louis Martin; England	George Manners; England	Dudley Lawson; Jamaica
Heavyweight	Don Oliver; New Zealand	Arthur Shannos; Australia	Brandon Bailey; Trinidad and Tobago

== Results ==
=== Bantamweight 56kg ===
Pos	Athlete	Weight
1	Precious McKenzie (ENG)	705 lb
2	Martin Dias (GUY)	677.5 lb
3	Chun Hon Chan (CAN)	672 lb
4	Anthony Phillips (BAR)	666.5 lb
5	Gerald Hay (AUS)	655.5 lb
6	Marcel Gosselin (CAN)	616.75 lb
7	John McNiven (SCO)	606 lb
8	Sammy Dalzell (NIR)	600.25 lb
9	Clifford Chin (JAM)	545.25 lb
-	(British Honduras) William A. Samuels (BIZ)	ns
-	Chua Phung Kim (SIN)	ns

=== Featherweight 60kg ===
Pos	Athlete	Weight
1	Chung Kum Weng (WAL)	743.5 lb
2	Mahon Ghosh (IND)	738 lb
3	Allen Salter (CAN)	716 lb
4	Winston Bourne (BAR)	705 lb
5	Arun K. Das (IND)	694 lb
6	Joseph Charles Brancatisano (AUS)	688.5 lb
7	Ghye H. Tang (SIN)	666.5 lb
8	Bruce Cameron (NZL)	639 lb
-	G. Shepherd (GUY)	ns
-	Clyde Morris (TTO)	ns
-	Lewis Kok Shun (MRI)	sn

=== Lightweight 67.5kg ===
Pos	Athlete	Weight
1	Hugo Gittens (TTO)	809.75 lb
2	George Newton (ENG)	782.25 lb
3	Ieuan Owen (WAL)	771 lb
4	Maurice King (SVG)	771 lb
5	Marcel Bedard (CAN)	754.75 lb
6	W. Lewis (GUY)	743.5 lb
7	Jimmy Moir (SCO)	732.75 lb
8	Kim S. Boo (SIN)	721.5 lb
9	Paul Ross (NIR)	710.5 lb
10	(British Honduras) Arthur Francisco (BIZ)	644.5 lb
11	Edward Young (JAM)	628 lb
-	(British Honduras) Arthur C. Pollard	ns
-	Lakshmi Das (IND)	ns
-	Sek Tong Cheah (MAS)	ns

=== Middleweight 75kg ===
Pos	Athlete	Weight
1	Pierre St.-Jean (CAN)	892.5 lb
2	Horace Johnson (WAL)	843 lb
3	Russell Perry (AUS)	821 lb
4	J. France (GUY)	793.5 lb
5	Laurie Levine (ENG)	787.75 lb
6	John Bolton (NZL)	787.75 lb
7	Cedric Demetrius (JAM)	754.75 lb
8	Alex McAfee (NIR)	727 lb
-	Tan Howe Liang (SIN)	ns
-	Tong A. Teo (MAS)	ns

=== Light Heavyweight 82.5kg ===
Pos	Athlete	Weight
1	George Vakakis (AUS)	925.5 lb
2	Sylvanus Blackman (ENG)	914.5 lb
3	Mike Pearman (ENG)	903.5 lb
4	David Harry (TTO)	898 lb
5	Earl Jack (CAN)	854 lb
6	Hal Springer (BAR)	843 lb
7	Kenneth G. Gordon (JAM)	815.5 lb
8	Keith Bailey (JAM)	749 lb
9	Alan A. Tang Yan (MRI)	705 lb
-	Rudolph James (GUY)	ns
-	Peter Arthur (WAL)	ns
-	Phil Caira (SCO)	ns
-	Meng S. Yap (MAS)	ns

=== Middle Heavyweight 90kg ===
Pos	Athlete	Weight
1	Louis Martin (ENG)	1019.25 lb
2	George Manners (ENG)	947.75 lb
3	Dudley Lawson (JAM)	931 lb
4	Paul Bjarnason (CAN)	920 lb
5	Leslie Pedlar (JAM)	771.25 lb
6	Graeme Hall (AUS)	ns
7	Chim Seong Leong (MAS)	ns

=== Heavyweight 110kg ===
Pos	Athlete	Weight
1	Don Oliver (NZL)	1096.25 lb
2	Arthur Shannos (AUS)	1024.75 lb
3	Brandon Bailey (TTO)	1019.5 lb
4	Terry Perdue (WAL)	936.5 lb
5	Jim Ferguson (SCO)	ns

== See also ==
- List of Commonwealth Games medallists in weightlifting
