= Weightlifting at the 1978 Commonwealth Games =

- Venue: Northern Alberta Jubilee Auditorium
- Location: Edmonton, Canada
- Dates: 3 to 12 August 1978

Weightlifting at the 1978 Commonwealth Games was the eighth appearance of Weightlifting at the Commonwealth Games. The events were held in Edmonton, Canada, from 3 to 12 August 1978 and featured contests in ten weight classes (an increase of one from 1974).

The events took place at the Northern Alberta Jubilee Auditorium.

Australia topped the weightlifting medal table by virtue of winning more silver medals than Canada.

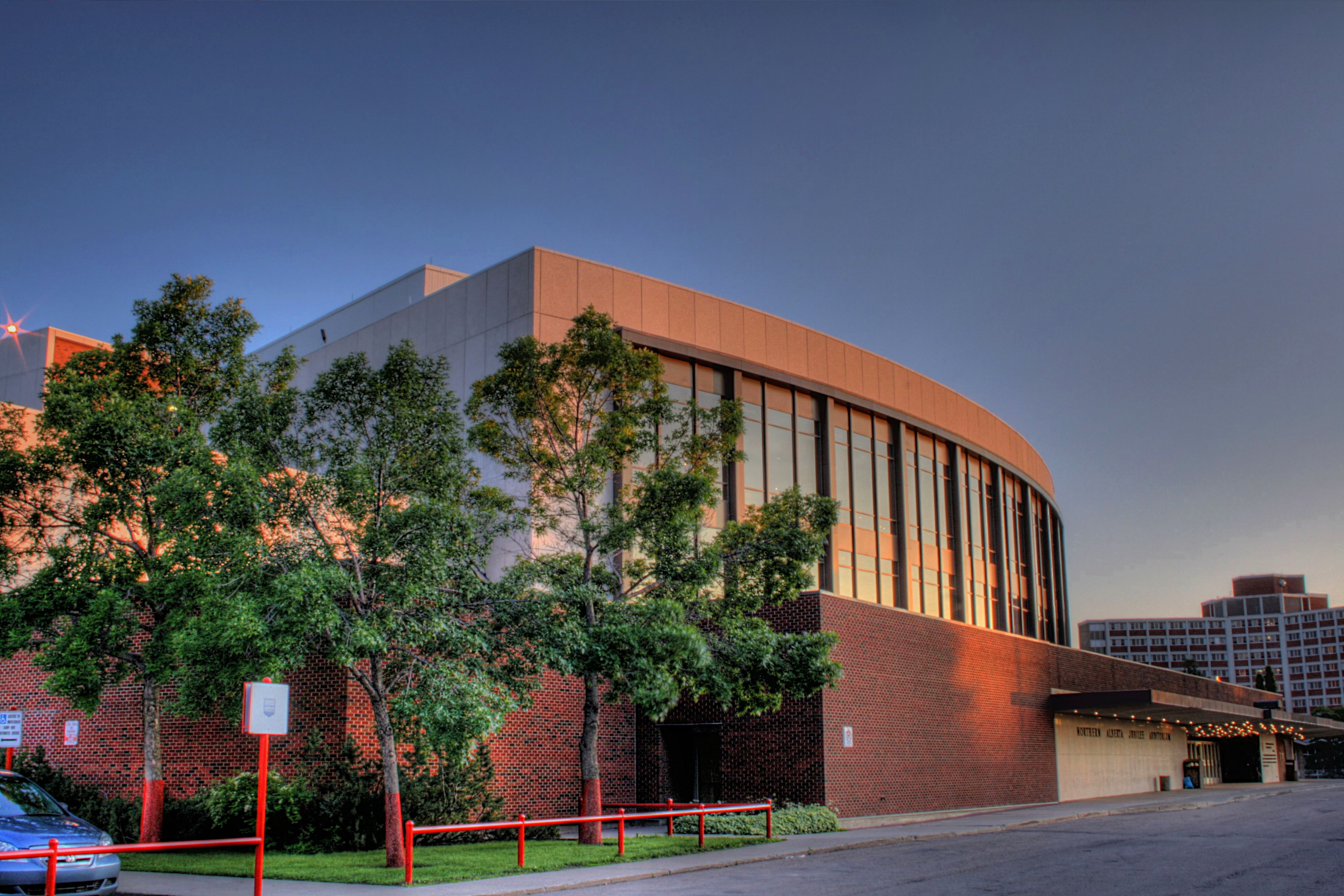
The Northern Alberta Jubilee Auditorium in 2009

== Medal table ==
* Host nation (Canada)

Medals won by nation with totals, ranked by number of golds—sortable
Rank	Nation	Gold	Silver	Bronze	Total
1	Australia	3	5	1	9
2	Canada*	3	2	2	7
3	England	1	1	3	5
4	India	1	1	0	2
5	New Zealand	1	0	2	3
6	Wales	1	0	1	2
7	Scotland	0	1	1	2
Totals (7 entries)		10	10	10	30

== Medal winners ==
Event	Gold	Silver	Bronze
Flyweight 52kg	Ekambaram Karunakaran; India	Charlie Revolta; Scotland	Roger Crabtree; Australia
Bantamweight 56kg	Precious McKenzie; New Zealand	M Tamil Selvan; India	Jeffrey Bryce; Wales
Featherweight 60kg	Michael Mercier; Canada	Ivan Katz; Australia	Darrell Schultz; Canada
Lightweight 67.5kg	Bill Stellios; Australia	Adrian Kebbe; Australia	Phillip Sue; New Zealand
Middleweight 75kg	Sam Castiglione; Australia	Newton Burrowes; England	Steve Pinsent; England
Light Heavyweight 82.5kg	Robert Kabbas; Australia	Charles Quagliata; Australia	Gary Shadbolt; England
Middle Heavyweight 90kg	Gary Langford; England	Terry Hadlow; Canada	Brian Marsden; New Zealand
Sub Heavyweight 100kg	John Burns; Wales	Steve Wyatt; Australia	Robert Santavy; Canada
Heavyweight 110kg	Russ Prior; Canada	Wayne Smith; Canada	Andy Drzewiecki; England
Super Heavyweight +110kg	Jean-Marc Cardinal; Canada	Bob Edmond; Australia	Jack Hynd; Scotland

== Results ==
=== Flyweight 52kg ===
Pos	Athlete	Kg
1	Ekambaram Karunakaran (IND)	205
2	Charlie Revolta (SCO)	197.5
3	Roger James Crabtree (AUS)	190
4	Anil Paul (IND)	187.5
-	John McNiven (SCO)	no total

=== Bantamweight 56kg ===
Pos	Athlete	Kg
1	Precious McKenzie (NZL)	220
2	Muniswamy Tamil Selvan (IND)	220
3	Jeffrey Bryce (WAL)	215
4	Anil Mondal (IND)	212.5
5	Leong Ah Wah (MAS)	197.5
-	Wia Pee Leung (SAM)	no total

=== Featherweight 60kg ===
Pos	Athlete	Kg
1	Michel Alex Mercier (CAN)	237.5
2	Ivan Eugene Katz (AUS)	235.0
3	Darrell Dwaine Schultz (CAN)	230.0
4	John Heron Craig (SCO)	212.5
5	Robert Michael Shepherd (WAL)	205.0
6	Philippe Yeung Wai Ping (MRI)	197.5
-	Victor Daniels (ENG)	no total
-	George Newton (NZL)	no total

=== Lightweight 67.5kg ===
Pos	Athlete	Kg
1	Basilios Stellios (AUS)	272.5
2	Adrian Kebbe (AUS)	267.5
3	Phillip Sue (NZL)	262.5
4	Robert William Kennedy (SCO)	252.5
5	Eric Ross Rogers (CAN)	247.5
6	Gary Ross Bratty (CAN)	247.5
7	Ieuan Owen (WAL)	245.0
8	John N. McCreadie (WAL)	225.0
9	Meafua Eneli (SAM)	207.5
10	Shan Koon Lai Cheong (MRI)	195.0
-	Alan Winterbourne (ENG)	no total
-	Kevin Welch (ENG)	no total

=== Middleweight 75kg ===
Pos	Athlete	Kg
1	Sam Castiglione (AUS)	300.0
2	Newton Burrowes (ENG)	290.0
3	Steve Pinsent (ENG)	290.0
4	Kaname Niimura (CAN)	280.0
5	Cecil Somerset Pollard (GUY)	255.0
6	John Rush (SCO)	240.0
7	Vaetolu Uria (SAM)	232.5
8	Absalom Shabangu (SWZ)	185.0
-	Tony Ebert (NZL)	no total

=== Light Heavyweight 82.5kg ===
Pos	Athlete	Weight
1	Robert Kabbas (AUS)	322.5
2	Charles Quagliata (AUS)	287.5
3	Gary Shadbolt (ENG)	277.5
4	Vala Veselani (SAM)	255.0
5	Bruce Bamford (NIR)	255.0
6	Hugh Wilson (TCA)	175.0
7	Michael Keelan (ENG)	no total
-	James Holland (SCO)	no total
-	Terry Bennett (WAL)	no total

=== Middle Heavyweight 90kg ===
Pos	Athlete	Weight
1	Gary Langford (ENG)	335.0
2	Terence Russell Hadlow (CAN)	330.0
3	Brian Marsden (NZL)	312.5
4	Gian Cheema Singh (ENG)	292.5
5	David Brown (WAL)	292.5
6	Alan Wilson Locking (WAL)	280.0
7	Saofai Taliano (SAM)	267.5
8	Laurence McConnell (NIR)	262.5
9	Daniel Brisco (TCA)	215.0

=== Sub Heavyweight 100kg ===
Pos	Athlete	Kg
1	John Burns (WAL)	340
2	Stephen John Wyatt (AUS)	325
3	Robert Santavy (CAN)	315
4	Ian Geoffrey Laurie (AUS)	312.5

=== Heavyweight 110kg ===
Pos	Athlete	Kg
1	Russ Prior (CAN)	347.5
2	Wayne Douglas Smith (CAN)	337.5
3	Andy Drzewiecki (ENG)	335.0
4	Rory Barrett (NZL)	332.5
5	Trevor Austin (JAM)	280.0

=== Super Heavyweight +110kg ===
Pos	Athlete	Kg
1	Jean Marc Cardinal (CAN)	365.0
2	Bob Edmond (AUS)	322.5
3	Jack Hynd (SCO)	305.0
4	Michael James Brown (WAL)	282.5
5	Viliamu Petelo Masoe (SAM)	282.5

== See also ==
- List of Commonwealth Games medallists in weightlifting
