= Wales at the 1970 British Commonwealth Games =

- CG code: WAL
- CGA: Wales at the Commonwealth Games
- Website: teamwales.cymru

in Edinburgh, Scotland
- Flag bearer: Terry Perdue
- Medals Ranked 12th: Gold 2 Silver 6 Bronze 4 Total 12

British Commonwealth Games appearances
- 1930; 1934; 1938; 1950; 1954; 1958; 1962; 1966; 1970; 1974; 1978; 1982; 1986; 1990; 1994; 1998; 2002; 2006; 2010; 2014; 2018; 2022; 2026; 2030

Wales competed at the 1970 British Commonwealth Games in Edinburgh, Scotland, from 16 to 25 July 1970.

The Welsh team was named on 21 May 1970 and consisted of 114 athletes.

Wales came 12th overall with 2 gold, 6 silver and 4 bronze medals.

== Medallists ==
=== Gold ===
- Lynn Davies (athletics)
- Mike Richards (swimming)

=== Silver ===
- Anthony Davies (boxing)
- Dai Davies (boxing)
- Ieuan Owen (weightlifting)
- Terry Perdue (weightlifting)
- Michael Richards (swimming)
- Martyn Woodroffe (swimming)

=== Bronze ===
- Peter Arthur (weightlifting)
- Martyn Woodroffe (swimming)
- Men's tandem (cycling)
- Men's 4×100 metres medley relay (swimming)

== Team ==
=== Athletics ===
Men

Athlete	Events	Club	Medals
Bob Adams	800m	Polytechnic Harriers	
Anthony Francis Ashton	5000m	Reading AC & Cambridge Univ	
Dai Hedydd Davies	marathon		
Howard Davies	200m, 4x100m	Birchfield Harriers	
Lynn Davies	100m, 4x100m, long jump	Cardiff AAC	Gold medal
Morris G. Davies	hammer throw	Gillingham AC	
Terry Davies	200m, 4x100m	Carmarthen Harriers	
Gwynn Clement Davis	1500m, 5000m	Aberystwyth Harriers	
John Martin Greatrex	800m	South London Harriers	
Gwynn Griffiths	400m	Wolverhampton & Bilston AC	
Peter James Llewellyn Griffiths	steeplechase	Hillingdon AC	
Bernard Louis Hayward	steeplechase	Cardiff AAC	
Kenneth William Holmes	javelin throw		
Alun Arthur James	100m hurdles	Carmarthen Harriers	
Ron Jones	100m	Enfield Harriers	
Alan L. Joslyn	10,000m	Polytechnic Harriers	
David Norman Lease	pole vault	Cardiff AAC	
Cyril T. Leigh	marathon		
John E. Lewis	400m hurdles		
Phillip John Lewis	800m	Oxford Univ	
Bob Maplestone	1500m	Cardiff AAC	
Ronald McAndrew	steeplechase	Reading AC	
Bernard John Plain	10,000m	Cardiff AAC	
Berwyn Price	100m hurdles	Cardiff AAC	
Roger C. Richardson	400m hurdles	Birchfield Harriers & B'ham Univ	
Richard David Rosser	20 miles walk		
Michael J. Rowland	marathon		
Nigel E. Sherlock	javelin throw	Borough Road College	
Phillip L. Thomas	1500m	Herne Hill Harriers & Cambridge Univ	
E. John Walters	shot put, discus throw	Cardiff AAC	
Graham J. Webb	triple jump	Cardiff AAC	
Gwynfryn John Williams	long jump	Cardiff AAC	
J. J. Williams	100, 200m, 4x100m	Cardiff CofE	

Women

Athlete	Events	Club	Medals
Thelwyn Bateman	800m	Coventry Godiva Harriers	
Christine Craig	high jump	Stretford AC	
Hillary Davies	100m, 200m, 4x100m	Epsom & Ewell AC	
Gloria Dourass	800m	Small Heath Harriers	
A. June Hirst	pentathlon	BP Llandarcy AC	
Ruth Martin-Jones	long jump, 4x100m, pentathlon	Birchfield Harriers & B'ham Univ	
Maureen Pearce	shot put	Flintshire College of Technology	
Pat Shiels	100m, 200m, 4x100m	Havering AC	
Michelle Smith	100m, 200m, 4x100m	Cardiff AAC	
Averil Williams	Javelin throw	Birchfield Harriers	

=== Badminton ===
Men

Athlete	Events	Club	Medals
Dave Colmer	singles, doubles	Steinberg BC	
Steve Gully	singles, doubles, mixed	Swansea BC	
Howard Jennings	singles, doubles, mixed	Steinberg BC	

Women

Athlete	Events	Club	Medals
Sue Hughes	doubles, mixed	Cwmbran BC	
Julie Stockden	doubles, mixed	Swansea BC	

=== Boxing ===
Athlete	Events	Club	Medals
Tony Davies	-48kg light-flyweight	Wingfield ABC, Llanbradach	Silver medal
Dai Davies	63.5kg light-welterweight	Bangor YMCA	Silver medal
Philip Davies	54kg bantamweight	Llandaff ABC	
Peter M. Lloyd	71kg light-middleweight	Army ABC	
Billie. J. May	75kg middleweight	Newport SC	
Mike McCluskie	67kg welterweight	Croeserw ABC	
Maurice O'Sullivan	51kg flyweight	Roath Youth ABC	
Marin Phillips	60kg lightweight	Llanelli	
Eddie V. Pritchard	57kg featherweight	Llangefni ABC	
Tony M. Roberts	81kg light-heavyweight	Cynmer Afan ABC, Port Talbot	

=== Cycling ===
Athlete	Events	Club	Medals
John Beswick	sprint, tandem	Deeside Olympic CC	Bronze medal
Mel Davies	scratch, time trial	Port Talbot Wheelers	
John Hatfield	sprint, tandem	Cwmcarn Paragon RC	Bronze medal
Grahame J. Jenkins	road race	Port Talbot Wheelers	
A. Milward	scratch, time trial, pursuit	Byways AC	
John Pritchard	pursuit	Port Talbot Wheelers	
D. Russell	sprint	Deeside Olympic CC	

=== Diving ===
Men

Athlete	Events	Club	Medals
Donald Bryce	springboard	Connah's Quay	

Women

Athlete	Events	Club	Medals
Jane F. Hamilton	springboard, platform	Morden Park	
Janice Parsons	springboard, platform	Cardiff	

=== Fencing ===
Men

Athlete	Events	Club	Medals
Ian Edwards	foil, team, sabre, team	Cardiff FC	
Derek J. Lucas	épée, team	Cardiff FC	
Andrew Reynolds	foil, team, sabre, team	Salle Reynolds FC	
P. S. Reynolds	épée, team		
Robert Reynolds	foil, team, sabre, team	Salle Reynolds FC	
Duncan R. Turner	épée, team	Salle Reynolds FC	

Women

Athlete	Events	Club	Medals
Julia M. Barkley	foil, team	Salle Reynolds FC	
Linda M. Brown	foil, team	Salle Reynolds FC	
Frances Reynolds	foil, team	Salle Reynolds FC	

=== Lawn bowls ===
Men

Athlete	Events	Club	Medals
Gwyn Howells	pairs	Penclawdd BC	
Leighton Jenkins	pairs	Penclawdd BC	
Evan Aeron John	fours	Cwmbran BC	
Roy Jones	fours	Cwmbran BC	
William E. Pattimore	fours	Cwmbran BC	
Harry Thompson	fours	Cwmbran BC	
Dai Wilkins	singles	Pontrhydyfen BC	

=== Swimming ===
Athlete	Events	Club	Medals
Vivian J. Davies	100, 200m breaststroke, 200 medley	Cardiff Otters	
Peter C. Godfrey	100, 200m butterfly	South Wales Police	
Nigel Johnson	100, 200m breaststroke, 4x100 medley	Millfield	Bronze medal
Gareth Roland Jones	200 backstroke,400m medley	Cardiff Otters	
Clive M. Lewis	100m backstroke	Newport	
Sean Maher	100, 400 free, 100m butterfly, 200, 400 medley	Newport	
Kevan Moran	100m free, 4x100 medley	Swansea SC	Bronze medal
Trevor G. Morgan	100, 200m breaststroke	Gloucester	
Martin Richards	400, 1500m free, 4x100 & 4x200m free relay	St James, Dulwich	
Michael Richards	100, 200m backstroke, 4x100m medley relay	Newport	,,
Nigel K. Simpson	100, 200m backstroke	Swansea	
Alan Williams	100, 200, 400m free		
Martyn Woodroffe	100, 200m butterfly, 200, 400 medley, 4x100 medley	Madeley College	,,

Women

Athlete	Events	Club	Medals
Bernadette Bowen	200, 400, 800m freestyle	Cardiff Otters	
Jacqueline Comins	100m butterfly, 200, 400m medley	Huddersfield	
Christine M. Davies	100, 200m breaststroke	Nottingham Northern	
Ceinwen B. Edwards	100, 200m breaststroke	Stoke Newington	
Sally A. Hurn	100, 200m freestyle, relay x 2	Newport	
Susan Jones	200, 400, 800m freestyle	Bristol	
Stephania Price	100m freestyle, relay	Bristol	
Gail F. Stephens	100, 200m backstroke, relay	Swansea Otters	
Cheryl Thomas	100m freestyle, relay	Llanelli	
Pat C. Wells	100, 200m breaststroke	Maindee Olympic	

=== Weightlifting ===
Athlete	Events	Club	Medals
Peter Arthur	82.5kg light-heavyweight	Bonymaen Comm. Centre	Bronze medal
Terry Bennett	75kg	Bonymaen Comm. Centre	
Horace Johnson	75kg middleweight	Rhyl Barbell C	
Peter Nitsch	90kg mid-heavyweight	Marlais WLC	
Ieuan Owen	67.5kg lightweight	Llanrug WLC	Silver medal
Terry Perdue	+110kg super-heavyweight	Bonymaen Comm. Centre	Silver medal
Chung Kum Weng	60kg	Cardiff Central BC	
D. Meurin Williams	56kg	Derian WLC	
Robert Wrench	82.5kg light-heavyweight	Hollyhead WLC	
