= Weightlifting at the 1962 British Empire and Commonwealth Games =

- Venue: South Perth City Hall
- Location: South Perth, Australia
- Dates: 22 November – 1 December 1962

Weightlifting at the 1962 British Empire and Commonwealth Games was the fourth appearance of Weightlifting at the Commonwealth Games. The events took place in the South Perth City Hall in South Perth, Australia and featured contests in seven weight classes.

England topped the weightlifting medal table with three gold medals.

== Medal table ==
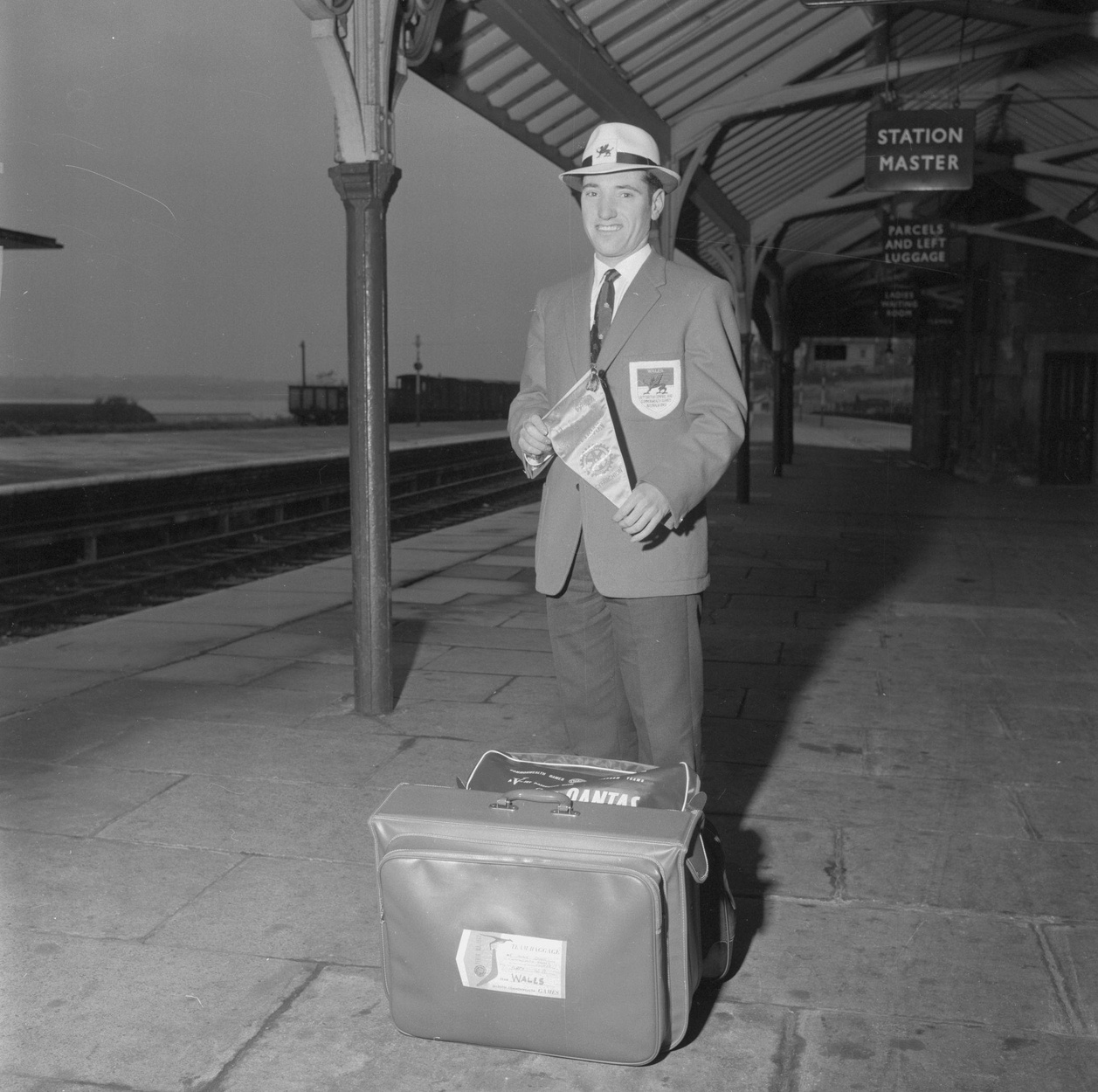
Welsh weightlifter Ieuan Owen on his way to Perth, 15 November 1962. Attribution:National Library of Wales

* Host nation (Australia)

Medals won by nation with totals, ranked by number of golds—sortable
Rank	Nation	Gold	Silver	Bronze	Total
1	England	3	1	0	4
2	Singapore	2	0	0	2
3	Australia*	1	1	0	2
4	Scotland	1	0	1	2
5	Canada	0	3	0	3
6	Wales	0	1	2	3
7	New Zealand	0	1	0	1
8	Trinidad and Tobago	0	0	2	2
9	British Guiana	0	0	1	1
9	Malaya	0	0	1	1
Totals (10 entries)		7	7	7	21

== Medal winners ==
Event	Gold	Silver	Bronze
Bantamweight	Chua Phung Kim; Singapore	Allen Salter; Canada	Martin Dias; British Guiana
Featherweight	George Newton; England	Ieuan Owen; Wales	Cheong Kam Hong; Malaya
Lightweight	Carlton Goring; England	Alan Oshyer; Australia	Jimmy Moir; Scotland
Middleweight	Tan Howe Liang; Singapore	Pierre St.-Jean; Canada	Horace Johnson; Wales
Light Heavyweight	Phil Caira; Scotland	George Manners; England	Peter Arthur; Wales
Middle Heavyweight	Louis Martin; England	Cosford White; Canada	Jackie Samuel; Trinidad and Tobago
Heavyweight	Arthur Shannos; Australia	Don Oliver; New Zealand	Brandon Bailey; Trinidad and Tobago

== Results ==
=== Bantamweight 56kg ===
Pos	Athlete	Weight
1	Chua Phung Kim (SIN)	710 lb
2	Allen Salter (CAN)	685 lb
3	Martin Dias (BGU)	675 lb
4	Muhammad Azam (PAK)	670 lb
5	Yok Sun Tan (CAN)	650 lb
6	Sam Coffa (AUS)	620 lb
7	Sammy Dalzell (NIR)	610 lb
8	D. Seeto Dat Kuin (PNG)	485 lb

=== Featherweight 60kg ===
Pos	Athlete	Weight
1	George Newton (ENG)	720 lb
2	Ieuan Owen (WAL)	645 lb
3	Cheong Kam Hong (MAL)	620 lb
4	Cliff Heuze (JEY)	575 lb

=== Lightweight 67.5kg ===
Pos	Athlete	Weight
1	Carlton Goring (ENG)	755 lb
2	Alan Oshyer (AUS)	750 lb
3	Jimmy Moir (SCO)	750 lb
4	Charles Misfud (MLT)	635 lb
5	C. M. Cheah (MAL)	ns
6	Kim S. Boo (SIN)	ns
7	Buster McShane (NIR)	ns

=== Middleweight 75kg ===
Pos	Athlete	Weight
1	Tan Howe Liang (SIN)	860 lb
2	Pierre St.-Jean (CAN)	830 lb
3	Horace Johnson (WAL)	820 lb
4	D.A. da Silva (DMA)	810 lb
5	Russell Pery (AUS)	800 lb
6	Kenneth G. Gordon (JAM)	795 lb
7	Ronald Roy Modra (AUS)	785 lb
8	Aldo Roy (CAN)	780 lb

=== Light Heavyweight 82.5kg ===
Pos	Athlete	Weight
1	Phil Caira (SCO)	900 lb
2	George Manners (ENG)	890 lb
3	Peter Arthur (WAL)	865 lb
4	Manny Santos (AUS)	ns

=== Middle Heavyweight 90kg ===
Pos	Athlete	Weight
1	Louis Martin (ENG)	1035 lb
2	Cosford White (CAN)	900 lb
3	Jackie Samuel (TRI)	880 lb
4	Leong Chim Seong (MAL)	875 lb
5	Jerry Shannos (AUS)	835 lb
6	William A. Scott (NZL)	800 lb
7	Dudley Lawson (JAM)	ns

=== Heavyweight 110kg ===
Pos	Athlete	Weight
1	Arthur Shannos (AUS)	1025 lb
2	Don Oliver (NZL)	1025 lb
3	Brandon Bailey (TRI)	970 lb
4	Vilitati Qumivutia (FIJ)	735 lb
5	David Prowse (ENG)	ns

== See also ==
- List of Commonwealth Games medallists in weightlifting
