= Weightlifting at the 1972 Summer Olympics – Men's 82.5 kg =

Weightlifting at the Olympics

82.5 kg at the Games of the XX Olympiad
- Venue: Weightlifting Hall 7, Gewichtheberhalle
- Dates: 2 September 1972
- Competitors: 24 from 20 nations

Medalists
1st place, gold medalist(s)		Leif Jenssen; Norway
2nd place, silver medalist(s)		Norbert Ozimek; Poland
3rd place, bronze medalist(s)		György Horváth; Hungary

In an out of competition attempt to break the world record, in the military press, Khristos Iakovou of Greece attempted a lift of 179.0 kg, his attempt failed. David Berger of Israel was one of the victims of the 5 September 1972, Munich Massacre.

== Results ==
Total of best lifts in military press, snatch and jerk. Ties are broken by the lightest bodyweight.

=== Final ===
Rank	Name	Nationality	Body weight	Military press (kg)				Snatch (kg)				Jerk (kg)				Total (kg)
Rank	Name	Nationality	Body weight	1	2	3	Result	1	2	3	Result	1	2	3	Result	Total (kg)
1st place, gold medalist(s)	Leif Jenssen	Norway	81.10	~~172.5~~	172.5	~~177.5~~	172.5	145.0	~~150.0~~	150.0	150.0 OR	180.0	185.0	~~190.0~~	185.0	507.5 OR
2nd place, silver medalist(s)	Norbert Ozimek	Poland	82.0	~~160.0~~	160.0	165.0	165.0	140.0	145.0	~~147.5~~	145.0	182.5	187.5	~~192.5~~	187.5	497.5
3rd place, bronze medalist(s)	György Horváth	Hungary	82.45	160.0	~~165.0~~	~~167.5~~	160.0	137.5	~~142.5~~	142.5	142.5	185.0	192.5	~~197.5~~	192.5 OR	495.0
4	Bernhard Radtke	East Germany	81.50	157.5	162.5	~~165.0~~	162.5	140.0	145.0	~~150.0~~	145.0	175.0	180.0	185.0	185.0	492.5
5	Khristos Iakovou	Greece	82.15	162.5	170.0	~~175.0~~	170.0	~~137.5~~	137.5	~~142.5~~	137.5	175.0	182.5	187.5	187.5	490.0
6	Kaarlo Kangasniemi	Finland	82.25	150.0	~~160.0~~	~~160.0~~	150.0	145.0	~~150.0~~	~~152.5~~	145.0	180.0	~~185.0~~	185.0	185.0	480.0
7	Rolf Milser	West Germany	81.70	160.0	165.0	~~170.0~~	165.0	~~132.5~~	132.5	~~137.5~~	132.5	180.0	~~185.0~~	~~185.0~~	180.0	477.5
8	Juhani Avellan	Finland	82.40	135.0	140.0	~~145.0~~	140.0	~~140.0~~	~~145.0~~	145.0	145.0	182.5	~~190.0~~	~~190.0~~	182.5	467.5
9	Dino Turcato	Italy	82.20	~~160.0~~	160.0	~~165.0~~	160.0	~~125.0~~	125.0	~~130.0~~	125.0	170.0	–	–	170.0	455.0
10	Reinhold Platzer	Austria	81.85	~~145.0~~	~~145.0~~	145.0	145.0	130.0	~~137.5~~	~~137.5~~	130.0	162.5	167.5	~~170.0~~	167.5	442.5
11	Mike Pearman	Great Britain	82.05	140.0	145.0	~~147.5~~	145.0	~~125.0~~	125.0	~~130.0~~	125.0	165.0	~~170.0~~	~~170.0~~	165.0	435.0
12	Brian Marsden	New Zealand	82.15	~~137.5~~	142.5	~~147.5~~	142.5	120.0	~~127.5~~	~~127.5~~	120.0	165.0	172.5	~~182.5~~	172.5	435.0
13	Anthony Ford	Great Britain	82.25	~~137.5~~	~~137.5~~	137.5	137.5	120.0	125.0	~~127.5~~	125.0	162.5	172.5	~~175.0~~	172.5	435.0
14	Ib Bergmann	Denmark	81.70	140.0	~~145.0~~	145.0	145.0	~~127.5~~	~~127.5~~	127.5	127.5	155.0	~~162.5~~	~~162.5~~	155.0	427.5
15	Luiz de Almeida	Brazil	81.40	~~140.0~~	140.0	~~147.5~~	140.0	115.0	~~120.0~~	120.0	120.0	165.0	~~175.0~~	~~175.0~~	165.0	425.0
16	Jože Urankar	Yugoslavia	81.55	135.0	142.5	145.0	145.0	120.0	~~125.0~~	~~127.5~~	120.0	160.0	~~165.0~~	~~165.0~~	160.0	425.0
17	Emilio Berroa	Dominican Republic	81.15	~~122.5~~	122.5	127.5	127.5	112.5	~~120.0~~	122.5	122.5	147.5	~~155.0~~	157.5	157.5	407.5
–	Walter Hauser	Switzerland	81.95	142.5	~~147.5~~	147.5	147.5	~~127.5~~	~~127.5~~	~~127.5~~	NVL					DNF
–	David Berger	Israel	81.80	132.5	~~140.0~~	~~140.0~~	132.5	~~122.5~~	122.5	~~130.0~~	122.5	~~165.0~~	~~165.0~~	~~165.0~~	NVL	DNF
–	Mike Karchut	United States	81.60	155.0	160.0	~~162.5~~	160.0	140.0	145.0	~~147.5~~	145.0	~~185.0~~	–	–	NVL	DNF
–	Víctor Ángel Pagán	Puerto Rico	80.80	~~137.5~~	~~137.5~~	~~137.5~~	NVL									
–	Abel López	Cuba	81.85	~~160.0~~	~~160.0~~	~~160.0~~	NVL									
–	Boris Pavlov	Soviet Union	81.85	~~167.5~~	~~167.5~~	~~167.5~~	NVL									
–	Valery Shary	Soviet Union	82.00	~~170.0~~	~~170.0~~	~~170.0~~	NVL									

Key: OR = Olympic record; DNF = did not finish; NVL = no valid lift
