= Weightlifting at the 1964 Summer Olympics – Men's 82.5 kg =

Weightlifting at the Olympics

Men's 82.5 kg at the Games of the XVIII Olympiad
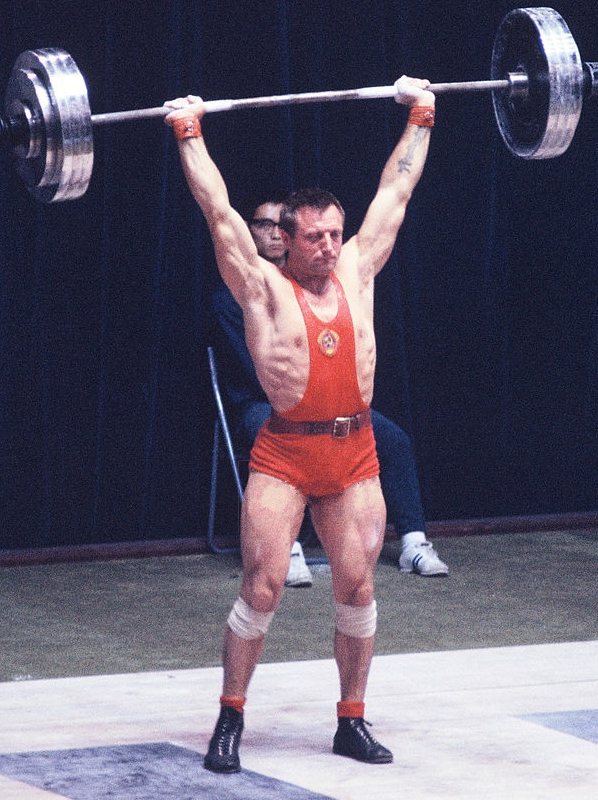
- Rudolf Plyukfelder, the gold medal winner at 1964 Olympics
- Venue: Shibuya Public Hall
- Date: 16 October 1964
- Competitors: 24 from 21 nations
- Winning total: 475.0 kg OR

Medalists
| 1st place, gold medalist(s) | | Rudolf Plyukfelder | Soviet Union |
| 2nd place, silver medalist(s) | | Géza Tóth | Hungary |
| 3rd place, bronze medalist(s) | | Győző Veres | Hungary |

The men's 82.5 kg weightlifting competitions at the 1964 Summer Olympics in Tokyo took place on 16 October at the Shibuya Public Hall. It was the tenth appearance of the light heavyweight class.

== Results ==
| Rank | Name | Country | kg |
|---|---|---|---|
| 1 | Rudolf Plyukfelder | Soviet Union | 475.0 |
| 2 | Géza Tóth | Hungary | 467.5 |
| 3 | Győző Veres | Hungary | 467.5 |
| 4 | Jerzy Kaczkowski | Poland | 457.5 |
| 5 | Gary Cleveland | United States | 455.0 |
| 6 | Lee Hyeong-U | South Korea | 452.5 |
| 7 | Kaarlo Kangasniemi | Finland | 450.0 |
| 8 | Karl Arnold | United Team of Germany | 440.0 |
| 9 | Jaakko Kailajärvi | Finland | 435.0 |
| 10 | Sylvanus Blackman | Great Britain | 427.5 |
| 11 | Stancho Penchev | Bulgaria | 425.0 |
| 12 | Reza Estaki | Iran | 420.0 |
| 13 | Amer El-Hanafi | Egypt | 417.5 |
| 14 | Fortunato Rijna | Netherlands Antilles | 410.0 |
| 15 | George Manners | Great Britain | 410.0 |
| 16 | René Battaglia | Monaco | 407.5 |
| 17 | George Vakakis | Australia | 405.0 |
| 18 | Gerhard Hastik | Austria | 397.5 |
| 19 | Artemio Rocamora | Philippines | 390.0 |
| 20 | Mustapha Adnane | Morocco | 390.0 |
| 21 | Cheng Cheng-chung | Chinese Taipei | 385.0 |
| AC | Martín Eguiguren | Argentina | 110.0 |
| AC | Marcel Paterni | France | 280.0 |
| AC | Lim Hiang Kok | Malaysia | DNF |
