= Eguiguren =

Eguiguren is a surname. Notable people with the surname include:

- Francisco Eguiguren Correa (born 1967), Chilean Business Administrator and politician
- Jesús Eguiguren (born 1954), Spanish academic, jurist, President of the Basque Parliament
- José Javier Eguiguren (1816–1884), acting President of Ecuador
- José Manuel Eguiguren Urrejola (1811–1883), Chilean politician and lawyer
- Julián Carlos Andiano Eguiguren (born 1951), Spanish racing cyclist
- Luis A. Eguiguren (1887–1967), Peruvian educator, magistrate, historian and politician
- Macarena Campomanes Eguiguren (born 1964), Spanish amateur golfer
- Manuel Eguiguren Galarraga (1930–2012), the Roman Catholic titular bishop of Salapia, Bolivia
- Martín Eguiguren (born 1941), Argentine weightlifter
- Maximiano Errázuriz Eguiguren (born 1945), Chilean conservative politician
