= Darsigny =

Darsigny is a surname. Notable people with the surname include:

- Shad Darsigny (born 2003), Canadian weightlifter
- Tali Darsigny (born 1998), Canadian weightlifter
- Yvan Darsigny (born 1966), Canadian weightlifter
