= Berroa (surname) =

Berroa is a surname. Notable people with the surname include:

- Ángel Berroa (born 1977), Dominican baseball coach and former player
- Billy Berroa (1928–2007), Dominican broadcaster
- Catalina Berroa (1849–1911), Cuban pianist, music teacher, and composer
- Emilio Berroa (born 1946), Dominican weightlifter
- Federico Martínez Berroa (born 1996), Uruguayan footballer
- Gerónimo Berroa (born 1965), Dominican baseball player
- Ignacio Berroa (born 1953), Cuban jazz drummer
- José Manuel Jiménez Berroa (1851–1917), Cuban pianist and composer
- Prelander Berroa (born 2000), Dominican professional baseball player
- Rei Berroa (1914–2000), Dominican-American poet, university professor, literary and cultural critic, and translator
