= Platzer =

Platzer is a surname. Notable people with the surname include:

- Alexandra Platzer (born 1986), Austrian politician
- Birgit Platzer (born 1993), Austrian luger
- Jacob Platzer, Italian luger
- Johann Georg Platzer (1704–1761), Austrian painter and draughtsman
- Kyle Platzer (born 1995), Canadian hockey player
- Martin Platzer (born 1963), Austrian ice hockey player
- Norwin Platzer (born 1962), Swiss handball player
- Peter Platzer (1910–1959), Austrian footballer
- Reinhold Platzer (born 1939), Austrian weightlifter
- Tomas Platzer (born 1969), German bobsledder and skeleton racer
