= Urankar =

Urankar is a surname. Notable people with the surname include:

- Anze Urankar (born 1997), Slovenian male canoeist
- Jože Urankar (1939–2021), Slovenian weightlifter
