= John McNiven (weightlifter) =

Scottish weightlifter (1935–2024)

Personal information
- Born: 12 June 1935 Glasgow, Scotland
- Died: 26 June 2024 (aged 89)

Sport
- Sport: Weightlifting
- Event: Bantamweight
- Club: Glasgow Sports Centre
Medal record
Men's weightlifting
Representing Scotland
Commonwealth Games
Bronze medal – third place	1970 Edinburgh	Flyweight
Bronze medal – third place	1974 Christchurch	Flyweight

John McNiven MBE (12 June 1935 – 26 June 2024) was a Scottish weightlifter who competed at six Commonwealth Games, winning two bronze medals at the 1970 Commonwealth Games and the 1974 Commonwealth Games.

== Biography ==
McNiven won twenty five Scottish National championships. He also competed in 18 World Masters events, winning 14 of them. McNiven was the first weightlifter to receive the World Masters Hall of Fame Award in 1993.

McNiven represented the Scotland team at the 1966 British Empire and Commonwealth Games in Kingston, Jamaica, where he participated in 56kg bantamweight category.

McNiven represented the 1970 Scottish team at the 1970 British Commonwealth Games in Edinburgh, Scotland, where he competed in the 52kg flyweight category and won a bronze medal behind Australian George Vassiliadis. Four years later he attended a third Commonwealth Games when he was selected the 1974 Scottish team at the 1974 British Commonwealth Games in Christchurch, New Zealand, where he once again competed in the flyweight category and won another bronze medal, this time behind Precious McKenzie of England.

He subsequently went to six consecutive games by featuring in the 1978 Commonwealth Games, 1982 Commonwealth Games and 1986 Commonwealth Games. McNiven was the flag bearer for Scotland at the 1982 Commonwealth Games in Brisbane after he replaced Jack Hynd who was unable to carry the flag due to ill health.

McNiven also worked as a fitter for Regional Railways; he was appointed Member of the Order of the British Empire (MBE) in the 1994 New Year Honours for services to the sport of weightlifting. He was inducted into the Scottish Sports Hall of Fame in 2003. McNiven died on 26 June 2024, at the age of 89.
