= Brian Saunders =

Brian Saunders may refer to:

- Brian Saunders (sound engineer), American sound engineer
- Brian Saunders (weightlifter), English weightlifter

== See also ==
- Bryan Saunders (1952–2022), Canadian sprinter
- Bryan Lewis Saunders (born 1969), performance artist, videographer, and performance poet
