= Tony Ford =

Tony or Anthony Ford may refer to:

- Tony Ford (footballer, born 1944), former English football player and manager, played for both Bristol clubs, managed Hereford and Hearts
- Tony Ford (footballer, born 1959), former English footballer, made 931 league appearances for clubs including Grimsby, Stoke, West Bromwich and Mansfield
- Tony Ford (judge) (1942–2020), New Zealand judge
- Tony Ford (weightlifter) (born 1939), former English Olympic weightlifter
- Tony Ford (rugby league) (born 1946), Australian rugby player

== See also ==
- Anthony Forde (disambiguation)
