= Jimmy Moir (weightlifter) =

British weightlifter

Personal information
- Born: c. 1936 Scotland

Sport
- Sport: Weightlifting
- Event: Lightweight
- Club: Viking WC, Glasgow
Medal record
Representing Scotland
Commonwealth Games
Bronze medal – third place	1962 Perth	67.5kg lightweight

James S. Moir (born c.1936) is a British weightlifter from Scotland, who represented Scotland at the British Empire and Commonwealth Games (now Commonwealth Games).

== Biography ==
Moir was a member of the Viking Weightlifting Club in Glasgow and represented the 1958 Scottish team at the 1958 British Empire and Commonwealth Games in Cardiff, Wales.

He represented the 1962 Scottish Team at the 1962 British Empire and Commonwealth Games in Perth, Australia, participating in the 67.5kg lightweight event, winning the bronze medal behind Carlton Goring and Alan Oshyer.

Moir competed at the 1964 British Championship and Olympic Trials and then attended a third games at the 1966 British Empire and Commonwealth Games.

He later emigrated to Canada and won the silver medal at the World Powerlifting Championships in 1977 for Canada.
