= Olivia Baker =

Olivia Baker may refer to:

- Olivia Baker (weightlifter) (born 1979), New Zealand Olympic weightlifter
- Olivia Baker (runner) (born 1996), American middle-distance runner
