= Stephen Wyatt (weightlifter) =

Australian weightlifter (born 1950)

Personal information
- Nationality: Australian
- Born: 26 March 1950 (age 75)

Sport
- Sport: Weightlifting

Stephen Wyatt (born 26 March 1950) is an Australian weightlifter. He competed in the men's heavyweight event at the 1976 Summer Olympics.
