= Walter Hauser (weightlifter) =

Swiss weightlifter (born 1943)

Personal information
- Nationality: Swiss
- Born: 23 September 1943
- Died: 3 June 2019 (aged 75)

Sport
- Sport: Weightlifting

Walter Hauser (23 September 1943 – 3 June 2019) was a Swiss weightlifter. He competed in the men's light heavyweight event at the 1972 Summer Olympics.
