= Natasha Barker =

Australian weightlifter (born 1970)

Personal information
- Full name: Natasha Jane Barker
- Nationality: Australian
- Born: 30 November 1970 (age 55) Sydney, Australia
- Height: 153 cm (5 ft 0 in)
- Weight: 52 kg (115 lb)

Sport
- Country: Australia
- Sport: Weightlifting
- Weight class: 53 kg
- Club: Burwood PCYC
- Team: National team
- Coached by: Luke Borreggine
- Retired: 2006
Medal record
Commonwealth Games
| Silver medal – second place | 2002 Manchester | 53 kg clean & jerk |
| Silver medal – second place | 2002 Manchester | 53 kg snatch |
| Silver medal – second place | 2002 Manchester | 53 kg combined |
| Bronze medal – third place | 2006 Melbourne | 58 kg combined |
- Updated on 27 September 2016

Natasha Jane Barker (born 30 November 1970 in Sydney) is an Australian weightlifter, competing in the 53 kg category and representing Australia at international competitions.

She participated at the 2000 Summer Olympics in the 58 kg event. She competed at world championships, most recently at the 2002 World Weightlifting Championships.

She was silver medallist in the 53kg category at the 2002 Commonwealth Games in Manchester, UK; and won a bronze medal in the 58kg division at the 2006 Commonwealth Games in Melbourne, Australia.

== Major results ==
| Year | Venue | Weight | Snatch (kg) | | | | Clean & Jerk (kg) | | | | Total | Rank |
| Year | Venue | Weight | 1 | 2 | 3 | Rank | 1 | 2 | 3 | Rank | Total | Rank |
Summer Olympics
| 2000 | Sydney, Australia | 58 kg | | | | —N/a | | | | —N/a | | 10 |
World Championships
| 2002 | Warsaw, Poland | 53 kg | 72.5 | 77.5 | ~~80~~ | 11 | 92.5 | ~~97.5~~ | ~~97.5~~ | 15 | 170 | 12 |
| 1999 | Piraeus, Greece | 58 kg | 72.5 | 77.5 | ~~80~~ | 23 | 92.5 | 97.5 | 100 | 23 | 177.5 | 24 |
