= Anthony Forde =

Anthony Forde may refer to:

- Anthony Forde (darts player) (born 1962), Barbardian darts player
- Anthony Forde (footballer) (born 1993), Irish footballer

== See also ==
- Tony Ford (disambiguation), various people
