= Newton Burrowes =

British weightlifter

Personal information
- Nationality: Jamaican/English
- Born: 5 June 1955 (age 71)
Medal record
weightlifting
Representing England
Commonwealth Games
Silver medal – second place	1978 Edmonton	75kg middleweight
Gold medal – first place	1982 Brisbane	82.5kg light-heavyweight

Newton Burrowes (born 1955), is a male Jamaican born former weightlifter who competed for Great Britain and England.

== Weightlifting career ==
Burrowes represented Great Britain in the 1980 Summer Olympics and the 1984 Summer Olympics.

He represented England and won a silver medal in the 75 kg middleweight division, at the 1978 Commonwealth Games in Edmonton, Alberta, Canada. Four years later he represented England and won a gold medal in the 82.5 kg light-heavyweight division, at the 1982 Commonwealth Games in Brisbane, Queensland, Australia.
