= Sudhir Kumar Chitradurga =

Indian weightlifter (born 1979)

Sudhir Kumar Chitradurga Padma Raju (born 13 April 1979) is an Indian weightlifter. He won the bronze medal in the Men's 69 kg category at the 2006 Commonwealth Games, with a combined lift of 287 kilograms.
