= Bernhard Radtke =

German weightlifter

Personal information
- Nationality: East German
- Born: 26 April 1949 (age 75); Erfurt, Soviet occupation zone of Germany

Sport
- Sport: Weightlifting

Bernhard Radtke (born 26 April 1949) is a former East German weightlifter. He competed in the men's light heavyweight event at the 1972 Summer Olympics.
