= Collins Okothnyawallo =

Kenyan weightlifter

Personal information
- Nationality: Kenyan
- Born: 9 May 1973 (age 52)

Sport
- Sport: Weightlifting

Collins Okothnyawallo (born 9 May 1973) is a Kenyan former weightlifter. He competed in the men's heavyweight I event at the 1996 Summer Olympics.
