= Bill Pattimore =

Welsh lawn bowler

Personal information
- Nationality: British (Welsh)
- Born: 1 March 1892 Newport, Wales
- Died: September 1975 Merthyr Tydfil, Wales

Sport
- Sport: Lawn bowls
- Club: Cwmbran BC

William "Bill" Edward Pattimore (1 March 1892 – September 1975) was an international lawn bowler from Wales who competed at the Commonwealth Games.

== Biography ==
Pattimore was a member of the Cwmbran Bowls Club and was the runner up in the pairs at the Welsh National Bowls Championships in 1955.

In 1958 Pattimore was a landscape gardener by profession and lived at 103 Cocker Avenue in Cwmbran.

At the age of 78, Pattimore represented the Welsh team, at the 1970 British Commonwealth Games in Edinburgh, Scotland. He participated in the fours competition with Harry Thompson, Roy Jones and Aeron John, finishing in fifth place.
