= Dave Baillie =

Canadian weightlifter (1928–1977)

Competition record

Men's Weightlifting

Representing Canada

Commonwealth Games
| Silver medal – second place | 1954 Vancouver | +90 kg |
| Silver medal – second place | 1958 Vancouver | +90 kg |

Olympic Games
| 5th | 1952 Helsinki | +90 kg |
| 6th | 1956 Melbourne | +90 kg |
| 6th | 1960 Rome | +90 kg |

William David "Dave" Baillie (June 10, 1928 – November 25, 1977) was a Canadian weightlifter who is best known for earning the silver medal at the 1954 and 1958 Commonwealth Games in the superheavyweight category. Baillie competed at the 1952 Olympic Games finishing 5th and the 1956 and 1960 Olympic Games finishing in 6th place each time. He was born in Montreal, Quebec and died in Morin-Heights, Quebec.
