= Dave Hancock (weightlifter) =

English weightlifter

Personal information
- Nationality: British (English)
- Born: 11 December 1945 Chesterfield, England
- Died: February 1993 (aged 47) Mansfield, England

Sport
- Sport: Weightlifting
- Event: Heavyweight
Medal record
Weightlifting
Representing England
Commonwealth Games
Silver medal – second place	1970 Edinburgh	-110kg Combined

David 'Dave' Joseph S Hancock (11 December 1945 – February 1993), was a male weightlifter who competed at the 1972 Summer Olympics.

== Biography ==
Hancock represented England in the -110 kg heavyweight event, at the 1970 British Commonwealth Games in Edinburgh, Scotland, where he won a silver medal.

At the 1972 Olympic Games in Munich, Hancock represented Great Britain in the 110 kg category.

Two years later he competed again for England at the 1974 British Commonwealth Games in Christchurch, New Zealand.
