= Aeron John =

Welsh lawn bowler

Personal information
- Nationality: British (Welsh)
- Born: Bedwellty, Wales March 1936

Sport
- Sport: Lawn bowls
- Club: Rhymney Royal BC; Cwmbran BC

Evan "Aeron" John (born March 1936) is a former international lawn bowler from Wales who competed at the Commonwealth Games.

== Biography ==
Aeron John followed his father Wilf John into bowls. Initially he bowled for the same club as his father, the Rhymney Royal Bowls Club and partnering his father they finished pairs runner-up in the 1962 Welsh National Bowls Championships.

John switched clubs, joining the Cwmbran Bowls Club and in 1966 he was capped by Wales for the 1966 World Outdoor Bowls Championship, where he partnered Brian Maund in the pairs and also participated in the rinks.

John represented the Welsh team, at the 1970 British Commonwealth Games in Edinburgh, Scotland, where he participated in the fours competition with Harry Thompson, Bill Pattimore and Roy Jones, finishing in fifth place.

In 1979 he finished runner-up in the Welsh Nationals in the fours.
