= Gary Langford =

British weightlifter (born 1953)

Personal information
- Nationality: English
- Born: 14 March 1953 (age 73) Oxford, Oxfordshire
Medal record
weightlifting
Representing England
Commonwealth Games
Gold medal – first place	1978 Edmonton	90kg middle-heavyweight
Silver medal – second place	1982 Brisbane	100kg sub-heavyweight

Gary Leroy Langford (born 1953), is a male former weightlifter who competed for Great Britain and England.

== Weightlifting career ==
Langford represented Great Britain in the 1976 Summer Olympics and the 1980 Summer Olympics.

He represented England and won a gold medal in the 90 kg middle-heavyweight, at the 1978 Commonwealth Games in Edmonton, Alberta, Canada. Four years later he represented England and won a silver medal in the 100 kg sub-heavyweight division, at the 1982 Commonwealth Games in Brisbane, Queensland, Australia.
