= Steve Kettner =

Australian weightlifter (born 1969)

Personal information
- Nationality: Australian
- Born: 7 May 1969 (age 57) Albury, New South Wales, Australia

Sport
- Sport: Weightlifting
Medal record
Commonwealth Games
Bronze medal – third place	1990 Auckland	Men's Super Heavyweight – Overall
Bronze medal – third place	1990 Auckland	Men's Super Heavyweight – Clean and Jerk
Bronze medal – third place	1990 Auckland	Men's Super Heavyweight – Snatch
Gold medal – first place	1994 Victoria BC	Men's Heavyweight – Snatch
Silver medal – second place	1994 Victoria BC	Men's Heavyweight – Overall
Silver medal – second place	1994 Victoria BC	Men's Heavyweight – Clean and Jerk

Steve Kettner (born 7 May 1969) is an Australian former weightlifter. He competed at the 1992 Summer Olympics and the 1996 Summer Olympics.
