= Northern Alberta Jubilee Auditorium =

Performing arts venue and cultural facility in Edmonton, Canada

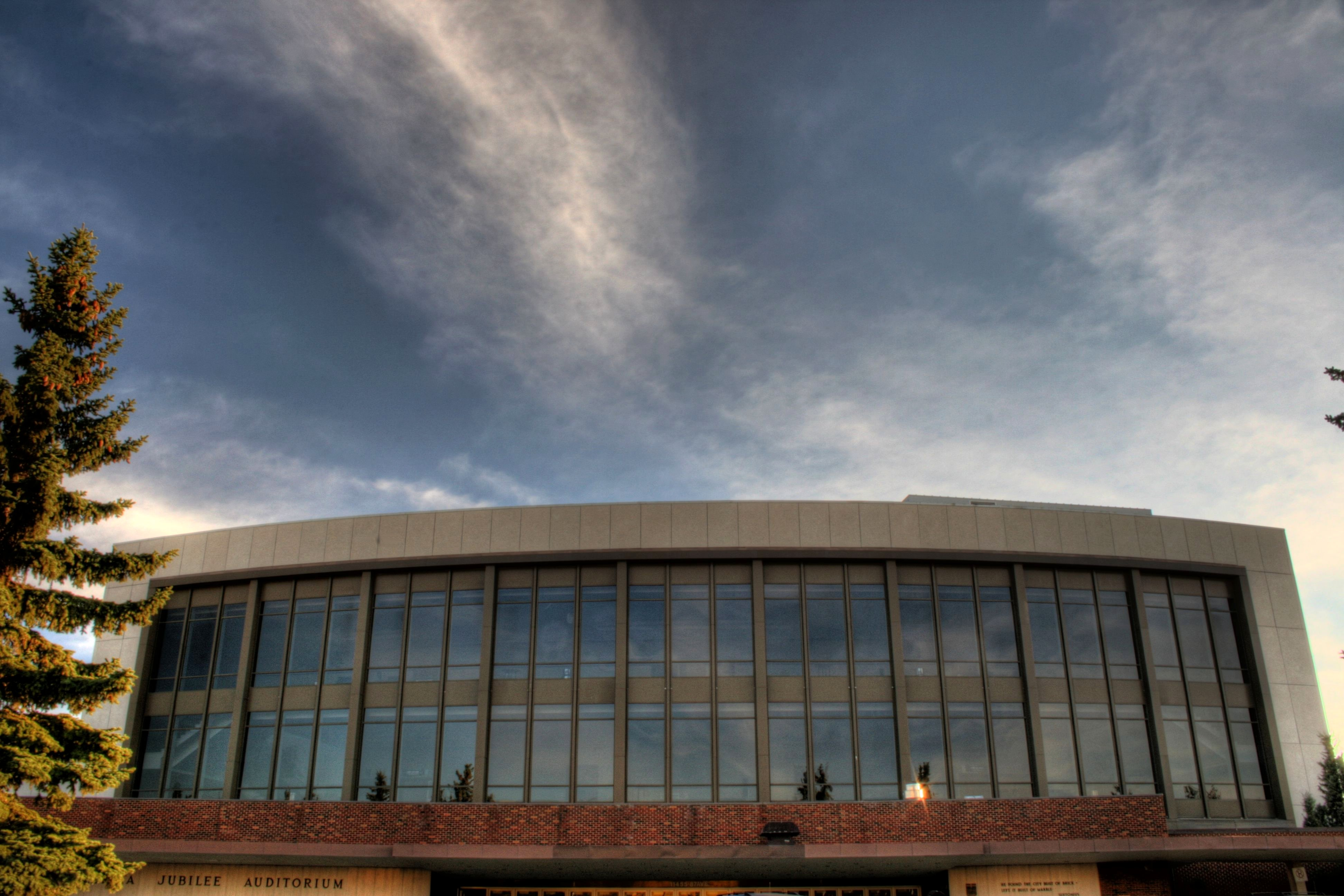
- Northern Alberta Jubilee Auditorium
- Interactive map of Northern Alberta Jubilee Auditorium
- Address: 11455 87 Ave; Edmonton, Alberta; T6G 2T2
- Coordinates: 53.5219°N 113.5289°W
- Owner: Government of Alberta
- Operator: Government of Alberta
- Capacity: 2,538 (2,416 when Orchestra pit in use)
- Type: Performing arts centre
- Public transit: Health Sciences/Jubilee station

Construction
- Opened: 1957

Tenants
- Edmonton Opera, Alberta Ballet, Canada's Ukrainian Shumka Dancers

Website
- www.jubileeauditorium.com/edmonton

The Northern Alberta Jubilee Auditorium is a 4-million-cubic-foot (110,000 m^{3}) performing arts, culture and community facility, located in Edmonton, Alberta, Canada.

== General information ==
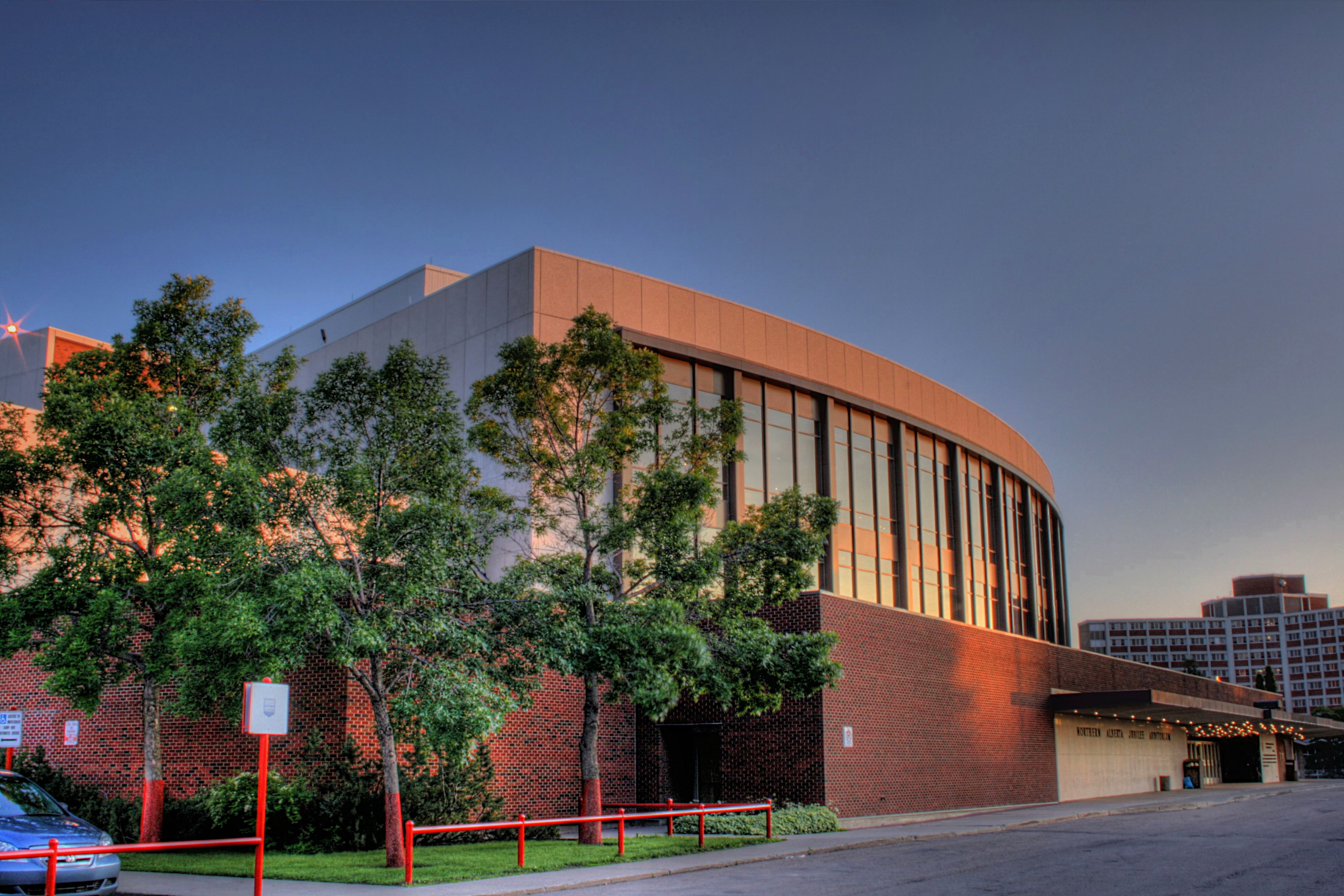
Northern Alberta Jubilee Auditorium

The Jubilee is home to the Edmonton Opera, Ukrainian Shumka Dancers and the Alberta Ballet. In addition to opera, ballet, and dance performances, for many years it has hosted Broadway shows, stand-up comedians, theatre productions, recording artists, concert bands, orchestras, cultural festivals, and awards ceremonies.

The main theatre hosts 2,538 people on three levels, or 2,416 if the Orchestra pit is in use. There is also a banquet room, meeting room, rehearsal hall and luxury suite available to rent, along with being able to hold trade shows and meetings in the theatre proper and its lobbies.

== History ==
The auditorium was built in 1957, on a 13-acre (53,000 m^{2}) site adjacent to the University of Alberta to celebrate the 50th anniversary of Alberta. It is owned and operated by the Government of Alberta. British rock band Procol Harum performed on November 18, 1971, along with the Edmonton Symphony Orchestra, the show was recorded and later released as a live album, entitled Procol Harum Live: In Concert with the Edmonton Symphony Orchestra.

The auditorium hosted the weightlifting events at the 1978 Commonwealth Games.

In 2005 as part of the celebrations for the Alberta Centennial, the auditorium underwent extensive renovations totalling a cost of $91 million.

In January 2010, theatre reviewer Pollstar revealed that the Northern Alberta Jubilee Auditorium was the busiest theatre in Canada, selling 146,555 tickets in 2009, beating its twin, the Southern Alberta Jubilee Auditorium in Calgary (138,515 tickets) and Toronto’s Massey Hall (93,742 tickets).

== See also ==
- List of Commonwealth Games venues
- Southern Alberta Jubilee Auditorium
