= Terry Hughes (weightlifter) =

New Zealand weightlifter (born 1964)

Personal information
- Born: 7 March 1964 (age 62)
Medal record
Men's Weightlifting
Representing New Zealand
Commonwealth Games
Bronze medal – third place	2002 Manchester	62 kg Clean & Jerk
Bronze medal – third place	2002 Manchester	62 kg Total

Terry Hughes (born 7 March 1964) is a former weightlifting competitor for New Zealand.

At the 2002 Commonwealth Games in Manchester he won two bronze medals in the 62 kg Clean and jerk and the 62 kg combined total.
