= Artemio Rocamora =

Filipino weightlifter (born 1934)

Personal information
- Nationality: Filipino
- Born: June 29, 1934 (age 90)

Sport
- Sport: Weightlifting

Artemio E. Rocamora (born June 29, 1934) is a Filipino weightlifter. He competed in the men's light heavyweight event at the 1964 Summer Olympics. Rocamora was also a member of the Philippine Air Force.
