= Serge Tremblay =

Canadian weightlifter

Personal information
- Full name: Serge Tremblay
- Born: 27 March 1973 (age 53) La Malbaie, Canada
- Height: 170 cm (5 ft 7 in)
- Weight: 84.71 kg (186.8 lb)

Sport
- Country: Canada
- Sport: Weightlifting
- Weight class: 85 kg
- Club: Dolbeau-Mitassini
- Team: National team
- Updated on 9 September 2016

Serge Tremblay (born 27 March 1973 in La Malbaie) is a Canadian male weightlifter, competing in the 85 kg category and representing Canada at international competitions. He participated at the 1996 Summer Olympics in the 83 kg event. He competed at world championships, most recently at the 2007 World Weightlifting Championships.

== Major results ==
Year	Venue	Weight	Snatch (kg)				Clean & Jerk (kg)				Total	Rank
Year	Venue	Weight	1	2	3	Rank	1	2	3	Rank	Total	Rank
Summer Olympics
1996	Atlanta, United States	83 kg				—N/a				—N/a		13
World Championships
2007	Chiang Mai, Thailand	85 kg	130	135	~~140~~	40	~~163~~	~~163~~	163	38	298	36
1999	Piraeus, Greece	85 kg	135	~~140~~	~~140~~	50	162.5	~~167.5~~	~~167.5~~	55	297.5	52
