= Gilbert Ojadi Aduche =

Nigerian weightlifter

Aduche Gilbert Ojadi
Personal information
- Nationality: Nigerian
- Born: 29 September 1965 (age 59); Port-Harcourt, Rivers State

Sport
- Sport: Weightlifting

Aduche Gilbert Ojadi (born 29 September 1965) is a Nigerian weightlifter. He competed at the 1988 Summer Olympics and the 1992 Summer Olympics.
