= Keith Caple =

Australian weightlifter (1923–2006)

Personal information
- Nationality: Australian
- Born: 6 May 1923 Sydney, Australia
- Died: 29 November 2006 (aged 83) Auburn, Australia

Sport
- Sport: Weightlifting
Medal record
Men's Weightlifting
Representing Australia
British Empire (and Commonwealth) Games
Bronze medal – third place	1954 Vancouver	Men's Bantamweight

Keith Caple (6 May 1923 – 29 November 2006) was an Australian weightlifter. He competed at the 1948 Summer Olympics and the 1956 Summer Olympics.
