= Gary Shadbolt =

English weightlifter

Personal information
- Nationality: English
Medal record
weightlifting
Representing England
Commonwealth Games
Bronze medal – third place	1978 Edmonton	82.5kg light-heavyweight

Gary Shadbolt (1954-2022) is a former weightlifter who competed for England.

== Weightlifting career ==
Shadbolt represented England and won a bronze medal in the 82.5 kg light-heavyweight division, at the 1978 Commonwealth Games in Edmonton, Alberta, Canada.
