= Roy Jones (bowls) =

Welsh lawn bowler

Personal information
- Nationality: British (Welsh)
- Born: c.1904 Wales

Sport
- Sport: Lawn bowls
- Club: Cwmbran BC

A. Roy Jones (1904 – date of death unknown) was an international lawn bowler from Wales who competed at the Commonwealth Games.

== Biography ==
Jones was a member of the Cwmbran Bowls Club and was runner-up in the rinks at the Welsh National Bowls Championships in 1962.

At the age of 66, Jones represented the Welsh team, at the 1970 British Commonwealth Games in Edinburgh, Scotland. He participated in the fours competition with Harry Thompson, Aeron John and Bill Pattimore, finishing in fifth place.
