= Gerhard Hastik =

Austrian weightlifter

Personal information
- Nationality: Austrian
- Born: 1 June 1939 (age 86)

Sport
- Sport: Weightlifting

Gerhard Hastik (born 1 June 1939) is an Austrian weightlifter. He competed in the men's light heavyweight event at the 1964 Summer Olympics.
