= Tony George (weightlifter) =

New Zealand weightlifter (1919–2006)

Personal information
- Born: Bruce Ronald George; 25 September 1919
- Died: 21 July 2006 (aged 86)

Sport
- Country: New Zealand
- Sport: Weightlifting

Achievements and titles
- National finals: Middleweight champion (1947, 1948, 1949, 1950); Light heavyweight champion (1951, 1952, 1953, 1954, 1955, 1956, 1957, 1958); Middle heavyweight champion (1963)
Medal record
Representing New Zealand
Men's weightlifting
Commonwealth Games
Silver medal – second place	1950 Auckland	Middleweight
Bronze medal – third place	1954 Vancouver	Light heavyweight

Bruce Ronald "Tony" George (25 September 1919 – 21 July 2006) was a New Zealand weightlifter, who won medals for his country at two British Empire Games.

He won the silver medal at the 1950 British Empire Games in the men's middleweight (–75 kg) division. At the 1954 British Empire Games he won the bronze medal in the men's light heavyweight (–82.5 kg) event. George also won 13 national weightlifting championship titles: in the middleweight division in consecutive years from 1947 to 1950; the light heavyweight division every year from 1951 to 1958; and the middle heavyweight division in 1963.

George was the manager of the New Zealand weightlifting team at the 1966 British Empire and Commonwealth Games in Kingston.
