= Lim Hiang Kok =

Singaporean weightlifter (born 1929)

Personal information
- Nationality: Singaporean
- Born: 9 September 1929 Singapore

Sport
- Sport: Weightlifting

Lim Hiang Kok (born 9 September 1929) is a Singaporean weightlifter. He competed in the men's light heavyweight event at the 1964 Summer Olympics.
