= Vicky Batta =

Indian weightlifter (born 1981)

Vicky Batta (born 1981) is an Indian weightlifter. He won the silver medal in the men's 56 kg class at the 2006 Commonwealth Games.

He failed a drug test in 2007. He subsequently failed another drug test in 2009 and received a life ban.
