= Harvey Goodman (weightlifter) =

Australian weightlifter

Personal information
- Full name: Harvey John Goodman
- Nationality: United Kingdom; Australia
- Born: 6 April 1967 (age 59) Bolton, United Kingdom
- Height: 174 cm (5 ft 9 in)
- Weight: 92.51 kg (203.9 lb)

Sport
- Country: Australia
- Sport: Weightlifting
- Weight class: 94 kg
- Club: Phoenix
- Team: National team
Medal record
Commonwealth Games
Bronze medal – third place	1990 Auckland	Men's Middle Heavyweight - Overall
Bronze medal – third place	1990 Auckland	Men's Middle Heavyweight - Clean and Jerk
Bronze medal – third place	1990 Auckland	Men's Middle Heavyweight - Snatch
Gold medal – first place	1994 Victoria BC	Men's Middle Heavyweight - Overall
Gold medal – first place	1994 Victoria BC	Men's Middle Heavyweight - Clean and Jerk
Gold medal – first place	1994 Victoria BC	Men's Middle Heavyweight - Snatch

Harvey John Goodman (born 6 April 1967 in Bolton) is a British-born Australian male weightlifter, competing in the 94 kg category and representing Australia at international competitions. He participated at the 1992 Summer Olympics in the 90 kg event and at the 1996 Summer Olympics in the 91 kg event. He competed at world championships, most recently at the 1999 World Weightlifting Championships.

== Major results ==
Year	Venue	Weight	Snatch (kg)				Clean & Jerk (kg)				Total	Rank
Year	Venue	Weight	1	2	3	Rank	1	2	3	Rank	Total	Rank
Summer Olympics
1996	Atlanta, United States	91 kg				—N/a				—N/a		16
1992	Barcelona, Spain	90 kg				—N/a				—N/a		8
World Championships
1999	Piraeus, Greece	94 kg	150	~~155~~	~~155~~	38	190	~~195~~	~~195~~	27	340	31
