= Gerald Perrin =

British weightlifter

Personal information
- Nationality: British/Jamaican
- Born: 17 November 1946 (age 79) Kingston, Jamaica
- Height: 170 cm (5 ft 7 in)
- Weight: 60 kg (132 lb)

Sport
- Sport: Weightlifting
- Event: Featherweight
- Club: Kentish Town WC, London
Medal record
Weightlifting
Representing England
Commonwealth Games
Gold medal – first place	1970 Edinburgh	-60kg Combined

Gerald Perrin (born 17 November 1946), is a male retired weightlifter who competed for Great Britain at the 1968 Summer Olympics.

== Biography ==
Born in Jamaica, Perrin at the age of nine, moved from Jamaica to the London Borough of Camden. He joined the Kentish Town Weightlifting Club in London.

In 1967 he won the senior British featherweight title and at the 1968 Olympic Games in Mexico City, Perrin participated in the men's 60 kg featherweight division.

Perrin represented England in the -60 kg featherweight category, at the 1970 British Commonwealth Games in Edinburgh, Scotland, winning a gold medal.
