= Cheng Cheng-chung =

Taiwanese weightlifter

Personal information
- Native name: 鄭正忠
- Nationality: Taiwanese
- Born: 9 July 1936 (age 88)

Sport
- Sport: Weightlifting

Cheng Cheng-chung (traditional Chinese: 鄭正忠; simplified Chinese: 郑正忠; born 9 July 1936) is a Taiwanese weightlifter. He competed in the men's light heavyweight event at the 1964 Summer Olympics.

== Biography ==
Cheng is from the Gangshan District of Taiwan's Kaohsiung. He graduated from a national school. Cheng was the owner of a watch shop in Gangshan in 1960. In 1959, he served in Taiwan's military. At Taiwan's Provincial Games (Chinese: 省運比賽) in 1958, he represented Tainan and won in the middleweight weightlifting category. Cheng competed in the middleweight category at the 3rd Provincial Weightlifting Championship (Chinese: 全省舉重錦標賽) in 1959. He did a bench press of 98 kg (215 lb), a snatch of 98 kg (215 lb), and a clean and jerk of 120 kg (270 lb). In total, he lifted 320 kg (700 lb) and placed second in his weight category. He competed in an international weightlifting competition in Manila on 27 May 1960 and placed second in the middleweight category. On 27 October 1960, Cheng represented Tainan in Taiwan's Provincial Games (Chinese: 省運比賽) in the light heavyweight division. In the snatch event, he lifted 100 kg (230 lb). In the bench press event, he lifted 110 kg (250 lb), which broke a competition record. He lifted 150 kg (320 lb) in the clean and jerk, which set a national record. In total, he lifted 365 kg (805 lb) which set a national record and earned him first place.

Representing the Air Force, Cheng was a corporal when competed at the National Military Games (Chinese: 國軍運動會) on 22 December 1960. He lifted a total of 370 kg (810 lb), which smashed the national record. Chang competed in the Taiwan-Hong Kong-Philippines Triangle Weightlifting Competition (Chinese: 台港菲三角舉重賽) in May 1961 in the light heavyweight division, where he won the competition and set a competition record by lifting a total of 370 kg (820 lb). At the April 1962 Asian Games Weightlifting Trials at the Kaohsiung Gymnasium (Chinese: 高雄體育館), Cheng in three lifts lifted 401 kg (885 lb). This broke the Asian Games record and qualified him for the Asian Games.

Cheng competed in the men's light heavyweight event at the 1964 Summer Olympics. After he placed last in Group A, the Central News Agency said he underperformed relative to expectations. He did a military press of 115 kg (254 lb), a snatch of 120 kg (260 lb), and a clean and jerk of 150 kg (330 lb). The total weight he lifted was 385 kg (849 lb) which was below his top weight of 401 kg (885 lb) at home.
