= Gary Cleveland =

American weightlifter (1942–2004)

Personal information
- Born: January 18, 1942 Hastings, Nebraska, United States
- Died: January 4, 2004 (aged 61) Robbinsdale, Minnesota, United States

Sport
- Sport: Weightlifting

Gary Cleveland (January 18, 1942 – January 4, 2004) was an American weightlifter. He competed in the men's light heavyweight event at the 1964 Summer Olympics.
