= Jim Ferguson (weightlifter) =

British weightlifter

Personal information
- Born: 1938 Perthshire, Scotland

Sport
- Sport: Weightlifting
- Event: Heavyweight
- Club: Al Murray's, London

James "Jim" Telford Ferguson (born 1938) is a former weightlifter from Scotland, who represented Scotland at the British Empire and Commonwealth Games (now Commonwealth Games).

== Biography ==
Ferguson, born in Perthshire, moved to Coatbridge at the age of five. He set numerous Highland games throwing records. In 1960, he moved to London and trained at Al Murray's gym.

Ferguson represented the Scotland team at the 1966 British Empire and Commonwealth Games in Kingston, Jamaica, where he participated in 110 kg heavyweight category.

In 1993, he won a silver medal at the over-35s World Weightlifting Championships and at the time ran his own exercise equipment supply business. Later he became the manager of the Scottish weightlifting team but was forced to resign in 2002 following allegations of helping competitors to buy performance-enhancing drugs.

In 2018 he was named in the IMWA Hall of Fame.
