= Harry Thompson (bowls) =

Welsh lawn bowler

Personal information
- Nationality: British (Welsh)
- Born: c.1909 Wales

Sport
- Sport: Lawn bowls
- Club: Cwmbran BC

C. Harry Thompson (c.1909 – date of death unknown) was an international lawn bowler from Wales who competed at the Commonwealth Games.

== Biography ==
At the age of 61, Thompson represented the Welsh team, at the 1970 British Commonwealth Games in Edinburgh, Scotland. He participated in the fours competition with Bill Pattimore, Roy Jones and Aeron John, finishing in fifth place.

Thompson was a member of the Cwmbran Bowls Club and in 1975, he skipped the Cwmbran rink when runner-up in the Monmouthshire County championships.
