= Ib Bergmann =

Danish weightlifter

Personal information
- Nationality: Danish
- Born: 16 May 1949 (age 75); Copenhagen, Denmark

Sport
- Sport: Weightlifting

Ib Bergmann (born 16 May 1949) is a Danish weightlifter. He competed in the men's light heavyweight event at the 1972 Summer Olympics.
