= Alexandra Platzer =

Austrian politician (born 1986)

Member of the Landtag of Upper Austria
- Incumbent
- Assumed office 25 January 2024

Member of the Federal Council
- In office 23 October 2021 – 24 January 2024
- Succeeded by: Bernhard Ruf
- Constituency: Upper Austria

Personal details
- Born: 23 February 1986 (age 40)
- Party: People's Party

Alexandra Platzer (born 23 February 1986) is an Austrian politician of the People's Party. She has been a member of the Landtag of Upper Austria since 2024, and was a member of the Federal Council from 2021 to 2024.
