= Yves Carignan =

Canadian weightlifter (born 1952)

Personal information
- Born: 7 September 1952 (age 74) Arthabaska, Quebec, Canada

Sport
- Sport: Weightlifting

Yves Carignan (born 7 September 1952) is a Canadian weightlifter. He competed in the men's bantamweight event at the 1976 Summer Olympics.
