= Chua Phung Kim =

Singaporean weightlifter (1939–1990)

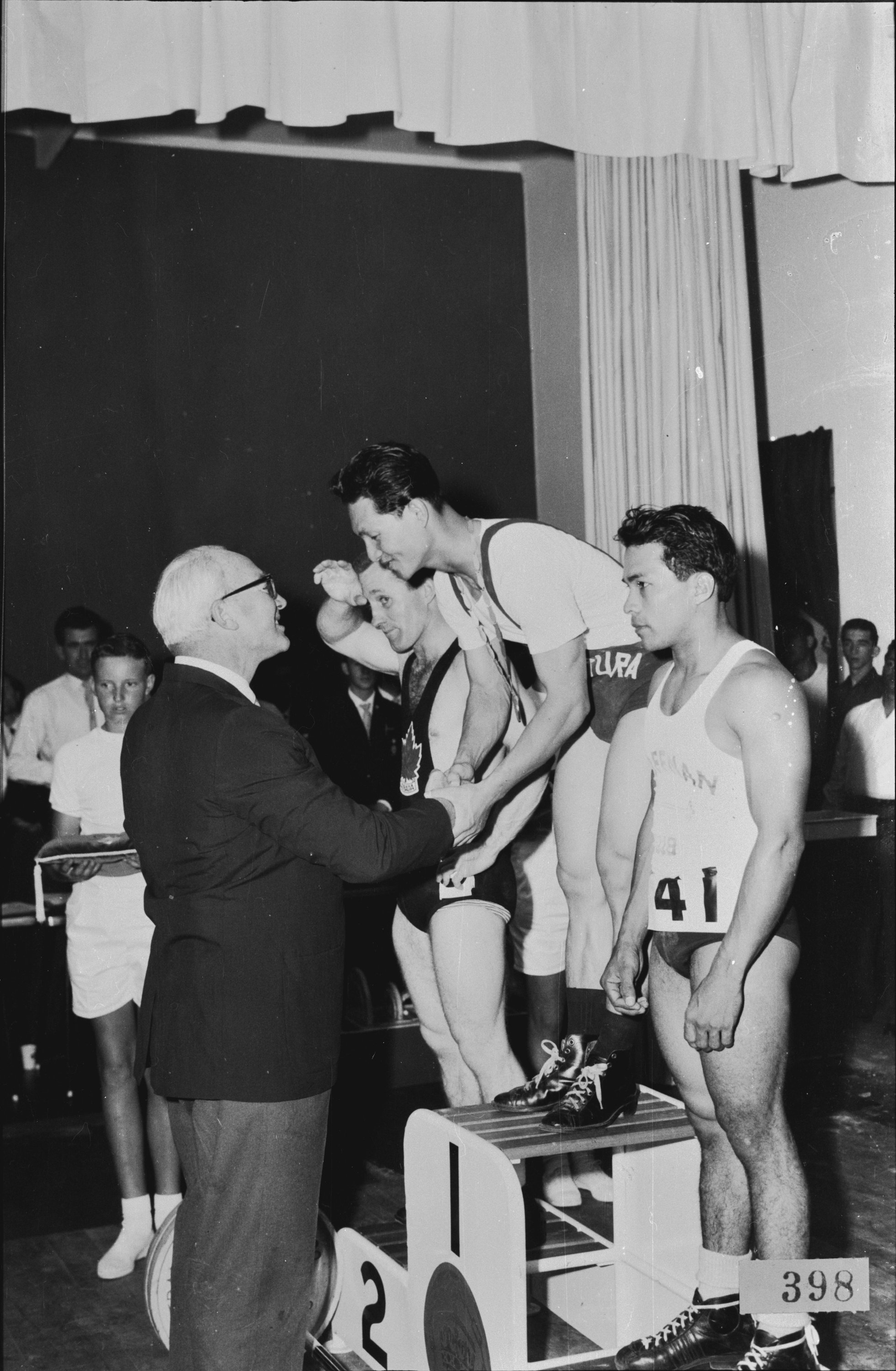
- 1962 Commonwealth Game, Perth

Personal information
- Born: 29 April 1939 Singapore, Straits Settlement
- Died: 4 August 1990 (aged 51) Singapore

Sport
- Country: Singapore; Malaysia (16 September 1963 - 8 August 1965)
- Sport: Weightlifting
Medal record
Weightlifting
Representing Singapore
Commonwealth Games
Gold medal – first place	1962 Perth	Bantamweight
Silver medal – second place	1970 Edinburgh	Featherweight
Asian Games
Silver medal – second place	1966 Bangkok	Bantamweight
Southeast Asian Games
Gold medal – first place	1965 Kuala Lumpur	Bantamweight
Silver medal – second place	1961 Rangoon	Bantamweight

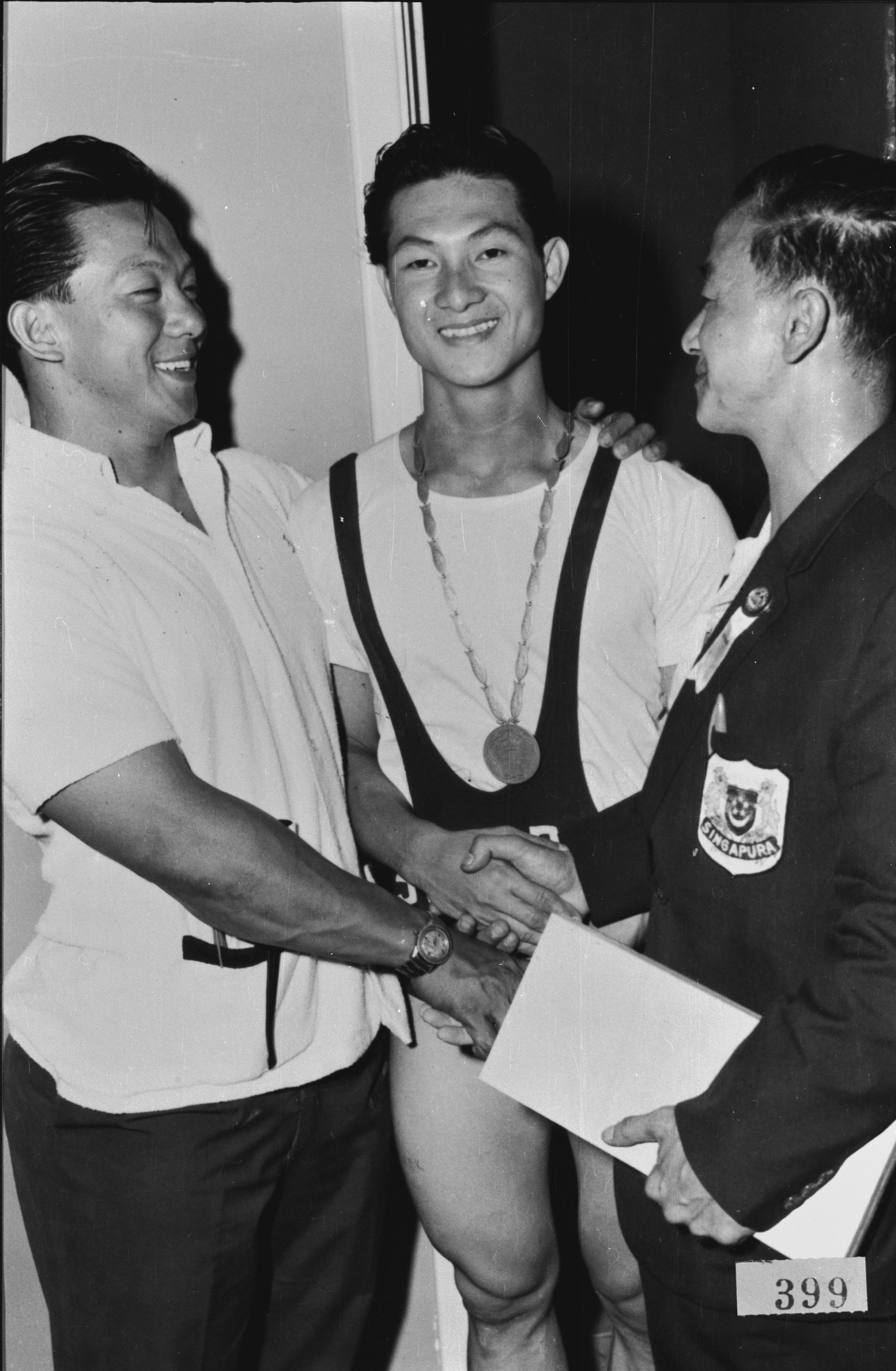
Gold Medal in 1962 Commonwealth Game, Perth

Chua Phung Kim (Chinese: 蔡攀錦; pinyin: Cài Pānjǐn; 29 April 1939 – 4 August 1990) was a Singaporean weightlifter. He was a gold medalist in weightlifting in the 1962 British Empire and Commonwealth Games.

== Weightlifting career ==
Chua first took to the sport in 1960 after being introduced to it by his elder brother, Chua Peng Kim.

Chua won the silver medal at the 1961 Southeast Asian Peninsular Games (SEAP Games).

Just two years later, he helped Singapore win another gold medal in the Commonwealth Games by coming in tops in the bantamweight category during the 1962 British Empire and Commonwealth Games held in Perth, Western Australia after lifting a total of 710 lbs, a Commonwealth Games record. He also broke the individual records for the press (215 lbs), snatch (225 lbs) and jerk (270 lbs).

He represented Malaysia at the 1964 Summer Olympics in Tokyo when Singapore was part of Malaysia, but only managed the sixth position.

In 1965, Chua also took the gold medal in the 4th SEAP Games held in Kuala Lumpur, Malaysia.

Chua won the silver medal in the bantamweight category at the 1966 Asian Games in Bangkok, Thailand.

Chua was awarded a Certificate of merit during the inaugural Singapore Sports Awards in 1968.

In 1966, Chua took part in the 1966 British Empire and Commonwealth Games in the bantamweight category. He failed all his lifts and did not register a total.

During the 1970 British Commonwealth Games, Chua won the silver medal in the Featherweight category, losing out on the gold medal by 2.5 kilograms.

In March 1971, Chua retired from competitive participation in the sport. In 1976, he contributed to the sport as a coach under the Singapore Amateur Weightlifting Federation.

== Personal life ==
Chua worked as an auto mechanic and later as a mechanical supervisor with the Singapore Refining Company. He died in 1990 after a long sickness.
