= George Vakakis =

Australian weightlifter (born 1943)

Personal information
- Nationality: Australian
- Born: 9 November 1943 (age 82) China

Sport
- Sport: Weightlifting
Medal record
British Empire Games
Gold medal – first place	1966 Perth	Men's Light Heavyweight

George Vakakis (born 9 November 1943) is an Australian weightlifter. He competed in the men's light heavyweight event at the 1964 Summer Olympics.
