= Rei Berroa =

American poet

Rei Berroa (born in Gurabo, Dominican Republic, 1949) is a Dominican-American poet, university professor, literary and cultural critic, and translator living in the United States. He has published more than 25 books of poetry, anthologies, translations, and literary criticism.

== Biography ==
In 1983 he received a Ph.D. from the University of Pittsburgh, and since 1984 has taught Spanish literature and literary criticism at George Mason University in Fairfax, Virginia.

For more than 25 years, he has devoted his poetry, writing, performances, music, teaching, and service in his academic, social, and political community to engagement in a venture he calls "cultural facilitation" or "cultural agency." This approach has recently been described as a “cultural agent of growth and change through the experience of the arts,” seeking to “increase the impact of creative and scholarly practices by identifying artists, educators, and community leaders who have developed socially productive artistic practices, by reflecting the role of art in building a civil society, and by disseminating best practices through workshops and public forums.”

He was Faculty Advisor to the GMU journal Hispanic Culture Review (1992–2006), for which he received the GMU Advisor of the Year Award in 2002. He has been literary advisor to Arlington's Teatro de la Luna since its founding in 1991 and since 2001 has coordinated its annual Poetry Marathon at Casa de la Luna, the Library of Congress in Washington, D.C., and other venues. Through this festival he has brought together poets from all over the Spanish speaking world, and has published the festival poetry anthologies since 2001. His advice and participation as poet, scholar and teacher has been sought by organizers of poetry festivals and international book fairs in Villahermosa (Mexico), Izmir (Turkey), Santo Domingo (Dominican Republic), Caracas (Venezuela), and Recife (Brasil), among other places.

He has also produced an opus of cultural and literary scholarship. In the field of contemporary literature, he has placed particular attention on Spanish poet Miguel Hernández and the literature of the Caribbean, with emphasis on the Dominican Republic. His book Ideología y retórica: Las prosas de guerra de Miguel Hernández is a semiotic approach to the art of propaganda as high art, and offered the first serious study on the use of rhetoric during armed conflicts to convey ideologies. Professor Tracy K. Lewis (CUNY, Oswego) called it “a meditation on the nature of the Word as persuasion … and as such it offers an innovative application of semiotic principles to the problems of propagandistic literature, an impressive mustering of the resources of traditional rhetorical study, references to the most reliable and veritable constellation of modern scholars, and the postulation of a number of new principles, extremely useful, all of them, for analyzing literature in its social context.”

He has lectured at universities in the United States, Latin America, and Spain, and has published papers in numerous university journals. His poems have appeared in literary journals in many parts of the world. His book of poetry Libro de los fragmentos y otros poemas, published in Caracas in 2007, sold out the same day it was made available to the public. His long poem “De adinamia de mente de umnesia” about the Alzheimer's disease received an award in Murcia, Spain, in 2008 and in February 2010 became a book published in Villahermosa, Mexico.

He is writing a book about García Lorca's visit to New York in 1929–1930, and is preparing several books and anthologies for the Venezuelan publishing houses El Perro y la Rana and Monte Ávila, and for other publishers in Spain, Mexico, and the Dominican Republic. These books include one of Caribbean poets living in the U.S.; one of contemporary Dominican poets; a study on the poetics of motherhood; a translation of American poet John Curl’s poetry; and a study of Spanish poet Miguel Hernández.

He has participated in numerous international poetry festivals in Mexico (Mexico City and Tabasco), Cuba, Brasil (Fliporto), Spain, El Salvador, the Dominican Republic, Turkey (Izmir), the Festival Mundial de Poesía in Caracas, Venezuela, and the International Poetry Festival of Medellín, Colombia. Some of his poems have also been translated into English, Romanian, Belarusian, French, Italian, Portuguese, Russian, and Turkish. In May 2009, he received a “Médaille de Vermeil” from the Academy of Arts, Sciences, and Letters of Paris in recognition for his poetic work.

== Bibliography ==
- Eufemistica per vivere tranquilli, trad. Gaetano Longo e Daria Potok, Trieste, FrancoPuzzoEditore, 2011, ISBN 978-88-88475-42-4. Premio Internazionale Trieste Poesia 2011
- Otridades. (Zamora, Spain, 2010)
- Libro de los dones y los bienes. (Caracas, Venezuela, 2010)
- De adinamia de mente de umnesia. (Villahermosa, Mexico, 2010)
- Jerarquías. (CD) (Villahermosa, Mexico, 2009)
- Aproximaciones a la literatura dominicana. Vol. I [1930-1980] (Santo Domingo, 2007) and Vol. II [1981-2008] (Santo Domingo, 2008)
- Libro de los fragmentos y otros poemas. (Caracas, Venezuela, 2007) (under revision to appear in the US as Book of Fragments and Other Poems)
- Book of Fragments. (Calcutta, India 1993)
- Ideología y retórica: Las prosas de guerra de Miguel Hernández. (México, 1988)
- Libro de los fragmentos. (Buenos Aires, 1988)
- Literature of the Americas. Two Vols. [Co-authored] (Dubuque, Iowa, 1986)
- Los otros. (Santo Domingo, 1981)
- Retazos para un traje de tierra. (Madrid, 1979)
