= Jože Urankar =

Slovenian weightlifter (1939–2021)

Personal information
- Nationality: Slovenian
- Born: 28 October 1939 Celje, Yugoslavia
- Died: 26 November 2021 (aged 82) Celje, Slovenia

Sport
- Sport: Weightlifting

Jože Urankar (28 October 1939 – 26 November 2021) was a Slovenian weightlifter. He competed in the men's light heavyweight event at the 1972 Summer Olympics. Urankar died in November 2021, at the age of 82.
