= Martín Eguiguren =

Argentine weightlifter

Personal information
- Nationality: Argentine
- Born: 15 January 1941 (age 84)

Sport
- Sport: Weightlifting

Martín Eguiguren (born 15 January 1941) is an Argentine weightlifter. He competed in the men's light heavyweight event at the 1964 Summer Olympics.
