= Tung Chye Hong =

Singaporean weightlifter

Personal information
- Nationality: Singaporean
- Born: 6 February 1945 (age 80)

Sport
- Sport: Weightlifting

Tung Chye Hong (born 6 February 1945) is a Singaporean weightlifter. He competed in the men's bantamweight event at the 1968 Summer Olympics.
