= Yvan Darsigny =

Canadian weightlifter

Personal information
- Born: 2 March 1966 (age 60) Saint-Hyacinthe, Quebec, Canada

Sport
- Sport: Weightlifting

Yvan Darsigny (born 2 March 1966) is a Canadian former weightlifter. He competed at the 1984 Summer Olympics and the 1992 Summer Olympics.

His daughter, Tali Darsigny and his son Shad Darsigny are also international weightlifters.
