= George Newton (weightlifter) =

English weightlifter

Personal information
- Nationality: British Guiana; England; New Zealand
- Born: 13 August 1936 British Guiana
- Died: 23 February 2016 (aged 79) Christchurch, New Zealand
Medal record
Men's weightlifting
Representing England
British Empire & Commonwealth Games
Gold medal – first place	1962 Perth	-60 Kg combined
Silver medal – second place	1966 Kingston	-67.5 Kg combined
Gold medal – first place	1970 Edinburgh	-67.5 Kg combined
Gold medal – first place	1974 Christchurch	-67.5 Kg combined

George Newton (13 August 1936 – 23 February 2016) was a male weightlifter who competed for England and Great Britain, and then for New Zealand at the end of his career.

== Weightlifting career ==
He represented England and won a gold medal in 60 kg, at the 1962 British Empire and Commonwealth Games in Perth, Western Australia.

Four years later he stepped up in weight to the -67.5 kg category and went on to win a silver medal and two consecutive gold medals, at the 1966 British Empire and Commonwealth Games in Kingston, Jamaica, the 1970 British Commonwealth Games in Edinburgh, Scotland and the 1974 British Commonwealth Games in Christchurch, New Zealand.

He trained out of the Bethnal Green Weightlifting Club and represented Great Britain at the 1964 Summer Olympics and the 1972 Summer Olympics.

After his fourth Commonwealth Games appearance he remained in New Zealand and represented them in the 1978 Commonwealth Games at the age of 42.

== Personal life ==
He was an electrician by trade.
