= Emilio Berroa =

Dominican Republic weightlifter (1946–2023)

Personal information
- Full name: Luis Emilio Berroa
- Nationality: Dominican
- Born: 3 October 1946; San Pedro de Macorís, Dominican Republic
- Died: 19 April 2023 (aged 76); Elk River, Minnesota, United States

Sport
- Sport: Weightlifting

Luis Emilio Berroa (3 October 1946 – 19 April 2023) was a Dominican Republic weightlifter. He competed in the men's light heavyweight event at the 1972 Summer Olympics.
