= José Manuel Eguiguren Urrejola =

Chilean politician and lawyer

Member of Parliament, Republic of Chile
- In office 1855–1861
- Preceded by: Waldo Silva Algüe
- Succeeded by: Antonio Concha
- Constituency: Curicó, Santa Cruz and Vichuquén

Personal details
- Born: 1811 Cauquenes, Kingdom of Chile
- Died: 1883 (aged 71–72) Santiago de Chile, Chile
- Party: Chilean Conservative Party
- Spouse: María Concepción Gaete Ruiz
- Occupation: Lawyer

José Manuel Eguiguren Urrejola (1811–1883) was a Chilean politician and lawyer. He was born in Cauquenes in 1811 and died in Santiago in 1883. He was the son of Don José Manuel de Eguiguren Uriarte and Doña María Josefa Urrejola de Lecler y Vicourt. He married María Concepción Gaete Ruiz.

== Education ==
Urrejola attended the local school in Cauquenes and later emigrated to Santiago, where he studied law at the National Institute, graduating as a lawyer in 1843.

== Legal career ==
Urrejola worked as a lawyer for the Municipality of Santiago from 1845. He next served as collector of Customs in Valparaíso from 1848 and then later was appointed Judge in Cauquenes from 1850.

== Political career ==
Urrejola was a Conservative Party activist and thus was elected Member of Parliament for Curicó and Santa Cruz in 1855. He was re-elected to the same departments in 1858. During this period he joined the Standing Committee on Constitution, Law and Justice.

In 1862 he was appointed Minister of the Court of Appeals of Santiago and then Minister of the Supreme Court of Justice in 1867. Later he retired from public life and took over the running of his family ranch.
