= Basilios Stellios =

Australian weightlifter (born 1959)

Bill Stellios
Personal information
- Full name: Basilios Stellios
- Nationality: Australian
- Born: 16 April 1959 (age 67)

Sport
- Sport: Weightlifting
Medal record
Men's Weightlifting
Commonwealth Games
Gold medal – first place	1978 Edmonton	Lightweight
Silver medal – second place	1982 Brisbane	Lightweight
Gold medal – first place	1986 Edinburgh	Middleweight

Basilios "Bill" Stellios (born 16 April 1959) is an Australian former weightlifter. He competed at the 1980 Summer Olympics and the 1984 Summer Olympics.
