= Reinhold Platzer =

Austrian weightlifter

Personal information
- Nationality: Austrian
- Born: 5 January 1939 (age 86)

Sport
- Sport: Weightlifting

Reinhold Platzer (born 5 January 1939) is an Austrian weightlifter. He competed in the men's light heavyweight event at the 1972 Summer Olympics.
