= Olivia Baker (weightlifter) =

New Zealand weightlifter

Personal information
- Born: 28 February 1979 (age 47) Upper Hutt, New Zealand
- Height: 1.6 m (5 ft 3 in)
- Weight: 100 kg (220 lb)

Sport
- Country: New Zealand
- Sport: Weightlifting
Medal record
Commonwealth Games
Silver medal – second place	2002 Manchester	75+ kg Snatch
Bronze medal – third place	2002 Manchester	75+ kg Clean and jerk
Bronze medal – third place	2002 Manchester	75+ kg Total

Olivia Eileen Baker (born 28 February 1979 in Upper Hutt, New Zealand) is a former weightlifting competitor for New Zealand who competed in the 2000 Summer Olympics.

Baker was the first female weightlifter from New Zealand to compete at the Olympics.

At the 2002 Commonwealth Games in Manchester she won a silver medal in the 75+ kg snatch, and two bronze medals in the 75+ kg clean and jerk and combined total.
