= Carlton Goring =

English weightlifter

Personal information
- Nationality: British Guianan
- Born: 5 February 1932 British Guiana
- Died: 26 October 2022 (aged 90) Port Saint Lucie, Florida, USA

Sport
- Sport: Weightlifting
- Event: Lightweight
Medal record
weightlifting
Representing England
British Empire & Commonwealth Games
Gold medal – first place	1962 Perth	-67.5 Kg combined

Carlton Michael Goring (5 February 1932 – 26 October 2022) was an international weightlifter who competed for British Guiana and England.

== Biography ==
Goring was from British Guiana and represented his nation at the 1958 British Empire and Commonwealth Games in Cardiff, Wales.

Four years later he represented the England team at the 1962 British Empire and Commonwealth Games in Perth, Australia. He competed in the 67.5 kg lightweight event, winning a gold medal.

He was a post office sorter by trade and lived in Tooting in South London. He died in 2022 at the age of 90 in Florida, USA.
