= George Manners (weightlifter) =

English weightlifter (1938–2021)

Personal information
- Nationality: British/Vincentian
- Born: 25 January 1938 Saint Vincent and the Grenadines
- Died: August 2021 (aged 83) England
- Occupation: Weightlifting coach

Sport
- Sport: Olympic weightlifting
- Event: Light Heavyweight
Medal record
weightlifting
Representing England
British Empire & Commonwealth Games
Silver medal – second place	1962 Perth	-82.5 Kg combined
Silver medal – second place	1966 Kingston	-90 Kg combined
Bronze medal – third place	1970 Edinburgh	-90 Kg combined

George Russell Manners (25 January 1938 – August 2021) was a British/Vincentian male weightlifter who competed for England.

== Weightlifting career ==
Manners represented Great Britain at the 1964 Summer Olympics finishing in 15th place in the light-heavyweight category.

He represented England and finished fifth in the -60 kg combined category at the 1958 British Empire and Commonwealth Games in Cardiff, Wales. He won two silver medals at the 1962 British Empire and Commonwealth Games and the 1966 British Empire and Commonwealth Games respectively.

== Personal life ==
He migrated to England in 1957 and was a plumber by trade. He died in August 2021 at the age of 83.
