= Brian Saunders (weightlifter) =

English weightlifter

Personal information
- Nationality: British (English)
- Born: c.1944 Reading, England
- Height: 188 cm (6 ft 2 in)
- Weight: 133 kg (293 lb)

Sport
- Sport: Weightlifting
- Event: Heavyweight / Super Heavyweight
- Club: Reading YMCA

Brian Saunders (born c.1944) is a male former weightlifter who competed for England at the Commonwealth Games.

== Biography ==
Saunders was the last person to be both the British Amateur Weight Lifters' Association (BAWLA) weightlifting champion and BAWLA powerlifting champion; the latter of which he won in 1970 and 1974.

He represented the England team in the +110 kg super heavyweight category, at the 1970 British Commonwealth Games in Edinburgh, Scotland.

In May 1971, he won the British super-heavyweight title. He was a computer operator and was living at Mays Lane in Earley at the time.
