= Shad Darsigny =

Canadian weightlifter (born 2003)

Personal information
- Born: 20 April 2003 (age 23)

Sport
- Country: Canada
- Sport: Weightlifting
Medal record
Weightlifting
Representing Canada
Commonwealth Games
Bronze medal – third place	2022 Birmingham	73 kg

Shad Darsigny (born 20 April 2003) is a Canadian weightlifter. He competed in the weightlifting competition at the 2022 Commonwealth Games, winning a bronze medal in the men's 73 kg event.

Darsigny had previously competed at the 2021 and 2022 Junior World Weightlifting Championships, winning a bronze medal in the men's 73 kilogram class. His father Yvan Darsigny, a former Olympic weightlifter, was the team coach. His sister Tali Darsigny is also a medal-winning international weightlifter.
