= Sylvanus Blackman =

British weightlifter (1933–2021)

Personal information
- Nationality: Barbados; England
- Born: 1 July 1933 Bridgetown, Barbados
- Died: 23 January 2021 (aged 87)
Medal record
weightlifting
Representing Barbados
British Empire & Commonwealth Games
Silver medal – second place	1958 Cardiff	-82.5 Kg combined
Representing England
British Empire & Commonwealth Games
Silver medal – second place	1966 Kingston	-82.5 Kg combined

Sylvanus Timotheus Blackman (1 July 1933 – 23 January 2021) was a male weightlifter who competed for Barbados, England and Great Britain.

== Weightlifting career ==
He competed at three Olympic Games in 1960, 1964 and 1968. He represented his country of birth, (Barbados) and won a silver medal in 82.5 kg, at the 1958 British Empire and Commonwealth Games in Cardiff, Wales. Eight years later he represented England and won another silver medal in 82.5 kg, at the 1966 British Empire and Commonwealth Games in Kingston, Jamaica.
