= Adrian Kebbe =

Australian weightlifter

Medal record

Men's weightlifting

Representing Australia

Commonwealth Games
Silver medal – second place	1978 Edmonton	Lightweight

Adrian Kebbe (born 11 August 1958) is a retired Australian weightlifter and Presbyterian Minister.

Kebbe won a silver medal at the 1978 Commonwealth Games in Edmonton, Canada. Competing in the Lightweight – Overall category, he lifted 267.5 kg. As of 2018, Australia leads in all-time weightlifting medals at the Commonwealth Games, with Kebbe contributing to the 52 silver medals that the nation has won since the sport was added to the games in 1950.

The following year at the 1979 World Weightlifting Championships in Thessaloniki, Greece, Kebbe lifted 117.5 kg in the snatch and 147.5 kg in the clean and jerk, but placed 15th and did not medal. (The gold medal in Kebbe's class at that competition went to Bulgarian Yanko Rusev, who set a then world record with a total of 332.5 kg.)

Since retiring from weightlifting, Kebbe has written a book titled The world's best kept secret: the ultimate search for significance and meaning (Viva Press, 1997; ISBN 0-646-32552-3) and has worked as a magician, performing professionally as comedy magician 'Harry Houdidn't'. He is currently the pastor of Templestowe Presbyterian Church in Victoria.
