= Jeffrey Bryce =

British weightlifter (born 1948)

Personal information
- Nationality: British
- Born: 28 April 1948 (age 78)

Sport
- Sport: Weightlifting

Jeffrey Bryce (born 28 April 1948) is a British former weightlifter. He competed in the men's featherweight event at the 1980 Summer Olympics.
