= Allen Salter =

Canadian weightlifter

Personal information
- Born: 11 October 1936 Almonte, Ontario, Canada
- Died: 13 January 2011 (aged 74) Arnprior, Ontario, Canada

Sport
- Sport: Weightlifting

Allen Salter (11 October 1936 – 13 January 2011) was a Canadian weightlifter. He competed in the men's featherweight event at the 1964 Summer Olympics. Salter was named as Ottawa's athlete of the year in 1962.

In 1960, Salter attended the Canadian Weightlifting Championships in Québec City. There, he won his first of eight consecutive national titles. In 1994, he became a member of the Smiths Falls Sports Hall of Fame, located in Ontario, Canada.
