= Paul Ross (weightlifter) =

Northern Irish weightlifter

Personal information
- Nationality: British (Northern Irish)
- Born: c.1943 Northern Ireland

Sport
- Sport: Weightlifting
- Events: Lightweight, Featherweight
- Club: Baxter's Physical Culture Studio

Paul Ross (born c.1943) is a former weightlifter from Northern Ireland, who represented Northern Ireland at three Commonwealth Games.

== Biography ==
Ross was a member of the Baxter's Physical Culture Studio in Donegan Sheet, Belfast.

Ross represented the 1966 Northern Irish Team at the 1966 British Empire and Commonwealth Games in Kingston, Jamaica, participating in the 67.5kg lightweight category.

Ross, a motor mechanic by profession, went to his second Commonwealth Games in 1970, as part of the 1970 Northern Irish Team in Edinburgh, Scotland.

Ross won the Irish national title in 1970 and 1973, and competed in his third Games at the 1974 British Commonwealth Games.
