= Ieuan Owen =

British weightlifter (born 1941)

Personal information
- Nationality: British (Welsh)
- Born: 12 February 1941 (age 85) Caernarfon, Wales
- Height: 166 cm (5 ft 5 in)
- Weight: 67 kg (148 lb)

Sport
- Sport: Weightlifting
- Event: Featherweight / Lightweight
- Club: Llanrug Amateur Weightlifting Club
Medal record
Representing Wales
Commonwealth Games
Bronze medal – third place	1966 Kingston	67.5kg lightweight
Silver medal – second place	1970 Edinburgh	-67.5kg lightweight
Silver medal – second place	1974 Christchurch	-67.5kg lightweight

Ieuan Wyn Owen (born 12 February 1941) is a former weightlifter from Wales who competed at the 1972 Summer Olympics and four Commonwealth Games..

== Biography ==
Owen was a member of the Llanrug Amateur Weightlifting Club and represented the 1962 Welsh team at the 1962 British Empire and Commonwealth Games in Perth, Australia, where he participated in the 60kg featherweight category.

Four years later in 1966, he went to his second Commonwealth Games in Kingston, Jamaica, competing for the 1966 Welsh team in the 67.5kg lightweight category and won a silver medal.

At the 1972 Olympic Games in Munich, Owen competed in the men's lightweight event.
