= Mike Pearman =

British weightlifter

Personal information
- Nationality: British (English)
- Born: 22 May 1941 (age 85) London, England
- Height: 170 cm (5 ft 7 in)
- Weight: 82 kg (181 lb)

Sport
- Sport: Weightlifting
- Event: Light-heavyweight
- Club: Kentish Town
Medal record
weightlifting
Representing England
British Empire & Commonwealth Games
Bronze medal – third place	1966 Kingston	-82.5 Kg combined
Bronze medal – third place	1974 Edinburgh	-82.5 Kg combined

Michael Pearman (born 22 May 1941), is a male retired weightlifter who competed for England and Great Britain.

== Weightlifting career ==
He competed at three Olympic Games in 1964, 1968 and 1972.

He represented England and won a bronze medal in 82.5 kg division, at the 1966 British Empire and Commonwealth Games in Kingston, Jamaica,

Four years later he represented England, at the 1970 British Commonwealth Games in Edinburgh, Scotland and won a second Commonwealth medal eight years after his first, when he won another bronze medal at the 1974 British Commonwealth Games in Christchurch, New Zealand.
