= Horace Johnson (weightlifter) =

British weightlifter (born 19)

Personal information
- Nationality: British (Welsh)
- Born: 13 June 1942 St Asaph, Wales
- Died: 20 April 2017 Prestatyn, Wales

Sport
- Sport: Weightlifting
- Event: Middleweight
- Club: Rhyl Barbell Weightlifting Club
Medal record
Representing Wales
Commonwealth Games
Bronze medal – third place	1962 Perth	75kg middleweight
Silver medal – second place	1966 Kingston	75kg middleweight

Horace Andrew Johnson (13 June 1942 – 20 April 2017) was a weightlifter from Wales who medals at two Commonwealth Games.

== Biography ==
Johnson was a member of the Rhyl Barbell Weightlifting Club.

He represented the 1962 Welsh team at the 1962 British Empire and Commonwealth Games in Perth, Australia, where he participated in the 75kg middleweight category, and won a bronze medal. At the time of the Games, he was a welder for Messrs. Gibbs and was living in Marion Road, Prestatyn.

Four years later in 1966, he went to his second Commonwealth Games in Kingston, Jamaica, competing for the 1966 Welsh team in the 75kg middleweight category and won another medal but this time went one better by winning silver.
