= Tony Ford (weightlifter) =

British weightlifter

Personal information
- Nationality: English
- Born: 19 May 1938 (age 88)
Medal record
weightlifting
Representing England
Commonwealth Games
Gold medal – first place	1974 Christchurch	Light Heavyweight 82.5kg

Michael Anthony ("Tony") Ford (born 19 May 1938 ) is a male former English weightlifter.

== Weightlifting career ==
Ford represented Great Britain at the 1972 Summer Olympics in the light heavyweight, placing 13th.

He represented England and won a gold medal in the light heavyweight 82.5 kg class, at the 1974 British Commonwealth Games in Christchurch, New Zealand.

He also represented England/Great Britain in 42 international matches. Ford achieved all this after a serious road accident when he was 13 years of age that did damage to his right arm and leg. Ford was the fitness coach at Hereford United F.C. for several years, specialising in weight training but joined Shrewsbury Town in June 2010 after Graham Turner was appointed manager. Ford became one of Britain's best weightlifters at middle and light heavyweight breaking the longest ever record that was Jim Haliday's snatch record of 260 lbs which stood for twenty one years, Ford snatched 264 lbs.
