= Alan Oshyer =

Australian weightlifter (1939–2002)

Personal information
- Nationality: Australian
- Born: 26 July 1939 Charters Towers, Queensland, Australia
- Died: June 2002

Sport
- Sport: Weightlifting
Medal record
British Empire Games
Silver medal – second place	1962 Perth	Men's Lightweight

Alan John Oshyer (26 July 1939 – June 2002) was an Australian weightlifter. He competed in the men's featherweight event at the 1960 Summer Olympics.
