= Gerald Hay =

Australian weightlifter

Personal information
- Nationality: Australian
- Born: 9 October 1946 Edinburgh, Scotland
- Died: 23 February 2026 (aged 79) Adamstown, New South Wales, Australia

Sport
- Sport: Weightlifting
Medal record
CommonwealthGames
| Silver medal – second place | 1974 Christchurch | Men's Featherweight |

Gerald Hay (9 October 1946 – 23 February 2026) was a former Australian weightlifter. He competed for Australia at the 1964 Summer Olympics.
