= Nick Ciancio =

Australian weightlifter (1947–2026)

Personal information
- Nationality: Australian
- Born: 21 February 1947 Militello in Val di Catania, Italy
- Died: 7 March 2026 (aged 79) Melbourne, Victoria, Australia

Sport
- Sport: Weightlifting
Medal record
CommonwealthGames
| Gold medal – first place | 1970 Edinburgh | Men's Light Heavyweight |
| Gold medal – first place | 1974 Christchurch | Men's Middle Heavyweight |

Nick Ciancio (21 February 1947 – 7 March 2026) was an Australian weightlifter. He competed in the men's middle heavyweight event at the 1972 Summer Olympics. Ciancio died in Melbourne on 7 March 2026, at the age of 79.
