= Alex McAfee =

Northern Irish weightlifter

Personal information
- Nationality: British (Northern Irish)
- Born: Northern Ireland

Sport
- Sport: Weightlifting
- Event: Middleweight
- Club: St Gabriel's WC, Belfast

Alexander McAfee is a former weightlifter from Northern Ireland, who represented Northern Ireland at three Commonwealth Games.

== Biography ==
McAfee was a member of the St Gabriel's Weightlifting Club in Belfast, whih was started by his brother Tommy McAfee, who was also a prominent weightlifter.

McAfee represented the 1966 Northern Irish Team at the 1966 British Empire and Commonwealth Games in Kingston, Jamaica, participating in the 75kg middleweight category.

By 1970, Alex had stepped up in weight category, lifting in the light-heavyweight class.

He went to his second Commonwealth Games in 1970, as part of the 1970 Northern Irish Team in Edinburgh, Scotland. He won the Ulster title in 1970 and the Irish national title in 1973.

Both brothers competed at the 1974 British Commonwealth Games but upset the authorities when leaving the team camp without permission for the weekend. The incident led to a two-year ban for the brothers.
