= Peter Arthur =

British weightlifter (born 1939)

Personal information
- Nationality: British (Welsh)
- Born: 4 April 1939 (age 87) Swansea, Wales
- Height: 171 cm (5 ft 7 in)
- Weight: 90 kg (198 lb)

Sport
- Sport: Weightlifting
- Events: Light-heavyweight, Middle-heavyweight
- Club: Samurai, Swansea

Peter John Henry Arthur (born 4 April 1939) is a British weightlifter. He competed at the 1968 Summer Olympics and the 1972 Summer Olympics.

== Biography ==
Arthur represented the 1962 Welsh team at the 1962 British Empire and Commonwealth Games in Perth, Australia, where he participated in the 82.5kg mid-heavyweight category. He went to his second Commonwealth Games in Kingston, Jamaica, competing for the 1966 Welsh team in the 82.5kg weight class.

At the 1968 Olympic Games in Mexico City, Arthur participated in the 82.5 kg light-heavyweight category. Four years later he competed in the heavier weight category of 90kg mid-heavyweight at the 1972 Olympic Games in Munich.
