= Arthur Shannos =

Australian weightlifter (1938–2002)

Personal information
- Nationality: Australian
- Born: 4 March 1938 Ithaca, Queensland, Australia
- Died: 1 September 2002 (aged 64)

Sport
- Sport: Weightlifting
Medal record
Weightlifting
Representing Australia
British Empire (and Commonwealth) Games
Bronze medal – third place	1958 Cardiff	Men's Heavyweight
Gold medal – first place	1962 Perth	Men's Heavyweight
Silver medal – second place	1966 Kingston	Men's Heavyweight

Arthur Shannos (4 March 1938 – 1 September 2002) was an Australian weightlifter.

== Career ==
He competed at the 1960 Summer Olympics and the 1964 Summer Olympics.
