= George Vassiliadis =

Australian weightlifter

Personal information
- Nationality: Australian
- Born: 14 December 1949 (age 76) Cyprus

Sport
- Sport: Weightlifting

George Vassiliadis (born 14 December 1949) is an Australian weightlifter. He competed in the men's bantamweight event at the 1972 Summer Olympics.
