= Bruce Cameron (weightlifter) =

New Zealand weightlifter

Bruce Cameron ONZM
Personal information
- Born: Bruce George Cameron; 1941/1942

Sport
- Country: New Zealand
- Sport: Weightlifting
Medal record
Representing New Zealand
Men's weightlifting
British Commonwealth Games
| Bronze medal – third place | 1970 Edinburgh | 67.5 kg |
| Bronze medal – third place | 1974 Christchurch | 67.5 kg |

Bruce George Cameron ONZM (born 1941/42) is a former weightlifter for New Zealand. He won two bronze medals at British Commonwealth Games representing New Zealand.

Cameron's early sporting career was as a rugby union player, touring Australia with the Junior All Blacks in 1964, but he later took up weightlifting due to injury.

Cameron competed in the 60 kg division in weightlifting at the 1966 British Empire and Commonwealth Games, finishing eighth. He won the bronze medal at the 1970 British Commonwealth Games in the men's 67.5 kg grade. Then four years later at the 1974 British Commonwealth Games he won the bronze medal in the same grade.

He was a New Zealand Olympic team selector from 1977 to 2005.

In 1990, Cameron was awarded the New Zealand 1990 Commemoration Medal. In the 2006 New Year Honours, he was appointed an Officer of the New Zealand Order of Merit, for services to sport.
