= Russell Perry (weightlifter) =

Australian weightlifter (born 1938)

Neville Pery
Personal information
- Full name: Russell Neville Pery
- Nationality: Australian
- Born: 13 March 1938 (age 88) Townsville, Queensland, Australia

Sport
- Sport: Weightlifting
Medal record
CommonwealthGames
Bronze medal – third place	1966 Kingston	Men's Middleweight
Gold medal – first place	1970 Edinburgh	Men's Middleweight

Russell Neville Pery (born 13 March 1938), also known as Neville Russell Pery or Russell Perry, is an Australian weightlifter. He competed in the 1960 Summer Olympics in the lightweight division and in the 1968 Summer Olympics in the light heavyweight division. He is from Townsville in Queensland.
