= Terry Perdue =

British weightlifter

Personal information
- Nationality: British (Welsh)
- Born: 10 November 1940 Swansea, Wales
- Died: 19 August 1998 (aged 57) Swansea, Wales
- Height: 182 cm (6 ft 0 in)
- Weight: 144 kg (317 lb)

Sport
- Sport: Weightlifting
- Club: Samurai WC, Swansea

Terence Robert John Perdue (10 November 1940 – 19 August 1998) was a British weightlifter. He competed at the 1968 Summer Olympics and the 1972 Summer Olympics.

== Biography ==
Perdue represented the 1966 Welsh team at the 1966 British Empire and Commonwealth Games in Kingston, Jamaica, participating in the 110kg heavyweight event.

In 1971, Perdue, a scrap dealer in Swansea, was arrested along with two other men and charged with the theft of 41,000 pounds of metal. He was sentenced to four years in prison but was acquitted on appeal after serving nine months, just in time to join the British Olympic team for the 1972 Games.

He was one of the weightlifters featured in the Mai Zetterling-directed segment The Strongest in Visions of Eight. He was described by Robert H. Boyle in the 8 October 1973 issue of Sports Illustrated as "bearded, stuffs 320 pounds into a six-foot frame and could be played in a film by Peter Ustinov."
