= Brian Marsden (weightlifter) =

New Zealand weightlifter (born 1947)

Personal information
- Born: 29 September 1955 (age 70) Masterton, New Zealand
- Height: 1.71 m (5 ft 7 1/2 in)
- Weight: 90 kg (200 lb)

Sport
- Country: New Zealand
- Sport: Weightlifting
Medal record
Commonwealth Games
Bronze medal – third place	1978 Edmonton	– 90 kg
Silver medal – second place	1974 Christchurch	– 90 kg

Brian Michael Marsden (born 29 September 1955) is a weightlifter from New Zealand. He competed at the 1972 Summer Olympics in the Light-heavyweight class, and the 1976 Summer Olympics in the Middle-heavyweight class, coming 12th at each games.

He competed in the Men's 90 kg class at the 1974 British Commonwealth Games where he won a silver, and the 1978 Commonwealth Games where he won a bronze.

In 1971 he was named Sportsperson of the Year at the Taranaki Sports Awards.
