= Precious McKenzie =

New Zealand weightlifter

Precious McKenzie MBE
Personal information
- Born: Precious Patrick McKenzie; 6 June 1936 (age 90) Durban, Natal, Union of South Africa
- Height: 145 cm (4 ft 9 in)

Sport
- Sport: Weightlifting
Medal record
Men's weightlifting
Commonwealth Games
Representing England
Gold medal – first place	1966 Kingston	Bantamweight
Gold medal – first place	1970 Edinburgh	Bantamweight
Gold medal – first place	1974 Christchurch	Flyweight
Representing New Zealand
Gold medal – first place	1978 Edmonton	Bantamweight

Precious Patrick McKenzie MBE (born 6 June 1936) is a South African-born former Olympic weightlifter and powerlifter who won Commonwealth titles representing both England and New Zealand and has won several world powerlifting and masters world powerlifting titles. He is of diminutive stature at 1.45 metres (4 ft 9 in).

He was appointed Member of the Order of the British Empire (MBE) in the 1974 Birthday Honours for services to weightlifting.

== Career ==
Born in Durban, Union of South Africa, Precious McKenzie suffered from ill-health during his childhood. An ambition to be a circus performer ended because of South Africa's racist laws and this led him to weight training and weightlifting. Although he was ranked the best weightlifter in his weight category in South Africa, he was barred from representing his country at the 1958 British Empire and Commonwealth Games that year because he was classified as "Coloured" under the apartheid regime he was also excluded from the South African team for the 1960 Rome Olympiad. In 1963, he was told he could be included in the South African team for the 1964 Olympics, provided he was segregated from the white members of the team. He refused and left South Africa for Britain in 1964 with his wife and young family. British minister for sport, Denis Howell, fast-tracked his citizenship application to allow him to compete for England in the 1966 Commonwealth Games in Jamaica where he won gold.

Initially working as a clicker in a Northampton shoe factory, he moved to Bristol where he completed a Physical Education degree.

McKenzie competed in three Empire and Commonwealth Games representing England and at three Olympics (1968, 1972 and 1976) representing Britain. As a result of contacts made during the 1974 Commonwealth Games in Christchurch, New Zealand, he decided to settle in that country, where he was offered the opportunity to be a weight trainer in a gym. He settled in the North Island city of Auckland and won his fourth Commonwealth gold representing New Zealand at the age of 42 at the 1978 Commonwealth Games in Edmonton. He has won more Commonwealth and world medals in his sport than any other person, competing in both the bantam and flyweight divisions.

During the 1970s McKenzie appeared on the children's magazine programme Blue Peter on UK BBC 1.

His 607 kg (1,339 lb) total in the 123 lb class, was achieved in 1979, holding the world record for 39 years before being broken on April, 27, 2019 at the Kern US Open by female powerlifter Marianna Gasparyan who posted a 1,350.3 total a world record she still holds.

He subsequently became a private consultant in the field of back injury prevention and the New Zealand Safety Council's Manual Handling Advisor, running courses in New Zealand, Australia, Singapore, the United Kingdom and United States.

In 2006, he was recognised by his native country with an induction into the South African Sports Hall of Fame.

In 2008, a film was planned about his life. A New Zealand-based father-son team had a screenplay and sought funding in Cannes. They hoped to start shooting in South Africa by early November 2008. The relationship between McKenzie and the film makers deteriorated and ended in 2012 when McKenzie became disappointed with the slow pace of progress.

== Documentary film ==
- McKenzie was one of nine athletes featured in a National Film Board of Canada documentary on the Edmonton Commonwealth Games, Going the Distance (1979).
