= Malaysia at the 2002 Commonwealth Games =

- CGF code: MAS
- CGA: Olympic Council of Malaysia
- Website: olympic.org.my

in Manchester, England
- Competitors: 122 in 14 sports
- Medals Ranked 8th: Gold 7 Silver 9 Bronze 18 Total 34

Commonwealth Games appearances (overview)
- 1950; 1954; 1958; 1962; 1966; 1970; 1974; 1978; 1982; 1986; 1990; 1994; 1998; 2002; 2006; 2010; 2014; 2018; 2022; 2026; 2030

Other related appearances
- British North Borneo (1958, 1962); Sarawak (1958, 1962)

Malaysia competed in the 2002 Commonwealth Games held in Manchester, England from 25 July to 4 August 2002. It won 7 gold, 9 silver and 18 bronze medals.

== Medal summary ==
=== Medals by sport ===
Sport	Gold	Silver	Bronze	Total	Rank
Athletics	0	1	1	2	16
Badminton	3	3	3	9	1
Boxing	0	0	1	1	16
Gymnastics	0	1	1	2	6
Lawn bowls	1	0	3	4	4
Shooting	0	2	2	4	8
Squash	0	1	0	1	5
Swimming	0	1	1	2	9
Weightlifting	3	0	6	9	4
Total	7	9	18	34	8

=== Multiple medalists ===
Malaysian competitors that have won at least two medals.

Name	Sport	Gold	Silver	Bronze	Total
Amirul Hamizan Ibrahim	Weightlifting	3			3
Alex Lim	Swimming		1	1	2
Chin Eei Hui	Badminton		1	1	2
Edmund Yeo Thien Chuan	Weightlifting			2	2

=== Medallists ===
Medal	Name	Sport	Event	Date
Gold	Muhammad Hafiz Hashim	Badminton	Men's singles	4 August
Gold	Chan Chong Ming; Chew Choon Eng	Badminton	Men's doubles	4 August
Gold	Ang Li Peng; Lim Pek Siah	Badminton	Women's doubles	4 August
Gold	Siti Zalina Ahmad	Lawn bowls	Women's singles	4 August
Gold	Amirul Hamizan Ibrahim	Weightlifting	Men's 56 kg snatch	30 July
Gold	Amirul Hamizan Ibrahim	Weightlifting	Men's 56 kg clean and jerk	30 July
Gold	Amirul Hamizan Ibrahim	Weightlifting	Men's 56 kg combined	30 July
Silver	Hisham Khaironi	Athletics	Men's 100 metres EAD	31 July
Silver	Lee Tsuen Seng	Badminton	Men's singles	4 August
Silver	Chang Kim Wai; Choong Tan Fook	Badminton	Men's doubles	4 August
Silver	Chew Choon Eng; Chin Eei Hui	Badminton	Mixed doubles	4 August
Silver	Ng Shu Wai	Gymnastics	Men's floor	29 July
Silver	Mohamed Hameleay Abdul Mutalib; Mohammed Emran Zakaria	Shooting	Men's pairs 10 metre air rifle	27 July
Silver	Bibiana Ng Pei Chin; Irina Maharani	Shooting	Women's pairs 25 metre sport pistol	30 July
Silver	Ong Beng Hee; Nicol David	Squash	Mixed doubles	4 August
Silver	Alex Lim	Swimming	Men's 50 metre backstroke	31 July
Bronze	Yuan Yufang	Athletics	Women's 20 kilometres walk	28 July
Bronze	Wong Choong Hann	Badminton	Men's singles	4 August
Bronze	Ng Mee Fen	Badminton	Women's singles	4 August
Bronze	Chin Eei Hui; Wong Pei Tty	Badminton	Women's doubles	4 August
Bronze	Zamzai Azizi Mohamad	Boxing	Men's light flyweight (48 kg)	3 August
Bronze	Loke Yik Siang	Gymnastics	Men's pommel horse	29 July
Bronze	Mohamed Aziz Maswadi; Safuan Said	Lawn bowls	Men's pairs	4 August
Bronze	Mohd Sabki Mohd Din; Mohammed Emran Zakaria	Shooting	Men's pairs 50 metre rifle prone	28 July
Bronze	Roslina Bakar	Shooting	Women's individual 50 metre rifle prone three position	2 August
Bronze	Alex Lim	Swimming	Men's 100 metre backstroke	3 August
Bronze	Mohd Faizal Baharom	Weightlifting	Men's 56 kg snatch	30 July
Bronze	Roswadi Abdul Rashid	Weightlifting	Men's 62 kg snatch	30 July
Bronze	Muhamad Hidayat Hamidon	Weightlifting	Men's 69 kg clean and jerk	31 July
Bronze	Edmund Yeo Thien Chuan	Weightlifting	Men's 105 kg clean and jerk	2 August
Bronze	Edmund Yeo Thien Chuan	Weightlifting	Men's 105 kg combined	2 August
Bronze	Cheok Kon Fatt	Weightlifting	Men's bench press EAD	3 August

== Athletics ==
Men
Track event

Athlete	Event	Heat		Semifinal		Final	
Athlete	Event	Result	Rank	Result	Rank	Result	Rank
Mohd Hisham Khaironi	100 m EAD B1/B2	11.62 PB	2 Q	11.83	2 Q	11.53 PB	2nd place, silver medalist(s)

Field event

Athlete	Event	Qualification		Final	
Athlete	Event	Distance	Position	Distance	Position
Teh Weng Chiang	Pole vault	—N/a		4.90	9

Women
Track and road events

Athlete	Event	Heat		Semifinal		Final	
Athlete	Event	Result	Rank	Result	Rank	Result	Rank
Chow Mei Hsia	800 m EAD wheelchair	—N/a		2:23.70 PB	8 q	DSQ	–
Yuan Yufang	20 km walk	—N/a				1:40:00	3rd place, bronze medalist(s)

Key

- Note–Ranks given for track events are within the athlete's heat only
- Q = Qualified for the next round
- q = Qualified for the next round as a fastest loser or, in field events, by position without achieving the qualifying target
- NR = National record
- N/A = Round not applicable for the event
- Bye = Athlete not required to compete in round

== Badminton ==
Individual

Athlete	Event	Round of 128	Round of 64	Round of 32	Round of 16	Quarterfinals	Semifinals	Final	Rank
Athlete	Event	Opposition Score	Opposition Score	Opposition Score	Opposition Score	Opposition Score	Opposition Score	Opposition Score	Rank
Lee Tsuen Seng (2)	Men's singles	Bye	Liam Ingram (WAL); W 7-2, 7-0, 7-2	Hyder Aboobakar (MRI); W 7-0, 7-0, 7-3	Nikhil Kanetkar (IND); W 7-3, 4-7, 7-4, 4-7, 7-5	Geoff Bellingham (NZL); W 7-4, 7-0, 7-2	Wong Choong Hann (MAS); W 7-4, 7-0, 7-1	Gold medal match Muhammad Hafiz Hashim (MAS); L 3-7, 1-7, 7-3, 8-7, 4-7	2nd place, silver medalist(s)
Muhammad Hafiz Hashim (3)	Men's singles	Bye	Oreeditse Thela (BOT); W 7-0, 7-0, 7-1	Ryan Holder (BAR); W 7-0, 7-1, 7-1	Stuart Brehaut (AUS); W 7-0, 7-0, 7-1	Nick Hall (NZL); W 8-6, 7-4, 7-4	Wong Choong Hann (MAS); W 6-8, 8-6, 7-0, 7-8, 7-3	Gold medal match Lee Tsuen Seng (MAS); W 7-3, 7-1, 3-7, 7-8, 7-4	1st place, gold medalist(s)
Wong Choong Hann (1)	Men's singles	Bye	Ayim Noah (GHA); W 7-1, 7-0, 7-1	Martyn Lewis (WAL); W 7-1, 7-3, 7-1	John Gordon (NZL); W 7-0, 7-2, 7-2	Pullela Gopichand (IND); W 7-1, 7-1, 7-4	Muhammad Hafiz Hashim (MAS); L 8-6, 6-8, 0-7, 8-7, 3-7	Did not advance	3rd place, bronze medalist(s)
Ng Mee Fen	Women's singles	—N/a	Bye	Kellie Lucas (AUS); W 7-1, 7-0, 7-3	Trupti Murgunde (IND); W 5-7, 7-2, 7-3, 4-7, 7-2	Julia Mann (ENG); W 2-7, 7-2, 7-2, 7-5	Li Li (SIN); L 3-7, 0-7, 1-7	Did not advance	3rd place, bronze medalist(s)
Wong Mew Choo	Women's singles	—N/a	Bye	Nicole Gordon (NZL); L 4-7, 3-7, 3-7	Did not advance				

Doubles

Athlete	Event	Round of 64	Round of 32	Round of 16	Quarterfinals	Semifinals	Final	
Athlete	Event	Opposition Score	Opposition Score	Opposition Score	Opposition Score	Opposition Score	Opposition Score	Rank
Chan Chong Ming; Chew Choon Eng (1)	Men's doubles	Bye	Martyn Lewis & Matthew Hughes (WAL); W 7-2, 7-1, 7-0	Anil Seepaul & Kerwyn Pantin (TRI); W 7-0, 7-0, 7-1	William Milroy & Keith Chan (CAN); W 7-4, 7-1, 7-1	James Anderson & Simon Archer (ENG); W 7-4, 7-5, 7-2	Gold medal match Choong Tan Fook & Chang Kim Wai (MAS); W 7-5, 4-7, 2-7, 7-5, 7-3	1st place, gold medalist(s)
Choong Tan Fook; Chang Kim Wai	Men's doubles	Simon Gaines & Jannik Jonnson (IOM); W 7-1, 7-0, 7-1	Ola Fagbemi & Ocholi Edicha (NGR); W 7-4, 7-1, 7-2	Travis Denney & Ashley Brehaut (AUS); W 7-3, 7-5, 7-3	Daniel Shirley & John Gordon (NZL); W 8-7, 7-8, 7-3, 7-2	Nathan Robertson & Andrew Clark (ENG); W 8-6, 7-3, 7-4	Gold medal match Chan Chong Ming & Chew Choon Eng (MAS); L 5-7, 7-4, 7-2, 5-7, 3-7	2nd place, silver medalist(s)
Ang Li Peng; Lim Pek Siah (6)	Women's doubles	—N/a	Mary Ennoo & Theresa Tetteh (GHA); W W/O	Sandra Watt & Yuan Wemyss (SCO); W 7-4, 7-4, 7-4	Tammy Sun & Denyse Julien (CAN); W 7-0, 7-1, 7-4	Gail Emms & Joanne Goode (ENG); W 7-4, 6-8, 8-6, 7-4	Gold medal match Nicole Gordon & Sara Petersen (NZL); W 7-8, 7-4, 2-7, 7-5, 7-0	1st place, gold medalist(s)
Chin Eei Hui; Wong Pei Tty	Women's doubles	—N/a	Kate Wilson-Smith & Rhonda Cator (AUS); W 3-7, 7-5, 7-0, 7-5	Miriam Sude & Grace Daniels (NGR); W 7-2, 7-2, 7-0	Felicity Gallup & Jo Muggeridge (WAL); W 4-7, 1-7, 7-1, 7-0, 7-4	Nicole Gordon & Sara Petersen (NZL); L 3-7, 3-7, 3-7	Did not advance	3rd place, bronze medalist(s)
Chan Chong Ming; Lim Pek Siah	Mixed doubles	Georgie Cupidon & Juliette Ah-Wan (SEY); W 7-0, 7-1, 8-6	Keith Chan & Milaine Cloutier (CAN); W 7-5, 7-3, 7-4	Patrick Lau & Jiang Yanmei (SIN); L 6-8, 4-7, 2-7	Did not advance			
Chang Kim Wai; Wong Pei Tty	Mixed doubles	Mmoloki Motlhala & Joyce Malebogo Arone (BOT); W 7-1, 7-1, 7-1	Matthew Hughes & Robyn Ashworth (WAL); W 7-4, 7-5, 7-4	Anthony Clark & Sara Sankey (ENG); L 2-7, 0-7, 3-7	Did not advance			
Chew Choon Eng; Chin Eei Hui	Mixed doubles	Bye	Neil Cottrill & Jo Muggeridge (WAL); W 7-0, 7-0, 7-0	Chris Blair & Tammy Jenkins (NZL); W 4-7, 7-2, 1-7, 7-3, 7-4	Nathan Robertson & Gail Emms (ENG); W 7-5, 8-6, 1-7, 7-4	Anthony Clark & Sara Sankey (ENG); W 4-7, 3-7, 7-4, 7-4, 7-0	Gold medal match Simon Archer & Joanne Goode (ENG); L 7-0, 5-7, 3-7, 3-7	2nd place, silver medalist(s)

Team

Athlete	Event	Group stage		Semifinals	Final	
Athlete	Event	Opposition Score	Rank	Opposition Score	Opposition Score	Rank
Ang Li Peng; Chan Chong Ming; Chang Kim Wai; Chew Choon Eng; Chin Eei Hui; Choong Tan Fook; Muhammad Hafiz Hashim; Lee Tsuen Seng; Lim Pek Siah; Ng Mee Fen; Wong Choong Hann; Wong Mew Choo; Wong Pei Tty	Mixed team	England; L 2-3; Canada; W 4-1; Nigeria; W 5-0	2	Did not advance		

== Boxing ==
Men

Athlete	Event	Round of 32	Round of 16	Quarterfinals	Semifinals	Final	
Athlete	Event	Opposition Result	Opposition Result	Opposition Result	Opposition Result	Opposition Result	Rank
Zamzai Azizi Mohamad	Light flyweight (48 kg)	—N/a	Tasleem Shah (FIJ); W RSCO	Joseph Jermia (NAM); W 15–14	Darran Langley (ENG); L 18–19	Did not advance	3rd place, bronze medalist(s)
Rakib Ahmad	Flyweight (51 kg)	Bye	Wilson Masamba (MAW); W 23–7	Lechedzani Luza (NAM); L DSQ	Did not advance		
Adnan Yusoh	Lightweight (60 kg)	Polydoros Polydorou (CYP); W RSCI	Antonin Hortie-Decarie (CAN); W 22–15	Jamie Arthur (WAL); L RSC	Did not advance		
Zainuddin Sidi	Light welterweight (63.5 kg)	Davidson Emenogu (NGR); L RSCI	Did not advance				
Shuhairi Hussain	Welterweight (63.5 kg)	Tony Cesay (SLE); L 9–26	Did not advance				

== Cycling ==
=== Road ===
Athlete	Event	Time	Rank
Chung Hsu Min	Women's road race	DNF	

=== Track ===
Sprint

Athlete	Event	Qualification		Round 1	Round 2	1/8 finals	Quarterfinals	Semifinals	Final	
Athlete	Event	Qualification		Opposition Time	Opposition Time	Opposition Time	Quarterfinals	Semifinals	Final	
Athlete	Event	Qualification		Repechage 1	Repechage 2	1/8 repechage	Quarterfinals	Semifinals	Final	
Athlete	Event	Time Speed (km/h)	Rank	Opposition Time	Opposition Time	Opposition Time	Opposition Time	Opposition Time	Opposition Time	Rank
Ghaffuan Ghazali	Men's sprint	10.911	19 Q	L Madsen (CAN); L	Did not advance					
Ghaffuan Ghazali	Men's sprint	10.911	19 Q	Did not advance			—N/a			
Josiah Ng	Men's sprint	10.495	8 Q	Bye	A McMath (NIR); W	J Dajka (AUS); L	S Eadie (AUS); L	Bye	5th – 8th classification R Edgar (SCO); A Slater (ENG); B Forde (BAR); W 11.202	5
Josiah Ng	Men's sprint	10.495	8 Q	Bye	Bye	C MacLean (SCO); J Grace (NZL); W	—N/a			
Fairoz Izni Abdul Ghani; Ghaffuan Ghazali; Josiah Ng	Men's team sprint	47.874; 56.397	6 Q	—N/a				Scotland; C MacLean; R Edgar; C Hoy; L 47.572	Did not advance	
Fairoz Izni Abdul Ghani; Ghaffuan Ghazali; Josiah Ng	Men's team sprint	47.874; 56.397	6 Q	—N/a						
Chung Hsu Min	Women's sprint	15.153	7 Q	—N/a			K Meares (AUS); L	Did not advance	5th – 8th classification L	
Chung Hsu Min	Women's sprint	15.153	7 Q	—N/a						

Pursuit

Athlete	Event	Qualification		Final	
Athlete	Event	Time Speed (km/h)	Rank	Opposition Time	Rank
Chung Hsu Min	Women's individual pursuit	4:04.085; 44.244	9	Did not advance	

Points race

Athlete	Event	Qualification		Final	
Athlete	Event	Points	Rank	Points	Rank
Chung Hsu Min	Women's points race	—N/a		0	10

|}

== Diving ==
Men

Athlete	Event	Preliminaries		Semifinal		Final	
Athlete	Event	Points	Rank	Points	Rank	Points	Rank
Nor Aznizal Najib	3 m springboard	215.97	7 Q	—N/a		368.10	9
Rossharisham Roslan	3 m springboard	213.75	11 Q	—N/a		297.69	11
Low Lap Bun	10 m platform	159.18	9 Q	—N/a		339.78	8
Nor Aznizal Najib	10 m platform	180.00	6 Q	—N/a		396.66	6

Women

Athlete	Event	Preliminaries		Semifinal		Final	
Athlete	Event	Points	Rank	Points	Rank	Points	Rank
Leong Mun Yee	3 m springboard	209.79	7 Q	—N/a		266.34	6
Leong Mun Yee	10 m platform	160.71	7 Q	—N/a		280.98	6

== Gymnastics ==
=== Artistic ===
Men

Athlete	Event								
Athlete	Event	F Rank	PH Rank	R Rank	V Rank	PB Rank	HB Rank	Total	Rank
Heng Wah Mai	Qualification	8.200	—N/a					8.200	
Loke Yik Siang	Qualification	8.800	9.100; Q	7.900	8.850	7.900	7.850	50.400	Q
Ng Shu Wai	Qualification	8.800; Q	8.450	7.800	8.700	8.700; Q	8.400	50.850	Q
Onn Kwang Tung	Qualification	—N/a	8.700	7.250	8.825	7.800	8.300	40.875	
Ooi Wei Siang	Qualification	8.100	8.500	7.700	9.025	8.250	8.300	49.875	Q
Heng Wah Mai; Loke Yik Siang; Ng Shu Wai; Onn Kwang Tung; Ooi Wei Siang	Team all-around	25.800; 5	26.300; 5	23.400; 5	26.700; 5	24.850; 5	25.000; 5	152.050	5
Loke Yik Siang	Individual all-around	8.950; 4	9.050; 4	7.800; 19	8.750; 20	8.300; 14	8.150; 10	51.000	8
Ng Shu Wai	Individual all-around	9.225; 2	9.100; 2	8.100; 11	8.925; 15	8.600; 6	8.750; 6	52.700	4
Ooi Wei Siang	Individual all-around	8.700; 10	7.600; 18	7.650; 22	9.000; 11	7.950; 18	7.950; 13	48.850	17
Ng Shu Wai	Floor	9.300; 2	—N/a					9.300	2nd place, silver medalist(s)
Loke Yik Siang	Pommel horse	—N/a	9.062; 3	—N/a				9.062	3rd place, bronze medalist(s)
Ng Shu Wai	Parallel bars	—N/a				8.600; 6	—N/a	8.600	6

== Hockey ==
=== Women's tournament ===
Pool 1

	Team	Points	G	W	D	L	GF	GA	Diff
1.	Australia	9	3	3	0	0	25	1	+24
2.	South Africa	6	3	2	0	1	16	5	+11
3.	Scotland	3	3	1	0	2	7	7	0
4.	Malaysia	0	3	0	0	3	0	35	−35

Qualified for the semifinals
Qualified for the quarterfinals

26 July 2002
13:00

Malaysia	0 – 11	South Africa

27 July 2002
19:30

Malaysia	0 – 6	Scotland

29 July 2002
11:00

Australia	18 – 0	Malaysia

Seventh and eighth place match

1 August 2002
10:00

Malaysia	0 – 5	Canada

Ranked 8th in final standings

== Lawn bowls ==
Men

Athlete	Event	Group stage		Quarterfinal	Semifinal	Final	
Athlete	Event	Opposition Score	Rank	Opposition Score	Opposition Score	Opposition Score	Rank
Syed Mohamad Syed Akil	Singles	Steve Glasson (AUS); L 9–21; Abdul Rahman Omar (BRU); L 20–21; Ian Merrien (GUE); W 21–11; Robert John Donnelly (RSA); W 21–15; Ieremia Leautuli (SAM); W 21–17	3	Did not advance			
Mohamed Aziz Maswadi; Safuan Said	Pairs	Brunei; W 23–14; Cook Islands; L 14–16; Fiji; T 12–12; Northern Ireland; W 16–6; Samoa; W 18–5; Scotland; L 11–12; Wales; T 17–17	2 Q	Jersey; W 15–14	England; L 6–15	Did not advance	3rd place, bronze medalist(s)
Fairul Izwan Abd Muin; Jozaini Johari; Mohamad Sukri Abdul Mutalib; Sazali Sani	Fours	Australia; L 8–18; Cook Islands; W 13–12; England; T 12–12	3	Did not advance			
Lamin Azmi; Lim Hong Hing; Harajinder Singh Mahinder Singh	Triples EAD	England; T 14–14; Kenya; L 5–13; New Zealand; T 0–0; Wales; W 20–6	2	—N/a		Did not advance	

Women

Athlete	Event	Group stage		Quarterfinal	Semifinal	Final	
Athlete	Event	Opposition Score	Rank	Opposition Score	Opposition Score	Opposition Score	Rank
Siti Zalina Ahmad	Singles	Laura Dewald (CAN); W 21–9; Alison Merrien (GUE); W 21–13; Susan Kariuki (KEN); W 21–12; Jane Rigby (ZIM); L 17–21	1 Q	Jeannie Baker (ENG); W 21–14	Marlene Castle (NZL); W 21–14	Gold medal match Karen Murphy (AUS); W 21–19	1st place, gold medalist(s)
Nazura Ngahat; Sarimah Abu Bakar	Pairs	Australia; L 12–14; Cook Islands; L 13–15; South Africa; L 11–16; Samoa; W 20–6	4	Did not advance			
Azlina Arshad; Chui Me B Haslah Hasan; Nor Hashimah Ismail	Fours	Cook Islands; W 25–6; Fiji; L 13–16; Jersey; W 24–1; Northern Ireland; L 13–15; New Zealand; L 14–19; South Africa; W 18–9	3 Q	England; L 10–20	Did not advance		
Moira Mukri	Singles EAD	Vanessa Hinton (AUS); W 15–8; Ruth Small (ENG); L 1–15; Susan Njani (KEN); W 15–7; Gloria Hopkins (WAL); W 15–4	2	—N/a		Did not advance	

== Rugby sevens ==
=== Men's tournament ===
Malaysia has qualified a rugby sevens team.

Pool D

Team	Pld	W	D	L	PF	PA	PD	Pts
Australia	3	3	0	0	133	12	+121	9
Fiji	3	2	0	1	160	19	+141	7
Malaysia	3	1	0	2	45	135	-90	5
Trinidad and Tobago	3	0	0	3	7	179	−172	3

Qualified for medal competition
Qualified for bowl competition

2 August 2002

Malaysia	0–55	Australia

City of Manchester Stadium, Manchester

2 August 2002

Malaysia	0–73	Fiji

City of Manchester Stadium, Manchester

2 August 2002

Malaysia	45–7	Trinidad and Tobago

City of Manchester Stadium, Manchester

Bowl
Quarterfinal

3 August 2002

Malaysia	0–52	Cook Islands

City of Manchester Stadium, Manchester

== Shooting ==
Men
Pistol/Small bore

Athlete	Event	Qualification		Final	
Athlete	Event	Points	Rank	Points	Rank
Hasli Izwan Amir Hasan	25 m rapid fire pistol individual	288	3 Q	666.0	4
Mohamed Hameleay Abdul Mutalib	10 m air rifle individual	567	20	Did not advance	
Mohammed Emran Zakaria	10 m air rifle individual	586	6 Q	686.5	6
Mohamed Hameleay Abdul Mutalib; Mohammed Emran Zakaria	10 m air rifle pairs	—N/a		1164	2nd place, silver medalist(s)
Mohammed Emran Zakaria	50 m rifle prone individual	584	13	Did not advance	
Mohd Sabki Mohd Din	50 m rifle prone individual	587	10	Did not advance	
Mohammed Emran Zakaria; Mohd Sabki Mohd Din	50 m rifle prone pairs	—N/a		1173	3rd place, bronze medalist(s)
Mohammed Emran Zakaria	50 m rifle three positions individual	1141	8 Q	1235.4	6
Mohd Sabki Mohd Din	50 m rifle three positions individual	1138	9	Did not advance	
Mohammed Emran Zakaria; Mohd Sabki Mohd Din	50 m rifle three positions pairs	—N/a		2251	7

Shotgun

Athlete	Event	Qualification		Final	
Athlete	Event	Points	Rank	Points	Rank
Richard Cheong Yew Kwan	Skeet individual	72	4 Q	143	4
Ricky Teh Chee Fei	Skeet individual	69	9	Did not advance	
Richard Cheong Yew Kwan; Ricky Teh Chee Fei	Skeet pairs	—N/a		178	9

Full bore

Athlete	Event	Stage 1			Stage 2			Stage 3		Total score	Rank
Athlete	Event	300x	500x	600x	300x	500x	600x	900x	1000x	Total score	Rank
Zainal Abidin Md Zain	Full bore rifle Queen's prize open individual	35.05	35.03	34.04	49.05	50.05	50.07	73.10	68.06	394.45	20
Zulkeflee Hamsan	Full bore rifle Queen's prize open individual	34.04	35.04	35.04	49.05	50.08	50.05	73.07	73.06	399.43	8
Zainal Abidin Md Zain	Full bore rifle Queen's prize open pairs	—N/a			49.08	49.07	49.06	73.05	70.04	579.61	11
Zulkeflee Hamsan	Full bore rifle Queen's prize open pairs	—N/a			50.08	46.06	49.04	73.09	71.04	579.61	11

Women
Pistol/Small bore

Athlete	Event	Qualification		Final	
Athlete	Event	Points	Rank	Points	Rank
Bibiana Ng Pei Chin	10 m air pistol individual	370	8 Q	463.5	8
Irina Maharani	10 m air pistol individual	377	4 Q	472.8	5
Bibiana Ng Pei Chin; Irina Maharani	10 m air pistol pairs	—N/a		717	6
Bibiana Ng Pei Chin	25 m sport pistol individual	287	4 Q	671.9	4
Irina Maharani	25 m sport pistol individual	287	4 Q	665.6	5
Bibiana Ng Pei Chin; Irina Maharani	25 m sport pistol pairs	—N/a		1135	2nd place, silver medalist(s)
Nurul Huda Baharin	10 m air rifle individual	385	10	Did not advance	
Roslina Bakar	10 m air rifle individual	386	6 Q	485.7	7
Nurul Huda Baharin; Roslina Bakar	10 m air rifle pairs	—N/a		772	6
Nurul Huda Baharin	50 m rifle prone individual	—N/a		584	6
Roslina Bakar	50 m rifle prone individual	—N/a		571	19
Nurul Huda Baharin; Roslina Bakar	50 m rifle prone pairs	—N/a		1152	10
Nurul Huda Baharin	50 m rifle three positions individual	560	12	Did not advance	
Roslina Bakar	50 m rifle three positions individual	567	4 Q	662.2	4
Nurul Huda Baharin; Roslina Bakar	50 m rifle three positions pairs	—N/a		1116	4

== Squash ==
Individual

Athlete	Event	Round of 64	Round of 32	Round of 16	Quarterfinals	Semifinals	Final	Rank
Athlete	Event	Opposition Score	Opposition Score	Opposition Score	Opposition Score	Opposition Score	Opposition Score	Rank
Kelvin Ho	Men's singles	P Chifunda (ZAM); L 9–5, 7–9, 3–9, 9–4, 2–9	Did not advance					
Kelvin Ho	Men's singles	—N/a	Plate Round of 32; T Sherratt (BER); L DNS	Did not advance				
Mohd Azlan Iskandar	Men's singles	G Wiltshire (GUY); W 9–0, 9–1, 9–2	L Beachill (ENG); L 3–9, 2–9, 1–9	Did not advance				
Ong Beng Hee	Men's singles	Bye	N Frankland (SCO); W 9–3, 9–4, 1–9, 9–3	G Ryding (CAN); L 9–3, 4–9, 2–9, 0–9	Did not advance			
Nicol David	Women's singles	—N/a	L-A Alexander (LCA); W 9–1, 9–0, 9–1	L Rorani (NZL); L 5–9, 10–8, 5–9, 2–9	Did not advance			
Sharon Wee	Women's singles	—N/a	A Simmons (LCA); W 9–1, 9–0, 9–0	S Fitz-Gerald (AUS); L 2–9, 0–9, 2–9	Did not advance			

Doubles

Athletes	Event	Group stage					Round of 16	Quarterfinal	Semifinal	Final	Rank
Athletes	Event	Opposition Score	Opposition Score	Opposition Score	Opposition Score	Rank	Opposition Score	Opposition Score	Opposition Score	Opposition Score	Rank
Kelvin Ho; Sharon Wee	Mixed doubles	G Wilson & L Rorani (NZL); L 0–2	C Walker & F Geaves (ENG); L 0–2	S Fitzgerald & K Hogan (WAL); W 2–0	L Fraser & N Fernandes (GUY); W 2–0	3	—N/a	Did not advance			
Ong Beng Hee; Nicol David	Mixed doubles	J Kneipp & R Cooper (AUS); W 2–1	S Richardson & M Perry (NIR); W 2–0	J Bullock & M West (JAM); W 2–0	—N/a	1 Q	—N/a	G Jones & K Hargreaves (WAL); W 15–13, 15–7	C Walker & F Geaves (ENG); L 14–15, 15–12, 14–15	Did not advance	3rd place, bronze medalist(s)

== Swimming ==
Men

Athlete	Event	Heat		Semifinal		Final	
Athlete	Event	Time	Rank	Time	Rank	Time	Rank
Wong Chee Kin	50 m freestyle EAD	47.34 GR	19	—N/a		Did not advance	
Yusup Dewa	50 m freestyle EAD	37.31 GR	17	—N/a		Did not advance	
Kwong Kong Thye	100 m freestyle EAD	1:26.33 GR	5	—N/a		Did not advance	
Yusup Dewa	100 m freestyle EAD	1:12.24	6	—N/a		Did not advance	
Alex Lim	50 m backstroke	26.14	3 Q	26.20	4 Q	25.67 NR	2nd place, silver medalist(s)
Alex Lim	100 m backstroke	57.88	11 Q	56.11	2 Q	55.44	3rd place, bronze medalist(s)
Alex Lim	200 m backstroke	2:04.40	10	—N/a		Did not advance	

Women

Athlete	Event	Heat		Semifinal		Final	
Athlete	Event	Time	Rank	Time	Rank	Time	Rank
Catherine Timpang Siang	100 m freestyle EAD	—N/a				1:44.69	13
Matia Baun Seling	100 m freestyle EAD	—N/a				2:11.78 GR	14
Siow Yi Ting	50 m breaststroke	34.40	12 Q	34.45	13	Did not advance	
Siow Yi Ting	100 m breaststroke	1:14.08	13 Q	1:13.65	13	Did not advance	
Siow Yi Ting	200 m breaststroke	2:34.29	10	—N/a		Did not advance	
Siow Yi Ting	200 m individual medley	2:23.83	15	—N/a		Did not advance	

== Synchronized swimming ==
Athlete	Event	Technical routine		Free routine		Total points	Rank
Athlete	Event	Score	Rank	Score	Rank	Total points	Rank
Suzanna Ghazali Bujang	Women's solo	39.083	5	39.750	5	78.833	5
Suzanna Ghazali Bujang; Sara Kamil Yusof	Women's duet	39.667	4	40.833	4	80.500	4

== Table tennis ==
Singles

Athletes	Event	Preliminary round		Round of 64	Round of 32	Round of 16	Quarterfinal	Semifinal	Final	Rank
Athletes	Event	Opposition Score	Rank	Opposition Score	Opposition Score	Opposition Score	Opposition Score	Opposition Score	Opposition Score	Rank
Beh Lee Fong	Women's singles	E Offiong (NGR); W 3–2; G Walker (ENG); W 3–2; M Kisakye (UGA); W 3–0	1 Q	—N/a	C Xu (CAN); L 11-9, 13-15, 11-13, 6-11, 11-9, 11-7, 6-11	Did not advance				
Beh Lee Wei	Women's singles	Bye		—N/a	P Ghatak (IND); L 6-11, 7-11, 13-11, 11-9, 9-11, 7-11	Did not advance				
Chiu Soo Jiin	Women's singles	K Parker (ENG); W 3–2; Tracey McLauchlan (NZL); W 3–0	1 Q	—N/a	O Oshonaike (NGR); L 6-11, 5-11, 6-11, 11-8, 9-11	Did not advance				
Ng Sock Khim	Women's singles	Cho Y W (AUS); W 3–2; F Achu (CMR); W 3–0; L Mokhoromeng (LES); W 3–0	1 Q	—N/a	M Das (IND); L 4-11, 2-11, 8-11, 12-10, 11-9, 7-11	Did not advance				
Pua Gin Chu	Women's singles EAD	A Moll (RSA); L 0–3; C Mitton (ENG); L 0–3; Omolara Afolabi (NGR); L 2–3	4	—N/a			Did not advance			
Raziyah Yacob	Women's singles EAD	J Boyd (AUS); L 0–3; C Harris (WAL); L 0–3; R Riese (RSA); L 0–3	4	—N/a			Did not advance			

Doubles

Athletes	Event	Round of 64	Round of 32	Round of 16	Quarterfinal	Semifinal	Final	Rank
Athletes	Event	Opposition Score	Opposition Score	Opposition Score	Opposition Score	Opposition Score	Opposition Score	Rank
Beh Lee Fong; Beh Lee Wei	Women's doubles	—N/a	Bye	M Das; P Ghatak (IND); W 11-9, 8-11, 6-11, 11-4, 12-10	S Tan P F Zhang XL (SIN); L 6-11, 11-9, 11-13, 8-11	Did not advance		
Beh Lee Fong; Beh Lee Wei	Women's doubles	—N/a	C O Offiong; D Yeye (NGR); W 11-5, 11-8, 9-11, 11-6	Miao M Lay J F (AUS); L 11-9, 4-11, 9-11, 13-11, 8-11	Did not advance			

Team

Athletes	Event	Preliminary round		Round of 16	Quarterfinal	Semifinal	Final	Rank
Athletes	Event	Opposition Score	Rank	Opposition Score	Opposition Score	Opposition Score	Opposition Score	Rank
Beh Lee Fong; Beh Lee Wei; Chiu Soo Jiin; Ng Sock Khim	Women's team	Canada; L 1–3; England; L 1–3; Barbados; W 3–0	3 Q	—N/a	Singapore; L 0–3	Did not advance	5th – 8th classification England; W 3–1; 5th – 6th classification India; W 3–1	5

== Triathlon ==
Men

Athlete	Event	Swim (1.5 km) Rank	Trans 1 Rank	Bike (40 km) Rank	Trans 2 Rank	Run (10 km) Rank	Total time	Rank
Eugene Chan	Individual	22:59.7; 30	36.4; 29	1:12:15.6; 32	31.6; 29	44:33.00	2:19:16.50	32
Muhamad Razani	Individual	26:18.8; 32	51.3; 34	1:08:43.1; 30	32.7; 32	40:17.18	2:15:03.18	30

== Weightlifting ==
Men

Athlete	Event	Snatch		Clean & jerk		Total	Rank
Athlete	Event	Result	Rank	Result	Rank	Total	Rank
Amirul Hamizan Ibrahim	56 kg	115	1st place, gold medalist(s)	145	1st place, gold medalist(s)	260	1st place, gold medalist(s)
Mohd Faizal Baharom	56 kg	110	3rd place, bronze medalist(s)	130	4	240	4
Roswadi Abdul Rashid	62 kg	115	3rd place, bronze medalist(s)	–	–	–	DNF
Muhamad Hidayat Hamidon	69 kg	130	5	167.5	3rd place, bronze medalist(s)	297.5	4
Edmund Yeo Thien Chuan	105 kg	145	4	170	3rd place, bronze medalist(s)	315	3rd place, bronze medalist(s)

Powerlifting

Athlete	Event	Result	Rank
Cheok Kon Fatt	Open bench press	144.1	3rd place, bronze medalist(s)
Mariappan Perumal	Open bench press	139.1	4
