= Weightlifting in India =

- Country: India
- Governing body: Indian Weightlifting Federation
- National team: India

Karnam Malleswari won a bronze medal in the 2000 Summer Olympics at Sydney, which made her the first Indian woman to win an Olympic medal. In 1992, she participated in the Asian championship which took place in Thailand and stood second and won three silver medals. She also won three Bronze medals in the world championship.

In the 2014 Commonwealth Games in Glasgow, Khumukcham Sanjita Chanu won the gold medal in the women's 48 kg category, while Mirabai Chanu took the silver in the same event. In the men's 56 kg category, Sukhen Dey won gold and Ganesh Mali won bronze and Sathish Sivalingam won the gold medal in the 77 kg category, with 149 kg snatch, and 179 kg clean and jerk lifts, totalling 328 kg. His lift of 149 kg in the snatch, set a new games record. Affin Varghese won the gold medal in the 57 kg category, with 114 kg snatch, and 130 kg clean and jerk lifts, totalling 298 kg. His lift of 139 kg in the snatch, set a new state record in the junior category.

The headquarters of the Indian Weightlifting Federation is in New Delhi. The Federation is affiliated to the Indian Olympic Association (Delhi) and is also a member of Asian Weightlifting Federation (Tehran) and International Weightlifting Federation (Budapest). The present General Secretary of Indian Weightlifting Federation is Mr. Sahdev Yadav.

The International Weightlifting Federation banned the Indian Weightlifting Federation from participating in all international competitions for one year, as three Indian women weightlifters—S Sunaina, Sanamacha Chanu and Pratima Kumari, were accused of doping offences in various international competitions in a single year.

== Medal table ==
As of 2024

Tournament	Gold	Silver	Bronze	Total
Olympic Games	0	1	1	2
World Championships	8	28	15	51
Asian Games	0	5	9	14
Commonwealth Games	46	51	36	133
Total	54	85	61	199

== Olympics record ==
Year	Event	Player	Result
2000
2000	Women's 69 kg	Karnam Malleswari	3rd place, bronze medalist(s)
2000	Women's 53 kg	Sanamacha Chanu	6th
2004
2004	Women's 48 kg	Kunjarani Devi	4th
2012
2012	Women's 48 kg	Ngangbam Soniya Chanu	7th
2020
2020	Women's 49 kg	Mirabai Chanu	2nd place, silver medalist(s)
2024
2024	Women's 49 kg	Mirabai Chanu	4th

== National award recipients ==
Year	Recipient	Award	Gender
1994–1995	Karnam Malleswari	Rajiv Gandhi Khel Ratna	Female
1995–1996	Nameirakpam Kunjarani	Rajiv Gandhi Khel Ratna	Female
2018	Mirabai Chanu	Rajiv Gandhi Khel Ratna	Female
1961	A. N. Ghosh	Arjuna Award	Male
1962	L. K. Dass	Arjuna Award	Male
1963	Kamineni Eswara Rao	Arjuna Award	Male
1965	Balbir Singh Bhatia	Arjuna Award	Male
1966	Mohon Lal Ghosh	Arjuna Award	Male
1967	Savarimuthu John Cabriel	Arjuna Award	Male
1970	Arun Kumar Dass	Arjuna Award	Male
1971	Shyamlal Salwan	Arjuna Award	Male
1972	Anil Mondal	Arjuna Award	Male
1974	S. Vellaiswamy	Arjuna Award	Male
1975	Dalbir Singh	Arjuna Award	Male
1976	K. Balamuruganandam	Arjuna Award	Male
1977–1978	M. T. Selvan	Arjuna Award	Male
1978–1979	Ekambaram Karunakaran	Arjuna Award	Male
1981	Bijay Kumar Satpathy	Arjuna Award	Male
1982	Tara Singh	Arjuna Award	Male
1983	Vispy K. Daroga	Arjuna Award	Male
1985	Mehar Chand Bhaskar	Arjuna Award	Male
1986	Jagmohan Sapra	Arjuna Award	Male
1987	G. Devan	Arjuna Award	Male
1989	Jyotsna Dutta	Arjuna Award	Female
1990	R. Chandra	Arjuna Award	Male
1990	Kunjarani Devi	Arjuna Award	Female
1991	Chhaya Adak	Arjuna Award	Female
1993	Bharati Singh	Arjuna Award	Female
1994	Karnam Malleswari	Arjuna Award	Male
1997	N. Laxmi	Arjuna Award	Female
1997	Paramjit Sharma	Arjuna Award	Male
1998	Satheesha Rai	Arjuna Award	Male
1999	Dalbir Singh	Arjuna Award	Male
2000	Sanamacha Chanu	Arjuna Award	Female
2002	Thandava Murthy Muthu	Arjuna Award	Male
2006	Geeta Rani	Arjuna Award	Female
2011	Katulu Ravi Kumar	Arjuna Award	Male
2012	Ngangbam Soniya Chanu	Arjuna Award	Female
2014	Renu Bala Chanu	Arjuna Award	Female
2015	Sathish Sivalingam	Arjuna Award	Male
2022	Vikas Thakur	Arjuna Award	Male
2010	Anita Chanu	Dhyan Chand Award	Female
1996	Pal Singh Sandhu	Dronacharya Award	Male
1999	Ajay Kumar Sirohi	Dronacharya Award	Male
2000	Hansa Sharma	Dronacharya Award	Female
2018	Vijay Sharma	Dronacharya Award	Male
