= Weightlifting at the 2002 Commonwealth Games – Women's 48 kg =

Weightlifting – Women's 48 kg at the 2002 Commonwealth Games
- Venue: Manchester International Convention Centre
- Dates: 30 July 2002
- Competitors: 7 from 6 nations
- Winning total weight: 167.5

Medalists
gold medal	Kunjarani Devi	India
silver medal	Karine Turcotte	Canada
bronze medal	Ebonette Deigaeruk	Nauru

The Women's 48 kg weightlifting event at the 2002 Commonwealth Games took place at the Manchester International Convention Centre on 30 July 2002. The weightlifter from India won the gold, lifting a total weight of 167.5 kg.

== Schedule ==
All times are Coordinated Universal Time (UTC)

Date	Time	Event
30 July 2002	15:00	Group A

== Records ==
Prior to this competition, the existing world, Commonwealth and Games records were as follows:

World record	Snatch	Wang Mingjuan (CHN)	90.0 kg	Havířov, Czech Republic	30 May 2002
World record	Clean & Jerk	Li Zhuo (CHN)	115.0 kg	İzmir, Turkey	28 June 2002
World record	Total	Wang Mingjuan (CHN)	200.0 kg	Havířov, Czech Republic	30 May 2002
Commonwealth record	Snatch	Sanamacha Chanu (IND)	82.5 kg	Bhilai, India	17 March 2002
Commonwealth record	Clean & Jerk	Kunjarani Devi (IND)	107.5 kg	Osaka, Japan	2 May 2000
Commonwealth record	Total				
Games record	Snatch	First time held			
Games record	Clean & Jerk	First time held			
Games record	Total	First time held			

The following records were established during the competition:

Snatch	75.0 kg	Kunjarani Devi (IND)	GR
Clean & Jerk	92.5 kg	Kunjarani Devi (IND)	GR
Total	167.5 kg	Kunjarani Devi (IND)	GR

== Results ==
Rank	Athlete	Nation	Group	Body weight	Snatch (kg)					Clean & Jerk (kg)					Total
Rank	Athlete	Nation	Group	Body weight	1	2	3	Result	Rank	1	2	3	Result	Rank	Total
1st place, gold medalist(s)	Kunjarani Devi	India	A	47.61	70.0	72.5	75.0	75.0	1st place, gold medalist(s)	92.5	~~100.0~~	~~100.0~~	92.5	1st place, gold medalist(s)	167.5
2nd place, silver medalist(s)	Karine Turcotte	Canada	A	47.46	62.5	67.5	70.0	70.0	2nd place, silver medalist(s)	80.0	85.0	87.5	87.5	2nd place, silver medalist(s)	157.5
3rd place, bronze medalist(s)	Ebonette Deigaeruk	Nauru	A	47.44	~~60.0~~	60.0	~~65.0~~	60.0	3rd place, bronze medalist(s)	77.5	82.5	85.0	85.0	3rd place, bronze medalist(s)	145.0
4	Kate Howard	Wales	A	46.99	47.5	50.0	~~52.5~~	50.0	4	62.5	65.0	~~67.5~~	65.0	5	115.0
5	Mary Hancock	Wales	A	46.49	42.5	45.0	47.5	47.5	5	57.5	60.0	~~62.5~~	60.0	6	107.5
–	Dika Toua	Papua New Guinea	A	47.08	~~57.5~~	~~60.0~~	~~60.0~~	–	–	75.0	~~80.0~~	~~82.5~~	75.0	4	–
–	Mercy Obiero	Kenya	A	47.91	~~50.0~~	~~50.0~~	~~50.0~~	–	–	~~65.0~~	~~65.0~~	~~65.0~~	–	–	–
