= Weightlifting at the 2006 Commonwealth Games – Women's 53 kg =

Weightlifting – Women's 53 kg at the 2006 Commonwealth Games
- Venue: Melbourne Exhibition Centre
- Dates: 17 March 2006
- Competitors: 5 from 5 nations
- Winning total weight: 188

Medalists
gold medal	Maryse Turcotte	Canada
silver medal	Dika Toua	Papua New Guinea
bronze medal	Nadeene Latif	Australia

The Women's 53 kg weightlifting event at the 2006 Commonwealth Games took place at the Melbourne Exhibition Centre on 17 March 2006. The weightlifter from Canada won the gold, lifting a total weight of 188 kg.

== Schedule ==
All times are Australian Eastern Standard Time (UTC+10)

Date	Time	Event
17 March 2006	18:30	Group A

== Records ==
Prior to this competition, the existing world, Commonwealth and Games records were as follows:

World record	Snatch	Ri Song-hui (PRK)	102 kg	Busan, South Korea	1 October 2002
World record	Clean & Jerk	Li Xuejiu (CHN)	127 kg	Warsaw, Poland	20 November 2002
World record	Total	Yang Xia (CHN)	225 kg	Sydney, Australia	18 September 2000
Commonwealth record	Snatch	Nandini Devi (IND)	87 kg	Qinhuangdao, China	10 September 2003
Commonwealth record	Clean & Jerk	Maryse Turcotte (CAN)	115 kg	Collingwood, Canada	19 May 2001
Commonwealth record	Total	Nandini Devi (IND)	200 kg	Qinhuangdao, China	10 September 2003
Games record	Snatch	Sanamacha Chanu (IND)	82 kg	Manchester, Great Britain	31 July 2002
Games record	Clean & Jerk	Sanamacha Chanu (IND)	100 kg	Manchester, Great Britain	31 July 2002
Games record	Total	Sanamacha Chanu (IND)	182 kg	Manchester, Great Britain	31 July 2002

The following records were established during the competition:

Clean & Jerk	103 kg	Dika Toua (PNG)	GR
Clean & Jerk	105 kg	Maryse Turcotte (CAN)	GR
Clean & Jerk	108 kg	Maryse Turcotte (CAN)	GR
Total	185 kg	Maryse Turcotte (CAN)	GR
Total	188 kg	Maryse Turcotte (CAN)	GR

== Results ==
Rank	Athlete	Nation	Group	Body weight	Snatch (kg)				Clean & Jerk (kg)				Total
Rank	Athlete	Nation	Group	Body weight	1	2	3	Result	1	2	3	Result	Total
1st place, gold medalist(s)	Maryse Turcotte	Canada	A	52.80	78	80	~~82~~	80	105	~~108~~	108	108	188
2nd place, silver medalist(s)	Dika Toua	Papua New Guinea	A	52.87	75	78	~~80~~	78	103	~~108~~	~~108~~	103	181
3rd place, bronze medalist(s)	Nadeene Latif	Australia	A	52.32	62	65	66	66	83	86	–	86	152
4	Clementina Agricole	Seychelles	A	52.39	~~65~~	65	67	67	~~85~~	85	~~90~~	85	152
5	Wendy Hale	Solomon Islands	A	52.95	~~60~~	60	62	62	75	80	~~84~~	80	142
