= Weightlifting at the 2002 Commonwealth Games – Women's 58 kg =

Weightlifting – Women's 58 kg at the 2002 Commonwealth Games
- Venue: Manchester International Convention Centre
- Dates: 31 July 2002
- Competitors: 4 from 4 nations
- Winning total weight: 202.5

Medalists
gold medal	Maryse Turcotte	Canada
silver medal	Michaela Breeze	Wales
bronze medal	Sunaina Sunaina	India

The Women's 58 kg weightlifting event at the 2002 Commonwealth Games took place at the Manchester International Convention Centre on 31 July 2002. The weightlifter from Canada won the gold, with a combined lift of 202.5 kg.

== Schedule ==
All times are Coordinated Universal Time (UTC)

Date	Time	Event
31 July 2002	15:00	Group A

== Records ==
Prior to this competition, the existing world, Commonwealth and Games records were as follows:

World record	Snatch	Sun Caiyan (CHN)	105.5 kg	İzmir, Turkey	28 June 2002
World record	Clean & Jerk	Sun Caiyan (CHN)	133.0 kg	İzmir, Turkey	28 June 2002
World record	Total	Sun Caiyan (CHN)	237.5 kg	İzmir, Turkey	28 June 2002
Commonwealth record	Snatch				
Commonwealth record	Clean & Jerk	Maryse Turcotte (CAN)	120.0 kg	Vancouver, Canada	20 May 2000
Commonwealth record	Total				
Games record	Snatch	First time held			
Games record	Clean & Jerk	First time held			
Games record	Total	First time held			

The following records were established during the competition:

Snatch	87.5 kg	Maryse Turcotte (CAN)	GR
Clean & Jerk	115.0 kg	Maryse Turcotte (CAN)	GR
Total	202.5 kg	Maryse Turcotte (CAN)	GR

== Results ==
Rank	Athlete	Nation	Group	Body weight	Snatch (kg)					Clean & Jerk (kg)					Total
Rank	Athlete	Nation	Group	Body weight	1	2	3	Result	Rank	1	2	3	Result	Rank	Total
1st place, gold medalist(s)	Maryse Turcotte	Canada	A	56.95	82.5	87.5	~~90.0~~	87.5	2nd place, silver medalist(s)	110.0	115.0	~~117.5~~	115.0	1st place, gold medalist(s)	202.5
2nd place, silver medalist(s)	Michaela Breeze	Wales	A	56.83	~~87.5~~	~~87.5~~	87.5	87.5	1st place, gold medalist(s)	107.5	~~112.5~~	112.5	112.5	2nd place, silver medalist(s)	200.0
3rd place, bronze medalist(s)	Sunaina Sunaina	India	A	57.31	80.0	85.0	~~87.5~~	85.0	3rd place, bronze medalist(s)	107.5	~~112.5~~	~~117.5~~	107.5	3rd place, bronze medalist(s)	192.5
–	Tyoni Batsiua	Nauru	A	57.54	~~80.0~~	~~80.0~~	~~80.0~~	–	–	~~100.0~~	~~100.0~~	~~100.0~~	–	–	–
