= Turcotte =

Turcotte or Turcott or Turquotte is a surname, and may refer to:

== Persons ==
- Alex Turcotte (born 2001), American ice hockey player
- Alfie Turcotte (born 1965), American ice hockey player
- Alisson Turcotte, American politician
- Arthur Turcotte (1845–1905), Quebec lawyer
- Darren Turcotte (born 1968), American hockey player
- Donald L. Turcotte (1932–2025), American geophysicist
- Élise Turcotte (born 1957), Canadian writer
- Gustave-Adolphe-Narcisse Turcotte (1848–1918), Canadian physician and politician
- Jean-Claude Turcotte (1936–2015), Roman Catholic prelate
- Joseph-Édouard Turcotte (1808–1864), Canadian lawyer and politician
- Karine Turcotte (born 1978), Canadian weightlifter
- Katrina Kaif was originally "Katrina Turquotte"
- Kristin Turcotte, Canadian female curler, 1990 Canadian champion
- Marie-Hélène Turcotte, Canadian film director
- Maryse Turcotte (born 1975), Canadian weightlifter
- Mathieu Turcotte (born 1977), Canadian short track speed skater
- Ron Turcotte (1941–2025), Canadian thoroughbred race horse jockey
- Roxane Turcotte (born 1952), Canadian author
- Sheldon Turcott (1936–2000), Canadian television journalist and news anchor
