= Weightlifting at the 2002 Commonwealth Games – Women's 53 kg =

2002 Commonwealth Games event

Weightlifting – Women's 53 kg at the 2002 Commonwealth Games
- Venue: Manchester International Convention Centre
- Dates: 31 July 2002
- Competitors: 6 from 4 nations
- Winning total weight: 182.5

Medalists
gold medal	Sanamacha Chanu	India
silver medal	Natasha Barker	Australia
bronze medal	Seen Lee	Australia

The Women's 53 kg weightlifting event at the 2002 Commonwealth Games took place at the Manchester International Convention Centre on 31 July 2002. The weightlifter from India won the gold, with a combined lift of 182.5 kg.

== Schedule ==
All times are Coordinated Universal Time (UTC)

Date	Time	Event
31 July 2002	15:00	Group A

== Records ==
Prior to this competition, the existing world, Commonwealth and Games records were as follows:

World record	Snatch	Yang Xia (CHN)	100.0 kg	Sydney, Australia	18 September 2000
World record	Clean & Jerk	Yang Xia (CHN)	125.0 kg	Sydney, Australia	18 September 2000
World record	Total	Yang Xia (CHN)	225.0 kg	Sydney, Australia	18 September 2000
Commonwealth record	Snatch				
Commonwealth record	Clean & Jerk	Maryse Turcotte (CAN)	115.0 kg	Collingwood, Canada	19 May 2001
Commonwealth record	Total				
Games record	Snatch	First time held			
Games record	Clean & Jerk	First time held			
Games record	Total	First time held			

The following records were established during the competition:

Snatch	82.5 kg	Sanamacha Chanu (IND)	GR
Clean & Jerk	100.0 kg	Sanamacha Chanu (IND)	GR
Total	182.5 kg	Sanamacha Chanu (IND)	GR

== Results ==
Rank	Athlete	Nation	Group	Body weight	Snatch (kg)					Clean & Jerk (kg)					Total
Rank	Athlete	Nation	Group	Body weight	1	2	3	Result	Rank	1	2	3	Result	Rank	Total
1st place, gold medalist(s)	Sanamacha Chanu	India	A	50.71	75.0	80.0	82.5	82.5	1st place, gold medalist(s)	95.0	97.5	100.0	100.0	1st place, gold medalist(s)	182.5
2nd place, silver medalist(s)	Natasha Barker	Australia	A	52.70	~~75.0~~	75.0	77.5	77.5	2nd place, silver medalist(s)	87.5	90.0	97.5	97.5	2nd place, silver medalist(s)	175.0
3rd place, bronze medalist(s)	Seen Lee	Australia	A	51.76	67.5	~~72.5~~	75.0	75.0	3rd place, bronze medalist(s)	80.0	82.5	87.5	87.5	3rd place, bronze medalist(s)	162.5
4	Kirstie Law	Scotland	A	51.81	62.5	~~65.0~~	65.0	65.0	4	77.5	~~82.5~~	~~82.5~~	77.5	5	142.5
5	Dyana Altenor	England	A	52.15	60.0	62.5	~~65.0~~	62.5	5	~~80.0~~	80.0	~~82.5~~	80.0	4	142.5
–	Jo Calvino	England	A	52.41	~~62.5~~	~~62.5~~	~~62.5~~	–	–	~~80.0~~	~~80.0~~	~~80.0~~	–	–	–
