= List of Slovak records in Olympic weightlifting =

The following are the national records in Olympic weightlifting in Slovakia. Records are maintained in each weight class for the snatch lift, clean and jerk lift, and the total for both lifts by the Slovak Weightlifting Federation (Slovenský zväz vzpierania).

== Current records ==
=== Men ===
| Event | Record | Athlete | Date | Meet | Place | Ref |
60 kg
| Snatch | 95 kg | Standard | | | | |
| Clean & Jerk | 120 kg | Standard | | | | |
| Total | 215 kg | Standard | | | | |
65 kg
| Snatch | 105 kg | Standard | | | | |
| Clean & Jerk | 125 kg | Standard | | | | |
| Total | 230 kg | Standard | | | | |
70 kg
| Snatch | 115 kg | Standard | | | | |
| Clean & Jerk | 135 kg | Standard | | | | |
| Total | 250 kg | Standard | | | | |
75 kg
| Snatch | 125 kg | Standard | | | | |
| Clean & Jerk | 150 kg | Standard | | | | |
| Total | 275 kg | Standard | | | | |
85 kg
| Snatch | 130 kg | Standard | | | | |
| Clean & Jerk | 160 kg | Standard | | | | |
| Total | 285 kg | Standard | | | | |
95 kg
| Snatch | 135 kg | Standard | | | | |
| Clean & Jerk | 175 kg | Karol Samko | 28 September 2026 | Slovak Championships | Dolný Kubín, Slovakia | |
| Total | 305 kg | Standard | | | | |
110 kg
| Snatch | 146 kg | Filip Pagáčik | 7 March 2026 | | Košice, Slovakia | |
| Clean & Jerk | 175 kg | Filip Pagáčik | 7 March 2026 | | Košice, Slovakia | |
| Total | 321 kg | Filip Pagáčik | 7 March 2026 | | Košice, Slovakia | |
+110 kg
| Snatch | 145 kg | Radoslav Tatačík | 7 March 2026 | | Košice, Slovakia | |
| Clean & Jerk | 180 kg | Standard | | | | |
| Total | 325 kg | Standard | | | | |

=== Women ===
| Event | Record | Athlete | Date | Meet | Place | Ref |
49 kg
| Snatch | 65 kg | Standard | | | | |
| Clean & Jerk | 80 kg | Standard | | | | |
| Total | 145 kg | Standard | | | | |
53 kg
| Snatch | 70 kg | Standard | | | | |
| Clean & Jerk | 85 kg | Standard | | | | |
| Total | 155 kg | Standard | | | | |
57 kg
| Snatch | 75 kg | Standard | | | | |
| Clean & Jerk | 90 kg | Standard | | | | |
| Total | 165 kg | Standard | | | | |
61 kg
| Snatch | 80 kg | Standard | | | | |
| Clean & Jerk | 96 kg | Linda Svrčková | 24 August 2026 | European Youth Championships | Pristina, Kosovo | |
| Total | 175 kg | Standard | | | | |
69 kg
| Snatch | 91 kg | Bibiána Večeřová | 27 September 2026 | Slovak Championships | Dolný Kubín, Slovakia | |
| Clean & Jerk | 115 kg | Lucia Vecelová | 19 September 2026 | European Union Cup | Bobrov, Slovakia | |
| Total | 205 kg | Bibiána Večeřová | 19 September 2026 | European Union Cup | Bobrov, Slovakia | |
77 kg
| Snatch | 95 kg | Standard | | | | |
| Clean & Jerk | 110 kg | Lucia Vecelová | 28 March 2026 | | Hlohovec, Slovakia | |
| Total | 205 kg | Standard | | | | |
86 kg
| Snatch | 102 kg | Nikola Seničová | 24 April 2026 | European Championships | Batumi, Georgia | |
| Clean & Jerk | 125 kg | Nikola Seničová | 24 April 2026 | European Championships | Batumi, Georgia | |
| Total | 227 kg | Nikola Seničová | 24 April 2026 | European Championships | Batumi, Georgia | |
+86 kg
| Snatch | 105 kg | Standard | | | | |
| Clean & Jerk | 127 kg | Lenka Žembová | 12 September 2026 | World University Championships | Doha, Qatar | |
| Total | 229 kg | Lenka Žembová | 12 September 2026 | World University Championships | Doha, Qatar | |

== Historical records ==
=== Men (2025–2026) ===
| Event | Record | Athlete | Date | Meet | Place | Ref |
71 kg
| Snatch | 115 kg | Standard | | | | |
| Clean & Jerk | 135 kg | Standard | | | | |
| Total | 250 kg | Standard | | | | |
79 kg
| Snatch | 145 kg | Sebastian Cabala | 22 April 2026 | European Championships | Batumi, Georgia | |
| Clean & Jerk | 174 kg | Sebastian Cabala | 1 November 2025 | European U23 Championships | Durrës, Albania | |
| Total | 318 kg | Sebastian Cabala | 1 November 2025 | European U23 Championships | Durrës, Albania | |
88 kg
| Snatch | 148 kg | Sebastian Cabala | 7 March 2026 | | Košice, Slovakia | |
| Clean & Jerk | 180 kg | Sebastian Cabala | 7 March 2026 | | Košice, Slovakia | |
| Total | 328 kg | Sebastian Cabala | 7 March 2026 | | Košice, Slovakia | |
94 kg
| Snatch | 145 kg | Filip Pagáčik | 2 November 2025 | European Junior Championships | Durrës, Albania | |
| Clean & Jerk | 180 kg | Karol Samko | 7 March 2026 | | Košice, Slovakia | |
| Total | 310 kg | Filip Pagáčik | 18 October 2025 | Slovak Championships | Košice, Slovakia | |

=== Men (2018–2025) ===
| Event | Record | Athlete | Date | Meet | Place | Ref |
55 kg
| Snatch | 113 kg | Standard | | | | |
| Clean & Jerk | 135 kg | Standard | | | | |
| Total | 248 kg | Standard | | | | |
61 kg
| Snatch | 120 kg | Standard | | | | |
| Clean & Jerk | 144 kg | Standard | | | | |
| Total | 264 kg | Standard | | | | |
67 kg
| Snatch | 128 kg | Standard | | | | |
| Clean & Jerk | 153 kg | Standard | | | | |
| Total | 281 kg | Standard | | | | |
73 kg
| Snatch | 141 kg | Sebastian Cabala | 19 October 2022 | European Junior Championships | Durrës, Albania | |
| Clean & Jerk | 170 kg | Sebastian Cabala | 31 May 2022 | European Championships | Tirana, Albania | |
| Total | 309 kg | Sebastian Cabala | 19 October 2022 | European Junior Championships | Durrës, Albania | |
81 kg
| Snatch | 147 kg | Sebastian Cabala | 23 September 2023 | | Raszyn, Poland | |
| Clean & Jerk | 182 kg | Karol Samko | 5 November 2018 | World Championships | Ashgabat, Turkmenistan | |
| Total | 325 kg | Sebastian Cabala | 10 December 2024 | World Championships | Manama, Bahrain | |
89 kg
| Snatch | 150 kg | Vladimír Škapec | 19 May 2024 | | Štúrovo, Slovakia | |
| Clean & Jerk | 188 kg | Karol Samko | 20 April 2023 | European Championships | Yerevan, Armenia | |
| Total | 334 kg | Sebastian Cabala | 13 October 2024 | Slovak Championships | Košice, Slovakia | |
96 kg
| Snatch | 153 kg | Standard | | | | |
| Clean & Jerk | 190 kg | Karol Samko | 12 June 2021 | | Košice, Slovakia | |
| Total | 340 kg | Standard | | | | |
102 kg
| Snatch | 163 kg | Matej Kováč | 8 November 2018 | World Championships | Ashgabat, Turkmenistan | |
| Clean & Jerk | 200 kg | Karol Samko | 19 May 2024 | | Štúrovo, Slovakia | |
| Total | 361 kg | Matej Kováč | 8 November 2018 | World Championships | Ashgabat, Turkmenistan | |
109 kg
| Snatch | 172 kg | Radoslav Tatarčík | 12 April 2019 | European Championships | Batumi, Georgia | |
| Clean & Jerk | 199 kg | Matej Kováč | 12 April 2019 | European Championships | Batumi, Georgia | |
| Total | 362 kg | Matej Kováč | 12 April 2019 | European Championships | Batumi, Georgia | |
+109 kg
| Snatch | 175 kg | Standard | | | | |
| Clean & Jerk | 209 kg | Standard | | | | |
| Total | 384 kg | Standard | | | | |

=== Men (1998–2018) ===
| Event | Record | Athlete | Date | Meet | Place | Ref |
–56 kg
| Snatch | 102 kg | Michal Palkovič | 21 June 2014 | Slovak Championships | Banská Bystrica, Slovakia | |
| Clean & Jerk | 125 kg | Michal Palkovič | 21 June 2014 | Slovak Championships | Banská Bystrica, Slovakia | |
| Total | 227 kg | Michal Palkovič | 21 June 2014 | Slovak Championships | Banská Bystrica, Slovakia | |
–62 kg
| Snatch | 125 kg | Jiří Žejdlík | 8 October 2003 | European Junior Championships | Valencia, Spain | |
| Clean & Jerk | 139 kg | Michal Beláň | 19 March 2011 | Extraliga | Hlohovec, Slovakia | |
| Total | 262 kg | Jiří Žejdlík | 8 October 2003 | European Junior Championships | Valencia, Spain | |
–69 kg
| Snatch | 142 kg | Miroslav Janíček | 8 May 2004 | Slovak Championships | Košice, Slovakia | |
| Clean & Jerk | 178 kg | Miroslav Janíček | 8 May 2004 | Slovak Championships | Košice, Slovakia | |
| Total | 320 kg | Miroslav Janíček | 8 May 2004 | Slovak Championships | Košice, Slovakia | |
–77 kg
| Snatch | 155 kg | Viktor Gumán | 25 November 1999 | World Championships | Athens, Greece | |
| Clean & Jerk | 195 kg | Rudolf Lukáč | 26 April 2002 | European Championships | Antalya, Turkey | |
| Total | 345 kg | Rudolf Lukáč | 26 April 2002 | European Championships | Antalya, Turkey | |
–85 kg
| Snatch | 160 kg | Viktor Gumán | 2 November 1999 | 1st League | Košice, Slovakia | |
| Clean & Jerk | 202 kg | Ondrej Kutlík | 28 April 2001 | European Championships | Trenčín, Slovakia | |
| Total | 362 kg | Ondrej Kutlík | 28 April 2001 | European Championships | Trenčín, Slovakia | |
–94 kg
| Snatch | 162 kg | Ondrej Kutlík | 22 October 2005 | 1st League | Dolný Kubín, Slovakia | |
| Clean & Jerk | 202 kg | Ondrej Kutlík | 22 October 2005 | 1st League | Dolný Kubín, Slovakia | |
| Total | 364 kg | Ondrej Kutlík | 22 October 2005 | 1st League | Dolný Kubín, Slovakia | |
–105 kg
| Snatch | 190 kg | Martin Tešovič | 25 April 2004 | European Championships | Kyiv, Ukraine | |
| Clean & Jerk | 227 kg | Martin Tešovič | 14 November 1998 | World Championships | Lahti, Finland | |
| Total | 412 kg | Martin Tešovič | 16 November 2005 | World Championships | Doha, Qatar | |
+105 kg
| Snatch | 185 kg | Raymond Kopka | 28 April 2002 | European Championships | Antalya, Turkey | |
| Clean & Jerk | 220 kg | Martin Tešovič | 1 October 2005 | Trenčín Cup | Trenčín, Slovakia | |
| Total | 403 kg | Martin Tešovič | 1 October 2005 | Trenčín Cup | Trenčín, Slovakia | |

=== Women (2025–2026) ===
| Event | Record | Athlete | Date | Meet | Place | Ref |
48 kg
| Snatch | 70 kg | Standard | | | | |
| Clean & Jerk | 80 kg | Standard | | | | |
| Total | 150 kg | Standard | | | | |
58 kg
| Snatch | 80 kg | Standard | | | | |
| Clean & Jerk | 95 kg | Standard | | | | |
| Total | 175 kg | Standard | | | | |
63 kg
| Snatch | 85 kg | Bibiána Večeřová | 21 April 2026 | European Championships | Batumi, Georgia | |
| Clean & Jerk | 102 kg | Bibiána Večeřová | 21 April 2026 | European Championships | Batumi, Georgia | |
| Total | 187 kg | Bibiána Večeřová | 21 April 2026 | European Championships | Batumi, Georgia | |

=== Women (2018–2025) ===
| Event | Record | Athlete | Date | Meet | Place | Ref |
45 kg
| Snatch | 67 kg | Standard | | | | |
| Clean & Jerk | 85 kg | Standard | | | | |
| Total | 152 kg | Standard | | | | |
49 kg
| Snatch | 71 kg | Standard | | | | |
| Clean & Jerk | 91 kg | Standard | | | | |
| Total | 162 kg | Standard | | | | |
55 kg
| Snatch | 78 kg | Standard | | | | |
| Clean & Jerk | 98 kg | Standard | | | | |
| Total | 176 kg | Standard | | | | |
59 kg
| Snatch | 85 kg | Standard | | | | |
| Clean & Jerk | 103 kg | Standard | | | | |
| Total | 185 kg | Standard | | | | |
64 kg
| Snatch | 87 kg | Lucia Kršková | 22 October 2023 | Slovak Championships | Štúrovo, Slovakia | |
| Clean & Jerk | 109 kg | Standard | | | | |
| Total | 196 kg | Standard | | | | |
71 kg
| Snatch | 92 kg | Standard | | | | |
| Clean & Jerk | 116 kg | Standard | | | | |
| Total | 208 kg | Standard | | | | |
76 kg
| Snatch | 96 kg | Standard | | | | |
| Clean & Jerk | 121 kg | Standard | | | | |
| Total | 217 kg | Standard | | | | |
81 kg
| Snatch | 100 kg | Standard | | | | |
| Clean & Jerk | 123 kg | Standard | | | | |
| Total | 226 kg | Standard | | | | |
87 kg
| Snatch | 105 kg | Standard | | | | |
| Clean & Jerk | 130 kg | Standard | | | | |
| Total | 235 kg | Standard | | | | |
+87 kg
| Snatch | 115 kg | Standard | | | | |
| Clean & Jerk | 141 kg | Standard | | | | |
| Total | 256 kg | Standard | | | | |

=== Women (1998–2018) ===
| Event | Record | Athlete | Date | Meet | Place | Ref |
–48 kg
| Snatch | 57 kg | Ľubica Valentová | 23 October 1999 | Women League | Trenčín, Slovakia | |
| Clean & Jerk | 70 kg | Ľubica Valentová | 23 October 1999 | Women League | Trenčín, Slovakia | |
| Total | 127 kg | Ľubica Valentová | 23 October 1999 | Women League | Trenčín, Slovakia | |
–53 kg
| Snatch | 82 kg | Dagmar Daneková | 25 April 2001 | European Championships | Trenčín, Slovakia | |
| Clean & Jerk | 102 kg | Dagmar Daneková | 25 April 2001 | European Championships | Trenčín, Slovakia | |
| Total | 185 kg | Dagmar Daneková | 25 April 2001 | European Championships | Trenčín, Slovakia | |
–58 kg
| Snatch | 85 kg | Dagmar Daneková | 2 October 1999 | 1st League | Košice, Slovakia | |
| Clean & Jerk | 107 kg | Dagmar Daneková | 2 October 1999 | 1st League | Košice, Slovakia | |
| Total | 192 kg | Dagmar Daneková | 2 October 1999 | 1st League | Košice, Slovakia | |
–63 kg
| Snatch | 85 kg | Dagmar Daneková | 25 March 2000 | 1st League | Hlohovec, Slovakia | |
| Clean & Jerk | 107 kg | Dagmar Daneková | 27 May 2000 | Slovak Championships | Košice, Slovakia | |
| Total | 192 kg | Dagmar Daneková | 27 May 2000 | Slovak Championships | Košice, Slovakia | |
–69 kg
| Snatch | 92 kg | Lucia Trojčáková | 19 April 2007 | European Championships | Strasbourg, France | |
| Clean & Jerk | 114 kg | Lucia Trojčáková | 15 March 2014 | Extraleague | Hlohovec, Slovakia | |
| Total | 205 kg | Lucia Trojčáková | 19 April 2007 | European Championships | Strasbourg, France | |
–75 kg
| Snatch | 97 kg | Lucia Trojčáková | 18 November 2006 | 1st League | Košice, Slovakia | |
| Clean & Jerk | 120 kg | Zuzana Kováčová | 10 June 2001 | | Ružomberok, Slovakia | |
| Total | 212 kg | Lucia Trojčáková | 18 November 2006 | 1st League | Košice, Slovakia | |
–90 kg
| Snatch | 97 kg | Lucia Trojčáková | 1 October 2011 | | Prague, Czech Republic | |
| Clean & Jerk | 130 kg | Zuzana Kováčová | 1 March 2003 | 1st League | Ružomberok, Slovakia | |
| Total | 225 kg | Zuzana Kováčová | 1 March 2003 | 1st League | Ružomberok, Slovakia | |
+90 kg
| Snatch | | | | | | |
| Clean & Jerk | | | | | | |
| Total | | | | | | |
