= 2001 World Weightlifting Championships – Women's 58 kg =

The 2001 World Weightlifting Championships were held in Antalya, Turkey from November 4 to November 11. The women's competition in 58 kg division was staged on 6 November 2001.

== Medalists ==
Event	Gold		Silver		Bronze	
Snatch	Marieta Gotfryd (POL)	95.0 kg	Liu Bing (CHN)	95.0 kg	Aleksandra Klejnowska (POL)	92.5 kg
Clean & Jerk	Aleksandra Klejnowska (POL)	122.5 kg	Liu Bing (CHN)	117.5 kg	Sunaina Anand (IND)	115.0 kg
Total	Aleksandra Klejnowska (POL)	215.0 kg	Liu Bing (CHN)	212.5 kg	Marieta Gotfryd (POL)	202.5 kg

== Records ==
Prior to this competition, the existing world records were as follows.

World Record	Snatch	Chen Yanqing (CHN)	105.0 kg	Athens, Greece	22 November 1999
World Record	Clean & Jerk	Ri Song-hui (PRK)	131.5 kg	Osaka, Japan	3 May 2000
World Record	Total	Chen Yanqing (CHN)	235.0 kg	Athens, Greece	22 November 1999

== Results ==
Rank	Athlete	Body weight	Snatch (kg)				Clean & Jerk (kg)				Total
Rank	Athlete	Body weight	1	2	3	Rank	1	2	3	Rank	Total
1st place, gold medalist(s)	Aleksandra Klejnowska (POL)	57.48	90.0	92.5	~~95.0~~	3rd place, bronze medalist(s)	115.0	~~122.5~~	122.5	1st place, gold medalist(s)	215.0
2nd place, silver medalist(s)	Liu Bing (CHN)	57.06	90.0	92.5	95.0	2nd place, silver medalist(s)	115.0	117.5	~~122.5~~	2nd place, silver medalist(s)	212.5
3rd place, bronze medalist(s)	Marieta Gotfryd (POL)	57.02	90.0	~~90.0~~	95.0	1st place, gold medalist(s)	~~105.0~~	105.0	107.5	7	202.5
4	Sunaina Anand (IND)	57.46	~~82.5~~	82.5	85.0	5	107.5	112.5	115.0	3rd place, bronze medalist(s)	200.0
5	Jacquelynn Berube (USA)	57.72	85.0	~~87.5~~	87.5	4	107.5	~~110.0~~	~~110.0~~	8	195.0
6	Gretty Lugo (VEN)	57.86	85.0	~~90.0~~	~~90.0~~	7	105.0	110.0	~~115.0~~	6	195.0
7	Namkhaidorjiin Bayarmaa (MGL)	57.68	82.5	~~85.0~~	~~85.0~~	9	110.0	~~115.0~~	~~115.0~~	4	192.5
8	Cemar Vásquez (VEN)	57.68	~~85.0~~	85.0	~~87.5~~	6	102.5	~~107.5~~	~~107.5~~	10	187.5
9	Svitlana Kokhanenko (UKR)	57.48	75.0	80.0	~~82.5~~	11	95.0	100.0	105.0	9	185.0
10	Olga Sablina (KAZ)	57.82	~~75.0~~	75.0	~~80.0~~	13	100.0	107.5	110.0	5	185.0
11	Abigail Guerrero (ESP)	56.98	80.0	82.5	~~85.0~~	8	95.0	100.0	~~102.5~~	11	182.5
12	Michaela Breeze (GBR)	57.02	75.0	~~80.0~~	80.0	10	90.0	95.0	~~100.0~~	12	175.0
13	Heidi Kanervisto (FIN)	57.78	72.5	75.0	77.5	12	~~90.0~~	90.0	~~95.0~~	13	167.5
14	Lisbeth Østergaard (DEN)	55.34	67.5	70.0	72.5	14	80.0	85.0	~~87.5~~	15	157.5
15	Denisse Encinas (MEX)	57.38	60.0	65.0	~~70.0~~	15	80.0	85.0	87.5	14	152.5
