= 2001 World Weightlifting Championships – Women's 53 kg =

The 2001 World Weightlifting Championships were held in Antalya, Turkey from November 4 to November 11. The women's competition in 53 kg division was staged on 5 November 2001.

== Medalists ==
| Event | Gold | | Silver | | Bronze | |
|---|---|---|---|---|---|---|
| Snatch | Li Feng-ying (TPE) | 95.0 kg | Qiu Hongxia (CHN) | 92.5 kg | Alexandra Escobar (ECU) | 90.0 kg |
| Clean & Jerk | Alexandra Escobar (ECU) | 115.0 kg | Li Feng-ying (TPE) | 115.0 kg | Qiu Hongxia (CHN) | 115.0 kg |
| Total | Li Feng-ying (TPE) | 210.0 kg | Qiu Hongxia (CHN) | 207.5 kg | Alexandra Escobar (ECU) | 205.0 kg |

== Records ==
Prior to this competition, the existing world records were as follows.

| World Record | Snatch | Yang Xia (CHN) | 100.0 kg | Sydney, Australia | 18 September 2000 |
| World Record | Clean & Jerk | Yang Xia (CHN) | 125.0 kg | Sydney, Australia | 18 September 2000 |
| World Record | Total | Yang Xia (CHN) | 225.0 kg | Sydney, Australia | 18 September 2000 |

== Results ==
| Rank | Athlete | Body weight | Snatch (kg) | | | | Clean & Jerk (kg) | | | | Total |
| Rank | Athlete | Body weight | 1 | 2 | 3 | Rank | 1 | 2 | 3 | Rank | Total |
|---|---|---|---|---|---|---|---|---|---|---|---|
| 1st place, gold medalist(s) | Li Feng-ying (TPE) | 52.48 | 90.0 | 92.5 | 95.0 | 1st place, gold medalist(s) | ~~115.0~~ | 115.0 | ~~117.5~~ | 2nd place, silver medalist(s) | 210.0 |
| 2nd place, silver medalist(s) | Qiu Hongxia (CHN) | 52.82 | 90.0 | 92.5 | ~~95.0~~ | 2nd place, silver medalist(s) | 115.0 | ~~117.5~~ | ~~120.0~~ | 3rd place, bronze medalist(s) | 207.5 |
| 3rd place, bronze medalist(s) | Alexandra Escobar (ECU) | 52.40 | 85.0 | ~~90.0~~ | 90.0 | 3rd place, bronze medalist(s) | ~~110.0~~ | 110.0 | 115.0 | 1st place, gold medalist(s) | 205.0 |
| 4 | Emine Bilgin (TUR) | 52.96 | ~~90.0~~ | 90.0 | ~~92.5~~ | 4 | ~~107.5~~ | 107.5 | ~~115.0~~ | 5 | 197.5 |
| 5 | Maryse Turcotte (CAN) | 52.82 | 80.0 | ~~85.0~~ | ~~85.0~~ | 11 | 110.0 | 112.5 | ~~117.5~~ | 4 | 192.5 |
| 6 | Mabel Mosquera (COL) | 52.74 | ~~80.0~~ | 80.0 | 85.0 | 6 | ~~102.5~~ | 102.5 | 105.0 | 7 | 190.0 |
| 7 | Nandini Devi (IND) | 52.24 | ~~80.0~~ | 80.0 | ~~82.5~~ | 9 | 100.0 | ~~105.0~~ | 105.0 | 6 | 185.0 |
| 8 | Aylin Daşdelen (TUR) | 52.48 | 80.0 | ~~85.0~~ | 85.0 | 5 | 100.0 | ~~105.0~~ | ~~105.0~~ | 9 | 185.0 |
| 9 | Dagmar Daneková (SVK) | 51.92 | ~~80.0~~ | 80.0 | ~~82.5~~ | 8 | 100.0 | 102.5 | ~~105.0~~ | 8 | 182.5 |
| 10 | Sade Okotie-Eboh (NGR) | 51.22 | 75.0 | ~~80.0~~ | 80.0 | 7 | 95.0 | ~~100.0~~ | ~~100.0~~ | 11 | 175.0 |
| 11 | Anikó Ajkay (HUN) | 52.72 | 75.0 | ~~80.0~~ | ~~80.0~~ | 13 | 100.0 | ~~105.0~~ | ~~105.0~~ | 10 | 175.0 |
| 12 | Rebeca Sires (ESP) | 52.24 | 75.0 | ~~77.5~~ | ~~80.0~~ | 12 | 95.0 | ~~100.0~~ | ~~100.0~~ | 12 | 170.0 |
| 13 | Heidi Neubacher (AUT) | 52.90 | ~~70.0~~ | 70.0 | 72.5 | 15 | 90.0 | ~~95.0~~ | ~~95.0~~ | 13 | 162.5 |
| 14 | Marina Reyes (MEX) | 52.48 | 70.0 | 72.5 | ~~75.0~~ | 14 | 80.0 | ~~85.0~~ | 85.0 | 14 | 157.5 |
| 15 | Kirstie Law (GBR) | 51.92 | 55.0 | 60.0 | 62.5 | 16 | 72.5 | ~~77.5~~ | 77.5 | 16 | 140.0 |
| 16 | Jo Calvino (GBR) | 52.66 | 60.0 | ~~62.5~~ | ~~62.5~~ | 17 | 77.5 | ~~80.0~~ | 80.0 | 15 | 140.0 |
| — | Neli Yankova (BUL) | 52.58 | ~~77.5~~ | 77.5 | 80.0 | 10 | ~~102.5~~ | ~~102.5~~ | ~~102.5~~ | — | — |
