= Pileggi =

Pileggi is an Italian surname. Notable people with the surname include:

- Arlene Pileggi (born 1966), American actress
- Caroline Pileggi (born 1977), Australian weightlifter
- Dominic Pileggi (born 1957), American politician from Pennsylvania
- Mitch Pileggi (born 1952), American actor
- Nicholas Pileggi (born 1933), American author and screenwriter
