= Jo Calvino =

British weightlifter

Personal information
- Full name: Joanne Elizabeth Calvino
- Born: 18 August 1980 (age 45)
- Weight: 47.95 kg (105.7 lb)

Sport
- Country: Great Britain
- Sport: Weightlifting
- Team: National team
- Updated on 6 September 2016

Joanne Elizabeth Calvino (born 18 August 1980) is a British female weightlifter, competing in the 48 kg category and representing England or Great Britain at international competitions. She competed at world championships, most recently at the 2011 World Weightlifting Championships.

== Major results ==
Year	Venue	Weight	Snatch (kg)				Clean & Jerk (kg)				Total	Rank
Year	Venue	Weight	1	2	3	Rank	1	2	3	Rank	Total	Rank
Representing Great Britain
World Championships
2011	Paris, France	48 kg	62	~~64~~	~~64~~	21	83	85	~~87~~	16	147	20
2002	Warsaw, Poland	53 kg	~~60.0~~	~~60.0~~	60.0	16	~~77.5~~	77.5	~~80.0~~	16	137.5	15
2001	Antalya, Turkey	53 kg	60.0	~~62.5~~	~~62.5~~	17	77.5	~~80.0~~	80.0	15	140.0	16
European Championships
2012	Antalya, Turkey	48 kg	62	64	66	11	84	~~87~~	~~88~~	10	150	10
2010	Minsk, Belarus	53 kg	66	~~69~~	~~69~~	9	86	89	91	7	157	8
2008	Lignano Sabbiadoro, Italy	53 kg	65	68	~~70~~	15	89	~~91~~	~~91~~	14	157	14
2007	Strasbourg, France	53 kg	64	~~66~~	~~66~~	14	88	~~90~~	~~90~~	13	152	14
2005	Sofia, Bulgaria	53 kg	62.5	~~65.0~~	~~65.0~~	13	85.0	~~87.5~~	~~87.5~~	11	147.5	12
2004	Kyiv, Ukraine	53 kg	~~60.0~~	~~60.0~~	60.0	15	82.5	~~85.0~~	~~85.0~~	13	142.5	13
Representing England
Commonwealth Games
2014	Glasgow, Scotland	48 kg	63	~~66~~	66	7	84	~~86~~	~~86~~	5	150	5
2010	Delhi, India	53 kg	66	~~69~~	~~69~~	8	87	90	93	4	159	5
2006	Melbourne, Australia	48 kg	62	~~64~~	64	7	~~83~~	83	~~86~~	4	147	4
2002	Manchester, England	53 kg	~~62.5~~	~~62.5~~	~~62.5~~	—	~~80.0~~	~~80.0~~	~~80.0~~	—	—	—
