= Michal Palkovič =

Michal Palkovič may refer to:

- Michal Palkovič (pathologist)
- Michal Palkovič (weightlifter)
