= Weightlifting at the 2002 Commonwealth Games – Men's 56 kg =

Weightlifting – Men's 56 kg at the 2002 Commonwealth Games
- Venue: Manchester International Convention Centre
- Dates: 30 July 2002
- Competitors: 11 from 9 nations
- Winning total weight: 260.0

Medalists
gold medal	Amirul Hamizan Ibrahim	Malaysia
silver medal	Thandava Murthy Muthu	India
bronze medal	Vicky Batta	India

The Men's 56 kg weightlifting event at the 2002 Commonwealth Games took place at the Manchester International Convention Centre on 30 July 2002. The weightlifter from Malaysia won the gold, with a combined lift of 260 kg.

== Schedule ==
All times are Coordinated Universal Time (UTC)

Date	Time	Event
30 July 2002	10:00	Group A

== Records ==
Prior to this competition, the existing world, Commonwealth and Games records were as follows:

World record	Snatch	Halil Mutlu (TUR)	138.5 kg	Antalya, Turkey	4 November 2001
World record	Clean & Jerk	Halil Mutlu (TUR)	168.0 kg	Trenčín, Slovakia	24 April 2001
World record	Total	Halil Mutlu (TUR)	305.0 kg	Sydney, Australia	16 September 2000
Commonwealth record	Snatch				
Commonwealth record	Clean & Jerk	Arumugam Pandian (IND)	147.5 kg	Vishakapatnam, India	17 January 2001
Commonwealth record	Total				
Games record	Snatch	Ponnuswamy Rangaswamy (IND)	110.0 kg	Auckland, New Zealand	January 1990
Games record	Clean & Jerk	Dharmaraj Wilson (IND)	140.0 kg	Kuala Lumpur, Malaysia	16 September 1998
Games record	Total	Ponnuswamy Rangaswamy (IND)	247.5 kg	Auckland, New Zealand	January 1990

The following records were established during the competition:

Snatch	112.5 kg	Amirul Hamizan Ibrahim (MAS)	GR
Snatch	115.0 kg	Amirul Hamizan Ibrahim (MAS)	GR
Clean & Jerk	145.0 kg	Amirul Hamizan Ibrahim (MAS)	GR
Total	250.0 kg	Amirul Hamizan Ibrahim (MAS)	GR
Total	255.0 kg	Amirul Hamizan Ibrahim (MAS)	GR
Total	260.0 kg	Amirul Hamizan Ibrahim (MAS)	GR

== Results ==
Rank	Athlete	Nation	Group	Body weight	Snatch (kg)					Clean & Jerk (kg)					Total
Rank	Athlete	Nation	Group	Body weight	1	2	3	Result	Rank	1	2	3	Result	Rank	Total
1st place, gold medalist(s)	Amirul Hamizan Ibrahim	Malaysia	A	55.85	107.5	112.5	115.0	115.0	1st place, gold medalist(s)	135.0	140.0	145.0	145.0	1st place, gold medalist(s)	260.0
2nd place, silver medalist(s)	Thandava Murthy Muthu	India	A	55.95	~~107.5~~	107.5	112.5	112.5	2nd place, silver medalist(s)	132.5	~~140.0~~	~~140.0~~	132.5	3rd place, bronze medalist(s)	245.0
3rd place, bronze medalist(s)	Vicky Batta	India	A	55.80	107.5	~~112.5~~	~~112.5~~	107.5	4	~~127.5~~	127.5	135.0	135.0	2nd place, silver medalist(s)	242.5
4	Mohamed Faizal Baharom	Malaysia	A	55.35	105.0	110.0	~~112.5~~	110.0	3rd place, bronze medalist(s)	130.0	~~135.0~~	~~135.0~~	130.0	4	240.0
5	Chinthana Vidanage	Sri Lanka	A	55.80	~~100.0~~	~~102.5~~	102.5	102.5	5	125.0	~~135.0~~	~~135.0~~	125.0	5	227.5
6	Mehmet Yağcı	Australia	A	55.85	102.5	~~107.5~~	~~107.5~~	102.5	6	~~125.0~~	125.0	~~132.5~~	125.0	6	227.5
7	Chako Daniel	Nauru	A	55.65	90.0	~~95.0~~	95.0	95.0	7	115.0	120.0	122.5	122.5	7	217.5
8	Gino Soupprayen	Mauritius	A	55.90	95.0	~~100.0~~	~~100.0~~	95.0	8	105.0	110.0	~~115.0~~	110.0	11	205.0
9	Salim Balinnya	Uganda	A	55.10	85.0	~~90.0~~	~~90.0~~	85.0	9	110.0	115.0	117.5	117.5	8	202.5
10	Obrie Nondo	Zambia	A	55.45	~~80.0~~	80.0	85.0	85.0	11	105.0	110.0	115.0	115.0	9	200.0
11	Jeffrey Robby	Papua New Guinea	A	55.45	~~85.0~~	85.0	~~90.0~~	85.0	10	~~110.0~~	110.0	~~115.0~~	110.0	10	195.0
