= Weightlifting at the 2006 Commonwealth Games – Women's 48 kg =

Weightlifting – Women's 48 kg at the 2006 Commonwealth Games
- Venue: Melbourne Exhibition Centre
- Dates: 16 March 2006
- Competitors: 11 from 11 nations
- Winning total weight: 166 kg

Medalists
gold medal	Kunjarani Devi	India
silver medal	Marilou Dozois-Prévost	Canada
bronze medal	Erika Yamasaki	Australia

The Women's 48 kg weightlifting event at the 2006 Commonwealth Games took place at the Melbourne Exhibition Centre on 16 March 2006.

== Schedule ==
All times are Australian Eastern Standard Time (UTC+10)

Date	Time	Event
16 March 2006	14:00	Group A

== Records ==
Prior to this competition, the existing world, Commonwealth and Games records were as follows:

World record	Snatch	Nurcan Taylan (TUR)	97 kg	Athens, Greece	14 August 2004
World record	Clean & Jerk	Wang Mingjuan (CHN)	118 kg	Doha, Qatar	9 November 2005
World record	Total	Wang Mingjuan (CHN)	213 kg	Doha, Qatar	9 November 2005
Commonwealth record	Snatch	Sanamacha Chanu (IND)	82 kg	Bhilai, India	17 March 2002
Commonwealth record	Clean & Jerk	Kunjarani Devi (IND)	107 kg	Osaka, Japan	2 May 2000
Commonwealth record	Total	Kunjarani Devi (IND)	190 kg	Athens, Greece	14 August 2004
Games record	Snatch	Kunjarani Devi (IND)	75 kg	Manchester, England	30 July 2002
Games record	Clean & Jerk	Kunjarani Devi (IND)	92 kg	Manchester, England	30 July 2002
Games record	Total	Kunjarani Devi (IND)	167 kg	Manchester, England	30 July 2002

The following record was established during the competition:

Clean & Jerk	94 kg	Kunjarani Devi (IND)	GR

== Results ==
Rank	Athlete	Nation	Group	Body weight	Snatch (kg)				Clean & Jerk (kg)				Total
Rank	Athlete	Nation	Group	Body weight	1	2	3	Result	1	2	3	Result	Total
1st place, gold medalist(s)	Kunjarani Devi	India	A	47.80	~~70~~	70	72	72	88	91	94	94	166
2nd place, silver medalist(s)	Marilou Dozois-Prévost	Canada	A	47.46	69	71	73	73	~~89~~	89	92	92	165
3rd place, bronze medalist(s)	Erika Yamasaki	Australia	A	47.95	66	~~69~~	69	69	82	84	~~87~~	84	153
4	Joanne Calvino	England	A	47.98	62	~~64~~	64	64	~~83~~	83	~~86~~	83	147
5	Zaira Zakaria	Malaysia	A	47.95	65	~~67~~	~~67~~	65	80	~~86~~	~~86~~	80	145
6	Suzanne Hiram	Nauru	A	47.34	62	~~65~~	~~65~~	62	~~78~~	78	~~82~~	78	140
7	Molla Shabira	Bangladesh	A	47.87	58	62	64	64	67	~~73~~	~~73~~	67	131
8	Julie Matatiken	Seychelles	A	47.51	~~55~~	55	~~61~~	55	70	~~75~~	~~75~~	70	125
9	Kathleen Hare	Papua New Guinea	A	47.59	49	53	55	55	65	69	~~71~~	69	124
–	Portia Vries	South Africa	A	47.78	~~65~~	65	~~68~~	65	~~85~~	~~85~~	~~85~~	–	–
–	Kate Howard	Wales	A	47.64	~~58~~	58	~~60~~	58	~~73~~	~~73~~	~~73~~	–	–
