= Weightlifting at the 2002 Commonwealth Games =

- Venue: GMEX
- Location: Manchester, England
- Dates: 25 July to 4 August 2002

Weightlifting at the 2002 Commonwealth Games was the 14th appearance of Weightlifting at the Commonwealth Games. The events were held in Manchester, England, from 25 July to 4 August 2002. There were eight weight classes in the men's competition and seven in the inaugural women's competition.

The weightlifting events were held at the GMEX.

For the fourth consecutive Games, the format consisted of three gold medals per weight category (snatch, clean and jerk and overall) which had been introduced in 1990. With the inclusion of women's events for the first time there were 46 gold medals available.

India topped the weightlifting medal table by virtue of winning 11 gold medals.

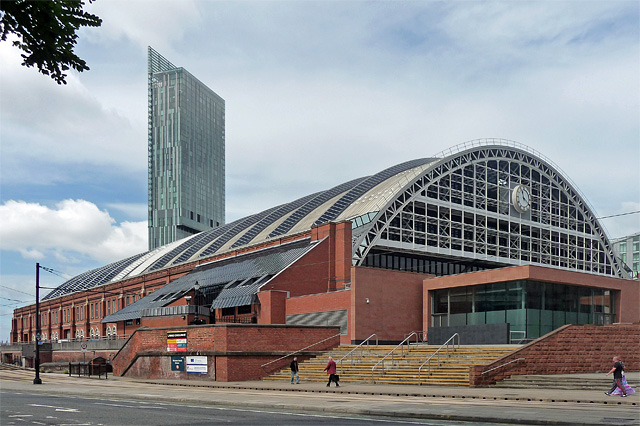
The GMEX centre in 2011

== Medal table ==
* Host nation (England)

Rank	Nation	Gold	Silver	Bronze	Total
1	India	11	9	4	24
2	Cameroon	9	0	0	9
3	Australia	8	10	8	26
4	England*	4	5	5	14
5	Canada	3	8	5	16
6	Wales	3	3	0	6
7	Malaysia	3	0	6	9
8	Nauru	2	5	8	15
9	New Zealand	2	2	4	8
10	Nigeria	1	0	0	1
11	Pakistan	0	3	0	3
12	Samoa	0	1	2	3
13	Scotland	0	0	1	1
Totals (13 entries)		46	46	43	135

== Medallists ==
=== Men ===
Event	Gold		Silver		Bronze	
56 kg snatch	Amirul Hamizan Ibrahim; Malaysia	115.0 kg	Thandava Muthu; India	112.5 kg	Mohd Faizal Baharom; Malaysia	110.0 kg
56 kg clean and jerk	Amirul Hamizan Ibrahim; Malaysia	145.0 kg	Vickey Batta; India	135.0 kg	Thandava Muthu; India	132.5 kg
56 kg total	Amirul Hamizan Ibrahim; Malaysia	260.0 kg	Thandava Muthu; India	245.0 kg	Vickey Batta; India	242.5 kg
62 kg snatch	Yurik Sarkisian; Australia	125.0 kg	Marcus Stephen; Nauru	117.5 kg	Roswadi Rashid; Malaysia	115.0 kg
62 kg clean and jerk	Yurik Sarkisian; Australia	152.5 kg	Marcus Stephen; Nauru	147.5 kg	Terry Hughes; New Zealand	135.0 kg
62 kg total	Yurik Sarkisian; Australia	277.5 kg	Marcus Stephen; Nauru	265.0 kg	Terry Hughes; New Zealand	245.0 kg
69 kg snatch	Tientchy Dabaya; Cameroon	140.0 kg	Muhammed Irfan; Pakistan	140.5 kg	Sudhir Kumar Chitradurga; India	135.0 kg
69 kg clean and jerk	Tientchy Dabaya; Cameroon	170.0 kg	Muhammed Irfan; Pakistan	170.0 kg	Muhamad Hidayat Hamidon; Malaysia	167.5 kg
69 kg total	Tientchy Dabaya; Cameroon	310.0 kg	Muhammed Irfan; Pakistan	310.0 kg	Stewart Cruickshank; England	297.5 kg
77 kg snatch	Damian Brown; Australia	147.5 kg	Dave Morgan; Wales	145.0 kg	Craig Blythman; Australia	135.0 kg
77 kg clean and jerk	Dave Morgan; Wales	160.0 kg	Renos Doweiya; Nauru	160.0 kg	Scott McCarthy; Canada	157.5 kg
77 kg total	Dave Morgan; Wales	305.0 kg	Renos Doweiya; Nauru	290.0 kg	Scott McCarthy; Canada	290.0 kg
85 kg snatch	David Matam Matam; Cameroon	155.0 kg	Anthony Arthur; England	150.0 kg	Niusila Opeloge; Samoa	142.5 kg
85 kg clean and jerk	David Matam Matam; Cameroon	185.0 kg	Ofisa Ofisa; Samoa	180.0 kg	Anthony Arthur; England	180.0 kg
85 kg total	David Matam Matam; Cameroon	340.0 kg	Anthony Arthur; England	330.0 kg	Ofisa Ofisa; Samoa	320.0 kg
94 kg snatch	Aleksander Karapetyan; Australia	167.5 kg	David Guest; England	160.0 kg	Thomas Yule; Scotland	157.5 kg
94 kg clean and jerk	Aleksander Karapetyan; Australia	197.5 kg	Julien Galipeau; Canada	192.5 kg	Karl Grant; England	187.5 kg
94 kg total	Aleksander Karapetyan; Australia	365.0 kg	David Guest; England	345.0 kg	Julien Galipeau; Canada	342.5 kg
105 kg snatch	Delroy McQueen; England	165.0 kg	Akos Sandor; Canada	165.0 kg	Gurbinder Cheema; England	160.0 kg
105 kg clean and jerk	Delroy McQueen; England	210.0 kg	Akos Sandor; Canada	195.0 kg	Edmund Yeo Thien Chuan; Malaysia	170.0 kg
105 kg total	Delroy McQueen; England	375.0 kg	Akos Sandor; Canada	360.0 kg	Edmund Yeo Thien Chuan; Malaysia	315.0 kg
105 kg+ snatch	Giles Greenwood; England	180.0 kg	Nigel Avery; New Zealand	175.0 kg	Chris Rae; Australia	175.0 kg
105 kg+ clean and jerk	Nigel Avery; New Zealand	215.0 kg	Corran Hocking; Australia	210.0 kg	Giles Greenwood; England	207.5 kg
105 kg+ total	Nigel Avery; New Zealand	390.0 kg	Giles Greenwood; England	387.5 kg	Corran Hocking; Australia	380.0 kg
Bench Press EAD (Multi-Disability)	Solomon Amarakuo; Nigeria	150.4 kg	Richard Nicholson; Australia	148.5 kg	Cheok Kon Fatt; Malaysia	380.0 kg

=== Women ===
Event	Gold		Silver		Bronze	
48 kg snatch	Kunjarani Devi Nameirakpam; India	75.0 kg	Karine Turcotte; Canada	70.0 kg	Ebonette Deigaeruk; Nauru	60.0 kg
48 kg clean and jerk	Kunjarani Devi Nameirakpam; India	92.5 kg	Karine Turcotte; Canada	87.5 kg	Ebonette Deigaeruk; Nauru	85.0 kg
48 kg total	Kunjarani Devi Nameirakpam; India	167.5 kg	Karine Turcotte; Canada	157.5 kg	Ebonette Deigaeruk; Nauru	145.0 kg
53 kg snatch	Sanamacha Chanu; India	82.5 kg	Natasha Barker; Australia	77.5 kg	Seen Lee; Australia	75.0 kg
53 kg clean and jerk	Sanamacha Chanu; India	100.0 kg	Natasha Barker; Australia	97.5 kg	Seen Lee; Australia	87.5 kg
53 kg total	Sanamacha Chanu; India	182.5 kg	Natasha Barker; Australia	175.0 kg	Seen Lee; Australia	162.5 kg
58 kg snatch	Michaela Breeze; Wales	87.5 kg	Maryse Turcotte; Canada	87.5 kg	Not awarded (only 4 entries)	
58 kg clean and jerk	Maryse Turcotte; Canada	115.0 kg	Michaela Breeze; Wales	112.5 kg	Not awarded (only 4 entries)	
58 kg total	Maryse Turcotte; Canada	202.5 kg	Michaela Breeze; Wales	200.0 kg	Not awarded (only 4 entries)	
63 kg snatch	Pascale Dorcelus; Canada	87.5 kg	Pratima Kumari; India	87.5 kg	Prasmita Mangaraj; India	85.0 kg
63 kg clean and jerk	Pratima Kumari; India	117.5 kg	Prasmita Mangaraj; India	110.0 kg	Christine Girard; Canada	100.0 kg
63 kg total	Pratima Kumari; India	205.0 kg	Prasmita Mangaraj; India	195.0 kg	Pascale Dorcelus; Canada	185.0 kg
69 kg snatch	Madeleine Yamechi; Cameroon	100.0 kg	Neelam Setti Laxmi; India	95.0 kg	Sheba Deireragea; Nauru	90.0 kg
69 kg clean and jerk	Madeleine Yamechi; Cameroon	130.0 kg	Neelam Setti Laxmi; India	110.0 kg	Sheba Deireragea; Nauru	110.0 kg
69 kg total	Madeleine Yamechi; Cameroon	230.0 kg	Neelam Setti Laxmi; India	205.0 kg	Sheba Deireragea; Nauru	200.0 kg
75 kg snatch	Shailaja Pujari; India	97.5 kg	Deborah Lovely; Australia	95.0 kg	Saree Williams; Australia	82.5 kg
75 kg clean and jerk	Shailaja Pujari; India	125.0 kg	Deborah Lovely; Australia	107.5 kg	Mary Diranga; Nauru	102.5 kg
75 kg total	Shailaja Pujari; India	222.5 kg	Deborah Lovely; Australia	202.5 kg	Saree Williams; Australia	182.5 kg
75 kg+ snatch	Caroline Pileggi; Australia	100.0 kg	Olivia Baker; New Zealand	100.0 kg	Reanna Solomon; Nauru	100 kg
75 kg+ clean and jerk	Reanna Solomon; Nauru	127.5 kg	Caroline Pileggi; Australia	125.0 kg	Olivia Baker; New Zealand	125.0 kg
75 kg+ total	Reanna Solomon; Nauru	227.5 kg	Caroline Pileggi; Australia	225.0 kg	Olivia Baker; New Zealand	225.0 kg

== See also ==
- List of Commonwealth Games medallists in weightlifting
