= Nkechi Opara =

Nigerian weightlifter (born 1995)

Personal information
- Nationality: Nigerian
- Born: 13 December 1995 (age 30) Imo State, Nigeria
- Weight: 48 kg (106 lb)

Sport
- Sport: Weightlifting
- Event: 48 kg
Medal record
Representing Nigeria
Women's weightlifting
Commonwealth Games
Bronze medal – third place	2014 Glasgow	Women's 48 kg
- Updated on 11 October 2014

Nkechi Opara (born 13 December 1995) is a Nigerian weightlifter. She competed in the women's 48 kg event at the 2014 Commonwealth Games where she won a bronze medal.
