= Gino Soupprayen =

Mauritian weightlifter

Gino Frederic Soupprayen
Personal information
- Full name: Gino Frederic Soupprayen Padiatty
- Born: 3 January 1973 (age 53)
- Height: 147 cm (4 ft 10 in)
- Weight: 52.78 kg (116.4 lb)

Sport
- Country: Mauritius
- Sport: Weightlifting
- Weight class: 56 kg
- Team: National team
- Updated on 8 October 2016

Gino Frederic Soupprayen Padiatty (born 3 January 1973) is a Mauritian weightlifter. Soupprayen would first compete at the 1996 Summer Olympics, representing Mauritius in men's weightlifting. There, he would compete in the men's flyweight category and place 21st out of the 22 competitors that participated in the event. After the Summer Games, he would compete at the 2002 Commonwealth Games and would place ninth in his event.

He would then compete at the 2000 Summer Olympics, becoming the first Mauritian weightlifter to compete at two Summer Olympics. He would compete in the bantamweight event and would place 20th out of the 22 competitors that participated in the event.

== Biography ==
Gino Frederic Soupprayen Padiatty was born on 3 January 1973. Soupprayen would first compete at the 1996 Summer Olympics in Los Angeles, United States, representing Mauritius in men's weightlifting.

At the 1996 Summer Games, he would compete in the men's flyweight category for lifters that weighed 54 kilograms or less. He would compete against 21 other competitors on 20 July. For his lifts, he would snatch a weight of 95 kilograms and clean and jerked a weight of 105 kilograms, which resulted with a total of 200 kilograms. He would place 21st overall.

He would then compete at the 2002 Commonwealth Games in Manchester, England, competing in the men's bantamweight event for lifters that weighed 56 kilograms or less. There, he would snatch a weight of 95 kilograms and clean and jerked a weight of 110 kilograms for a total of 205 kilograms. He would place eighth overall in the event.

He would compete at his next Summer Olympics at the 2000 Summer Olympics in Sydney, Australia, representing the nation in men's weightlifting. There, he would be the first Mauritian weightlifter to compete at two Summer Olympics. He would compete in the restructed men's bantamweight event, now open for lifters that weighed 56 kilograms or less. He would snatch a weight of 95 kilograms and clean and jerked a weight of 115 kilograms, which resulted in a total of 210 kilograms. He would place 20th out of the 22 competitors that competed in the event.
