= Indian Weightlifting Federation =

Sports governing body in India

- Sport: Weightlifting
- Abbreviation: IWF
- Affiliation: International Weightlifting Federation
- Regional affiliation: Asian Weightlifting Federation
- Headquarters: C-2/18, Sector – 31, Noida, Uttar Pradesh - 201301

Official website
- iwlf.in

Indian Weightlifting Federation (IWLF) is the national governing body overseeing the sport of weightlifting in India. The headquarters of the federation is in New Delhi. The Federation is affiliated to the Indian Olympic Association and is a member of Asian Weightlifting Federation and International Weightlifting Federation. The current president of IWLF is Sahdev Yadav and Anande Gowda in the general secretary .

The IWLF was formed in 1935 with Bijay Chand Mahtab of Burdwan as its first President and NN Bose, as Secretary. It was also affiliated with the Indian Olympic Association and International Weightlifting Federation in the same year. The federation sent a team to the Berlin Olympics for the first time in 1936. It was formally registered as a society on 21 November 1960.

== National events ==
- Youth
- Junior
- Senior
