= Shailaja Pujari =

Indian weightlifter (born 1982)

Personal information
- Nationality: Indian
- Born: 12 June 1982 (age 44) Andhra Pradesh, India

Sport
- Sport: Weightlifting
Medal record
Commonwealth Games
Gold medal – first place	2002 Manchester	75 kg snatch
Gold medal – first place	2002 Manchester	75 kg clean and jerk
Gold medal – first place	2002 Manchester	75 kg total

Shailaja Pujari (born 12 June 1982) is a former Indian weightlifter. Pujari competed at the 2002 Commonwealth Games where she won gold medals in the 75 kg snatch, 75 kg clean and jerk and 75 kg total events.

She was removed from India's 2006 Commonwealth Games team after testing positive for steroids and was given a lifetime ban from competing in January 2010 after testing positive for a banned substance in September 2009.
