= Prasmita Mangaraj =

Indian weightlifter (born 1977)

Personal information
- Full name: Prasmita Mangaraj
- Nationality: Indian
- Born: 4 July 1977 (age 48) Khordha, Odisha, India
- Weight: 56.02 kg (123.5 lb)

Sport
- Country: India
- Sport: Weightlifting
- Weight class: 58 kg
Medal record
Women's weightlifting
Representing India
Commonwealth Games
Silver medal – second place	2002 Manchester	63 kg total
Silver medal – second place	2002 Manchester	63 kg clean and jerk
Bronze medal – third place	2002 Manchester	63 kg snatch

Prasmita Mangaraj (born 4 July 1977) is an Indian former weightlifter from Odisha, who competed in the 58 kg category and represented India at international competitions. She competed at the 2003 World Weightlifting Championships.

== Major results ==
Year	Venue	Weight	Snatch (kg)				Clean & Jerk (kg)				Total	Rank
Year	Venue	Weight	1	2	3	Rank	1	2	3	Rank	Total	Rank
World Championships
2003	Vancouver, Canada	58 kg	82.5	~~85~~	85	18	~~105~~	~~105~~	105	19	190	18
