= Weightlifting at the 2002 Commonwealth Games – Men's 62 kg =

Weightlifting – Men's 62 kg at the 2002 Commonwealth Games
- Venue: Manchester International Convention Centre
- Dates: 30 July 2002
- Competitors: 8 from 7 nations
- Winning total weight: 277.5

Medalists
gold medal	Yurik Sarkisyan	Australia
silver medal	Marcus Stephen	Nauru
bronze medal	Terry Hughes	New Zealand

The Men's 62 kg weightlifting event at the 2002 Commonwealth Games took place at the Manchester International Convention Centre on 30 July 2002. The weightlifter from Australia won the gold, with a combined lift of 277.5 kg.

== Schedule ==
All times are Coordinated Universal Time (UTC)

Date	Time	Event
30 July 2002	18:00	Group A

== Records ==
Prior to this competition, the existing world, Commonwealth and Games records were as follows:

World record	Snatch	Shi Zhiyong (CHN)	153.0 kg	İzmir, Turkey	28 June 2002
World record	Clean & Jerk	Henadzi Aliashchuk (BLR)	181.0 kg	Antalya, Turkey	5 November 2001
World record	Total	World Standard	325.0 kg	–	1 January 1998
Commonwealth record	Snatch	Yurik Sarkisyan (AUS)	127.5 kg	Lahti, Finland	9 November 1998
Commonwealth record	Clean & Jerk	Marcus Stephen (NRU)	172.5 kg	Athens, Greece	23 November 1999
Commonwealth record	Total	Marcus Stephen (NRU)	300.0 kg	Athens, Greece	23 November 1999
Games record	Snatch	Yurik Sarkisyan (AUS)	125.0 kg	Kuala Lumpur, Malaysia	16 September 1998
Games record	Clean & Jerk	Marcus Stephen (NRU)	167.5 kg	Kuala Lumpur, Malaysia	16 September 1998
Games record	Total	Marcus Stephen (NRU)	292.5 kg	Kuala Lumpur, Malaysia	16 September 1998

== Results ==
Rank	Athlete	Nation	Group	Body weight	Snatch (kg)					Clean & Jerk (kg)					Total
Rank	Athlete	Nation	Group	Body weight	1	2	3	Result	Rank	1	2	3	Result	Rank	Total
1st place, gold medalist(s)	Yurik Sarkisyan	Australia	A	61.35	120.0	122.5	125.0	125.0	1st place, gold medalist(s)	147.5	152.5	~~155.0~~	152.5	1st place, gold medalist(s)	277.5
2nd place, silver medalist(s)	Marcus Stephen	Nauru	A	61.54	~~117.5~~	117.5	~~122.5~~	117.5	2nd place, silver medalist(s)	~~147.5~~	147.5	~~155.0~~	147.5	2nd place, silver medalist(s)	265.0
3rd place, bronze medalist(s)	Terry Hughes	New Zealand	A	61.74	105.0	110.0	~~115.0~~	110.0	4	130.0	135.0	–	135.0	3rd place, bronze medalist(s)	245.0
4	Gadd Teabuge	Nauru	A	61.43	97.5	102.5	105.0	105.0	5	120.0	127.5	132.5	132.5	4	237.5
5	Minghan Chen	Samoa	A	61.48	105.0	~~110.0~~	~~110.0~~	105.0	6	125.0	130.0	~~135.0~~	130.0	5	235.0
6	Makhosi Shabalala	Swaziland	A	61.45	82.5	85.0	~~87.5~~	85.0	7	112.5	115.0	~~117.5~~	115.0	6	200.0
–	Roswadi Abdul Rashid	Malaysia	A	61.42	115.0	~~120.0~~	~~120.0~~	115.0	3rd place, bronze medalist(s)	~~140.0~~	~~140.0~~	~~140.0~~	–	–	–
DSQ ^{1}	Krishnan Madasamy	India	A	61.50				117.5	–				150.0	–	267.5

^{1} Madasamy originally won three silver medals (at snatch, clean & jerk and total), but was disqualified after he tested positive for Nandrolone.
