= Mercy Obiero =

Kenyan weightlifter

Personal information
- Nationality: Kenyan
- Born: August 27, 1978 (age 48) Nairobi

Sport
- Sport: Weightlifting
- Weight class: 69kg

Achievements and titles
- Olympic finals: 13th (2012)
- Updated on 20 August 2016

Mercy Apondi Obiero (born 27 August 1978) is a Kenyan weightlifter.

Obiero was born in Nairobi. Obiero's brother David introduced her to weightlifting in 1999. Before then, she had played hockey. Alongside Mercy, David competed at the 2002 and 2006 Commonwealth Games.

Mercy Obiero made her international debut at the 2002 Commonwealth Games in Manchester where she missed all three of her attempts in both the snatch and the clean-and-jerk portions of the event in the 48 kg weight class. Four years later, she participated at the Commonwealth Games in Melbourne, where she finished in seventh place in the 63 kg weight class. In 2010, she competed at the Commonwealth Games in Delhi and finished in fifth position in the 69 kg weight class. Obiero competed at the 2012 Summer Olympics in London where she received an unused quota spot. Obiero finished 13th in the 69 kg category, but later was moved up to 11th position (last among completed lifters), due to disqualification of weightlifters who had placed higher failing anti-doping tests during subsequent Olympic sample re-testing. Her total was 181 kg. By competing in London, Obiero was the first Kenyan woman weightlifter at the Olympics and the second from East Africa after Uganda’s Irene Ajambo. At the 2014 Commonwealth Games in Glasgow, Obiero finished in eighth place in the women's 69 kg weight class.

By 2020, Obiero had retired from competition, and became a trainer for one of her daughters and a granddaughter.
