= Weightlifting at the 2006 Commonwealth Games – Women's 63 kg =

Weightlifting – Women's 63 kg at the 2006 Commonwealth Games
- Venue: Melbourne Exhibition Centre
- Dates: 19 March 2006
- Competitors: 7 from 6 nations
- Winning total weight: 220

Medalists
gold medal	Michaela Breeze	Wales
silver medal	Christine Girard	Canada
bronze medal	Miel McGerrigle	Canada

The Women's 63 kg weightlifting event at the 2006 Commonwealth Games took place at the Melbourne Exhibition Centre on 19 March 2006. The weightlifter from Wales won the gold, lifting a total weight of 220 kg.

== Schedule ==
All times are Australian Eastern Standard Time (UTC+10)

Date	Time	Event
19 March 2006	18:30	Group A

== Records ==
Prior to this competition, the existing world, Commonwealth and Games records were as follows:

World record	Snatch	Pawina Thongsuk (THA)	116 kg	Doha, Qatar	12 November 2005
World record	Clean & Jerk	Pawina Thongsuk (THA)	140 kg	Doha, Qatar	12 November 2005
World record	Total	Pawina Thongsuk (THA)	256 kg	Doha, Qatar	12 November 2005
Commonwealth record	Snatch	Karnam Malleswari (IND)	105 kg	Bangkok, Thailand	10 December 1998
Commonwealth record	Clean & Jerk				
Commonwealth record	Total				
Games record	Snatch	Pratima Kumari (IND)	87 kg	Manchester, Great Britain	1 August 2002
Games record	Clean & Jerk	Pratima Kumari (IND)	117 kg	Manchester, Great Britain	1 August 2002
Games record	Total	Pratima Kumari (IND)	205 kg	Manchester, Great Britain	1 August 2002

The following records were established during the competition:

Snatch	91 kg	Christine Girard (CAN)	GR
Snatch	95 kg	Michaela Breeze (WAL)	GR
Snatch	98 kg	Michaela Breeze (WAL)	GR
Snatch	100 kg	Michaela Breeze (WAL)	GR
Clean & Jerk	120 kg	Michaela Breeze (WAL)	GR
Clean & Jerk	121 kg	Christine Girard (CAN)	GR
Total	216 kg	Michaela Breeze (WAL)	GR
Total	220 kg	Michaela Breeze (WAL)	GR

== Results ==
Rank	Athlete	Nation	Group	Body weight	Snatch (kg)				Clean & Jerk (kg)				Total
Rank	Athlete	Nation	Group	Body weight	1	2	3	Result	1	2	3	Result	Total
1st place, gold medalist(s)	Michaela Breeze	Wales	A	62.12	95	98	100	100	116	120	~~122~~	120	220
2nd place, silver medalist(s)	Christine Girard	Canada	A	62.51	~~87~~	87	91	91	117	121	~~126~~	121	212
3rd place, bronze medalist(s)	Miel McGerrigle	Canada	A	62.16	85	~~90~~	~~91~~	85	105	~~110~~	~~110~~	105	190
4	Nurul Farhanah Johari	Malaysia	A	62.65	75	78	80	80	91	95	~~97~~	95	175
5	Gaëlle Nayo-Ketchanke	Cameroon	A	62.47	72	75	~~80~~	75	~~95~~	~~95~~	95	95	170
6	Annette Campbell	England	A	62.51	72	~~75~~	75	75	87	90	~~92~~	90	165
7	Mercy Obiero	Kenya	A	62.67	70	~~75~~	~~76~~	70	91	~~96~~	~~96~~	91	161
