= Khumukcham Sanjita Chanu =

Indian weightlifter (born 1994)

Personal information
- Nationality: Indian
- Born: 2 January 1994 (age 32) Kakching Khunou, Kakching district, Manipur, India
- Height: 1.50 m (4 ft 11 in) (2014)
- Weight: 48 kg (106 lb) (2014)

Sport
- Country: India
- Sport: Weightlifting
- Event: 53 kg
Medal record
Women's weightlifting
Representing India
Asian Championships
Bronze medal – third place	2011 Tongling	48 kg
Commonwealth Games
Gold medal – first place	2014 Glasgow	48 kg
Gold medal – first place	2018 Gold Coast	53 kg
Commonwealth Championships
Gold medal – first place	2012 Apia	48 kg
Gold medal – first place	2015 Pune	48 kg
Gold medal – first place	2017 Gold Coast	53 kg
- Updated on 28 January 2022

Khumukcham Sanjita Chanu (born 2 January 1994) is an Indian weightlifter. Born in Kakching Khunou, Kakching district, Manipur, she is a two time Commonwealth Games Champion. Chanu won the gold medals at the 2014 Glasgow and the 2018 Gold Coast events in the women's 48 kg and 53 kg weight category respectively. She holds the Commonwealth Games record of 84 kg for the Snatch segment in the latter weight category.

== Background ==
She was born to a Hindu Meitei family. Sanjita took up the sport weightlifting in 2006 in Manipur. She considers pioneering weightlifter and fellow Manipuri, Kunjarani Devi, her hero.

== Career ==
=== 2014 Commonwealth Games ===
Khumukcham Sanjita Chanu won a gold in women's 48kg weightlifting at the 2014 Commonwealth Games; it was India's first medal on the second day of the competition. She started with an attempt at 72 kg and later lifted 77 kg, not dropping any weight in snatch. Chanu took an unassailable lead with a 96 kg lift in the clean and jerk event to secure the gold medal with a total weight of 173 kg. Chanu's total of 173 kg missed the Games record (held by the 2010 Commonwealth Games gold medal winner Augustina Nkem Nwaokolo) by two kilograms. However, her 77 kg lift in the snatch segment equalled Nwaokolo's Commonwealth Games record.

=== 2018 Commonwealth Games ===
Chanu won her second successive gold medal at the Commonwealth Games in the 2018 edition held in Gold Coast, Australia. She had moved to a higher weight category of 53 kg and secured the title with a total lift of 192 kg, 10 kg more than second-placed Dika Toua. En route to her gold medal, she bettered her performance from 2014 Commonwealth Games and broke the Games record for the snatch category with a lift of 84 kg; she lifted a weight of 108 kg in the clean and jerk segment.

=== Doping bans ===
On 30 May, Chanu was provisionally suspended by the IWF after testing positive for testosterone. In 2020 she was cleared after the charge was dropped.

In 2023, she received a four-year ban after testing positive for a banned substance.
