= Weightlifting at the 2014 Commonwealth Games – Women's 48 kg =

Weightlifting – Women's 48 kg at the 2014 Commonwealth Games
- Venue: Clyde Auditorium
- Dates: 24 July 2014
- Competitors: 10 from 9 nations
- Winning total weight: 173 kg

Medalists
gold medal	Khumukcham Sanjita	India
silver medal	Mirabai Chanu	India
bronze medal	Nkechi Opara	Nigeria

The Women's 48 kg weightlifting event was the lightest women's event at the 2014 Commonwealth Games. The competition took place at the Clyde Auditorium on 24 July at 15:00 and was the first weightlifting event to conclude. The weightlifter from India won the gold, with a combined lift of 173 kg.

== Result ==
Rank	Athlete	Snatch (kg)				Clean & Jerk (kg)				Total (kg)
Rank	Athlete	1	2	3	Result	1	2	3	Result	Total (kg)
1st place, gold medalist(s)	Khumukcham Sanjita (IND)	72	75	77	77	~~92~~	92	96	96	173
2nd place, silver medalist(s)	Mirabai Chanu (IND)	72	~~75~~	75	75	92	95	~~98~~	95	170
3rd place, bronze medalist(s)	Nkechi Opara (NGR)	65	70	~~75~~	70	~~92~~	92	~~97~~	92	162
4	Tegan Napper (AUS)	62	65	68	68	83	87	~~91~~	87	155
5	Joanne Calvino (ENG)	63	~~66~~	66	66	84	~~86~~	~~86~~	84	150
6	Molla Shabira (BAN)	65	67	~~68~~	67	75	~~80~~	~~80~~	75	142
7	Seruwaia Malani (FIJ)	50	55	~~58~~	55	60	65	~~70~~	65	120
–	Portia Vries (RSA)	66	69	~~69~~	66	~~90~~	~~90~~	~~90~~	–	–
–	Chamari Warnakulasuriya (SRI)	~~62~~	~~63~~	~~63~~	–	–	–	-	-	–
–	Sharifah Syd Anuar (MAS)	~~70~~	~~70~~	~~70~~	–	–	–	–	-	–
