= Raymond Kopka =

British weightlifter

Personal information
- Nationality: Slovak
- Born: 20 December 1971 (age 54) Nitra, Slovakia

Sport
- Sport: Weightlifting

Raymond Kopka (born 20 December 1971) is a Slovak weightlifter. He represented Great Britain in the men's heavyweight II event at the 1992 Summer Olympics. He represented Slovakia for the first time at the 2002 European Weightlifting Championships, setting a personal best and Slovak national record of 400 kg (185 in the snatch and 215 in the clean & jerk) in the +105 kg category, for a 7th place finish. He won his first gold medal at the 2002 Slovakia National Championships shortly after, representing AŠK Dukla Trenčín and lifting a total of 375 kg in the same category.
