= Athletics at the 2002 Commonwealth Games – Women's 20 kilometres walk =

Women's 20 kilometres walk at the Commonwealth Games

The women's 20 kilometres walk event at the 2002 Commonwealth Games was held on 28 July.

== Results ==
Rank	Name	Nationality	Time	Notes
1st place, gold medalist(s)	Jane Saville	Australia	1:36:34	
2nd place, silver medalist(s)	Lisa Kehler	England	1:36:45	SB
3rd place, bronze medalist(s)	Yuan Yufang	Malaysia	1:40:00	
4	Natalie Saville	Australia	1:42:38	
5	Simone Wolowiec	Australia	1:43:10	
6	Gabrielle Gorst	New Zealand	1:44:48	
7	Niobe Menendez	England	1:46:16	
8	Sharon Tonks	England	1:49:21	
9	Sara Cattermole	Scotland	1:50:29	
	Cal Partington	Isle of Man	DNF	
