= Caroline Pileggi =

Australian weightlifter (born 1977)

Personal information
- Nationality: Australian
- Born: 12 December 1977 (age 48) Perth, Western Australia
- Height: 1.65 m (5 ft 5 in) (2002)
- Weight: 90.48 kg (199.5 lb) (2002)

Sport
- Country: Australia
- Sport: Weightlifting
Medal record
Weightlifting
Representing Australia
Commonwealth Games
| Gold medal – first place | 2002 Manchester | +75kg Snatch |
| Silver medal – second place | 2002 Manchester | +75kg Clean and Jerk |
| Silver medal – second place | 2002 Manchester | +75kg Overall |

Caroline Pileggi (born 12 December 1977) is an Australian weightlifter. She competed in the 2002 Commonwealth Games in Manchester.

Pileggi won three medals in the over 75 kg division at the 2002 Commonwealth Games in Manchester, taking the gold in the snatch event and two silvers in the clean and jerk and overall events.

On 3 June 2004, Pileggi was involved in an incident with two drug testers at a training camp in Sigatoka, Fiji. The testers, working on behalf of the Australian Sports Drug Agency, approached Pileggi while she was training at a gym, after receiving information that she would "not be very interested in undergoing a drug test". The testers claimed to an Administrative Appeals tribunal in the Federal Court that Pileggi gave them a false name and then attempted to flee, nearly hitting them with her car in the process. Pileggi claimed that the testers did not identify themselves and she had fled in fear as they pursued her. Pileggi's appeal against the charge of refusing a drug test was unsuccessful, and she was excluded from the Australian team at the 2004 Summer Olympics in Athens. She was also required to pay ASDA's court costs, and faced a two-year ban from weightlifting as mandated by the Australian Weightlifting Federation and international rules.
