= Ebonette Deigaeruk =

Nauruan weightlifter

Personal information
- Nationality: Nauruan
- Born: November 2, 1983 (age 42)

Sport
- Sport: Weightlifting
Medal record
Commonwealth Games
Bronze medal – third place	2002 Manchester	48kg snatch
Bronze medal – third place	2002 Manchester	48kg clean and jerk
Bronze medal – third place	2002 Manchester	48kg total

Ebonette Deigaeruk (born 2 November 1983) is a Nauruan weightlifter.

Deigaeruk competed at the 2002 Commonwealth Games where she won bronze medals in the 48 kg snatch, 48 kg clean and jerk and 48 kg total events. She was four time Oceania Weightlifting Championships champion at women's 48 kg event (1999, 2000, 2002 and 2003).
