= Michaela Breeze =

British weightlifter (born 1979)

Michaela Breeze MBE
Personal information
- Born: 17 May 1979 (age 47) Watford, Hertfordshire, England
Medal record
Representing Wales
Commonwealth Games
Gold medal – first place	2006 Melbourne	63 kg
Silver medal – second place	2010 Delhi	58 kg
Silver medal – second place	2002 Manchester	58 kg
Bronze medal – third place	2014 Glasgow	58 kg
Representing Great Britain
European Championships
Bronze medal – third place	2003 Loutraki	58 kg
European Junior Championships
Gold medal – first place	1999 Spala	58 kg
Bronze medal – third place	1998 Sofia	58 kg

Michaela Alica Breeze MBE (born 17 May 1979) is a British former weightlifter. Breeze was born in Watford and raised in Cornwall and educated at Wadebridge School. She started weightlifting under the guidance of PE teacher Dave Allen. Breeze then went on to Bodmin Community College before attending the University of Wales Institute, Cardiff. Breeze is well known for commentating at various events including Rio Olympics and Tokyo Olympics.

After nearly eighteen months of starting weightlifting she was put in touch with a new coach, Ken Price. She sustained a back injury in 2000, which saw her miss international competition and training for over a year.

After taking a silver at the 2010 Commonwealth Games, Breeze retired from the sport and opened a gym in Aberdare. However, she made a comeback for the 2014 Commonwealth Games, motivated by a desire to push athletes she was coaching towards qualifying for the Games themselves. Breeze won a bronze medal in the 58 kg competition, setting a new Commonwealth Games snatch record and subsequently announced her second retirement.

Breeze also taught PE at Ivybridge Community College in Devon. She was appointed Member of the Order of the British Empire (MBE) in the 2011 Birthday Honours for services to weightlifting.

== Major results ==
Year	Venue	Weight	Snatch (kg)				Clean & Jerk (kg)				Total	Rank
Year	Venue	Weight	1	2	3	Rank	1	2	3	Rank	Total	Rank
Olympic Games
2008	Beijing, China	63 kg	80	85	---	14	80	90	100	14	185	14
2004	Athens, Greece	58 kg	92.5	~~95~~	~~97.5~~	9	115	120	~~112.5~~	14	212.5	9
Commonwealth Games
2014	Edinburgh, Scotland	58 kg	91	93	~~95~~	3	108	109	~~113~~	3	202	3rd place, bronze medalist(s)
2010	Delhi, India	63 kg	90	92	~~94~~	2	~~110~~	110	~~113~~	2	202	2nd place, silver medalist(s)
2006	Melbourne, Australia	63 kg	95	98	100	1	116	120	~~122~~	2	220	1st place, gold medalist(s)
2002	Manchester, England	58 kg	~~87.5~~	~~87.5~~	87.5	1st place, gold medalist(s)	107.5	~~112.5~~	112.5	2nd place, silver medalist(s)	200	2nd place, silver medalist(s)
World Championships
2007	Chang Mai, Thailand	63 kg	~~97~~	~~97~~	97	9	118	~~121~~	~~121~~	11	215	10
2003	Vancouver, Canada	58 kg	87.5	~~90~~	~~90~~	13	~~107.5~~	~~107.5~~	107.5	17	195	16
2002	Warsaw, Poland	58 kg	87.5	92.5	~~95~~	4	~~107.5~~	107.5	112.5	6	205	5
2001	Antalya, Turkey	58 kg	75	~~80~~	80	10	90	95	~~100~~	12	175	12
1999	Piraeus, Greece	58 kg	80	82.5	~~85~~	14	100	102.5	~~105~~	18	185	15
European Championships
2008	Lignano Sabbiadoro, Italy	63 kg	96	99	~~101~~	6	117	~~120~~	120	5	219	5
2006	Wladyslawowo, Poland	63 kg	95	~~98~~	98	3rd place, bronze medalist(s)	117	120	122	4	220	4
2005	Sofia, Bulgaria	63 kg	92.5	95	97.5	3rd place, bronze medalist(s)	~~115~~	115	~~120~~	5	212.5	4
2004	Kyiv, Ukraine	58 kg	92.5	~~95~~	~~95~~	4	112.5	117.5	120	5	212.5	4
2003	Loutraki, Greece	58 kg	90	~~92.5~~	~~92.5~~	4	112.5	~~115~~	~~115~~	3rd place, bronze medalist(s)	202.5	3rd place, bronze medalist(s)
2002	Antalya, Turkey	58 kg	80	85	~~87.5~~	6	102.5	107.5	~~110~~	5	192.5	6
1999	La Coruna, Spain	58 kg	72.5	77.5	~~80~~	6	92.5	97.5	~~100~~	7	175	6
1998	Riesa, Germany	58 kg	70	72.5	~~75~~	8	87.5	92.5	~~95~~	6	165	7
World Junior Championships
1999	Savannah, Georgia, United States	58 kg	75	77.5	80	5	95	100	~~102.5~~	3rd place, bronze medalist(s)	180	4
1998	Sofia, Bulgaria	58 kg	70	75	~~77.5~~	3rd place, bronze medalist(s)	87.5	~~92.5~~	92.5	6	167.5	5
European Junior Championships
1999	Spala, Poland	58 kg	77.5	80	82.5	1st place, gold medalist(s)	97.5	~~100~~	100	2nd place, silver medalist(s)	182.5	1st place, gold medalist(s)
1998	Sofia, Bulgaria	58 kg	70	75	~~77.5~~	3rd place, bronze medalist(s)	90	~~92.5~~	~~92.5~~	3rd place, bronze medalist(s)	165	3rd place, bronze medalist(s)

== Career achievements ==
- Bronze medal in the Clean and Jerk at the World Junior Championships held in Savannah, USA in 1999.
- Winning the European Junior title in Poland in 1999.
- Gold in the snatch and silvers in the Clean and Jerk and combined total at the 2002 Commonwealth Games in Manchester.
- Bronze medal in the 58 kg class at the European Senior Championships in Greece in 2003.
- 9th position in the 58 kg class of the 2004 Summer Olympics.
- Gold medal in the 2006 Commonwealth Games.
- 10th position in the 63 kg category at the 2007 World Weightlifting Championships.
- 5th position in the 63 kg category at the 2008 European Weightlifting Championships.
- 14th position in the 63 kg category of the 2008 Summer Olympics.
- Won a silver medal at 2010 Commonwealth Games held in Delhi, India in the Women's 63 kg Category.
- Won a bronze medal at 2014 Commonwealth Games held in Glasgow, Scotland.

== Personal life ==
Breeze married Welsh netball representative Sinead Kelly in May 2015.
