= Sunaina Anand =

Indian weightlifter

Personal information
- Nationality: Indian
- Born: 20 April 1980 (age 46)

Sport
- Sport: Weightlifting
Medal record
Commonwealth Games
Bronze medal – third place	2002 Manchester	58 kg snatch
Bronze medal – third place	2002 Manchester	58 kg clean and jerk
Bronze medal – third place	2002 Manchester	58 kg total

Sunaina Anand (20 April 1980) is an Indian weightlifter.

Sunaina won three bronze medals at the 2002 Commonwealth Games in the 58 kg snatch, 58 kg clean and jerk and 58 kg total events.
