= Irina Maharani =

Malaysian sport shooter

Personal information
- Nationality: Malaysian
- Born: December 25, 1961 (age 64)

Sport
- Sport: Shooting

Irina Maharani (born 25 December 1961) is a Malaysian sport shooter. She tied for 32nd place in the women's 10 metre air pistol event and placed 36th in the women's 25 metre pistol event at the 2000 Summer Olympics.
