= Dagmar Daneková =

Slovak weightlifter (born 1978)

Personal information
- Full name: Dagmar Danekova
- Born: 20 February 1978 (age 48) Žilina, Czechoslovakia
- Height: 163 cm (5 ft 4 in)
- Weight: 51.92 kg (114.5 lb)

Sport
- Country: Slovakia
- Sport: Weightlifting
- Weight class: 53 kg
- Team: National team
- Updated on 27 September 2016

Dagmar Danekova (born 20 February 1978 in Žilina) is a Slovak weightlifter, competing in the 53 kg category and representing Slovakia at international competitions.

She participated at the 2000 Summer Olympics in the 58 kg event. She competed at world championships, most recently at the 2001 World Weightlifting Championships.

== Major results ==
Year	Venue	Weight	Snatch (kg)				Clean & Jerk (kg)				Total	Rank
Year	Venue	Weight	1	2	3	Rank	1	2	3	Rank	Total	Rank
Summer Olympics
2000	Sydney, Australia	58 kg				—N/a				—N/a		9
World Championships
2001	Antalya, Turkey	53 kg	~~80~~	80	~~82.5~~	8	100	102.5	~~105~~	8	182.5	9
1999	Piraeus, Greece	58 kg	80	85	~~87.5~~	9	102.5	~~107.5~~	~~107.5~~	17	187.5	12
1998	Lahti, Finland	53 kg	~~72.5~~	72.5	~~75~~	5	92.5	~~95~~	~~97.5~~	6	165	6
