= Jacquelynn Berube =

American weightlifter (born 1971)

Personal information
- Born: December 9, 1971 (age 54) Colorado Springs, Colorado, United States

Sport
- Sport: Weightlifting

Jacquelynn Ann Berube (born December 9, 1971) is an American weightlifter who competed in the women's 58 kg at the 2005 World Championships in Doha, Qatar and reached the 7th spot with 198 kg in total.

== Education ==
Berube obtained her bachelor's degree from the University of Wisconsin–La Crosse and her master's degree in biology from the University of Colorado. During her time at the University of Wisconsin–La Crosse, Berube became an Academic All-American gymnast. She also competed on the varsity men's wrestling team in the 118 pound weight class.

== Clubs ==
- Pinnacle Weightlifting

== About ==
Berube competed in weightlifting competitions at 58 kg standing at 5 feet tall. She was coached by Zygmunt Smalcez. After she graduated from college, Berube wrestled on the USA Women's National Wrestling Team where she won a silver medal at the World Championships in 1996. Two years later, she became the strength and conditioning coach at Northwestern University and focused all of her attention on weightlifting. Prior to the 2006 World Weightlifting Championships, Berube had a weight fall on her leg and it ruptured her quad. Soon after, she competed in the Dominican Republic and took 11th place. Berube had surgery to help her ruptured quad. After her quad healed, she competed in the Pan American Games in Rio de Janeiro, Brazil. Berube's favorite competition lift is the snatch and her favorite training lift is the squat.

== Sources ==
- Weightlifting Exchange http://weightliftingexchange.com/index.php?option=com_content&task=view&id=94&Itemid=85
