= Michal Palkovič (weightlifter) =

Slovak weightlifter

Personal information
- Full name: Michal Palkovič
- Born: 28 October 1985 (age 40)
- Weight: 55.58 kg (122.5 lb)

Sport
- Country: Slovakia
- Sport: Weightlifting
- Weight class: 56 kg
- Updated on 12 November 2016

Michal Palkovič (born 28 October 1985) is a Slovak male weightlifter, who competed in the 56 kg category and represented Slovakia at international competitions. Palkovič has competed at various European Weightlifting Championships ranging from 2008 to 2016.

== Major results ==
Year	Venue	Weight	Snatch (kg)				Clean & Jerk (kg)				Total	Rank
Year	Venue	Weight	1	2	3	Rank	1	2	3	Rank	Total	Rank
European Weightlifting Championships
2008		56 kg	88	92	97	10	110	120	~~125~~	9	217	9
2009		56 kg	~~94~~	94	~~98~~	---	115	~~119~~	121	---	215	17
2012		56 kg	85	90	92	10	103	108	113	11	205	11
2016	Førde, Norway	56 kg	82	~~86~~	86	11	102	107	111	11	197	11

== See also ==
- 2016 European Weightlifting Championships
