= Karine Turcotte =

Canadian weightlifter

Personal information
- Nationality: Canadian
- Born: August 28, 1978 (age 47)

Sport
- Sport: Weightlifting
Medal record
Commonwealth Games
Silver medal – second place	2002 Manchester	48kg snatch
Silver medal – second place	2002 Manchester	48kg clean and jerk
Silver medal – second place	2002 Manchester	48kg total

Karine Turcotte (born 28 August 1978) is a Canadian weightlifter.

Turcotte competed at the 2002 Commonwealth Games where she won silver medals in the 48 kg snatch, clean and jerk and total events. She also competed at the 2001 World Weightlifting Championships in the 48 kg event.

Her sister, Maryse Turcotte, is also a weightlifter.
