= Amirul Hamizan Ibrahim =

Malaysian weightlifter (born 1981)

Medal record

Men's weightlifting

Representing Malaysia

Commonwealth Games
Gold medal – first place	2002 Manchester	56 kg (Snatch)
Gold medal – first place	2002 Manchester	56 kg (Clean & Jerk)
Gold medal – first place	2002 Manchester	56 kg (Total)
Gold medal – first place	2010 Delhi	56 kg

Amirul Hamizan bin Ibrahim (born 3 December 1981) is a Malaysian weightlifter.

He won three gold medals in the 56-kilogram category at the 2002 Commonwealth Games in Manchester.

At the 2008 Asian Championships he ranked 4th in the 56 kg category, with a total of 262 kg.

He competed in Weightlifting at the 2008 Summer Olympics in the 56 kg division finishing eighth, with a new personal best of 265 kg. He beat his previous best by 3 kg.

He is 5 ft 3 inches tall.

== Controversy ==
In June 2005, Amirul Hamizan Ibrahim tested positive for banned substance namely steroids in an out-of-competition test conducted by the National Sports Council of Malaysia and faced a ban of two years.

== Honours ==
=== Honours of Malaysia ===
- Malaysia
  - Member of the Order of the Defender of the Realm (AMN) (2004)
  - Medallist of the Order of the Defender of the Realm (PPN) (2003)
