= Kunjarani Devi =

Indian weightlifter (born 1966)

Personal information
- Full name: Nameirakpam Devi Kunjarani
- Nickname: Nameirakpam Jani Devi
- Nationality: Indian
- Born: 1 March 1966 (age 60) Imphal, Manipur, India
- Height: 148 cm (4 ft 10 in)
- Weight: 48 kg (106 lb)

Sport
- Country: India
- Sport: Weightlifting
- Weight class: 48 kg
- Team: National team
Medal record
Representing India
World Championships
Silver medal – second place	1989 Manchester	44 kg
Silver medal – second place	1991 Donaueschingen	44 kg
Silver medal – second place	1992 Varna	44 kg
Silver medal – second place	1994 Istanbul	46 kg
Silver medal – second place	1995 Warsaw	46 kg
Silver medal – second place	1996 Guangzhou	46 kg
Silver medal – second place	1997 Chiang Mai	46 kg
Asian Games
Bronze medal – third place	1990 Beijing	44 kg
Bronze medal – third place	1994 Hiroshima	46 kg
Commonwealth Games
Gold medal – first place	2002 Manchester	48 kg
Gold medal – first place	2006 Melbourne	48 kg

Nameirakpam Kunjarani Devi (born 1 March 1966) is an Indian weightlifter. She is among the most decorated Indian sportswoman in weightlifting.

== Background ==
Devi was born on 1 March 1968 at Kairang Mayai Leikai in Imphal, to a Hindu Meitei family. She started taking interest in sports while still in Imphal's Sindam Sinshang Resident High School in 1978. By the time she finished her graduation from Maharaja Bodha Chandra College in Imphal, weightlifting had become her first choice.

She joined the Central Reserve Police Force. She also went on to make waves in the Police Championships and captained the Indian Police team from 1996 to 1998.

== Sporting history ==
Beginning 1985, she started winning medals, mostly gold, in the National Weightlifting Championships in 44-kilogram, 46-kilogram and 48-kilogram, the latter her final weight category. She created two new national records in Trivandrum in 1987. Changing her weight category to 46-kilogram she claimed a gold in Pune in 1994 but was relegated to silver when she tried to compete in the 48-kilogram class four years later in Manipur.

Her first World Women's Weightlifting Championship was the Manchester edition in 1989 and the reward of three silver medals buoyed her spirits considerably. Since then she has taken part in seven successive World Championships and with the exception of the Melbourne edition in 1993, she has won medals at every one of those competitions. However, she however could not get to the top spot, having always to be content with silver medals.

A bronze medal was the most she managed in the Asian Games at Beijing in 1990 and Hiroshima in 1994, and she failed to secure any medal in the 1998 edition of the Asian Games at Bangkok.

Kunjarani has had better luck in the Asian Weightlifting Championships to which she has been a regular visitor. Starting with one silver and two bronze medals in the 1989 edition in Shanghai, she progressed to three silver medals in the 44-kilogram class in the 1991 edition in Indonesia. She retained her second spot in the next one in Thailand in 1992 and China in 1993. Her best performance came in the 1995 competition in South Korea where she won two gold and one bronze in the 46-kilogram category. In 1996 she settled for two silver and one bronze in the championship held in Japan.

== Recognition ==
She was a recipient of the Arjuna Award in 1990 and shared the Rajiv Gandhi Khel Ratna award with Leander Paes for the year 1996–1997. In the same year she also won the K.K. Birla sports award. The Government of India awarded her the civilian honour of Padma Shri in 2011.

She has more than fifty international medals to her credit. She also won a gold medal at the 2006 Commonwealth Games held in Melbourne for 48 kg women's weightlifting with a Games record with an overall lift of 166 kg which included 72 kg in snatch and 94 kg in the clean and jerk.

== Current status ==
N.Kunjarani Devi holds the rank of a "Commandant" and nodal officer of Central sports team in the Central Reserve Police Force (CRPF). She was a member of the committee which was to recommend the Rajiv Gandhi Khel Ratna Award and Arjuna Award for the year 2014. She also was the coach of the Indian women's weightlifting team in Commonwealth Games 2014 in Glasgow.

== Major results ==
Year	Venue	Weight	Snatch (kg)				Clean & Jerk (kg)				Total	Rank
Year	Venue	Weight	1	2	3	Rank	1	2	3	Rank	Total	Rank
World Championships
2005	Doha, Qatar	48 kg	75	78	~~79~~	7	95	98	100	7	178.0	7
2003	Vancouver, Canada	48 kg	75	77.5	80	6	97.5	102.5	~~105~~	4	182.5	5
1999	Piraeus, Greece	48 kg	75	~~80~~	~~80~~	10	95	100	105	2nd place, silver medalist(s)	180	5

== Extra links ==
- Profile on Athens-website
- Bio on Ministry of Sports webpage
- Brief Introduction to N Kunjarani Devi
