= Maryse Turcotte =

Canadian weightlifter (born 1975)

Personal information
- Born: February 23, 1975 (age 51) Sherbrooke, Quebec
Medal record
Women's Weightlifting
Representing Canada
Pan American Games
Gold medal – first place	1999 Winnipeg	– 58 kg
Commonwealth Games
Gold medal – first place	2002 Manchester	– 58 kg
Gold medal – first place	2006 Melbourne	– 53 kg

Maryse Turcotte (born February 23, 1975, in Sherbrooke, Quebec) is a retired female weightlifter from Canada, who competed for Canada at the Summer Olympics in 2000 and 2004. She is a two-time gold medallist at the Commonwealth Games. She won a gold medal in the women's – 53 kg division at the 1999 Pan American Games in Winnipeg, Manitoba. She currently works as a physician.

Her sister, Karine Turcotte, is also a weightlifter.
