= Sanamacha Chanu =

Indian weightlifter (born 1975)

Personal information
- Full name: Sanamacha Thingbaijam Chanu
- Born: 1 February 1975 (age 51) Manipur, India
- Weight: 52.74 kg (116.3 lb)

Sport
- Country: India
- Sport: Weightlifting
- Weight class: 53 kg
- Team: National team
- Updated on 13 September 2016

Sanamacha Thingbaijam Chanu (born 1 February 1975) is an Indian weightlifter who competed in the women's 53 kg weight class at the 2004 Summer Olympics. She had also won three golds at the 2002 Commonwealth Games in Manchester and was a part of the core team for the 2010 Commonwealth Games at New Delhi, during the trials for which, she was tested positive for methylhexanamine; a stimulant commonly used as a nasal decongestant.

== Major results ==
Year	Venue	Weight	Snatch (kg)				Clean & Jerk (kg)				Total	Rank
Year	Venue	Weight	1	2	3	Rank	1	2	3	Rank	Total	Rank
World Championships
2003	Vancouver, Canada	53 kg	77.5	80	82.5	9	102.5	107.5	~~110~~	7	190	7
1999	Piraeus, Greece	48 kg	~~75~~	~~75~~	~~75~~	---	90	~~95~~	~~95~~	15	0	---

== See also ==
- List of sportspeople sanctioned for doping offences
