= 1972 World Weightlifting Championships =

International weightlifting competition

1972 Men's World Championships
- Host city: Munich, West Germany
- Dates: 27 August-6 September 1972

The 1972 Men's World Weightlifting Championships were held in Munich, West Germany from August 27 to September 6, 1972. There were 188 men in action from 54 nations.

This tournament was a part of 1972 Summer Olympics but counted as World Weightlifting Championships too. Only total medals counted for Olympic Games while Snatch and Clean & Jerk medals counted for the World Weightlifting Championships.

== Medal summary ==
Event	Gold		Silver		Bronze	
52 kg
Press	Zygmunt Smalcerz; Poland	112.5 kg	Sándor Holczreiter; Hungary	112.5 kg	Lajos Szűcs; Hungary	107.5 kg
Snatch	Aung Gyi; Burma	105.0 kg WR	Zygmunt Smalcerz; Poland	100.0 kg	Tetsuhide Sasaki; Japan	97.5 kg
Clean & Jerk	Pak Dong-geun; North Korea	130.0 kg	Lajos Szűcs; Hungary	127.5 kg	Zygmunt Smalcerz; Poland	125.0 kg
Total	Zygmunt Smalcerz; Poland	337.5 kg	Lajos Szűcs; Hungary	330.0 kg	Sándor Holczreiter; Hungary	327.5 kg
56 kg
Press	Imre Földi; Hungary	127.5 kg	Mohammad Nassiri; Iran	127.5 kg	Henryk Trębicki; Poland	122.5 kg
Snatch	Koji Miki; Japan	112.5 kg	Gennady Chetin; Soviet Union	107.5 kg	Henryk Trębicki; Poland	107.5 kg
Clean & Jerk	Imre Földi; Hungary	142.5 kg	Mohammad Nassiri; Iran	142.5 kg	Gennady Chetin; Soviet Union	140.0 kg
Total	Imre Földi; Hungary	377.5 kg WR	Mohammad Nassiri; Iran	370.0 kg	Gennady Chetin; Soviet Union	367.5 kg
60 kg
Press	Ymer Pampuri; Albania	127.5 kg	Dito Shanidze; Soviet Union	127.5 kg	Norair Nurikyan; Bulgaria	127.5 kg
Snatch	Jan Wojnowski; Poland	120.0 kg	Yoshinobu Miyake; Japan	120.0 kg	Dito Shanidze; Soviet Union	120.0 kg
Clean & Jerk	Norair Nurikyan; Bulgaria	157.5 kg WR	Dito Shanidze; Soviet Union	152.5 kg	Yoshinobu Miyake; Japan	145.0 kg
Total	Norair Nurikyan; Bulgaria	402.5 kg	Dito Shanidze; Soviet Union	400.0 kg	János Benedek; Hungary	390.0 kg
67.5 kg
Press	Mladen Kuchev; Bulgaria	157.5 kg WR	Nasrollah Dehnavi; Iran	150.0 kg	Mukharby Kirzhinov; Soviet Union	147.5 kg
Snatch	Mukharby Kirzhinov; Soviet Union	135.0 kg	Waldemar Baszanowski; Poland	130.0 kg	Won Shin-hee; South Korea	130.0 kg
Clean & Jerk	Mukharby Kirzhinov; Soviet Union	177.5 kg WR	Mladen Kuchev; Bulgaria	167.5 kg	Zbigniew Kaczmarek; Poland	167.5 kg
Total	Mukharby Kirzhinov; Soviet Union	460.0 kg WR	Mladen Kuchev; Bulgaria	450.0 kg	Zbigniew Kaczmarek; Poland	437.5 kg
75 kg
Press	Vladimir Kanygin; Soviet Union	165.0 kg	Mohamed Tarabulsi; Lebanon	160.0 kg	Yordan Bikov; Bulgaria	160.0 kg
Snatch	Ondrej Hekel; Czechoslovakia	142.5 kg	Aimé Terme; France	142.5 kg	Mohamed Tarabulsi; Lebanon	140.0 kg
Clean & Jerk	Yordan Bikov; Bulgaria	185.0 kg	Gábor Szarvas; Hungary	175.0 kg	Anselmo Silvino; Italy	175.0 kg
Total	Yordan Bikov; Bulgaria	485.0 kg WR	Mohamed Tarabulsi; Lebanon	472.5 kg	Anselmo Silvino; Italy	470.0 kg
82.5 kg
Press	Leif Jenssen; Norway	172.5 kg	Christos Iakovou; Greece	170.0 kg	Rolf Milser; West Germany	160.0 kg
Snatch	Leif Jenssen; Norway	150.0 kg	Bernhard Radtke; East Germany	145.0 kg	Mike Karchut; United States	145.0 kg
Clean & Jerk	György Horváth; Hungary	192.5 kg	Norbert Ozimek; Poland	187.5 kg	Leif Jenssen; Norway	185.0 kg
Total	Leif Jenssen; Norway	507.5 kg	Norbert Ozimek; Poland	497.5 kg	György Horváth; Hungary	495.0 kg
90 kg
Press	David Rigert; Soviet Union	187.5 kg	Hans Bettembourg; Sweden	182.5 kg	Andon Nikolov; Bulgaria	180.0 kg
Snatch	Andon Nikolov; Bulgaria	155.0 kg	Jaakko Kailajärvi; Finland	150.0 kg	Pierre Gourrier; France	147.5 kg
Clean & Jerk	Rick Holbrook; United States	197.5 kg	Phil Grippaldi; United States	195.0 kg	Atanas Shopov; Bulgaria	192.5 kg
Total	Andon Nikolov; Bulgaria	525.0 kg	Atanas Shopov; Bulgaria	517.5 kg	Hans Bettembourg; Sweden	512.5 kg
110 kg
Press	Jaan Talts; Soviet Union	210.0 kg	Aleksandar Kraychev; Bulgaria	197.5 kg	Roberto Vezzani; Italy	192.5 kg
Snatch	Rainer Dörrzapf; West Germany	165.0 kg	Kauko Kangasniemi; Finland	165.0 kg	Jaan Talts; Soviet Union	165.0 kg
Clean & Jerk	Stefan Grützner; East Germany	207.5 kg	Helmut Losch; East Germany	205.0 kg	Jaan Talts; Soviet Union	205.0 kg
Total	Jaan Talts; Soviet Union	580.0 kg	Aleksandar Kraychev; Bulgaria	562.5 kg	Stefan Grützner; East Germany	555.0 kg
+110 kg
Press	Vasily Alekseyev; Soviet Union	235.0 kg	Rudolf Mang; West Germany	225.0 kg	Ken Patera; United States	212.5 kg
Snatch	Vasily Alekseyev; Soviet Union	175.0 kg	Rudolf Mang; West Germany	170.0 kg	Kalevi Lahdenranta; Finland	165.0 kg
Clean & Jerk	Vasily Alekseyev; Soviet Union	230.0 kg	Gerd Bonk; East Germany	217.5 kg	Rudolf Mang; West Germany	215.0 kg
Total	Vasily Alekseyev; Soviet Union	640.0 kg	Rudolf Mang; West Germany	610.0 kg	Gerd Bonk; East Germany	572.5 kg

== Medal table ==
Ranking by Big (Total result) medals

Rank	Nation	Gold	Silver	Bronze	Total
1	Bulgaria	3	3	0	6
2	Soviet Union	3	1	1	5
3	Hungary	1	1	3	5
4	Poland	1	1	1	3
5	Norway	1	0	0	1
6	Iran	0	1	0	1
6	Lebanon	0	1	0	1
6	West Germany	0	1	0	1
9	East Germany	0	0	2	2
10	Italy	0	0	1	1
10	Sweden	0	0	1	1
Totals (11 entries)		9	9	9	27

Ranking by all medals: Big (Total result) and Small (Press, Snatch and Clean & Jerk)

Rank	Nation	Gold	Silver	Bronze	Total
1	Soviet Union	11	4	6	21
2	Bulgaria	7	5	4	16
3	Hungary	4	4	4	12
4	Poland	3	4	5	12
5	Norway	3	0	1	4
6	East Germany	1	3	2	6
6	West Germany	1	3	2	6
8	Japan	1	1	2	4
8	United States	1	1	2	4
10	Albania	1	0	0	1
10	Burma	1	0	0	1
10	Czechoslovakia	1	0	0	1
10	North Korea	1	0	0	1
14	Iran	0	4	0	4
15	Finland	0	2	1	3
15	Lebanon	0	2	1	3
17	France	0	1	1	2
17	Sweden	0	1	1	2
19	Greece	0	1	0	1
20	Italy	0	0	3	3
21	South Korea	0	0	1	1
Totals (21 entries)		36	36	36	108

== See also ==
- Weightlifting at the 1972 Summer Olympics
