= Weightlifting at the 1972 Summer Olympics =

Weightlifting at the Games of the XX Olympiad
- Venue: Messegelände
- Dates: 27 August – 6 September 1972
- Competitors: 188 from 54 nations

The weightlifting competition at the 1972 Summer Olympics in Munich consisted of nine weight classes, all for men only. Two new weight classes were introduced at these Games (flyweight and super heavyweight), marking the first changes to the Olympic program since 1952. This was the last year that the clean and press was included as one of the lifts.

== Medal summary ==
Games	Gold	Silver	Bronze
52 kg	Zygmunt Smalcerz; Poland	Lajos Szűcs; Hungary	Sándor Holczreiter; Hungary
56 kg	Imre Földi; Hungary	Mohammad Nassiri; Iran	Gennadi Chetin; Soviet Union
60 kg	Norair Nurikyan; Bulgaria	Dito Shanidze; Soviet Union	János Benedek; Hungary
67.5 kg	Mukharby Kirzhinov; Soviet Union	Mladen Kutchev; Bulgaria	Zbigniew Kaczmarek; Poland
75 kg	Yordan Bikov; Bulgaria	Mohamed Traboulsi; Lebanon	Anselmo Silvino; Italy
82.5 kg	Leif Jenssen; Norway	Norbert Ozimek; Poland	György Horváth; Hungary
90 kg	Andon Nikolov; Bulgaria	Atanas Shopov; Bulgaria	Hans Bettembourg; Sweden
110 kg	Jaan Talts; Soviet Union	Aleksandr Kraichev; Bulgaria	Stefan Grützner; East Germany
+110 kg	Vasiliy Alekseyev; Soviet Union	Rudolf Mang; West Germany	Gerd Bonk; East Germany

== Medal table ==
Rank	Nation	Gold	Silver	Bronze	Total
1	Bulgaria	3	3	0	6
2	Soviet Union	3	1	1	5
3	Hungary	1	1	3	5
4	Poland	1	1	1	3
5	Norway	1	0	0	1
6	Iran	0	1	0	1
6	Lebanon	0	1	0	1
6	West Germany	0	1	0	1
9	East Germany	0	0	2	2
10	Italy	0	0	1	1
10	Sweden	0	0	1	1
Totals (11 entries)		9	9	9	27

== Sources ==
- "Olympic Medal Winners". International Olympic Committee.
