= 1972 European Weightlifting Championships =

International weightlifting competition

1972 European Championships

The 1972 European Weightlifting Championships were held in Constanţa, Romania from May 13 to May 21, 1972. This was the 51st edition of the event. There were 157 men in action from 27 nations.

== Medal summary ==
Event	Gold		Silver		Bronze	
52 kg
Press	Adam Gnatov; Soviet Union	120.0 kg	Zygmunt Smalcerz; Poland	112.5 kg	Lajos Szűcs; Hungary	107.5 kg
Snatch	Zygmunt Smalcerz; Poland	102.5 kg	Ion Hortopan; Romania	95.0 kg	Boleslav Pachol; Czechoslovakia	95.0 kg
Clean & Jerk	Lajos Szűcs; Hungary	127.5 kg	Adam Gnatov; Soviet Union	127.5 kg	Zygmunt Smalcerz; Poland	125.0 kg
Total	Zygmunt Smalcerz; Poland	340.0 kg	Adam Gnatov; Soviet Union	332.5 kg	Lajos Szűcs; Hungary	327.5 kg
56 kg
Press	Rafail Belenkov; Soviet Union	120.0 kg	Waldemar Korcz; Poland	115.0 kg	Georgi Todorov; Bulgaria	115.0 kg
Snatch	Rafail Belenkov; Soviet Union	105.0 kg	Szymon Czyz; Poland	105.0 kg	Georgi Todorov; Bulgaria	102.5 kg
Clean & Jerk	Georgi Todorov; Bulgaria	137.5 kg	Rafail Belenkov; Soviet Union	135.0 kg	Victor Rusu; Romania	135.0 kg
Total	Rafail Belenkov; Soviet Union	360.0 kg	Georgi Todorov; Bulgaria	355.0 kg	Waldemar Korcz; Poland	352.5 kg
60 kg
Press	Henryk Trębicki; Poland	125.0 kg	Ymer Pampuri; Albania	125.0 kg	Dito Shanidze; Soviet Union	122.5 kg
Snatch	Dito Shanidze; Soviet Union	120.0 kg	Norair Nurikyan; Bulgaria	117.5 kg	Wolfgang Zander; East Germany	112.5 kg
Clean & Jerk	Dito Shanidze; Soviet Union	152.5 kg	Norair Nurikyan; Bulgaria	150.0 kg	Mieczysław Nowak; Poland	150.0 kg
Total	Dito Shanidze; Soviet Union	395.0 kg	Norair Nurikyan; Bulgaria	387.5 kg	Mieczysław Nowak; Poland	375.0 kg
67.5 kg
Press	Mladen Kuchev; Bulgaria	155.0 kg	Zbigniew Kaczmarek; Poland	150.0 kg	Pietro Masala; West Germany	142.5 kg
Snatch	Mukharby Kirzhinov; Soviet Union	130.0 kg	Mladen Kuchev; Bulgaria	125.0 kg	Zbigniew Kaczmarek; Poland	125.0 kg
Clean & Jerk	Mladen Kuchev; Bulgaria	167.5 kg	Mukharby Kirzhinov; Soviet Union	167.5 kg	Zbigniew Kaczmarek; Poland	167.5 kg
Total	Mladen Kuchev; Bulgaria	447.5 kg	Zbigniew Kaczmarek; Poland	442.5 kg	Mukharby Kirzhinov; Soviet Union	435.0 kg
75 kg
Press	Viktor Kurentsov; Soviet Union	160.0 kg	Yordan Bikov; Bulgaria	155.0 kg	Anselmo Silvino; Italy	150.0 kg
Snatch	Aimé Terme; France	140.0 kg	Yordan Bikov; Bulgaria	137.5 kg	Frank Zielecke; East Germany	137.5 kg
Clean & Jerk	Yordan Bikov; Bulgaria	185.0 kg	Viktor Kurentsov; Soviet Union	177.5 kg	Anselmo Silvino; Italy	175.0 kg
Total	Yordan Bikov; Bulgaria	477.5 kg	Viktor Kurentsov; Soviet Union	472.5 kg	Anselmo Silvino; Italy	460.0 kg
82.5 kg
Press	Boris Pavlov; Soviet Union	175.0 kg	Leif Jenssen; Norway	170.0 kg	Dino Turcato; Italy	165.0 kg
Snatch	Kaarlo Kangasniemi; Finland	155.0 kg	Leif Jenssen; Norway	150.0 kg	Boris Pavlov; Soviet Union	147.5 kg
Clean & Jerk	Boris Pavlov; Soviet Union	190.0 kg	Juhani Avellan; Finland	187.5 kg	Norbert Ozimek; Poland	185.0 kg
Total	Boris Pavlov; Soviet Union	512.5 kg	Leif Jenssen; Norway	505.0 kg	Kaarlo Kangasniemi; Finland	495.0 kg
90 kg
Press	David Rigert; Soviet Union	185.0 kg	Karl Arnold; East Germany	185.0 kg	Andon Nikolov; Bulgaria	182.5 kg
Snatch	David Rigert; Soviet Union	165.0 kg	Jaakko Kailajärvi; Finland	155.0 kg	Andon Nikolov; Bulgaria	152.5 kg
Clean & Jerk	David Rigert; Soviet Union	207.5 kg	Atanas Shopov; Bulgaria	202.5 kg	Jaakko Kailajärvi; Finland	190.0 kg
Total	David Rigert; Soviet Union	557.5 kg	Atanas Shopov; Bulgaria	527.5 kg	Andon Nikolov; Bulgaria	525.0 kg
110 kg
Press	Jaan Talts; Soviet Union	200.0 kg	Helmut Losch; East Germany	192.5 kg	Stefan Grützner; East Germany	187.5 kg
Snatch	Jaan Talts; Soviet Union	165.0 kg	Kauko Kangasniemi; Finland	160.0 kg	Stefan Grützner; East Germany	157.5 kg
Clean & Jerk	Jaan Talts; Soviet Union	222.5 kg	Stefan Grützner; East Germany	205.0 kg	Kauko Kangasniemi; Finland	200.0 kg
Total	Jaan Talts; Soviet Union	587.5 kg	Stefan Grützner; East Germany	550.0 kg	Kauko Kangasniemi; Finland	540.0 kg
+110 kg
Press	Rudolf Mang; West Germany	230.0 kg	Vasily Alekseyev; Soviet Union	225.0 kg	Serge Reding; Belgium	210.0 kg
Snatch	Rudolf Mang; West Germany	177.5 kg	Vasily Alekseyev; Soviet Union	175.0 kg	Kalevi Lahdenranta; Finland	170.0 kg
Clean & Jerk	Vasily Alekseyev; Soviet Union	232.5 kg	Rudolf Mang; West Germany	222.5 kg	Gerd Bonk; East Germany	215.0 kg
Total	Vasily Alekseyev; Soviet Union	632.5 kg	Rudolf Mang; West Germany	630.0 kg	Gerd Bonk; East Germany	565.0 kg

== Medal table ==
Ranking by Big (Total result) medals

Rank	Nation	Gold	Silver	Bronze	Total
1	Soviet Union	6	2	1	9
2	Bulgaria	2	3	1	6
3	Poland	1	1	2	4
4	East Germany	0	1	1	2
5	Norway	0	1	0	1
5	West Germany	0	1	0	1
7	Finland	0	0	2	2
8	Hungary	0	0	1	1
8	Italy	0	0	1	1
Totals (9 entries)		9	9	9	27
