= 1971 European Weightlifting Championships =

International weightlifting competition

1971 European Championships

The 1971 European Weightlifting Championships were held at the Universiada Hall in Sofia, Bulgaria from June 19 to June 27, 1971. This was the 50th edition of the event. There were 123 men in action from 23 nations.

== Medal summary ==
Event	Gold		Silver		Bronze	
52 kg
Press	Sándor Holczreiter; Hungary	112.5 kg	Zygmunt Smalcerz; Poland	110.0 kg	Zoltan Fiat; Romania	97.5 kg
Snatch	Zygmunt Smalcerz; Poland	97.5 kg	Sándor Holczreiter; Hungary	95.0 kg	Mustafa Mustafov; Bulgaria	92.5 kg
Clean & Jerk	Zygmunt Smalcerz; Poland	125.0 kg	Mustafa Mustafov; Bulgaria	120.0 kg	Sándor Holczreiter; Hungary	120.0 kg
Total	Zygmunt Smalcerz; Poland	332.5 kg	Sándor Holczreiter; Hungary	327.5 kg	Mustafa Mustafov; Bulgaria	305.0 kg
56 kg
Press	Imre Földi; Hungary	125.0 kg	Gennady Chetin; Soviet Union	117.5 kg	Atanas Kirov; Bulgaria	112.5 kg
Snatch	Gennady Chetin; Soviet Union	105.0 kg	Imre Földi; Hungary	105.0 kg	Walter Szołtysek; Poland	105.0 kg
Clean & Jerk	Imre Földi; Hungary	137.5 kg	Walter Szołtysek; Poland	135.0 kg	Gennady Chetin; Soviet Union	132.5 kg
Total	Imre Földi; Hungary	367.5 kg	Gennady Chetin; Soviet Union	355.0 kg	Walter Szołtysek; Poland	350.0 kg
60 kg
Press	Mladen Kuchev; Bulgaria	130.0 kg	Kazimierz Czarnecki; Poland	125.0 kg	Dito Shanidze; Soviet Union	122.5 kg
Snatch	Jan Wojnowski; Poland	122.5 kg	Dito Shanidze; Soviet Union	120.0 kg	János Benedek; Hungary	120.0 kg
Clean & Jerk	Jan Wojnowski; Poland	155.0 kg	Dito Shanidze; Soviet Union	152.5 kg	Mladen Kuchev; Bulgaria	147.5 kg
Total	Jan Wojnowski; Poland	397.5 kg	Dito Shanidze; Soviet Union	395.0 kg	János Benedek; Hungary	390.0 kg
67.5 kg
Press	Waldemar Baszanowski; Poland	145.0 kg	József Máthé; Hungary	145.0 kg	Zbigniew Kaczmarek; Poland	140.0 kg
Snatch	Waldemar Baszanowski; Poland	137.5 kg	Zbigniew Kaczmarek; Poland	125.0 kg	Stefan Tsonchev; Bulgaria	120.0 kg
Clean & Jerk	Zbigniew Kaczmarek; Poland	170 kg	Waldemar Baszanowski; Poland	167.5 kg	József Máthé; Hungary	157.5 kg
Total	Waldemar Baszanowski; Poland	450.0 kg	Zbigniew Kaczmarek; Poland	435.0 kg	József Máthé; Hungary	412.5 kg
75 kg
Press	János Bagócs; Hungary	147.5 kg	Viktor Kurentsov; Soviet Union	147.5 kg	Ondrej Hekel; Czechoslovakia	145.0 kg
Snatch	Ondrej Hekel; Czechoslovakia	140.0 kg	Gábor Szarvas; Hungary	140.0 kg	Aimé Terme; France	137.5 kg
Clean & Jerk	Viktor Kurentsov; Soviet Union	180.0 kg	Gábor Szarvas; Hungary	177.5 kg	János Bagócs; Hungary	167.5 kg
Total	Viktor Kurentsov; Soviet Union	462.5 kg	Gábor Szarvas; Hungary	460.0 kg	Ondrej Hekel; Czechoslovakia	452.5 kg
82.5 kg
Press	Gennady Ivanchenko; Soviet Union	165.0 kg	György Horváth; Hungary	162.5 kg	Dino Turcato; Italy	160.0 kg
Snatch	Gennady Ivanchenko; Soviet Union	147.5 kg	Dimitar Slavov; Bulgaria	142.5 kg	György Horváth; Hungary	140.0 kg
Clean & Jerk	Gennady Ivanchenko; Soviet Union	187.5 kg	György Horváth; Hungary	187.5 kg	Juhani Avellan; Finland	180.0 kg
Total	Gennady Ivanchenko; Soviet Union	500.0 kg	György Horváth; Hungary	490.0 kg	Dino Turcato; Italy	465.0 kg
90 kg
Press	Hans Bettembourg; Sweden	190.0 kg	Bo Johansson; Sweden	182.5 kg	David Rigert; Soviet Union	172.5 kg
Snatch	David Rigert; Soviet Union	160.0 kg	Bo Johansson; Sweden	155.0 kg	Stanisław Kordyka; Poland	145.0 kg
Clean & Jerk	David Rigert; Soviet Union	205.0 kg WR	Bo Johansson; Sweden	200.0 kg	Atanas Shopov; Bulgaria	195.0 kg
Total	David Rigert; Soviet Union	537.5 kg	Bo Johansson; Sweden	537.5 kg	Atanas Shopov; Bulgaria	512.5 kg
110 kg
Press	Aleksandar Kraychev; Bulgaria	192.5 kg	Valery Yakubovski; Soviet Union	190.0 kg	Karl Utsar; Soviet Union	187.5 kg
Snatch	Karl Utsar; Soviet Union	162.5 kg	Kauko Kangasniemi; Finland	160.0 kg	Aleksandar Kraychev; Bulgaria	160.0 kg
Clean & Jerk	Valery Yakubovski; Soviet Union	210.0 kg	Aleksandar Kraychev; Bulgaria	205.0 kg	Helmut Losch; East Germany	200.0 kg
Total	Valery Yakubovski; Soviet Union	560.0 kg	Aleksandar Kraychev; Bulgaria	557.5 kg	Karl Utsar; Soviet Union	545.0 kg
+110 kg
Press	Vasily Alekseyev; Soviet Union	225.0 kg WR	Stanislav Batishchev; Soviet Union	217.5 kg	Rudolf Mang; West Germany	212.5 kg
Snatch	Rudolf Mang; West Germany	175.0 kg	Vasily Alekseyev; Soviet Union	172.5 kg	Stanislav Batishchev; Soviet Union	170.0 kg
Clean & Jerk	Vasily Alekseyev; Soviet Union	232.5 kg WR	Stanislav Batishchev; Soviet Union	220.0 kg	Rudolf Mang; West Germany	215.0 kg
Total	Vasily Alekseyev; Soviet Union	630.0 kg WR	Stanislav Batishchev; Soviet Union	607.5 kg	Rudolf Mang; West Germany	602.5 kg

== Medal table ==
Ranking by Big (Total result) medals

Rank	Nation	Gold	Silver	Bronze	Total
1	Soviet Union	5	3	1	9
2	Poland	3	1	1	5
3	Hungary	1	3	2	6
4	Bulgaria	0	1	2	3
5	Sweden	0	1	0	1
6	Czechoslovakia	0	0	1	1
6	Italy	0	0	1	1
6	West Germany	0	0	1	1
Totals (8 entries)		9	9	9	27
