= 1971 World Weightlifting Championships =

International weightlifting competition

1971 Men's World Championships

The 1971 Men's World Weightlifting Championships were held in Lima, Peru from September 18 to September 26, 1971. There were 144 men from 30 nations in the competition.

== Medal summary ==
Event	Gold		Silver		Bronze	
52 kg
Press	Sándor Holczreiter; Hungary	120.0 kg	Zygmunt Smalcerz; Poland	115.0 kg	Masahiro Ueki; Japan	97.5 kg
Snatch	Zygmunt Smalcerz; Poland	95.0 kg	Sándor Holczreiter; Hungary	95.0 kg	Juan Romero; Colombia	92.5 kg
Clean & Jerk	Zygmunt Smalcerz; Poland	130.0 kg	Mustafa Mustafov; Bulgaria	122.5 kg	Masahiro Ueki; Japan	122.5 kg
Total	Zygmunt Smalcerz; Poland	340.0 kg	Sándor Holczreiter; Hungary	335.0 kg	Masahiro Ueki; Japan	307.5 kg
56 kg
Press	Mohammad Nassiri; Iran	120.0 kg	Imre Földi; Hungary	120.0 kg	Henryk Trębicki; Poland	120.0 kg
Snatch	Henryk Trębicki; Poland	107.5 kg	Gennady Chetin; Soviet Union	107.5 kg	Jiro Hosotani; Japan	102.5 kg
Clean & Jerk	Gennady Chetin; Soviet Union	145.0 kg	Mohammad Nassiri; Iran	142.5 kg	Atanas Kirov; Bulgaria	140.0 kg
Total	Gennady Chetin; Soviet Union	370.0 kg	Henryk Trębicki; Poland	367.5 kg	Mohammad Nassiri; Iran	360.0 kg
60 kg
Press	Yoshiyuki Miyake; Japan	122.5 kg	Kenkichi Ando; Japan	122.5 kg	Kurt Pittner; Austria	120.0 kg
Snatch	Yoshiyuki Miyake; Japan	115.0 kg	Kenkichi Ando; Japan	112.5 kg	Kurt Pittner; Austria	112.5 kg
Clean & Jerk	Yoshiyuki Miyake; Japan	150.0 kg	Kenkichi Ando; Japan	147.5 kg	Norair Nurikyan; Bulgaria	147.5 kg
Total	Yoshiyuki Miyake; Japan	387.5 kg	Kenkichi Ando; Japan	382.5 kg	Norair Nurikyan; Bulgaria	377.5 kg
67.5 kg
Press	Zbigniew Kaczmarek; Poland	147.5 kg	Nasrollah Dehnavi; Iran	140.0 kg	Waldemar Baszanowski; Poland	140.0 kg
Snatch	Waldemar Baszanowski; Poland	130.0 kg	Masayuki Yano; Japan	127.5 kg	Mukharby Kirzhinov; Soviet Union	127.5 kg
Clean & Jerk	Mukharby Kirzhinov; Soviet Union	167.5 kg	Nasrollah Dehnavi; Iran	165.0 kg	Waldemar Baszanowski; Poland	165.0 kg
Total	Zbigniew Kaczmarek; Poland	440.0 kg	Waldemar Baszanowski; Poland	435.0 kg	Mukharby Kirzhinov; Soviet Union	430.0 kg
75 kg
Press	Russell Knipp; United States	162.5 kg	Vladimir Kanygin; Soviet Union	160.0 kg	Anselmo Silvino; Italy	155.0 kg
Snatch	Leif Jenssen; Norway	142.5 kg	Vladimir Kanygin; Soviet Union	142.5 kg	Ondrej Hekel; Czechoslovakia	140.0 kg
Clean & Jerk	Yordan Bikov; Bulgaria	180.0 kg	Anselmo Silvino; Italy	175.0 kg	Ondrej Hekel; Czechoslovakia	175.0 kg
Total	Vladimir Kanygin; Soviet Union	477.5 kg	Leif Jenssen; Norway	467.5 kg	Anselmo Silvino; Italy	465.0 kg
82.5 kg
Press	Christos Iakovou; Greece	162.5 kg	Boris Pavlov; Soviet Union	160.0 kg	Kaarlo Kangasniemi; Finland	160.0 kg
Snatch	Kaarlo Kangasniemi; Finland	150.0 kg	Boris Pavlov; Soviet Union	145.0 kg	Mike Karchut; United States	145.0 kg
Clean & Jerk	Boris Pavlov; Soviet Union	190.0 kg	György Horváth; Hungary	190.0 kg	Mike Karchut; United States	182.5 kg
Total	Boris Pavlov; Soviet Union	495.0 kg	Kaarlo Kangasniemi; Finland	490.0 kg	György Horváth; Hungary	480.0 kg
90 kg
Press	Vasily Kolotov; Soviet Union	185.0 kg	Hans Bettembourg; Sweden	180.0 kg	David Rigert; Soviet Union	177.5 kg
Snatch	David Rigert; Soviet Union	162.5 kg	Vasily Kolotov; Soviet Union	155.0 kg	Bo Johansson; Sweden	155.0 kg
Clean & Jerk	David Rigert; Soviet Union	202.5 kg	Vasily Kolotov; Soviet Union	197.5 kg	Rick Holbrook; United States	197.5 kg
Total	David Rigert; Soviet Union	542.5 kg	Vasily Kolotov; Soviet Union	537.5 kg	Bo Johansson; Sweden	522.5 kg
110 kg
Press	Yury Kozin; Soviet Union	200.0 kg	Aleksandar Kraychev; Bulgaria	187.5 kg	Roberto Vezzani; Italy	185.0 kg
Snatch	Stefan Grützner; East Germany	165.0 kg	Kauko Kangasniemi; Finland	162.5 kg	Aleksandar Kraychev; Bulgaria	155.0 kg
Clean & Jerk	Helmut Losch; East Germany	205.0 kg	Stefan Grützner; East Germany	205.0 kg	Yury Kozin; Soviet Union	202.5 kg
Total	Yury Kozin; Soviet Union	552.5 kg	Stefan Grützner; East Germany	547.5 kg	Aleksandar Kraychev; Bulgaria	545.0 kg
+110 kg
Press	Vasily Alekseyev; Soviet Union	230.0 kg WR	Serge Reding; Belgium	227.5 kg	Ken Patera; United States	212.5 kg
Snatch	Vasily Alekseyev; Soviet Union	170.0 kg	Ken Patera; United States	167.5 kg	Serge Reding; Belgium	160.0 kg
Clean & Jerk	Vasily Alekseyev; Soviet Union	235.0 kg	Ken Patera; United States	212.5 kg	Fernando Bernal; Cuba	197.5 kg
Total	Vasily Alekseyev; Soviet Union	635.0 kg	Ken Patera; United States	592.5 kg	Ivan Atanasov; Bulgaria	532.5 kg

== Medal table ==
Ranking by Big (Total result) medals

Rank	Nation	Gold	Silver	Bronze	Total
1	Soviet Union	6	1	1	8
2	Poland	2	2	0	4
3	Japan	1	1	1	3
4	Hungary	0	1	1	2
5	East Germany	0	1	0	1
5	Finland	0	1	0	1
5	Norway	0	1	0	1
5	United States	0	1	0	1
9	Bulgaria	0	0	3	3
10	Iran	0	0	1	1
10	Italy	0	0	1	1
10	Sweden	0	0	1	1
Totals (12 entries)		9	9	9	27

Ranking by all medals: Big (Total result) and Small (Press, Snatch and Clean & Jerk)

Rank	Nation	Gold	Silver	Bronze	Total
1	Soviet Union	16	8	4	28
2	Poland	7	3	3	13
3	Japan	4	5	4	13
4	East Germany	2	2	0	4
5	Hungary	1	4	1	6
6	United States	1	3	4	8
7	Iran	1	3	1	5
8	Bulgaria	1	2	6	9
9	Finland	1	2	1	4
10	Norway	1	1	0	2
11	Greece	1	0	0	1
12	Italy	0	1	3	4
13	Sweden	0	1	2	3
14	Belgium	0	1	1	2
15	Austria	0	0	2	2
15	Czechoslovakia	0	0	2	2
17	Colombia	0	0	1	1
17	Cuba	0	0	1	1
Totals (18 entries)		36	36	36	108
