= Weightlifting at the 1972 Summer Olympics – Men's 67.5 kg =

Weightlifting at the Olympics

67.5 kg at the Games of the XX Olympiad
- Venue: Weightlifting Hall 7, Gewichtheberhalle
- Dates: 30 August 1972
- Competitors: 22 from 18 nations

Medalists
1st place, gold medalist(s)		Mukharby Kirzhinov; Soviet Union
2nd place, silver medalist(s)		Mladen Kuchev; Bulgaria
3rd place, bronze medalist(s)		Zbigniew Kaczmarek; Poland

Total of best lifts in military press, snatch and jerk. Ties were broken by the lightest bodyweight.

== Final ==
Rank	Name	Nationality	Body weight	Military press (kg)				Snatch (kg)				Jerk (kg)				Total (kg)
Rank	Name	Nationality	Body weight	1	2	3	Result	1	2	3	Result	1	2	3	Result	Total (kg)
1st place, gold medalist(s)	Mukharby Kirzhinov	Soviet Union	66.80	142.5	~~147.5~~	147.5	147.5	130.0	~~135.0~~	135.0	135.0 =OR	167.5	172.5	177.5	177.5 WR	460.0 WR
2nd place, silver medalist(s)	Mladen Kuchev	Bulgaria	66.90	150.0	~~157.5~~	157.5	157.5 WR	~~125.0~~	125.0	~~130.0~~	125.0	162.5	167.5	~~175.0~~	167.5	450.0
3rd place, bronze medalist(s)	Zbigniew Kaczmarek	Poland	67.10	~~145.0~~	145.0	~~150.0~~	145.0	125.0	~~130.0~~	~~130.0~~	125.0	167.5	~~172.5~~	–	167.5	437.5
4	Waldemar Baszanowski	Poland	66.90	~~142.5~~	~~142.5~~	142.5	142.5	130.0	~~135.0~~	~~135.0~~	130.0	162.5	~~167.5~~	~~167.5~~	162.5	435.0
5	Nasrollah Dehnavi	Iran	67.30	142.5	147.5	150.0	150.0	~~125.0~~	125.0	~~130.0~~	125.0	160.0	~~165.0~~	~~165.0~~	160.0	435.0
6	Jenő Ambrózi	Hungary	66.90	137.5	142.5	~~147.5~~	142.5	120.0	~~125.0~~	~~125.0~~	120.0	165.0	~~170.0~~	~~172.5~~	165.0	427.5
7	Won Sin-Hui	South Korea	67.20	127.5	132.5	~~135.0~~	132.5	125.0	130.0	~~132.5~~	130.0	165.0	~~170.0~~	~~170.0~~	165.0	427.5
8	Masao Kato	Japan	66.40	132.5	137.5	140.0	140.0	~~120.0~~	120.0	~~125.0~~	120.0	160.0	165.0	~~170.0~~	160.0	425.0
9	Dan Cantore	United States	67.10	~~132.5~~	132.5	140.0	140.0	117.5	~~122.5~~	~~122.5~~	117.5	155.0	~~160.0~~	162.5	162.5	420.0
10	Yusaku Ono	Japan	66.60	130.0	135.0	~~140.0~~	135.0	120.0	125.0	~~127.5~~	125.0	~~157.5~~	157.5	~~167.5~~	157.5	417.5
11	Wolfgang Faber	East Germany	67.00	132.5	137.5	~~140.0~~	137.5	~~115.0~~	~~115.0~~	115.0	115.0	152.5	~~157.5~~	~~157.5~~	152.5	405.0
12	Werner Schraut	West Germany	67.10	~~127.5~~	127.5	~~132.5~~	127.5	120.0	~~125.0~~	125.0	125.0	150.0	~~155.0~~	~~155.0~~	150.0	402.5
13	Leopold Herenčić	Yugoslavia	67.20	~~137.5~~	137.5	142.5	142.5	115.0	~~120.0~~	~~120.0~~	115.0	142.5	~~147.5~~	~~147.5~~	142.5	400.0
14	Francisco Mateos	Spain	66.60	127.5	~~132.5~~	132.5	132.5	~~112.5~~	112.5	117.5	117.5	147.5	~~152.5~~	~~152.5~~	147.5	397.5
15	George Newton	Great Britain	67.50	~~127.5~~	127.5	132.5	132.5	117.5	~~122.5~~	~~122.5~~	117.5	135.0	~~145.0~~	145.0	145.0	395.0
16	José Martínez	Colombia	67.10	132.5	~~137.5~~	~~137.5~~	132.5	~~102.5~~	102.5	~~107.5~~	102.5	140.0	145.0	~~150.0~~	145.0	380.0
17	Eleftherios Stefanoudakis	Greece	67.20	110.0	117.5	~~122.5~~	117.5	115.0	120.0	~~122.5~~	120.0	142.5	~~147.5~~	~~147.5~~	142.5	380.0
18	Ieuan Owen	Great Britain	66.70	117.5	122.5	~~127.5~~	122.5	~~107.5~~	~~107.5~~	107.5	107.5	145.0	~~150.0~~	~~155.0~~	145.0	375.0
19	Ildefonso Lee	Panama	66.70	115.0	~~120.0~~	120.0	120.0	105.0	110.0	~~112.5~~	110.0	135.0	~~140.0~~	~~140.0~~	135.0	365.0
20	Walter Legel	Austria	67.40	~~127.5~~	127.5	~~132.5~~	127.5	110.0	115.0	117.5	117.5	145.0	150.0	~~155.0~~	150.0	DQ [395.0]
21	Radnaasediin Amgaased	Mongolia	67.30	~~125.0~~	125.0	~~130.0~~	125.0	105.0	~~110.0~~	~~110.0~~	105.0				NVL	DNF
22	Pietro Masala	West Germany	67.20	~~137.5~~	~~137.5~~	~~137.5~~	NVL									DNF

Key: WR = world record; OR = Olympic record; DNF = did not finish; NVL = no valid lift; DQ = disqualified
