= Gennady Chetin =

Soviet weightlifter (1943–2002)

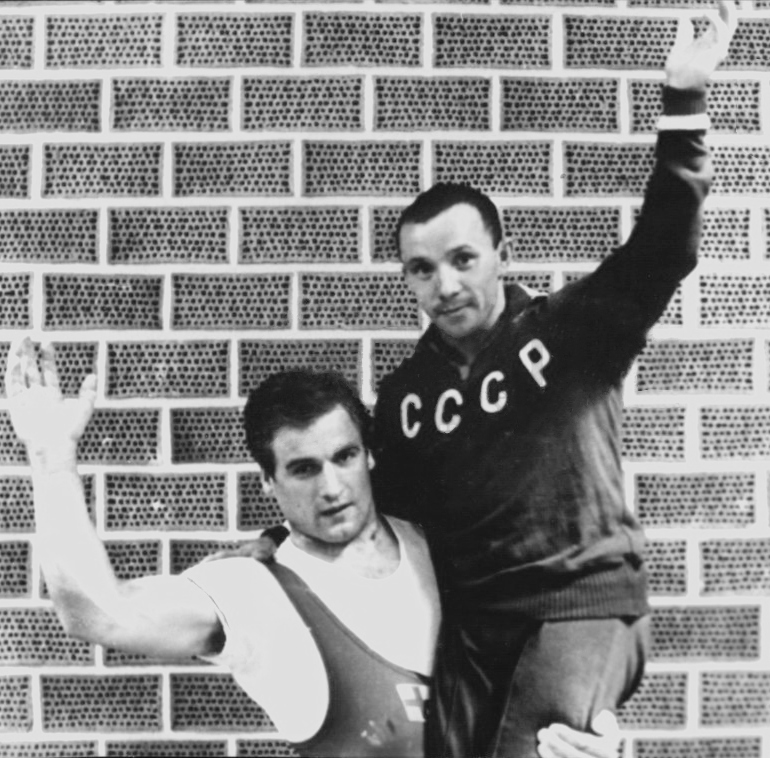
- Chetin (right) with Kaarlo Kangasniemi in 1968

Personal information
- Native name: Геннадий Тимофеевич Четин
- Born: 1 February 1943 Senino, Kudymkarsky District, Russian SFSR, Soviet Union
- Died: 2002 (aged 58–59) Uzbekistan
- Height: 1.51 m (4 ft 11 1/2 in)
- Weight: 56 kg (123 lb)

Sport
- Sport: Weightlifting
- Event: Bantamweight
- Club: Trud Perm
- Coached by: Rudolf Plyukfelder
- Retired: 1976 (weightlifting); 1992 (powerlifting)
Medal record
Representing the Soviet Union
Weightlifting
Olympic Games
Bronze medal – third place	1972 Munich	Bantamweight
World Weightlifting Championships
Gold medal – first place	1971 Lima	Bantamweight
Bronze medal – third place	1972 Munich	Bantamweight
European Weightlifting Championships
Silver medal – second place	1971 Sofia	Bantamweight

Gennady Timofeyevich Chetin (Russian: Геннадий Тимофеевич Четин; 1 February 1943 – 2002) was a Soviet bantamweight weightlifter. He competed at the 1968 and 1972 Summer Olympics, finishing fourth and third respectively. He became world champion in 1971 and set three ratified world records in the total. Chetin was a five-time Soviet national champion (1968, 1969, 1971, 1972, and 1976) and won the USSR Spartakiad in 1971.

== Early life ==
Chetin was born in Senino, a remote village in the Urals in the Kudymkarsky District of Perm Krai. He lost his mother at age 16 and was sent to a local orphanage. The director of the orphanage was a weightlifting enthusiast who noticed Chetin's exceptional strength relative to his small stature and gave him his first weightlifting lessons.

== Weightlifting career ==
Chetin first came to the attention of Soviet sports officials in 1963 when he finished fourth in the flyweight division at the Soviet championships. The following year, he won bronze in the flyweight class at the 1964 Soviet championships and subsequently moved up to the bantamweight division.

In 1964, Chetin relocated from Perm to Yalta and then to Shakhty to train under Rudolf Plyukfelder, the 1964 Olympic champion. Plyukfelder's weightlifting school in Shakhty produced numerous elite lifters including Alexey Vakhonin, David Rigert, Nikolay Kolesnikov, and Vasily Alekseyev. Chetin later returned to Perm, where he competed for the club Trud Perm.

=== National success ===
Chetin established himself as the top Soviet bantamweight of his era. He won the Soviet national championship five times: in 1968, 1969, 1971, 1972, and 1976. He also took silver medals at the Soviet championships in 1966 and 1967, and bronze in 1973. In 1971, he won the USSR Spartakiad, the major multi-sport event for Soviet athletes, with a total of 375 kg. He also won the Soviet Cup in both 1975 and 1976.

=== International career ===
At the 1968 Summer Olympics in Mexico City, Chetin finished fourth in the bantamweight class with a total of 352.5 kg (110 kg press, 102.5 kg snatch, 140 kg clean and jerk), narrowly missing a medal. He achieved his greatest success at the 1971 World Weightlifting Championships in Lima, Peru, where he won the gold medal with a total of 370 kg. Earlier that year, he won silver at the 1971 European Weightlifting Championships in Sofia.

At the 1972 Summer Olympics in Munich, Chetin won the bronze medal in the bantamweight class with a total of 367.5 kg (120 kg press, 107.5 kg snatch, 140 kg clean and jerk), behind gold medalist Imre Földi of Hungary and silver medalist Mohammad Nassiri of Iran.

=== World records ===
Chetin set three ratified world records in the total during his career: in August 1968 in Helsinki (367.5 kg), in July 1971 in Moscow (375 kg), and in 1973 (255 kg in the new two-lift format). According to Olympedia, he also set one world record in the clean and jerk.

== Later life ==
Chetin semi-retired from competition between 1973 and 1976 to recover from alcoholism. He returned to win his fifth Soviet championship in 1976. In the late 1970s, after ending his weightlifting career, he moved from Perm to Uzbekistan at the invitation of a friend.

In Uzbekistan, Chetin initially worked as a farmer and ferryman. After Uzbekistan gained independence from the Soviet Union in 1991, he returned to strength sports, taking up powerlifting. In 1992, at age 49, he won gold at the European Powerlifting Championships in Horsens, Denmark, in the 60 kg class with a total of 612.5 kg (210 kg squat, 135 kg bench press, 267.5 kg deadlift). He also won a bronze medal at the World Powerlifting Championships the same year.

Chetin worked with the Uzbekistan national weightlifting team, first as head coach and later as a consultant. He died in 2002 in Uzbekistan.

== Major results ==
=== Olympics ===
Year	Competition	Location	Weight class	Rank	Total
1968	Summer Olympics	Mexico City	Bantamweight	4th	352.5 kg
1972	Summer Olympics	Munich	Bantamweight	Bronze	367.5 kg

=== World Championships ===
Year	Competition	Location	Weight class	Rank	Total
1971	World Championships	Lima	Bantamweight	Gold	370 kg
1972	World Championships	Munich	Bantamweight	Bronze	367.5 kg

=== European Championships ===
Year	Competition	Location	Weight class	Rank	Total
1971	European Championships	Sofia	Bantamweight	Silver	355 kg
