= Vezzani (disambiguation) =

Vezzani is a commune on the island of Corsica and an Italian surname. Notable people with the surname include:

- César Vezzani (1888–1951), French/Corsican tenor
- Roberto Vezzani (born 1942), Italian weightlifter
