= Weightlifting at the 1972 Summer Olympics – Men's 75 kg =

Weightlifting at the Olympics

75 kg at the Games of the XX Olympiad
- Venue: Weightlifting Hall 7, Gewichtheberhalle
- Dates: 31 August
- Competitors: 26 from 22 nations

Medalists
1st place, gold medalist(s)		Yordan Bikov; Bulgaria
2nd place, silver medalist(s)		Mohamed Tarabulsi; Lebanon
3rd place, bronze medalist(s)		Anselmo Silvino; Italy

In an out-of-competition attempt to break the world record in the snatch, both Aimé Terme of France and Mohamed Tarabulsi of Lebanon attempted to lift 146.5 kg to break the world record, both competitors failed the lift. Yossef Romano of Israel was one of the victims of the 5 September 1972, Munich Massacre.

== Results ==
Total of best lifts in military press, snatch and jerk. Ties are broken by the lightest bodyweight.

=== Final ===
Rank	Name	Nationality	Body weight	Military press (kg)				Snatch (kg)				Jerk (kg)				Total (kg)
Rank	Name	Nationality	Body weight	1	2	3	Result	1	2	3	Result	1	2	3	Result	Total (kg)
1st place, gold medalist(s)	Yordan Bikov	Bulgaria	74.50	150.0	155.0	160.0	160.0	135.0	140.0	~~142.5~~	140.0	177.5	185.0	–	185.0	485.0 WR
2nd place, silver medalist(s)	Mohamed Tarabulsi	Lebanon	74.05	150.0	155.0	160.0	160.0	140.0	~~145.0~~	~~145.0~~	140.0	~~167.5~~	167.5	172.5	172.5	472.5
3rd place, bronze medalist(s)	Anselmo Silvino	Italy	74.85	150.0	155.0	~~160.0~~	155.0	~~135.0~~	~~135.0~~	140.0	140.0	175.0	~~180.0~~	~~180.0~~	175.0	470.0
4	Ondrej Hekel	Czechoslovakia	73.90	140.0	~~150.0~~	150.0	150.0	137.5	142.5	~~145.0~~	142.5	170.0	~~175.0~~	~~175.0~~	170.0	462.5
5	Franklin Zielecke	East Germany	74.50	145.0	150.0	~~152.5~~	150.0	~~135.0~~	135.0	140.0	140.0	~~170.0~~	170.0	~~175.0~~	170.0	460.0
6	Gábor Szarvas	Hungary	74.80	145.0	~~150.0~~	150.0	150.0	135.0	~~140.0~~	~~140.0~~	135.0	175.0	~~180.0~~	~~180.0~~	175.0	460.0
7	András Stark	Hungary	74.85	147.5	152.5	~~155.0~~	152.5	132.5	137.5	~~140.0~~	137.5	170.0	~~175.0~~	~~175.0~~	170.0	460.0
8	Russ Knipp	United States	74.50	160.0	~~167.5~~	~~167.5~~	160.0	127.5	~~132.5~~	~~132.5~~	127.5	~~170.0~~	170.0	~~175.0~~	170.0	457.5
9	Frederick Lowe	United States	74.85	135.0	142.5	147.5	147.5	130.0	135.0	~~137.5~~	135.0	~~170.0~~	~~175.0~~	175.0	175.0	457.5
10T	Salvatore Laudani	Italy	74.90	147.5	152.5	155.0	155.0	115.0	~~120.0~~	120.0	120.0	160.0	~~165.0~~	165.0	165.0	440.0
10T	Tore Bjørnsen	Norway	74.90	~~145.0~~	145.0	~~150.0~~	145.0	130.0	~~135.0~~	~~135.0~~	130.0	165.0	~~170.0~~	~~170.0~~	165.0	440.0
12	Panagiotis Spyrou	Greece	74.50	140.0	~~145.0~~	145.0	145.0	~~112.5~~	112.5	117.5	117.5	~~162.5~~	162.5	167.5	167.5	430.0
13	Arvo Ala-Pöntiö	Finland	74.70	135.0	140.0	145.0	145.0	122.5	~~127.5~~	~~127.5~~	122.5	160.0	~~167.5~~	~~167.5~~	160.0	427.5
14	Erling Johansen	Denmark	74.50	132.5	137.5	~~142.5~~	137.5	122.5	127.5	~~132.5~~	127.5	152.5	~~160.0~~	160.0	160.0	425.0
15	Aimé Terme	France	74.70	117.5	122.5	127.5	127.5	137.5	~~142.5~~	142.5	142.5 OR	150.0	~~155.0~~	155.0	155.0	425.0
16	İsmail Bayram	Turkey	74.90	130.0	135.0	137.5	137.5	117.5	122.5	~~125.0~~	122.5	147.5	152.5	~~155.0~~	152.5	412.5
17	Tony Ebert	New Zealand	74.90	~~137.5~~	137.5	~~142.5~~	137.5	117.5	~~125.0~~	~~125.0~~	117.5	155.0	~~160.0~~	~~160.0~~	155.0	410.0
18	Natsagiin Ser-Od	Mongolia	74.55	~~130.0~~	130.0	~~135.0~~	130.0	~~115.0~~	115.0	122.5	122.5	142.5	147.5	–	147.5	400.0
19	Muhammad Arshad Malik	Pakistan	74.40	~~117.5~~	~~117.5~~	117.5	117.5	107.5	~~112.5~~	~~115.0~~	107.5	147.5	~~155.0~~	~~155.0~~	147.5	372.5
–	Keith Adams	Canada	74.55	137.5	~~145.0~~	~~145.0~~	137.5	~~115.0~~	~~115.0~~	~~115.0~~	NVL					DNF
–	Leopold Pichler	Austria	74.65	145.0	~~150.0~~	~~150.0~~	145.0	–	–	–	NVL					DNF
–	Vladimir Kanygin	Soviet Union	74.80	160.0	165.0	~~167.5~~	165.0 OR	~~137.5~~	~~137.5~~	~~137.5~~	NVL					DNF
–	Uwe Kliche	West Germany	74.60	145.0	~~150.0~~	~~150.0~~	145.0	122.5	~~127.5~~	~~127.5~~	122.5	–	–	–	NVL	DNF
–	Alfonso Rodríguez	Puerto Rico	73.00	~~127.5~~	~~127.5~~	~~127.5~~	NVL									DNF
–	Yossef Romano	Israel	73.80	~~137.5~~	~~137.5~~	~~137.5~~	NVL									DNF
–	Werner Dittrich	East Germany	74.40	~~150.0~~	~~150.0~~	~~150.0~~	NVL									DNF

Key: WR = world record; OR = Olympic record; DNF = did not finish; NVL = no valid lift
