= Weightlifting at the 1972 Summer Olympics – Men's 90 kg =

Weightlifting at the Olympics

90 kg at the Games of the XX Olympiad
- Venue: Weightlifting Hall 7, Gewichtheberhalle
- Dates: 3 September 1972
- Competitors: 23 from 19 nations

Medalists
1st place, gold medalist(s)		Andon Nikolov; Bulgaria
2nd place, silver medalist(s)		Atanas Shopov; Bulgaria
3rd place, bronze medalist(s)		Hans Bettembourg; Sweden

Total of best lifts in military press, snatch, and jerk. Ties are broken by the lightest body weight.

== Final ==
Rank	Name	Nationality	Body weight	Military press (kg)				Snatch (kg)				Jerk (kg)				Total (kg)
Rank	Name	Nationality	Body weight	1	2	3	Result	1	2	3	Result	1	2	3	Result	Total (kg)
1st place, gold medalist(s)	Andon Nikolov	Bulgaria	89.00	172.5	177.5	180.0	180.0	147.5	152.5	155.0	155.0	185.0	~~190.0~~	190.0	190.0	525.0 OR
2nd place, silver medalist(s)	Atanas Shopov	Bulgaria	89.80	172.5	177.5	180.0	180.0	140.0	~~145.0~~	145.0	145.0	~~192.5~~	192.5	~~202.5~~	192.5	517.5
3rd place, bronze medalist(s)	Hans Bettembourg	Sweden	88.95	175.0	~~182.5~~	182.5	182.5	~~145.0~~	~~145.0~~	145.0	145.0	185.0	~~192.5~~	~~192.5~~	185.0	512.5
4	Phil Grippaldi	United States	87.90	~~170.0~~	170.0	~~177.5~~	170.0	~~140.0~~	140.0	~~145.0~~	140.0	187.5	195.0	~~202.5~~	195.0	505.0
5	Rick Holbrook	United States	88.50	157.5	~~162.5~~	162.5	162.5	~~145.0~~	~~145.0~~	145.0	145.0	190.0	197.5	-	197.5 OR	505.0
6	Nick Ciancio	Australia	88.85	170.0	~~175.0~~	~~175.0~~	170.0	145.0	~~150.0~~	~~150.0~~	145.0	185.0	~~190.0~~	190.0	190.0	505.0
7	Juan Curbelo	Cuba	89.20	165.0	~~172.5~~	172.5	172.5	135.0	~~140.0~~	140.0	140.0	175.0	182.5	~~187.5~~	182.5	495.0
8	Jaakko Kailajärvi	Finland	88.85	~~150.0~~	~~150.0~~	150.0	150.0	150.0	~~155.0~~	~~155.0~~	150.0	187.5	~~195.0~~	~~195.0~~	187.5	487.5
9	Dietrich Leh	West Germany	89.85	165.0	~~170.0~~	170.0	170.0	140.0	~~145.0~~	~~145.0~~	140.0	~~177.5~~	177.5	-	177.5	487.5
10	Pierre Gourrier	France	89.60	145.0	~~152.5~~	~~152.5~~	145.0	142.5	147.5	~~152.5~~	147.5	180.0	~~190.0~~	~~190.0~~	180.0	472.5
11	Nikos Iliadis	Greece	87.60	155.0	~~162.5~~	~~162.5~~	155.0	122.5	130.0	135.0	135.0	~~175.0~~	175.0	180.0	180.0	470.0
12	Aimo Nieminen	Finland	89.65	150.0	~~155.0~~	~~155.0~~	150.0	~~140.0~~	140.0	~~145.0~~	140.0	~~170.0~~	~~170.0~~	170.0	170.0	460.0
13	Guðmundur Sigurðsson	Iceland	88.60	142.5	~~147.5~~	~~147.5~~	142.5	130.0	135.0	~~137.5~~	135.0	170.0	177.5	~~182.5~~	177.5	455.0
14	Rudolf Litsch	Austria	88.75	~~147.5~~	147.5	152.5	152.5	130.0	~~135.0~~	~~135.0~~	130.0	~~172.5~~	~~172.5~~	172.5	172.5	455.0
15T	Osman Mert	Turkey	89.85	~~152.5~~	152.5	160.0	160.0	122.5	~~127.5~~	127.5	127.5	155.0	162.5	167.5	167.5	455.0
15T	Peter Arthur	Great Britain	89.85	150.0	~~155.0~~	~~155.0~~	150.0	130.0	~~135.0~~	~~135.0~~	130.0	170.0	175.0	~~177.5~~	175.0	455.0
17	Wayne Wilson	Canada	89.70	~~137.5~~	~~137.5~~	137.5	137.5	120.0	127.5	~~132.5~~	127.5	170.0	~~177.5~~	~~177.5~~	170.0	435.0
18	César Gaudin	Puerto Rico	89.95	137.5	~~145.0~~	~~145.0~~	137.5	115.0	120.0	122.5	122.5	~~165.0~~	~~165.0~~	165.0	165.0	425.0
-	David Rigert	Soviet Union	88.60	~~180.0~~	180.0	187.5	187.5 OR	~~160.0~~	~~160.0~~	~~160.0~~	NVL					DNF
-	Frank Rothwell	Ireland	87.60	~~132.5~~	~~132.5~~	~~132.5~~	NVL									DNF
-	Ryoichi Goto	Japan	89.60	~~162.5~~	~~162.5~~	~~162.5~~	NVL									DNF
-	Rudolf Hill	Austria	89.65	~~160.0~~	~~160.0~~	~~160.0~~	NVL									DNF
-	John Bolton	New Zealand	89.65	~~165.0~~	~~165.0~~	~~167.5~~	NVL									DNF

Key: OR = Olympic record; DNF = did not finish; NVL = no valid lift

After setting an Olympic record with 187.5 kg in the press, Rigert failed in all three attempts at 160 kg in the snatch, despite holding the world record at 167.5 kg. Rigert was so upset that he literally pulled his hair out and banged his head against a well. He was restrained by his colleagues, but the next day threw another fit and had to be sent home.
