= Utsar =

Utsar is a surname. Notable people with the surname include:

- Andrus Utsar (born 1976), Estonian weightlifter
- Karl Utsar (born 1945), Estonian weightlifter
