= Frank Rothwell =

Frank Rothwell is the name of:

- Frank Rothwell (businessman), English businessman and football chairman
- Frank Rothwell (weightlifter) (born 1936), Irish Olympian
