= Panagiotis Spyrou (disambiguation) =

Panagiotis Spyrou may refer to:

- Panagiotis Spyrou (1936-2012), renowned cardiac surgeon, founder of the thoracic surgery clinic at Papanicolaou Hospital in Thessaloniki in 1983, the first of its kind in Greece
- Panagiotis Spyrou, basketball player for Aris B.C.
- Panagiotis Spyrou, Greek weightlifter
