= Turcato =

Turcato is an Italian surname. Notable people with the surname include:

- Carlo Turcato (1921–2017), Italian fencer
- Dino Turcato (1946–2026), Italian weightlifter
- Giulio Turcato (1912–1995), Italian artist
