= Dehnavi =

Surname list

Dehnavi (Persian: دهنوی) is an Iranian surname. Notable people with the surname include:

- Ghasem Dehnavi (born 1981), Iranian football player
- Nasrollah Dehnavi (born 1950), Iranian weightlifter
- Sajad Dehnavi (born 1989), Iranian volleyball player
