= WinCapita =

Finnish Ponzi scheme led by Hannu Kailajärvi

WinCapita, previously WinClub and GiiClub, was a Finnish Internet-based Ponzi scheme that advertised itself as a private investment club engaged in currency trading. In reality, it was a bucket shop like many other foreign exchange fraud schemes. It operated mainly in Finland, with a smaller number of members also in Sweden. The operation collected about 100 million euros from more than 10,000 investors, probably the largest fraud in Finnish history.

In March 2008, the National Bureau of Investigation started investigations of the club. In December 2011, the District Court of Vantaa found the chief suspect Hannu Kailajärvi guilty of aggravated fraud, and sentenced him to four years in prison. In February 2013, the Court of Appeal of Helsinki found him guilty of aggravated fraud and a money collection offence, and increased his prison sentence to five years. The verdict was upheld by the Supreme Court.

== Scheme ==
The company presented itself as an invitation-only foreign exchange investment club that required an initial investment of several thousand euros while promising up to 4-fold returns. As a proof of concept for its members it offered an automatic "signal clock" software which was said to predict good times to buy or sell a currency.

Members for the new club were acquired at presentation meetings, to which current members were encouraged to bring friends, who could then in turn be persuaded into investing in the club. The importance of respect and loyalty to the club were underlined in its rules.

The "investors' club" was especially popular on several web forums. The few lucky ones on the top of the pyramid who got initially paid told success stories to others, spreading trust to the club. According to intermediary police report over 10,000 people invested a total of almost 100 million euros in the club. However, only a small fraction of those have filed a police report so far. (About 2,250 as of June, 2009, for a sum of 33 million euros)

=== History ===
The investment company had been in operation since 2005 under the name "WinClub". The company was registered in Panama. It changed its name to WinCapita when the MTV3 television channel reported in 2007 that the police were investigating a pyramid scheme. The ongoing investigation had little effect on the club's membership, which continued to rise quickly. The club published reports to its members, where it claimed the media had made a mistake and the claims were out of line. The operations continued as WinCapita until 7 March 2008. On this day, the web site of the company went offline and the chief suspect, Hannu Kailajärvi, consequently disappeared from the public.

Kailajärvi was arrested in early December 2008 in Nässjö, Sweden. He had been hiding in a small cottage that had been acquired for him by a Sweden-residing person with a Finnish name. Kailajärvi was believed to have lived at least half a year in the cottage, telling his neighbours that he was renovating the house for a famous Finnish opera singer. Swedish police found three mobile phones in the cottage, and an Internet connection had been installed.

=== Conspiracy theories ===
Even after Kailajärvi's disappearance, many club members still had faith in the club, forwarding reassuring emails to each other. In March 2009 the biggest Finnish newspaper Helsingin Sanomat published an article about the wild-running conspiracy theories surrounding WinCapita. Many former members still believed that the club had been legitimate and that the police and the Ministry of the Interior were concealing evidence. It was stressed in the report that the chief suspect Hannu Kailajärvi had reportedly already admitted in the questionings that the operation had been fraudulent.

== Criminal investigation ==
In November, 2009, the investigation was ongoing, and the main suspect was held for trial in Finland. Another suspect, who is thought to have had a more minor role in the scheme, was also being held after being arrested at the airport when returning from Thailand.

In late October, 2009 another suspect was arrested in the WinCapita case, this time by the Thai police. He is said to have had a central role in the scheme. A warrant for his arrest was declared in absentia, and an Interpol red notice was simultaneously issued.

=== Trial ===
The trial against the chief suspect Hannu Kailajärvi and his female associate began in February 2011 in the District Court of Vantaa. The accused were charged with aggravated fraud and a money collection offence. The prosecutor sought a minimum of five years in prison for Kailajärvi and forfeiting about six million euros to the state as criminal proceeds. Compensation to the victims will be tried in a separate case after the criminal trial has concluded, as will the criminal case against those up to 600 individuals that have been suspected of locally advancing the club.

A total of five people are suspected of involvement in the central organization of the scheme, but three of them remain at large, and could face court proceedings later. Kailajärvi and his female associate denied all charges, pleading that the proceeds were legally acquired as in any other business. The product that the company had been selling was a "signaling system", that the members could use in their own currency trading. According to the defence, the club did not ever involve itself in currency trading because the development of the automatic currency trading software had not finished.

Claims for damages in the court proceedings total to 37 million euros. In December 2011, the district court found Kailajärvi guilty of aggravated fraud and sentenced him to the maximum sentence of four years in prison. His female associate and former partner received a one year's suspended sentence. Kailajärvi appealed the decision. In February 2013, the Court of Appeal of Helsinki found Kailajärvi again guilty of aggravated fraud and also additionally of a money collection offence, and sentenced him to five years in prison, with his female associate receiving a 15-month suspended sentence for assisting.

Kailajärvi applied for a leave to appeal to the Supreme Court, but the Supreme Court upheld the verdict, 5 years imprisonment with no parole for aggravated fraud and illegal fundraising. Kailajärvi was released on parole in April 2014, and is writing a book about the case.

There was another unsettled issue whose judicial process continued: whether the profits of WinCapita, €20 million, could be considered proceeds of crime or not. The Court of Appeals of Eastern Finland decided (voting 2-1) that because part of the business conducted was legal, the profits cannot inherently be proceeds of crime. If they were, they would be confiscated by the government. In October 2014, the Supreme Court of Finland decided that the profits are proceeds of crime, and can be confiscated. The proceeds are used to compensate the victims.
