= Attila József Primary School of Szigetszentmiklós =

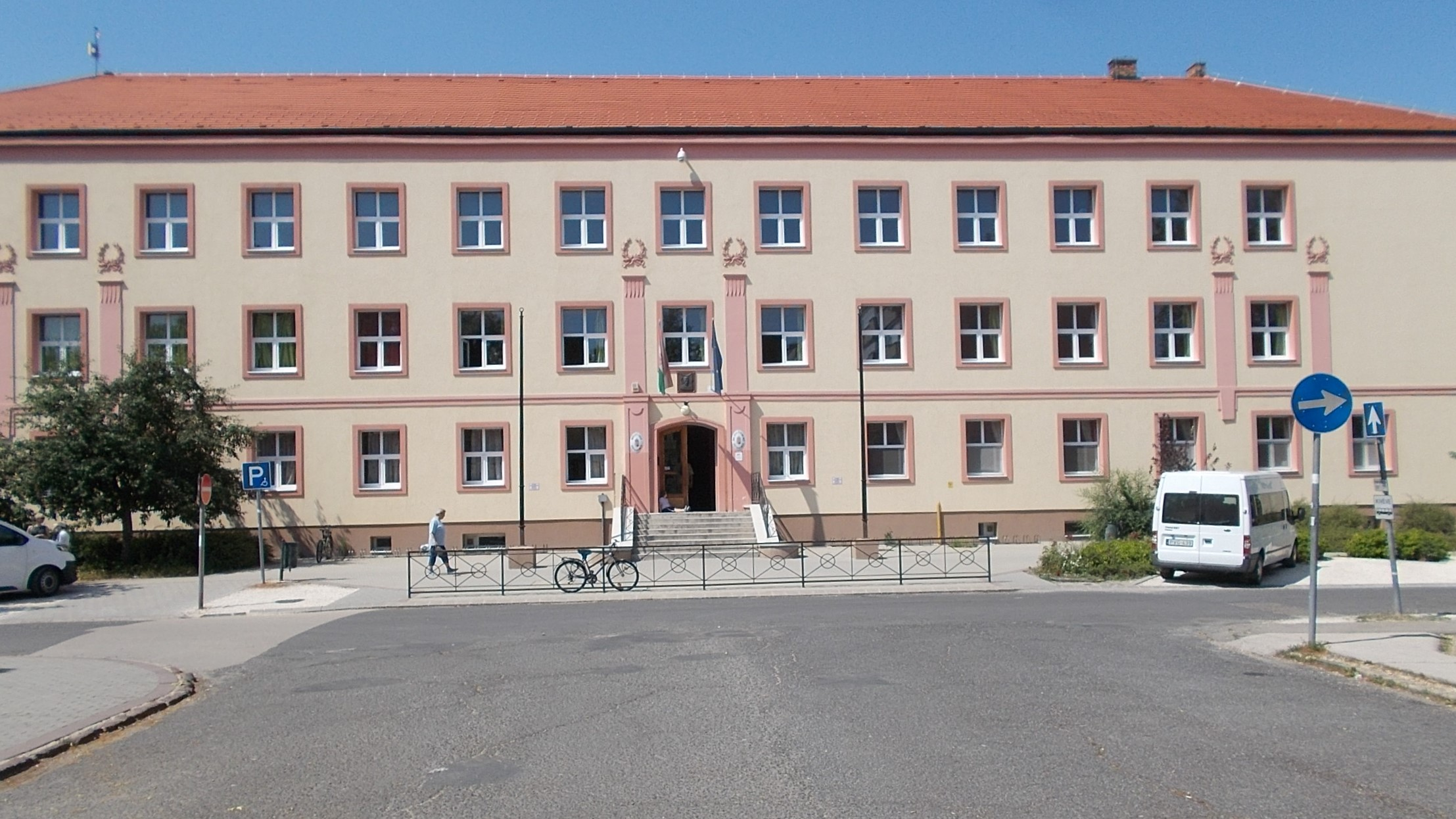
- The Radnóti Miklós Street site

Location
- Radnóti Miklós street 6. Szigetszentmiklós, Pest, 2310; Hungary
- Coordinates: 47.340717°N 19.038517°E

Information
- Former names: Primary School No. II, József Attila Primary School, József Attila Primary School and Basic Art Education Institution, József Attila Primary School and Basic Art School in Szigetszentmiklós
- Established: 1955, 2017
- School code: 203277
- Head of school: Lídia Szabó
- Teaching staff: 70
- Years offered: 8
- Average class size: 20
- Language: Hungarian, English, German
- Website: https://szigja.hu

The Attila József Primary School of Szigetszentmiklós (Szigetszentmiklósi József Attila Általános Iskola, often abbreviated: SZIGJA) is a school in Szigetszentmiklós, Pest county. Its namesake is the Hungarian poet Attila József. The school was founded in 1955. In September 2011, the school merged with the art education of Szigetszentmiklós. Since 2014, the school has been operating in a new headquarters building.

== History ==
The Miklós Elementary Art Education Institution was established in 2004 by the Art School Foundation. On 1. September 2011 the institution was merged into the school.

From January 2013, the school has a new owner, so its name has changed and it continues to operate under the name of Attila József Primary School and Elementary Art School of Szigetszentmiklós. As of September 2014, the school has been operating in a new headquarters building, while the old headquarters building continues to operate as a member school. In 2017, another institutional reorganisation took place, whereby the member school was spun off and continues to operate in the old buildings as Attila József Primary School of Szigetszentmiklós.

== External relations ==
The school has traditionally maintained good relations with all the kindergartens in Szigetszentmiklós. Every October, the teachers of the first grade allow the former kindergarten teachers of the large group to visit the class. The exchange of ideas with the teachers helps the kids to integrate into school life and provides the kindergarten teachers with information on the school's induction procedures and academic requirements. In November, the deputy head teacher for the lower classes gives a preliminary orientation to the large group. She gets to know the children and the methods of the sessions. She makes creative comments to help the kindergarten teachers before the start of the school year. In March, she visits the large groups to help the kindergarten teachers make decisions about school readiness.

In May, the first graders welcome the large group of kindergarteners, and the teacher gives a session that gives a positive insight into school life. At the last kindergarten parents' meeting, the school is represented on request by a junior deputy headteacher, who helps parents to solve problems before the start of the school year. The school also holds a parents' meeting for parents of prospective first-graders (who are already enrolled in our school).

The school maintains regular contacts with neighbouring secondary schools to help students succeed in their studies and in their admissions. Joint professional meetings are organised annually, and parents' meetings and visits are organised to help students choose a school. Teachers from the secondary schools participate in academic competitions.

They have a good relationship with the Catholic and Reformed Churches, and are in constant contact with other churches that teach in the school.

They have a regular working relationship:

- with the City Library and Community Centre
- with the Jenő Ádám Primary School and Primary Art School of Szigetszentmiklós
- the sports clubs
- the Patak Gallery
- the Amateur Artists Association
- the Sziget Theatre

== Management ==
- Béla Réti (1955-1956, 1957-1970)
  - made the institution one of the first schools in the county
- Antal Juhász (autumn 1956 to spring 1957)
  - acting headmaster
- Szilveszterné Mihály (1970-1977)
  - introduced the cabinet system of education, establishment of a base school
- Mihályné Sági (1977-1993)
  - set up language and vocal music sections
- Mrs Lajos Farkas (1993-1998)
  - extended the range of courses to develop manual activities
- Mrs Sándor Eszterhás (1998-2008)
  - established twinning links with Finnish and German schools
- Ibolya Zilling (2008-2017)
  - started art and Catholic classes
- Lídia Szabó (2018-)
  - separation of a member school, start of the old-new primary school

== Training ==
A primary school with 8 grades, a public education institution, an educational and teaching establishment.

== Famous students ==
- Mária Kutás - Youth Tournament Champion (1968 Mexico - 22nd place in the Pre-Olympics)
- Pál Lakatos - boxer, eleven-time Hungarian adult champion in the 48 kg weight category
- István Lózs - correspondent, WestelPress, Hungarian Television, TV2, RTL KLUB editor-reporter
- Attila Jószai - local politician
- János Bagócs - weightlifter, 1968 Mexican Olympics 5th place, European Champion 1970
- László Pelsőczy - actor
- Dr Gyula Török - nuclear physicist
- Dr Antalné Fodor - Deputy Mayor of Inselszentmiklós
- Atilla Ballai - sports journalist
- Zsolt Lettner - opera singer
