= Ryoichi Goto =

Japanese weightlifter

Personal information
- Nationality: Japanese
- Born: 18 July 1949 (age 75)

Sport
- Sport: Weightlifting

Ryoichi Goto (born 18 July 1949) is a Japanese weightlifter. He competed in the men's middle heavyweight event at the 1972 Summer Olympics.
