= Aimo Nieminen =

Finnish weightlifter (1940–2018)

Personal information
- Nationality: Finnish
- Born: 25 June 1940; Muurame, Finland
- Died: 1 April 2018 (aged 77); Jämsä, Finland

Sport
- Sport: Weightlifting

Aimo Nieminen (25 June 1940 – 1 April 2018) was a Finnish weightlifter. He competed in the men's middle heavyweight event at the 1972 Summer Olympics.
