= Natsagiin Ser-Od =

Mongolian weightlifter (born 1941)

Personal information
- Nationality: Mongolian
- Born: 26 April 1941 (age 83)

Sport
- Sport: Weightlifting

Natsagiin Ser-Od (born 26 April 1941) is a Mongolian weightlifter. He competed in the men's middleweight event at the 1972 Summer Olympics.
