= İsmail Bayram =

Turkish weightlifter (born 1954)

Personal information
- Nationality: Turkish
- Born: 1 June 1954 (age 70)

Sport
- Sport: Weightlifting

İsmail Bayram (born 1 June 1954) is a Turkish weightlifter. He competed in the men's middleweight event at the 1972 Summer Olympics.
