= Alfonso Rodríguez (weightlifter) =

Puerto Rican weightlifter

Personal information
- Nationality: Puerto Rican
- Born: 15 November 1948 (age 77)

Sport
- Sport: Weightlifting

Alfonso Rodríguez (born 15 November 1948) is a Puerto Rican weightlifter. He competed in the men's middleweight event at the 1972 Summer Olympics.
