= Yury Kozin =

Soviet weightlifter

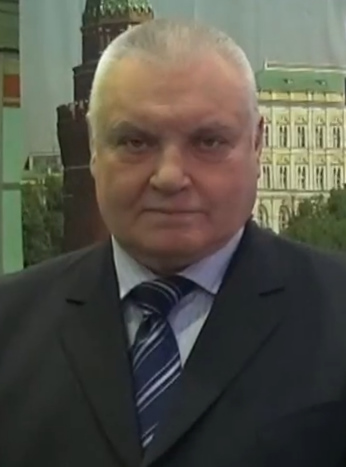
- Kozin in 2017

Personal information
- Born: 20 September 1948 (age 77) Moscow, Soviet Union

Sport
- Sport: Weightlifting
- Club: Dynamo Moscow
- Coached by: Vladimir Pushkarev
Medal record
Representing the Soviet Union
World Weightlifting Championships
| Gold medal – first place | 1971 Lima | -110 kg |

Yury Yevgenyevich Kozin (Russian: Юрий Евгеньевич Козин; born 20 September 1948) is a retired Soviet heavyweight weightlifter who won a Soviet and a world title in 1971 and set six ratified world records in 1970–72: five in the press and one in the clean and jerk.

Kozin graduated from the Russian State University of Physical Education, Sport, Youth and Tourism, and after retiring from competitions worked as a weightlifting coach. He prepared Valery Yurov to the 1990 World Championships.
