= Salvatore Laudani =

Italian weightlifter

Personal information
- Nationality: Italian
- Born: 9 December 1947; Catania, Italy
- Died: 22 January 2020 (aged 72)

Sport
- Sport: Weightlifting

Salvatore Laudani (9 December 1947 – 22 January 2020) was an Italian weightlifter. He competed in the men's middleweight event at the 1972 Summer Olympics.
