= Foreign exchange fraud =

Trading scheme used to defraud traders

Foreign exchange fraud is any trading scheme used to defraud traders by convincing them that they can expect to gain a high profit by trading in the foreign exchange market. Currency trading became a common form of fraud in early 2008, according to Michael Dunn of the U.S. Commodity Futures Trading Commission.

The foreign exchange market is at best a zero-sum game, meaning that whatever one trader gains, another loses. However, brokerage commissions and other transaction costs are subtracted from the results of all traders, making foreign exchange a negative-sum game.

== US government interventions ==
In August 2008, the CFTC set up a special task force to deal with growing foreign exchange fraud. In January 2010, the CFTC proposed new rules limiting leverage to 10 to 1, based on "a number of improper practices" in the retail foreign exchange market, "among them solicitation fraud, a lack of transparency in the pricing and execution of transactions, unresponsiveness to customer complaints, and the targeting of unsophisticated, elderly, low net worth and other vulnerable individuals".

In July 2013, Christopher Ehrman, an SEC veteran, was named director of the CFTC's Whistleblower Office.

== Types of fraud ==
Frauds might include churning of customer accounts for the purpose of generating commissions, selling software that is supposed to guide the customer to large profits, improperly managed "managed accounts", false advertising, Ponzi schemes, and outright fraud. It also refers to any retail forex broker who indicates that trading foreign exchange is a low risk, high profit investment.

== Increase in fraud ==
The U.S. Commodity Futures Trading Commission (CFTC), which regulates the foreign exchange market in the United States, has noted an increase in the amount of unscrupulous activity in the non-bank foreign exchange industry. By August 2008, the CFTC had filed nearly 100 enforcement actions over illegal forex futures and option contracts since the Commodity Futures Modernization Act was enacted in 2000. In those cases it had obtained judgments for restitution of investor losses totaling US$450 million.

== Not beating the market ==
The foreign exchange market is a zero-sum game in which there are many experienced, well-capitalized professional traders (e.g. working for banks) who can devote their attention full-time to trading. An inexperienced retail trader may have less access to information compared to these traders.

Retail traders are undercapitalized. Thus, they are subject to the problem of gambler's ruin: in a "fair game" (one with no information advantages) the player with the lower amount of capital has a higher probability of going bankrupt than a high-capital player. The retail trader always pays the bid/ask spread which makes their odds of winning less than those of a fair game. Additional costs may include margin interest or, if a spot position is kept open for more than one day, the trade may be "resettled" each day, each time costing the full bid/ask spread. In some variations of forex trading, the customers do not obtain normal fungible futures, but instead make a contract with some named company. Even if the company claims to act as their "forex dealer", it is financially interested in making the retail customer lose money. The contract is directly between the customer and the pseudo-dealer, so it is an off-exchange one; it cannot be normally registered and traded on futures exchanges.

Although it is possible for a few experts to successfully arbitrage the market for an unusually large return, this does not mean that a larger number could earn the same returns even given the same tools, techniques, and data sources. This is because the arbitrages are essentially drawn from a pool of finite size; although information about how to capture arbitrages is a nonrival good, the arbitrages themselves are a rival good. In analogy: the total amount of buried treasure on an island is the same, regardless of how many treasure hunters have bought copies of the treasure map.

== High leverage ==
By offering high leverage, some market makers encourage traders to trade extremely large positions. This increases the trading volume cleared by the market maker and increases their profit, but increases the risk that the trader will receive a margin call. While professional currency dealers such as banks and hedge funds tend to use no more than 10:1 leverage, retail clients may be offered leverage up to 1000:1.

== Notable cases ==
=== Turkey ===
On September 18, 2026, Turkish authorities announced that they had detained 191 people as part of an investigation into an international Forex fraud network operated by Israeli citizens. The group had set up companies that appeared to operate as call centers, consulting firms, and tourism companies. They used social media and various websites to advertise Forex and cryptocurrency investments, promising high returns. Turkish officials said the group had obtained more than $3 billion from victims, with the money kept in overseas bank accounts and cryptocurrency wallets.

== Fraud by country ==
To aid with transparency, some regulatory authorities openly publish the following: list of regulated companies/firms, warnings to regulated companies, cases opened against regulated companies, fines levied to regulated companies, revocation of companies license as well as general news announcements.

=== United Kingdom ===
The Financial Conduct Authority (FCA) website lists guides to aid with avoiding fraud/scams as well as public list of warnings recorded by the FCA.

- Official FCA Investment Firm Warning List
- Online guide on how to avoid scams
- FCA Guide on how to report a scam
- FCA Investment Scam support website
- FCA News on Investment Firms

=== Cyprus ===
The Cyprus Securities and Exchange Commission (CySEC) provides public access to information regarding the process for how to obtain a CIF authorisation as well as listing the current and past CySEC authorised companies.

- List of current 'Cyprus Investment Firms' (CIFs)
- List of former Cyprus Investment Firms
- List of issued CySEC Warnings
- List of announced Board Decisions (including fines)

== Convicted scammers ==
- Russell Cline
- Russell Erxleben
- Sterling Currency Group
- Joel N. Ward
- WinCapita

== See also ==
- Boiler room
- Bucket shop
- Foreign exchange market
- Forex scandal
- Fraud
- Gambler's conceit
- Gambler's ruin
- High-yield investment program
