= Leopold Herenčić =

Serbian weightlifter

Personal information
- Nationality: Serbian
- Born: 5 April 1948 (age 77); Odžaci, Yugoslavia

Sport
- Sport: Weightlifting

Leopold Herenčić (born 5 April 1948) is a Serbian weightlifter. He competed in the men's lightweight event at the 1972 Summer Olympics.
