= Rudolf Litsch =

Austrian weightlifter (born 1944)

Personal information
- Nationality: Austrian
- Born: 4 August 1944 (age 80)

Sport
- Sport: Weightlifting

Rudolf Litsch (born 4 August 1944) is an Austrian weightlifter. He competed in the men's middle heavyweight event at the 1972 Summer Olympics.
