= César Gaudin =

Puerto Rican weightlifter

Personal information
- Nationality: Puerto Rican
- Born: 16 December 1944; Ponce, Puerto Rico
- Died: 26 May 2000 (aged 55); Ponce, Puerto Rico

Sport
- Sport: Weightlifting

César Gaudin (16 December 1944 – 26 May 2000) was a Puerto Rican weightlifter. He competed in the men's middle heavyweight event at the 1972 Summer Olympics.
