= Leopold Pichler =

Austrian weightlifter

Personal information
- Nationality: Austrian
- Born: 29 July 1942 (age 82)

Sport
- Sport: Weightlifting

Leopold Pichler (born 29 July 1942) is an Austrian weightlifter. He competed in the men's middleweight event at the 1972 Summer Olympics.
