= Weightlifting at the 1972 Summer Olympics – Men's 56 kg =

Weightlifting at the Olympics

56 kg at the Games of the XX Olympiad
- Venue: Weightlifting Hall 7, Gewichtheberhalle
- Dates: 28 August
- Competitors: 24 from 20 nations

Medalists
1st place, gold medalist(s)		Imre Földi; Hungary
2nd place, silver medalist(s)		Mohammad Nassiri; Iran
3rd place, bronze medalist(s)		Gennady Chetin; Soviet Union

The favorites in the event were the same lifters that made up the first four places at the 1968 Summer Olympics. The snatch was won by Koji Miki of Japan with a lift of 112.5 kg. But in an out-of-competition attempt to break the world record, he improved his own mark from 113.5 kg to 114.0 kg. The lifter placing 12th, Soviet-born Israeli Ze'ev Friedman, would become one of the victims of the kidnapping by the Palestinian Black September group. Friedman was killed in the firefight at Fürstenfeldbruck Air Base.

== Results ==
Total of best lifts in military press, snatch and jerk. Ties are broken by the lightest bodyweight.

=== Final ===
Rank	Name	Nationality	Body weight	Military press (kg)				Snatch (kg)				Jerk (kg)				Total (kg)
Rank	Name	Nationality	Body weight	1	2	3	Result	1	2	3	Result	1	2	3	Result	Total (kg)
1st place, gold medalist(s)	Imre Földi	Hungary	55.70	120.0	~~127.5~~	127.5	127.5 = OR	102.5	107.5	~~110.0~~	107.5	137.5	~~142.5~~	142.5	142.5	377.5 WR
2nd place, silver medalist(s)	Mohammad Nassiri	Iran	55.90	120.0	125.0	127.5	127.5 OR	100.0	~~105.0~~	~~105.0~~	100.0	142.5	~~152.5~~	~~152.5~~	142.5	370.0
3rd place, bronze medalist(s)	Gennady Chetin	Soviet Union	55.65	115.0	~~120.0~~	120.0	120.0	100.0	105.0	107.5	107.5	140.0	~~150.0~~	~~150.0~~	140.0	367.5
4	Henryk Trębicki	Poland	55.70	~~117.5~~	117.5	122.5	122.5	102.5	~~107.5~~	107.5	107.5	135.0	~~140.0~~	~~140.0~~	135.0	365.0
5	Atanas Kirov	Bulgaria	55.70	112.5	117.5	~~120.0~~	117.5	97.5	102.5	105.0	105.0	135.0	140.0	~~145.0~~	140.0	362.5
6	George Vassiliadis	Australia	55.60	110.0	115.0	~~120.0~~	115.0	97.5	~~102.5~~	102.5	102.5	132.5	~~137.5~~	137.5	137.5	355.0
7	Hiroshi Ono	Japan	55.85	105.0	110.0	115.0	115.0	~~105.0~~	~~105.0~~	105.0	105.0	130.0	135.0	~~140.0~~	135.0	355.0
8	Georgi Todorov	Bulgaria	55.80	110.0	~~115.0~~	~~115.0~~	110.0	100.0	~~105.0~~	~~105.0~~	100.0	132.5	140.0	~~147.5~~	140.0	350.0
9	Precious McKenzie	Great Britain	55.20	110.0	115.0	~~117.5~~	115.0	92.5	97.5	~~100.0~~	97.5	125.0	130.0	~~132.5~~	130.0	342.5
10	Koji Miki	Japan	55.80	100.0	~~105.0~~	105.0	105.0	107.5	112.5	~~115.0~~	112.5	120.0	125.0	~~130.0~~	125.0	342.5
11	Victor Rusu	Romania	55.80	~~105.0~~	105.0	~~110.0~~	105.0	90.0	~~95.0~~	95.0	95.0	127.5	~~132.5~~	132.5	132.5	332.5
12	Ze'ev Friedman	Israel	55.80	~~97.5~~	97.5	102.5	102.5	~~97.5~~	97.5	102.5	102.5	120.0	125.0	~~130.0~~	125.0	330.0
13	Fernando Báez	Puerto Rico	55.90	~~110.0~~	110.0	120.0	120.0	85.0	~~92.5~~	~~92.5~~	85.0	~~122.5~~	122.5	~~127.5~~	122.5	327.0
14	Miguel Angel Medina	Mexico	55.95	~~112.5~~	~~112.5~~	112.5	112.5	~~92.5~~	92.5	97.5	97.5	110.0	~~115.0~~	115.0	115.0	325.0
15	Zulyn Dalkhjav	Mongolia	55.75	~~115.0~~	~~115.0~~	115.0	115.0	82.5	87.5	~~90.0~~	87.5	120.0	~~125.0~~	~~125.0~~	120.0	322.5
16	Gaetano Tosto	Italy	55.80	~~100.0~~	100.0	~~105.0~~	100.0	~~95.0~~	95.0	~~100.0~~	95.0	125.0	~~130.0~~	~~130.0~~	125.0	320.0
17	Siyannyambuugiin Dorjkhand	Mongolia	55.85	~~105.0~~	~~105.0~~	105.0	105.0	~~92.5~~	92.5	~~97.5~~	92.5	115.0	~~120.0~~	~~122.5~~	115.0	312.5
18	Arturo del Rosario	Philippines	55.80	92.5	~~97.5~~	~~97.5~~	92.5	~~87.5~~	87.5	~~92.5~~	87.5	122.5	~~132.5~~	~~132.5~~	122.5	302.5
19	Roberto Lindeborg	Netherlands Antilles	55.80	100.0	~~105.0~~	~~105.0~~	100.0	85.0	~~90.0~~	~~92.5~~	85.0	110.0	~~115.0~~	115.0	115.0	300.0
20	Samson Sabit Wanni	Sudan	56.00	100.0	105.0	107.5	107.5	75.0	~~80.0~~	~~80.0~~	75.0	~~105.0~~	105.0	110.0	110.0	292.5
21	Raúl Diniz	Portugal	55.30	~~85.0~~	85.0	98.0	95.0	70.0	77.5	~~82.5~~	77.5	105.0	112.5	~~117.5~~	112.5	285.0
–	Grzegorz Cziura	Poland	55.25	115.0	120.0	~~125.0~~	120.0	~~102.5~~	~~102.5~~	102.5	102.5	~~137.5~~	~~137.5~~	~~137.5~~	NVL	DNF
–	Anthony Phillips	Barbados	55.85	~~97.5~~	~~97.5~~	~~97.5~~	NVL									DNF
–	Jesús Conde	Mexico	55.95	~~112.5~~	~~112.5~~	~~112.5~~	NVL									DNF

Key: WR = world record; OR = Olympic record; DNF = did not finish; NVL = no valid lift
