= Wolfgang Faber =

German weightlifter

Personal information
- Nationality: German
- Born: 11 October 1943 (age 81); Rosenthal-Bielatal, Germany

Sport
- Sport: Weightlifting

Wolfgang Faber (born 11 October 1943) is a German weightlifter. He competed in the men's lightweight event at the 1972 Summer Olympics.
