= Jenő Ambrózi =

Hungarian weightlifter (born 1949)

Personal information
- Nationality: Hungarian
- Born: 1 August 1949 (age 77) Budapest, Hungary

Sport
- Sport: Weightlifting

Jenő Ambrózi (born 1 August 1949) is a Hungarian weightlifter. He competed in the men's lightweight event at the 1972 Summer Olympics.
