= Dietrich Leh =

German weightlifter (1943–2020)

Personal information
- Nationality: German
- Born: 17 April 1943; Friedrichsthal, Nazi Germany
- Died: 11 February 2020 (aged 76)

Sport
- Sport: Weightlifting

Dietrich Leh (17 April 1943 – 11 February 2020) was a German weightlifter. He competed in the men's middle heavyweight event at the 1972 Summer Olympics.
