= Joel N. Ward =

American fraudster

Joel Nathan Ward
- Born: 1959 (age 66–67); Modesto, California, U.S.
- Education: Beyer High School
- Occupation: Foreign currency trader
- Status: Released on 06/22/2015
- Conviction: August 2007
- Criminal charges: Fraud; money laundering
- Penalty: 9 years in Federal prison and 3 years of supervised release

Joel Nathan Ward (born 1959) is a former foreign currency trader, who has confessed to fraud and money laundering and was sentenced to nine years in Federal prison, plus three years of supervised release.

== Rise ==
Ward was born in Modesto, California. He graduated from Beyer High School, and attended a local community college, then worked in a series of jobs, including his father's construction firm. In the early 1990s he worked for an estate planning firm, where he became interested in foreign currency trading.

Ward learned to trade foreign currencies through a Sacramento, California forex school in late 1999. In 2003 he began teaching forex trading at the same school, named Learn:Forex. In March 2003, he launched the Joel Nathan Forex Fund (JNF), with $300,000 of investors' funds. In late 2004, Ward purchased the Learn:Forex school, and began speaking at investing conventions.

He gained some celebrity in financial markets, especially the foreign exchange market. Market Watch, the Wall Street Journal and other print and online news services publicized Ward's weekly comments on the forex exchange market. By 2005, Ward was handling more than $7 million in investors' funds.

Before his legal difficulties, he was quoted by the Financial Times about ethics in the foreign exchange market.

Joel Ward, who is president of Learn:Forex, an online currency trading institute, says it is disappointing that so many brokers have promoted foreign exchange as a get-rich-quick scheme and describes the leverage offered by some – as high as 400:1 – as "insane and not necessary".

Ward says his organisation seeks to educate investors about how the whole market works, from trading styles to what to watch out for with brokers. "The fact that you see a lot of brokers registered as National Futures Association members doesn't make this a regulated market, it's not," Ward notes.

He says the lack of regulation requires investors to do their own due diligence, making sure they deal with a highly capitalised broker offering a lot of transparency as to how it works. "I can count the number of reputable brokers on one hand," he says.

== Fall ==
Over his trading career, 110 people trusted Ward with $15 million of their money, with over $1 million taken in the final weeks of the scheme. Ward and his employees traded only $2 million of this money, losing $1.84 million. Twenty-two of the 24 accounts traded incurred losses, with the profits in the other two accounts amounting to less than $1,000 total. Ward used the rest of the money to pay himself a $180,000 annual salary, support his trading school business, stay at 5-star hotels at his "trading retreats," and pay out $3.7 million in "lulling payments" to investors who demanded money from their supposedly profitable trades. He also created fictitious Merrill Lynch account statements to show that one investor had an account balance of $9.5 million.

In August 2006, Washington Mutual Bank contacted the authorities with suspicions about Ward's banking activities. In November 2006 Ward emailed his investors, "There are no funds left in JNF as all monies have been misappropriated." In a handwritten confession that Ward gave his wife and that was later given to the FBI, Ward wrote of much personal distress and even the possibility of taking his own life over his guilt. In that context, he wrote that he "felt like a financial serial killer" and "just another scumbag con artist bilking old people out of their retirement money." He was later divorced.

In August 2007, Ward pleaded guilty to nine felony counts, including fraud and money laundering. The U.S. Attorney's office claimed that Ward defrauded more than 100 clients out of more than $11 million. Separately, Ward is alleged to have defrauded investors in a Mississippi real estate project.

Ward was sentenced to a 9-year prison term with a scheduled release date of February 24, 2016. "Joel Nathan Ward earned every minute of the nine-year sentence the court imposed. He brazenly defrauded scores of victims out of over $11 million," stated US Attorney Scott. Several victims spoke during the sentencing hearing, telling the judge about the financial devastation caused by Ward's conduct, and their hopes for restitution. In sentencing Ward, Judge Burrell stated that Ward "defrauded many people. He caused losses over $11 million, and many investors suffered devastating losses." Ward was also ordered to pay restitution in the amount of $11,275,501.53 and to serve three years of supervised release after the completion of his prison sentence. He was remanded into custody immediately following the sentencing hearing.

The defendant had proposed that he be allowed to remain out of prison while he attempted to generate funds by more trading in foreign exchange, in order to repay investors. According to Ward's former mother-in-law, 53 of the 92 defrauded investors supported the plan. Prosecutors responded that "Ward is continuing to con his victim investors by promoting the JNF Recovery Plan." In rejecting that plan, Judge Burrell stated that the "magnitude of his crimes, the manner in which the economic crimes were committed and concealed, and the duration of the criminal activities" required a lengthy prison sentence.

== See also ==
- Foreign exchange market
- Forex scam
