= Tore Bjørnsen =

Norwegian weightlifter

Personal information
- Nationality: Norwegian
- Born: 12 December 1943 (age 81); Stavanger, Norway

Sport
- Sport: Weightlifting

Tore Bjørnsen (born 12 December 1943) is a Norwegian weightlifter. He competed in the men's middleweight event at the 1972 Summer Olympics.
