= Zulyn Dalkhjav =

Mongolian weightlifter (born 1942)

Personal information
- Nationality: Mongolian
- Born: 16 October 1942
- Died: c. January 2021

Sport
- Sport: Weightlifting

Zulyn Dalkhjav (16 October 1942 – c. January 2021) was a Mongolian weightlifter and writer. He competed in the men's bantamweight event at the 1972 Summer Olympics.

After his weightlifting career, Dalkhjav became an author and one of Mongolia's most prominent writers of children's literature. He wrote a total of 24 books and had his works published in at least six different languages. He also contributed to several children's television shows.
