= Osman Mert =

Turkish weightlifter

Personal information
- Nationality: Turkish
- Born: 28 January 1948 (age 77)

Sport
- Sport: Weightlifting

Osman Mert (born 28 January 1948) is a Turkish weightlifter. He competed in the men's middle heavyweight event at the 1972 Summer Olympics.
