= Samson Sabit Wanni =

Sudanese weightlifter

Personal information
- Nationality: Sudanese
- Born: 1946 (age 78–79)

Sport
- Sport: Weightlifting

Samson Sabit Wanni (born 1946) is a Sudanese weightlifter. He competed in the men's bantamweight event at the 1972 Summer Olympics.
