= 1971 Asian Weightlifting Championships =

International weightlifting competition

The 1971 Asian Weightlifting Championships were held at the auditorium of the Far Eastern University in Manila, Philippines between October 9 and October 11, 1971. Weightlifters from seven countries Iran, Israel, South Korea, Philippines, Australia (as guest nation), Indonesia and Taiwan competed in the tournament.

== Medal summary ==
Event	Gold		Silver		Bronze	
Flyweight; 52 kg	Salvador del Rosario; Philippines	305.0 kg	Charlie Depthios; Indonesia	305.0 kg	Arturo Dandan; Philippines	295.0 kg
Bantamweight; 56 kg	Mohammad Nassiri; Iran	335.0 kg	Kang Shin-ho; South Korea	322.5 kg	Ze'ev Friedman; Israel	300.0 kg
Featherweight; 60 kg	Choi Mun-jae; South Korea	355.0 kg	Chung Young-duk; South Korea	345.0 kg	Amir Darmanaki; Iran	340.0 kg
Lightweight; 67.5 kg	Nasrollah Dehnavi; Iran	425.0 kg	Won Shin-hee; South Korea	420.0 kg	Madek Kasman; Indonesia	390.0 kg
Middleweight; 75 kg	Rudy Tilaar; Indonesia	357.5 kg	Reynaldo Madrid; Philippines	347.5 kg	Federico Ferrer; Philippines	345.0 kg
Light heavyweight 82.5 kg	Ebrahim Pourdejam; Iran	425.0 kg	David Berger; Israel	422.5 kg	Park Moon-soo; South Korea	407.5 kg
Middle heavyweight 90 kg	Ali Vali; Iran	435.0 kg	Oh Sik-kwan; South Korea	415.0 kg	Sutanto Hartono; Indonesia	350.0 kg
Heavyweight; 110 kg	Houshang Kargarnejad; Iran	472.5 kg	Yun Sook-woon; South Korea	465.0 kg	Nasser Doroudian; Iran	440.0 kg
Super heavyweight +110 kg	Abdul Rosjid; Indonesia	402.5 kg	Adnan Hodroj; Israel	390.0 kg	Akbar Shokrollahi; Iran	385.0 kg

== Medal table ==
Rank	Nation	Gold	Silver	Bronze	Total
1	Iran	5	0	3	8
2	Indonesia	2	1	2	5
3	South Korea	1	5	1	7
4	Philippines	1	1	2	4
5	Israel	0	2	1	3
Totals (5 entries)		9	9	9	27

== Team ranking ==
Rank	Team	Points
1	Iran	47
2	South Korea	36
3	Indonesia	32
4	Philippines	31
5	Israel	14
6	Republic of China	7
