= Rudolf Mang =

German weightlifter (1950–2018)

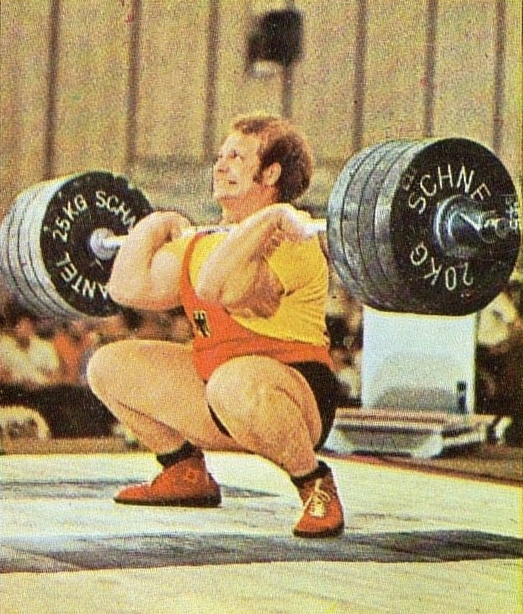

Personal information
- Born: 17 June 1950 Bellenberg, West Germany
- Died: March 12, 2018 (aged 67) Bellenberg, Germany
- Height: 180 cm (5 ft 11 in)
- Weight: 116–130 kg (256–287 lb)

Sport
- Sport: Weightlifting
- Club: Sportverein Bellenberg
Medal record
Men's weightlifting
Representing West Germany
Olympic Games
Silver medal – second place	1972 Munich	+110 kg
World Championships
Silver medal – second place	1973 Havana	+110 kg
European Championships
Bronze medal – third place	1971 Sofia	+110 kg
Silver medal – second place	1972 Constanta	+110 kg
Bronze medal – third place	1973 Madrid	+110 kg

Rudolf Mang (17 June 1950 – 12 March 2018) was a German heavyweight weightlifter. He competed at the 1968 and 1972 Olympics and placed fifth and second, respectively. Between 1971 and 1972 he won four more medals at the world and European championships and set two world records: one in the snatch and one in the press.

== Death ==
Mang died of a heart attack at his gym in Bellenberg, Germany on 12 March 2018. He was 67.
