= Rudolf Hill =

Austrian weightlifter

Personal information
- Nationality: Austrian
- Born: 14 March 1948 (age 77); Vienna, Austria

Sport
- Sport: Weightlifting

Rudolf Hill (born 14 March 1948) is an Austrian weightlifter. He competed at the 1972 Summer Olympics and the 1976 Summer Olympics.
