= Karl Utsar =

Estonian weightlifter (born 1945)

Karl Utsar (born 4 October 1945) is an Estonian weightlifter.

He was born in Väljaküla, Pärnu County.

He started his weightlifting exercising under the guidance of Karl Kiisa. He won a gold medal and two bronze medals at 1971 European Weightlifting Championships. In 1970 he won Soviet Union Championships. He is 6-times Estonian champion. 1970–1971 he was a member of Soviet Union national team, and 1964–1980 a member of Estonian national team.

In 2012 he was awarded the memorial medal of European Weightlifting Federation.
