= Pietro Masala =

German weightlifter

Personal information
- Nationality: German
- Born: 9 July 1944; Sennori, Italy
- Died: 2 February 1998 (aged 53)

Sport
- Sport: Weightlifting

Pietro Masala (9 July 1944 – 2 February 1998) was a German weightlifter. He competed in the men's lightweight event at the 1972 Summer Olympics.
