= Bellenberg =

- Municipality
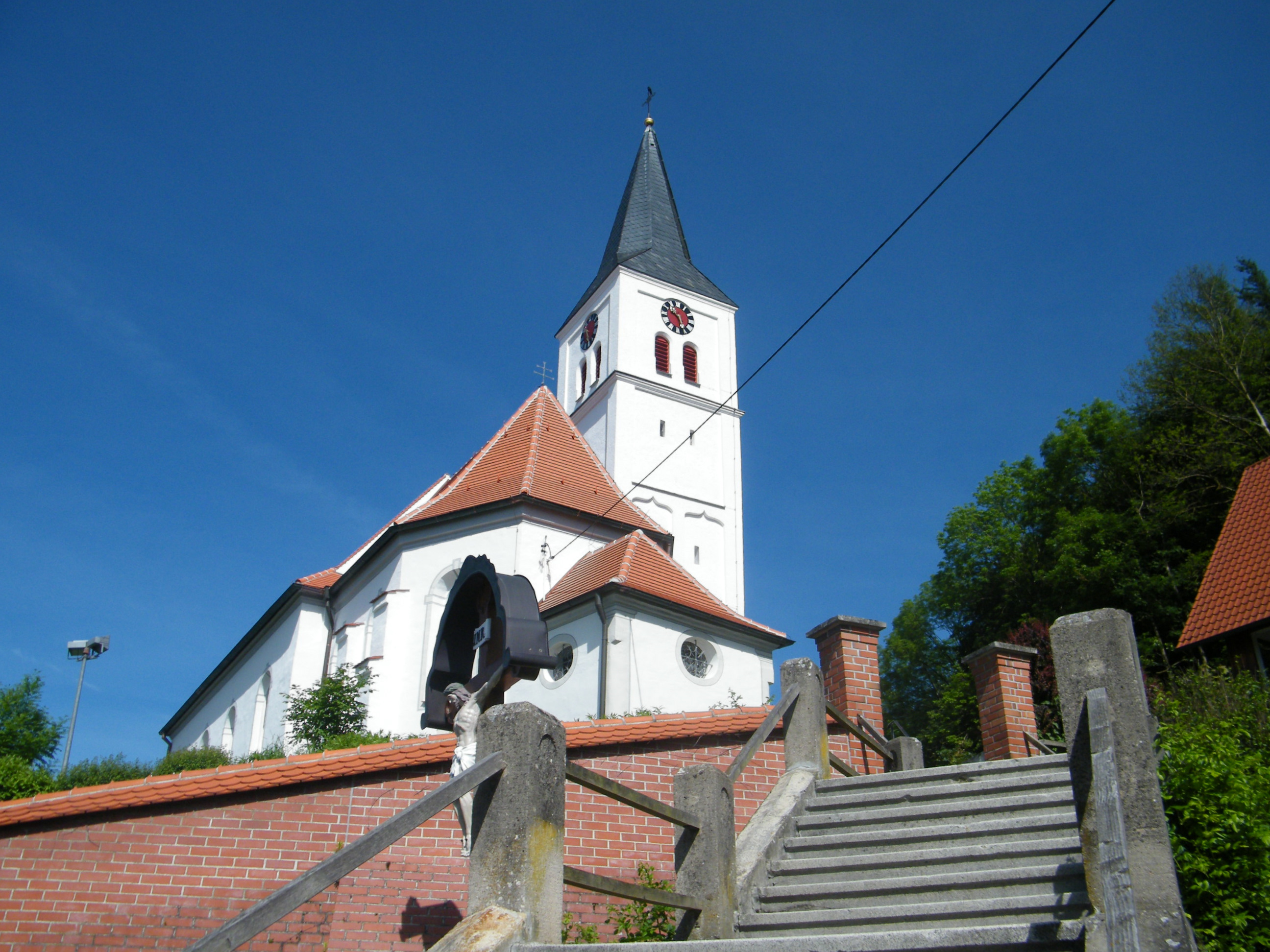
- Church of Saints Peter and Paul

- Coat of arms

- Location of Bellenberg within Neu-Ulm district
- Interactive map of Bellenberg
- Location within Germany Location within Bavaria
- Coordinates: 48°15′N 10°5′E
- Country: Germany
- State: Bavaria
- Admin. region: Schwaben
- District: Neu-Ulm

Government
  - Mayor (2021–27): Oliver Schönfeld (CSU)

Area
  - Total: 5.12 km^{2} (1.98 sq mi)
- Elevation: 504 m (1,654 ft)

Population (2025-12-31)
  - Total: 4,709
  - Density: 920/km^{2} (2,380/sq mi)
- Time zone: UTC+01:00 (CET)
  - Summer (DST): UTC+02:00 (CEST)
- Postal codes: 89287
- Dialling codes: 07306
- Vehicle registration: NU
- Website: www.gemeinde-bellenberg.de

Bellenberg (German pronunciation: [ˈbɛlənbɛʁk]) is a municipality in the district of Neu-Ulm in Bavaria in Germany.
