= Victor Rusu (weightlifter) =

Romanian weightlifter

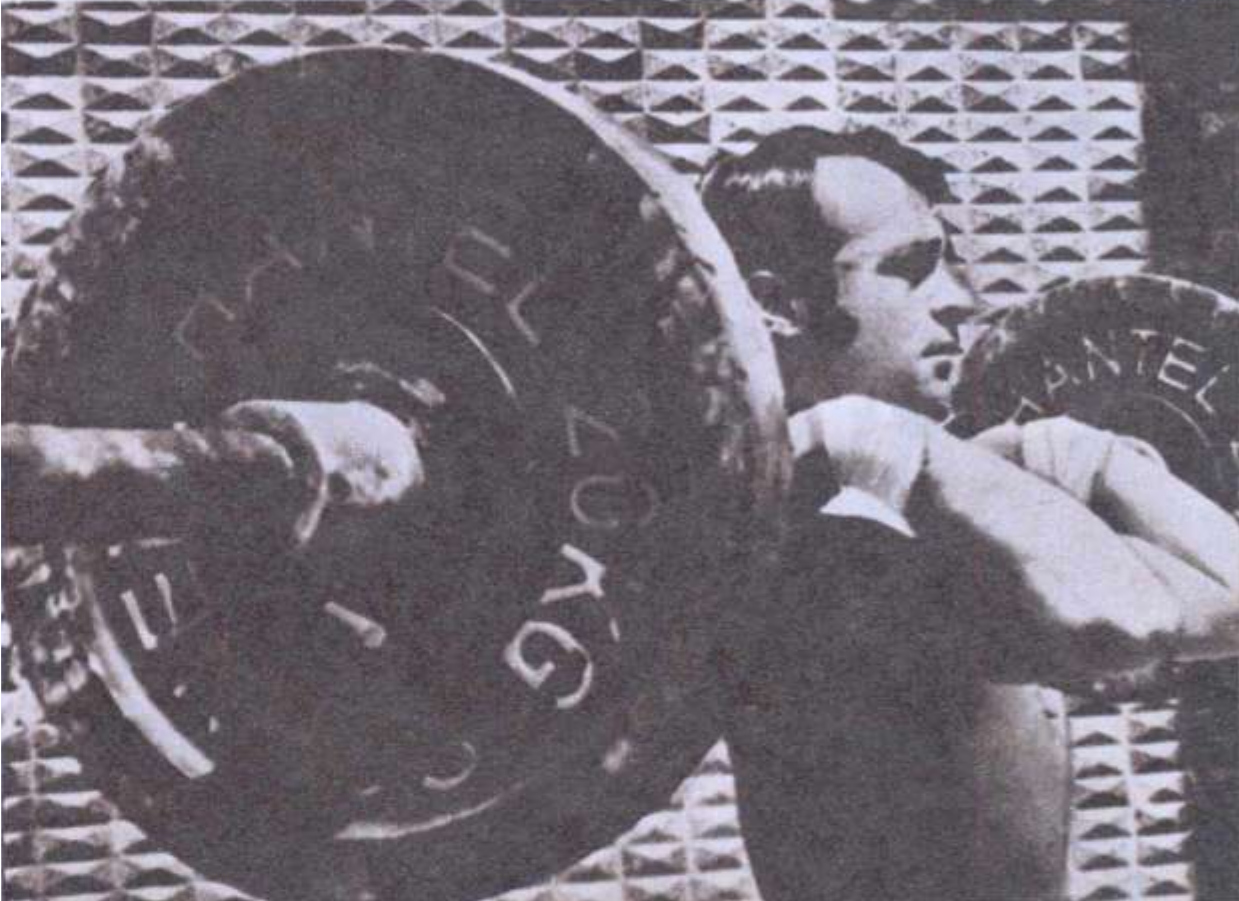
- Rusu in 1972

Personal information
- Nationality: Romanian
- Born: 23 August 1945 (age 80) Cluj-Napoca, Romania

Sport
- Sport: Weightlifting

Victor Rusu (born 23 August 1945) is a Romanian weightlifter. He competed in the men's bantamweight event at the 1972 Summer Olympics.
