= Atanas Shopov =

Bulgarian weightlifter (born 1951)

Personal information
- Born: 4 October 1951 (age 74) Pazardzhik, Bulgaria
Medal record
Men's weightlifting
Representing Bulgaria
Olympic Games
Silver medal – second place	1972 Munich	90 kg
Bronze medal – third place	1976 Montreal	90 kg
World Championships
Silver medal – second place	1972 Munich	90 kg
Bronze medal – third place	1976 Montreal	90 kg
European Championships
Silver medal – second place	1972 Constanța	90 kg
Bronze medal – third place	1971 Sofia	90 kg
Bronze medal – third place	1973 Madrid	90 kg
Pre-Olympic Tournament
Silver medal – second place	1972 Ulm	90 kg
Balkan Championships
Gold medal – first place	1970 Istanbul	90 kg
Gold medal – first place	1974 Burgas	90 kg
Gold medal – first place	1975 Sombor	90 kg
Silver medal – second place	1969 Bucharest	82,5 kg
Bulgarian Championships
Gold medal – first place	1970 Sofia	82,5 kg
Silver medal – second place	1972 Sofia	90 kg
Silver medal – second place	1973 Vidin	90 kg
Silver medal – second place	1975 Yambol	90 kg
Bulgarian Junior&Youth Championships
Gold medal – first place	1968 Burgas	82,5 kg
Silver medal – second place	1969 Asenovgrad	82,5
Silver medal – second place	1967 Dimitrovgrad	75 kg

Atanas Shopov (Bulgarian: Атанас Шопов; born 4 October 1951) of Bulgaria is a former weightlifter who competed at the 1972 Summer Olympics and 1976 Summer Olympics.

== Biography ==
He was born October 4, 1951, in Dobrovnitsa village near Pazardzhik. He won the silver medal in the 90 kg category at the 1972 Summer Olympics and the bronze at the 1976 Summer Olympics. He also won the bronze at the 1971 European Weightlifting Championships in Sofia, the silver at the 1972 European Championships, and the bronze at the 1973 European Championships. He began training in 1964. Until 1972 he competed for Benkovski Pazardzhik. Then until 1974 for CSKA Sofia, and then until 1976 again for Benkovski. He has set 15 world records for juniors.
