= Roberto Vezzani =

Italian weightlifter (born 1942)

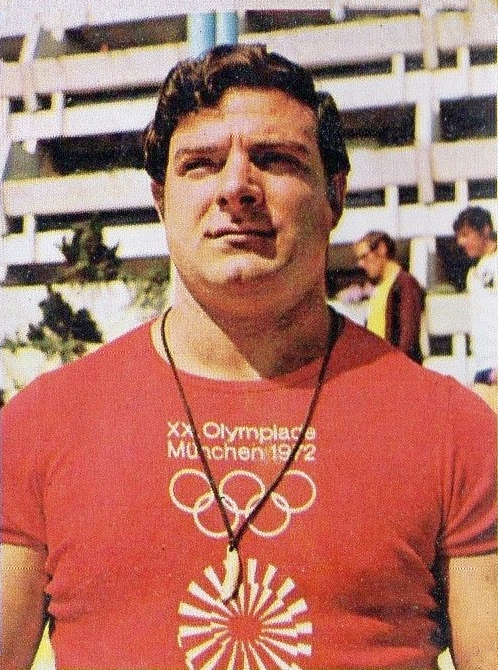

Personal information
- Born: 9 March 1942 (age 84) Pescia, Italy
- Height: 1.79 m (5 ft 10 in)
- Weight: 110 kg (240 lb)

Sport
- Sport: Weightlifting
- Club: G.S. Vigili del Fuoco, Firenze

Roberto Vezzani (born 9 March 1942) is a retired Italian heavyweight weightlifter. He competed at the 1972 Summer Olympics and finished in fifth place. Vezzani placed second-third in some individual events at the 1970, 1971 and 1972 world championships, but never won a medal in the overall competition.
