= Kaarlo Kangasniemi =

Finnish weightlifter (born 1941)

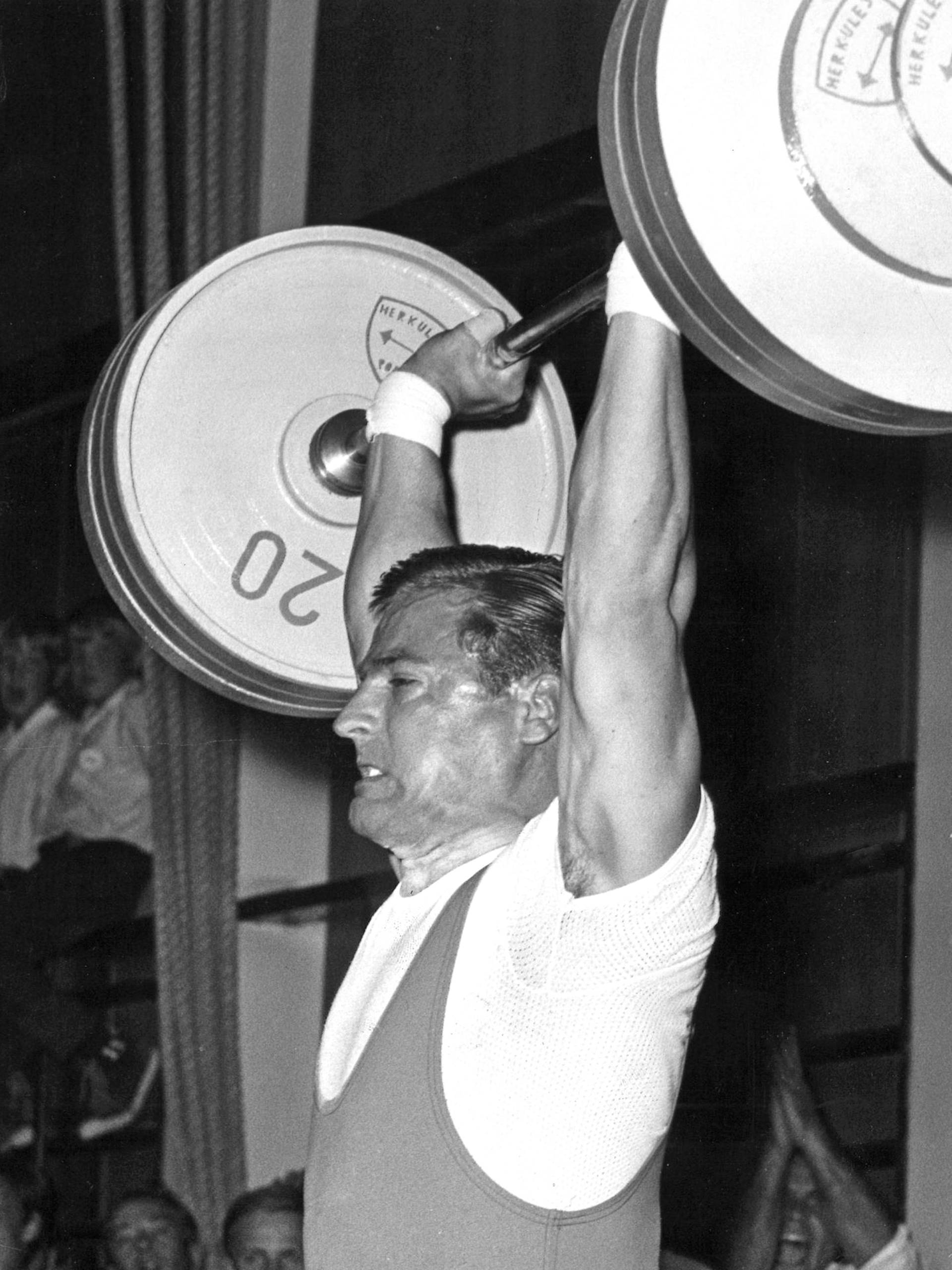
- 1968

Personal information
- Full name: Kaarlo Olavi Kangasniemi
- Born: 4 February 1941 (age 85) Kullaa, Finland
- Height: 174 cm (5 ft 9 in)
- Weight: 72–95 kg (159–209 lb)

Sport
- Sport: Weightlifting
Medal record
Men's weightlifting
Representing Finland
Olympic Games
Gold medal – first place	1968 Mexico City	-90 kg
World Weightlifting Championships
Gold medal – first place	1968 Mexico City	-90 kg
Gold medal – first place	1969 Warsaw	-90 kg
Silver medal – second place	1971 Lima	-82,5 kg
European Weightlifting Championships
Bronze medal – third place	1968 Leningrad	-90 kg
Gold medal – first place	1969 Warsaw	-90 kg
Gold medal – first place	1970 Szombathely	-90 kg
Bronze medal – third place	1972 Constanța	-82,5 kg

Kaarlo Olavi Kangasniemi (born 4 February 1941) is a retired Finnish weightlifter. Between 1968 and 1972 he won one Olympic, two world and two European titles in the 90 kg division, becoming the only Finnish weightlifter to win either an Olympic or world title. In the same period he set 16 ratified world records: four in the press, seven in the snatch and five in the total. He placed sixth at the 1972 Olympics and seventh in 1964. Kangasniemi was chosen as the world's best weightlifter in 1969 and as the Finnish Sports Personality of the Year in 1968 and 1969. After retiring from senior competitions in 1973 he worked as a weightlifting coach and weightlifting commentator with Eurosport; he continued competing in the masters category, winning a world title and setting a clean and jerk world record. In 1987 he was a candidate to the Parliament of Finland from the Finnish Rural Party, but was not elected. In 1998 he was inducted into the International Weightlifting Federation Hall of Fame.

Kangasniemi was born to a blacksmith and had seven brothers and three sisters. Four of his brothers were Finnish champions in weightlifting, and one, Kauko, competed at the Olympics. The Kangasniemi brothers had a rivalry at the national championships with the four Kailajärvi brothers.
