= Francisco Mateos =

Spanish weightlifter

Personal information
- Nationality: Spanish
- Born: 4 April 1947 (age 77); Seville, Spain

Sport
- Sport: Weightlifting

Francisco Mateos (born 4 April 1947) is a Spanish weightlifter. He competed at the 1972 Summer Olympics and the 1976 Summer Olympics.
