= Panagiotis Spyrou =

Greek weightlifter (born 1947)

Personal information
- Nationality: Greek
- Born: 24 May 1947 (age 77)

Sport
- Sport: Weightlifting

Panagiotis Spyrou (born 24 May 1947) is a Greek weightlifter. He competed in the men's middleweight event at the 1972 Summer Olympics.
