= Frank Rothwell (weightlifter) =

Irish weightlifter

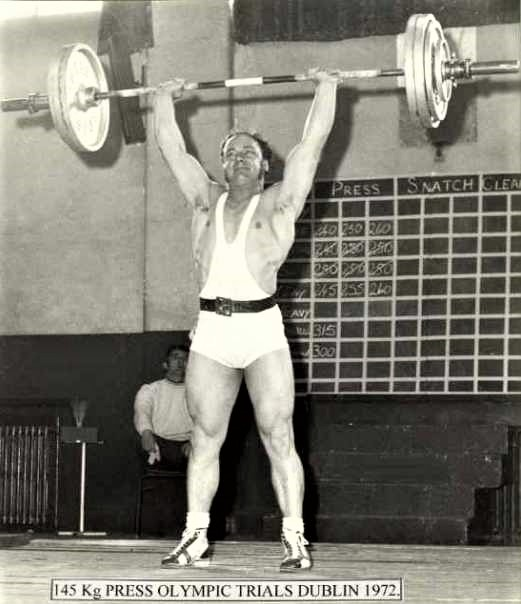
- Rothwell at the 145kg Olympic press lift trials, Dublin, 1972

Personal information
- Nationality: Irish
- Born: 16 June 1936 (age 89) Clonmel, Ireland

Sport
- Sport: Weightlifting

Frank Rothwell (born 16 June 1936) is an Irish weightlifter. He won eight All Ireland Weightlifting championships between 1963 and 1972. He competed in the men's middle heavyweight event at the 1972 Summer Olympics. He was an Olympic Torch Bearer during the 2012 Olympic Torch Relay for the London Olympic Games. He was the first Irish weightlifter to lift 300 pounds/ 136 kg in the Snatch lift. His best lifts were Press 150 kg, Snatch 140 kg and Clean andJerk 175 kg at 86 kg bodyweight. Over a period of 20 years he competed in three weight divisions,-75 kg, -82 kg and -90 kg. setting 43 All Ireland National Records in the process.
