= Kurt Pittner =

Austrian weightlifter

Personal information
- Nationality: Austrian
- Born: 5 March 1943 (age 82); Vienna, Austria

Sport
- Sport: Weightlifting

Kurt Pittner (born 5 March 1943) is an Austrian weightlifter. He competed at the 1968 Summer Olympics, the 1972 Summer Olympics and the 1976 Summer Olympics.
