= Anselmo Silvino =

Italian weightlifter

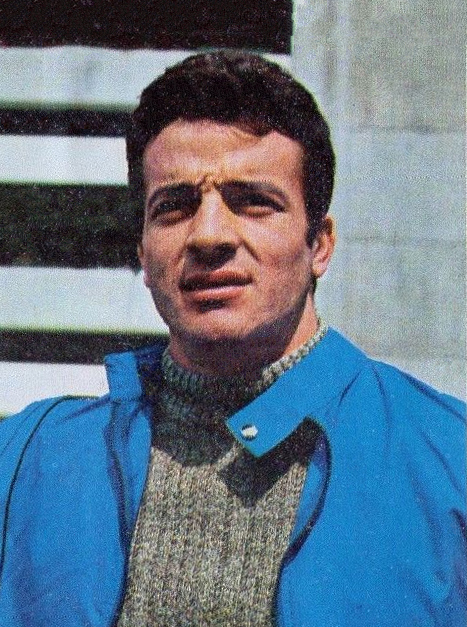

Personal information
- Born: 23 November 1945 (age 80) Teramo, Italy
- Height: 1.65 m (5 ft 5 in)
- Weight: 75 kg (165 lb)

Sport
- Sport: Weightlifting
- Club: G.S. Vigili del Fuoco, Teramo
Medal record
Representing Italy
Olympic Games
Bronze medal – third place	1972 Munich	middleweight
World Championships
Bronze medal – third place	1971 Lima	-75 kg
Bronze medal – third place	1972 Munich	-75 kg
European Championships
Bronze medal – third place	1972 Constanţa	-75 kg

Anselmo Silvino (born 23 November 1945) is a retired Italian middleweight weightlifter. He won bronze medals at the 1972 Summer Olympics, 1971 and 1972 world championships, and 1972 European Championships.
