= Nasrollah Dehnavi =

Iranian weightlifter (born 1950)

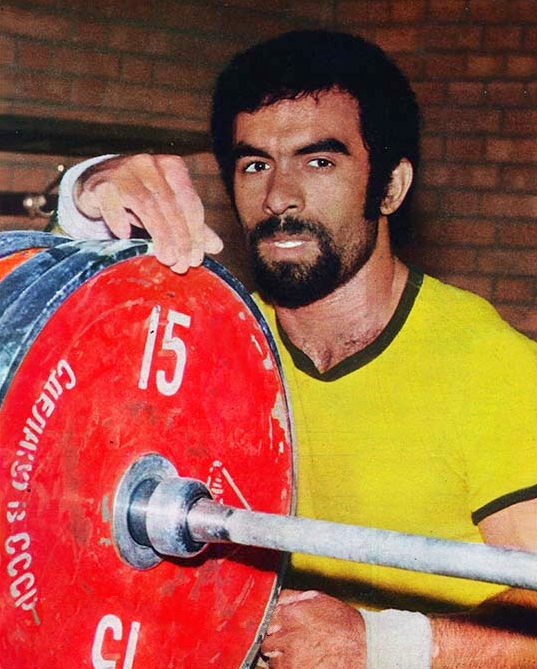

Personal information
- Born: 23 June 1950 (age 76) Masjed Soleiman, Iran
- Height: 165 cm (5 ft 5 in)
- Weight: 67.5 kg (149 lb)

Sport
- Sport: Weightlifting
- Club: Taj Ahvaz
Medal record
Representing Iran
World Championships
Bronze medal – third place	1974 Manila	67.5 kg
Bronze medal – third place	1970 Columbus	67.5 kg
Asian Games
Gold medal – first place	1970 Bangkok	67.5 kg
Silver medal – second place	1974 Tehran	67.5 kg
Asian Championships
Gold medal – first place	1971 Manila	67.5 kg
Silver medal – second place	1977 Baghdad	67.5 kg

Nasrollah Dehnavi (Persian:نصرالله دهنوی, born 23 June 1950 in Masjed Soleiman, Khuzestan, Iran) is a retired Iranian weightlifter. He competed in the 1968 and 1972 Olympics. He won a Bronze medal at the 1974 world championships and set one world Record in Press. Dehnavi now resides in Tehran, Iran

== Career ==
He has Participated in competitions 12 years as a member of Iran Weightlifting National Team. After finishing his career he was 14 years coached National Iran Weightlifting Team.

== Early life ==
He is also a member of Kharazmi University Science Board. These days Dehnavi is Supervisor of National Weightlifting Team from NOC of Islamic republic of Iran.

== Weightlifting achievements ==
=== World Weightlifting Championships ===
- 1969 Warsaw, Poland Lightweight: Press, Gold (140)
- 1970 Columbus, Ohio Lightweight: Total Bronze (420)
- 1971 Lima, Peru Lightweight: Press, Silver (140), Cl& Jerk, Silver (165)
- 1972 Munich, West Germany Lightweight: Press, Silver (150)
- 1974 Manila, Philippines Lightweight: Snatch Silver (130), Total Bronze (295)

=== Asian Games ===
- 1970 Bangkok Lightweight Gold Medal (425)
- 1974 Tehran Lightweight Silver Medal (290)

=== Asian Weightlifting Championships ===
- 1971 Manila, Philippines Lightweight: Gold (425)
- 1977 Baghdad Iraq Lightweight: Silver

Note:

- Olympic Games 1968, 1972 and 1976 counted as World Championships too.
- No medals for individual lifts before 1969.
- Press was removed from Olympic weightlifting after 1972.

== World Records ==
- Lift Type: Press, Result: 146 kg, Date: 11/11/1970, Weight Class: Lightweight (67.5 kg), Location: Teheran

== Participate in Olympics Games and results ==
- Mexico City 1968 Rank: 6th:
- Munich 1972 Rank: 5th:
