= Yordan Bikov =

Bulgarian weightlifter (born 1950)

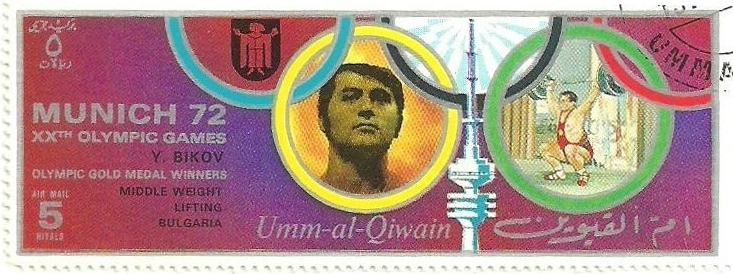
- Bikov on a stamp of Umm al-Quwain

Personal information
- Born: 17 November 1950 (age 75) Pazardzhik, Bulgaria
- Height: 168 cm (5 ft 6 in)
- Weight: 75 kg (165 lb)

Sport
- Sport: Weightlifting
- Club: Bulgarian Army
Medal record
Representing Bulgaria
Olympic Games
Gold medal – first place	1972 Munich	-75 kg
World Championships
Gold medal – first place	1972 Munich	-75 kg
European Championships
Gold medal – first place	1972 Constanța	-75 kg
Silver medal – second place	1973 Madrid	-75 kg

Yordan Bikov (Bulgarian: Йордан Биков, born 17 November 1950) is a retired Bulgarian middleweight weightlifter. He won the clean and jerk event at the 1971 World Championships. In 1972 he won the European title and Olympic gold medal, setting a new world record in the total. He retired next year after placing second at the European championships, and became a weightlifting coach.
