= Kailajärvi =

Kailajärvi is a Finnish surname that may refer to

- Jaakko Kailajärvi (born 1941), Finnish weightlifter
- Jouni Kailajärvi (born 1938–2003), Finnish weightlifter, brother of Jaakko
- Hannu Kailajärvi, Finnish businessman responsible for the WinCapita Internet-based Ponzi scheme
