= Andon Nikolov =

Bulgarian weightlifter (born 1951)

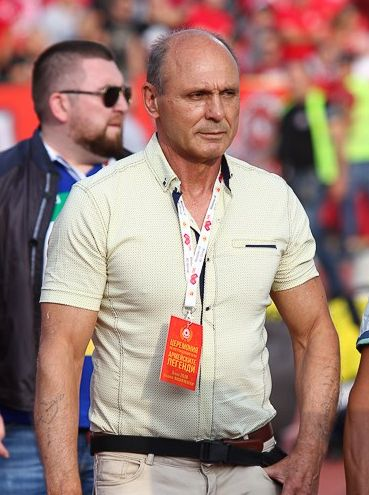
- Nikolov in 2018

Personal information
- Nationality: Bulgarian
- Born: 15 June 1951 (age 75)

Sport
- Sport: Weightlifting
Medal record
Men's Weightlifting
Representing Bulgaria
Olympic Games
| Gold medal – first place | 1972 Munich | 90 kg |

Andon Nikolov (Bulgarian: Андон Николов) (born 15 June 1951) is a former Bulgarian weightlifter. He became Olympic Champion in 1972 in the Middle Heavyweight class.
