= Leif Jenssen =

Norwegian weightlifter

Personal information
- Full name: Leif Gøran Jenssen
- Born: 19 March 1948 (age 78) Fredrikstad, Norway

Sport
- Sport: Weightlifting
Medal record
Men's weightlifting
Representing Norway
Olympic Games
Gold medal – first place	1972 Munich	−82.5 kg
World Championships
Silver medal – second place	1970 Columbus	−75 kg
Silver medal – second place	1971 Lima	−75 kg
Silver medal – second place	1974 Manila	−82.5 kg

Leif Gøran Jenssen (born 19 March 1948) is a former Norwegian weightlifter. He became Olympic Champion in 1972 in the light-heavyweight class. He obtained silver medal three times in the World Championships, in 1970s, 1971 and 1974. Jenssen was elected Norwegian Sportsperson of the Year 1971.

Until January 1973 use of anabolic steroids was not prohibited. Jenssen has been open about his use of steroids until the ban, including during the 1972 Olympics. He started using methandrostenolone prescribed by his general practitioner in 1970. He stated that he has no bad conscience about the use, as he estimates that 49 of 50 of the world's best weightlifters used steroids at the time. He regards it as impossible to have won the Olympic medal without use of the performance-enhancing drugs, but has stated that he believes that if no-one had used them, including himself, he would still have won.

Preceded by Stig Berge	Norwegian Sportsperson of the Year; 1971	Succeeded by Knut Knudsen
