= Kauko Kangasniemi =

Finnish weightlifter (1942–2013)

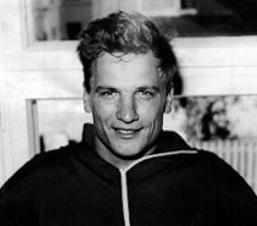

Personal information
- Born: 18 November 1942 Kullaa, Finland
- Died: 17 April 2013 (aged 70) Hämeenlinna, Finland
- Height: 177 cm (5 ft 10 in)
- Weight: 90–110 kg (198–243 lb)

Sport
- Sport: Weightlifting
Medal record
Representing Finland
World Weightlifting Championships
Bronze medal – third place	1969 Warsaw	-110 kg
European Weightlifting Championships
Silver medal – second place	1969 Warsaw	-110 kg
Bronze medal – third place	1972 Constanta	-110 kg

Kauko Kalevi Kangasniemi (18 November 1942 – 17 April 2013) was a Finnish heavyweight weightlifter. He competed in the 1968 and 1972 Summer Olympics and placed seventh on both occasions. Between 1969 and 1972 he won three medals at the world and European championships and set five world records in the snatch.

Kangasniemi was born to a blacksmith and had seven brothers and three sisters. Four of his brothers were Finnish champions in weightlifting, and one, Kaarlo, was a world and Olympic champion. The Kangasniemi brothers had a rivalry at the national championships with the four Kailajärvi brothers.
