= Vladimir Kanygin =

Russian weightlifter (1948–1990)

Personal information
- Born: 1948
- Died: 1990 (aged 41–42)

Sport
- Sport: Weightlifting
Medal record
Representing the Soviet Union
World Weightlifting Championships
Gold medal – first place	1971 Lima	Middleweight

Vladimir Aleksandrovich Kanygin (Russian: Владимир Александрович Каныгин, 19 September 1948 – 27 April 1990) was a Russian middleweight weightlifter. In 1971 he won a Soviet, a European and a world title.
