= Aimé Terme =

French weightlifter

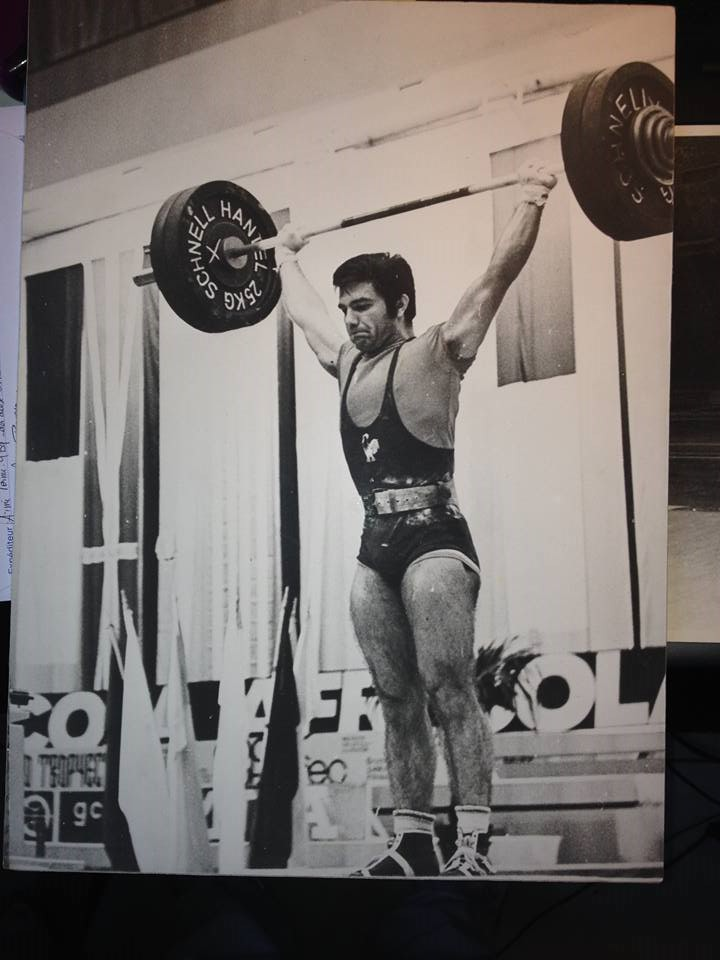

Personal information
- Born: 25 September 1945 (age 80)
- Height: 169 cm (5 ft 7 in)
- Weight: 75 kg (165 lb)

Sport
- Country: France
- Sport: Weightlifting
- Weight class: 75 kg
- Team: National team

Aimé Terme (born 25 September 1945) is a weightlifter, who competed in the 75 kg category and represented France at international competitions. He participated at the 1972 Summer Olympics in the 75 kg event.
