= Dino Turcato =

Italian weightlifter (1946–2026)

Personal information
- Nationality: Italian
- Born: 27 July 1946 Santa Maria di Sala, Italy
- Died: 22 January 2026 (aged 79)

Sport
- Sport: Weightlifting

Dino Turcato (27 July 1946 – 22 January 2026) was an Italian weightlifter. He competed in the men's light heavyweight event at the 1972 Summer Olympics. Turcato died on 22 January 2026, at the age of 79.
