= János Benedek =

Hungarian weightlifter

Medal record

Men's weightlifting

Representing Hungary

Olympic Games
Bronze medal – third place	1972 Munich	featherweight

János Benedek (born 20 November 1944 in Kiskunmajsa) is a Hungarian former weightlifter who competed in the 1968 Summer Olympics and in the 1972 Summer Olympics.
