= Aleksandar Kraychev =

Bulgarian weightlifter (born 1951)

Personal information
- Born: 28 October 1951 (age 74)
Medal record
Men's weightlifting
Representing Bulgaria
Olympic Games
Silver medal – second place	1972 Munich	heavyweight

Aleksandar Kraychev (Bulgarian: Александър Крайчев) (born 28 October 1951) is a Bulgarian former Olympicweightlifter who competed in the 1972 Summer Olympics. and won silver medal. It was the first ever Olympic medal for the city of Sliven, Bulgaria.
