= Imre Földi =

Hungarian weightlifter (1938–2017)

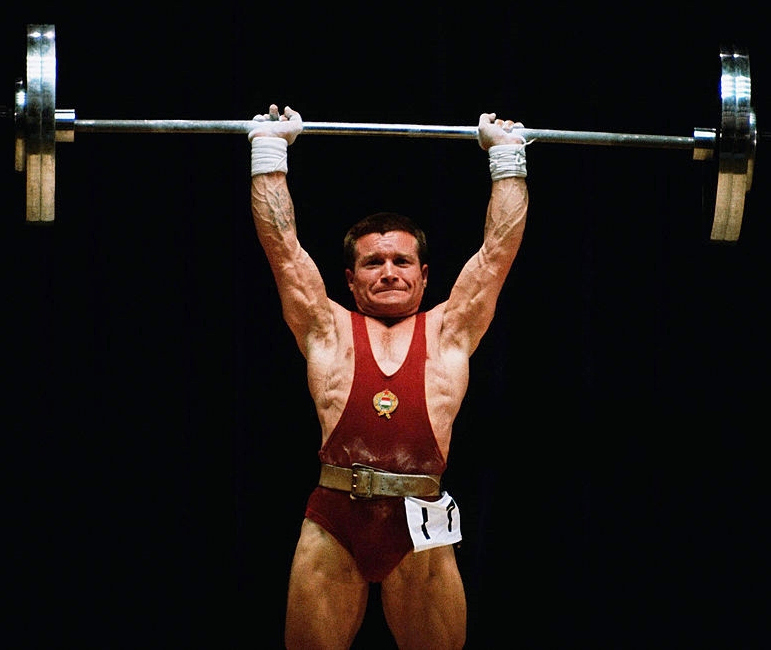
- Imre Földi at the 1964 Olympics

Personal information
- Nationality: Hungarian
- Born: 8 May 1938 Kecskemét, Hungary
- Died: 23 April 2017 (aged 78) Tatabánya, Hungary
- Occupation: Locksmith
- Height: 1.50 m (4 ft 11 in)
- Weight: 56 kg (123 lb)

Sport
- Country: Hungary
- Sport: Weightlifting
- Club: Tatabányai Bányász
- Turned pro: 1955
- Retired: 1978
Medal record
Representing Hungary
Olympic Games
Silver medal – second place	1964 Tokyo	-56 kg
Silver medal – second place	1968 Mexico City	-56 kg
Gold medal – first place	1972 Munich	-56 kg
World Championships
Bronze medal – third place	1959 Warsaw	-56 kg
Silver medal – second place	1961 Vienna	-56 kg
Silver medal – second place	1962 Budapest	-56 kg
Bronze medal – third place	1963 Stockholm	-60 kg
Silver medal – second place	1964 Tokyo	-56 kg
Gold medal – first place	1965 Tehran	-56 kg
Silver medal – second place	1966 East Berlin	-56 kg
Silver medal – second place	1968 Mexico City	-56 kg
Gold medal – first place	1972 Munich	-56 kg
European Championships
Bronze medal – third place	1959 Warsaw	-56 kg
Silver medal – second place	1960 Milan	-56 kg
Silver medal – second place	1961 Vienna	-56 kg
Gold medal – first place	1962 Budapest	-56 kg
Gold medal – first place	1963 Stockholm	-56 kg
Silver medal – second place	1965 Sofia	-56 kg
Silver medal – second place	1966 Berlin	-56 kg
Gold medal – first place	1968 Leningrad	-56 kg
Gold medal – first place	1970 Szombathely	-56 kg
Gold medal – first place	1971 Sofia	-56 kg
- Updated on 23 August 2014

Imre Földi (Hungarian pronunciation: [ˈimrɛ ˈføldi]; 8 May 1938 – 23 April 2017) was a Hungarian weightlifter. Competing at a record of five Olympic Games, he won a gold medal in 1972 and silver medals in 1964 and 1968.

During his career he set 21 world records, and after his retirement he coached his daughter to become a European champion. Földi earned numerous awards for his results and achievements, most notably he was named Weightlifter of the Century by the International Weightlifting Federation and was elected for Sportsperson of the Nation in Hungary.

== Early life ==
Born in Kecskemét, Hungary, Földi lived in his hometown until he turned 17 as a half-orphan after he lost his mother in World War II. Subsequently, he moved to Tata to work as a hewer. His outstanding power was soon noticed and he became a weightlifter of Tatabányai Bányász.

In the same time, thanks to his coach's influence he was not allowed to work down in the mine anymore to prevent him from possible mining accidents.

== Career ==
Földi first participated at miners' championships and in 1957 he already won his first Hungarian National Championships title. Two years later he took part in his first major international event, the 1959 World Weightlifting Championships, where placed third in bantamweight. He won his first title at the 1962 European Championships, held in front of a home crowd in Budapest. Until 1971 he added four more golds to his medals tally (1963, 1968, 1970, 1971). Földi won a silver medal at the 1970 World Championships, but this result was annulled after a positive doping test.

After winning three world championships silver medals in a row, Földi finally won the world title in 1965, an achievement he repeated in 1972. He participated at his first Olympics in 1960, where he finished sixth. This was followed by two close silver medals. In 1964 he fell short to Aleksey Vakhonin after a dramatic battle. Földi had a lead of 2.5 kg after snatch and clean and press and when he set a new world record in clean and jerk (135 kg) he was already celebrated as winner. However, Vakhonin lifted 142.5 kg thus beating Földi by 2.5 kg and pushing him to the second place.

Four year later at the 1968 Summer Olympics in Mexico City Földi came even closer to the gold, losing only on body weight – both him and his opponent Mohammad Nassiri ended with an overall result of 367.5 kg, which was a new world record; however, Nassiri was 300 grams lighter thus he was awarded the Olympic title.

Földi eventually reached the top in 1972 when he won the Olympic gold medal – and doubled it as a World Championships title – in front of his main opponent Nassiri. In the press, both Földi and Nassiri lifted 127.5 kg for a tied Olympic record. In the snatch, Földi raised 107.5 kg and built up a slight advantage over Nassiri (105.0 kg). In his first clean & jerk attempt, Nassiri raised 142.5 kg, 5 kg better than Földi; he next tried 152.5 kg, bit failed all of his remaining attempts. Földi, on the other hand, lifted 142.5 kg, setting a world record in the total at 377.5 kg and winning the gold medal.

Földi made his final Olympic appearance in 1976 in Montreal, where he became the first weightlifter to compete in five Olympics, a record that would only be matched by Germans Ingo Steinhofel and Ronny Weller 28 years later.

Aged 38, he placed fifth. Following an injury next year he ended his career, during which he set 21 world and 50 national records, and collected 13 national titles.

== Later life and recognition ==
After his retirement, Földi remained loyal to Tatabánya, his only club during his active career, and took a coaching position. His daughter Csilla Földi became a European champion in weightlifting.

Földi's achievements were recognized already during his career, as he was awarded the Silver Badge of the Order of Labour, an order in the Communist Hungary in 1962 and 1964. In 1972, the year he became Olympic champion, he was given the Golden Badge of the Order of Labour. In 1993 he was inducted to the International Weightlifting Federation Hall of Fame.

In the same year he was awarded the Middle Cross of the Order of Merit of the Republic of Hungary, just to receive the Officer's Cross of the same decoration a year later.

In 2000 he was voted Weightlifter of the Century in Hungary, and in 2005 he earned the same recognition of the International Weightlifting Federation as well. In 2003 he became honorary citizen of Tatabánya, and since 2009 the local sports hall also bears his name. In 2013, the Imre Földi Sports Scholarship was created in order to support Tatabánya-based top athletes.

On 31 January 2007, following the death of Ferenc Puskás, Földi was elected a Sportsperson of the Nation (A Nemzet Sportolója), which is a special Hungarian honor that can only be held by 12 people at one time. It is awarded for those of Hungarian sportspeople over 60, who have produced outstanding achievements during their active career and played a key role in the domestic sports after their retirement as well.
