= Hans Bettembourg =

Swedish weightlifter

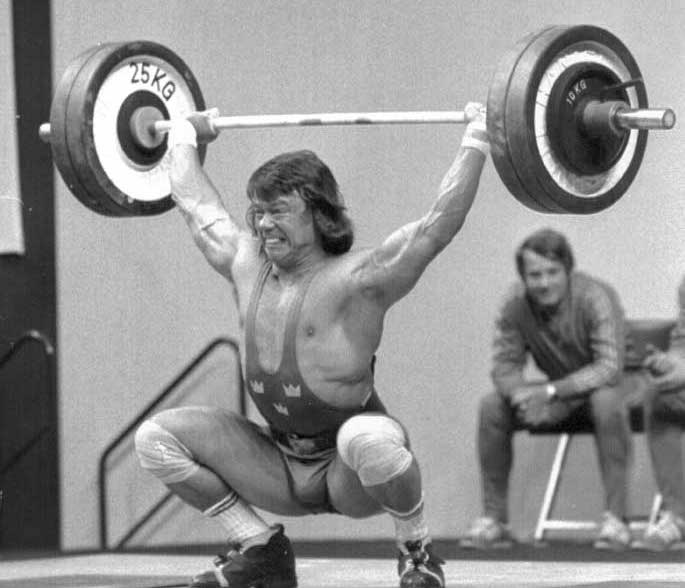
- Bettembourg at the 1972 Olympics

Personal information
- Born: 28 March 1944 (age 82) Neuruppin, Germany

Sport
- Sport: Weightlifting
Medal record
Representing Sweden
Olympic Games
Bronze medal – third place	1972 Munich	-90 kg

Hansjörg "Hans" Bettembourg (born 28 March 1944) is a Swedish former weightlifter who won a bronze medal in the 90 kg division at the 1972 Summer Olympics. At the world championships he placed eighth in 1969 and sixth in 1971. Between 1969 and 1972 he set 11 world records in the press.

Bettembourg was born in Germany in 1944, and moved to Sweden in 1963.
