= Stefan Grützner =

German weightlifter

Olympic medal record

Men's weightlifting

Representing East Germany
| Bronze medal – third place | 1972 Munich | heavyweight |

Stefan Grützner (born 29 June 1948 in Chemnitz) is an East German former weightlifter who competed in the 1972 Summer Olympics.
