= Sándor Holczreiter =

Hungarian weightlifter (1946–1999)

Olympic medal record

Men's weightlifting

Representing Hungary
| Bronze medal – third place | 1972 Munich | flyweight |

Sándor Holczreiter (18 July 1946 in Füzesabony – 14 December 1999 in Tatabánya) was a Hungarian weightlifter who competed in the 1972 Summer Olympics.
