= György Horváth =

Hungarian weightlifter

Olympic medal record

Men's weightlifting

Representing Hungary
Bronze medal – third place	1972 Munich	light-heavyweight

György Horvath (21 December 1943 – 17 October 1988) was a Hungarian weightlifter who competed in the 1972 Summer Olympics.
