= Mladen Kuchev =

Bulgarian weightlifter (born 1947)

Olympic medal record

Men's weightlifting

Representing Bulgaria
Silver medal – second place	1972 Munich	lightweight

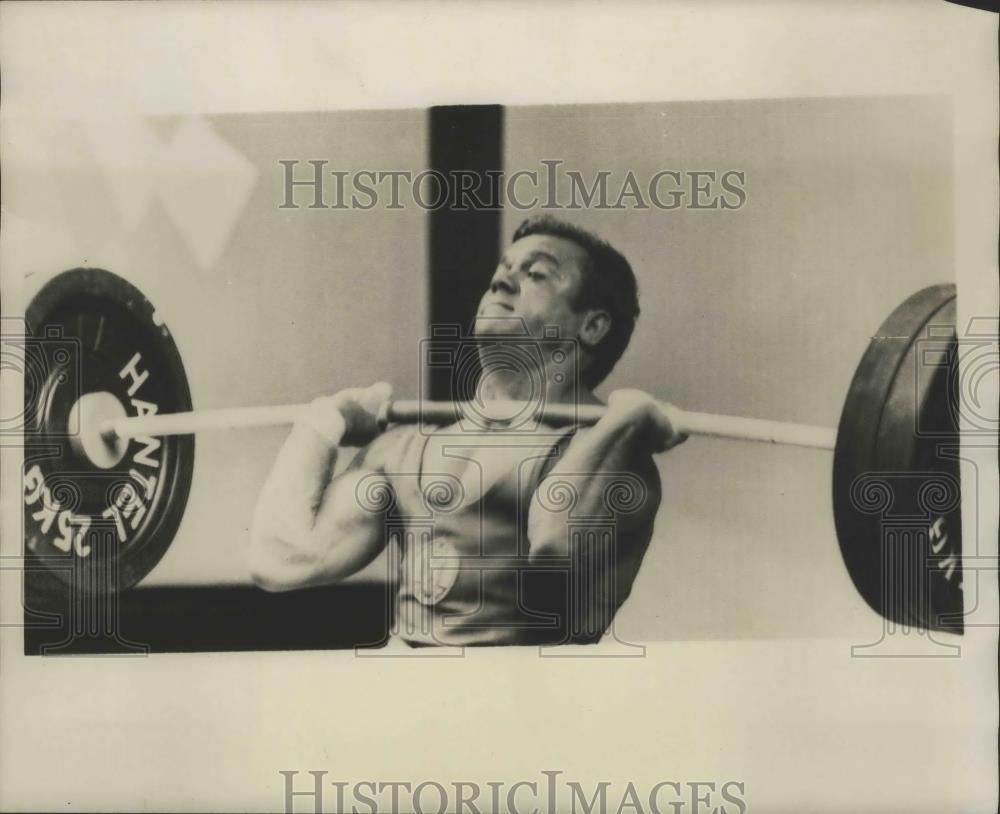

Mladen Kuchev (Bulgarian: Младен Кучев; born 29 January 1947) is a Bulgarian former weightlifter who competed in the 1968 Summer Olympics and in the 1972 Summer Olympics.
