= List of Asian Games medalists in weightlifting =

This is the complete list of Asian Games medalists in weightlifting from 1951 to 2026.

== Men ==
=== Flyweight ===
- 52 kg: 1958–1990
- 54 kg: 1994

Games	Gold	Silver	Bronze
1958 Tokyo	Lee Jang-woo (KOR)	Esmaeil Elmkhah (IRN)	Keiji Hagio (JPN)
1966 Bangkok	Chaiya Sukchinda (THA)	Tetsuhide Sasaki (JPN)	Mohammad Nasehi (IRN)
1970 Bangkok	Takeshi Horikoshi (JPN)	Salvador del Rosario (PHI)	Mohammad Nasehi (IRN)
1974 Tehran	Mohammad Nassiri (IRN)	Aung Gyi (BIR)	Masatomo Takeuchi (JPN)
1978 Bangkok	Han Gyong-si (PRK)	Im Jung-gwan (PRK)	Cai Juncheng (CHN)
1982 New Delhi	Kazushito Manabe (JPN)	Cai Juncheng (CHN)	Maman Suryaman (INA)
1986 Seoul	He Zhuoqiang (CHN)	Kazushito Manabe (JPN)	Gurunathan Muthuswamy (IND)
1990 Beijing	He Zhuoqiang (CHN)	Zhang Shoulie (CHN)	Kim Myong-sik (PRK)
1994 Hiroshima	Lan Shizhang (CHN)	Yang Bin (CHN)	Toshiyuki Notomi (JPN)

=== Bantamweight ===
- 56 kg: 1951–1990
- 59 kg: 1994
- 56 kg: 1998–2018
- 61 kg: 2022
- 60 kg: 2026–

Games	Gold	Silver	Bronze
1951 New Delhi	Mahmoud Namjoo (IRN)	Ali Mirzaei (IRN)	Pedro Landero (PHI)
1954 Manila	Yu In-ho (KOR)	Rodolfo Caparas (PHI)	Yoshio Nanbu (JPN)
1958 Tokyo	Shigeo Kogure (JPN)	Mahmoud Namjoo (IRN)	Alberto Nogar (PHI)
1966 Bangkok	Mohammad Nassiri (IRN)	Chua Phung Kim (SIN)	Yu In-ho (KOR)
1970 Bangkok	Mohammad Nassiri (IRN)	Kenkichi Ando (JPN)	Choi Mun-jae (KOR)
1974 Tehran	Kenkichi Ando (JPN)	Chen Manlin (CHN)	Han Gyong-si (PRK)
1978 Bangkok	Yang Eui-yong (PRK)	Lee Myung-su (KOR)	Muhammad Manzoor (PAK)
1982 New Delhi	Wu Shude (CHN)	Yang Eui-yong (PRK)	Chang Je-hwan (PRK)
1986 Seoul	He Yingqiang (CHN)	Zeng Guoqiang (CHN)	Dirdja Wihardja (INA)
1990 Beijing	Chun Byung-kwan (KOR)	Liu Shoubin (CHN)	Luo Jianming (CHN)
1994 Hiroshima	Chun Byung-kwan (KOR)	Tang Lingsheng (CHN)	Hiroshi Ikehata (JPN)
1998 Bangkok	Lan Shizhang (CHN)	Wang Shin-yuan (TPE)	Mehdi Panzvan (IRI)
2002 Busan	Wu Meijin (CHN)	Wang Shin-yuan (TPE)	Yang Chin-yi (TPE)
2006 Doha	Li Zheng (CHN)	Hoàng Anh Tuấn (VIE)	Lee Jong-hoon (KOR)
2010 Guangzhou	Wu Jingbiao (CHN)	Cha Kum-chol (PRK)	Jadi Setiadi (INA)
2014 Incheon	Om Yun-chol (PRK)	Thạch Kim Tuấn (VIE)	Wu Jingbiao (CHN)
2018 Jakarta–Palembang	Om Yun-chol (PRK)	Thạch Kim Tuấn (VIE)	Surahmat Wijoyo (INA)
2022 Hangzhou	Li Fabin (CHN)	Pak Myong-jin (PRK)	Kim Chung-guk (PRK)
2026 Aichi–Nagoya	Yang Yang (CHN)	Pang Un-chol (PRK)	Theerapong Silachai (THA)

=== Featherweight ===
- 60 kg: 1951–1990
- 64 kg: 1994
- 62 kg: 1998–2018
- 67 kg: 2022
- 65 kg: 2026–

Games	Gold	Silver	Bronze
1951 New Delhi	Jafar Salmasi (IRN)	Rodrigo del Rosario (PHI)	Yukio Iguchi (JPN)
1954 Manila	Nil Tun Maung (BIR)	Rodrigo del Rosario (PHI)	Chay Weng Yew (SIN)
1958 Tokyo	Lee Taik-yong (KOR)	Ali Safa-Sonboli (IRN)	Fumio Takeda (JPN)
1966 Bangkok	Yoshinobu Miyake (JPN)	Ahn Jong-chul (KOR)	Chang Ming-chung (ROC)
1970 Bangkok	Yoshiyuki Miyake (JPN)	Madek Kasman (INA)	Than Tun (BIR)
1974 Tehran	Kazumasa Hirai (JPN)	Song Sung-rim (PRK)	Khin Myint (BIR)
1978 Bangkok	Song Sung-rim (PRK)	Tan Hanyong (CHN)	Takashi Saito (JPN)
1982 New Delhi	Chen Weiqiang (CHN)	Ri Hi-bong (PRK)	Tan Hanyong (CHN)
1986 Seoul	Lai Runming (CHN)	Yosuke Muraki (JPN)	Lee Myung-su (KOR)
1990 Beijing	He Yingqiang (CHN)	Ri Jae-son (PRK)	Liao Hsing-chou (TPE)
1994 Hiroshima	Zhang Youyi (CHN)	Peng Song (CHN)	Liao Hsing-chou (TPE)
1998 Bangkok	Le Maosheng (CHN)	Dmitriy Lomakin (KAZ)	Hiroshi Ikehata (JPN)
2002 Busan	Le Maosheng (CHN)	Im Yong-su (PRK)	Cho Hyo-won (KOR)
2006 Doha	Qiu Le (CHN)	Mao Jiao (CHN)	Im Yong-su (PRK)
2010 Guangzhou	Zhang Jie (CHN)	Kim Un-guk (PRK)	Eko Yuli Irawan (INA)
2014 Incheon	Kim Un-guk (PRK)	Chen Lijun (CHN)	Eko Yuli Irawan (INA)
2018 Jakarta–Palembang	Eko Yuli Irawan (INA)	Trịnh Văn Vinh (VIE)	Adkhamjon Ergashev (UZB)
2022 Hangzhou	Chen Lijun (CHN)	Ri Won-ju (PRK)	Lee Sang-yeon (KOR)
2026 Aichi–Nagoya	Pak Myong-jin (PRK)	He Yueji (CHN)	Trần Minh Trí (VIE)

=== Lightweight ===
- 67.5 kg: 1951–1990
- 70 kg: 1994
- 69 kg: 1998–2018
- 73 kg: 2022
- 70 kg: 2026–

Games	Gold	Silver	Bronze
1951 New Delhi	Hassan Ferdos (IRN)	Peter Ho (SIN)	Minoru Kubota (JPN)
1954 Manila	Cho Bong-jik (KOR)	Minoru Kubota (JPN)	Thio Ging Hwie (INA)
1958 Tokyo	Tan Howe Liang (SIN)	Kenji Onuma (JPN)	Henrik Tamraz (IRN)
1966 Bangkok	Parviz Jalayer (IRN)	Takeo Kimura (JPN)	Won Shin-hee (KOR)
1970 Bangkok	Nasrollah Dehnavi (IRN)	Won Shin-hee (KOR)	Htein Win (BIR)
1974 Tehran	Won Shin-hee (KOR)	Nasrollah Dehnavi (IRN)	Takahiro Nakata (JPN)
1978 Bangkok	Kazumasa Hirai (JPN)	Zhao Xinmin (CHN)	Ri Gwang-ju (PRK)
1982 New Delhi	Yao Jingyuan (CHN)	Yatsuo Shimaya (JPN)	Zhao Xinmin (CHN)
1986 Seoul	Yao Jingyuan (CHN)	Lin Xiangkui (CHN)	Kim Ki-woong (KOR)
1990 Beijing	Kim Myong-nam (PRK)	Ri Hi-bong (PRK)	Hideo Mizuno (JPN)
1994 Hiroshima	Zhan Xugang (CHN)	Kim Hak-bong (KOR)	Vassiliy Pozyomin (KAZ)
1998 Bangkok	Kim Hak-bong (KOR)	Wan Jianhui (CHN)	Kim Myong-jung (PRK)
2002 Busan	Zhang Guozheng (CHN)	Erwin Abdullah (INA)	Mehdi Panzvan (IRI)
2006 Doha	Zhang Guozheng (CHN)	Shi Zhiyong (CHN)	Kim Sun-bae (KOR)
2010 Guangzhou	Kim Kum-sok (PRK)	Morteza Rezaeian (IRI)	Triyatno (INA)
2014 Incheon	Lin Qingfeng (CHN)	Kim Myong-hyok (PRK)	Karrar Mohammed (IRQ)
2018 Jakarta–Palembang	O Kang-chol (PRK)	Doston Yokubov (UZB)	Izzat Artykov (KGZ)
2022 Hangzhou	Rahmat Erwin Abdullah (INA)	Weeraphon Wichuma (THA)	Oh Kum-thaek (PRK)
2026 Aichi–Nagoya	Ri Won-ju (PRK)	Masanori Miyamoto (JPN)	Albert Delos Santos (PHI)

=== Middleweight ===
- 75 kg: 1951–1990
- 76 kg: 1994
- 77 kg: 1998–2018
- 81 kg: 2022
- 75 kg: 2026–

Games	Gold	Silver	Bronze
1951 New Delhi	Firouz Pojhan (IRN)	Jalal Mansouri (IRN)	Ba Thein (BIR)
1954 Manila	Kim Chang-hee (KOR)	La See-yun (KOR)	Hachiro Fujiwara (JPN)
1958 Tokyo	Ko Bu-beng (ROC)	Ebrahim Peiravi (IRN)	Yoshio Hara (JPN)
1966 Bangkok	Masushi Ouchi (JPN)	Lee Chun-sik (KOR)	Mohammad Ami-Tehrani (IRN)
1970 Bangkok	Nobuyuki Hatta (JPN)	Daniel Gevargiz (IRN)	Lee Chun-sik (KOR)
1974 Tehran	An Won-geun (PRK)	Etsuo Mitsuishi (JPN)	Mehdi Attar-Ashrafi (IRN)
1978 Bangkok	Mohamed Tarabulsi (LIB)	Tamotsu Sunami (JPN)	An Won-geun (PRK)
1982 New Delhi	Ali Pakizehjam (IRN)	Li Shunzhu (CHN)	Mohammed Yaseen (IRQ)
1986 Seoul	Cai Yanshu (CHN)	Liao Jiguang (CHN)	Yasushige Sasaki (JPN)
1990 Beijing	Jon Chol-ho (PRK)	Prasert Sumpradit (THA)	Yasushi Hiranaka (JPN)
1994 Hiroshima	Altymyrat Orazdurdyýew (TKM)	Hideo Mizuno (JPN)	Mital Sharipov (KGZ)
1998 Bangkok	Zhan Xugang (CHN)	Mohammad Hossein Barkhah (IRI)	Sergey Filimonov (KAZ)
2002 Busan	Sergey Filimonov (KAZ)	Mohammad Hossein Barkhah (IRI)	Mohammad Ali Falahatinejad (IRI)
2006 Doha	Li Hongli (CHN)	Lee Jeong-jae (KOR)	Harem Taha (IRQ)
2010 Guangzhou	Pang Kum-chol (PRK)	Kirill Pavlov (KAZ)	Dauren Shauyeteyev (KAZ)
2014 Incheon	Lü Xiaojun (CHN)	Kim Kwang-song (PRK)	Chatuphum Chinnawong (THA)
2018 Jakarta–Palembang	Choe Jon-wi (PRK)	Kim Woo-jae (KOR)	Chatuphum Chinnawong (THA)
2022 Hangzhou	Ri Chong-song (PRK)	Mukhammadkodir Toshtemirov (UZB)	Alexandr Uvarov (KAZ)
2026 Aichi–Nagoya	Rahmat Erwin Abdullah (INA)	Weeraphon Wichuma (THA)	Ri Chong-song (PRK)

=== Light heavyweight ===
- 82.5 kg: 1951–1990
- 83 kg: 1994
- 85 kg: 1998–

Games	Gold	Silver	Bronze
1951 New Delhi	Hassan Rahnavardi (IRN)	Cheong Kok Cheong (SIN)	Thein Han (BIR)
1954 Manila	Kim Sung-jip (KOR)	Muhammad Iqbal Butt (PAK)	Harold de Castro (SIN)
1958 Tokyo	Jalal Mansouri (IRN)	Minoru Kubota (JPN)	Park Dong-cheol (KOR)
1966 Bangkok	Lee Jong-sup (KOR)	Hideki Fujimoto (JPN)	Lee Yi-hsiung (ROC)
1970 Bangkok	Masushi Ouchi (JPN)	Chao Cheng-hsueng (ROC)	Park Moon-soo (KOR)
1974 Tehran	Sueo Fujishiro (JPN)	Ebrahim Pourdejam (IRN)	Badr Yaseen (IRQ)
1978 Bangkok	Kaoru Sato (JPN)	Ryu Dong-il (PRK)	Talal Hassoun (IRQ)
1982 New Delhi	Ryoji Isaoka (JPN)	Mohamed Tarabulsi (LIB)	Kim Hung-sam (PRK)
1986 Seoul	Ryoji Isaoka (JPN)	Saleh Mohammed (IRQ)	Khaled Moukaled (LIB)
1990 Beijing	Yeom Dong-chul (KOR)	Pak Ui-myong (PRK)	Ryoji Isaoka (JPN)
1994 Hiroshima	Vyacheslav Nyu (KAZ)	Li Yunnan (CHN)	Wang Yuanfeng (CHN)
1998 Bangkok	Shahin Nassirinia (IRI)	Yuan Aijun (CHN)	Bakhtiyor Nurullaev (UZB)
2002 Busan	Song Jong-shik (KOR)	Hadi Panzvan (IRI)	Bakhtiyor Nurullaev (UZB)
2006 Doha	Vyacheslav Yershov (KAZ)	Lu Yong (CHN)	Kim Seon-jong (KOR)
2010 Guangzhou	Lu Yong (CHN)	Mansurbek Chashemov (UZB)	Kim Kwang-hoon (KOR)
2014 Incheon	Tian Tao (CHN)	Kianoush Rostami (IRI)	Ulugbek Alimov (UZB)
2018 Jakarta–Palembang	Safaa Rashed (IRQ)	Jang Yeon-hak (KOR)	Jon Myong-song (PRK)
2026 Aichi–Nagoya	Ro Kwang-ryol (PRK)	Alexey Churkin (KAZ)	Chen Shunnan (CHN)

=== Middle heavyweight ===
- 90 kg: 1951–1990
- 91 kg: 1994
- 94 kg: 1998–2018
- 96 kg: 2022
- 95 kg: 2026–

Games	Gold	Silver	Bronze
1951 New Delhi	Rasoul Raeisi (IRN)	Kamineni Eswara Rao (IND)	Maung Maung Lwin (BIR)
1954 Manila	Ko Chong-ku (KOR)	Pedro del Mundo (PHI)	Joaquin Vasquez (PHI)
1958 Tokyo	Hassan Rahnavardi (IRN)	Hwang Ho-dong (KOR)	Tan Kim Bee (MAL)
1966 Bangkok	Lee Hyung-woo (KOR)	Masafumi Tsugioka (JPN)	Esmaeil Doroudian (IRN)
1970 Bangkok	Yun Sook-woon (KOR)	Hideki Fujimoto (JPN)	Ebrahim Pourdejam (IRN)
1974 Tehran	Ali Vali (IRN)	Qian Yukai (CHN)	Adi Brana (ISR)
1978 Bangkok	Ahn Ji-young (KOR)	Hafidh Shihab (IRQ)	Sann Myint (BIR)
1982 New Delhi	Ma Wenguang (CHN)	Mehran Eslampour (IRN)	Kim Chul-hyun (KOR)
1986 Seoul	Chun Byung-kook (KOR)	Atallah Mohammed (IRQ)	Darab Riahi (IRN)
1990 Beijing	Kim Byung-chan (KOR)	Lee Hyung-keun (KOR)	Rafey Saeed Butt (PAK)
1994 Hiroshima	Andrey Makarov (KAZ)	Anatoly Khrapaty (KAZ)	Chun Yong-sung (KOR)
1998 Bangkok	Andrey Makarov (KAZ)	Kourosh Bagheri (IRI)	Chun Yong-sung (KOR)
2002 Busan	Bakhyt Akhmetov (KAZ)	Kourosh Bagheri (IRI)	Lee Ung-jo (KOR)
2006 Doha	Ilya Ilyin (KAZ)	Lee Ung-jo (KOR)	Hsieh Wei-chun (TPE)
2010 Guangzhou	Ilya Ilyin (KAZ)	Asghar Ebrahimi (IRI)	Kim Min-jae (KOR)
2014 Incheon	Liu Hao (CHN)	Almas Uteshov (KAZ)	Lee Chang-ho (KOR)
2018 Jakarta–Palembang	Sohrab Moradi (IRI)	Fares El-Bakh (QAT)	Sarat Sumpradit (THA)
2022 Hangzhou	Tian Tao (CHN)	Ro Kwang-ryol (PRK)	Sarat Sumpradit (THA)
2026 Aichi–Nagoya	Ali Alipour (IRI)	Nurgissa Adiletuly (KAZ)	Tu Yi (CHN)

=== First heavyweight ===
- 100 kg: 1978–1990
- 99 kg: 1994

Games	Gold	Silver	Bronze
1978 Bangkok	Mitsumasa Sato (JPN)	Raef Ftouni (LIB)	Han Jin-suk (PRK)
1982 New Delhi	Ahn Ji-young (KOR)	Kensuke Matsuo (JPN)	Gian Singh Cheema (IND)
1986 Seoul	Hwang Woo-won (KOR)	Gu Yining (CHN)	Nobutaka Tomatsu (JPN)
1990 Beijing	Hwang Woo-won (KOR)	Yun Chol (PRK)	Kenji Tsurutani (JPN)
1994 Hiroshima	Sergey Kopytov (KAZ)	Choi Dong-kil (KOR)	Dmitriy Frolov (UZB)

=== Heavyweight ===
- +90 kg: 1951–1966
- 110 kg: 1970–1990
- 108 kg: 1994
- 105 kg: 1998–2018
- 109 kg: 2022
- 110 kg: 2026–

Games	Gold	Silver	Bronze
1951 New Delhi	Leon Kurukchian (IRN)	Ahmad Ordoubadi (IRN)	Dandamudi Rajagopal (IND)
1954 Manila	Maung Maung Lwin (BIR)	Hong Chi-hua (ROC)	Shih Ping-hua (ROC)
1958 Tokyo	Firouz Pojhan (IRN)	Lee Young-wan (KOR)	Gisaburo Seyama (JPN)
1966 Bangkok	Manouchehr Boroumand (IRN)	Hwang Ho-dong (KOR)	Reza Esteki (IRN)
1970 Bangkok	Kim Dae-jhu (KOR)	Abdul Rosjid (INA)	Houshang Kargarnejad (IRN)
1974 Tehran	Houshang Kargarnejad (IRN)	Yun Sook-woon (KOR)	Shlomo Ben-Lulu (ISR)
1978 Bangkok	Talal Najjar (SYR)	Song Zhenzhu (CHN)	Tsuneji Shibasaki (JPN)
1982 New Delhi	Ahn Hyo-jak (KOR)	Pak Bong-jun (PRK)	Tara Singh (IND)
1986 Seoul	Issam El-Homsi (LIB)	Kang Byung-shik (KOR)	Mahmoud Ghayeb (IRQ)
1990 Beijing	Kim Tae-hyun (KOR)	Chun Sang-suk (KOR)	Yang Dajun (CHN)
1994 Hiroshima	Cui Wenhua (CHN)	Chung Dae-jin (KOR)	Rafail Ziganchin (KAZ)
1998 Bangkok	Cui Wenhua (CHN)	Anatoly Khrapaty (KAZ)	Choi Jong-kun (KOR)
2002 Busan	Said Saif Asaad (QAT)	Cui Wenhua (CHN)	Hossein Tavakkoli (IRI)
2006 Doha	Ahed Joughili (SYR)	Mohammed Jasim (IRQ)	Bakhyt Akhmetov (KAZ)
2010 Guangzhou	Yang Zhe (CHN)	Ivan Efremov (UZB)	Sergey Istomin (KAZ)
2014 Incheon	Yang Zhe (CHN)	Kim Min-jae (KOR)	Sardorbek Dusmurotov (UZB)
2018 Jakarta–Palembang	Ruslan Nurudinov (UZB)	Salwan Jasim (IRQ)	Ali Hashemi (IRI)
2022 Hangzhou	Liu Huanhua (CHN)	Akbar Djuraev (UZB)	Ruslan Nurudinov (UZB)
2026 Aichi–Nagoya	Akbar Djuraev (UZB)	Şahzadbek Matýakubow (TKM)	Liu Huanhua (CHN)

=== Super heavyweight ===
- +110 kg: 1974–1990
- +108 kg: 1994
- +105 kg: 1998–2018
- +109 kg: 2022
- +110 kg: 2026–

Games	Gold	Silver	Bronze
1974 Tehran	Akbar Shokrollahi (IRN)	Hafez Hassani (IRN)	Suhail Khalil (IRQ)
1978 Bangkok	Yang Huaiqing (CHN)	Tariq Al-Adeeb (IRQ)	Mahmoud Mansour (IRQ)
1982 New Delhi	Talal Najjar (SYR)	Ali Vadi (IRN)	Meng Naidong (CHN)
1986 Seoul	Lee Min-woo (KOR)	Abdullah Issa (IRQ)	Mehdi Rezvani (IRN)
1990 Beijing	Cai Li (CHN)	Tao Wei (CHN)	Shon Sung-kook (KOR)
1994 Hiroshima	Kim Tae-hyun (KOR)	Wei Tiehan (CHN)	Igor Khalilov (UZB)
1998 Bangkok	Kim Tae-hyun (KOR)	Igor Khalilov (UZB)	Hossein Rezazadeh (IRI)
2002 Busan	Hossein Rezazadeh (IRI)	Igor Khalilov (UZB)	Munehiro Morita (JPN)
2006 Doha	Hossein Rezazadeh (IRI)	Jaber Saeed Salem (QAT)	Andrey Martemyanov (UZB)
2010 Guangzhou	Behdad Salimi (IRI)	Jeon Sang-guen (KOR)	Sajjad Anoushiravani (IRI)
2014 Incheon	Behdad Salimi (IRI)	Ai Yunan (CHN)	Chen Shih-chieh (TPE)
2018 Jakarta–Palembang	Behdad Salimi (IRI)	Saeid Alihosseini (IRI)	Rustam Djangabaev (UZB)
2022 Hangzhou	Gor Minasyan (BRN)	Ali Davoudi (IRI)	Rustam Djangabaev (UZB)
2026 Aichi–Nagoya	Ali Davoudi (IRI)	Ali Ammar (IRQ)	Gor Minasyan (BRN)

== Women ==
=== Flyweight ===
- 44 kg: 1990
- 46 kg: 1994

Games	Gold	Silver	Bronze
1990 Beijing	Xing Fen (CHN)	Satomi Saito (JPN)	Kunjarani Devi (IND)
1994 Hiroshima	Guan Hong (CHN)	Misasanga Wangkiree (THA)	Kunjarani Devi (IND)

=== Bantamweight ===
- 48 kg: 1990
- 50 kg: 1994
- 48 kg: 1998–2018
- 49 kg: 2022–

Games	Gold	Silver	Bronze
1990 Beijing	Huang Xiaoyu (CHN)	Ratcharnee Boonmaread (THA)	Ponco Imbarwati (INA)
1994 Hiroshima	Liu Xiuhua (CHN)	Supeni Wasiman (INA)	Choi Myung-shik (KOR)
1998 Bangkok	Liu Xiuhua (CHN)	Kay Thi Win (MYA)	Sri Indriyani (INA)
2002 Busan	Li Zhuo (CHN)	Kay Thi Win (MYA)	Raema Lisa Rumbewas (INA)
2006 Doha	Wang Mingjuan (CHN)	Pensiri Laosirikul (THA)	Thongyim Bunphithak (THA)
2010 Guangzhou	Wang Mingjuan (CHN)	Pensiri Laosirikul (THA)	Chen Wei-ling (TPE)
2014 Incheon	Margarita Yelisseyeva (KAZ)	Sri Wahyuni Agustiani (INA)	Mahliyo Togoeva (UZB)
2018 Jakarta–Palembang	Ri Song-gum (PRK)	Sri Wahyuni Agustiani (INA)	Thunya Sukcharoen (THA)
2022 Hangzhou	Ri Song-gum (PRK)	Jiang Huihua (CHN)	Thanyathon Sukcharoen (THA)
2026 Aichi–Nagoya	Ri Song-gum (PRK)	Mirabai Chanu (IND)	Luluk Diana Tri Wijayana (INA)

=== Featherweight ===
- 52 kg: 1990
- 54 kg: 1994
- 53 kg: 1998–2018
- 55 kg: 2022
- 53 kg: 2026–

Games	Gold	Silver	Bronze
1990 Beijing	Peng Liping (CHN)	Kim Yong-sun (PRK)	Chhaya Adak (IND)
1994 Hiroshima	Zhang Juhua (CHN)	Karnam Malleswari (IND)	Patmawati Abdul Hamid (INA)
1998 Bangkok	Yang Xia (CHN)	Li Feng-ying (TPE)	Swe Swe Win (MYA)
2002 Busan	Ri Song-hui (PRK)	Udomporn Polsak (THA)	Meng Xianjuan (CHN)
2006 Doha	Li Ping (CHN)	Junpim Kuntatean (THA)	Yu Weili (HKG)
2010 Guangzhou	Li Ping (CHN)	Zulfiya Chinshanlo (KAZ)	Prapawadee Jaroenrattanatarakoon (THA)
2014 Incheon	Hsu Shu-ching (TPE)	Zulfiya Chinshanlo (KAZ)	Zhang Wanqiong (CHN)
2018 Jakarta–Palembang	Hidilyn Diaz (PHI)	Kristina Şermetowa (TKM)	Surodchana Khambao (THA)
2022 Hangzhou	Kang Hyon-gyong (PRK)	Ri Su-yon (PRK)	Hou Zhihui (CHN)
2026 Aichi–Nagoya	Kang Hyon-gyong (PRK)	Zhao Jinlan (CHN)	Surodchana Khambao (THA)

=== Lightweight ===
- 56 kg: 1990
- 59 kg: 1994
- 58 kg: 1998–2018
- 59 kg: 2022
- 57 kg: 2026–

Games	Gold	Silver	Bronze
1990 Beijing	Xing Liwei (CHN)	Ni Chia-ping (TPE)	Mami Abe (JPN)
1994 Hiroshima	Chen Xiaomin (CHN)	Khassaraporn Suta (THA)	Neelam Setti Laxmi (IND)
1998 Bangkok	Chen Yanqing (CHN)	Ri Song-hui (PRK)	Khassaraporn Suta (THA)
2002 Busan	Zhou Yan (CHN)	Wandee Kameaim (THA)	Tanti Pratiwi (INA)
2006 Doha	Chen Yanqing (CHN)	Wandee Kameaim (THA)	Pak Hyon-suk (PRK)
2010 Guangzhou	Li Xueying (CHN)	Pak Hyon-suk (PRK)	Jong Chun-mi (PRK)
2014 Incheon	Ri Jong-hwa (PRK)	Wang Shuai (CHN)	Rattikan Gulnoi (THA)
2018 Jakarta–Palembang	Kuo Hsing-chun (TPE)	Sukanya Srisurat (THA)	Mikiko Ando (JPN)
2022 Hangzhou	Kim Il-gyong (PRK)	Luo Shifang (CHN)	Kuo Hsing-chun (TPE)
2026 Aichi–Nagoya	Oh Kwang-ok (PRK)	Suratwadee Yodsarn (THA)	Chen Guan-ling (TPE)

=== Middleweight ===
- 60 kg: 1990
- 64 kg: 1994
- 63 kg: 1998–2018
- 64 kg: 2022
- 61 kg: 2026–

Games	Gold	Silver	Bronze
1990 Beijing	Ma Na (CHN)	Patmawati Abdul Hamid (INA)	Won Soon-yi (KOR)
1994 Hiroshima	Lei Li (CHN)	Kuo Shu-fen (TPE)	Yuriko Takahashi (JPN)
1998 Bangkok	Lei Li (CHN)	Karnam Malleswari (IND)	Chen Jui-lien (TPE)
2002 Busan	Liu Xia (CHN)	Khin Moe Nwe (MYA)	Kuo Ping-chun (TPE)
2006 Doha	Pawina Thongsuk (THA)	Ouyang Xiaofang (CHN)	Thaw Yae Faw (MYA)
2010 Guangzhou	Maiya Maneza (KAZ)	Kim Soo-kyung (KOR)	Chen Aichan (CHN)
2014 Incheon	Lin Tzu-chi (TPE)	Deng Wei (CHN)	Jo Pok-hyang (PRK)
2018 Jakarta–Palembang	Kim Hyo-sim (PRK)	Choe Hyo-sim (PRK)	Rattanawan Wamalun (THA)
2022 Hangzhou	Rim Un-sim (PRK)	Pei Xinyi (CHN)	Elreen Ando (PHI)
2026 Aichi–Nagoya	Yang Liuyue (CHN)	Pak Jin-hae (PRK)	Kuo Hsing-chun (TPE)

=== Light heavyweight ===
- 67.5 kg: 1990
- 70 kg: 1994
- 69 kg: 1998–

Games	Gold	Silver	Bronze
1990 Beijing	Guo Qiuxiang (CHN)	Kumi Haseba (JPN)	Chung Myung-sook (KOR)
1994 Hiroshima	Tang Weifang (CHN)	Wasana Putcharkarn (THA)	Win Win Maw (MYA)
1998 Bangkok	Sun Tianni (CHN)	Win Win Maw (MYA)	Wu Mei-yi (TPE)
2002 Busan	Liu Chunhong (CHN)	Pawina Thongsuk (THA)	Mya Sanda Oo (MYA)
2006 Doha	Liu Haixia (CHN)	Yar Thet Pan (MYA)	Kim Mi-kyung (KOR)
2010 Guangzhou	Liu Chunhong (CHN)	Sinta Darmariani (INA)	Wang Ya-jhen (TPE)
2014 Incheon	Xiang Yanmei (CHN)	Ryo Un-hui (PRK)	Huang Shih-hsu (TPE)
2018 Jakarta–Palembang	Rim Un-sim (PRK)	Hung Wan-ting (TPE)	Mun Yu-ra (KOR)
2026 Aichi–Nagoya	Song Kuk-hyang (PRK)	Chen Wen-huei (TPE)	Ingrid Segura (BRN)

=== Middle heavyweight ===
- 75 kg: 1990
- 76 kg: 1994
- 75 kg: 1998–2018
- 76 kg: 2022
- 77 kg: 2026–

Games	Gold	Silver	Bronze
1990 Beijing	Shi Wen (CHN)	Chen Shu-chih (TPE)	Kim Gyong-ae (PRK)
1994 Hiroshima	Hua Ju (CHN)	Kumi Haseba (JPN)	Lin Ya-ching (TPE)
1998 Bangkok	Wei Xiangying (CHN)	Kim Soon-hee (KOR)	Aye Mon Khin (MYA)
2002 Busan	Sun Ruiping (CHN)	Tatyana Khromova (KAZ)	Kim Soon-hee (KOR)
2006 Doha	Cao Lei (CHN)	Kim Soon-hee (KOR)	Sinta Darmariani (INA)
2010 Guangzhou	Svetlana Podobedova (KAZ)	Cao Lei (CHN)	Tatyana Khromova (KAZ)
2014 Incheon	Kim Un-ju (PRK)	Kang Yue (CHN)	Rim Jong-sim (PRK)
2018 Jakarta–Palembang	Rim Jong-sim (PRK)	Omadoy Otakuziyeva (UZB)	Mun Min-hee (KOR)
2022 Hangzhou	Song Kuk-hyang (PRK)	Jong Chun-hui (PRK)	Kim Su-hyeon (KOR)
2026 Aichi–Nagoya	He Renxiu (CHN)	Ayanat Zhumagali (KAZ)	Reihaneh Karimi (IRI)

=== Heavyweight ===
- 82.5 kg: 1990
- 83 kg: 1994
- 87 kg: 2022
- 86 kg: 2026–

Games	Gold	Silver	Bronze
1990 Beijing	Li Hongling (CHN)	Bharti Singh (IND)	Sin Gum-son (PRK)
1994 Hiroshima	Zhang Xiaoli (CHN)	Chen Shu-chih (TPE)	Kamala Chaiporn (THA)
2022 Hangzhou	Liang Xiaomei (CHN)	Yun Ha-je (KOR)	Jung A-ram (KOR)
2026 Aichi–Nagoya	Wu Yan (CHN)	Alina Marushchak (BRN)	Mahsa Beheshti (IRI)

=== Super heavyweight ===
- +82.5 kg: 1990
- +83 kg: 1994
- +75 kg: 1998–2018
- +87 kg: 2022
- +86 kg: 2026–

Games	Gold	Silver	Bronze
1990 Beijing	Han Changmei (CHN)	Jyotsna Dutta (IND)	Mao Yin-hua (TPE)
1994 Hiroshima	Li Yajuan (CHN)	Chen Hsiao-lien (TPE)	Bharti Singh (IND)
1998 Bangkok	Ding Meiyuan (CHN)	Aye Aye Aung (MYA)	Chen Hsiao-lien (TPE)
2002 Busan	Tang Gonghong (CHN)	Jang Mi-ran (KOR)	Moon Kyung-ae (KOR)
2006 Doha	Mu Shuangshuang (CHN)	Jang Mi-ran (KOR)	Annipa Moontar (THA)
2010 Guangzhou	Jang Mi-ran (KOR)	Meng Suping (CHN)	Mariya Grabovetskaya (KAZ)
2014 Incheon	Zhou Lulu (CHN)	Mariya Grabovetskaya (KAZ)	Chitchanok Pulsabsakul (THA)
2018 Jakarta–Palembang	Kim Kuk-hyang (PRK)	Son Young-hee (KOR)	Duangaksorn Chaidee (THA)
2022 Hangzhou	Park Hye-jeong (KOR)	Son Young-hee (KOR)	Duangaksorn Chaidee (THA)
2026 Aichi–Nagoya	Li Wenwen (CHN)	Park Hye-jeong (KOR)	Ouisal Ikhlef (QAT)

== Men's snatch ==
=== Flyweight ===
- 52 kg: 1974

Games	Gold	Silver	Bronze
1974 Tehran	Aung Gyi (BIR)	Mohammad Nassiri (IRN)	Masatomo Takeuchi (JPN)

=== Bantamweight ===
- 56 kg: 1974

Games	Gold	Silver	Bronze
1974 Tehran	Kenkichi Ando (JPN)	Tin Sein (BIR)	Chen Manlin (CHN)

=== Featherweight ===
- 60 kg: 1974

Games	Gold	Silver	Bronze
1974 Tehran	Kazumasa Hirai (JPN)	Song Sung-rim (PRK)	Khin Myint (BIR)

=== Lightweight ===
- 67.5 kg: 1974

Games	Gold	Silver	Bronze
1974 Tehran	Won Shin-hee (KOR)	Nasrollah Dehnavi (IRN)	Takahiro Nakata (JPN)

=== Middleweight ===
- 75 kg: 1974

Games	Gold	Silver	Bronze
1974 Tehran	Etsuo Mitsuishi (JPN)	An Won-geun (PRK)	Mehdi Attar-Ashrafi (IRN)

=== Light heavyweight ===
- 82.5 kg: 1974

Games	Gold	Silver	Bronze
1974 Tehran	Sueo Fujishiro (JPN)	Ebrahim Pourdejam (IRN)	Lee Chun-sik (KOR)

=== Middle heavyweight ===
- 90 kg: 1974

Games	Gold	Silver	Bronze
1974 Tehran	Qian Yukai (CHN)	Ali Vali (IRN)	Adi Brana (ISR)

=== Heavyweight ===
- 110 kg: 1974

Games	Gold	Silver	Bronze
1974 Tehran	Houshang Kargarnejad (IRN)	Shlomo Ben-Lulu (ISR)	Yun Sook-woon (KOR)

=== Super heavyweight ===
- +110 kg: 1974

Games	Gold	Silver	Bronze
1974 Tehran	Akbar Shokrollahi (IRN)	Hwang Ho-dong (KOR)	Hafez Hassani (IRN)

== Men's clean & jerk ==
=== Flyweight ===
- 52 kg: 1974

Games	Gold	Silver	Bronze
1974 Tehran	Mohammad Nassiri (IRN)	Pak Dong-geun (PRK)	Masatomo Takeuchi (JPN)

=== Bantamweight ===
- 56 kg: 1974

Games	Gold	Silver	Bronze
1974 Tehran	Kenkichi Ando (JPN)	Chen Manlin (CHN)	Han Gyong-si (PRK)

=== Featherweight ===
- 60 kg: 1974

Games	Gold	Silver	Bronze
1974 Tehran	Kazumasa Hirai (JPN)	Om Jong-guk (PRK)	Song Sung-rim (PRK)

=== Lightweight ===
- 67.5 kg: 1974

Games	Gold	Silver	Bronze
1974 Tehran	Won Shin-hee (KOR)	Nasrollah Dehnavi (IRN)	Moon Sok-joon (PRK)

=== Middleweight ===
- 75 kg: 1974

Games	Gold	Silver	Bronze
1974 Tehran	An Won-geun (PRK)	Mehdi Attar-Ashrafi (IRN)	Muhammad Arshad Malik (PAK)

=== Light heavyweight ===
- 82.5 kg: 1974

Games	Gold	Silver	Bronze
1974 Tehran	Sueo Fujishiro (JPN)	Ebrahim Pourdejam (IRN)	Badr Yaseen (IRQ)

=== Middle heavyweight ===
- 90 kg: 1974

Games	Gold	Silver	Bronze
1974 Tehran	Ali Vali (IRN)	Qian Yukai (CHN)	Adi Brana (ISR)

=== Heavyweight ===
- 110 kg: 1974

Games	Gold	Silver	Bronze
1974 Tehran	Houshang Kargarnejad (IRN)	Yun Sook-woon (KOR)	Yoji Iwasaki (JPN)

=== Super heavyweight ===
- +110 kg: 1974

Games	Gold	Silver	Bronze
1974 Tehran	Hafez Hassani (IRN)	Akbar Shokrollahi (IRN)	Suhail Khalil (IRQ)
