= Weightlifting at the 1986 Asian Games =

Weightlifting in Seoul

- Venue: Olympic Weightlifting Gymnasium
- Dates: 21 September – 1 October 1986
- Competitors: 75 from 13 nations

Weightlifting was contested from 21 September to 1 October 1986, at the 1986 Asian Games in Olympic Weightlifting Gymnasium, Seoul, South Korea. The competition included only men's events for ten different weight categories.

China topped the medal table with five gold medals, South Korea won three gold medals while Japan and Lebanon each won one gold medal.

== Medalists ==
Event	Gold	Silver	Bronze
52 kg	He Zhuoqiang; China	Kazushito Manabe; Japan	Gurunathan Muthuswamy; India
56 kg	He Yingqiang; China	Zeng Guoqiang; China	Dirdja Wihardja; Indonesia
60 kg	Lai Runming; China	Yosuke Muraki; Japan	Lee Myung-su; South Korea
67.5 kg	Yao Jingyuan; China	Lin Xiangkui; China	Kim Ki-woong; South Korea
75 kg	Cai Yanshu; China	Liao Jiguang; China	Yasushige Sasaki; Japan
82.5 kg	Ryoji Isaoka; Japan	Saleh Mohammed; Iraq	Khaled Moukaled; Lebanon
90 kg	Chun Byung-kook; South Korea	Atallah Mohammed; Iraq	Darab Riahi; Iran
100 kg	Hwang Woo-won; South Korea	Gu Yining; China	Nobutaka Tomatsu; Japan
110 kg	Issam El-Homsi; Lebanon	Kang Byung-shik; South Korea	Mahmoud Ghayeb; Iraq
+110 kg	Lee Min-woo; South Korea	Abdullah Issa; Iraq	Mehdi Rezvani; Iran

== Medal table ==
Rank	Nation	Gold	Silver	Bronze	Total
1	China (CHN)	5	4	0	9
2	South Korea (KOR)	3	1	2	6
3	Japan (JPN)	1	2	2	5
4	Lebanon (LIB)	1	0	1	2
5	Iraq (IRQ)	0	3	1	4
6	Iran (IRN)	0	0	2	2
7	India (IND)	0	0	1	1
7	Indonesia (INA)	0	0	1	1
Totals (8 entries)		10	10	10	30

== Participating nations ==
A total of 75 athletes from 13 nations competed in weightlifting at the 1986 Asian Games:

- China (10)
- India (6)
- Indonesia (4)
- Iran (10)
- Iraq (9)
- Japan (10)
- Lebanon (2)
- Nepal (6)
- Pakistan (2)
- Philippines (3)
- Saudi Arabia (1)
- South Korea (10)
- Thailand (2)
