= Weightlifting at the 1990 Asian Games =

- Venue: Ditan Gymnasium
- Dates: 23 September – 1 October 1990

Weightlifting was contested from September 23 to October 1, 1990, at the 1990 Asian Games in Ditan Gymnasium, Beijing, China.

== Medalists ==
=== Men ===
Event	Gold	Silver	Bronze
52 kg	He Zhuoqiang; China	Zhang Shoulie; China	Kim Myong-sik; North Korea
56 kg	Chun Byung-kwan; South Korea	Liu Shoubin; China	Luo Jianming; China
60 kg	He Yingqiang; China	Ri Jae-son; North Korea	Liao Hsing-chou; Chinese Taipei
67.5 kg	Kim Myong-nam; North Korea	Ri Hi-bong; North Korea	Hideo Mizuno; Japan
75 kg	Jon Chol-ho; North Korea	Prasert Sumpradit; Thailand	Yasushi Hiranaka; Japan
82.5 kg	Yeom Dong-chul; South Korea	Pak Ui-myong; North Korea	Ryoji Isaoka; Japan
90 kg	Kim Byung-chan; South Korea	Lee Hyung-keun; South Korea	Rafey Saeed Butt; Pakistan
100 kg	Hwang Woo-won; South Korea	Yun Chol; North Korea	Kenji Tsurutani; Japan
110 kg	Kim Tae-hyun; South Korea	Chun Sang-suk; South Korea	Yang Dajun; China
+110 kg	Cai Li; China	Tao Wei; China	Shon Sung-kook; South Korea

=== Women ===
Event	Gold	Silver	Bronze
44 kg	Xing Fen; China	Satomi Saito; Japan	Kunjarani Devi; India
48 kg	Huang Xiaoyu; China	Ratcharnee Boonmaread; Thailand	Ponco Imbarwati; Indonesia
52 kg	Peng Liping; China	Kim Yong-sun; North Korea	Chhaya Adak; India
56 kg	Xing Liwei; China	Ni Chia-ping; Chinese Taipei	Mami Abe; Japan
60 kg	Ma Na; China	Patmawati Abdul Hamid; Indonesia	Won Soon-yi; South Korea
67.5 kg	Guo Qiuxiang; China	Kumi Haseba; Japan	Chung Myung-sook; South Korea
75 kg	Shi Wen; China	Chen Shu-chih; Chinese Taipei	Kim Gyong-ae; North Korea
82.5 kg	Li Hongling; China	Bharti Singh; India	Sin Gum-son; North Korea
+82.5 kg	Han Changmei; China	Jyotsna Dutta; India	Mao Yin-hua; Chinese Taipei

== Medal table ==
Rank	Nation	Gold	Silver	Bronze	Total
1	China (CHN)	12	3	2	17
2	South Korea (KOR)	5	2	3	10
3	North Korea (PRK)	2	5	3	10
4	Japan (JPN)	0	2	5	7
5	Chinese Taipei (TPE)	0	2	2	4
5	India (IND)	0	2	2	4
7	Thailand (THA)	0	2	0	2
8	Indonesia (INA)	0	1	1	2
9	Pakistan (PAK)	0	0	1	1
Totals (9 entries)		19	19	19	57
