= Weightlifting at the Asian Games =

- Governing bodies: IWF (World) / AWF (Asia)
- Events: 16 (men: 8; women: 8)

Games
- 1951; 1954; 1958; 1962; 1966; 1970; 1974; 1978; 1982; 1986; 1990; 1994; 1998; 2002; 2006; 2010; 2014; 2018; 2022; 2026
- Medalists; Records

Weightlifting has been an event at the Asian Games since 1951 in New Delhi.

== Editions ==
| Games | Year | Host city | Best nation |
|---|---|---|---|
| I | 1951 | New Delhi, India | Iran |
| II | 1954 | Manila, Philippines | South Korea |
| III | 1958 | Tokyo, Japan | Iran |
| V | 1966 | Bangkok, Thailand | Iran |
| VI | 1970 | Bangkok, Thailand | Japan |
| VII | 1974 | Tehran, Iran | Iran |
| VIII | 1978 | Bangkok, Thailand | North Korea |
| IX | 1982 | New Delhi, India | China |
| X | 1986 | Seoul, South Korea | China |
| XI | 1990 | Beijing, China | China |
| XII | 1994 | Hiroshima, Japan | China |
| XIII | 1998 | Bangkok, Thailand | China |
| XIV | 2002 | Busan, South Korea | China |
| XV | 2006 | Doha, Qatar | China |
| XVI | 2010 | Guangzhou, China | China |
| XVII | 2014 | Incheon, South Korea | China |
| XVIII | 2018 | Jakarta–Palembang, Indonesia | North Korea |
| XIX | 2022 | Hangzhou, China | North Korea |
| XX | 2026 | Aichi–Nagoya, Japan | North Korea |

== Events ==
=== Men's events ===
1951–1954

- Bantamweight -56 kg
- Featherweight 56–60 kg
- Lightweight 60–67.5 kg
- Middleweight 67.5–75 kg
- Light-heavyweight 75–82.5 kg
- Middle-heavyweight 82.5–90 kg
- Heavyweight +90 kg

1958–1970 (except 1962)

- Flyweight -52 kg
- Bantamweight 52–56 kg
- Featherweight 56–60 kg
- Lightweight 60–67.5 kg
- Middleweight 67.5–75 kg
- Light-heavyweight 75–82.5 kg
- Middle-heavyweight 82.5–90 kg
- Heavyweight +90 kg

1974

- Flyweight -52 kg
- Bantamweight 52–56 kg
- Featherweight 56–60 kg
- Lightweight 60–67.5 kg
- Middleweight 67.5–75 kg
- Light-heavyweight 75–82.5 kg
- Middle-heavyweight 82.5–90 kg
- Heavyweight 90–110 kg
- Super heavyweight +110 kg

1978-1990

- Flyweight -52 kg
- Bantamweight 52–56 kg
- Featherweight 56–60 kg
- Lightweight 60–67.5 kg
- Middleweight 67.5–75 kg
- Light-heavyweight 75–82.5 kg
- Middle-heavyweight 82.5–90 kg
- First-heavyweight 90–100 kg
- Heavyweight 100–110 kg
- Super heavyweight +110 kg

1994

- Flyweight -54 kg
- Bantamweight 54–59 kg
- Featherweight 59–64 kg
- Lightweight 64–70 kg
- Middleweight 70–76 kg
- Light-heavyweight 76–83 kg
- Middle-heavyweight 83–91 kg
- First-heavyweight 91–99 kg
- Heavyweight 99–108 kg
- Super heavyweight +108 kg

1998–2018

- Bantamweight -56 kg
- Featherweight 56–62 kg
- Lightweight 62–69 kg
- Middleweight 69–77 kg
- Light-heavyweight 77–85 kg
- Middle-heavyweight 85–94 kg
- Heavyweight 94–105 kg
- Super heavyweight +105 kg

2022–present

- Bantamweight -61 kg
- Featherweight 61–67 kg
- Lightweight 67–73 kg
- Middleweight 73–81 kg
- Middle-heavyweight 81–96 kg
- Heavyweight 96–109 kg
- Super heavyweight +109 kg

=== Women's events ===
1990

- 44 kg
- 48 kg
- 52 kg
- 56 kg
- 60 kg
- 67.5 kg
- 75 kg
- 82.5 kg
- +82.5 kg

1994

- 46 kg
- 50 kg
- 54 kg
- 59 kg
- 64 kg
- 70 kg
- 76 kg
- 83 kg
- +83 kg

1998–2018

- 48 kg
- 53 kg
- 58 kg
- 63 kg
- 69 kg
- 75 kg
- +75 kg

2022–present

- 49 kg
- 55 kg
- 59 kg
- 64 kg
- 76 kg
- 87 kg
- +87 kg

== Medal table ==
| Rank | Nation | Gold | Silver | Bronze | Total |
|---|---|---|---|---|---|
| 1 | China (CHN) | 91 | 40 | 16 | 147 |
| 2 | Iran (IRI) | 35 | 31 | 22 | 88 |
| 2 | North Korea (PRK) | 35 | 31 | 22 | 88 |
| 4 | South Korea (KOR) | 32 | 32 | 34 | 98 |
| 5 | Japan (JPN) | 23 | 20 | 29 | 72 |
| 6 | Kazakhstan (KAZ) | 12 | 12 | 9 | 33 |
| 7 | Chinese Taipei (TPE) | 4 | 12 | 20 | 36 |
| 8 | Indonesia (INA) | 3 | 8 | 15 | 26 |
| 9 | Myanmar (MYA) | 3 | 8 | 13 | 24 |
| 10 | Syria (SYR) | 3 | 0 | 0 | 3 |
| 11 | Thailand (THA) | 2 | 16 | 19 | 37 |
| 12 | Uzbekistan (UZB) | 2 | 8 | 12 | 22 |
| 13 | Lebanon (LBN) | 2 | 2 | 1 | 5 |
| 14 | Iraq (IRQ) | 1 | 8 | 10 | 19 |
| 15 | Philippines (PHI) | 1 | 5 | 5 | 11 |
| 16 | Singapore (SGP) | 1 | 3 | 2 | 6 |
| 17 | Qatar (QAT) | 1 | 2 | 1 | 4 |
| 18 | Turkmenistan (TKM) | 1 | 2 | 0 | 3 |
| 19 | Bahrain (BRN) | 1 | 1 | 2 | 4 |
| 20 | India (IND) | 0 | 6 | 9 | 15 |
| 21 | Vietnam (VIE) | 0 | 4 | 1 | 5 |
| 22 | Israel (ISR) | 0 | 1 | 4 | 5 |
| 23 | Pakistan (PAK) | 0 | 1 | 3 | 4 |
| 24 | Kyrgyzstan (KGZ) | 0 | 0 | 2 | 2 |
| 25 | Hong Kong (HKG) | 0 | 0 | 1 | 1 |
| 25 | Malaysia (MAS) | 0 | 0 | 1 | 1 |
| Totals (26 entries) | | 253 | 253 | 253 | 759 |

== Multiple medalists ==
The table shows those who have won at least 2 gold medals and 3 medals in total.

| Rank | Weightlifter | Country | Gender | Weights | From | To | Gold | Silver | Bronze | Total |
|---|---|---|---|---|---|---|---|---|---|---|
| 1 | Mohammad Nassiri | Iran | M | 52–56 kg | 1966 | 1974 | 3 | - | - | 3 |
| 1 | Kim Tae-hyun | South Korea | M | 110 kg / +105–108 kg | 1990 | 1998 | 3 | - | - | 3 |
| 1 | Behdad Salimi | Iran | M | +105 kg | 2010 | 2018 | 3 | - | - | 3 |
| 1 | Ri Song-gum | North Korea | F | 48–49kg | 2018 | 2026 | 3 | - | - | 3 |
| 5 | Ryoji Isaoka | Japan | M | 82.5 kg | 1982 | 1990 | 2 | - | 1 | 3 |
| 5 | Hossein Rezazadeh | Iran | M | +105 kg | 1998 | 2006 | 2 | - | 1 | 3 |

== See also ==
- Asian Weightlifting Championships
