= Islamic Republic of Iran Weightlifting Federation =

Sports governing body in Iran

Iran Weightlifting Federation
- Abbreviation: IRIWF
- Formation: 1939
- Type: Sports federation
- Headquarters: Azadi Sport Complex, Tehran, Iran
- Coordinates: 35°41′46.00″N 51°25′23.00″E
- President: Sajjad Anoushiravani
- Affiliations: Asian Weightlifting Federation (AWF)
- Website: www.iriwf.ir/fa-ir

Iran Weightlifting Federation (Persian: فدراسیون وزنه برداری جمهوری اسلامی ایران, IRIWF) is the governing body for weightlifting in Iran.

== History ==
IRIWF has been established in 1939. IRIWF is a member of the International Weightlifting Federation (IWF) and also Asian Weightlifting Federation (AWF). The federation organizes the national weightlifting events, and Asian and World championships hosted by Iran.

== The Committees ==
There are many committees in I.R.I.W.F. structure such as:

- Referees Committee
- Coaches Committee
- Talent Committee
- Education Committee
- Disciplinary Committee

== International achievements ==
=== Olympics ===
Year	Host city	Host Country	Rank	Gold	Silver	Bronze	Total
1948	London	United Kingdom	5	0	0	1	1
1952	Helsinki	Finland	3	0	1	1	2
1956	Melbourne	Australia	5	0	0	1	1
1960	Rome	Italy	6	0	0	1	1
1968	Mexico City	Mexico	3	1	1	0	2
1972	Munich	West Germany	6	0	1	0	1
1976	Montreal	Canada	9	0	0	1	1
2000	Sydney	Australia	3	2	0	0	2
2004	Athens	Greece	7	1	0	0	1
2012	London	United Kingdom	4	2	3	0	5
2016	Rio de Janeiro	Brazil	3	2	0	0	2
-	Host City	Host Country	Total	8	6	5	19

=== World Championships ===
Year	Host Country	Rank	Gold	Silver	Bronze	Total
1949	Netherlands	3	1	0	2	3
1950	France	3	1	0	0	1
1951	Italy	3	1	1	3	5
1954	Austria	3	0	1	1	2
1955	West Germany	4	0	0	2	2
1957	Iran	3	0	2	3	5
1958	Sweden	4	0	0	3	3
1962	Hungary	7	0	0	1	1
1966	East Germany	6	0	0	2	2
1968	Mexico	3	1	1	0	2
1969	Poland	6	1	0	0	1
1970	United States	4	1	0	0	1
1971	Peru	10	0	0	1	1
1972	West Germany	6	0	1	0	1
1973	Cuba	3	1	0	0	1
1974	Philippines	3	1	0	1	2
1976	Canada	9	0	0	1	1
1999	Greece	7	1	0	1	2
2001	Turkey	9	1	0	1	2
2002	Poland	6	1	0	1	2
2003	Canada	2	2	0	0	2
2005	Qatar	5	1	0	0	1
2006	Dominican Republic	4	1	0	0	1
2010	Turkey	8	1	0	0	1
2011	France	4	2	1	1	4
2013	Poland	8	0	1	0	1
2014	Kazakhstan	5	1	1	0	2
2015	United States	11	0	1	0	1
2017	United States	1	2	2	1	5
2018	Turkmenistan	2	2	0	1	3
2019	Thailand	10	0	1	1	2
-	Host Country	Total	23	13	27	63

=== Asian Games ===
Year	Host city	Host Country	Rank	Gold	Silver	Bronze	Total
1951	New Delhi	India	1	7	3	0	10
1958	Tokyo	Japan	1	3	4	1	8
1966	Bangkok	Thailand	1	3	0	4	7
1970	Bangkok	Thailand	2	2	1	3	6
1974	Tehran	Iran	1	10	11	3	24
1982	New Delhi	India	4	1	2	0	3
1986	Seoul	South Korea	6	0	0	2	2
1998	Bangkok	Thailand	3	1	2	2	5
2002	Busan	South Korea	3	1	3	3	7
2006	Doha	Qatar	4	1	0	0	1
2010	Guangzhou	China	5	1	2	1	4
2014	Incheon	South Korea	5	1	1	0	2
2018	Jakarta	Indonesia	2	2	1	1	4
-	Host City	Host Country	Total	31	29	19	79

== Notable weightlifters ==
Men

- Hossein Rezazadeh, twice Olympic four-times World and twice Asian Games Champion.
- Mohammad Nasiri, triple Olympic Medalist (1 Gold. 1 Silver and 1 Bronze) five-times World and three-times Asian Games Champion.
- Behdad Salimi, Olympic Champion, two-times World Champion and also triple Asian Games Champion.
- Kianoush Rostami, Olympic Champion and Olympic silver Medalist and also two-times World Champion.
- Hossein Tavakoli, Olympic Champion.
- Sohrab Moradi, Olympic Champion. World Champion and Asian Games Champion.
- Mahmoud Namjoo, twice Olympic Medalist ( 1 Silver, 1 Bronze ), tree-times World Champion and Also Asian Games Champion.
- Parviz Jalayer, Olympic Silver Medalist and Asian Games Champion.
- Shahin Nasirinia, World and Asian Games Champion.
- Nasrollah Dehnavi, Asian Games Champion and World Bronze Medalist.
