= Weightlifting at the 1987 National Games of China =

Weightlifting was part of the 1987 National Games of China held in Guangdong. Only men competed in ten bodyweight categories, although the first women's World Championships (which featured a Chinese team) was also held in 1987.

The competition program at the National Games mirrors that of the Olympic Games as only medals for the total achieved are awarded, but not for individual lifts in either the snatch or clean and jerk. Likewise an athlete failing to register a snatch result cannot advance to the clean and jerk.

== Medal summary ==
=== Men ===
| Event | Gold | | Silver | | Bronze | |
|---|---|---|---|---|---|---|
| 52 kg | He Zhuoqiang; Guangdong | 265 kg | Zhang Shoulie; Guangxi | 250 kg | Qiu Yuanlei; Sichuan | 245 kg |
| 56 kg | He Yingqiang; Guangdong | 282.5 kg | Wang Caixi; Zhejiang | 267.5 kg | Lin Xinhui; Fujian | 255 kg |
| 60 kg | Ye Huanming; Guangdong | 287.5 kg | Hu Guifu; Hunan | 282.5 kg | Wang Yong; Sichuan | 282.5 kg |
| 67.5 kg | Li Jinhe; Guangdong | 322.5 kg | Yang Xiujian; Hunan | 315 kg | Yao Jingyuan; Liaoning | 312.5 kg |
| 75 kg | Ma Wenzhu; Shandong | 337.5 kg | Li Shunzhu; Jiangsu | 335 kg | Qian Zelin; Anhui | 320 kg |
| 82.5 kg | Cai Yanshu; PLA | 350 kg | Li Bingjun; Shandong | 342.5 kg | Li Guangshun; Hebei | 337.5 kg |
| 90 kg | Yang Bo; Liaoning | 352.5 kg | Feng Changqian; Liaoning | 340 kg | Lü Duoxiang; PLA | 337.5 kg |
| 100 kg | Gu Yining; Liaoning | 352.5 kg | Wang Jianmin; Beijing | 342.5 kg | Li Siqiong; Beijing | 340 kg |
| 110 kg | Wei Peining; Liaoning | 367.5 kg | Wang Guoan; Zhejiang | 357.5 kg | Tao Hui; PLA | 355 kg |
| 110+ kg | Cai Li; Liaoning | 382.5 kg | Weng Weimin; Shanghai | 367.5 kg | Wu Huaibing; Anhui | 357.5 kg |

== Medal table ==
| Rank | Delegation | Gold | Silver | Bronze | Total |
|---|---|---|---|---|---|
| 1 | Liaoning | 4 | 1 | 1 | 6 |
| 2 | Guangdong | 4 | 0 | 0 | 4 |
| 3 | Shandong | 1 | 1 | 0 | 2 |
| 4 | People's Liberation Army | 1 | 0 | 2 | 3 |
| 5 | Hunan | 0 | 2 | 0 | 2 |
| 5 | Zhejiang | 0 | 2 | 0 | 2 |
| 7 | Beijing | 0 | 1 | 1 | 2 |
| 8 | Guangxi | 0 | 1 | 0 | 1 |
| 8 | Jiangsu | 0 | 1 | 0 | 1 |
| 8 | Shanghai | 0 | 1 | 0 | 1 |
| 11 | Anhui | 0 | 0 | 2 | 2 |
| 11 | Sichuan | 0 | 0 | 2 | 2 |
| 13 | Fujian | 0 | 0 | 1 | 1 |
| 13 | Hebei | 0 | 0 | 1 | 1 |
| Totals (14 entries) | | 10 | 10 | 10 | 30 |
