= Asian Weightlifting Championships =

International weightlifting competition

The Asian Weightlifting Championships is a weightlifting championship organised by the Asian Weightlifting Federation for competitors from the Asian countries. It has been held since 1969 for men and 1988 for women. In 2008 the championships provided the official qualification for Asian competitors in the 2008 Beijing Olympics.

== Editions ==
https://intersportstats.com/competition_types/333

- Held as part of the 1957 World Weightlifting Championships and 1965 World Weightlifting Championships (2).
- Held as part of the Weightlifting at the 1964 Summer Olympics (1).
- Held as part of the Weightlifting at the Asian Games (9).

Year	Edition		Venue	Dates	Top Nations		
Year	M	W	Venue	Dates	1st	2nd	3rd
1957	1		Tehran, Iran	8 – 12 November 1957	Iran	Japan	Iraq
1964	2		Tokyo, Japan	11 – 18 October 1964	Japan	South Korea	(Taiwan) Chinese Taipei
1965	3		Tehran, Iran	27 October – 3 November 1965	Iran	Japan	Iraq
1967	-		Tokyo, Japan	(Cancelled)			
1971	4		Manila, Philippines	9 – 11 October 1971	Iran	Indonesia	South Korea
1973	5		Tel Aviv, Israel	(Cancelled)			
1974 (Note: The weightlifting tournaments held during Asian Games in some editions are counted as Asian Weightlifting Championships of the corresponding year.)	6		Tehran, Iran	2 – 5 September 1974	Iran	Japan	South Korea
1975	7		Tel Aviv, Israel	(Cancelled)			
1976	8		Bangkok, Thailand	10 – 12 April 1976	China	Japan	South Korea
1977	9		Baghdad, Iraq	3 – 6 May 1977	https://intersportstats.com/competitions/2000000963		
1978	10		Bangkok, Thailand	10 – 16 December 1978	North Korea	Japan	China
1979	11		Tokyo, Japan	15 – 17 August 1979	Japan	China	Iraq
1980	12		Seoul, South Korea	22 – 25 April 1980	Japan	Iran	South Korea
1981	13		Nagoya, Japan	16 – 19 August 1981	China	South Korea	Syria
1982	14		New Delhi, India	20 – 29 November 1982	China	Japan	South Korea
1983	15		Damascus, Syria	13 – 19 August 1983	North Korea	Iran	China
1984	16		Tabriz, Iran	7 – 10 November 1984	Iran	China	North Korea
1985	17		Jiangxi, China	15 – 20 April 1985	China	South Korea	Iraq
1986	18		Seoul, South Korea	21 September – 1 October 1986	China	South Korea	Japan
1987	19		Ageo, Japan	17 – 19 April 1987	China	Iraq	North Korea
1988	20		Shilong, China	15 – 20 June 1988	China	Iraq	North Korea
1988		1	Jakarta, Indonesia	2 – 4 December 1988	China	Indonesia	South Korea
1989	21		Tehran, Iran	https://intersportstats.com/competitions/2000000973			
1989		2	Shanghai, China	22–24 December 1989	China	South Korea	Chinese Taipei
1990	22	3	Beijing, China	23 September – 1 October 1990	China	South Korea	North Korea
1991	23		Kamisu, Japan	20 – 23 December 1991	China	South Korea	North Korea
1991		4	Manado, Indonesia	24 – 30 August 1991	China	Chinese Taipei	India
1992	24		Fuzhou, China	11 – 15 April 1992	China	South Korea	Iraq
1992		5	Chiang Mai, Thailand	21 – 23 December 1992	China	Chinese Taipei	North Korea
1993	25		Tabriz, Iran	14 – 20 February 1993	China	Iran	Japan
1993		6	Shilong, China	15 – 19 December 1993	China	Chinese Taipei	Thailand
1994	26	7	Hiroshima, Japan	3 – 10 October 1994	China	Kazakhstan	South Korea
1995	27	8	Busan, South Korea	3 – 8 July 1995	China	Kazakhstan	South Korea
1996	28	9	Yachiyo, Japan	4 – 9 April 1996	China	North Korea	Kazakhstan
1997	29	10	Yangzhou, China	8 – 14 July 1997	China	(Taiwan) Chinese Taipei	North Korea
1998	30	11	Bangkok, Thailand	7 – 14 December 1998	China	South Korea	Iran
1999	31	12	Wuhan, China	29 August – 5 September 1999	China	Iran	Chinese Taipei
2000	32	13	Osaka, Japan	2 – 6 May 2000	China	India	Qatar
2001	33	14	Jeonju, South Korea	13 – 17 July 2001	China	Qatar	South Korea
2002	34	15	Busan, South Korea	30 September – 10 October 2002	China	Kazakhstan	Iran
2003	35	16	Qinhuangdao, China	10 – 14 September 2003	China	Iran	South Korea
2004	36	17	Almaty, Kazakhstan	7 – 12 April 2004	China	Kazakhstan	Qatar
2005	37	18	Dubai, United Arab Emirates	23 September – 1 October 2005	China	Thailand	Kazakhstan
2007	38	19	Tai'an, China	21 – 27 April 2007	China	Vietnam	Qatar
2008	39	20	Kanazawa, Japan	26 April – 5 May 2008	China	Iran	Thailand
2009	40	21	Taldykorgan, Kazakhstan	11 – 15 May 2009	China	Kazakhstan	Iran
2010	41	22	Guangzhou, China	13 – 19 November 2010	China	Kazakhstan	North Korea
2011	42	23	Tongling, China	13 – 17 April 2011	China	Iran	Macau
2012	43	24	Pyeongtaek, South Korea	24 – 30 April 2012	China	Iran	Chinese Taipei
2013	44	25	Astana, Kazakhstan	21 – 25 June 2013	North Korea	China	Chinese Taipei
2015	45	26	Phuket, Thailand	6 – 11 September 2015	China	Kazakhstan	Philippines
2016	46	27	Tashkent, Uzbekistan	21 – 30 April 2016	China	Thailand	Iran
2017	47	28	Ashgabat, Turkmenistan	23 – 29 April 2017	China	North Korea	Iran
2019	48	29	Ningbo, China	20 – 28 April 2019	China	North Korea	Iran
2020 (Note: Was held in April 2021 due to the COVID-19 pandemic.)	49	30	Tashkent, Uzbekistan	16 – 25 April 2021	China	Iran	Chinese Taipei
2022	50	31	Manama, Bahrain	6 – 16 October 2022	China	Kazakhstan	Vietnam
2023	51	32	Jinju, South Korea	5 – 13 May 2023	China	South Korea	Chinese Taipei
2024	52	33	Tashkent, Uzbekistan	3 – 10 February 2024	North Korea	South Korea	Uzbekistan
2025	53	34	Jiangshan, China	9 – 15 May 2025	China	North Korea	Iran
2026	54	35	Gandhinagar, India	11 – 17 May 2026	China	North Korea	Chinese Taipei

== Medal table ==
Updated till the 2026 Asian Championships (Asian Games not included)

- Men's

Rank	Nation	Gold	Silver	Bronze	Total
1	China (CHN)	373	229	98	700
2	Iran (IRI)	131	124	126	381
3	South Korea (KOR)	92	142	125	359
4	North Korea (PRK)	84	82	78	244
5	Kazakhstan (KAZ)	58	49	71	178
6	Japan (JPN)	52	52	97	201
7	Uzbekistan (UZB)	42	55	53	150
8	Iraq (IRQ)	37	51	34	122
9	Qatar (QAT)	25	18	8	51
10	Vietnam (VIE)	16	23	24	63
11	Chinese Taipei (TPE)	14	30	51	95
12	Kyrgyzstan (KGZ)	13	23	25	61
13	Thailand (THA)	12	21	37	70
14	Indonesia (INA)	11	25	45	81
15	Syria (SYR)	11	10	12	33
16	Bahrain (BRN)	10	5	0	15
17	Lebanon (LBN)	9	8	4	21
18	Philippines (PHI)	4	8	8	20
19	Turkmenistan (TKM)	3	10	26	39
20	Saudi Arabia (KSA)	3	4	14	21
21	Pakistan (PAK)	2	8	4	14
22	Israel (ISR)	2	3	1	6
23	Malaysia (MAS)	0	7	3	10
24	India (IND)	0	6	22	28
25	Singapore (SGP)	0	3	1	4
26	Mongolia (MGL)	0	1	4	5
27	Sri Lanka (SRI)	0	1	2	3
28	United Arab Emirates (UAE)	0	0	3	3
29	Oman (OMA)	0	0	2	2
30	Nepal (NEP)	0	0	1	1
Totals (30 entries)		1,004	998	979	2,981

- Women's

Rank	Nation	Gold	Silver	Bronze	Total
1	China (CHN)	462	122	53	637
2	North Korea (PRK)	65	71	39	175
3	Chinese Taipei (TPE)	59	136	98	293
4	Thailand (THA)	41	83	79	203
5	South Korea (KOR)	26	85	102	213
6	Kazakhstan (KAZ)	21	29	43	93
7	India (IND)	18	57	80	155
8	Vietnam (VIE)	13	30	28	71
9	Mongolia (MGL)	9	6	12	27
10	Macau (MAC)	7	0	4	11
11	Philippines (PHI)	5	25	13	43
12	Japan (JPN)	4	23	59	86
13	Iran (IRI)	3	2	6	11
14	Indonesia (INA)	2	41	49	92
15	Uzbekistan (UZB)	1	11	28	40
16	Turkmenistan (TKM)	1	6	14	21
17	Bahrain (BRN)	1	2	0	3
18	Hong Kong (HKG)	0	3	5	8
19	Qatar (QAT)	0	2	1	3
20	Kyrgyzstan (KGZ)	0	1	1	2
21	Iraq (IRQ)	0	0	1	1
21	Lebanon (LBN)	0	0	1	1
21	Myanmar (MYA)	0	0	1	1
Totals (23 entries)		738	735	717	2,190

== See also ==
- Weightlifting at the Asian Games
