= Weightlifting at the 1994 Asian Games =

- Venue: Saeki Ward Sports Center
- Dates: 3–10 October 1994

Weightlifting was contested from October 3 to October 10, 1994, at the 1994 Asian Games in Saeki Ward Sports Center, Hiroshima, Japan.

== Medalists ==
=== Men ===
Event	Gold	Silver	Bronze
54 kg	Lan Shizhang; China	Yang Bin; China	Toshiyuki Notomi; Japan
59 kg	Chun Byung-kwan; South Korea	Tang Lingsheng; China	Hiroshi Ikehata; Japan
64 kg	Zhang Youyi; China	Peng Song; China	Liao Hsing-chou; Chinese Taipei
70 kg	Zhan Xugang; China	Kim Hak-bong; South Korea	Vassiliy Pozyomin; Kazakhstan
76 kg	Altymyrat Orazdurdyýew; Turkmenistan	Hideo Mizuno; Japan	Mital Sharipov; Kyrgyzstan
83 kg	Vyacheslav Nyu; Kazakhstan	Li Yunnan; China	Wang Yuanfeng; China
91 kg	Andrey Makarov; Kazakhstan	Anatoly Khrapaty; Kazakhstan	Chun Yong-sung; South Korea
99 kg	Sergey Kopytov; Kazakhstan	Choi Dong-kil; South Korea	Dmitriy Frolov; Uzbekistan
108 kg	Cui Wenhua; China	Chung Dae-jin; South Korea	Rafail Ziganchin; Kazakhstan
+108 kg	Kim Tae-hyun; South Korea	Wei Tiehan; China	Igor Khalilov; Uzbekistan

=== Women ===
Event	Gold	Silver	Bronze
46 kg	Guan Hong; China	Misasanga Wangkiree; Thailand	Kunjarani Devi; India
50 kg	Liu Xiuhua; China	Supeni Wasiman; Indonesia	Choi Myung-shik; South Korea
54 kg	Zhang Juhua; China	Karnam Malleswari; India	Patmawati Abdul Hamid; Indonesia
59 kg	Chen Xiaomin; China	Khassaraporn Suta; Thailand	Neelam Setti Laxmi; India
64 kg	Lei Li; China	Kuo Shu-fen; Chinese Taipei	Yuriko Takahashi; Japan
70 kg	Tang Weifang; China	Wasana Putcharkarn; Thailand	Win Win Maw; Myanmar
76 kg	Hua Ju; China	Kumi Haseba; Japan	Lin Ya-ching; Chinese Taipei
83 kg	Zhang Xiaoli; China	Chen Shu-chih; Chinese Taipei	Kamala Chaiporn; Thailand
+83 kg	Li Yajuan; China	Chen Hsiao-lien; Chinese Taipei	Bharti Singh; India

== Medal table ==
Rank	Nation	Gold	Silver	Bronze	Total
1	China (CHN)	13	5	1	19
2	Kazakhstan (KAZ)	3	1	2	6
3	South Korea (KOR)	2	3	2	7
4	Turkmenistan (TKM)	1	0	0	1
5	Chinese Taipei (TPE)	0	3	2	5
6	Thailand (THA)	0	3	1	4
7	Japan (JPN)	0	2	3	5
8	India (IND)	0	1	3	4
9	Indonesia (INA)	0	1	1	2
10	Uzbekistan (UZB)	0	0	2	2
11	Kyrgyzstan (KGZ)	0	0	1	1
11	Myanmar (MYA)	0	0	1	1
Totals (12 entries)		19	19	19	57
