= Weightlifting at the 1966 Asian Games =

- Venue: Bangkok Cultural Hall
- Dates: 12–18 December 1966

Weightlifting was contested from 12 December to 18 December 1966 at the 1966 Asian Games in Cultural Hall, Bangkok, Thailand.

The competition included only men's events for eight different weight categories. Iran finished 1st at the medal table by winning three gold medals.

== Medalists ==
Event	Gold	Silver	Bronze
Flyweight (52 kg)	Chaiya Sukchinda; Thailand	Tetsuhide Sasaki; Japan	Mohammad Nasehi; Iran
Bantamweight (56 kg)	Mohammad Nassiri; Iran	Chua Phung Kim; Singapore	Yu In-ho; South Korea
Featherweight (60 kg)	Yoshinobu Miyake; Japan	Ahn Jong-chul; South Korea	Chang Ming-chung; Republic of China
Lightweight (67.5 kg)	Parviz Jalayer; Iran	Takeo Kimura; Japan	Won Shin-hee; South Korea
Middleweight (75 kg)	Masushi Ouchi; Japan	Lee Chun-sik; South Korea	Mohammad Ami-Tehrani; Iran
Light heavyweight (82.5 kg)	Lee Jong-sup; South Korea	Hideki Fujimoto; Japan	Lee Yi-hsiung; Republic of China
Middle heavyweight (90 kg)	Lee Hyung-woo; South Korea	Masafumi Tsugioka; Japan	Esmaeil Doroudian; Iran
Heavyweight (+90 kg)	Manouchehr Boroumand; Iran	Hwang Ho-dong; South Korea	Reza Esteki; Iran

== Medal table ==
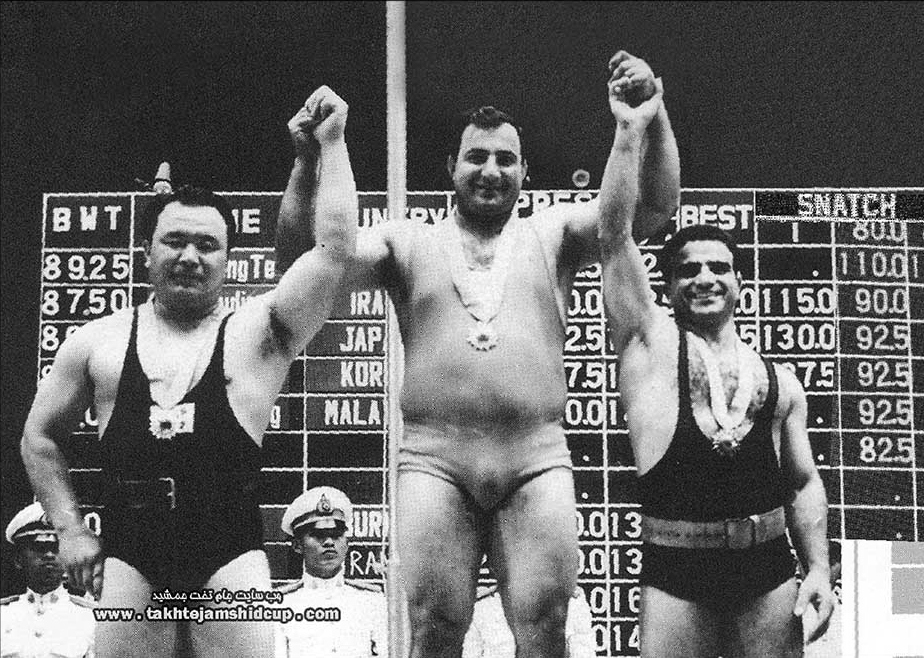
Medal winners of +90 kg. From left to right, Hwang Ho-dong, Manouchehr Boroumand and Reza Esteki

Rank	Nation	Gold	Silver	Bronze	Total
1	Iran (IRN)	3	0	4	7
2	Japan (JPN)	2	4	0	6
3	South Korea (KOR)	2	3	2	7
4	Thailand (THA)	1	0	0	1
5	Singapore (SIN)	0	1	0	1
6	Republic of China (ROC)	0	0	2	2
Totals (6 entries)		8	8	8	24
