= Weightlifting at the 1974 Asian Games =

- Venue: Aryamehr Weightlifting Hall
- Dates: 2–5 September 1974

Weightlifting was contested from September 2 to September 5 at the 1974 Asian Games in Aryamehr Weightlifting Hall, Tehran, Iran. Only in this edition a medal was awarded for each of the snatch and clean and jerk phases and for the combined total.

== Medalists ==
=== Total ===
Event	Gold	Silver	Bronze
Flyweight (52 kg)	Mohammad Nassiri; Iran	Aung Gyi; Burma	Masatomo Takeuchi; Japan
Bantamweight (56 kg)	Kenkichi Ando; Japan	Chen Manlin; China	Han Gyong-si; North Korea
Featherweight (60 kg)	Kazumasa Hirai; Japan	Song Sung-rim; North Korea	Khin Myint; Burma
Lightweight (67.5 kg)	Won Shin-hee; South Korea	Nasrollah Dehnavi; Iran	Takahiro Nakata; Japan
Middleweight (75 kg)	An Won-geun; North Korea	Etsuo Mitsuishi; Japan	Mehdi Attar-Ashrafi; Iran
Light heavyweight (82.5 kg)	Sueo Fujishiro; Japan	Ebrahim Pourdejam; Iran	Badr Yaseen; Iraq
Middle heavyweight (90 kg)	Ali Vali; Iran	Qian Yukai; China	Adi Brana; Israel
Heavyweight (110 kg)	Houshang Kargarnejad; Iran	Yun Sook-woon; South Korea	Shlomo Ben-Lulu; Israel
Super heavyweight (+110 kg)	Akbar Shokrollahi; Iran	Hafez Hassani; Iran	Suhail Khalil; Iraq

=== Snatch ===
Event	Gold	Silver	Bronze
Flyweight (52 kg)	Aung Gyi; Burma	Mohammad Nassiri; Iran	Masatomo Takeuchi; Japan
Bantamweight (56 kg)	Kenkichi Ando; Japan	Tin Sein; Burma	Chen Manlin; China
Featherweight (60 kg)	Kazumasa Hirai; Japan	Song Sung-rim; North Korea	Khin Myint; Burma
Lightweight (67.5 kg)	Won Shin-hee; South Korea	Nasrollah Dehnavi; Iran	Takahiro Nakata; Japan
Middleweight (75 kg)	Etsuo Mitsuishi; Japan	An Won-geun; North Korea	Mehdi Attar-Ashrafi; Iran
Light heavyweight (82.5 kg)	Sueo Fujishiro; Japan	Ebrahim Pourdejam; Iran	Lee Chun-sik; South Korea
Middle heavyweight (90 kg)	Qian Yukai; China	Ali Vali; Iran	Adi Brana; Israel
Heavyweight (110 kg)	Houshang Kargarnejad; Iran	Shlomo Ben-Lulu; Israel	Yun Sook-woon; South Korea
Super heavyweight (+110 kg)	Akbar Shokrollahi; Iran	Hwang Ho-dong; South Korea	Hafez Hassani; Iran

=== Clean & jerk ===
Event	Gold	Silver	Bronze
Flyweight (52 kg)	Mohammad Nassiri; Iran	Pak Dong-geun; North Korea	Masatomo Takeuchi; Japan
Bantamweight (56 kg)	Kenkichi Ando; Japan	Chen Manlin; China	Han Gyong-si; North Korea
Featherweight (60 kg)	Kazumasa Hirai; Japan	Om Jong-guk; North Korea	Song Sung-rim; North Korea
Lightweight (67.5 kg)	Won Shin-hee; South Korea	Nasrollah Dehnavi; Iran	Moon Sok-joon; North Korea
Middleweight (75 kg)	An Won-geun; North Korea	Mehdi Attar-Ashrafi; Iran	Muhammad Arshad Malik; Pakistan
Light heavyweight (82.5 kg)	Sueo Fujishiro; Japan	Ebrahim Pourdejam; Iran	Badr Yaseen; Iraq
Middle heavyweight (90 kg)	Ali Vali; Iran	Qian Yukai; China	Adi Brana; Israel
Heavyweight (110 kg)	Houshang Kargarnejad; Iran	Yun Sook-woon; South Korea	Yoji Iwasaki; Japan
Super heavyweight (+110 kg)	Hafez Hassani; Iran	Akbar Shokrollahi; Iran	Suhail Khalil; Iraq

== Medal table ==
Rank	Nation	Gold	Silver	Bronze	Total
1	Iran (IRN)	10	11	3	24
2	Japan (JPN)	10	1	6	17
3	South Korea (KOR)	3	3	2	8
4	North Korea (PRK)	2	5	4	11
5	China (CHN)	1	4	1	6
6	Burma (BIR)	1	2	2	5
7	Israel (ISR)	0	1	4	5
8	Iraq (IRQ)	0	0	4	4
9	Pakistan (PAK)	0	0	1	1
Totals (9 entries)		27	27	27	81
