= Weightlifting at the 1979 National Games of China =

Weightlifting was part of the 1979 National Games of China held in Beijing. Only men competed in ten bodyweight categories and for the first time in National Games history the classification matched the international standard at the time.

The competition program at the National Games mirrors that of the Olympic Games as only medals for the total achieved are awarded, but not for individual lifts in either the snatch or clean and jerk. Likewise an athlete failing to register a snatch result cannot advance to the clean and jerk.

== Medal summary ==
=== Men ===
| Event | Gold | | Silver | | Bronze | |
|---|---|---|---|---|---|---|
| 52 kg | Cai Juncheng; Guangdong | 235 kg | Wu Shude; Guangxi | 235 kg | Yang Haiping; Jiangsu | 227.5 kg |
| 56 kg | He Yicheng; Hunan | 250 kg | Zhang Dizhou; Guangdong | 240 kg | Xiao Mingyun; Guangxi | 232.5 kg |
| 60 kg | Tan Hanyong; Guangxi | 270 kg | Chen Jiancai; Hubei | 262.5 kg | Chen Huasheng; Fujian | 260 kg |
| 67.5 kg | Zhao Xinmin; Jiangsu | 310 kg | Yao Jingyuan; Liaoning | 287.5 kg | Xu Kehua; Jiangsu | 285 kg |
| 75 kg | Li Shunzhu; Jiangsu | 310 kg | Rong Jiahuai; Hubei | 297.5 kg | Kuang Suihua; PLA | 292.5 kg |
| 82.5 kg | Cai Fuqiang; Beijing | 307.5 kg | Zuo Decai; Beijing | 302.5 kg | Wu Yuwen; Hebei | 292.5 kg |
| 90 kg | Ma Wenguang; Shandong | 335 kg | Zhang Naizhu; Jilin | 305 kg | Wang Guoxin; Jiangsu | 300 kg |
| 100 kg | Song Zhenzhu; Shandong | 310 kg | Xi Hanxiang; Hubei | 300 kg | Tian Shulin; Tianjin | 300 kg |
| 110 kg | Liu Guanglin; PLA | 300 kg | Wang Xiaoping; Jilin | 282.5 kg | Chen Ping; Jiangsu | 280 kg |
| 110+ kg | Yang Huaiqing; Shandong | 332.5 kg | Guo Weiru; Heilongjiang | 315 kg | Meng Naidong; Beijing | 285 kg |

== Medal table ==
| Rank | Delegation | Gold | Silver | Bronze | Total |
|---|---|---|---|---|---|
| 1 | Shandong | 3 | 0 | 0 | 3 |
| 2 | Jiangsu | 2 | 0 | 4 | 6 |
| 3 | Beijing | 1 | 1 | 1 | 3 |
| 3 | Guangxi | 1 | 1 | 1 | 3 |
| 5 | Guangdong | 1 | 1 | 0 | 2 |
| 6 | People's Liberation Army | 1 | 0 | 1 | 2 |
| 7 | Hunan | 1 | 0 | 0 | 1 |
| 8 | Hubei | 0 | 3 | 0 | 3 |
| 9 | Jilin | 0 | 2 | 0 | 2 |
| 10 | Heilongjiang | 0 | 1 | 0 | 1 |
| 10 | Liaoning | 0 | 1 | 0 | 1 |
| 12 | Fujian | 0 | 0 | 1 | 1 |
| 12 | Hebei | 0 | 0 | 1 | 1 |
| 12 | Tianjin | 0 | 0 | 1 | 1 |
| Totals (14 entries) | | 10 | 10 | 10 | 30 |
