= Weightlifting at the 1970 Asian Games =

- Venue: Bangkok Cultural Hall
- Dates: 10–17 December 1970
- Competitors: 51 from 12 nations

Weightlifting was contested from December 10 to December 17 at the 1970 Asian Games in Bangkok, Thailand. The competition included only men's events for eight different weight categories.

Japan finished first in the medal table with 4 gold medals.

== Medalists ==
Event	Gold	Silver	Bronze
Flyweight (52 kg)	Takeshi Horikoshi; Japan	Salvador del Rosario; Philippines	Mohammad Nasehi; Iran
Bantamweight (56 kg)	Mohammad Nassiri; Iran	Kenkichi Ando; Japan	Choi Mun-jae; South Korea
Featherweight (60 kg)	Yoshiyuki Miyake; Japan	Madek Kasman; Indonesia	Than Tun; Burma
Lightweight (67.5 kg)	Nasrollah Dehnavi; Iran	Won Shin-hee; South Korea	Htein Win; Burma
Middleweight (75 kg)	Nobuyuki Hatta; Japan	Daniel Gevargiz; Iran	Lee Chun-sik; South Korea
Light heavyweight (82.5 kg)	Masushi Ouchi; Japan	Chao Cheng-hsueng; Republic of China	Park Moon-soo; South Korea
Middle heavyweight (90 kg)	Yun Sook-woon; South Korea	Hideki Fujimoto; Japan	Ebrahim Pourdejam; Iran
Heavyweight (110 kg)	Kim Dae-jhu; South Korea	Abdul Rosjid; Indonesia	Houshang Kargarnejad; Iran

== Medal table ==
Rank	Nation	Gold	Silver	Bronze	Total
1	Japan (JPN)	4	2	0	6
2	Iran (IRN)	2	1	3	6
2	South Korea (KOR)	2	1	3	6
4	Indonesia (INA)	0	2	0	2
5	Philippines (PHI)	0	1	0	1
5	Republic of China (ROC)	0	1	0	1
7	Burma (BIR)	0	0	2	2
Totals (7 entries)		8	8	8	24

== Participating nations ==
A total of 51 athletes from 12 nations competed in weightlifting at the 1970 Asian Games:

- Burma (6)
- India (1)
- Indonesia (6)
- Iran (8)
- Japan (7)
- Malaysia (1)
- Pakistan (2)
- Philippines (2)
- Republic of China (4)
- Singapore (1)
- South Korea (7)
- Thailand (6)
