= Weightlifting at the 1978 Asian Games =

- Dates: 10–16 December 1978

Weightlifting was contested at the 1978 Asian Games in Bangkok, Thailand. The competition included only men's events for ten different weight categories.

== Medalists ==
Event	Gold	Silver	Bronze
52 kg	Han Gyong-si; North Korea	Im Jung-gwan; North Korea	Cai Juncheng; China
56 kg	Yang Eui-yong; North Korea	Lee Myung-su; South Korea	Muhammad Manzoor; Pakistan
60 kg	Song Sung-rim; North Korea	Tan Hanyong; China	Takashi Saito; Japan
67.5 kg	Kazumasa Hirai; Japan	Zhao Xinmin; China	Ri Gwang-ju; North Korea
75 kg	Mohamed Tarabulsi; Lebanon	Tamotsu Sunami; Japan	An Won-geun; North Korea
82.5 kg	Kaoru Sato; Japan	Ryu Dong-il; North Korea	Talal Hassoun; Iraq
90 kg	Ahn Ji-young; South Korea	Hafidh Shihab; Iraq	Sann Myint; Burma
100 kg	Mitsumasa Sato; Japan	Raef Ftouni; Lebanon	Han Jin-suk; North Korea
110 kg	Talal Najjar; Syria	Song Zhenzhu; China	Tsuneji Shibasaki; Japan
+110 kg	Yang Huaiqing; China	Tariq Al-Adeeb; Iraq	Mahmoud Mansour; Iraq

== Medal table ==
Rank	Nation	Gold	Silver	Bronze	Total
1	North Korea (PRK)	3	2	3	8
2	Japan (JPN)	3	1	2	6
3	China (CHN)	1	3	1	5
4	Lebanon (LIB)	1	1	0	2
4	South Korea (KOR)	1	1	0	2
6	Syria (SYR)	1	0	0	1
7	Iraq (IRQ)	0	2	2	4
8	Burma (BIR)	0	0	1	1
8	Pakistan (PAK)	0	0	1	1
Totals (9 entries)		10	10	10	30
