= Weightlifting at the 1982 Asian Games =

- Dates: 20–29 November 1982

Weightlifting was contested from 20 November to 29 November 1982 at the 1982 Asian Games in New Delhi, India. The competition included only men's events for ten different weight categories.

== Medalists ==
Event	Gold	Silver	Bronze
52 kg	Kazushito Manabe; Japan	Cai Juncheng; China	Maman Suryaman; Indonesia
56 kg	Wu Shude; China	Yang Eui-yong; North Korea	Chang Je-hwan; North Korea
60 kg	Chen Weiqiang; China	Ri Hi-bong; North Korea	Tan Hanyong; China
67.5 kg	Yao Jingyuan; China	Yatsuo Shimaya; Japan	Zhao Xinmin; China
75 kg	Ali Pakizehjam; Iran	Li Shunzhu; China	Mohammed Yaseen; Iraq
82.5 kg	Ryoji Isaoka; Japan	Mohamed Tarabulsi; Lebanon	Kim Hung-sam; North Korea
90 kg	Ma Wenguang; China	Mehran Eslampour; Iran	Kim Chul-hyun; South Korea
100 kg	Ahn Ji-young; South Korea	Kensuke Matsuo; Japan	Gian Singh Cheema; India
110 kg	Ahn Hyo-jak; South Korea	Pak Bong-jun; North Korea	Tara Singh; India
+110 kg	Talal Najjar; Syria	Ali Vadi; Iran	Meng Naidong; China

== Medal table ==
Rank	Nation	Gold	Silver	Bronze	Total
1	China (CHN)	4	2	3	9
2	Japan (JPN)	2	2	0	4
3	South Korea (KOR)	2	0	1	3
4	Iran (IRN)	1	2	0	3
5	Syria (SYR)	1	0	0	1
6	North Korea (PRK)	0	3	2	5
7	Lebanon (LIB)	0	1	0	1
8	India (IND)	0	0	2	2
9	Indonesia (INA)	0	0	1	1
9	Iraq (IRQ)	0	0	1	1
Totals (10 entries)		10	10	10	30
