= Burma at the 1974 Asian Games =

- IOC code: BIR

in Tehran
- Medals Ranked 14th: Gold 1 Silver 2 Bronze 3 Total 6

Asian Games appearances (overview)
- 1951; 1954; 1958; 1962; 1966; 1970; 1974; 1978; 1982; 1986; 1990; 1994; 1998; 2002; 2006; 2010; 2014; 2018; 2022; 2026

Burma participated in the 1974 Asian Games held in Tehran, Iran from 1 to 16 September 1974. Athletes from Burma won overall six medals, including one gold medal and finished 14th in a medal table.

== Medal summary ==
=== Medal table ===
Sport	Gold	Silver	Bronze	Total
Weightlifting	1	2	2	4
Athletics	0	0	1	1
Total	1	2	3	6

=== Medalists ===
Medal	Name	Sport	Event
Gold	Aung Gyi	Weightlifting	Men's Snatch Flyweight (52kg)
Silver	Aung Gyi	Weightlifting	Men's Total Flyweight (52kg)
Silver	Khin Myint	Weightlifting	Men's Snatch Feather Weight (60kg)
Bronze	Tin Sein	Weightlifting	Men's Snatch BantamWeight (56kg)
Bronze	Khin Myint	Weightlifting	Men's Total Feather weight (60kg)
Bronze	Mar Mar Min; Nwe Nwe Yee; Than Than; Than Than Htay	Athletics	Women's 4 × 400 m
