= Olympic Weightlifting Gymnasium =

Sports hall

Coordinates: 37.516699°N 127.125096°E

Olympic Weightlifting Gymnasium (Korean: 올림픽역도경기장) located in the Olympic Park area of Seoul, South Korea. It was constructed between August 1984 and April 1986, and hosted the weightlifting at the 1986 Asian Games and two years later the same sport at 1988 Summer Olympics.

It has since been renamed to Woori Arts Hall (우리금융아트홀) and is currently a musical theatre.

== Events ==
- Musical Hong Gil Dong from 18 February to 18 April 2010, with the historical figure Hong Gildong played by Sungmin and Yesung of Super Junior.
- Super Junior K.R.Y The 1st Concert – 11 to 13 February 2011.
- Musical Fame from 25 November 2011 to 29 January 2012.
