= Chao Cheng-hsueng =

Taiwanese weightlifter

Personal information
- Nationality: Taiwanese
- Born: 31 January 1940 (age 86)

Sport
- Sport: Weightlifting
Medal record
Representing Republic of China
Asian Games
Silver medal – second place	1970 Bangkok	82.5 kg

Chao Cheng-hsueng (born 31 January 1940) is a Taiwanese weightlifter. He competed in the men's middleweight event at the 1964 Summer Olympics.

He also participated at the 1970 Asian Games and won a silver medal.
