= Muhammad Arshad Malik (weightlifter) =

Pakistani weightlifter (1948–2021)

Personal information
- Native name: محمد ارشد ملک
- Nationality: Pakistani
- Born: 18 May 1948
- Died: 17 February 2021 (aged 72) Gujranwala, Pakistan

Sport
- Sport: Weightlifting

Muhammad Arshad Malik (Urdu:محمد ارشد ملک; 18 May 1948 – 17 February 2021) was a Pakistani weightlifter. He competed at the 1972 Summer Olympics (19th position) and the 1976 Summer Olympics (15th position). He was also the flag bearer for Pakistan at the opening ceremony of 1972 Munich Olympics. He was a bronze medalist at the 1974 Asian Games in Tehran. He also won a gold medal at the 1976 Asian Weightlifting Championships held in Bangkok.
