= Raef Ftouni =

Lebanese weightlifter

Personal information
- Nationality: Lebanese
Medal record
Men's weightlifting
Representing Lebanon
Asian Games
Silver medal – second place	1978 Bangkok	-100 kg

Raef Ftouni (Arabic: رائف فتوني) is a Lebanese weightlifter. He competed in the men's heavyweight I event at the 1980 Summer Olympics. He won a silver medal at the 1978 Asian Games in the -100 kg event.
