= Mohamed Tarabulsi =

Lebanese weightlifter (1950–2002)

Olympic medal record

Men's Weightlifting

Representing Lebanon
Silver medal – second place	1972 Munich	Middleweight

Mohamad Kheir Traboulsi (8 September 1950 – 22 August 2002) was an amateur Lebanese weightlifter (he was a firefighter). At the 1972 Summer Olympics, he won the silver medal in the men's Middleweight category.

== Life and career ==
Traboulsi was born in Beirut on 26 September 1950. At 18 years of age, weighing 67.10 kg, he lifted a total of 377 kg and placed 14th among 20 participants in the 67.5 kg weightlifting category at the Mexico 1968 Olympic games. With 67 kg, he was too light for a height of 167 cm. Yet, in 1969, he set the junior world record of Middleweight with 140 kg, a very great lift, equal to the junior light heavyweight record. In Munich 1972, now weighing 74.05 kg, he lifted 160 + 140 + 172.5 = 472.5 and won the silver medal for the 75 kg weightlifting category. Still in Munich, but in an out of competition attempt to break the world in the snatch, both Aimé Terme of France and Traboulsi attempted to lift 146.5 kg to break the world record, both competitors failed the lift. Traboulsi had already broken that world record in snatch on 2 previous occasions earlier in 1972: he lifted 145.5 kg on 22 Jun 1972 in Beirut, then 146 kg on 30 Jun 1972 in Amman, Jordan. After that failed attempt to break his own record in Munich, he succeeded twice: 147.5kg on 11 Nov 1972 in Beirut and 150 kg on 25 Jan 1973 in Beirut.

Always in the 75 kg category, Traboulsi placed first at the 1975, 1979 and 1983 Mediterranean games, as well as first place at the 1978 Asian games. In the 1982 Asian games, however, he placed second but in the 82.5 kg category. In all, he participated in 3 weightlifting world championships (Havana 1973, Moscow 1980, and Sofia 1986), 3 summer Olympics (Mexico 1968, Munich 1972 and Moscow 1980), 3 Mediterranean games (Algiers 1975, Split 1979 and Casablanca 1983), and 2 Asian games (Bangkok 1978 and New Delhi 1982). Traboulsi died from cancer in 2002, aged almost 52.

== Traboulsi at the Munich 1972 summer Olympic Games ==
Rank	Name	Nationality	Body weight	Military press (kg)				Snatch (kg)				Jerk (kg)				Total (kg)
Rank	Name	Nationality	Body weight	1	2	3	Result	1	2	3	Result	1	2	3	Result	Total (kg)
1st place, gold medalist(s)	Yordan Bikov	Bulgaria	74.50	150.0	155.0	160.0	160.0	135.0	140.0	~~142.5~~	140.0	177.5	185.0	–	185.0	485.0 WR
2nd place, silver medalist(s)	Mohamed Traboulsi	Lebanon	74.05	150.0	155.0	160.0	160.0	140.0	~~145.0~~	~~145.0~~	140.0	~~167.5~~	167.5	172.5	172.5	472.5
3rd place, bronze medalist(s)	Anselmo Silvino	Italy	74.85	150.0	155.0	~~160.0~~	155.0	~~135.0~~	~~135.0~~	140.0	140.0	175.0	~~180.0~~	~~180.0~~	175.0	470.0

Always in Munich, but in an out of competition attempt to break the world record in the snatch, Traboulsi attempted to lift 146.5 kg but failed the lift.

== Traboulsi at the Mediterranean Games ==
Medal	Venue	Sport	Event
Gold	Algiers 1975	Weightlifting	75 kg snatch
Gold	Algiers 1975	Weightlifting	75 kg jerk
Gold	Algiers 1975	Weightlifting	75 kg total
Gold	Split 1979	Weightlifting	75 kg
Gold	Casablanca 1983	Weightlifting	75 kg

Event	Gold	Silver	Bronze
1975 games (– men snatch 75 kg)	Mohamad Traboulsi 142.5 Kg (LIB)	Anselmo Silvino 132.5 Kg (ITA)	Dušan Marković 130 Kg (YUG)
1975 games (– men jerk 75 kg)	Mohamad Traboulsi 165 Kg (LIB)	Anselmo Silvino 165 Kg (ITA)	Dušan Marković 160 Kg (YUG)
1975 games (– men total 75 kg)	Mohamad Traboulsi 307.5 Kg (LIB)	Anselmo Silvino 297.5 Kg (ITA)	Dušan Marković 287.5 Kg (YUG)
1979 games (– men total 75 kg)	Mohamad Traboulsi 310 Kg (140+170) (LIB)	Dušan Marković 295 kg (127,5+167,5) (YUG)	Harun Akkaya 292,5 kg (125+167,5) (TUR)
1983 games (– men total 75 kg)	Mohamad Traboulsi 315 kg (145+170) (LIB)	Harun Akkaya 312,5 kg (137,5+175) (TUR)	Carmelo Raresi 310 kg (135+175) (ITA)

== Tarabulsi at the Asian Games ==
Medal	Venue	Sport	Event
Gold	Bangkok 1978	Weightlifting	75 kg
Silver	New Delhi 1982	Weightlifting	82.5 kg

Event	Gold	Silver	Bronze
1978 games (– 75 kg)	Mohamad Traboulsi (LIB)	Tamotsu Sunami (JPN)	An Won-geun (PRK)
1982 games (– 82.5 kg)	Ryoji Isaoka (JPN)	Mohamad Traboulsi (LIB)	Kim Hung-sam (PRK)
