= Mehdi Attar-Ashrafi =

Iranian weightlifter (1948–2021)

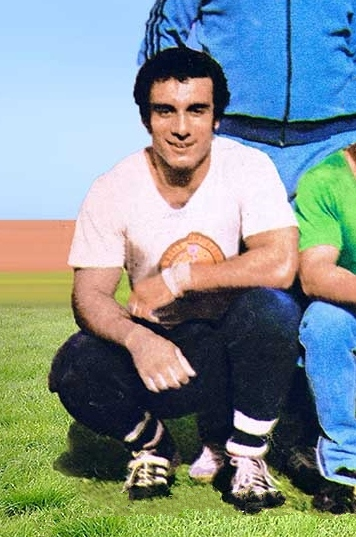
- Attar-Ashrafi in 1975

Personal information
- Born: 23 December 1948 Astaneh-ye Ashrafiyeh, Iran
- Died: 9 January 2021 (aged 72)
- Height: 168 cm (5 ft 6 in)

Sport
- Sport: Weightlifting
Medal record
Representing Iran
Asian Games
Bronze medal – third place	1974 Tehran	-75 kg
Asian Weightlifting Championships
Silver medal – second place	1979 Tokyo	-75 kg

Mehdi Attar-Ashrafi (Persian: مهدی عطار اشرفی; 23 December 1948 – 9 January 2021) was an Iranian middleweight weightlifter. He won a bronze medal at the 1974 Asian Games and a silver at the 1979 Asian Championships and competed at the 1976 Summer Olympics.
