= Muhammad Manzoor =

Pakistani weightlifter (born 1953)

Personal information
- Nationality: Pakistani
- Born: 21 January 1953 (age 73)

Sport
- Sport: Weightlifting
Medal record
Representing Pakistan
Asian Games
| Bronze medal – third place | 1978 Bangkok | 56 kg |

Muhammad Manzoor (born 21 January 1953) is a Pakistani weightlifter. He competed in the men's bantamweight event at the 1976 Summer Olympics.

He also participated at the 1974 and 1978 Asian Games and won a bronze medal in 1978.
