= Indonesia at the 1970 Asian Games =

- IOC code: INA
- NOC: Indonesian Olympic Committee
- Website: www.nocindonesia.or.id (in English)

in Bangkok
- Medals Ranked 9th: Gold 2 Silver 5 Bronze 13 Total 20

Asian Games appearances (overview)
- 1951; 1954; 1958; 1962; 1966; 1970; 1974; 1978; 1982; 1986; 1990; 1994; 1998; 2002; 2006; 2010; 2014; 2018; 2022; 2026

Indonesia participated in the 1970 Asian Games held in Bangkok, Thailand from August 24, 1970, to September 4, 1970. It was ranked ninth in medal count, with two gold, five silver, and thirteen bronze medals, making a total of twenty in all.

== Medal summary ==
=== Medal table ===
Sport	Gold	Silver	Bronze	Total
Badminton	1	2	4	7
Boxing	1	0	4	5
Weightlifting	0	2	0	2
Diving	0	1	1	2
Athletics	0	0	2	2
Sailing	0	0	1	1
Water polo	0	0	1	1
Total	2	5	13	20

=== Medalists ===
Medal	Name	Sport	Event
Gold	Indra Gunawan; Rudy Hartono; Indratno; Mintarja; Muljadi	Badminton	Men's team
Gold	Wiem Gommies	Boxing	Men's Middleweight (75 kg)
Silver	Muljadi	Badminton	Men's singles
Silver	Retno Kustijah; Nurhaena	Badminton	Women's doubles
Silver	Billy Gumulya	Diving	Men's 3 m springboard
Silver	Madek Kasman	Weightlifting	Men's Featherweight (60 kg)
Silver	Abdul Rosjid	Weightlifting	Men's Heavyweight (110 kg)
Bronze	Carolina Rieuwpassa	Athletics	Women's 100 m
Bronze	Carolina Rieuwpassa	Athletics	Women's 200 m
Bronze	Indra Gunawan; Rudy Hartono	Badminton	Men's doubles
Bronze	Minarni	Badminton	Women's singles
Bronze	Utami Dewi Kurniawan; Retno Kustijah; Minarni; Nurhaena; Poppy Tumengkol; Theresia Widiastuti	Badminton	Women's team
Bronze	Rudy Hartono; Minarni	Badminton	Mixed doubles
Bronze	Ferry Moniaga	Boxing	Men's Flyweight (51 kg)
Bronze	Idwan Anwar	Boxing	Men's Bantamweight (54 kg)
Bronze	Jootje Waney	Boxing	Men's Lightweight (60 kg)
Bronze	Rudy Siregar	Boxing	Men's Light heavyweight (81 kg)
Bronze	Mirnawati Hardjolukito	Diving	Women's 3 m springboard
Bronze	John Gunawan; David Udjulawa	Sailing	Men's Flying Dutchman
Bronze	Tengku Achmadsjah; Doddy Agussalim; Johanes Bambang Budihardja; Tengku Kamrol; Pandapotan Nasution; Zakaria Nasution; Gunawan Santoso; Rudy Sastranegara; Valentinus Sutandio; Ade Sutargi; Cebjar Hernowo Triono	Water polo	Men
