= Won Shin-hee =

South Korean weightlifter (born 1946)

Won Shin-Hee
Personal information
- Born: 3 May 1946 (age 80) Kuchon Dong, South Korea
- Height: 162 cm (5 ft 4 in)
- Weight: 68 kg (150 lb)

Sport
- Country: South Korea
- Sport: Weightlifting
- Weight class: 67.5
- Team: National team
Medal record
Men's Weightlifting
Representing South Korea
Asian Games
Gold medal – first place	1974 Tehran	67.5 kg
Silver medal – second place	1970 Bangkok	67.5 kg
Bronze medal – third place	1966 Bangkok	67.5 kg
- Updated on 12 November 2016

Won Shin-hee (Korean: 원신희, born 3 May 1946 in Kuchon Dong) is a South Korean male former weightlifter, who competed in the 67.5 category and represented South Korea at international competitions. He won the bronze medal in the clean & jerk at the 1970 World Weightlifting Championships lifting 165.0 kg. He participated at the 1968 Summer Olympics and 1972 Summer Olympics.
