= Yun Chol (weightlifter) =

North Korean weightlifter (born 1966)

Personal information
- Native name: 윤철
- Nationality: North Korean
- Born: 21 February 1966 (age 59)

Sport
- Sport: Weightlifting

Yun Chol (born 21 February 1966) is a North Korean weightlifter. He competed in the men's middle heavyweight event at the 1992 Summer Olympics. He also won a silver medal at the 1990 Asian Games and finished seventh at the 1990 World Weightlifting Championships.
