= Madek Kasman =

Indonesian weightlifter (born 1937)

Personal information
- Nationality: Indonesian
- Born: 12 February 1937 (age 89) Medan, Indonesia

Sport
- Sport: Weightlifting
Medal record
Men's weightlifting
Representing Indonesia
Asian Games
Silver medal – second place	1970 Bangkok	60 kg
Asian Championships
Bronze medal – third place	1971 Manila	67.5 kg

Madek Kasman (born 12 February 1937) is an Indonesian weightlifter. He competed in the men's featherweight event at the 1968 Summer Olympics.
