= Reza Esteki =

Iranian weightlifter (1937–2004)

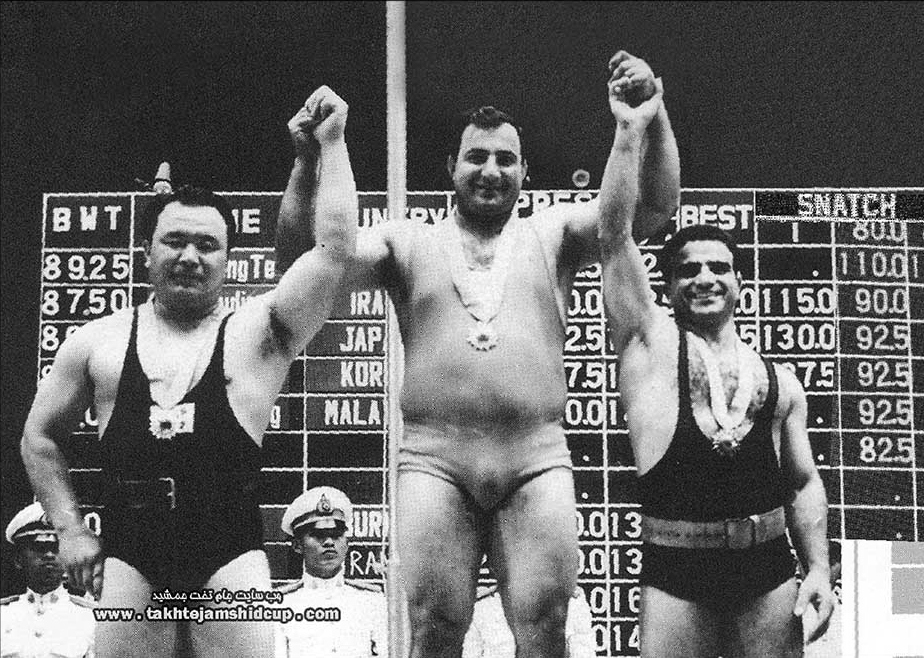
- Reza Esteki (right) at 1966 Asian Games

Personal information
- Born: 11 May 1937 Isfahan, Iran
- Died: 25 February 2004 (aged 66) Isfahan, Iran

Sport
- Sport: Weightlifting
Medal record
Representing Iran
Asian Games
Bronze medal – third place	1966 Bangkok	+90 kg

Reza Esteki (Persian: رضا استکی, 11 May 1937 – 25 February 2004) was an Iranian weightlifter. He won the bronze medal at the 1966 Asian Games, He also participated at the 1964 Summer Olympics.
