= India at the 1990 Asian Games =

- IOC code: IND
- NOC: Indian Olympic Association

in Beijing
- Flag bearer: P. T. Usha
- Medals Ranked 12th: Gold 1 Silver 8 Bronze 14 Total 23

Asian Games appearances (overview)
- 1951; 1954; 1958; 1962; 1966; 1970; 1974; 1978; 1982; 1986; 1990; 1994; 1998; 2002; 2006; 2010; 2014; 2018; 2022; 2026

India participated in the 1990 Asian Games held in Beijing, China from September 22 to October 7, 1990. Ranked 12th with 1 gold medals, 8 silver medals and 14 bronze medals with a total of 23 over-all medals. India won Gold medal in Kabaddi.

== Medals by sport ==
Sport	Gold	Silver	Bronze	Total
Athletics	0	4	2	6
Boxing	0	0	1	1
Hockey	0	1	0	1
Kabaddi	1	0	0	1
Rowing	0	0	4	4
Sailing	0	0	2	2
Wrestling	0	1	1	2
Shooting	0	0	1	1
Tennis	0	0	1	1
Weightlifting	0	2	2	4
Total	1	8	14	23
