= Daniel Gevargiz =

Iranian weightlifter (1940–2020)

Personal information
- Born: 8 April 1940 Urmia, Iran
- Died: 27 March 2020 (aged 79) Karaj, Iran

Sport
- Sport: Weightlifting
Medal record
Representing Iran
Asian Games
| Silver medal – second place | 1970 Bangkok | 75 kg |

Daniel Gevargiznejad (Persian: دانیل گورگیزنژاد, 8 April 1940 – 27 March 2020) was an Assyrian-Iranian weightlifter. He won the silver medal at the 1970 Asian Games. He also participated in the 1968 Summer Olympics.
