= Kazushito Manabe =

Japanese weightlifter (born 1958)

Personal information
- Born: October 12, 1958 (age 67) Niihama, Ehime, Japan
- Height: 1.53 m (5 ft 0 in)
- Weight: 52 kg (115 lb)

Sport
- Sport: Weightlifting
Medal record
Representing Japan
Olympic Games
Bronze medal – third place	1984 Los Angeles	Flyweight; 102.5+130 kg
World Championships
Bronze medal – third place	1981 Lille	Flyweight; 107.5+132.5 kg
Bronze medal – third place	1984 Los Angeles	Flyweight; 102.5+130 kg
Asian Games
Gold medal – first place	1982 New Delhi	Flyweight
Silver medal – second place	1986 Seoul	Flyweight

Kazushito Manabe (真鍋和人, Manabe Kazushito; born October 12, 1958) is a retired Japanese weightlifter. He won a bronze medal in the flyweight category at the 1984 Summer Olympics, as well as two bronze medals at world championships in 1981 and 1984; weightlifting at the latter championships was combined with the 1984 Olympics. He finished eighth at the 1988 Games.

He graduated from the Niihama Technical High School and later worked at the Izumi Chemical company.
