= Li Yunnan =

Chinese weightlifter (born 1971)

Personal information
- Nationality: Chinese
- Born: 2 February 1971 (age 54)

Sport
- Sport: Weightlifting

Li Yunnan (born 2 February 1971) is a Chinese weightlifter. He competed in the men's light heavyweight event at the 1992 Summer Olympics. He also won a silver medal at the 1994 Asian Games.
