= Kim Tae-hyun (weightlifter) =

South Korean weightlifter (born 1969)

Personal information
- Born: 7 April 1969 (age 57) Boseong County, South Jeolla Province
- Height: 185 cm (6 ft 1 in)
- Weight: 133.63 kg (295 lb)

Sport
- Country: South Korea
- Sport: Weightlifting
- Weight class: +105 kg
- Team: National team
Medal record
World Championships
| Bronze medal – third place | 1991 Donaueschingen | +110kg |
Asian Games
| Gold medal – first place | 1990 Beijing | 110 kg |
| Gold medal – first place | 1994 Hiroshima | +108 kg |
| Gold medal – first place | 1998 Bangkok | +105 kg |
- Updated on 3 October 2016

Kim Tae-hyun (Korean: 김태현; born 7 April 1969) is a South Korean male weightlifter, competing in the +105 kg category and representing South Korea at international competitions. He participated at the 1992 Summer Olympics in the +110 kg event, at the 1996 Summer Olympics in the +108 kg event and at the 2000 Summer Olympics in the +105 kg event. He competed at world championships, most recently at the 1999 World Weightlifting Championships.

Kim was born in Boseong County, South Jeolla Province. He did his early education at Deukryang Middle School and Jeonnam Physical Education High School and his tertiary studies at Korea National Sport University. After his retirement from competitive weightlifting, he became a representative for a construction company.

== Major results ==
(bronze) - 1991 World Championships Unlimited class (400.0 kg)
(gold) - 1990 Asian Games Heavyweight class
(gold) - 1994 Asian Games Unlimited class
(gold) - 1998 Asian Games Unlimited class

| Year | Venue | Weight | Snatch (kg) | | | | Clean & Jerk (kg) | | | | Total | Rank |
| Year | Venue | Weight | 1 | 2 | 3 | Rank | 1 | 2 | 3 | Rank | Total | Rank |
Summer Olympics
| 1992 | Barcelona, Spain | +110 kg | ~~180~~ | ~~180~~ | ~~180~~ | -- | -- | -- | -- | -- | -- | -- |
| 1996 | Atlanta, United States | +108 kg | ~~190~~ | 190 | ~~195~~ | 5 | 240 | 247.5 | ~~257.5~~ | 4 | 437.5 | 4 |
| 2000 | Sydney, Australia | +105 kg | ~~195~~ | 195 | 200 | 6 | 245 | 260 | ~~265~~ | 1 | 460 | 5 |
World Championships
| 1989 | Athens, Greece | 110 kg | 162.5 | ~~170~~ | ~~170~~ | 6 | ~~202.5~~ | 202.5 | ~~210~~ | 6 | 365 | 6 |
| 1991 | Donaueschingen, Germany | +110 kg | 175 | ~~180~~ | ~~180~~ | 4 | 220 | 225 | ~~235~~ | 3rd place, bronze medalist(s) | 400 | 3rd place, bronze medalist(s) |
| 1993 | Melbourne, Australia | +108 kg | ~~175~~ | ~~175~~ | 175 | 10 | ~~220~~ | 220 | 232.5 | 4 | 407.5 | 6 |
| 1995 | Guangzhou, China | +108 kg | 180 | ~~185~~ | ~~185~~ | 9 | 230 | ~~240~~ | ~~240~~ | 6 | 410 | 6 |
| 1999 | Athens, Greece | +105 kg | 190 | ~~200~~ | ~~200~~ | 10 | ~~250~~ | 250 | 252.5 | 2nd place, silver medalist(s) | 442.5 | 4 |
Asian Games
| 1990 | Beijing, China | 110 kg | | | | | | | | | | 1st place, gold medalist(s) |
| 1994 | Hiroshima, Japan | +108 kg | | | | | | | | | 415 | 1st place, gold medalist(s) |
| 1998 | Bangkok, Thailand | +105 kg | 195 | | | 1 | 232.5 | | | 1 | 427.5 | 1st place, gold medalist(s) |
