= Pak Dong-geun =

North Korean weightlifter (born 1944)

Personal information
- Nationality: North Korean
- Born: 27 November 1944 (age 81)
- Height: 160 cm (5 ft 3 in)
- Weight: 52 kg (115 lb)

Sport
- Sport: Weightlifting
- Weight class: 52 kg

Pak Dong-geun (born 27 November 1944) is a North Korean former weightlifter. He competed in the men's flyweight event at the 1972 Summer Olympics, where he set the then-Olympic record in the clean and jerk. He also was the world champion of the clean and jerk at the 1972 World Weightlifting Championships and later won a silver medal in the event at the 1974 Asian Games.

== Biography ==
Pak was born on 27 November 1944 and grew up in North Korea. He became a competitive weightlifter and measured at 160 centimetres (63 in) and 52 kilograms (115 lb) during his career, being classified as a flyweight. In 1972, Pak competed in weightlifting at the 1972 Summer Olympics in Munich, West Germany, which also acted as the 1972 World Weightlifting Championships. He finished in sixth place at the Olympics with a total of 317.5 kilograms (700 lb).

Pak notably had the best performance of all competitors in the clean and jerk, with a lift of 130 kilograms (290 lb), which set a new Olympic record. He thus also was the 1972 World Champion in the clean and jerk, being North Korea's first champion in the sport and among their first world champions in any sport. Two years later, he competed at the 1974 Asian Games in Tehran, Iran, and won the silver medal in the clean and jerk event in his weight class.
