= Talal Najjar =

Syrian weightlifter

Personal information
- Born: 5 February 1953 Homs, Syria
- Died: 22 February 2022 (aged 69) Homs, Syria

Sport
- Sport: Weightlifting
Medal record
Men's Weightlifting
Representing Syria
Asian Games
Gold medal – first place	1978 Bangkok	110 kg
Gold medal – first place	1982 New Delhi	+110 kg

Talal Najjar (Arabic: طلال نجار, 5 February 1953 – 22 February 2022) was a Syrian weightlifter. He competed in the men's super heavyweight event at the 1980 Summer Olympics, coming in last (8th) out of those competitors who finished.
