= North Korea at the Asian Games =

- IOC code: PRK
- NOC: Olympic Committee of the Democratic People's Republic of Korea
- Medals Ranked 8th: Gold 128 Silver 174 Bronze 197 Total 499

Summer appearances
- 1974; 1978; 1982; 1986; 1990; 1994; 1998; 2002; 2006; 2010; 2014; 2018; 2022; 2026

Winter appearances
- 1986; 1990; 1996–1999; 2003; 2007; 2011; 2017; 2025; 2029

North Korea first competed at the Asian Games in 1974.

== Asian Games ==
Source: https://info.hangzhou2022.cn/en/results/all-sports/noc-profile-dpr-korea.htm

=== Medals by Games ===
Games	Rank	Gold	Silver	Bronze	Total
1974 Tehran	5	15	14	17	46
1978 Bangkok	4	15	13	15	43
1982 New Delhi	4	17	19	20	56
1986 Seoul	Did not participate				
1990 Beijing	4	12	31	39	82
1994 Hiroshima	Did not participate				
1998 Bangkok	8	7	14	12	33
2002 Busan	9	9	11	13	33
2006 Doha	16	6	8	15	29
2010 Guangzhou	12	6	10	20	36
2014 Incheon	7	11	11	14	36
2018 Jakarta-Palembang	10	12	12	13	37
2022 Hangzhou	10	11	18	10	39
2026 Aichi-Nagoya	12	7	13	9	29
Total	8	128	174	197	499

=== Medals by sport ===
Sport	Rank	Gold	Silver	Bronze	Total
Archery	6	1	2	4	7
Athletics	18	6	6	11	23
Basketball	10	0	0	1	1
Boxing	9	8	10	11	29
Canoeing	7	0	3	6	9
Diving	8	0	8	15	23
Football	2	4	6	1	11
Gymnastics	4	19	24	28	71
Handball	8	0	1	0	1
Judo	5	4	9	18	31
Rowing	8	0	8	9	17
Shooting	4	41	41	30	112
Swimming	16	0	2	0	2
Soft tennis	5	0	1	1	2
Synchronized swimming	5	0	0	4	4
Table tennis	5	2	4	18	24
Weightlifting	2	35	31	22	88
Wrestling	9	8	18	16	42
Total	8	128	174	197	499

== Asian Para Games ==
- All-time Asian Para Games medal table 2 Bronze

== See also ==
- Doping at the Asian Games
