= Mohammad Nasehi =

Iranian weightlifter

Personal information
- Born: 4 March 1944 (age 82) Qom, Iran

Sport
- Sport: Weightlifting
Medal record
Representing Iran
Asian Games
Bronze medal – third place	1966 Bangkok	52 kg
Bronze medal – third place	1970 Bangkok	52 kg

Mohammad Nasehi Arjomand (Persian: محمد ناصحی ارجمند, born 4 March 1944) is an Iranian weightlifter. He won the bronze medal at the 1966 and 1970 Asian Games, He also participated at the 1972 Summer Olympics.
