= Pedro Landero =

Filipino weightlifter

Personal information
- Nationality: Filipino
- Born: 19 October 1913

Sport
- Sport: Weightlifting
- University team: FEU

Pedro Landero (born 19 October 1913, date of death unknown) was a Filipino weightlifter. He competed at the 1952 Summer Olympics and the 1956 Summer Olympics.

== Career ==
With the backing of FEU, Landero competed at the 1952 Summer Olympics. Competing in the bantamweight category, he placed 6th out of 19 weightlifters with 292.5 kilos. He returned for the 1956 Summer Olympics, but placed last among 16 weightlifters in what would be his final Olympic stint.
