= Kim Chul-hyun =

South Korean weightlifter (born 1959)

Personal information
- Nationality: South Korean
- Born: 25 June 1959 (age 66)

Sport
- Sport: Weightlifting

Kim Chul-hyun (born 25 June 1959) is a South Korean weightlifter. He competed in the men's middle heavyweight event at the 1984 Summer Olympics.
