= Ri Gwang-ju =

North Korean weightlifter (born 1953)

Personal information
- Nationality: North Korean
- Born: 8 February 1953 (age 72)

Sport
- Sport: Weightlifting

Ri Gwang-ju (born 8 February 1953) is a North Korean weightlifter. He competed in the men's lightweight event at the 1980 Summer Olympics.
