= Takeo Kimura (weightlifter) =

Japanese weightlifter (born 1943)

Personal information
- Nationality: Japanese
- Born: 25 October 1943 (age 81); Fukushima, Japan

Sport
- Sport: Weightlifting

Takeo Kimura (born 25 October 1943) is a Japanese weightlifter. He competed in the men's lightweight event at the 1968 Summer Olympics.
