= Nobutaka Tomatsu =

Japanese weightlifter (born 1962)

Personal information
- Nationality: Japanese
- Born: 8 January 1962 (age 63)

Sport
- Sport: Weightlifting

Nobutaka Tomatsu (born 8 January 1962) is a Japanese weightlifter. He competed in the men's heavyweight I event at the 1988 Summer Olympics.
