= Yeom Dong-chul =

South Korean weightlifter (born 1968)

Personal information
- Nationality: South Korean
- Born: 9 November 1968 (age 56)

Sport
- Sport: Weightlifting

Yeom Dong-chul (born 9 November 1968) is a South Korean weightlifter. He competed in the men's light heavyweight event at the 1992 Summer Olympics.
