= Yu In-ho =

South Korean weightlifter (born 1929)

Personal information
- Nationality: South Korean
- Born: 16 February 1929; Pyeonganbuk, Korea

Sport
- Sport: Weightlifting

Yu In-ho (born 16 February 1929) was a South Korean weightlifter. He competed at the 1956 Summer Olympics, the 1960 Summer Olympics and the 1964 Summer Olympics.
