= Hiroshi Ikehata =

Japanese weightlifter

Personal information
- Full name: Hiroshi Ikehata
- Born: 1 January 1970 (age 56) Satsumasendai, Kagoshima Prefecture, Japan
- Height: 160 cm (5 ft 3 in)
- Weight: 61.77 kg (136.2 lb)

Sport
- Country: Japan
- Sport: Weightlifting
- Weight class: 62 kg
- Club: Kagoshima CCI
- Updated on 28 September 2016

Hiroshi Ikehata (池畑 大, born 1 January 1970) is a Japanese male weightlifter, competing in the 62 kg category and representing Japan at international competitions. He participated at the 1996 Summer Olympics in the 59 kg event and at the 2000 Summer Olympics in the 62 kg event. He competed at world championships, most recently at the 1999 World Weightlifting Championships.

== Major results ==
Year	Venue	Weight	Snatch (kg)				Clean & Jerk (kg)				Total	Rank
Year	Venue	Weight	1	2	3	Rank	1	2	3	Rank	Total	Rank
Summer Olympics
2000	Sydney, Australia	62 kg				—N/a				—N/a		6
1996	Atlanta, United States	59 kg				—N/a				—N/a		4
World Championships
1999	Piraeus, Greece	62 kg	~~132.5~~	132.5	~~137.5~~	10	165	~~170~~	~~170~~	8	297.5	8
