= Om Jong-guk =

North Korean weightlifter (born 1943)

Personal information
- Nationality: North Korean
- Born: 25 November 1943 (age 81)

Sport
- Sport: Weightlifting

Om Jong-guk (born 25 November 1943) is a North Korean weightlifter. He competed in the men's featherweight event at the 1976 Summer Olympics.
