= Lee Hyung-woo =

South Korean weightlifter (born 1942)

Personal information
- Nationality: South Korean
- Born: 13 October 1942 (age 83)

Sport
- Sport: Weightlifting

Lee Hyung-woo (born 13 October 1942) is a South Korean weightlifter. He competed in the men's light heavyweight event at the 1964 Summer Olympics.
