= Atallah Mohammed =

Iraqi weightlifter (born 1960)

Personal information
- Full name: Atallah Mohammed Abdullah
- Nationality: Iraqi
- Born: 10 July 1960 (age 64)
- Weight: 88 kg (194 lb)

Sport
- Sport: Weightlifting

Atallah Mohammed Abdullah (Arabic: عطا الله محمد عبد الله; born 10 July 1960) is an Iraqi weightlifter. He competed in the 1992 Summer Olympics.
