= Gurunathan Muthuswamy =

Indian weightlifter (born 1963)

Personal information
- Nationality: Indian
- Born: 21 July 1963 (age 61)

Sport
- Sport: Weightlifting

Gurunathań Muthuswamy (born 21 July 1963) is an Indian weightlifter. He competed in the men's flyweight event at the 1988 Summer Olympics.
