= Tara Singh (weightlifter) =

Indian weightlifter (born 1955)

Personal information
- Full name: Tara Singh
- Nickname: Iron Man of India
- Nationality: Indian
- Born: 1 June 1955 (age 71) Phagwara, Punjab, India
- Education: Punjabi University, NIS Patiala, Punjab
- Height: 1.80 m (5 ft 11 in) (2015)
- Weight: 105 kg (231 lb) (2015)

Sport
- Country: India
- Sport: Weightlifting
- Event: 100 kg
- University team: Punjabi University
- Retired: 2015
- Now coaching: National Institute of Sports

Achievements and titles
- National finals: eight-time participant, six-time gold recipient, two-time silver recipient
Medal record
Men's weightlifting
Representing India
Men's Weight Lifting
Commonwealth Championship
| Gold medal – first place | 1985 Cardiff, Wales | Men's heavy weight |
| Silver medal – second place | 1981 Auckland, New Zealand | Men's heavy weight |
| Gold medal – first place | 1981 Auckland, New Zealand | Men's heavy weight |
Mini Commonwealth Games
| Gold medal – first place | 1981 Brisbane, Australia | Men's heavy weight |
New Zealand Summer Games
| Bronze medal – third place | 1981 Auckland, New Zealand | Men's heavy weight |
Asian Championship
| Bronze medal – third place | 1982 New Delhi, India | Men's heavy weight |
| Silver medal – second place | 1981 Nagoya, Japan | Men's heavy weight |
World Railway Games
| Bronze medal – third place | 1984 Sofia, Bulgaria | Men's heavy weight |
Pakistan National Games
| Silver medal – second place | 1984 Islambabad, Pakistan | Men's flyweight |
| Gold medal – first place | 1985 samoa | Men's heavy weight |

Tara Singh (born 1 June 1955) is an Indian weightlifter. He was the first Indian to cross 200 kg in the clean and jerk event winning the bronze medal while representing India at the 1982 Asian Games at New Delhi. He was conferred with the Arjuna Award in 1982 by the Government of India.
