= Chun Sang-suk =

South Korean weightlifter (born 1970)

Personal information
- Nationality: South Korean
- Born: 21 February 1970 (age 55)

Sport
- Sport: Weightlifting

Chun Sang-suk (born 21 February 1970) is a South Korean weightlifter. He competed at the 1992 Summer Olympics and the 1996 Summer Olympics.
