= Iraq at the Asian Games =

- IOC code: IRQ
- NOC: National Olympic Committee of Iraq
- Medals Ranked 31st: Gold 7 Silver 19 Bronze 29 Total 55

Summer appearances
- 1974; 1978; 1982; 1986; 1990–2002; 2006; 2010; 2014; 2018; 2022; 2026

Iraq first competed at the Asian Games in 1974.

== Medal tables ==
=== Medals by Asian Games ===
Peach colour indicates best performance

Games	Rank	Gold	Silver	Bronze	Total
(Iran) 1974 Tehran	15	1	0	5	6
(Thailand) 1978 Bangkok	10	2	4	6	12
(India) 1982 New Delhi	11	2	3	4	9
(South Korea) 1986 Seoul	15	0	5	2	7
(China) 1990 Beijing	Banned				
(Japan) 1994 Hiroshima	Banned				
(Thailand) 1998 Bangkok	Banned				
(South Korea) 2002 Busan	Banned				
(Qatar) 2006 Doha	29	0	2	1	3
(China) 2010 Guangzhou	32	0	1	2	3
(South Korea) 2014 Incheon	25	1	0	3	4
(Indonesia) 2018 Jakarta / Palembang	27	1	2	0	3
(China) 2022 Hangzhou	35	0	0	3	3
(Japan) 2026 Nagoya	30	0	2	3	5
(Qatar) 2030 Doha	Future event				
(Saudi Arabia) 2034 Riyadh	Future event				
Total	31	7	19	29	55
