= Ri Jae-son =

North Korean weightlifter (born 1968)

Personal information
- Nationality: North Korean
- Born: 21 November 1968 (age 56)

Sport
- Sport: Weightlifting

Ri Jae-son (born 21 November 1968) is a North Korean weightlifter. He competed in the men's featherweight event at the 1992 Summer Olympics.
