= Chun Byung-kook =

South Korean weightlifter (born 1964)

Personal information
- Nationality: South Korean
- Born: 23 July 1964 (age 61)

Sport
- Sport: Weightlifting

Chun Byung-kook (born 23 July 1964) is a South Korean weightlifter. He competed in the men's middle heavyweight event at the 1988 Summer Olympics.
