= Yosuke Muraki =

Japanese weightlifter (born 1960)

Personal information
- Nationality: Japanese
- Born: 19 January 1960 (age 65); Okayama, Japan

Sport
- Sport: Weightlifting

Yosuke Muraki (born 19 January 1960) is a Japanese weightlifter. He competed at the 1984 Summer Olympics, the 1988 Summer Olympics and the 1992 Summer Olympics.
