= Takeshi Horikoshi =

Japanese weightlifter (born 1943)

Personal information
- Nationality: Japanese
- Born: 18 May 1943 (age 82)

Sport
- Sport: Weightlifting

Takeshi Horikoshi (born 18 May 1943) is a Japanese weightlifter. He competed in the men's flyweight event at the 1976 Summer Olympics.
