= Lee Jong-sup (weightlifter) =

South Korean weightlifter (born 1935)

Personal information
- Nationality: South Korean
- Born: 30 October 1935 (age 90) Geoje, Korea

Sport
- Sport: Weightlifting

Lee Jong-sup (born 30 October 1935) is a South Korean weightlifter. He competed at the 1960 Summer Olympics, the 1964 Summer Olympics and the 1968 Summer Olympics.
