= Kim Ki-woong =

South Korean weightlifter (born 1961)

Personal information
- Nationality: South Korean
- Born: 20 November 1961 (age 63)

Sport
- Sport: Weightlifting

Kim Ki-woong (born 20 November 1961) is a South Korean weightlifter. He competed in the men's lightweight event at the 1988 Summer Olympics.
