= Masatomo Takeuchi =

Japanese weightlifter (born 1952)

Personal information
- Nationality: Japanese
- Born: 29 September 1952 (age 72)

Sport
- Sport: Weightlifting

Masatomo Takeuchi (born 29 September 1952) is a Japanese weightlifter. He competed in the men's flyweight event at the 1976 Summer Olympics.
