= Tetsuhide Sasaki =

Japanese weightlifter (1945–2019)

Personal information
- Nationality: Japanese
- Born: 6 June 1945
- Died: 7 April 2019 (aged 73)

Sport
- Sport: Weightlifting

Tetsuhide Sasaki (6 June 1945 – 7 April 2019) was a Japanese weightlifter. He competed in the men's flyweight event at the 1972 Summer Olympics.
