= Parviz Jalayer =

Iranian weightlifter (1939–2019)

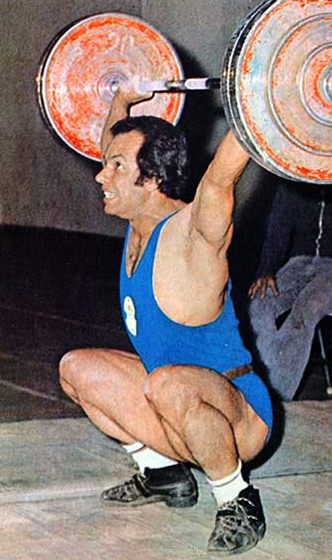

Personal information
- Born: 6 October 1939 Tehran, Iran
- Died: 6 July 2019 (aged 79)
- Height: 170 cm (5 ft 7 in)

Sport
- Sport: Weightlifting
- Coached by: Henrik Tamraz
Medal record
Representing Iran
Olympic Games
Silver medal – second place	1968 Mexico City	67.5 kg
World Championships
Bronze medal – third place	1966 East Berlin	67.5 kg
Asian Games
Gold medal – first place	1966 Bangkok	67.5 kg

Parviz Jalayer (Persian: پرویز جلایر, 6 October 1939 – 6 July 2019) was an Iranian weightlifter. He competed at the 1964 and 1968 Olympics and won a silver medal in 1968. In 1966 he won a gold medal at the Asian Games and a bronze at the World Championships. The following year he set a world record in the clean and jerk. After retiring from competitions he worked as a weightlifting coach.
