= Yasushige Sasaki =

Japanese weightlifter (born 1960)

Personal information
- Nationality: Japanese
- Born: 12 October 1960 (age 64)

Sport
- Sport: Weightlifting

Yasushige Sasaki (born 12 October 1960) is a Japanese weightlifter. He competed at the 1984 Summer Olympics and the 1988 Summer Olympics.
