= Chang Ming-chung =

Taiwanese weightlifter (born 1943)

Personal information
- Nationality: Taiwanese
- Born: 3 January 1943 (age 82); Tainan, Taiwan

Sport
- Sport: Weightlifting

Chang Ming-chung (Chinese: 張明忠; born 3 January 1943) is a Taiwanese weightlifter. He competed at the 1964 Summer Olympics and the 1968 Summer Olympics.
