= Prasert Sumpradit =

Thai weightlifter

Personal information
- Nationality: Thai
- Born: 22 November 1962 (age 62)

Sport
- Sport: Weightlifting

Prasert Sumpradit (born 22 November 1962) is a Thai weightlifter. He competed in the men's light heavyweight event at the 1992 Summer Olympics.
