= Pak Ui-myong =

North Korean weightlifter (born 1968)

Personal information
- Nationality: North Korean
- Born: 20 August 1968 (age 56)

Sport
- Sport: Weightlifting

Pak Ui-myong (born 20 August 1968) is a North Korean weightlifter. He competed in the men's middleweight event at the 1992 Summer Olympics.
