= He Zhuoqiang =

Chinese weightlifter (born 1967)

Medal record

Men's weightlifting

Representing China

Olympic Games
Bronze medal – third place	1988 Seoul	-52 kg

World Championships
Silver medal – second place	1987 Ostrava	-52 kg
Silver medal – second place	1989 Athens	-52 kg

Asian Games
Gold medal – first place	1986 Seoul	-52 kg
Gold medal – first place	1990 Beijing	-52 kg

He Zhuoqiang (Chinese: 何灼强; born 12 January 1967) is a male Chinese weightlifter. He competed at 1988 Seoul Olympics, and won a bronze medal in men's 52 kg.
