= Chung Dae-jin =

South Korean weightlifter (born 1972)

Personal information
- Nationality: South Korean
- Born: 26 June 1972 (age 52)

Sport
- Sport: Weightlifting

Chung Dae-jin (born 26 June 1972) is a South Korean weightlifter. He competed in the men's heavyweight I event at the 1992 Summer Olympics.
