= Sueo Fujishiro =

Japanese weightlifter (born 1949)

Personal information
- Nationality: Japanese
- Born: 11 April 1949 (age 76)

Sport
- Sport: Weightlifting

Sueo Fujishiro (born 11 April 1949) is a Japanese weightlifter. He competed in the men's light heavyweight event at the 1976 Summer Olympics.
