= Aung Gyi (weightlifter) =

Burmese weightlifter (born 1945)

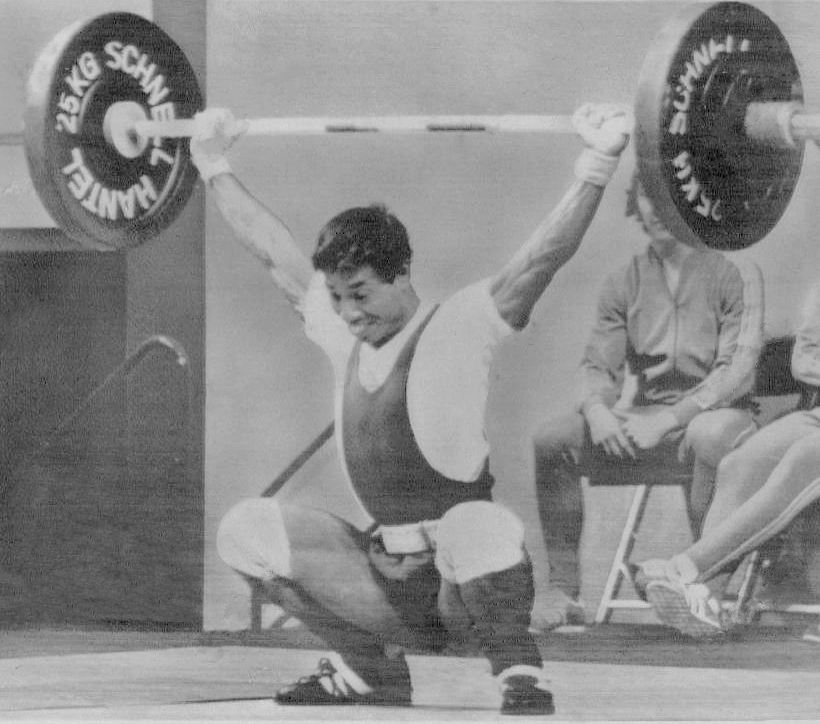
- Gyi at the 1972 Olympics

Personal information
- Full name: Aung Maung Gyi
- Born: 15 December 1945 (age 80)

Sport
- Sport: Weightlifting
- Weight class: 52 kg
- Team: National team
Medal record
Representing Burma
World Championships
| Gold medal – first place | 1972 Munich | -52 kg (snatch) |
Asian Games
| Silver medal – second place | 1974 Tehran | -52 kg (total) |
- Updated on 13 November 2016

Aung Maung Gyi (born 15 December 1945) is a retired Burmese weightlifter. He won a silver medal at the 1974 Asian Games and set two world record in the snatch, in 1970 and 1972. At the 1972 Summer Olympics he placed fifth.
