= Nobuyuki Hatta =

Japanese weightlifter (born 1944)

Personal information
- Nationality: Japanese
- Born: 6 November 1944 (age 80); Hokkaido, Japan

Sport
- Sport: Weightlifting

Nobuyuki Hatta (Japanese: 八田 信之, born 6 November 1944) is a Japanese weightlifter. He competed in the men's lightweight event at the 1968 Summer Olympics.
