= Saleh Mohammed (weightlifter) =

Iraqi weightlifter (born 1963)

Saleh Mohammed Kadhim
Personal information
- Nationality: Iraqi
- Born: 22 June 1963 (age 62)

Sport
- Sport: Weightlifting

Saleh Mohammed Kadhim (Arabic: صالح محمد كاظم, born 22 June 1963) is an Iraqi weightlifter. He competed in the men's light heavyweight event at the 1992 Summer Olympics.
