= Toshiyuki Notomi =

Japanese weightlifter (born 1971)

Personal information
- Nationality: Japanese
- Born: 15 June 1971 (age 54); Kobe, Japan

Sport
- Sport: Weightlifting

Toshiyuki Notomi (納富 俊行, Nōtomi Toshiyuki; born 15 June 1971) is a Japanese weightlifter. He competed in the men's flyweight event at the 1996 Summer Olympics.
