= Hideo Mizuno =

Japanese weightlifter (born 1970)

Personal information
- Nationality: Japanese
- Born: 22 June 1970 (age 55); Tokyo, Japan

Sport
- Sport: Weightlifting

Hideo Mizuno (水野 英郎, Mizuno Hideo; born 22 June 1970) is a Japanese weightlifter. He competed in the men's middleweight event at the 1992 Summer Olympics.
