= Yun Sook-woon =

South Korean weightlifter (born 1934)

Personal information
- Nationality: South Korean
- Born: 10 January 1934 (age 92) Boyo, Korea

Sport
- Sport: Weightlifting

Yun Sook-woon (born 10 January 1934) is a South Korean weightlifter. He competed in the men's middle heavyweight event at the 1968 Summer Olympics.
