= Ryoji Isaoka =

Japanese weightlifter (born 1962)

Personal information
- Born: February 18, 1962 (age 64) Ohira, Tochigi, Japan
- Height: 1.71 m (5 ft 7 in)
- Weight: 85 kg (187 lb)

Sport
- Sport: Weightlifting
Medal record
Representing Japan
Olympic Games
Bronze medal – third place	1984 Los Angeles	Light-heavyweight; 150+190 kg
World Championships
Bronze medal – third place	1984 Los Angeles	Light-heavyweight; 150+190 kg
Asian Games
Gold medal – first place	1982 New Delhi	Light-heavyweight
Gold medal – first place	1986 Seoul	Light-heavyweight
Bronze medal – third place	1990 Beijing	Light-heavyweight

Ryoji Isaoka (砂岡 良治, Isaoka Ryōji; born February 18, 1962) is a retired Japanese weightlifter who competed in the light-heavyweight category. He won a bronze medal at the 1984 Summer Olympics, which was combined with the world championships, and finished sixth at the 1988 Olympics. He also won two gold medals and one bronze medal at the 1982–1990 Asian Games.
