= Kazumasa Hirai (weightlifter) =

Japanese weightlifter (born 1949)

Personal information
- Born: November 21, 1949 (age 76)
- Height: 1.56 m (5 ft 1 1/2 in)
- Weight: 60 kg (130 lb)

Sport
- Country: Japan
- Sport: Weightlifting
Medal record
Olympic Games
Bronze medal – third place	1976 Montreal	Featherweight

Kazumasa Hirai (平井 一正, Hirai Kazumasa) (born November 21, 1949) is a Japanese weightlifter and Olympic medalist. He won a bronze medal at the 1976 Summer Olympics in Montreal, Quebec, Canada.
