= Lee Myung-su =

South Korean weightlifter (born 1957)

Personal information
- Nationality: South Korean
- Born: 10 July 1957 (age 67)

Sport
- Sport: Weightlifting

Lee Myung-su (born 10 July 1957) is a South Korean weightlifter. He competed in the men's featherweight event at the 1984 Summer Olympics.
