= Chun Byung-kwan =

South Korean weightlifter (born 1969)

- Hangul: 전병관
- Hanja: 全炳寬
- RR: Jeon Byeonggwan
- MR: Chŏn Pyŏnggwan

Chun Byung-kwan
Medal record

Men's weightlifting

Representing South Korea

Olympic Games
Gold medal – first place	1992 Barcelona	–56 kg
Silver medal – second place	1988 Seoul	–52 kg

World Championships
Gold medal – first place	1991 Donaueschingen	–56 kg
Silver medal – second place	1995 Guangzhou	–59 kg
Bronze medal – third place	1990 Budapest	–56 kg

Chun Byung-kwan (Korean: 전병관; born November 4, 1969, in Jinan, Jeollabuk-do) is an Olympic weightlifter who represented South Korea.
