= Hwang Woo-won =

South Korean weightlifter (born 1962)

Personal information
- Nationality: South Korean
- Born: 16 May 1962 (age 63)

Sport
- Sport: Weightlifting

Hwang Woo-won (born 16 May 1962) is a South Korean weightlifter. He competed in the men's 90 kg middle-heavyweight event at the 1984 Summer Olympics - placing 5th. He also completed in the 1988 Summer Olympics, placing 7th in the men's 100 kg heavyweight event.
