= Han Gyong-si =

North Korean weightlifter (born 1954)

Personal information
- Native name: 한경시
- Nationality: North Korean
- Born: 18 May 1954 (age 71)

Sport
- Sport: Weightlifting

Han Gyong-si (born 18 May 1954) is a North Korean weightlifter. He competed at the 1976 Summer Olympics and the 1980 Summer Olympics. At the 1980 Summer Olympics, he won the bronze medal in the flyweight event.
