= Kenkichi Ando =

Japanese weightlifter (born 1950)

Medal record

Men's weightlifting

Representing Japan

Olympic Games
Bronze medal – third place	1976 Montreal	-56 kg

World Championships
Silver medal – second place	1971 Lima	-60 kg
Bronze medal – third place	1978 Gettysburg	-56 kg

Kenkichi Ando (安藤 謙吉, Andō Kenkichi; born May 3, 1950 in Gifu) is a Japanese weightlifter and Olympic medalist. He received a bronze medal at the 1976 Summer Olympics in Montreal, Quebec, Canada.
