= Liao Hsing-chou =

Taiwanese weightlifter (born 1970)

Personal information
- Native name: 廖星州
- Nationality: Taiwanese
- Born: 4 February 1970 (age 55)

Sport
- Sport: Weightlifting

Liao Hsing-chou (Chinese: 廖星州; born 4 February 1970) is a Taiwanese weightlifter. He competed at the 1988 Summer Olympics and the 1996 Summer Olympics.

== Biography ==
Liao's father is Liao Yong-yuan (Chinese: 廖永元), the owner of a martial arts gym in the Bade District of Taoyuan. The younger Liao competed at the 1988 Summer Olympics in Seoul when he was 18 years old. He later competed at the 1996 Summer Olympics in Atlanta, Georgia. Liao was employed at First Commercial Bank and resigned to focus on his graduate studies at National Taiwan Sport University. Liao competed at the 2000 Asian Weightlifting Championships in Osaka, where he set three national records though did not medal in any of the events.

Liao set a national record of lifting 134 kilograms (295 lb) in the 69kg category on 15 March 2005 at the National Sports Training Center. His record was broken by Wu Zong-ling (Chinese: 吳宗嶺) in 2006. Liao represented Taoyuan during a 69kg weightlifting competition at the National Games of Taiwan in 2005. He tore his arm ligament during one of his attempts. He continued competing and in a subsequent attempt he fell to the ground, was unable to get up, and was carried out on a stretcher. Liao received a silver medal in the competition, having lifted a total of 273 kilograms (602 lb). Despite having largely become a coach before the competition, he participated in the National Games to earn prize money and for the honor. He had been competing against much younger athletes. Liao said, "Time does not spare anyone; I have to admit defeat. It's time to fully retire. Not being an athlete doesn't mean I won’t continue as a coach."

After retiring from weightlifting, Liao became a wrestling coach at a Taipei high school. Liao is married to Zhu Nan-mei (Chinese: 朱南美), a former world champion weightlifter. The newspaper Min Sheng Bao reported in 2004 that the couple had one daughter and that Zhu was pregnant with their second child.
