= Zhang Shoulie =

Chinese weightlifter (born 1966)

Personal information
- Born: 20 August 1966 (age 59)
- Height: 148 cm (4 ft 10 in)
- Weight: 52 kg (115 lb)

Sport
- Country: China
- Sport: Weightlifting
- Weight class: 52 kg
- Team: National team
Medal record
Men's Weightlifting
Representing China
World Championships
Bronze medal – third place	1991	52 kg (clean & jerk)
- Updated on 16 November 2016

Zhang Shoulie (張 壽烈, born 20 August 1966) is a Chinese male former weightlifter, who competed in the 52 kg category and represented China at international competitions. He won the bronze medal in the clean & jerk at the 1991 World Weightlifting Championships lifting 142.5 kg. He participated at the 1988 Summer Olympics in the 52 kg event.
