= Cai Yanshu =

Chinese weightlifter (born 1964)

Personal information
- Nationality: Chinese
- Born: 15 July 1964 (age 60)

Sport
- Sport: Weightlifting

Cai Yanshu (born 15 July 1964) is a Chinese weightlifter. He competed at the 1988 Summer Olympics and the 1992 Summer Olympics.
