= Yang Eui-yong =

North Korean weightlifter (born 1951)

Personal information
- Native name: 양의영
- Nationality: North Korean
- Born: 20 October 1951 (age 73)

Sport
- Sport: Weightlifting

Yang Eui-yong (Korean: 양의영; born 20 October 1951) is a North Korean weightlifter. He competed in the men's bantamweight event at the 1980 Summer Olympics.

Yang was the champion of the 1978 Asian Games in his weight class.
