= Li Shunzhu =

Chinese weightlifter (born 1958)

Personal information
- Nationality: Chinese
- Born: 30 March 1958 (age 67)

Sport
- Sport: Weightlifting

Li Shunzhu (born 30 March 1958) is a Chinese weightlifter. He competed in the men's middleweight event at the 1984 Summer Olympics.
