= He Yingqiang =

Chinese weightlifter (born 1965)

Medal record

Men's Weightlifting

Olympic Games
| Silver medal – second place | 1988 Seoul | 52-56 kg |
| Bronze medal – third place | 1992 Barcelona | 56-60 kg |

He Yingqiang (Chinese: 何英强; born 25 May 1965) is a male Chinese weightlifter. He competed at 1988 Seoul Olympics and won a silver medal in Men's 52–56 kg. 4 years later, He won a bronze medal at 1992 Barcelona Olympics in Men's 56–60 kg.
