= Lee Chun-sik =

South Korean weightlifter (born 1944)

Personal information
- Nationality: South Korean
- Born: 27 November 1944 (age 80); Daejeon, Korea

Sport
- Sport: Weightlifting

Lee Chun-sik (born 27 November 1944) is a South Korean weightlifter. He competed in the men's middleweight event at the 1968 Summer Olympics.
