= Yao Jingyuan =

Chinese weightlifter (born 1958)

Medal record

Representing China

Weightlifting

Summer Olympics
Gold medal – first place	1984 Los Angeles	-67.5 kg

Yao Jingyuan (Chinese: 姚景远; born 14 June 1958 in Yingkou, Liaoning) is a male Chinese weightlifter. He won a gold medal at 1984 Olympic Games in men's 67.5 kg.
