= 1976 European Weightlifting Championships =

International weightlifting competition

1976 European Championships

The 1976 European Weightlifting Championships were held at the Werner-Seelenbinder-Halle in Berlin, East Germany from April 3 to April 11, 1976. This was the 55th edition of the event. There were 151 men in action from 21 nations.

== Medal summary ==
Event	Gold		Silver		Bronze	
52 kg
Snatch	Aleksandr Voronin; Soviet Union	107.5 kg	György Kőszegi; Hungary	102.5 kg	Zygmunt Smalcerz; Poland	100.0 kg
Clean & Jerk	György Kőszegi; Hungary	132.5 kg	Aleksandr Voronin; Soviet Union	132.5 kg	Lajos Szűcs; Hungary	130.0 kg
Total	Aleksandr Voronin; Soviet Union	240.0 kg	György Kőszegi; Hungary	235.0 kg	Lajos Szűcs; Hungary	230.0 kg
56 kg
Snatch	Karel Prohl; Czechoslovakia	112.5 kg	Norair Nurikyan; Bulgaria	110.0 kg	Imre Stefanovics; Hungary	107.5 kg
Clean & Jerk	Norair Nurikyan; Bulgaria	145.0 kg	Leszek Skorupa; Poland	145.0 kg	Imre Stefanovics; Hungary	142.5 kg
Total	Norair Nurikyan; Bulgaria	255.0 kg	Leszek Skorupa; Poland	252.5 kg	Karel Prohl; Czechoslovakia	250.0 kg
60 kg
Snatch	Todor Todorov; Bulgaria	125.0 kg	Georgi Todorov; Bulgaria	125.0 kg	Nikolay Kolesnikov; Soviet Union	122.5 kg
Clean & Jerk	Nikolay Kolesnikov; Soviet Union	160.0 kg	Todor Todorov; Bulgaria	155.0 kg	Grzegorz Cziura; Poland	155.0 kg
Total	Nikolay Kolesnikov; Soviet Union	282.5 kg	Todor Todorov; Bulgaria	280.0 kg	Georgi Todorov; Bulgaria	277.5 kg
67.5 kg
Snatch	Zbigniew Kaczmarek; Poland	135.0 kg	Zahari Todorov; Bulgaria	132.5 kg	Jan Lostowski; Poland	132.5 kg
Clean & Jerk	Sergey Pevsner; Soviet Union	172.5 kg	Jan Lostowski; Poland	170.0 kg	Zbigniew Kaczmarek; Poland	170.0 kg
Total	Zbigniew Kaczmarek; Poland	305.0 kg	Jan Lostowski; Poland	302.5 kg	Sergey Pevsner; Soviet Union	297.5 kg
75 kg
Snatch	Peter Wenzel; East Germany	150.0 kg	Vardan Militosyan; Soviet Union	150.0 kg	Yordan Mitkov; Bulgaria	147.5 kg
Clean & Jerk	Vardan Militosyan; Soviet Union	190.0 kg	Peter Wenzel; East Germany	185.0 kg	Yordan Mitkov; Bulgaria	182.5 kg
Total	Vardan Militosyan; Soviet Union	340.0 kg	Peter Wenzel; East Germany	335.0 kg	Yordan Mitkov; Bulgaria	330.0 kg
82.5 kg
Snatch	Trendafil Stoychev; Bulgaria	167.5 kg	Valery Shary; Soviet Union	165.0 kg	Blagoy Blagoev; Bulgaria	165.0 kg
Clean & Jerk	Rolf Milser; West Germany	207.5 kg	Valery Shary; Soviet Union	202.5 kg	Blagoy Blagoev; Bulgaria	200.0 kg
Total	Valery Shary; Soviet Union	367.5 kg	Blagoy Blagoev; Bulgaria	365.0 kg	Trendafil Stoychev; Bulgaria	365.0 kg
90 kg
Snatch	David Rigert; Soviet Union	177.5 kg	Adam Saydullaev; Soviet Union	160.0 kg	Michel Broillet; Switzerland	160.0 kg
Clean & Jerk	David Rigert; Soviet Union	220.0 kg	Adam Saydullaev; Soviet Union	200.0 kg	Christos Iakovou; Greece	195.0 kg
Total	David Rigert; Soviet Union	397.5 kg	Adam Saydullaev; Soviet Union	360.0 kg	Peter Petzold; East Germany	350.0 kg
110 kg
Snatch	Valentin Hristov; Bulgaria	185.0 kg	Yury Zaitsev; Soviet Union	172.5 kg	Jürgen Ciezki; East Germany	170.0 kg
Clean & Jerk	Valentin Hristov; Bulgaria	230.0 kg	Yury Zaitsev; Soviet Union	227.5 kg	Jürgen Ciezki; East Germany	225.0 kg
Total	Valentin Hristov; Bulgaria	415.0 kg	Yury Zaitsev; Soviet Union	400.0 kg	Jürgen Ciezki; East Germany	395.0 kg
+110 kg
Snatch	Hristo Plachkov; Bulgaria	195.0 kg	Jürgen Heuser; East Germany	180.0 kg	Gerd Bonk; East Germany	180.0 kg
Clean & Jerk	Gerd Bonk; East Germany	252.5 kg	Hristo Plachkov; Bulgaria	235.0 kg	Jürgen Heuser; East Germany	230.0 kg
Total	Gerd Bonk; East Germany	432.5 kg	Hristo Plachkov; Bulgaria	430.0 kg	Jürgen Heuser; East Germany	410.0 kg

== Medal table ==
Ranking by Big (Total result) medals

Rank	Nation	Gold	Silver	Bronze	Total
1	Soviet Union (URS)	5	2	1	8
2	Bulgaria (BUL)	2	3	3	8
3	Poland (POL)	1	2	0	3
4	East Germany (GDR)	1	1	3	5
5	Hungary (HUN)	0	1	1	2
6	Czechoslovakia (TCH)	0	0	1	1
Totals (6 entries)		9	9	9	27
