= 1976 World Weightlifting Championships =

International weightlifting competition

1976 Men's World Championships
- Host city: Montreal, Quebec, Canada
- Dates: 18–27 July 1976

The 1976 Men's World Weightlifting Championships were held in Montreal, Quebec, Canada from July 18 to July 27, 1976. There were 173 men in action from 46 nations.

This tournament was a part of 1976 Summer Olympics but counted as World Weightlifting Championships too. Only total medals counted for Olympic Games while Snatch and Clean & Jerk medals counts for World Weightlifting Championships.

== Medal summary ==
Event	Gold		Silver		Bronze	
52 kg
Snatch	György Kőszegi; Hungary	107.5 kg	Masatomo Takeuchi; Japan	105.0 kg	Aleksandr Voronin; Soviet Union	105.0 kg
Clean & Jerk	Aleksandr Voronin; Soviet Union	137.5 kg	Mohammad Nassiri; Iran	135.0 kg	György Kőszegi; Hungary	130.0 kg
Total	Aleksandr Voronin; Soviet Union	242.5 kg	György Kőszegi; Hungary	237.5 kg	Mohammad Nassiri; Iran	235.0 kg
56 kg
Snatch	Norair Nurikyan; Bulgaria	117.5 kg	Grzegorz Cziura; Poland	115.0 kg	Leszek Skorupa; Poland	112.5 kg
Clean & Jerk	Norair Nurikyan; Bulgaria	145.0 kg	Kenkichi Ando; Japan	142.5 kg	Imre Földi; Hungary	140.0 kg
Total	Norair Nurikyan; Bulgaria	262.5 kg WR	Grzegorz Cziura; Poland	252.5 kg	Kenkichi Ando; Japan	250.0 kg
60 kg
Snatch	Nikolay Kolesnikov; Soviet Union	125.0 kg	Kazumasa Hirai; Japan	125.0 kg	Georgi Todorov; Bulgaria	122.5 kg
Clean & Jerk	Nikolay Kolesnikov; Soviet Union	160.0 kg	Georgi Todorov; Bulgaria	157.5 kg	Takashi Saito; Japan	152.5 kg
Total	Nikolay Kolesnikov; Soviet Union	285.0 kg	Georgi Todorov; Bulgaria	280.0 kg	Kazumasa Hirai; Japan	275.0 kg
67.5 kg
Snatch	Petro Korol; Soviet Union	135.0 kg	Daniel Senet; France	135.0 kg	Kazimierz Czarnecki; Poland	130.0 kg
Clean & Jerk	Petro Korol; Soviet Union	170.0 kg	Günter Ambraß; East Germany	170.0 kg	Yatsuo Shimaya; Japan	165.0 kg
Total	Petro Korol; Soviet Union	305.0 kg	Daniel Senet; France	300.0 kg	Kazimierz Czarnecki; Poland	295.0 kg
75 kg
Snatch	Yordan Mitkov; Bulgaria	145.0 kg	Peter Wenzel; East Germany	145.0 kg	Vardan Militosyan; Soviet Union	145.0 kg
Clean & Jerk	Yordan Mitkov; Bulgaria	190.0 kg	Vardan Militosyan; Soviet Union	185.0 kg	Peter Wenzel; East Germany	182.5 kg
Total	Yordan Mitkov; Bulgaria	335.0 kg	Vardan Militosyan; Soviet Union	330.0 kg	Peter Wenzel; East Germany	327.5 kg
82.5 kg
Snatch	Valery Shary; Soviet Union	162.5 kg	Trendafil Stoychev; Bulgaria	162.5 kg	Péter Baczakó; Hungary	157.5 kg
Clean & Jerk	Rolf Milser; West Germany	205.0 kg	Valery Shary; Soviet Union	202.5 kg	Trendafil Stoychev; Bulgaria	197.5 kg
Total	Valery Shary; Soviet Union	365.0 kg	Trendafil Stoychev; Bulgaria	360.0 kg	Péter Baczakó; Hungary	345.0 kg
90 kg
Snatch	David Rigert; Soviet Union	170.0 kg	Lee James; United States	165.0 kg	Michel Broillet; Switzerland	165.0 kg
Clean & Jerk	David Rigert; Soviet Union	212.5 kg	Atanas Shopov; Bulgaria	205.0 kg	Lee James; United States	197.5 kg
Total	David Rigert; Soviet Union	382.5 kg	Lee James; United States	362.5 kg	Atanas Shopov; Bulgaria	360.0 kg
110 kg
Snatch	Krastyu Semerdzhiev; Bulgaria	170.0 kg	Tadeusz Rutkowski; Poland	167.5 kg	Russ Prior; Canada	167.5 kg
Clean & Jerk	Yury Zaitsev; Soviet Union	220.0 kg	Pierre Gourrier; France	215.0 kg	Krastyu Semerdzhiev; Bulgaria	215.0 kg
Total	Yury Zaitsev; Soviet Union	385.0 kg	Krastyu Semerdzhiev; Bulgaria	385.0 kg	Tadeusz Rutkowski; Poland	377.5 kg
+110 kg
Snatch	Vasily Alekseyev; Soviet Union	185.0 kg	Bruce Wilhelm; United States	172.5 kg	Gerd Bonk; East Germany	170.0 kg
Clean & Jerk	Vasily Alekseyev; Soviet Union	255.0 kg WR	Gerd Bonk; East Germany	235.0 kg	Ján Nagy; Czechoslovakia	227.5 kg
Total	Vasily Alekseyev; Soviet Union	440.0 kg	Gerd Bonk; East Germany	405.0 kg	Helmut Losch; East Germany	387.5 kg

== Medal table ==
Ranking by Big (Total result) medals

Rank	Nation	Gold	Silver	Bronze	Total
1	Soviet Union	7	1	0	8
2	Bulgaria	2	3	1	6
3	East Germany	0	1	2	3
3	Poland	0	1	2	3
5	Hungary	0	1	1	2
6	France	0	1	0	1
6	United States	0	1	0	1
8	Japan	0	0	2	2
9	Iran	0	0	1	1
Totals (9 entries)		9	9	9	27

Ranking by all medals: Big (Total result) and Small (Snatch and Clean & Jerk)

Rank	Nation	Gold	Silver	Bronze	Total
1	Soviet Union	18	3	2	23
2	Bulgaria	7	6	4	17
3	Hungary	1	1	4	6
4	West Germany	1	0	0	1
5	East Germany	0	4	4	8
6	Japan	0	3	4	7
6	Poland	0	3	4	7
8	United States	0	3	1	4
9	France	0	3	0	3
10	Iran	0	1	1	2
11	Canada	0	0	1	1
11	Czechoslovakia	0	0	1	1
11	Switzerland	0	0	1	1
Totals (13 entries)		27	27	27	81

== See also ==
- Weightlifting at the 1976 Summer Olympics
