= 1974 European Weightlifting Championships =

International weightlifting competition

1974 European Championships

The 1974 European Weightlifting Championships were held in Verona, Italy from May 27 to June 6, 1974. This was the 53rd edition of the event. There were 162 men in action from 26 nations.

== Medal summary ==
| Event | Gold | | Silver | | Bronze | |
52 kg
| Snatch | Mustafa Mustafov; Bulgaria | 100.0 kg | György Kőszegi; Hungary | 97.5 kg | Zygmunt Smalcerz; Poland | 97.5 kg |
| Clean & Jerk | Zygmunt Smalcerz; Poland | 132.5 kg | Lajos Szűcs; Hungary | 130.0 kg | Mustafa Mustafov; Bulgaria | 127.5 kg |
| Total | Zygmunt Smalcerz; Poland | 230.0 kg | Lajos Szűcs; Hungary | 227.5 kg | Mustafa Mustafov; Bulgaria | 227.5 kg |
56 kg
| Snatch | Vladimir Anikin; Soviet Union | 110.0 kg | Atanas Kirov; Bulgaria | 110.0 kg | Włodzimierz Jakub; Poland | 107.5 kg |
| Clean & Jerk | Atanas Kirov; Bulgaria | 147.5 kg | Karel Prohl; Czechoslovakia | 140.0 kg | Vladimir Anikin; Soviet Union | 137.5 kg |
| Total | Atanas Kirov; Bulgaria | 257.5 kg | Vladimir Anikin; Soviet Union | 247.5 kg | Karel Prohl; Czechoslovakia | 245.0 kg |
60 kg
| Snatch | Georgi Todorov; Bulgaria | 120.0 kg | János Benedek; Hungary | 120.0 kg | Dito Shanidze; Soviet Union | 120.0 kg |
| Clean & Jerk | Georgi Todorov; Bulgaria | 152.5 kg | Dito Shanidze; Soviet Union | 152.5 kg | Norair Nurikyan; Bulgaria | 150.0 kg |
| Total | Georgi Todorov; Bulgaria | 272.5 kg | Dito Shanidze; Soviet Union | 272.5 kg | Norair Nurikyan; Bulgaria | 265.0 kg |
67.5 kg
| Snatch | Zbigniew Kaczmarek; Poland | 132.5 kg | Mukharby Kirzhinov; Soviet Union | 127.5 kg | Walter Legel; Austria | 125.0 kg |
| Clean & Jerk | Mukharby Kirzhinov; Soviet Union | 172.5 kg | Zbigniew Kaczmarek; Poland | 165.0 kg | Henryk Rum; Poland | 160.0 kg |
| Total | Mukharby Kirzhinov; Soviet Union | 300.0 kg | Zbigniew Kaczmarek; Poland | 297.5 kg | Walter Legel; Austria | 280.0 kg |
75 kg
| Snatch | Nedelcho Kolev; Bulgaria | 152.5 kg | Peter Wenzel; East Germany | 145.0 kg | András Stark; Hungary | 142.5 kg |
| Clean & Jerk | Nedelcho Kolev; Bulgaria | 187.5 kg | Viktor Kurentsov; Soviet Union | 185.0 kg | Peter Wenzel; East Germany | 182.5 kg |
| Total | Nedelcho Kolev; Bulgaria | 340.0 kg | Peter Wenzel; East Germany | 327.5 kg | Viktor Kurentsov; Soviet Union | 325.0 kg |
82.5 kg
| Snatch | Vladimir Ryzhenkov; Soviet Union | 160.0 kg | Rumen Rusev; Bulgaria | 157.5 kg | Trendafil Stoychev; Bulgaria | 152.5 kg |
| Clean & Jerk | Vladimir Ryzhenkov; Soviet Union | 197.5 kg | Trendafil Stoychev; Bulgaria | 195.0 kg | Rumen Rusev; Bulgaria | 187.5 kg |
| Total | Vladimir Ryzhenkov; Soviet Union | 357.5 kg | Trendafil Stoychev; Bulgaria | 347.5 kg | Rumen Rusev; Bulgaria | 345.0 kg |
90 kg
| Snatch | Andon Nikolov; Bulgaria | 175.0 kg | David Rigert; Soviet Union | 172.5 kg | Sergey Poltoratsky; Soviet Union | 162.5 kg |
| Clean & Jerk | David Rigert; Soviet Union | 212.5 kg | Andon Nikolov; Bulgaria | 210.0 kg | Peter Petzold; East Germany | 200.0 kg |
| Total | David Rigert; Soviet Union | 385.0 kg | Andon Nikolov; Bulgaria | 385.0 kg | Sergey Poltoratsky; Soviet Union | 362.5 kg |
110 kg
| Snatch | Valentin Hristov; Bulgaria | 167.5 kg | Jürgen Ciezki; East Germany | 165.0 kg | Valery Ustyuzhin; Soviet Union | 162.5 kg |
| Clean & Jerk | Valery Ustyuzhin; Soviet Union | 227.5 kg | Valentin Hristov; Bulgaria | 220.0 kg | Jürgen Ciezki; East Germany | 205.0 kg |
| Total | Valery Ustyuzhin; Soviet Union | 390.0 kg | Valentin Hristov; Bulgaria | 387.5 kg | Jürgen Ciezki; East Germany | 370.0 kg |
+110 kg
| Snatch | Vasily Alekseyev; Soviet Union | 187.5 kg | Serge Reding; Belgium | 175.0 kg | Gerd Bonk; East Germany | 167.5 kg |
| Clean & Jerk | Gerd Bonk; East Germany | 235.0 kg | Vasily Alekseyev; Soviet Union | 235.0 kg | Serge Reding; Belgium | 225.0 kg |
| Total | Vasily Alekseyev; Soviet Union | 422.5 kg | Gerd Bonk; East Germany | 402.5 kg | Serge Reding; Belgium | 400.0 kg |

== Medal table ==
Ranking by Big (Total result) medals

| Rank | Nation | Gold | Silver | Bronze | Total |
|---|---|---|---|---|---|
| 1 | Soviet Union | 5 | 2 | 2 | 9 |
| 2 | Bulgaria | 3 | 3 | 3 | 9 |
| 3 | Poland | 1 | 1 | 0 | 2 |
| 4 | East Germany | 0 | 2 | 1 | 3 |
| 5 | Hungary | 0 | 1 | 0 | 1 |
| 6 | Austria | 0 | 0 | 1 | 1 |
| 6 | Belgium | 0 | 0 | 1 | 1 |
| 6 | Czechoslovakia | 0 | 0 | 1 | 1 |
| Totals (8 entries) | | 9 | 9 | 9 | 27 |
