= 1979 European Weightlifting Championships =

International weightlifting competition

1979 European Championships

The 1979 European Weightlifting Championships were held in Varna, Bulgaria from May 19 to May 27, 1979. This was the 58th edition of the event. There were 140 men in action from 24 nations.

== Medal summary ==
Event	Gold		Silver		Bronze	
52 kg
Snatch	Aleksandr Voronin; Soviet Union	110.0 kg	Stefan Leletko; Poland	102.5 kg	Tadeusz Golik; Poland	100.0 kg
Clean & Jerk	Aleksandr Voronin; Soviet Union	135.0 kg	Béla Oláh; Hungary	132.5 kg	Stefan Leletko; Poland	130.0 kg
Total	Aleksandr Voronin; Soviet Union	245.0 kg	Stefan Leletko; Poland	232.5 kg	Béla Oláh; Hungary	232.5 kg
56 kg
Snatch	Tadeusz Dembończyk; Poland	115.0 kg	Anton Kodzhabashev; Bulgaria	115.0 kg	Leszek Skorupa; Poland	110.0 kg
Clean & Jerk	Anton Kodzhabashev; Bulgaria	147.5 kg	Tadeusz Dembończyk; Poland	145.0 kg	Imre Stefanovics; Hungary	142.5 kg
Total	Anton Kodzhabashev; Bulgaria	262.5 kg	Tadeusz Dembończyk; Poland	260.0 kg	Imre Stefanovics; Hungary	252.5 kg
60 kg
Snatch	Nikolay Kolesnikov; Soviet Union	127.5 kg	Georgi Todorov; Bulgaria	125.0 kg	Marek Seweryn; Poland	122.5 kg
Clean & Jerk	Nikolay Kolesnikov; Soviet Union	165.0 kg	László Száraz; Hungary	152.5 kg	Marian Grigoras; Romania	150.0 kg
Total	Nikolay Kolesnikov; Soviet Union	292.5 kg WR	Georgi Todorov; Bulgaria	272.5 kg	Marian Grigoras; Romania	270.0 kg
67.5 kg
Snatch	Yanko Rusev; Bulgaria	145.0 kg	Joachim Kunz; East Germany	140.0 kg	Günter Ambraß; East Germany	137.5 kg
Clean & Jerk	Yanko Rusev; Bulgaria	177.5 kg	Günter Ambraß; East Germany	175.0 kg	Joachim Kunz; East Germany	175.0 kg
Total	Yanko Rusev; Bulgaria	322.5 kg WR	Joachim Kunz; East Germany	315.0 kg	Günter Ambraß; East Germany	312.5 kg
75 kg
Snatch	Yordan Mitkov; Bulgaria	155.0 kg	Nedelcho Kolev; Bulgaria	150.0 kg	Peter Wenzel; East Germany	150.0 kg
Clean & Jerk	Yordan Mitkov; Bulgaria	190.0 kg	Nedelcho Kolev; Bulgaria	187.5 kg	Dragomir Cioroslan; Romania	185.0 kg
Total	Yordan Mitkov; Bulgaria	345.0 kg	Nedelcho Kolev; Bulgaria	337.5 kg	Peter Wenzel; East Germany	332.5 kg
82.5 kg
Snatch	Blagoy Blagoev; Bulgaria	172.5 kg WR	Paweł Rabczewski; Poland	155.0 kg	András Stark; Hungary	150.0 kg
Clean & Jerk	Yurik Vardanyan; Soviet Union	207.5 kg	Blagoy Blagoev; Bulgaria	207.5 kg	Paweł Rabczewski; Poland	197.5 kg
Total	Blagoy Blagoev; Bulgaria	380.0 kg WR	Paweł Rabczewski; Poland	352.5 kg	Dušan Poliačik; Czechoslovakia	340.0 kg
90 kg
Snatch	Péter Baczakó; Hungary	165.0 kg	Valery Shary; Soviet Union	165.0 kg	Ferenc Antalovics; Hungary	160.0 kg
Clean & Jerk	Rolf Milser; West Germany	222.5 kg WR	Péter Baczakó; Hungary	205.0 kg	Valery Shary; Soviet Union	205.0 kg
Total	Rolf Milser; West Germany	382.5 kg	Péter Baczakó; Hungary	370.0 kg	Valery Shary; Soviet Union	370.0 kg
100 kg
Snatch	David Rigert; Soviet Union	180.0 kg WR	Pavel Syrchin; Soviet Union	172.5 kg	Plamen Asparukhov; Bulgaria	170.0 kg
Clean & Jerk	David Rigert; Soviet Union	222.5 kg	Pavel Syrchin; Soviet Union	220.0 kg	János Sólyomvári; Hungary	205.0 kg
Total	David Rigert; Soviet Union	402.5 kg WR	Pavel Syrchin; Soviet Union	392.5 kg	Plamen Asparukhov; Bulgaria	375.0 kg
110 kg
Snatch	Pavel Khek; Czechoslovakia	175.0 kg	Krasimir Drandarov; Bulgaria	172.5 kg	Yury Zaitsev; Soviet Union	172.5 kg
Clean & Jerk	Yury Zaitsev; Soviet Union	227.5 kg	Krasimir Drandarov; Bulgaria	217.5 kg	Peter Käks; East Germany	215.0 kg
Total	Yury Zaitsev; Soviet Union	400.0 kg	Krasimir Drandarov; Bulgaria	390.0 kg	Peter Käks; East Germany	385.0 kg
+110 kg
Snatch	Sultan Rakhmanov; Soviet Union	195.0 kg	Gerd Bonk; East Germany	185.0 kg	Rudolf Strejček; Czechoslovakia	180.0 kg
Clean & Jerk	Jürgen Heuser; East Germany	242.5 kg	Gerd Bonk; East Germany	242.5 kg	Rudolf Strejček; Czechoslovakia	210.0 kg
Total	Gerd Bonk; East Germany	427.5 kg	Jürgen Heuser; East Germany	422.5 kg	Rudolf Strejček; Czechoslovakia	390.0 kg

== Medal table ==
Ranking by Big (Total result) medals

Rank	Nation	Gold	Silver	Bronze	Total
1	Bulgaria (BUL)	4	3	1	8
2	Soviet Union (URS)	4	1	1	6
3	East Germany (GDR)	1	2	3	6
4	West Germany (FRG)	1	0	0	1
5	Poland (POL)	0	3	0	3
6	Hungary (HUN)	0	1	2	3
7	Czechoslovakia (TCH)	0	0	2	2
8	Romania (ROU)	0	0	1	1
Totals (8 entries)		10	10	10	30
