= 1975 World Weightlifting Championships =

International weightlifting competition

1975 Men's World Championships
- Host city: Moscow, Soviet Union
- Dates: 15–23 September 1975
- Main venue: Luzhniki Sports Palace

The 1975 Men's World Weightlifting Championships were held at the Luzhniki Sports Palace in Moscow, Soviet Union from September 15 to September 23, 1975. There were 169 men in action from 33 nations.

== Medal summary ==
Event	Gold		Silver		Bronze	
52 kg
Snatch	Zygmunt Smalcerz; Poland	105.0 kg	Masatomo Takeuchi; Japan	105.0 kg	Lajos Szűcs; Hungary	100.0 kg
Clean & Jerk	Zygmunt Smalcerz; Poland	132.5 kg	Aleksandr Voronin; Soviet Union	132.5 kg	Lajos Szűcs; Hungary	130.0 kg
Total	Zygmunt Smalcerz; Poland	237.5 kg	Aleksandr Voronin; Soviet Union	232.5 kg	Lajos Szűcs; Hungary	230.0 kg
56 kg
Snatch	Waldemar Korcz; Poland	112.5 kg	Włodzimierz Jakub; Poland	112.5 kg	Karel Prohl; Czechoslovakia	110.0 kg
Clean & Jerk	Atanas Kirov; Bulgaria	145.0 kg	Karel Prohl; Czechoslovakia	140.0 kg	Waldemar Korcz; Poland	140.0 kg
Total	Atanas Kirov; Bulgaria	255.0 kg	Waldemar Korcz; Poland	252.5 kg	Karel Prohl; Czechoslovakia	250.0 kg
60 kg
Snatch	Nikolay Kolesnikov; Soviet Union	125.0 kg	Georgi Todorov; Bulgaria	125.0 kg	Setsuya Goto; Japan	122.5 kg
Clean & Jerk	Georgi Todorov; Bulgaria	160.0 kg	Takashi Saito; Japan	155.0 kg	Antoni Pawlak; Poland	155.0 kg
Total	Georgi Todorov; Bulgaria	285.0 kg WR	Nikolay Kolesnikov; Soviet Union	277.5 kg	Antoni Pawlak; Poland	275.0 kg
67.5 kg
Snatch	Zbigniew Kaczmarek; Poland	137.5 kg	Petro Korol; Soviet Union	135.0 kg	Mladen Kuchev; Bulgaria	132.5 kg
Clean & Jerk	Petro Korol; Soviet Union	177.5 kg WR	Zbigniew Kaczmarek; Poland	175.0 kg	Mukharby Kirzhinov; Soviet Union	172.5 kg
Total	Petro Korol; Soviet Union	312.5 kg	Zbigniew Kaczmarek; Poland	312.5 kg	Mladen Kuchev; Bulgaria	302.5 kg
75 kg
Snatch	Yordan Mitkov; Bulgaria	150.0 kg	Nedelcho Kolev; Bulgaria	145.0 kg	Peter Wenzel; East Germany	145.0 kg
Clean & Jerk	Peter Wenzel; East Germany	190.0 kg	Yordan Mitkov; Bulgaria	182.5 kg	Nedelcho Kolev; Bulgaria	180.0 kg
Total	Peter Wenzel; East Germany	335.0 kg	Yordan Mitkov; Bulgaria	332.5 kg	Nedelcho Kolev; Bulgaria	325.0 kg
82.5 kg
Snatch	Valery Shary; Soviet Union	162.5 kg	Trendafil Stoychev; Bulgaria	162.5 kg	Péter Baczakó; Hungary	157.5 kg
Clean & Jerk	Rolf Milser; West Germany	200.0 kg	Valery Shary; Soviet Union	195.0 kg	Trendafil Stoychev; Bulgaria	195.0 kg
Total	Valery Shary; Soviet Union	357.5 kg	Trendafil Stoychev; Bulgaria	357.5 kg	Juhani Avellan; Finland	350.0 kg
90 kg
Snatch	David Rigert; Soviet Union	167.5 kg	Michel Broillet; Switzerland	167.5 kg	Sergey Poltoratsky; Soviet Union	165.0 kg
Clean & Jerk	David Rigert; Soviet Union	210.0 kg	Sergey Poltoratsky; Soviet Union	207.5 kg	Peter Petzold; East Germany	202.5 kg
Total	David Rigert; Soviet Union	377.5 kg	Sergey Poltoratsky; Soviet Union	372.5 kg	Peter Petzold; East Germany	362.5 kg
110 kg
Snatch	Valentin Hristov; Bulgaria	180.0 kg	Vasily Mazheikov; Soviet Union	170.0 kg	Jürgen Ciezki; East Germany	170.0 kg
Clean & Jerk	Valentin Hristov; Bulgaria	237.5 kg	Vasily Mazheikov; Soviet Union	220.0 kg	Jürgen Ciezki; East Germany	220.0 kg
Total	Valentin Hristov; Bulgaria	417.5 kg	Vasily Mazheikov; Soviet Union	390.0 kg	Jürgen Ciezki; East Germany	390.0 kg
+110 kg
Snatch	Hristo Plachkov; Bulgaria	195.0 kg	Vasily Alekseyev; Soviet Union	187.5 kg	Jürgen Heuser; East Germany	180.0 kg
Clean & Jerk	Gerd Bonk; East Germany	242.5 kg	Vasily Alekseyev; Soviet Union	240.0 kg	Jürgen Heuser; East Germany	232.5 kg
Total	Vasily Alekseyev; Soviet Union	427.5 kg	Gerd Bonk; East Germany	422.5 kg	Hristo Plachkov; Bulgaria	420.0 kg

== Medal table ==
Ranking by Big (Total result) medals

Rank	Nation	Gold	Silver	Bronze	Total
1	Soviet Union	4	4	0	8
2	Bulgaria	3	2	3	8
3	Poland	1	2	1	4
4	East Germany	1	1	2	4
5	Czechoslovakia	0	0	1	1
5	Finland	0	0	1	1
5	Hungary	0	0	1	1
Totals (7 entries)		9	9	9	27

Ranking by all medals: Big (Total result) and Small (Snatch and Clean & Jerk)

Rank	Nation	Gold	Silver	Bronze	Total
1	Soviet Union	9	12	2	23
2	Bulgaria	9	6	6	21
3	Poland	5	4	3	12
4	East Germany	3	1	8	12
5	West Germany	1	0	0	1
6	Japan	0	2	1	3
7	Czechoslovakia	0	1	2	3
8	Switzerland	0	1	0	1
9	Hungary	0	0	4	4
10	Finland	0	0	1	1
Totals (10 entries)		27	27	27	81

== Team ranking ==
Rank	Team	Points
1	Soviet Union	90
2	Bulgaria	78
3	Poland	62
4	East Germany	55
5	Hungary	48
6	Czechoslovakia	32
