= 1980 European Weightlifting Championships =

European Weightlifting Championship

1980 European Championships

The 1980 European Weightlifting Championships were held at the Pinki Hall in Belgrade, SFR Yugoslavia from April 26 to May 4, 1980. This was the 59th edition of the event. There were 156 men in action from 26 nations.

== Medal summary ==
Event	Gold		Silver		Bronze	
52 kg
Snatch	Aleksandr Voronin; Soviet Union	107.5 kg	Stefan Leletko; Poland	102.5 kg	Jacek Gutowski; Poland	102.5 kg
Clean & Jerk	Stefan Leletko; Poland	135.0 kg	Aleksandr Voronin; Soviet Union	132.5 kg	Jacek Gutowski; Poland	122.5 kg
Total	Aleksandr Voronin; Soviet Union	240.0 kg	Stefan Leletko; Poland	237.5 kg	Jacek Gutowski; Poland	225.0 kg
56 kg
Snatch	Oleg Karayanidi; Soviet Union	117.5 kg	Turgay Sabriev; Bulgaria	115.0 kg	Andreas Letz; East Germany	110.0 kg
Clean & Jerk	Andreas Letz; East Germany	147.5 kg	Oleg Karayanidi; Soviet Union	145.0 kg	Frank Mavius; East Germany	145.0 kg
Total	Oleg Karayanidi; Soviet Union	262.5 kg	Andreas Letz; East Germany	257.5 kg	Frank Mavius; East Germany	255.0 kg
60 kg
Snatch	Stefan Dimitrov; Bulgaria	127.5 kg	Antoni Pawlak; Poland	125.0 kg	Włodzimierz Jakub; Poland	125.0 kg
Clean & Jerk	Yurik Sarkisyan; Soviet Union	160.0 kg	Stefan Dimitrov; Bulgaria	157.5 kg	Gelu Radu; Romania	150.0 kg
Total	Stefan Dimitrov; Bulgaria	285.0 kg	Yurik Sarkisyan; Soviet Union	280.0 kg	Antoni Pawlak; Poland	275.0 kg
67.5 kg
Snatch	Yanko Rusev; Bulgaria	147.5 kg	Günter Ambraß; East Germany	140.0 kg	Daniel Senet; France	140.0 kg
Clean & Jerk	Yanko Rusev; Bulgaria	190.0 kg WR	Günter Ambraß; East Germany	175.0 kg	Karl-Heinz Radschinsky; West Germany	175.0 kg
Total	Yanko Rusev; Bulgaria	337.5 kg WR	Günter Ambraß; East Germany	315.0 kg	Karl-Heinz Radschinsky; West Germany	312.5 kg
75 kg
Snatch	Nedelcho Kolev; Bulgaria	160.0 kg	Asen Zlatev; Bulgaria	157.5 kg	Aleksandr Pervy; Soviet Union	155.0 kg
Clean & Jerk	Asen Zlatev; Bulgaria	197.5 kg WR	Peter Wenzel; East Germany	192.5 kg	Aleksandr Pervy; Soviet Union	192.5 kg
Total	Asen Zlatev; Bulgaria	355.0 kg WR	Nedelcho Kolev; Bulgaria	347.5 kg	Aleksandr Pervy; Soviet Union	347.5 kg
82.5 kg
Snatch	Yurik Vardanyan; Soviet Union	167.5 kg	Janusz Alchimowicz; Poland	157.5 kg	Romuald Jazbowiecki; Poland	157.5 kg
Clean & Jerk	Yurik Vardanyan; Soviet Union	200.0 kg	Horst Appel; West Germany	192.5 kg	Norbert Bergmann; West Germany	192.5 kg
Total	Yurik Vardanyan; Soviet Union	367.5 kg	Detlef Blasche; East Germany	345.0 kg	Horst Appel; West Germany	342.5 kg
90 kg
Snatch	Rumen Aleksandrov; Bulgaria	175.0 kg	Valery Shary; Soviet Union	170.0 kg	Gennady Bessonov; Soviet Union	167.5 kg
Clean & Jerk	Rumen Aleksandrov; Bulgaria	215.0 kg	Gennady Bessonov; Soviet Union	215.0 kg	Valery Shary; Soviet Union	212.5 kg
Total	Rumen Aleksandrov; Bulgaria	390.0 kg	Valery Shary; Soviet Union	382.5 kg	Gennady Bessonov; Soviet Union	382.5 kg
100 kg
Snatch	David Rigert; Soviet Union	177.5 kg	Imre Vegi; Hungary	172.5 kg	László Varga; Hungary	170.0 kg
Clean & Jerk	David Rigert; Soviet Union	210.0 kg	Michael Hennig; East Germany	210.0 kg	Plamen Asparukhov; Bulgaria	202.5 kg
Total	David Rigert; Soviet Union	387.5 kg	Michael Hennig; East Germany	372.5 kg	Plamen Asparukhov; Bulgaria	370.0 kg
110 kg
Snatch	Leonid Taranenko; Soviet Union	190.0 kg WR	Valentin Hristov; Bulgaria	175.0 kg	Pavel Khek; Czechoslovakia	175.0 kg
Clean & Jerk	Leonid Taranenko; Soviet Union	230.0 kg	Valentin Hristov; Bulgaria	227.5 kg	Jürgen Ciezki; East Germany	217.5 kg
Total	Leonid Taranenko; Soviet Union	420.0 kg WR	Valentin Hristov; Bulgaria	402.5 kg	Jürgen Ciezki; East Germany	390.0 kg
+110 kg
Snatch	Sultan Rakhmanov; Soviet Union	190.0 kg	Yevgeni Popov; Bulgaria	185.0 kg	Rudolf Strejček; Czechoslovakia	180.0 kg
Clean & Jerk	Sultan Rakhmanov; Soviet Union	240.0 kg	Gerd Bonk; East Germany	232.5 kg	Yevgeni Popov; Bulgaria	232.5 kg
Total	Sultan Rakhmanov; Soviet Union	430.0 kg	Yevgeni Popov; Bulgaria	417.5 kg	Gerd Bonk; East Germany	407.5 kg

== Medal table ==
Ranking by Big (Total result) medals

Rank	Nation	Gold	Silver	Bronze	Total
1	Soviet Union (URS)	6	2	2	10
2	Bulgaria (BUL)	4	3	1	8
3	East Germany (GDR)	0	4	3	7
4	Poland (POL)	0	1	2	3
5	West Germany (FRG)	0	0	2	2
Totals (5 entries)		10	10	10	30
