= Weightlifting at the 1976 Summer Olympics =

Weightlifting at the Games of the XXI Olympiad
- Venue: St. Michel Arena
- Dates: 18–27 July 1976
- Competitors: 173 from 46 nations

The weightlifting competition at the 1976 Summer Olympics in Montreal consisted of nine weight classes, all for men only. The clean and press was dropped from the included lifts after the 1972 games in Munich, due to disagreement over proper form. The Games of 1976 were the first Olympics to start testing for anabolic steroids, although athletes were tested only during the competition, thus leaving them free to use performance-enhancing drugs in the years prior.

== Medal summary ==
Games	Gold	Silver	Bronze
52 kg	Aleksandr Voronin; Soviet Union	György Kőszegi; Hungary	Mohammad Nassiri; Iran
56 kg	Norair Nurikyan; Bulgaria	Grzegorz Cziura; Poland	Kenkichi Ando; Japan
60 kg	Nikolay Kolesnikov; Soviet Union	Georghi Todorov; Bulgaria	Kazumasa Hirai; Japan
67.5 kg	Pyotr Korol; Soviet Union	Daniel Senet; France	Kazimierz Czarnecki; Poland
75 kg	Yordan Mitkov; Bulgaria	Vardan Militosyan; Soviet Union	Peter Wenzel; East Germany
82.5 kg	Valery Shary; Soviet Union	Trendafil Stoitchev; Bulgaria	Peter Baczako; Hungary
90 kg	David Rigert; Soviet Union	Lee James; United States	Atanas Shopov; Bulgaria
110 kg	Yury Zaitsev; Soviet Union	Krastiu Semerdzhiev; Bulgaria	Tadeusz Rutkowski; Poland
+110 kg	Vasily Alekseyev; Soviet Union	Gerd Bonk; East Germany	Helmut Losch; East Germany

Zbigniew Kaczmarek of Poland originally won the 67.5 kg event, Valentin Khristov of Bulgaria originally won the 110 kg event, and Blagoy Blagoev of Bulgaria originally won silver in the 82.5 kg event, but they were disqualified and stripped of their medals after they tested positive for anabolic steroids.

== Medal table ==
Rank	Nation	Gold	Silver	Bronze	Total
1	Soviet Union	7	1	0	8
2	Bulgaria	2	3	1	6
3	East Germany	0	1	2	3
3	Poland	0	1	2	3
5	Hungary	0	1	1	2
6	France	0	1	0	1
6	United States	0	1	0	1
8	Japan	0	0	2	2
9	Iran	0	0	1	1
Totals (9 entries)		9	9	9	27

== Sources ==
- "Olympic Medal Winners". International Olympic Committee.
