= 1974 World Weightlifting Championships =

International weightlifting competition

1974 Men's World Championships
- Host city: Manila, Philippines
- Dates: 21–29 September 1974

The 1974 Men's World Weightlifting Championships were held in Manila, Philippines from September 21 to September 29, 1974. There were 143 men in action from 32 nations.

== Medal summary ==
Event	Gold		Silver		Bronze	
52 kg
Snatch	György Kőszegi; Hungary	105.0 kg	Takeshi Horikoshi; Japan	105.0 kg	Mohammad Nassiri; Iran	100.0 kg
Clean & Jerk	Mohammad Nassiri; Iran	132.5 kg	Zygmunt Smalcerz; Poland	127.5 kg	Lajos Szűcs; Hungary	125.0 kg
Total	Mohammad Nassiri; Iran	232.5 kg	György Kőszegi; Hungary	230.0 kg	Takeshi Horikoshi; Japan	227.5 kg
56 kg
Snatch	Leszek Skorupa; Poland	112.5 kg	Atanas Kirov; Bulgaria	110.0 kg	Davoud Maleki; Iran	110.0 kg
Clean & Jerk	Jiro Hosotani; Japan	147.5 kg	Atanas Kirov; Bulgaria	145.0 kg	Leszek Skorupa; Poland	137.5 kg
Total	Atanas Kirov; Bulgaria	255.0 kg	Leszek Skorupa; Poland	250.0 kg	Jiro Hosotani; Japan	245.0 kg
60 kg
Snatch	Georgi Todorov; Bulgaria	125.0 kg	Norair Nurikyan; Bulgaria	122.5 kg	Jan Wojnowski; Poland	122.5 kg
Clean & Jerk	Nikolay Kolesnikov; Soviet Union	157.5 kg	Georgi Todorov; Bulgaria	155.0 kg	Norair Nurikyan; Bulgaria	155.0 kg
Total	Georgi Todorov; Bulgaria	280.0 kg WR	Nikolay Kolesnikov; Soviet Union	277.5 kg	Norair Nurikyan; Bulgaria	277.5 kg
67.5 kg
Snatch	Petro Korol; Soviet Union	130.0 kg	Nasrollah Dehnavi; Iran	130.0 kg	Zbigniew Kaczmarek; Poland	130.0 kg
Clean & Jerk	Petro Korol; Soviet Union	175.0 kg	Zbigniew Kaczmarek; Poland	172.5 kg	Mukharby Kirzhinov; Soviet Union	167.5 kg
Total	Petro Korol; Soviet Union	305.0 kg	Zbigniew Kaczmarek; Poland	302.5 kg	Nasrollah Dehnavi; Iran	295.0 kg
75 kg
Snatch	Rumen Rusev; Bulgaria	152.5 kg	Nedelcho Kolev; Bulgaria	150.0 kg	Peter Wenzel; East Germany	142.5 kg
Clean & Jerk	Nedelcho Kolev; Bulgaria	185.0 kg	Peter Wenzel; East Germany	180.0 kg	Rumen Rusev; Bulgaria	180.0 kg
Total	Nedelcho Kolev; Bulgaria	335.0 kg	Rumen Rusev; Bulgaria	332.5 kg	Peter Wenzel; East Germany	322.5 kg
82.5 kg
Snatch	Vladimir Ryzhenkov; Soviet Union	160.0 kg	Trendafil Stoychev; Bulgaria	155.0 kg	Leif Jenssen; Norway	155.0 kg
Clean & Jerk	Trendafil Stoychev; Bulgaria	195.0 kg	Leif Jenssen; Norway	195.0 kg	Tsvetko Petkov; Bulgaria	195.0 kg
Total	Trendafil Stoychev; Bulgaria	350.0 kg	Leif Jenssen; Norway	350.0 kg	Rolf Milser; West Germany	347.5 kg
90 kg
Snatch	David Rigert; Soviet Union	172.5 kg	Sergey Poltoratsky; Soviet Union	162.5 kg	Jaakko Kailajärvi; Finland	160.0 kg
Clean & Jerk	David Rigert; Soviet Union	215.0 kg WR	Sergey Poltoratsky; Soviet Union	205.0 kg	Andon Nikolov; Bulgaria	202.5 kg
Total	David Rigert; Soviet Union	387.5 kg WR	Sergey Poltoratsky; Soviet Union	367.5 kg	Peter Petzold; East Germany	355.0 kg
110 kg
Snatch	Valery Ustyuzhin; Soviet Union	167.5 kg	Jürgen Ciezki; East Germany	165.0 kg	Yury Zaitsev; Soviet Union	160.0 kg
Clean & Jerk	Jürgen Ciezki; East Germany	212.5 kg	Valery Ustyuzhin; Soviet Union	212.5 kg	Yury Zaitsev; Soviet Union	207.5 kg
Total	Valery Ustyuzhin; Soviet Union	380.0 kg	Jürgen Ciezki; East Germany	377.5 kg	Yury Zaitsev; Soviet Union	367.5 kg
+110 kg
Snatch	Vasily Alekseyev; Soviet Union	185.0 kg	Hristo Plachkov; Bulgaria	180.0 kg	Gerd Bonk; East Germany	172.5 kg
Clean & Jerk	Vasily Alekseyev; Soviet Union	240.0 kg	Serge Reding; Belgium	220.0 kg	Jürgen Heuser; East Germany	217.5 kg
Total	Vasily Alekseyev; Soviet Union	425.0 kg	Serge Reding; Belgium	390.0 kg	Jürgen Heuser; East Germany	382.5 kg

== Medal table ==
Ranking by Big (Total result) medals

Rank	Nation	Gold	Silver	Bronze	Total
1	Soviet Union	4	2	1	7
2	Bulgaria	4	1	1	6
3	Iran	1	0	1	2
4	Poland	0	2	0	2
5	East Germany	0	1	3	4
6	Belgium	0	1	0	1
6	Hungary	0	1	0	1
6	Norway	0	1	0	1
9	Japan	0	0	2	2
10	West Germany	0	0	1	1
Totals (10 entries)		9	9	9	27

Ranking by all medals: Big (Total result) and Small (Snatch and Clean & Jerk)

Rank	Nation	Gold	Silver	Bronze	Total
1	Soviet Union	13	5	4	22
2	Bulgaria	8	8	5	21
3	Iran	2	1	3	6
4	Poland	1	4	3	8
5	East Germany	1	3	6	10
6	Japan	1	1	2	4
7	Hungary	1	1	1	3
8	Norway	0	2	1	3
9	Belgium	0	2	0	2
10	Finland	0	0	1	1
10	West Germany	0	0	1	1
Totals (11 entries)		27	27	27	81

== Team ranking ==
Rank	Team	Points
1	Bulgaria	78
2	Soviet Union	74
3	Poland	50
4	Japan	42
5	East Germany	39
6	Hungary	35
