= 1979 World Weightlifting Championships =

International weightlifting competition

1979 Men's World Championships
- Host city: Thessaloniki, Greece
- Dates: 3–11 November 1979

The 1979 Men's World Weightlifting Championships were held in Thessaloniki, Greece from November 3 to November 11, 1979. There were 189 men in action from 39 nations.

== Medal summary ==
Event	Gold		Silver		Bronze	
52 kg
Snatch	Wu Shude; China	110.0 kg	Aleksandr Voronin; Soviet Union	110.0 kg	Cai Juncheng; China	107.5 kg
Clean & Jerk	Kanybek Osmonaliyev; Soviet Union	137.5 kg	Ferenc Hornyák; Hungary	135.0 kg	Aleksandr Voronin; Soviet Union	132.5 kg
Total	Kanybek Osmonaliyev; Soviet Union	242.5 kg	Ferenc Hornyák; Hungary	242.5 kg	Shared silver	
Total	Kanybek Osmonaliyev; Soviet Union	242.5 kg	Aleksandr Voronin; Soviet Union	242.5 kg	Shared silver	
56 kg
Snatch	Tadeusz Dembończyk; Poland	117.5 kg	Anton Kodzhabashev; Bulgaria	117.5 kg	Daniel Núñez; Cuba	115.0 kg
Clean & Jerk	Viktor Veretennikov; Soviet Union	150.0 kg	Anton Kodzhabashev; Bulgaria	150.0 kg	Andreas Letz; East Germany	147.5 kg
Total	Anton Kodzhabashev; Bulgaria	267.5 kg	Viktor Veretennikov; Soviet Union	262.5 kg	Tadeusz Dembończyk; Poland	260.0 kg
60 kg
Snatch	Marek Seweryn; Poland	127.5 kg	Nikolay Kolesnikov; Soviet Union	125.0 kg	Zhang Zhifang; China	125.0 kg
Clean & Jerk	Marek Seweryn; Poland	155.0 kg	Georgi Todorov; Bulgaria	155.0 kg	Setsuya Goto; Japan	150.0 kg
Total	Marek Seweryn; Poland	282.5 kg	Georgi Todorov; Bulgaria	275.0 kg	Setsuya Goto; Japan	270.0 kg
67.5 kg
Snatch	Yanko Rusev; Bulgaria	145.0 kg	Joachim Kunz; East Germany	145.0 kg	Daniel Senet; France	142.5 kg
Clean & Jerk	Yanko Rusev; Bulgaria	187.5 kg WR	Joachim Kunz; East Germany	180.0 kg	Yao Jingyuan; China	172.5 kg
Total	Yanko Rusev; Bulgaria	332.5 kg WR	Joachim Kunz; East Germany	325.0 kg	Daniel Senet; France	312.5 kg
75 kg
Snatch	Roberto Urrutia; Cuba	155.0 kg	Nedelcho Kolev; Bulgaria	155.0 kg	Yordan Mitkov; Bulgaria	150.0 kg
Clean & Jerk	Roberto Urrutia; Cuba	190.0 kg	Peter Wenzel; East Germany	190.0 kg	Jürgen Negwer; West Germany	187.5 kg
Total	Roberto Urrutia; Cuba	345.0 kg	Nedelcho Kolev; Bulgaria	342.5 kg	Peter Wenzel; East Germany	337.5 kg
82.5 kg
Snatch	Yurik Vardanyan; Soviet Union	170.0 kg	Blagoy Blagoev; Bulgaria	170.0 kg	Bertalan Mandzák; Hungary	155.0 kg
Clean & Jerk	Yurik Vardanyan; Soviet Union	200.0 kg	András Stark; Hungary	195.0 kg	Norbert Bergmann; West Germany	195.0 kg
Total	Yurik Vardanyan; Soviet Union	370.0 kg	Blagoy Blagoev; Bulgaria	362.5 kg	Dušan Poliačik; Czechoslovakia	350.0 kg
90 kg
Snatch	Gennady Bessonov; Soviet Union	170.0 kg	Rolf Milser; West Germany	165.0 kg	Witold Walo; Poland	160.0 kg
Clean & Jerk	Rolf Milser; West Germany	212.5 kg	Gennady Bessonov; Soviet Union	210.0 kg	Witold Walo; Poland	202.5 kg
Total	Gennady Bessonov; Soviet Union	380.0 kg	Rolf Milser; West Germany	377.5 kg	Witold Walo; Poland	362.5 kg
100 kg
Snatch	János Sólyomvári; Hungary	175.0 kg	Ota Zaremba; Czechoslovakia	172.5 kg	Plamen Asparukhov; Bulgaria	167.5 kg
Clean & Jerk	Pavel Syrchin; Soviet Union	217.5 kg	Anton Baraniak; Czechoslovakia	210.0 kg	János Sólyomvári; Hungary	210.0 kg
Total	Pavel Syrchin; Soviet Union	385.0 kg	János Sólyomvári; Hungary	385.0 kg	Alberto Blanco; Cuba	372.5 kg
110 kg
Snatch	Sergey Arakelov; Soviet Union	185.0 kg	Leonid Taranenko; Soviet Union	182.5 kg	Valentin Hristov; Bulgaria	177.5 kg
Clean & Jerk	Sergey Arakelov; Soviet Union	225.0 kg	Valentin Hristov; Bulgaria	225.0 kg	Leif Nilsson; Sweden	220.0 kg
Total	Sergey Arakelov; Soviet Union	410.0 kg	Valentin Hristov; Bulgaria	402.5 kg	Leonid Taranenko; Soviet Union	402.5 kg
+110 kg
Snatch	Sultan Rakhmanov; Soviet Union	192.5 kg	Jürgen Heuser; East Germany	187.5 kg	Rudolf Strejček; Czechoslovakia	185.0 kg
Clean & Jerk	Sultan Rakhmanov; Soviet Union	237.5 kg	Jürgen Heuser; East Germany	232.5 kg	Gerd Bonk; East Germany	230.0 kg
Total	Sultan Rakhmanov; Soviet Union	430.0 kg	Jürgen Heuser; East Germany	420.0 kg	Gerd Bonk; East Germany	412.5 kg

== Medal table ==
Ranking by Big (Total result) medals

Rank	Nation	Gold	Silver	Bronze	Total
1	Soviet Union	6	2	1	9
2	Bulgaria	2	4	0	6
3	Poland	1	0	2	3
4	Cuba	1	0	1	2
5	East Germany	0	2	2	4
6	Hungary	0	2	0	2
7	West Germany	0	1	0	1
8	Czechoslovakia	0	0	1	1
8	France	0	0	1	1
8	Japan	0	0	1	1
Totals (10 entries)		10	11	9	30

Ranking by all medals: Big (Total result) and Small (Snatch and Clean & Jerk)

Rank	Nation	Gold	Silver	Bronze	Total
1	Soviet Union	16	6	2	24
2	Bulgaria	4	10	3	17
3	Poland	4	0	4	8
4	Cuba	3	0	2	5
5	Hungary	1	4	2	7
6	West Germany	1	2	2	5
7	China	1	0	3	4
8	East Germany	0	7	4	11
9	Czechoslovakia	0	2	2	4
10	France	0	0	2	2
10	Japan	0	0	2	2
12	Sweden	0	0	1	1
Totals (12 entries)		30	31	29	90
