= Weightlifting at the 1976 Summer Olympics – Men's 60 kg =

Weightlifting at the Olympics

Men's 60 kg at the Games of the XXI Olympiad
- Venue: St. Michel Arena
- Date: 20 July 1976
- Competitors: 17 from 14 nations
- Winning total: 285.0 kg OR

Medalists
1st place, gold medalist(s)		Nikolay Kolesnikov	Soviet Union
2nd place, silver medalist(s)		Georgi Todorov	Bulgaria
3rd place, bronze medalist(s)		Kazumasa Hirai	Japan

The men's 60 kg weightlifting competitions at the 1976 Summer Olympics in Montreal took place on 20 July at the St. Michel Arena. It was the thirteenth appearance of the featherweight class.

== Results ==
Rank	Name	Country	kg
1	Nikolay Kolesnikov	Soviet Union	285.0
2	Georgi Todorov	Bulgaria	280.0
3	Kazumasa Hirai	Japan	275.0
4	Takashi Saito	Japan	262.5
5	Eduard Weitz	Israel	262.5
6	Davoud Maleki	Iran	260.0
7	Pedro Fuentes	Cuba	257.5
8	Om Jong-guk	North Korea	255.0
9	Andrés Santoyo	Mexico	250.0
10	Peppino Tanti	Italy	247.5
11	Dominique Bidard	France	245.0
12	Chua Koon Siong	Singapore	230.0
13	Victor Daniels	Great Britain	227.5
AC	Antoni Pawlak	Poland	120.0
AC	Todor Todorov	Bulgaria	DNF
AC	Jan Łostowski	Poland	DNF
AC	Arne Norrback	Sweden	DQ
