= 1976 Summer Olympics medal table =

1976 Summer Olympics medals
- Location: Montreal, Canada

Highlights
- Most gold medals: Soviet Union (49)
- Most total medals: Soviet Union (125)
- Medalling NOCs: 41

World map showing the medal achievements of each country during the 1976 Summer Olympics Legend: represents countries that won at least one gold medal. represents countries that won at least one silver medal but no gold medals. represents countries that won at least one bronze medal (no gold or silver). represents participating countries that did not win medals. represents participating countries that competed until the 3rd day before those nations withdrew from the Games due to boycott and did not win medals. represents entities that did not participate at the 1976 Summer Olympics.

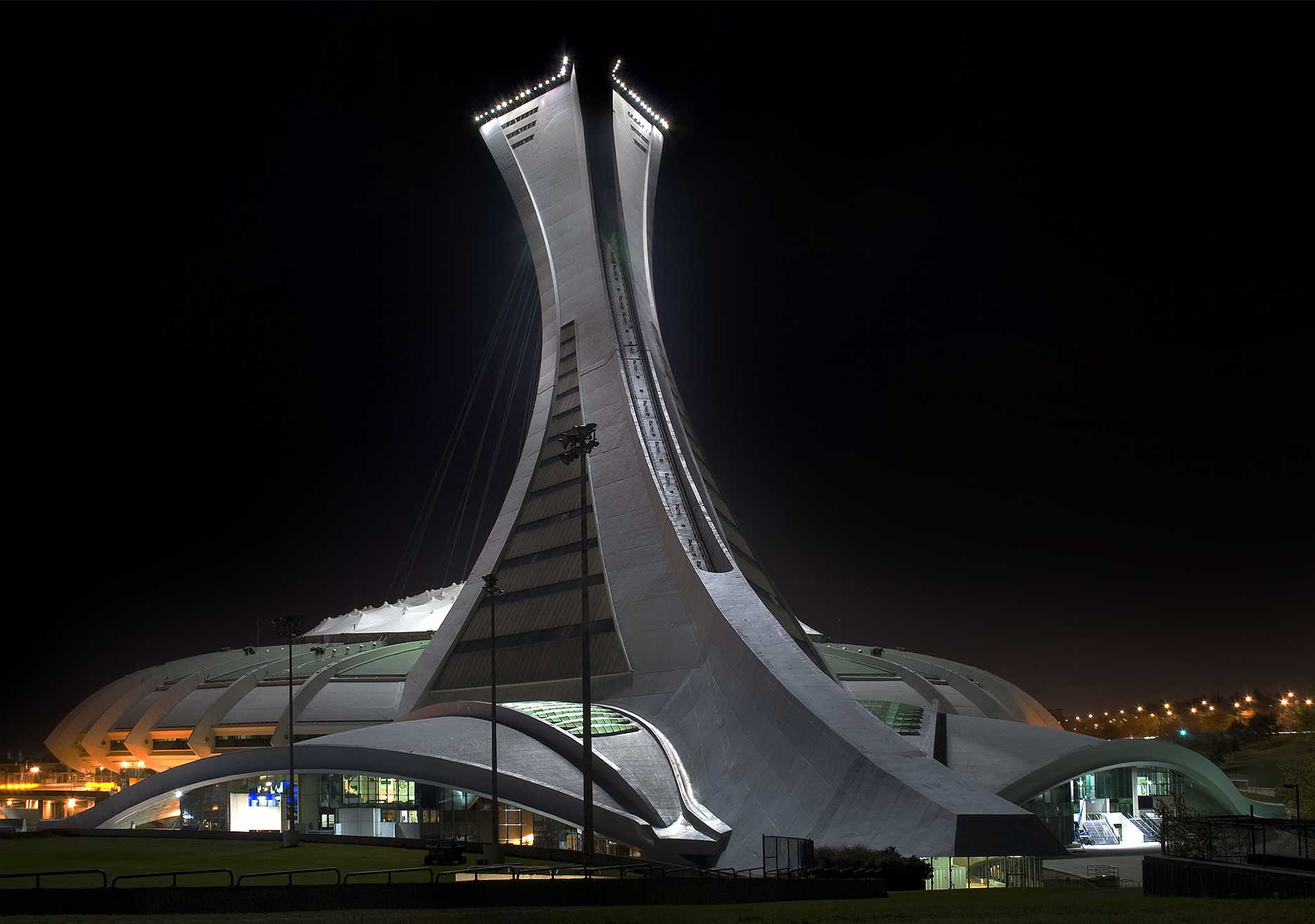
Montreal's Olympic Stadium (its tower completed after the Games) was the main venue for the 1976 Summer Olympics.

The 1976 Summer Olympics, officially known as the Games of the XXI Olympiad, were a summer multi-sport event held in Montreal, Quebec, Canada, from July 17 to August 1, 1976. A total of 6,084 athletes from 92 countries represented by National Olympic Committees (NOCs) participated in these Games, competing in 198 events in 23 sports.

Twenty-eight African countries missed these Games. This boycott decision was taken in response to the participation of New Zealand, because its national rugby union team (the All Blacks) continued to play rugby with South Africa, which had been banned from the Olympic movement since 1964 due to its apartheid policies.

Athletes from 42 countries won at least one medal, leaving 51 countries in blank in the medals table. The Soviet Union won the highest number of gold medals (49) and overall medals (125). The Games were dominated by the Soviet Bloc, with the USSR and Eastern European states occupying seven out of top ten places in the medal standings. Thailand and Bermuda won the first medals in their Olympic history, with Bermuda being the least populous territory to ever win a Summer Olympic medal until Alessandra Perilli won bronze for San Marino in trap shooting in 2020. Bermuda, however, became the smallest nation to win a Summer Olympic gold at the same games, thanks to Flora Duffy, which was also their first medal since 1976. The Montreal Summer Olympics proved disastrous to Canada not only in financial terms; it failed to win a single gold medal despite being the host nation. Overall, it was 27th in the medal table, which remains the worst result a host nation has ever scored in the history of the Summer Games.

Russian Nikolai Andrianov of the Soviet Union won seven medals (four gold, two silver and one bronze medals), becoming the most medaled athlete in these Games.

== Medal table ==
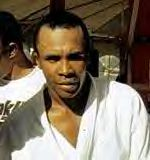
Sugar Ray Leonard won the gold medal in boxing's light welterweight category at the 1976 Summer Olympics.

The medal table is based on information provided by the International Olympic Committee (IOC) and is consistent with IOC convention in its published medal tables. The table uses the Olympic medal table sorting method. By default, the table is ordered by the number of gold medals the athletes from a nation have won, where a nation is an entity represented by a NOC. The number of silver medals is taken into consideration next and then the number of bronze medals. If teams are still tied, equal ranking is given and they are listed alphabetically by their IOC country code.

A total of 198 events in 23 different sports were contested at the Montreal Games. In boxing and judo, two bronze medals were awarded for each weight class. In gymnastics, two bronze medals were awarded for third–place ties in the men's pommel horse and men's horizontal bar events, and a second–place tie in the women's vault resulted in two silver medals and no bronze medal awarded for that event.

* Host nation (Canada)

1976 Summer Olympics medal table
Rank	NOC	Gold	Silver	Bronze	Total
1	Soviet Union	49	41	35	125
2	East Germany	40	25	25	90
3	United States	34	35	25	94
4	West Germany	10	12	17	39
5	Japan	9	6	10	25
6	Poland	7	6	13	26
7	Bulgaria	6	9	7	22
8	Cuba	6	4	3	13
9	Romania	4	9	14	27
10	Hungary	4	5	13	22
11	Finland	4	2	0	6
12	Sweden	4	1	0	5
13	Great Britain	3	5	5	13
14	Italy	2	7	4	13
15	France	2	3	4	9
16	Yugoslavia	2	3	3	8
17	Czechoslovakia	2	2	4	8
18	New Zealand	2	1	1	4
19	South Korea	1	1	4	6
20	Switzerland	1	1	2	4
21	Jamaica	1	1	0	2
21	North Korea	1	1	0	2
21	Norway	1	1	0	2
24	Denmark	1	0	2	3
25	Mexico	1	0	1	2
26	Trinidad and Tobago	1	0	0	1
27	Canada*	0	5	6	11
28	Belgium	0	3	3	6
29	Netherlands	0	2	3	5
30	Portugal	0	2	0	2
30	Spain	0	2	0	2
32	Australia	0	1	4	5
33	Iran	0	1	1	2
34	Mongolia	0	1	0	1
34	Venezuela	0	1	0	1
36	Brazil	0	0	2	2
37	Austria	0	0	1	1
37	Bermuda	0	0	1	1
37	Pakistan	0	0	1	1
37	Puerto Rico	0	0	1	1
37	Thailand	0	0	1	1
Totals (41 entries)		198	199	216	613

== Change by doping ==
Olympics	Athlete	Country	Medal	Event	Ref
1976 Summer Olympics	Valentin Khristov	Bulgaria	1st place, gold medalist(s)	Weightlifting, Men's 110 kg	
1976 Summer Olympics	Blagoy Blagoev	Bulgaria	2nd place, silver medalist(s)	Weightlifting, Men's 82.5 kg	
1976 Summer Olympics	Zbigniew Kaczmarek	Poland	1st place, gold medalist(s)	Weightlifting, Men's 67.5 kg	
