= Rudolf Plyukfelder =

Soviet weightlifter (1928–2026)

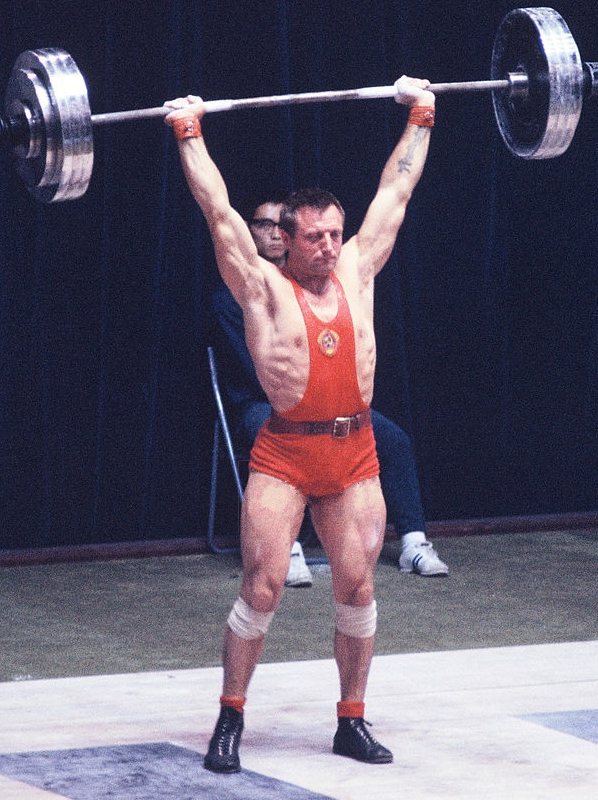
- Plyukfelder at the 1964 Olympics

Personal information
- Born: 6 September 1928 Novoorlivka, Ukrainian SSR, Soviet Union
- Died: 24 April 2026 (aged 97) Zierenberg, Hesse, Germany
- Height: 1.72 m (5 ft 8 in)
- Weight: 83 kg (183 lb)

Sport
- Sport: Weightlifting
- Club: Trud Shakhty
Medal record
Representing the Soviet Union
Olympic Games
Gold medal – first place	1964 Tokyo	-82.5 kg
World Championships
Gold medal – first place	1959 Warsaw	-82.5 kg
Gold medal – first place	1961 Vienna	-82.5 kg
Silver medal – second place	1963 Stockholm	-82.5 kg
Gold medal – first place	1964 Tokyo	-82.5 kg

Rudolf Vladimirovich Plyukfelder (Russian: Рудольф Владимирович Плюкфельдер; 6 September 1928 – 24 April 2026) was a Soviet weightlifter and weightlifting coach. As a competitor he won world titles in 1959 and 1961 and an Olympic gold medal in 1964. As a coach he prepared a series of Olympic champions including Aleksey Vakhonin, Vasily Alekseyev, David Rigert, Nikolay Kolesnikov, Aleksandr Voronin and Viktor Tregubov.

== Biography ==
Plyukfelder was born to a Russian German family in Ukraine. His father and older brother were put to death in 1941 when Germany invaded the Soviet Union. The rest of the family was sent to a labor camp in Siberia, where Plyukfelder started to work at a coal mine at the age of 14. As a hobby he tried track and field athletics and wrestling, in which he won the regional championships in 1948–49. He changed to weightlifting only in 1950 when he was already 22. Until 1962, when he moved to Rostov Oblast, he trained on his own, as there was no weightlifting coach in his area, yet he became the world's best light-heavyweight competitor, winning world titles in 1959 and 1961, European titles in 1959–61, and an Olympic gold in 1964. He also set eight official world records in 1969–1961: one in the press, five in the snatch, and two in the total.

While competing, Plyukfelder coached some of his teammates, such as Aleksey Vakhonin whom he made an Olympic champion from scratch. He retired shortly after the 1964 Olympics and had a long and successful career as a coach in Shakhty, which he turned into a major Soviet weightlifting school. In the early 1990s, due to a conflict with Vasily Alekseyev, he immigrated to Germany, where he had a large family of wife, three daughters and five grandchildren. He continued daily training with weights through his 90s, and won one masters world title in 1992, but decided not to compete again due to lack of interest in competitions. In 2000, aged 72 his results were as follows: squat – 160 kg, snatch – 100 kg, body weight – 93 kg. In 2018, aged 90, he routinely did 10 squat repetitions with 100 kg.

Plyukfelder died in Zierenberg, Hesse, Germany on 24 April 2026, at the age of 97.

== Books ==
- Rudolf Plyukfelder (1966). Металл и люди. Moscow: Fizkultura i sport.
- Rudolf Plyukfelder (2009). Чужой среди своих. Moscow: Center of German Culture. ISBN 978-5-93227-013-4.
