= Militosyan =

Militosyan (Armenian: Միլիտոսյան) is an Armenian surname. Notable people with the surname include:

- Israel Militosyan (born 1968), Armenian weightlifter
- Vahagn Militosyan (born 1993), Armenian football player
- Vardan Militosyan (1950–2015), Soviet Armenian weightlifter
