= Georgi Todorov =

Georgi Todorov may refer to:

- Georgi Todorov (canoeist) (born 1927), Bulgaria at the 1964 Summer Olympics
- Georgi Todorov (general) (1864–1934), Bulgarian general
- Georgi Todorov (gymnast) (born 1949), Bulgarian Olympic gymnast
- Georgi Todorov (shot putter) (born 1960), Bulgarian athlete
- Georgi Todorov (weightlifter) (born 1952), Bulgarian weightlifter, 1976 Olympics silver medalist
