= Skorupa =

Skorupa is a Polish surname. Notable people with the surname include:

- Katarzyna Skorupa (born 1984), Polish volleyball player
- Leszek Skorupa (1951–2018), Polish weightlifter
