= Hosotani =

Hosotani (written: 細谷) is a Japanese surname. Notable people with the surname include:

- Ichiro Hosotani (細谷 一郎, born 1946), Japanese footballer
- Jiro Hosotani (細谷 治朗, born 1950), Japanese weightlifter
