= Nikolay Kolesnikov =

Nikolay Kolesnikov is the name of:

- Nikolay Kolesnikov (weightlifter) (born 1952), Soviet weightlifter
- Nikolay Kolesnikov (sprinter) (born 1953), Soviet sprinter
- Nikolay Kolesnikov (marathoner) (born 1961), Russian marathoner
