= Pedro Fuentes =

Cuban weightlifter

Personal information
- Nationality: Cuban
- Born: 17 January 1957 (age 68)

Sport
- Sport: Weightlifting

Pedro Fuentes (born 17 January 1957) is a Cuban weightlifter. He competed in the men's featherweight event at the 1976 Summer Olympics.
