= Jaakko Kailajärvi =

Finnish weightlifter

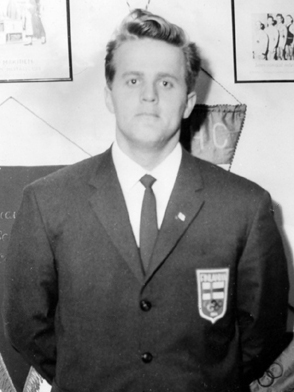

Personal information
- Born: 1 July 1941 (age 85) Tampere, Finland
- Height: 171 cm (5 ft 7 in)
- Weight: 75–92 kg (165–203 lb)

Sport
- Sport: Weightlifting

Jaakko Rafael Kailajärvi (born 1 July 1941) is a retired Finnish weightlifter who set two light-heavyweight world records in the snatch in 1962. He placed second-third in this event at the 1972 and 1974 world championships. Kailajärvi competed in light-heavyweight and middle-heavyweight divisions at the 1964, 1968, 1972 and 1976 Olympics with the best result of fifth place in 1968. His elder brother Jouni was also an Olympic weightlifter.
