= Boris Pavlov (weightlifter) =

Russian weightlifter (1947–2004)

Personal information
- Born: 21 March 1947 Navoloki, Russia
- Died: 22 May 2004 (aged 57) Furmanov, Russia
- Height: 172 cm (5 ft 8 in)

Sport
- Sport: Weightlifting
Medal record
Representing the Soviet Union
World Championships
Gold medal – first place	1971 Lima	-82.5 kg
European Championships
Gold medal – first place	1972 Constanta	-82.5 kg

Boris Andreyevich Pavlov (Russian: Борис Андреевич Павлов; 21 March 1947 – 22 May 2004) was a Russian weightlifter who won a world title in 1971. Next year he won a European title and competed at the 1972 Olympics, but failed to complete the press event. Between 1969 and 1972 Pavlov set six ratified world records.

Pavlov spent his last 20 years in Furmanov, where a memorial weightlifting tournament is held in his honor after his death.
