= Christian Kinck =

French weightlifter

Personal information
- Nationality: French
- Born: 23 January 1956
- Died: 15 October 2014 (aged 58)

Sport
- Sport: Weightlifting

Christian Kinck (23 January 1956 – 15 October 2014) was a French weightlifter. He competed in the men's middleweight event at the 1976 Summer Olympics.
