= Arne Norrback =

Swedish weightlifter

Personal information
- Nationality: Swedish
- Born: 14 December 1937 (age 87); Lumijoki, Finland

Sport
- Sport: Weightlifting

Arne Norrback (born 14 December 1937) is a Swedish weightlifter. He competed in the men's featherweight event at the 1976 Summer Olympics. Born in Lumijoki, Finland, Norrback moved to Sweden in 1961.
