= Pavel Syrchin =

Soviet weightlifter (1957–2020)

Personal information
- Born: 7 November 1957 Gubakha, Perm Oblast, Russian SFSR, Soviet Union
- Died: 24 October 2020 (aged 62) Perm, Russia

Sport
- Sport: Weightlifting
- Coached by: Yevgeny Ektov
Medal record
Representing the Soviet Union
World Championships
Gold medal – first place	1979 Thessaloniki	-100 kg
European Championships
Silver medal – second place	1979 Varna	-100 kg

Pavel Leonidovich Syrchin (Russian: Павел Леонидович Сырчин; 7 November 1957 – 24 October 2020) was a Soviet heavyweight weightlifter. In 1979, he won the Soviet and world titles and placed second at the European championships.

Syrchin was an honored citizen of Krasnokamsk, where he worked as a weightlifting coach. His son Pavel Jr. also became a competitive weightlifter.

He died from COVID-19 in Perm, Russia, on 24 October 2020.
