= Russ Prior =

Canadian weightlifter (1949–2017)

Personal information
- Full name: Russel Prior
- Born: July 11, 1949 Hamilton, Ontario, Canada
- Died: February 17, 2017 (aged 67)
- Height: 183 cm (6 ft 0 in)
- Weight: 110 kg (243 lb)

Sport
- Country: Canada
- Sport: Weightlifting
- Weight class: 110 kg
- Team: National team
Medal record
Men's Weightlifting
Representing Canada
World Championships
Bronze medal – third place	1976	110 kg (snatch)
- Updated on 10 January 2017

Russel "Russ" Prior (July 11, 1949 – February 17, 2017) was a Canadian weightlifter, who represented Canada at international competitions.

Born in Hamilton, Ontario, Prior first became interested in weightlifting at the age of 15, after reading about the lifting performance of a local resident in a newspaper. His father built a gym in their house's basement, and Prior won multiple events at the CANUSA Games. Three times – in 1970, 1974, and 1978 – Prior won gold medals at the Commonwealth Games, along with those titles, he earned three Pan American Games gold medals. After not being able to compete at the 1972 Summer Olympics due to a back injury, he won the bronze medal in the 110 kg snatch at the 1976 World Weightlifting Championships, lifting 167.5 kg. He participated at the 1976 Summer Olympics in the 110 kg event, and is credited with a ninth-place finish. In 1978, Prior became the Commonwealth record-holder in the 110+ kg clean and jerk, by successfully lifting 210.5 kg. Prior retired from the sport and moved to Winnipeg, where he became a high school teacher.
