= Wolfgang Hübner =

German weightlifter

Personal information
- Nationality: German
- Born: 2 February 1952 (age 74) Chemnitz, Germany

Sport
- Sport: Weightlifting

Wolfgang Hübner (born 2 February 1952) is a German weightlifter. He competed in the men's middleweight event at the 1976 Summer Olympics.
