= János Komjáti =

Hungarian weightlifter

Personal information
- Nationality: Hungarian
- Born: 27 December 1952
- Died: 14 February 1984 (aged 31)

Sport
- Sport: Weightlifting

János Komjáti (27 December 1952 – 14 February 1984) was a Hungarian weightlifter. He competed in the men's middleweight event at the 1976 Summer Olympics.
