= Weightlifting at the 1976 Summer Olympics – Men's 75 kg =

Weightlifting at the Olympics

Men's 75 kg at the Games of the XXI Olympiad
- Venue: St. Michel Arena
- Date: 22 July 1976
- Competitors: 17 from 14 nations
- Winning total: 335.0 kg OR

Medalists
1st place, gold medalist(s)		Yordan Mitkov	Bulgaria
2nd place, silver medalist(s)		Vardan Militosyan	Soviet Union
3rd place, bronze medalist(s)		Peter Wenzel	East Germany

The men's 75 kg weightlifting competitions at the 1976 Summer Olympics in Montreal took place on 22 July at the St. Michel Arena. It was the thirteenth appearance of the middleweight class.

== Results ==
Rank	Name	Country	kg
1	Yordan Mitkov	Bulgaria	335.0
2	Vardan Militosyan	Soviet Union	330.0
3	Peter Wenzel	East Germany	327.5
4	Wolfgang Hübner	East Germany	320.0
5	Arvo Ala-Pöntiö	Finland	315.0
6	András Stark	Hungary	315.0
7	Ondrej Hekel	Czechoslovakia	312.5
8	Daniel Zayas	Cuba	310.0
9	Norbert Bergmann	West Germany	310.0
10	Klaus Groh	West Germany	307.5
11	Fred Lowe	United States	305.0
12	Robert Kabbas	Australia	297.5
13	Mehdi Attar-Ashrafi	Iran	295.0
14	Christian Kinck	France	285.0
15	Muhammad Arshad Malik	Pakistan	282.5
AC	János Komjáti	Hungary	135.0
AC	Dragomir Cioroslan	Romania	320.0 (DQ)
