= Jouni Kailajärvi =

Finnish weightlifter (1938–2003)

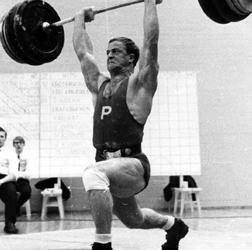

Personal information
- Born: 4 June 1938 Tampere, Finland
- Died: 18 August 2003 (aged 65) Tampere, Finland
- Height: 171 cm (5 ft 7 in)
- Weight: 82–92 kg (181–203 lb)

Sport
- Sport: Weightlifting
Medal record
Representing Finland
European Weightlifting Championships
Bronze medal – third place	1961 Vienna	-82.5 kg
Bronze medal – third place	1962 Budapest	-82.5 kg

Jouni Kalervo Kailajärvi (4 June 1938 – 18 August 2003) was a Finnish light-heavyweight weightlifter who won bronze medals at the European championships in 1961 and 1962. He competed at the 1960, 1964 and 1968 Olympics with the best result of fifth place in 1960. His younger brother Jaakko was also an Olympic weightlifter.
