= Nedelcho Kolev =

Bulgarian weightlifter (born 1953)

Medal record

Men's weightlifting

Representing Bulgaria

Olympic Games
Bronze medal – third place	1980 Moscow	-75 kg

World Championships
Gold medal – first place	1973 Havana	-75 kg
Gold medal – first place	1974 Manila	-75 kg
Silver medal – second place	1979 Thessaloniki	-75 kg
Bronze medal – third place	1975 Moscow	-75 kg
Bronze medal – third place	1980 Moscow	-75 kg

European Championships
Gold medal – first place	1973 Madrid	-75 kg
Gold medal – first place	1974 Verona	-75 kg
Silver medal – second place	1979 Varna	-75 kg
Silver medal – second place	1980 Belgrade	-75 kg
Bronze medal – third place	1975 Moscow	-75 kg

Bulgarian Championships
Gold medal – first place	1977 Yambol	-75 kg
Silver medal – second place	1972 Sofia	-75 kg
Silver medal – second place	1974 Vidin	-75 kg
Silver medal – second place	1979 Sofia	-75 kg

Bulgarian Junior&Youth Championships
Gold medal – first place	1970 Shumen	-67,5 k
Gold medal – first place	1971 Plovdiv	-67,5 kg
Silver medal – second place	1969 Asenovgrad	-60 kg
Bronze medal – third place	1968 Burgas	-56 kg

Nedelcho Lazarov Kolev (Bulgarian: Неделчо Лазаров Колев, born 26 March 1953 in Kableshkovo) is a Bulgarian Olympic, European and World Weightlifting Champion. He had success at the 1980 Summer Olympics in Moscow and won 6 gold medals at the world championships in Manila and Havana, Cuba. He has worked as chief coach for the national teams of Bulgaria, Bahrain, India, Thailand and Indonesia. From 1965 to 1980 he competed only for CSKA Sofia club. His coaches were Angel Akrabov and Zdravko Koev. In the national team of Bulgaria was trained by Ivan Abadzhiev. Kolev has won a total of 29 medals from the Olympic Games, World and European Championships in total, snatch and clean and jerk - 11 gold, 11 silver and 7 bronze. He has set 16 world records - 11 for men and 5 for juniors. He was named Sportsperson of the Year of Bulgaria for 1973.

Kolev is the father of singer Ruth Koleva.

Kolev is former president of the Bulgarian weightlifting federation.
