= Valery Ustyuzhin =

Soviet weightlifter (1945–2010)

Personal information
- Born: 1945 Rivne, Ukraine
- Died: 2 September 2010 (aged 65)

Sport
- Sport: Weightlifting
- Club: Dynamo
Medal record
Representing the Soviet Union
World Weightlifting Championships
Gold medal – first place	1974 Manila	Heavyweight
European Weightlifting Championships
Gold medal – first place	1974 Verona	Heavyweight

Valery Ustyuzhin (Russian: Валерий Устюжин, 1945 – 2 September 2010) was a Soviet heavyweight weightlifter. In 1974, he won the Soviet, European and world titles. He set two world records in the Clean and Jerk, in both 1973 and 1974.
