= Ferenc Hornyák =

Hungarian weightlifter

Personal information
- Nationality: Hungarian
- Born: 25 July 1957 (age 68) Tiszafüred, Hungary

Sport
- Sport: Weightlifting

Ferenc Hornyák (born 25 July 1957) is a Hungarian weightlifter. He competed in the men's flyweight event at the 1980 Summer Olympics.
