= Davoud Maleki =

Iranian weightlifter

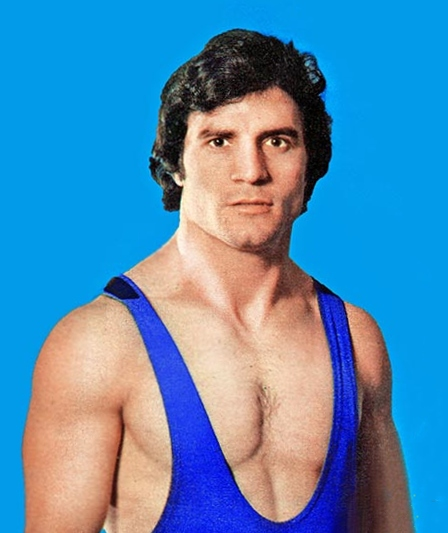

Personal information
- Born: 26 December 1952 (age 73) Zanjan, Iran
- Height: 162 cm (5 ft 4 in)

Sport
- Sport: Weightlifting

Davoud Ali Maleki (Persian: داوود على ملكى; born 26 December 1952) is a retired Iranian featherweight weightlifter. He placed fourth at the 1974 World Weightlifting Championships and sixth at the 1976 Summer Olympics.

Maleki was a third son in a family of four brothers and two sisters.
