= Jan Łostowski =

Polish weightlifter

Personal information
- Nationality: Polish
- Born: 13 January 1951; Wrocław, Poland
- Died: 12 November 2009 (aged 58); Wrocław, Poland

Sport
- Sport: Weightlifting

Jan Łostowski (13 January 1951 – 12 November 2009) was a Polish weightlifter. He competed in the men's featherweight event at the 1976 Summer Olympics.
