= Walter Legel =

Austrian weightlifter (1940–1999)

Personal information
- Nationality: Austrian
- Born: 29 June 1940; Bruck an der Leitha, Austria
- Died: 4 July 1999 (aged 59); Deutsch-Wagram, Austria

Sport
- Sport: Weightlifting

Walter Legel (29 June 1940 – 4 July 1999) was an Austrian weightlifter. He competed at the 1960, 1972, 1976 and the 1980 Summer Olympics.
