= Juhani Avellan =

Finnish weightlifter (1945–2004)

Personal information
- Full name: Juhani Kari Kalervo Avellan
- Born: 13 December 1945 Riihimäki, Finland
- Died: 28 July 2004 (aged 58) Helsinki, Finland
- Height: 171 cm (5 ft 7 in)
- Weight: 75–85 kg (165–187 lb)

Sport
- Country: Finland
- Sport: Weightlifting
- Weight class: 82.5 kg
- Team: National team
Medal record
Men's Weightlifting
Representing Finland
World Championships
Bronze medal – third place	1975 Moscow	82.5 kg
- Updated on 6 October 2016

Juhani Kari Kalervo Avellan (13 December 1945 in Riihimäki – 28 July 2004 in Helsinki) was a Finnish male weightlifter, who competed in the light heavyweight class and represented Finland at international competitions. He won the bronze medal at the 1975 World Weightlifting Championships in the 82.5 kg category. He participated at the 1972 Summer Olympics in the 82.5 kg event, at the 1976 Summer Olympics in the 82.5 kg event and at the 1980 Summer Olympics in the 82.5 kg event. He won the bronze medal at the 1975 European Championships in the Light-Heavyweight class (350.0 kg). He set three light-heavyweight world records in 1970-71 – one in the snatch and one in the clean & jerk.
