= Todor Todorov (weightlifter) =

Bulgarian weightlifter

Personal information
- Nationality: Bulgarian
- Born: 28 January 1948 (age 77)

Sport
- Sport: Weightlifting

Todor Todorov (Bulgarian: Тодор Тодоров, born 28 January 1948) is a Bulgarian weightlifter. He competed in the men's featherweight event at the 1976 Summer Olympics.
