= Vasily Mazheikov =

Soviet weightlifter

Personal information
- Born: 1948 (age 77–78)

Sport
- Sport: Weightlifting
Medal record
Representing the Soviet Union
World Championships
Silver medal – second place	1975 Moscow	-110 kg

Vasily Mazheikov (Russian: Василий Мажейков, born 1948) is a retired Soviet heavyweight weightlifter. In 1975 he won the Soviet title and placed second at the world and European championships.
