= Waldemar Korcz =

Polish weightlifter (born 1949)

Personal information
- Nationality: Polish
- Born: 19 January 1949 (age 76); Elbląg, Poland

Sport
- Sport: Weightlifting

Waldemar Korcz (born 19 January 1949) is a Polish weightlifter. He competed in the men's flyweight event at the 1972 Summer Olympics.
