= Takashi Saito (weightlifter) =

Japanese weightlifter (born 1953)

Personal information
- Nationality: Japanese
- Born: 28 January 1953 (age 72)

Sport
- Sport: Weightlifting

Takashi Saito (斎藤 隆, Saitō Takashi; born 28 January 1953) is a Japanese weightlifter. He competed in the men's featherweight event at the 1976 Summer Olympics.
