= Jiro Hosotani =

Japanese weightlifter

Personal information
- Nationality: Japanese
- Born: 6 January 1950 (age 75)

Sport
- Sport: Weightlifting

Jiro Hosotani (細谷 治朗, Hosotani Jirō, born 6 January 1950) is a Japanese former weightlifter. He competed in the men's bantamweight event at the 1976 Summer Olympics.
