= Lee James (weightlifter) =

American weightlifter (1953–2023)

Lee Roy James (October 31, 1953 – February 11, 2023) was an American Olympic weightlifter.

On February 18, 2023, it was announced that James had died at the age of 69.

== Weightlifting achievements ==
- Silver Medalist Olympic Games (1976)
- Silver Medalist Senior World Championships (1976)
- Senior American record holder in snatch (1972-1992)
- Senior National Champion (1976 and 1978)
