= János Sólyomvári =

Hungarian weightlifter

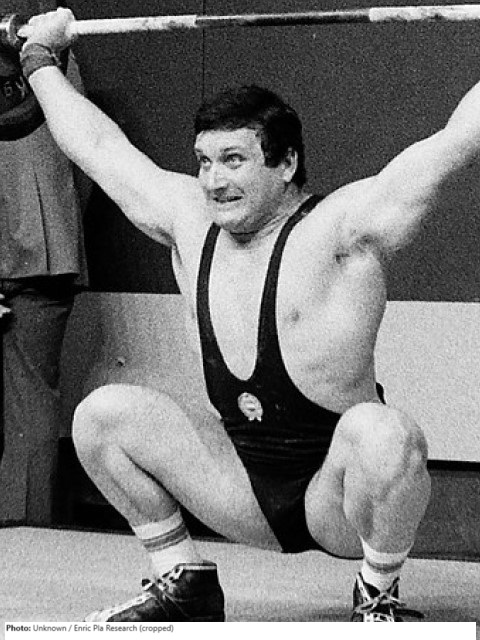

Personal information
- Nationality: Hungarian
- Born: 7 December 1953; Szőny, Hungary
- Died: 12 June 2006 (aged 52); Komárom, Hungary

Sport
- Sport: Weightlifting

János Sólyomvári (7 December 1953 – 12 June 2006) was a Hungarian weightlifter. He competed in the men's heavyweight I event at the 1980 Summer Olympics.
