= Krastyu Semerdzhiev =

Bulgarian weightlifter (born 1954)

Olympic medal record

Men's weightlifting

Representing Bulgaria
Silver medal – second place	1976 Montreal	heavyweight

Krastyu Semerdzhiev (Bulgarian: Кръстю Семерджиев; born 21 May 1954) is a Bulgarian former weightlifter who competed in the 1976 Summer Olympics.
