= Kazimierz Czarnecki (weightlifter) =

Polish former weightlifter

Olympic medal record

Men's weightlifting

Representing Poland
Bronze medal – third place	1976 Montreal	lightweight

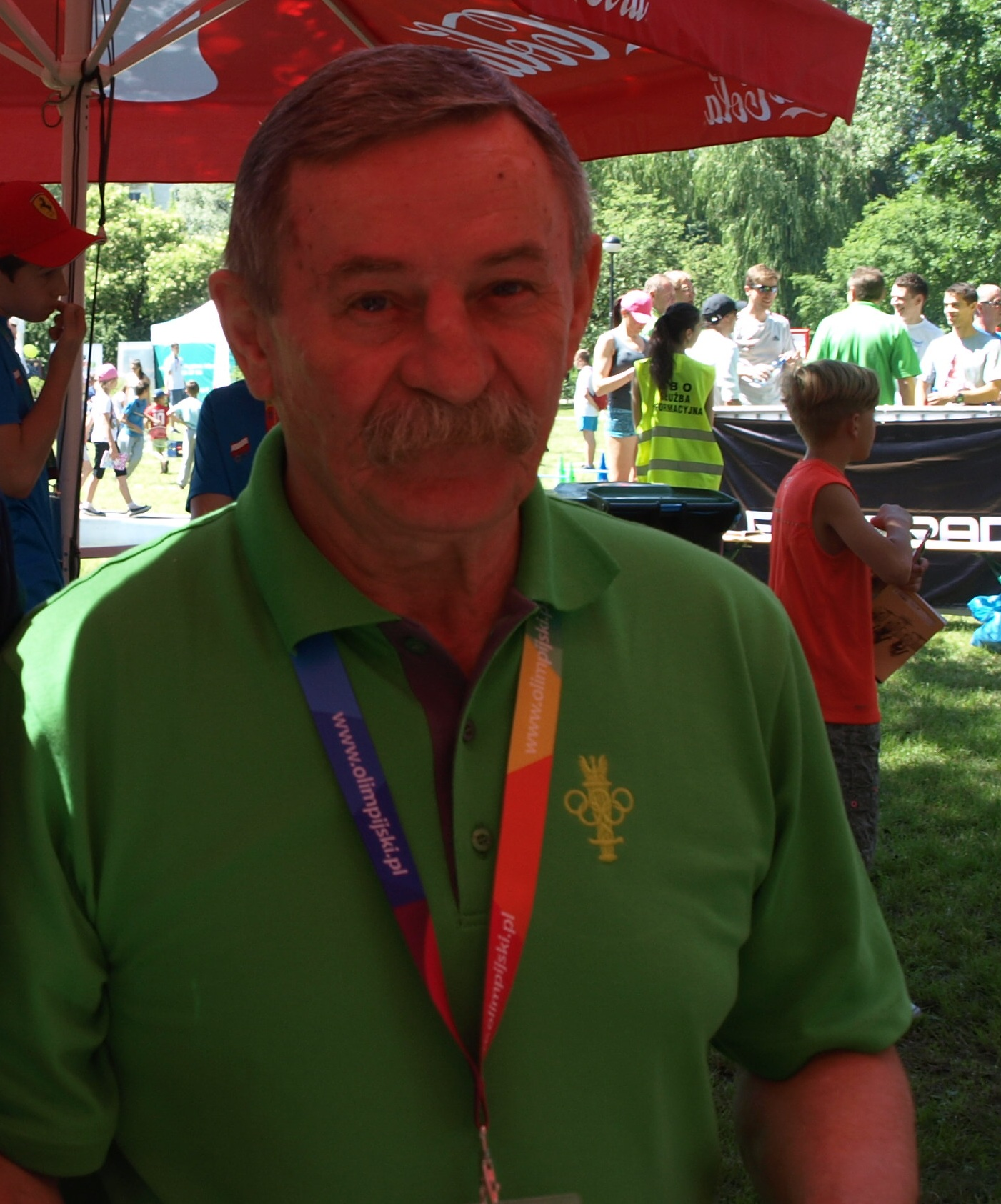

Kazimierz Czarnecki (born 5 March 1948 in Ostróda) is a Polish former weightlifter who competed in the 1976 Summer Olympics.
