= Vasily Alekseyev =

Russian weightlifter (1942–2011)

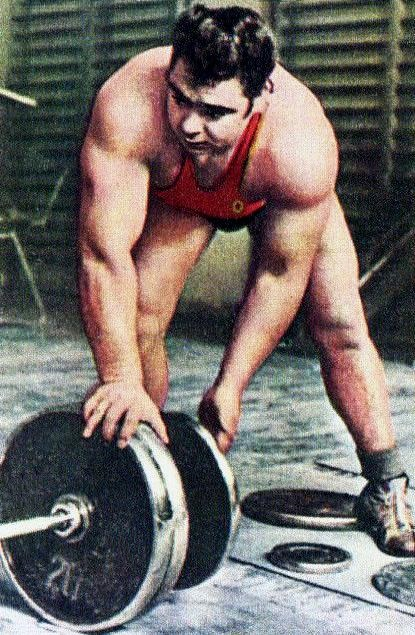
- Alekseyev c. 1970

Personal information
- Full name: Vasily Ivanovich Alekseyev
- Nationality: Russian
- Born: 7 January 1942 Pokrovo-Shishkino, Ryazan Oblast, Russian SFSR, Soviet Union
- Died: 25 November 2011 (aged 69) Badenhausen, Germany
- Height: 1.86 m (6 ft 1 in)
- Weight: 160 kg (353 lb)

Sport
- Country: Soviet Union
- Sport: Olympic weightlifting
- Event: + 110 kg
- Club: Trud Rostov oblast Trud Ryazan
Medal record
Men's weightlifting
Representing the Soviet Union
Olympic Games
Gold medal – first place	1972 Munich	+110 kg
Gold medal – first place	1976 Montreal	+110 kg
World Weightlifting Championships Total
Gold medal – first place	1970 Columbus	+110 kg
Gold medal – first place	1971 Lima	+110 kg
Gold medal – first place	1972 Munich	+110 kg
Gold medal – first place	1973 Havana	+110 kg
Gold medal – first place	1974 Manila	+110 kg
Gold medal – first place	1975 Moscow	+110 kg
Gold medal – first place	1976 Montreal	+110 kg
Gold medal – first place	1977 Stuttgart	+110 kg
European Weightlifting Championships Total
Gold medal – first place	1970 Szombathely	+110 kg
Gold medal – first place	1971 Sofia	+110 kg
Gold medal – first place	1972 Constanţa	+110 kg
Gold medal – first place	1973 Madrid	+110 kg
Gold medal – first place	1974 Verona	+110 kg
Gold medal – first place	1975 Moscow	+110 kg
Gold medal – first place	1977 Stuttgart	+110 kg
Gold medal – first place	1978 Havířov	+110 kg
Representing the Trud Sports Society
USSR Weightlifting Championships Total
Bronze medal – third place	1968 Luhansk	+102.5 kg
Gold medal – first place	1970 Vilnius	+110 kg
Gold medal – first place	1971 Moscow	+110 kg
Gold medal – first place	1972 Tallinn	+110 kg
Gold medal – first place	1973 Donetsk	+110 kg
Gold medal – first place	1974 Tbilisi	+110 kg
Gold medal – first place	1975 Vilnius	+110 kg
Gold medal – first place	1976 Karaganda	+110 kg
Summer Spartakiad of the USSR Total
Gold medal – first place	1971 Moscow	+110 kg
Gold medal – first place	1975 Vilnius	+110 kg
Cups of the USSR
Gold medal – first place	1970 Vilnius	+110 kg Clean & Press
Gold medal – first place	1970 Vilnius	+110 kg Snatch
Gold medal – first place	1970 Vilnius	+110 kg Clean & Jerk
Gold medal – first place	1970 Vilnius	+110 kg Total
Gold medal – first place	1972 Sochi	+110 kg Clean & Jerk
Gold medal – first place	1972 Sochi	+110 kg Total
Gold medal – first place	1974 Zaporizhia	+110 kg Snatch
Gold medal – first place	1974 Zaporizhia	+110 kg Clean & Jerk
Gold medal – first place	1974 Zaporizhia	+110 kg Total

Vasily Ivanovich Alekseyev (Russian: Василий Иванович Алексеев; 7 January 1942 – 25 November 2011) was a Russian weightlifter. He set 80 world records and 81 Soviet national records in weightlifting and won Olympic gold medals at the 1972 and 1976 games.

== Biography ==
At the age of 18, Alekseyev began practicing weightlifting at Trud VSS, trained by his coach Rudolf Plyukfelder until 1968, when he began to train solo. He was not a naturally large man like other super heavyweights but was encouraged to gain strength by adding weight. In January 1970, Alekseyev set his first world record, and during the 1970 World Weightlifting Championship in Columbus, he was the first man to clean and jerk 500 pounds (227 kg) in competition. During one of his early world records, Oscar State OBE remarked that the weight of over 460 pounds (209 kg) in the Olympic press looked so easy it could have been a broomstick. This was the beginning of a series of 80 world records Alekseyev set between 1970 and 1977. He received bonus funds by the Soviet government every time he set a world record (Soviet athletics were funded by the state), so he made it a point to gradually increase his world records by 1.1 pounds or 0.5 kg. He was unbeaten and held the World Championship and European Championship titles for those eight years. He was the first man to total over 600 kg in the triple event.

Alekseyev's performance in the Moscow Olympics of 1980 was a disappointment. He had by then become more of a recluse, training by himself without a coach. In the snatch he set his opening weight too high and was unable to lift it, scoring zero kilograms as the result. He retired from weightlifting after the Moscow Olympics.

In 1987, Alekseyev was elected to represent the Ryazan District for the Soviet Union's Congress of People's Deputies. Alekseyev worked as a coach between 1990 and 1992. Under his leadership, the Unified Team earned ten medals in weightlifting at the 1992 Summer Olympics, including five golds.

From 1966 Alekseyev lived in Shakhty, where in 1971 he graduated from the branch of the Novocherkassk Polytechnical Institute. He died on 25 November 2011 in Germany in a clinic where he had been sent for serious heart problems. He was 69. The Russian Weightlifting Federation reported his death and called him a "Soviet sports legend" and "one of the strongest people in the world". He was survived by wife Olimpiada and sons Sergey and Dmitry. Dmitry competed nationally in weightlifting, placing fourth at the 1988 Soviet weightlifting championships.

== Legacy and awards ==
Vladimir Vysotsky devoted his "Song about weightlifter" (Russian: Песня о штангисте, 1971) to Alekseyev.

Alekseyev was featured on the cover of Sports Illustrated 14 April 1975, titled "World's Strongest Man." In 1999, in Greece, Alekseyev was acknowledged as the best sportsman of the 20th century. He was also awarded: Order of Lenin (1972), Order of Friendship of Peoples, Order of the Badge of Honour (1970), and Order of the Red Banner of Labour (1972). In 1993, he was elected a member of the International Weightlifting Federation Hall of Fame.

In Shakhty, where he lived much of his life, there is a street and park named after him, as well as his monument installed in 2014.

=== Career-bests ===
- Snatch: 190.0 kg (419 lbs) on 1 September 1977 in Podolsk;
- Clean and press: 236.5 kg (521 lbs) on 15 April 1972 in Tallinn;
- Clean and jerk: 256.0 kg (564 lbs) on 1 November 1977 in Moscow;
- Total: 645.0 kg (clean and press+snatch+clean and jerk), on 15 April 1972 in Tallinn, the official world record total in 1972;
- Total: 445.0 kg (snatch + clean and jerk) in Podolsk.

World records
- 24 January 1970 Clean & Press 210.5 kg (464lb) Super Heavyweight Velikie Luki
- 24 January 1970 Clean & Jerk 221.5 kg Super Heavyweight Velikie Luki
- 24 January 1970 Total (3) 592.5 kg Super Heavyweight Velikie Luki
- 24 January 1970 Total (3) 595 kg Super Heavyweight Velikie Luki
- 18 March 1970 Clean & Press 213 kg (469.5lb) Super Heavyweight Minsk
- 18 March 1970 Total (3) 600 kg Super Heavyweight Minsk
- 26 April 1970 Clean & Press 216 kg (476lb) Super Heavyweight Vilnius
- 26 April 1970 Clean & Jerk 223.5 kg Super Heavyweight Vilnius
- 26 April 1970 Total (3) 602.5 kg Super Heavyweight Vilnius
- 26 April 1970 Total (3) 607.5 kg Super Heavyweight Vilnius
- 28 June 1970 Clean & Press 219.5 kg (483.9lb) Super Heavyweight Szombathely
- 28 June 1970 Clean & Jerk 225.5 kg Super Heavyweight Szombathely
- 28 June 1970 Total (3) 610 kg Super Heavyweight Szombathely
- 28 June 1970 Total (3) 612.5 kg Super Heavyweight Szombathely
- 20 September 1970 Clean & Jerk 227.5 kg Super Heavyweight Columbus
- 17 November 1970 Clean & Press 220.5 kg (486lb) Super Heavyweight Volgograd
- 17 November 1970 Clean & Jerk 228 kg Super Heavyweight Volgograd
- 12/4/1970 Snatch 177 kg Super Heavyweight Shakhty
- 12/4/1970 Clean & Press 221 kg (487.2lb) Super Heavyweight Shakhty
- 12/4/1970 Clean & Jerk 228.5 kg Super Heavyweight Shakhty
- 12/4/1970 Total (3) 615 kg Super Heavyweight Shakhty
- 12/4/1970 Total (3) 620 kg Super Heavyweight Shakhty
- 26 December 1970 Clean & Press 222 kg (489.4lb) Super Heavyweight Dnipropetrovsk
- 26 December 1970 Clean & Jerk 229.5 kg Super Heavyweight Dnipropetrovsk
- 26 December 1970 Total (3) 622.5 kg Super Heavyweight Dnipropetrovsk
- 26 December 1970 Total (3) 625 kg Super Heavyweight Dnipropetrovsk
- 14 February 1971 Snatch 177.5 kg Super Heavyweight Paris
- 14 February 1971 Clean & Press 222.5 kg (490.5lb) Super Heavyweight Paris
- 14 February 1971 Clean & Jerk 230 kg Super Heavyweight Paris
- 26 March 1971 Clean & Press 223 kg (491.6lb) Super Heavyweight Wienn
- 4/7/1971 Clean & Press 223.5 kg (492.7lb) Super Heavyweight Moscow
- 18 April 1971 Clean & Jerk 230.5 kg Super Heavyweight Taganrog
- 27 June 1971 Clean & Press 225 kg (496lb) Super Heavyweight Sofia
- 27 June 1971 Clean & Jerk 231 kg Super Heavyweight Sofia
- 27 June 1971 Clean & Jerk 232.5 kg Super Heavyweight Sofia
- 27 June 1971 Total (3) 627.5 kg Super Heavyweight Sofia
- 27 June 1971 Total (3) 630 kg Super Heavyweight Sofia
- 24 July 1971 Snatch 180 kg Super Heavyweight Moscow
- 24 July 1971 Clean & Press 225.5 kg (497.1lb) Super Heavyweight Moscow
- 24 July 1971 Clean & Jerk 233 kg Super Heavyweight Moscow
- 24 July 1971 Clean & Jerk 235 kg Super Heavyweight Moscow
- 24 July 1971 Total (3) 632.5 kg Super Heavyweight Moscow
- 24 July 1971 Total (3) 637.5 kg Super Heavyweight Moscow
- 24 July 1971 Total (3) 640 kg Super Heavyweight Moscow
- 26 September 1971 Clean & Press 227 kg (500lb) Super Heavyweight Lima
- 26 September 1971 Clean & Press 230 kg (507lb) Super Heavyweight Lima
- 26 September 1971 Clean & Jerk 235.5 kg Super Heavyweight Lima
- 19 March 1972 Clean & Press 231.5 kg (510.3lb) Super Heavyweight Bollnas
- 19 March 1972 Clean & Press 235.5 kg (519.1lb) Super Heavyweight Bollnas
- 15 April 1972 Clean & Jerk 236 kg Super Heavyweight Tallinn
- 15 April 1972 Clean & Press 236.5 kg (521.3lb) Super Heavyweight Tallinn
- 15 April 1972 Clean & Jerk 237.5 kg Super Heavyweight Tallinn
- 15 April 1972 Total (3) 642.5 kg Super Heavyweight Tallinn
- 15 April 1972 Total (3) 645 kg Super Heavyweight Tallinn
- 29 April 1972 Clean & Jerk 238 kg Super Heavyweight Donetsk
- 18 June 1973 Clean & Jerk 240 kg Super Heavyweight Madrid
- 18 June 1973 Total 417.5 kg Super Heavyweight Madrid
- 1/3/1974 Clean & Jerk 242 kg Super Heavyweight Glazov
- 20 March 1974 Clean & Jerk 240.5 kg Super Heavyweight Erevan
- 28 April 1974 Clean & Jerk 241 kg Super Heavyweight Tbilisi
- 28 April 1974 Total 420 kg Super Heavyweight Tbilisi
- 6 June 1974 Snatch 187.5 kg Super Heavyweight Verona
- 6 June 1974 Total 422.5 kg Super Heavyweight Verona
- 23 September 1974 Clean & Jerk 245.5 kg Super Heavyweight Moscow
- 29 September 1974 Clean & Jerk 241.5 kg Super Heavyweight Manila
- 29 September 1974 Total 425 kg Super Heavyweight Manila
- 27 November 1974 Clean & Jerk 242.5 kg Super Heavyweight London
- 14 December 1974 Clean & Jerk 243 kg Super Heavyweight Zaporizhia
- 29 December 1974 Clean & Jerk 243.5 kg Super Heavyweight Lipetsk
- 7/11/1975 Clean & Jerk 245 kg Super Heavyweight Vilnius
- 23 September 1975 Total 427.5 kg Super Heavyweight Moscow
- 11 November 1975 Clean and Jerk 246 kg Super Heavyweight Arkhangelsk
- 11 November 1975 Total 430 kg Super Heavyweight Arkhangelsk
- 12/7/1975 Clean & Jerk 247.5 kg Super Heavyweight Montreal
- 15 May 1976 Total 435 kg Super Heavyweight Karaganda
- 27 July 1976 Clean & Jerk 255 kg Super Heavyweight Montreal
- 9/1/1977 Clean & Jerk 255.5 kg Super Heavyweight Podolsk
- 9/1/1977 Total 445 kg Super Heavyweight Podolsk
- 11/1/1977 Clean & Jerk 256 kg Super Heavyweight Moscow

Olympic Games
Preceded by Aleksandr Medved	Flagbearer for Soviet Union (opening ceremony); Montreal 1976 (with Ivan Yarygin)	Succeeded by Nikolay Balboshin
