= Sergey Poltoratsky =

Soviet weightlifter (born 1947)

Personal information
- Born: 27 October 1947 (age 79) Proskuriv, Ukrainian SSR, Soviet Union
- Height: 170 cm (5 ft 7 in)

Sport
- Sport: Weightlifting
- Club: Soviet Army Kiev
Medal record
Representing the Soviet Union
World Championships
Silver medal – second place	1974 Manila	90 kg
Silver medal – second place	1975 Moscow	90 kg
Gold medal – first place	1977 Stuttgart	90 kg

Sergey Aleksandrovich Poltoratsky (Russian: Сергей Александрович Полторацкий, Ukrainian: Сергій Олександрович Полторацький, born 27 October 1947) is a retired Soviet heavyweight weightlifter. He won a world title in 1977, placing second in 1974 and 1975, and set two ratified world records, in 1970 and 1980. He competed at the 1976 Summer Olympics, but failed to complete the snatch event.
