= Imre Stefanovics =

Hungarian weightlifter (born 1954)

Personal information
- Nationality: Hungarian
- Born: 31 October 1954 (age 70); Enying, Hungary
- Died: 30.06.2020

Sport
- Sport: Weightlifting

Imre Stefanovics (born 31 October 1954) is a Hungarian weightlifter. He competed at the 1976 Summer Olympics and the 1980 Summer Olympics.
