= Norbert Bergmann =

German weightlifter

Personal information
- Nationality: German
- Born: 1 May 1954 (age 70); Essen, Germany

Sport
- Sport: Weightlifting

Norbert Bergmann (born 1 May 1954) is a German weightlifter. He competed in the men's middleweight event at the 1976 Summer Olympics.
