= Günter Ambraß =

German weightlifter

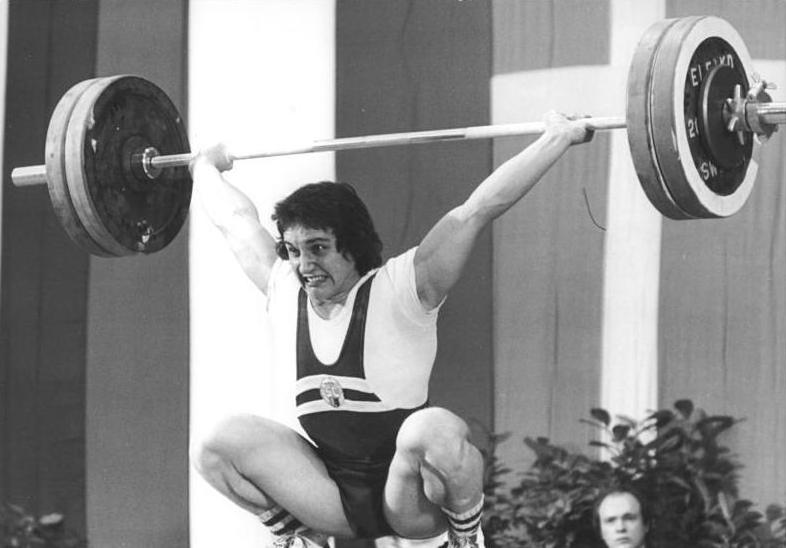
- Günter Ambraß in 1977

Personal information
- Born: 16 September 1955 (age 70) Karl-Marx-Stadt, East Germany
- Height: 1.62 m (5 ft 4 in)
- Weight: 69 kg (152 lb)

Sport
- Sport: Weightlifting
- Club: SC Karl-Marx-Stadt
Medal record
Representing East Germany
World Championships
Bronze medal – third place	1978 Gettysburg	Lightweight, 130+170 kg
European Championships
Bronze medal – third place	1979 Varna	Lightweight, 137.5+175 kg
Silver medal – second place	1980 Belgrad	Lightweight, 140+175 kg

Günter Ambraß (born 16 September 1955) is a retired East German weightlifter who competed in the lightweight category. He won one silver and two bronze medals at three world and European championships in 1978, 1979 and 1980. He finished in fourth and fifth place at the 1976 and 1980 Summer Olympics.
