= Rudolf Strejček =

Czech weightlifter

Personal information
- Nationality: Czech
- Born: 30 November 1950 (age 75) Ohrazenice, Czechoslovakia

Sport
- Sport: Weightlifting

Rudolf Strejček (born 30 November 1950) is a Czech weightlifter. He competed at the 1972 Summer Olympics, the 1976 Summer Olympics and the 1980 Summer Olympics.
