= Vardan Militosyan =

Soviet weightlifter (1950–2015)

Medal record

Men's Weightlifting

Representing Soviet Union

Olympic Games
Silver medal – second place	1976 Montreal	-75 kg

World Championships
Silver medal – second place	1976 Montreal	-75 kg
Silver medal – second place	1978 Gettysburg	-75 kg

European Championships
Gold medal – first place	1976 Berlin	-75 kg
Gold medal – first place	1978 Havířov	-75 kg

USSR Weightlifting Championships
Bronze medal – third place	1975 Vilnius	-75 kg
Silver medal – second place	1979 Leningrad	-75 kg

Vardan Militosyan (Armenian: Վարդան Միլիտոսյան, 8 June 1950 – 29 April 2015) was a Soviet Armenian former weightlifter. He was awarded the Honoured Master of Sports of the USSR title in 1976.

== Early life ==
Born in Leninakan, Armenian SSR (now Gyumri, Armenia), a city famous for its world class weightlifters, Militosyan took up weightlifting in 1964 under the guidance of Hakob Faradzhyana and joined the Soviet national team in 1975.

== Career ==
A year after joining the Soviet weightlifting team, Militosyan won a gold medal at the 1976 European Weightlifting Championships and a silver medal at the 1976 World Weightlifting Championships. Militosyan repeated his success in 1978, becoming a two-time European Champion. The Soviet team chose Militosyan to compete at the 1976 Summer Olympics, where he won an Olympic silver medal. Militosyan became the first weightlifter from Armenia to win an Olympic medal. He left the Soviet national team in 1979. Militosyan set four world records during his career, all in the clean and jerk.

In 1980, Militosyan completed his weightlifting career after he was not selected to join the Soviet team at the 1980 Summer Olympics. He went on to work as a weightlifting coach in his native Armenia.

Militosyan died on 29 April 2015 after prolonged illness.

== Personal life ==
Militosyan was a cousin and teacher of fellow Soviet-Armenian Olympic weightlifting medalist Israel Militosyan. Ironically, Vardan was the first Soviet-Armenian to win an Olympic medal in weightlifting, and Israel was the last.

In 1991, he married Nune Ayvazyan. The couple had two daughters: Maria Militosyan (November 23, 1992) and Suzanna Militosyan (February 6, 1995). Sister: Alvard Militosyan (February 27, 1953).
