= Plamen Asparukhov =

Bulgarian weightlifter

Personal information
- Nationality: Bulgarian
- Born: 8 May 1960 (age 64); Pernik, Bulgaria

Sport
- Sport: Weightlifting

Plamen Asparukhov (born 8 May 1960) is a Bulgarian weightlifter. He competed in the men's heavyweight I event at the 1980 Summer Olympics.
