= Zygmunt Smalcerz =

Polish weightlifter (born 1941)

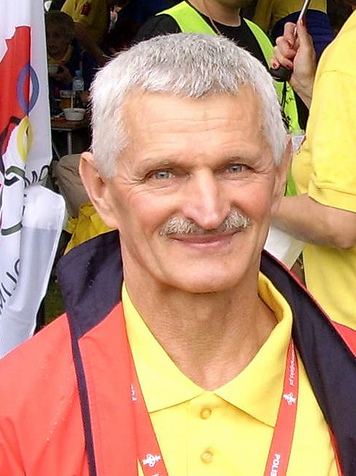
- Zygmunt Smalcerz in 2007

Personal information
- Born: 8 June 1941 (age 85) Bestwinka, Province of Upper Silesia, Germany
- Height: 1.53 m (5 ft 0 in)
- Weight: 52 kg (115 lb)

Sport
- Sport: Weightlifting
- Club: AZS Warszawa; Legia Warszawa
Medal record
Representing Poland
Olympic Games
Gold medal – first place	1972 Munich	-52 kg
World Weightlifting Championships
Gold medal – first place	1971 Lima	-52 kg
Gold medal – first place	1972 Munich	-52 kg
Gold medal – first place	1975 Moscow	-52 kg
Bronze medal – third place	1973 Havana	-52 kg

Zygmunt Antoni Smalcerz (born 8 June 1941) is a retired Polish weightlifter who won the gold medal in the flyweight class at the 1972 Olympics. He also competed at the 1976 Games but had to withdraw due to injury.

In 2002 he was elected member of the International Weightlifting Federation Hall of Fame.

He was the head coach of the Polish weightlifting team for the run-up and including the 2008 Beijing Olympics.

From 2010 through 2017, he was the resident weightlifting coach at the United States Olympic Training Center in Colorado Springs.

As of 2020, he works as the head coach of the Norwegian Weightlifting Federation.
