= Antoni Pawlak =

Polish weightlifter (born 1951)

Personal information
- Nationality: Polish
- Born: 13 June 1951 (age 73); Łódź, Poland

Sport
- Sport: Weightlifting

Antoni Pawlak (born 13 June 1951) is a Polish weightlifter. He competed at the 1976 Summer Olympics and the 1980 Summer Olympics.
