= Karel Prohl =

Czech weightlifter (born 1947)

Personal information
- Nationality: Czech
- Born: 24 December 1947 (age 77); Loket, Czechoslovakia

Sport
- Sport: Weightlifting

Karel Prohl (born 24 December 1947) is a Czech weightlifter.

== Professional career ==
He competed in the men's bantamweight event at the 1976 Summer Olympics.
