= David Rigert =

Soviet and Russian weightlifter (1947–2026)

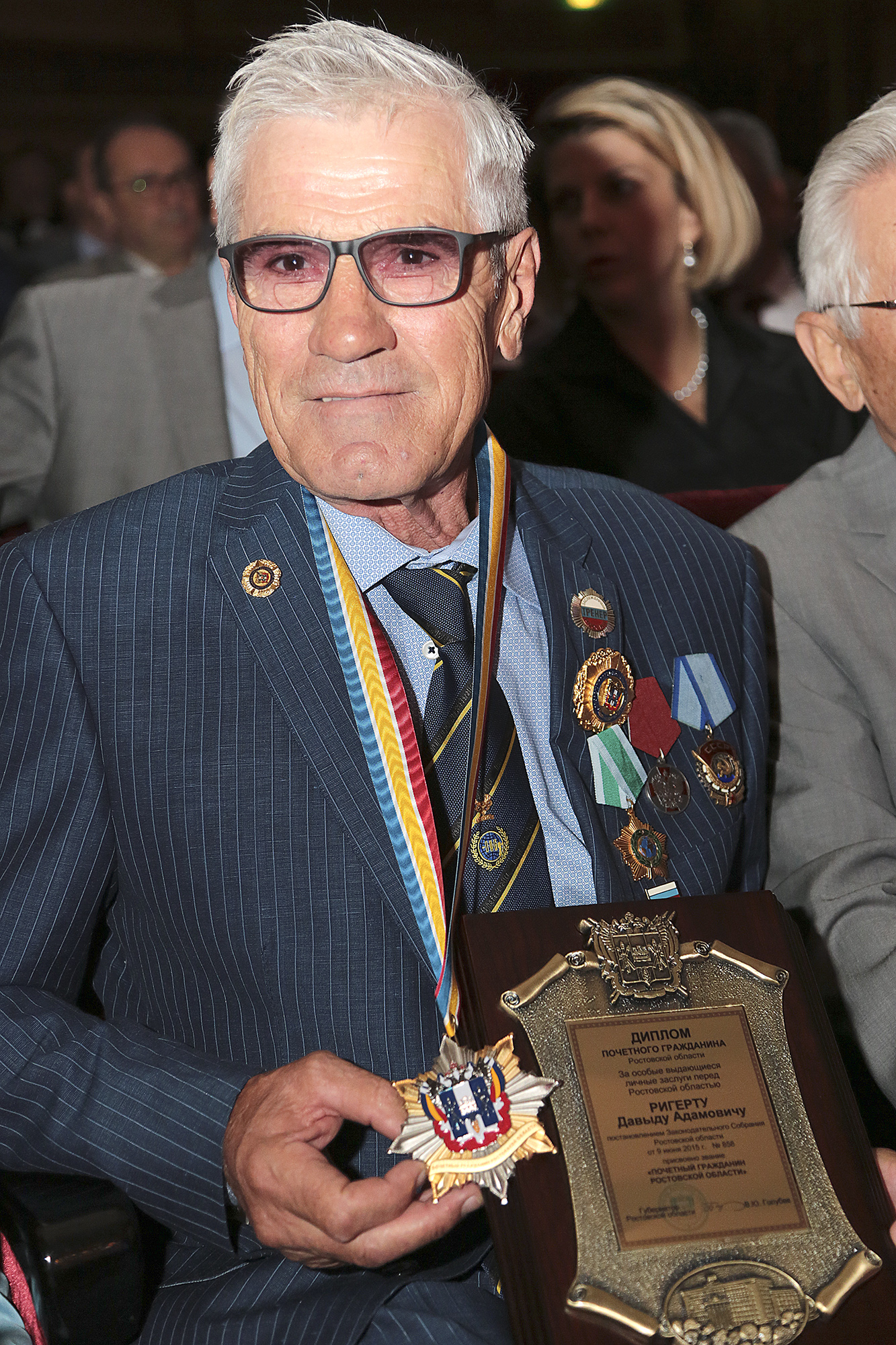
- Rigert at an awards ceremony in 2015

Personal information
- Full name: David Adamovich Rigert
- Born: 12 March 1947 Nagornoye, Kokchetav Oblast, Kazakh SSR, Soviet Union
- Died: 26 October 2026 (aged 79) Rostov Oblast, Russia
- Height: 172 cm (5 ft 8 in)

Sport
- Sport: Weightlifting
- Club: Trud Shakhty; Avangard Dnepropetrovsk
- Coached by: Rudolf Plyukfelder
Medal record
Representing Soviet Union
Gold medal – first place	1976 Montreal	– 90 kg
World Championships
Gold medal – first place	1971 Lima	– 90 kg
Gold medal – first place	1973 Havana	– 90 kg
Gold medal – first place	1974 Manila	– 90 kg
Gold medal – first place	1975 Moscow	– 90 kg
Gold medal – first place	1976 Montreal	– 90 kg
Gold medal – first place	1978 Gettysburg, Pennsylvania	– 100 kg
Bronze medal – third place	1970 Columbus, Ohio	– 82.5 kg

David Adamovich Rigert (Russian: Давид Адамович Ригерт; 12 March 1947 – 26 October 2026) was a Soviet and Russian weightlifter and weightlifting coach of German descent. During his career, he competed for the Soviet Union; he set 63 world records and 64 Soviet records. He won a gold medal at the 1976 Summer Olympics and six world titles. After retiring, he was head coach of the Soviet and Russian national teams.

In 1999, he was inducted to the International Weightlifting Federation Hall of Fame.

== Early life ==
Rigert was born on 12 March 1947 in the village of Nagornoye. He was a son of Adam Adamovich Rigert and Yelizaveta Rudolfovna Gorn, both of Russian-German descent.

Rigert's ancestors arrived in Russia in 1740. His grandfather, Adam Rigert, worked at the estate of Baron Rudolf Horn, an officer of the emperor. Baron Horn's daughter, Lisbeth, married Adam Rigert's son Adam.

During World War II, his father was brought to the Ural Mountains as a forced laborer, together with other Russians of German ancestry, and his mother and children were brought to northern Kazakhstan. David and his eight siblings returned to their residence in the Kuban region, located near the Caucasus. He spent his youth there.

He initially trained as a boxer, but then, motivated by the Yury Vlasov's victory at the 1960 Summer Olympics, changed to weightlifting. After serving in the Soviet Army, he moved to Shakhty to train with Rudolf Plyukfelder at his invitation. He had met him at a competition in Sverdlovsk. In Shakhty, Rigert worked in a coal mine.

== Career ==
Rigert began practicing weightlifting on his own in 1966, using the training methods of former Soviet weightlifting champion Arkady Vorobyov. Two years later, while serving in the Soviet Army, Rigert earned the title Master of Sports of the USSR. After demobilization he lived and trained in Armavir. In 1969, he met the famous Soviet coach Rudolf Plyukfelder, who invited him to Shakhty, where Rigert began training at Trud Voluntary Sports Society under Plyukfelder. Just 11 months later, in 1970, Rigert was included into the Soviet national team and debuted internationally, earning a bronze medal at the world championships. In November 1970, at the RSFSR Championships in Volgograd, Rigert set his first world record, thus began an extraordinary series of 65 weightlifting world records by 1981. It was exceeded only by the fellow super-heavyweight weightlifter Vasily Alekseyev.

After a disappointing performance at the 1972 Summer Olympics, in 1973 Rigert won in all competitions he participated, setting eight world records. He won all world and European championships between 1973 and 1976, and earned a gold medal at the 1976 Summer Olympics. Despite these achievements during his career, his final performance was disappointing: scoring zero at the 1980 Summer Olympics. For those Games, Rigert moved to a lighter bodyweight class, from under 100 kg to under 90 kg. As a result of the rapid weight loss, he tore his leg muscle.

After retiring from competitions, Rigert moved to Rostov-on-Don and later to Taganrog. He coached, studied at the Moscow Institute of Physical Culture, manufactured weights for weightlifting competitions, and built some 100 sport facilities in Taganrog. He also created a weightlifting center in Taganrog and prepared the Russian national team for the 2004 Summer Olympics.

In 2004, Rigert was elected deputy of the Taganrog City Duma, and in March 2009, he was re-elected. He was also an honorary citizen of Taganrog and Rostov Oblast.

He received various state awards, including the Order of the Red Banner of Labour and the Order of Friendship. He was also awarded the titles of Honored Master of Sport of the USSR and Honored Coach of Russia. In 1999, he was inducted into the International Weightlifting Federation Hall of Fame.

== Personal records ==
- Snatch – 185 kg (408 lb) (1981)
- Clean and press – 201 kg (443 lb) (1972)
- Clean and jerk – 230 kg (507 lb) (1980)
- 2 lift Total – 405 kg (893 lb) (1979)
- 3 lift Total – 562.5 kg (1,240 lb) (1972)

== Personal life and death ==
Rigert was married to Nadezhda, a former competitive javelin thrower. Together, they had three sons, all of whom became competitive weightlifters. Rigert was an avid smoker, since the age of 11.

Rigert died on 26 October 2026, at the age of 79, after a long illness. He was en route from Taganrog to Rostov-on-Don when he died.

== See also ==
- List of select Jewish weightlifters
