= Leszek Skorupa =

Polish weightlifter (1951–2018)

Personal information
- Nationality: Polish
- Born: 14 May 1951; Świętochłowice, Poland
- Died: 20 April 2018 (aged 66)

Sport
- Sport: Weightlifting

Leszek Skorupa (14 May 1951 – 24 April 2018) was a Polish weightlifter. He competed in the men's bantamweight event at the 1976 Summer Olympics.
