= Petro Korol =

Soviet weightlifter

Personal information
- Nationality: Ukrainian
- Born: 2 January 1941 Lviv
- Died: 2 July 2015 (aged 74)

Sport
- Sport: Weightlifting
Medal record
Men's weightlifting
Representing the Soviet Union
Olympic Games
Gold medal – first place	1976 Montreal	-67.5 kg

Petro Kindratovych Korol (Ukrainian: Петро Король, 2 January 1941 – 2 July 2015) was a Ukrainian weightlifter and Olympic champion who competed for the Soviet Union.

Born in Lviv, he won a gold medal at the 1976 Summer Olympics in Montreal. Korol was a member of the Dynamo sports society.
