= Peter Petzold =

German weightlifter

Personal information
- Nationality: German
- Born: 1 June 1949 (age 75); Wilsdruff, Germany

Sport
- Sport: Weightlifting

Peter Petzold (born 1 June 1949) is a German former weightlifter. He competed in the men's middle heavyweight event at the 1976 Summer Olympics.
