= Yordan Mitkov =

Bulgarian weightlifter (born 1956)

Medal record

Representing Bulgaria

Men's Weightlifting

Olympic Games
Gold medal – first place	1976 Montreal	-75 kg

Yordan Mitkov (Bulgarian: Йордан Митков, born April 3, 1956) is a former Bulgarian weightlifter. He was born in Asenovgrad.

Mitkov became Olympic champion in 1976 in the middleweight class.
