= Zbigniew Kaczmarek (weightlifter) =

Polish weightlifter (1946–2023)

Olympic medal record

Olympic Games

Men's weightlifting

Representing Poland
Bronze medal – third place	1972 Munich	lightweight
Disqualified	1976 Montreal	lightweight

World Championships
Gold medal – first place	1970 Columbus	Lightweight
Gold medal – first place	1971 Lima	Lightweight

Zbigniew Tadeusz Kaczmarek (31 July 1946 – 15 May 2023) was a Polish weightlifter who competed in the 1972 Summer Olympics, in the 1976 Summer Olympics, and in the 1980 Summer Olympics.

At the 1976 Summer Olympics, the first Olympics to test for anabolic steroids, he won the gold medal but tested positive for said substances and therefore was disqualified for doping. He was stripped of his gold medal and suspended from the current and future Olympic events.

Kaczmarek died on 15 May 2023, at the age of 76.
