= Jürgen Ciezki =

German weightlifter (1952–2021)

Personal information
- Nationality: German
- Born: 27 May 1952; Schwerin, Germany
- Died: 1 September 2021 (aged 69)

Sport
- Sport: Weightlifting

Jürgen Ciezki (27 May 1952 – 1 September 2021) was a German weightlifter. He competed in the men's heavyweight event at the 1976 Summer Olympics.
