= Peter Wenzel (weightlifter) =

German weightlifter (born 1952)

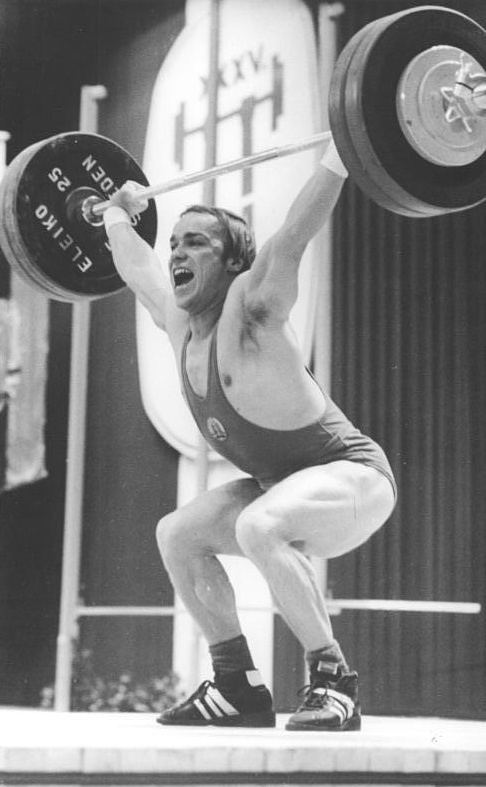
- Peter Wenzel in 1979

Personal information
- Born: 15 April 1952 (age 74) Stroitschen, East Germany
- Height: 1.68 m (5 ft 6 in)
- Weight: 78 kg (172 lb)

Sport
- Sport: Weightlifting
- Club: SC Einheit Dresden
Medal record
Representing East Germany
Olympic Games
Bronze medal – third place	1976 Montreal	Middleweight; 145+182.5 kg
World Championships
Silver medal – second place	1973 Havana	Middleweight, 140+177.5 kg
Bronze medal – third place	1974 Manila	Middleweight, 142.5+180 kg
Gold medal – first place	1975 Moscow	Middleweight, 145+190 kg
Bronze medal – third place	1976 Montreal	Middleweight, 145+182.5 kg
Silver medal – second place	1977 Stuttgart	Middleweight, 150+187.5 kg
Bronze medal – third place	1978 Gettysburg	Middleweight, 145+190 kg
Bronze medal – third place	1979 Thessaloniki	Middleweight, 147.5+190 kg
European Championships
Silver medal – second place	1974 Verona	Middleweight, 145+182.5 kg
Gold medal – first place	1975 Moscow	Middleweight, 145+190 kg
Silver medal – second place	1976 East Berlin	Middleweight, 150+185 kg
Silver medal – second place	1977 Stuttgart	Middleweight, 150+187.5 kg
Bronze medal – third place	1979 Varna	Middleweight, 150+182.5 kg

Peter Wenzel (born 15 April 1952) is a retired East German weightlifter who won a bronze medal in the middleweight category at the 1976 Summer Olympics. Between 1973 and 1979 he won a medal at every world championship, including a gold in 1975.
