= Valentin Hristov (weightlifter, born 1956) =

Bulgarian weightlifter

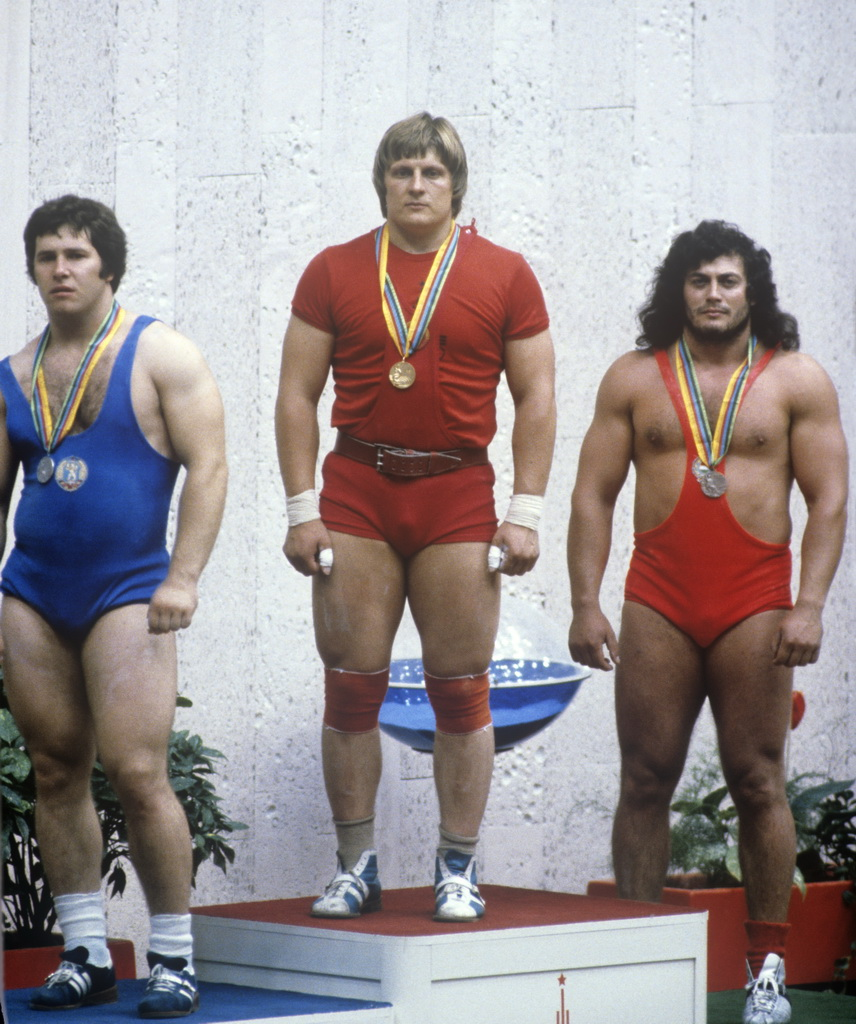
- Hristov (left) at the 1980 Olympics

Personal information
- Born: 16 March 1956 (age 70) Pernik, Bulgaria
- Height: 179 cm (5 ft 10 in)
- Weight: 107 kg (236 lb)

Sport
- Sport: Weightlifting
Medal record
Representing Bulgaria
Men's weightlifting
Olympic Games
Disqualified	1976 Montreal	110 kg
Silver medal – second place	1980 Moscow	110 kg
World championships
Gold medal – first place	1975 Moscow	110 kg
Gold medal – first place	1977 Stuttgart	110 kg
Silver medal – second place	1979 Thessaloniki	110 kg
Silver medal – second place	1980 Moscow	110 kg
European championships
Silver medal – second place	1974 Verona	110 kg
Gold medal – first place	1975 Moscow	110 kg
Gold medal – first place	1976 Berlin	110 kg
Gold medal – first place	1977 Stuttgart	110 kg
Silver medal – second place	1980 Belgrade	110 kg

Valentin Hristov (Bulgarian: Валентин Христов, born 16 March 1956) is a retired Bulgarian heavyweight weightlifter. He is best known for being the first weightlifter to be disqualified from the modern Olympic Games for doping after anabolic steroid testing was introduced at the 1976 Games. He later went on to claim the silver at the 1980 Olympics. Hristov won the world and European titles in 1975 and 1977 and placed second in 1979. In 1975–76 he set nine ratified world records: three in the snatch, four in the clean and jerk and two in the total.

Hristov originally won the gold medal at the 1976 Olympic Games in Montreal for Bulgaria but had the medal stripped and title revoked after testing positive for an undisclosed anabolic steroid. This was before the IOC had banned those who cheated from future Olympic Games by testing positive for the use of PEDs, and the Bulgarian returned to claim the silver medal in 1980.
