= Gerd Bonk =

German weightlifter (1951–2014)

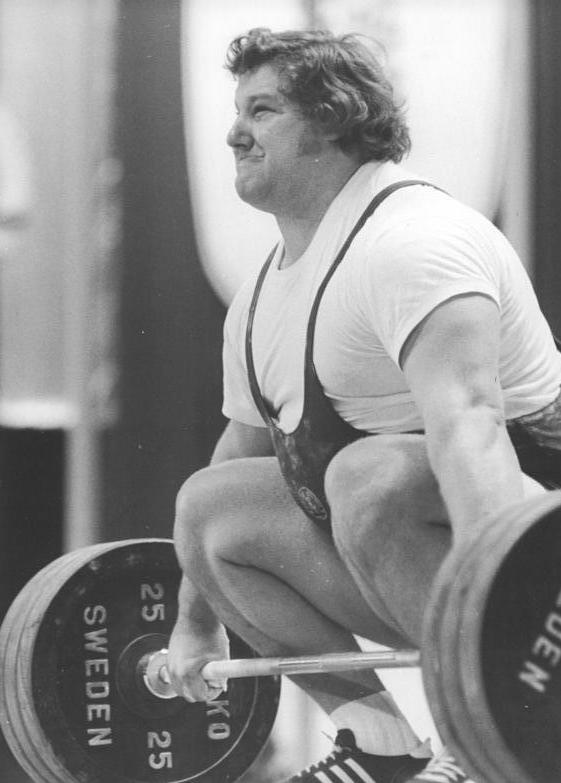
- Gerd Bonk in 1979

Personal information
- Born: 26 August 1951 Limbach, Vogtland, East Germany
- Died: 20 October 2014 (aged 63) Greiz, Germany
- Height: 1.87 m (6.1 ft)
- Weight: 145 kg (320 lb)

Sport
- Sport: Olympic weightlifting
- Turned pro: 1969

Achievements and titles
- Olympic finals: 1976 Silver medal 1972 Bronze medal
Medal record
Representing East Germany
Men's weightlifting
Summer Olympics
Silver medal – second place	1976 Montreal	+110 kg
Bronze medal – third place	1972 Munich	+110 kg
World Championships Total
Silver medal – second place	1975 Moscow	+110 kg
Bronze medal – third place	1978 Gettysburg	+110 kg
Bronze medal – third place	1979 Thessaloniki	+110 kg
European Championships Total
Gold medal – first place	1976 Berlin	+110 kg
Silver medal – second place	1974 Verona	+110 kg
Bronze medal – third place	1978 Havířov	+110 kg

Gerd Bonk (26 August 1951 – 20 October 2014) was an East German weightlifter who was active from 1969 to 1980 who won silver at the 1976 Summer Olympics, bronze at the 1972 Summer Olympics, and set three world records. He was the first man in history to clean and jerk 250 kg (551 lb). He also achieved numerous other top-three placements at World Championships and European Weightlifting Championships. He was also a master mechanic.

== Biography ==
Bonk began his career at BSG Motor Nema Netzschkau as a track and field athlete and set the East German youth record for the shot put in 1967 with 17.82 m. To build up the necessary strength for shot putting, he regularly lifted weights. After participating in weightlifting contests and having greater successes in it than in shot putting, he shifted his focus completely towards weightlifting in 1969 at SC Karl-Marx-Stadt, Chemnitz. His coach was Klaus Kroll, a former top weightlifter of the GDR. In 1971 Bonk became GDR super heavyweight champion (with a bodyweight above 110 kg). During the Baltic-Cup, in Lübeck in the same year, he had his international debut, where he made three failed pressing attempts. Being a top lifter, he was never able to beat Vasiliy Alekseyev from the Soviet Union or Rudolf Mang from Germany up to 1980. His specialty was the clean and jerk, where he set two world records. In 1980 he once more placed third at the European Championships and even lifted 430 kg (180–250) in a smaller competition. Because he was not nominated for the 1980 Olympic Games in Moscow, he stepped back from professional weightlifting.

Bonk lived in Limbach/Vogtland as a pensioner. He was one of the prominent victims of doping in East Germany reporting in 2003 that he had "diabetes, a failing liver and his feet are numb, among a host of signs of a failing body".

In 2002 he was awarded the Georg von Opel Prize for Silent Winners in the category "Special Warriors".

=== World records ===
Bonk set two world records in clean and jerk:

- 246.5 kg (543 lb), 1975 in Karl-Marx-Stadt (Chemnitz)
- 252.5 kg (557 lb), 1976 in Berlin.

=== GDR Championships ===
Bonk was East German champion in 1971, 1973, 1974, 1975, 1976, 1977 and 1979 and won another 15 East German champion titles in clean and press (until 1972), snatch and clean and jerk.
