= Trendafil Stoychev =

Bulgarian weightlifter (born 1953)

Olympic medal record

Men's weightlifting

Representing Bulgaria
Silver medal – second place	1976 Montreal	light-heavyweight

Trendafil Stoychev (Bulgarian: Трендафил Стойчев (born 18 July 1953) is a Bulgarian former weightlifter who competed in the 1976 Summer Olympics.
