= Valery Shary =

Soviet weightlifter

Medal record

Representing the Soviet Union

Men's weightlifting

Olympic Games
Gold medal – first place	1976 Montreal	75-82.5 kg

Valery Shary (Belarusian: Валерый Пятровіч Шарый, born 2 January 1947) is a former Belarusian weightlifter and Olympic champion who competed for the Soviet Union.

His 3 lift total of 527.5 kg (1,163 lb) in the 82.5k weight class was never surpassed.

== Biography ==
Shary was born in Chervyen.

Shary won a gold medal at the 1976 Summer Olympics in Montreal in light-heavyweight weightlifting, setting an Olympic record in the process. He also won the 1975 and 1976 World Championships in the same weight class.

George Eisen of Nazareth University included Shary on his list of Jewish Olympic Medalists (though he acknowledges that he may have included non-Jews). Eisen's list has been published and used in numerous other academia on Jews and Sports.

== See also ==
- List of select Jewish weightlifters
