= Aleksandr Voronin =

Russian weightlifter

Medal record

Men's weightlifting

Representing the Soviet Union

Olympic Games
Gold medal – first place	1976 Montreal	-52 kg

External image
- photo

Aleksandr Nikiforovich Voronin (Russian: Александр Никифорович Воронин, May 23, 1951 – September 26, 1992) was a Russian weightlifter and Olympic champion who competed for the Soviet Union.

He was born in Chelyabinsk.

Voronin won a gold medal at the 1976 Summer Olympics in Montreal.
