= Georgi Todorov (weightlifter) =

Bulgarian weightlifter (born 1952)

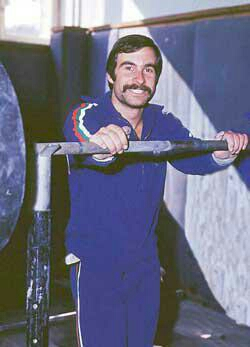
- Georgi Todorov, 1973

Personal information
- Born: 4 December 1952 (age 73)

Sport
- Sport: Weightlifting
Medal record
Representing Bulgaria
Olympic Games
Silver medal – second place	1976 Montreal	-60 kg
World Championships
Silver medal – second place	1973 Havana	-56 kg
Gold medal – first place	1974 Manila	-60 kg
Gold medal – first place	1975 Moscow	-60 kg
Silver medal – second place	1976 Montreal	-60 kg
Silver medal – second place	1977 Stuttgart	-56 kg
Silver medal – second place	1979 Thessaloniki	-60 kg
European Championships
Silver medal – second place	1972 Constanta	-56 kg
Silver medal – second place	1973 Madrid	-56 kg
Gold medal – first place	1974 Verona	-60 kg
Gold medal – first place	1975 Moscow	-60 kg
Bronze medal – third place	1976 East Berlin	-60 kg
Gold medal – first place	1977 Stuttgart	-56 kg
Silver medal – second place	1979 Varna	-60 kg

Georgi Todorov (Bulgarian: Георги Тодоров; born 4 December 1952) is a retired Bulgarian weightlifter who won the silver medal in the featherweight class at the 1976 Summer Olympics, as well as two world weightlifting championships and three European weightlifting championships. Todorov is an honorary citizen of the city of Varna.

== Weightlifting achievements ==
Todorov had the following podium finishes at major championships:

- 2nd in the 1976 Olympics featherweight class (280.0 kg);
- 2nd in the 1973 World Championships bantamweight class (255.0 kg);
- 1st in the 1974 World Championships featherweight class (280.0 kg);
- 1st in the 1975 World Championships featherweight class (285.0 kg);
- 2nd in the 1976 World Championships featherweight class (280.0 kg);
- 2nd in the 1977 World Championships bantamweight class (247.5 kg);
- 2nd in the 1979 World Championships featherweight class (275.0 kg);
- 2nd in the 1972 European Championships bantamweight class (355.0 kg);
- 2nd in the 1973 European Championships bantamweight class (252.5 kg);
- 1st in the 1974 European Championships featherweight class (272.5 kg);
- 1st in the 1975 European Championships featherweight class (285.0 kg);
- 3rd in the 1976 European Championships featherweight class (277.5 kg);
- 1st in the 1977 European Championships bantamweight class (247.5 kg);
- 2nd in the 1979 European Championships featherweight class (272.5 kg).

== World records ==
He set six featherweight world records from 1974 to 1976 – two in the snatch, one in the clean & jerk, and three in the total.
