= Nikolay Kolesnikov (weightlifter) =

Soviet weightlifter

Nikolay Kolesnikov (born 1952) is a former Soviet weightlifter, Olympic champion and world champion. He won the gold medal in the featherweight class at the 1976 Summer Olympics in Montreal.
