= 1977 European Weightlifting Championships =

International weightlifting competition

1977 European Championships

The 1977 European Weightlifting Championships were held in Stuttgart, West Germany from September 17 to September 25, 1977. This was the 56th edition of the event. There were 128 men in action from 24 nations. This tournament was a part of 1977 World Weightlifting Championships.

== Medal summary ==
Event	Gold		Silver		Bronze	
52 kg
Snatch	Aleksandr Voronin; Soviet Union	107.5 kg	György Kőszegi; Hungary	102.5 kg	Zygmunt Smalcerz; Poland	102.5 kg
Clean & Jerk	Aleksandr Voronin; Soviet Union	140.0 kg	György Kőszegi; Hungary	132.5 kg	Bela Olah; Hungary	127.5 kg
Total	Aleksandr Voronin; Soviet Union	247.5 kg WR	György Kőszegi; Hungary	235.0 kg	Bela Olah; Hungary	230.0 kg
56 kg
Snatch	Georgi Todorov; Bulgaria	110.0 kg	Tadeusz Dembończyk; Poland	110.0 kg	Leszek Skorupa; Poland	105.0 kg
Clean & Jerk	Frank Mavius; East Germany	140.0 kg	Georgi Todorov; Bulgaria	137.5 kg	Tadeusz Dembończyk; Poland	135.0 kg
Total	Georgi Todorov; Bulgaria	247.5 kg	Tadeusz Dembończyk; Poland	245.0 kg	Frank Mavius; East Germany	240.0 kg
60 kg
Snatch	Nikolay Kolesnikov; Soviet Union	122.5 kg	Grzegorz Cziura; Poland	122.5 kg	Yanko Rusev; Bulgaria	122.5 kg
Clean & Jerk	Nikolay Kolesnikov; Soviet Union	157.5 kg	Yanko Rusev; Bulgaria	155.0 kg	Ioan Buta; Romania	150.0 kg
Total	Nikolay Kolesnikov; Soviet Union	280.0 kg	Yanko Rusev; Bulgaria	277.5 kg	Grzegorz Cziura; Poland	270.0 kg
67.5 kg
Snatch	Daniel Senet; France	135.0 kg	Werner Schraut; West Germany	132.5 kg	Kazimierz Czarnecki; Poland	130.0 kg
Clean & Jerk	Sergey Pevsner; Soviet Union	172.5 kg	Zbigniew Kaczmarek; Poland	170.0 kg	Günter Ambraß; East Germany	165.0 kg
Total	Sergey Pevsner; Soviet Union	302.5 kg	Zbigniew Kaczmarek; Poland	297.5 kg	Werner Schraut; West Germany	292.5 kg
75 kg
Snatch	Yurik Vardanyan; Soviet Union	152.5 kg	Peter Wenzel; East Germany	150.0 kg	András Stark; Hungary	150.0 kg
Clean & Jerk	Yurik Vardanyan; Soviet Union	192.5 kg	Günter Schliwka; East Germany	190.0 kg	Peter Wenzel; East Germany	187.5 kg
Total	Yurik Vardanyan; Soviet Union	345.0 kg	Peter Wenzel; East Germany	337.5 kg	Günter Schliwka; East Germany	330.0 kg
82.5 kg
Snatch	Gennady Bessonov; Soviet Union	157.5 kg	Blagoy Blagoev; Bulgaria	155.0 kg	Péter Baczakó; Hungary	152.5 kg
Clean & Jerk	Gennady Bessonov; Soviet Union	195.0 kg	Paweł Rabczewski; Poland	192.5 kg	Péter Baczakó; Hungary	192.5 kg
Total	Gennady Bessonov; Soviet Union	352.5 kg	Péter Baczakó; Hungary	345.0 kg	Paweł Rabczewski; Poland	337.5 kg
90 kg
Snatch	Sergey Poltoratsky; Soviet Union	167.5 kg	Rolf Milser; West Germany	162.5 kg	Ferenc Antalovics; Hungary	157.5 kg
Clean & Jerk	Rolf Milser; West Germany	207.5 kg	Sergey Poltoratsky; Soviet Union	207.5 kg	György Rehus-Uzor; Hungary	190.0 kg
Total	Sergey Poltoratsky; Soviet Union	375.0 kg	Rolf Milser; West Germany	370.0 kg	György Rehus-Uzor; Hungary	347.5 kg
100 kg
Snatch	Michel Broillet; Switzerland	170.0 kg	Anatoly Kozlov; Soviet Union	162.5 kg	Helmut Losch; East Germany	162.5 kg
Clean & Jerk	Anatoly Kozlov; Soviet Union	205.0 kg	Helmut Losch; East Germany	205.0 kg	Lennart Dahlgren; Sweden	202.5 kg
Total	Anatoly Kozlov; Soviet Union	367.5 kg	Helmut Losch; East Germany	367.5 kg	Michel Broillet; Switzerland	365.0 kg
110 kg
Snatch	Valentin Hristov; Bulgaria	180.0 kg	Jürgen Ciezki; East Germany	172.5 kg	Yury Zaitsev; Soviet Union	170.0 kg
Clean & Jerk	Yury Zaitsev; Soviet Union	225.0 kg	Valentin Hristov; Bulgaria	225.0 kg	Leif Nilsson; Sweden	220.0 kg
Total	Valentin Hristov; Bulgaria	405.0 kg	Yury Zaitsev; Soviet Union	395.0 kg	Jürgen Ciezki; East Germany	390.0 kg
+110 kg
Snatch	Vasily Alekseyev; Soviet Union	185.0 kg	Jürgen Heuser; East Germany	182.5 kg	Aslanbek Yenaldiev; Soviet Union	182.5 kg
Clean & Jerk	Vasily Alekseyev; Soviet Union	245.0 kg	Aslanbek Yenaldiev; Soviet Union	240.0 kg	Jürgen Heuser; East Germany	237.5 kg
Total	Vasily Alekseyev; Soviet Union	430.0 kg	Aslanbek Yenaldiev; Soviet Union	422.5 kg	Jürgen Heuser; East Germany	420.0 kg

== Medal table ==
Ranking by Big (Total result) medals

Rank	Nation	Gold	Silver	Bronze	Total
1	Soviet Union (URS)	8	2	0	10
2	Bulgaria (BUL)	2	1	0	3
3	East Germany (GDR)	0	2	4	6
4	Hungary (HUN)	0	2	2	4
4	Poland (POL)	0	2	2	4
6	West Germany (FRG)	0	1	1	2
7	Switzerland (SUI)	0	0	1	1
Totals (7 entries)		10	10	10	30
