= 1978 European Weightlifting Championships =

International weightlifting competition

1978 European Championships

The 1978 European Weightlifting Championships were held in Havířov, Czechoslovakia from June 10 to June 18, 1978. This was the 57th edition of the event. There were 128 men in action from 25 nations.

== Medal summary ==
Event	Gold		Silver		Bronze	
52 kg
Snatch	Kanybek Osmonaliyev; Soviet Union	105.0 kg	Béla Oláh; Hungary	105.0 kg	György Kőszegi; Hungary	105.0 kg
Clean & Jerk	Kanybek Osmonaliyev; Soviet Union	132.5 kg	György Kőszegi; Hungary	132.5 kg	Béla Oláh; Hungary	130.0 kg
Total	Kanybek Osmonaliyev; Soviet Union	237.5 kg	György Kőszegi; Hungary	237.5 kg	Béla Oláh; Hungary	235.0 kg
56 kg
Snatch	Marek Seweryn; Poland	117.5 kg	Karel Prohl; Czechoslovakia	115.0 kg	Stefan Dimitrov; Bulgaria	115.0 kg
Clean & Jerk	Karel Prohl; Czechoslovakia	142.5 kg	Marek Seweryn; Poland	142.5 kg	Stefan Dimitrov; Bulgaria	140.0 kg
Total	Marek Seweryn; Poland	260.0 kg	Karel Prohl; Czechoslovakia	257.5 kg	Stefan Dimitrov; Bulgaria	255.0 kg
60 kg
Snatch	Nikolay Kolesnikov; Soviet Union	125.0 kg	László Száraz; Hungary	125.0 kg	Grzegorz Cziura; Poland	120.0 kg
Clean & Jerk	Nikolay Kolesnikov; Soviet Union	165.0 kg	Valentin Todorov; Bulgaria	155.0 kg	Marek Sachmaciński; Poland	152.5 kg
Total	Nikolay Kolesnikov; Soviet Union	290.0 kg	László Száraz; Hungary	275.0 kg	Valentin Todorov; Bulgaria	270.0 kg
67.5 kg
Snatch	Yanko Rusev; Bulgaria	137.5 kg	Ioan Buta; Romania	135.0 kg	Jaroslav Rutter; Czechoslovakia	132.5 kg
Clean & Jerk	Yanko Rusev; Bulgaria	175.0 kg	Zbigniew Kaczmarek; Poland	172.5 kg	Ioan Buta; Romania	170.0 kg
Total	Yanko Rusev; Bulgaria	312.5 kg	Ioan Buta; Romania	305.0 kg	Zbigniew Kaczmarek; Poland	302.5 kg
75 kg
Snatch	András Stark; Hungary	150.0 kg	Vardan Militosyan; Soviet Union	147.5 kg	Zahari Todorov; Bulgaria	145.0 kg
Clean & Jerk	Vardan Militosyan; Soviet Union	195.0 kg	Zahari Todorov; Bulgaria	185.0 kg	Peter Wenzel; East Germany	182.5 kg
Total	Vardan Militosyan; Soviet Union	342.5 kg	Zahari Todorov; Bulgaria	330.0 kg	András Stark; Hungary	330.0 kg
82.5 kg
Snatch	Yurik Vardanyan; Soviet Union	170.0 kg	Péter Baczakó; Hungary	157.5 kg	Krasimir Drandarov; Bulgaria	150.0 kg
Clean & Jerk	Yurik Vardanyan; Soviet Union	202.5 kg	Péter Baczakó; Hungary	200.0 kg	Krasimir Drandarov; Bulgaria	190.0 kg
Total	Yurik Vardanyan; Soviet Union	372.5 kg	Péter Baczakó; Hungary	357.5 kg	Krasimir Drandarov; Bulgaria	340.0 kg
90 kg
Snatch	David Rigert; Soviet Union	180.0 kg	Andon Nikolov; Bulgaria	167.5 kg	György Rehus-Uzor; Hungary	160.0 kg
Clean & Jerk	David Rigert; Soviet Union	217.5 kg	Rolf Milser; West Germany	215.0 kg	Nikolaos Iliadis; Greece	192.5 kg
Total	David Rigert; Soviet Union	397.5 kg	Rolf Milser; West Germany	375.0 kg	Andon Nikolov; Bulgaria	352.5 kg
100 kg
Snatch	Sergey Arakelov; Soviet Union	177.5 kg	Michel Broillet; Switzerland	165.0 kg	Igor Nikitin; Soviet Union	162.5 kg
Clean & Jerk	Sergey Arakelov; Soviet Union	210.0 kg	Igor Nikitin; Soviet Union	200.0 kg	Pierre Gourrier; France	197.5 kg
Total	Sergey Arakelov; Soviet Union	387.5 kg	Igor Nikitin; Soviet Union	362.5 kg	Michel Broillet; Switzerland	355.0 kg
110 kg
Snatch	Yury Zaitsev; Soviet Union	177.5 kg	Jürgen Ciezki; East Germany	170.0 kg	Leif Nilsson; Sweden	165.0 kg
Clean & Jerk	Yury Zaitsev; Soviet Union	225.0 kg	György Szalai; Hungary	215.0 kg	Jürgen Ciezki; East Germany	210.0 kg
Total	Yury Zaitsev; Soviet Union	402.5 kg	Jürgen Ciezki; East Germany	380.0 kg	Leif Nilsson; Sweden	375.0 kg
+110 kg
Snatch	Vasily Alekseyev; Soviet Union	180.0 kg	Rudolf Strejček; Czechoslovakia	177.5 kg	Jürgen Heuser; East Germany	175.0 kg
Clean & Jerk	Vasily Alekseyev; Soviet Union	235.0 kg	Jürgen Heuser; East Germany	232.5 kg	Gerd Bonk; East Germany	230.0 kg
Total	Vasily Alekseyev; Soviet Union	415.0 kg	Jürgen Heuser; East Germany	407.5 kg	Gerd Bonk; East Germany	402.5 kg

== Medal table ==
Ranking by Big (Total result) medals

Rank	Nation	Gold	Silver	Bronze	Total
1	Soviet Union (URS)	8	1	0	9
2	Bulgaria (BUL)	1	1	4	6
3	Poland (POL)	1	0	1	2
4	Hungary (HUN)	0	3	2	5
5	East Germany (GDR)	0	2	1	3
6	Czechoslovakia (TCH)	0	1	0	1
6	Romania (ROU)	0	1	0	1
6	West Germany (FRG)	0	1	0	1
9	Sweden (SWE)	0	0	1	1
9	Switzerland (SUI)	0	0	1	1
Totals (10 entries)		10	10	10	30
