= 1977 World Weightlifting Championships =

Men's world weightlifting event in Germany

1977 Men's World Championships
- Host city: Stuttgart, West Germany
- Dates: 17–25 September 1977

The 1977 Men's World Weightlifting Championships were held in Stuttgart, West Germany from September 17 to September 25, 1977. There were 186 men in action from 44 nations.

== Medal summary ==
Event	Gold		Silver		Bronze	
52 kg
Snatch	Aleksandr Voronin; Soviet Union	107.5 kg	Masatomo Takeuchi; Japan	105.0 kg	György Kőszegi; Hungary	102.5 kg
Clean & Jerk	Aleksandr Voronin; Soviet Union	140.0 kg	Mohammad Nassiri; Iran	135.0 kg	Francisco Casamayor; Cuba	132.5 kg
Total	Aleksandr Voronin; Soviet Union	247.5 kg WR	György Kőszegi; Hungary	235.0 kg	Francisco Casamayor; Cuba	230.0 kg
56 kg
Snatch	Daniel Núñez; Cuba	112.5 kg	Georgi Todorov; Bulgaria	110.0 kg	Tadeusz Dembończyk; Poland	110.0 kg
Clean & Jerk	Jiro Hosotani; Japan	145.0 kg	Chen Manlin; China	140.0 kg	Frank Mavius; East Germany	140.0 kg
Total	Jiro Hosotani; Japan	252.5 kg	Georgi Todorov; Bulgaria	247.5 kg	Chen Manlin; China	245.0 kg
60 kg
Snatch	Nikolay Kolesnikov; Soviet Union	122.5 kg	Grzegorz Cziura; Poland	122.5 kg	Yanko Rusev; Bulgaria	122.5 kg
Clean & Jerk	Nikolay Kolesnikov; Soviet Union	157.5 kg	Yanko Rusev; Bulgaria	155.0 kg	Ioan Buta; Romania	150.0 kg
Total	Nikolay Kolesnikov; Soviet Union	280.0 kg	Yanko Rusev; Bulgaria	277.5 kg	Grzegorz Cziura; Poland	270.0 kg
67.5 kg
Snatch	Roberto Urrutia; Cuba	142.5 kg WR	Daniel Senet; France	135.0 kg	Werner Schraut; West Germany	132.5 kg
Clean & Jerk	Sergey Pevsner; Soviet Union	172.5 kg	Roberto Urrutia; Cuba	172.5 kg	Zbigniew Kaczmarek; Poland	170.0 kg
Total	Roberto Urrutia; Cuba	315.0 kg	Sergey Pevsner; Soviet Union	302.5 kg	Zbigniew Kaczmarek; Poland	297.5 kg
75 kg
Snatch	Yurik Vardanyan; Soviet Union	152.5 kg	Peter Wenzel; East Germany	150.0 kg	András Stark; Hungary	150.0 kg
Clean & Jerk	Yurik Vardanyan; Soviet Union	192.5 kg	Günter Schliwka; East Germany	190.0 kg	Peter Wenzel; East Germany	187.5 kg
Total	Yurik Vardanyan; Soviet Union	345.0 kg	Peter Wenzel; East Germany	337.5 kg	Günter Schliwka; East Germany	330.0 kg
82.5 kg
Snatch	Gennady Bessonov; Soviet Union	157.5 kg	Blagoy Blagoev; Bulgaria	155.0 kg	Péter Baczakó; Hungary	152.5 kg
Clean & Jerk	Gennady Bessonov; Soviet Union	195.0 kg	Paweł Rabczewski; Poland	192.5 kg	Péter Baczakó; Hungary	192.5 kg
Total	Gennady Bessonov; Soviet Union	352.5 kg	Péter Baczakó; Hungary	345.0 kg	Paweł Rabczewski; Poland	337.5 kg
90 kg
Snatch	Sergey Poltoratsky; Soviet Union	167.5 kg	Rolf Milser; West Germany	162.5 kg	Ferenc Antalovics; Hungary	157.5 kg
Clean & Jerk	Rolf Milser; West Germany	207.5 kg	Sergey Poltoratsky; Soviet Union	207.5 kg	Alberto Blanco; Cuba	197.5 kg
Total	Sergey Poltoratsky; Soviet Union	375.0 kg	Rolf Milser; West Germany	370.0 kg	Alberto Blanco; Cuba	355.0 kg
100 kg
Snatch	Michel Broillet; Switzerland	170.0 kg	Anatoly Kozlov; Soviet Union	162.5 kg	Helmut Losch; East Germany	162.5 kg
Clean & Jerk	Anatoly Kozlov; Soviet Union	205.0 kg	Helmut Losch; East Germany	205.0 kg	Mark Cameron; United States	202.5 kg
Total	Anatoly Kozlov; Soviet Union	367.5 kg	Helmut Losch; East Germany	367.5 kg	Michel Broillet; Switzerland	365.0 kg
110 kg
Snatch	Valentin Hristov; Bulgaria	180.0 kg	Jürgen Ciezki; East Germany	172.5 kg	Yury Zaitsev; Soviet Union	170.0 kg
Clean & Jerk	Yury Zaitsev; Soviet Union	225.0 kg	Valentin Hristov; Bulgaria	225.0 kg	Leif Nilsson; Sweden	220.0 kg
Total	Valentin Hristov; Bulgaria	405.0 kg	Yury Zaitsev; Soviet Union	395.0 kg	Jürgen Ciezki; East Germany	390.0 kg
+110 kg
Snatch	Vasily Alekseyev; Soviet Union	185.0 kg	Jürgen Heuser; East Germany	182.5 kg	Aslanbek Yenaldiev; Soviet Union	182.5 kg
Clean & Jerk	Vasily Alekseyev; Soviet Union	245.0 kg	Aslanbek Yenaldiev; Soviet Union	240.0 kg	Jürgen Heuser; East Germany	237.5 kg
Total	Vasily Alekseyev; Soviet Union	430.0 kg	Aslanbek Yenaldiev; Soviet Union	422.5 kg	Jürgen Heuser; East Germany	420.0 kg

== Medal table ==
Ranking by Big (Total result) medals

Rank	Nation	Gold	Silver	Bronze	Total
1	Soviet Union	7	3	0	10
2	Bulgaria	1	2	0	3
3	Cuba	1	0	2	3
4	Japan	1	0	0	1
5	East Germany	0	2	3	5
6	Hungary	0	2	0	2
7	West Germany	0	1	0	1
8	Poland	0	0	3	3
9	China	0	0	1	1
9	Switzerland	0	0	1	1
Totals (10 entries)		10	10	10	30

Ranking by all medals: Big (Total result) and Small (Snatch and Clean & Jerk)

Rank	Nation	Gold	Silver	Bronze	Total
1	Soviet Union	21	6	2	29
2	Cuba	3	1	4	8
3	Bulgaria	2	6	1	9
4	Japan	2	1	0	3
5	West Germany	1	2	1	4
6	Switzerland	1	0	1	2
7	East Germany	0	7	7	14
8	Hungary	0	2	5	7
8	Poland	0	2	5	7
10	China	0	1	1	2
11	France	0	1	0	1
11	Iran	0	1	0	1
13	Romania	0	0	1	1
13	Sweden	0	0	1	1
13	United States	0	0	1	1
Totals (15 entries)		30	30	30	90
