= 1978 World Weightlifting Championships =

International weightlifting competition

1978 Men's World Championships
- Host city: Gettysburg, Pennsylvania, United States
- Dates: 4–8 October 1978

The 1978 Men's World Weightlifting Championships were held in Gettysburg, Pennsylvania, United States from October 4 to October 8, 1978. There were 185 men in action from 35 nations.

== Medal summary ==
Event	Gold		Silver		Bronze	
52 kg
Snatch	Kanybek Osmonaliyev; Soviet Union	105.0 kg	Tadeusz Golik; Poland	105.0 kg	Francisco Casamayor; Cuba	102.5 kg
Clean & Jerk	Kanybek Osmonaliyev; Soviet Union	135.0 kg	Tadeusz Golik; Poland	132.5 kg	Masatomo Takeuchi; Japan	130.0 kg
Total	Kanybek Osmonaliyev; Soviet Union	240.0 kg	Tadeusz Golik; Poland	237.5 kg	Francisco Casamayor; Cuba	230.0 kg
56 kg
Snatch	Daniel Núñez; Cuba	117.5 kg	Marek Seweryn; Poland	115.0 kg	Stefan Dimitrov; Bulgaria	110.0 kg
Clean & Jerk	Kenkichi Ando; Japan	145.0 kg	Tadeusz Dembończyk; Poland	142.5 kg	Daniel Núñez; Cuba	142.5 kg
Total	Daniel Núñez; Cuba	260.0 kg	Marek Seweryn; Poland	252.5 kg	Kenkichi Ando; Japan	252.5 kg
60 kg
Snatch	István Lénárt; Hungary	122.5 kg	László Száraz; Hungary	122.5 kg	Tan Hanyong; China	120.0 kg
Clean & Jerk	Takashi Saito; Japan	157.5 kg	Marek Sachmaciński; Poland	155.0 kg	Nikolay Kolesnikov; Soviet Union	152.5 kg
Total	Nikolay Kolesnikov; Soviet Union	270.0 kg	Takashi Saito; Japan	267.5 kg	Valentin Todorov; Bulgaria	267.5 kg
67.5 kg
Snatch	Mario Villalobo; Cuba	135.0 kg	Yanko Rusev; Bulgaria	135.0 kg	Virgil Dociu; Romania	132.5 kg
Clean & Jerk	Yanko Rusev; Bulgaria	175.0 kg	Zbigniew Kaczmarek; Poland	172.5 kg	Günter Ambraß; East Germany	170.0 kg
Total	Yanko Rusev; Bulgaria	310.0 kg	Zbigniew Kaczmarek; Poland	302.5 kg	Günter Ambraß; East Germany	300.0 kg
75 kg
Snatch	Roberto Urrutia; Cuba	155.0 kg	Julio Echenique; Cuba	147.5 kg	Vardan Militosyan; Soviet Union	147.5 kg
Clean & Jerk	Roberto Urrutia; Cuba	192.5 kg	Peter Wenzel; East Germany	190.0 kg	Vardan Militosyan; Soviet Union	190.0 kg
Total	Roberto Urrutia; Cuba	347.5 kg	Vardan Militosyan; Soviet Union	337.5 kg	Peter Wenzel; East Germany	335.0 kg
82.5 kg
Snatch	Yurik Vardanyan; Soviet Union	170.0 kg	Péter Baczakó; Hungary	157.5 kg	Paweł Rabczewski; Poland	150.0 kg
Clean & Jerk	Yurik Vardanyan; Soviet Union	207.5 kg	Daniel Zayas; Cuba	195.0 kg	Péter Baczakó; Hungary	195.0 kg
Total	Yurik Vardanyan; Soviet Union	377.5 kg WR	Péter Baczakó; Hungary	352.5 kg	Paweł Rabczewski; Poland	345.0 kg
90 kg
Snatch	Andon Nikolov; Bulgaria	170.0 kg	György Rehus-Uzor; Hungary	165.0 kg	Ferenc Antalovics; Hungary	165.0 kg
Clean & Jerk	Rolf Milser; West Germany	215.0 kg	Gennady Bessonov; Soviet Union	210.0 kg	Ferenc Antalovics; Hungary	202.5 kg
Total	Rolf Milser; West Germany	377.5 kg	Gennady Bessonov; Soviet Union	375.0 kg	Ferenc Antalovics; Hungary	367.5 kg
100 kg
Snatch	Sergey Arakelov; Soviet Union	172.5 kg	David Rigert; Soviet Union	170.0 kg	Manfred Funke; East Germany	167.5 kg
Clean & Jerk	David Rigert; Soviet Union	220.0 kg	Sergey Arakelov; Soviet Union	217.5 kg	Anton Baraniak; Czechoslovakia	205.0 kg
Total	David Rigert; Soviet Union	390.0 kg	Sergey Arakelov; Soviet Union	390.0 kg	Manfred Funke; East Germany	367.5 kg
110 kg
Snatch	Leif Nilsson; Sweden	175.0 kg	Yury Zaitsev; Soviet Union	172.5 kg	Jürgen Ciezki; East Germany	170.0 kg
Clean & Jerk	Yury Zaitsev; Soviet Union	230.0 kg	Jürgen Ciezki; East Germany	215.0 kg	György Szalai; Hungary	210.0 kg
Total	Yury Zaitsev; Soviet Union	402.5 kg	Jürgen Ciezki; East Germany	385.0 kg	Leif Nilsson; Sweden	385.0 kg
+110 kg
Snatch	Sultan Rakhmanov; Soviet Union	187.5 kg	Hristo Plachkov; Bulgaria	187.5 kg	Jürgen Heuser; East Germany	185.0 kg
Clean & Jerk	Gerd Bonk; East Germany	235.0 kg	Jürgen Heuser; East Germany	232.5 kg	Sultan Rakhmanov; Soviet Union	230.0 kg
Total	Jürgen Heuser; East Germany	417.5 kg	Sultan Rakhmanov; Soviet Union	417.5 kg	Gerd Bonk; East Germany	410.0 kg

== Medal table ==
Ranking by Big (Total result) medals

Rank	Nation	Gold	Silver	Bronze	Total
1	Soviet Union	5	4	0	9
2	Cuba	2	0	1	3
3	East Germany	1	1	4	6
4	Bulgaria	1	0	1	2
5	West Germany	1	0	0	1
6	Poland	0	3	1	4
7	Hungary	0	1	1	2
7	Japan	0	1	1	2
9	Sweden	0	0	1	1
Totals (9 entries)		10	10	10	30

Ranking by all medals: Big (Total result) and Small (Snatch and Clean & Jerk)

Rank	Nation	Gold	Silver	Bronze	Total
1	Soviet Union	13	8	4	25
2	Cuba	6	2	3	11
3	Bulgaria	3	2	2	7
4	East Germany	2	4	8	14
5	Japan	2	1	2	5
6	West Germany	2	0	0	2
7	Hungary	1	4	5	10
8	Sweden	1	0	1	2
9	Poland	0	9	2	11
10	China	0	0	1	1
10	Czechoslovakia	0	0	1	1
10	Romania	0	0	1	1
Totals (12 entries)		30	30	30	90
