= Ján Nagy =

Slovak weightlifter (1945–2025)

Personal information
- Born: 12 April 1945 Sereď, Czechoslovakia
- Died: 24 October 2025 (aged 80)

Sport
- Sport: Weightlifting

Ján Nagy (12 April 1945 – 24 October 2025) was a Slovak weightlifter. He competed in the men's super heavyweight event at the 1976 Summer Olympics. He held a long-standing national record in the clean and jerk and won the bronze medal in that event at the 1976 World Weightlifting Championships.

== Biography ==
Nagy was born in Sereď, Czechoslovakia, on 12 April 1945. He spent his first three years there before his family moved to Ostrov nad Ohří, Bohemia. He enjoyed sports, particularly running, from a young age. At age 11, he was hospitalized for a year with rheumatic fever. Nagy applied to become a pilot at a military academy after primary school, but was unable to pass his tests due to illness. Doctors forbade him from competing in sports, as the rheumatic fever had weakened his heart. Despite this, he began weightlifting with friends as a teenager. By 1964, he was able to clean and jerk lift 120 kilograms (260 lb). He served in the military at Týniště nad Orlicí beginning that year.

He was coached by František Škarda in weightlifting and was a member of the club Baník Sokolov. In 1972, Nagy became part of the Czechoslovak national weightlifting team, for whom he competed through 1979. Considered the "strongest man in Czechoslovakia", he set dozens of national records and won the national championship in his weight class in 1973, 1974, 1975, 1977, and 1978. His greatest sporting achievement came at the 1976 Summer Olympics in Montreal, Canada, where Nagy participated in the super heavyweight event. He finished with total lifts of 387.5 kilograms (854 lb) which was tied with Helmut Losch of Germany for third, although Losch received the bronze medal on a tiebreaker based on the weights of the competitors. The Olympics acted as the 1976 World Weightlifting Championships, and thus Nagy was awarded a bronze medal for his clean and jerk lift of 227.5 kilograms (502 lb), which had been third among Olympic competitors.

Nagy competed at the European Weightlifting Championships eight times, with a best finish of fifth place at the 1978 European Weightlifting Championships. He competed at the World Weightlifting Championships four times, finishing fourth at the 1975 edition. He was named the best weightlifter in the country by the Czechoslovak Weightlifting Association in 1976. In his career, he had a best lift of 242.5 kilograms (535 lb) in the clean and jerk, the Czechoslovak record. This mark remained the best in the Czech Republic until 2017, while it has not been surpassed in Slovakia as of 2025. For his achievements, he received the titles Master of Sports and Merited Master of Sports.

In 1979, Nagy's career ended due to a conflict with a leading weightlifting official, Josef Hajný. He later recalled that Hajný had demanded Nagy compete at the Czechoslovak–Soviet Friendship Cup, despite the latter having just recovered from illness and also training for the 1980 Summer Olympics in Moscow. Nagy said:

I explained to him in vain that I was preparing for the Olympics and that this start would not benefit me at all. It was not a revolt or a boycott on my part. However, Hajný categorically insisted on his position and declared that if I didn't go to Bohumín, I could say goodbye to the Olympics. I told him that he could postpone the Bohumín event. Everything was resolved in a second. I came home, wrote to the officials in our club and in Prague that for health reasons I'm quitting. And so my weightlifting career ended.

Nagy was inducted into the Hall of Fame of the Czech Weightlifting Association. After his weightlifting career, Nagy moved to Germany, where he had a family and lived in Seukendorf, working at the Kraftwerk Union company. He later moved back to the Czech Republic in 2000, living in Karlovy Vary. He died on 24 October 2025, at the age of 80.
