= Weightlifting at the 1976 Summer Olympics – Men's 82.5 kg =

Weightlifting at the Olympics

Men's 82.5 kg at the Games of the XXI Olympiad
- Venue: St. Michel Arena
- Date: 24 July 1976
- Competitors: 17 from 14 nations
- Winning total: 365.0 kg OR

Medalists
| 1st place, gold medalist(s) | | Valery Shary | Soviet Union |
| 2nd place, silver medalist(s) | | Trendafil Stoychev | Bulgaria |
| 3rd place, bronze medalist(s) | | Péter Baczakó | Hungary |

The men's 82.5 kg weightlifting competitions at the 1976 Summer Olympics in Montreal took place on 24 July at the St. Michel Arena. It was the thirteenth appearance of the light heavyweight class.

== Results ==
| Rank | Name | Country | kg |
|---|---|---|---|
| 1 | Valery Shary | Soviet Union | 365.0 |
| 2 | Trendafil Stoychev | Bulgaria | 360.0 |
| 3 | Péter Baczakó | Hungary | 345.0 |
| 4 | Nikos Iliadis | Greece | 340.0 |
| 5 | Juhani Avellan | Finland | 330.0 |
| 6 | Stefan Jacobsson | Sweden | 317.5 |
| 7 | Sueo Fujishiro | Japan | 315.0 |
| 8 | Gerd Kennel | West Germany | 312.5 |
| 9 | Erling Johansen | Denmark | 307.5 |
| 10 | Samuel Bigler | United States | 307.5 |
| 11 | Pablo Justiniani | Panama | 295.0 |
| 12 | Mehmet Suvar | Turkey | 292.5 |
| AC | Ferenc Antalovics | Hungary | 155.0 |
| AC | Rolf Milser | West Germany | 205.0 |
| AC | Blagoy Blagoev | Bulgaria | 362.5 (DQ) |
| AC | Pierre St.-Jean | Canada | DNF |
| AC | Leif Jensen | Norway | DNF |
