= Weightlifting at the 1976 Summer Olympics – Men's 67.5 kg =

Weightlifting at the Olympics

Men's 67.5 kg at the Games of the XXI Olympiad
- Venue: St. Michel Arena
- Date: 21 July 1976
- Competitors: 23 from 18 nations
- Winning total: 305.0 kg

Medalists
1st place, gold medalist(s)		Petro Korol	Soviet Union
2nd place, silver medalist(s)		Daniel Senet	France
3rd place, bronze medalist(s)		Kazimierz Czarnecki	Poland

The men's 67.5 kg weightlifting competitions at the 1976 Summer Olympics in Montreal took place on 21 July at the St. Michel Arena. It was the thirteenth appearance of the lightweight class.

== Results ==
Rank	Name	Country	kg
1	Petro Korol	Soviet Union	305.0
2	Daniel Senet	France	300.0
3	Kazimierz Czarnecki	Poland	295.0
4	Günter Ambraß	East Germany	295.0
5	Yatsuo Shimaya	Japan	292.5
6	Tony Urrutia	Cuba	292.5
7	Werner Schraut	West Germany	290.0
8	Roland Chavigny	France	285.0
9	Kevin Welch-Kennedy	Great Britain	282.5
10	Walter Legel	Austria	272.5
11	Dan Cantore	United States	272.5
12	Kemal Başkır	Turkey	270.0
13	Gottfried Langthaler	Austria	270.0
14	Francisco Mateos	Spain	270.0
15	Alan Winterbourne	Great Britain	267.5
16	Julio Martínez	Puerto Rico	260.0
17	Warino Lestanto	Indonesia	255.0
18	Sergio Moreno	Nicaragua	217.5
AC	Eleftherios Stefanoudakis	Greece	120.0
AC	Yusaku Ono	Japan	125.0
AC	Dušan Drška	Czechoslovakia	127.5
AC	Zbigniew Kaczmarek	Poland	307.5 (DQ)
AC	Phillip Sue	New Zealand	DNF
