= Weightlifting at the 1976 Summer Olympics – Men's 110 kg =

Weightlifting at the Olympics

Men's 110 kg at the Games of the XXI Olympiad
- Venue: St. Michel Arena
- Date: 26 July 1976
- Competitors: 22 from 16 nations
- Winning total: 385.0 kg OR

Medalists
1st place, gold medalist(s)		Yury Zaytsev	Soviet Union
2nd place, silver medalist(s)		Krastyu Semerdzhiev	Bulgaria
3rd place, bronze medalist(s)		Tadeusz Rutkowski	Poland

The men's 110 kg weightlifting competitions at the 1976 Summer Olympics in Montreal took place on 26 July at the St. Michel Arena. It was the thirteenth Olympic appearance of the heavyweight class.

== Results ==
Rank	Name	Country	kg
1	Yury Zaytsev	Soviet Union	385.0
2	Krastyu Semerdzhiev	Bulgaria	385.0
3	Tadeusz Rutkowski	Poland	377.5
4	Pierre Gourrier	France	372.5
5	Jürgen Ciezki	East Germany	372.5
6	Javier González	Cuba	365.0
7	Leif Nilsson	Sweden	365.0
8	Rudolf Strejček	Czechoslovakia	362.5
9	Russ Prior	Canada	362.5
10	Taito Haara	Finland	360.0
11	Lennart Dahlgren	Sweden	355.0
12	Gary Drinnon	United States	352.5
13	Vinzenz Hörtnagl	Austria	350.0
14	John Burns	Great Britain	347.5
15	Rory Barrett	New Zealand	342.5
16	Robert Santavy	Canada	337.5
17	Houshang Kargarnejad	Iran	322.5
AC	Ali Vali	Iran	140.0
AC	Stephen Wyatt	Australia	150.0
AC	Mark Cameron	United States	375.0 (DQ)
AC	Valentin Hristov	Bulgaria	400.0 (DQ)
AC	Brian Strange	Great Britain	DNF
