= Weightlifting at the 1976 Summer Olympics – Men's 56 kg =

Weightlifting at the Olympics

Men's 56 kg at the Games of the XXI Olympiad
- Venue: St. Michel Arena
- Date: 19 July 1976
- Competitors: 24 from 19 nations
- Winning total: 262.5 kg WR

Medalists
1st place, gold medalist(s)		Norair Nurikyan	Bulgaria
2nd place, silver medalist(s)		Grzegorz Cziura	Poland
3rd place, bronze medalist(s)		Kenkichi Ando	Japan

The men's 56 kg weightlifting competitions at the 1976 Summer Olympics in Montreal took place on 19 July at the St. Michel Arena. It was the eighth appearance of the bantamweight class.

== Results ==
Rank	Name	Country	kg
1	Norair Nurikyan	Bulgaria	262.5
2	Grzegorz Cziura	Poland	252.5
3	Kenkichi Ando	Japan	250.0
4	Leszek Skorupa	Poland	250.0
5	Imre Földi	Hungary	245.0
6	Bernhard Bachfisch	West Germany	242.5
7	Carlos Lastre	Cuba	240.0
8	Fazlollah Dehkhoda	Iran	240.0
9	Jean-Claude Chavigny	France	235.0
10	Feyzollah Nasseri	Iran	232.5
11	Muhammad Manzoor	Pakistan	225.0
12	Serge Stresser	France	225.0
13	Arturo del Rosario	Philippines	222.5
14	Ahmed Mahmoud Mashall	Egypt	217.5
15	Edgar Tornez	Guatemala	215.0
16	Paulo de Sene	Brazil	215.0
17	Ezequiel Sánchez	Colombia	210.0
AC	Jiro Hosotani	Japan	100.0
AC	Imre Stefanovics	Hungary	102.5
AC	Han Gyong-si	North Korea	110.0
AC	Naftaly Parrales	Nicaragua	DNF
AC	Yves Carignan	Canada	DNF
AC	Karel Prohl	Czechoslovakia	DNF
AC	Kurt Pittner	Austria	DNF
