= Weightlifting at the 1976 Summer Olympics – Men's +110 kg =

Weightlifting at the Olympics

Men's +110 kg at the Games of the XXI Olympiad
- Venue: St. Michel Arena
- Date: 27 July 1976
- Competitors: 11 from 8 nations
- Winning total: 440.0 kg OR

Medalists
1st place, gold medalist(s)		Vasily Alekseyev	Soviet Union
2nd place, silver medalist(s)		Gerd Bonk	East Germany
3rd place, bronze medalist(s)		Helmut Losch	East Germany

The men's +110 kg weightlifting competitions at the 1976 Summer Olympics in Montreal took place on 27 July at the St. Michel Arena. It was the second appearance of the super heavyweight class.

== Results ==
Rank	Name	Country	kg
1	Vasily Alekseyev	Soviet Union	440.0
2	Gerd Bonk	East Germany	405.0
3	Helmut Losch	East Germany	387.5
4	Ján Nagy	Czechoslovakia	387.5
5	Bruce Wilhelm	United States	387.5
6	Gerardo Fernández	Cuba	365.0
7	Bob Edmond	Australia	347.5
8	Jan-Olof Nolsjö	Sweden	337.5
9	Sam Walker	United States	325.0
AC	Petr Pavlásek	Czechoslovakia	387.5 (DQ)
AC	Jouko Leppä	Finland	DNF
