= Weightlifting at the 1980 Summer Olympics – Men's 56 kg =

Weightlifting at the Olympics

Men's 56 kg at the Games of the XXII Olympiad
- Venue: Izmailovo Sports Palace
- Date: 21 July 1980
- Competitors: 21 from 17 nations

Medalists
1st place, gold medalist(s)		Daniel Núñez	Cuba
2nd place, silver medalist(s)		Yurik Sarkisyan	Soviet Union
3rd place, bronze medalist(s)		Tadeusz Dembończyk	Poland

The Men's Bantamweight Weightlifting Event (– 56 kg) is the second lightest men's event at the weightlifting competition, limiting competitors to a maximum of 56 kilograms of body mass. Each weightlifter had three attempts for both the snatch and clean and jerk lifting methods. The total of the best successful lift of each method was used to determine the final rankings and medal winners. Competition took place on 21 July in the Izmailovo Sports Palace.

For third place there was a tie between Tadeusz Dembończyk and Andreas Letz as they both weighed 55.60 kg at the weigh-in and they both had a 265 kg total. They were re-weighed after the event, Dembończyk weighed 0.1 kg less than Letz and was awarded the bronze medal.

== Results ==
Rank	Name	Body weight	Snatch (kg)				Clean & Jerk (kg)				Total (kg)
Rank	Name	Body weight	1	2	3	Result	1	2	3	Result	Total (kg)
1st place, gold medalist(s)	Daniel Núñez (CUB)	55.60	117.5	122.5	125	125	145	150	~~152.5~~	150	275
2nd place, silver medalist(s)	Yurik Sarkisyan (URS)	55.80	~~112.5~~	112.5	~~117.5~~	112.5	150	155	157.5	157.5	270
3rd place, bronze medalist(s)	Tadeusz Dembończyk (POL)	55.60	115	120	~~122.5~~	120	140	~~145~~	145	145	265
4	Andreas Letz (GDR)	55.60	110	~~115~~	115	115	145	150	~~152.5~~	150	265
5	Yang Eui-yong (PRK)	55.75	107.5	112.5	~~115~~	112.5	145	~~150~~	150	150	262.5
6	Imre Stefanovics (HUN)	55.15	110	~~115~~	115	115	145	~~150~~	~~150~~	145	260
7	Gheorghe Maftei (ROU)	55.40	105	~~110~~	~~110~~	105	142.5	~~147.5~~	~~147.5~~	142.5	247.5
8	Petre Pavel (ROU)	55.40	~~105~~	~~105~~	105	105	140	~~145~~	~~145~~	140	245
9	Choe Jong-sop (PRK)	55.70	100	105	~~110~~	105	132.5	137.5	~~142.5~~	137.5	242.5
10	Ioannis Sidiropoulos (GRE)	55.95	~~102.5~~	102.5	~~107.5~~	102.5	132.5	137.5	140	140	242.5
11	Ahmed Tarbi (ALG)	55.55	100	105	~~107.5~~	105	127.5	132.5	135	135	240
12	Abdul Karim Gizar (IRQ)	55.85	100	105	~~107.5~~	105	127.5	132.5	135	135	240
13	Arvo Ojalehto (FIN)	55.95	~~105~~	~~105~~	105	105	132.5	~~137.5~~	~~137.5~~	132.5	237.5
14	Johnny Helsing (SWE)	55.85	~~95~~	95	100	100	132.5	~~137.5~~	~~137.5~~	132.5	232.5
15	Pertti Torikka (SWE)	55.70	100	~~105~~	~~105~~	100	130	~~135~~	~~135~~	130	230
16	Lorenzo Orsini (AUS)	55.15	90	~~95~~	95	95	120	~~125~~	125	125	220
17	Ali Shalabi (LBA)	55.95	85	90	95	95	115	120	~~125~~	120	215
18	Ashok Kumar Karki (NEP)	55.40	60	65	~~67.5~~	65	~~80~~	~~80~~	80	80	145
-	György Kőszegi (HUN)	55.55	110	~~115~~	~~115~~	110	~~142.5~~	~~142.5~~	~~142.5~~	-	DNF
-	Bruno Lebrun (FRA)	56.00	105	~~110~~	~~110~~	105	~~132.5~~	~~132.5~~	~~132.5~~	-	DNF
-	Tamil Selwan Muniswamy (IND)	56.00	~~100~~	~~100~~	100	100	~~115~~	~~115~~	~~115~~	-	DNF

== New records ==
Snatch	125.0 kg	Daniel Núñez (CUB)	WR
Clean & Jerk	157.5 kg	Yurik Sarkisyan (URS)	WR
Total	275.0 kg	Daniel Núñez (CUB)	WR
