= Helsing =

Helsing or Hellsing may refer to:

- Helsing (surname)
- Helsing (company), a German defence technology company
- Hellsing, a Japanese manga series

== See also ==
- Van Helsing (disambiguation)
- Helsingborg, a town and the seat of Helsingborg Municipality, Scania, Sweden
- Helsinge, the municipal seat of Gribskov Municipality in Region Hovedstaden on Zealand in Denmark
- Helsinge socken, one of the historic parishes that make up the modern city of Vantaa in Finland, and the origin of the name Helsingfors (Finnish: Helsinki)
- Helsinki, the capital of Finland
- Helsingør, a city in Denmark
