= Ota Zaremba =

Czech weightlifter (1957–2026)

Personal information
- Born: 22 April 1957 Havířov, Czechoslovakia
- Died: 23 January 2026 (aged 68)
Medal record
Men's Weightlifting
Representing Czechoslovakia
Olympic Games
Gold medal – first place	1980 Moscow	100 kg
World Weightlifting Championships
Gold medal – first place	1980 Moscow	100 kg

Ota Zaremba (22 April 1957 – 23 January 2026) was a Czech weightlifter. Representing Czechoslovakia, he won gold medal in the heavyweight I class at the 1980 Summer Olympics in Moscow. He was also a world champion.

After he ended his career, Zaremba admitted he used doping throughout his career with the acknowledgment of the sport officials and coaches.

In 2010 Zaremba entered the far-right Workers' Party of Social Justice (DSSS).

Zaremba died on 23 January 2026, at the age of 68.
