= Helsing (surname) =

Helsing or Hellsing is a Swedish surname referring to the Swedish province (landskap) Hälsingland. Someone from Hälsingland is called a "Hälsinge", with the old (from the 17th to the 18th century) spelling that is "Helsing" or "Hellsing" (from Helsingland/Helsingeland). Notable people with the surname include:

- Anna-Maria Helsing (born 1971), Finnish-Swedish conductor
- Elisabet Helsing (1940–2019), Norwegian nutritional physiologist
- Johnny Helsing (born 1955), Swedish weightlifter
- Lennart Hellsing (1919–2015), Swedish writer and translator
- Tullik Helsing (1918–1994), Norwegian sports diver

== Fictional characters ==
- Abraham Van Helsing, vampire hunter in Dracula-fiction
- Stan Helsing, Canadian-American horror comedy film and its protagonist

== See also ==
- Van Helsing (disambiguation)
