= Weightlifting at the 1976 Summer Olympics – Men's 90 kg =

Weightlifting at the Olympics

Men's 90 kg at the Games of the XXI Olympiad
- Venue: St. Michel Arena
- Date: 25 July 1976
- Competitors: 19 from 16 nations
- Winning total: 382.5 kg OR

Medalists
1st place, gold medalist(s)		David Rigert	Soviet Union
2nd place, silver medalist(s)		Lee James	United States
3rd place, bronze medalist(s)		Atanas Shopov	Bulgaria

The men's 90 kg weightlifting competitions at the 1976 Summer Olympics in Montreal took place on 25 July at the St. Michel Arena. It was the seventh appearance of the middle heavyweight class.

== Results ==
Rank	Name	Country	kg
1	David Rigert	Soviet Union	382.5
2	Lee James	United States	362.5
3	Atanas Shopov	Bulgaria	360.0
4	György Rehus-Uzor	Hungary	350.0
5	Peter Petzold	East Germany	345.0
6	Alberto Blanco	Cuba	345.0
7	Yvon Coussin	France	332.5
8	Guðmundur Sigurðsson	Iceland	332.5
9	Gary Langford	Great Britain	327.5
10	Jean-Pierre Van Lerberghe	Belgium	327.5
11	Brian Marsden	New Zealand	322.5
12	Rudolf Hill	Austria	320.0
13	Ken Price	Great Britain	307.5
AC	Rolf Larsen	Norway	140.0
AC	Jaakko Kailajärvi	Finland	145.0
AC	Khristos Iakovou	Greece	155.0
AC	Michel Broillet	Switzerland	165.0
AC	Phil Grippaldi	United States	355.0 (DQ)
AC	Sergey Poltoratsky	Soviet Union	DNF
