= Weightlifting at the 1980 Summer Olympics – Men's 60 kg =

Weightlifting at the Olympics

Men's 60 kg at the Games of the XXII Olympiad
- Venue: Izmailovo Sports Palace
- Date: 22 July 1980
- Competitors: 18 from 14 nations

Medalists
1st place, gold medalist(s)		Viktor Mazin	Soviet Union
2nd place, silver medalist(s)		Stefan Dimitrov	Bulgaria
3rd place, bronze medalist(s)		Marek Seweryn	Poland

These are the results of the Men's Featherweight Weightlifting Event (– 60 kg) at the 1980 Olympic Weightlifting competition in Moscow. A total of 18 men competed in this event, limited to competitors with a maximum body weight of 60 kilograms.

Each weightlifter had three attempts for both the snatch and clean and jerk lifting methods. The total of the best successful lift of each method was used to determine the final rankings and medal winners. Competition took place on 22 July in the Izmailovo Sports Palace.

== Results ==
Rank	Name	Body weight	Snatch (kg)				Clean & Jerk (kg)				Total (kg)
Rank	Name	Body weight	1	2	3	Result	1	2	3	Result	Total (kg)
1st place, gold medalist(s)	Viktor Mazin (URS)	59.65	122.5	127.5	130	130	155	160	~~162.5~~	160	290
2nd place, silver medalist(s)	Stefan Dimitrov (BUL)	59.40	122.5	127.5	~~130~~	127.5	~~152.5~~	152.5	160	160	287.5
3rd place, bronze medalist(s)	Marek Seweryn (POL)	59.55	122.5	127.5	~~130~~	127.5	155	~~162.5~~	~~162.5~~	155	282.5
4	Antoni Pawlak (POL)	59.65	~~120~~	120	~~125~~	120	150	155	~~162.5~~	155	275
5	Julio Loscos (CUB)	59.70	120	125	~~127.5~~	125	~~150~~	150	~~157.5~~	150	275
6	František Nedvěd (TCH)	59.70	117.5	~~122.5~~	122.5	122.5	~~147.5~~	147.5	150	150	272.5
7	Víctor Pérez (CUB)	59.40	117.5	~~122.5~~	~~122.5~~	117.5	147.5	152.5	~~157.5~~	152.5	270
8	Gelu Radu (ROU)	60.00	115	~~120~~	~~120~~	115	~~150~~	150	~~157.5~~	150	265
9	Jean-Claude Chavigny (FRA)	59.60	110	~~115~~	115	115	140	~~150~~	~~150~~	140	255
10	Fajsal Matloub Fathi (IRQ)	60.00	105	112.5	115	115	132.5	137.5	~~140~~	137.5	252.5
11	Mohamed Gouni (ALG)	59.65	107.5	~~112.5~~	~~112.5~~	107.5	132.5	137.5	140	140	247.5
12	Geoffrey Laws (GBR)	60.00	105	110	~~112.5~~	110	~~135~~	135	~~140~~	135	245
13	Faouaz Nadirin (SYR)	59.90	97.5	102.5	~~105~~	102.5	122.5	127.5	~~130~~	127.5	230
14	Sydney Ikebaku (NGR)	59.65	90	97.5	~~102.5~~	97.5	115	120	125	125	222.5
15	Rajendra Pradhan (NEP)	59.20	62.5	67.5	~~70~~	67.5	80	85	~~90~~	85	152.5
-	Paulo Batista de Sene (BRA)	59.65	100	~~105~~	~~105~~	100	~~135~~	~~135~~	~~135~~	-	DNF
-	Constantin Chiru (ROU)	59.60	~~120~~	~~120~~	~~120~~	-	-	-	-	-	DNF
-	Jeffrey Bryce (GBR)	56.00	~~105~~	~~105~~	~~105~~	-	-	-	-	-	DNF

== New records ==
Snatch	130.0 kg	Viktor Mazin (URS)	OR
Total	290.0 kg	Viktor Mazin (URS)	OR
