= Pavlásek =

Pavlásek (feminine: Pavlásková) is a Czech surname, a diminutive of the name Pavel. Notable people with the surname include:

- Adam Pavlásek (born 1994), Czech tennis player
- Petr Pavlásek (1947–2023), Czech weightlifter
