= Rafael Ortega =

Rafael Ortega may refer to:

- Rafael Ortega (boxer) (born 1950), Panamanian boxer
- Rafael Ortega (baseball) (born 1991), Venezuelan baseball outfielder
- Rafael Ortega (weightlifter) (born 1953), Dominican Republic weightlifter
- Rafael Ortega (tennis), Mexican tennis player
