= Weightlifting at the 1976 Summer Olympics – Men's 52 kg =

Weightlifting at the Olympics

Men's 52 kg at the Games of the XXI Olympiad
- Venue: St. Michel Arena
- Date: 18 July 1976
- Competitors: 23 from 18 nations
- Winning total: 242.5 kg WR

Medalists
1st place, gold medalist(s)		Aleksandr Voronin	Soviet Union
2nd place, silver medalist(s)		György Kőszegi	Hungary
3rd place, bronze medalist(s)		Mohammad Nassiri	Iran

The men's 52 kg weightlifting competitions at the 1976 Summer Olympics in Montreal took place on 18 July at the St. Michel Arena. It was the second appearance of the flyweight class.

== Results ==
Rank	Name	Country	kg
1	Aleksandr Voronin	Soviet Union	242.5
2	György Kőszegi	Hungary	237.5
3	Mohammad Nassiri	Iran	235.0
4	Masatomo Takeuchi	Japan	232.5
5	Francisco Casamayor	Cuba	227.5
6	Stefan Leletko	Poland	220.0
7	Boleslav Pachol	Czechoslovakia	217.5
8	Daniel Núñez	Cuba	215.0
9	Salvador del Rosario	Philippines	212.5
10	Im Jae-ho	North Korea	210.0
11	Preecha Chiocharn	Thailand	210.0
12	Narcisco Orán	Panama	202.5
13	Precious McKenzie	Great Britain	200.0
14	Ioannis Athanasiadis	Greece	197.5
15	Porfirio de León	Puerto Rico	190.0
16	Gustavo Quintana	Colombia	185.0
AC	Moustafa Ali Abdel Halim	Egypt	90.0
AC	Lajos Szűcs	Hungary	95.0
AC	Takeshi Horikoshi	Japan	100.0
AC	Zygmunt Smalcerz	Poland	DNF
AC	Rafael Ortega	Dominican Republic	DNF
AC	Anil Mondal	India	DNF
AC	San Lázaro de la Cruz	Dominican Republic	DNF
