= Weightlifting at the 1980 Summer Olympics – Men's 75 kg =

Weightlifting at the Olympics

Men's 75 kg at the Games of the XXII Olympiad
- Venue: Izmailovo Sports Palace
- Date: 24 July 1980
- Competitors: 16 from 14 nations

Medalists
1st place, gold medalist(s)		Asen Zlatev	Bulgaria
2nd place, silver medalist(s)		Aleksandr Pervi	Soviet Union
3rd place, bronze medalist(s)		Nedelcho Kolev	Bulgaria

These are the results of the Men's Middleweight Weightlifting Event (– 75 kg) at the 1980 Olympic Weightlifting competition in Moscow. A total of 16 men competed in this event, limited to competitors with a maximum body weight of 75 kilograms.

Each weightlifter had three attempts for both the snatch and clean and jerk lifting methods. The total of the best successful lift of each method was used to determine the final rankings and medal winners. Competition took place on 24 July in the Izmailovo Sports Palace.

== Results ==
Rank	Name	Body weight	Snatch (kg)				Clean & Jerk (kg)				Total (kg)
Rank	Name	Body weight	1	2	3	Result	1	2	3	Result	Total (kg)
1st place, gold medalist(s)	Asen Zlatev (BUL)	74.65	155	160	~~162.5~~	160	190	200	~~205~~	200	360
2nd place, silver medalist(s)	Aleksandr Pervi (URS)	74.20	152.5	~~157.5~~	157.5	157.5	190	200	~~205~~	200	357.5
3rd place, bronze medalist(s)	Nedelcho Kolev (BUL)	73.90	152.5	157.5	~~162.5~~	157.5	187.5	~~195~~	~~197.5~~	187.5	345
4	Julio Echenique (CUB)	73.35	145	~~150~~	~~150~~	145	182.5	~~187.5~~	~~187.5~~	182.5	327.5
5	Dragomir Cioroslan (ROU)	74.65	140	~~145~~	~~145~~	140	182.5	~~190~~	~~190~~	182.5	322.5
6	Tapio Kinnunen (FIN)	74.10	142.5	~~147.5~~	~~147.5~~	142.5	172.5	177.5	~~180~~	177.5	320
7	Bertil Sollevi (SWE)	74.75	130	135	137.5	137.5	172.5	~~177.5~~	~~177.5~~	172.5	310
8	Newton Burrowes (GBR)	74.85	130	~~135~~	~~135~~	130	167.5	~~172.5~~	172.5	172.5	302.5
9	Rogelio Weatherbee (MEX)	74.85	130	~~135~~	135	135	160	165	~~170~~	165	300
10	Vincenzo Pedicone (ITA)	73.70	~~130~~	130	~~135~~	130	160	165	~~167.5~~	165	295
11	Kevin Kennedy (GBR)	74.00	130	~~140~~	~~140~~	130	160	~~165~~	~~165~~	160	295
12	Dušan Mirković (YUG)	74.45	127.5	~~132.5~~	~~132.5~~	127.5	162.5	~~170~~	~~170~~	162.5	290
13	Damdinsürengiin Boldbayar (MGL)	73.90	~~127.5~~	~~127.5~~	127.5	127.5	155	~~162.5~~	~~162.5~~	155	282.5
14	Sampson Cosmas (NGR)	74.80	110	115	~~117.5~~	115	~~140~~	140	~~145~~	140	255
-	Günter Schliwka (GDR)	73.50	145	~~150~~	150	150	~~187.5~~	~~187.5~~	~~187.5~~	-	DNF
-	Mohamed Tarabulsi (LIB)	74.75	~~142.5~~	~~142.5~~	~~142.5~~	-	-	-	-	-	DNF

== New records ==
Snatch	160.0 kg	Asen Zlatev (BUL)	OR
Clean & Jerk	200.0 kg	Aleksandr Pervi (URS)	WR
Clean & Jerk	205.0 kg	Aleksandr Pervi (URS)	WR
Clean & Jerk	205.5 kg	Asen Zlatev (BUL)	WR
Total	357.5 kg	Aleksandr Pervi (URS)	WR
Total	360.0 kg	Asen Zlatev (BUL)	WR
