= Sergio Moreno =

Sergio Moreno may refer to:

- Sergi Moreno (born 1987), Andorran footballer
- Sergio Moreno (footballer, born 1992), Panamanian footballer
- Sergio Moreno (footballer, born 1999), Spanish footballer
- Sergio Moreno (weightlifter) (born 1950), Nicaraguan Olympic weightlifter
