= Shimaya =

Shimaya (written: 島屋) is a Japanese surname. Notable people with the surname include:

- Yatsunori Shimaya (島屋 八徳, born 1990), Japanese footballer
- Yatsuo Shimaya (島屋 八生, born 1953), Japanese weightlifter
