= Weightlifting at the 1980 Summer Olympics – Men's 100 kg =

Weightlifting at the Olympics

Men's 100 kg at the Games of the XXII Olympiad
- Venue: Izmailovo Sports Palace
- Date: 28 July 1980
- Competitors: 18 from 16 nations

Medalists
1st place, gold medalist(s)		Ota Zaremba	Czechoslovakia
2nd place, silver medalist(s)		Igor Nikitin	Soviet Union
3rd place, bronze medalist(s)		Alberto Blanco	Cuba

These are the results of the Men's Heavyweight I Weightlifting Event (– 100 kg) at the 1980 Olympic Weightlifting competition in Moscow. A total of 18 men competed in this event, limited to competitors with a maximum body weight of 100 kilograms.

Each weightlifter had three attempts for both the snatch and clean and jerk lifting methods. The total of the best successful lift of each method was used to determine the final rankings and medal winners. Competition took place on 28 July in the Izmailovo Sports Palace.

== Results ==
Rank	Name	Body weight	Snatch (kg)				Clean & Jerk (kg)				Total (kg)
Rank	Name	Body weight	1	2	3	Result	1	2	3	Result	Total (kg)
1st place, gold medalist(s)	Ota Zaremba (TCH)	99.15	175	~~180~~	180	180	205	210	215	215	395
2nd place, silver medalist(s)	Igor Nikitin (URS)	99.25	167.5	175	177.5	177.5	210	215	~~220~~	215	392.5
3rd place, bronze medalist(s)	Alberto Blanco (CUB)	98.15	167.5	172.5	~~175~~	172.5	207.5	212.5	~~220~~	212.5	385
4	Michael Henning (GDR)	98.35	165	~~170~~	~~170~~	165	212.5	217.5	~~222.5~~	217.5	382.5
5	János Sólyomvári (HUN)	98.25	~~175~~	175	~~180~~	175	~~205~~	205	~~212.5~~	205	380
6	Manfred Funke (GDR)	98.65	170	~~175~~	~~175~~	170	207.5	~~212.5~~	~~212.5~~	207.5	377.5
7	Anton Baraniak (TCH)	98.90	~~160~~	160	165	165	210	~~217.5~~	~~217.5~~	210	375
8	László Varga (HUN)	97.15	167.5	172.5	~~175~~	172.5	195	~~200~~	~~200~~	195	367.5
9	Michael Persson (SWE)	97.90	152.5	157.5	160	160	192.5	197.5	200	200	360
10	Pekka Niemi (FIN)	99.35	150	~~155~~	155	155	~~192.5~~	192.5	~~207.5~~	192.5	347.5
11	John Burns (GBR)	99.80	~~157.5~~	157.5	~~162.5~~	157.5	180	~~190~~	~~190~~	180	337.5
12	Birgir Borgþórsson (ISL)	95.95	142.5	147.5	~~150~~	147.5	182.5	~~187.5~~	~~187.5~~	182.5	330
13	Omar Yousfi (ALG)	98.55	~~132.5~~	132.5	140	140	172.5	180	~~185~~	180	320
14	Addison Dale (ZIM)	91.35	100	~~105~~	~~105~~	100	125	~~130~~	~~130~~	125	225
-	Plamen Asparukhov (BUL)	99.60	170	~~175~~	~~175~~	170	~~205~~	~~205~~	~~205~~	-	DNF
-	Raef Ftouni (LIB)	96.40	~~132.5~~	132.5	140	140	~~170~~	~~170~~	~~170~~	-	DNF
-	Franz Strizik (AUT)	98.55	~~155~~	~~155~~	~~155~~	-	-	-	-	-	DNF
-	Michel Broillet (SUI)	95.10	-	-	-	-	-	-	-	-	—N/a

== New records ==
Snatch	180.0 kg	Ota Zaremba (TCH)	OR
Clean & Jerk	217.5 kg	Michael Henning (GDR)	OR
Total	395.0 kg	Ota Zaremba (TCH)	OR
