= Stefan Jacobsson (weightlifter) =

Swedish weightlifter

Personal information
- Nationality: Swedish
- Born: 26 December 1947; Vännäs, Sweden
- Died: 23 January 2023 (aged 75)

Sport
- Sport: Weightlifting

Stefan Jacobsson (26 December 1947 – 23 January 2023) was a Swedish weightlifter. He competed in the men's light heavyweight event at the 1976 Summer Olympics.
