= 1910 World Weightlifting Championships =

International weightlifting competition

1910 Men's World Championships
- Host city: Vienna, Austria-Hungary
- Dates: June 4–6, 1910

The following is the result of the World Weightlifting Championships tournaments in year 1910.

== Tournament 1 ==
The first tournament (13th World Weightlifting Championships) was held in Düsseldorf, Germany from June 4 to June 6, 1910. There were 57 men in action from 5 nations.

Event	Gold	Silver	Bronze
Featherweight; 60 kg	Emil Kliment; Austria	Alfred Anschütz; Germany	Franz Schmitz; Germany
Lightweight; 70 kg	Eugen Ruhland; Germany	Karl Swoboda; Austria	Josef Schwabl; Austria
Middleweight; 80 kg	Hans Abraham; Germany	Karl Ackermann; Germany	Rudolf Oswald; Austria
Heavyweight +80 kg	Josef Grafl; Austria	Heinrich Rondi; Germany	Berthold Tandler; Austria

== Tournament 2 ==
The fourth tournament (14th World Weightlifting Championships) was held in Vienna, Austria-Hungary from October 9 to October 10, 1910. There were 15 men in action from 2 nations.

Event	Gold	Silver	Bronze
Middleweight; 80 kg	Leopold Hennermüller; Austria	Johann Eibel; Austria	Leopold Bartasek; Austria
Heavyweight +80 kg	Josef Grafl; Austria	Karl Swoboda; Austria	Berthold Tandler; Austria

== Medal table ==
Rank	Nation	Gold	Silver	Bronze	Total
1	Austria	4	3	5	12
2	Germany	2	3	1	6
Totals (2 entries)		6	6	6	18
