= Viktor Mazin =

Soviet weightlifter (1954–2022)

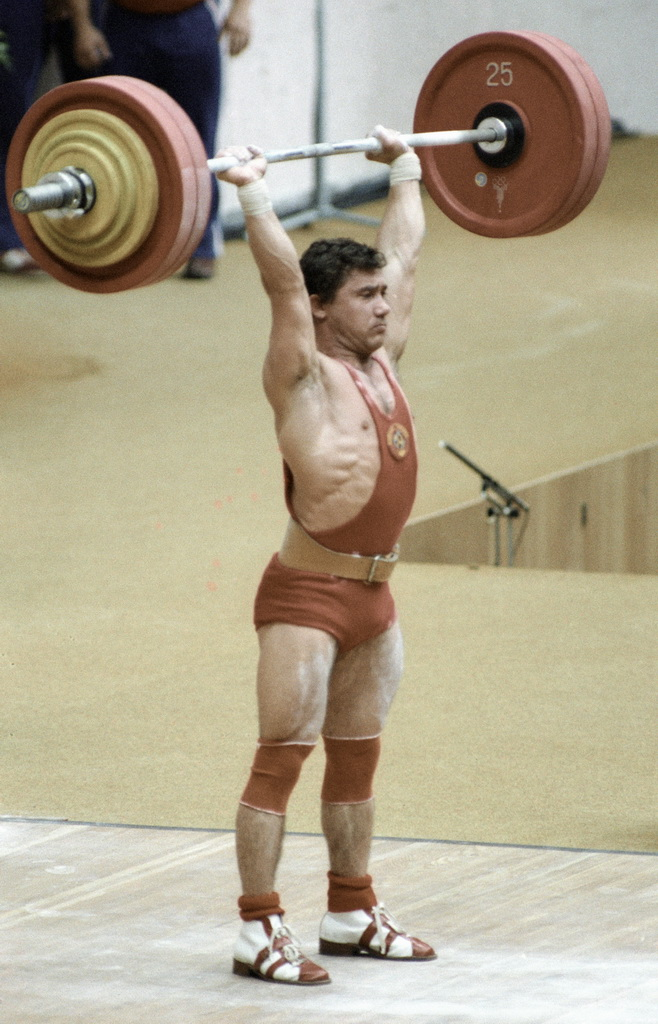
- Mazin at the 1980 Olympics

Personal information
- Born: 18 June 1954 Chernovskiye Kopi, Chita Oblast, Russian SFSR, Soviet Union
- Died: 8 January 2022 (aged 67) Minusinsk, Krasnoyarsk Krai, Russia
- Height: 156 cm (5 ft 1 in)
- Weight: 60 kg (132 lb)

Sport
- Sport: Weightlifting
- Club: Yenbek Shakhtinsk
Medal record
Representing Soviet Union
Olympic Games
| Gold medal – first place | 1980 Moscow | -60 kg |

Viktor Ivanovich Mazin (Russian: Виктор Иванович Мазин; 18 June 1954 – 8 January 2022) was a Russian featherweight weightlifter who competed for the Soviet Union. He won a gold medal at the 1980 Olympics in Moscow, setting five ratified world records in the process. Domestically, Mazin won one Soviet title in 1980, and placed second in 1979 and 1981. He retired in 1982 after winning a Soviet Cup. He died in Minusinsk on 8 January 2022, at the age of 67.
