= Bruno Lebrun =

French weightlifter

Personal information
- Nationality: French
- Born: 24 December 1956 (age 68); Houilles, France

Sport
- Sport: Weightlifting

Bruno Lebrun (born 24 December 1956) is a French weightlifter. He competed in the men's bantamweight event at the 1980 Summer Olympics.
