= Sydney Ikebaku =

Nigerian weightlifter

Personal information
- Nationality: Nigerian
- Born: 24 May 1956 (age 68)

Sport
- Sport: Weightlifting

Sydney Ikebaku (born 24 May 1956) is a Nigerian weightlifter. He competed in the men's featherweight event at the 1980 Summer Olympics.
