= 1908 World Weightlifting Championships =

International weightlifting competition

1909 Men's World Championships
- Host city: Frankfurt, Germany
- Dates: December 8–9, 1908

The 1908 Men's World Weightlifting Championships were held in Vienna, Austria-Hungary from December 8 to December 9, 1908. There were 23 men in action from 2 nations. It was the 11th World Weightlifting Championships.

All medals won by Austrian weightlifters, Johann Eibel won the middleweight class while Josef Grafl won the heavyweight division.

== Medal summary ==
Event	Gold	Silver	Bronze
Middleweight; 80 kg	Johann Eibel; Austria	Anton Nejedlik; Austria	Johann Staudinger; Austria
Heavyweight +80 kg	Josef Grafl; Austria	Berthold Tandler; Austria	Edmund Danzer; Austria

== Medal table ==
Rank	Nation	Gold	Silver	Bronze	Total
1	Austria	2	2	2	6
Totals (1 entries)		2	2	2	6
