= Bernhard Bachfisch =

German weightlifter

Personal information
- Nationality: German
- Born: 11 March 1953 (age 72); Regensburg, Germany

Sport
- Sport: Weightlifting

Bernhard Bachfisch (born 11 March 1953) is a German weightlifter. He competed in the men's bantamweight event at the 1976 Summer Olympics.
