= Porfirio de León =

Puerto Rican weightlifter (born 1956)

Personal information
- Nationality: Puerto Rican
- Born: 13 November 1956 (age 68)

Sport
- Sport: Weightlifting

Porfirio de León (born 13 November 1956) is a Puerto Rican weightlifter. He competed in the men's flyweight event at the 1976 Summer Olympics.
