= Naftaly Parrales =

Nicaraguan weightlifter

Personal information
- Nationality: Nicaraguan
- Born: 18 November 1938
- Died: 13 June 2002 (aged 63)

Sport
- Sport: Weightlifting

Naftaly Parrales (18 November 1938 – 13 June 2002) was a Nicaraguan weightlifter. He competed in the men's bantamweight event at the 1976 Summer Olympics.
