= Gerd Kennel =

German weightlifter

Personal information
- Nationality: German
- Born: 3 May 1952 (age 72); Völklingen, Germany

Sport
- Sport: Weightlifting

Gerd Kennel (born 3 May 1952) is a German weightlifter. He competed in the men's light heavyweight event at the 1976 Summer Olympics.
