= Vincenzo Pedicone =

Italian weightlifter

Personal information
- Nationality: Italian
- Born: 22 March 1956 (age 69); Montorio al Vomano, Italy

Sport
- Sport: Weightlifting

Vincenzo Pedicone (born 22 March 1956) is an Italian weightlifter. He competed in the men's middleweight event at the 1980 Summer Olympics.
