= Sampson Cosmas =

Nigerian weightlifter

Personal information
- Nationality: Nigerian
- Born: 22 July 1953 (age 71)

Sport
- Sport: Weightlifting

Sampson Cosmas (born 22 July 1953) is a Nigerian weightlifter.

== Professional life ==
He competed in the men's middleweight event at the 1980 Summer Olympics.
