= Petre Pavel =

Romanian weightlifter

Personal information
- Nationality: Romanian
- Born: 25 November 1957 (age 67); Bucharest, Romania

Sport
- Sport: Weightlifting

Petre Pavel (born 25 November 1957) is a Romanian weightlifter. He competed in the men's bantamweight event at the 1980 Summer Olympics.
