= Anatoly Kozlov =

Soviet weightlifter

Personal information
- Native name: Анатолий Козлов
- Born: February 23, 1955 (age 71) Taranay, Sakhalin Oblast, USSR

Sport
- Sport: Weightlifting
Medal record
Representing Soviet Union
World Championships
Gold medal – first place	1977 Stuttgart	-100 kg

Anatoly Vasilevich Kozlov (Russian: Анатолий Васильевич Козлов, born February 23, 1955) is a retired Russian heavyweight weightlifter.

== Career ==
In 1977, he won the Soviet, European and world titles and set three ratified world records, all in the total.

== Personal life ==
His son, Vasily, also became a competitive weightlifter.
