= Michael Hennig =

German weightlifter

Personal information
- Nationality: German
- Born: 14 July 1955 (age 69); Ebersbach, East Germany

Sport
- Sport: Weightlifting

Michael Hennig (born 14 July 1955) is a German weightlifter. He competed in the men's heavyweight I event at the 1980 Summer Olympics.
