= Boleslav Pachol =

Czech weightlifter

Personal information
- Nationality: Czech
- Born: 10 May 1948 (age 76); Karviná, Czechoslovakia

Sport
- Sport: Weightlifting

Boleslav Pachol (born 10 May 1948) is a Czech weightlifter. He competed in the men's flyweight event at the 1976 Summer Olympics.
