= Addison Dale =

Zimbabwean weightlifter (born 1942)

Personal information
- Nationality: Zimbabwean
- Born: 10 November 1942 (age 82)

Sport
- Sport: Weightlifting

Addison Brian Dale (born 10 November 1942) is a Zimbabwean former weightlifter. He competed in the men's heavyweight I event at the 1980 Summer Olympics.
