= Phillip Sue =

New Zealand weightlifter (born 1946)

Personal information
- Nationality: New Zealand
- Born: 3 September 1946 (age 78); Hastings, New Zealand

Sport
- Sport: Weightlifting

Phillip Sue (born 3 September 1946) is a New Zealand weightlifter. He competed in the men's lightweight event at the 1976 Summer Olympics.
