= Sam Walker (weightlifter) =

American weightlifter

Personal information
- Nationality: American
- Born: August 15, 1950 (age 75) Dallas, Texas, United States

Sport
- Sport: Weightlifting

Sam Walker (born August 15, 1950) is an American weightlifter. He competed in the men's super heavyweight event at the 1976 Summer Olympics.
