= Pertti Torikka =

Swedish weightlifter

Personal information
- Nationality: Swedish
- Born: 11 September 1954 (age 70); Kolari, Finland

Sport
- Sport: Weightlifting

Pertti Torikka (born 11 September 1954) is a Swedish weightlifter. He competed in the men's bantamweight event at the 1980 Summer Olympics. Born in Kolari, Finland, Torikka moved to Sweden in 1971 and received Swedish citizenship in 1974.
