= Samuel Bigler =

American weightlifter (born 1947)

Personal information
- Nationality: American
- Born: January 20, 1947 (age 79) Columbia, Pennsylvania, United States
- Died: July 1, 2025

Sport
- Sport: Weightlifting

Samuel Bigler (January 20, 1947 – July 1, 2025) was an American weightlifter. He competed in the men's light heavyweight event at the 1976 Summer Olympics.
