= László Varga (weightlifter) =

Hungarian weightlifter

Personal information
- Nationality: Hungarian
- Born: 7 April 1953 (age 71); Tét, Hungary

Sport
- Sport: Weightlifting

László Varga (born 7 April 1953) is a Hungarian weightlifter. He competed in the men's heavyweight I event at the 1980 Summer Olympics.
