= Ezequiel Sánchez =

Colombian weightlifter

Personal information
- Nationality: Colombian
- Born: 24 March 1949 (age 75)

Sport
- Sport: Weightlifting

Ezequiel Sánchez (born 24 March 1949) is a Colombian weightlifter. He competed in the men's bantamweight event at the 1976 Summer Olympics.
