= Ioannis Athanasiadis =

Greek weightlifter (born 1947)

Personal information
- Nationality: Greek
- Born: 6 February 1947 (age 78)

Sport
- Sport: Weightlifting

Ioannis Athanasiadis (born 6 February 1947) is a Greek weightlifter. He competed in the men's flyweight event at the 1976 Summer Olympics.
