= Gary Drinnon =

American weightlifter (born 1950)

Personal information
- Born: June 11, 1950 (age 76) Chattanooga, Tennessee, United States

Sport
- Sport: Weightlifting

Gary Drinnon (born June 11, 1950) is an American weightlifter. He competed in the men's heavyweight event at the 1976 Summer Olympics.
