= Faouaz Nadirin =

Syrian weightlifter

Personal information
- Nationality: Syrian
- Born: 24 April 1953 (age 72)

Sport
- Sport: Weightlifting

Faouaz Nadirin (born 24 April 1953) is a Syrian weightlifter. He competed in the men's featherweight event at the 1980 Summer Olympics.
