= Roland Chavigny =

French weightlifter

Personal information
- Nationality: French
- Born: 27 November 1950 (age 74); Villamblain, France

Sport
- Sport: Weightlifting

Roland Chavigny (born 27 November 1950) is a French weightlifter. He competed in the men's lightweight event at the 1976 Summer Olympics.
