= Aslanbek Yenaldiev =

Russian weightlifter

Personal information
- Born: 18 December 1947 Ardonsky District, North Ossetia-Alania Russia
- Died: 30 May 2015 (aged 67) Vladikavkaz, North Ossetia-Alania Russia

Sport
- Sport: Weightlifting
- Coached by: Rudolf Plyukfelder
Medal record
Representing the Soviet Union
World Weightlifting Championships
| Silver medal – second place | 1977 Stuttgart | Super heavyweight |
European Weightlifting Championships
| Silver medal – second place | 1977 Stuttgart | Super heavyweight |

Aslanbek Inalovich Yenaldiev (Russian: Асланбек Иналович Еналдиев, 18 December 1947 – 30 May 2015) was an Ossetian-Russian superheavyweight weightlifter. In 1977 he won silver medals at the European and world championships, as well as a Soviet title.

In retirement Yenaldiev continued competing in arm wrestling and trained weightlifters in his native Ossetia. He was married and had three daughters.
