= Serge Stresser =

French weightlifter (1953–2026)

Personal information
- Nationality: French
- Born: 28 September 1953 Haguenau, France
- Died: 10 February 2026 (aged 72) Schweighouse-sur-Moder, France

Sport
- Sport: Weightlifting

Serge Stresser (28 September 1953 – 10 February 2026) was a French weightlifter. He competed in the men's bantamweight event at the 1976 Summer Olympics. Stresser died on 10 February 2026, at the age of 72.
