= Tapio Kinnunen =

Finnish weightlifter (born 1954)

Personal information
- Nationality: Finnish
- Born: 18 January 1954 (age 71); Reisjärvi, Finland

Sport
- Sport: Weightlifting

Tapio Kinnunen (born 18 January 1954) is a Finnish weightlifter. He competed in the men's middleweight event at the 1980 Summer Olympics. Kinnunen moved to Sweden in 1975, and also has represented Sweden in competitions.
