= 1913 World Weightlifting Championships =

International weightlifting competition

1913 Men's World Championships
- Host city: Breslau, Germany
- Dates: July 28–29, 1913

The 1913 Men's World Weightlifting Championships were held in Breslau, Germany from July 28 to July 29, 1913. There were 40 men in action from 4 nations.

== Medal summary ==
Event	Gold	Silver	Bronze
Featherweight; 60 kg	Emil Kliment; Austria	Piotr Cherudzinski; Russia	Georg Vogel; Germany
Lightweight; 70 kg	Wilhelm Köhler; Germany	Karl Samfaß; Germany	Karl Swoboda; Austria
Middleweight; 80 kg	Leopold Hennermüller; Austria	Hans Abraham; Germany	Josef Buchegger; Austria
Heavyweight +80 kg	Josef Grafl; Austria	Berthold Tandler; Austria	Jan Krause; Russia

== Medal table ==
Rank	Nation	Gold	Silver	Bronze	Total
1	Austria	3	1	2	6
2	Germany	1	2	1	4
3	Russia	0	1	1	2
Totals (3 entries)		4	4	4	12
