= Constantin Chiru =

Romanian weightlifter

Personal information
- Nationality: Romanian
- Born: 4 September 1957 (age 67); Bucharest, Romania

Sport
- Sport: Weightlifting

Constantin Chiru (born 4 September 1957) is a Romanian weightlifter. He competed in the men's featherweight event at the 1980 Summer Olympics.
