= Mohamed Gouni =

Algerian weightlifter

Personal information
- Nationality: Algerian
- Born: 27 March 1947
- Died: 19 June 2019 (aged 72)

Sport
- Sport: Weightlifting

Mohamed Gouni (27 March 1947 – 19 June 2019) was an Algerian weightlifter. He competed in the men's featherweight event at the 1980 Summer Olympics. He later served as the national weightlifting coach.
