= Gennady Bessonov (weightlifter) =

Russian weightlifter (born 1954)

Personal information
- Born: 28 April 1954 (age 72) Shakhty, Russia

Sport
- Sport: Weightlifting
- Coached by: Viktor Dorokhin
Medal record
Representing the Soviet Union
World Weightlifting Championships
Gold medal – first place	1977 Stuttgart	-82.5 kg
Silver medal – second place	1978 Gettysburg	-90 kg
Gold medal – first place	1979 Saloniki	-90 kg
European Weightlifting Championships
Gold medal – first place	1977 Stuttgart	-82.5 kg
Bronze medal – third place	1980 Belgrade	-90 kg

Gennady Veniaminovich Bessonov (Russian: Геннадий Вениаминович Бессонов, born 28 April 1954) is a retired Russian heavyweight weightlifter who won world titles in 1977 and 1979. In 1981 he set three world records: one in the snatch and two in the clean and jerk. He retired in 1983 due to progressing back and hip injuries and became a police officer in his native Shakhty. In 1991 he graduated from the National Internal Affairs Academy, and from 1994 to 2005 headed a police department in Rostov Oblast. He retired from the police force in 2005 in the rank of colonel, and after that worked for the Shakhty City Administration.
