= Yanko Rusev =

Bulgarian weightlifter (born 1958)

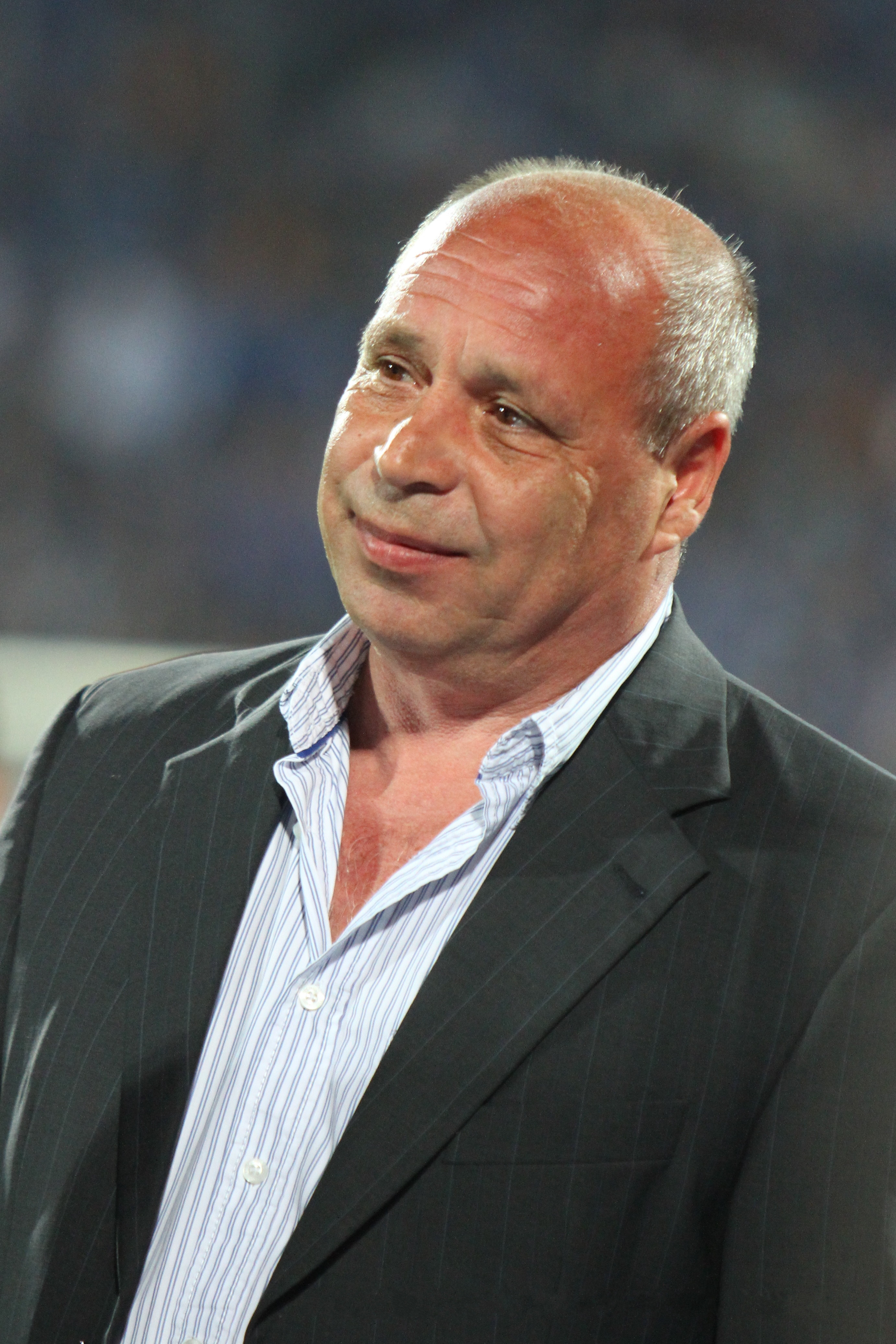
- Rusev in 2014

Personal information
- Nationality: Bulgarian
- Born: 1 December 1958 (age 67) Ivanski, Shumen Province, Bulgaria
- Occupation: Weightlifter

Sport
- Sport: Olympic weightlifting
Medal record
Men's weightlifting
Representing Bulgaria
Olympic Games
Gold medal – first place	1980 Moscow	67.5 kg
World Championships
Silver medal – second place	1977 Stuttgart	60 kg
Gold medal – first place	1978 Gettysburg	67.5 kg
Gold medal – first place	1979 Saloniki	67.5 kg
Gold medal – first place	1980 Moscow	67.5 kg
Gold medal – first place	1981 Lille	75 kg
Gold medal – first place	1982 Ljubljana	75 kg
Silver medal – second place	1983 Moscow	67.5 kg
European Championships
Silver medal – second place	1977 Stuttgart	60 kg
Gold medal – first place	1978 Havirov	67.5 kg
Gold medal – first place	1979 Varna	67.5 kg
Gold medal – first place	1980 Beograd	67.5 kg
Gold medal – first place	1981 Lille	75 kg
Gold medal – first place	1982 Ljubljana	75 kg
Silver medal – second place	1983 Moscow	67.5 kg
Friendship Games
Gold medal – first place	1984 Varna	67.5 kg
Friendship Cup
Gold medal – first place	1978 Moscow	67.5 kg
IWF World Cup Final
Bronze medal – third place	1980 Madrid	67,5 kg
Bronze medal – third place	1982 Halmstad	75 kg
IWF World Cup Winner
Gold medal – first place	1981 Vienna	75 kg
IWF World Cup
Gold medal – first place	1981 Athens	75 kg
Gold medal – first place	1982 Atlantic City	75 kg
Gold medal – first place	1983 Allentown	75 kg
Gold medal – first place	1984 Budapest	67,5 kg
Junior World Weightlifting Championships
Gold medal – first place	1978 Athens	67,5 kg
Bronze medal – third place	1977 Sofia	67.5 kg
European Junior Championships
Gold medal – first place	1978 Athens	67,5 kg
Bronze medal – third place	1977 Sofia	67.5 kg
Balkan Weightlifting Championships
Gold medal – first place	1976 Drăgășani	60 kg
Gold medal – first place	1977 Ankara	67,5 kg
Gold medal – first place	1978 Athens	67,5 kg
Bulgarian Weightlifting Championships
Gold medal – first place	1978 Veliko Tarnovo	67,5 kg
Gold medal – first place	1979 Sofia	67,5 kg
Gold medal – first place	1981 Vidin	75 kg
Gold medal – first place	1982 Varna	75 kg
Silver medal – second place	1983 Varna	75 kg

Yanko Rusev (Bulgarian: Янко Русев, born 1 December 1958) is a former Olympic weightlifter for Bulgaria.

In 1993 he was elected member of the International Weightlifting Federation Hall of Fame. He was named the 1981 Sportsman of the Year for Bulgaria. In 2019 he was awarded the highest state award of Bulgaria in the field of sport - the Wreath of the winner. Rusev is an Olympic, five-time world and five-time European champion and multiple world record holder. He is the winner of the World Cup in 1981 and a gold medalist in cat. 67.5 at the strongest competition in the world in 1984 - the Friendship Games. Yanko is a three-time Balkan champion and a four-time champion of Bulgaria. Rusev is also world and European junior champion. He was named the BTA Best Balkan Athlete of the Year in 1979.

== Early life ==
He was born on December 1, 1958, in Ivanski, Shumen. At 15, he attempted to enter the sport school "Olympian Hopes" (Bulgarian: Олимпийски Hадежди) in Sofia, but was turned down on the grounds that he was a "hopeless" weightlifter.

== Training ==
Rusev first began training for soccer and wrestling. Afterwards, he took an interest in weightlifting. During his education at 19, Ivan Abadzhiev noticed him, and soon Rusev was weightlifting in the world games at Stuttgart, and won a silver medal.

== Weightlifting achievements ==
- Olympic champion (1980 - 67,5 kg);
- Five-time senior world champion (1978, 79 and 80 - 67,5 kg, 81 and 1982 – 75 kg);
- Twice silver medalist in Senior World Championships (1977 – 60 kg and 1983 - 67,5 kg);
- Five-time senior European champion (1978, 79, 80 - 67,5 kg 81 and 1982 75 kg);
- Twice silver medalist in Senior European Championships (1977 – 60 kg and 1983 - 67,5 kg);
- Set 36 world records during his career.
- Sportsman of the year Bulgaria 1981

== World Records by Yanko Rusev ==
- 9/19/1977 Clean and Jerk 165 Featherweight Stuttgart
- 7/18/1978 Clean and Jerk 179 Lightweight Athens
- 10/5/1978 Clean and Jerk 180 Lightweight Gettysburg
- 5/22/1979 Snatch 145 Lightweight Varna
- 5/22/1979 Snatch 146 Lightweight Varna
- 5/22/1979 Clean and Jerk 181.5 Lightweight Varna
- 7/9/1979 Snatch 147 Lightweight Sofia
- 7/9/1979 Clean and Jerk 185.5 Lightweight Sofia
- 7/9/1979 Total (2) 325 Lightweight Sofia
- 11/6/1979 Clean and Jerk 187.5 Lightweight Saloniki
- 11/6/1979 Total (2) 332.5 Lightweight Saloniki
- 2/1/1980 Snatch 147.5 Lightweight Varna
- 2/1/1980 Clean and Jerk 188 Lightweight Varna
- 2/1/1980 Total (2) 335 Lightweight Varna
- 4/28/1980 Snatch 148 Lightweight Beograd
- 4/28/1980 Clean and Jerk 190 Lightweight Beograd
- 4/28/1980 Total (2) 337.5 Lightweight Beograd
- 7/23/1980 Clean and Jerk 195 Lightweight Moscow
- 7/23/1980 Total (2) 342.5 Lightweight Moscow
- 9/16/1981 Clean and Jerk 206 Middleweight Lille
- 4/8/1982 Clean and Jerk 206.5 Middleweight Varna
- 9/2/1982 Total (2) 365 Middleweight Ljubljana
- 9/22/1982 Clean and Jerk 208 Middleweight Ljubljana
- 9/22/1982 Clean and Jerk 209 Middleweight Ljubljana
- 9/22/1982 Total (2) 362.5 Middleweight Ljubljana
