= Michael Persson =

Swedish weightlifter

Personal information
- Nationality: Swedish
- Born: 28 April 1959 (age 67) Sorsele, Sweden

Sport
- Sport: Weightlifting

Achievements and titles
- Olympic finals: 1980 Summer Olympics

Michael Persson (born 28 April 1959) is a Swedish weightlifter. He competed in the men's heavyweight I event at the 1980 Summer Olympics.
