= Faisal Matloub =

Iraqi weightlifter

Personal information
- Full name: Faisal Matloub Fathi
- Nationality: Iraqi
- Born: 1948 (age 77–78)

Sport
- Sport: Weightlifting

Faisal Matloub Fathi (born 1948) is an Iraqi former weightlifter. He competed in the men's featherweight event at the 1980 Summer Olympics.

Born in 1948, Fathi grew up in Iraq and became a competitive weightlifter, weighing 60 kilograms (130 lb) he was classified as a featherweight. Considered one of Iraq's weightlifting pioneers, he was a member of the Armed Forces and held the title of Champion of Iraq and the Armed Forces for 15 years. He won international tournaments in Poland and Germany in 1972 and was fourth at the World Mini Championship held in the Soviet Union. Fathi was an Arab Games champion from 1974 to 1976, won the World Military Championship in Baghdad in 1976, and competed at the 1980 Summer Olympics in Moscow, where he placed ninth.
