= Franz Strizik =

Austrian weightlifter

Personal information
- Nationality: Austrian
- Born: 31 December 1953 (age 71); Loosdorf, Austria

Sport
- Sport: Weightlifting

Franz Strizik (born 31 December 1953) is an Austrian weightlifter. He competed in the men's heavyweight I event at the 1980 Summer Olympics.
