= Rajendra Pradhan =

Nepalese weightlifter

Personal information
- Nationality: Nepalese
- Born: 17 October 1954 (age 70)

Sport
- Sport: Weightlifting

Rajendra Pradhan (born 17 October 1954) is a Nepalese weightlifter. He competed in the men's featherweight event at the 1980 Summer Olympics.
