= Josef Grafl =

Austrian weightlifter

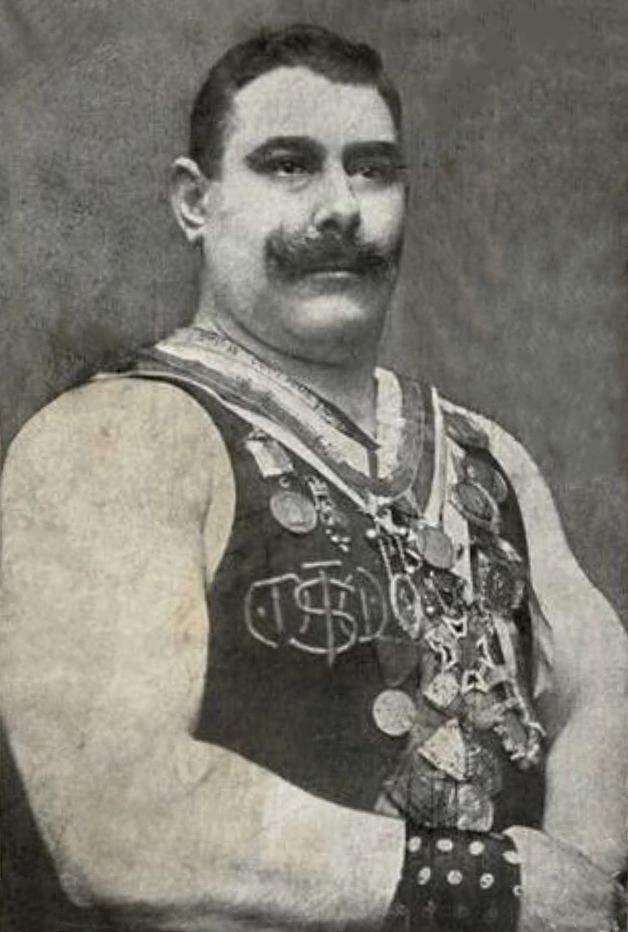

Personal information
- Born: 1872 Vienna, Austria
- Died: 1915 (aged 42–43) Tribuswinkel, Austria

Sport
- Sport: Weightlifting
Medal record
Representing Austria
World Championships
Gold medal – first place	1908 Vienna	+80 kg
Gold medal – first place	1909 Vienna	+80 kg
Gold medal – first place	1910 Düsseldorf	+80 kg
Gold medal – first place	1910 Vienna	+80 kg
Gold medal – first place	1911 Stuttgart	+80 kg
Gold medal – first place	1913 Breslau	+80 kg
Silver medal – second place	1904 Vienna	Open
Silver medal – second place	1911 Vienna	+80 kg

Josef Grafl (1872–1915) was the Austrian heavyweight weightlifter who won six world titles in 1908–13.
