= Brian Strange =

British weightlifter

Personal information
- Nationality: British
- Born: 29 January 1954 (age 71)

Sport
- Sport: Weightlifting

Brian Strange (born 29 January 1954) is a British weightlifter. He competed in the men's heavyweight event at the 1976 Summer Olympics.
