= Mehmet Suvar =

Turkish weightlifter

Personal information
- Nationality: Turkish
- Born: 22 November 1946 (age 78); Adana, Turkey

Sport
- Sport: Weightlifting

Mehmet Suvar (born 22 November 1946) is a Turkish weightlifter. He competed in the men's light heavyweight event at the 1976 Summer Olympics.
