= Ahmed Mahmoud Mashall =

Egyptian weightlifter

Personal information
- Nationality: Egyptian
- Born: 26 July 1948 (age 76)

Sport
- Sport: Weightlifting

Ahmed Mahmoud Mashall (born 26 July 1948) is an Egyptian weightlifter. He competed in the men's bantamweight event at the 1976 Summer Olympics.
