= Gottfried Langthaler =

Austrian weightlifter

Personal information
- Nationality: Austrian
- Born: 20 March 1953 (age 72); Unterweißenbach, Austria

Sport
- Sport: Weightlifting

Gottfried Langthaler (born 20 March 1953) is an Austrian weightlifter. He competed in the men's lightweight event at the 1976 Summer Olympics.
