= Yvon Coussin =

French weightlifter

Personal information
- Nationality: French
- Born: 30 April 1950; Bollène, France
- Died: 4 December 2009 (aged 59)

Sport
- Sport: Weightlifting

Yvon Coussin (30 April 1950 – 4 December 2009) was a French weightlifter. He competed in the men's middle heavyweight event at the 1976 Summer Olympics.
