= Gustavo Quintana =

Colombian weightlifter

Personal information
- Nationality: Colombian
- Born: 20 May 1954 (age 70)

Sport
- Sport: Weightlifting

Gustavo Quintana (born 20 May 1954) is a Colombian weightlifter. He competed in the men's flyweight event at the 1976 Summer Olympics.
