= Rolf Larsen (weightlifter) =

Norwegian weightlifter

Personal information
- Nationality: Norwegian
- Born: 10 December 1948 (age 76) Skien, Norway

Sport
- Sport: Weightlifting

Rolf Larsen (born 10 December 1948) is a Norwegian weightlifter. He competed in the men's middle heavyweight event at the 1976 Summer Olympics.
