= Johnny Helsing =

Swedish weightlifter

Personal information
- Nationality: Swedish
- Born: 8 October 1955 (age 69); Hofors, Sweden

Sport
- Sport: Weightlifting

Johnny Helsing (born 8 October 1955) is a Swedish weightlifter. He competed in the men's bantamweight event at the 1980 Summer Olympics.
