= Yatsuo Shimaya =

Japanese weightlifter (born 1953)

Personal information
- Nationality: Japanese
- Born: 6 September 1953 (age 71)

Sport
- Sport: Weightlifting

Yatsuo Shimaya (島屋 八生, Shimaya Yatsuo; born 6 September 1953) is a Japanese weightlifter. He competed in the men's lightweight event at the 1976 Summer Olympics.
