= Sergio Moreno (weightlifter) =

Nicaraguan weightlifter

Personal information
- Nationality: Nicaraguan
- Born: 18 July 1950 (age 74)

Sport
- Sport: Weightlifting

Sergio Moreno (born 18 July 1950) is a Nicaraguan weightlifter. He competed in the men's lightweight event at the 1976 Summer Olympics.
