= Rafael Ortega (weightlifter) =

Dominican Republic weightlifter (born 1953)

Personal information
- Nationality: Dominican
- Born: 14 October 1953 (age 71)

Sport
- Sport: Weightlifting

Rafael Ortega (born 14 October 1953) is a Dominican Republic weightlifter. He competed in the men's flyweight event at the 1976 Summer Olympics.
