= Manfred Funke =

German weightlifter (born 1955)

Personal information
- Nationality: East German
- Born: 22 August 1955 (age 69); Zwenkau, East Germany

Sport
- Sport: Weightlifting

Manfred Funke (born 22 August 1955) is a German weightlifter. He competed in the men's heavyweight I event at the 1980 Summer Olympics representing East Germany.
