= Bertil Sollevi =

Swedish weightlifter

Personal information
- Nationality: Swedish
- Born: 15 February 1956 (age 69); Malmö, Sweden

Sport
- Sport: Weightlifting

Bertil Sollevi (born 15 February 1956) is a Swedish weightlifter. He competed at the 1980 Summer Olympics and the 1984 Summer Olympics.
