= Igor Nikitin (weightlifter) =

Soviet weightlifter

Medal record

Representing Soviet Union

Men's weightlifting

Olympic Games
Silver medal – second place	1980 Moscow	100 Kg

Igor Nikitin (born February 29, 1952) is a Soviet weightlifter. He won the Silver medal in 100 kg category in the 1980 Summer Olympics in Moscow.
