= Marek Seweryn =

Polish weightlifter (born 1957)

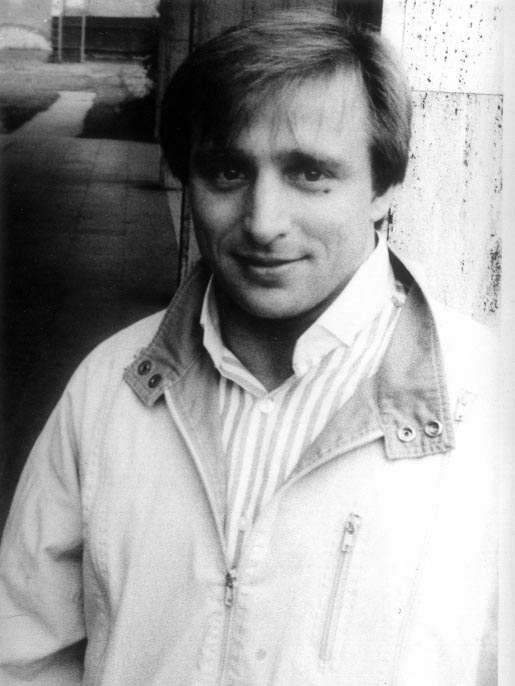
- Marek Seweryn

Medal record

Representing Poland

Weightlifting

Olympic Games
Bronze medal – third place	1980 Moscow, Soviet Union	-60 kg

World Championships
Silver medal – second place	1978 Gettysburg, United States	-56 kg
Gold medal – first place	1979 Saloniki, Greece	-60 kg
Bronze medal – third place	1980 Moscow, Soviet Union	-60 kg
Bronze medal – third place	1986 Sofia, Bulgaria	-67.5 kg

European Championships
Gold medal – first place	1978 Havířov, Czechoslovakia	-56 kg
Bronze medal – third place	1985 Katowice, Poland	-67.5 kg

Marek Seweryn (born 17 October 1957 in Katowice) is a Polish weightlifter.
