= Krasimir Drandarov =

Bulgarian weightlifter

Personal information
- Nationality: Bulgarian
- Born: 20 March 1955 (age 70)

Sport
- Sport: Weightlifting

Krasimir Drandarov (Bulgarian: Красимир Дръндаров, born 20 March 1955) is a Bulgarian weightlifter. He competed in the men's light heavyweight event at the 1980 Summer Olympics.
