= 1909 World Weightlifting Championships =

International sports competition

1909 Men's World Championships
- Host city: Vienna, Austria-Hungary
- Dates: October 3 and December 2, 1909

The Men's World Weightlifting Championships were held in Vienna, Austria-Hungary from October 3 and December 2, 1909. There were 23 men in action from 3 nations. It was the 12th World Weightlifting Championships.

All medals won by Austrian weightlifters, Johann Eibel won the middleweight class while Josef Grafl won the heavyweight division.

== Medal summary ==
Event	Gold	Silver	Bronze
Middleweight; 80 kg	Johann Eibel; Austria	Josef Hofböck; Austria	Anton Lenz; Austria
Heavyweight +80 kg	Josef Grafl; Austria	Karl Swoboda; Austria	Berthold Tandler; Austria

== Medal table ==
Rank	Nation	Gold	Silver	Bronze	Total
1	Austria	2	2	2	6
Totals (1 entries)		2	2	2	6
