= Van Helsing (disambiguation) =

Abraham Van Helsing is a character in Dracula media.

Van Helsing may also refer to:

- Van Helsing (film), a 2004 action/horror film
  - Gabriel Van Helsing, a character in Van Helsing media
  - Van Helsing (video game), a video game based on the 2004 film
  - Van Helsing: The London Assignment, the animated film
  - Van Helsing: From Beneath the Rue Morgue, a one-shot comic book from Dark Horse Comics, based on the film.
- The Incredible Adventures of Van Helsing, a 2013 video game
- Jan van Helsing or Jan Udo Holey (born 1967), controversial German author
- Mr. Eric Van Helsing, a character in the Young Dracula universe
- Ronnie Van Helsing, a character in Sword of Dracula media
- Rachel van Helsing, a Marvel comic book character
- Van Helsing (TV series), a 2016 American television horror series

== See also ==
- Helsing (disambiguation)
- Hellsing, a Japanese manga series
