= Jean-Claude Chavigny =

French weightlifter

Personal information
- Nationality: French
- Born: 3 July 1952 (age 72); Orléans, France

Sport
- Sport: Weightlifting

Jean-Claude Chavigny (born 3 July 1952) is a French weightlifter. He competed at the 1976 Summer Olympics and the 1980 Summer Olympics.
