= Rolf Milser =

German weightlifter (born 1951)

Personal information
- Born: 28 June 1951 (age 75) Bernburg, East Germany
- Height: 1.70 m (5 ft 7 in)
- Weight: 82–98 kg (181–216 lb)

Sport
- Sport: Weightlifting
- Club: VfL Duisburg-Süd
Medal record
Representing West Germany
Olympic Games
Gold medal – first place	1984 Los Angeles	-100 kg
World championships
Bronze medal – third place	1974 Manila	-82.5 kg
Silver medal – second place	1977 Stuttgart	-90 kg
Gold medal – first place	1978 Gettysburg	-90 kg
Silver medal – second place	1979 Thessaloniki	-90 kg
Gold medal – first place	1984 Los Angeles	-100 kg

Rolf Milser (born 28 June 1951) is a retired German weightlifter. He competed at the 1972, 1976 and 1984 Olympics, missing the 1980 Games due to their boycott by West Germany, and won the gold medal in the heavyweight I class in 1984. Milser won two world titles (in 1978 and 1984, combined with the Olympics) and set two world records in the clean & jerk, in 1976 and 1979. He also won a European title in 1979.
