= Béla Oláh =

Hungarian weightlifter

Personal information
- Nationality: Hungarian
- Born: 27 March 1956 (age 69); Nyírvasvári, Hungary

Sport
- Sport: Weightlifting

Béla Oláh (born 27 March 1956) is a Hungarian weightlifter. He competed at the 1980 Summer Olympics and the 1988 Summer Olympics.
