= Stefan Dimitrov (weightlifter) =

Bulgarian weightlifter (1957–2011)

Medal record

Representing Bulgaria

Men's weightlifting

Olympic Games
Silver medal – second place	1980 Moscow	60 Kg

Stefan Dimitrov (December 9, 1957 – June 2011) was a Bulgarian weightlifter. He won the Silver medal in 60 kg category in the 1980 Summer Olympics in Moscow.
