= Petr Pavlásek =

Czech weightlifter (1947–2023)

Personal information
- Nationality: Czech
- Born: 31 January 1947 České Budějovice, Czechoslovakia
- Died: 3 January 2023 (aged 75) Týn nad Vltavou, Czech Republic

Sport
- Sport: Weightlifting

Petr Pavlásek (31 January 1947 – 3 January 2023) was a Czech weightlifter.

== Career ==
Pavlásek competed at the 1972 Summer Olympics (6th place) and the 1976 Summer Olympics (disqualified). He held many national records and titles.

== Death ==
Petr Pavlásek died on 3 January 2023 (aged 76) In Týn nad Vltavou, Czech Republic.

It is currently unknown on how he died.
