= Günter Schliwka =

German weightlifter (1956–2023)

Personal information
- Nationality: German
- Born: 9 May 1956; Wolmirstedt, East Germany
- Died: 28 August 2023 (aged 67); Niedere Börde, Germany

Sport
- Sport: Weightlifting

Günter Schliwka (9 May 1956 – 28 August 2023) was a German weightlifter. He competed in the men's middleweight event at the 1980 Summer Olympics. Schliwka died in September 2023, at the age of 67.
