= Werner Schraut =

German weightlifter

Personal information
- Nationality: German
- Born: 25 April 1941; Groß-Umstadt, Germany
- Died: 22 September 2018 (aged 77); Groß-Umstadt, Germany

Sport
- Sport: Weightlifting

Werner Schraut (25 April 1941 – 22 September 2018) was a German weightlifter. He competed at the 1972 Summer Olympics and the 1976 Summer Olympics.
