= Paweł Rabczewski =

Polish weightlifter (born 1949)

Personal information
- Nationality: Polish
- Born: 20 November 1949 (age 75); Vilnius, Lithuanian SSR, Soviet Union

Sport
- Sport: Weightlifting

Paweł Rabczewski (born 20 November 1949) is a Polish weightlifter. He competed in the men's light heavyweight event at the 1980 Summer Olympics.

He is the father of Doda.
