= Tadeusz Dembończyk =

Polish weightlifter (1955–2004)

Medal record

Representing Poland

Men's weightlifting

Olympic Games
Bronze medal – third place	1980 Moscow	56 Kg

Tadeusz Dembonczyk (23 December 1955 – 11 February 2004) was a Polish weightlifter. He won the Bronze medal 56 kg in the 1980 Summer Olympics in Moscow. He was awarded the Bronze after he tied with Andreas Letz after both lifted 265 kg in total and they had weighted 55.6 kg before the competition and were reweighed and Dembonczyk was awarded the bronze.
