= György Rehus-Uzor =

Hungarian weightlifter (1946–2020)

Personal information
- Nationality: Hungarian
- Born: 10 July 1946; Budapest, Hungary
- Died: 20 August 2020 (aged 74); Kőszeg, Hungary

Sport
- Sport: Weightlifting

György Rehus-Uzor (10 July 1946 – 20 August 2020) was a Hungarian weightlifter. He competed in the men's middle heavyweight event at the 1976 Summer Olympics, finishing in fourth place.
