= Grzegorz Cziura =

Polish weightlifter (1952–2004)

Olympic medal record

Men's weightlifting

Representing Poland
Silver medal – second place	1976 Montreal	bantamweight

Grzegorz Cziura (3 January 1952 in Knurów – 17 July 2004 in Siemianowice Śląskie) was a Polish weightlifter who competed in the 1972 Summer Olympics and in the 1976 Summer Olympics.
