= Helmut Losch =

German weightlifter

Olympic medal record

Men's weightlifting
Bronze medal – third place	1976 Montreal	+110 kg class

Helmut Losch (12 October 1947 – 10 January 2005) was a world class East German weightlifter from the 1970s.

Losch competed at the 1972 Summer Olympics and finished fourth in the heavyweight event. Four years later at the 1976 Summer Olympics he won the bronze medal in the super-heavyweight class.

Losch was born in Barth and died in Stralsund.
