= András Stark =

Hungarian weightlifter (born 1949)

Personal information
- Nationality: Hungarian
- Born: 27 November 1949 (age 75); Tarján, Hungary

Sport
- Sport: Weightlifting

András Stark (born 27 November 1949) is a Hungarian weightlifter. He competed at the 1972 Summer Olympics and the 1976 Summer Olympics.
