= Ferenc Antalovics =

Hungarian weightlifter (born 1953)

Personal information
- Nationality: Hungarian
- Born: 9 July 1953 (age 71); Csepreg, Hungary

Sport
- Sport: Weightlifting

Ferenc Antalovics (born 9 July 1953) is a Hungarian weightlifter. He competed at the 1976 Summer Olympics and the 1980 Summer Olympics.
