= Yury Zaitsev (weightlifter) =

Russian weightlifter (1951–2022)

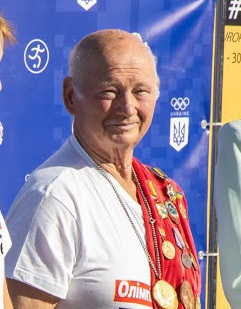
- Zaitsev in 2020

Personal information
- Born: 17 January 1951 Pobedino, Sakhalin Oblast, Russian SFSR, USSR
- Died: 30 September 2022 (aged 71) Dnipro, Ukraine

Sport
- Sport: Weightlifting
Medal record
Representing the Soviet Union
Men's Weightlifting
Olympic Games
Gold medal – first place	1976 Montreal	-110 kg

Yury Konstantinovich Zaitsev (Russian: Юрий Константинович Зайцев; 17 January 1951 – 30 September 2022) was a Russian weightlifter who competed for the Soviet Union. He won a gold medal in the men's 110 kg division at the 1976 Summer Olympics in Montreal.
