= György Kőszegi =

Hungarian weightlifter (1950–2001)

Olympic medal record

Men's weightlifting

Representing Hungary
Silver medal – second place	1976 Montreal	flyweight

György Kőszegi (12 September 1950 – 13 December 2001) was a Hungarian weightlifter who competed in the 1976 Summer Olympics and in the 1980 Summer Olympics. He was born in Nyíregyháza. At the 1976 Olympic Games, he won the silver medal.
