= Péter Baczakó =

Hungarian weightlifter (1951–2008)

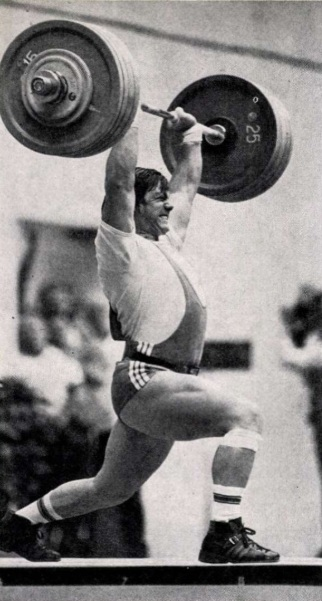
- Péter Baczakó (1951 – 2008)

Medal record

Men's weightlifting

Representing Hungary

Olympic Games
Gold medal – first place	1980 Moscow	-90 kg
Bronze medal – third place	1976 Montreal	-82.5 kg

Péter Baczakó (born 27 September 1951 in Ercsi – d. 1 April 2008 in Budapest) was a Hungarian weightlifter.

He won a bronze medal at the 1976 Summer Olympics and a gold medal at the 1980 Summer Olympics. Overall Baczako won a total of 23 medals, including four gold, at world and European championships from 1973 to 1982. He spent his whole career at the Budapest club BKV-Elore, where he became a coach after he retired from competing.

Peter Baczako died on April 1, 2008, in Budapest of cancer. He had also been diagnosed with muscular dystrophy and spent his last months in a wheelchair.
