= Jürgen Heuser =

German weightlifter

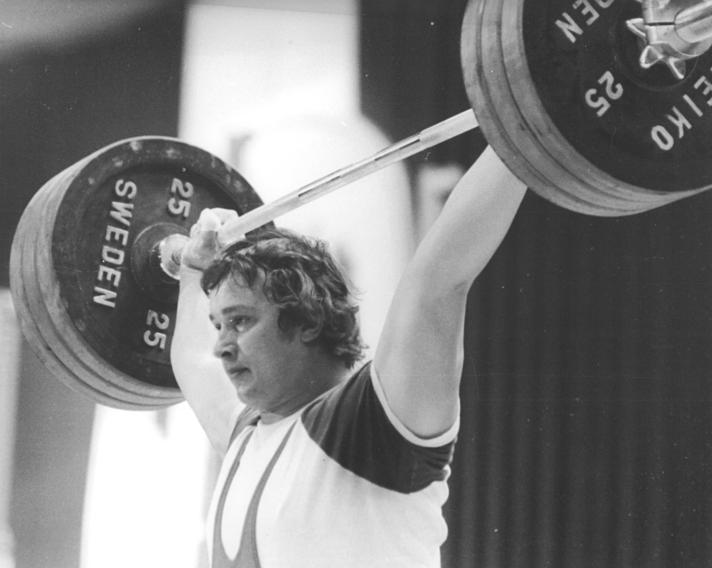
- Jürgen Heuser

Medal record

Men's weightlifting

Representing East Germany
Silver medal – second place	1980 Moscow	+110 kg class

Jürgen Heuser (born 13 March 1953 in Barth, Mecklenburg-Vorpommern) is a German weightlifter.

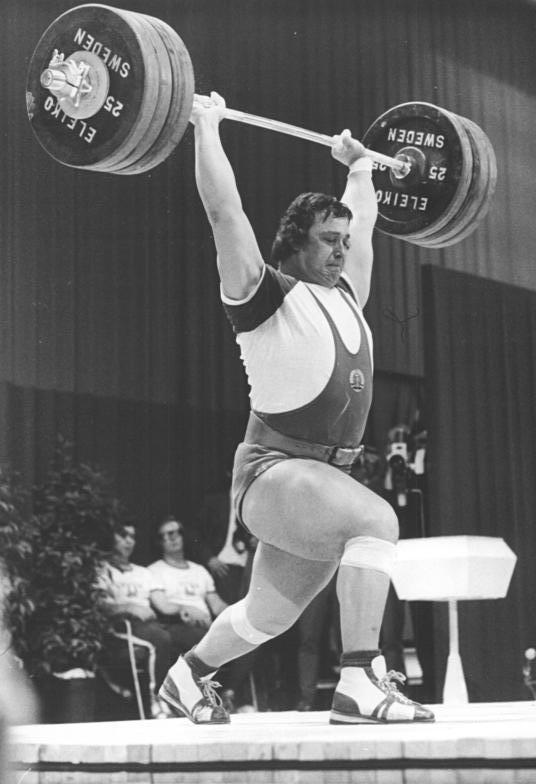
Jürgen Heuser at 1980 GDR Championships

In 1978, participating for the German Democratic Republic, he won the World Championship in Gettysburg, Pennsylvania. At the 1980 Summer Olympics in Moscow he won a silver medal in the +110 kg class.
