= Michel Broillet =

Swiss weightlifter

Personal information
- Nationality: Swiss
- Born: 15 July 1944 (age 80)

Sport
- Sport: Weightlifting

Michel Broillet (born 15 July 1944) is a Swiss weightlifter. He competed in the men's middle heavyweight event at the 1976 Summer Olympics.
