= Leif Nilsson (weightlifter) =

Swedish weightlifter (born 1952)

Personal information
- Nationality: Swedish
- Born: 16 November 1952 (age 72); Hässleholm, Sweden

Sport
- Sport: Weightlifting

Leif Nilsson (born 16 November 1952) is a Swedish weightlifter. He competed at the 1976 Summer Olympics and the 1980 Summer Olympics. He won gold medal in snatch 175 kg at world championship 1978 in Gettysburg, 4th place in total 387,5 kg.

Nilsson was born in Tormestorp and represented Stockholmspolisens IF and Sundbybergs TK.
