= World Weightlifting Championships =

International weightlifting competition

- Status: Active
- Genre: Sports event
- Frequency: Annual, apart from Summer Olympic years
- Inaugurated: 28 March 1891
- Founder: Weightlifting association of six different countries
- Most recent: 2025
- Previous event: 2024
- Next event: 2026
- Organiser: IWF
- Member: 193
- Website: https://iwf.sport/events/world-championships/
- 2026

The World Weightlifting Championships is an international weightlifting competition, currently held annually (except for years of the Summer Olympic Games) by the International Weightlifting Federation (IWF). The predecessor organization of the IWF was founded in 1905, but World Championship events began before its foundation. The first recognized World Championship event was held in 1891, and was won by Edward Lawrence Levy of England.

== Organization ==
1. Before 1905 : No World Federation.
2. 1905 - 1913: Amateur Athleten Weltunion (Amateur Athletes World Union).
3. 1920 - 1971: Fédération Haltérophile International (FHI).
4. 1972 - present: International Weightlifting Federation (IWF).

== Categories ==
=== Current ===
Athletes today compete in a total of 16 weight categories (8 for men and 8 for women):

- Men categories: 60 kg, 65 kg, 71 kg, 79 kg, 88 kg, 94 kg, 110 kg and +110 kg.
- Women categories: 48 kg, 53 kg, 58 kg, 63 kg, 69 kg, 77 kg, 86 kg and +86 kg.

=== History ===
1. Before 1905: Open
2. 1905 - 1912: 3 Men
3. 1913 - 1946: 5 Men
4. 1947 - 1950: 6 Men
5. 1951 - 1968: 7 Men
6. 1969 - 1976: 9 Men
7. 1977 - 1986: 10 Men
8. 1987 - 1992: 10 Men + 9 Women
9. 1993 - 1997: 10 Men + 9 Women (Changes in weights)
10. 1998 - 2016: 8 Men + 7 Women
11. 2017: 8 Men + 8 Women
12. 2018 - 2024: 10 Men + 10 Women
13. 2025 - 31 July 2026: 8 Men + 8 Women
14. 1 August 2026 - present: 8 Men + 8 Women (Changes in weights)

== Tie-Break ==
1. Before 1920: No
2. 1920 - 2016: Bodyweight Advantage (Removed since 2017)
3. 2017 - present: Earlier successful attempt (Second criteria since mid of 1980s - 2016)

== Format ==
1. 1891 - 1904: Various lifts including dumbbell and one-handed lifts.
2. 1905: Four lifts including right-hand snatch, left-hand snatch, one-hand clean & jerk, two-hand press.
3. 1920: Three lifts including one-hand snatch, one-hand clean & jerk, two-hand clean & jerk.
4. 1924: Five lifts.
5. 1928 - 1972: Three lifts (1928 - 1935: Was standarded).
6. 1973 - present: Two lifts.
- Press: Clean & Press (No overhead press)

== Team points systems ==
1. 1948: Team scoring approved in London Olympics.
2. 1949: First implementation 5-3-1.
3. 1957: Expended to 6 places 10-6-4-3-2-1.
4. 1958: Revised 7-5-4-3-2-1.
5. 1973: Expended to 10 places 12-9-8-7-6-5-4-3-2-1 (Total only).
6. 1977: Lifts results added (Snatch , Clean & jerk, Total).
7. 1984: Expended to 15 places 16-14-13-12-11-10-9-8-7-6-5-4-3-2-1.
8. 1997: Expended to 25 places 28-25-23-22-21-20-19-18-17-16-15-14-13-12-11-10-9-8-7-6-5-4-3-2-1.

== Competitions ==
Editions:

- The weightlifting tournaments held during Summer Olympics in 1964, 1968, 1972, 1976, 1980 and 1984 are counted as World Weightlifting Championships of the corresponding year.
- 1992 and 1996 Women only.
- 1891-1913 Wild (Unofficial / Spontaneous) World Championship. In 1983, it was approved that championships held before 1920 be recognized as official. Olympedia considers them unofficial. It may be better not to include them in the numerical count.
- 1920-1938 Irregular World Championship.
- Some of editions considered also as continental (Asia and Europe) championship.

Number		Year	Dates	Host	Men		Women	
M	W	Year	Dates	Host	Athletes	Countries	Athletes	Countries
Men
Wild World Championship (1891-1913)
1891 - 1968 medals were awarded for total only.
1	—	1891	28 March	London, United Kingdom	7	6	—	—
2	—	1898	31 July – 1 August	Vienna, Austria	11	3	—	—
3	—	1899	4–5 April	Milan, Italy	5	3	—	—
4	—	1903	1–3 October	Paris, France	18	5	—	—
5	—	1904	18 April	Vienna, Austria	13	4	—	—
6	—	1905	8–10 April	Berlin, Germany	41	4	—	—
7	—	1905	11–13 June	Duisburg, Germany	7	2	—	—
8	—	1905	16 & 30 December	Paris, France	16	1	—	—
9	—	1906	18 March	Lille, France	33	4	—	—
10	—	1907	19 May	Frankfurt, Germany	23	3	—	—
11	—	1908	8–9 December	Vienna, Austria	23	2	—	—
12	—	1909	3 October & 2 December	Vienna, Austria	23	3	—	—
13	—	1910	4–6 June	Düsseldorf, Germany	57	5	—	—
14	—	1910	9–10 October	Vienna, Austria	15	2	—	—
15	—	1911	29–30 April	Stuttgart, Germany	36	3	—	—
16	—	1911	13–14 May	Berlin, Germany	27	2	—	—
17	—	1911	26 June	Dresden, Germany	21	3	—	—
18	—	1911	29 June – 2 July	Vienna, Austria	32	3	—	—
19	—	1913	28–29 July	Breslau, Germany	40	4	—	—
Wild World Championship (1891-1913)
1914–1919: Not held due to World War I
Irregular due to weak organization, limited financial resources and a focus on European Weightlifting Championships (1920-1938)
20	—	1920	4–8 September	Vienna, Austria	74	4	—	—
21	—	1922	29–30 April	Tallinn, Estonia	33	4	—	—
22	—	1923	8–9 September	Vienna, Austria	76	7	—	—
23	—	1937	10–12 September	Paris, France	50	10	—	—
24	—	1938	21–23 October	Vienna, Germany	38	11	—	—
Irregular due to weak organization, limited financial resources and a focus on European Weightlifting Championships (1920-1938)
1939–1945: Not held due to World War II
25	—	1946	18–19 October	Paris, France	79	13	—	—
26	—	1947	26–27 September	Philadelphia, United States	39	12	—	—
Since 1949 team classification was added.
27	—	1949	4–6 September	Scheveningen, Netherlands	38	13	—	—
28	—	1950	13–15 October	Paris, France	56	17	—	—
29	—	1951	26–28 October	Milan, Italy	62	14	—	—
30	—	1953	26–30 August	Stockholm, Sweden	70	19	—	—
31	—	1954	7–10 October	Vienna, Austria	100	23	—	—
32	—	1955	12–16 October	Munich, West Germany	108	25	—	—
33	—	1957	8–12 November	Tehran, Iran	76	21	—	—
34	—	1958	16–21 September	Stockholm, Sweden	96	27	—	—
35	—	1959	29 September – 4 October	Warsaw, Poland	85	19	—	—
36	—	1961	20–25 September	Vienna, Austria	120	33	—	—
37	—	1962	16–22 September	Budapest, Hungary	113	27	—	—
38	—	1963	16–22 September	Stockholm, Sweden	134	32	—	—
39	—	1964	11–18 October	Tokyo, Japan	149	42	—	—
40	—	1965	27 October – 3 November	Tehran, Iran	85	24	—	—
41	—	1966	15–21 October	East Berlin, East Germany	117	28	—	—
42	—	1968	13–19 October	Mexico City, Mexico	160	55	—	—
Since 1969 medals were awarded for individual lifts in addition to the total.
43	—	1969	20–28 September	Warsaw, Poland	166	37	—	—
44	—	1970	12–20 September	Columbus, United States	129	28	—	—
45	—	1971	18–26 September	Lima, Peru	144	30	—	—
46	—	1972	27 August – 6 September	Munich, West Germany	188	54	—	—
Since 1973 press was eliminated.
47	—	1973	15–23 September	Havana, Cuba	189	39	—	—
48	—	1974	21–29 September	Manila, Philippines	143	32	—	—
49	—	1975	15–23 September	Moscow, Soviet Union	169	33	—	—
50	—	1976	18–27 July	Montreal, Canada	173	46	—	—
51	—	1977	17–25 September	Stuttgart, West Germany	186	44	—	—
52	—	1978	4–8 October	Gettysburg, United States	185	35	—	—
53	—	1979	3–11 November	Thessaloniki, Greece	189	39	—	—
54	—	1980	20–30 July	Moscow, Soviet Union	173	40	—	—
55	—	1981	13–20 September	Lille, France	194	35	—	—
56	—	1982	18–26 September	(Socialist Federal Republic of Yugoslavia) Ljubljana, Yugoslavia	205	38	—	—
57	—	1983	22–31 October	Moscow, Soviet Union	187	32	—	—
58	—	1984	29 July – 8 August	Los Angeles, United States	187	48	—	—
59	—	1985	23 August – 1 September	Södertälje, Sweden	195	38	—	—
60	—	1986	8–15 November	Sofia, Bulgaria	193	41	—	—
Men / Women
61	—	1987	6–13 September	Ostrava, Czechoslovakia	168	29	—	—
—	1	1987	30 October – 1 November	Daytona Beach, United States	—	—	100	22
—	2	1988	2–4 December	Jakarta, Indonesia	—	—	103	23
62	—	1989	16–23 September	Piraeus, Greece	220	37	—	—
—	3	1989	24–26 November	Manchester, United Kingdom	—	—	133	25
—	4	1990	26 May – 3 June	(Socialist Federal Republic of Yugoslavia) Sarajevo, Yugoslavia	—	—	109	25
63	—	1990	10–18 November	Budapest, Hungary	182	38	—	—
Combined
64	5	1991	27 September – 6 October	Donaueschingen, Germany	200	40	108	24
—	6	1992	16–24 May	Varna, Bulgaria	—	—	110	25
65	7	1993	11–21 November	Melbourne, Australia	195	57	94	25
66	8	1994	17–27 November	Istanbul, Turkey	242	52	105	30
67	9	1995	16–26 November	Guangzhou, China	345	63	93	26
—	10	1996	3–11 May	Warsaw, Poland	—	—	102	24
68	11	1997	6–14 December	Chiang Mai, Thailand	189	51	143	39
69	12	1998	10–15 November	Lahti, Finland	210	53	122	35
70	13	1999	21–28 November	Piraeus, Greece	395	79	231	51
71	14	2001	4–11 November	Antalya, Turkey	153	47	114	34
72	15	2002	18–26 November	Warsaw, Poland	170	47	115	37
73	16	2003	14–22 November	Vancouver, Canada	297	59	208	47
74	17	2005	9–17 November	Doha, Qatar	169	58	112	42
75	18	2006	30 September – 7 October	Santo Domingo, Dominican Republic	298	58	186	39
76	19	2007	17–26 September	Chiang Mai, Thailand	355	70	225	53
77	20	2009	20–29 November	Goyang, South Korea	196	57	133	38
78	21	2010	17–26 September	Antalya, Turkey	312	63	203	50
79	22	2011	5–13 November	Paris, France	307	75	212	61
80	23	2013	20–27 October	Wrocław, Poland	168	49	124	37
81	24	2014	8–16 November	Almaty, Kazakhstan	307	62	219	51
82	25	2015	20–28 November	Houston, United States	324	76	261	72
83	26	2017	28 November – 5 December	Anaheim, United States	176	54	139	44
84	27	2018	1–10 November	Ashgabat, Turkmenistan	272	68	310	73
85	28	2019	18–27 September	Pattaya, Thailand	313	84	275	79
86	29	2021	7–17 December	Tashkent, Uzbekistan	235	64	179	54
87	30	2022	5–16 December	Bogotá, Colombia	267	79	270	76
88	31	2023	4–17 September	Riyadh, Saudi Arabia	365	105	354	94
Since 2024 it has also been held in Olympic years
89	32	2024	4–14 December	Manama, Bahrain	245	76	226	75
90	33	2025	1–10 October	Førde, Norway	206	70	206	61
91	34	2026	27 October – 8 November	Ningbo, China	261	85	267	80
92	35	2027		Yerevan, Armenia				
93	36	2028		Caracas, Venezuela				
94	37	2029		Ahmedabad, India				
95	38	2030		Moscow, Russia				

== All-time medal table ==
=== Total ===
All-time big (total) medal count below updated after the 2025 World Weightlifting Championships.

Rank	Nation	Gold	Silver	Bronze	Total
1	China	202	97	50	349
2	Soviet Union	151	90	33	274
3	Bulgaria	82	82	65	229
4	United States	44	54	35	133
5	Russia	39	48	34	121
6	Austria	32	27	31	90
7	North Korea	27	30	27	84
8	Poland	25	38	57	120
9	Iran	25	18	31	74
10	Germany	24	34	27	85
11	Chinese Taipei	18	23	26	67
12	Kazakhstan	17	9	9	35
13	Turkey	16	19	18	53
14	South Korea	14	22	28	64
15	Egypt	14	15	15	44
16	Thailand	12	20	22	54
17	Hungary	11	38	42	91
18	Colombia	10	18	19	47
19	Greece	10	15	11	36
20	Japan	10	14	28	52
21	Georgia	9	5	5	19
22	Belarus	8	8	8	24
23	Ukraine	8	7	19	34
24	Cuba	8	6	11	25
25	Romania	7	14	14	35
26	France	7	11	20	38
27	Armenia	7	10	14	31
28	Uzbekistan	7	5	6	18
29	Indonesia	6	12	10	28
30	Great Britain	5	5	10	20
31	Qatar	5	4	4	13
32	East Germany	4	19	29	52
33	Switzerland	4	4	2	10
34	Finland	4	2	10	16
35	India	3	10	5	18
36	West Germany	3	5	3	11
37	Estonia	3	4	6	13
38	Czechoslovakia	3	3	15	21
39	Norway	3	3	1	7
40	Azerbaijan	3	2	4	9
41	Italy	2	6	9	17
42	Vietnam	2	5	7	14
43	Turkmenistan	2	3	0	5
44	Spain	2	2	4	8
45	Australia	1	5	6	12
46	Latvia	1	3	7	11
47	Canada	1	3	5	9
48	Bahrain	1	2	2	5
49	Sweden	1	1	7	9
50	Chile	1	1	0	2
51	Philippines	1	0	5	6
51	Venezuela	1	0	5	6
53	Slovakia	1	0	1	2
53	Tunisia	1	0	1	2
55	Mongolia	1	0	0	1
56	Nigeria	0	4	4	8
57	Belgium	0	4	3	7
58	Ecuador	0	3	9	12
59	Denmark	0	3	0	3
60	Netherlands	0	2	0	2
61	Dominican Republic	0	1	5	6
61	Moldova	0	1	5	6
63	Argentina	0	1	1	2
63	Brazil	0	1	1	2
65	Albania	0	1	0	1
65	Croatia	0	1	0	1
65	Guyana	0	1	0	1
65	Lebanon	0	1	0	1
65	Lithuania	0	1	0	1
65	Madagascar	0	1	0	1
65	Malaysia	0	1	0	1
65	New Zealand	0	1	0	1
73	Myanmar	0	0	5	5
74	Russian Weightlifting Federation (Note: At the 2021 World Championships, in accordance with a ban by the World Anti-Doping Agency (WADA) and a decision by the Court of Arbitration for Sport (CAS), weightlifters from Russia were not permitted to use the Russian name, flag, or anthem. They instead participated under the name and the modified flag of the Russian Weightlifting Federation (RWF).)	0	0	3	3
75	Iraq	0	0	2	2
75	Mexico	0	0	2	2
75	Saudi Arabia	0	0	2	2
78	Macau	0	0	1	1
–	Individual Neutral Athletes (Note: At the 2023 World Championships, in accordance with sanctions imposed following by the 2022 Russian invasion of Ukraine, weightlifters from Belarus were not permitted to use the name, flag, or anthem of Belarus. They instead participated as "Individual Neutral Athletes (AIN)", their medals were not included in the official medal table.)	0	0	1	1
Totals (78 entries)		909	909	907	2,725

=== Big and small medals ===
All-time big (total) and small (snatch, clean & jerk, and press) medal count below updated after the 2025 World Weightlifting Championships.

Rank	Nation	Gold	Silver	Bronze	Total
1	China	605	286	165	1,056
2	Soviet Union	331	208	93	632
3	Bulgaria	231	225	189	645
4	Russia	119	133	91	343
5	North Korea	92	84	65	241
6	United States	65	94	85	244
7	Poland	64	99	124	287
8	Iran	57	50	59	166
9	Turkey	51	57	52	160
10	Chinese Taipei	47	73	79	199
11	Hungary	39	89	107	235
12	South Korea	38	73	88	199
13	Thailand	38	54	54	146
14	Kazakhstan	37	34	29	100
15	Germany	36	43	37	116
16	Austria	32	27	34	93
17	Georgia	31	12	11	54
18	Colombia	27	49	65	141
19	Greece	26	43	41	110
20	Cuba	26	25	36	87
21	Egypt	26	25	29	80
22	Uzbekistan	26	18	19	63
23	Romania	25	32	44	101
24	Belarus	25	26	33	84
25	Japan	24	52	75	151
26	Armenia	22	36	44	102
27	Ukraine	22	29	48	99
28	East Germany	20	61	71	152
29	Indonesia	18	26	34	78
30	West Germany	13	14	15	42
31	France	12	21	34	67
32	Qatar	12	12	11	35
33	Finland	12	11	22	45
34	Norway	12	6	5	23
35	Vietnam	9	17	18	44
36	India	8	30	16	54
37	Azerbaijan	8	7	10	25
38	Spain	6	6	19	31
39	Czechoslovakia	5	14	40	59
40	Great Britain	5	13	23	41
41	Australia	5	10	20	35
42	Turkmenistan	5	9	6	20
43	Switzerland	5	5	3	13
44	Chile	5	2	1	8
45	Italy	4	13	18	35
46	Estonia	4	5	6	15
47	Philippines	4	1	12	17
48	Russian Weightlifting Federation	4	0	7	11
49	Belgium	3	8	4	15
50	Sweden	3	4	12	19
51	Myanmar	3	2	8	13
52	Venezuela	3	1	16	20
53	Slovakia	3	1	4	8
54	Bahrain	2	9	4	15
55	Latvia	2	5	16	23
56	Moldova	2	5	11	18
57	Albania	2	3	3	8
58	Lithuania	2	2	1	5
59	Tunisia	2	1	4	7
60	Canada	1	12	10	23
61	Nigeria	1	10	15	26
62	Ecuador	1	8	27	36
63	Dominican Republic	1	6	9	16
64	Mongolia	1	4	2	7
65	Brazil	1	2	3	6
66	Saudi Arabia	1	0	4	5
67	Iraq	1	0	3	4
–	Individual Neutral Athletes	1	0	1	2
68	Croatia	0	4	0	4
69	Malaysia	0	3	1	4
70	Denmark	0	3	0	3
70	Madagascar	0	3	0	3
72	Mexico	0	2	7	9
73	Lebanon	0	2	2	4
74	Nauru	0	2	0	2
74	Netherlands	0	2	0	2
74	New Zealand	0	2	0	2
77	Argentina	0	1	1	2
77	Kyrgyzstan	0	1	1	2
77	Puerto Rico	0	1	1	2
80	Guyana	0	1	0	1
80	(Federated States of Micronesia) Micronesia	0	1	0	1
82	Macau	0	0	3	3
83	Syria	0	0	2	2
84	Algeria	0	0	1	1
84	CIS	0	0	1	1
84	Israel	0	0	1	1
84	Pakistan	0	0	1	1
84	Peru	0	0	1	1
84	United Arab Republic	0	0	1	1
Totals (89 entries)		2,374	2,370	2,368	7,112

- Names in italic are national entities that no longer exist.

== Multiple medalists ==
The table shows those who have won at least 5 gold medals in total result. Boldface denotes active weightlifters and highest medal count among all weightlifters (including these who not included in these tables) per type.

Rank	Weightlifter	Country	Gender	Weights	From	To	Gold	Silver	Bronze	Total
1	Vasily Alekseyev	Soviet Union	M	+110 kg	1970	1977	**8**	–	–	8
2	Naim (Naum) Süleymanoğlu (Suleymanov, Shalamanov)	Bulgaria; Turkey	M	56 kg / 60 kg / 64 kg	1983	1995	7	1	–	8
2	Yurik Vardanyan	Soviet Union	M	75 kg / 82.5 kg / 90 kg	1977	1985	7	1	–	8
4	**Lasha Talakhadze**	Georgia	M	+105 kg / +109 kg	2015	2023	7	–	–	7
5	Josef Grafl	Austria	M	Open / +80 kg	1904	1913	6	2	–	8
6	Tommy Kono	United States	M	75 kg / 82.5 kg	1953	1962	6	1	1	8
7	John Davis	United States	M	82.5 kg / +82.5 kg / +90 kg	1938	1953	6	1	–	7
8	Yoshinobu Miyake	Japan	M	56 kg / 60 kg	1961	1968	6	–	1	7
8	David Rigert	Soviet Union	M	82.5 kg / 90 kg / 100 kg	1970	1978	6	–	1	7
10	Waldemar Baszanowski	Poland	M	67.5 kg / 75 kg	1961	1971	5	5	–	10
11	Arkady Vorobyov	Soviet Union	M	82.5 kg / 90 kg	1950	1961	5	2	1	8
12	Pete George	United States	M	67.5 kg / 75 kg	1947	1955	5	2	–	7
12	Halil Mutlu	Turkey	M	54 kg / 56 kg / 62 kg	1993	2003	5	2	–	7
12	Yanko Rusev	Bulgaria	M	60 kg / 67.5 kg / 75 kg	1977	1983	5	2	–	7
15	Mohammad Nassiri	Iran	M	56 kg / 52 kg	1966	1976	5	1	3	9
16	**Kuo Hsing-chun**	Chinese Taipei	F	58 kg / 59 kg	2013	2025	5	1	2	8
17	**Chen Lijun**	China	M	62 kg / 67 kg	2013	2023	5	1	–	6
17	Viktor Kurentsov	Soviet Union	M	75 kg	1964	1970	5	1	–	6
17	**Lü Xiaojun**	China	M	77 kg / 81 kg	2009	2019	5	1	–	6
20	Anatoly Khrapaty	Soviet Union; Kazakhstan	M	90 kg / 91 kg / 99 kg	1985	1995	5	–	2	7
20	Stanley Stanczyk	United States	M	67.5 kg / 75 kg / 82.5 kg	1946	1954	5	–	2	7
22	Vladimir Stogov	Soviet Union	M	56 kg	1955	1962	5	–	1	6
23	Deng Wei	China	F	58 kg / 63 kg / 64 kg	2010	2019	5	–	–	5
23	**Om Yun-chol**	North Korea	M	56 kg / 55 kg	2013	2019	5	–	–	5

== See also ==
- Weightlifting at the Summer Olympics
- List of World Championships medalists in weightlifting (men)
- List of World Championships medalists in weightlifting (women)
- Youth World Weightlifting Championships
- Junior World Weightlifting Championships
