= St. Michel Arena =

Sports arena

Coordinates: 45.5654°N 73.6070°W

St. Michel Arena is a 2,000-seat indoor arena in Montreal, Quebec, Canada that was built in 1968. It served as the weightlifting venue of the 1976 Summer Olympics and is located about 4.4 km west of the Olympic Stadium. The capacity was temporarily raised to 2,700 for the games.
