= List of World Championships medalists in weightlifting (men) =

Weightlifting lists

This is a List of World Championships medalists in men's weightlifting.

== Flyweight ==
- 52 kg: 1969–1991
- 54 kg: 1993–1997
- 55 kg: 2018–2024

Games	Gold	Silver	Bronze
1969 Warsaw	Vladislav Krishchishin (URS)	Vladimir Smetanin (URS)	Walter Szołtysek (POL)
1970 Columbus	Sándor Holczreiter (HUN)	Walter Szołtysek (POL)	Vladimir Smetanin (URS)
1971 Lima	Zygmunt Smalcerz (POL)	Sándor Holczreiter (HUN)	Masahiro Ueki (JPN)
1972 Munich	Zygmunt Smalcerz (POL)	Lajos Szűcs (HUN)	Sándor Holczreiter (HUN)
1973 Havana	Mohammad Nassiri (IRI)	Lajos Szűcs (HUN)	Zygmunt Smalcerz (POL)
1974 Manila	Mohammad Nassiri (IRI)	György Kőszegi (HUN)	Takeshi Horikoshi (JPN)
1975 Moscow	Zygmunt Smalcerz (POL)	Aleksandr Voronin (URS)	Lajos Szűcs (HUN)
1976 Montreal	Aleksandr Voronin (URS)	György Kőszegi (HUN)	Mohammad Nassiri (IRI)
1977 Stuttgart	Aleksandr Voronin (URS)	György Kőszegi (HUN)	Francisco Casamayor (CUB)
1978 Gettysburg	Kanybek Osmonaliyev (URS)	Tadeusz Golik (POL)	Francisco Casamayor (CUB)
1979 Thessaloniki	Kanybek Osmonaliyev (URS)	Ferenc Hornyák (HUN)	Shared silver
1979 Thessaloniki	Kanybek Osmonaliyev (URS)	Aleksandr Voronin (URS)	Shared silver
1980 Moscow	Kanybek Osmonaliyev (URS)	Ho Bong-chol (PRK)	Han Gyong-si (PRK)
1981 Lille	Kanybek Osmonaliyev (URS)	Jacek Gutowski (POL)	Kazushito Manabe (JPN)
1982 Ljubljana	Stefan Leletko (POL)	Zhenya Sarandaliev (BUL)	Jacek Gutowski (POL)
1983 Moscow	Neno Terziyski (BUL)	Jacek Gutowski (POL)	Stefan Leletko (POL)
1984 Los Angeles	Zeng Guoqiang (CHN)	Zhou Peishun (CHN)	Kazushito Manabe (JPN)
1985 Södertälje	Sevdalin Marinov (BUL)	Zeng Guoqiang (CHN)	Bernard Piekorz (POL)
1986 Sofia	Sevdalin Marinov (BUL)	Jacek Gutowski (POL)	Aleksey Kolokoltsev (URS)
1987 Ostrava	Sevdalin Marinov (BUL)	He Zhuoqiang (CHN)	Jacek Gutowski (POL)
1989 Athens	Ivan Ivanov (BUL)	He Zhuoqiang (CHN)	Traian Cihărean (ROU)
1990 Budapest	Ivan Ivanov (BUL)	Huang Xiliang (CHN)	Zhang Zairong (CHN)
1991 Donaueschingen	Ivan Ivanov (BUL)	Sevdalin Minchev (BUL)	Zhang Zairong (CHN)
1993 Melbourne	Ivan Ivanov (BUL)	Halil Mutlu (TUR)	Ko Kwang-ku (KOR)
1994 Istanbul	Halil Mutlu (TUR)	Ivan Ivanov (BUL)	Sevdalin Minchev (BUL)
1995 Guangzhou	Zhang Xiangsen (CHN)	Halil Mutlu (TUR)	Lan Shizhang (CHN)
1997 Chiang Mai	Lan Shizhang (CHN)	Yang Bin (CHN)	Wang Shin-yuan (TPE)
2018 Ashgabat	Om Yun-chol (PRK)	Arli Chontey (KAZ)	Mirco Scarantino (ITA)
2019 Pattaya	Om Yun-chol (PRK)	Igor Son (KAZ)	Mansour Al-Saleem (KSA)
2021 Tashkent	Arli Chontey (KAZ)	Thada Somboon-uan (THA)	Angel Rusev (BUL)
2022 Bogotá	Theerapong Silachai (THA)	Ngô Sơn Đỉnh (VIE)	Kim Yong-ho (KOR)
2023 Riyadh	Lại Gia Thành (VIE)	Ngô Sơn Đỉnh (VIE)	Natthawat Chomchuen (THA)
2024 Manama	Natthawat Chomchuen (THA)	Thiago Silva (BRA)	Fernando Agad (PHI)

== Bantamweight ==
- 56 kg: 1947–1991
- 59 kg: 1993–1997
- 56 kg: 1998–2017
- 61 kg: 2018–2024
- 60 kg: 2025–

Games	Gold	Silver	Bronze
1947 Philadelphia	Joseph DePietro (USA)	Richard Tom (USA)	Rosaire Smith (CAN)
1949 Scheveningen	Mahmoud Namjoo (IRI)	Kamal Mahgoub (EGY)	Joseph DePietro (USA)
1950 Paris	Mahmoud Namjoo (IRI)	Rafael Chimishkyan (URS)	Kamal Mahgoub (EGY)
1951 Milan	Mahmoud Namjoo (IRI)	Ali Mirzaei (IRI)	Kamal Mahgoub (EGY)
1953 Stockholm	Ivan Udodov (URS)	Kamal Mahgoub (EGY)	Karel Saitl (TCH)
1954 Vienna	Bakir Farkhutdinov (URS)	Mahmoud Namjoo (IRI)	Ali Mirzaei (IRI)
1955 Munich	Vladimir Stogov (URS)	Charles Vinci (USA)	Mahmoud Namjoo (IRI)
1957 Tehran	Vladimir Stogov (URS)	Ali Safa-Sonboli (IRI)	Mahmoud Namjoo (IRI)
1958 Stockholm	Vladimir Stogov (URS)	Charles Vinci (USA)	Ali Safa-Sonboli (IRI)
1959 Warsaw	Vladimir Stogov (URS)	Marian Jankowski (POL)	Imre Földi (HUN)
1961 Vienna	Vladimir Stogov (URS)	Imre Földi (HUN)	Yoshinobu Miyake (JPN)
1962 Budapest	Yoshinobu Miyake (JPN)	Imre Földi (HUN)	Vladimir Stogov (URS)
1963 Stockholm	Aleksey Vakhonin (URS)	Hiroshi Fukuda (JPN)	Shiro Ichinoseki (JPN)
1964 Tokyo	Aleksey Vakhonin (URS)	Imre Földi (HUN)	Shiro Ichinoseki (JPN)
1965 Tehran	Imre Földi (HUN)	Shiro Ichinoseki (JPN)	Yoshiyuki Miyake (JPN)
1966 East Berlin	Aleksey Vakhonin (URS)	Imre Földi (HUN)	Mohammad Nassiri (IRI)
1968 Mexico City	Mohammad Nassiri (IRI)	Imre Földi (HUN)	Henryk Trębicki (POL)
1969 Warsaw	Mohammad Nassiri (IRI)	Atanas Kirov (BUL)	Hiroshi Ono (JPN)
1970 Columbus	Mohammad Nassiri (IRI)	Imre Földi (HUN)	Henryk Trębicki (POL)
1971 Lima	Gennady Chetin (URS)	Henryk Trębicki (POL)	Mohammad Nassiri (IRI)
1972 Munich	Imre Földi (HUN)	Mohammad Nassiri (IRI)	Gennady Chetin (URS)
1973 Havana	Atanas Kirov (BUL)	Georgi Todorov (BUL)	Koji Miki (JPN)
1974 Manila	Atanas Kirov (BUL)	Leszek Skorupa (POL)	Jiro Hosotani (JPN)
1975 Moscow	Atanas Kirov (BUL)	Waldemar Korcz (POL)	Karel Prohl (TCH)
1976 Montreal	Norair Nurikyan (BUL)	Grzegorz Cziura (POL)	Kenkichi Ando (JPN)
1977 Stuttgart	Jiro Hosotani (JPN)	Georgi Todorov (BUL)	Chen Manlin (CHN)
1978 Gettysburg	Daniel Núñez (CUB)	Marek Seweryn (POL)	Kenkichi Ando (JPN)
1979 Thessaloniki	Anton Kodzhabashev (BUL)	Viktor Veretennikov (URS)	Tadeusz Dembończyk (POL)
1980 Moscow	Daniel Núñez (CUB)	Yurik Sarkisyan (URS)	Tadeusz Dembończyk (POL)
1981 Lille	Anton Kodzhabashev (BUL)	Andreas Letz (GDR)	Nikolay Zakharov (URS)
1982 Ljubljana	Anton Kodzhabashev (BUL)	Oksen Mirzoyan (URS)	Wu Shude (CHN)
1983 Moscow	Oksen Mirzoyan (URS)	Naim Suleymanov (BUL)	Andreas Letz (GDR)
1984 Los Angeles	Wu Shude (CHN)	Lai Runming (CHN)	Masahiro Kotaka (JPN)
1985 Södertälje	Neno Terziyski (BUL)	Oksen Mirzoyan (URS)	He Yingqiang (CHN)
1986 Sofia	Mitko Grablev (BUL)	He Yingqiang (CHN)	Oksen Mirzoyan (URS)
1987 Ostrava	Neno Terziyski (BUL)	Liu Shoubin (CHN)	Ri Jae-son (PRK)
1989 Athens	Hafiz Suleymanov (URS)	Liu Shoubin (CHN)	He Yingqiang (CHN)
1990 Budapest	Liu Shoubin (CHN)	He Yingqiang (CHN)	Chun Byung-kwan (KOR)
1991 Donaueschingen	Chun Byung-kwan (KOR)	Liu Shoubin (CHN)	Luo Jianming (CHN)
1993 Melbourne	Nikolay Peshalov (BUL)	Hafız Süleymanoğlu (TUR)	Tang Lingsheng (CHN)
1994 Istanbul	Nikolay Peshalov (BUL)	Hafız Süleymanoğlu (TUR)	Radostin Panayotov (BUL)
1995 Guangzhou	Leonidas Sabanis (GRE)	Chun Byung-kwan (KOR)	Nikolay Peshalov (BUL)
1997 Chiang Mai	Stefan Georgiev (BUL)	Le Maosheng (CHN)	Sevdalin Minchev (BUL)
1998 Lahti	Halil Mutlu (TUR)	Lan Shizhang (CHN)	Ivan Ivanov (BUL)
1999 Athens	Halil Mutlu (TUR)	Adrian Jigău (ROU)	Wang Shin-yuan (TPE)
2001 Antalya	Halil Mutlu (TUR)	Wang Shin-yuan (TPE)	William Vargas (CUB)
2002 Warsaw	Wu Meijin (CHN)	Yang Chin-yi (TPE)	Adrian Jigău (ROU)
2003 Vancouver	Wu Meijin (CHN)	Adrian Jigău (ROU)	Sedat Artuç (TUR)
2005 Doha	Wang Shin-yuan (TPE)	Lee Jong-hoon (KOR)	Hoàng Anh Tuấn (VIE)
2006 Santo Domingo	Li Zheng (CHN)	Sergio Álvarez (CUB)	Hoàng Anh Tuấn (VIE)
2007 Chiang Mai	Cha Kum-chol (PRK)	Li Zheng (CHN)	Eko Yuli Irawan (INA)
2009 Goyang	Long Qingquan (CHN)	Wu Jingbiao (CHN)	Sergio Álvarez (CUB)
2010 Antalya	Wu Jingbiao (CHN)	Long Qingquan (CHN)	Cha Kum-chol (PRK)
2011 Paris	Wu Jingbiao (CHN)	Zhao Chaojun (CHN)	Valentin Hristov (AZE)
2013 Wrocław	Om Yun-chol (PRK)	Long Qingquan (CHN)	Thạch Kim Tuấn (VIE)
2014 Almaty	Om Yun-chol (PRK)	Thạch Kim Tuấn (VIE)	Long Qingquan (CHN)
2015 Houston	Om Yun-chol (PRK)	Wu Jingbiao (CHN)	Thạch Kim Tuấn (VIE)
2017 Anaheim	Thạch Kim Tuấn (VIE)	Trần Lê Quốc Toàn (VIE)	Carlos Berna (COL)
2018 Ashgabat	Eko Yuli Irawan (INA)	Li Fabin (CHN)	Qin Fulin (CHN)
2019 Pattaya	Li Fabin (CHN)	Eko Yuli Irawan (INA)	Francisco Mosquera (COL)
2021 Tashkent	Shin Rok (KOR)	Shota Mishvelidze (GEO)	Seraj Al-Saleem (KSA)
2022 Bogotá	Li Fabin (CHN)	Eko Yuli Irawan (INA)	He Yueji (CHN)
2023 Riyadh	Li Fabin (CHN)	Sergio Massidda (ITA)	Ding Hongjie (CHN)
2024 Manama	Pak Myong-jin (PRK)	Aniq Kasdan (MAS)	Nguyễn Trần Anh Tuấn (VIE)
2025 Førde	Wang Hao (CHN)	Theerapong Silachai (THA)	Pang Un-chol (PRK)
2026 Ningbo	Yang Yang (CHN)	Pang Un-chol (PRK)	Pak In-song (PRK)

== Featherweight ==
- 60 kg: 1906–1991
- 64 kg: 1993–1997
- 62 kg: 1998–2017
- 67 kg: 2018–2024
- 65 kg: 2025–

Games	Gold	Silver	Bronze
1906 Lille	Daniel de Lapalud (SUI)	Joseph Staen (FRA)	Charles Cellier (FRA)
1910 Düsseldorf	Emil Kliment (AUT)	Alfred Anschütz (GER)	Franz Schmitz (GER)
1911 Stuttgart	Alfred Anschütz (GER)	Emil Kliment (AUT)	Georg Vogel (GER)
1911 Berlin	Emil Kliment (AUT)	Jakob Vogt (GER)	Oswald Greth (GER)
1911 Dresden	Rudolf Thamme (GER)	Oswald Greth (GER)	Georg Weißbeck (GER)
1911 Vienna	Emil Kliment (AUT)	Gustav Kubu (AUT)	Rudolf Meier (AUT)
1913 Breslau	Emil Kliment (AUT)	Piotr Cherudzinski (RUS)	Georg Vogel (GER)
1920 Vienna	Eugen Wiedmann (GER)	Andreas Jaquemont (GER)	Gustav Kubu (AUT)
1922 Tallinn	Heinrich Graf (SUI)	Karl Kõiv (EST)	Gustav Ernesaks (EST)
1923 Vienna	Andreas Stadler (AUT)	Wilhelm Rosinek (AUT)	Emil Kliment (AUT)
1937 Paris	Georg Liebsch (GER)	Anton Richter (AUT)	Max Walter (GER)
1938 Vienna	Georg Liebsch (GER)	Attilio Bescapè (ITA)	Anton Richter (AUT)
1946 Paris	Arvid Andersson (SWE)	Mahmoud Fayad (EGY)	Moisey Kasyanik (URS)
1947 Philadelphia	Robert Higgins (USA)	Nam Su-il (KOR)	Emerick Ishikawa (USA)
1949 Scheveningen	Mahmoud Fayad (EGY)	Johan Runge (DEN)	Max Heral (FRA)
1950 Paris	Mahmoud Fayad (EGY)	Yevgeny Lopatin (URS)	Julian Creus (GBR)
1951 Milan	Said Khalifa Gouda (EGY)	Johan Runge (DEN)	Julian Creus (GBR)
1953 Stockholm	Nikolay Saksonov (URS)	Rafael Chimishkyan (URS)	Einar Eriksson (SWE)
1954 Vienna	Rafael Chimishkyan (URS)	Ivan Udodov (URS)	Nil Tun Maung (BIR)
1955 Munich	Rafael Chimishkyan (URS)	Ivan Udodov (URS)	Kamal Mahgoub (EGY)
1957 Tehran	Yevgeny Minayev (URS)	Sebastiano Mannironi (ITA)	Isaac Berger (USA)
1958 Stockholm	Isaac Berger (USA)	Yevgeny Minayev (URS)	Sebastiano Mannironi (ITA)
1959 Warsaw	Marian Zieliński (POL)	Isaac Berger (USA)	Sebastiano Mannironi (ITA)
1961 Vienna	Isaac Berger (USA)	Sebastiano Mannironi (ITA)	Shared silver
1961 Vienna	Isaac Berger (USA)	Yevgeny Minayev (URS)	Shared silver
1962 Budapest	Yevgeny Minayev (URS)	Yevgeny Katsura (URS)	Rudolf Kozłowski (POL)
1963 Stockholm	Yoshinobu Miyake (JPN)	Isaac Berger (USA)	Imre Földi (HUN)
1964 Tokyo	Yoshinobu Miyake (JPN)	Isaac Berger (USA)	Mieczysław Nowak (POL)
1965 Tehran	Yoshinobu Miyake (JPN)	Mieczysław Nowak (POL)	Rudolf Kozłowski (POL)
1966 East Berlin	Yoshinobu Miyake (JPN)	Mieczysław Nowak (POL)	Yoshiyuki Miyake (JPN)
1968 Mexico City	Yoshinobu Miyake (JPN)	Dito Shanidze (URS)	Yoshiyuki Miyake (JPN)
1969 Warsaw	Yoshiyuki Miyake (JPN)	Mladen Kuchev (BUL)	Dito Shanidze (URS)
1970 Columbus	Mieczysław Nowak (POL)	Jan Wojnowski (POL)	Yoshiyuki Miyake (JPN)
1971 Lima	Yoshiyuki Miyake (JPN)	Kenkichi Ando (JPN)	Norair Nurikyan (BUL)
1972 Munich	Norair Nurikyan (BUL)	Dito Shanidze (URS)	János Benedek (HUN)
1973 Havana	Dito Shanidze (URS)	Norair Nurikyan (BUL)	Jan Wojnowski (POL)
1974 Manila	Georgi Todorov (BUL)	Nikolay Kolesnikov (URS)	Norair Nurikyan (BUL)
1975 Moscow	Georgi Todorov (BUL)	Nikolay Kolesnikov (URS)	Antoni Pawlak (POL)
1976 Montreal	Nikolay Kolesnikov (URS)	Georgi Todorov (BUL)	Kazumasa Hirai (JPN)
1977 Stuttgart	Nikolay Kolesnikov (URS)	Yanko Rusev (BUL)	Grzegorz Cziura (POL)
1978 Gettysburg	Nikolay Kolesnikov (URS)	Takashi Saito (JPN)	Valentin Todorov (BUL)
1979 Thessaloniki	Marek Seweryn (POL)	Georgi Todorov (BUL)	Setsuya Goto (JPN)
1980 Moscow	Viktor Mazin (URS)	Stefan Dimitrov (BUL)	Marek Seweryn (POL)
1981 Lille	Beloslav Manolov (BUL)	Daniel Núñez (CUB)	Yurik Sarkisyan (URS)
1982 Ljubljana	Yurik Sarkisyan (URS)	Andreas Behm (GDR)	Daniel Núñez (CUB)
1983 Moscow	Yurik Sarkisyan (URS)	Stefan Topurov (BUL)	Gelu Radu (ROU)
1984 Los Angeles	Chen Weiqiang (CHN)	Gelu Radu (ROU)	Tsai Wen-yee (TPE)
1985 Södertälje	Naum Shalamanov (BUL)	Yurik Sarkisyan (URS)	Andreas Letz (GDR)
1986 Sofia	Naum Shalamanov (BUL)	Attila Czanka (ROU)	Andreas Letz (GDR)
1987 Ostrava	Stefan Topurov (BUL)	Yurik Sarkisyan (URS)	Oksen Mirzoyan (URS)
1989 Athens	Naim Süleymanoğlu (TUR)	Nikolay Peshalov (BUL)	Attila Czanka (ROU)
1990 Budapest	Nikolay Peshalov (BUL)	Kim Yong-su (PRK)	Luo Jianming (CHN)
1991 Donaueschingen	Naim Süleymanoğlu (TUR)	Yurik Sarkisyan (URS)	He Yingqiang (CHN)
1993 Melbourne	Naim Süleymanoğlu (TUR)	Ri Hi-bong (PRK)	Yurik Sarkisyan (ARM)
1994 Istanbul	Naim Süleymanoğlu (TUR)	Valerios Leonidis (GRE)	Attila Czanka (HUN)
1995 Guangzhou	Naim Süleymanoğlu (TUR)	Valerios Leonidis (GRE)	Peng Song (CHN)
1997 Chiang Mai	Xiao Jiangang (CHN)	Hafız Süleymanoğlu (TUR)	Asif Malikov (AZE)
1998 Lahti	Leonidas Sabanis (GRE)	Nikolaj Pešalov (CRO)	Sevdalin Minchev (BUL)
1999 Athens	Le Maosheng (CHN)	Leonidas Sabanis (GRE)	Sevdalin Minchev (BUL)
2001 Antalya	Henadzi Aliashchuk (BLR)	Li Yinglong (CHN)	Stefan Georgiev (BUL)
2002 Warsaw	Im Yong-su (PRK)	Le Maosheng (CHN)	Stefan Georgiev (BUL)
2003 Vancouver	Halil Mutlu (TUR)	Shi Zhiyong (CHN)	Le Maosheng (CHN)
2005 Doha	Qiu Le (CHN)	Zhang Ping (CHN)	Adrian Jigău (ROU)
2006 Santo Domingo	Qiu Le (CHN)	Óscar Figueroa (COL)	Diego Salazar (COL)
2007 Chiang Mai	Yang Fan (CHN)	Im Yong-su (PRK)	Ivaylo Filev (BUL)
2009 Goyang	Ding Jianjun (CHN)	Eko Yuli Irawan (INA)	Yang Fan (CHN)
2010 Antalya	Kim Un-guk (PRK)	Zhang Jie (CHN)	Erol Bilgin (TUR)
2011 Paris	Zhang Jie (CHN)	Kim Un-guk (PRK)	Eko Yuli Irawan (INA)
2013 Wrocław	Chen Lijun (CHN)	Kim Un-guk (PRK)	Óscar Figueroa (COL)
2014 Almaty	Kim Un-guk (PRK)	Eko Yuli Irawan (INA)	Ding Jianjun (CHN)
2015 Houston	Chen Lijun (CHN)	Francisco Mosquera (COL)	Óscar Figueroa (COL)
2017 Anaheim	Francisco Mosquera (COL)	Yoichi Itokazu (JPN)	Shota Mishvelidze (GEO)
2018 Ashgabat	Chen Lijun (CHN)	Huang Minhao (CHN)	Julio Mayora (VEN)
2019 Pattaya	Chen Lijun (CHN)	Feng Lüdong (CHN)	Pak Jong-ju (PRK)
2021 Tashkent	Doston Yokubov (UZB)	Francisco Mosquera (COL)	Zulfat Garaev (RWF)
2022 Bogotá	Francisco Mosquera (COL)	Chen Lijun (CHN)	Weeraphon Wichuma (THA)
2023 Riyadh	Chen Lijun (CHN)	Eko Yuli Irawan (INA)	Gor Sahakyan (ARM)
2024 Manama	Ri Won-ju (PRK)	Pak Pyol (PRK)	Yusuf Fehmi Genç (TUR)
2025 Førde	Muhammed Furkan Özbek (TUR)	Pak Myong-jin (PRK)	Hampton Morris (USA)
2026 Ningbo	Pak Myong-jin (PRK)	Muhammed Furkan Özbek (TUR)	Hampton Morris (USA)

== Lightweight ==
- 67.5 kg: 1905
- 70 kg: 1906–1913
- 67.5 kg: 1920–1991
- 70 kg: 1993–1997
- 69 kg: 1998–2017
- 73 kg: 2018–2024
- 71 kg: 2025
- 70 kg: 2026–

Games	Gold	Silver	Bronze
1905 Berlin	Nikolaus Winkler (GER)	Albert Hansen (GER)	Paul Grimm (GER)
1905 Paris	Pierre Buisson (FRA)	Charles Liébault (FRA)	Marcel Bouteiller (FRA)
1905 Paris	Pierre Buisson (FRA)	Charles Liébault (FRA)	Robert Fredon (FRA)
1906 Lille	Georges Lorthiois (FRA)	Pierre Slosse (FRA)	Arthur Fessler (SUI)
1907 Frankfurt	Johannes Zebrowsky (GER)	Virgile Guerraz (SUI)	Heinrich Glenzer (GER)
1910 Düsseldorf	Eugen Ruhland (GER)	Karl Swoboda (AUT)	Josef Schwabl (AUT)
1911 Stuttgart	Ulrich Blaser (SUI)	Franz Komarek (AUT)	Peter Reinmuth (GER)
1911 Berlin	Josef Schwabl (AUT)	Albert Meyer (GER)	Paul Gnauk (GER)
1911 Dresden	Albert Meyer (GER)	Nikolaus Winkler (GER)	Max Kempe (GER)
1911 Vienna	Franz Komarek (AUT)	Josef Schwabl (AUT)	Leopold Butzek (AUT)
1913 Breslau	Wilhelm Köhler (GER)	Karl Samfaß (GER)	Karl Swoboda (AUT)
1920 Vienna	Philipp List (GER)	Josef Zimmermann (GER)	Karl Palkowitz (AUT)
1922 Tallinn	Alfred Neuland (EST)	Eduard Vanaaseme (EST)	Voldemar Noormägi (EST)
1923 Vienna	Rudolf Edinger (AUT)	Heinrich Baumann (GER)	Bohumil Durdis (TCH)
1937 Paris	Tony Terlazzo (USA)	Robert Fein (AUT)	Karl Jansen (GER)
1938 Vienna	Tony Terlazzo (USA)	Attia Hamouda (EGY)	Karl Schwitalle (GER)
1946 Paris	Stanley Stanczyk (USA)	Vladimir Svetilko (URS)	Georgi Popov (URS)
1947 Philadelphia	Pete George (USA)	John Stuart (CAN)	George Espeut (GBR)
1949 Scheveningen	Ibrahim Shams (EGY)	Joe Pitman (USA)	Arvid Andersson (SWE)
1950 Paris	Joe Pitman (USA)	Attia Hamouda (EGY)	Vladimir Svetilko (URS)
1951 Milan	Ibrahim Shams (EGY)	Joe Pitman (USA)	Hassan Ferdos (IRI)
1953 Stockholm	Pete George (USA)	Dmitry Ivanov (URS)	Said Khalifa Gouda (EGY)
1954 Vienna	Dmitry Ivanov (URS)	Said Khalifa Gouda (EGY)	Josef Tauchner (AUT)
1955 Munich	Nikolay Kostylev (URS)	Said Khalifa Gouda (EGY)	Nil Tun Maung (BIR)
1957 Tehran	Viktor Bushuev (URS)	Ivan Abadzhiev (BUL)	Jan Czepułkowski (POL)
1958 Stockholm	Viktor Bushuev (URS)	Luciano De Genova (ITA)	Henrik Tamraz (IRI)
1959 Warsaw	Viktor Bushuev (URS)	Akop Faradzhyan (URS)	Abdul-Wahid Aziz (IRQ)
1961 Vienna	Waldemar Baszanowski (POL)	Sergey Lopatin (URS)	Marian Zieliński (POL)
1962 Budapest	Vladimir Kaplunov (URS)	Waldemar Baszanowski (POL)	Marian Zieliński (POL)
1963 Stockholm	Marian Zieliński (POL)	Waldemar Baszanowski (POL)	Vladimir Kaplunov (URS)
1964 Tokyo	Waldemar Baszanowski (POL)	Vladimir Kaplunov (URS)	Marian Zieliński (POL)
1965 Tehran	Waldemar Baszanowski (POL)	Marian Zieliński (POL)	Vladimir Kaplunov (URS)
1966 East Berlin	Yevgeny Katsura (URS)	Marian Zieliński (POL)	Parviz Jalayer (IRI)
1968 Mexico City	Waldemar Baszanowski (POL)	Parviz Jalayer (IRI)	Marian Zieliński (POL)
1969 Warsaw	Waldemar Baszanowski (POL)	János Bagócs (HUN)	Zbigniew Kaczmarek (POL)
1970 Columbus	Zbigniew Kaczmarek (POL)	Waldemar Baszanowski (POL)	János Bagócs (HUN)
1971 Lima	Zbigniew Kaczmarek (POL)	Waldemar Baszanowski (POL)	Mukharby Kirzhinov (URS)
1972 Munich	Mukharby Kirzhinov (URS)	Mladen Kuchev (BUL)	Zbigniew Kaczmarek (POL)
1973 Havana	Mukharby Kirzhinov (URS)	Mladen Kuchev (BUL)	Petar Yanev (BUL)
1974 Manila	Petro Korol (URS)	Zbigniew Kaczmarek (POL)	Nasrollah Dehnavi (IRI)
1975 Moscow	Petro Korol (URS)	Zbigniew Kaczmarek (POL)	Mladen Kuchev (BUL)
1976 Montreal	Petro Korol (URS)	Daniel Senet (FRA)	Kazimierz Czarnecki (POL)
1977 Stuttgart	Roberto Urrutia (CUB)	Sergey Pevsner (URS)	Zbigniew Kaczmarek (POL)
1978 Gettysburg	Yanko Rusev (BUL)	Zbigniew Kaczmarek (POL)	Günter Ambraß (GDR)
1979 Thessaloniki	Yanko Rusev (BUL)	Joachim Kunz (GDR)	Daniel Senet (FRA)
1980 Moscow	Yanko Rusev (BUL)	Joachim Kunz (GDR)	Mincho Pashov (BUL)
1981 Lille	Joachim Kunz (GDR)	Mincho Pashov (BUL)	Daniel Senet (FRA)
1982 Ljubljana	Piotr Mandra (POL)	Virgil Dociu (ROU)	Zhao Xinmin (CHN)
1983 Moscow	Joachim Kunz (GDR)	Yanko Rusev (BUL)	Andreas Behm (GDR)
1984 Los Angeles	Yao Jingyuan (CHN)	Andrei Socaci (ROU)	Jouni Grönman (FIN)
1985 Södertälje	Mikhail Petrov (BUL)	Veselin Galabarov (BUL)	Yao Jingyuan (CHN)
1986 Sofia	Mikhail Petrov (BUL)	Stefan Topurov (BUL)	Marek Seweryn (POL)
1987 Ostrava	Mikhail Petrov (BUL)	Andreas Behm (GDR)	Israel Militosyan (URS)
1989 Athens	Israel Militosyan (URS)	Yoto Yotov (BUL)	Kim Myong-nam (PRK)
1990 Budapest	Kim Myong-nam (PRK)	Yoto Yotov (BUL)	Ri Hi-bong (PRK)
1991 Donaueschingen	Yoto Yotov (BUL)	Israel Militosyan (URS)	Kim Myong-nam (PRK)
1993 Melbourne	Yoto Yotov (BUL)	Ergün Batmaz (TUR)	Andreas Behm (GER)
1994 Istanbul	Fedail Güler (TUR)	Yoto Yotov (BUL)	Angel Genchev (BUL)
1995 Guangzhou	Zhan Xugang (CHN)	Fedail Güler (TUR)	Ergün Batmaz (TUR)
1997 Chiang Mai	Zlatan Vanev (BUL)	Zhan Xugang (CHN)	Wan Jianhui (CHN)
1998 Lahti	Plamen Zhelyazkov (BUL)	Georgios Tzelilis (GRE)	Wan Jianhui (CHN)
1999 Athens	Galabin Boevski (BUL)	Georgios Tzelilis (GRE)	Valerios Leonidis (GRE)
2001 Antalya	Galabin Boevski (BUL)	Georgios Tzelilis (GRE)	Reyhan Arabacıoğlu (TUR)
2002 Warsaw	Zhang Guozheng (CHN)	Chen Chufu (CHN)	Youssef Sbai (TUN)
2003 Vancouver	Zhang Guozheng (CHN)	Lee Bae-young (KOR)	Turan Mirzayev (AZE)
2005 Doha	Shi Zhiyong (CHN)	Lee Bae-young (KOR)	Vencelas Dabaya (FRA)
2006 Santo Domingo	Vencelas Dabaya (FRA)	Shi Zhiyong (CHN)	Demir Demirev (BUL)
2007 Chiang Mai	Zhang Guozheng (CHN)	Shi Zhiyong (CHN)	Demir Demirev (BUL)
2009 Goyang	Liao Hui (CHN)	Arakel Mirzoyan (ARM)	Triyatno (INA)
2010 Antalya	Mete Binay (TUR)	Armen Ghazaryan (RUS)	Triyatno (INA)
2011 Paris	Tang Deshang (CHN)	Oleg Chen (RUS)	Wu Chao (CHN)
2013 Wrocław	Liao Hui (CHN)	Oleg Chen (RUS)	Kim Myong-hyok (PRK)
2014 Almaty	Liao Hui (CHN)	Mohamed Ehab (EGY)	Kim Myong-hyok (PRK)
2015 Houston	Shi Zhiyong (CHN)	Oleg Chen (RUS)	Daniyar İsmayilov (TUR)
2017 Anaheim	Won Jeong-sik (KOR)	Tairat Bunsuk (THA)	Bernardin Matam (FRA)
2018 Ashgabat	Shi Zhiyong (CHN)	Won Jeong-sik (KOR)	Vadzim Likharad (BLR)
2019 Pattaya	Shi Zhiyong (CHN)	O Kang-chol (PRK)	Bozhidar Andreev (BUL)
2021 Tashkent	Rahmat Erwin Abdullah (INA)	Briken Calja (ALB)	Suttipong Jeeram (THA)
2022 Bogotá	Rahmat Erwin Abdullah (INA)	Rizki Juniansyah (INA)	Alexey Churkin (KAZ)
2023 Riyadh	Weeraphon Wichuma (THA)	Wei Yinting (CHN)	Muhammed Furkan Özbek (TUR)
2024 Manama	Ri Ryong-hyon (PRK)	Rizki Juniansyah (INA)	Zhong Zhiguang (CHN)
2025 Førde	Weeraphon Wichuma (THA)	Masanori Miyamoto (JPN)	He Yueji (CHN)
2026 Ningbo	Pak Pyol (PRK)	Ri Won-ju (PRK)	He Baozhen (CHN)

== Middleweight ==
- 80 kg: 1905–1913
- 75 kg: 1920–1991
- 76 kg: 1993–1997
- 77 kg: 1998–2017
- 81 kg: 2018–2024
- 79 kg: 2025
- 75 kg: 2026–

Games	Gold	Silver	Bronze
1905 Berlin	Otto Walther (GER)	Josef Lindinger (GER)	Edmund Danzer (AUT)
1905 Paris	André Dufour (FRA)	Miche Blayac (FRA)	Roger Morbu (FRA)
1906 Lille	Albert Deroubaix (FRA)	Louis Vasseur (FRA)	Gustave Lacroix (FRA)
1907 Frankfurt	Andreas Lutz (GER)	Johann Formberger (GER)	Hans Abraham (GER)
1908 Vienna	Johann Eibel (AUT)	Anton Nejedlik (AUT)	Johann Staudinger (AUT)
1909 Vienna	Johann Eibel (AUT)	Josef Hofböck (AUT)	Anton Lenz (AUT)
1910 Düsseldorf	Hans Abraham (GER)	Karl Ackermann (GER)	Rudolf Oswald (AUT)
1910 Vienna	Leopold Hennermüller (AUT)	Johann Eibel (AUT)	Leopold Bartasek (AUT)
1911 Stuttgart	Leopold Hennermüller (AUT)	Eugen Ruhland (GER)	Andreas Lutz (GER)
1911 Berlin	Rudolf Oswald (AUT)	Leopold Hennermüller (AUT)	Peter Haase (GER)
1911 Dresden	Hans Abraham (GER)	Beertye Berculon (NED)	August Stubner (AUT)
1911 Vienna	Leopold Hennermüller (AUT)	Ulrich Blaser (SUI)	August Stubner (AUT)
1913 Breslau	Leopold Hennermüller (AUT)	Hans Abraham (GER)	Josef Buchegger (AUT)
1920 Vienna	Karl Stritesky (AUT)	Ulrich Blaser (SUI)	Josef Kammerer (AUT)
1922 Tallinn	Saul Hallap (EST)	Alberts Ozoliņš (LAT)	Alfred Puusaag (EST)
1923 Vienna	Karl Freiberger (AUT)	Leopold Friedrich (AUT)	Alberts Ozoliņš (LAT)
1937 Paris	John Terpak (USA)	Adolf Wagner (GER)	Hans Valla (AUT)
1938 Vienna	Adolf Wagner (GER)	Rudolf Ismayr (GER)	John Terpak (USA)
1946 Paris	Khadr El-Touni (EGY)	John Terpak (USA)	Frank Spellman (USA)
1947 Philadelphia	Stanley Stanczyk (USA)	Frank Spellman (USA)	Kim Sung-jip (KOR)
1949 Scheveningen	Khadr El-Touni (EGY)	Pete George (USA)	Hassan Rahnavardi (IRI)
1950 Paris	Khadr El-Touni (EGY)	Pete George (USA)	Vladimir Pushkarev (URS)
1951 Milan	Pete George (USA)	Dave Sheppard (USA)	Khadr El-Touni (EGY)
1953 Stockholm	Tommy Kono (USA)	Dave Sheppard (USA)	Yury Duganov (URS)
1954 Vienna	Pete George (USA)	Fyodor Bogdanovsky (URS)	Stanley Stanczyk (USA)
1955 Munich	Pete George (USA)	Fyodor Bogdanovsky (URS)	Ingemar Franzén (SWE)
1957 Tehran	Tommy Kono (USA)	Fyodor Bogdanovsky (URS)	Jan Bochenek (POL)
1958 Stockholm	Tommy Kono (USA)	Fyodor Bogdanovsky (URS)	Marcel Paterni (FRA)
1959 Warsaw	Tommy Kono (USA)	Fyodor Bogdanovsky (URS)	Jan Bochenek (POL)
1961 Vienna	Aleksandr Kurynov (URS)	Győző Veres (HUN)	Marcel Paterni (FRA)
1962 Budapest	Aleksandr Kurynov (URS)	Mihály Huszka (HUN)	Mohammad Ami-Tehrani (IRI)
1963 Stockholm	Aleksandr Kurynov (URS)	Mihály Huszka (HUN)	Hans Zdražila (TCH)
1964 Tokyo	Hans Zdražila (TCH)	Viktor Kurentsov (URS)	Masushi Ouchi (JPN)
1965 Tehran	Viktor Kurentsov (URS)	Werner Dittrich (GDR)	Aleksandr Kurynov (URS)
1966 East Berlin	Viktor Kurentsov (URS)	Waldemar Baszanowski (POL)	Werner Dittrich (GDR)
1968 Mexico City	Viktor Kurentsov (URS)	Masushi Ouchi (JPN)	Károly Bakos (HUN)
1969 Warsaw	Viktor Kurentsov (URS)	Gábor Szarvas (HUN)	Juhani Mursu (FIN)
1970 Columbus	Viktor Kurentsov (URS)	Leif Jenssen (NOR)	Gábor Szarvas (HUN)
1971 Lima	Vladimir Kanygin (URS)	Leif Jenssen (NOR)	Anselmo Silvino (ITA)
1972 Munich	Yordan Bikov (BUL)	Mohamed Tarabulsi (LBN)	Anselmo Silvino (ITA)
1973 Havana	Nedelcho Kolev (BUL)	Peter Wenzel (GDR)	András Stark (HUN)
1974 Manila	Nedelcho Kolev (BUL)	Rumen Rusev (BUL)	Peter Wenzel (GDR)
1975 Moscow	Peter Wenzel (GDR)	Yordan Mitkov (BUL)	Nedelcho Kolev (BUL)
1976 Montreal	Yordan Mitkov (BUL)	Vardan Militosyan (URS)	Peter Wenzel (GDR)
1977 Stuttgart	Yurik Vardanyan (URS)	Peter Wenzel (GDR)	Günter Schliwka (GDR)
1978 Gettysburg	Roberto Urrutia (CUB)	Vardan Militosyan (URS)	Peter Wenzel (GDR)
1979 Thessaloniki	Roberto Urrutia (CUB)	Nedelcho Kolev (BUL)	Peter Wenzel (GDR)
1980 Moscow	Asen Zlatev (BUL)	Aleksandr Pervy (URS)	Nedelcho Kolev (BUL)
1981 Lille	Yanko Rusev (BUL)	Aleksandr Pervy (URS)	Julio Echenique (CUB)
1982 Ljubljana	Yanko Rusev (BUL)	Mincho Pashov (BUL)	Vladimir Mikhalev (URS)
1983 Moscow	Aleksandar Varbanov (BUL)	Vladimir Kuznetsov (URS)	Zdravko Stoichkov (BUL)
1984 Los Angeles	Karl-Heinz Radschinsky (FRG)	Jacques Demers (CAN)	Dragomir Cioroslan (ROU)
1985 Södertälje	Aleksandar Varbanov (BUL)	Mincho Pashov (BUL)	Andrei Socaci (ROU)
1986 Sofia	Aleksandar Varbanov (BUL)	Borislav Gidikov (BUL)	Andrei Socaci (ROU)
1987 Ostrava	Borislav Gidikov (BUL)	Aleksandar Varbanov (BUL)	Ingo Steinhöfel (GDR)
1989 Athens	Altimurat Orazdurdiev (URS)	Pablo Lara (CUB)	Jon Chol-ho (PRK)
1990 Budapest	Tudor Casapu (URS)	Andrei Socaci (ROU)	Yordan Yordanov (BUL)
1991 Donaueschingen	Pablo Lara (CUB)	Roman Sevasteyev (URS)	Tudor Casapu (URS)
1993 Melbourne	Altymyrat Orazdurdyýew (TKM)	Ruslan Savchenko (UKR)	Kim Myong-nam (PRK)
1994 Istanbul	Pablo Lara (CUB)	Ingo Steinhöfel (GER)	Ruslan Savchenko (UKR)
1995 Guangzhou	Pablo Lara (CUB)	Yoto Yotov (BUL)	Viktor Mitrou (GRE)
1997 Chiang Mai	Yoto Yotov (BUL)	Georgi Gardev (BUL)	Waldemar Kosiński (POL)
1998 Lahti	Zlatan Vanev (BUL)	Petar Tanev (BUL)	Mehmet Yılmaz (TUR)
1999 Athens	Badr Salem Nayef (QAT)	Viktor Mitrou (GRE)	Plamen Zhelyazkov (BUL)
2001 Antalya	Nader Sufyan Abbas (QAT)	Oleg Perepetchenov (RUS)	Mohammad Hossein Barkhah (IRI)
2002 Warsaw	Georgi Markov (BUL)	Oleg Perepetchenov (RUS)	Mohammad Hossein Barkhah (IRI)
2003 Vancouver	Mohammad Ali Falahatinejad (IRI)	Reyhan Arabacıoğlu (TUR)	Li Hongli (CHN)
2005 Doha	Li Hongli (CHN)	Sebastian Dogariu (ROU)	Nader Sufyan Abbas (QAT)
2006 Santo Domingo	Taner Sağır (TUR)	Li Hongli (CHN)	Ara Khachatryan (ARM)
2007 Chiang Mai	Ivan Stoitsov (BUL)	Gevorg Davtyan (ARM)	Li Hongli (CHN)
2009 Goyang	Lü Xiaojun (CHN)	Tigran Martirosyan (ARM)	Su Dajin (CHN)
2010 Antalya	Tigran Martirosyan (ARM)	Lü Xiaojun (CHN)	Tarek Yehia (EGY)
2011 Paris	Lü Xiaojun (CHN)	Su Dajin (CHN)	Sa Jae-hyouk (KOR)
2013 Wrocław	Lü Xiaojun (CHN)	Kim Kwang-song (PRK)	Ulugbek Alimov (UZB)
2014 Almaty	Zhong Guoshun (CHN)	Kim Kwang-song (PRK)	Kirill Pavlov (KAZ)
2015 Houston	Nijat Rahimov (KAZ)	Mohamed Ehab (EGY)	Andranik Karapetyan (ARM)
2017 Anaheim	Mohamed Ehab (EGY)	Rejepbaý Rejepow (TKM)	Harrison Maurus (USA)
2018 Ashgabat	Lü Xiaojun (CHN)	Mohamed Ehab (EGY)	Li Dayin (CHN)
2019 Pattaya	Lü Xiaojun (CHN)	Li Dayin (CHN)	Brayan Rodallegas (COL)
2021 Tashkent	Karlos Nasar (BUL)	Mirmostafa Javadi (IRI)	Marin Robu (MDA)
2022 Bogotá	Li Dayin (CHN)	Rejepbaý Rejepow (TKM)	Kim Woo-jae (KOR)
2023 Riyadh	Oscar Reyes (ITA)	Rahmat Erwin Abdullah (INA)	Mukhammadkodir Toshtemirov (UZB)
2024 Manama	Ri Chong-song (PRK)	Alexey Churkin (KAZ)	Mukhammadkodir Toshtemirov (UZB)
2025 Førde	Rizki Juniansyah (INA)	Ri Chong-song (PRK)	Abdelrahman Younes (EGY)
2026 Ningbo	Ri Ryong-hyon (PRK)	Rahmat Erwin Abdullah (INA)	Weeraphon Wichuma (THA)

== Light heavyweight ==
- 82.5 kg: 1920–1991
- 83 kg: 1993–1997
- 85 kg: 1998–2017
- 89 kg: 2018–2024
- 88 kg: 2025
- 85 kg: 2026–

Games	Gold	Silver	Bronze
1920 Vienna	Josef Straßberger (GER)	Franz Zuba (AUT)	Leopold Hennermüller (AUT)
1922 Tallinn	Roger François (FRA)	Johannes Toom (EST)	Rudolf Tihane (EST)
1923 Vienna	Jaroslav Skobla (TCH)	Sebastian Haberl (AUT)	August Böhnel (AUT)
1937 Paris	Fritz Haller (AUT)	Louis Hostin (FRA)	Anton Gietl (GER)
1938 Vienna	John Davis (USA)	Fritz Haller (AUT)	Louis Hostin (FRA)
1946 Paris	Grigory Novak (URS)	Frank Kay (USA)	Henri Ferrari (FRA)
1947 Philadelphia	John Terpak (USA)	Keevil Daly (GUY)	Juhani Vellamo (FIN)
1949 Scheveningen	Stanley Stanczyk (USA)	Jean Debuf (FRA)	Rasoul Raeisi (IRI)
1950 Paris	Stanley Stanczyk (USA)	Arkady Vorobyov (URS)	Arabi Awadi (EGY)
1951 Milan	Stanley Stanczyk (USA)	Jean Debuf (FRA)	Hassan Rahnavardi (IRI)
1953 Stockholm	Arkady Vorobyov (URS)	Trofim Lomakin (URS)	Stanley Stanczyk (USA)
1954 Vienna	Tommy Kono (USA)	Trofim Lomakin (URS)	Jean Debuf (FRA)
1955 Munich	Tommy Kono (USA)	Vasily Stepanov (URS)	Jim George (USA)
1957 Tehran	Trofim Lomakin (URS)	Jim George (USA)	Jalal Mansouri (IRI)
1958 Stockholm	Trofim Lomakin (URS)	Jim George (USA)	Ireneusz Paliński (POL)
1959 Warsaw	Rudolf Plyukfelder (URS)	Ireneusz Paliński (POL)	Jim George (USA)
1961 Vienna	Rudolf Plyukfelder (URS)	Géza Tóth (HUN)	Tommy Kono (USA)
1962 Budapest	Győző Veres (HUN)	Tommy Kono (USA)	Géza Tóth (HUN)
1963 Stockholm	Győző Veres (HUN)	Rudolf Plyukfelder (URS)	Géza Tóth (HUN)
1964 Tokyo	Rudolf Plyukfelder (URS)	Géza Tóth (HUN)	Győző Veres (HUN)
1965 Tehran	Norbert Ozimek (POL)	Aleksandr Kidyayev (URS)	Jerzy Kaczkowski (POL)
1966 East Berlin	Vladimir Belyaev (URS)	Győző Veres (HUN)	Hans Zdražila (TCH)
1968 Mexico City	Boris Selitsky (URS)	Vladimir Belyaev (URS)	Norbert Ozimek (POL)
1969 Warsaw	Masushi Ouchi (JPN)	Károly Bakos (HUN)	Boris Selitsky (URS)
1970 Columbus	Gennady Ivanchenko (URS)	Norbert Ozimek (POL)	David Rigert (URS)
1971 Lima	Boris Pavlov (URS)	Kaarlo Kangasniemi (FIN)	György Horváth (HUN)
1972 Munich	Leif Jenssen (NOR)	Norbert Ozimek (POL)	György Horváth (HUN)
1973 Havana	Vladimir Ryzhenkov (URS)	Frank Zielecke (GDR)	Stefan Sochanski (POL)
1974 Manila	Trendafil Stoychev (BUL)	Leif Jenssen (NOR)	Rolf Milser (FRG)
1975 Moscow	Valery Shary (URS)	Trendafil Stoychev (BUL)	Juhani Avellan (FIN)
1976 Montreal	Valery Shary (URS)	Trendafil Stoychev (BUL)	Péter Baczakó (HUN)
1977 Stuttgart	Gennady Bessonov (URS)	Péter Baczakó (HUN)	Paweł Rabczewski (POL)
1978 Gettysburg	Yurik Vardanyan (URS)	Péter Baczakó (HUN)	Paweł Rabczewski (POL)
1979 Thessaloniki	Yurik Vardanyan (URS)	Blagoy Blagoev (BUL)	Dušan Poliačik (TCH)
1980 Moscow	Yurik Vardanyan (URS)	Blagoy Blagoev (BUL)	Dušan Poliačik (TCH)
1981 Lille	Yurik Vardanyan (URS)	Asen Zlatev (BUL)	Dušan Poliačik (TCH)
1982 Ljubljana	Asen Zlatev (BUL)	Aleksandr Pervy (URS)	Bertalan Mandzák (HUN)
1983 Moscow	Yurik Vardanyan (URS)	Asen Zlatev (BUL)	László Barsi (HUN)
1984 Los Angeles	Petre Becheru (ROU)	Robert Kabbas (AUS)	Ryoji Isaoka (JPN)
1985 Södertälje	Yurik Vardanyan (URS)	Asen Zlatev (BUL)	László Király (HUN)
1986 Sofia	Asen Zlatev (BUL)	Israil Arsamakov (URS)	László Barsi (HUN)
1987 Ostrava	László Barsi (HUN)	Sergey Li (URS)	Asen Zlatev (BUL)
1989 Athens	Kiril Kounev (BUL)	Plamen Bratoychev (BUL)	Ingo Steinhöfel (GDR)
1990 Budapest	Altimurat Orazdurdiev (URS)	Sergey Li (URS)	Kiril Kounev (BUL)
1991 Donaueschingen	Ibragim Samadov (URS)	Aleksandr Blyshchyk (URS)	Plamen Bratoychev (BUL)
1993 Melbourne	Pyrros Dimas (GRE)	Marc Huster (GER)	Kiril Kounev (AUS)
1994 Istanbul	Marc Huster (GER)	Sergo Chakhoyan (ARM)	Sunay Bulut (TUR)
1995 Guangzhou	Pyrros Dimas (GRE)	Marc Huster (GER)	Vadim Vacarciuc (MDA)
1997 Chiang Mai	Andrzej Cofalik (POL)	Dursun Sevinç (TUR)	Krzysztof Siemion (POL)
1998 Lahti	Pyrros Dimas (GRE)	Marc Huster (GER)	Yury Myshkovets (RUS)
1999 Athens	Shahin Nassirinia (IRI)	Pyrros Dimas (GRE)	Marc Huster (GER)
2001 Antalya	Giorgi Asanidze (GEO)	Aliaksandr Anishchanka (BLR)	Milen Dobrev (BUL)
2002 Warsaw	Zlatan Vanev (BUL)	Giorgi Asanidze (GEO)	Ruslan Novikau (BLR)
2003 Vancouver	Valeriu Calancea (ROU)	Yuan Aijun (CHN)	Sergo Chakhoyan (AUS)
2005 Doha	Ilya Ilyin (KAZ)	Lu Yong (CHN)	Aslanbek Ediev (RUS)
2006 Santo Domingo	Andrei Rybakou (BLR)	Aslanbek Ediev (RUS)	Tigran Martirosyan (ARM)
2007 Chiang Mai	Andrei Rybakou (BLR)	Aslanbek Ediev (RUS)	Vadzim Straltsou (BLR)
2009 Goyang	Lu Yong (CHN)	Siarhei Lahun (BLR)	Vladimir Kuznetsov (KAZ)
2010 Antalya	Adrian Zieliński (POL)	Aleksey Yufkin (RUS)	Siarhei Lahun (BLR)
2011 Paris	Kianoush Rostami (IRI)	Benjamin Hennequin (FRA)	Adrian Zieliński (POL)
2013 Wrocław	Apti Aukhadov (RUS)	Ivan Markov (BUL)	Artem Okulov (RUS)
2014 Almaty	Kianoush Rostami (IRI)	Ivan Markov (BUL)	Artem Okulov (RUS)
2015 Houston	Artem Okulov (RUS)	Kianoush Rostami (IRI)	Apti Aukhadov (RUS)
2017 Anaheim	Arley Méndez (CHI)	Krzysztof Zwarycz (POL)	Antonino Pizzolato (ITA)
2018 Ashgabat	Artem Okulov (RUS)	Pavel Khadasevich (BLR)	Revaz Davitadze (GEO)
2019 Pattaya	Hakob Mkrtchyan (ARM)	Ali Miri (IRI)	Revaz Davitadze (GEO)
2021 Tashkent	Yu Dong-ju (KOR)	Sarvarbek Zafarjonov (UZB)	Revaz Davitadze (GEO)
2022 Bogotá	Keydomar Vallenilla (VEN)	Brayan Rodallegas (COL)	Liu Huanhua (CHN)
2023 Riyadh	Mirmostafa Javadi (IRI)	Li Dayin (CHN)	Keydomar Vallenilla (VEN)
2024 Manama	Karlos Nasar (BUL)	Ro Kwang-ryol (PRK)	Marin Robu (MDA)
2025 Førde	Yeison López (COL)	Ro Kwang-ryol (PRK)	Marin Robu (MDA)
2026 Ningbo	Abdelrahman Younes (EGY)	Yeison López (COL)	Lei Jiangqing (CHN)

== Middle heavyweight ==
- 90 kg: 1951–1991
- 91 kg: 1993–1997
- 94 kg: 1998–2017
- 96 kg: 2018–2024
- 94 kg: 2025
- 95 kg: 2026–

Games	Gold	Silver	Bronze
1951 Milan	Norbert Schemansky (USA)	Mohamed Ibrahim Saleh (EGY)	Firouz Pojhan (IRI)
1953 Stockholm	Norbert Schemansky (USA)	Mohamed Ibrahim Saleh (EGY)	Mohamed Ali Abdelkerim (EGY)
1954 Vienna	Arkady Vorobyov (URS)	Dave Sheppard (USA)	Clyde Emrich (USA)
1955 Munich	Arkady Vorobyov (URS)	Clyde Emrich (USA)	Hassan Rahnavardi (IRI)
1957 Tehran	Arkady Vorobyov (URS)	Hassan Rahnavardi (IRI)	Firouz Pojhan (IRI)
1958 Stockholm	Arkady Vorobyov (URS)	Dave Sheppard (USA)	Ivan Veselinov (BUL)
1959 Warsaw	Louis Martin (GBR)	Arkady Vorobyov (URS)	Czesław Białas (POL)
1961 Vienna	Ireneusz Paliński (POL)	Louis Martin (GBR)	Arkady Vorobyov (URS)
1962 Budapest	Louis Martin (GBR)	Ireneusz Paliński (POL)	William March (USA)
1963 Stockholm	Louis Martin (GBR)	Ireneusz Paliński (POL)	Eduard Brovko (URS)
1964 Tokyo	Vladimir Golovanov (URS)	Louis Martin (GBR)	Ireneusz Paliński (POL)
1965 Tehran	Louis Martin (GBR)	Vladimir Golovanov (URS)	Géza Tóth (HUN)
1966 East Berlin	Géza Tóth (HUN)	Ireneusz Paliński (POL)	Marek Gołąb (POL)
1968 Mexico City	Kaarlo Kangasniemi (FIN)	Jaan Talts (URS)	Marek Gołąb (POL)
1969 Warsaw	Kaarlo Kangasniemi (FIN)	Bo Johansson (SWE)	Géza Tóth (HUN)
1970 Columbus	Vasily Kolotov (URS)	Phil Grippaldi (USA)	Géza Tóth (HUN)
1971 Lima	David Rigert (URS)	Vasily Kolotov (URS)	Bo Johansson (SWE)
1972 Munich	Andon Nikolov (BUL)	Atanas Shopov (BUL)	Hans Bettembourg (SWE)
1973 Havana	David Rigert (URS)	Vasily Kolotov (URS)	Peter Petzold (GDR)
1974 Manila	David Rigert (URS)	Sergey Poltoratsky (URS)	Peter Petzold (GDR)
1975 Moscow	David Rigert (URS)	Sergey Poltoratsky (URS)	Peter Petzold (GDR)
1976 Montreal	David Rigert (URS)	Lee James (USA)	Atanas Shopov (BUL)
1977 Stuttgart	Sergey Poltoratsky (URS)	Rolf Milser (FRG)	Alberto Blanco (CUB)
1978 Gettysburg	Rolf Milser (FRG)	Gennady Bessonov (URS)	Ferenc Antalovics (HUN)
1979 Thessaloniki	Gennady Bessonov (URS)	Rolf Milser (FRG)	Witold Walo (POL)
1980 Moscow	Péter Baczakó (HUN)	Rumen Aleksandrov (BUL)	Frank Mantek (GDR)
1981 Lille	Blagoy Blagoev (BUL)	Yury Zakharevich (URS)	Lubomir Usherov (BUL)
1982 Ljubljana	Blagoy Blagoev (BUL)	Yurik Vardanyan (URS)	Frank Mantek (GDR)
1983 Moscow	Blagoy Blagoev (BUL)	Viktor Solodov (URS)	Andrzej Piotrowski (POL)
1984 Los Angeles	Nicu Vlad (ROU)	Petre Dumitru (ROU)	David Mercer (GBR)
1985 Södertälje	Anatoly Khrapaty (URS)	Shared gold	Piotr Krukowski (POL)
1985 Södertälje	Viktor Solodov (URS)	Shared gold	Piotr Krukowski (POL)
1986 Sofia	Anatoly Khrapaty (URS)	Viktor Solodov (URS)	Zoltán Balázsfi (HUN)
1987 Ostrava	Anatoly Khrapaty (URS)	Ivan Chakarov (BUL)	Sławomir Zawada (POL)
1989 Athens	Anatoly Khrapaty (URS)	Sergey Syrtsov (URS)	Ivan Chakarov (BUL)
1990 Budapest	Anatoly Khrapaty (URS)	Ivan Chakarov (BUL)	Kim Byung-chan (KOR)
1991 Donaueschingen	Sergey Syrtsov (URS)	Ivan Chakarov (BUL)	Kim Byung-chan (KOR)
1993 Melbourne	Ivan Chakarov (BUL)	Kakhi Kakhiashvili (GEO)	Anatoly Khrapaty (KAZ)
1994 Istanbul	Aleksey Petrov (RUS)	Akakios Kakiasvilis (GRE)	Viktor Belyatsky (BLR)
1995 Guangzhou	Igor Alekseyev (RUS)	Aleksander Karapetyan (ARM)	Andrey Makarov (KAZ)
1997 Chiang Mai	Maksim Agapitov (RUS)	Tadeusz Drzazga (POL)	Julio Luna (VEN)
1998 Lahti	Akakios Kakiasvilis (GRE)	Oliver Caruso (GER)	Leonidas Kokas (GRE)
1999 Athens	Akakios Kakiasvilis (GRE)	Szymon Kołecki (POL)	Leonidas Kokas (GRE)
2001 Antalya	Kourosh Bagheri (IRI)	Nizami Pashayev (AZE)	Szymon Kołecki (POL)
2002 Warsaw	Nizami Pashayev (AZE)	Milen Dobrev (BUL)	Oliver Caruso (GER)
2003 Vancouver	Milen Dobrev (BUL)	Hakan Yılmaz (TUR)	Vadim Vacarciuc (MDA)
2005 Doha	Nizami Pashayev (AZE)	Mukhamat Sozaev (RUS)	Milen Dobrev (BUL)
2006 Santo Domingo	Ilya Ilyin (KAZ)	Szymon Kołecki (POL)	Roman Konstantinov (RUS)
2007 Chiang Mai	Roman Konstantinov (RUS)	Yoandry Hernández (CUB)	Szymon Kołecki (POL)
2009 Goyang	Kim Min-jae (KOR)	Kim Seon-jong (KOR)	Andrey Demanov (RUS)
2010 Antalya	Aleksandr Ivanov (RUS)	Artem Ivanov (UKR)	Valeriu Calancea (ROU)
2011 Paris	Ilya Ilyin (KAZ)	Artem Ivanov (UKR)	Saeid Mohammadpour (IRI)
2013 Wrocław	Aleksandr Ivanov (RUS)	Almas Uteshov (KAZ)	Ramazan Rasulov (RUS)
2014 Almaty	Zhassulan Kydyrbayev (KAZ)	Aurimas Didžbalis (LTU)	Vadzim Straltsou (BLR)
2015 Houston	Vadzim Straltsou (BLR)	Adrian Zieliński (POL)	Dmytro Chumak (UKR)
2017 Anaheim	Sohrab Moradi (IRI)	Ayoub Mousavi (IRI)	Fares El-Bakh (QAT)
2018 Ashgabat	Sohrab Moradi (IRI)	Tian Tao (CHN)	Nicolae Onică (ROU)
2019 Pattaya	Tian Tao (CHN)	Fares El-Bakh (QAT)	Anton Pliesnoi (GEO)
2021 Tashkent	Lesman Paredes (COL)	Fares El-Bakh (QAT)	Keydomar Vallenilla (VEN)
2022 Bogotá	Lesman Paredes (BRN)	Nurgissa Adiletuly (KAZ)	Jhor Moreno (COL)
2023 Riyadh	Karim Abokahla (EGY)	Won Jong-beom (KOR)	Qasim Hasan (IRQ)
2024 Manama	Nurgissa Adiletuly (KAZ)	Revaz Davitadze (GEO)	Ali Alipour (IRI)
2025 Førde	Karlos Nasar (BUL)	Alireza Moeini (IRI)	Jokser Albornoz (COL)
2026 Ningbo	Karlos Nasar (BUL)	Nurgissa Adiletuly (KAZ)	Ali Alipour (IRI)

== First heavyweight ==
- 100 kg: 1977–1991
- 99 kg: 1993–1997
- 102 kg: 2018–2024

Games	Gold	Silver	Bronze
1977 Stuttgart	Anatoly Kozlov (URS)	Helmut Losch (GDR)	Michel Broillet (SUI)
1978 Gettysburg	David Rigert (URS)	Sergey Arakelov (URS)	Manfred Funke (GDR)
1979 Thessaloniki	Pavel Syrchin (URS)	János Sólyomvári (HUN)	Alberto Blanco (CUB)
1980 Moscow	Ota Zaremba (TCH)	Igor Nikitin (URS)	Alberto Blanco (CUB)
1981 Lille	Viktor Sots (URS)	Bruno Matykiewicz (TCH)	Veselin Osikovski (BUL)
1982 Ljubljana	Viktor Sots (URS)	Yury Zakharevich (URS)	Bruno Matykiewicz (TCH)
1983 Moscow	Pavel Kuznetsov (URS)	Aleksandr Popov (URS)	Andrzej Komar (POL)
1984 Los Angeles	Rolf Milser (FRG)	Vasile Groapă (ROU)	Pekka Niemi (FIN)
1985 Södertälje	Andor Szanyi (HUN)	Pavel Kuznetsov (URS)	Nicu Vlad (ROU)
1986 Sofia	Nicu Vlad (ROU)	Boris Seregin (URS)	Andor Szanyi (HUN)
1987 Ostrava	Pavel Kuznetsov (URS)	Nicu Vlad (ROU)	Andor Szanyi (HUN)
1989 Athens	Petar Stefanov (BUL)	Nicu Vlad (ROU)	Pavel Kuznetsov (URS)
1990 Budapest	Nicu Vlad (ROU)	Igor Sadykov (URS)	Sergey Kopytov (URS)
1991 Donaueschingen	Igor Sadykov (URS)	Ivalin Raychev (BUL)	Francis Tournefier (FRA)
1993 Melbourne	Viktor Tregubov (RUS)	Sergey Syrtsov (RUS)	Igor Sadykov (GER)
1994 Istanbul	Sergey Syrtsov (RUS)	Viktor Tregubov (RUS)	Stanislav Rybalchenko (UKR)
1995 Guangzhou	Akakios Kakiasvilis (GRE)	Sergey Syrtsov (RUS)	Anatoly Khrapaty (KAZ)
1997 Chiang Mai	Martin Tešovič (SVK)	Choi Jong-kun (KOR)	Oleksiy Obukhov (UKR)
2018 Ashgabat	Ali Hashemi (IRI)	Dmytro Chumak (UKR)	Reza Beiranvand (IRI)
2019 Pattaya	Yauheni Tsikhantsou (BLR)	Jin Yun-seong (KOR)	Reza Dehdar (IRI)
2021 Tashkent	Rasoul Motamedi (IRI)	Jin Yun-seong (KOR)	Amir Hoghoughi (IRI)
2022 Bogotá	Fares El-Bakh (QAT)	Reza Dehdar (IRI)	Samvel Gasparyan (ARM)
2023 Riyadh	Liu Huanhua (CHN)	Jang Yeon-hak (KOR)	Yauheni Tsikhantsou (AIN)
2024 Manama	Artyom Antropov (KAZ)	Fares El-Bakh (QAT)	Marcos Ruiz (ESP)

== Heavyweight ==
- Open: 1891–1904
- +80 kg: 1905–1913
- +82.5 kg: 1920–1950
- +90 kg: 1951–1968
- 110 kg: 1969–1991
- 108 kg: 1993–1997
- 105 kg: 1998–2017
- 109 kg: 2018–2024
- 110 kg: 2025–

Games	Gold	Silver	Bronze
1891 London	Edward Lawrence Levy (GBR)	Giacomo Zafarana (ITA)	Arthur François (BEL)
1898 Vienna	Wilhelm Türk (AUT)	Eduard Binder (AUT)	George Hackenschmidt (RUS)
1899 Milan	Sergey Yeliseyev (RUS)	Johannes Rödl (GER)	Enrico Scuri (ITA)
1903 Paris	François Lancoud (SUI)	Heinrich Schneidereit (GER)	Gustave Empain (BEL)
1904 Vienna	Josef Steinbach (AUT)	Josef Grafl (AUT)	Johann Staudinger (AUT)
1905 Berlin	Josef Steinbach (AUT)	Karl Witzelsberger (AUT)	Franz Pitka (AUT)
1905 Duisburg	Josef Steinbach (AUT)	Heinrich Neuhaus (GER)	Alois Selos (GER)
1905 Paris	Émile Schweitzer (FRA)	Jean-Pierre Péchaud (FRA)	Gustave Laqueille (FRA)
1906 Lille	Heinrich Schneidereit (GER)	Émile Besson (SUI)	Gustave Falleur (FRA)
1907 Frankfurt	Heinrich Rondi (GER)	Heinrich Schneidereit (GER)	Georg Schleidt (GER)
1908 Vienna	Josef Grafl (AUT)	Berthold Tandler (AUT)	Edmund Danzer (AUT)
1909 Vienna	Josef Grafl (AUT)	Karl Swoboda (AUT)	Berthold Tandler (AUT)
1910 Düsseldorf	Josef Grafl (AUT)	Heinrich Rondi (GER)	Berthold Tandler (AUT)
1910 Vienna	Josef Grafl (AUT)	Karl Swoboda (AUT)	Berthold Tandler (AUT)
1911 Stuttgart	Josef Grafl (AUT)	Heinrich Rondi (GER)	Heinrich Schneidereit (GER)
1911 Berlin	Karl Swoboda (AUT)	Berthold Tandler (AUT)	Franz Buchholz (GER)
1911 Dresden	Berthold Tandler (AUT)	Anton Dorregeest (NED)	Hermann Gäßler (GER)
1911 Vienna	Karl Swoboda (AUT)	Josef Grafl (AUT)	Berthold Tandler (AUT)
1913 Breslau	Josef Grafl (AUT)	Berthold Tandler (AUT)	Jan Krause (RUS)
1920 Vienna	Karl Mörke (GER)	Franz Aigner (AUT)	Heinrich Alscher (AUT)
1922 Tallinn	Harald Tammer (EST)	Kārlis Leilands (LAT)	Kaljo Raag (EST)
1923 Vienna	Franz Aigner (AUT)	Josef Leppelt (AUT)	Georg Schrammel (AUT)
1937 Paris	Josef Manger (GER)	Václav Pšenička (TCH)	Heinz Schattner (GER)
1938 Vienna	Josef Manger (GER)	Steve Stanko (USA)	Arnold Luhaäär (EST)
1946 Paris	John Davis (USA)	Yakov Kutsenko (URS)	Mohamed Geisa (EGY)
1947 Philadelphia	John Davis (USA)	Norbert Schemansky (USA)	Václav Bečvář (TCH)
1949 Scheveningen	John Davis (USA)	Niels Petersen (DEN)	Robert Allart (BEL)
1950 Paris	John Davis (USA)	Yakov Kutsenko (URS)	Joseph Barnett (GBR)
1951 Milan	John Davis (USA)	James Bradford (USA)	Mohamed Geisa (EGY)
1953 Stockholm	Doug Hepburn (CAN)	John Davis (USA)	Humberto Selvetti (ARG)
1954 Vienna	Norbert Schemansky (USA)	James Bradford (USA)	Franz Hölbl (AUT)
1955 Munich	Paul Anderson (USA)	James Bradford (USA)	Eino Mäkinen (FIN)
1957 Tehran	Aleksey Medvedev (URS)	Humberto Selvetti (ARG)	Alberto Pigaiani (ITA)
1958 Stockholm	Aleksey Medvedev (URS)	Dave Ashman (USA)	Firouz Pojhan (IRI)
1959 Warsaw	Yury Vlasov (URS)	James Bradford (USA)	Ivan Veselinov (BUL)
1961 Vienna	Yury Vlasov (URS)	Richard Zirk (USA)	Eino Mäkinen (FIN)
1962 Budapest	Yury Vlasov (URS)	Norbert Schemansky (USA)	Gary Gubner (USA)
1963 Stockholm	Yury Vlasov (URS)	Norbert Schemansky (USA)	Leonid Zhabotinsky (URS)
1964 Tokyo	Leonid Zhabotinsky (URS)	Yury Vlasov (URS)	Norbert Schemansky (USA)
1965 Tehran	Leonid Zhabotinsky (URS)	Gary Gubner (USA)	Károly Ecser (HUN)
1966 East Berlin	Leonid Zhabotinsky (URS)	Bob Bednarski (USA)	Stanislav Batishchev (URS)
1968 Mexico City	Leonid Zhabotinsky (URS)	Serge Reding (BEL)	Joseph Dube (USA)
1969 Warsaw	Bob Bednarski (USA)	Jaan Talts (URS)	Kauko Kangasniemi (FIN)
1970 Columbus	Jaan Talts (URS)	Aleksandar Kraychev (BUL)	Bob Bednarski (USA)
1971 Lima	Yury Kozin (URS)	Stefan Grützner (GDR)	Aleksandar Kraychev (BUL)
1972 Munich	Jaan Talts (URS)	Aleksandar Kraychev (BUL)	Stefan Grützner (GDR)
1973 Havana	Pavel Pervushin (URS)	Helmut Losch (GDR)	Javier González (CUB)
1974 Manila	Valery Ustyuzhin (URS)	Jürgen Ciezki (GDR)	Yury Zaitsev (URS)
1975 Moscow	Valentin Hristov (BUL)	Vasily Mazheikov (URS)	Jürgen Ciezki (GDR)
1976 Montreal	Yury Zaitsev (URS)	Krastyu Semerdzhiev (BUL)	Tadeusz Rutkowski (POL)
1977 Stuttgart	Valentin Hristov (BUL)	Yury Zaitsev (URS)	Jürgen Ciezki (GDR)
1978 Gettysburg	Yury Zaitsev (URS)	Jürgen Ciezki (GDR)	Leif Nilsson (SWE)
1979 Thessaloniki	Sergey Arakelov (URS)	Valentin Hristov (BUL)	Leonid Taranenko (URS)
1980 Moscow	Leonid Taranenko (URS)	Valentin Hristov (BUL)	György Szalai (HUN)
1981 Lille	Valery Kravchuk (URS)	Vyacheslav Klokov (URS)	Plamen Asparukhov (BUL)
1982 Ljubljana	Sergey Arakelov (URS)	Vyacheslav Klokov (URS)	Anton Baraniak (TCH)
1983 Moscow	Vyacheslav Klokov (URS)	József Jacsó (HUN)	Anton Baraniak (TCH)
1984 Los Angeles	Norberto Oberburger (ITA)	Ștefan Tașnadi (ROU)	Guy Carlton (USA)
1985 Södertälje	Yury Zakharevich (URS)	Miloš Čiernik (TCH)	Norberto Oberburger (ITA)
1986 Sofia	Yury Zakharevich (URS)	Sergey Nagirny (URS)	József Jacsó (HUN)
1987 Ostrava	Yury Zakharevich (URS)	József Jacsó (HUN)	Anton Baraniak (TCH)
1989 Athens	Stefan Botev (BUL)	Andrew Davies (GBR)	Mirosław Dąbrowski (POL)
1990 Budapest	Stefan Botev (BUL)	Nail Mukhamedyarov (URS)	Pavlos Saltsidis (GRE)
1991 Donaueschingen	Artur Akoyev (URS)	Ronny Weller (GER)	Ernesto Montoya (CUB)
1993 Melbourne	Timur Taymazov (UKR)	Stefan Botev (AUS)	Ihor Razoronov (UKR)
1994 Istanbul	Timur Taymazov (UKR)	Nicu Vlad (AUS)	Artur Akoyev (RUS)
1995 Guangzhou	Ihor Razoronov (UKR)	Cui Wenhua (CHN)	Sergey Flerko (RUS)
1997 Chiang Mai	Cui Wenhua (CHN)	Mariusz Jędra (POL)	Wes Barnett (USA)
1998 Lahti	Ihor Razoronov (UKR)	Cui Wenhua (CHN)	Denys Hotfrid (UKR)
1999 Athens	Denys Hotfrid (UKR)	Evgeny Shishlyannikov (RUS)	Choi Jong-kun (KOR)
2001 Antalya	Vladimir Smorchkov (RUS)	Bünyamin Sudaş (TUR)	Ihor Razoronov (UKR)
2002 Warsaw	Denys Hotfrid (UKR)	Alan Tsagaev (BUL)	Vladimir Smorchkov (RUS)
2003 Vancouver	Said Saif Asaad (QAT)	Vladimir Smorchkov (RUS)	Bünyamin Sudaş (TUR)
2005 Doha	Dmitry Klokov (RUS)	Alexandru Bratan (MDA)	Martin Tešovič (SVK)
2006 Santo Domingo	Marcin Dołęga (POL)	Dmitry Lapikov (RUS)	Dmitry Klokov (RUS)
2007 Chiang Mai	Andrei Aramnau (BLR)	Alan Tsagaev (BUL)	Dmitry Klokov (RUS)
2009 Goyang	Marcin Dołęga (POL)	Roman Konstantinov (RUS)	Oleksiy Torokhtiy (UKR)
2010 Antalya	Marcin Dołęga (POL)	Dmitry Klokov (RUS)	Vladimir Smorchkov (RUS)
2011 Paris	Khadzhimurat Akkaev (RUS)	Dmitry Klokov (RUS)	Oleksiy Torokhtiy (UKR)
2013 Wrocław	Ruslan Nurudinov (UZB)	David Bedzhanyan (RUS)	Bartłomiej Bonk (POL)
2014 Almaty	Ilya Ilyin (KAZ)	Ruslan Nurudinov (UZB)	David Bedzhanyan (RUS)
2015 Houston	Alexandr Zaichikov (KAZ)	David Bedzhanyan (RUS)	Artūrs Plēsnieks (LAT)
2017 Anaheim	Ali Hashemi (IRI)	Artūrs Plēsnieks (LAT)	Ivan Efremov (UZB)
2018 Ashgabat	Simon Martirosyan (ARM)	Yang Zhe (CHN)	Arkadiusz Michalski (POL)
2019 Pattaya	Simon Martirosyan (ARM)	Andrei Aramnau (BLR)	Yang Zhe (CHN)
2021 Tashkent	Akbar Djuraev (UZB)	Ruslan Nurudinov (UZB)	Simon Martirosyan (ARM)
2022 Bogotá	Ruslan Nurudinov (UZB)	Giorgi Chkheidze (GEO)	Rafael Cerro (COL)
2023 Riyadh	Akbar Djuraev (UZB)	Ruslan Nurudinov (UZB)	Dadash Dadashbayli (AZE)
2024 Manama	Ruslan Nurudinov (UZB)	Dadash Dadashbayli (AZE)	Mehdi Karami (IRI)
2025 Førde	Akbar Djuraev (UZB)	Alireza Nassiri (IRI)	Ruslan Nurudinov (UZB)
2026 Ningbo	Akbar Djuraev (UZB)	Alireza Nassiri (IRI)	Şahzadbek Matýakubow (TKM)

== Super heavyweight ==
- +110 kg: 1969–1991
- +108 kg: 1993–1997
- +105 kg: 1998–2017
- +109 kg: 2018–2024
- +110 kg: 2025–

Games	Gold	Silver	Bronze
1969 Warsaw	Joseph Dube (USA)	Serge Reding (BEL)	Stanislav Batishchev (URS)
1970 Columbus	Vasily Alekseyev (URS)	Serge Reding (BEL)	Kalevi Lahdenranta (FIN)
1971 Lima	Vasily Alekseyev (URS)	Ken Patera (USA)	Ivan Atanasov (BUL)
1972 Munich	Vasily Alekseyev (URS)	Rudolf Mang (FRG)	Gerd Bonk (GDR)
1973 Havana	Vasily Alekseyev (URS)	Rudolf Mang (FRG)	Stanislav Batishchev (URS)
1974 Manila	Vasily Alekseyev (URS)	Serge Reding (BEL)	Jürgen Heuser (GDR)
1975 Moscow	Vasily Alekseyev (URS)	Gerd Bonk (GDR)	Hristo Plachkov (BUL)
1976 Montreal	Vasily Alekseyev (URS)	Gerd Bonk (GDR)	Helmut Losch (GDR)
1977 Stuttgart	Vasily Alekseyev (URS)	Aslanbek Yenaldiev (URS)	Jürgen Heuser (GDR)
1978 Gettysburg	Jürgen Heuser (GDR)	Sultan Rakhmanov (URS)	Gerd Bonk (GDR)
1979 Thessaloniki	Sultan Rakhmanov (URS)	Jürgen Heuser (GDR)	Gerd Bonk (GDR)
1980 Moscow	Sultan Rakhmanov (URS)	Jürgen Heuser (GDR)	Tadeusz Rutkowski (POL)
1981 Lille	Anatoly Pisarenko (URS)	Senno Salzwedel (GDR)	Tadeusz Rutkowski (POL)
1982 Ljubljana	Anatoly Pisarenko (URS)	Antonio Krastev (BUL)	Bohuslav Braum (TCH)
1983 Moscow	Anatoly Pisarenko (URS)	Aleksandr Kurlovich (URS)	Antonio Krastev (BUL)
1984 Los Angeles	Dean Lukin (AUS)	Mario Martinez (USA)	Manfred Nerlinger (FRG)
1985 Södertälje	Antonio Krastev (BUL)	Aleksandr Gunyashev (URS)	Manfred Nerlinger (FRG)
1986 Sofia	Antonio Krastev (BUL)	Manfred Nerlinger (FRG)	Robert Skolimowski (POL)
1987 Ostrava	Aleksandr Kurlovich (URS)	Leonid Taranenko (URS)	Antonio Krastev (BUL)
1989 Athens	Aleksandr Kurlovich (URS)	Rizvan Geliskhanov (URS)	Michael Schubert (GDR)
1990 Budapest	Leonid Taranenko (URS)	Artur Akoyev (URS)	Jiří Zubrický (TCH)
1991 Donaueschingen	Aleksandr Kurlovich (URS)	Manfred Nerlinger (GER)	Kim Tae-hyun (KOR)
1993 Melbourne	Ronny Weller (GER)	Manfred Nerlinger (GER)	Andrey Chemerkin (RUS)
1994 Istanbul	Aleksandr Kurlovich (BLR)	Andrey Chemerkin (RUS)	Stefan Botev (AUS)
1995 Guangzhou	Andrey Chemerkin (RUS)	Ronny Weller (GER)	Stefan Botev (AUS)
1997 Chiang Mai	Andrey Chemerkin (RUS)	Ronny Weller (GER)	Viktors Ščerbatihs (LAT)
1998 Lahti	Andrey Chemerkin (RUS)	Ara Vardanyan (ARM)	Viktors Ščerbatihs (LAT)
1999 Athens	Andrey Chemerkin (RUS)	Jaber Saeed Salem (QAT)	Hossein Rezazadeh (IRI)
2001 Antalya	Jaber Saeed Salem (QAT)	Roman Meshcheryakov (RUS)	Andrey Chemerkin (RUS)
2002 Warsaw	Hossein Rezazadeh (IRI)	Damyan Damyanov (BUL)	Artem Udachyn (UKR)
2003 Vancouver	Hossein Rezazadeh (IRI)	Velichko Cholakov (BUL)	Viktors Ščerbatihs (LAT)
2005 Doha	Hossein Rezazadeh (IRI)	Evgeny Chigishev (RUS)	Jaber Saeed Salem (QAT)
2006 Santo Domingo	Hossein Rezazadeh (IRI)	Artem Udachyn (UKR)	Dong Feng (CHN)
2007 Chiang Mai	Viktors Ščerbatihs (LAT)	Evgeny Chigishev (RUS)	Jaber Saeed Salem (QAT)
2009 Goyang	An Yong-kwon (KOR)	Artem Udachyn (UKR)	Ihor Shymechko (UKR)
2010 Antalya	Behdad Salimi (IRI)	Matthias Steiner (GER)	Artem Udachyn (UKR)
2011 Paris	Behdad Salimi (IRI)	Sajjad Anoushiravani (IRI)	Jeon Sang-guen (KOR)
2013 Wrocław	Ruslan Albegov (RUS)	Bahador Molaei (IRI)	Aleksey Lovchev (RUS)
2014 Almaty	Ruslan Albegov (RUS)	Behdad Salimi (IRI)	Mohamed Ihsan (EGY)
2015 Houston	Lasha Talakhadze (GEO)	Mart Seim (EST)	Gor Minasyan (ARM)
2017 Anaheim	Lasha Talakhadze (GEO)	Saeid Alihosseini (IRI)	Behdad Salimi (IRI)
2018 Ashgabat	Lasha Talakhadze (GEO)	Gor Minasyan (ARM)	Fernando Reis (BRA)
2019 Pattaya	Lasha Talakhadze (GEO)	Gor Minasyan (ARM)	Ruben Aleksanyan (ARM)
2021 Tashkent	Lasha Talakhadze (GEO)	Varazdat Lalayan (ARM)	Gor Minasyan (ARM)
2022 Bogotá	Lasha Talakhadze (GEO)	Gor Minasyan (BRN)	Varazdat Lalayan (ARM)
2023 Riyadh	Lasha Talakhadze (GEO)	Varazdat Lalayan (ARM)	Gor Minasyan (BRN)
2024 Manama	Varazdat Lalayan (ARM)	Ali Davoudi (IRI)	Alireza Yousefi (IRI)
2025 Førde	Varazdat Lalayan (ARM)	Gor Minasyan (BRN)	Song Yeong-hwan (KOR)
2026 Ningbo	Ali Ammar (IRQ)	Alireza Yousefi (IRI)	Varazdat Lalayan (ARM)

== Medal table ==
Rank	Nation	Gold	Silver	Bronze	Total
1	Soviet Union	151	90	33	274
2	Bulgaria	78	62	43	183
3	China	54	45	35	134
4	United States	37	38	21	96
5	Austria	32	27	31	90
6	Iran	25	20	32	77
7	Germany	24	34	27	85
8	Poland	23	36	56	115
9	Russia	21	26	20	67
10	North Korea	17	16	13	46
11	Turkey	14	12	10	36
12	Egypt	11	12	12	35
13	Japan	10	7	21	38
14	Kazakhstan	10	6	6	22
15	Hungary	9	27	30	66
16	Greece	8	9	5	22
17	Georgia	8	5	5	18
18	Cuba	8	4	11	23
19	Uzbekistan	8	4	5	17
20	France	7	11	18	36
21	Belarus	7	4	6	17
22	South Korea	6	12	12	30
23	Armenia	6	10	12	28
24	Ukraine	6	6	12	24
25	Romania	5	13	11	29
26	Qatar	5	4	4	13
27	Great Britain	5	3	5	13
28	East Germany	4	19	29	52
29	Indonesia	4	9	4	17
30	Colombia	4	5	9	18
31	Switzerland	4	4	2	10
32	Thailand	4	3	4	11
33	West Germany	3	5	3	11
34	Estonia	3	4	6	13
35	Czechoslovakia	3	3	15	21
36	Italy	2	6	9	17
37	Vietnam	2	4	5	11
38	Azerbaijan	2	2	4	8
39	Finland	2	1	9	12
40	Latvia	1	3	5	9
41	Australia	1	3	4	8
42	Norway	1	3	0	4
43	Chinese Taipei	1	2	3	6
44	Bahrain	1	2	1	4
44	Canada	1	2	1	4
44	Turkmenistan	1	2	1	4
47	Sweden	1	1	6	8
48	Venezuela	1	0	4	5
49	Iraq	1	0	2	3
50	Slovakia	1	0	1	2
51	Chile	1	0	0	1
52	Belgium	0	4	3	7
53	Denmark	0	3	0	3
54	Netherlands	0	2	0	2
55	Moldova	0	1	5	6
56	Argentina	0	1	1	2
56	Brazil	0	1	1	2
58	Albania	0	1	0	1
58	Croatia	0	1	0	1
58	Guyana	0	1	0	1
58	Lebanon	0	1	0	1
58	Lithuania	0	1	0	1
58	Malaysia	0	1	0	1
64	Myanmar	0	0	2	2
64	Saudi Arabia	0	0	2	2
66	Philippines	0	0	1	1
66	Russian Weightlifting Federation (Note: At the 2021 World Championships, in accordance with a ban by the World Anti-Doping Agency (WADA) and a decision by the Court of Arbitration for Sport (CAS), weightlifters from Russia were not permitted to use the Russian name, flag, or anthem. They instead participated under the name and the modified flag of the Russian Weightlifting Federation (RWF).)	0	0	1	1
66	Spain	0	0	1	1
66	Tunisia	0	0	1	1
–	Individual Neutral Athletes (Note: At the 2023 World Championships, in accordance with sanctions imposed following by the 2022 Russian invasion of Ukraine, weightlifters from Belarus were not permitted to use the name, flag, or anthem of Belarus. They instead participated as "Individual Neutral Athletes (AIN)", their medals were not included in the official medal table.)	0	0	1	1
Totals (69 entries)		644	644	642	1,930

- Names in italic are national entities that no longer exist.

== See also ==
- List of Olympic medalists in weightlifting
