= 1951 World Weightlifting Championships =

International weightlifting competition

1951 Men's World Championships

The 1951 Men's World Weightlifting Championships were held in Palazzo del Ghiaccio, Milan, Italy from October 26 to October 28, 1951. There were 62 men in action from 14 nations.

== Medal summary ==
Event	Gold		Silver		Bronze	
Bantamweight; 56 kg	Mahmoud Namjoo; Iran	317.5 kg	Ali Mirzaei; Iran	305.0 kg	Kamal Mahgoub; Egypt	292.5 kg
Featherweight; 60 kg	Said Khalifa Gouda; Egypt	310.0 kg	Johan Runge; Denmark	310.0 kg	Julian Creus; Great Britain	302.5 kg
Lightweight; 67.5 kg	Ibrahim Shams; Egypt	342.5 kg	Joe Pitman; United States	337.5 kg	Hassan Ferdos; Iran	327.5 kg
Middleweight; 75 kg	Pete George; United States	395.0 kg	Dave Sheppard; United States	395.0 kg	Khadr El-Touni; Egypt	387.5 kg
Light heavyweight 82.5 kg	Stanley Stanczyk; United States	402.5 kg	Jean Debuf; France	392.5 kg	Hassan Rahnavardi; Iran	387.5 kg
Middle heavyweight 90 kg	Norbert Schemansky; United States	427.5 kg	Mohamed Ibrahim Saleh; Egypt	395.0 kg	Firouz Pojhan; Iran	370.0 kg
Heavyweight +90 kg	John Davis; United States	432.5 kg	James Bradford; United States	427.5 kg	Mohamed Geisa; Egypt	407.5 kg

== Medal table ==
Rank	Nation	Gold	Silver	Bronze	Total
1	United States	4	3	0	7
2	Egypt	2	1	3	6
3	Iran	1	1	3	5
4	Denmark	0	1	0	1
4	France	0	1	0	1
6	Great Britain	0	0	1	1
Totals (6 entries)		7	7	7	21
