= 1962 World Weightlifting Championships =

International weightlifting competition

1962 Men's World Championships

The 1962 Men's World Weightlifting Championships were held in Budapest, Hungary from September 16 to September 22, 1962. There were 113 men in action from 27 nations. These world championships were combined with European championships.

== Medal summary ==
Event	Gold		Silver		Bronze	
Bantamweight; 56 kg	Yoshinobu Miyake; Japan	352.5 kg	Imre Földi; Hungary	337.5 kg	Vladimir Stogov; Soviet Union	330.0 kg
Featherweight; 60 kg	Yevgeny Minayev; Soviet Union	362.5 kg	Yevgeny Katsura; Soviet Union	357.5 kg	Rudolf Kozłowski; Poland	352.5 kg
Lightweight; 67.5 kg	Vladimir Kaplunov; Soviet Union	415.0 kg	Waldemar Baszanowski; Poland	412.5 kg	Marian Zieliński; Poland	405.0 kg
Middleweight; 75 kg	Aleksandr Kurynov; Soviet Union	422.5 kg	Mihály Huszka; Hungary	415.0 kg	Mohammad Ami-Tehrani; Iran	412.5 kg
Light heavyweight 82.5 kg	Győző Veres; Hungary	460.0 kg	Tommy Kono; United States	455.0 kg	Géza Tóth; Hungary	442.5 kg
Middle heavyweight 90 kg	Louis Martin; Great Britain	480.0 kg	Ireneusz Paliński; Poland	470.0 kg	William March; United States	460.0 kg
Heavyweight +90 kg	Yury Vlasov; Soviet Union	540.0 kg	Norbert Schemansky; United States	537.5 kg	Gary Gubner; United States	497.5 kg

== Medal table ==
Rank	Nation	Gold	Silver	Bronze	Total
1	Soviet Union	4	1	1	6
2	Hungary	1	2	1	4
3	Great Britain	1	0	0	1
3	Japan	1	0	0	1
5	Poland	0	2	2	4
5	United States	0	2	2	4
7	Iran	0	0	1	1
Totals (7 entries)		7	7	7	21
