= 1953 World Weightlifting Championships =

International weightlifting competition

1953 Men's World Championships

The 1953 Men's World Weightlifting Championships were held in Stockholm, Sweden from August 26 to August 28, 1953. There were 70 men in action from 19 nations.

== Medal summary ==
Event	Gold		Silver		Bronze	
Bantamweight; 56 kg	Ivan Udodov; Soviet Union	315.0 kg	Kamal Mahgoub; Egypt	295.0 kg	Karel Saitl; Czechoslovakia	280.0 kg
Featherweight; 60 kg	Nikolay Saksonov; Soviet Union	337.5 kg	Rafael Chimishkyan; Soviet Union	332.5 kg	Einar Eriksson; Sweden	307.5 kg
Lightweight; 67.5 kg	Pete George; United States	370.0 kg	Dmitry Ivanov; Soviet Union	365.0 kg	Said Khalifa Gouda; Egypt	355.0 kg
Middleweight; 75 kg	Tommy Kono; United States	407.5 kg	Dave Sheppard; United States	397.5 kg	Yury Duganov; Soviet Union	382.5 kg
Light heavyweight 82.5 kg	Arkady Vorobyov; Soviet Union	430.0 kg	Trofim Lomakin; Soviet Union	427.5 kg	Stanley Stanczyk; United States	415.0 kg
Middle heavyweight 90 kg	Norbert Schemansky; United States	442.5 kg	Mohamed Ibrahim Saleh; Egypt	400.0 kg	Mohamed Ali Abdelkerim; Egypt	385.0 kg
Heavyweight +90 kg	Doug Hepburn; Canada	467.5 kg	John Davis; United States	457.5 kg	Humberto Selvetti; Argentina	450.0 kg

== Medal table ==
Rank	Nation	Gold	Silver	Bronze	Total
1	Soviet Union	3	3	1	7
2	United States	3	2	1	6
3	Canada	1	0	0	1
4	Egypt	0	2	2	4
5	Argentina	0	0	1	1
5	Czechoslovakia	0	0	1	1
5	Sweden	0	0	1	1
Totals (7 entries)		7	7	7	21
