= 1954 World Weightlifting Championships =

Event held in 1954 in Vienna, Austria

1954 Men's World Championships

The 1954 Men's World Weightlifting Championships were held in Vienna, Austria from October 7 to October 10, 1954. There were 100 men in action from 23 nations.

== Medal summary ==
Event	Gold		Silver		Bronze	
Bantamweight; 56 kg	Bakir Farkhutdinov; Soviet Union	315.0 kg	Mahmoud Namjoo; Iran	307.5 kg	Ali Mirzaei; Iran	302.5 kg
Featherweight; 60 kg	Rafael Chimishkyan; Soviet Union	350.0 kg	Ivan Udodov; Soviet Union	350.0 kg	Nil Tun Maung; Burma	330.0 kg
Lightweight; 67.5 kg	Dmitry Ivanov; Soviet Union	367.5 kg	Said Khalifa Gouda; Egypt	355.0 kg	Josef Tauchner; Austria	352.5 kg
Middleweight; 75 kg	Pete George; United States	405.0 kg	Fyodor Bogdanovsky; Soviet Union	402.5 kg	Stanley Stanczyk; United States	390.0 kg
Light heavyweight 82.5 kg	Tommy Kono; United States	435.0 kg	Trofim Lomakin; Soviet Union	427.5 kg	Jean Debuf; France	405.0 kg
Middle heavyweight 90 kg	Arkady Vorobyov; Soviet Union	460.0 kg	Dave Sheppard; United States	440.0 kg	Clyde Emrich; United States	427.5 kg
Heavyweight +90 kg	Norbert Schemansky; United States	487.5 kg	James Bradford; United States	462.5 kg	Franz Hölbl; Austria	425.0 kg

== Medal table ==
Rank	Nation	Gold	Silver	Bronze	Total
1	Soviet Union	4	3	0	7
2	United States	3	2	2	7
3	Iran	0	1	1	2
4	Egypt	0	1	0	1
5	Austria	0	0	2	2
6	Burma	0	0	1	1
6	France	0	0	1	1
Totals (7 entries)		7	7	7	21
