= Weightlifting at the 1906 Intercalated Games =

At the 1906 Summer Olympics in Athens, two weightlifting events were contested. Now called the Intercalated Games, the 1906 Games are no longer considered as an official Olympic Games by the International Olympic Committee.

== Medal summary ==
| Event | Gold | Silver | Bronze |
|---|---|---|---|
| One hand lift | Josef Steinbach; Austria | Tullio Camillotti; Italy | Heinrich Schneidereit; Germany |
| Two hand lift | Dimitrios Tofalos; Greece | Josef Steinbach; Austria | Alexandre Maspoli; France |
| Two hand lift | Dimitrios Tofalos; Greece | Josef Steinbach; Austria | Heinrich Schneidereit; Germany |
| Two hand lift | Dimitrios Tofalos; Greece | Josef Steinbach; Austria | Heinrich Rondl; Germany |

== Postcards of weight lifting in the 1906 Olympics ==
A number of postcards, then at its peak, were published by various printhouses. The following were printed in Corfu, Greece, by the Aspiotis brothers.

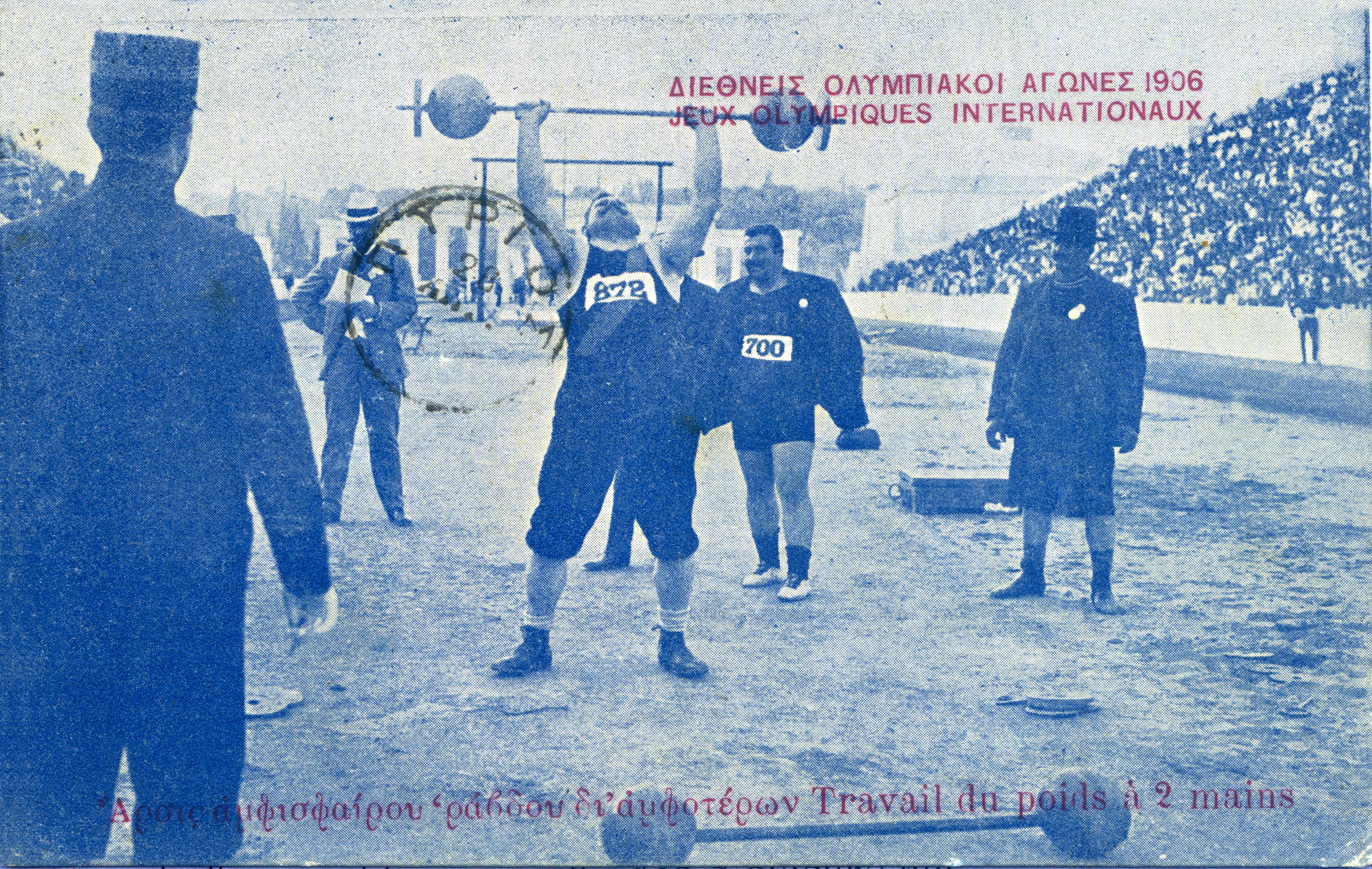
Bar bell lifting with 2 hands

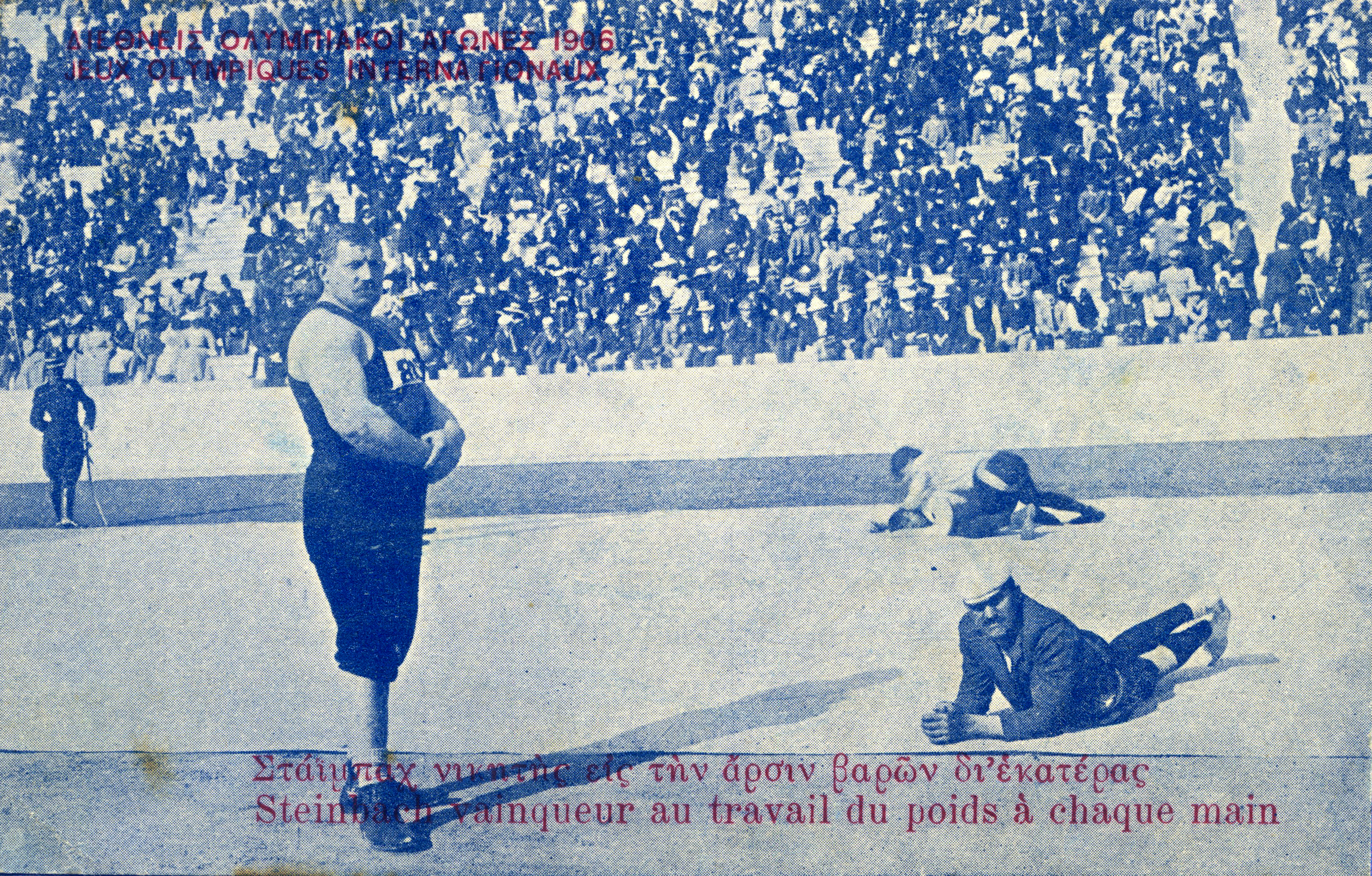
Steinbach, winner in weight lifting

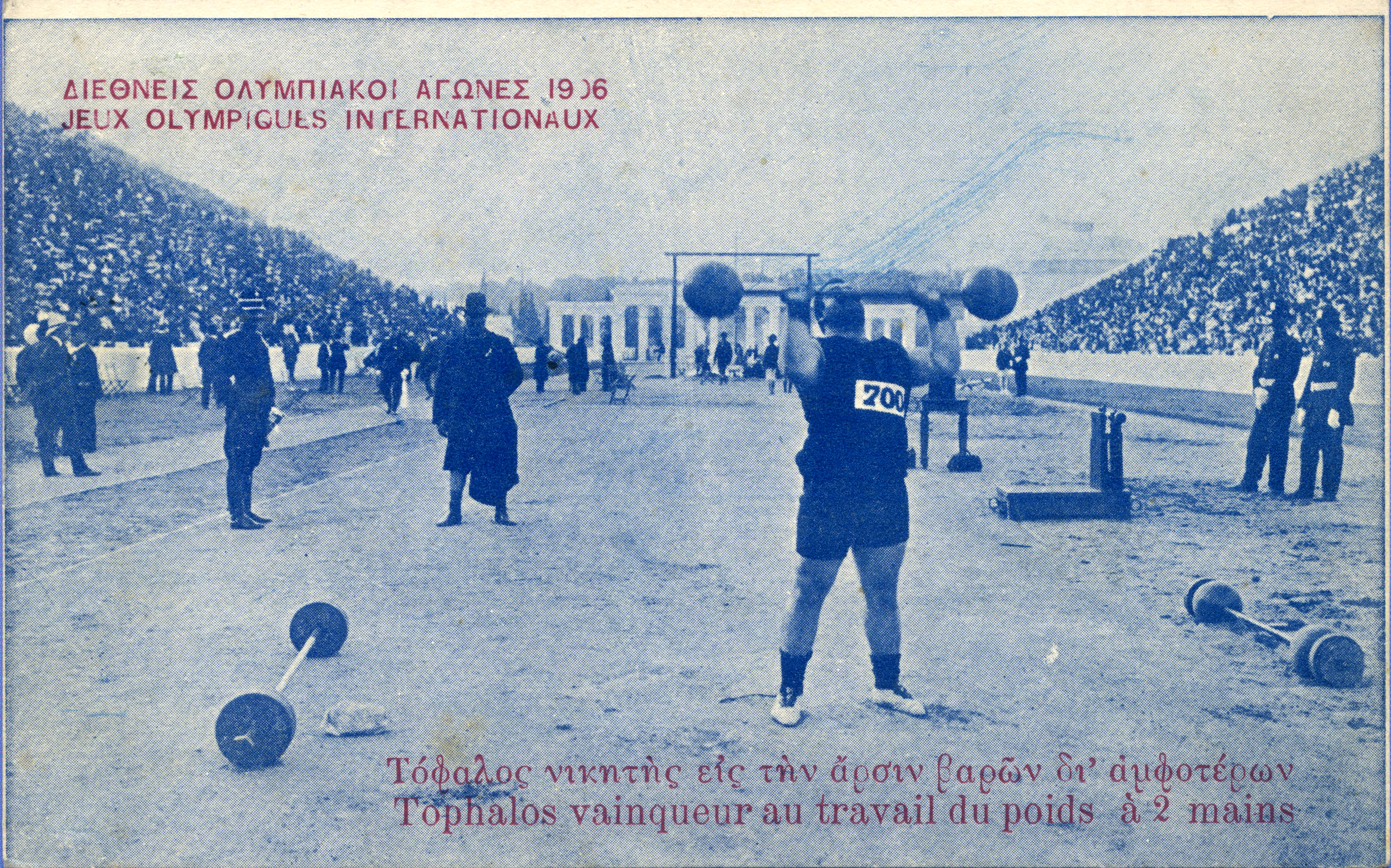
Weight lifting with 2 hands. Tofalos winner

== Medal table ==
| Rank | Nation | Gold | Silver | Bronze | Total |
|---|---|---|---|---|---|
| 1 | Austria | 1 | 1 | 0 | 2 |
| 2 | Greece | 1 | 0 | 0 | 1 |
| 3 | Italy | 0 | 1 | 0 | 1 |
| 4 | Germany | 0 | 0 | 3 | 3 |
| 5 | France | 0 | 0 | 1 | 1 |
| Totals (5 entries) | | 2 | 2 | 4 | 8 |
