= International Weightlifting Federation =

International weightlifting governing body

- Abbreviation: IWF
- Formation: 10 June 1905; 121 years ago / 23 August 1920
- Founded at: Duisburg, Germany
- Type: Sports Federation
- Headquarters: Lausanne, Switzerland
- Region served: Worldwide
- Official language: English
- President: (Iraq) Mohamed Hassan Jaloud
- Affiliations: International Olympic Committee
- Revenue: US$4.10 million (2018)
- Expenses: US$9.19 million (2018)
- Website: iwf.sport

The International Weightlifting Federation, aka IWF, is the international governing body for the sport of Weightlifting. Headquartered in Lausanne, Switzerland, it has 193 affiliated national federations. Mohammed Hasan Jalood has been its president since June 2022.

The IWF organizes the World Weightlifting Championships, as well as world championship events for Youth and Juniors. It also cooperates with the International Olympic Committee in the organization of Weightlifting events at the Olympic Games; however, weightlifting's inclusion in the 2028 Olympics is uncertain, due to doping issues within the sport, and governance issues within IWF, and weightlifting's inclusion is expected to be decided by an IOC meeting in 2023. Weightlifting was scheduled as a sport in the 2024 Olympics but with reduced numbers of athletes and events.

IWF traces its history to the formation of the "Amateur-Athleten-Weltunion" (Amateur Athletes World Union) in 1905.

== History ==
The IWF's predecessor organization, the "Amateur-Athleten-Weltunion" (Amateur Athletes World Union) was founded on June 10, 1905, in Duisburg, Germany. This organization governed both weightlifting and wrestling. In 1912 this became the "Internationaler Weltverband für Schwerathletik" (International Federation of Heavy Athletics), adding "Amateur" in 1913 to become the "Internationaler Amateur-Weltverband für Schwerathletik."

In 1920, the federation split into separate organizations for weightlifting and wrestling, creating the Fédération Internationale de Poids et Halteres (International Federation of Weights and Dumbbells) for weightlifters, which then became the Fédération Haltérophile International (FHI). In 1972, the Federation officially changed to the English version of this name by which it is now known—the International Weightlifting Federation.

=== Brief ===
1. 1905 - Amateur Athleten Weltunion (Amateur Athletes World Union).
2. 1912 - Internationaler Weltverband für Schwerathletik (International Federation of Heavy Athletics).
3. 1913 - Internationaler Amateur-Weltverband für Schwerathletik (International Federation of Heavy Amateur Athletics).
4. 1920 - Fédération Internationale de Poids et Halteres (International Federation of Weights and Dumbbells) for weightlifters and after rename to Fédération Haltérophile International (FHI).
5. 1972 - International Weightlifting Federation (IWF).

=== First year ===
1. Founded: 23 August 1920
2. Weightlifting at the 1920 Summer Olympics: 29 August 1920
3. 1920 World Weightlifting Championships: 4-8 September 1920

== Tournaments ==
- World Weightlifting Championships
- Junior World Weightlifting Championships
- Youth World Weightlifting Championships
- IWF World Cup
- IWF Grand Prix

== Awards ==
- IWF World Weightlifter of the Year

== Corruption, governance and doping scandals ==
In 2020 an investigative television program, broadcast on the German TV network ARD, exposed doping and corruption scandals within the sport. A subsequent investigation into the IWF found that doping – a historic problem within the sport – was exacerbated by systematic governance failures, corruption, and doping cover-ups at the highest level of IWF; with Tamás Aján, president of IWF from 2000 to 2020, being found guilty by the Court of Arbitration for Sport of charges relating to tampering, fraudulent conduct and complicity in covering-up years of doping cases.

Citing endemic corruption in IWF, and widespread doping issues, the International Olympic Committee has threatened to drop weightlifting entirely from the Olympics unless substantial reforms are made to the sport.

Consequently, as of 2021, weightlifting isn't in the lineup of the 2028 Olympics. There is, nevertheless, a pathway for weightlifting's potential inclusion, if all issues are satisfactorily addressed by the new leadership of IWF before a key meeting of the International Olympic Committee in 2023. The IOC requires the IWF to demonstrate its transition "towards compliance and an effective change of culture", successfully address doping within the sport and "ensure the integrity, robustness, and full independence of its anti-doping programme."

In 2020, in response to the scandal, IWF, being temporarily run by interim acting president Ursula Papandrea, initiated the relocation of its headquarters from Aján's home city of Budapest to Lausanne, Switzerland, where the headquarters of the IOC is also located. In June 2022, a new IWF executive board was elected by IWF's member federations, with the new president Mohammed Hasan Jalood saying he is "dedicated" to "positive change".

Weightlifting was scheduled as part of the 2024 Olympics program in Paris, although with reduced numbers of athletes, weight classes, and events.

== Response to Russian invasion of Ukraine ==
In response to the 2022 Russian invasion of Ukraine, the IWF suspended athletes, coaches, and support personnel from Russia and Belarus on March 3, 2022, and forbade Russia from hosting any IWF competitions.

In January 2023, the IWF stated: "The IWF stands in solidarity with Ukraine and reaffirms its support for the IOC’s sanctions against the Russian and Belarusian State and Government. The IWF believes strongly in the unifying mission of sport and the Olympic Movement and welcomes the exploration of a pathway for Russian and Belarusian athletes to compete under strict conditions. The IWF will uphold the current protective measures in place while this pathway is considered."

On 23 January 2026, the IWF has lifted restrictions on Russian juniors participating in international tournaments.

On 26 June 2026, all restrictions on Russian athletes were lifted, with Russia fully reinstated.

== Continental federations ==
IWF's affiliated continental federations are:

- Weightlifting Federation of Africa
- Asian Weightlifting Federation
- European Weightlifting Federation
- Oceania Weightlifting Federation
- Pan American Weightlifting Federation

== See also ==
- International Powerlifting Federation
