= 1906 World Weightlifting Championships =

International weightlifting competition

1906 Men's World Championships
- Host city: Lille, France
- Dates: March 18, 1906

The 1906 Men's World Weightlifting Championships were held in Lille, France, on March 18, 1906. There were 33 men in action from 4 nations. It was the 9th World Weightlifting Championships.

== Medal summary ==
Event	Gold	Silver	Bronze
Featherweight; 60 kg	Daniel de Lapalud; Switzerland	Joseph Staen; France	Charles Cellier; France
Lightweight; 70 kg	Georges Lorthiois; France	Pierre Slosse; France	Arthur Fessler; Switzerland
Middleweight; 80 kg	Albert Deroubaix; France	Louis Vasseur; France	Gustave Lacroix; France
Heavyweight +80 kg	Heinrich Schneidereit; Germany	Émile Besson; Switzerland	Gustave Falleur; France

== Medal table ==
Rank	Nation	Gold	Silver	Bronze	Total
1	France	2	3	3	8
2	Switzerland	1	1	1	3
3	Germany	1	0	0	1
Totals (3 entries)		4	4	4	12
