= 1907 World Weightlifting Championships =

International weightlifting competition

1907 Men's World Championships
- Host city: Frankfurt, Germany
- Dates: May 19, 1907

The 1907 Men's World Weightlifting Championships were held in Frankfurt, Germany on May 19, 1907. There were 23 men in action from 3 nations. It was the 10th World Weightlifting Championships.

== Medal summary ==
Event	Gold	Silver	Bronze
Lightweight; 70 kg	Johannes Zebrowsky; Germany	Virgile Guerraz; Switzerland	Heinrich Glenzer; Germany
Middleweight; 80 kg	Andreas Lutz; Germany	Johann Formberger; Germany	Hans Abraham; Germany
Heavyweight +80 kg	Heinrich Rondi; Germany	Heinrich Schneidereit; Germany	Georg Schleidt; Germany

== Medal table ==
Rank	Nation	Gold	Silver	Bronze	Total
1	Germany	3	2	3	8
2	Switzerland	0	1	0	1
Totals (2 entries)		3	3	3	9
