= 1950 World Weightlifting Championships =

International weightlifting competition

1950 Men's World Championships

The 1950 Men's World Weightlifting Championships were held October 13–15, 1950, in Paris, France. 56 men from 17 nations participated.

== Medal summary ==
Event	Gold		Silver		Bronze	
Bantamweight; 56 kg	Mahmoud Namjoo; Iran	310.0 kg	Rafael Chimishkyan; Soviet Union	305.0 kg	Kamal Mahgoub; Egypt	297.5 kg
Featherweight; 60 kg	Mahmoud Fayad; Egypt	327.5 kg	Yevgeny Lopatin; Soviet Union	317.5 kg	Julian Creus; Great Britain	305.0 kg
Lightweight; 67.5 kg	Joe Pitman; United States	352.5 kg	Attia Hamouda; Egypt	350.0 kg	Vladimir Svetilko; Soviet Union	347.5 kg
Middleweight; 75 kg	Khadr El-Touni; Egypt	400.0 kg	Pete George; United States	390.0 kg	Vladimir Pushkarev; Soviet Union	385.0 kg
Light heavyweight 82.5 kg	Stanley Stanczyk; United States	420.0 kg	Arkady Vorobyov; Soviet Union	420.0 kg	Arabi Awadi; Egypt	382.5 kg
Heavyweight +82.5 kg	John Davis; United States	462.5 kg	Yakov Kutsenko; Soviet Union	422.5 kg	Joseph Barnett; Great Britain	400.0 kg

== Medal table ==
Rank	Nation	Gold	Silver	Bronze	Total
1	United States	3	1	0	4
2	Egypt	2	1	2	5
3	Iran	1	0	0	1
4	Soviet Union	0	4	2	6
5	Great Britain	0	0	2	2
Totals (5 entries)		6	6	6	18
