= 1961 World Weightlifting Championships =

International weightlifting competition

1961 Men's World Championships

The 1961 Men's World Weightlifting Championships were held in Vienna, Austria from September 20 to September 25, 1961. There were 120 men in action from 33 nations.

== Medal summary ==
Event	Gold		Silver		Bronze	
Bantamweight; 56 kg	Vladimir Stogov; Soviet Union	345.0 kg	Imre Földi; Hungary	345.0 kg	Yoshinobu Miyake; Japan	337.5 kg
Featherweight; 60 kg	Isaac Berger; United States	367.5 kg	Sebastiano Mannironi; Italy	357.5 kg	Shared silver	
Featherweight; 60 kg	Isaac Berger; United States	367.5 kg	Yevgeny Minayev; Soviet Union	357.5 kg	Shared silver	
Lightweight; 67.5 kg	Waldemar Baszanowski; Poland	402.5 kg	Sergey Lopatin; Soviet Union	400.0 kg	Marian Zieliński; Poland	395.0 kg
Middleweight; 75 kg	Aleksandr Kurynov; Soviet Union	435.0 kg	Győző Veres; Hungary	420.0 kg	Marcel Paterni; France	405.0 kg
Light heavyweight 82.5 kg	Rudolf Plyukfelder; Soviet Union	450.0 kg	Géza Tóth; Hungary	432.5 kg	Tommy Kono; United States	430.0 kg
Middle heavyweight 90 kg	Ireneusz Paliński; Poland	475.0 kg	Louis Martin; Great Britain	462.5 kg	Arkady Vorobyov; Soviet Union	457.5 kg
Heavyweight +90 kg	Yury Vlasov; Soviet Union	525.0 kg	Richard Zirk; United States	475.0 kg	Eino Mäkinen; Finland	462.5 kg

== Medal table ==
Rank	Nation	Gold	Silver	Bronze	Total
1	Soviet Union	4	2	1	7
2	Poland	2	0	1	3
3	United States	1	1	1	3
4	Hungary	0	3	0	3
5	Great Britain	0	1	0	1
5	Italy	0	1	0	1
7	Finland	0	0	1	1
7	France	0	0	1	1
7	Japan	0	0	1	1
Totals (9 entries)		7	8	6	21
