= 1911 World Weightlifting Championships =

International weightlifting competition

1911 Men's World Championships
- Host city: Stuttgart, Germany
- Dates: April 29–30, 1911

The following is the result of the World Weightlifting Championships tournaments in year 1911.

== Tournament 1 ==
The first tournament (15th World Weightlifting Championships) was held in Stuttgart, Germany from April 29 to April 30, 1911. There were 36 men in action from 3 nations.

Event	Gold	Silver	Bronze
Featherweight; 60 kg	Alfred Anschütz; Germany	Emil Kliment; Austria	Georg Vogel; Germany
Lightweight; 70 kg	Ulrich Blaser; Switzerland	Franz Komarek; Austria	Peter Reinmuth; Germany
Middleweight; 80 kg	Leopold Hennermüller; Austria	Eugen Ruhland; Germany	Andreas Lutz; Germany
Heavyweight +80 kg	Josef Grafl; Austria	Heinrich Rondi; Germany	Heinrich Schneidereit; Germany

== Tournament 2 ==
The second tournament (16th World Weightlifting Championships) was held in Berlin, Germany from May 13 to May 14, 1911. There were 27 men in action from 2 nations.

Event	Gold	Silver	Bronze
Featherweight; 60 kg	Emil Kliment; Austria	Jakob Vogt; Germany	Oswald Greth; Germany
Lightweight; 70 kg	Josef Schwabl; Austria	Albert Meyer; Germany	Paul Gnauk; Germany
Middleweight; 80 kg	Rudolf Oswald; Austria	Leopold Hennermüller; Austria	Peter Haase; Germany
Heavyweight +80 kg	Karl Swoboda; Austria	Berthold Tandler; Austria	Franz Buchholz; Germany

== Tournament 3 ==
The third tournament (17th World Weightlifting Championships) was held in Dresden, Germany on June 26, 1911. There were 21 men in action from 3 nations.

Event	Gold	Silver	Bronze
Featherweight; 60 kg	Rudolf Thamme; Germany	Oswald Greth; Germany	Georg Weißbeck; Germany
Lightweight; 70 kg	Albert Meyer; Germany	Nikolaus Winkler; Germany	Max Kempe; Germany
Middleweight; 80 kg	Hans Abraham; Germany	Beertye Berculon; Netherlands	August Stubner; Austria
Heavyweight +80 kg	Berthold Tandler; Austria	Anton Dorregeest; Netherlands	Hermann Gäßler; Germany

== Tournament 4 ==
The fourth tournament (18th World Weightlifting Championships) was held in Vienna, Austria-Hungary from June 29 to July 2, 1911. There were 32 men in action from 3 nations.

Event	Gold	Silver	Bronze
Featherweight; 60 kg	Emil Kliment; Austria	Gustav Kubu; Austria	Rudolf Meier; Austria
Lightweight; 70 kg	Franz Komarek; Austria	Josef Schwabl; Austria	Leopold Butzek; Austria
Middleweight; 80 kg	Leopold Hennermüller; Austria	Ulrich Blaser; Switzerland	August Stubner; Austria
Heavyweight +80 kg	Karl Swoboda; Austria	Josef Grafl; Austria	Berthold Tandler; Austria

== Medal table ==
Rank	Nation	Gold	Silver	Bronze	Total
1	Austria	11	7	5	23
2	Germany	4	6	11	21
3	Switzerland	1	1	0	2
4	Netherlands	0	2	0	2
Totals (4 entries)		16	16	16	48
