= Josef Steinbach =

Austrian weightlifter (1879–1937)

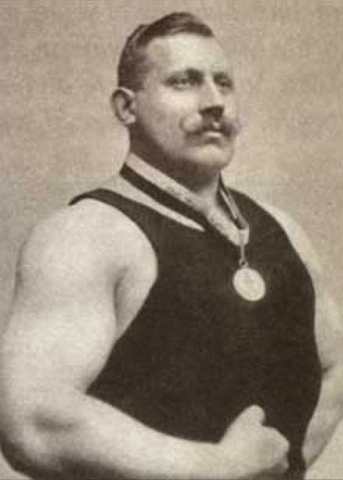

Personal information
- Born: 21 March 1879 Horschau, Bohemia, Austria-Hungary
- Died: 15 January 1937 (aged 57) Vienna, Austria
- Height: 177 cm (5 ft 10 in)
- Weight: 114 kg (251 lb)

Sport
- Sport: Weightlifting
- Club: I. Erdberger Athleten-Klub, Viena
Medal record
Representing Austrian Empire
Intercalated Games
Gold medal – first place	1906 Athens	Dumbbell
Silver medal – second place	1906 Athens	Barbell
World Championships
Gold medal – first place	1904 Vienna	Open weight
Gold medal – first place	1905 Berlin	+80 kg
Gold medal – first place	1905 Duisburg	Open weight

Josef Steinbach (21 March 1879 – 15 January 1937) was an Austrian weightlifter. He was born in Bohemia and in 1894 moved to Vienna, where he began competing in weightlifting in 1898. He won three world titles in 1904–1905 and two medals at the 1906 Intercalated Games: a gold in one-hand and a silver in two-hand lift. At the same competition, Steinbach also participated as a member of Austria's tug of war team, which did not medal, finishing in fourth place. After the Games he became professional wrestler and exhibition weightlifter. In 1910 he repeatedly challenged Arthur Saxon for the world professional weightlifting title, but to no avail.

Steinbach set several world records. In particular, his one-hand lift of 106 kg remained unbeaten until the 1930s. In 1924 he appeared in the silent film The City Without Jews.

Steinbach died in 1937 and was survived by son Leopold. The same year a large granite monument was built in his honor, sponsored by a group of Austrian and German weightlifters and wrestlers.
