= Trofim Lomakin =

Russian weightlifter (1924–1973)

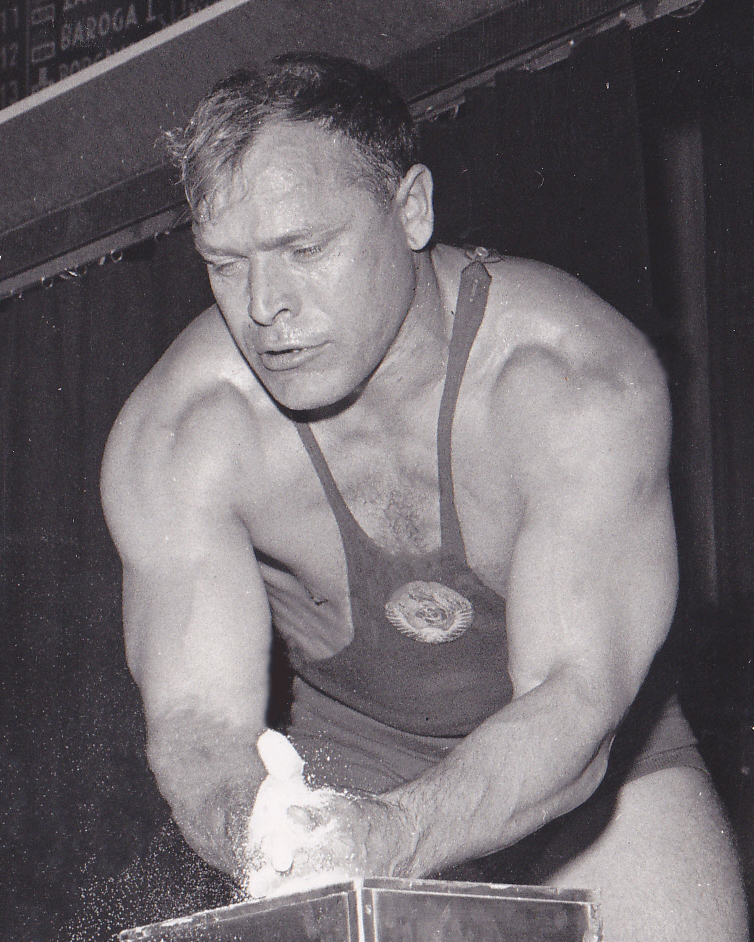
- Trofim Lomakin at the 1960 Olympics

Personal information
- Born: 2 August 1924 Barancha, Altai Governorate, Russian SFSR, Soviet Union
- Died: 13 June 1973 (aged 48)
- Height: 1.67 m (5 ft 6 in)
- Weight: 82–89 kg (181–196 lb)

Sport
- Sport: Weightlifting
- Club: Soviet Army, Moscow
Medal record
Representing the Soviet Union
Olympic Games
| Gold medal – first place | 1952 Helsinki | -82.5 kg |
| Silver medal – second place | 1960 Rome | -90 kg |
World Weightlifting Championships
| Silver medal – second place | 1953 Stockholm | -82.5 kg |
| Silver medal – second place | 1954 Vienna | -82.5 kg |
| Gold medal – first place | 1957 Tehran | -82.5 kg |
| Gold medal – first place | 1958 Stockholm | -82.5 kg |

Trofim Fyodorovich Lomakin (Russian: Трофим Фёдорович Ломакин, 2 August 1924 – 13 June 1973) was a Russian weightlifter who competed for the Soviet Union. He won a gold medal at the 1952 Summer Olympics and a silver medal at the 1960 Summer Olympics. He also won two world titles (1957 and 1958) and set five official and five unofficial world records (1953–1960), two in the press, five in the clean and jerk, and three in the total.

== Life ==
Lomakin was born to a miner in a remote village in Siberia and started training in weightlifting aged 18, while serving in the Soviet Army in the Far East. In 1949 he moved to Leningrad and in 1952 won his first national and European titles and an Olympic gold medal. Despite his successes in the 1950s, he developed alcoholism and for this reason was excluded from the 1956 Olympic team and later dishonorably discharged from the Soviet Army. After retiring from competitions in 1960 he could not keep any job and got involved with criminals. In the late 1960s he was arrested while trying to smuggle gold out of the Soviet Union and convicted to five years in prison. He was released after three years, but soon after that fell from a 20-meter height and died. He was heavily drunk, and it was unclear whether this was an accident or a murder.
