= Marcel Paterni =

French weightlifter (1936–2019)

Personal information
- Born: September 22, 1936 Casablanca, Morocco
- Died: July 13, 2019 (aged 82)
- Height: 163 cm (5 ft 4 in)
- Weight: 75–82 kg (165–181 lb)

Sport
- Country: France
- Sport: Olympic weightlifting
- Event(s): Clean and press Clean and jerk Snatch
Medal record
World Weightlifting Championships
Bronze medal – third place	1958 Stockholm	-75kg
Bronze medal – third place	1961 Vienna	-75kg
European Weightlifting Championships
Silver medal – second place	1957 European Weightlifting Championships	-75kg
Silver medal – second place	1958 European Weightlifting Championships	-75kg
Bronze medal – third place	1960 European Weightlifting Championships	-82.5 kg
Bronze medal – third place	1961 European Weightlifting Championships	-82.5 kg
Bronze medal – third place	1964 European Weightlifting Championships	-82.5 kg

Marcel Paterni (September 22, 1936 – July 13, 2019) was a French weightlifter of the 1950s and 1960s, who was dubbed "the French strongman of the Gaullian era" by European expert in heavy athletics Emmanuel Legeard.

== Early life ==
Of Corsican descent, Paterni was born in Casablanca, Morocco, on September 22, 1936. He was introduced to weightlifting by his older brother and started training in Casablanca at 16 years of age. In 1954, he was drafted into the French Army and stationed in Algeria during the Algerian War. In 1956, he moved to Paris, France.

== Career ==
Paterni competed at the 1956 Summer Olympics, 1960 Summer Olympics, and 1964 Summer Olympics. As a light-heavyweight (182 lb or 82.5 kg), Paterni set the World record at 150.5 kg in the Olympic press the 25 July 1959 in Massiac, France. In 1965, he retired from competition and turned to coaching. He eventually became head coach of the French Olympic weightlifting team in the mid-eighties. During his early coaching career in the 1960s Marcel Paterni pioneered a number of revolutionary methods and techniques of conditioning, like high-altitude training or 3-dimensional strength platform training.
