= Jakob Vogt =

German weightlifter

Personal information
- Born: 4 September 1902; Ochtendung, Germany
- Died: 1 January 1985 (aged 82); Mayen

Sport
- Country: Germany
- Sport: Weightlifting
- Weight class: Light-Heavyweight
- Club: AC Siegfried Ochtendung
- Updated on 12 December 2016

Jakob Vogt (4 September 1902 – 1 January 1985) was a German male weightlifter, who competed in the Light-Heavyweight category and represented Germany at international competitions. He won the silver medal at the 1911 World Weightlifting Championships and the gold medal at the 1924 European Championships in the middleweight class. He competed at the 1928 Summer Olympics. During his career he set a total of eleven world records in the light-heavyweight category between 1926 and 1932; five in the press, one in the snatch, and five in the total.
