= Ivan Veselinov =

Bulgarian weightlifter (1926–1996)

Personal information
- Full name: Ivan Todorov Veselinov
- Nationality: Bulgarian
- Born: 16 November 1926
- Died: 1996 (aged 69–70)

Sport
- Sport: Weightlifting

Ivan Veselinov (Bulgarian: Иван Веселинов, 16 November 1926 – 1996) was a Bulgarian weightlifter. He competed at the 1956 Summer Olympics, the 1960 Summer Olympics and the 1964 Summer Olympics.
