= Said Khalifa Gouda =

Egyptian weightlifter

Personal information
- Born: 16 April 1930
- Died: December 2014 (aged 84)

Sport
- Country: Egypt
- Sport: Weightlifting
- Weight class: 60 kg - 67.5 kg
- Team: National team
Medal record
Men's Weightlifting
Representing Egypt
World Championships
Gold medal – first place	1951 Milan	60 kg
Silver medal – second place	1954 Viena	67.5 kg
Silver medal – second place	1955 Munich	67.5 kg
Bronze medal – third place	1953 Stockholm	67.5 kg
- Updated on 6 October 2016

Said Khalifa Gouda (16 April 1930 – December 2014) was an Egyptian weightlifter who competed in the featherweight and lightweight class and represented Egypt at international competitions. He won the gold medal at the 1951 World Weightlifting Championships in the 60 kg category. He also competed in the men's featherweight event at the 1952 Summer Olympics.
