= Dmitry Ivanov (weightlifter) =

Russian weightlifter (1928–1993)

Personal information
- Born: 1928
- Died: 1993 (aged 65 – 66)

Sport
- Sport: Weightlifting
Medal record
Representing the Soviet Union
World Weightlifting Championships
| Silver medal – second place | 1953 Stockholm | Lightweight |
| Gold medal – first place | 1954 Vienna | Lightweight |
European Weightlifting Championships
| Gold medal – first place | 1953 Stockholm | Lightweight |
| Gold medal – first place | 1954 Vienna | Lightweight |

Dmitri Ivanovich Ivanov (Russian: Дмитрий Иванович Иванов, 1928 – 1993) was a Russian lightweight weightlifter. Between 1953 and 1954 he won one world and two European titles, and set four ratified world records: three in the press and one in the snatch.
