= Wilhelm Türk =

Wilhelm Türk (2 April 1871 – 20 May 1916) was an Austrian haematologist and professor of medicine at the University of Vienna. He coined the term "lymphatic reaction" and the Türk cell is named for him.
