= 1905 World Weightlifting Championships =

International weightlifting competition

1905 World Championships
- Host city: Various cities in various countries
- Dates: various dates in 1905

The following is the result of the World Weightlifting Championships tournaments in year 1905.

== Tournament 1 ==
The first tournament (6th World Weightlifting Championships) was held in Berlin, Germany from April 8 to April 10, 1905. There were 41 men in action from 4 nations.

Event	Gold	Silver	Bronze
Lightweight; 67.5 kg	Nikolaus Winkler; Germany	Albert Hansen; Germany	Paul Grimm; Germany
Middleweight; 80 kg	Otto Walther; Germany	Josef Lindinger; Germany	Edmund Danzer; Austria
Heavyweight +80 kg	Josef Steinbach; Austria	Karl Witzelsberger; Austria	Franz Pitka; Austria

== Tournament 2 ==
The second tournament (7th World Weightlifting Championships) was held in Duisburg, Germany from June 11 to June 13, 1905. There were 7 men in action from 2 nations.

Event	Gold	Silver	Bronze
Openweight	Josef Steinbach; Austria	Heinrich Neuhaus; Germany	Alois Selos; Germany

== Tournament 3 ==
The third tournament (8th World Weightlifting Championships) was held in Paris, France from December 16 to December 30, 1905. There were 16 men in action all from France.

Event	Gold	Silver	Bronze
Lightweight; 67.5 kg	Pierre Buisson; France	Charles Liébault; France	Marcel Bouteiller; France
Lightweight; 67.5 kg	Pierre Buisson; France	Charles Liébault; France	Robert Fredon; France
Middleweight; 80 kg	André Dufour; France	Miche Blayac; France	Roger Morbu; France
Heavyweight +80 kg	Émile Schweitzer; France	Jean-Pierre Péchaud; France	Gustave Laqueille; France

== Medal table ==
Rank	Nation	Gold	Silver	Bronze	Total
1	France	3	3	4	10
2	Germany	2	3	2	7
3	Austria	2	1	2	5
Totals (3 entries)		7	7	8	22
