= Yevgeny Katsura =

Soviet weightlifter (1937–1967)

Personal information
- Born: 09.03.1937 Kazan, Russia
- Died: 08.03.1967 (aged 30) Moscow, Russia

Sport
- Sport: Weightlifting
Medal record
Representing the Soviet Union
World Weightlifting Championships
Silver medal – second place	1962 Budapest	-60 kg
Gold medal – first place	1966 East Berlin	-67.5 kg
European Weightlifting Championships
Silver medal – second place	1962 Budapest	-60 kg
Gold medal – first place	1964 Moscow	-60 kg
Gold medal – first place	1966 East Berlin	-67.5 kg

Yevgeny Katsura (Russian: Евгений Кацура, 1937 – 1967) was a Russian weightlifter. Between 1962 and 1966 he won one world and two European titles, twice finishing in second place; he also set nine world records: seven in the press and two in the total.
