= Vladimir Svetilko =

Russian weightlifter

Personal information
- Born: 28 September 1915 Tambov, Russia

Sport
- Sport: Weightlifting
- Club: Dynamo
Medal record
Representing the Soviet Union
World Weightlifting Championships
Silver medal – second place	1946 Paris	Lightweight
Bronze medal – third place	1950 Paris	Lightweight
European Weightlifting Championships
Gold medal – first place	1950 Paris	Lightweight

Vladimir Kirillovich Svetilko (Russian: Владимир Кириллович Светилко, 28 September 1915 – ?) was a Russian lightweight weightlifter. In 1950 he won a European title, set a world record in the press, and won a bronze medal at the world championship. He was the Soviet lightweight champion between 1948 and 1951.
