= Aleksandr Kurynov =

Russian weightlifter (1934–1973)

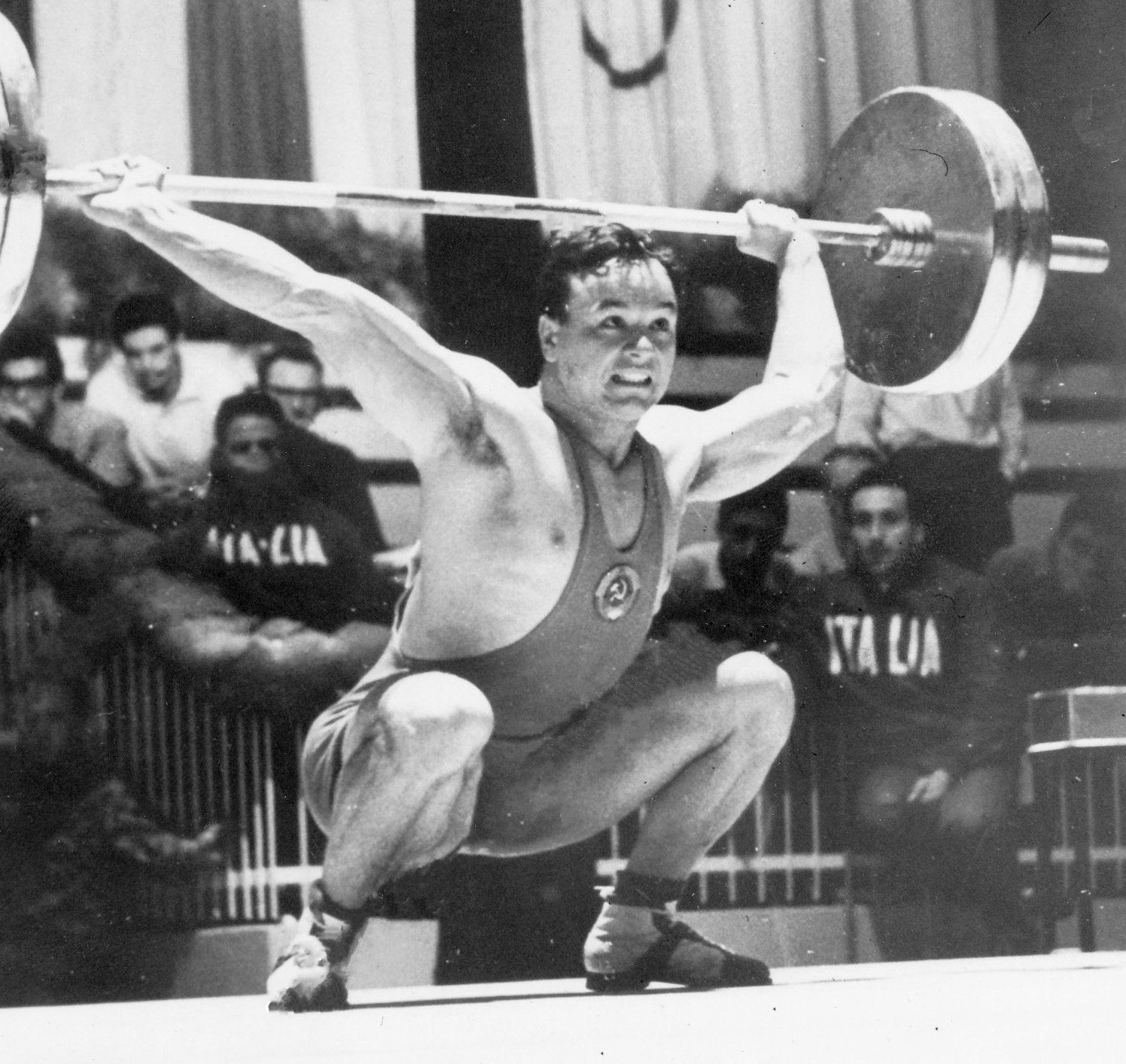
- Aleksandr Kurynov at the 1960 Olympics

Personal information
- Born: Aleksandr Pavlovich Kurynov; 8 July 1934 Urshelsky, Vladimir Oblast, Russian SFSR, Soviet Union
- Died: 30 November 1973 (aged 39) Kazan, Russian SFSR, Soviet Union
- Height: 1.65 m (5 ft 5 in)
- Weight: 75 kg (165 lb)

Sport
- Sport: Weightlifting
- Club: Burevestnik Kazan
Medal record
Representing the Soviet Union
Olympic Games
Gold medal – first place	1960 Rome	-75 kg
World Weightlifting Championships
Gold medal – first place	1961 Austria	-75 kg
Gold medal – first place	1962 Budapest	-75 kg
Gold medal – first place	1963 Stockholm	-75 kg
Bronze medal – third place	1965 Tehran	-75 kg

Aleksandr Pavlovich Kurynov (Russian: Александр Павлович Курынов, 8 July 1934 – 30 November 1973) was a Soviet and Russian weightlifter. He won a gold medal at the 1960 Summer Olympics and three world titles in 1961–1963. He also set 15 world records between 1958 and 1964: two in the press, four in the snatch, four in the clean and jerk, and five in the total.

Kurynov started training in weightlifting in 1954 while studying at the Kazan Aviation Institute. In 1958 and 1959 he finished second at the national championships and was included to the national team. Between 1958 and 1967 Kurynov won only one national title, in 1960, yet he excelled internationally in the 1960s, winning four consecutive European championships in 1960–1964, three consecutive world titles in 1961–1963 and an Olympic gold in 1960. He had a good chance for an Olympic medal in 1964, but was expelled from the Olympic team by the head coach Arkady Vorobyov, who did not approve of Kurynov's training methods.

Kurynov retired shortly after finishing third at the 1967 national championships, and then briefly worked as a weightlifting coach. Earlier in 1963 he graduated from the Kazan Aviation Institute, and after 1971 worked as an engineer with the Kazan Research Institute of Computer Science. He suddenly died of a kidney failure in 1973, aged 39, and was buried in Arskoe Cemetery. Since 1974 a memorial tournament is being held in Kazan in his honor.
