= Mihály Huszka =

Hungarian weightlifter (1933–2022)

Personal information
- Nationality: Hungarian
- Born: 2 June 1933; Csongrád, Hungary
- Died: 9 December 2022 (aged 89)

Sport
- Sport: Weightlifting

Mihály Huszka (2 June 1933 – 9 December 2022) was a Hungarian weightlifter. He competed at the 1960 Summer Olympics and the 1964 Summer Olympics.

Huszka won the national and world masters powerlifting titles, and later served as a mentor and weight trainer for discus thrower Adam Setliff.

Huszka died on 9 December 2022, at the age of 89.
