= Franz Hölbl =

Austrian weightlifter

Personal information
- Nationality: Austrian
- Born: 27 December 1927
- Died: 1976 (aged 48–49)

Sport
- Sport: Weightlifting

Franz Hölbl (27 December 1927 – 1976) was an Austrian weightlifter. He competed at the 1952 Summer Olympics and the 1956 Summer Olympics.
