= 1920 World Weightlifting Championships =

International weightlifting competition

1920 Men's World Championships
- Host city: Vienna, Austria
- Dates: September 4–8, 1920

The 1920 Men's World Weightlifting Championships were held in Vienna, Austria from September 4 to September 8, 1920. There were 74 men in action from 4 nations.

== Medal summary ==
Event	Gold	Silver	Bronze
Featherweight; 60 kg	Eugen Wiedmann; Germany	Andreas Jaquemont; Germany	Gustav Kubu; Austria
Lightweight; 67.5 kg	Philipp List; Germany	Josef Zimmermann; Germany	Karl Palkowitz; Austria
Middleweight; 75 kg	Karl Stritesky; Austria	Ulrich Blaser; Switzerland	Josef Kammerer; Austria
Light heavyweight 82.5 kg	Josef Straßberger; Germany	Franz Zuba; Austria	Leopold Hennermüller; Austria
Heavyweight +82.5 kg	Karl Mörke; Germany	Franz Aigner; Austria	Heinrich Alscher; Austria

== Medal table ==
Rank	Nation	Gold	Silver	Bronze	Total
1	Germany	4	2	0	6
2	Austria	1	2	5	8
3	Switzerland	0	1	0	1
Totals (3 entries)		5	5	5	15
