= Rudolf Kozłowski =

Polish weightlifter

Personal information
- Nationality: Polish
- Born: 15 July 1935 (age 89); Zabrze, Poland

Sport
- Sport: Weightlifting

Rudolf Kozłowski (born 15 July 1935) is a Polish weightlifter. He competed in the men's featherweight event at the 1964 Summer Olympics.
