= Jean Debuf =

French weightlifter (1924–2010)

Olympic medal record

Representing France

Men's Weightlifting

Olympic Games
Bronze medal – third place	1956 Melbourne	Middle-heavyweight

Jean Debuf (31 May 1924 – 6 October 2010) was a French weightlifter.

He was born in Bousbecque. He won a bronze medal in the middle heavyweight division at the 1956 Summer Olympics in Melbourne. At the 1948 Summer Olympics he placed fourth in the light heavyweight division, and at the 1952 Summer Olympics he placed fifth.
