= Vladimir Stogov =

Russian weightlifter (1930–2005)

Personal information
- Born: November 5, 1930
- Died: May 17, 2005 (aged 74)
Medal record
Men's weightlifting
Representing the Soviet Union
Olympic Games
Silver medal – second place	1956 Melbourne	-56 kg
World Championships
Gold medal – first place	1955 Munich	-56 kg
Gold medal – first place	1957 Teheran	-56 kg
Gold medal – first place	1958 Stockholm	-56 kg
Gold medal – first place	1959 Warsaw	-56 kg
Gold medal – first place	1961 Vienna	-56 kg
Bronze medal – third place	1962 Budapest	-56 kg
European Championships
Gold medal – first place	1956 Helsinki	-56 kg
Gold medal – first place	1960 Milan	-56 kg

Vladimir Stepanovich Stogov (Russian: Владимир Степанович Стогов; November 5, 1930 – May 17, 2005) was a former Russian weightlifter, World champion, and Olympic medalist, who competed for the Soviet Union.

He became World champion in the Bantamweight class five times, in 1955, 1957, 1958, 1959, and 1961, and received a silver medal at the 1956 Summer Olympics in Melbourne.
