= Mohamed Ibrahim Saleh =

Egyptian weightlifter (1917–1981)

Personal information
- Nationality: Egyptian
- Born: 1917 Cairo, Egypt
- Died: 2 September 1981 (aged 63–64)

Sport
- Sport: Weightlifting

Mohamed Ibrahim Saleh (1917 – 2 September 1981) was an Egyptian weightlifter. He competed at the 1948 Summer Olympics and the 1952 Summer Olympics. Saleh died on 2 September 1981.
