= John Davis (weightlifter) =

American weightlifter (1921–1984)

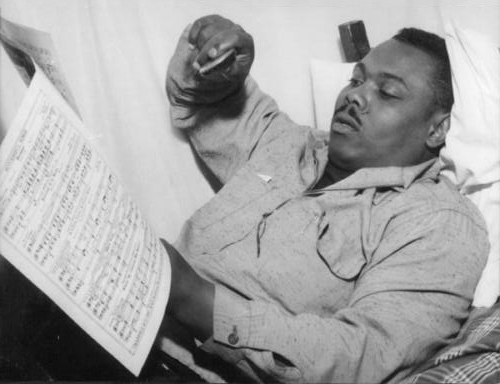

Personal information
- Full name: John Henry Davis
- Born: January 12, 1921 Smithtown, New York, U.S.
- Died: July 13, 1984 (aged 63) Albuquerque, New Mexico, U.S.

Sport
- Sport: Weightlifting
- Club: York Barbell Club
Medal record
Representing the United States
Olympic Games
Gold medal – first place	1948 London	+82.5 kg
Gold medal – first place	1952 Helsinki	+90 kg
World Weightlifting Championships
Gold medal – first place	1938 Vienna	82.5 kg
Gold medal – first place	1946 Paris	+82.5 kg
Gold medal – first place	1947 Philadelphia	+82.5 kg
Gold medal – first place	1949 Scheveningen	+82.5 kg
Gold medal – first place	1950 Paris	+90 kg
Gold medal – first place	1951 Milan	+90 kg
Silver medal – second place	1953 Stockholm	+90 kg
Pan American Games
Gold medal – first place	1951 Buenos Aires	+90 kg

John Henry Davis (January 12, 1921 – July 13, 1984) was an American heavyweight weightlifter. Between 1938 and 1953 he was undefeated, winning two Olympic, six world and 12 national titles, and set 16 ratified world records: seven in the snatch, four in the clean and jerk, two in the press and three in the total.

== Biography ==
A native of Brooklyn, New York, Davis enlisted in 1941 and served in the U.S. Army for many years during World War II at the Pacific Theater, being able to return stateside in 1942 and 1943 to partake in championships but having to forgo in 1944 and 1945. For most of his 19-year weightlifting career he represented the York Barbell Club. He worked as an officer in the New York Department of Corrections.

Davis first gained prominence by winning the world light heavyweight crown as a 17-year-old school boy in 1938 at Vienna, Austria. He remained unbeaten until 1953, when he finished second at the world championships due to a thigh injury. At his peak, Davis held all the world records in his class, and at the 1951 national championships he became the first man to break the 400 pound barrier by lifting 402 pounds. He retired in 1956 after a devastating leg injury at the '56 Olympic trials.

John Davis died from cancer in 1984, in Albuquerque, New Mexico. He was 63 years old. He was inducted to the United States Olympic Hall of Fame in 1989.
