= Dave Sheppard =

American weightlifter (1931–2000)

Personal information
- Nationality: American
- Born: December 12, 1931 New York City
- Died: November 5, 2000 (aged 68)

Sport
- Sport: Weightlifting
Medal record
Men's weightlifting
Representing the United States
Olympic Games
Silver medal – second place	1956 Melbourne	Middle heavyweight

David Joseph Sheppard (December 12, 1931 in New York City – November 5, 2000) was an American weightlifter and Olympic medalist.

He received a silver medal at the 1956 Summer Olympics in Melbourne. He was also a four-time runner-up at the Senior World Championship, losing the 1951 title to Pete George on countback.

== Weightlifting achievements ==
- Silver medalist in Olympic Games (1956).
- Silver medalist in Senior World Championship (1951, 1953, 1954, and 1958).
- Pan Am Games champion (1955).
- Senior national champion (1954, 1955, and 1958).
- Set five world records during career.
