= Heinrich Schneidereit =

German weightlifter (1884–1915)

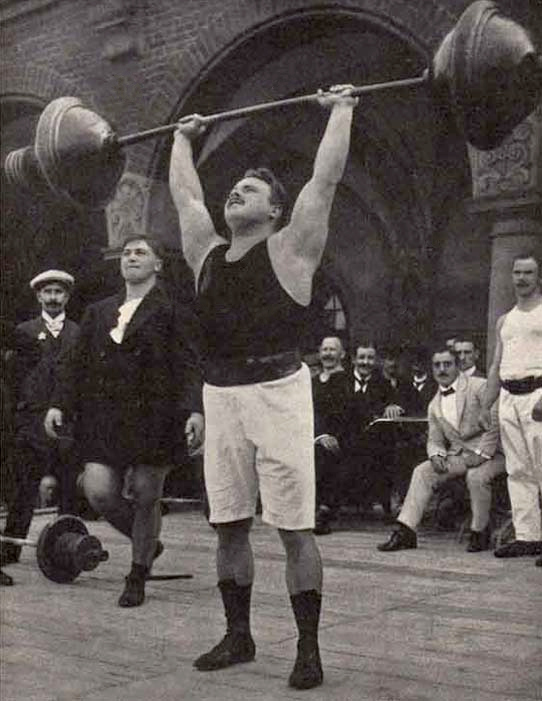
Schneidereit in 1912

Heinrich Schneidereit (23 December 1884 – 30 September 1915) was a German heavyweight weightlifter who competed at the 1906 Intercalated Games. He won a gold medal in the tug of war and bronze medals in the one hand lift and two hand lift.

Schneidereit joined a weightlifting club when he was aged 16, but owing to his athletic background soon became one of the best German competitors and won four medals at the world weightlifting championships of 1903–1911. In 1914, he won his last competition and was studying business administration. The following year, he was killed in France during World War I.

== See also ==
- List of Olympians killed in World War I
