= List of Olympic medalists in weightlifting =

This is the complete list of Olympic medalists in weightlifting.

== Current program ==
=== Men ===
==== Featherweight ====
- –60 kg (1920–1936)
- 56–60 kg (1948–1992)
- 59–64 kg (1996)
- 56–62 kg (2000–2016)
- 61–67 kg (2020)
- -61 kg (2024)

Games	Gold	Silver	Bronze
1920 Antwerp	Frans De Haes; Belgium	Alfred Schmidt; Estonia	Eugène Ryter; Switzerland
1924 Paris	Pierino Gabetti; Italy	Andreas Stadler; Austria	Arthur Reinmann; Switzerland
1928 Amsterdam	Franz Andrysek; Austria	Pierino Gabetti; Italy	Hans Wölpert; Germany
1932 Los Angeles	Raymond Suvigny; France	Hans Wölpert; Germany	Anthony Terlazzo; United States
1936 Berlin	Anthony Terlazzo; United States	Saleh Soliman; Egypt	Ibrahim Shams; Egypt
1948 London	Mahmoud Fayad; Egypt	Rodney Wilkes; Trinidad and Tobago	Jafar Salmasi; Iran
1952 Helsinki	Rafael Chimishkyan; Soviet Union	Nikolay Saksonov; Soviet Union	Rodney Wilkes; Trinidad and Tobago
1956 Melbourne	Isaac Berger; United States	Yevgeni Minaev; Soviet Union	Marian Zieliński; Poland
1960 Rome	Yevgeny Minayev; Soviet Union	Isaac Berger; United States	Sebastiano Mannironi; Italy
1964 Tokyo	Yoshinobu Miyake; Japan	Isaac Berger; United States	Mieczysław Nowak; Poland
1968 Mexico City	Yoshinobu Miyake; Japan	Dito Shanidze; Soviet Union	Yoshiyuki Miyake; Japan
1972 Munich	Norair Nurikyan; Bulgaria	Dito Shanidze; Soviet Union	János Benedek; Hungary
1976 Montreal	Nikolay Kolesnikov; Soviet Union	Georgi Todorov; Bulgaria	Kazumasa Hirai; Japan
1980 Moscow	Viktor Mazin; Soviet Union	Stefan Dimitrov; Bulgaria	Marek Seweryn; Poland
1984 Los Angeles	Chen Weiqiang; China	Gelu Radu; Romania	Tsai Wen-Yee; Chinese Taipei
1988 Seoul	Naim Süleymanoğlu; Turkey	Stefan Topurov; Bulgaria	Ye Huanming; China
1992 Barcelona	Naim Süleymanoğlu; Turkey	Nikolay Peshalov; Bulgaria	He Yingqiang; China
1996 Atlanta	Naim Süleymanoğlu; Turkey	Valerios Leonidis; Greece	Xiao Jiangang; China
2000 Sydney	Nikolaj Pešalov; Croatia	Leonidas Sabanis; Greece	Gennady Oleshchuk; Belarus
2004 Athens	Shi Zhiyong; China	Le Maosheng; China	Israel José Rubio; Venezuela
2008 Beijing	Zhang Xiangxiang; China	Diego Salazar; Colombia	Triyatno; Indonesia
2012 London	Kim Un-guk; North Korea	Óscar Figueroa; Colombia	Eko Yuli Irawan; Indonesia
2016 Rio de Janeiro	Óscar Figueroa; Colombia	Eko Yuli Irawan; Indonesia	Farkhad Kharki; Kazakhstan
2020 Tokyo	Chen Lijun; China	Luis Javier Mosquera; Colombia	Mirko Zanni; Italy
2024 Paris	Li Fabin; China	Theerapong Silachai; Thailand	Hampton Morris; United States

==== Lightweight ====
- 60–67.5 kg (1920–1992)
- 64–70 kg (1996)
- 62–69 kg (2000–2016)
- 67–73 kg (2020)
- 61–73 kg (2024-)

Games	Gold	Silver	Bronze
1920 Antwerp	Alfred Neuland; Estonia	Louis Williquet; Belgium	Florimond Rooms; Belgium
1924 Paris	Edmond Decottignies; France	Anton Zwerina; Austria	Bohumil Durdis; Czechoslovakia
1928 Amsterdam	Hans Haas; Austria	None awarded	Fernand Arnout; France
1928 Amsterdam	Kurt Helbig; Germany	None awarded	Fernand Arnout; France
1932 Los Angeles	René Duverger; France	Hans Haas; Austria	Gastone Pierini; Italy
1936 Berlin	Robert Fein; Austria	None awarded	Karl Jansen; Germany
1936 Berlin	Anwar Mesbah; Egypt	None awarded	Karl Jansen; Germany
1948 London	Ibrahim Shams; Egypt	Attia Hamouda; Egypt	James Halliday; Great Britain
1952 Helsinki	Tommy Kono; United States	Yevgeny Lopatin; Soviet Union	Vern Barberis; Australia
1956 Melbourne	Ihor Rybak; Soviet Union	Ravil Khabutdinov; Soviet Union	Kim Chang-hee; South Korea
1960 Rome	Viktor Bushuev; Soviet Union	Tan Howe Liang; Singapore	Abdul-Wahid Aziz; Iraq
1964 Tokyo	Waldemar Baszanowski; Poland	Vladimir Kaplunov; Soviet Union	Marian Zieliński; Poland
1968 Mexico City	Waldemar Baszanowski; Poland	Parviz Jalayer; Iran	Marian Zieliński; Poland
1972 Munich	Mukharby Kirzhinov; Soviet Union	Mladen Kuchev; Bulgaria	Zbigniew Kaczmarek; Poland
1976 Montreal	Petro Korol; Soviet Union	Daniel Senet; France	Kazimierz Czarnecki; Poland
1980 Moscow	Yanko Rusev; Bulgaria	Joachim Kunz; East Germany	Mincho Pashov; Bulgaria
1984 Los Angeles	Yao Jingyuan; China	Andrei Socaci; Romania	Jouni Grönman; Finland
1988 Seoul	Joachim Kunz; East Germany	Israel Militosyan; Soviet Union	Li Jinhe; China
1992 Barcelona	Israel Militosyan; Unified Team	Yoto Yotov; Bulgaria	Andreas Behm; Germany
1996 Atlanta	Zhan Xugang; China	Kim Myong-Nam; North Korea	Attila Feri; Hungary
2000 Sydney	Galabin Boevski; Bulgaria	Georgi Markov; Bulgaria	Siarhei Laurenau; Belarus
2004 Athens	Zhang Guozheng; China	Lee Bae-young; South Korea	Nikolaj Pešalov; Croatia
2008 Beijing	Liao Hui; China	Vencelas Dabaya; France	Yordanis Borrero; Cuba
2012 London	Lin Qingfeng; China	Triyatno; Indonesia	Kim Myong-hyok; North Korea
2016 Rio de Janeiro	Shi Zhiyong; China	Daniyar Ismayilov; Turkey	Luis Javier Mosquera; Colombia
2020 Tokyo	Shi Zhiyong; China	Julio Mayora; Venezuela	Rahmat Erwin Abdullah; Indonesia
2024 Paris	Rizki Juniansyah; Indonesia	Weeraphon Wichuma; Thailand	Bozhidar Andreev; Bulgaria

==== Middleweight ====
- 67.5–75 kg (1920–1992)
- 70–76 kg (1996)
- 69–77 kg (2000–2016)
- 73–81 kg (2020)
- 73–89 kg (2024–)

Games	Gold	Silver	Bronze
1920 Antwerp	Henri Gance; France	Pietro Bianchi; Italy	Albert Pettersson; Sweden
1924 Paris	Carlo Galimberti; Italy	Alfred Neuland; Estonia	Jaan Kikkas; Estonia
1928 Amsterdam	Roger François; France	Carlo Galimberti; Italy	Guus Scheffer; Netherlands
1932 Los Angeles	Rudolf Ismayr; Germany	Carlo Galimberti; Italy	Karl Hipfinger; Austria
1936 Berlin	Khadr El-Touni; Egypt	Rudolf Ismayr; Germany	Adolf Wagner; Germany
1948 London	Frank Spellman; United States	Pete George; United States	Kim Seong-jip; South Korea
1952 Helsinki	Pete George; United States	Gerry Gratton; Canada	Kim Seong-jip; South Korea
1956 Melbourne	Fyodor Bogdanovsky; Soviet Union	Pete George; United States	Ermanno Pignatti; Italy
1960 Rome	Aleksandr Kurynov; Soviet Union	Tommy Kono; United States	Győző Veres; Hungary
1964 Tokyo	Hans Zdražila; Czechoslovakia	Viktor Kurentsov; Soviet Union	Masushi Ouchi; Japan
1968 Mexico City	Viktor Kurentsov; Soviet Union	Masushi Ouchi; Japan	Károly Bakos; Hungary
1972 Munich	Yordan Bikov; Bulgaria	Mohamed Tarabulsi; Lebanon	Anselmo Silvino; Italy
1976 Montreal	Yordan Mitkov; Bulgaria	Vardan Militosyan; Soviet Union	Peter Wenzel; East Germany
1980 Moscow	Asen Zlatev; Bulgaria	Aleksandr Pervi; Soviet Union	Nedelcho Kolev; Bulgaria
1984 Los Angeles	Karl-Heinz Radschinsky; West Germany	Jacques Demers; Canada	Dragomir Cioroslan; Romania
1988 Seoul	Borislav Gidikov; Bulgaria	Ingo Steinhöfel; East Germany	Aleksandar Varbanov; Bulgaria
1992 Barcelona	Fedor Kassapu; Unified Team	Pablo Lara; Cuba	Kim Myong-Nam; North Korea
1996 Atlanta	Pablo Lara; Cuba	Yoto Yotov; Bulgaria	Jon Chol-ho; North Korea
2000 Sydney	Zhan Xugang; China	Viktor Mitrou; Greece	Arsen Melikyan; Armenia
2004 Athens	Taner Sağır; Turkey	Sergey Filimonov; Kazakhstan	Reyhan Arabacıoğlu; Turkey
2008 Beijing	Sa Jae-hyouk; South Korea	Li Hongli; China	Gevorg Davtyan; Armenia
2012 London	Lü Xiaojun; China	Lu Haojie; China	Iván Cambar; Cuba
2016 Rio de Janeiro	Lü Xiaojun; China	Mohamed Ihab; Egypt	Chatuphum Chinnawong; Thailand
2020 Tokyo	Lü Xiaojun; China	Zacarías Bonnat; Dominican Republic	Antonino Pizzolato; Italy
2024 Paris	Karlos Nasar; Bulgaria	Yeison López; Colombia	Antonino Pizzolato; Italy

==== Heavyweight ====
- +82.5 kg (1920–1948)
- +90 kg (1952–1968)
- 90–110 kg (1972–1976)
- 100–110 kg (1980–1992)
- 99–108 kg (1996)
- 94–105 kg (2000–2016)
- 96–109 kg (2020)
- 89–102 kg (2024–)

Games	Gold	Silver	Bronze
1920 Antwerp	Filippo Bottino; Italy	Joseph Alzin; Luxembourg	Louis Bernot; France
1924 Paris	Giuseppe Tonani; Italy	Franz Aigner; Austria	Harald Tammer; Estonia
1928 Amsterdam	Josef Straßberger; Germany	Arnold Luhaäär; Estonia	Jaroslav Skobla; Czechoslovakia
1932 Los Angeles	Jaroslav Skobla; Czechoslovakia	Václav Pšenička; Czechoslovakia	Josef Straßberger; Germany
1936 Berlin	Josef Manger; Germany	Václav Pšenička; Czechoslovakia	Arnold Luhaäär; Estonia
1948 London	John Davis; United States	Norbert Schemansky; United States	Abraham Charité; Netherlands
1952 Helsinki	John Davis; United States	James Bradford; United States	Humberto Selvetti; Argentina
1956 Melbourne	Paul Anderson; United States	Humberto Selvetti; Argentina	Alberto Pigaiani; Italy
1960 Rome	Yury Vlasov; Soviet Union	James Bradford; United States	Norbert Schemansky; United States
1964 Tokyo	Leonid Zhabotinsky; Soviet Union	Yury Vlasov; Soviet Union	Norbert Schemansky; United States
1968 Mexico City	Leonid Zhabotinsky; Soviet Union	Serge Reding; Belgium	Joseph Dube; United States
1972 Munich	Jaan Talts; Soviet Union	Aleksandar Kraychev; Bulgaria	Stefan Grützner; East Germany
1976 Montreal	Yury Zaitsev; Soviet Union	Krastyu Semerdzhiev; Bulgaria	Tadeusz Rutkowski; Poland
1980 Moscow	Leonid Taranenko; Soviet Union	Valentin Khristov; Bulgaria	György Szalai; Hungary
1984 Los Angeles	Norberto Oberburger; Italy	Stefan Tasnadi; Romania	Guy Carlton; United States
1988 Seoul	Yury Zakharevich; Soviet Union	József Jacsó; Hungary	Ronny Weller; East Germany
1992 Barcelona	Ronny Weller; Germany	Artur Akoyev; Unified Team	Stefan Botev; Bulgaria
1996 Atlanta	Timur Taymazov; Ukraine	Sergey Syrtsov; Russia	Nicu Vlad; Romania
2000 Sydney	Hossein Tavakkoli; Iran	Alan Tsagaev; Bulgaria	Said Saif Asaad; Qatar
2004 Athens	Dmitry Berestov; Russia	Ihor Razoronov; Ukraine	Gleb Pisarevskiy; Russia
2008 Beijing	Andrei Aramnau; Belarus	Dmitry Klokov; Russia	Marcin Dołęga; Poland
2012 London	Navab Nassirshalal; Iran	Bartłomiej Bonk; Poland	Ivan Efremov; Uzbekistan
2016 Rio de Janeiro	Ruslan Nurudinov; Uzbekistan	Simon Martirosyan; Armenia	Aleksandr Zaychikov; Kazakhstan
2020 Tokyo	Akbar Djuraev; Uzbekistan	Simon Martirosyan; Armenia	Artūrs Plēsnieks; Latvia
2024 Paris	Liu Huanhua; China	Akbar Djuraev; Uzbekistan	Yauheni Tsikhantsou; Individual Neutral Athletes

==== Super heavyweight ====
- +110 kg (1972–1992)
- +108 kg (1996)
- +105 kg (2000–2016)
- +109 kg (2020)
- +102 kg (2024–)

Games	Gold	Silver	Bronze
1972 Munich	Vasily Alekseyev; Soviet Union	Rudolf Mang; West Germany	Gerd Bonk; East Germany
1976 Montreal	Vasily Alekseyev; Soviet Union	Gerd Bonk; East Germany	Helmut Losch; East Germany
1980 Moscow	Sultan Rakhmanov; Soviet Union	Jürgen Heuser; East Germany	Tadeusz Rutkowski; Poland
1984 Los Angeles	Dean Lukin; Australia	Mario Martinez; United States	Manfred Nerlinger; West Germany
1988 Seoul	Aleksandr Kurlovich; Soviet Union	Manfred Nerlinger; West Germany	Martin Zawieja; West Germany
1992 Barcelona	Aleksandr Kurlovich; Unified Team	Leonid Taranenko; Unified Team	Manfred Nerlinger; Germany
1996 Atlanta	Andrei Chemerkin; Russia	Ronny Weller; Germany	Stefan Botev; Australia
2000 Sydney	Hossein Rezazadeh; Iran	Ronny Weller; Germany	Andrei Chemerkin; Russia
2004 Athens	Hossein Rezazadeh; Iran	Viktors Ščerbatihs; Latvia	Velichko Cholakov; Bulgaria
2008 Beijing	Matthias Steiner; Germany	Evgeny Chigishev; Russia	Viktors Ščerbatihs; Latvia
2012 London	Behdad Salimi; Iran	Sajjad Anoushiravani; Iran	Jeon Sang-guen; South Korea
2016 Rio de Janeiro	Lasha Talakhadze; Georgia	Gor Minasyan; Armenia	Irakli Turmanidze; Georgia
2020 Tokyo	Lasha Talakhadze; Georgia	Ali Davoudi; Iran	Man Asaad; Syria
2024 Paris	Lasha Talakhadze; Georgia	Varazdat Lalayan; Armenia	Gor Minasyan; Bahrain

=== Women ===
==== Flyweight ====
- 48 kg (2000–2016)
- 49 kg (2020–)

Games	Gold	Silver	Bronze
2000 Sydney	Tara Nott; United States	Raema Lisa Rumbewas; Indonesia	Sri Indriyani; Indonesia
2004 Athens	Nurcan Taylan; Turkey	Li Zhuo; China	Aree Wiratthaworn; Thailand
2008 Beijing	Chen Wei-ling; Chinese Taipei	Im Jyoung-hwa; South Korea	Pensiri Laosirikul; Thailand
2012 London	Wang Mingjuan; China	Hiromi Miyake; Japan	Ryang Chun-hwa; North Korea
2016 Rio de Janeiro	Sopita Tanasan; Thailand	Sri Wahyuni Agustiani; Indonesia	Hiromi Miyake; Japan
2020 Tokyo	Hou Zhihui; China	Saikhom Mirabai Chanu; India	Windy Cantika Aisah; Indonesia
2024 Paris	Hou Zhihui; China	Mihaela Cambei; Romania	Surodchana Khambao; Thailand

==== Lightweight ====
- 58 kg (2000–2016)
- 59 kg (2020–)

Games	Gold	Silver	Bronze
2000 Sydney	Soraya Jiménez; Mexico	Ri Song Hui; North Korea	Khassaraporn Suta; Thailand
2004 Athens	Chen Yanqing; China	Ri Song Hui; North Korea	Wandee Kameaim; Thailand
2008 Beijing	Chen Yanqing; China	O Jong Ae; North Korea	Wandee Kameaim; Thailand
2012 London	Li Xueying; China	Pimsiri Sirikaew; Thailand	Rattikan Gulnoi; Thailand
2016 Rio de Janeiro	Sukanya Srisurat; Thailand	Pimsiri Sirikaew; Thailand	Kuo Hsing-chun; Chinese Taipei
2020 Tokyo	Kuo Hsing-chun; Chinese Taipei	Polina Guryeva; Turkmenistan	Mikiko Ando; Japan
2024 Paris	Luo Shifang; China	Maude Charron; Canada	Kuo Hsing-chun; Chinese Taipei

==== Light heavyweight ====
- 69 kg (2000–2016)
- 76 kg (2020)
- 71 kg (2024–)

Games	Gold	Silver	Bronze
2000 Sydney	Lin Weining; China	Erzsébet Márkus; Hungary	Karnam Malleswari; India
2004 Athens	Liu Chunhong; China	Eszter Krutzler; Hungary	Zarema Kasaeva; Russia
2008 Beijing	Oksana Slivenko; Russia	Leydi Solís; Colombia	Abeer Abdelrahman; Egypt
2012 London	Rim Jong-sim; North Korea	Anna Nurmukhambetova; Kazakhstan	Ubaldina Valoyes; Colombia
2016 Rio de Janeiro	Xiang Yanmei; China	Zhazira Zhapparkul; Kazakhstan	Sara Ahmed; Egypt
2020 Tokyo	Neisi Dájomes; Ecuador	Katherine Nye; United States	Aremi Fuentes; Mexico
2024 Paris	Olivia Reeves; United States	Mari Sánchez; Colombia	Angie Palacios; Ecuador

==== Heavyweight ====
- 75 kg (2000–2016)
- 87 kg (2020)
- 81 kg (2024–)

Games	Gold	Silver	Bronze
2000 Sydney	María Isabel Urrutia; Colombia	Ruth Ogbeifo; Nigeria	Kuo Yi-hang; Chinese Taipei
2004 Athens	Pawina Thongsuk; Thailand	Natalya Zabolotnaya; Russia	Valentina Popova; Russia
2008 Beijing	Alla Vazhenina; Kazakhstan	Lydia Valentín; Spain	Damaris Aguirre; Mexico
2012 London	Lydia Valentín; Spain	Abeer Abdelrahman; Egypt	Madias Nzesso; Cameroon
2016 Rio de Janeiro	Rim Jong-sim; North Korea	Darya Naumava; Belarus	Lydia Valentín; Spain
2020 Tokyo	Wang Zhouyu; China	Tamara Salazar; Ecuador	Crismery Santana; Dominican Republic
2024 Paris	Solfrid Koanda; Norway	Sara Ahmed; Egypt	Neisi Dájomes; Ecuador

==== Super heavyweight ====
- +75 kg (2000–2016)
- +87 kg (2020)
- +81 kg (2024–)

Games	Gold	Silver	Bronze
2000 Sydney	Ding Meiyuan; China	Agata Wróbel; Poland	Cheryl Haworth; United States
2004 Athens	Tang Gonghong; China	Jang Mi-ran; South Korea	Agata Wróbel; Poland
2008 Beijing	Jang Mi-ran; South Korea	Ele Opeloge; Samoa	Mariam Usman; Nigeria
2012 London	Zhou Lulu; China	Tatiana Kashirina; Russia	Jang Mi-ran; South Korea
2016 Rio de Janeiro	Meng Suping; China	Kim Kuk-hyang; North Korea	Sarah Robles; United States
2020 Tokyo	Li Wenwen; China	Emily Campbell; Great Britain	Sarah Robles; United States
2024 Paris	Li Wenwen; China	Park Hye-jeong; South Korea	Emily Campbell; Great Britain

== Discontinued events ==
=== Men ===
==== One hand lift ====
Games	Gold	Silver	Bronze
1896 Athens	Launceston Elliot; Great Britain	Viggo Jensen; Denmark	Alexandros Nikolopoulos; Greece

==== Two hand lift ====
Games	Gold	Silver	Bronze
1896 Athens	Viggo Jensen; Denmark	Launceston Elliot; Great Britain	Sotirios Versis; Greece
1900 Paris	not included in the Olympic program		
1904 St. Louis	Perikles Kakousis; Greece	Oscar Osthoff; United States	Frank Kugler; United States

==== All-around dumbbell contest ====
Games	Gold	Silver	Bronze
1904 St. Louis	Oscar Osthoff; United States	Frederick Winters; United States	Frank Kugler; United States

==== Flyweight ====
- –52 kg (1972–1992)
- –54 kg (1996)

Games	Gold	Silver	Bronze
1972 Munich	Zygmunt Smalcerz; Poland	Lajos Szűcs; Hungary	Sándor Holczreiter; Hungary
1976 Montreal	Aleksandr Voronin; Soviet Union	György Kőszegi; Hungary	Mohammad Nassiri; Iran
1980 Moscow	Kanybek Osmonaliyev; Soviet Union	Ho Bong-chol; North Korea	Han Gyong-si; North Korea
1984 Los Angeles	Zeng Guoqiang; China	Zhou Peishun; China	Kazushito Manabe; Japan
1988 Seoul	Sevdalin Marinov; Bulgaria	Chun Byung-kwan; South Korea	He Zhuoqiang; China
1992 Barcelona	Ivan Ivanov; Bulgaria	Lin Qisheng; China	Traian Cihărean; Romania
1996 Atlanta	Halil Mutlu; Turkey	Zhang Xiangsen; China	Sevdalin Minchev; Bulgaria

==== Bantamweight ====
- –56 kg (1948–1968)
- 52–56 kg (1972–1992)
- 54–59 kg (1996)
- –56 kg (2000–2016)
- –61 kg (2020)

Games	Gold	Silver	Bronze
1948 London	Joseph DePietro; United States	Julian Creus; Great Britain	Richard Tom; United States
1952 Helsinki	Ivan Udodov; Soviet Union	Mahmoud Namjoo; Iran	Ali Mirzaei; Iran
1956 Melbourne	Charles Vinci; United States	Vladimir Stogov; Soviet Union	Mahmoud Namjoo; Iran
1960 Rome	Charles Vinci; United States	Yoshinobu Miyake; Japan	Esmaeil Elmkhah; Iran
1964 Tokyo	Aleksey Vakhonin; Soviet Union	Imre Földi; Hungary	Shiro Ichinoseki; Japan
1968 Mexico City	Mohammad Nassiri; Iran	Imre Földi; Hungary	Henryk Trębicki; Poland
1972 Munich	Imre Földi; Hungary	Mohammad Nassiri; Iran	Gennady Chetin; Soviet Union
1976 Montreal	Norair Nurikyan; Bulgaria	Grzegorz Cziura; Poland	Kenkichi Ando; Japan
1980 Moscow	Daniel Núñez; Cuba	Yurik Sarkisyan; Soviet Union	Tadeusz Dembonczyk; Poland
1984 Los Angeles	Wu Shude; China	Lai Runming; China	Masahiro Kotaka; Japan
1988 Seoul	Oksen Mirzoyan; Soviet Union	He Yingqiang; China	Liu Shoubin; China
1992 Barcelona	Chun Byung-kwan; South Korea	Liu Shoubin; China	Luo Jianming; China
1996 Atlanta	Tang Lingsheng; China	Leonidas Sabanis; Greece	Nikolay Peshalov; Bulgaria
2000 Sydney	Halil Mutlu; Turkey	Wu Wenxiong; China	Zhang Xiangxiang; China
2004 Athens	Halil Mutlu; Turkey	Wu Meijin; China	Sedat Artuç; Turkey
2008 Beijing	Long Qingquan; China	Hoang Anh Tuan; Vietnam	Eko Yuli Irawan; Indonesia
2012 London	Om Yun-chol; North Korea	Wu Jingbiao; China	Tran Le Quoc Toan; Vietnam
2016 Rio de Janeiro	Long Qingquan; China	Om Yun-chol; North Korea	Sinphet Kruaithong; Thailand
2020 Tokyo	Li Fabin; China	Eko Yuli Irawan; Indonesia	Igor Son; Kazakhstan

==== Light heavyweight ====
- 75–82.5 kg (1920–1992)
- 76–83 kg (1996)
- 77–85 kg (2000–2016)

Games	Gold	Silver	Bronze
1920 Antwerp	Ernest Cadine; France	Fritz Hünenberger; Switzerland	Erik Pettersson; Sweden
1924 Paris	Charles Rigoulot; France	Fritz Hünenberger; Switzerland	Leopold Friedrich; Austria
1928 Amsterdam	El Sayed Nosseir; Egypt	Louis Hostin; France	Jan Verheijen; Netherlands
1932 Los Angeles	Louis Hostin; France	Svend Olsen; Denmark	Henry Duey; United States
1936 Berlin	Louis Hostin; France	Eugen Deutsch; Germany	Ibrahim Wasif; Egypt
1948 London	Stanley Stanczyk; United States	Harold Sakata; United States	Gösta Magnusson; Sweden
1952 Helsinki	Trofim Lomakin; Soviet Union	Stanley Stanczyk; United States	Arkady Vorobyov; Soviet Union
1956 Melbourne	Tommy Kono; United States	Vasilijs Stepanovs; Soviet Union	Jim George; United States
1960 Rome	Ireneusz Palinski; Poland	Jim George; United States	Jan Bochenek; Poland
1964 Tokyo	Rudolf Plyukfelder; Soviet Union	Géza Tóth; Hungary	Győző Veres; Hungary
1968 Mexico City	Boris Selitsky; Soviet Union	Vladimir Belyaev; Soviet Union	Norbert Ozimek; Poland
1972 Munich	Leif Jenssen; Norway	Norbert Ozimek; Poland	György Horváth; Hungary
1976 Montreal	Valery Shary; Soviet Union	Trendafil Stoychev; Bulgaria	Péter Baczakó; Hungary
1980 Moscow	Yurik Vardanyan; Soviet Union	Blagoy Blagoev; Bulgaria	Dušan Poliačik; Czechoslovakia
1984 Los Angeles	Petre Becheru; Romania	Robert Kabbas; Australia	Ryoji Isaoka; Japan
1988 Seoul	Israil Arsamakov; Soviet Union	István Messzi; Hungary	Lee Hyung-kun; South Korea
1992 Barcelona	Pyrros Dimas; Greece	Krzysztof Siemion; Poland	none awarded
1996 Atlanta	Pyrros Dimas; Greece	Marc Huster; Germany	Andrzej Cofalik; Poland
2000 Sydney	Pyrros Dimas; Greece	Marc Huster; Germany	Giorgi Asanidze; Georgia
2004 Athens	Giorgi Asanidze; Georgia	Andrei Rybakou; Belarus	Pyrros Dimas; Greece
2008 Beijing	Lu Yong; China	Tigran Martirosyan; Armenia	Jadier Valladares; Cuba
2012 London	Adrian Zieliński; Poland	Kianoush Rostami; Iran	Tarek Yehia; Egypt
2016 Rio de Janeiro	Kianoush Rostami; Iran	Tian Tao; China	Denis Ulanov; Kazakhstan

==== First heavyweight ====
- 90–100 kg (1980–1992)
- 91–99 kg (1996)

Games	Gold	Silver	Bronze
1980 Moscow	Ota Zaremba; Czechoslovakia	Igor Nikitin; Soviet Union	Alberto Blanco; Cuba
1984 Los Angeles	Rolf Milser; West Germany	Vasile Groapa; Romania	Pekka Niemi; Finland
1988 Seoul	Pavel Kuznetsov; Soviet Union	Nicu Vlad; Romania	Peter Immesberger; West Germany
1992 Barcelona	Viktor Tregubov; Unified Team	Timur Taymazov; Unified Team	Waldemar Malak; Poland
1996 Atlanta	Akakios Kakiasvilis; Greece	Anatoly Khrapaty; Kazakhstan	Denys Gotfrid; Ukraine

==== Middle heavyweight ====
- 82.5 kg–90 kg (1952–1992)
- 83–91 kg (1996)
- 85–94 kg (2000–2016)
- 81–96 kg (2020)

Games	Gold	Silver	Bronze
1952 Helsinki	Norbert Schemansky; United States	Grigory Novak; Soviet Union	Lennox Kilgour; Trinidad and Tobago
1956 Melbourne	Arkady Vorobyov; Soviet Union	David Sheppard; United States	Jean Debuf; France
1960 Rome	Arkady Vorobyov; Soviet Union	Trofim Lomakin; Soviet Union	Louis Martin; Great Britain
1964 Tokyo	Vladimir Golovanov; Soviet Union	Louis Martin; Great Britain	Ireneusz Paliński; Poland
1968 Mexico City	Kaarlo Kangasniemi; Finland	Jaan Talts; Soviet Union	Marek Gołąb; Poland
1972 Munich	Andon Nikolov; Bulgaria	Atanas Shopov; Bulgaria	Hans Bettembourg; Sweden
1976 Montreal	David Rigert; Soviet Union	Lee James; United States	Atanas Shopov; Bulgaria
1980 Moscow	Péter Baczakó; Hungary	Rumen Aleksandrov; Bulgaria	Frank Mantek; East Germany
1984 Los Angeles	Nicu Vlad; Romania	Dumitru Petre; Romania	David Mercer; Great Britain
1988 Seoul	Anatoly Khrapaty; Soviet Union	Nail Mukhamedyarov; Soviet Union	Slawomir Zawada; Poland
1992 Barcelona	Kakhi Kakhiashvili; Unified Team	Sergey Syrtsov; Unified Team	Sergiusz Wolczaniecki; Poland
1996 Atlanta	Aleksey Petrov; Russia	Leonidas Kokas; Greece	Oliver Caruso; Germany
2000 Sydney	Akakios Kakiasvilis; Greece	Szymon Kołecki; Poland	Aleksey Petrov; Russia
2004 Athens	Milen Dobrev; Bulgaria	Khadzhimurat Akkaev; Russia	Eduard Tyukin; Russia
2008 Beijing	Szymon Kołecki; Poland	Arsen Kasabiev; Georgia	Yoandry Hernández; Cuba
2012 London	Saeid Mohammadpour; Iran	Kim Min-jae; South Korea	Tomasz Zieliński; Poland
2016 Rio de Janeiro	Sohrab Moradi; Iran	Vadzim Straltsou; Belarus	Aurimas Didžbalis; Lithuania
2020 Tokyo	Fares El-Bakh; Qatar	Keydomar Vallenilla; Venezuela	Anton Pliesnoi; Georgia

=== Women ===
==== Featherweight ====
- 53 kg (2000–2016)
- 55 kg (2020)

Games	Gold	Silver	Bronze
2000 Sydney	Yang Xia; China	Li Fengying; Chinese Taipei	Winarni Binti Slamet; Indonesia
2004 Athens	Udomporn Polsak; Thailand	Raema Lisa Rumbewas; Indonesia	Mabel Mosquera; Colombia
2008 Beijing	Prapawadee Jaroenrattanatarakoon; Thailand	Yoon Jin-hee; South Korea	Raema Lisa Rumbewas; Indonesia
2012 London	Hsu Shu-ching; Chinese Taipei	Citra Febrianti; Indonesia	Iulia Paratova; Ukraine
2016 Rio de Janeiro	Hsu Shu-ching; Chinese Taipei	Hidilyn Diaz; Philippines	Yoon Jin-hee; South Korea
2020 Tokyo	Hidilyn Diaz; Philippines	Liao Qiuyun; China	Zulfiya Chinshanlo; Kazakhstan

==== Middleweight ====
- 63 kg (2000–2016)
- 64 kg (2020)

Games	Gold	Silver	Bronze
2000 Sydney	Chen Xiaomin; China	Valentina Popova; Russia	Ioanna Khatziioannou; Greece
2004 Athens	Nataliya Skakun; Ukraine	Hanna Batsiushka; Belarus	Tatsiana Stukalava; Belarus
2008 Beijing	Pak Hyon-suk; North Korea	Lu Ying-chi; Chinese Taipei	Christine Girard; Canada
2012 London	Christine Girard; Canada	Milka Maneva; Bulgaria	Luz Acosta; Mexico
2016 Rio de Janeiro	Deng Wei; China	Choe Hyo-sim; North Korea	Karina Goricheva; Kazakhstan
2020 Tokyo	Maude Charron; Canada	Giorgia Bordignon; Italy	Chen Wen-huei; Chinese Taipei

== See also ==
- List of Asian Games medalists in weightlifting
- Weightlifting at the 1906 Intercalated Games — these Intercalated Games are no longer regarded as official Games by the International Olympic Committee
