= 1969 European Weightlifting Championships =

International weightlifting competition

1969 European Championships

The 1969 European Weightlifting Championships were held at the Torwar Hall in Warsaw, Poland from September 20 to September 28, 1969. This was the 48th edition of the event. There were 108 men in action from 19 nations. This tournament was a part of 1969 World Weightlifting Championships.

== Medal summary ==
Event	Gold		Silver		Bronze	
52 kg
Press	Vladislav Krishchishin; Soviet Union	112.5 kg	Sándor Holczreiter; Hungary	110.0 kg	Zygmunt Smalcerz; Poland	105.0 kg
Snatch	Vladimir Smetanin; Soviet Union	102.5 kg	Walter Szołtysek; Poland	100.0 kg	Vladislav Krishchishin; Soviet Union	97.5 kg
Clean & Jerk	Vladimir Smetanin; Soviet Union	130.0 kg	Walter Szołtysek; Poland	130.0 kg	Vladislav Krishchishin; Soviet Union	127.5 kg
Total	Vladislav Krishchishin; Soviet Union	337.5 kg WR	Vladimir Smetanin; Soviet Union	337.5 kg	Walter Szołtysek; Poland	335.0 kg
56 kg
Press	Imre Földi; Hungary	125.0 kg	Henryk Trębicki; Poland	112.5 kg	Atanas Kirov; Bulgaria	107.5 kg
Snatch	Henryk Trębicki; Poland	107.5 kg	Imre Földi; Hungary	105.0 kg	Atanas Kirov; Bulgaria	102.5 kg
Clean & Jerk	Atanas Kirov; Bulgaria	137.5 kg	Zoltan Fiat; Romania	127.5 kg	Norair Nurikyan; Bulgaria	125.0 kg
Total	Atanas Kirov; Bulgaria	347.5 kg	Zoltan Fiat; Romania	330.0 kg	Norair Nurikyan; Bulgaria	317.5 kg
60 kg
Press	Mladen Kuchev; Bulgaria	130.0 kg	Jan Wojnowski; Poland	122.5 kg	János Benedek; Hungary	120.0 kg
Snatch	Dito Shanidze; Soviet Union	115.0 kg	János Benedek; Hungary	115.0 kg	Mladen Kuchev; Bulgaria	112.5 kg
Clean & Jerk	Dito Shanidze; Soviet Union	150.0 kg	János Benedek; Hungary	145.0 kg	Mieczysław Nowak; Poland	145.0 kg
Total	Mladen Kuchev; Bulgaria	385.0 kg	Dito Shanidze; Soviet Union	380.0 kg	János Benedek; Hungary	380.0 kg
67.5 kg
Press	Zbigniew Kaczmarek; Poland	140.0 kg	Waldemar Baszanowski; Poland	140.0 kg	János Bagócs; Hungary	135.0 kg
Snatch	Waldemar Baszanowski; Poland	135.0 kg	Ondrej Hekel; Czechoslovakia	130.0 kg	János Bagócs; Hungary	127.5 kg
Clean & Jerk	Waldemar Baszanowski; Poland	170.0 kg	János Bagócs; Hungary	167.5 kg	Ondrej Hekel; Czechoslovakia	162.5 kg
Total	Waldemar Baszanowski; Poland	445.0 kg WR	János Bagócs; Hungary	430.0 kg	Zbigniew Kaczmarek; Poland	425.0 kg
75 kg
Press	Viktor Kurentsov; Soviet Union	152.5 kg	Juhani Mursu; Finland	145.0 kg	Leif Jenssen; Norway	142.5 kg
Snatch	Aimé Terme; France	140.0 kg	Viktor Kurentsov; Soviet Union	137.5 kg	Gábor Szarvas; Hungary	135.0 kg
Clean & Jerk	Viktor Kurentsov; Soviet Union	177.5 kg	Gábor Szarvas; Hungary	175.0 kg	Juhani Mursu; Finland	165.0 kg
Total	Viktor Kurentsov; Soviet Union	467.5 kg	Gábor Szarvas; Hungary	440.0 kg	Juhani Mursu; Finland	437.5 kg
82.5 kg
Press	Hans Bettembourg; Sweden	162.5 kg	Boris Selitsky; Soviet Union	160.0 kg	Károly Bakos; Hungary	160.0 kg
Snatch	Norbert Ozimek; Poland	145.0 kg	Valery Shary; Soviet Union	142.5 kg	Károly Bakos; Hungary	142.5 kg
Clean & Jerk	Károly Bakos; Hungary	185.0 kg	Valery Shary; Soviet Union	182.5 kg	Boris Selitsky; Soviet Union	182.5 kg
Total	Károly Bakos; Hungary	487.5 kg	Boris Selitsky; Soviet Union	482.5 kg	Norbert Ozimek; Poland	475.0 kg
90 kg
Press	Kaarlo Kangasniemi; Finland	175.0 kg	Karl Arnold; East Germany	170.0 kg	Bo Johansson; Sweden	165.0 kg
Snatch	Bo Johansson; Sweden	150.0 kg	Kaarlo Kangasniemi; Finland	150.0 kg	Géza Tóth; Hungary	145.0 kg
Clean & Jerk	Géza Tóth; Hungary	190.0 kg	Kaarlo Kangasniemi; Finland	190.0 kg	Bo Johansson; Sweden	185.0 kg
Total	Kaarlo Kangasniemi; Finland	515.0 kg	Bo Johansson; Sweden	500.0 kg	Géza Tóth; Hungary	495.0 kg
110 kg
Press	Jaan Talts; Soviet Union	180.0 kg	Eivind Rekustad; Norway	175.0 kg	Aleksandar Kraychev; Bulgaria	172.5 kg
Snatch	Jaan Talts; Soviet Union	155.0 kg	Kauko Kangasniemi; Finland	155.0 kg	Jean-Paul Fouletier; France	150.0 kg
Clean & Jerk	Jaan Talts; Soviet Union	212.5 kg WR	Kauko Kangasniemi; Finland	190.0 kg	Robert Wójcik; Poland	190.0 kg
Total	Jaan Talts; Soviet Union	547.5 kg	Kauko Kangasniemi; Finland	507.5 kg	Robert Wójcik; Poland	500.0 kg
+110 kg
Press	Serge Reding; Belgium	202.5 kg	Stanislav Batishchev; Soviet Union	192.5 kg	Ivan Atanasov; Bulgaria	192.5 kg
Snatch	Stanislav Batishchev; Soviet Union	165.0 kg	Leonid Zhabotinsky; Soviet Union	162.5 kg	Rudolf Mang; West Germany	155.0 kg
Clean & Jerk	Serge Reding; Belgium	215.0 kg	Stanislav Batishchev; Soviet Union	212.5 kg	Manfred Rieger; East Germany	205.0 kg
Total	Serge Reding; Belgium	570.0 kg	Stanislav Batishchev; Soviet Union	570.0 kg	Manfred Rieger; East Germany	537.5 kg

== Medal table ==
Ranking by Big (Total result) medals

Rank	Nation	Gold	Silver	Bronze	Total
1	Soviet Union (URS)	3	4	0	7
2	Bulgaria (BUL)	2	0	1	3
3	Hungary (HUN)	1	2	2	5
4	Finland (FIN)	1	1	1	3
5	Poland (POL)	1	0	4	5
6	Belgium (BEL)	1	0	0	1
7	Romania (ROU)	0	1	0	1
7	Sweden (SWE)	0	1	0	1
9	East Germany (GDR)	0	0	1	1
Totals (9 entries)		9	9	9	27
