= Weightlifting at the 1968 Summer Olympics =

Weightlifting at the Games of the XIX Olympiad
- Venue: Teatro de los Insurgentes
- Dates: 17–21 October 1968
- Competitors: 160 from 55 nations

The weightlifting competition at the 1968 Summer Olympics in Mexico City consisted of seven weight classes, all for men only. The competition was held from 17 to 21 October 1968 at the Teatro de los Insurgentes.

It also counted as 1968 World Weightlifting Championships. The Soviet Union finished first in the medal table after winning three gold medals. Japan, Iran, Finland and Poland won the remaining gold medals.

== Participating nations ==
- Argentina (1)
- Australia (2)
- Austria (1)
- Barbados (1)
- Belgium (2)
- Brazil (1)
- Bulgaria (5)
- Canada (4)
- Costa Rica (3)
- Cuba (5)
- Czechoslovakia (4)
- Dominican Republic (2)
- East Germany (3)
- Egypt (3)
- El Salvador (2)
- Finland (5)
- France (5)
- Great Britain (7)
- Greece (2)
- Guatemala (1)
- Guyana (1)
- Honduras (1)
- Hungary (7)
- India (1)
- Indonesia (3)
- Iran (4)
- Iraq (1)
- Iceland (1)
- Italy (3)
- Jamaica (1)
- Japan (7)
- Lebanon (1)
- Malaysia (2)
- Mexico (3)
- Netherlands (1)
- Netherlands Antilles (2)
- New Zealand (2)
- Nicaragua (1)
- Norway (1)
- Panama (2)
- Peru (1)
- Philippines (3)
- Poland (7)
- Portugal (1)
- Puerto Rico (6)
- Singapore (2)
- South Korea (6)
- Soviet Union (7)
- Sweden (2)
- Taiwan (5)
- Thailand (2)
- Trinidad and Tobago (1)
- United States (5)
- Virgin Islands (1)
- West Germany (5)

== Medal table ==
Rank	Nation	Gold	Silver	Bronze	Total
1	Soviet Union	3	3	0	6
2	Japan	1	1	1	3
3	Iran	1	1	0	2
4	Poland	1	0	4	5
5	Finland	1	0	0	1
6	Hungary	0	1	1	2
7	Belgium	0	1	0	1
8	United States	0	0	1	1
Totals (8 entries)		7	7	7	21

== Medal summary ==
Event	Gold		Silver		Bronze	
Bantamweight (56 kg)	Mohammad Nassiri; Iran	367.5 kg	Imre Földi; Hungary	367.5 kg	Henryk Trębicki; Poland	357.5 kg
Featherweight (60 kg)	Yoshinobu Miyake; Japan	392.5 kg	Dito Shanidze; Soviet Union	387.5 kg	Yoshiyuki Miyake; Japan	385.0 kg
Lightweight (67.5 kg)	Waldemar Baszanowski; Poland	437.5 kg	Parviz Jalayer; Iran	422.5 kg	Marian Zieliński; Poland	420.0 kg
Middleweight (75 kg)	Viktor Kurentsov; Soviet Union	475.0 kg	Masushi Ouchi; Japan	455.0 kg	Károly Bakos; Hungary	440.0 kg
Light heavyweight (82.5 kg)	Boris Selitsky; Soviet Union	485.0 kg	Vladimir Belyaev; Soviet Union	485.0 kg	Norbert Ozimek; Poland	472.5 kg
Middle heavyweight (90 kg)	Kaarlo Kangasniemi; Finland	517.5 kg	Jaan Talts; Soviet Union	507.5 kg	Marek Gołąb; Poland	495.0 kg
Heavyweight (+90 kg)	Leonid Zhabotinsky; Soviet Union	572.5 kg	Serge Reding; Belgium	555.0 kg	Joseph Dube; United States	555.0 kg

== See also ==
- World Weightlifting Championships
