= 1969 World Weightlifting Championships =

Sports competition

The 1969 Men's World Weightlifting Championships were held in Warsaw, Poland from September 20 to September 28, 1969. There were 166 men from 37 nations in the competition.

== Medal summary ==
Event	Gold		Silver		Bronze	
52 kg
Press	Vladislav Krishchishin; Soviet Union	112.5 kg	Sándor Holczreiter; Hungary	110.0 kg	Zygmunt Smalcerz; Poland	105.0 kg
Snatch	Vladimir Smetanin; Soviet Union	102.5 kg	Walter Szołtysek; Poland	100.0 kg	Chaiya Sukchinda; Thailand	97.5 kg
Clean & Jerk	Vladimir Smetanin; Soviet Union	130.0 kg	Walter Szołtysek; Poland	130.0 kg	Vladislav Krishchishin; Soviet Union	127.5 kg
Total	Vladislav Krishchishin; Soviet Union	337.5 kg WR	Vladimir Smetanin; Soviet Union	337.5 kg	Walter Szołtysek; Poland	335.0 kg
56 kg
Press	Imre Földi; Hungary	125.0 kg	Mohammad Nassiri; Iran	120.0 kg	Fernando Báez; Puerto Rico	115.0 kg
Snatch	Henryk Trębicki; Poland	107.5 kg	Imre Földi; Hungary	105.0 kg	Hiroshi Ono; Japan	105.0 kg
Clean & Jerk	Mohammad Nassiri; Iran	140.0 kg	Atanas Kirov; Bulgaria	137.5 kg	Hiroshi Ono; Japan	132.5 kg
Total	Mohammad Nassiri; Iran	360.0 kg	Atanas Kirov; Bulgaria	347.5 kg	Hiroshi Ono; Japan	342.5 kg
60 kg
Press	Mladen Kuchev; Bulgaria	130.0 kg	Yoshiyuki Miyake; Japan	125.0 kg	Jan Wojnowski; Poland	122.5 kg
Snatch	Masao Kato; Japan	117.5 kg	Yoshiyuki Miyake; Japan	115.0 kg	Dito Shanidze; Soviet Union	115.0 kg
Clean & Jerk	Dito Shanidze; Soviet Union	150.0 kg	Masao Kato; Japan	147.5 kg	Yoshiyuki Miyake; Japan	145.0 kg
Total	Yoshiyuki Miyake; Japan	385.0 kg	Mladen Kuchev; Bulgaria	385.0 kg	Dito Shanidze; Soviet Union	380.0 kg
67.5 kg
Press	Nasrollah Dehnavi; Iran	140.0 kg	Zbigniew Kaczmarek; Poland	140.0 kg	Waldemar Baszanowski; Poland	140.0 kg
Snatch	Waldemar Baszanowski; Poland	135.0 kg	Ondrej Hekel; Czechoslovakia	130.0 kg	János Bagócs; Hungary	127.5 kg
Clean & Jerk	Waldemar Baszanowski; Poland	170.0 kg	János Bagócs; Hungary	167.5 kg	Ondrej Hekel; Czechoslovakia	162.5 kg
Total	Waldemar Baszanowski; Poland	445.0 kg WR	János Bagócs; Hungary	430.0 kg	Zbigniew Kaczmarek; Poland	425.0 kg
75 kg
Press	Viktor Kurentsov; Soviet Union	152.5 kg	Juhani Mursu; Finland	145.0 kg	Leif Jenssen; Norway	142.5 kg
Snatch	Aimé Terme; France	140.0 kg	Viktor Kurentsov; Soviet Union	137.5 kg	Gábor Szarvas; Hungary	135.0 kg
Clean & Jerk	Viktor Kurentsov; Soviet Union	177.5 kg	Gábor Szarvas; Hungary	175.0 kg	Tamotsu Sunami; Japan	165.0 kg
Total	Viktor Kurentsov; Soviet Union	467.5 kg	Gábor Szarvas; Hungary	440.0 kg	Juhani Mursu; Finland	437.5 kg
82.5 kg
Press	Russell Knipp; United States	162.5 kg	Hans Bettembourg; Sweden	162.5 kg	Boris Selitsky; Soviet Union	160.0 kg
Snatch	Masushi Ouchi; Japan	152.5 kg WR	Norbert Ozimek; Poland	145.0 kg	Valery Shary; Soviet Union	142.5 kg
Clean & Jerk	Károly Bakos; Hungary	185.0 kg	Valery Shary; Soviet Union	182.5 kg	Boris Selitsky; Soviet Union	182.5 kg
Total	Masushi Ouchi; Japan	487.5 kg	Károly Bakos; Hungary	487.5 kg	Boris Selitsky; Soviet Union	482.5 kg
90 kg
Press	Kaarlo Kangasniemi; Finland	175.0 kg	Karl Arnold; East Germany	170.0 kg	Bo Johansson; Sweden	165.0 kg
Snatch	Bo Johansson; Sweden	150.0 kg	Kaarlo Kangasniemi; Finland	150.0 kg	Géza Tóth; Hungary	145.0 kg
Clean & Jerk	Géza Tóth; Hungary	190.0 kg	Kaarlo Kangasniemi; Finland	190.0 kg	Bakr El-Sayed Bassam; United Arab Republic	187.5 kg
Total	Kaarlo Kangasniemi; Finland	515.0 kg	Bo Johansson; Sweden	500.0 kg	Géza Tóth; Hungary	495.0 kg
110 kg
Press	Bob Bednarski; United States	182.5 kg	Jaan Talts; Soviet Union	180.0 kg	Eivind Rekustad; Norway	175.0 kg
Snatch	Bob Bednarski; United States	160.0 kg WR	Jaan Talts; Soviet Union	155.0 kg	Kauko Kangasniemi; Finland	155.0 kg
Clean & Jerk	Jaan Talts; Soviet Union	212.5 kg WR	Bob Bednarski; United States	212.5 kg	Kauko Kangasniemi; Finland	190.0 kg
Total	Bob Bednarski; United States	555.0 kg WR	Jaan Talts; Soviet Union	547.5 kg	Kauko Kangasniemi; Finland	507.5 kg
+110 kg
Press	Serge Reding; Belgium	202.5 kg	Joseph Dube; United States	202.5 kg	Stanislav Batishchev; Soviet Union	192.5 kg
Snatch	Stanislav Batishchev; Soviet Union	165.0 kg	Joseph Dube; United States	162.5 kg	Leonid Zhabotinsky; Soviet Union	162.5 kg
Clean & Jerk	Serge Reding; Belgium	215.0 kg	Stanislav Batishchev; Soviet Union	212.5 kg	Joseph Dube; United States	212.5 kg
Total	Joseph Dube; United States	577.5 kg	Serge Reding; Belgium	570.0 kg	Stanislav Batishchev; Soviet Union	570.0 kg

== Medal table ==
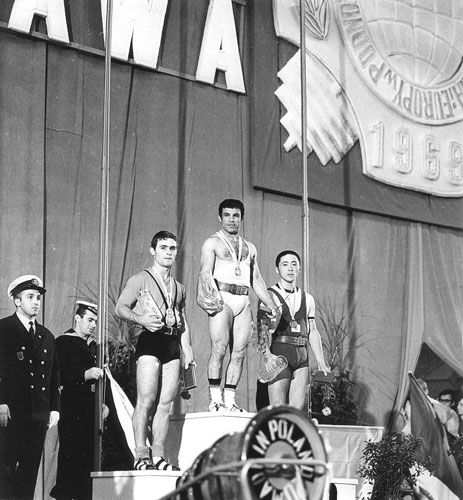
Medal winners of 56 kg. From left to right, Atanas Kirov, Mohammad Nassiri and Hiroshi Ono.

Ranking by Big (Total result) medals

Rank	Nation	Gold	Silver	Bronze	Total
1	Soviet Union	2	2	3	7
2	Japan	2	0	1	3
3	United States	2	0	0	2
4	Finland	1	0	2	3
4	Poland	1	0	2	3
6	Iran	1	0	0	1
7	Hungary	0	3	1	4
8	Bulgaria	0	2	0	2
9	Belgium	0	1	0	1
9	Sweden	0	1	0	1
Totals (10 entries)		9	9	9	27

Ranking by all medals: Big (Total result) and Small (Press, Snatch and Clean & Jerk)

Rank	Nation	Gold	Silver	Bronze	Total
1	Soviet Union	10	7	10	27
2	United States	5	3	1	9
3	Poland	4	4	5	13
4	Japan	4	3	5	12
5	Hungary	3	7	4	14
6	Iran	3	1	0	4
7	Finland	2	3	4	9
8	Belgium	2	1	0	3
9	Bulgaria	1	3	0	4
10	Sweden	1	2	1	4
11	France	1	0	0	1
12	Czechoslovakia	0	1	1	2
13	East Germany	0	1	0	1
14	Norway	0	0	2	2
15	Puerto Rico	0	0	1	1
15	Thailand	0	0	1	1
15	United Arab Republic	0	0	1	1
Totals (17 entries)		36	36	36	108
