= Weightlifting at the 1964 Summer Olympics =

Coordinates: 35.6643°N 139.6978°E

Weightlifting at the Games of the XVIII Olympiad
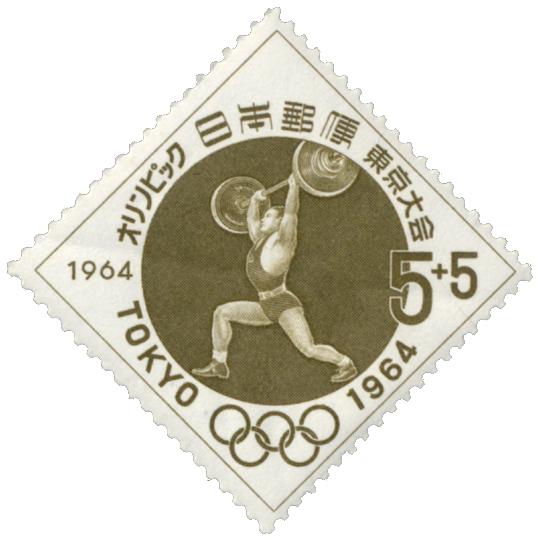
- Weightlifting at the 1964 Summer Olympics on a stamp of Japan.
- Venue: Shibuya Public Hall
- Dates: 11–18 October 1964
- Competitors: 149 from 42 nations

The weightlifting competition at the 1964 Summer Olympics in Tokyo consisted of seven weight classes, all for men only. It also counted as 1964 World Weightlifting Championships.

== Medal summary ==
Event	Gold		Silver		Bronze	
Bantamweight (56 kg)	Aleksey Vakhonin; Soviet Union	357.5 kg	Imre Földi; Hungary	355.0 kg	Shiro Ichinoseki; Japan	347.5 kg
Featherweight (60 kg)	Yoshinobu Miyake; Japan	397.5 kg	Isaac Berger; United States	382.5 kg	Mieczysław Nowak; Poland	377.5 kg
Lightweight (67.5 kg)	Waldemar Baszanowski; Poland	432.5 kg	Vladimir Kaplunov; Soviet Union	432.5 kg	Marian Zieliński; Poland	420.0 kg
Middleweight (75 kg)	Hans Zdražila; Czechoslovakia	445.0 kg	Viktor Kurentsov; Soviet Union	440.0 kg	Masushi Ouchi; Japan	437.5 kg
Light heavyweight (82.5 kg)	Rudolf Plyukfelder; Soviet Union	475.0 kg	Géza Tóth; Hungary	467.5 kg	Győző Veres; Hungary	467.5 kg
Middle heavyweight (90 kg)	Vladimir Golovanov; Soviet Union	487.5 kg	Louis Martin; Great Britain	475.0 kg	Ireneusz Paliński; Poland	467.5 kg
Heavyweight (+90 kg)	Leonid Zhabotinsky; Soviet Union	572.5 kg	Yury Vlasov; Soviet Union	570.0 kg	Norbert Schemansky; United States	537.5 kg

== Medal table ==
Rank	Nation	Gold	Silver	Bronze	Total
1	Soviet Union	4	3	0	7
2	Poland	1	0	3	4
3	Japan	1	0	2	3
4	Czechoslovakia	1	0	0	1
5	Hungary	0	2	1	3
6	United States	0	1	1	2
7	Great Britain	0	1	0	1
Totals (7 entries)		7	7	7	21

== See also ==
- World Weightlifting Championships
