= 1966 World Weightlifting Championships =

International weightlifting competition

1966 Men's World Championships

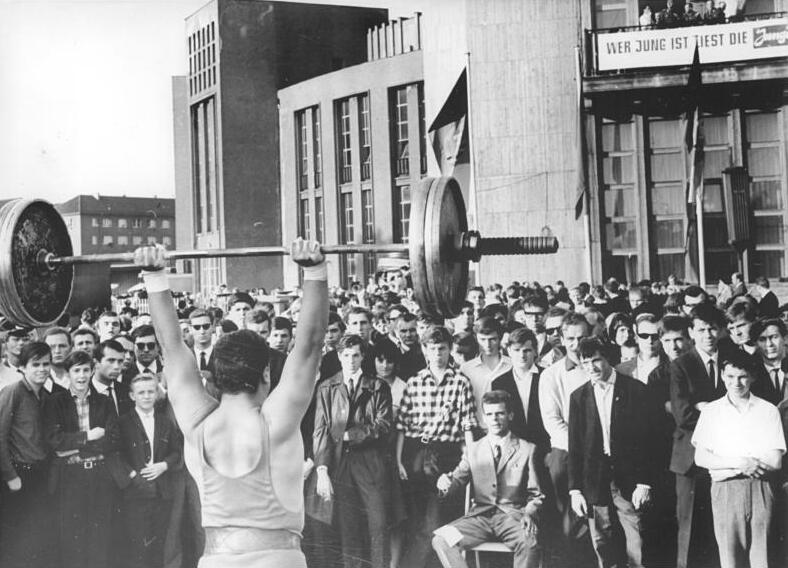
Publicity display in East Berlin

The 1966 Men's World Weightlifting Championships were held in East Berlin, East Germany from October 15 to October 21, 1966. There were 117 men in action from 28 nations.

== Medal summary ==
Event	Gold		Silver		Bronze	
Bantamweight; 56 kg	Aleksey Vakhonin; Soviet Union	362.5 kg	Imre Földi; Hungary	360.0 kg	Mohammad Nassiri; Iran	350.0 kg
Featherweight; 60 kg	Yoshinobu Miyake; Japan	387.5 kg	Mieczysław Nowak; Poland	382.5 kg	Yoshiyuki Miyake; Japan	370.0 kg
Lightweight; 67.5 kg	Yevgeny Katsura; Soviet Union	437.5 kg	Marian Zieliński; Poland	410.0 kg	Parviz Jalayer; Iran	405.0 kg
Middleweight; 75 kg	Viktor Kurentsov; Soviet Union	450.0 kg	Waldemar Baszanowski; Poland	447.5 kg	Werner Dittrich; East Germany	442.5 kg
Light heavyweight 82.5 kg	Vladimir Belyaev; Soviet Union	485.0 kg	Győző Veres; Hungary	485.0 kg	Hans Zdražila; Czechoslovakia	465.0 kg
Middle heavyweight 90 kg	Géza Tóth; Hungary	487.5 kg	Ireneusz Paliński; Poland	477.5 kg	Marek Gołąb; Poland	475.0 kg
Heavyweight +90 kg	Leonid Zhabotinsky; Soviet Union	567.5 kg	Bob Bednarski; United States	537.5 kg	Stanislav Batishchev; Soviet Union	530.0 kg

== Medal table ==
Rank	Nation	Gold	Silver	Bronze	Total
1	Soviet Union	5	0	1	6
2	Hungary	1	2	0	3
3	Japan	1	0	1	2
4	Poland	0	4	1	5
5	United States	0	1	0	1
6	Iran	0	0	2	2
7	Czechoslovakia	0	0	1	1
7	East Germany	0	0	1	1
Totals (8 entries)		7	7	7	21
