= 1963 World Weightlifting Championships =

International weightlifting competition

1963 Men's World Championships

The 1963 Men's World Weightlifting Championships were held in Stockholm, Sweden from September 7 to September 13, 1963. There were 134 men in action from 32 nations.

== Medal summary ==
Event	Gold		Silver		Bronze	
Bantamweight; 56 kg	Aleksey Vakhonin; Soviet Union	345.0 kg	Hiroshi Fukuda; Japan	340.0 kg	Shiro Ichinoseki; Japan	330.0 kg
Featherweight; 60 kg	Yoshinobu Miyake; Japan	375.0 kg	Isaac Berger; United States	367.5 kg	Imre Földi; Hungary	365.0 kg
Lightweight; 67.5 kg	Marian Zieliński; Poland	417.5 kg	Waldemar Baszanowski; Poland	410.0 kg	Vladimir Kaplunov; Soviet Union	410.0 kg
Middleweight; 75 kg	Aleksandr Kurynov; Soviet Union	437.5 kg	Mihály Huszka; Hungary	437.5 kg	Hans Zdražila; Czechoslovakia	422.5 kg
Light heavyweight 82.5 kg	Győző Veres; Hungary	477.5 kg	Rudolf Plyukfelder; Soviet Union	467.5 kg	Géza Tóth; Hungary	450.0 kg
Middle heavyweight 90 kg	Louis Martin; Great Britain	480.0 kg	Ireneusz Paliński; Poland	475.0 kg	Eduard Brovko; Soviet Union	470.0 kg
Heavyweight +90 kg	Yury Vlasov; Soviet Union	557.5 kg	Norbert Schemansky; United States	537.5 kg	Leonid Zhabotinsky; Soviet Union	527.5 kg

== Medal table ==
Rank	Nation	Gold	Silver	Bronze	Total
1	Soviet Union	3	1	3	7
2	Poland	1	2	0	3
3	Hungary	1	1	2	4
4	Japan	1	1	1	3
5	Great Britain	1	0	0	1
6	United States	0	2	0	2
7	Czechoslovakia	0	0	1	1
Totals (7 entries)		7	7	7	21
