= 1965 World Weightlifting Championships =

International weightlifting competition

1965 Men's World Championships

The 1965 Men's World Weightlifting Championships were held in Tehran, Iran from October 27 to November 3, 1965. There were 85 men in action from 24 nations.

== Medal summary ==
Event	Gold		Silver		Bronze	
Bantamweight; 56 kg	Imre Földi; Hungary	360.0 kg	Shiro Ichinoseki; Japan	355.0 kg	Yoshiyuki Miyake; Japan	345.0 kg
Featherweight; 60 kg	Yoshinobu Miyake; Japan	385.0 kg	Mieczysław Nowak; Poland	375.0 kg	Rudolf Kozłowski; Poland	360.0 kg
Lightweight; 67.5 kg	Waldemar Baszanowski; Poland	427.5 kg	Marian Zieliński; Poland	425.0 kg	Vladimir Kaplunov; Soviet Union	412.5 kg
Middleweight; 75 kg	Viktor Kurentsov; Soviet Union	437.5 kg	Werner Dittrich; East Germany	437.5 kg	Aleksandr Kurynov; Soviet Union	432.5 kg
Light heavyweight 82.5 kg	Norbert Ozimek; Poland	472.5 kg	Aleksandr Kidyayev; Soviet Union	460.0 kg	Jerzy Kaczkowski; Poland	445.0 kg
Middle heavyweight 90 kg	Louis Martin; Great Britain	487.5 kg	Vladimir Golovanov; Soviet Union	480.0 kg	Géza Tóth; Hungary	462.5 kg
Heavyweight +90 kg	Leonid Zhabotinsky; Soviet Union	552.5 kg	Gary Gubner; United States	545.0 kg	Károly Ecser; Hungary	522.5 kg

== Medal table ==
Rank	Nation	Gold	Silver	Bronze	Total
1	Poland	2	2	2	6
1	Soviet Union	2	2	2	6
3	Japan	1	1	1	3
4	Hungary	1	0	2	3
5	Great Britain	1	0	0	1
6	East Germany	0	1	0	1
6	United States	0	1	0	1
Totals (7 entries)		7	7	7	21
