= Weightlifting at the 1972 Summer Olympics – Men's 60 kg =

Weightlifting at the Olympics

60 kg at the Games of the XX Olympiad
- Venue: Weightlifting Hall 7, Gewichtheberhalle
- Dates: 29 August
- Competitors: 13 from 11 nations

Medalists
1st place, gold medalist(s)		Norair Nurikyan; Bulgaria
2nd place, silver medalist(s)		Dito Shanidze; Soviet Union
3rd place, bronze medalist(s)		János Benedek; Hungary

Total of best lifts in military press, snatch and jerk. Ties were broken by the lightest bodyweight.

== Final ==
Rank	Name	Nationality	Body weight	Military press (kg)				Snatch (kg)				Jerk (kg)				Total (kg)
Rank	Name	Nationality	Body weight	1	2	3	Result	1	2	3	Result	1	2	3	Result	Total (kg)
1st place, gold medalist(s)	Norair Nurikyan	Bulgaria	59.70	122.5	127.5	~~130.0~~	127.5 OR	112.5	~~117.5~~	117.5	117.5	147.5	157.5	–	157.5 WR	402.5 =WR
2nd place, silver medalist(s)	Dito Shanidze	Soviet Union	59.60	120.0	125.0	127.5	127.5 OR	115.0	~~120.0~~	120.0	120.0	147.5	152.5	~~155.0~~	152.5	400.0
3rd place, bronze medalist(s)	János Benedek	Hungary	59.85	120.0	125.0	~~130.0~~	125.0	115.0	~~120.0~~	120.0	120.0	145.0	~~150.0~~	~~150.0~~	145.0	390.0
4	Yoshinobu Miyake	Japan	59.60	120.0	~~125.0~~	~~125.0~~	120.0	115.0	~~120.0~~	120.0	120.0	145.0	~~150.0~~	~~150.0~~	145.0	385.0
5	Kurt Pittner	Austria	59.60	120.0	~~125.0~~	125.0	125.0	112.5	~~117.5~~	~~117.5~~	112.5	145.0	~~150.0~~	~~152.5~~	145.0	382.5
6	Rolando Chang	Cuba	58.90	112.5	117.5	120.0	120.0	107.5	112.5	115.0	115.0	137.5	~~142.5~~	142.5	142.5	377.5
7	Mieczysław Nowak	Poland	59.85	~~120.0~~	120.0	~~125.0~~	120.0	~~110.0~~	110.0	~~115.0~~	110.0	~~145.0~~	145.0	~~155.0~~	145.0	375.0
8	Peppino Tanti	Italy	60.00	120.0	~~125.0~~	~~125.0~~	120.0	~~102.5~~	102.5	107.5	107.5	140.0	~~145.0~~	~~145.0~~	140.0	367.5
9	Ymer Pampuri	Albania	59.35	~~120.0~~	125.0	127.5	127.5 OR	85.0	90.0	–	90.0	125.0	~~130.0~~	~~130.0~~	125.0	342.5
10	Chen Kue-Sen	Republic of China	59.80	100.0	~~110.0~~	110.0	110.0	92.5	~~100.0~~	~~100.0~~	92.5	120.0	125.0	~~130.0~~	125.0	327.5
11	Julio Martínez	Puerto Rico	59.80	92.5	~~100.0~~	~~100.0~~	92.5	100.0	105.0	~~110.0~~	105.0	127.5	~~135.0~~	~~135.0~~	127.5	325.0
–	Jan Wojnowski	Poland	59.30	120.0	~~125.0~~	~~125.0~~	120.0	115.0	120.0	~~125.0~~	120.0	~~147.5~~	~~147.5~~	~~147.5~~	NVL	DNF
–	Kenkichi Ando	Japan	59.30	~~125.0~~	~~125.0~~	~~125.0~~	NVL									DNF

Key: WR = world record; =WR = equaled world record; OR = Olympic record; DNF = did not finish; NVL = no valid lift
