= Brovko =

Brovko is a Slavic surname. Notable people with the surname include:

- Anatoly Brovko (born 1966), Russian politician
- Eduard Brovko (1936–1998), Soviet weightlifter
- Fyodor Brovko (1904–1960), Soviet and Moldavian politician
- Ihor Brovko (born 1992), Ukrainian football midfielder
