= Mohammad Nassiri =

Iranian weightlifter (born 1945)

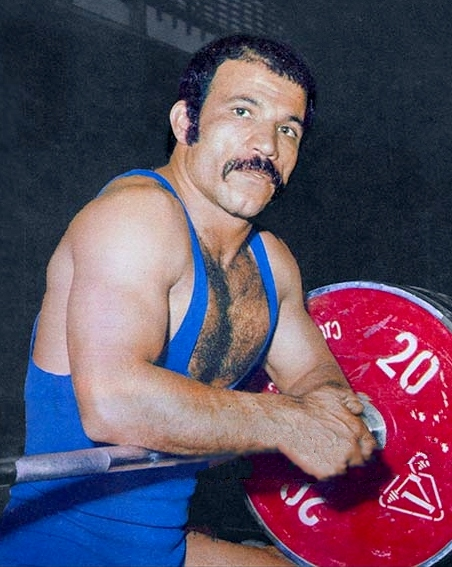

Personal information
- Born: 31 July 1945 (age 80) Tehran, Iran

Sport
- Sport: Weightlifting
- Coached by: Henrik Tamraz
Medal record
Representing Iran
Olympic Games
Gold medal – first place	1968 Mexico City	56 kg
Silver medal – second place	1972 Munich	56 kg
Bronze medal – third place	1976 Montreal	52 kg
World Championships
Gold medal – first place	1968 Mexico City	56 kg
Gold medal – first place	1969 Warsaw	56 kg
Gold medal – first place	1970 Columbus	56 kg
Gold medal – first place	1973 Havana	52 kg
Gold medal – first place	1974 Manila	52 kg
Silver medal – second place	1972 Munich	56 kg
Bronze medal – third place	1966 Berlin	56 kg
Bronze medal – third place	1971 Lima	56 kg
Bronze medal – third place	1976 Montreal	52 kg
Asian Games
Gold medal – first place	1966 Bangkok	56 kg
Gold medal – first place	1970 Bangkok	56 kg
Gold medal – first place	1974 Tehran	Total - 52 kg
Gold medal – first place	1974 Tehran	Clean & jerk - 52 kg
Silver medal – second place	1974 Tehran	Snatch - 52 kg
Asian Championships
Gold medal – first place	1971 Manila	56 kg
Gold medal – first place	1977 Baghdad	56 kg
Bronze medal – third place	1965 Tehran	56 kg

Mohammad Nasiri Seresht (Persian: محمد نصیری سرشت; born 31 July 1945) is a retired Iranian weightlifter. He competed at the 1964, 1968, 1972 and 1976 Olympics and won a gold, a silver and a bronze medal. He also won gold medals at the Asian Games in 1966, 1970 and 1974 and at the world championships in 1968-70 and 1973–74, placing second in 1972 and third in 1966, 1971 and 1976. Between 1966 and 1973 he set 15 ratified world records: 10 in clean and jerk, 3 in the press and 2 in the total. In 1995 he was inducted into the International Weightlifting Federation Hall of Fame.

Nasiri took up weightlifting aged 13. He mostly competed in the 56 kg category, but for the 1973 World Championships in Havana he lowered his body weight to 52 kg, and even shaved his head for that. In Havana he set four world records within one day. He stayed in the 52 kg division for the rest of his career.

== World championships ==
Year	Place	Weight	Medal			
Year	Place	Weight	Press	Snatch	Cl&Jerk	Total
1965	Tehran, Iran	56 kg	—	—	—	
1966	East Berlin, East Germany	56 kg	—	—	—	3rd place, bronze medalist(s)
1968	Mexico City, Mexico	56 kg	—	—	—	1st place, gold medalist(s)
1969	Warsaw, Poland	56 kg	2nd place, silver medalist(s)		1st place, gold medalist(s)	1st place, gold medalist(s)
1970	Columbus, United States	56 kg	3rd place, bronze medalist(s)		1st place, gold medalist(s)	1st place, gold medalist(s)
1971	Lima, Peru	56 kg	1st place, gold medalist(s)		2nd place, silver medalist(s)	3rd place, bronze medalist(s)
1972	Munich, West Germany	56 kg	2nd place, silver medalist(s)		2nd place, silver medalist(s)	2nd place, silver medalist(s)
1973	Havana, Cuba	52 kg	—		1st place, gold medalist(s)	1st place, gold medalist(s)
1974	Manila, Philippines	52 kg	—	3rd place, bronze medalist(s)	1st place, gold medalist(s)	1st place, gold medalist(s)
1976	Montreal, Canada	52 kg	—		2nd place, silver medalist(s)	3rd place, bronze medalist(s)
1977	Stuttgart, West Germany	52 kg	—		2nd place, silver medalist(s)	

- Olympic Games 1968, 1972 and 1976 counted as World Championships too.
- No medals for individual lifts before 1969.
- Press was removed from Olympic weightlifting after 1972.

== Olympics ==
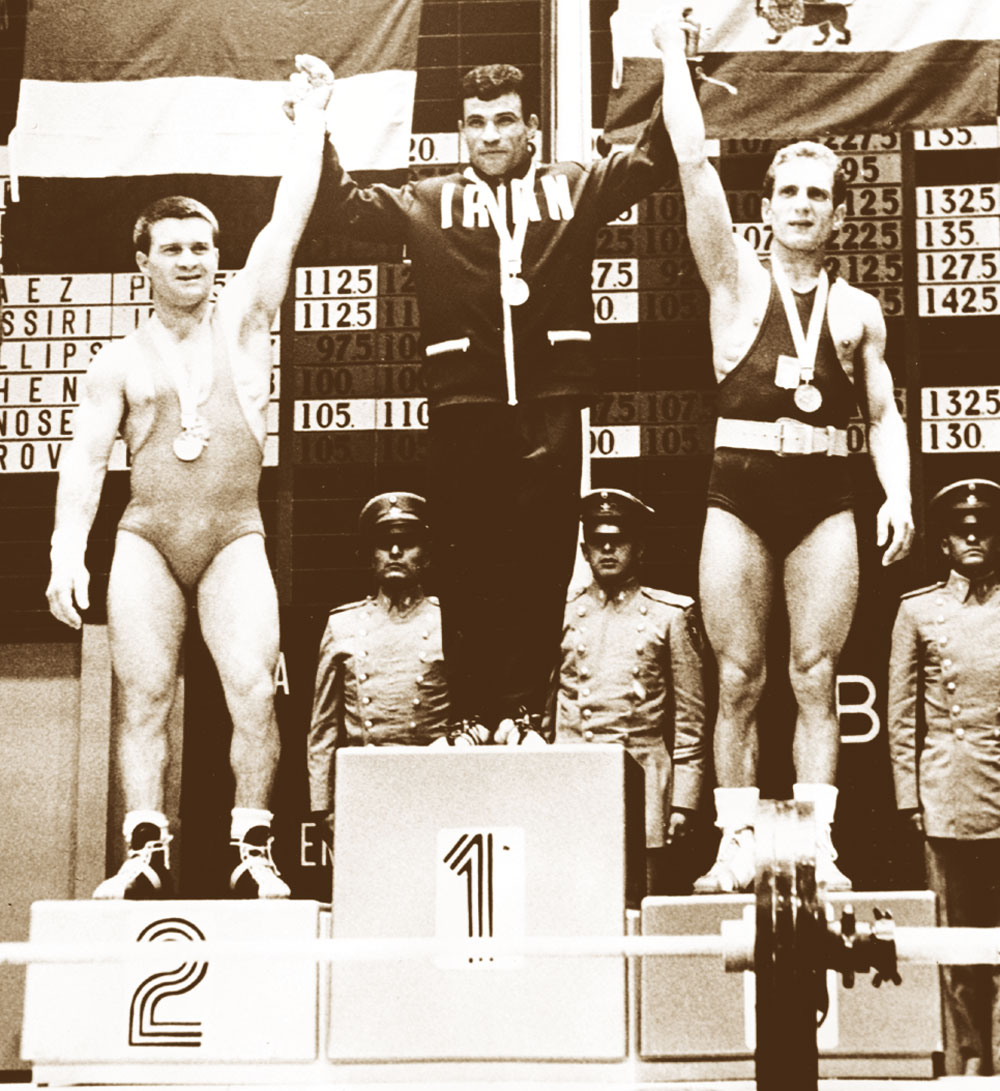
Podium of Men's 56 kg at Weightlifting at the 1968 Summer Olympics. From left to right, Imre Földi, Mohammad Nassiri and Henryk Trębicki.

Year	Venue	Weight	Military Press (kg)				Snatch (kg)				Clean & Jerk (kg)					Total	Rank
Year	Venue	Weight	1	2	3	Rank	1	2	3	Rank	1	2	3	4	Rank	Total	Rank
Olympic Games
1964	Tokyo, Japan	56 kg	97.5	102.5	105	4	85	~~90~~	~~90~~	22	~~120~~	~~120~~	120		18	310	15
1968	Mexico City, Mexico	56 kg	112.5	~~117.5~~	~~117.5~~	4	100	~~105~~	105	3	142.5	150	--		1	367.5	1st place, gold medalist(s)
1972	Munich, Germany	56 kg	120	125	127.5	1	100	~~105~~	~~105~~	10	142.5	~~152.5~~	~~152.5~~		1	370	2nd place, silver medalist(s)
1976	Montreal, Canada	52 kg					90	100	~~102.5~~	4	~~135~~	135	~~142.5~~	~~141.5~~	2	235	3rd place, bronze medalist(s)
