= Kidyayev =

Kidyayev or Kidyaev (Russian: Кидяев) is a Russian masculine surname, its feminine counterpart is Kidyayeva or Kidyaeva. It may refer to

- Aleksandr Kidyayev (born 1940), Soviet weightlifter
- Viktor Kidyayev (born 1956), Russian politician
- Yury Kidyayev (born 1955), Soviet handball player
