= Batishchev =

Batishchev (masculine, Russian: Батищев) or Batishcheva (feminine, Russian: Батищева) is a Russian surname. Notable people with the surname include:

- Oleksandr Batyschev (born 1991), Ukrainian football player
- Stanislav Batishchev (1940–2011), Soviet heavyweight weightlifter
