= Hiroshi Ono (weightlifter) =

Japanese weightlifter (born 1950)

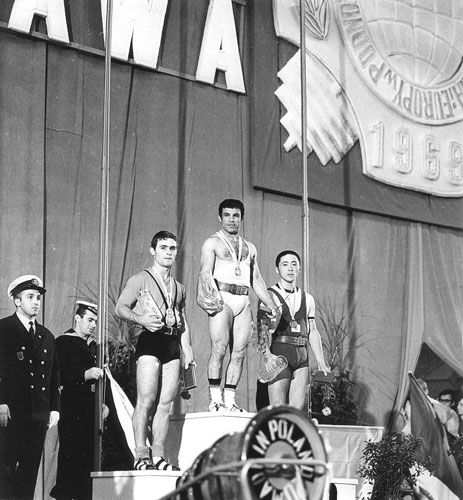
- Ono (3rd place) at 1969 World Weightlifting Championship

Personal information
- Nationality: Japanese
- Born: 23 March 1950 (age 76)

Sport
- Sport: Weightlifting
Medal record
Representing Japan
World Weightlifting Championships
Bronze medal – third place	1969 Warsaw	-56 kg

Hiroshi Ono (born 23 March 1950) is a Japanese weightlifter. He competed in the men's bantamweight event at the 1972 Summer Olympics.
