= Bob Bednarski =

American weightlifter (1944–2004)

Robert Bednarski

Personal information
- Born: April 5, 1944 Hartford, Connecticut, U.S.
- Died: February 22, 2004 (aged 59) Springfield, Massachusetts, U.S.

Sport
- Sport: Olympic weightlifting
Medal record
Representing United States
World Weightlifting Championships
Silver medal – second place	1966 East Berlin	+90 kg
Gold medal – first place	1969 Warsaw	-110 kg
Bronze medal – third place	1970 Columbus	-110 kg

Robert L. Bednarski (April 5, 1944 – February 22, 2004) was an American heavyweight weightlifter. He set 12 world record in 1968–69 and won three medals at the world championships, including a gold in 1969.

== Career ==
During his career, Bednarski won five national championships and set 12 ratified world records. He was relatively small for heavyweight weightlifter and relied on his agility. In 1966, he placed second at the world championships, but during the 1967 Pan American Games suffered a career-threatening elbow injury. He recovered, and the next year set two world records at the national championships. At the 1968 US Olympic Trials he placed third, and was not selected for the Olympic team.His off day lifting at trials was a disappointment with fans that thought he had the best chance to beat the Olympic champion.

He won the world title the next year in the new lower weight 110 kg class, and placed third in 1970. In December 1969, Bednarski and three other weightlifters associated with the 1968 Summer Olympics met with President Richard Nixon for seven minutes at the White House along with Pennsylvania congressman George Atlee Goodling. In 1983, he was inducted into the United States Weightlifting Federation Hall of Fame.

== Family ==
Bednarski was born in Hartford, Connecticut, to parents John and Helen, and had three brothers, John, Gary, and Richard, and three sisters, Judie Valois, Carol Ferrelli, and Brenda Paris. He was married to Kathy (Gacek) for 29 years. They had a son Bobby and a daughter Sheryl. Bednarski loved animals, and had three poodles.

== Legacy ==
The Barksi Snatch is named after Bednarski, a challenging movement that includes snatching the weight three times from the hip without dropping the bar or using the assistance of straps around the hands.
