= Ondrej Hekel =

Czechoslovak weightlifter

Personal information
- Born: 16 February 1944 Brashlyanitsa, Bulgaria
- Died: 23 July 2009 (aged 65) Bratislava, Slovakia

Sport
- Country: Czechoslovakia
- Sport: Weightlifting
- Weight class: 67.5 kg
- Club: ŽD Bohumín, Bohumín (CSK)
- Team: National team
Medal record
Men's Weightlifting
Representing Czechoslovakia
World Championships
Silver medal – second place	1969	67.5 kg (snatch)
Bronze medal – third place	1969	67.5 kg (clean & jerk)

Ondrej Hekel (16 February 1944 – 23 July 2009) was a Slovak male weightlifter. He competed in the 67.5 kg category and represented Czechoslovakia at international competitions.

During his career, Ondrej Hekel was Czechoslovakia's best weightlifter. For 12 years in a row, he won a national title (first in the lightweight, later middleweight), and he was named Czechoslovak lifter of the year on three occasions. Internationally, his only overall medal came at the 1971 European Championships, where he placed third. In 1972, he was close to the medals at the Olympics (doubling as the World Championships), placing 4th. But Hekel collected event medals in the snatch, winning twice at the Europeans and once at the World Championships (1971). He won the silver medal in the snatch at the 1969 World Weightlifting Championships lifting 130.0 kg.
