= Aleksey Vakhonin =

Russian weightlifter

- Vakhonin assuming a stork pose while winning the 1964 Summer Olympics in Tokyo

Personal information
- Born: 10 March 1935 Gavrilovka, Kemerovo Oblast, Russian SSR, Soviet Union
- Died: 1 September 1993 (aged 58) Shakhty, Russia
- Height: 1.56 m (5 ft 1 in)
- Weight: 58 kg (128 lb)

Sport
- Sport: weightlifting
- Club: Trud Shakhty
Medal record
Representing the Soviet Union
Olympic Games
Gold medal – first place	1964 Tokyo	Bantamweight
World Weightlifting Championships
Gold medal – first place	1963 Stockholm	56 kg
Gold medal – first place	1964 Tokyo	56 kg
Gold medal – first place	1966 East Berlin	56 kg
European Weightlifting Championships
Gold medal – first place	1963 Estocolmo	56 kg
Gold medal – first place	1965 Sofia	56 kg
Gold medal – first place	1966 Berlin	56 kg
Bronze medal – third place	1968 Leningrad	56 kg
USSR Weightlifting Championships
Gold medal – first place	1961 Dnepropetrovsk	56 kg
Gold medal – first place	1962 Tbilisi	56 kg
Gold medal – first place	1963 Moscow	56 kg
Gold medal – first place	1964 Kiev	56 kg
Silver medal – second place	1965 Yerevan	56 kg
Gold medal – first place	1966 Novosibirsk	56 kg
Gold medal – first place	1967 Moscow	56 kg
Silver medal – second place	1968 Lugansk	56 kg
Silver medal – second place	1969 Rostov	56 kg
Silver medal – second place	1970 Vilnius	56 kg

Aleksey Ivanovich Vakhonin (Russian: Алексей Иванович Вахонин, 10 March 1935 – 1 September 1993) was a former Russian weightlifter and Olympic champion who competed for the Soviet Union. He won a gold medal at the 1964 Summer Olympics in Tokyo.

== Biography ==
Vakhonin was born in the village Gavrilovka of Kemerovo Oblast. As his father died in World War II, the family lived very poorly, and Aleksei had to leave school and start working as miner. Eventually, he fell into bad company and got addicted to alcohol and smoking. Luckily, he was noticed by the renowned weightlifter Rudolf Plyukfelder, who noticed talents in Vakhonin and invited him to move to Kiselevsk for training and working at a mine there. It took Plyukfelder several years of hard work to convert a hooligan into a sportsman. In 1961 Vakhonin became the national champion winning over five-time world champion Vladimir Stogov. In 1963 he became world champion in the bantamweight with a total of 345 kg.

The peak of sporting career came for Vakhonin at the 1964 Olympic Games in Tokyo where he had a dramatic competition with Imre Foldi. After snatch and clean and press Foldi had a lead of 2.5 kg, and after setting a new world record in clean and jerk (135 kg) was already congratulated as the winner. In response, Vakhonin lifted 137.5 kg, but Foldi did the same. Vakhonin had to lift 142.5 kg to win, which he did. While standing with the weight above his head, he lifted one leg in a stork-like manner to show that the celebrations were premature and he could do more if needed.

After a failure at the World Championships in Tehran (1965) Vakhonin rebounded by winning in 1966 in Berlin, defeating Foldi once again. In total he won three world (1963, 1964 and 1966) and three European (1963, 1965 and 1966) and six national championships (1961–1964, 1966 and 1967); he set six world records (five in the clean & jerk, and one in the total) and 20 national records. He was awarded the Order of the Badge of Honour in 1964. He retired from sport in 1970 to work as a miner and weightlifting coach. In his later years he got again addicted to alcohol, which led to a tragic death in a brawl in 1993. Since 1994, a weightlifting tournament is held in his honor in Shakhty, the city where he lived his last years.
