= Masao Kato (weightlifter) =

Japanese weightlifter

Personal information
- Nationality: Japanese
- Born: 26 March 1950 (age 75)

Sport
- Sport: Weightlifting

Masao Kato (born 26 March 1950) is a Japanese weightlifter. He competed in the men's lightweight event at the 1972 Summer Olympics.
