= Hiromi Miyake =

Japanese weightlifter (born 1985)

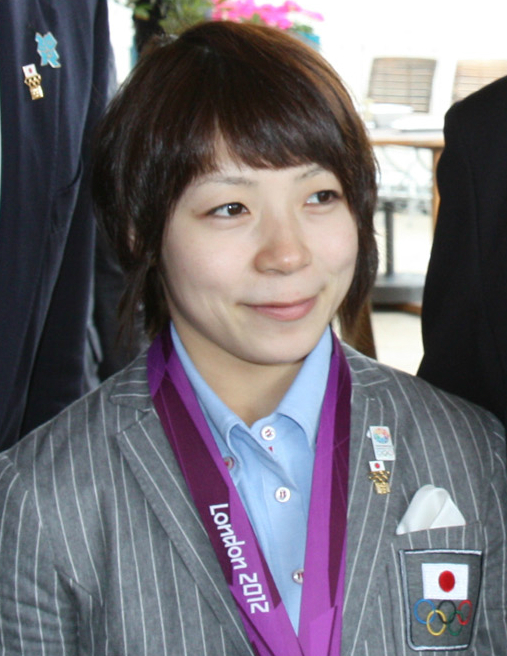
- Miyake at Japan return, 2012, with her London 2012 silver medal.

Personal information
- Born: 18 November 1985 (age 40) Niiza, Saitama, Japan
- Height: 146 cm (4 ft 9 in)
- Weight: 49 kg (108 lb)

Sport
- Country: Japan
- Sport: Weightlifting
- Event: 48kg
- Coached by: Yoshiyuki Miyake
Medal record
Olympic Games
Silver medal – second place	2012 London	–48 kg
Bronze medal – third place	2016 Rio de Janeiro	–48 kg
World Championships
Bronze medal – third place	2006 Santo Domingo	–48 kg
Bronze medal – third place	2015 Houston	–48 kg

Hiromi Miyake (三宅 宏実, Miyake Hiromi), born 18 November 1985) is a Japanese retired weightlifter. In the 48kg category, she won the silver medal at the 2012 Olympics and won bronze at the 2016 Olympics. Her father and coach is Yoshiyuki Miyake, who was a bronze medallist in weightlifting at the 1968 Mexico City Olympics. Her uncle Yoshinobu Miyake was a gold medalist in weightlifting at the 1964 and 1968 Olympics.

She is an employee of Ichigo Inc., a Japanese sustainable infrastructure company.

== Career ==
At the 2004 Summer Olympics she ranked 9th in the 48 kg category.

Miyake participated in the women's -48 kg class at the 2006 World Weightlifting Championships and won the bronze medal, finishing behind Yang Lian and Wiratthaworn Aree. She snatched 80 kg and clean and jerked an additional 108 kg for a total of 188 kg, 29 kg behind winner Qiu, but as much as second placed Aree, who because of her lighter weight was ranked in a better position.

At the 2008 Summer Olympics she ranked 6th in the 48 kg category.

In July 2012, Miyake won the silver medal at the 2012 Summer Olympics in the 48 kg category.

In August 2016, Miyake was back on the podium at the 2016 Summer Olympics by winning the Bronze medal in the 48 kg category.

At the 2020 Summer Olympics in Tokyo, Japan, she did not successfully complete the clean and jerk in the women's 49 kg event and she did not place.
