= Eivind Rekustad =

Norwegian weightlifter (1948–1992)

Personal information
- Born: 20 November 1948 Fredrikstad, Norway
- Died: 1 August 1992 (aged 43) Fredrikstad, Norway
- Height: 187 cm (6 ft 2 in)
- Weight: 110 kg (243 lb)

Sport
- Country: Norway
- Sport: Weightlifting
- Weight class: 110 kg
- Club: Lenja AK, Fredrikstad (NOR)
- Team: National team
Medal record
Men's Weightlifting
Representing Norway
World Championships
Bronze medal – third place	1969	110 kg (press)
- Updated on 12 November 2016

Eivind Rekustad (20 November 1948 – 1 August 1992) was a Norwegian male former weightlifter, who competed in the 110 kg category and represented Norway at international competitions. He won the bronze medal in the press at the 1969 World Weightlifting Championships in the 110 kg category lifting 175.0 kg. He participated at the 1972 Summer Olympics in the 110 kg event.
