= Bo Johansson (weightlifter) =

Swedish weightlifter (born 1945)

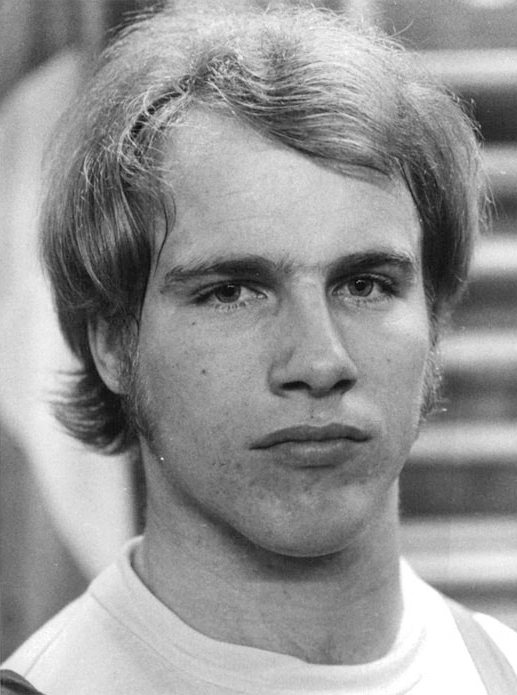

Personal information
- Born: 7 February 1945 (age 81) Gothenburg, Sweden
- Height: 175 cm (5 ft 9 in)
- Weight: 90 kg (198 lb)

Sport
- Sport: Weightlifting
- Club: Mossebergs AK, Gothenburg; Stockholms Spårvägars GIF
Medal record
Representing Sweden
World Weightlifting Championships
Silver medal – second place	1969 Sofia	-90 kg
Bronze medal – third place	1971 Lima	-90 kg
European Weightlifting Championships
Silver medal – second place	1968 Leningrad	-90 kg
Silver medal – second place	1969 Sofia	-90 kg
Bronze medal – third place	1970 Szombathely	-90 kg
Silver medal – second place	1971 Sofia	-90 kg

Bo Johansson (born 7 February 1945) is a retired Swedish middle-heavyweight weightlifter. Between 1968 and 1971 he won six medals at the world and European championships and set five world records: four in the press and one on the clean and jerk.

Bo Johansson grew up as a bodybuilding fan. At the age of 16 he also took up weightlifting, and in 1966 became the Swedish Junior Champion in the light-heavyweight division. In 1968 he won the national senior heavyweight title with a total of 490 kg. He also placed fourth in the 1968 Summer Olympics and trained for the 1972 Summer Olympics, but was left out of the Olympic team after a conflict with the Swedish sports officials. In the early 1970s he won several Nordic bodybuilding competitions, becoming Mr. Sweden and Mr. Scandinavia, but his career as a weightlifter declined.
