= Jerzy Kaczkowski =

Polish weightlifter

Personal information
- Nationality: Polish
- Born: 16 May 1938; Warsaw
- Died: 14 July 1988 (aged 50)

Sport
- Sport: Weightlifting

Jerzy Kaczkowski (16 May 1938 in Warsaw - 14 July 1988 in Warsaw) was a Polish weightlifter. He was born in Warsaw. Among his achievements was a fourth place at the 1964 Summer Olympics, and a bronze medal at the 1965 World Championships.
