= Gábor Szarvas =

Hungarian weightlifter (1943–1992)

Personal information
- Born: 18 November 1943 Újpest, Hungary
- Died: 3 January 1992 (aged 48) Budapest, Hungary
- Height: 165 cm (5 ft 5 in)
- Weight: 75 kg (165 lb)

Sport
- Country: Hungary
- Sport: Weightlifting
- Weight class: 75 kg
- Club: Testvériség
- Team: National team
Medal record
Men's Weightlifting
Representing Hungary
World Championships
Silver medal – second place	1969 Warsaw	75 kg
Bronze medal – third place	1970 Columbus	75 kg
- Updated on 6 October 2016

Gábor Szarvas (18 November 1943 in Újpest - 3 January 1992 in Budapest) was a Hungarian male weightlifter, who competed in the middleweight class and represented Hungary at international competitions. He won the silver medal at the 1969 World Weightlifting Championships and the bronze medal at the 1970 World Weightlifting Championships, both in the 75 kg category. He participated at the 1972 Summer Olympics in the 75 kg event. Szarvas had furthermore the following podium finishes at major championships: second in the 1969 European Championships Middleweight class (440.0 kg); second in the 1970 European Championships Middleweight class (452.5 kg); second in the 1971 European Championships Middleweight class (460.0 kg); second in the 1978 European Championships Featherweight class (275.0 kg).
