= Stanislav Batishchev =

Soviet weightlifter (1940–2011)

Personal information
- Born: 1940
- Died: 22 May 2011 (aged 70) Donetsk, Ukraine

Sport
- Sport: Weightlifting
Medal record
Representing the Soviet Union
World Weightlifting Championships
Bronze medal – third place	1966 East Berlin	Heavyweight
Bronze medal – third place	1969 Warsaw	Super heavyweight
Bronze medal – third place	1973 Havana	Super heavyweight
European Weightlifting Championships
Silver medal – second place	1966 East Berlin	Heavyweight
Silver medal – second place	1969 Warsaw	Super heavyweight
Silver medal – second place	1971 Sofia	Super heavyweight
Silver medal – second place	1973 Madrid	Super heavyweight

Stanislav Mikhailovich Batishchev (Russian: Станислав Михайлович Батищев, 1940 – 22 May 2011) was a Soviet heavyweight weightlifter. Between 1966 and 1973 he won four European silver medals and three bronze medals at world championships. In 1970 he set a world record in the press. His career was hindered by severe competition within the Soviet Union, primarily with Vasily Alekseyev and Leonid Zhabotinsky.
