= Masushi Ouchi =

Japanese weightlifter (1943–2011)

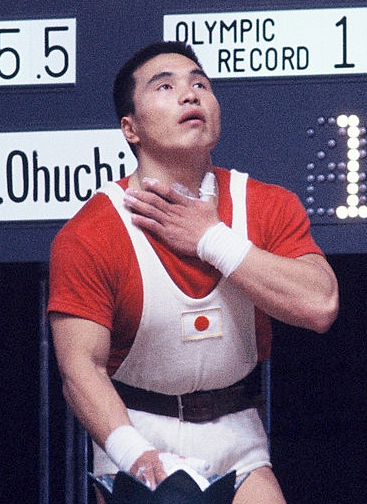
- Ouchi at the 1964 Olympics

Personal information
- Born: September 28, 1943 Kōriyama, Fukushima, Japan
- Died: June 6, 2011 (aged 67)
- Education: Hosei University
- Height: 1.65 m (5 ft 5 in)
- Weight: 80 kg (176 lb)

Sport
- Sport: Weightlifting
Medal record
Representing Japan
Olympic Games
Bronze medal – third place	1964 Tokyo	-75 kg
Silver medal – second place	1968 Mexico City	-75 kg
World Championships
Bronze medal – third place	1964 Tokyo	-75 kg
Silver medal – second place	1968 Mexico City	-75 kg
Gold medal – first place	1969 Warsaw	-82.5 kg
Asian Games
Gold medal – first place	1966 Bangkok	-75 kg
Gold medal – first place	1970 Bangkok	-82.5 kg

Masushi Ōuchi (大内 仁, Ōuchi Masushi; September 28, 1943 – June 6, 2011) was a Japanese weightlifter who won a bronze medal at the 1964 Summer Olympics and a silver medal at the 1968 Summer Olympics. He won two gold medals at the Asian Games in 1966 and 1970. He further became the world champion in the light-heavyweight category in 1969. In 1965–1969 Ouchi set eight world records – six in the snatch and two in the total. Later in life, Ouchi won four world titles in the masters category.

Ouchi was born in Kōriyama, Fukushima, Japan, on September 28, 1943. He took weightlifting as a student at Hosei University and an employee for the Tokyo Metropolitan Police Department. He died on June 6, 2011, at the age of 67.
