= Marian Zieliński =

Polish weightlifter (1929–2005)

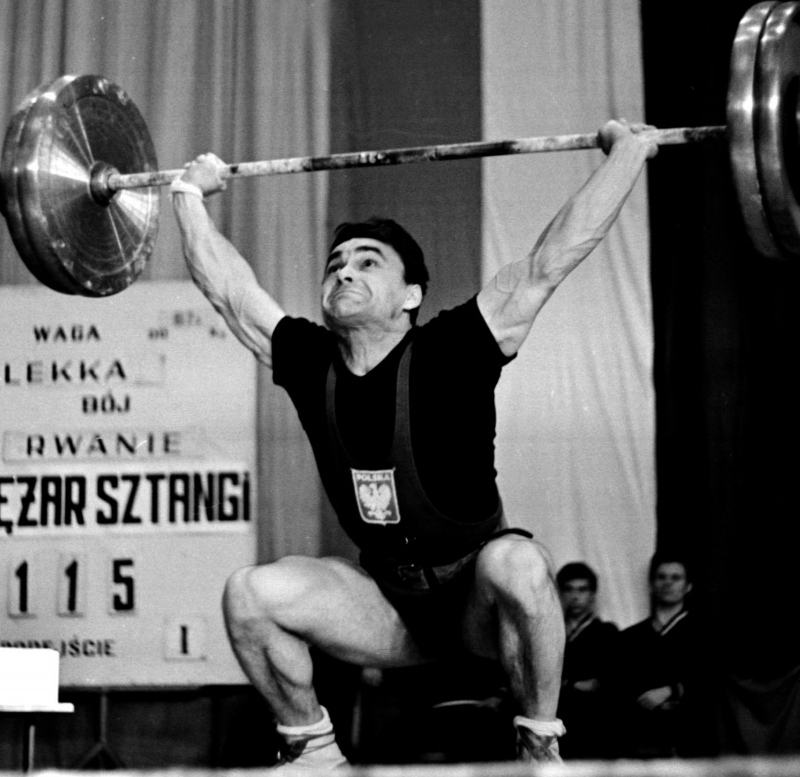
- Zieliński in 1963

Personal information
- Born: 24 December 1929 Chełm, Poland
- Died: 13 October 2005 (aged 75) Warsaw, Poland
- Height: 160 cm (5 ft 3 in)

Sport
- Sport: weightlifting
- Club: Legia Warszawa
- Coached by: Józef Styczyński
Medal record
Representing Poland
Olympic Games
Bronze medal – third place	1956 Melbourne	-60 kg
Bronze medal – third place	1964 Tokyo	-67.5 kg
Bronze medal – third place	1968 Mexico City	-67.5 kg
World Championships
Gold medal – first place	1959 Warsaw	-60 kg
Bronze medal – third place	1961 Vienna	-67.5 kg
Bronze medal – third place	1962 Budapest	-67.5 kg
Gold medal – first place	1963 Stockholm	-67.5 kg
Bronze medal – third place	1964 Tokyo	-67.5 kg
Silver medal – second place	1965 Tehran	-67.5 kg
Silver medal – second place	1966 East Berlin	-67.5 kg
Bronze medal – third place	1968 Mexico City	-67.5 kg
European Championships
Bronze medal – third place	1956 Helsinki	-60 kg
Bronze medal – third place	1957 Katowice	-67.5 kg
Gold medal – first place	1959 Warsaw	-60 kg
Gold medal – first place	1960 Milan	-67.5 kg
Bronze medal – third place	1961 Vienna	-67.5 kg
Bronze medal – third place	1962 Budapest	-67.5 kg
Gold medal – first place	1963 Stockholm	-67.5 kg
Silver medal – second place	1966 East Berlin	-67.5 kg
Silver medal – second place	1968 Leningrad	-67.5 kg

Marian Zieliński (24 December 1929 – 13 October 2005) was a Polish weightlifter. He competed at the 1956, 1960, 1964 and 1968 Olympics and won bronze medals in 1956, 1964 and 1968, placing fourth in 1960. He held the world and European titles in 1959 and 1963. Zieliński set three ratified world records: two in the snatch in 1958 and one in the clean and jerk in 1964.

Zieliński took up weightlifting in the early 1950s, and retired in 1970. He then coached weightlifters until 1978, and after that worked as a painter, sculptor and jeweler. He was married to Jadwiga Nienartowicz and had two sons, Andrzej (born 1958) and Mark (born 1960), both live in Canada.
