= Yoshiyuki Miyake =

Japanese weightlifter (born 1945)

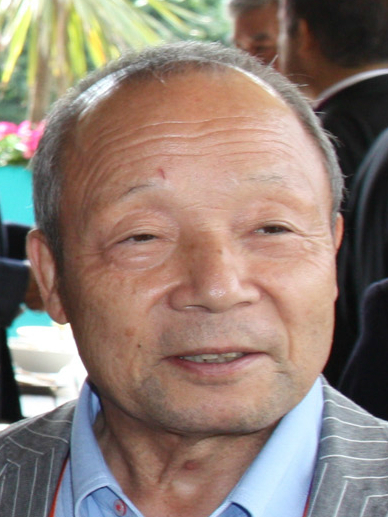

Personal information
- Born: 30 September 1945 (age 80)

Sport
- Country: Japan
- Sport: Weightlifting
Medal record
Men's weightlifting
Representing Japan
Bronze medal – third place	1968 Mexico City	60kg
World Championships
Bronze medal – third place	1965 Tehran	-56 kg
Bronze medal – third place	1966 East Berlin	-60 kg
Bronze medal – third place	1968 Mexico City	-60 kg
Gold medal – first place	1969 Warsaw	-60 kg
Gold medal – first place	1971 Lima	-60 kg
Asian Games
Gold medal – first place	1970 Bangkok	-60 kg

Yoshiyuki Miyake (三宅義行, Miyake Yoshiyuki; born 30 September 1945) is a Japanese former weightlifter who won a bronze medal in 1968 Summer Olympics, bronze medals in the 1965, 1966, and 1968 World Championships, gold medals in the 1969 and 1971 World Championships, and the 1970 Asian Games. At the 2012 Summer Olympics, his daughter Hiromi Miyake won a silver medal in Weightlifting in the 48kg category.

He is a retired Japan Ground Self-Defense Force Colonel. Olympic and world champion weightlifter Yoshinobu Miyake is his brother.
