= Ireneusz Paliński =

Polish weightlifter (1932–2006)

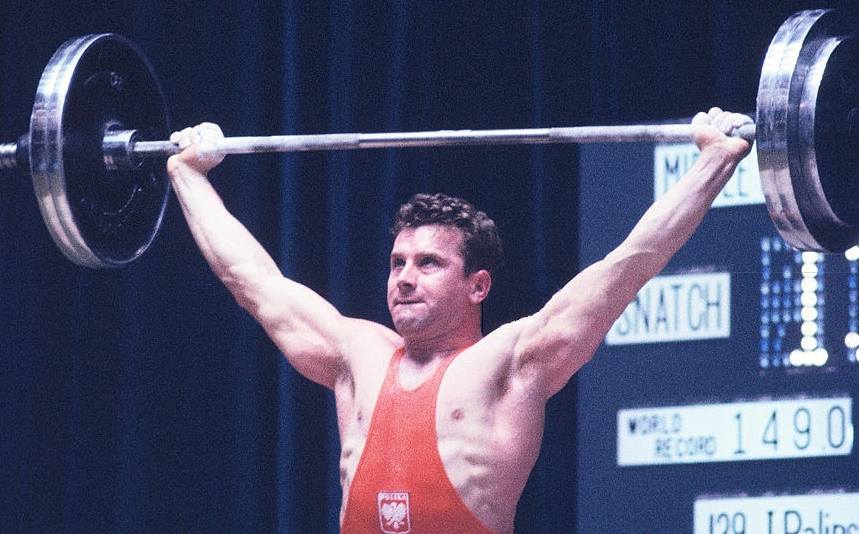
- Ireneusz Paliński at the 1964 Olympics

Personal information
- Born: 13 May 1932 Nużewo, Poland
- Died: 9 July 2006 (aged 74) Warsaw, Poland
- Height: 1.81 m (5 ft 11 in)
- Weight: 83–90 kg (183–198 lb)

Sport
- Sport: Weightlifting
- Club: Gwaria Jelenia Góra; LZS Mazowsze
Medal record
Men's athletics
Representing Poland
Event	1st	2nd	3rd
Olympic Games	1	0	1
World Championships	1	4	2
Total	2	4	3
Olympic Games
Gold medal – first place	1960 Rome	-82.5 kg
Bronze medal – third place	1964 Tokyo	-90 kg
World Championships
Gold medal – first place	1961 Vienna	-90 kg
Silver medal – second place	1959 Warsaw	-82.5 kg
Silver medal – second place	1962 Budapest	-90 kg
Silver medal – second place	1963 Stockholm	-90 kg
Silver medal – second place	1966 East Berlin	-90 kg
Bronze medal – third place	1958 Stockholm	-82.5 kg
Bronze medal – third place	1964 Tokyo	-90 kg

Ireneusz Paliński (13 May 1932 – 9 July 2006) was the first Polish weightlifter to win an Olympic gold medal, which he did in 1960. In 1961, he won the middle-heavyweight world title, setting new world records in the clean and jerk and in the total. For these achievements in the same year he was awarded the Order of Polonia Restituta and selected as Polish Sportsperson of the Year. He finished second at the world championships in 1959, 1962–63 and 1966, and third in 1958 and 1964. In total Paliński set six world records in the clean and jerk, which was his favorite event. Domestically, he won nine national titles.

== Early life and education ==
Paliński was the oldest of seven brothers born into a poor family. He graduated from a technical university and was a wood craftsman by profession. He took weightlifting while serving in the army. In 1965, he married Zofia Drozdowska, a teacher 13 years his junior. They had two sons, Peter and Adam. Paliński became seriously ill in the early 1990s and had several stomach operations. He died on 9 July 2006, aged 74.
