= Ihor Brovko =

Ukrainian footballer

Personal information
- Full name: Ihor Stepanovych Brovko
- Date of birth: 13 August 1992 (age 34)
- Place of birth: Ukraine
- Height: 1.80 m (5 ft 11 in)
- Position: Midfielder

Youth career
- 2005–2006: Dynamo Kyiv
- 2006–2007: FC Vidradnyi Kyiv
- 2008–2012: Arsenal Kyiv

Senior career*
Years	Team	Apps	(Gls)
2012–2013	Arsenal Kyiv	1	(0)
2014	Hoverla Uzhhorod	0	(0)
2015–2016	Arsenal Kyiv	6	(1)
2012–2013	Arsenal Bila Tserkva	11	(1)
2012–2013	Skala Stryi	26	(0)
2017	Kolkheti Poti	15	(3)
2019	Nyva Ternopil	10	(2)

International career
2010	Ukraine-19	2	(0)
- * Club domestic league appearances and goals as of 22:46, 25 December 2022 (UTC)

Ihor Brovko (Ukrainian: Ігор Степанович Бровко; born 13 August 1992) is a professional Ukrainian footballer, who plays as a midfielder.

Brovko is product of different the Kyiv's Youth Sportive Schools. He made his debut for FC Arsenal Kyiv in the Ukrainian Premier League played in the game against FC Metalist Kharkiv on 10 March 2013.
