= Eduard Brovko =

Soviet weightlifter (1936–1998)

Personal information
- Born: 25 January 1936 (age 90) Dnipropetrovsk, Ukrainian SSR, Soviet Union
- Died: 1998 (aged 61–62)

Sport
- Country: Soviet Union
- Sport: Weightlifting
- Weight class: 90 kg
- Team: National team
Medal record
Men's Weightlifting
Representing Soviet Union
World Championships
Bronze medal – third place	1963 Stockholm	90 kg
- Updated on 6 October 2016

Eduard Brovko (25 January 1936 Dnepropetrovsk, April 13, 1998, Dnepropetrovsk) was a Soviet male weightlifter, who competed in the middle heavyweight class and represented Soviet Union at international competitions. He won the bronze medal at the 1963 World Weightlifting Championships in the 90 kg category and the World (1963). Honored Master of Sports of the USSR (1966). Honored Trainer of the USSR (1979).

== Biography ==
Eduard Brovko was born on January 25, 1936, in Dnepropetrovsk. He began to do weightlifting under the leadership of Zinovy Arkhangorodsky. In 1961—1966 he was one of the leading Soviet light heavy athletes, three times became the champion of the USSR and twice the silver medalist of the championships of the country. In 1963, he participated in the World and European Championships in Stockholm and won the bronze medals of these competitions.

In 1964 he graduated from the National University of Ukraine on Physical Education and Sport. After completing his sports career, for many years he was the head coach of the Dnipropetrovsk Oblast in weightlifting and headed the regional federation in this sport. Among his most famous students are Olympic champion Sultan Rakhmanov.

== Death ==
Eduard Brovko died on April 13, 1998, and was buried in Dnepropetrovsk.
