= Aleksandr Kidyayev =

Soviet weightlifter (born 1940)

Personal information
- Born: 1940 (age 85–86)

Sport
- Sport: Weightlifting
Medal record
Representing the Soviet Union
World Championships
Silver medal – second place	1965 Tehran	-82.5 kg
European Championships
Gold medal – first place	1965 Sofia	-82.5 kg

Aleksandr Kidyayev (Russian: Александр Кидяев, born 1940) is a retired Soviet light-heavyweight weightlifter. He won a silver medal at the 1965 World Championships and set a world record in the press in 1968.
