= Joseph Dube =

American weightlifter (1944–2025)

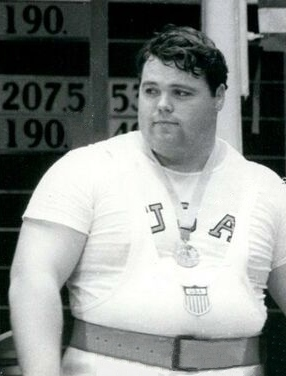
- Dube at the 1968 Olympics

Personal information
- Full name: Joseph Douglas Dube
- Born: February 15, 1944 Altha, Florida, U.S.
- Died: September 8, 2025 (aged 81)
- Height: 183 cm (6 ft 0 in)
- Weight: 146 kg (322 lb)

Sport
- Sport: Weightlifting
- Club: York Barbell Club
- Coached by: Dick Smith

Achievements and titles
- Personal best(s): Total – 591 kg (1,300 lbs); Press – 210 kg (463 lbs); Snatch – 167 kg (369 lbs); Clean&Jerk – 215 kg (474 lbs)
Medal record
Representing United States
Olympic Games
Bronze medal – third place	1968 Mexico City	+90 kg
World Championships
Bronze medal – third place	1968 Mexico City	+90 kg
Gold medal – first place	1969 Warsaw	+110 kg
Pan American Games
Gold medal – first place	1967 Winnipeg	+90 kg
World's Strongest Man
7th	1979 World's Strongest Man

Joseph Douglas Dube (February 15, 1944 – September 8, 2025) was an American weightlifter, world champion, Olympic Games medalist and strongman competitor. He won a bronze medal at the 1968 Summer Olympics, and set two world records in the clean and press the same year. As of 2025, he is still the last senior male American weightlifter to win the world title in weightlifting, which he achieved in 1969.

== Biography ==
Dube was born on February 15, 1944. He took up weightlifting in 1958, together with his elder brother Virgil. He learned the technique by reading weightlifting magazines and talking to Paul Anderson and his coach Dick Smith. He stopped competing from 1972 to 1979 due to an injury to the left elbow. He won the America's Cup in Honolulu in 1980, and retired in January 1982. In 1996 he had a total hip replacement.

Between 1962 and 1996, Dube worked for an insurance company based in Jacksonville, Florida.

Dube died on September 8, 2025, at the age of 81.

== Legacy ==
Dube was a guest of President Richard Nixon at the White House. He also appeared on The Tonight Show Starring Johnny Carson. He is mentioned briefly in the novel The Book of Air and Shadows, whose fictional protagonist is said to have competed in the 1968 Olympics.

Dube was an accomplished visual artist and has work on display with the Art of the Olympians. He is a member of the U.S. Weightlifting Hall of Fame.
