= Hans Zdražila =

Czech weightlifter

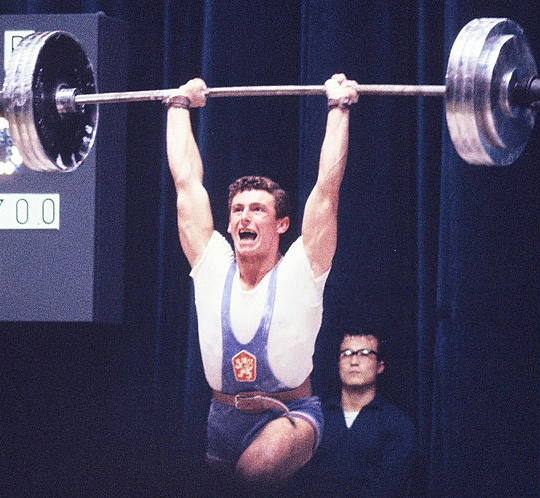
- Zdražila at the 1964 Olympics

Personal information
- Born: 3 October 1941 (age 84) Moravská Ostrava, Protectorate of Bohemia and Moravia
- Height: 1.69 m (5 ft 7 in)

Sport
- Sport: Weightlifting
Medal record
Representing Czechoslovakia
Olympic Games
Gold medal – first place	1964 Tokyo	-75 kg
World Championships
Bronze medal – third place	1963 Stockholm	-75 kg
Gold medal – first place	1964 Tokyo	-75 kg
Bronze medal – third place	1966 Berlin	-82.5 kg

Hans Zdražila (born 3 October 1941) is a retired Czechoslovak weightlifter who won a gold medal at the 1964 Summer Olympics setting a world record in the 75 kg weight category. By the next Games he moved to the heavier 82.5 kg division and finished sixth. At the world championships he won two bronze medals, in 1963 and 1966.
