= Yoshinobu Miyake =

Japanese weightlifter (born 1939)

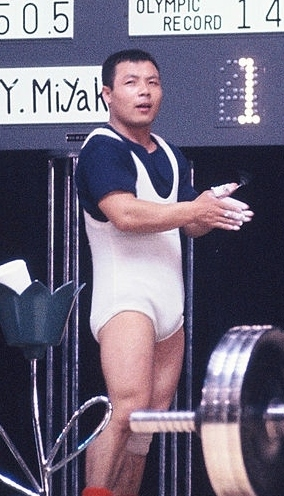
- Yoshinobu Miyake at the 1964 Olympics

Personal information
- Born: 24 November 1939 (age 86) Murata, Miyagi, Japan
- Education: Hosei University
- Height: 1.54 m (5 ft 1 in)
- Weight: 56–60 kg (123–132 lb)

Sport
- Sport: Weightlifting
Medal record
Representing Japan
Olympic Games
| Silver medal – second place | 1960 Rome | -56 kg |
| Gold medal – first place | 1964 Tokyo | -60 kg |
| Gold medal – first place | 1968 Mexico City | -60 kg |
World Championships
| Bronze medal – third place | 1961 Vienna | -56 kg |
| Gold medal – first place | 1962 Budapest | -56 kg |
| Gold medal – first place | 1963 Stockholm | -60 kg |
| Gold medal – first place | 1964 Tokyo | -60 kg |
| Gold medal – first place | 1965 Tehran | -60 kg |
| Gold medal – first place | 1966 East Berlin | -60 kg |
| Gold medal – first place | 1968 Mexico City | -60 kg |
Asian Games
| Gold medal – first place | 1966 Bangkok | -60 kg |

Yoshinobu Miyake (三宅 義信, Miyake Yoshinobu; born November 24, 1939) is a retired Japanese weightlifter and Japan Ground Self-Defense Force Lieutenant. He won one silver and two gold medals at the 1960, 1964 and 1968 Olympics and finished fourth in 1972. He also won world titles in 1962, 1963 and 1965–66. Between 1959 and 1969 Miyake set 25 official world records, including 10 consecutive records in the snatch and nine consecutive records in the total. In 1993 he was inducted into the International Weightlifting Federation Hall of Fame.

Miyake was known for his signature "frog style" or "Miyake pull" lifting technique, in which he kept his heels together with knees spread outward to about 60 degrees with a wide grip on the bar, resembling a frog.

After retiring from competitions Miyake coached the national weightlifting team. His brother Yoshiyuki Miyake and niece Hiromi Miyake also won Olympic medals in weightlifting. All three were shorter than 1.56 m (5 ft 2 in).

Miyake was one of the flagbearers for Japan in the opening ceremony of the 2020 Olympics.
