= Waldemar Baszanowski =

Polish weightlifter (1935–2011)

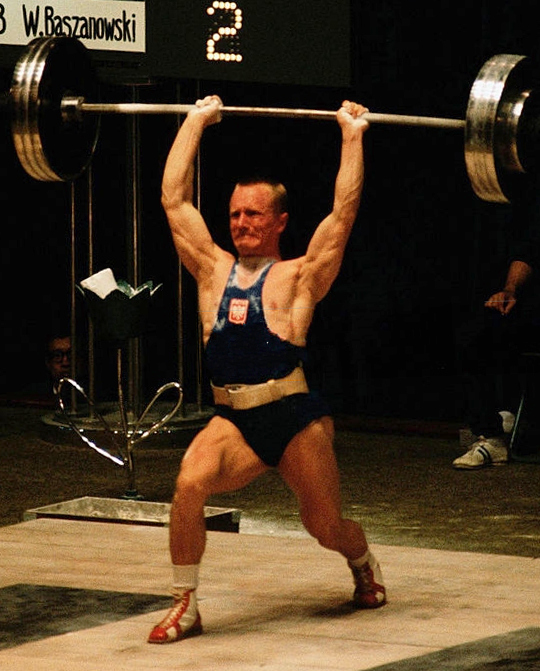
- Baszanowski at the 1964 Olympics

Personal information
- Born: 15 August 1935 Grudziądz, Poland
- Died: 29 April 2011 (aged 75) Warsaw, Poland
- Height: 1.65 m (5 ft 5 in)
- Weight: 64–67 kg (141–148 lb)

Sport
- Sport: Weightlifting
- Club: AZS Warszawa
Medal record
Men's weightlifting
Representing Poland
Event	1st	2nd	3rd
Olympic Games	2	0	0
World Championships	5	5	0
European Championships	0	0	0
Total	8	7	0
Olympic Games
Gold medal – first place	1964 Tokyo	-67.5 kg
Gold medal – first place	1968 Mexico City	-67.5 kg
World Championships
Gold medal – first place	1961 Vienna	-67.5 kg
Gold medal – first place	1964 Tokyo	-67.5 kg
Gold medal – first place	1965 Tehran	-67.5 kg
Gold medal – first place	1968 Mexico	-67.5 kg
Gold medal – first place	1969 Warsaw	-67.5 kg
Silver medal – second place	1962 Budapest	-67.5 kg
Silver medal – second place	1963 Stockholm	-67.5 kg
Silver medal – second place	1966 Budapest	-75 kg
Silver medal – second place	1970 Columbus	-67.5 kg
Silver medal – second place	1971 Lima	-67.5 kg

Waldemar Romuald Baszanowski (15 August 1935 – 29 April 2011) was a Polish lightweight (-67.5 kg) weightlifter. In 1969, he was chosen the Polish Sportspersonality of the Year.

== Biography ==
Baszanowski was born in Grudziądz on 15 August 1935. A month after his 25th birthday he competed for the World Championships in his sport. He became over the course of the next ten years the most decorated lightweight weightlifter at international level in the first century of its widespread competition, the 20th century.

Baszanowski set 24 world and 61 national records. He won gold medals at the 1964 and 1968 Olympics, five world championships and five silver medals, giving him a total of 10 medals, more than any weightlifter in history (to date).

His first wife Anita was killed in a car accident in 1969, 8 July, in which he was the driver; Baszanowski and his son survived.

In 1993 Baszanowski was inducted into the International Weightlifting Federation Hall of Fame. In 1999, he became the President of the European Weightlifting Federation.

In 2007, Baszanowski fell off a tree in his garden, broke his back and was paralyzed from the neck down. After four years of immobility, he died in Warsaw at the age of 75 on 29 April 2011. He is buried at the Służew New Cemetery.

Olympic Games
Preceded by Teodor Kocerka	Flagbearer for Poland; 1964 Tokyo, 1968 Mexico City, 1972 Munich	Succeeded by Grzegorz Śledziewski
