= Louis Martin (weightlifter) =

British weightlifter

Personal information
- Born: 11 November 1936 Kingston, Jamaica
- Died: 16 January 2015 (aged 78) Heanor, Derbyshire, England
- Height: 1.75 m (5 ft 9 in)
- Weight: 90 kg (198 lb)

Sport
- Sport: Weightlifting
Medal record
Representing Great Britain
Olympic Games
Bronze medal – third place	1960 Rome	-90 kg
Silver medal – second place	1964 Tokyo	-90 kg
World Championships
Gold medal – first place	1959 Warsaw	-90 kg
Silver medal – second place	1961 Austria	-90 kg
Gold medal – first place	1962 Budapest	-90 kg
Gold medal – first place	1963 Stockholm	-90 kg
Silver medal – second place	1964 Tokyo	-90 kg
Gold medal – first place	1965 Tehran	-90 kg
European Championships
Gold medal – first place	1959 Warsaw	-90 kg
Silver medal – second place	1961 Vienna	-90 kg
Gold medal – first place	1962 Budapest	-90 kg
Gold medal – first place	1963 Stockholm	-90 kg
Gold medal – first place	1965 Sofia	-90 kg
Representing England
Commonwealth Games
Gold medal – first place	1962 Perth	-90 kg
Gold medal – first place	1966 Kingston	-90 kg
Gold medal – first place	1970 Edinburgh	-90 kg

Louis George Martin (11 November 1936 – 16 January 2015) was a British middle-heavyweight weightlifter.

== Biography ==
Martin was born in Kingston, Jamaica, where he did some bodybuilding. In the mid-1950s he moved to the United Kingdom and started training in weightlifting.

At the 1958 Commonwealth Games he still represented Jamaica, but the next year he won a world title while competing for Great Britain. At the Summer Olympics, he won a bronze medal in 1960 and a silver medal in 1964; he failed in the last (clean and jerk) event in 1968. Between 1959 and 1965 he won four world and four European titles and set four world records, though only two became official.

He represented England and won a gold medal in the middle heavyweight division, at the 1962 British Empire and Commonwealth Games in Perth, Western Australia.

He went on to secure three consecutive gold medals at the Commonwealth Games, winning the gold in the middle heavyweight division at both the 1966 British Empire and Commonwealth Games in Kingston, Jamaica and the 1970 British Commonwealth Games in Edinburgh, Scotland.

In 2018, Martin was one of the first people to be commemorated by a plaque on Derby's walk of fame.
