= Viktor Kurentsov =

Soviet weightlifter (1941–2021)

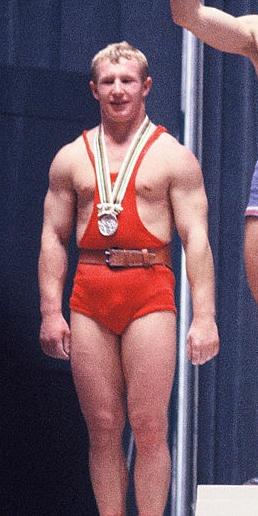
- Kurentsov at the 1964 Olympics

Personal information
- Born: 5 April 1941 Tukhinka, Syanno District, Vitebsk Region, Byelorussian SSR, Soviet Union
- Died: 7 April 2021 (aged 80) Odintsovo, Moscow Oblast, Russia
- Height: 1.64 m (5 ft 5 in)
- Weight: 75 kg (165 lb)

Sport
- Sport: Weightlifting
- Club: Soviet Army Khabarovsk/Moscow Oblast
Medal record
Representing the Soviet Union
Olympic Games
Silver medal – second place	1964 Tokyo	-75 kg
Gold medal – first place	1968 Mexico City	-75 kg
World Championships
Silver medal – second place	1964 Tokyo	-75 kg
Gold medal – first place	1965 Tehran	-75 kg
Gold medal – first place	1966 East Berlin	-75 kg
Gold medal – first place	1968 Mexico City	-75 kg
Gold medal – first place	1969 Warsaw	-75 kg
Gold medal – first place	1970 Columbus	-75 kg

Viktor Grigoryevich Kurentsov (Russian: Виктор Григорьевич Куренцов; 5 April 1941 – 7 April 2021) was a Soviet middleweight weightlifter. He competed at the 1964 and 1968 Olympics and won a silver and a gold medal, respectively.

Born in Tukhinka, Syanno District, Vitebsk Region, then part of the Byelorussian SSR, in the Soviet Union, Kurentsov started training in weightlifting aged 18, while serving in the Soviet Army in the Russian Far East. By 1964 he became the world top middleweight weightlifter, winning a silver medal at the 1964 Olympics, five world titles in 1965–1970, and seven European titles in 1964–1971. He also won silver at the 1972 European Championships and bronze in 1974. Domestically Kurentsov won nine Soviet titles (1964–70, 1972, 1974). Between 1964 and 1968 he set 18 official world records.

After ending his weightlifting career Kurentsov continued to serve in the Soviet Army, retiring in 1990 as a colonel. He then became a politician and was elected to the Odintsovo city council. Between 1993 and 1998 he worked at the Russian embassy in Italy and later at the international relations office at the Odintsovo district government.

Kurentsov died on 7 April 2021, two days after his 80th birthday.
