= Marek Gołąb =

Polish weightlifter (1940–2017)

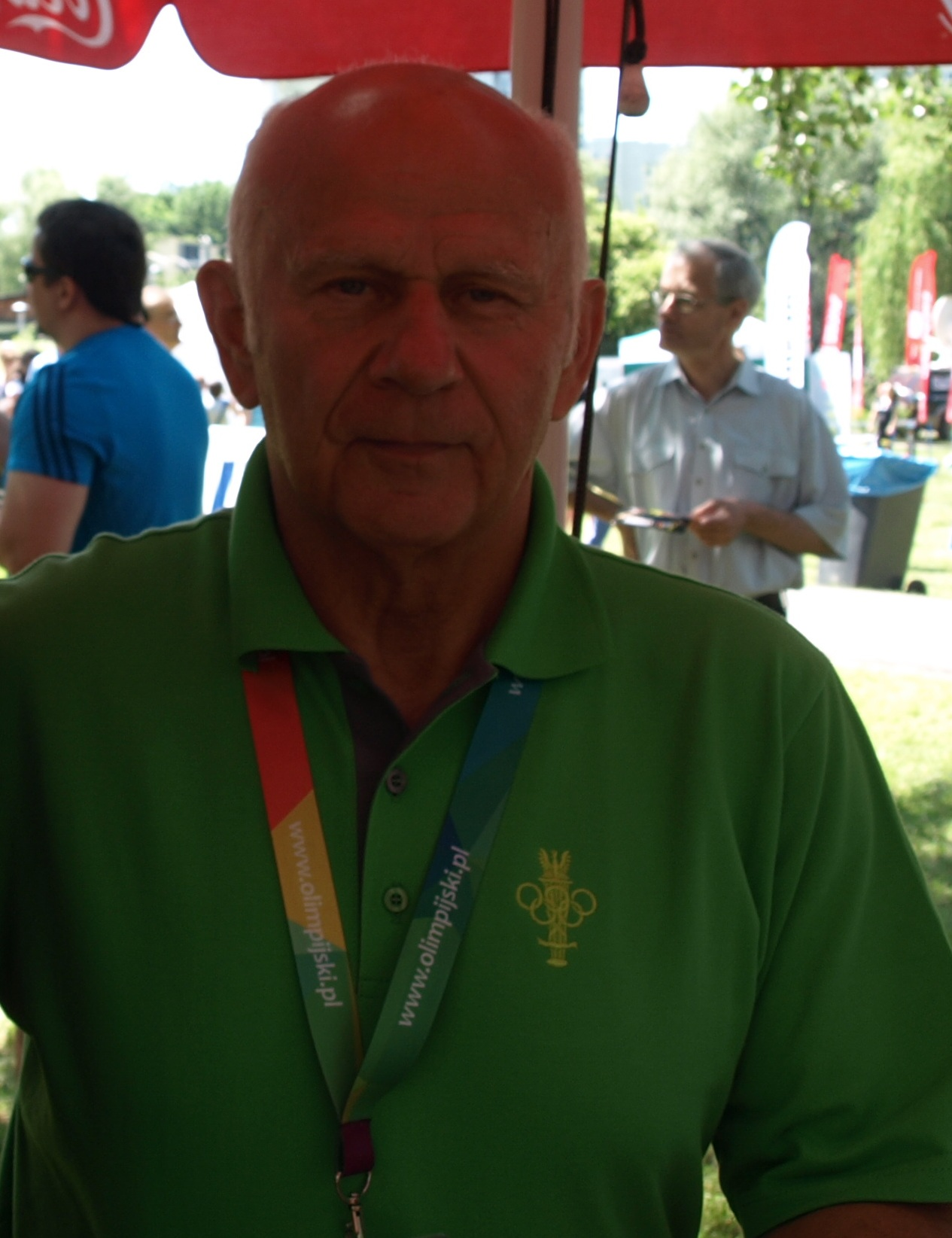
- Marek Gołąb, 2014

Medal record

Men's weightlifting

Representing Poland
Bronze medal – third place	1968 Mexico City	middle-heavyweight

Marek Gołąb (7 May 1940 in Zakliczyn – 6 October 2017 in Wrocław) was a Polish weightlifter who competed in the 1968 Summer Olympics at which he won a bronze medal in the middle-heavyweight division.
