= Vladimir Belyaev (weightlifter) =

Russian weightlifter (1940–2020)

Medal record

Men's weightlifting

Representing the Soviet Union

Olympic Games
Silver medal – second place	1968 Mexico City	-82.5 kg

Vladimir Nikolaevich Belyaev (Russian: Владимир Николаевич Беляев, September 24, 1940 – May 7, 2020) was a Russian weightlifter who competed for the Soviet Union.

Belyaev was born in Kiev on September 24, 1940. He won a silver medal at the 1968 Summer Olympics in Mexico City. Belyaev died in Kiev on May 7, 2020, at the age of 79.
