= Serge Reding =

Belgian weightlifter (1941–1975)

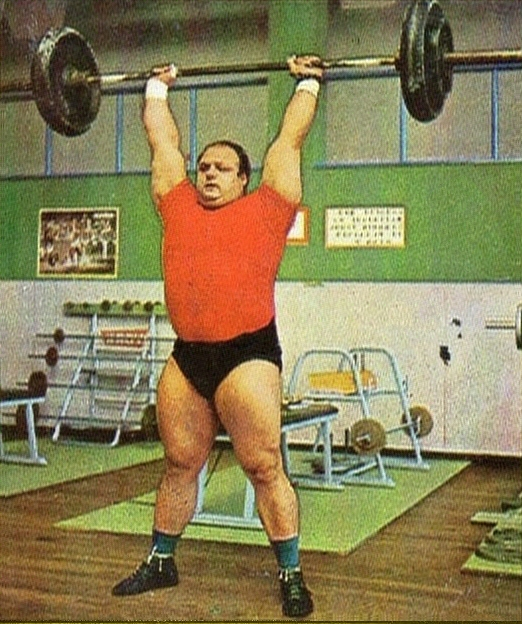

Personal information
- Nationality: Belgian
- Born: Serge Yvan Arthur Gérard; 23 December 1941 Auderghem, Belgium
- Died: 28 June 1975 (aged 33) Manila, Philippines
- Height: 1.73 m (5 ft 8 in)
- Weight: 140 kg (309 lb)

Sport
- Country: Belgium
- Sport: Weightlifting
- Event: +110 kg
Medal record
Representing Belgium
Olympic Games
Silver medal – second place	1968 Mexico City	+90 kg
World Championships
Silver medal – second place	1968 Mexico City	+90 kg
Silver medal – second place	1969 Warsaw	+110 kg
Silver medal – second place	1970 Columbus	+110 kg
Silver medal – second place	1974 Manila	+110 kg
European Championships
Bronze medal – third place	1964 Moscow	+90 kg
Silver medal – second place	1968 Leningrad	+90 kg
Gold medal – first place	1969 Warsaw	+110 kg
Bronze medal – third place	1974 Verona	+110 kg

Serge Yvan Arthur Reding (23 December 1941 – 28 June 1975) was a Belgian heavyweight weightlifter.

== Early life ==
Reding was born in Auderghem to Adeline Gérard, an unmarried woman, and his father is unknown. When his mother married Ernest Reding of Herbeumont in 1953, Serge was adopted by Reding and took his family name. Reding grew attached to his stepfather and stayed with him after he divorced from his mother.

== Career ==
He competed in the 1964, 1968, and 1972 Olympics and won a silver medal in 1968. Between 1968 and 1974 he won four silver medals at the world championships and set six ratified world records: three in press, one in snatch, and two in clean and jerk.

== Death ==
He died of a heart attack in Manila, Philippines, a year after competing in the world championships there.
