= Győző Veres =

Hungarian weightlifter (1936–2011)

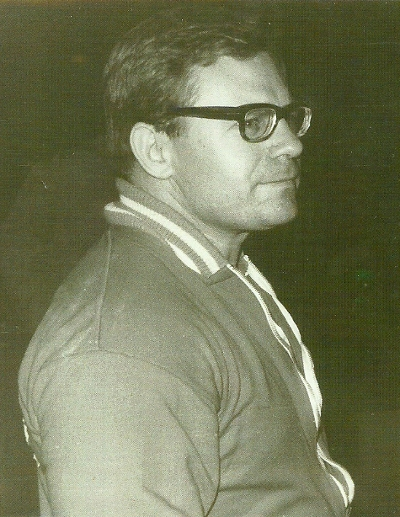

Personal information
- Nationality: Hungarian
- Born: 13 June 1936 Berekböszörmény, Hungary
- Died: 1 February 2011 (aged 74) Melbourne, Australia

Sport
- Sport: Weightlifting
Medal record
Representing Hungary
Men's weightlifting
Olympic Games
Bronze medal – third place	1960 Rome	Middleweight
Bronze medal – third place	1964 Tokyo	Light heavyweight

Győző Veres (13 June 1936 – 1 February 2011) was a Hungarian weightlifter. He was born in Berekböszörmény in Hajdú-Bihar County. He was Olympic bronze medalist in weightlifting in 1960 and 1964. He was named Hungarian Sportsman of the Year in 1963.

Awards
Preceded by Imre Polyák	Hungarian Sportsman of The Year; 1963	Succeeded by Ferenc Török
