= Károly Bakos =

Hungarian weightlifter (born 1943)

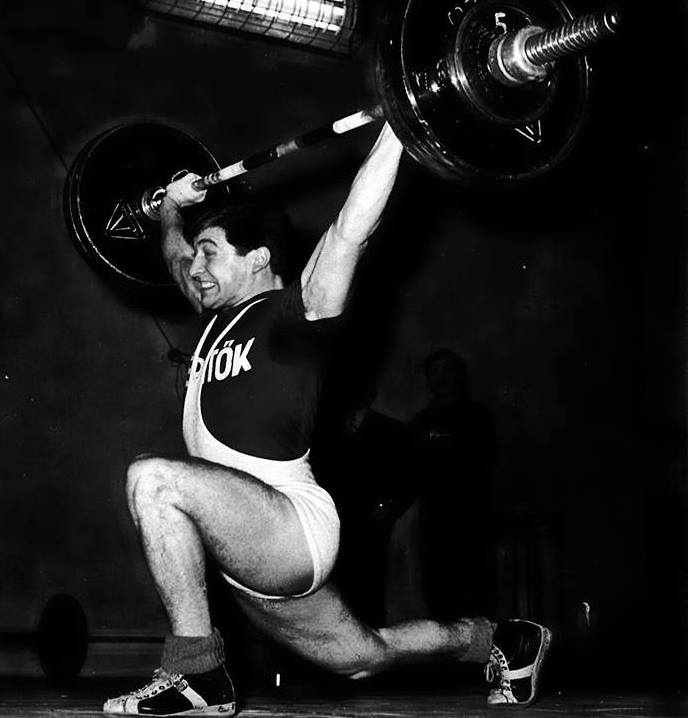

Medal record

Men's weightlifting

Representing Hungary

Olympic Games
Bronze medal – third place	1968 Mexico City	middleweight

Károly Bakos (born 2 March 1943) is a Hungarian former weightlifter who competed in the 1968 Summer Olympics. He won a bronze in the 67.5–75 kg middleweight men division.
