= Boris Selitsky =

Soviet weightlifter

Personal information
- Nationality: Russian
- Born: 22 September 1938 (age 88) Leningrad, Soviet Union

Sport
- Sport: Weightlifting
Medal record
Men's weightlifting
Representing the Soviet Union
Olympic Games
Gold medal – first place	1968 Mexico City	-82.5 kg

Boris Sergeyevich Selitsky (Russian: Борис Серге́евич Селицкий, born 22 September 1938) is a former Russian weightlifter and Olympic champion who competed for the Soviet Union.

He was born in Leningrad.

Selitsky won a gold medal at the 1968 Summer Olympics in Mexico City.
