= Dito Shanidze =

Soviet weightlifter

Medal record

Men's weightlifting

Representing the Soviet Union

Olympic Games
Silver medal – second place	1968 Mexico City	Featherweight
Silver medal – second place	1972 Munich	Featherweight

Dimit'ri "Dito" Ivanovich Shanidze (8 February 1937 – 18 November 2010) was a Soviet weightlifter. He competed and won a silver medal in the men's featherweight for both the 1968 Summer Olympics and the 1972 Summer Olympics. He was born in Derchi, Imereti, Georgia.

He was also the world champion in 1972 and 1973, a silver medallist in 1968 and 1972, and a bronze medallist in 1969. He was the European champion in 1973, a silver medallist in 1968, 1969, and 1971, and a bronze medallist in 1974.

He died in Tbilisi on 18 November 2010.
