= Mieczysław Nowak =

Polish weightlifter (1936–2006)

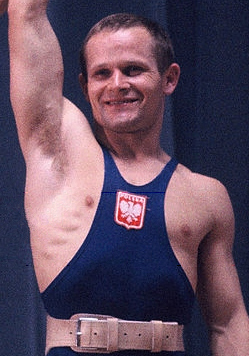
- Nowak at the 1964 Olympics

Personal information
- Born: 22 December 1936 Chomęcice, Wielkopolskie, Poland
- Died: 17 May 2006 (69) Nowy Dwór Gdański, Pomorskie, Poland
- Height: 1.60 m (5 ft 3 in)
- Weight: 60 kg (130 lb)

Sport
- Sport: Weightlifting
- Club: LZS Wrocław; Śląsk Wrocław; WKS Flota Gdynia
- Coached by: Aleksander Machowski; Augustyn Dziedzic; Klemens Roguski
Medal record
Representing Poland
Olympic Games
Bronze medal – third place	1964 Tokyo	-60 kg
World Championships
Silver medal – second place	1965 Tehran	-60 kg
Silver medal – second place	1966 East Berlin	-60 kg
Gold medal – first place	1970 Columbus	-60 kg
European Championships
Gold medal – first place	1965 Sofia	-60 kg
Gold medal – first place	1966 East Berlin	-60 kg
Gold medal – first place	1968 Leningrad	-60 kg
Silver medal – second place	1970 Szombathely	-56 kg
Bronze medal – third place	1972 Constanta	-60 kg

Mieczysław Nowak (22 December 1936 – 17 May 2006) was a Polish featherweight weightlifter. He competed at the 1964, 1968 and 1972 Olympics and finished in third, fifth and seventh place, respectively. He won one gold (1970) and two silver medals (1965 and 1966) at world championships, and his Olympic bronze also counted as the world championships bronze in 1964. At the European championships, he won three gold (1965, 1966 and 1968), one silver (1970) and 1 bronze medals (1972). Nationally he won four titles (1965–1967, 1970) and set thirteen records.

After retiring from competitions Nowak worked as a coach and a sports official.
