= Henryk Trębicki =

Polish weightlifter (1940–1996)

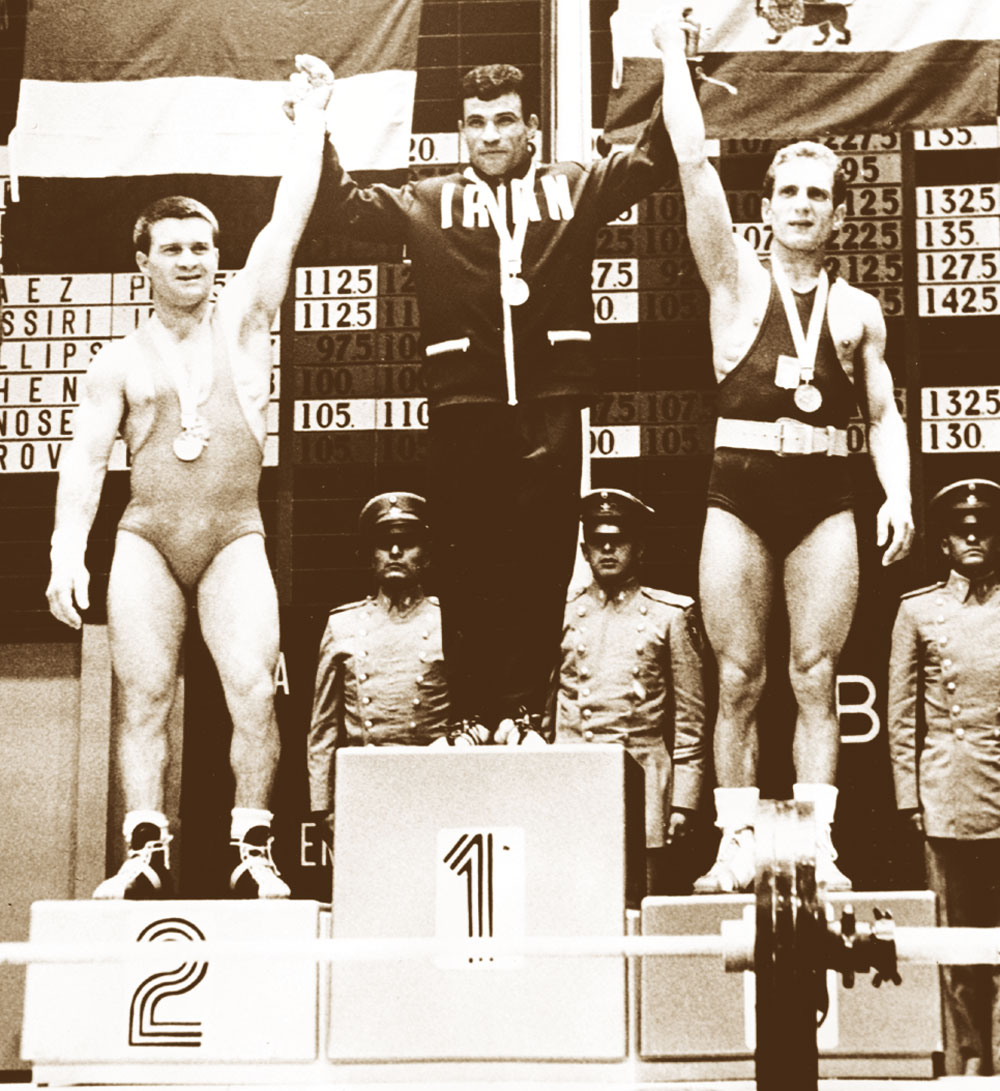
- Trębicki (right) at the 1968 Olympics

Personal information
- Born: 22 October 1940 Janowszczyzna, Poland
- Died: 8 June 1996 (aged 55) Warsaw, Poland
- Height: 159 cm (5 ft 3 in)

Sport
- Sport: Weightlifting
- Club: Ostrów Mazowiecki; Lotnika Warszawa; LZS Mazowsze
Medal record
Representing Poland
Olympic Games
Bronze medal – third place	1968 Mexico City	-56 kg
World Championships
Silver medal – second place	1971 Lima	-56 kg
European Championships
Bronze medal – third place	1965 Sofia	-56 kg

Henryk Trębicki (22 October 1940 – 8 June 1996) was a Polish bantamweight weightlifter. He competed at the 1964, 1968 and 1972 Olympics and won a bronze medal in 1968, placing fourth in 1964 and 1972. He won a silver medal at the 1971 world and a bronze medal at the 1965 European championships. He also placed third at the 1970 World Championships, but was disqualified after a positive doping test.
