= Norbert Ozimek =

Polish weightlifter (born 1945)

Olympic medal record

Men's weightlifting

Representing Poland
Silver medal – second place	1972 Munich	light-heavyweight
Bronze medal – third place	1968 Mexico City	light-heavyweight

Norbert Wojciech Ozimek (born 24 January 1945) is a Polish former weightlifter who competed in the 1968 Summer Olympics and in the 1972 Summer Olympics.
