= Géza Tóth (weightlifter) =

Hungarian weightlifter (1932–2011)

Personal information
- Born: 25 January 1932 Sorokpolány, Hungary
- Died: 4 October 2011 (aged 79) Szombathely, Hungary

Sport
- Sport: Weightlifting
Medal record
Men's weightlifter
Representing Hungary
Olympic Games
Silver medal – second place	1964 Tokyo	Light-Heavyweight

Géza Tóth (25 January 1932 – 4 October 2011) was a Hungarian weightlifter. He won a silver medal in the Men's Light-Heavyweight event at the 1964 Summer Olympics.
