= Leonid Zhabotinsky =

Ukrainian weightlifter (1938–2016)

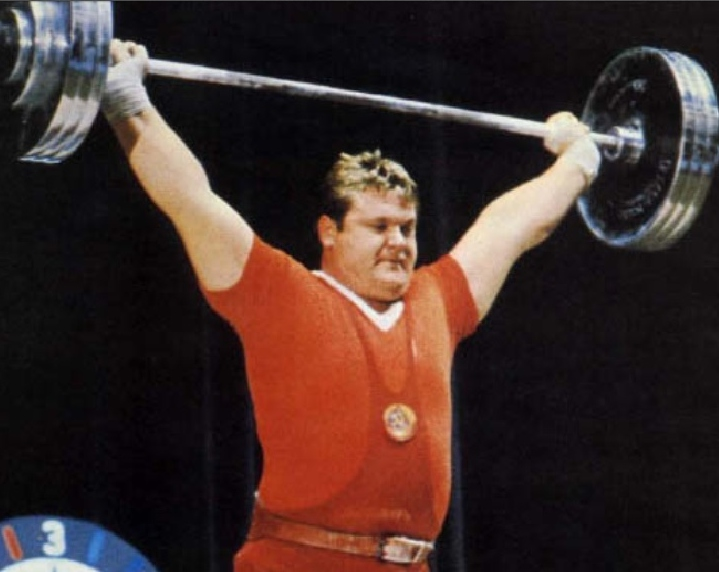
- Zhabotinsky in 1968

Personal information
- Born: 28 January 1938 Uspenka, Sumy, Ukrainian SSR, Soviet Union
- Died: 14 January 2016 (aged 77) Zaporizhzhia, Ukraine
- Height: 1.94 m (6 ft 4 in)
- Weight: 163 kg (359 lb) (1968)

Sport
- Sport: Weightlifting
- Club: Kolos; Armed Forces sports society
Medal record
Representing Soviet Union
Olympic Games
| Gold medal – first place | 1964 Tokyo | +90 kg |
| Gold medal – first place | 1968 Mexico City | +90 kg |
World Weightlifting Championships
| Bronze medal – third place | 1963 Stockholm | +90 kg |
| Gold medal – first place | 1964 Tokyo | +90 kg |
| Gold medal – first place | 1965 Teheran | +90 kg |
| Gold medal – first place | 1966 East Berlin | +90 kg |
| Gold medal – first place | 1968 Mexico City | +90 kg |
European Weightlifting Championships
| Silver medal – second place | 1963 Stockholm | +90 kg |
| Gold medal – first place | 1966 East Berlin | +90 kg |
| Gold medal – first place | 1968 Leningrad | +90 kg |
USSR Weightlifting Championships
| Silver medal – second place | 1961 Dnipropetrovsk | +110 kg |
| Silver medal – second place | 1962 Tbilisi | +110 kg |
| Silver medal – second place | 1963 Moscow | +102.5 kg |
| Gold medal – first place | 1964 Kiev | +102.5 kg |
| Gold medal – first place | 1965 Yerevan | +102.5k g |
| Gold medal – first place | 1966 Moscow | +102.5 kg |
| Gold medal – first place | 1967 Luhansk | +102.5 kg |
| Gold medal – first place | 1965 Rostov-on-Don | +110 kg |

Leonid Ivanovich Zhabotinsky (Ukrainian: Леонiд Іванович Жаботинський, Leonid Ivanovych Zhabotynskyi; 28 January 1938 – 14 January 2016) was a Ukrainian weightlifter who competed for the Soviet Union. He set 19 world records in the superheavyweight class and won gold medals at the 1964 and 1968 Olympic Games. He also set 20 Soviet Union records and 58 Ukrainian records.

== Early life ==
Zhabotinsky was born on 28 January 1938 in a village in Uspenka, Sumy Oblast, into a Ukrainian family. Although Ivan Filippovich, his father, was an athlete, Zhabotinsky stated in a 1967 interview that he took after one of his grandfathers, and neither of his parents had an outstanding physique. Zhabotinsky spent his childhood years in Zaporizhia. Zhabotinsky was making his first steps in sports at a local rural sports school. After graduating from the seven-year secondary school, he worked at the Kharkiv Tractor Plant and was coached by Mikhail Svetlichny at the local weightlifting club of the Armed Forces sports society.

== Weightlifting career ==
Zhabotinsky debuted at the Ukrainian SSR Championship in 1957, where he earned a bronze medal. Later that year, Zhabotinsky entered the Kharkiv Pedagogical Institute and studied there until 1964. He was the flag bearer for the Soviet Union during the opening ceremonies of the 1968 Summer Olympics in Mexico City, carrying the flag with one hand when the team marched in, when all the other flag bearers used two hands. Between 1963 and 1974, Zhabotinsky set 19 world records in the superheavyweight class and won gold medals at the 1964 and 1968 Olympics. He was a member of the Communist Party of the Soviet Union between 1965 and 1991.

== Personal life ==
In 1964, Zhabotinsky graduated from the Kharkiv Pedagogical Institute and in 1970 defended a PhD in pedagogy. After ending his sport career, he coached weightlifters at the Soviet Army and retired in 1991 as a colonel. In 1987–1991, he worked in Madagascar as a military consultant and weightlifting coach. After that, he became a pro-rector of the Moscow Institute of Business and Law, one of the first private higher education facilities in Russia.

Zhabotinsky was married to Raisa and had two sons, Ruslan and Vilen, both of whom have competed in weightlifting. He died on 14 January 2016, two weeks before his 78th birthday, in Zaporizhzhia, Ukraine.

Zhabotinsky was Arnold Schwarzenegger's teenage idol.
