= 1970 European Weightlifting Championships =

Sport event

1970 European Championships

The 1970 European Weightlifting Championships were held in Szombathely, Hungary from June 20 to June 28, 1970. This was the 49th edition of the event. There were 137 men in action from 21 nations.

== Medal summary ==
| Event | Gold | | Silver | | Bronze | |
52 kg
| Press | Vladislav Krishchishin; Soviet Union | 112.5 kg | Sándor Holczreiter; Hungary | 110.0 kg | Zygmunt Smalcerz; Poland | 105.0 kg |
| Snatch | Vladimir Smetanin; Soviet Union | 100.0 kg | Vladislav Krishchishin; Soviet Union | 97.5 kg | Zygmunt Smalcerz; Poland | 92.5 kg |
| Clean & Jerk | Vladislav Krishchishin; Soviet Union | 130.0 kg | Vladimir Smetanin; Soviet Union | 125.0 kg | Sándor Holczreiter; Hungary | 125.0 kg |
| Total | Vladislav Krishchishin; Soviet Union | 340.0 kg | Sándor Holczreiter; Hungary | 327.5 kg | Vladimir Smetanin; Soviet Union | 325.0 kg |
56 kg
| Press | Imre Földi; Hungary | 127.5 kg | Rafail Belenkov; Soviet Union | 112.5 kg | Atanas Kirov; Bulgaria | 112.5 kg |
| Snatch | Mieczysław Nowak; Poland | 110.0 kg | Walter Szołtysek; Poland | 107.5 kg | Karel Prohl; Czechoslovakia | 107.5 kg |
| Clean & Jerk | Mieczysław Nowak; Poland | 142.5 kg | Imre Földi; Hungary | 140.0 kg | Walter Szołtysek; Poland | 135.0 kg |
| Total | Imre Földi; Hungary | 372.5 kg | Mieczysław Nowak; Poland | 362.5 kg | Walter Szołtysek; Poland | 352.5 kg |
60 kg
| Press | Mladen Kuchev; Bulgaria | 132.5 kg | Janos Benedek; Hungary | 120.0 kg | Heinz Becker; East Germany | 120.0 kg |
| Snatch | Jan Wojnowski; Poland | 120.0 kg | Janos Benedek; Hungary | 115.0 kg | Mladen Kuchev; Bulgaria | 107.5 kg |
| Clean & Jerk | Henryk Trębicki; Poland | 145.0 kg | Giuseppe Tanti; Italy | 142.5 kg | Mladen Kuchev; Bulgaria | 142.5 kg |
| Total | Mladen Kuchev; Bulgaria | 382.5 kg | Jan Wojnowski; Poland | 377.5 kg | Janos Benedek; Hungary | 375.0 kg |
67.5 kg
| Press | János Bagócs; Hungary | 140.0 kg | Zbigniew Kaczmarek; Poland | 140.0 kg | Waldemar Baszanowski; Poland | 140.0 kg |
| Snatch | Ondrej Hekel; Czechoslovakia | 130.0 kg | Waldemar Baszanowski; Poland | 130.0 kg | János Bagócs; Hungary | 125.0 kg |
| Clean & Jerk | János Bagócs; Hungary | 167.5 kg | Zbigniew Kaczmarek; Poland | 165.0 kg | Waldemar Baszanowski; Poland | 162.5 kg |
| Total | János Bagócs; Hungary | 432.5 kg | Waldemar Baszanowski; Poland | 432.5 kg | Zbigniew Kaczmarek; Poland | 427.5 kg |
75 kg
| Press | Viktor Kurentsov; Soviet Union | 152.5 kg | Werner Dittrich; East Germany | 150.0 kg | Albert Huser; West Germany | 145.0 kg |
| Snatch | Viktor Kurentsov; Soviet Union | 137.5 kg | Werner Dittrich; East Germany | 135.0 kg | Yevgeny Smirnov; Soviet Union | 135.0 kg |
| Clean & Jerk | Gábor Szarvas; Hungary | 177.5 kg | Viktor Kurentsov; Soviet Union | 175.0 kg | Yordan Bikov; Bulgaria | 165.0 kg |
| Total | Viktor Kurentsov; Soviet Union | 465.0 kg | Gábor Szarvas; Hungary | 452.5 kg | Yevgeny Smirnov; Soviet Union | 445.0 kg |
82.5 kg
| Press | Gennady Ivanchenko; Soviet Union | 162.5 kg | Hans Bettembourg; Sweden | 162.5 kg | Norbert Ozimek; Poland | 157.5 kg |
| Snatch | Norbert Ozimek; Poland | 147.5 kg | Gennady Ivanchenko; Soviet Union | 140.0 kg | Stefan Sochanski; Poland | 140.0 kg |
| Clean & Jerk | Gennady Ivanchenko; Soviet Union | 185.0 kg | Juhani Avellan; Finland | 185.0 kg | György Horváth; Hungary | 182.5 kg |
| Total | Gennady Ivanchenko; Soviet Union | 487.5 kg | György Horváth; Hungary | 472.5 kg | Stefan Sochanski; Poland | 465.0 kg |
90 kg
| Press | Karl Arnold; East Germany | 177.5 kg | Bo Johansson; Sweden | 177.5 kg | Kaarlo Kangasniemi; Finland | 177.5 kg |
| Snatch | Kaarlo Kangasniemi; Finland | 160.0 kg | Bo Johansson; Sweden | 157.5 kg | Vasily Kolotov; Soviet Union | 157.5 kg |
| Clean & Jerk | Vasily Kolotov; Soviet Union | 200.0 kg | Pierre Gourrier; France | 192.5 kg | Kaarlo Kangasniemi; Finland | 192.5 kg |
| Total | Kaarlo Kangasniemi; Finland | 530.0 kg | Vasily Kolotov; Soviet Union | 527.5 kg | Bo Johansson; Sweden | 525.0 kg |
110 kg
| Press | Jaan Talts; Soviet Union | 195.0 kg | Aleksandar Kraychev; Bulgaria | 180.0 kg | Günther Wu; West Germany | 180.0 kg |
| Snatch | Kauko Kangasniemi; Finland | 160.0 kg | Mauno Lindroos; Finland | 155.0 kg | Jaan Talts; Soviet Union | 152.5 kg |
| Clean & Jerk | Jaan Talts; Soviet Union | 215.0 kg WR | Aleksandar Kraychev; Bulgaria | 195.0 kg | Mauno Lindroos; Finland | 192.5 kg |
| Total | Jaan Talts; Soviet Union | 562.5 kg WR | Aleksandar Kraychev; Bulgaria | 525.0 kg | Janos Hanzlik; Hungary | 517.5 kg |
+110 kg
| Press | Vasily Alekseyev; Soviet Union | 217.5 kg WR | Manfred Rieger; East Germany | 192.5 kg | Kalevi Lahdenranta; Finland | 192.5 kg |
| Snatch | Kalevi Lahdenranta; Finland | 172.5 kg | Vasily Alekseyev; Soviet Union | 170.0 kg | Manfred Rieger; East Germany | 162.5 kg |
| Clean & Jerk | Vasily Alekseyev; Soviet Union | 225.0 kg WR | Kalevi Lahdenranta; Finland | 212.5 kg | Manfred Rieger; East Germany | 210.0 kg |
| Total | Vasily Alekseyev; Soviet Union | 612.5 kg WR | Kalevi Lahdenranta; Finland | 577.5 kg | Manfred Rieger; East Germany | 565.0 kg |

== Medal table ==
Ranking by Big (Total result) medals

| Rank | Nation | Gold | Silver | Bronze | Total |
|---|---|---|---|---|---|
| 1 | Soviet Union | 5 | 1 | 2 | 8 |
| 2 | Hungary | 2 | 3 | 2 | 7 |
| 3 | Bulgaria | 1 | 1 | 0 | 2 |
| 3 | Finland | 1 | 1 | 0 | 2 |
| 5 | Poland | 0 | 3 | 3 | 6 |
| 6 | East Germany | 0 | 0 | 1 | 1 |
| 6 | Sweden | 0 | 0 | 1 | 1 |
| Totals (7 entries) | | 9 | 9 | 9 | 27 |
