= 1970 World Weightlifting Championships =

International weightlifting competition

1970 Men's World Championships

The 1970 Men's World Weightlifting Championships were held in Columbus, Ohio, United States from September 12 to September 20, 1970. There were 129 men from 28 nations in the competition.

Nine weightlifters (Sandor Holczreiter, Walter Szoltysek, Vladimir Smetanin, Imre Földi, Henryk Trebicki, Miecyslaw Nowak, Jan Wojnowski, Yoshiyuki Miyake, Janos Bagocs) test positive for amphetamines (Dexedrine) and were disqualified. The urine samples were tested using the Beckman DK-2A ratio recording ultraviolet spectrophotometer.

== Medal summary ==
Event	Gold		Silver		Bronze	
52 kg
Press	~~Sándor Holczreiter~~; ~~Hungary~~	120.0 kg	Vladislav Krishchishin; Soviet Union	112.5 kg	~~Vladimir Smetanin~~; ~~Soviet Union~~	105.0 kg
Snatch	~~Walter Szołtysek~~; ~~Poland~~	102.5 kg	~~Vladimir Smetanin~~; ~~Soviet Union~~	100.0 kg	Salvador del Rosario; Philippines	95.0 kg
Clean & Jerk	Salvador del Rosario; Philippines	130.0 kg	Charlie Depthios; Indonesia	127.5 kg	~~Walter Szołtysek~~; ~~Poland~~	127.5 kg
Total	~~Sándor Holczreiter~~; ~~Hungary~~	342.5 kg WR	~~Walter Szołtysek~~; ~~Poland~~	330.0 kg	~~Vladimir Smetanin~~; ~~Soviet Union~~	330.0 kg
56 kg
Press	~~Imre Földi~~; ~~Hungary~~	120.0 kg	Fernando Báez; Puerto Rico	115.0 kg	Mohammad Nassiri; Iran	115.0 kg
Snatch	~~Henryk Trębicki~~; ~~Poland~~	107.5 kg	Kenkichi Ando; Japan	105.0 kg	~~Imre Földi~~; ~~Hungary~~	105.0 kg
Clean & Jerk	Mohammad Nassiri; Iran	147.5 kg	~~Imre Földi~~; ~~Hungary~~	137.5 kg	Kenkichi Ando; Japan	135.0 kg
Total	Mohammad Nassiri; Iran	362.5 kg	~~Imre Földi~~; ~~Hungary~~	362.5 kg	~~Henryk Trębicki~~; ~~Poland~~	357.5 kg
60 kg
Press	Mladen Kuchev; Bulgaria	130.0 kg	~~Mieczysław Nowak~~; ~~Poland~~	127.5 kg	~~Yoshinobu Miyake~~; ~~Japan~~	120.0 kg
Snatch	~~Jan Wojnowski~~; ~~Poland~~	120.0 kg	~~Yoshiyuki Miyake~~; ~~Japan~~	117.5 kg	~~Mieczysław Nowak~~; ~~Poland~~	115.0 kg
Clean & Jerk	~~Mieczysław Nowak~~; ~~Poland~~	150.0 kg	~~Jan Wojnowski~~; ~~Poland~~	147.5 kg	János Benedek; Hungary	147.5 kg
Total	~~Mieczysław Nowak~~; ~~Poland~~	392.5 kg	~~Jan Wojnowski~~; ~~Poland~~	385.0 kg	~~Yoshiyuki Miyake~~; ~~Japan~~	382.5 kg
67.5 kg
Press	~~János Bagócs~~; ~~Hungary~~	140.0 kg	Zbigniew Kaczmarek; Poland	140.0 kg	Waldemar Baszanowski; Poland	137.5 kg
Snatch	Waldemar Baszanowski; Poland	135.0 kg	Zbigniew Kaczmarek; Poland	132.5 kg	Yusaku Ono; Japan	125.0 kg
Clean & Jerk	~~János Bagócs~~; ~~Hungary~~	167.5 kg	Zbigniew Kaczmarek; Poland	167.5 kg	Won Shin-hee; South Korea	165.0 kg
Total	Zbigniew Kaczmarek; Poland	440.0 kg	Waldemar Baszanowski; Poland	437.5 kg	~~János Bagócs~~; ~~Hungary~~	432.5 kg
75 kg
Press	Viktor Kurentsov; Soviet Union	152.5 kg	Ari Kurko; Finland	150.0 kg	Werner Dittrich; East Germany	150.0 kg
Snatch	Aimé Terme; France	142.5 kg	Leif Jenssen; Norway	142.5 kg	Mohamed Tarabulsi; Lebanon	140.0 kg
Clean & Jerk	Viktor Kurentsov; Soviet Union	180.0 kg	Gábor Szarvas; Hungary	172.5 kg	Yordan Bikov; Bulgaria	170.0 kg
Total	Viktor Kurentsov; Soviet Union	462.5 kg	Leif Jenssen; Norway	455.0 kg	Gábor Szarvas; Hungary	445.0 kg
82.5 kg
Press	Gennady Ivanchenko; Soviet Union	165.0 kg	Norbert Ozimek; Poland	160.0 kg	György Horváth; Hungary	157.5 kg
Snatch	Gennady Ivanchenko; Soviet Union	150.0 kg	David Rigert; Soviet Union	147.5 kg	Masushi Ouchi; Japan	145.0 kg
Clean & Jerk	Gennady Ivanchenko; Soviet Union	190.0 kg	Norbert Ozimek; Poland	182.5 kg	Mike Karchut; United States	182.5 kg
Total	Gennady Ivanchenko; Soviet Union	505.0 kg WR	Norbert Ozimek; Poland	482.5 kg	David Rigert; Soviet Union	482.5 kg
90 kg
Press	Vasily Kolotov; Soviet Union	175.0 kg	Jean-Pierre Van Lerberghe; Belgium	165.0 kg	Marek Gołąb; Poland	165.0 kg
Snatch	Vasily Kolotov; Soviet Union	160.0 kg	Rainer Dörrzapf; West Germany	145.0 kg	Pierre Gourrier; France	142.5 kg
Clean & Jerk	Vasily Kolotov; Soviet Union	202.5 kg WR	Phil Grippaldi; United States	190.0 kg	Géza Tóth; Hungary	187.5 kg
Total	Vasily Kolotov; Soviet Union	537.5 kg WR	Phil Grippaldi; United States	490.0 kg	Géza Tóth; Hungary	490.0 kg
110 kg
Press	Jaan Talts; Soviet Union	200.0 kg WR	Aleksandar Kraychev; Bulgaria	187.5 kg	Bob Bednarski; United States	182.5 kg
Snatch	Kauko Kangasniemi; Finland	160.0 kg	Jaan Talts; Soviet Union	155.0 kg	Jean-Paul Fouletier; France	152.5 kg
Clean & Jerk	Jaan Talts; Soviet Union	210.0 kg	Roberto Vezzani; Italy	200.0 kg	Bob Bednarski; United States	200.0 kg
Total	Jaan Talts; Soviet Union	565.0 kg WR	Aleksandar Kraychev; Bulgaria	535.0 kg	Bob Bednarski; United States	530.0 kg
+110 kg
Press	Serge Reding; Belgium	215.0 kg	Vasily Alekseyev; Soviet Union	215.0 kg	Ken Patera; United States	207.5 kg
Snatch	Kalevi Lahdenranta; Finland	172.5 kg	Vasily Alekseyev; Soviet Union	170.0 kg	Manfred Rieger; East Germany	165.0 kg
Clean & Jerk	Vasily Alekseyev; Soviet Union	227.5 kg WR	Serge Reding; Belgium	215.0 kg	Kalevi Lahdenranta; Finland	210.0 kg
Total	Vasily Alekseyev; Soviet Union	612.5 kg	Serge Reding; Belgium	590.0 kg	Kalevi Lahdenranta; Finland	577.5 kg

== Medal table ==
Ranking by Big (Total result) medals

Rank	Nation	Gold	Silver	Bronze	Total
1	Soviet Union	5	0	2	7
2	Poland	2	4	1	7
3	Hungary	1	1	3	5
4	Iran	1	0	0	1
5	United States	0	1	1	2
6	Belgium	0	1	0	1
6	Bulgaria	0	1	0	1
6	Norway	0	1	0	1
9	Finland	0	0	1	1
9	Japan	0	0	1	1
Totals (10 entries)		9	9	9	27

Ranking by all medals: Big (Total result) and Small (Press, Snatch and Clean & Jerk)

Rank	Nation	Gold	Silver	Bronze	Total
1	Soviet Union	16	6	3	25
2	Poland	7	11	5	23
3	Hungary	5	3	7	15
4	Finland	2	1	2	5
5	Iran	2	0	1	3
6	Belgium	1	3	0	4
7	Bulgaria	1	2	1	4
8	France	1	0	2	3
9	Philippines	1	0	1	2
10	Japan	0	2	5	7
10	United States	0	2	5	7
12	Norway	0	2	0	2
13	Indonesia	0	1	0	1
13	Italy	0	1	0	1
13	Puerto Rico	0	1	0	1
13	West Germany	0	1	0	1
17	East Germany	0	0	2	2
18	Lebanon	0	0	1	1
18	South Korea	0	0	1	1
Totals (19 entries)		36	36	36	108
