= 1973 European Weightlifting Championships =

International weightlifting competition

1973 European Championships

The 1973 European Weightlifting Championships were held in Madrid, Spain from June 10 to June 18, 1973. This was the 52nd edition of the event. There were 130 men in action from 23 nations.

== Medal summary ==
Event	Gold		Silver		Bronze	
52 kg
Snatch	Lajos Szűcs; Hungary	97.5 kg	György Kőszegi; Hungary	90.0 kg	Ion Hortopan; Romania	90.0 kg
Clean & Jerk	Lajos Szűcs; Hungary	127.5 kg	György Kőszegi; Hungary	127.5 kg	Arkadiusz Lipa; Poland	125.0 kg
Total	Lajos Szűcs; Hungary	225.0 kg	György Kőszegi; Hungary	217.5 kg	Boleslav Pachol; Czechoslovakia	210.0 kg
56 kg
Snatch	Imre Földi; Hungary	110.0 kg	Georgi Todorov; Bulgaria	110.0 kg	Karel Prohl; Czechoslovakia	107.5 kg
Clean & Jerk	Atanas Kirov; Bulgaria	147.5 kg	Georgi Todorov; Bulgaria	142.5 kg	Karel Prohl; Czechoslovakia	142.5 kg
Total	Atanas Kirov; Bulgaria	255.0 kg	Georgi Todorov; Bulgaria	252.5 kg	Karel Prohl; Czechoslovakia	250.0 kg
60 kg
Snatch	Norair Nurikyan; Bulgaria	122.5 kg	János Benedek; Hungary	122.5 kg	Dito Shanidze; Soviet Union	120.0 kg
Clean & Jerk	Dito Shanidze; Soviet Union	152.5 kg	Norair Nurikyan; Bulgaria	147.5 kg	Jan Wojnowski; Poland	147.5 kg
Total	Dito Shanidze; Soviet Union	272.5 kg	Norair Nurikyan; Bulgaria	270.0 kg	János Benedek; Hungary	267.5 kg
67.5 kg
Snatch	Mukharby Kirzhinov; Soviet Union	130.0 kg	Mladen Kuchev; Bulgaria	127.5 kg	Jenö Ambrozi; Hungary	125.0 kg
Clean & Jerk	Mukharby Kirzhinov; Soviet Union	172.5 kg	Mladen Kuchev; Bulgaria	167.5 kg	Zbigniew Kaczmarek; Poland	167.5 kg
Total	Mukharby Kirzhinov; Soviet Union	302.5 kg	Mladen Kuchev; Bulgaria	295.0 kg	Zbigniew Kaczmarek; Poland	292.5 kg
75 kg
Snatch	Leif Jenssen; Norway	147.5 kg	Nedelcho Kolev; Bulgaria	145.0 kg	Valentin Mikhailov; Soviet Union	142.5 kg
Clean & Jerk	Nedelcho Kolev; Bulgaria	185.0 kg	Yordan Bikov; Bulgaria	180.0 kg	Valentin Mikhailov; Soviet Union	177.5 kg
Total	Nedelcho Kolev; Bulgaria	330.0 kg	Yordan Bikov; Bulgaria	322.5 kg	Valentin Mikhailov; Soviet Union	320.0 kg
82.5 kg
Snatch	Vladimir Ryzhenkov; Soviet Union	157.5 kg	Rumen Rusev; Bulgaria	150.0 kg	Frank Zielecke; East Germany	145.0 kg
Clean & Jerk	Vladimir Ryzhenkov; Soviet Union	195.0 kg	Rolf Milser; West Germany	190.0 kg	György Horváth; Hungary	190.0 kg
Total	Vladimir Ryzhenkov; Soviet Union	352.5 kg	Rumen Rusev; Bulgaria	335.0 kg	Frank Zielecke; East Germany	332.5 kg
90 kg
Snatch	David Rigert; Soviet Union	165.0 kg	Andon Nikolov; Bulgaria	155.0 kg	Bo Johansson; Sweden	155.0 kg
Clean & Jerk	David Rigert; Soviet Union	202.5 kg	Atanas Shopov; Bulgaria	200.0 kg	Vasily Kolotov; Soviet Union	200.0 kg
Total	David Rigert; Soviet Union	367.5 kg	Andon Nikolov; Bulgaria	352.5 kg	Atanas Shopov; Bulgaria	350.0 kg
110 kg
Snatch	Pavel Pervushin; Soviet Union	177.5 kg	Taito Haara; Finland	162.5 kg	Helmut Losch; East Germany	157.5 kg
Clean & Jerk	Pavel Pervushin; Soviet Union	222.5 kg	Helmut Losch; East Germany	205.0 kg	Dieter Westphal; West Germany	200.0 kg
Total	Pavel Pervushin; Soviet Union	400.0 kg	Helmut Losch; East Germany	362.5 kg	Dieter Westphal; West Germany	355.0 kg
+110 kg
Snatch	Vasily Alekseyev; Soviet Union	177.5 kg	Rudolf Mang; West Germany	172.5 kg	Kalevi Lahdenranta; Finland	170.0 kg
Clean & Jerk	Vasily Alekseyev; Soviet Union	240.0 kg	Stanislav Batishchev; Soviet Union	225.0 kg	Rudolf Mang; West Germany	215.0 kg
Total	Vasily Alekseyev; Soviet Union	417.5 kg	Stanislav Batishchev; Soviet Union	395.0 kg	Rudolf Mang; West Germany	387.5 kg

== Medal table ==
Ranking by Big (Total result) medals

Rank	Nation	Gold	Silver	Bronze	Total
1	Soviet Union	6	1	1	8
2	Bulgaria	2	6	1	9
3	Hungary	1	1	1	3
4	East Germany	0	1	1	2
5	Czechoslovakia	0	0	2	2
5	West Germany	0	0	2	2
7	Poland	0	0	1	1
Totals (7 entries)		9	9	9	27
