= 1973 World Weightlifting Championships =

International weightlifting competition

1973 Men's World Championships
- Host city: Havana, Cuba
- Dates: 15–23 September 1973

The 1973 Men's World Weightlifting Championships were held in Havana, Cuba from September 15 to September 23, 1973. There were 189 men from 39 nations in the competition. These were the first championships held since the elimination of the clean and press from competition.

== Medal summary ==
Event	Gold		Silver		Bronze	
52 kg
Snatch	Takeshi Horikoshi; Japan	102.5 kg	Zygmunt Smalcerz; Poland	100.0 kg	Ion Hortopan; Romania	100.0 kg
Clean & Jerk	Mohammad Nassiri; Iran	140.0 kg WR	Lajos Szűcs; Hungary	132.5 kg	Zygmunt Smalcerz; Poland	127.5 kg
Total	Mohammad Nassiri; Iran	240.0 kg WR	Lajos Szűcs; Hungary	230.0 kg	Zygmunt Smalcerz; Poland	227.5 kg
56 kg
Snatch	Koji Miki; Japan	117.5 kg WR	Georgi Todorov; Bulgaria	112.5 kg	Atanas Kirov; Bulgaria	110.0 kg
Clean & Jerk	Atanas Kirov; Bulgaria	147.5 kg	Georgi Todorov; Bulgaria	142.5 kg	Karel Prohl; Czechoslovakia	142.5 kg
Total	Atanas Kirov; Bulgaria	257.5 kg WR	Georgi Todorov; Bulgaria	255.0 kg	Koji Miki; Japan	252.5 kg
60 kg
Snatch	János Benedek; Hungary	122.5 kg	Dito Shanidze; Soviet Union	120.0 kg	Kurt Pittner; Austria	115.0 kg
Clean & Jerk	Norair Nurikyan; Bulgaria	152.5 kg	Dito Shanidze; Soviet Union	152.5 kg	Kazumasa Hirai; Japan	145.0 kg
Total	Dito Shanidze; Soviet Union	272.5 kg	Norair Nurikyan; Bulgaria	267.5 kg	Jan Wojnowski; Poland	257.5 kg
67.5 kg
Snatch	Mladen Kuchev; Bulgaria	132.5 kg	Mukharby Kirzhinov; Soviet Union	130.0 kg	Petar Yanev; Bulgaria	130.0 kg
Clean & Jerk	Mukharby Kirzhinov; Soviet Union	175.0 kg	Mladen Kuchev; Bulgaria	170.0 kg	Masao Kato; Japan	165.0 kg
Total	Mukharby Kirzhinov; Soviet Union	305.0 kg	Mladen Kuchev; Bulgaria	302.5 kg	Petar Yanev; Bulgaria	292.5 kg
75 kg
Snatch	Nedelcho Kolev; Bulgaria	147.5 kg	Peter Wenzel; East Germany	140.0 kg	Ondrej Hekel; Czechoslovakia	137.5 kg
Clean & Jerk	Nedelcho Kolev; Bulgaria	190.0 kg WR	András Stark; Hungary	177.5 kg	Peter Wenzel; East Germany	177.5 kg
Total	Nedelcho Kolev; Bulgaria	337.5 kg WR	Peter Wenzel; East Germany	317.5 kg	András Stark; Hungary	312.5 kg
82.5 kg
Snatch	Leif Jenssen; Norway	160.0 kg	Vladimir Ryzhenkov; Soviet Union	157.5 kg	Frank Zielecke; East Germany	155.0 kg
Clean & Jerk	Frank Zielecke; East Germany	192.5 kg	Vladimir Ryzhenkov; Soviet Union	192.5 kg	Stefan Sochanski; Poland	187.5 kg
Total	Vladimir Ryzhenkov; Soviet Union	350.0 kg	Frank Zielecke; East Germany	347.5 kg	Stefan Sochanski; Poland	332.5 kg
90 kg
Snatch	David Rigert; Soviet Union	165.0 kg	Andon Nikolov; Bulgaria	162.5 kg	Peter Petzold; East Germany	160.0 kg
Clean & Jerk	Vasily Kolotov; Soviet Union	202.5 kg	David Rigert; Soviet Union	200.0 kg	Peter Petzold; East Germany	197.5 kg
Total	David Rigert; Soviet Union	365.0 kg	Vasily Kolotov; Soviet Union	360.0 kg	Peter Petzold; East Germany	357.5 kg
110 kg
Snatch	Pavel Pervushin; Soviet Union	170.0 kg	Javier González; Cuba	162.5 kg	Rudolf Strejček; Czechoslovakia	157.5 kg
Clean & Jerk	Pavel Pervushin; Soviet Union	215.0 kg	Helmut Losch; East Germany	215.0 kg	Javier González; Cuba	200.0 kg
Total	Pavel Pervushin; Soviet Union	385.0 kg	Helmut Losch; East Germany	370.0 kg	Javier González; Cuba	362.5 kg
+110 kg
Snatch	Rudolf Mang; West Germany	180.0 kg	Vasily Alekseyev; Soviet Union	177.5 kg	Stanislav Batishchev; Soviet Union	175.0 kg
Clean & Jerk	Vasily Alekseyev; Soviet Union	225.0 kg	Gerd Bonk; East Germany	222.5 kg	Rudolf Mang; West Germany	220.0 kg
Total	Vasily Alekseyev; Soviet Union	402.5 kg	Rudolf Mang; West Germany	400.0 kg	Stanislav Batishchev; Soviet Union	392.5 kg

== Medal table ==
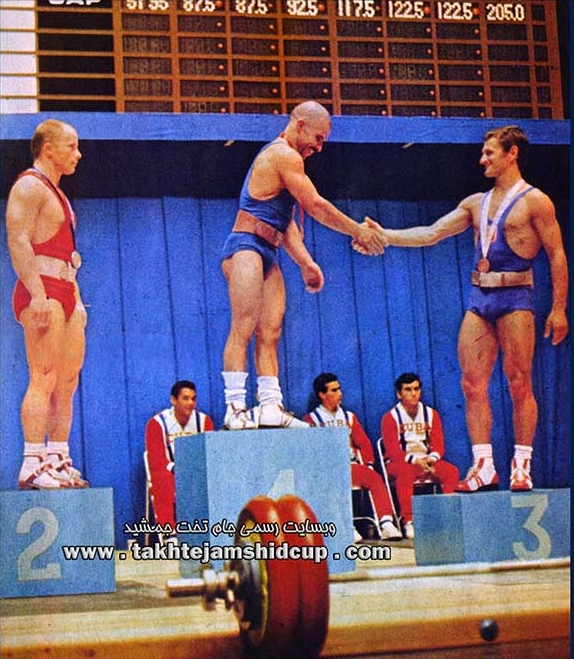
Medal winners of 52 kg. From left to right, Lajos Szűcs, Mohammad Nassiri and Zygmunt Smalcerz

Ranking by Big (Total result) medals

Rank	Nation	Gold	Silver	Bronze	Total
1	Soviet Union	6	1	1	8
2	Bulgaria	2	3	1	6
3	Iran	1	0	0	1
4	East Germany	0	3	1	4
5	Hungary	0	1	1	2
6	West Germany	0	1	0	1
7	Poland	0	0	3	3
8	Cuba	0	0	1	1
8	Japan	0	0	1	1
Totals (9 entries)		9	9	9	27

Ranking by all medals: Big (Total result) and Small (Snatch and Clean & Jerk)

Rank	Nation	Gold	Silver	Bronze	Total
1	Soviet Union	12	8	2	22
2	Bulgaria	7	7	3	17
3	Japan	2	0	3	5
4	Iran	2	0	0	2
5	East Germany	1	6	5	12
6	Hungary	1	3	1	5
7	West Germany	1	1	1	3
8	Norway	1	0	0	1
9	Poland	0	1	5	6
10	Cuba	0	1	2	3
11	Czechoslovakia	0	0	3	3
12	Austria	0	0	1	1
12	Romania	0	0	1	1
Totals (13 entries)		27	27	27	81
