= Weightlifting at the 1968 Summer Olympics – Men's +90 kg =

Weightlifting at the Olympics

Men's +90 kg at the Games of the XIX Olympiad
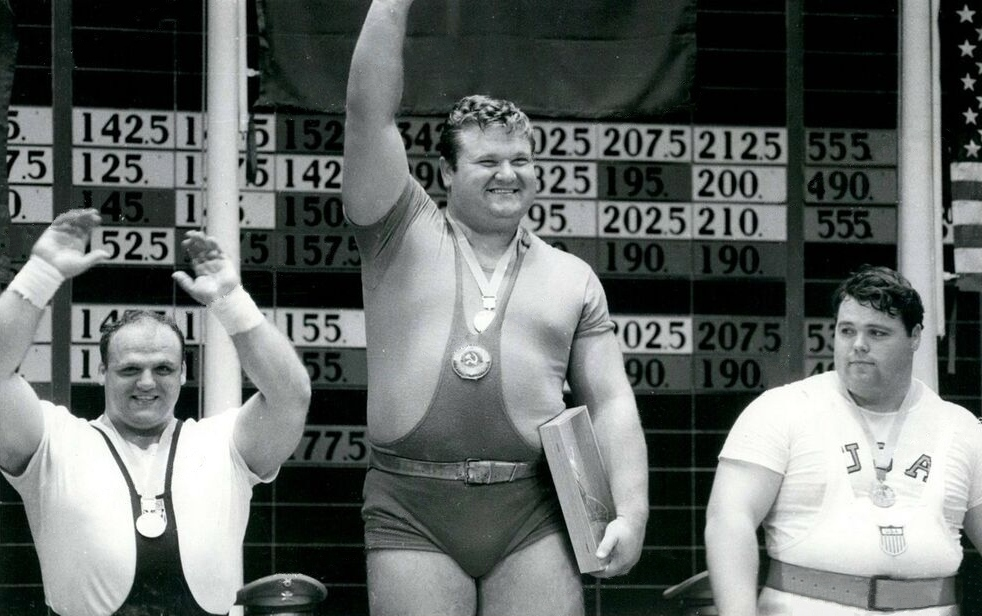
- Left-right: Reding, Zhabotinsky, Dube
- Venue: Teatro de los Insurgentes
- Date: 19 October 1968
- Competitors: 17 from 14 nations
- Winning total: 572.5 kg OR

Medalists
1st place, gold medalist(s)		Leonid Zhabotinsky	Soviet Union
2nd place, silver medalist(s)		Serge Reding	Belgium
3rd place, bronze medalist(s)		Joseph Dube	United States

The men's +90 kg weightlifting competitions at the 1968 Summer Olympics in Mexico City took place on 19 October at the Teatro de los Insurgentes. It was the eleventh appearance of the heavyweight class.

== Results ==
Rank	Name	Country	kg
1	Leonid Zhabotinsky	Soviet Union	572.5
2	Serge Reding	Belgium	555.0
3	Joseph Dube	United States	555.0
4	Manfred Rieger	East Germany	532.5
5	Rudolf Mang	West Germany	525.0
6	Mauno Lindroos	Finland	495.0
7	Kalevi Lahdenranta	Finland	492.5
8	Don Oliver	New Zealand	490.0
9	Pieter van der Kruk	Netherlands	487.5
10	Terry Perdue	Great Britain	487.5
11	Roger Levecq	France	477.5
12	Liston Sprauve	Virgin Islands	467.5
AC	Jean-Paul Fouletier	France	320.0
AC	Hwang Ho-dong	South Korea	DNF
AC	Ove Johansson	Sweden	DNF
AC	Ray Rigby	Australia	DNF
AC	Ernie Pickett	United States	DNF
