= Weightlifting at the 1972 Summer Olympics – Men's 110 kg =

Weightlifting at the Olympics

110 kg at the Games of the XX Olympiad
- Venue: Weightlifting Hall 7, Gewichtheberhalle
- Dates: 4 September 1972
- Competitors: 26 from 19 nations

Medalists
1st place, gold medalist(s)		Jaan Talts; Soviet Union
2nd place, silver medalist(s)		Aleksandar Kraychev; Bulgaria
3rd place, bronze medalist(s)		Stefan Grützner; East Germany

Total of best lifts in military press, snatch and jerk. Ties are broken by the lightest bodyweight.

== Final ==
Rank	Name	Nationality	Body weight	Military press (kg)				Snatch (kg)				Jerk (kg)				Total (kg)
Rank	Name	Nationality	Body weight	1	2	3	Result	1	2	3	Result	1	2	3	Result	Total (kg)
1st place, gold medalist(s)	Jaan Talts	Soviet Union	109.50	~~200.0~~	200.0	210.0	210.0 OR	157.5	~~165.0~~	165.0	165.0	~~205.0~~	205.0	~~225.0~~	205.0	580.0 OR
2nd place, silver medalist(s)	Aleksandar Kraychev	Bulgaria	108.40	190.0	195.0	197.5	197.5	155.0	160.0	162.5	162.5	197.5	~~202.5~~	202.5	202.5	562.5
3rd place, bronze medalist(s)	Stefan Grützner	East Germany	105.00	177.5	185.0	~~190.0~~	185.0	157.5	162.5	~~165.0~~	162.5	200.0	207.5	~~215.0~~	207.5 OR	555.0
4	Helmut Losch	East Germany	105.90	180.0	187.5	190.0	190.0	145.0	150.0	152.5	152.5	200.0	205.0	~~215.0~~	205.0	547.5
5	Roberto Vezzani	Italy	110.00	187.5	192.5	~~195.0~~	192.5	147.5	~~152.5~~	~~152.5~~	147.5	195.0	200.0	205.0	205.0	545.0
6	János Hanzlik	Hungary	109.45	185.0	190.0	~~195.0~~	190.0	152.5	157.5	~~160.0~~	157.5	~~195.0~~	195.0	~~200.0~~	195.0	542.5
7	Kauko Kangasniemi	Finland	103.90	175.0	~~180.0~~	~~180.0~~	175.0	160.0	165.0	~~167.5~~	165.0	~~197.5~~	~~197.5~~	197.5	197.5	537.5
8	Rainer Dörrzapf	West Germany	97.80	170.0	~~175.0~~	~~175.0~~	170.0	160.0	165.0	~~170.0~~	165.0	170.0	180.0	187.5	187.5	522.5
9	Rudolf Strejček	Czechoslovakia	109.70	~~177.5~~	177.5	~~182.5~~	177.5	~~145.0~~	145.0	150.0	150.0	190.0	195.0	~~197.5~~	195.0	522.5
10	Frank Capsouras	United States	101.70	~~162.5~~	162.5	170.0	170.0	142.5	150.0	~~155.0~~	150.0	190.0	200.0	~~205.0~~	200.0	520.0
11	Alan Ball	United States	108.90	155.0	162.5	167.5	167.5	152.5	162.5	~~167.5~~	162.5	180.0	185.0	-	185.0	515.0
12	Javier González	Cuba	99.75	~~165.0~~	165.0	~~170.0~~	165.0	142.5	~~147.5~~	147.5	147.5	182.5	192.5	197.5	197.5	510.0
13	Dave Hancock	Great Britain	109.90	170.0	~~175.0~~	177.5	177.5	132.5	137.5	142.5	142.5	185.0	190.0	~~197.5~~	190.0	510.0
14	Jean-Paul Fouletier	France	108.65	~~175.0~~	~~175.0~~	175.0	175.0	150.0	~~155.0~~	~~155.0~~	150.0	~~180.0~~	180.0	~~185.0~~	180.0	505.0
15	Andrés Martínez	Cuba	105.10	165.0	170.0	~~172.5~~	170.0	~~135.0~~	135.0	~~140.0~~	135.0	185.0	195.0	~~200.0~~	195.0	500.0
16	Edgar Kjerran	Norway	108.20	175.0	~~180.0~~	~~180.0~~	175.0	135.0	140.0	~~145.0~~	140.0	180.0	~~185.0~~	~~185.0~~	180.0	495.0
17	Peter Phillips	Australia	109.80	170.0	~~175.0~~	~~175.0~~	170.0	137.5	~~142.5~~	~~142.5~~	137.5	~~180.0~~	180.0	-	180.0	487.5
18	Ken Price	Great Britain	101.20	162.5	167.5	~~172.5~~	167.5	~~137.5~~	137.5	~~142.5~~	137.5	175.0	~~182.5~~	~~182.5~~	175.0	480.0
19	Óskar Sigurpálsson	Iceland	105.30	170.0	~~177.5~~	177.5	177.5	117.5	~~125.0~~	~~125.0~~	117.5	175.0	~~180.0~~	182.5	182.5	477.5
20	Pablo Juan Campos	Puerto Rico	108.30	~~155.0~~	155.0	165.0	165.0	~~125.0~~	~~125.0~~	125.0	125.0	175.0	~~182.5~~	182.5	182.5	472.5
21	Bent Harsmann	Denmark	107.35	152.5	157.5	~~162.5~~	157.5	132.5	~~140.0~~	~~140.0~~	132.5	167.5	175.0	~~180.0~~	175.0	465.0
22	Price Morris	Canada	109.60	~~155.0~~	155.0	~~165.0~~	155.0	127.5	~~137.5~~	~~137.5~~	127.5	175.0	~~180.0~~	~~180.0~~	175.0	457.5
23	Henry Phillips	Panama	103.80	150.0	157.5	~~162.5~~	157.5	122.5	127.5	132.5	132.5	165.0	~~172.5~~	~~172.5~~	165.0	455.0
-	Eivind Rekustad	Norway	109.85	~~180.0~~	~~180.0~~	180.0	180.0	~~155.0~~	~~155.0~~	~~155.0~~	NVL					DNF
-	Stancho Penchev	Bulgaria	107.55	~~190.0~~	~~190.0~~	~~190.0~~	NVL									DNF
-	Taito Haara	Finland	109.00	~~185.0~~	~~185.0~~	~~185.0~~	NVL									DNF

Key: OR = Olympic record; DNF = did not finish; NVL = no valid lift
