= Yūsaku =

- Pronunciation: jɯɯsakɯ (IPA)
- Gender: Male

Origin
- Origin: Japanese
- Meaning: Different meanings depending on the kanji used

Other names
- Alternative spelling: Yusaku (Kunrei-shiki) Yusaku (Nihon-shiki) Yūsaku, Yusaku, Yuusaku (Hepburn)

Yūsaku, Yusaku or Yuusaku is a masculine Japanese given name.

== Written forms ==
Yūsaku can be written using different combinations of kanji characters. Some examples:

- 勇作, "courage, make"
- 勇策, "courage, scheme"
- 雄作, "masculine, make"
- 雄策, "masculine, scheme"
- 祐作, "to help, make"
- 祐策, "to help, scheme"
- 友作, "friend, make"
- 友策, "friend, scheme"
- 優作, "superiority, make"
- 優策, "superiority, scheme"
- 有作, "to have, make"
- 有策, "to have, scheme"
- 悠作, "long time, make"
- 悠策, "long time, scheme"

The name can also be written in hiragana ゆうさく or katakana ユウサク.

== Notable people with the name ==
- Yusaku Igarashi (五十嵐 雄策), Japanese writer
- Yusaku Iriki (入来 祐作; born 1972), Japanese baseball player
- Yusaku Kuwazuru (桑水流 裕策; born 1985), Japanese rugby union player
- Yusaku Maezawa (前澤 友作; born 1977), Japanese businessman
- Yusaku Matsuda (松田 優作; 1949–1989), Japanese actor
- Yusaku Miyazato (宮里 優作; born 1980), Japanese golfer
- Yusaku Ono (小野 祐策; born 1947), Japanese weightlifter
- Yusaku Tanioku (谷奥 優作; born 1978), Japanese footballer
- Yusaku Uehara (上原 勇作; 1856–1933), Japanese general
- Yusaku Ueno (上野 優作; born 1973), Japanese footballer
- Yusaku Yara (屋良 有作; born 1948), Japanese actor and voice actor

== See also ==
- 79333 Yusaku, a main-belt asteroid
