= Miloslav Kolařík =

Czech weightlifter

Personal information
- Nationality: Czech
- Born: April 20, 1942; Ludkovice, Protectorate of Bohemia and Moravia, Nazi Germany
- Died: June 9, 1990

Sport
- Sport: Weightlifting

Miloslav Kolařík (20 April 1942 - 9 June 1990) was a Czech weightlifter. He competed in the men's middleweight event at the 1968 Summer Olympics.
