= Iłowo =

Iłowo may refer to the following places:

- Iłowo, Radziejów County in Kuyavian-Pomeranian Voivodeship (north-central Poland)
- Iłowo, Sępólno County in Kuyavian-Pomeranian Voivodeship (north-central Poland)
- Iłowo, West Pomeranian Voivodeship (north-west Poland)
