= Świnki =

Świnki may refer to the following places:

- Świnki, Kuyavian-Pomeranian Voivodeship (north-central Poland)
- Świnki, Lublin Voivodeship (east Poland)
- Świnki, Lubusz Voivodeship (west Poland)
