= Football at the 2013 Central American Games – Men's team squads =

== Group A ==
=== El Salvador ===
Head Coach: (El Salvador) Mauricio Alfaro

No.	Pos.	Player	Date of birth (age)	Caps	Goals	Club
1	GK	Rolando Morales	1 March 1994 (aged 19)			(El Salvador) FESA
18	GK	Wilberth Hernández	5 April 1994 (aged 18)			
17	DF	Kevin Ayala	15 July 1994 (aged 18)			(El Salvador) FESA
4	DF	Giovanni Zavaleta	27 September 1994 (aged 18)			(United States) Rush Soccer
3	DF	Bryan Bonilla	21 December 1992 (aged 20)			(United States) Rush Soccer
13	DF	Miguel Lemus	26 October 1993 (aged 19)			(El Salvador) FESA
5	DF	Alex Mejía	1 November 1994 (aged 18)			(El Salvador) FESA
15	MF	René Gómez	8 January 1993 (aged 20)			(El Salvador) FESA
16	MF	Melvin Alfaro	6 March 1993 (aged 19)			(El Salvador) FESA
12	MF	Kevin Barahona	1 October 1994 (aged 18)			(United States) Rush Soccer
10	MF	Diego Coca	26 August 1994 (aged 18)			(United States) Rush Soccer
8	MF	José Villavicencio	24 January 1995 (aged 18)			(El Salvador) FESA
11	MF	Alexander Suazo	5 January 1994 (aged 19)			(El Salvador) UES
9	FW	José Peña	10 December 1994 (aged 18)			(El Salvador) FESA
20	FW	Roberto González	25 March 1993 (aged 19)			(El Salvador) Santa Tecla
14	FW	Rommel Mejía	4 February 1994 (aged 19)			(El Salvador) Dragón
7	FW	Jairo Henríquez	31 August 1993 (aged 19)			(El Salvador) FESA

== Group B ==
=== Honduras ===
Head coach: Carlos Ramon Tabora

No.	Pos.	Player	Date of birth (age)	Caps	Club
1	GK	Edrick Menjívar	1 March 1993 (aged 20)		(Honduras) Olimpia
2	DF	Lesvin Medina	26 August 1993 (aged 19)		(Honduras) Olimpia
3	DF	José Barralaga	22 December 1994 (aged 18)		(Honduras) Real Sociedad
4	MF	Kevin Espinoza	21 April 1993 (aged 19)		(Honduras) Marathón
5	DF	Allans Vargas	25 September 1993 (aged 19)		(Honduras) Real España
6	MF	Bryan Acosta	24 November 1993 (aged 19)		(Honduras) Real España
7	MF	Óscar Salas	8 December 1993 (aged 19)		(Honduras) Olimpia
8	MF	Marvin Barrios	22 February 1994 (aged 19)		(Honduras) Motagua
9	FW	Bryan Róchez	1 January 1995 (aged 18)		(Honduras) Real España
10	MF	José Escalante	29 May 1995 (aged 17)		(Honduras) Olimpia
11	FW	Marlon Ramírez	17 April 1994 (aged 18)		(Honduras) Vida
12	GK	Luis López	13 September 1993 (aged 19)		(Honduras) Real España
14	MF	Kevin Johnson	11 September 1995 (aged 17)		(Honduras) Platense
15	DF	Rodolfo Espinal	24 February 1993 (aged 20)		(Honduras) Vida
17	MF	Jhow Benavídez	26 December 1995 (aged 17)		(Honduras) Real España
18	FW	Leonardo Benedit	15 October 1993 (aged 19)		(Honduras) Vida
19	FW	Júnior Lacayo	19 August 1995 (aged 17)		(Honduras) Victoria
20	MF	Ramón Amador	23 January 1994 (aged 19)		(Honduras) Motagua
