= Hanzlík =

Hanzlík (feminine Hanzlíková) is a Czech surname. Notable people with this name include:

- Bill Hanzlik (born 1957), American basketball player and coach
- Daniel Hanslik (born 1996), German footballer
- Jan Hanzlík (born 1982), Czech ice hockey player
- János Hanzlik (born 1943), Czech weightlifter
- Jaromír Hanzlík (born 1948), Czech actor
- Jiří Hanzlík (born 1974), Czech ice hockey player
- Michaela Lucie Hanzlíková, Czech figure skater
- Steffi Hanzlik, German skeleton racer

== See also ==
- 3257 Hanzlík, a main belt asteroid
