= Weightlifting at the 1968 Summer Olympics – Men's 75 kg =

Weightlifting at the Olympics

Men's 75 kg at the Games of the XIX Olympiad
- Venue: Teatro de los Insurgentes
- Date: 16 October 1968
- Competitors: 20 from 17 nations
- Winning total: 475.0 kg OR

Medalists
1st place, gold medalist(s)		Viktor Kurentsov	Soviet Union
2nd place, silver medalist(s)		Masashi Ohuchi	Japan
3rd place, bronze medalist(s)		Károly Bakos	Hungary

The men's 75 kg weightlifting competitions at the 1968 Summer Olympics in Mexico City took place on 16 October at the Teatro de los Insurgentes. It was the eleventh appearance of the middleweight class.

== Results ==
Rank	Name	Country	kg
1	Viktor Kurentsov	Soviet Union	475.0
2	Masashi Ohuchi	Japan	455.0
3	Károly Bakos	Hungary	440.0
4	Russell Knipp	United States	437.5
5	Lee Chun-sik	South Korea	437.5
6	Werner Dittrich	East Germany	435.0
7	Miloslav Kolařík	Czechoslovakia	430.0
8	Fred Lowe	United States	430.0
9	Rolf Maier	France	425.0
10	Sadahiro Miwa	Japan	425.0
11	Albert Huser	West Germany	410.0
12	René Gómez	Cuba	407.5
13	Luiz de Almeida	Brazil	407.5
14	Leif Jenssen	Norway	405.0
15	Abel López	Cuba	405.0
16	Rudy Monk	Netherlands Antilles	400.0
17	Luis Fonseca	Costa Rica	355.0
AC	Gioacchino Caracausi	Italy	240.0
AC	Daniel Gevargiz	Iran	DNF
AC	Khristos Iakovou	Greece	DNF
