= Weightlifting at the 1972 Summer Olympics – Men's 52 kg =

Weightlifting at the Olympics

52 kg at the Games of the XX Olympiad
- Venue: Weightlifting Hall 7, Gewichtheberhalle
- Dates: 27 August
- Competitors: 17 from 13 nations

Medalists
1st place, gold medalist(s)		Zygmunt Smalcerz; Poland
2nd place, silver medalist(s)		Lajos Szűcs; Hungary
3rd place, bronze medalist(s)		Sándor Holczreiter; Hungary

The flyweight division has been added as the lightest weight category for the 1972 Summer Olympics. It had been contested international since 1969. Only men competed in all the weight classes.

== Results ==
Total of best lifts in military press, snatch and jerk. Ties are broken by the lightest bodyweight.

=== Final ===
Rank	Name	Nationality	Body weight	Military press (kg)				Snatch (kg)				Jerk (kg)				Total (kg)
Rank	Name	Nationality	Body weight	1	2	3	Result	1	2	3	Result	1	2	3	Result	Total (kg)
1st place, gold medalist(s)	Zygmunt Smalcerz	Poland	51.60	107.5	~~112.5~~	112.5	112.5 =OR	95.0	100.0	~~102.5~~	100.0	125.0	~~130.0~~	~~130.0~~	125.0	337.5 OR
2nd place, silver medalist(s)	Lajos Szűcs	Hungary	51.40	102.5	107.5	~~112.5~~	107.5	90.0	~~95.0~~	95.0	95.0	122.5	127.5	~~135.0~~	127.5	330.0
3rd place, bronze medalist(s)	Sándor Holczreiter	Hungary	51.75	~~112.5~~	112.5	~~120.0~~	112.5 OR	~~92.5~~	92.5	~~97.5~~	92.5	~~122.5~~	122.5	~~127.5~~	122.5	327.5
4	Tetsuhide Sasaki	Japan	51.80	97.5	102.5	105.0	105.0	90.0	95.0	97.5	97.5	120.0	~~125.0~~	~~125.0~~	120.0	322.5
5	Gyi Aung Maung	Burma	51.50	85.0	90.0	95.0	95.0	95.0	100.0	105.0	105.0 WR	115.0	120.0	~~125.0~~	120.0	320.0
6	Pak Dong-geun	North Korea	52.00	92.5	97.5	~~100.0~~	97.5	~~90.0~~	~~90.0~~	90.0	90.0	122.5	127.5	130.0	130.0 OR	317.5
7	Chaiya Sukchinda	Thailand	51.40	95.0	100.0	~~105.0~~	100.0	~~92.5~~	92.5	~~97.5~~	92.5	~~120.0~~	120.0	~~127.5~~	120.0	312.5
8	Ion Hortopan	Romania	51.70	90.0	95.0	97.5	97.5	90.0	95.0	~~97.5~~	95.0	110.0	15.0	117.5	117.5	310.0
9	Charles Depthios	Indonesia	51.95	95.0	~~100.0~~	~~100.0~~	95.0	~~90.0~~	90.0	~~95.0~~	90.0	~~125.0~~	~~125.0~~	125.0	125.0	310.0
10	Lester Francel	Colombia	52.00	95.0	100.0	~~105.0~~	100.0	~~80.0~~	80.0	85.0	85.0	~~112.5~~	117.5	~~120.0~~	117.5	302.5
11	Anil Mondal	India	51.65	85.0	90.0	95.0	95.0	80.0	85.0	~~90.0~~	85.0	107.5	112.5	117.5	117.5	297.5
12	Kyujiro Saito	Japan	51.80	~~95.0~~	95.0	~~100.0~~	95.0	90.0	~~95.0~~	97.5	90.0	110.0	~~122.5~~	~~122.5~~	110.0	295.0
13	Chun Hon Chan	Canada	52.00	87.5	~~92.5~~	92.5	92.5	~~87.5~~	87.5	~~92.5~~	87.5	107.5	112.5	~~115.0~~	112.5	292.5
14	Nigel Trance	Philippines	51.80	~~85.0~~	~~85.0~~	85.0	85.0	85.0	90.0	~~92.5~~	90.0	115.0	~~120.0~~	~~122.5~~	115.0	290.0
–	Mohammad Reza Nasehi	Iran	51.95	95.0	~~100.0~~	~~100.0~~	95.0	90.0	~~95.0~~	~~95.0~~	90.0	115.0	120.0	~~122.5~~	120.0	DQ [305.0]
–	Salvador del Rosario	Philippines	51.55	92.5	~~97.5~~	97.5	97.5	~~90.0~~	90.0	95.0	95.0	~~120.0~~	~~120.0~~	~~122.5~~	NVL	DNF
–	Waldemar Korcz	Poland	51.80	~~102.5~~	102.5	~~107.5~~	102.5	92.5	~~97.5~~	~~97.5~~	92.5	~~125.0~~	~~125.0~~	~~127.5~~	NVL	DNF

Key: WR = world record; OR = Olympic record; =OR = equaled Olympic record; DNF = did not finish; DQ = disqualified; NVL = no valid lift
