= Kamieńczyk =

Kamieńczyk may refer to the following places in Poland:

- Kamieńczyk, Lower Silesian Voivodeship (south-west Poland)
- Kamieńczyk, Kuyavian-Pomeranian Voivodeship (north-central Poland)
- Kamieńczyk, Sokołów County in Masovian Voivodeship (east-central Poland)
- Kamieńczyk, Wyszków County in Masovian Voivodeship (east-central Poland)
- Kamieńczyk, Warmian-Masurian Voivodeship (north Poland)
