= Luis Fonseca =

Luis Fonseca may refer to:

- Luis Fonseca (runner) (born 1977), Venezuelan marathon runner
- Luis Fonseca (United States Navy) (born 1980), hospital corpsman and Navy Cross recipient
- Luis Fonseca (weightlifter) (born 1949), Costa Rican Olympic weightlifter

== See also ==
- Fonseca (surname)
