= Kolotov =

Kolotov (feminine: Kolotova) is a Russian surname. Notable people with the surname include:

- Viktor Kolotov (1949–2000), Soviet and Ukrainian footballer
- Vasily Kolotov (1944–2001), Russian weightlifter
- Aleksandr Kolotov (born 1964), Russian water polo player
