= Świerczyn, Kuyavian-Pomeranian Voivodeship =

Świerczyn
- Village
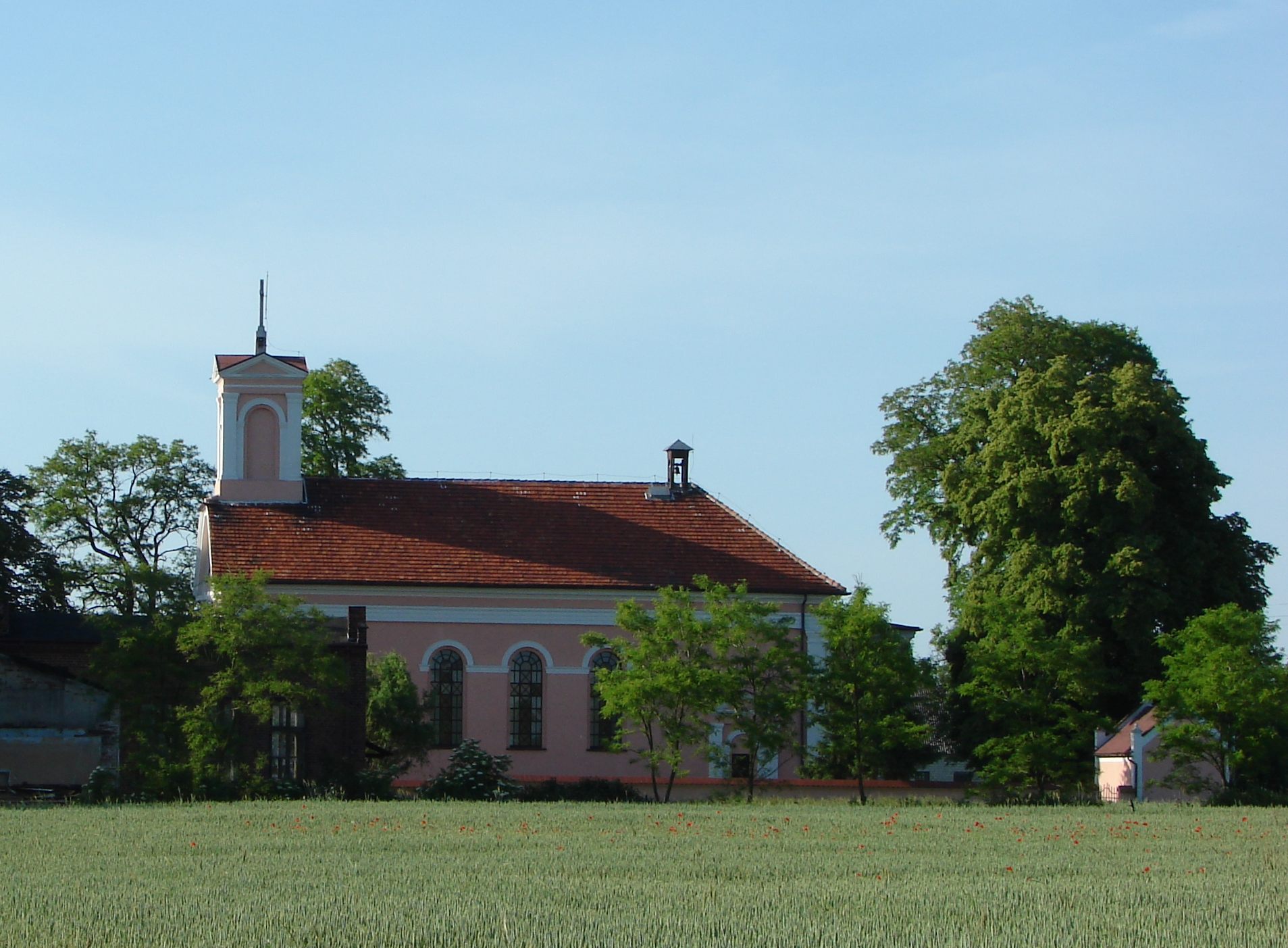
- St. Matthew church from 1862.

- Location within Poland
- Coordinates: 52°31′22″N 18°43′18″E
- Country: Poland
- Voivodeship: Kuyavian-Pomeranian
- County: Radziejów
- Gmina: Topólka

Świerczyn (Polish pronunciation: [ˈɕfjɛrt͡ʂɨn]) is a village in the administrative district of Gmina Topólka, within Radziejów County, Kuyavian-Pomeranian Voivodeship, in north-central Poland.
