= Gmina Topólka =

Gmina Topólka Topólka Commune
- Gmina
- Coat of arms
- Interactive map of Gmina Topólka
- Coordinates (Topólka): 52°31′N 18°43′E
- Country: Poland
- Voivodeship: Kuyavian-Pomeranian
- County: Radziejów
- Seat: Topólka

Area
  - Total: 102.92 km^{2} (39.74 sq mi)

Population (2006)
  - Total: 5,048
  - Density: 49.05/km^{2} (127.0/sq mi)
- Time zone: UTC+1 (CET)
  - Summer (DST): UTC+2 (CEST)
- Vehicle registration: CRA

Gmina Topólka is a rural gmina (administrative district) in Radziejów County, Kuyavian-Pomeranian Voivodeship, in central Poland. Its seat is the village of Topólka, which lies approximately 19 kilometres (12 mi) south-east of Radziejów and 58 km (36 mi) south of Toruń.

The gmina covers an area of 102.92 square kilometres (39.7 sq mi), and as of 2006 its total population is 5,048.

== Villages ==
Gmina Topólka contains the villages and settlements of Bielki, Borek, Chalno, Chalno-Parcele, Czamanin, Czamanin-Kolonia, Czamaninek, Dębianki, Galonki, Głuszynek, Iłowo, Jurkowo, Kamieńczyk, Kamieniec, Karczówek, Kozjaty, Miłachówek, Opielanka, Orle, Paniewek, Paniewo, Rogalki, Rybiny, Sadłóg, Sadłóżek, Sierakowy, Świerczyn, Świerczynek, Świnki, Topólka, Torzewo, Wola Jurkowa, Wyrobki, Żabiniec, Zgniły Głuszynek and Znaniewo.

== Neighbouring gminas ==
Gmina Topólka is bordered by the gminas of Babiak, Bytoń, Izbica Kujawska, Lubraniec, Osięciny, Piotrków Kujawski and Wierzbinek.
