= Kyujiro Saito =

Japanese weightlifter

Personal information
- Nationality: Japanese
- Born: 22 May 1947 (age 77)

Sport
- Sport: Weightlifting

Kyujiro Saito (斎藤 久治郎, Saitō Kyūjirō, born 22 May 1947) is a Japanese weightlifter. He competed in the men's flyweight event at the 1972 Summer Olympics.
