= Pablo Juan Campos =

Puerto Rican weightlifter

Personal information
- Nationality: Puerto Rican
- Born: 25 September 1950 (age 74); Copenhagen, Denmark

Sport
- Sport: Weightlifting

Pablo Juan Campos (born 25 September 1950) is a Puerto Rican weightlifter. He competed in the men's heavyweight event at the 1972 Summer Olympics.
