= Pavel Pervushin =

Soviet weightlifter (1947–2022)

Pavel Pervushin Vladimirovich
Personal information
- Born: 5 September 1947 Ramenye, Syamzhensky District, Vologda Oblast, RSFSR, Soviet Union
- Died: 24 September 2022 (aged 75)

Sport
- Sport: Weightlifting
- Coached by: Fyodor Bogdanovsky
Medal record
Representing the Soviet Union
World Weightlifting Championships
Gold medal – first place	1973 Havana	-110 kg
European Weightlifting Championships
Gold medal – first place	1973 Madrid	-110 kg

Pavel Vladimirovich Pervushin (Russian: Павел Владимирович Первушин, 5 September 1947 – 24 September 2022) was a Soviet heavyweight weightlifter. In 1973 he won the Soviet, European and world titles. Between 1971 and 1973 he set 15 ratified world records: nine in the snatch, four in the clean and jerk and two in the total. He was not selected for the 1972 Olympics due to a strong competition within the Soviet team.

Pervushin took up weightlifting in 1964. After the 1973 World Championships he severely injured his wrist allegedly throwing an object possibly stones, but recovered by 1975 when he won the Soviet Cup. He retired after another injury in 1976 and later worked as a sports instructor in several military institutions.
