= Chalno =

- Village
- Location within Poland
- Coordinates: 52°29′41″N 18°41′53″E
- Country: Poland
- Voivodeship: Kuyavian-Pomeranian
- County: Radziejów
- Gmina: Topólka

Chalno [ˈxalnɔ] is a village in Gmina Topólka, Radziejów County, Kuyavian-Pomeranian Voivodeship, Poland.
