= Galonki, Kuyavian-Pomeranian Voivodeship =

Galonki
- Village
- Location within Poland
- Coordinates: 52°30′46″N 18°42′36″E
- Country: Poland
- Voivodeship: Kuyavian-Pomeranian
- County: Radziejów
- Gmina: Topólka

Galonki [ɡaˈlɔnki] is a village in the administrative district of Gmina Topólka, within Radziejów County, Kuyavian-Pomeranian Voivodeship, in north-central Poland.
