= Świerczynek, Kuyavian-Pomeranian Voivodeship =

Świerczynek
- Village
- Location within Poland
- Coordinates: 52°32′1″N 18°43′17″E
- Country: Poland
- Voivodeship: Kuyavian-Pomeranian
- County: Radziejów
- Gmina: Topólka
- Time zone: UTC+1 (CET)
  - Summer (DST): UTC+2 (CEST)
- Vehicle registration: CRA

Świerczynek (Polish pronunciation: [ɕfjɛrˈt͡ʂɨnɛk]) is a village in the administrative district of Gmina Topólka, within Radziejów County, Kuyavian-Pomeranian Voivodeship, in central Poland. The family of John Krasinski, an actor and filmmaker of Polish origin, comes from Świerczynek.
