= Henry Phillips (weightlifter) =

Panamanian weightlifter

Personal information
- Nationality: Panamanian
- Born: 1947
- Died: 19 April 2025 (aged 77–78)

Sport
- Sport: Weightlifting

Henry Phillips (1947 – 19 April 2025) was a Panamanian weightlifter. He competed in the men's heavyweight event at the 1972 Summer Olympics. He died on 19 April 2025.
