= Czamanin-Kolonia =

- Village
- Location within Poland
- Coordinates: 52°28′52″N 18°42′41″E
- Country: Poland
- Voivodeship: Kuyavian-Pomeranian
- County: Radziejów
- Gmina: Topólka

Czamanin-Kolonia [t͡ʂaˈmanin kɔˈlɔɲa] is a village in the administrative district of Gmina Topólka, within Radziejów County, Kuyavian-Pomeranian Voivodeship, in north-central Poland.
