= Gioacchino Caracausi =

Italian weightlifter

Personal information
- Nationality: Italian
- Born: 8 June 1945; Palermo, Italy
- Died: 14 October 2011 (aged 66)

Sport
- Sport: Weightlifting

Gioacchino Caracausi (8 June 1945 – 14 October 2011) was an Italian weightlifter. He competed in the men's middleweight event at the 1968 Summer Olympics.
