= Czamaninek =

- Village
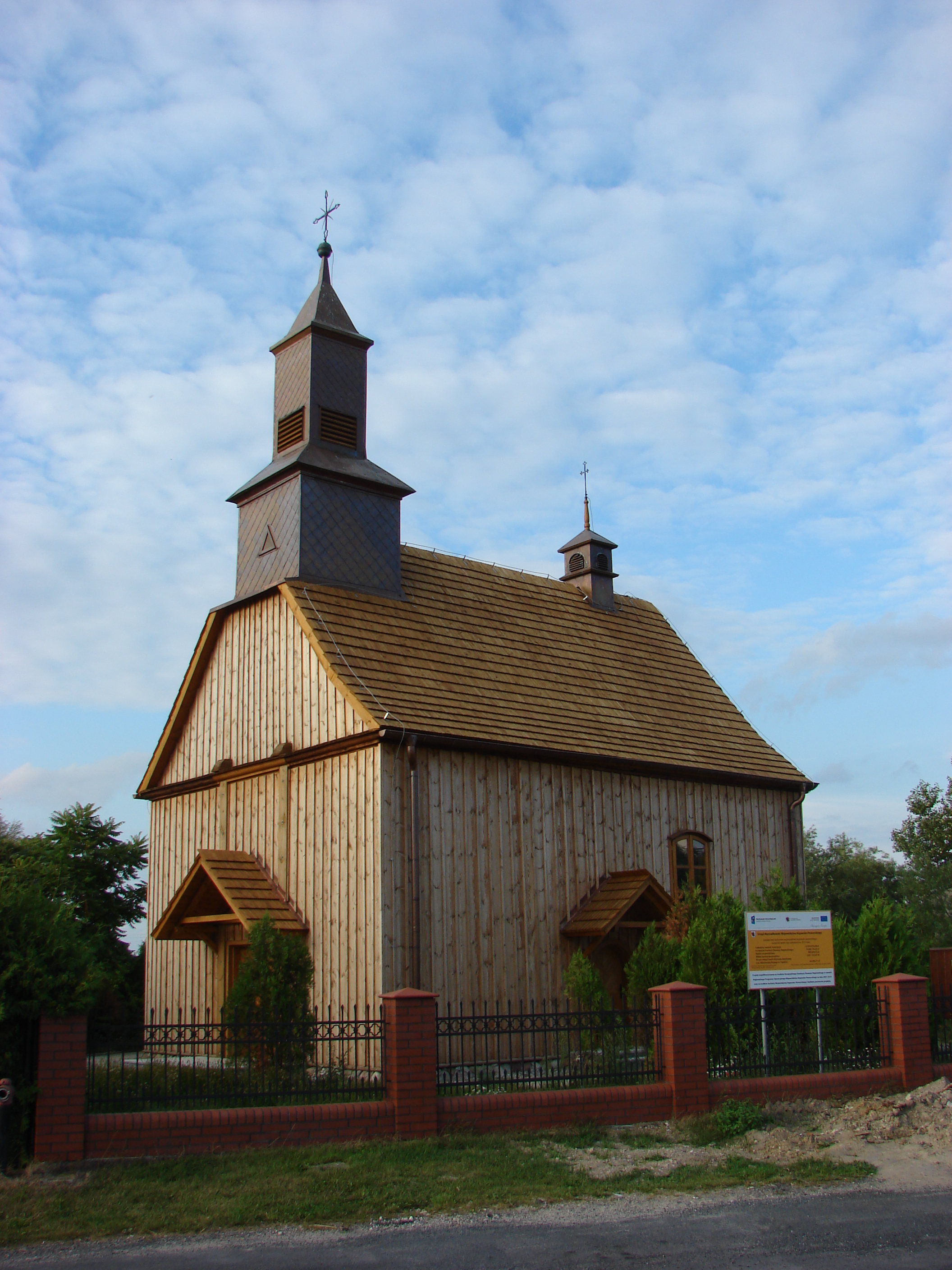
- St. Hieronymus church from 1773.

- Location within Poland
- Coordinates: 52°29′N 18°44′E
- Country: Poland
- Voivodeship: Kuyavian-Pomeranian
- County: Radziejów
- Gmina: Topólka

Czamaninek [t͡ʂamaˈninɛk] is a village in the administrative district of Gmina Topólka, within Radziejów County, Kuyavian-Pomeranian Voivodeship, in north-central Poland.
