= Roger Levecq =

French weightlifter

Personal information
- Nationality: French
- Born: 24 August 1935 (age 90) Loos, France

Sport
- Sport: Weightlifting

Roger Levecq (born 24 August 1935) is a French weightlifter. He competed in the men's heavyweight event at the 1968 Summer Olympics. His daughter Sylvie Levecq is also an athlete.
