= Nigel Trance =

Filipino weightlifter (born 1950)

Personal information
- Nationality: Filipino
- Born: 17 December 1950 (age 74)

Sport
- Sport: Weightlifting

Nigel Trance (born 17 December 1950) is a Filipino weightlifter. He competed in the men's flyweight event at the 1972 Summer Olympics.
