= Gennady Ivanchenko =

Soviet weightlifter (born 1947)

Personal information
- Born: 30 July 1947 (age 79) Gzhatsk, Smolensk Oblast, Russian SFSR, Soviet Union

Sport
- Sport: Weightlifting
- Club: Dynamo Riga
- Coached by: Michael Freifeld
Medal record
Representing the Soviet Union
World Championships
Gold medal – first place	1970 Columbus	-82.5 kg
European Championships
Gold medal – first place	1970 Szombathely	-82.5 kg
Gold medal – first place	1971 Sofia	-82.5 kg

Gennady Ivanovich Ivanchenko (Russian: Геннадий Иванович Иванченко, born 30 July 1947) is a retired Soviet light-heavyweight weightlifter. He won the Soviet and European titles in 1970–1971 and the world title in 1970. Between 1969 and 1972 he set eight ratified world records. His 1972 record of 178.5 kg (394 lb) in the press was never surpassed, as that event was discontinued the same year. Ivanchenko was left out of the 1972 Olympic team due to a fever. He retired in 1979 to become a weightlifting coach.
