= Rogalki =

- Village
- Location within Poland
- Coordinates: 52°31′42″N 18°40′25″E
- Country: Poland
- Voivodeship: Kuyavian-Pomeranian
- County: Radziejów
- Gmina: Topólka
- Population: 30

Rogalki [rɔˈɡalki] is a village in the administrative district of Gmina Topólka, within Radziejów County, Kuyavian-Pomeranian Voivodeship, in north-central Poland.
