= Bent Harsmann =

Danish weightlifter

Personal information
- Nationality: Danish
- Born: 21 January 1945 (age 80); Copenhagen, Denmark

Sport
- Sport: Weightlifting

Bent Harsmann (born 21 January 1945) is a Danish weightlifter. He competed in the men's heavyweight event at the 1972 Summer Olympics.
