= Chalno-Parcele =

- Village
- Location within Poland
- Coordinates: 52°29′0″N 18°39′44″E
- Country: Poland
- Voivodeship: Kuyavian-Pomeranian
- County: Radziejów
- Gmina: Topólka

Chalno-Parcele [ˈxalnɔ parˈt͡sɛlɛ] is a village in the administrative district of Gmina Topólka, within Radziejów County, Kuyavian-Pomeranian Voivodeship, in north-central Poland.
