= Vladimir Ryzhenkov =

Soviet weightlifter (1948–2011)

Personal information
- Born: 27 August 1948 Smolensk Oblast, Russian SFSR, Soviet Union
- Died: 14 August 2011 (aged 62) Moscow, Russia

Sport
- Sport: Weightlifting
- Club: Dynamo Moscow
- Coached by: Vladimir Pushkarev
Medal record
Representing the Soviet Union
World Weightlifting Championships
Gold medal – first place	1973 Havana	Light heavyweight
European Weightlifting Championships
Gold medal – first place	1973 Madrid	Light heavyweight
Gold medal – first place	1974 Verona	Light heavyweight

Vladimir Ilyich Ryzhenkov (Russian: Владимир Ильич Рыженков; 27 August 1948 – 14 August 2011) was a Soviet light heavyweight weightlifter. Between 1972 and 1974 he won one world and two European titles and set 12 official world records: six in the snatch, three in the clean and jerk and three in the total.

At the 1974 World Championships, while trying to set his 13th world record, Ryzhenkov badly injured his elbow and had to retire from active competitions. Between 1977 and 1991 he trained weightlifters at his club Dynamo Moscow, and after that remained active as a weightlifting functionary.
