= Wyrobki, Radziejów County =

Wyrobki
- Village
- Location within Poland
- Coordinates: 52°28′25″N 18°36′41″E
- Country: Poland
- Voivodeship: Kuyavian-Pomeranian
- County: Radziejów
- Gmina: Topólka

Wyrobki [vɨˈrɔpki] is a village in the administrative district of Gmina Topólka, within Radziejów County, Kuyavian-Pomeranian Voivodeship, in north-central Poland.
