= Sylvie Levecq =

French athlete

Personal information
- Nationality: France
- Born: 5 December 1962 (age 63) Lille

Sport
- Event: Combined Events

Sylvie Levecq is a former French athlete, born 5 December 1962 at Lille, who specialized in the pentathlon.

She was French Indoors Champion for the pentathlon in both 1984 and 1985.

She is the daughter of weightlifter Roger Levecq.
