= Czamanin =

- Village
- Location within Poland
- Coordinates: 52°29′N 18°43′E
- Country: Poland
- Voivodeship: Kuyavian-Pomeranian
- County: Radziejów
- Gmina: Topólka

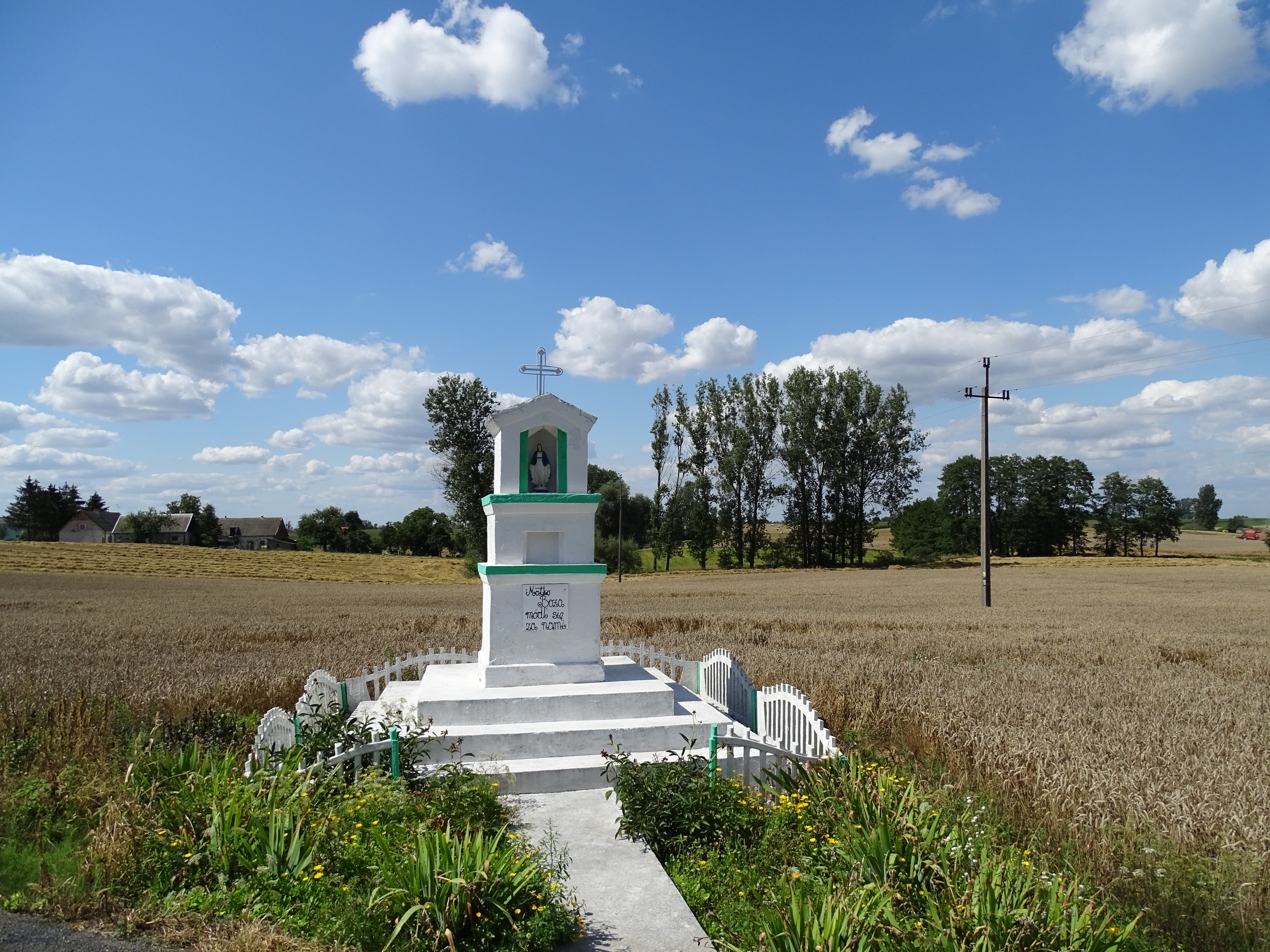
The roadside shrine.

Czamanin [t͡ʂaˈmanin] is a village in the administrative district of Gmina Topólka, within Radziejów County, Kuyavian-Pomeranian Voivodeship, in north-central Poland.
