= Żabiniec, Kuyavian-Pomeranian Voivodeship =

Żabiniec
- Village
- Location within Poland
- Coordinates: 52°28′40″N 18°38′4″E
- Country: Poland
- Voivodeship: Kuyavian-Pomeranian
- County: Radziejów
- Gmina: Topólka
- Population: 50

Żabiniec [ʐaˈbiɲɛt͡s] is a village in the administrative district of Gmina Topólka, within Radziejów County, Kuyavian-Pomeranian Voivodeship, in north-central Poland.
