= Orle, Radziejów County =

Orle
- Village
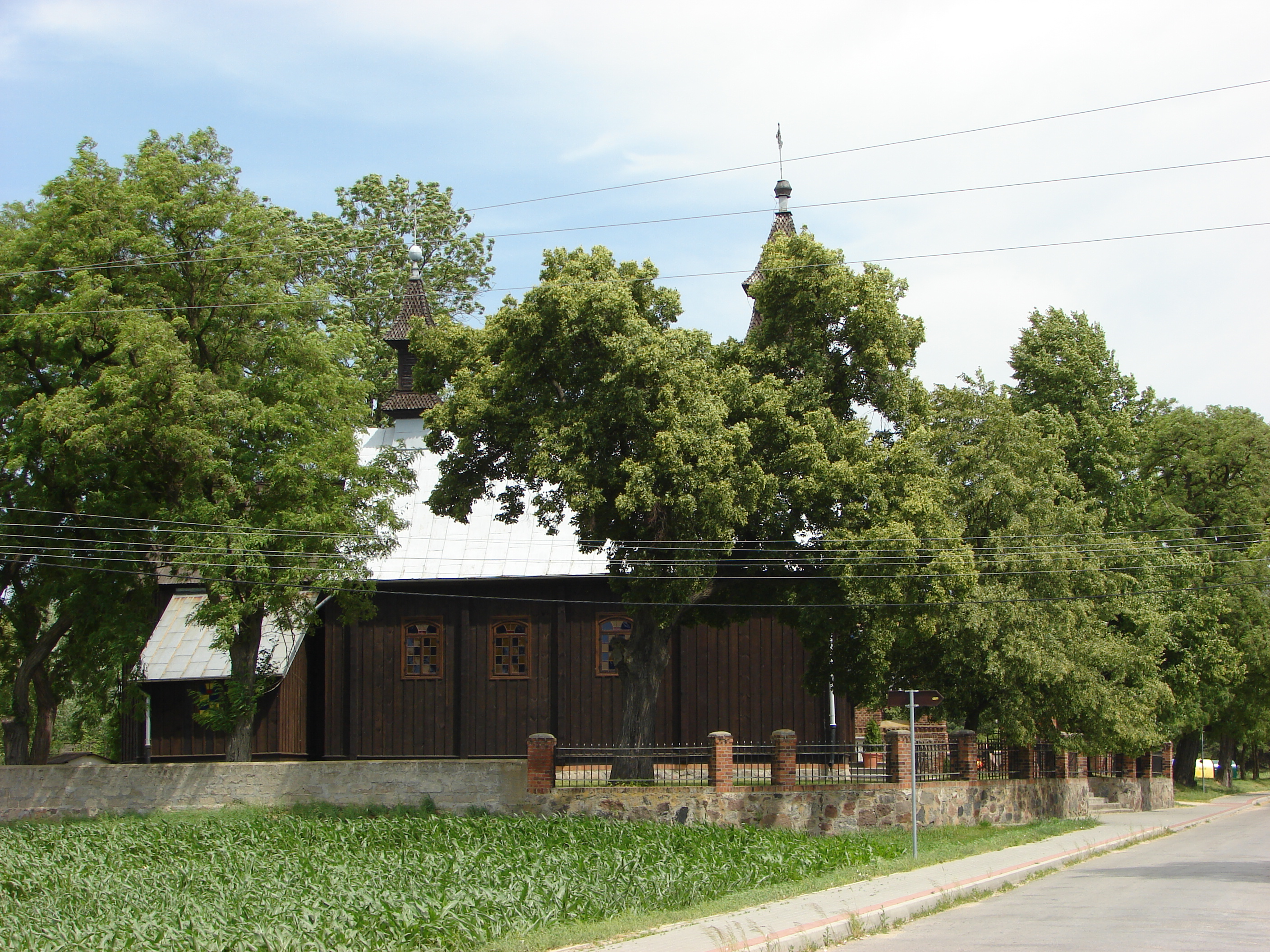
- Wooden church of St. Dorothy. 17th century.

- Location within Poland
- Coordinates: 52°28′58″N 18°38′38″E
- Country: Poland
- Voivodeship: Kuyavian-Pomeranian
- County: Radziejów
- Gmina: Topólka

Orle [ˈɔrlɛ] is a village in the administrative district of Gmina Topólka, within Radziejów County, Kuyavian-Pomeranian Voivodeship, in north-central Poland.
