= Kamieniec, Radziejów County =

Kamieniec
- Village
- Location within Poland
- Coordinates: 52°27′57″N 18°41′10″E
- Country: Poland
- Voivodeship: Kuyavian-Pomeranian
- County: Radziejów
- Gmina: Topólka
- Time zone: UTC+1 (CET)
  - Summer (DST): UTC+2 (CEST)

Kamieniec [kaˈmjɛɲɛt͡s] is a village in the administrative district of Gmina Topólka, within Radziejów County, Kuyavian-Pomeranian Voivodeship, in central Poland.

Two Polish citizens were murdered by Nazi Germany in the village during World War II.
