= Topólka, Kuyavian-Pomeranian Voivodeship =

Topólka
- Village
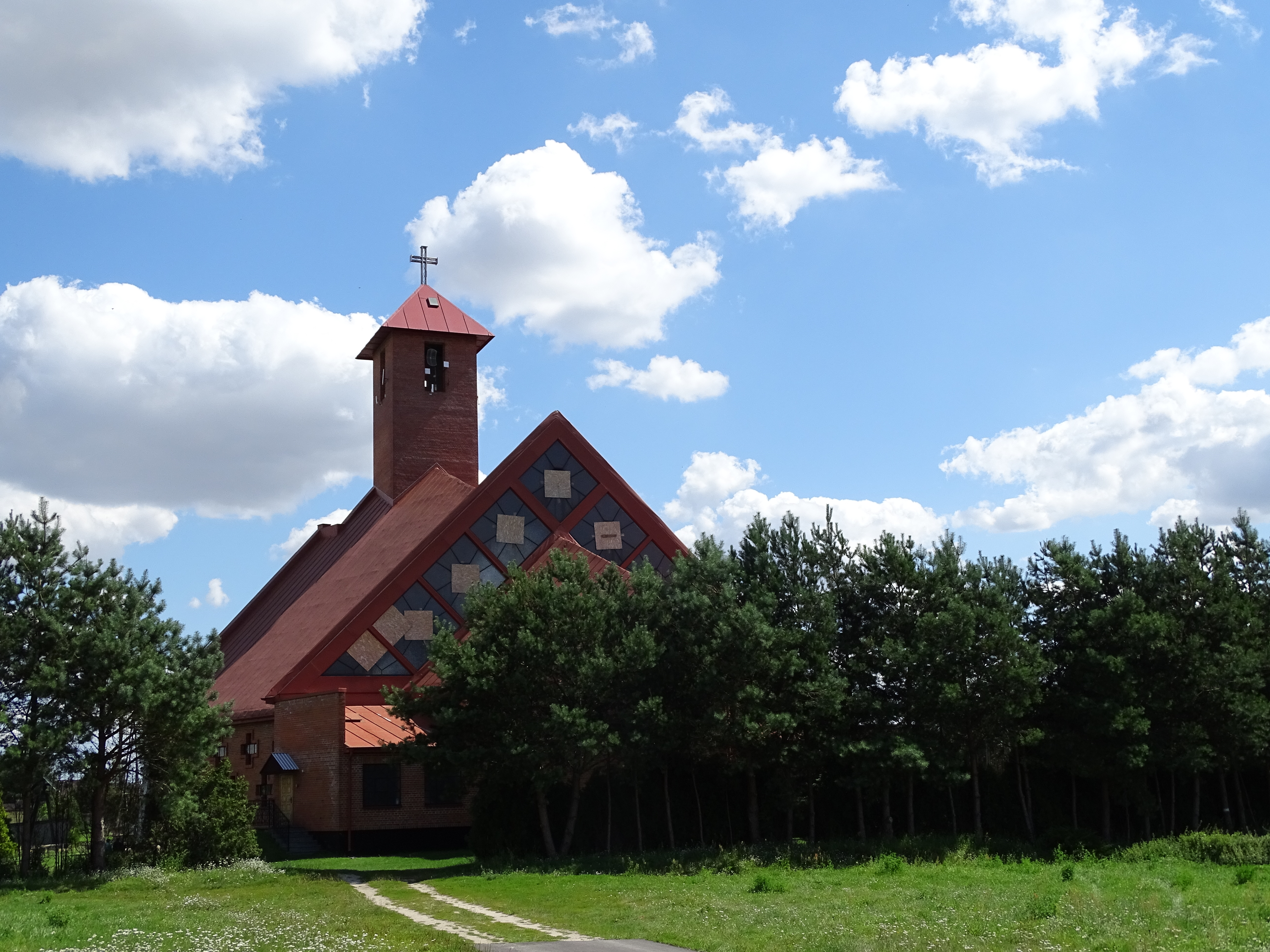
- Church of the Divine Mercy

- Location within Poland
- Coordinates: 52°31′N 18°43′E
- Country: Poland
- Voivodeship: Kuyavian-Pomeranian
- County: Radziejów
- Gmina: Topólka

Population
  - Total: 480

Topólka [tɔˈpulka] is a village in Radziejów County, Kuyavian-Pomeranian Voivodeship, in north-central Poland. It is the seat of the gmina (administrative district) called Gmina Topólka.
