= Edgar Kjerran =

Norwegian weightlifter

Personal information
- Nationality: Norwegian
- Born: 9 October 1946 (age 78); Bergen, Norway

Sport
- Sport: Weightlifting

Edgar Kjerran (born 9 October 1946) is a Norwegian weightlifter. He competed in the men's heavyweight event at the 1972 Summer Olympics.
