= Vladislav Krishchishin =

Ukrainian weightlifter (1946–2001)

Personal information
- Born: 19 November 1946 Lviv, Ukraine
- Died: 8 April 2001 (aged 54) Lviv, Ukraine

Sport
- Sport: Weightlifting
- Club: Soviet Army
Medal record
Representing the Soviet Union
World Weightlifting Championships
Gold medal – first place	1969 Warsaw	Flyweight
European Weightlifting Championships
Gold medal – first place	1969 Warsaw	Flyweight
Gold medal – first place	1970 Szombathely	Flyweight

Vladislav Vasilyovich Krishchishin (Ukrainian: Владислав Васильович Крищишин, 19 November 1946 – 8 April 2001) was a Ukrainian flyweight weightlifter. In 1969–1970 he won one world and two European titles, and set 11 official world records: seven in the press and four in the clean and jerk. In retirement he worked as a dentist.
