= Norair Nurikyan =

Bulgarian weightlifter (1948–2025)

Medal record

Men's weightlifting

Representing Bulgaria

Olympic Games
Gold medal – first place	1972 Munich	-60 kg
Gold medal – first place	1976 Montreal	-56 kg

World Championships
Bronze medal – third place	1971 Lima	-60 kg
Gold medal – first place	1972 Munich	-60 kg
Silver medal – second place	1973 Havana	-60 kg
Bronze medal – third place	1974 Manila	-60 kg
Gold medal – first place	1976 Montreal	-56 kg

European Championships
Bronze medal – third place	1969 Warsaw	-56 kg
Silver medal – second place	1972 Constanţa	-60 kg
Silver medal – second place	1973 Madrid	-60 kg
Bronze medal – third place	1974 Verona	-60 kg
Gold medal – first place	1976 Berlin	-56 kg

Balkan Championships
Gold medal – first place	1973 Athens	-60 kg
Gold medal – first place	1974 Burgas	-60 kg
Gold medal – first place	1975 Sombor	-60 kg

Bulgarian Championships
Gold medal – first place	1971 Sofia	-60 kg
Gold medal – first place	1972 Sofia	-60 kg
Gold medal – first place	1975 Yambol	-60 kg
Silver medal – second place	1967 Sofia	-56 kg
Silver medal – second place	1968 Sofia	-56 kg
Silver medal – second place	1970 Sofia	-56 kg
Silver medal – second place	1974 Vidin	-60 kg
Bronze medal – third place	1969 Sofia	-56 kg

Norair Nurikyan (Bulgarian: Норайр Нурикян, Armenian: Նորայր Նուրիկյան; 26 July 1948 – 11 March 2025) was a Bulgarian weightlifter of Armenian descent, who was a two-time Olympic Champion and was awarded the Hero of Socialist Labor of Bulgaria and Order of the Bulgaria, First Degree titles. In 1994, Nurikyan was inducted into the International Weightlifting Federation Hall of Fame.

== Early life ==
Norair was born in Sliven, Bulgaria to Armenian parents. His father was a baker and was very strong physically. Norair believed he inherited his father's strength. Like most Armenians in Sliven, Nurikyan took violin lessons. In 1958–1959, one of his teachers, who noticed his strong looks, told him "You won't make a violinist. You'd make a boxer."

The first sport Nurikyan took part in was basketball. He used to play with Boycho Branzov, a Bulgarian basketball player who became a key member of the national team. Nurikyan was too short to succeed in basketball. In their spare time, Norair and two of his friends decided to go into the weightlifting hall, where he was spotted by weightlifting coach Ivan Abadjiev. Abadjiev offered Nurikyan to start training with him, feeling his talents were better spent in weightlifting. Nurikyan decided to accept his offer. Abadjiev then promised him he'd make great progress in a year. Exactly one year later, Nurikyan became a Master of Sports.

== Career ==
Nurikyan first had to go to the army and was later discharged. He then went to the Higher School of Sports, where Abadjiev was now the federative coach of Sofia. Nurikyan was not the best at first, but with hard work soon became second in his category on the Bulgarian national weightlifting team, behind Atanas Kirov, the first Bulgarian to become a European Champion. He credited Abadjiev with always believing in him as the reason why he improved.

In 1969, Nurikyan achieved his first international success outside Bulgaria, becoming third in European and fifth in the world that year. He soon became second in European and third in the world in 1971. During preparations in Bulgaria for the 1972 Summer Olympics, Nurikyan broke a bone in his right wrist in January 1972 and couldn't train. Abadjiev then had the idea for him to just squat with the barbell. So, while others would snatch, Nurikyan would squat, and while other clean and jerked, he squatted. He did this for three months until his bone healed. Nurikyan's squats improved from 200 kg to 230 kg during this time.

On the first day of the 1972 Olympic Games, the bus that was taking them to the hall burst into flames. By fate, another bus was going that way and took the team in time for weighing. If they had not made it, they would have been disqualified.

The next day, competition in Nurikyan's category started. The favorite was Soviet Georgian Dito Shanidze, who was considered a sure winner by everyone. Nurikyan and Shanidze both set the military press Olympic record. Shanidze narrowly beat Nurikyan in the snatch. Abadjiev told Norair the one with the stronger mind and character will become Olympic Champion. In order to win the Olympic gold medal, Nurikyan needed to lift 157.5 kg in the clean and jerk, which would be a new world record. Nurikyan pulled the barbell to his chest and then lifted it above his head. It took him three to steps to maintain his balance. The three white lamps lit up and Nurikyan became the Olympic gold medalist and set the division total record at 402.5 kg. Nurikyan became the first weightlifter from Bulgaria to become an Olympic medalist in weightlifting, an Olympic Champion in weightlifting and an Olympic Champion in heavy athletics.

After the 1972 Olympics, Nurikyan had met his wife and for a while training "went to the background." He began to get his "normal" second and third place in European and World Championships. In 1975, Nurikyan returned to top shape and was ready to win. It was at this time that Nurikyan and Abadjiev tried an experiment. They tried to compete at a lower category. Nurikyan was unable to set a total at the World Championships that year and Abadjiev was greatly criticized.

By 1976, Nurikyan had finally adjusted to his new category and won the European Championships in that weight category. At the 1976 Summer Olympics, Nurikyan had no problem winning his second Olympic gold medal. Nurikyan was later told by his wife that Abadjiev had cried. Nurikyan became the first weightlifter from Bulgaria to become an Olympic medalist and Olympic Champion twice.

Nurikyan retired afterward in order to be with his family more. He soon became a coach, assistant to Abadjiev on the national team. He later became head coach himself.

== Personal life and death ==
Nurikyan met his wife, Merry, sometime after the 1972 Olympics. They got married sometime later, and had a son in 1974. Nurikyan died from cancer on 11 March 2025, at the age of 76.

== Weightlifting achievements ==
- Olympic champion – 1972, 1976.
- World champion – 1972, 1976.
- Silver medalist in World Championships – 1973.
- Bronze medalist in World Championships – 1971, 1974.
- European champion – 1976.
- Silver medalist in European Championships – 1972, 1973.
- Bronze medalist in European Championships – 1969, 1974.
- Set four world records during his career.
