= Iłowo, Radziejów County =

Iłowo
- Village
- Location within Poland
- Coordinates: 52°31′6″N 18°41′39″E
- Country: Poland
- Voivodeship: Kuyavian-Pomeranian
- County: Radziejów
- Gmina: Topólka
- Population: 120

Iłowo [iˈwɔvɔ] is a village in the administrative district of Gmina Topólka, within Radziejów County, Kuyavian-Pomeranian Voivodeship, in north-central Poland.
