= Albert Huser =

German weightlifter

Personal information
- Nationality: German
- Born: 26 May 1936 (age 88); Mannheim, Germany

Sport
- Sport: Weightlifting

Albert Huser (born 26 May 1936) is a German weightlifter. He competed in the men's middleweight event at the 1968 Summer Olympics.
