= Karl Arnold (weightlifter) =

German weightlifter

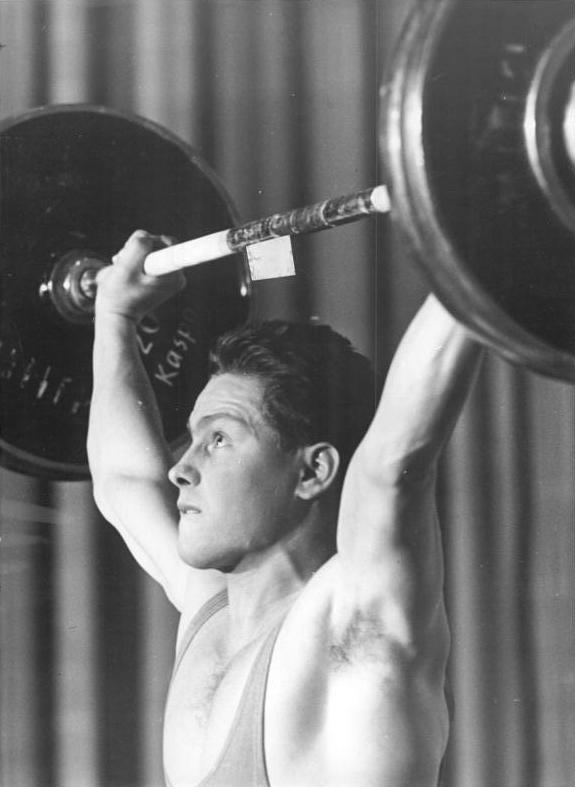
- Karl Arnold in 1963

Personal information
- Born: 28 October 1940 Dittelsdorf, Germany
- Died: 28 February 2012 (aged 71)
- Height: 1.72 m (5 ft 8 in)
- Weight: 82 kg (181 lb)

Sport
- Sport: Weightlifting
- Club: SG Robur Zittau
Medal record
Representing East Germany
European Championships
| Bronze medal – third place | 1968 Leningrad | Light-heavyweight; 155+135+175 kg |

Karl Arnold (28 October 1940 – 28 February 2012) was a German light-heavyweight weightlifter. He finished in eighth and fifth place at the 1964 and 1968 Summer Olympics, respectively, and won a bronze medal at the 1968 European Championships.
