= Luis Fonseca (weightlifter) =

Costa Rican weightlifter

Personal information
- Born: 25 December 1949 (age 75); San José, Costa Rica

Sport
- Sport: Weightlifting

Luis Fonseca (born 25 December 1949) is a Costa Rican weightlifter. He competed in the men's middleweight event at the 1968 Summer Olympics, where he was placed 17th.
