= Vladimir Smetanin =

Russian weightlifter (born 1937)

Personal information
- Born: 13 February 1937 (age 89) Podlipki, Moscow Oblast, Russia

Sport
- Sport: Weightlifting
Medal record
Representing the Soviet Union
World championships
Silver medal – second place	1969 Warsaw	-52 kg
European championships
Silver medal – second place	1969 Warsaw	-52 kg
Bronze medal – third place	1970 Szombathely	-52 kg

Vladimir Semyonovich Smetanin (Russian: Владимир Семенович Сметанин, born 13 February 1937) is a retired Russian flyweight weightlifter who was active between 1961 and 1973. During this period he won five Soviet titles and three medals at world and European championships and set two ratified world records, both in the total (1970 and 1973).

Smetanin's father was executed during the Stalin's purges of 1937, and his family was moved from Moscow to the Urals, where he was raised by his mother.
