= Ion Hortopan =

Romanian weightlifter (1941–1980)

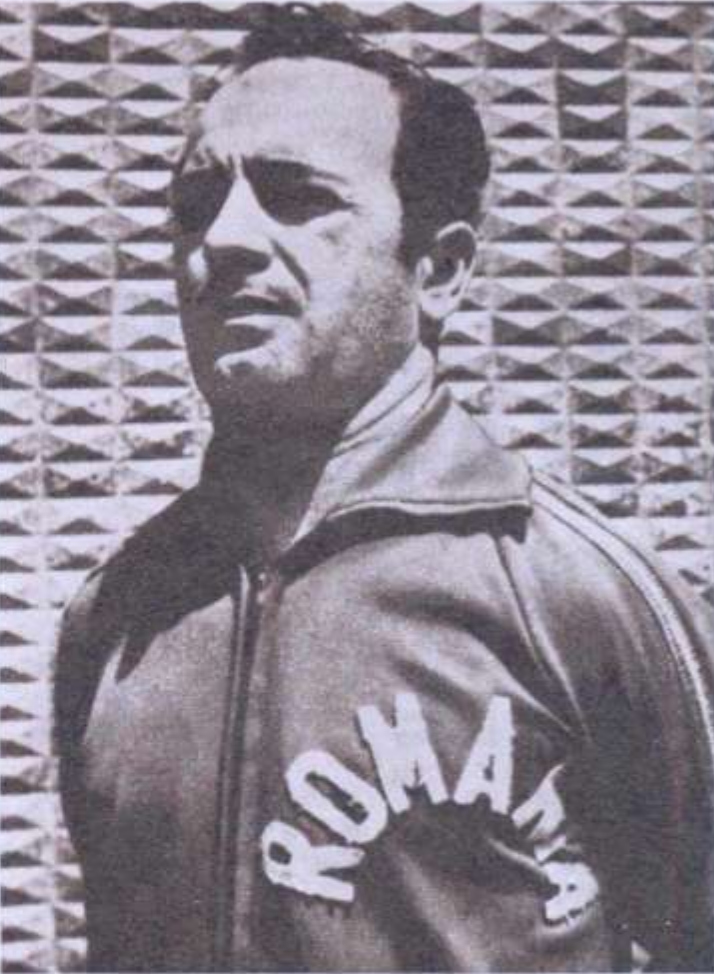

Personal information
- Born: 16 June 1941 Câmpina
- Died: 1980
- Height: 152 cm (5 ft 0 in)
- Weight: 52 kg (115 lb)

Sport
- Country: Romania
- Sport: Weightlifting
- Weight class: 52 kg
- Club: Olimpia, București (ROU)
- Team: National team
Medal record
Men's Weightlifting
Representing Romania
World Championships
Bronze medal – third place	1973	52 kg (snatch)

Ion Hortopan (16 June 1941 in Câmpina – 1980) was a Romanian male former weightlifter, who competed in the 52 kg category and represented Romania at international competitions. He won the bronze medal in the snatch at the 1973 World Weightlifting Championships lifting 100.0 kg. He participated at the 1972 Summer Olympics in the 52 kg event.
