= Salvador del Rosario =

Filipino weightlifter

Personal information
- Born: Salvador Romualdo del Rosario; October 24, 1944 (age 81)
- Home town: Cabangan, Zambales, Philippine Commonwealth
Medal record
Representing the Philippines
World Championships
Gold medal – first place	1970 Columbus	60 kg (clean & jerk)
Bronze medal – third place	1970 Columbus	60 kg (snatch)
Asian Championships
Gold medal – first place	1971 Manila	52 kg
Asian Games
Silver medal – second place	1970 Bangkok	52 kg

Salvador Romualdo del Rosario (born October 24, 1944), nicknamed, The Mighty Mite, is a Filipino weightlifter who competed at the 1968, 1972 and 1976 Summer Olympics with a best finish of ninth in 1972 and 1976.

Del Rosario represented the Philippines at the 1970 World Weightlifting Championships in Ohio. He was awarded a gold medal after athletes who made heavier lifts were disqualified for doping.
