= Jean-Pierre Van Lerberghe =

Belgian weightlifter

Personal information
- Nationality: Belgian
- Born: 24 April 1947 (age 77); Ixelles, Belgium

Sport
- Sport: Weightlifting

Jean-Pierre Van Lerberghe (born 24 April 1947) is a Belgian weightlifter. He competed at the 1968 Summer Olympics and the 1976 Summer Olympics.
