= Petar Yanev =

Bulgarian weightlifter

Personal information
- Nationality: Bulgarian
- Born: 3 September 1945 (age 79); Novi Pazar, Bulgaria

Sport
- Sport: Weightlifting

Petar Yanev (Bulgarian: Петър Янев, born 3 September 1945) is a Bulgarian weightlifter. He competed in the men's featherweight event at the 1968 Summer Olympics.
