= Yusaku Ono =

Japanese weightlifter (born 1947)

Personal information
- Born: 3 February 1947 (age 79)
- Height: 160 cm (5 ft 3 in)
- Weight: 68 kg (150 lb)

Sport
- Country: Japan
- Sport: Weightlifting
- Weight class: 67.5
- Team: National team
Medal record
Men's Weightlifting
Representing Japan
World Championships
| Bronze medal – third place | 1970 | 67.5 (snatch) |
- Updated on 12 November 2016

Yusaku Ono (小野 祐策, Ono Yūsaku; born 3 February 1947) is a Japanese male former weightlifter, who competed in the 67.5 category and represented Japan at international competitions. He won the bronze medal in the snatch at the 1970 World Weightlifting Championships lifting 125.0 kg. He participated at the 1972 Summer Olympics and at the 1976 Summer Olympics.
