= Ludkovice =

Municipality in the Czech Republic

- Municipality
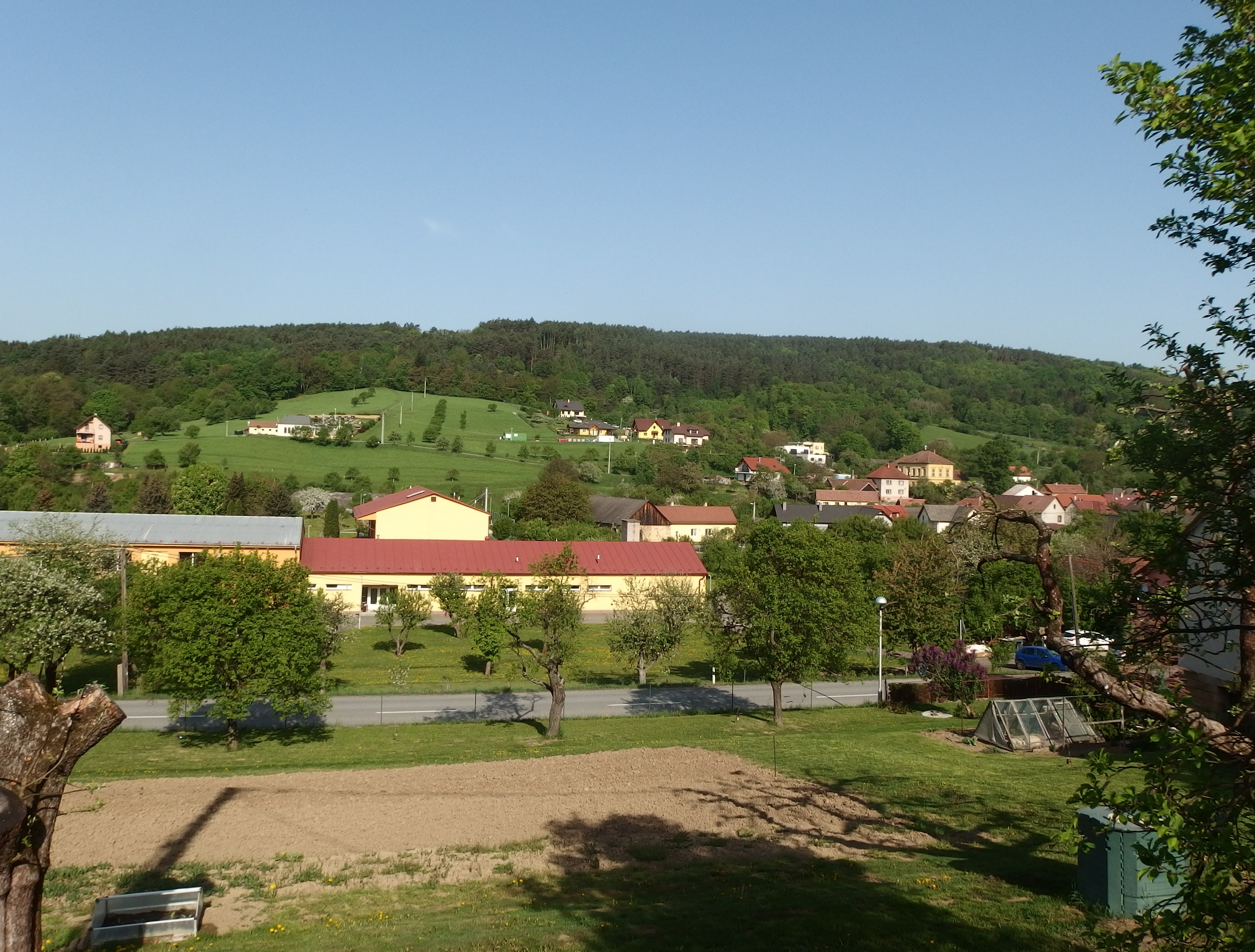
- General view

- Flag Coat of arms

- Location in the Czech Republic
- Coordinates: 49°6′53″N 17°43′36″E
- Country: Czech Republic
- Region: Zlín
- District: Zlín
- First mentioned: 1412

Area
  - Total: 11.87 km^{2} (4.58 sq mi)
- Elevation: 267 m (876 ft)

Population (2026-01-01)
  - Total: 712
  - Density: 60.0/km^{2} (155/sq mi)
- Time zone: UTC+1 (CET)
  - Summer (DST): UTC+2 (CEST)
- Postal code: 763 41
- Website: www.ludkovice.cz

Ludkovice is a municipality and village in Zlín District in the Zlín Region of the Czech Republic. It has about 700 inhabitants.

== Administrative division ==
Ludkovice consists of two municipal parts (in brackets population according to the 2021 census):

- Ludkovice (628)
- Pradlisko (59)

== Etymology ==
The name of Ludkovice is derived from the personal name Luděk. The name of Pradlisko is derived from prát (i.e. 'to wash') and referred to the place on the stream used to wash clothes.

== Geography ==
Ludkovice is located about 13 kilometres (8 mi) south of Zlín. It lies in the Vizovice Highlands. The highest point is the hill Rysov at 542 m (1,778 ft) above sea level. The stream Ludkovický potok flows through the municipality. Ludkovice Reservoir is located on the stream.

== History ==
The first written mention of Ludkovice is from 1412, when it belonged to the Světlov estate. Pradlovice was first mentioned in 1594.

Pradlisko was originally a part of Řetechov municipality and from 1976 a part of Luhačovice, after Řetechov merged with Luhačovice. Since 1980, it has been a part of Ludkovice.

== Demographics ==
Historical population

Year	Pop.	±%
1869	601	—
1880	715	+19.0%
1890	673	−5.9%
1900	716	+6.4%
1910	730	+2.0%

Year	Pop.	±%
1921	757	+3.7%
1930	785	+3.7%
1950	764	−2.7%
1961	853	+11.6%
1970	777	−8.9%

Year	Pop.	±%
1980	772	−0.6%
1991	674	−12.7%
2001	681	+1.0%
2011	687	+0.9%
2021	687	+0.0%

Source: Censuses

== Transport ==
There are no railways or major roads passing through the municipality.

== Sights ==
The oldest monument is a column shrine from 1692.
