= Jean-Paul Fouletier =

French weightlifter (1939–2016)

Personal information
- Born: 1 July 1939 Douala
- Died: 27 August 2016 (aged 77)
- Height: 175 cm (5 ft 9 in)
- Weight: 108 kg (238 lb)

Sport
- Country: France
- Sport: Weightlifting
- Weight class: 110 kg
- Team: National team
Medal record
Men's Weightlifting
Representing France
World Championships
Bronze medal – third place	1970	110 kg (snatch)
- Updated on 12 November 2016

Jean-Paul Fouletier (1 July 1939 – 27 August 2016) was a French male weightlifter, who competed in the 110 kg category and represented France at international competitions. He won the bronze medal in the snatch at the 1970 World Weightlifting Championships lifting 152.5 kg. He participated at the 1968 Summer Olympics and at the 1972 Summer Olympics in the 110 kg event.
