= René Gómez =

Cuban weightlifter

Personal information
- Born: 9 February 1944 (age 81); Matanzas, Cuba

Sport
- Sport: Weightlifting

René Gómez (born 9 February 1944) is a Cuban weightlifter. He competed in the men's middleweight event at the 1968 Summer Olympics.
