= Lajos Szűcs (weightlifter) =

Hungarian weightlifter (1946–1999)

Olympic medal record

Men's weightlifting

Representing Hungary
Silver medal – second place	1972 Munich	flyweight

World Championships
Silver medal – second place	1972 Munich	52 kg
Silver medal – second place	1973 Havana	52 kg
Bronze medal – third place	1975 Moscow	52 kg

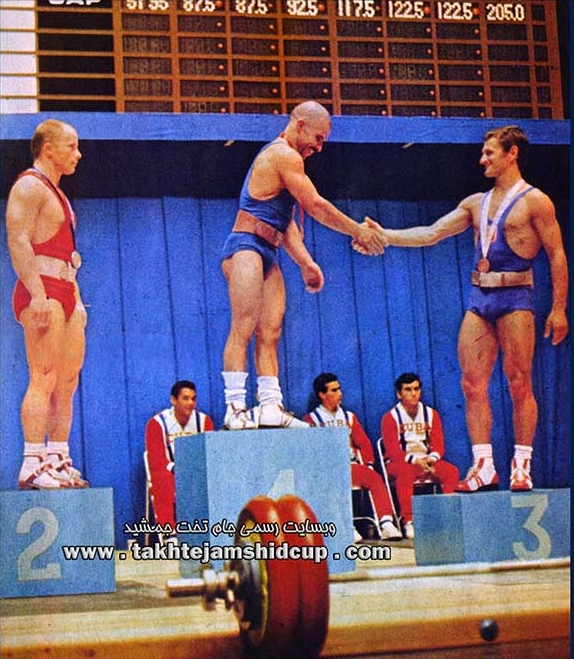
Lajos Szűcs (left) winning silver medal of 52 kg at 1973 World Weightlifting Championships

Lajos Szűcs (13 February 1946 in Cinkota – 2 September 1999 in Miskolc) was a Hungarian weightlifter who competed in the 1972 Summer Olympics and in the 1976 Summer Olympics.
