= Mauno Lindroos =

Finnish weightlifter (born 1941)

Personal information
- Nationality: Finnish
- Born: 10 March 1941 (age 85) Ulvila, Finland

Sport
- Sport: Weightlifting

Mauno Lindroos (born 10 March 1941) is a Finnish weightlifter and powerlifter. He competed in the men's heavyweight event at the 1968 Summer Olympics.
