= Peppino Tanti =

Italian weightlifter

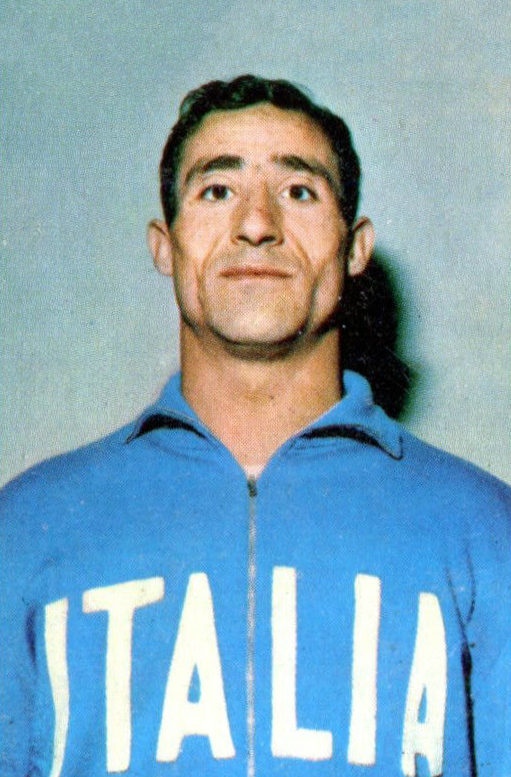

Personal information
- Born: 24 August 1941 (age 84) Sennori, Italy
- Height: 1.61 m (5 ft 3 in)
- Weight: 60 kg (130 lb)

Sport
- Sport: Weightlifting
- Club: Polisportiva Sassarese, Sassari

Giuseppe "Peppino" Tanti (born 24 August 1941) is a retired Italian featherweight weightlifter who won a bronze medal at the 1970 World Championships. He competed at the 1972 and 1976 Summer Olympics and finished in 8th and 10th place, respectively.
