= Koji Miki =

Japanese weightlifter

Personal information
- Nationality: Japanese
- Born: 8 September 1946 (age 78)

Sport
- Sport: Weightlifting

Koji Miki (in Japanese: 三木功司, born 8 September 1946) is a Japanese weightlifter. He competed in the men's bantamweight event at the 1972 Summer Olympics.
