= Kamieńczyk, Kuyavian-Pomeranian Voivodeship =

Kamieńczyk
- Village
- Location within Poland
- Coordinates: 52°27′24″N 18°40′3″E
- Country: Poland
- Voivodeship: Kuyavian-Pomeranian
- County: Radziejów
- Gmina: Topólka

Kamieńczyk (Polish pronunciation: [kaˈmjɛj̃tʂɨk]) is a village in the administrative district of Gmina Topólka, within Radziejów County, Kuyavian-Pomeranian Voivodeship, in north-central Poland.
