= János Bagócs =

Hungarian weightlifter

Personal information
- Nationality: Hungarian
- Born: 2 February 1945 (age 80); Szigetszentmiklós, Hungary

Sport
- Sport: Weightlifting

János Bagócs (born 2 February 1945) is a Hungarian weightlifter. He competed in the men's lightweight event at the 1968 Summer Olympics.
