= Javier González (weightlifter) =

Cuban weightlifter (born 1949)

Personal information
- Nationality: Cuban
- Born: 3 December 1949 (age 75)

Sport
- Sport: Weightlifting

Javier González (born 3 December 1949) is a Cuban weightlifter. He competed at the 1972 Summer Olympics and the 1976 Summer Olympics.
