= Atanas Kirov =

Bulgarian weightlifter (1946–2017)

- At the 1969 World Weightlifting Championships

Personal information
- Born: 24 September 1946 Burgas, Bulgaria
- Died: 27 January 2017 (aged 70) Sofia, Bulgaria
- Height: 156 cm (5 ft 1 in)
- Weight: 56 kg (123 lb)

Sport
- Sport: Weightlifting
- Club: Neftochimic Burgas
Medal record
Representing Bulgaria
World Weightlifting Championships
Silver medal – second place	1969 Warsaw	-56 kg
Gold medal – first place	1973 Havana	-56 kg
Gold medal – first place	1974 Manila	-56 kg
Gold medal – first place	1975 Moscow	-56 kg
European Weightlifting Championships
Gold medal – first place	1969 Warsaw	-56 kg
Gold medal – first place	1973 Madrid	-56 kg
Gold medal – first place	1974 Verona	-56 kg
Gold medal – first place	1975 Moscow	-56 kg
Balkan Weightlifting Championships
Gold medal – first place	1968 Yambol	-56 kg
Gold medal – first place	1969 Bucharest	-56 kg
Gold medal – first place	1973 Athens	-56 kg
Gold medal – first place	1974 Burgas	-56 kg
Danube Cup
Gold medal – first place	1967 Bratislava	-56 kg
Gold medal – first place	1970 Sofia	-56 kg
Gold medal – first place	1973 Havirov	-56 kg
Gold medal – first place	1975 Donaueschingen	-56 kg
Silver medal – second place	1972 Budapest	-60 kg
Bronze medal – third place	1969 Bucharest	-56 kg
Bulgarian Weightlifting Championships
Gold medal – first place	1967 Sofia	-56 kg
Gold medal – first place	1968 Sofia	-56 kg
Gold medal – first place	1969 Sofia	-56 kg
Gold medal – first place	1970 Sofia	-56 kg
Gold medal – first place	1972 Sofia	-56 kg
Gold medal – first place	1975 Yambol	-56 kg
Gold medal – first place	1976 Dimitrovgrad	-60 kg
Gold medal – first place	1977 Yambol	-56 kg
Gold medal – first place	1979 Sofia	-56 kg
Silver medal – second place	1966 Veliko Tarnovo	-60 kg
Silver medal – second place	1971 Sofia	-60 kg
Silver medal – second place	1973 Vidin	-60 kg
Bronze medal – third place	1965 Asenovgrad	-56 kg

Atanas Kirov (Bulgarian: Атанас Киров, 24 September 1946 – 27 January 2017) was a Bulgarian bantamweight weightlifter. He was a three-time World Champion, winning the bantamweight title consecutively from 1973 to 1975. Kirov won four European titles, winning the bantamweight class in 1969 and 1973–75. He also earned a World silver medal in 1969. Kirov set two official world records in the total, with 257.5 kg in September 1973 in Havana, Cuba; and 260.0 kg in February 1974 in his hometown of Burgas. For his achievements he was made an honorary citizen of Burgas. Kirov was responsible for starting the long-line of great Bulgarian lifters, especially in the lighter classes. He was born on 24 September 1946, in Burgas. He began competing in 1962 at the Chernomorets Club with coach Ilya Babachev, later transferred to Neftochimic Burgas. Only a 156 cm tall competitor, fitting perfectly into the bantam scales, he dominated the home scene for a decade. At the 1968 Olympics he took 7th place (335 kg). Then came September 1969 and the World and European Championships in Warsaw. 14 competitors took part in the bantam. The press was won by Földi with 125 kg, Kirov was third with 107.5 kg. The snatch was dominated by Trebicki (107.5 kg), second was Földi with 105 kg and Kirov registered 102.5 kg. In the clean and jerk Földi and Trebicki got zero and dropped, Kirov lifted 137.5 kg and that was enough for the European title (347.5 kg). He was second in the world behind Mohamed Nassiri (360 kg). In the World Championships in 1971 Kirov finished 5th (352.5 kg). At the 1972 Olympic Games in Munich he was fourth with a Bulgarian record of 362.5 kg. Between 1973 and 1975, Kirov won the World Championships and started the era of domination of Bulgarian weightlifting: 1973 (110 + 147.5 = 257.5 kg), 1974 (110 + 145 = 255 kg) and 1975 (110 + 145 = 255 kg). His last World championships was in Stuttgart 1977 when he finishеd 9th. He competed in the 1968 and 1972 Summer Olympics and placed seventh and fifth, respectively.
