= Pierre Gourrier =

French weightlifter

Personal information
- Nationality: French
- Born: 2 March 1947 (age 78); Nancy, France

Sport
- Sport: Weightlifting

Pierre Gourrier (born 2 March 1947) is a French weightlifter. He competed at the 1968 Summer Olympics, the 1972 Summer Olympics and the 1976 Summer Olympics.
