= Kalevi Lahdenranta =

Finnish weightlifter (born 1942)

Personal information
- Full name: Kalevi Johannes Lahdenranta
- Born: 20 March 1942 (age 84) Kankaanpää, Finland
- Height: 1.92 m (6 ft 4 in)
- Weight: 130–140 kg (287–309 lb)

Sport
- Sport: Weightlifting
Medal record
Men's weightlifting
Representing Finland
World Championships
Bronze medal – third place	1970 Columbus	110+ kg
European Championships
Silver medal – second place	1970 Szombathely	110+ kg

Kalevi Johannes Lahdenranta (born 20 March 1942) is a retired Finnish weightlifter. He competed at the 1968 and 1972 Summer Olympics in the heavyweight and super heavyweight categories, respectively, and finished in seventh place in both games. In 1970, he won a bronze and a silver medal at the world and European championships. He set four world records in the snatch between 1970 and 1974.
