= Rainer Dörrzapf =

German weightlifter (1950–2026)

Personal information
- Nationality: German
- Born: 6 March 1950 Ludwigshafen, Rhineland-Palatinate, West Germany
- Died: 3 July 2026 (aged 76)

Sport
- Sport: Weightlifting

Rainer Dörrzapf (6 March 1950 – 3 July 2026) was a German weightlifter. He competed at the 1968 Summer Olympics and the 1972 Summer Olympics.

Dörrzapt died on 3 July 2026, at the age of 76.
