= Mukharby Kirzhinov =

Soviet weightlifter (1949–2026)

Personal information
- Born: 1 January 1949 Koshekhabl, Adyghe Autonomous Oblast, Russian SFSR, Soviet Union
- Died: 11 January 2026 (aged 77)

Sport
- Sport: Weightlifting

Mukharby Nurbiyevich Kirzhinov (Russian: Мухарби Нурбиевич Киржинов; 1 January 1949 – 11 January 2026) was a Soviet weightlifter from Adygea, Olympic champion and world champion. Of Circassian ancestry, he won the gold medal in the lightweight class at the 1972 Summer Olympics in Munich.

Kirzhinov died on 11 January 2026, at the age of 77.
