= János Hanzlik =

Hungarian weightlifter (born 1943)

Personal information
- Nationality: Hungarian
- Born: 14 April 1943 (age 81); Oroszlány, Hungary

Sport
- Sport: Weightlifting

János Hanzlik (born 14 April 1943) is a Hungarian weightlifter. He competed in the men's heavyweight event at the 1972 Summer Olympics.
