= Frank Zielecke =

German weightlifter

Franklin Zielecke
Personal information
- Nationality: German
- Born: 12 June 1946 (age 78); Berlin, Germany

Sport
- Sport: Weightlifting

Franklin Zielecke (born 12 June 1946) is a German weightlifter. He competed in the men's middleweight event at the 1972 Summer Olympics.
