= Manfred Rieger =

German weightlifter (born 1941)

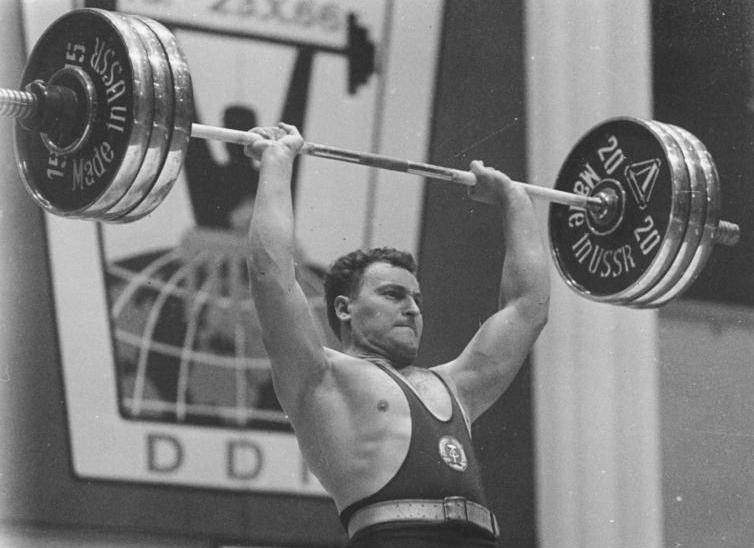
- Manfred Rieger in 1971

Personal information
- Born: 25 April 1941 (age 85) Zittau, Germany
- Height: 1.84 m (6 ft 0 in)
- Weight: 104–126 kg (229–278 lb)

Sport
- Sport: Weightlifting
- Club: SG Robur Zittau
Medal record
Men's weightlifting
Representing East Germany
European Championships
| Bronze medal – third place | 1966 East Berlin | 110+ kg |
| Bronze medal – third place | 1968 Leningrad | 110+ kg |
| Bronze medal – third place | 1969 Warsaw | 110+ kg |
| Bronze medal – third place | 1970 Szombathely | 110+ kg |

Manfred Rieger (born 25 April 1941) is a retired German weightlifter. He competed in three consecutive Summer Olympics, as heavyweight in 1964 and 1968 and super heavyweight in 1972, and finished in eleventh, fourth and fifth place, respectively. Between 1966 and 1970 he won a bronze medal in the super heavyweight category at every European championship (the championships were not conducted in 1967).
