= Werner Dittrich =

German weightlifter

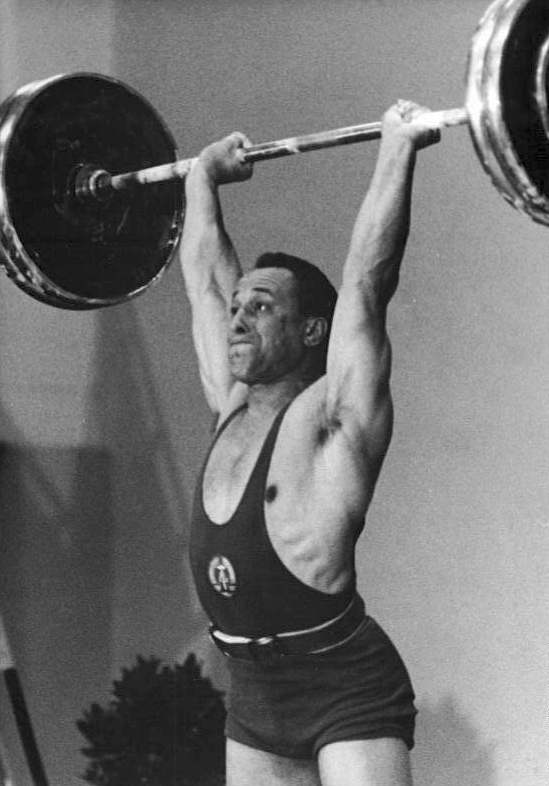
- Werner Dittrich in 1972

Personal information
- Born: 9 June 1937 (age 89) Reichenau, Germany (modern Bogatynia, Poland)
- Height: 1.66 m (5 ft 5 in)
- Weight: 67–74 kg (148–163 lb)

Sport
- Sport: Weightlifting
- Club: SG Robur Zittau
Medal record
Representing East Germany
World Championships
| Silver medal – second place | 1965 Tehran | Middleweight; 140+130+167.5 kg |
| Bronze medal – third place | 1966 East Berlin | Middleweight; 140+132.5+170 kg |
European Championships
| Bronze medal – third place | 1964 Moscow | Middleweight; 135+125+160 kg |
| Silver medal – second place | 1965 Sofia | Middleweight; 137.5+130+165 kg |
| Bronze medal – third place | 1966 East Berlin | Middleweight; 140+132.5+170 kg |
| Bronze medal – third place | 1968 Leningrad | Middleweight; 145+135+165 kg |

Werner Dittrich (born 9 June 1937) is a retired German weightlifter. He competed at the 1960, 1964, 1968 and 1972 Summer Olympics, first in the lightweight (1960) and later in the middleweight category. His best achievement was sixth place in 1968. Between 1964 and 1968 he won two silver and four bronze medals at European and world championships.
