= Jan Wojnowski =

Polish weightlifter

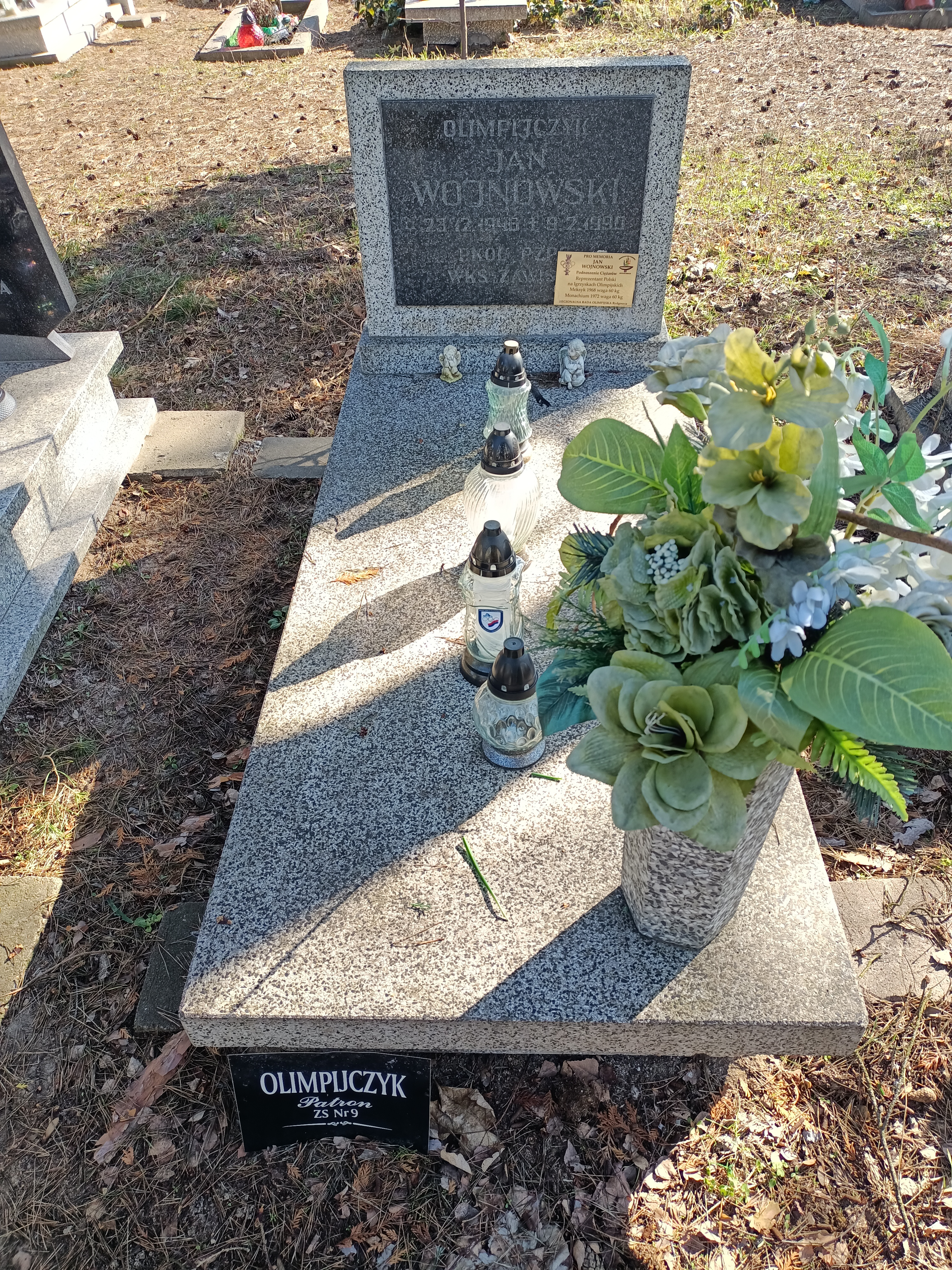
- Jan Wojnowski's grave

Personal information
- Nationality: Polish
- Born: 23 December 1946 Torzewo
- Died: 9 February 1990 (aged 43) Bydgoszcz

Sport
- Sport: Weightlifting

Jan Wojnowski (23 December 1946 in Torzewo - 9 February 1990 in Bydgoszcz) was a Polish weightlifter. Among his achievements was a fourth place at the 1968 Summer Olympics, and a bronze medal at the 1973 World Championships.
