= Vasily Kolotov =

Russian weightlifter

Vasily Fyodorovich Kolotov (Russian: Василий Фёдорович Колотов, October 6, 1944 – June 5, 2001) was a Russian weightlifter who competed for the Soviet Union.

At the 1970 World Championships in Columbus, Ohio, United States, he won the 90 kg class by 47.5 kg and set new world records in the clean and jerk and in the total. He was pronounced the man of the weight class for years to come, however his star soon faded as his compatriot David Rigert, who moved up from the 82.5 kg class, started to eclipse him by the end of the year.

Despite this, weightlifters have remembered the standards that Kolotov set in the early 1970s.

== Weightlifting achievements ==
- Senior World Champion (1970);
- Silver Medalist in Senior World Championships (1971 and 1973);
- Silver Medalist in Senior European Championships (1970);
- Senior USSR National Champion (1969-1971);
- Set ten World records during career.
