= Weightlifting at the 1964 Summer Olympics – Men's 90 kg =

Weightlifting at the Olympics

Men's 90 kg at the Games of the XVIII Olympiad
- Venue: Shibuya Public Hall
- Date: 17 October 1964
- Competitors: 19 from 18 nations
- Winning total: 487.5 kg WR

Medalists
1st place, gold medalist(s)		Vladimir Golovanov	Soviet Union
2nd place, silver medalist(s)		Louis Martin	Great Britain
3rd place, bronze medalist(s)		Ireneusz Paliński	Poland

The men's 90 kg weightlifting competitions at the 1964 Summer Olympics in Tokyo took place on 17 October at the Shibuya Public Hall. It was the fourth appearance of the middle heavyweight class.

== Results ==
Rank	Name	Country	kg
1	Vladimir Golovanov	Soviet Union	487.5
2	Louis Martin	Great Britain	475.0
3	Ireneusz Paliński	Poland	467.5
4	William March	United States	467.5
5	Lazăr Baroga	Romania	460.0
6	Árpád Nemessányi	Hungary	460.0
7	Jouni Kailajärvi	Finland	452.5
8	Petar Tachev	Bulgaria	445.0
9	John Lewis	Canada	440.0
10	Kurt Herbst	Austria	437.5
11	Sadık Pekünlü	Turkey	435.0
12	Cheng Sheng-teh	Chinese Taipei	430.0
13	Ingvar Asp	Sweden	422.5
14	Norbert Fehr	United Team of Germany	410.0
15	Fernando Torres	Puerto Rico	407.5
16	Graeme Hall	Australia	390.0
17	Mahmoud Shakir	Iraq	382.5
AC	Lou Riecke	United States	147.5
AC	Leong Chim Seong	Malaysia	DNF
