= Weightlifting at the 1968 Summer Olympics – Men's 90 kg =

Weightlifting at the Olympics

Men's 90 kg at the Games of the XIX Olympiad
- Venue: Teatro de los Insurgentes
- Date: 18 October 1968
- Competitors: 29 from 22 nations
- Winning total: 517.5 kg OR

Medalists
| 1st place, gold medalist(s) | | Kaarlo Kangasniemi | Finland |
| 2nd place, silver medalist(s) | | Jaan Talts | Soviet Union |
| 3rd place, bronze medalist(s) | | Marek Gołąb | Poland |

The men's 90 kg weightlifting competitions at the 1968 Summer Olympics in Mexico City took place on 18 October at the Teatro de los Insurgentes. It was the fifth appearance of the middle heavyweight class.

== Results ==
| Rank | Name | Country | kg |
|---|---|---|---|
| 1 | Kaarlo Kangasniemi | Finland | 517.5 |
| 2 | Jaan Talts | Soviet Union | 507.5 |
| 3 | Marek Gołąb | Poland | 495.0 |
| 4 | Bo Johansson | Sweden | 492.5 |
| 5 | Jaakko Kailajärvi | Finland | 485.0 |
| 6 | Árpád Nemessányi | Hungary | 482.5 |
| 7 | Phil Grippaldi | United States | 477.5 |
| 8 | Vítězslav Országh | Czechoslovakia | 462.5 |
| 9 | Bart Bartholomew | United States | 457.5 |
| 10 | Pierre Gourrier | France | 455.0 |
| 11 | Bakr Bassam | Egypt | 455.0 |
| 12 | Yun Seog-won | South Korea | 455.0 |
| 13 | Jean-Pierre Van Lerberghe | Belgium | 447.5 |
| 14 | Stergios Tsoukas | Greece | 435.0 |
| 15 | Efrain Gusquiza | Peru | 430.0 |
| 16 | Andrés Martínez | Cuba | 427.5 |
| 17 | Gaber Hafez | Egypt | 425.0 |
| 18 | Cheng Sheng-teh | Chinese Taipei | 425.0 |
| 19 | Leong Chim Seong | Malaysia | 422.5 |
| 20 | Sylvanus Blackman | Great Britain | 420.0 |
| 21 | Paul Bjarnason | Canada | 407.5 |
| 22 | Fernando Torres | Puerto Rico | 405.0 |
| 23 | Fernando Esquivel | Costa Rica | 370.0 |
| AC | Oscar Nobua | Argentina | 125.0 |
| AC | Óskar Sigurpálsson | Iceland | 145.0 |
| AC | Louis Martin | Great Britain | 305.0 |
| AC | Juan Benavides | Cuba | DNF |
| AC | Géza Tóth | Hungary | DNF |
| AC | Alfred Steiner | France | DNF |
