= Tsoukas =

Tsoukas is a surname. Notable people with the surname include:

- Haridimos Tsoukas (born 1961), Greek theorist on organization and leadership
- Stergios Tsoukas (born 1936), Greek weightlifter
