= Norbert Fehr =

German weightlifter

Personal information
- Nationality: German
- Born: 25 May 1937 (age 87); Ludwigshafen, Germany

Sport
- Sport: Weightlifting

Norbert Fehr (born 25 May 1937) is a German weightlifter. He competed in the men's middle heavyweight event at the 1964 Summer Olympics.
