= Bart Bartholomew =

American weightlifter (1936–2021)

Personal information
- Born: February 9, 1936 Allentown, Pennsylvania, United States
- Died: June 30, 2021 (aged 85)

Sport
- Sport: Weightlifting

Robert Raymond "Bart" Bartholomew (February 9, 1936 – June 30, 2021) was an American weightlifter. He competed in the men's middle heavyweight event at the 1968 Summer Olympics.
