= Cisnădie =

Cisnădie Heltau (German)
- Town
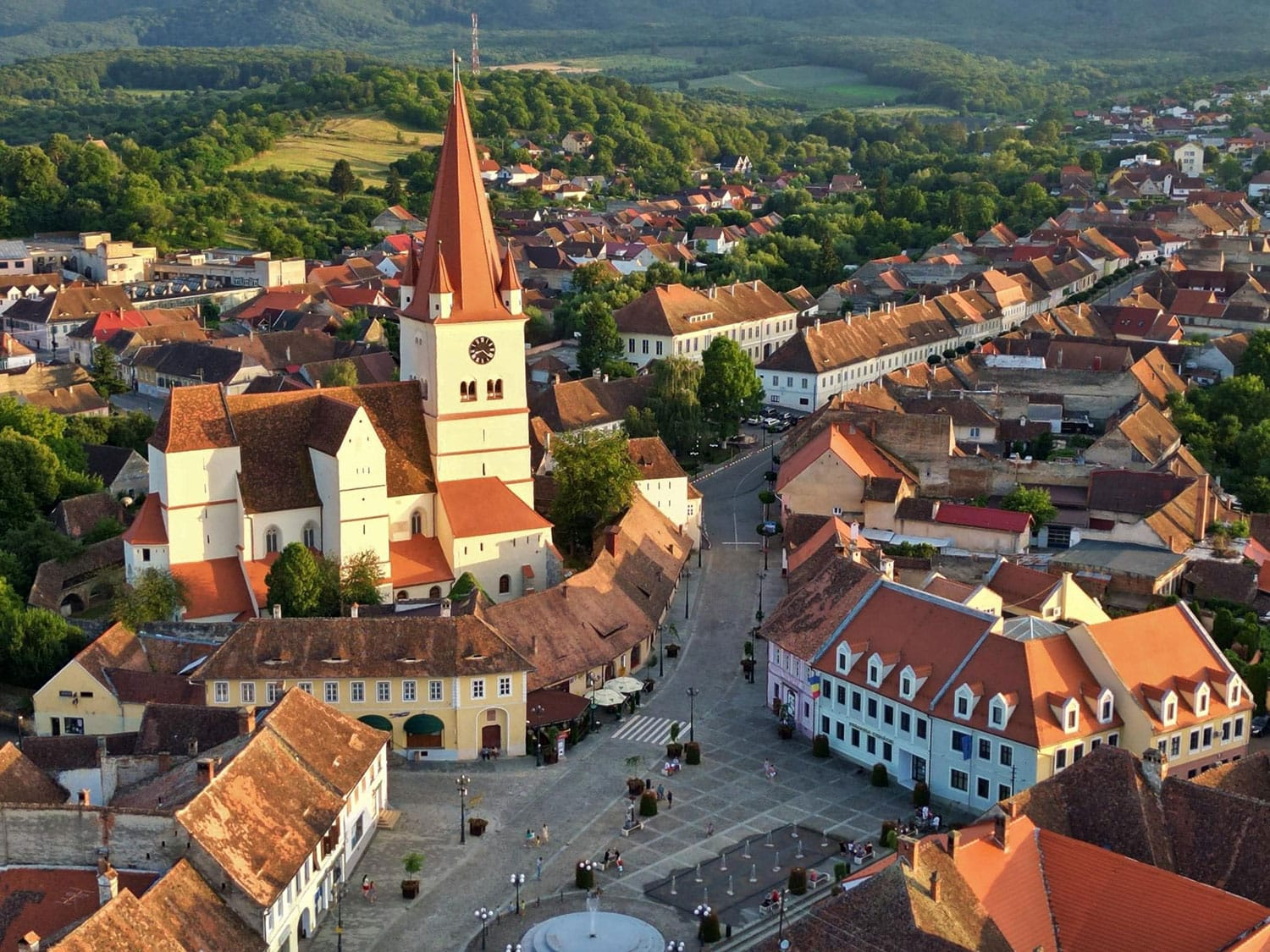
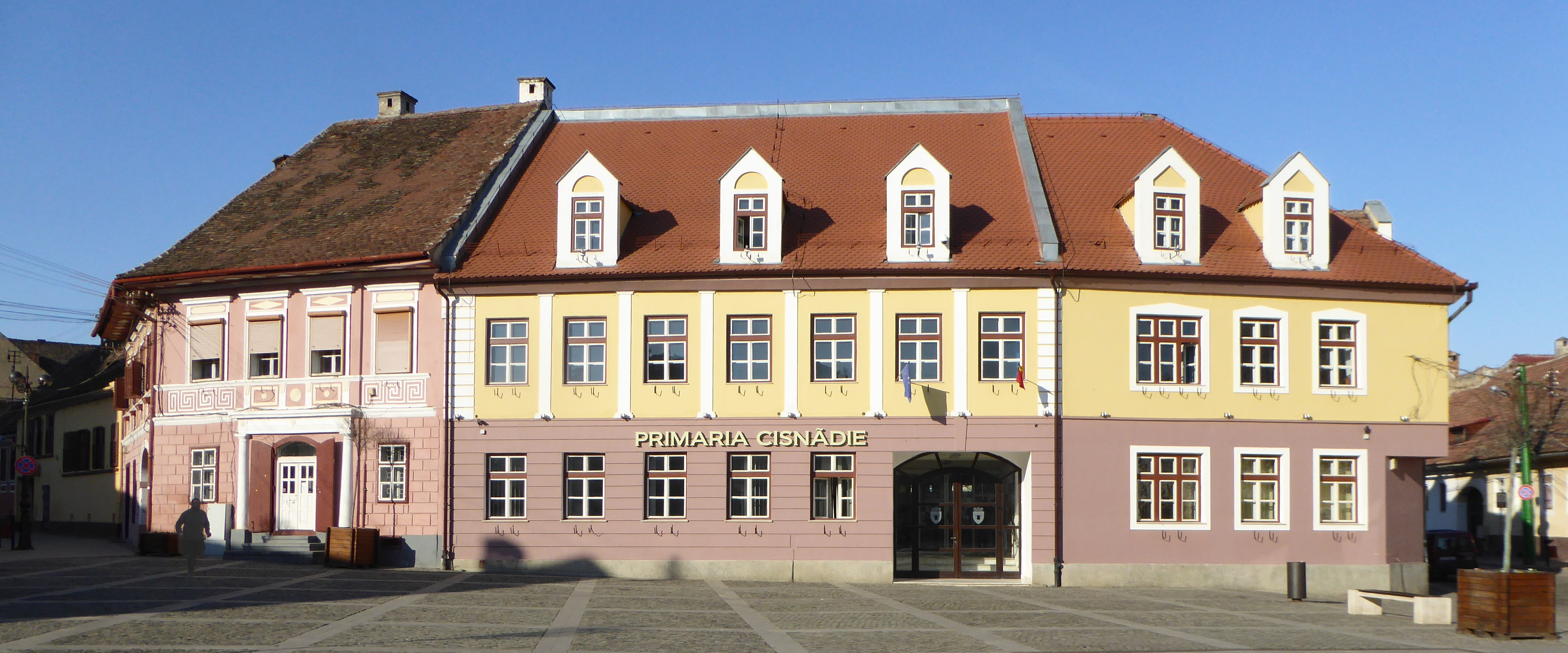
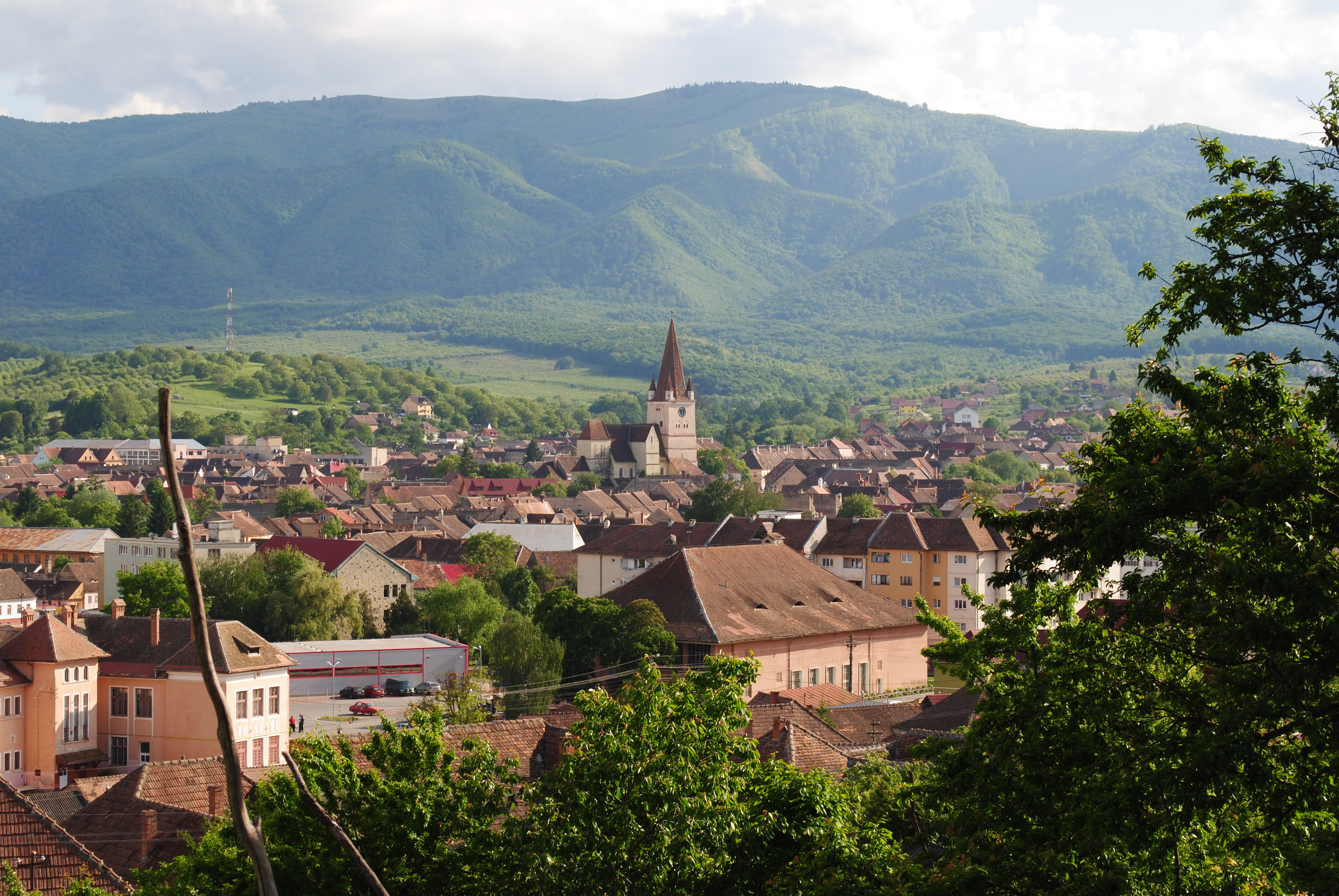
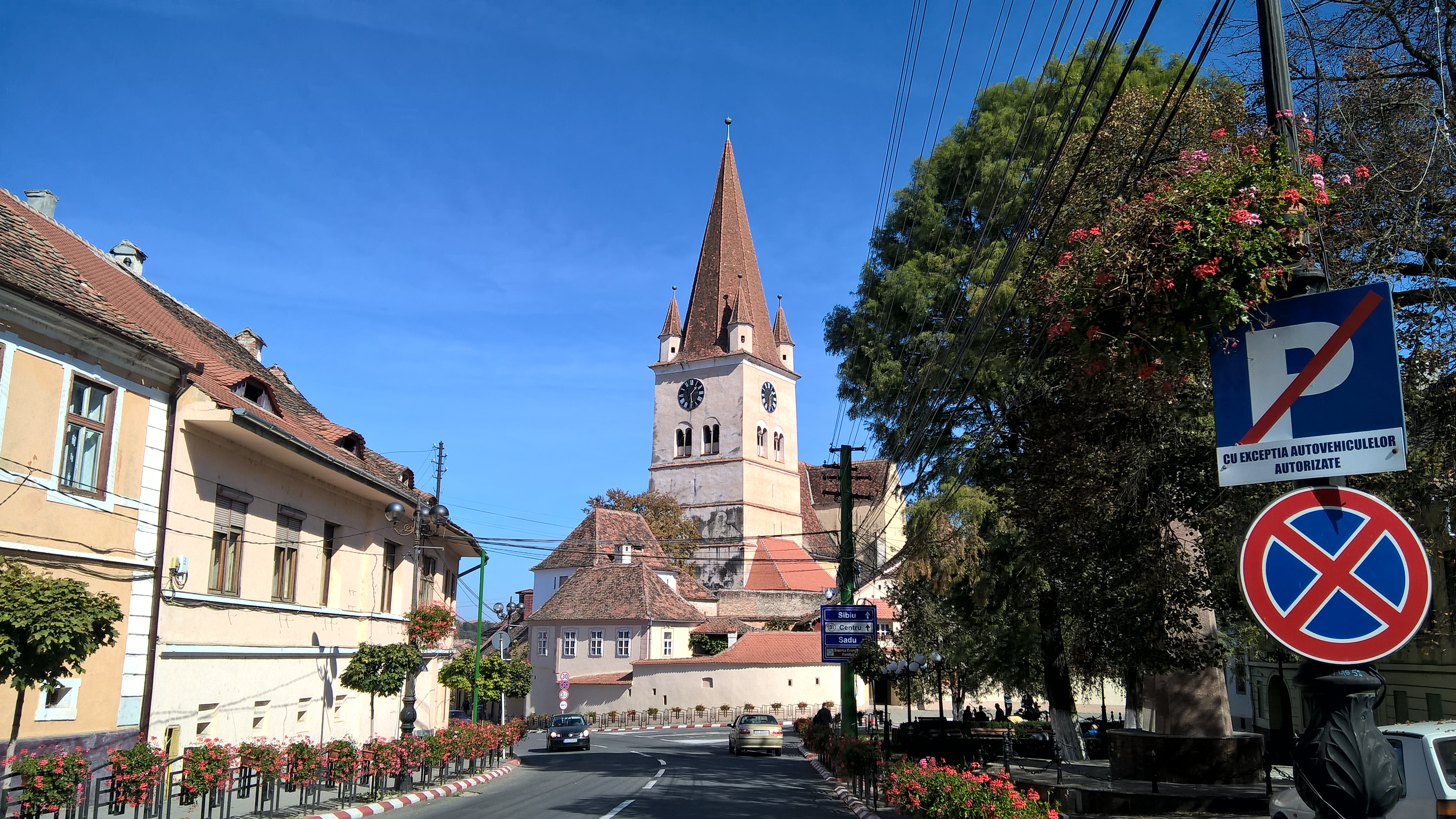
- Panorama of Cisnădie Cisnădie town hall Historic center Fortified church

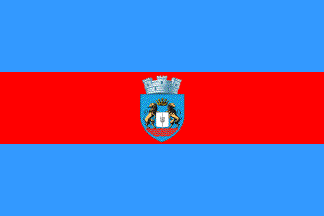
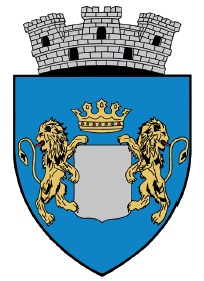
- Flag Coat of arms

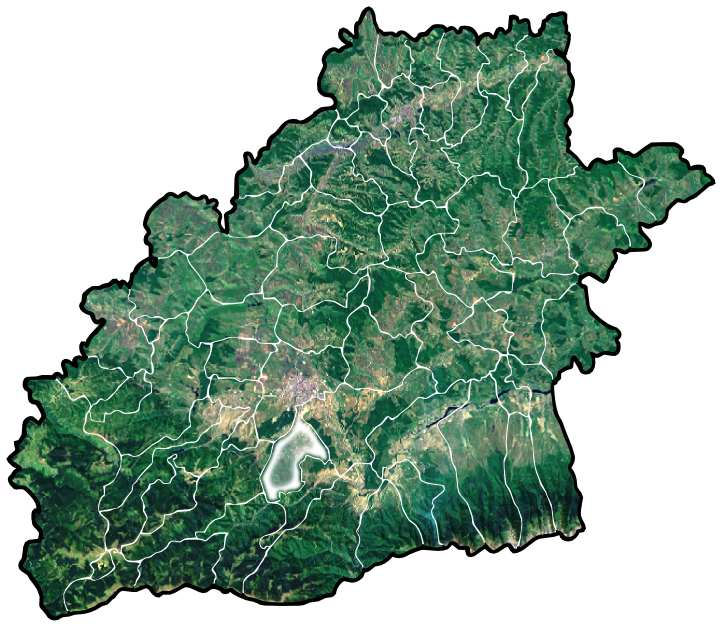
- Location in Sibiu County

- Location in Romania
- Coordinates: 45°42′46″N 24°09′03″E
- Country: Romania
- County: Sibiu

Government
  - Mayor (2024–2028): Mircea Orlățan (ADU)
- Area: 277.13 km^{2} (107.00 sq mi)
- Elevation: 454 m (1,490 ft)
- Population (2021-12-01): 22,277
  - Density: 80.385/km^{2} (208.20/sq mi)
- Time zone: UTC+02:00 (EET)
  - Summer (DST): UTC+03:00 (EEST)
- Postal code: 555300
- Area code: (+40) 02 69
- Vehicle reg.: SB
- Website: cisnadie.ro

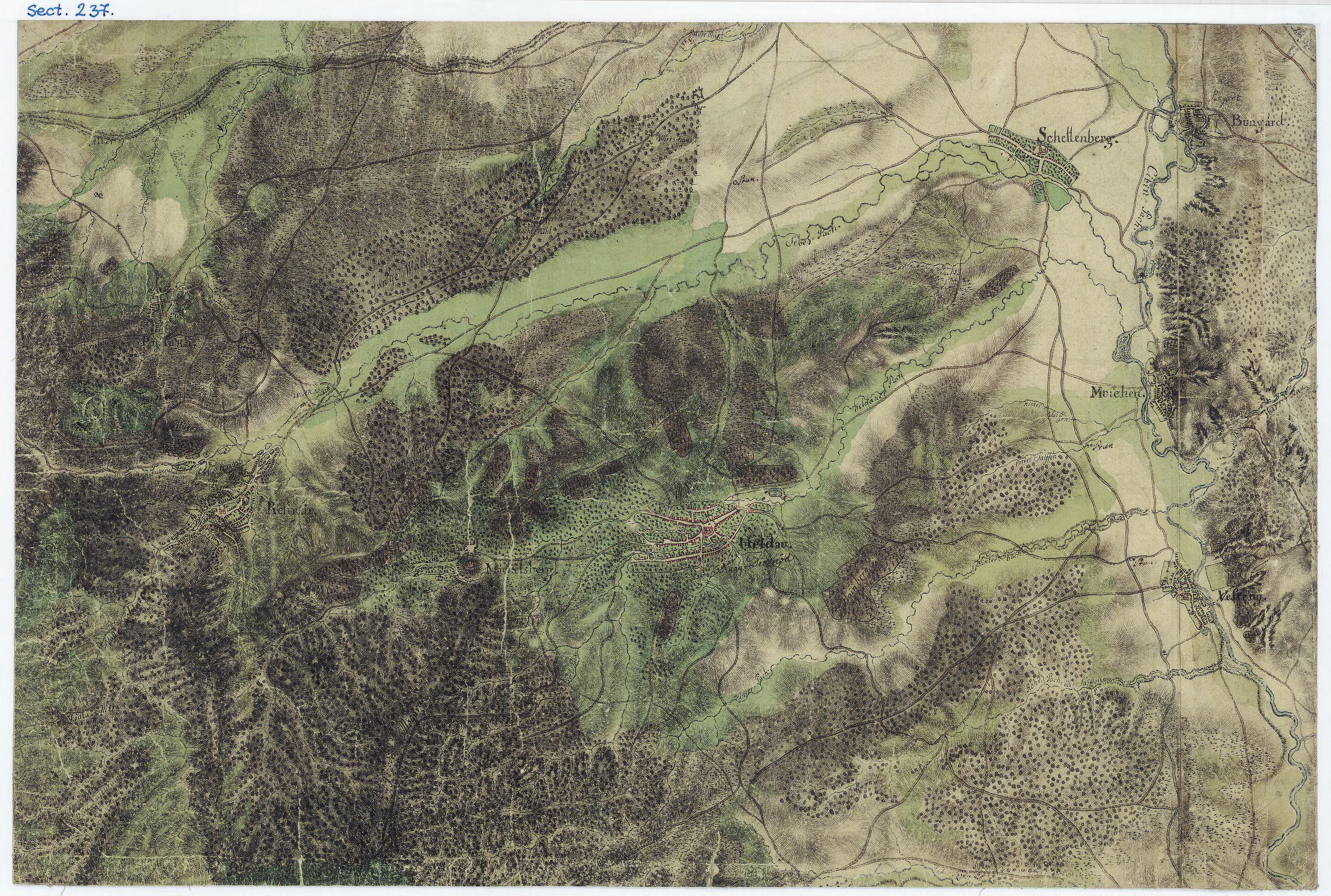
Cisnădie on the Josephine Map of Transylvania, 1769–73

Cisnădie (Romanian pronunciation: [t͡ʃisnəˈdi.e]; German: Heltau; Transylvanian Saxon dialect: De Hielt; Hungarian: Nagydisznód) is a town in Sibiu County, Transylvania, central Romania, approximately 10 kilometres (6.2 mi) south of Sibiu (German: Hermannstadt). It comprises the main town of Cisnădie and one village, Cisnădioara (German: Michelsberg; Hungarian: Kisdisznód).

Located along the Cisnădie River, at the foothills of the Cindrel Mountains, the town is known for its Transylvanian Saxon heritage, as well as for the communist-era carpet factories.

== History ==
Cisnădie was mentioned for the first time in a document from the year 1204 under the name "Rivetel". In the 12th century Saxon colonists settled here and in 1323 the German name Heltau is mentioned. The town flourished, particularly the guilds of blacksmiths and wool weavers (weaving remained the traditional occupation of the town population until the 20th century, when large textile factories were built).

Cisnădie shared most of Transylvania's eventful history. The town suffered several raids, starting with the 1241 raid of the Mongols and continuing with Ottoman attacks. The plague did not spare the town, neither did the fire nor various political agitations throughout the passing of time.

In 1806, under Emperor Franz of Austria, Cisnădie/Heltau renewed its market rights, thus enabling it to prosper.

In 1945, large parts of the German population were deported to the Soviet Union.

In 1948, all factories were nationalized by the communist regime. After its downfall in 1989, most of the factories collapsed. Since the 2000s onwards, the economic situation has been ameliorating.

In 2007, in the northern part of the town, which borders Sibiu, a new neighborhood began to develop, called the Architects' Quarter. It occupies an area of over 90 hectares and has a population of approximately 5,200 people.

== Demographics ==
Historical population
Year	Pop.	±%
1948	7,284	—
1956	12,246	+68.1%
1966	14,979	+22.3%
1977	20,135	+34.4%
1992	17,807	−11.6%
2002	17,204	−3.4%
2011	14,282	−17.0%
2021	22,277	+56.0%
Source: Census data

According to the 2011 census, there was a total population of 14,282 people living in the town. Of these, 97.1% were ethnic Romanians, 1.5% ethnic Germans (more specifically Transylvanian Saxons), 0.7% Hungarians, and 0.3% Romani. At the 2021 census, Cisnădie had 22,277 inhabitants, of which 83.5% were Romanians and 14.8% of unknown ethnicity.

== Administration and local politics ==
=== Town council ===
In 2024, Mircea Orlățan of the United Right Alliance (ADU) party was elected mayor.

The town's current local council has the following multi-party political composition, based on the results of the votes cast at the 2024 Romanian local elections.

Party	Seats	Current Council
United Right Alliance (ADU)	7	
National Liberal Party (PNL)	5	
Social Democratic Party (PSD)	3	
Alliance for the Union of Romanians (AUR)	2	
Democratic Forum of Germans in Romania (FDGR/DFDR)	1	
Green Party (Romania) (PV)	1	

== Natives ==
- Teodora Albon (born 1977), football referee
- Lazăr Baroga (1937–2000), Olympic weightlifter
- Gáspár Heltai (c. 1510–1574), writer and printer
- Gabriela Timar (born 1986), boxer
- Gheorghe Ucenescu (1830–1896), singer, teacher, and the presumed author of Deșteaptă-te, române!

== Economy ==
In Cisnădie, there is the SC Pralin SRL, the chocolate factory of Florin Bălan.

== Sights ==
The most important architectural sight of Cisnădie is the fortified complex located in the town centre. Originally built in the 12th century as a Romanesque basilica, the church was fortified during the 15th century, after the 1493 Turkish invasion, to protect the local population of Saxons against repeated Ottoman raids. The fortification process included the construction of fortified towers over the two side entrances and the choir, the building of a double structure of defence walls, a moat and several defensive towers along the walls. Simultaneously to the fortification work the church itself suffered a gothicization process. The altar inside the Lutheran church, which forms the centre of this complex, is a wing altar/triptych from 1520, realised by the school of Veit Stoss Jr.

The complex is very well preserved and besides being a medieval architectural place of interest, it offers a variety of theme exhibitions:

- The "Cisnădie/Heltau throughout 12 centuries" Museum located over the old ossuary.
- The Museum of Medieval Defensive Structures located in the northern side tower.
- The Museum of the History of the Communist Era.
- Some alternating art expositions.

== Cisnădioara village ==
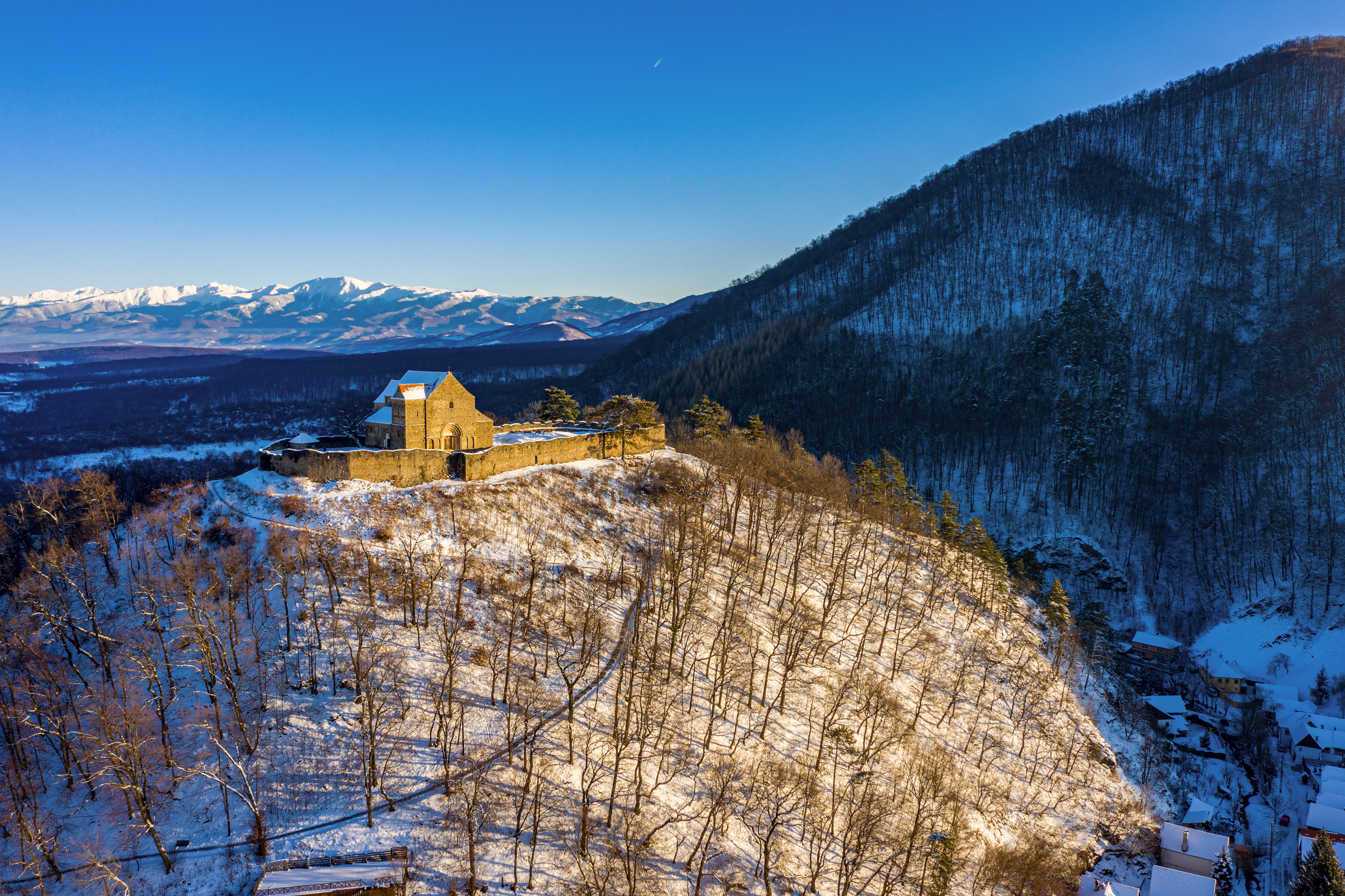
The medieval fortified Evangelical Lutheran church of the local Transylvanian Saxon community in Cisnădioara (overview from January 2020)

Cisnădioara (German: Michelsberg; Hungarian: Kisdisznód; Transylvanian Saxon dialect: Mächelsbärch) is a village located 2 km (1.2 mi) west of Cisnădie. Initially, it was listed as one of the ten possessions of the Cistercian abbey at Cârța. The fortified church, dedicated to Saint Michael and built entirely of stone, was first referred to in a document dated 20 November 1223, which mentioned its donation to the abbey. The oldest Romanesque style church in Romania, it stands atop a 100 m (330 ft) high hill, surrounded by circular fortifications, with a defensive turret above the entrance.

Some of the original walls have been preserved to this day. The layout of the church, composed of a small basilica with three naves, as well as the decoration of the carved western entrance portal, dating from 1260, attest to the strong influence of Rhineland architecture. Another church in the valley, dedicated to Saint Mary, was first mentioned in 1428 as a Gothic style church, but it was rebuilt in the 18th century in the Baroque style.

== Image gallery ==
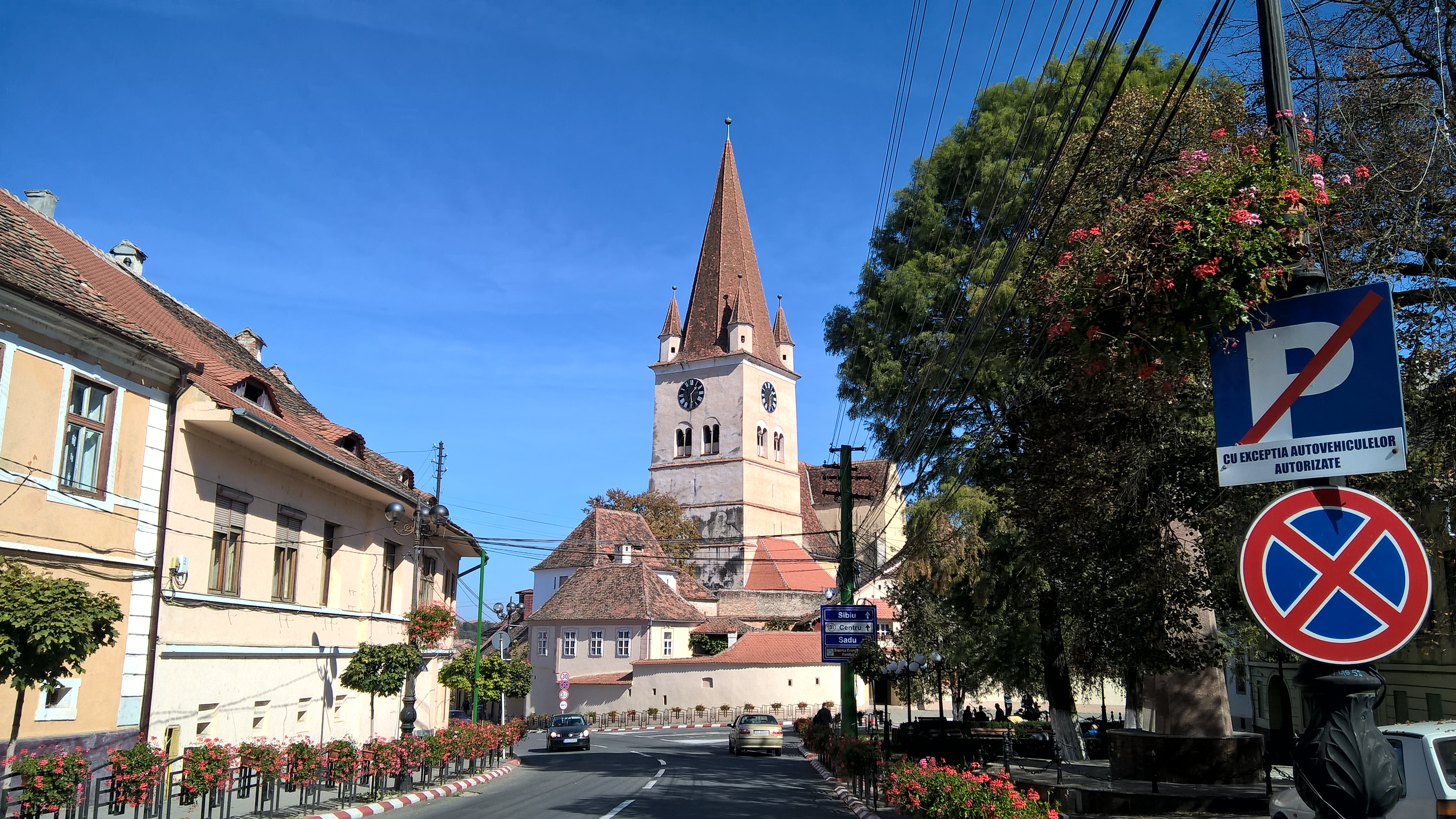
The road to the medieval Evangelical Lutheran fortified church of the local Transylvanian Saxon community in Cisnădie

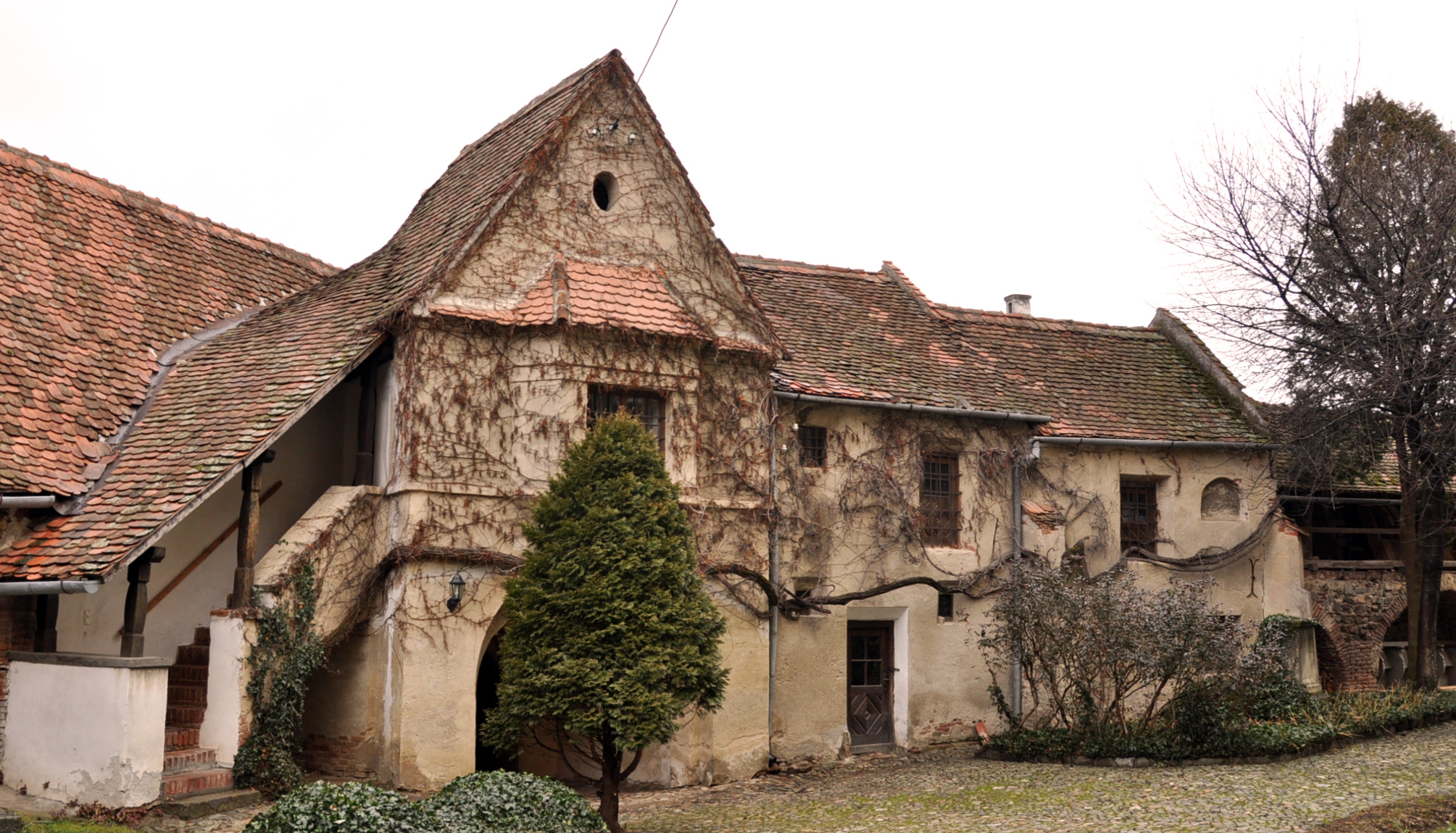
The inner courtyard of the medieval Evangelical Lutheran fortified church of the local Transylvanian Saxon community in Cisnădie

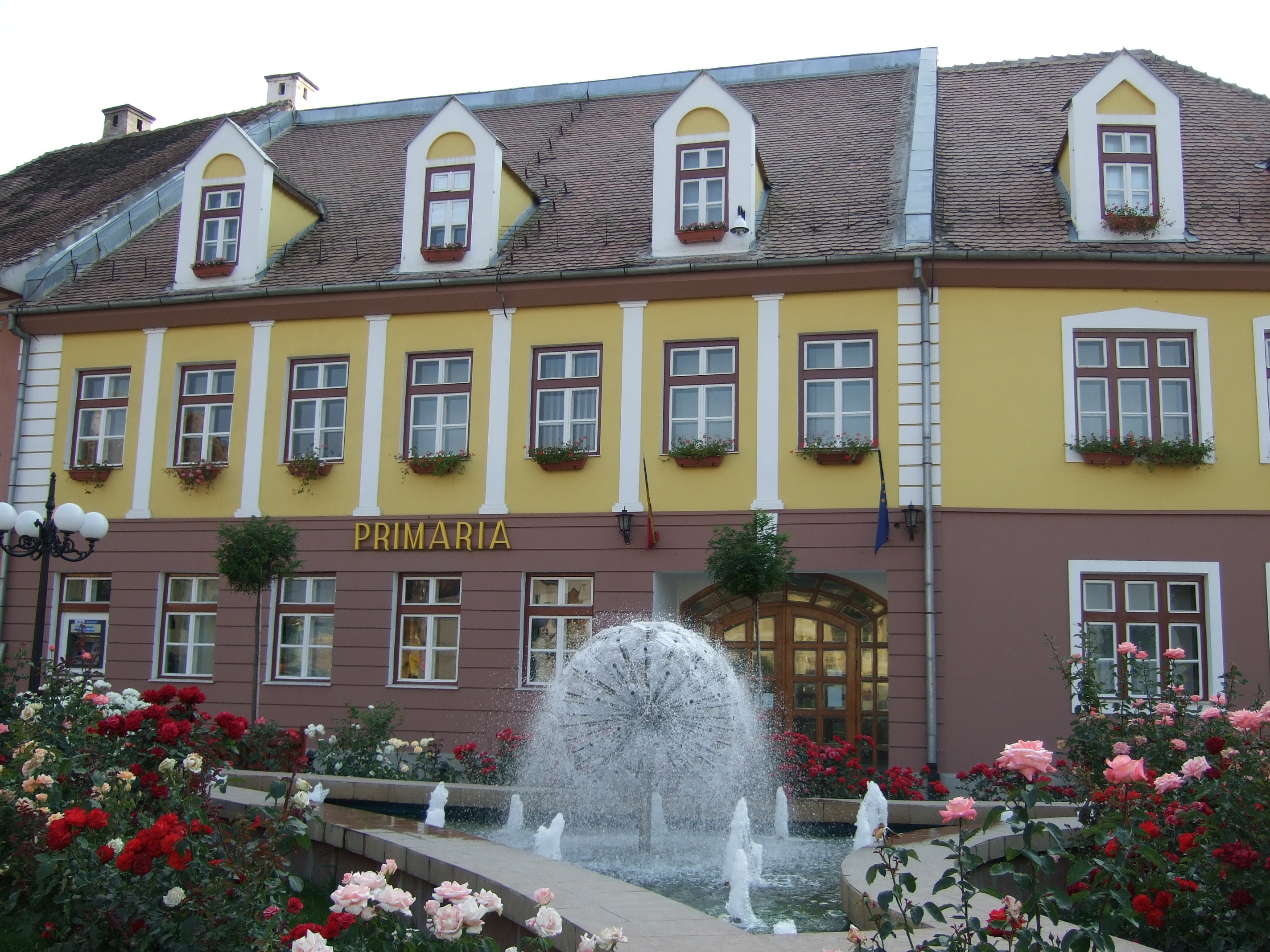
Cisnădie town hall

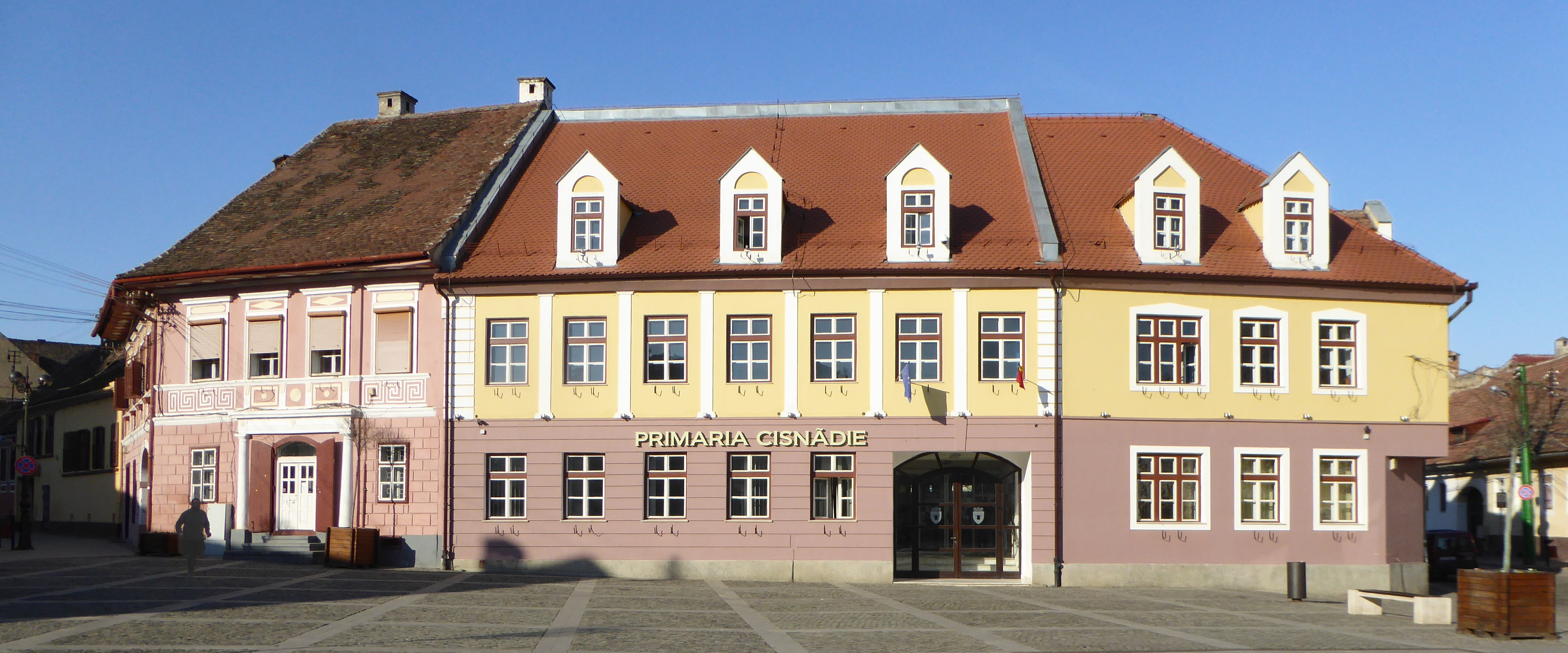
Cisnădie town hall

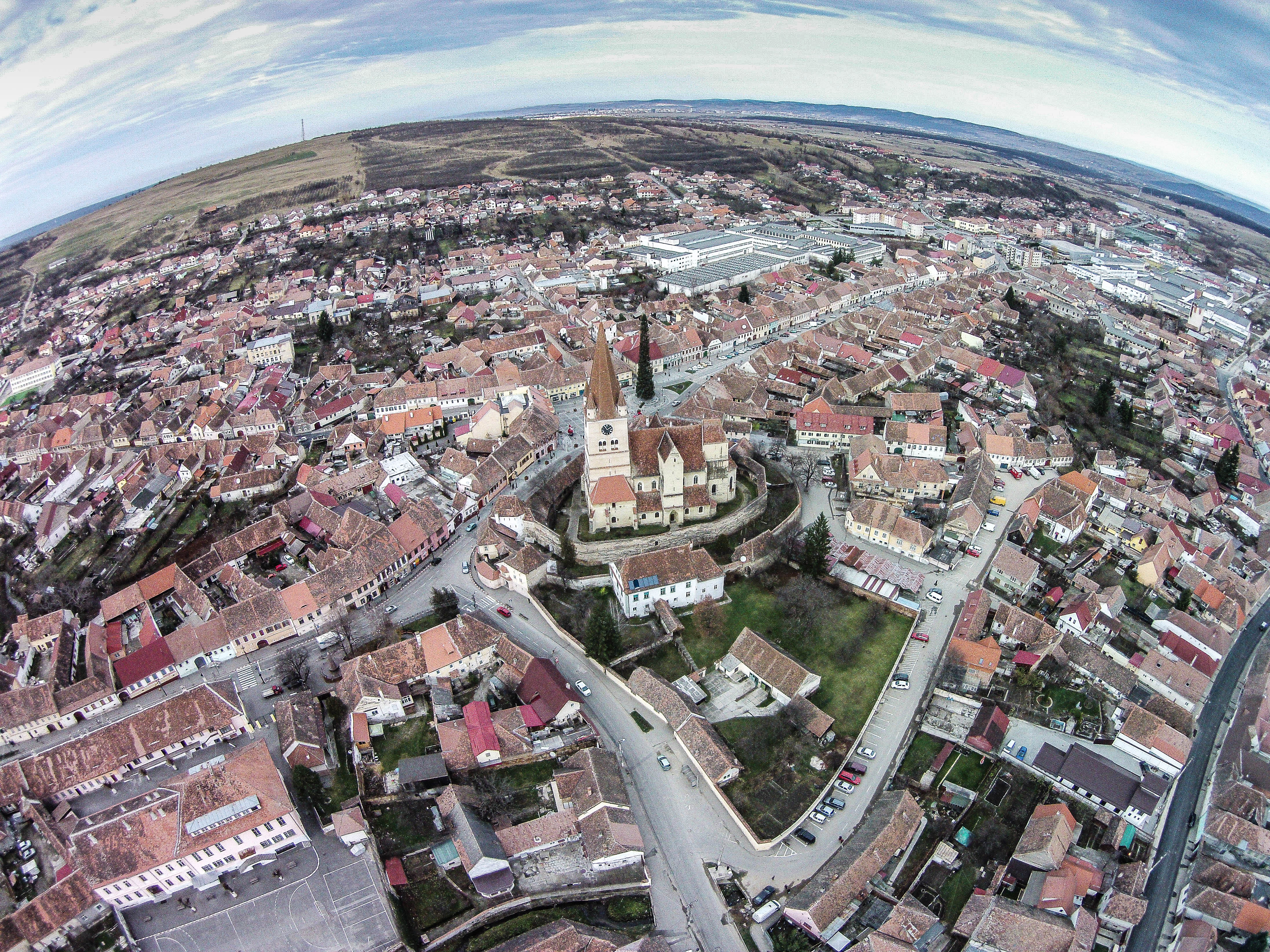
Aerial view of Cisnădie

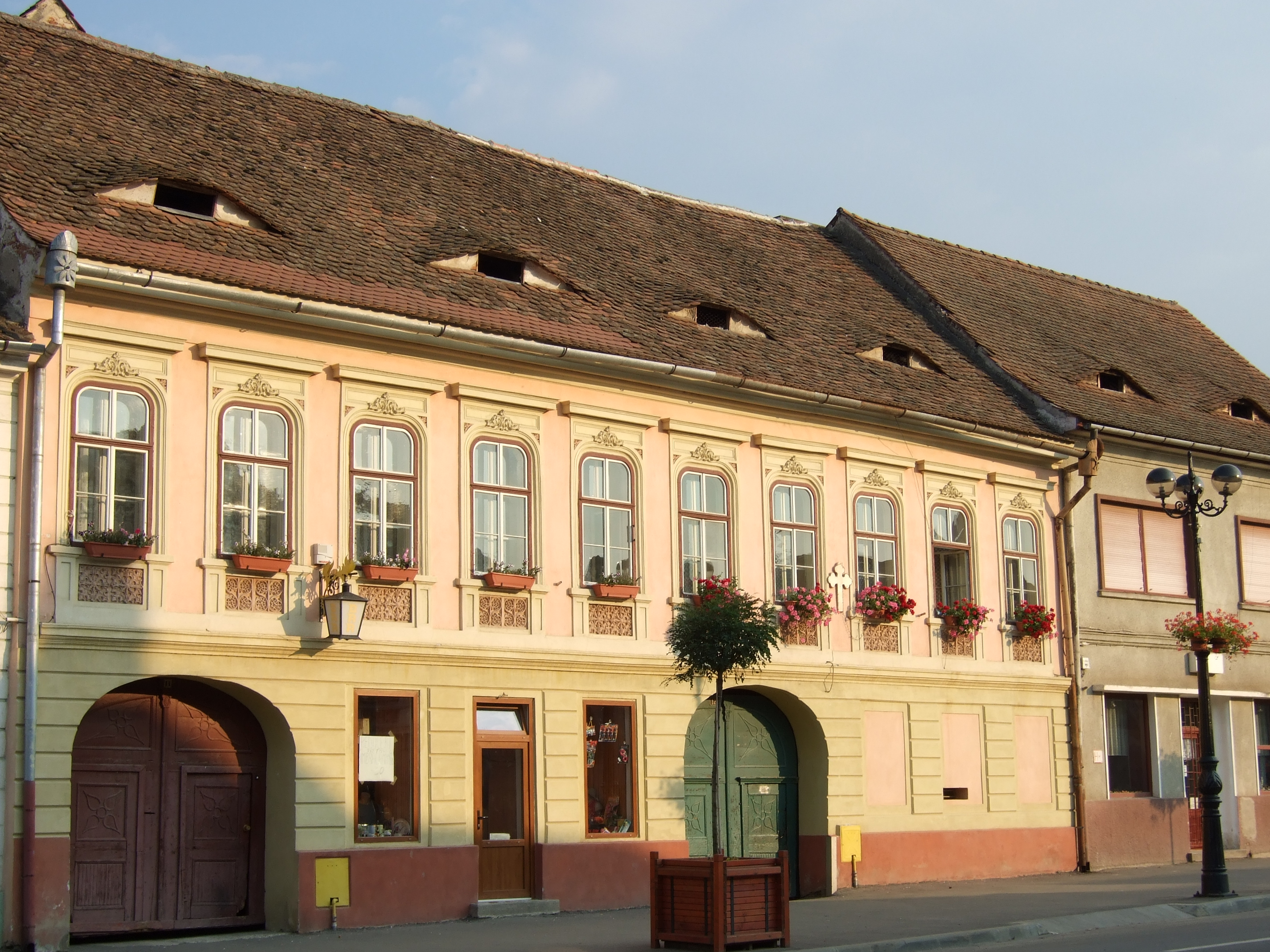
Main street in Cisnădie

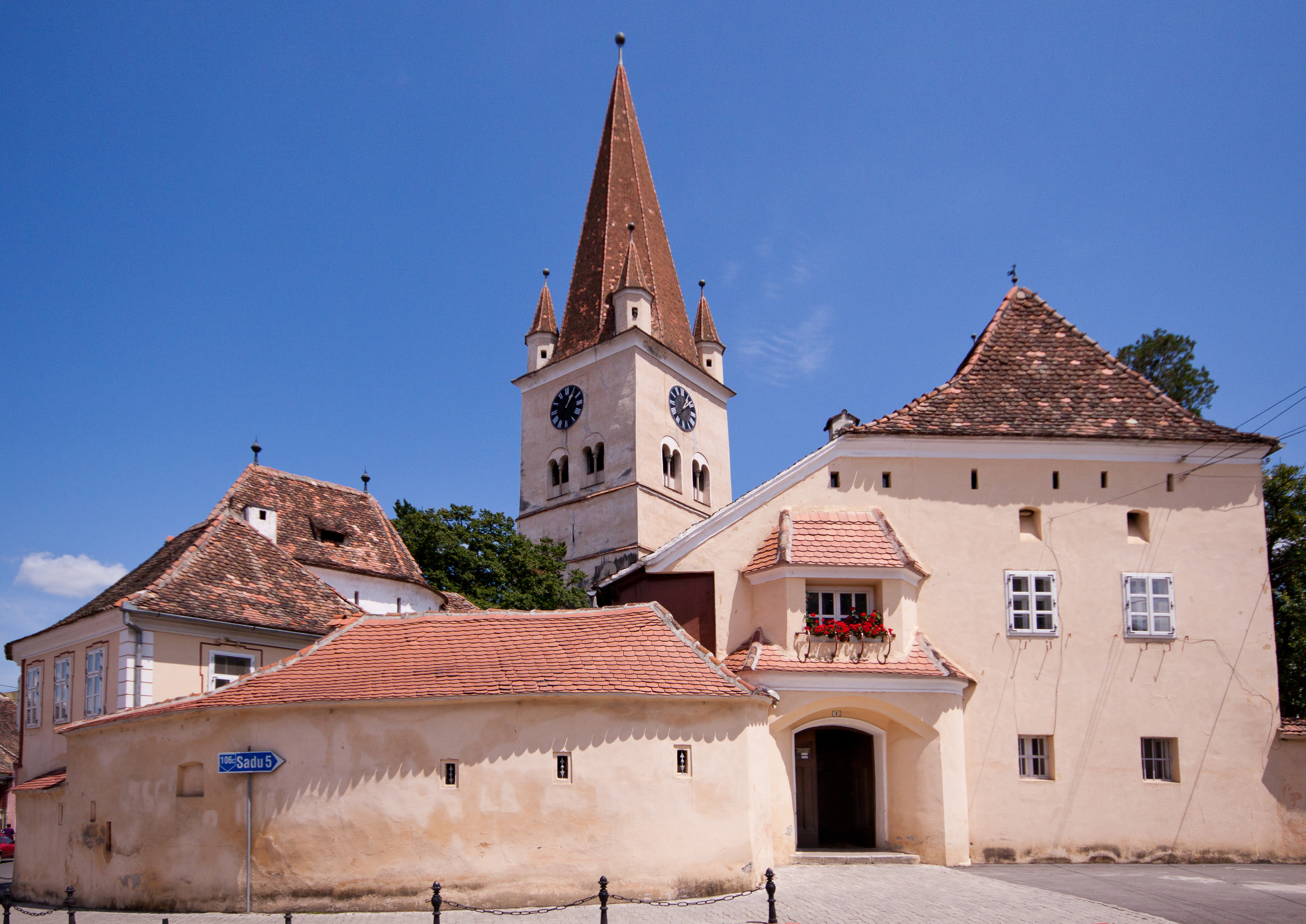
The fortified church

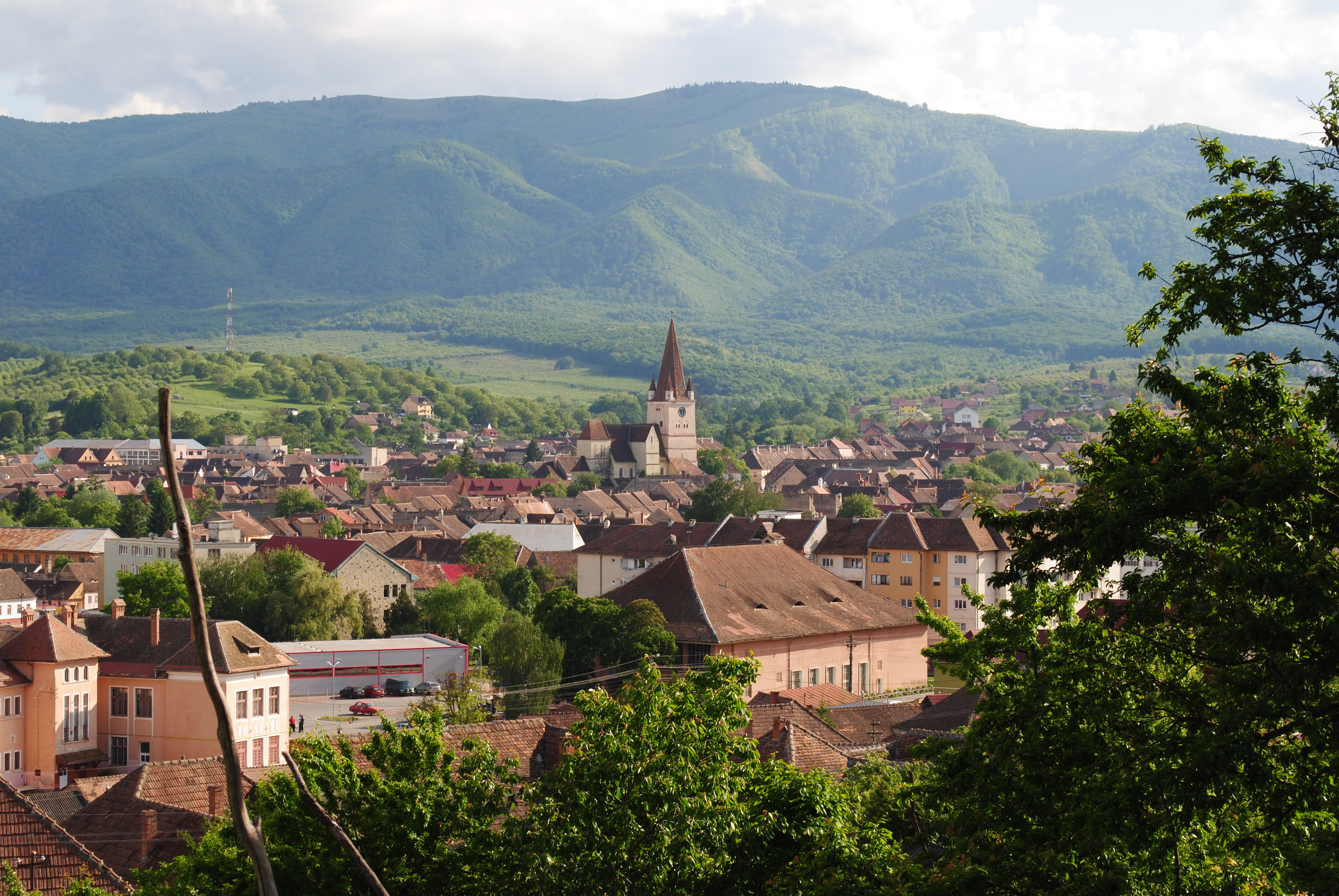
Historical centre of Cisnădie

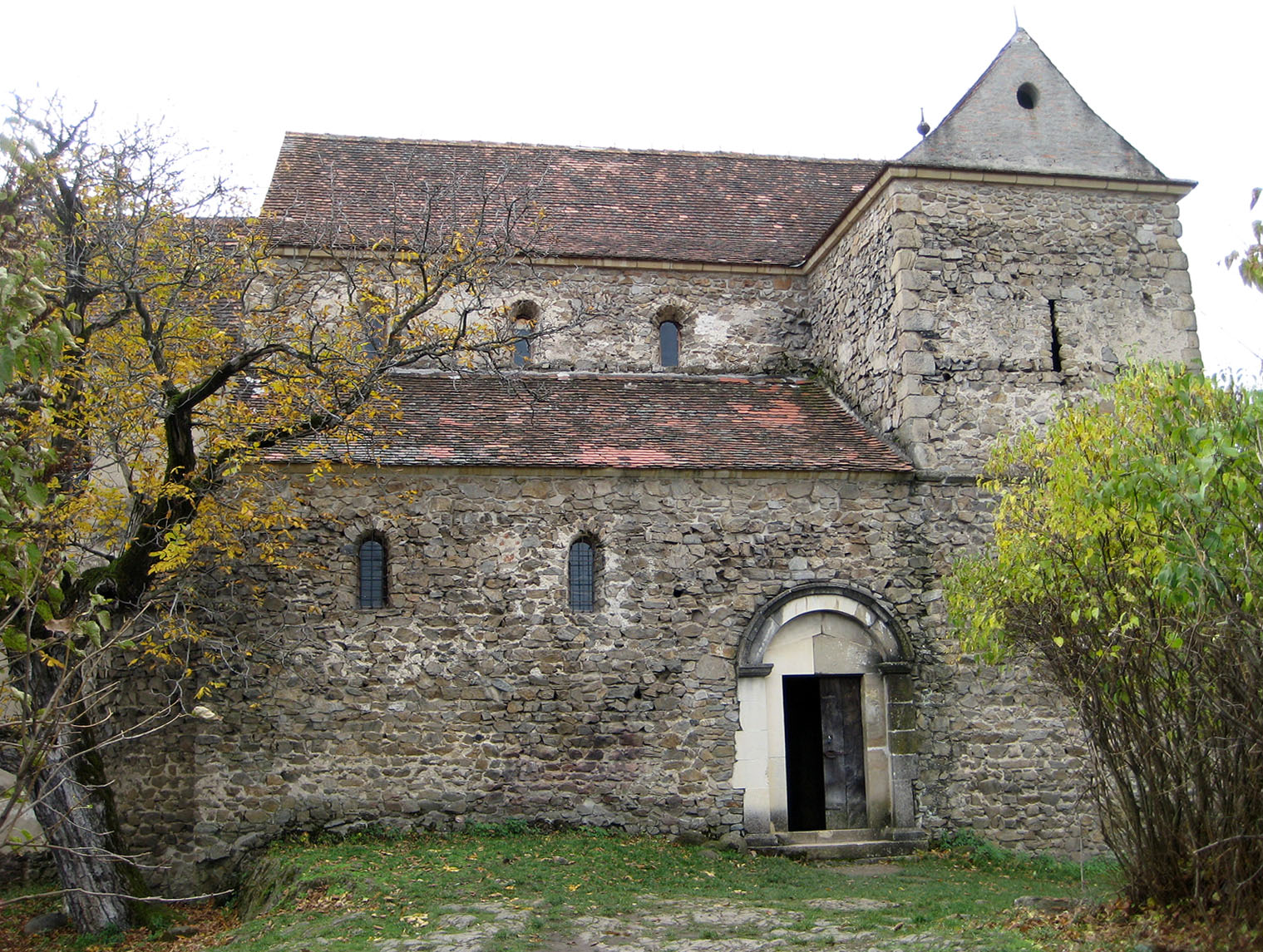
The Romanesque church of Cisnădioara, built in the second half of the 12th century

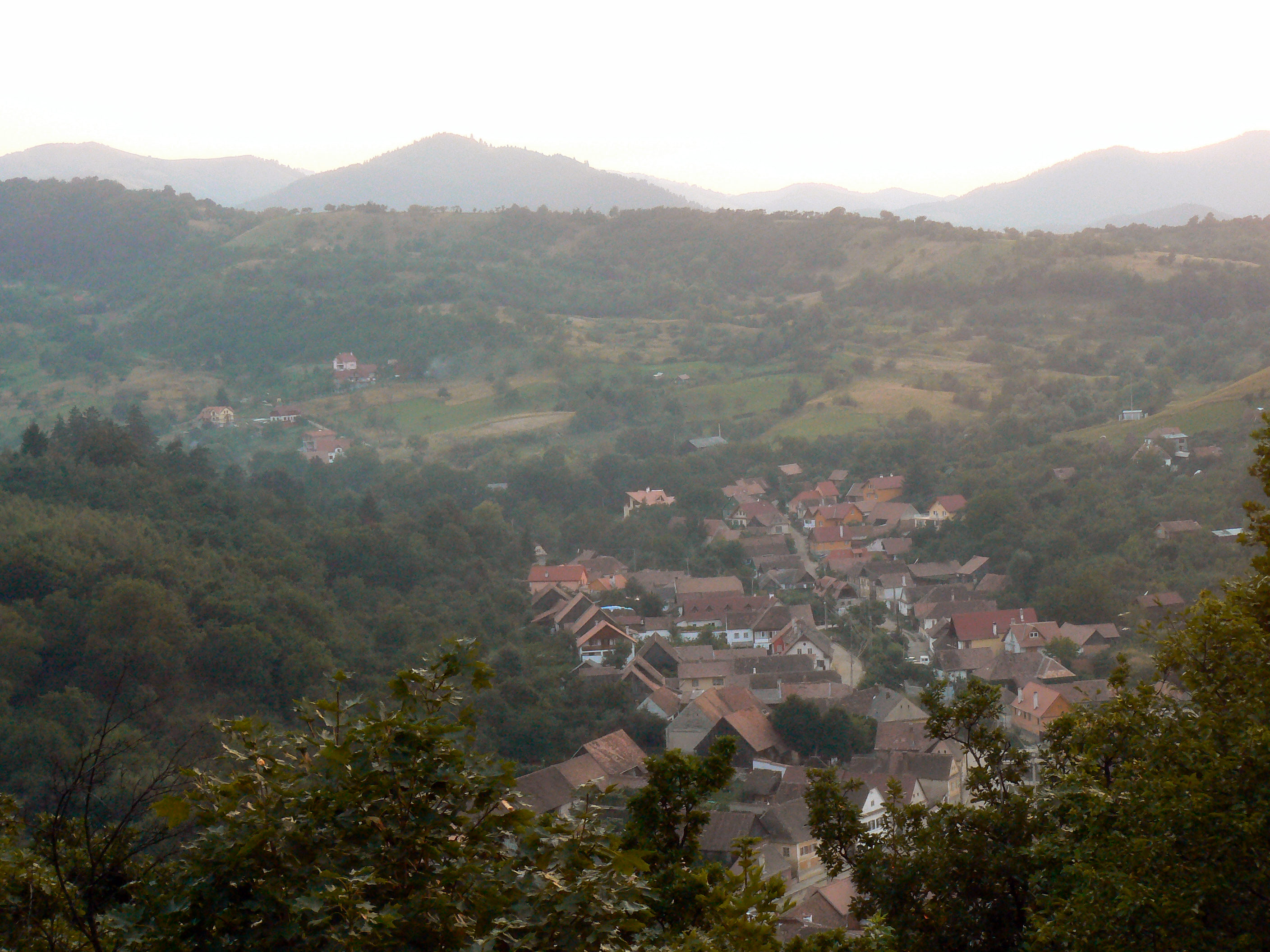
Panorama of Cisnădioara village

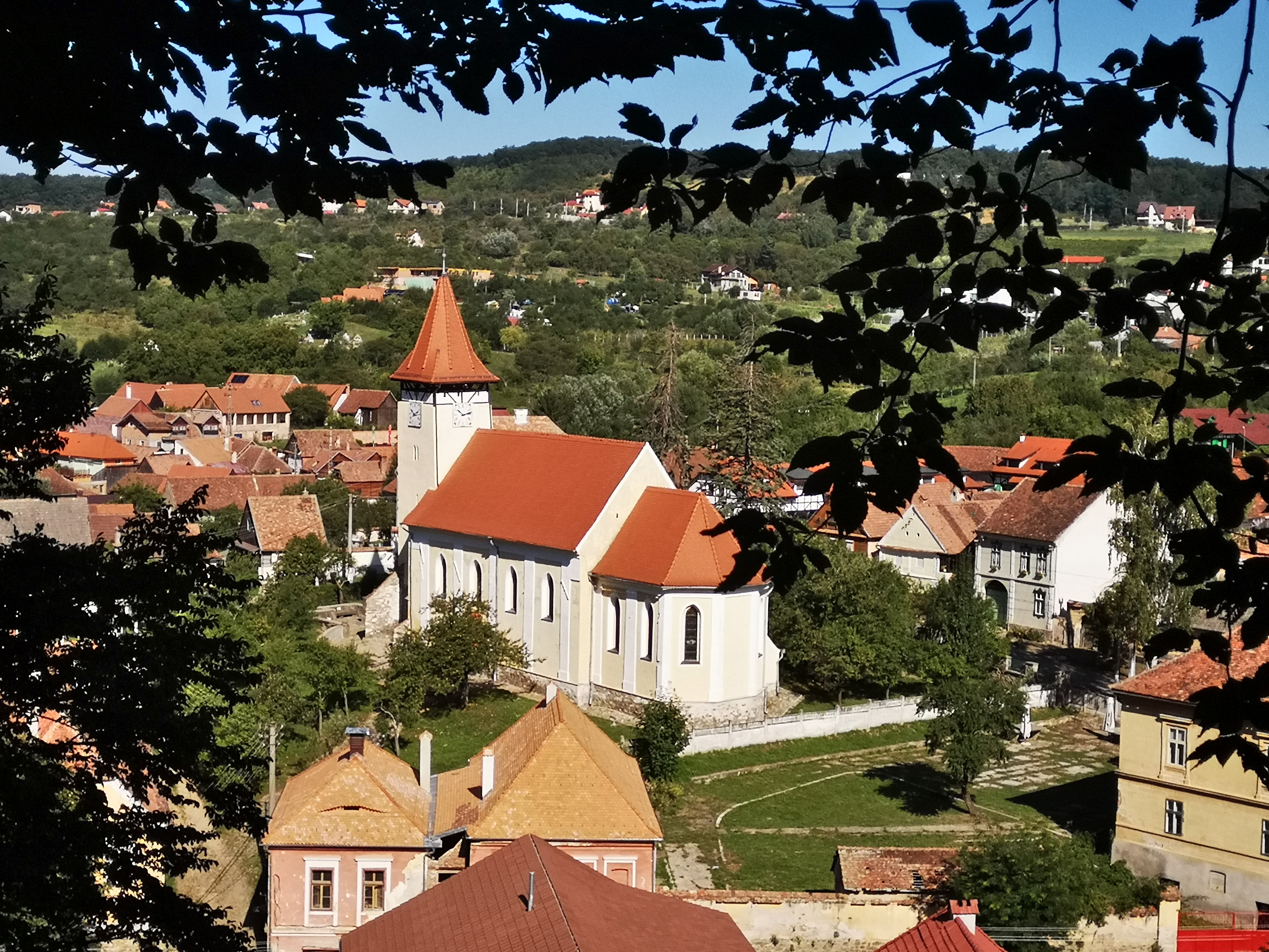
The medieval Evangelical Lutheran church of the local Transylvanian Saxon community in Cisnădioara

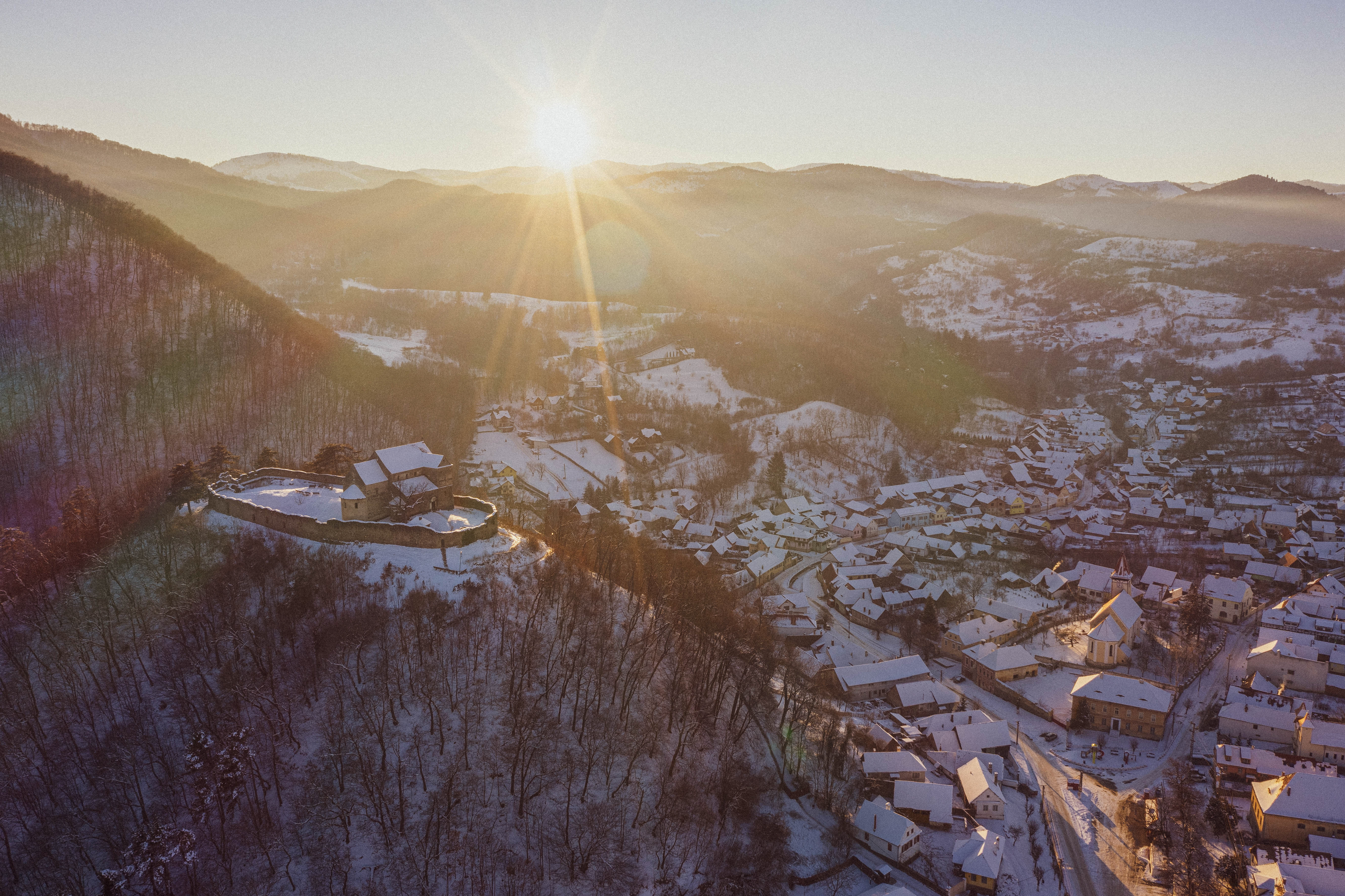
Panoramic view of Cisnădioara

== Bibliography ==
- Augustin Ioan, Hanna Derer. The Fortified Churches of the Transylvanian Saxons. Noi Media Print, 2004
