= Ingvar Asp =

Swedish weightlifter

Personal information
- Nationality: Swedish
- Born: 2 October 1938 (age 86); Lund, Sweden

Sport
- Sport: Weightlifting

Ingvar Asp (born 2 October 1938) is a Swedish weightlifter. He competed in the men's middle heavyweight event at the 1964 Summer Olympics.
