= Sadık Pekünlü =

Turkish weightlifter

Personal information
- Nationality: Turkish
- Born: 21 July 1938; Istanbul, Turkey
- Died: 14 July 1973 (aged 34); Istanbul, Turkey

Sport
- Sport: Weightlifting

Sadık Pekünlü (21 July 1938 – 14 July 1973) was a Turkish weightlifter. He competed in the men's middle heavyweight event at the 1964 Summer Olympics.
