= Gaber Hafez =

Egyptian weightlifter

Personal information
- Nationality: Egyptian
- Born: Cairo, Egypt

Sport
- Sport: Weightlifting

Gaber Hafez is an Egyptian weightlifter. He competed in the men's middle heavyweight event at the 1968 Summer Olympics.
