= Alfred Steiner =

French weightlifter (1943–2024)

Personal information
- Full name: Alfred Justin Steiner
- Nationality: French
- Born: 29 December 1943 Mannheim, Germany
- Died: 6 December 2024 (aged 80) Hoenheim, France

Sport
- Sport: Weightlifting

Alfred Steiner (29 December 1943 – 6 December 2024) was a French weightlifter. He competed in the men's middle heavyweight event at the 1968 Summer Olympics. Steiner died on 6 December 2024, at the age of 80.
