= Efrain Gusquiza =

Peruvian weightlifter

Personal information
- Born: 13 March 1945 (age 80); Lima, Peru

Sport
- Sport: Weightlifting

Efrain Gusquiza (born 13 March 1945) is a Peruvian weightlifter. He competed in the men's middle heavyweight event at the 1968 Summer Olympics.
