= Oscar Nobua =

Argentine weightlifter

Personal information
- Born: 28 January 1949 (age 76); Burzaco, Argentina

Sport
- Sport: Weightlifting

Oscar Nobua (born 28 January 1949) is an Argentine weightlifter. He competed in the men's middle heavyweight event at the 1968 Summer Olympics.
