= Fernando Esquivel =

Costa Rican weightlifter

Personal information
- Born: 17 August 1939 (age 86) San Ramón, Costa Rica

Sport
- Sport: Weightlifting

Fernando Esquivel Durán (born 17 August 1939) is a Costa Rican weightlifter. He competed in the men's middle heavyweight event at the 1968 Summer Olympics.
