= Mahmoud Shakir =

Iraqi weightlifter

Personal information
- Nationality: Iraqi
- Born: 6 February 1935
- Died: 25 December 2020 (aged 85)

Sport
- Sport: Weightlifting

Mahmoud Shakir (6 February 1935 – 25 December 2020) was an Iraqi weightlifter. He competed in the men's middle heavyweight event at the 1964 Summer Olympics.

He won "dozens" of national championships and continued competing until the age of 45. He was considered one of his country's top weightlifters and later one of its best coaches. He was also a popular bodybuilder, and was nicknamed "Shakir Al-Abyad" to distinguish him from Shakir Salman ("Shakir Al-Asmar"), who was his rival at the national bodybuilding championships in the 1950s and 1960s. At his death in 2020, the historian Hajj Aqil Atara noted: "Shaker Mahmoud is famous as a champion of Iraq in the sport of bodybuilding and weightlifting. He later took responsibility for coaching weightlifters in Iraq."
