= Bakr Bassam =

Egyptian weightlifter

Personal information
- Nationality: Egyptian
- Born: 22 December 1939 (age 85); Cairo, Egypt

Sport
- Sport: Weightlifting

Bakr Bassam (born 22 December 1939) is an Egyptian weightlifter. He competed in the men's middle heavyweight event at the 1968 Summer Olympics.
