= Graeme Hall (weightlifter) =

Australian weightlifter

Personal information
- Nationality: Australian
- Born: 9 February 1942
- Died: 4 February 2015 (aged 72)

Sport
- Sport: Weightlifting

Graeme Lansell Hall (9 February 1942 – 4 February 2015) was an Australian weightlifter. He competed in the men's middle heavyweight event at the 1964 Summer Olympics.
