= Vladimir Golovanov =

Russian weightlifter (1938–2003)

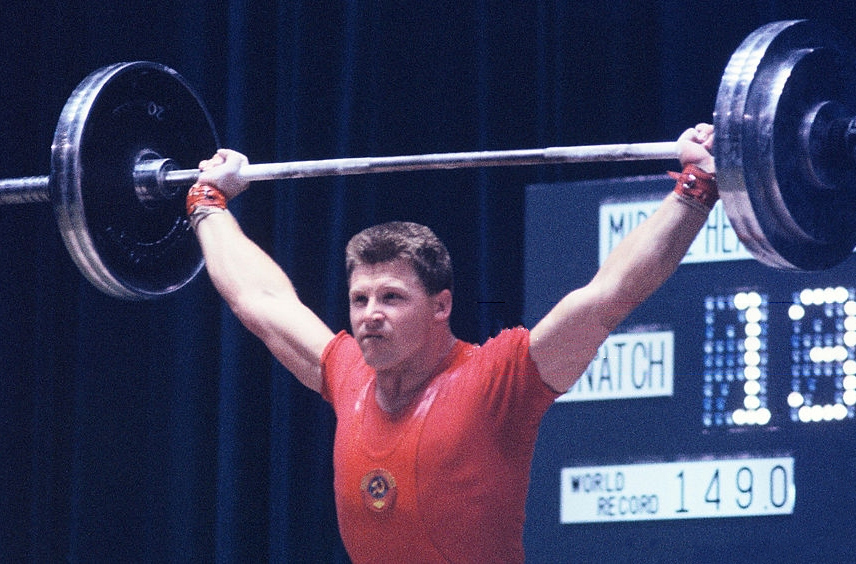
- Vladimir Golovanov at the 1964 Olympics

Personal information
- Born: 29 November 1938 Batamay, Russian SFSR, Soviet Union
- Died: 2 August 2003 (aged 64) Khabarovsk, Russia
- Height: 1.72 m (5 ft 8 in)
- Weight: 90 kg (198 lb)

Sport
- Sport: Weightlifting
Medal record
Representing the Soviet Union
Olympic Games
Gold medal – first place	1964 Tokyo	-90 kg
World Championships
Gold medal – first place	1964 Tokyo	-90 kg
Silver medal – second place	1965 Tehran	-90 kg

Vladimir Semyonovich Golovanov (Russian: Владимир Семёнович Голованов, born 29 November 1938 – 2 August 2003) was a Russian weightlifter who won a gold medal at the 1964 Summer Olympics. Between 1963 and 1968 he set five official world records, all in the press.

Golovanov took weightlifting in 1957 while serving with the Soviet Army in the Russian Far East. He had his best achievements in 1964–1965, when he won two medals at the Olympics and world championships and set three world records. In 1965 he was injured and recovered only by 1968, when he won a Soviet heavyweight title and set his last world record. He retired in 1972, after finished third at the national championships, and later coached weightlifters in Khabarovsk. In 1985 he became president of the Russian Far East weightlifting federation, and from 1998 until his death headed a sport school in Khabarovsk.
