= Gáspár Heltai =

Hungarian printer and historian (c.1490 - c.1574)

- Born: Caspar Helth c. 1510; Nagydisznód, Kingdom of Hungary (now Cisnădie, Romania)
- Died: c. 1574; Kolozsvár, Principality of Transylvania (now Cluj-Napoca, Romania)
- Occupations: Writer, printer

Philosophical work
- Era: Reformation
- School: Lutheran; Unitarianism

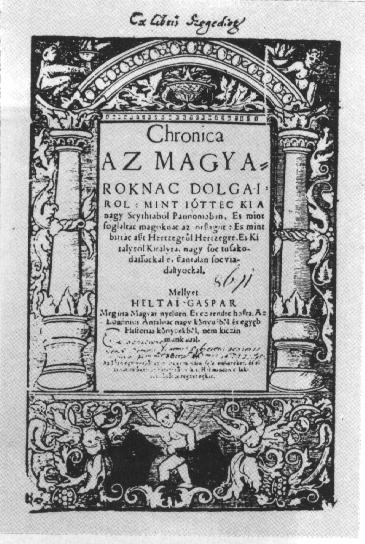
Book cover of Chronica az magyaroknak dolgairól

Gáspár Heltai (c. 1510–1574) was a Protestant writer and printer from Transylvania who produced many books in Hungarian. He was also the father of the sister-in-law of Ferenc Dávid.

== Career ==
Heltai was born Caspar Helth to a Transylvanian Saxon and Lutheran family. His surname may derive from the German name of his birthplace, Heltau (now Cisnădie, Romania). In 1543, he studied at Wittenberg University (now Martin Luther University Halle-Wittenberg) under Philip Melanchthon. Returning to Transylvania the next year, he became a clergyman in the Calvinist and then Lutheran denominations. In 1569, he converted to Unitarianism and defended it in a debate with representatives of the Reformed (i.e. Calvinist) Church in Gyulafehérvár (now Alba Iulia, Romania).

From 1550 he worked as a printer in partnership with György Hoffgreff in Kolozsvár (now Cluj-Napoca, Romania). The press functioned under Heltai's name after 1552, and continued to work after his death thanks to his widow.

Heltai founded a public bath, a paper mill and the first brewery in the town. He is considered the first religious reformer in Kolozsvár, and a great spirit of Hungarian Unitarian Reformation. Together with a group of scholars Heltai produced an almost complete translation of the New Testament into Hungarian. His work marked the first buds of a secular literature in Hungary.

=== Bonfini translation ===
Heltai's most voluminous work is his reworking and translation of Antonio Bonfini's Rerum Hungaricum Decades ("Ten Volumes of Hungarian Matters"), which Heltai published in 1575 as Chronica az magyaroknak dolgairól ("Chronicle of the Hungarians’ Past Deeds"). The work was printed in Kolozsvár.

== Relevant literature ==
- Forgács-Drahota, Erzsébet (2000) Sprichwörter in den Werken von Gáspár Heltai. Acta Ethnographica Hungarica, 45 (3–4). pp. 337–357. ISSN 1216-9803
