= Stergios Tsoukas =

Greek weightlifter (born 1936)

Personal information
- Born: 1936 (age 88–89); Kastoria, Greece

Sport
- Sport: Weightlifting

Stergios Tsoukas (born 1936) is a Greek weightlifter. He competed in the men's middle heavyweight event at the 1968 Summer Olympics.
