= Lazăr Baroga =

Romanian weightlifter

Personal information
- Nationality: Romanian
- Born: 11 August 1937; Cisnădie, Romania
- Died: 14 September 2000 (aged 63); Bucharest, Romania

Sport
- Sport: Weightlifting

Lazăr Baroga (11 August 1937 – 14 September 2000) was a Romanian weightlifter. He competed at the 1960 Summer Olympics and the 1964 Summer Olympics.

Baroga created " the Baroga table, it is a document that helps to calculate the ratio on the semi-technical movements in weightlifting
