= Cheng Sheng-teh =

Taiwanese weightlifter (born 1941)

Personal information
- Nationality: Taiwanese
- Born: 24 August 1941 (age 83)

Sport
- Sport: Weightlifting

Cheng Sheng-teh (born 24 August 1941) is a Taiwanese weightlifter. He competed at the 1964 Summer Olympics and the 1968 Summer Olympics.
