= Árpád Nemessányi =

Hungarian weightlifter (born 1944)

Personal information
- Nationality: Hungarian
- Born: 15 May 1944 (age 80); Budapest, Hungary

Sport
- Sport: Weightlifting

Árpád Nemessányi (born 15 May 1944) is a Hungarian weightlifter. He competed at the 1964 Summer Olympics and the 1968 Summer Olympics.
