= Cycling at the 1958 British Empire and Commonwealth Games – Men's sprint =

Cycling Track – Men's sprint at the 1958 British Empire and Commonwealth Games
- Venue: Maindy Stadium
- Dates: July 1958
- Competitors: 22

Medalists
| gold medal | Dick Ploog | Australia |
| silver medal | Karl Barton | England |
| bronze medal | Lloyd Binch | England |

The men's sprint at the 1958 British Empire and Commonwealth Games, was part of the cycling programme, which took place in July 1958.

== Final standings ==
| Rank | Rider |
|---|---|
| 1st place, gold medalist(s) | Dick Ploog (AUS) |
| 2nd place, silver medalist(s) | Karl Barton (ENG) |
| 3rd place, bronze medalist(s) | Lloyd Binch (ENG) |
| 4 | Warren Johnston (NZL) |
| 5 | Barry Coster (AUS) |
| 5 | Ian Browne (AUS) |
| 5 | Keith Harrison (ENG) |
| 5 | Alfred Swift (SAF) |

== Results ==
Heats

| Heat | Winner | 2nd | 3rd | Time (last 200) |
|---|---|---|---|---|
| 1 | (Australia) Ian Browne | (Pakistan) Muhammad Shah Rukh | n/a | 12.6 |
| 2 | (England) Lloyd Binch | (Trinidad and Tobago) U. F. Lewis | n/a | 12.0 |
| 3 | (Australia) Dick Ploog | (Southern Rhodesia) K. G. Kendall | (Northern Ireland) Leo Feeney | 14.2 |
| 4 | (England) Karl Barton | (Trinidad and Tobago) Hylton Mitchell | n/a | 12.0 |
| 5 | (Canada) Fred Markus | (Wales) Don Skene | n/a | 13.2 |
| 6 | (South Africa) Alfred Swift | (Wales) Wilf Bodman | (Jersey) Don E. Ecobichon | 12.5 |
| 7 | (England) Keith Harrison | (Scotland) Hector McKenzie | (Isle of Man) Ron Killey | 12.4 |
| 8 | (New Zealand) Warren Johnston | (Northern Ireland) Jim Darragh | (Trinidad and Tobago) Clyde Rimple | 12.4 |
| 9 | (Australia) Barry Coster | (Northern Ireland) Martin McKay | (Wales) Clive Rees | 12.0 |

Repechage

| Athlete | Athlete | Score |
|---|---|---|
| Feeney | Lewis | 1–0 |
| McKay | Ecobichon | 1–0 |
| Mitchell | Killey | 1–0 |
| McKenzie | Rimple | 1–0 |
| Darragh | Rees | 1–0 |

Second Round

| Athlete | Athlete | Score |
|---|---|---|
| Ploog | Mitchell | 2–0 |
| Barton | McKenzie | 2–0 |
| Binch | McKay | 2–0 |
| Johnston | Skene | 2–0 |
| Swift | Darragh | 2–0 |
| Browne | Feeney | 2–0 |
| Coster | Markus | 2–0 |
| Harrison | Kendall | 2–0 |

Quarter-final

| Athlete | Athlete | Score |
|---|---|---|
| Ploog | Swift | 2–0 |
| Barton | Browne | 2–1 |
| Binch | Coster | 2–0 |
| Johnston | Harrison | 2–0 |

Semi finals

| Athlete | Athlete | Score |
|---|---|---|
| Ploog | Binch | 2–0 |
| Barton | Johnston | 2–0 |

Third place

- Binch bt Johnston

Final

- Ploog bt Barton
