= Wales at the 1958 British Empire and Commonwealth Games =

- CGF code: WAL
- CGA: Commonwealth Games Council for Wales
- Website: teamwales.net

in Cardiff, Wales
- Competitors: 114 in 9 sports
- Flag bearers: Opening: Closing:
- Medals Ranked 11thth: Gold 1 Silver 3 Bronze 7 Total 11

British Empire and Commonwealth Games appearances
- 1930; 1934; 1938; 1950; 1954; 1958; 1962; 1966; 1970; 1974; 1978; 1982; 1986; 1990; 1994; 1998; 2002; 2006; 2010; 2014; 2018; 2022; 2026; 2030

Wales competed at the 1958 British Empire and Commonwealth Games in Cardiff, Wales, from 18 July to 26 July 1958.

Wales finished 11th in the medal table with one gold medal, three silver and seven bronze medals, six medals of which came in the boxing.

Boxer Brian Nancurvis chose to represent England and not Wales.

== Medalists ==
Medal	Name	Sport	Event	Date
Gold	Howard Winstone	Boxing	Bantamweight	
Silver	Malcolm Collins	Boxing	Featherweight	
Silver	Ossie Higgins	Boxing	Light heavyweight	
Silver	John Merriman	Athletics	6 Mile run	19 July
Bronze	Donald Braithwaite	Boxing	Flyweight	
Bronze	Roger Pleace	Boxing	Heavyweight	
Bronze	Bill Brown	Boxing	Light middleweight	
Bronze	Don Skene	Cycling	10 Miles Scratch	22 July
Bronze	John Preston; Malcolm Kerslake; John Evans	Fencing	Team foil	22 July
Bronze	John Preston; Malcolm Kerslake; Roger Maunder; Ted Lucas	Fencing	Team sabre	24 July
Bronze	David Edwards; John Fage; David Prichard; John Edwards	Rowing	Coxless fours	22 July

== Athletics ==
The athletics tournament was held at the Cardiff Arms Park. The results for the Welsh athletes are as below:

=== Men ===
Track

Athlete	Event	Round 1		Round 2		Semifinal		Final	
Athlete	Event	Result	Rank	Result	Rank	Result	Rank	Result	Rank
Dewi Roberts	100 yds	10.1	3	did not advance					
Ron Jones	100 yds	9.9	1 Q	10.0	4	did not advance			
Nick Whitehead	100 yds	10.0	3 Q	10.0	3	did not advance			
John Morgan	100 yds	10.0	1 Q	10.0	4	did not advance			
John Jones	220 yds	21.9	2 Q	22.1	3	did not advance			
Nick Whitehead	220 yds	22.9	3 Q	22.0	3	did not advance			
John Oliver	220 yds	22.8	5	did not advance					
Tom Billington	880 yds	1:57.3	5	—N/a				Did not advance	
Haydn Tawton	880 yds	1.58.0	6	—N/a				Did not advance	
Norman Horrell	880 yds	22.8	5	—N/a				Did not advance	
John Williams	880 yds	1:56.3	5	—N/a				Did not advance	
Tony Pumfrey	Mile run	4:12.3	5	—N/a				Did not advance	
John Merriman	3 Mile run	—N/a						13:32.4	6
David Richards	3 Mile run	—N/a							13
John Merriman	6 Mile run	—N/a						28:48.8	2nd place, silver medalist(s)
Rhys Davies	Marathon	—N/a						2:30:54	9
Ron Franklin	Marathon	—N/a						2:31.24	10
Dyfrig Rees	Marathon	—N/a						2:39:17	15
Tom Wood	Marathon	—N/a						2:53.42	18
Bob Shaw	440 yard hurdles	—N/a		55.0	4 Q	54.2	4	did not advance	
Ron Jones; Nick Whitehead; Dewi Roberts; John Morgan	4 x 110yd relay	42.5	3 Q	—N/a				42.0	5

Field events

Athlete	Event	Qualification		Final	
Athlete	Event	Distance	Position	Distance	Position
Kevin Phillips	High jump	6 ft 1 in (1.85 m)	21	Did not advance	
Terry Morgan	High jump	6 ft 0 in (1.83 m)	25	Did not advance	
John Neill	Pole vault	11 ft 6 in (3.51 m)	13	Did not advance	
Colin Fletcher	Pole vault	12 ft 0 in (3.66 m)	11	Did not advance	
Brian Woolley	Long jump	23 ft 1.5 in (7.049 m)	15 Q	21 ft. 3ins.	16
Ray Gazard	Long jump	21 ft 8.5 in (6.617 m)	23	Did not advance	
Richard Dodd	Triple Jump	45 ft 0.75 in (13.7351 m)	19	Did not advance	
Hywel Williams	Discus throw	152 ft 3.5 in (46.419 m)	7	did not advance	
Malcolm Pemberton	Discus throw	136 ft 10 in (41.71 m)	13	did not advance	
Brian Sexton	Javelin throw	206 ft 1.5 in (62.827 m)	12	did not advance	
Norman Watkins	Javelin throw	196 ft 10 in (59.99 m)	14	did not advance	
Hywel Williams	Shot put	43 ft 11 in (13.39 m)	12	did not advance	
John Davies	Shot put	42 ft 7.75 in (12.9985 m)	14	did not advance	
Laurie Hall	Hammer throw	159 ft 10.5 in (48.730 m)	10	Did not advance	

=== Women ===
Track

Athlete	Event	Round 1		Round 2		Semifinal		Final	
Athlete	Event	Result	Rank	Result	Rank	Result	Rank	Result	Rank
Bronwen Jones	100 yds	11.4	4	—N/a		did not advance			
Jean Whitehead	100 yds	11.4	4	—N/a		did not advance			
Gwyneth Lewis	100 yds	11.4	4	—N/a		did not advance			
Beryl Turner	100 yds	11.9	5	—N/a		did not advance			
Daphne Howard-Williams	220 yds	27.5	4	—N/a		did not advance			
Gwyneth Lewis	220 yds	26.5	3	—N/a		did not advance			
Jean Whitehead	220 yds	25.2	3	—N/a		did not advance			
Jacqueline Barnett	220 yds	27.0	4	—N/a		did not advance			
Sheila Lewis	80 metres hurdles	11.8	3	—N/a				did not advance	
Carol Thomas	80 metres hurdles	11.6	3	—N/a				did not advance	
Bronwen Jones; Jean Whitehead; Gwyneth Lewis; Ellen Grainger	4 x 110 yard relay	DSQ		—N/a				did not advance	

Field events

Athlete	Event	Qualification		Final	
Athlete	Event	Distance	Position	Distance	Position
Bronwen Jones	Long jump	17 ft 8.75 in (5.4039 m)	9	Did not advance	
Sally Jones	Long jump	15 ft 5 in (4.70 m)	14	Did not advance	

== Boxing ==
The boxing events were held at Sophia Gardens Pavilion. The results for the Welsh athletes are as below:

Athlete	Event	Round of 16	Quarterfinals	Semifinals	Final	
Athlete	Event	Opposition Result	Opposition Result	Opposition Result	Opposition Result	Rank
Donald Braithwaite	Flyweight	Bye	Rhodesia W. A. Pretorius; W on points	Jackie Brown (SCO); L on points	Did Not Advance	3rd place, bronze medalist(s)
Howard Winstone	Bantamweight	Bye	Peter Bennyworth (ENG); W on points	Richard Hanna (NIR); W stoppage	Oliver Taylor (AUS); W on points	1st place, gold medalist(s)
Malcolm Collins	Featherweight	Bye	Maurice Purton (NZL); W on points	Gert Coetzee (SAF); W on points	Wally Taylor (AUS); L on points	2nd place, silver medalist(s)
Bernard Robson	Lightweight	Bye	James Jordon (NIR); L on points	did not advance		
Billy Phillips	Welterweight	—N/a	Joseph Greyling (SAF); L on points	did not advance		
Bill Brown	Light middleweight	?	?	Stuart Pearson (ENG); L	Did not advance	3rd place, bronze medalist(s)
Glyn Waters	Middleweight	Hari Singh (IND); L KO	did not advance			
Ossie Higgins	Light heavyweight	—N/a	F. E. Nonelly (CAN); W stoppage	Willie Bannon (SCO); W on points	Tony Madigan (AUS); L on points	2nd place, silver medalist(s)
Roger Pleace	Heavyweight	—N/a	Angus Thomson (SCO); W on points	David Thomas (ENG); L DQ	did not advance	3rd place, bronze medalist(s)

== Cycling ==
The cycling tournament was held at the Maindy Stadium. The results for the Welsh athletes are as below:

=== Track ===
Athlete	Event	Round 1	Repechage	Eighth Finals	Quarterfinals	Semifinals	Final	
Athlete	Event	Opposition Time	Opposition Time	Opposition Time	Opposition Time	Opposition Time	Opposition Time	Rank
Don Skene	Sprint	Fred Markus (CAN); L	Muhammad Shah Rukh (PAK); W	Warren Johnston (NZL); L	Did not advance			
Wilf Bodman	Sprint	Alfred Swift (SAF); L Don Ecobichon (JER); W	K. G. Kendall (RHO); L	Did not advance				
Clive Rees	Sprint	Barry Coster (AUS); L Martin McKay (NIR); L	Jim Darragh (NIR); L	Did not advance				
Ray Richards	Pursuit	—N/a		Did not advance				
Gwyn Humphries	Pursuit	—N/a		Did not advance				
Dave Evans	Pursuit	—N/a			Warwick Dalton (NZL); L	Did not advance		
Don Skene	Time trial	Did not advance						
Clive Rees	Time trial	Did not advance						
Wilf Bodman	Time trial	Did not advance						
Don Skene	Scratch	—N/a						3rd place, bronze medalist(s)
Gwyn Humphries	Scratch	—N/a						?
Dave Evans	Scratch	—N/a						?

=== Road ===
Athlete	Event	Time	Rank
Norman Hooper	road race		?
Chris Hughes	road race		?
Ron Roach	road race	5 32:25.7	17th
Danny Morgan	road race	5 19:26.7	8th

== Diving ==
The diving tournament was held at the Wales Empire Pool. The results for the Welsh athletes are as below:

Men

Athlete	Event	Preliminaries		Final	
Athlete	Event	Points	Rank	Points	Rank
Syd Lingard	10m Platform	33.50	8th	71.76	7th
Alan Roberts	3m Springboard	37.48	9th	76.62	9th

== Fencing ==
The fencing tournament was held at Cae'r Castell School. The results for the Welsh athletes are as below:

Men - Team

Athlete	Event	1st Round		Finals			Rank
Athlete	Event	Opposition Score	Opposition Score	Opposition Score	Opposition Score	Opposition Score	Rank
John Preston; Malcolm Kerslake; John Evans	Team foil	Scotland; W 6–3	Hong Kong; W 7–2	England; L 2–7	Australia; L 1–8	New Zealand; W 5–2	3rd place, bronze medalist(s)
Roger Maunder; Malcolm Kerslake; John L. Williams	Team épée	New Zealand; L 2–7	England; L 0–5	did not advance			
Roger Maunder; Malcolm Kerslake; Ted Lucas; John Preston	Team sabre	New Zealand; W 6–3	Hong Kong; W 5–4	England; L 1–8	Australia; L 4–5	Canada; W 6–3	3rd place, bronze medalist(s)

Men - Individual

Athlete	Event	1st Round	Semi-finals	Finals	Rank
Athlete	Event	Wins Placing	Wins Placing	Wins Placing	Rank
John Preston	Individual foil	1 - 4th	3 - 3rd	1 - 7th	
John McCombe	Individual foil	2 - 5th	did not advance		
John Evans	Individual foil	2 - 6th	did not advance		
Roger Maunder	Individual épée	5 - 1st	2 - 4th	1 - 7th	
John Evans	Individual épée	4 - 2nd	2 - 5th	Did not advance	
John L. Williams	Individual épée	2 - 4th	did not advance		
Ted Lucas	Individual sabre	1 - 6th	did not advance		
Roger Maunder	Individual sabre	3 - 3rd	2 - 5th	Did not advance	
Malcolm Kerslake	Individual sabre	2 - 4th	1 - 5th	Did not advance	

Women - Individual

Athlete	Event	1st Round	Finals	Rank
Athlete	Event	Wins Placing	Wins Placing	Rank
Meg Waters	Individual foil	1 - 6th	Did not advance	
Jennifer King	Individual foil	2 - 5th	Did not advance	

== Lawn Bowls ==
The lawn bowls tournament was held at the Cardiff Bowls Club. The results for the Welsh athletes are as below:

Athlete	Event	Played	Won	Lost	Points	Rank
Bernie Williams	Singles	11	4	7	8	9th
Wilf John; Jack Lewis	Pairs	11	4	7	8	9th
Evan Jones; Danny Prosser; Jack Griffths; Len Hill	Fours	11	6	5	8	7th

== Rowing ==
The rowing events were held at the Lake Padarn in Llanberis. The results for the Welsh athletes are as below:

Athlete	Event	Time	Rank
David Edwards; John Fage; David Prichard; John Edwards	Coxless Fours	6:47.9	3rd place, bronze medalist(s)
David Edwards; John Edwards	Coxless Pair	dnf	4th

== Swimming ==
The swimming tournament was held at the Wales Empire Pool. The results for the Welsh athletes are as below:

Men

Athlete	Events	Heat	Final	Rank
Athlete	Events	Time	Time	Rank
Glyn Morgan	110 yds freestyle	1:03.8	Did not advance	
Bernard Newman	110 yds freestyle	1:02.8	Did not advance	
Brian Flook	440 yds freestyle	5:10.3	Did not advance	
Mike Edwards	440 yds freestyle	5:05.1	Did not advance	
Mike Edwards	1650 yds freestyle	20:55.5	Did not advance	
Chris Hansard	1650 yds freestyle	20:37.6	Did not advance	
John Brockway	110 yds backstroke	1:09.2 Q	1:08.4	6th
Alban Stevens	110 yds backstroke	1:11.5	Did not advance	
Colin Booth	110 yds backstroke	1:14.3	Did not advance	
John Beavan	220 yds breaststroke	2:50.7 Q	2:50.9	5th
Hugh Jenkins	220 yds breaststroke	2:52.6 Q	2:55.3	6th
John Hewitt	220 yds breaststroke	2:52.6	Did not advance	
Norman O'Brien	220 yds butterfly	3:06.2	Did not advance	
Richard Evans	220 yds butterfly	2:58.8	Did not advance	
Mike Edwards; Brian Flook; Glyn Morgan; David Glasenbury	220 yds freestyle relay	—N/a	9:46.4	5th
John Brockway; John Beavan; Bernard Newman; Richard Evans	110 yds medley relay	4:54.9 Q	4:52.9	6th

Women

Athlete	Events	Heat	Final	Rank
Athlete	Events	Time	Time	Rank
Jocelyn Hooper	110 yds freestyle	1:10.5	Did not advance	
Jocelyn Hooper	440 yds freestyle	5:52.3	Did not advance	
Jacqueline Townsend	110 yds freestyle	1:13.8	Did not advance	
Gillian Howells	220 yds breaststroke	3:05.2	Did not advance	
Cynthia Shaddick	220 yds breaststroke	3:06.8	Did not advance	
Janet Le Mare	220 yds breaststroke	3:08.1	Did not advance	
Joyce Dixon	110 yds backstroke	1:21.0	Did not advance	
Diana Davies	110 yds backstroke	1:24.3	Did not advance	
Geraldine Francis	110 yds butterfly	1:21.1	Did not advance	
Geraldine Francis; Jocelyn Hooper; Gillian Howells; Jacqueline Townsend	110 yds freestyle relay	—N/a	5:02.4	6th
Geraldine Francis; Jocelyn Hooper; Gillian Howells; Joyce Dixon; Diana Davies	110 yds medley relay	5:29.0 Q	5:24.3	6th

== Weightlifting ==
The weightlifting tournament was held at the Cae'r Castell School. The results for the Welsh athletes are as below:

Athlete	Event	Press	Snatch	Clean & jerk	Total	Rank
Myrddin John	Bantamweight	175	170	220	565	7th
John Heywood	Featherweight	190	180	230	600	8th
Ron Jenkins	Lightweight	200	215	275	690	8th
Yorrie Evans	Middleweight	210	210	280	700	9th
Gordon Newman	Middleweight	200	220	280	700	10th
Alwyn Evans	Mid heavyweight	260	250	300	810	5th
Melville Barnett	Mid heavyweight	260	235	310	805	6th

== Wrestling ==
The wrestling events were held at Sophia Gardens Pavilion. The results for the Welsh athletes are as below:

Athlete	Event	First round	Second round	Third round	Fourth round	Fifth round	Rank
Athlete	Event	Opposition Result	Opposition Result	Opposition Result	Opposition Result	Opposition Result	Rank
Sid Griffiths	Flyweight	Peter Christie (ENG); L by a fall	Ian Epton (SAF); L retired	Did not advance			
Reg Yates	Lightweight	Herbie Hall (ENG); L by a fall	Anthony Ries (SAF); L by a fall	Did not advance			
Tony Scott	Welterweight	C. N. Bambacus (AUS); L by a fall	Gordon Hobson (NZL); L by points	Did not advance			
Geoffrey Bailey	Middleweight	Ray Myland (ENG); L by a fall	George Farquhar (SCO); L by a fall	Did not advance			
John Dodd	Light Heavyweight	R. M. Fowler (AUS); L by a fall	Bob Steckle (CAN); L by a fall	Did not advance			
Eric Harvey	Heavyweight	Lila Ram (IND); L by a fall	Jacobus Hanekom (SAF); L by a fall	Did not advance			

== Bibliography ==
- Newham, C. E., ed. (1958). The Official History of the VIth British Empire and Commonwealth Games. Cardiff: Organising Committee of the VIth British Empire and Commonwealth Games.
