= Cycling at the 1958 British Empire and Commonwealth Games – Men's 1 km time trial =

Cycling Track – Men's 1km time trial at the 1958 British Empire and Commonwealth Games
- Venue: Maindy Stadium
- Dates: July 1958
- Competitors: 26 from 12 nations

Medalists
gold medal	Neville Tong	England
silver medal	Warren Scarfe	Australia
bronze medal	Warwick Dalton	New Zealand

The men's 1 km time trial at the 1958 British Empire and Commonwealth Games, was part of the cycling programme, which took place in July 1958.

== Results ==
Rank	Rider	Time
1st place, gold medalist(s)	Neville Tong (ENG)	1:12.1
2nd place, silver medalist(s)	Warren Scarfe (AUS)	1:12.4
3rd place, bronze medalist(s)	Warwick Dalton (NZL)	1:12.6
4	Ian Browne (AUS)	1:12.8
5	Alfred Swift (SAF)	1:13.5
6	Keith Harrison (ENG)	1:14.4
7	Jan Hettema (SAF)	1:14:9
8	Fred Markus (CAN)	1:15.0
9	Leo Feeney (NIR)	1:15.1
10	Hector McKenzie (SCO)	1:15:4
11	John Entwistle (ENG)	1:15.9
12	Ron Killey (IOM)	1:16.6
13	Jim Darragh (NIR)	1:16.8
14	Don Skene (WAL)	1:18.0
15	Martin McKay (NIR)	1;18.2
16	Clyde Rimple (TTO)	1:18.4
17	Clive Rees (WAL)	1:18.4
18	Paul Enock (CAN)	1:18.6
19	Wilf Bodman (WAL)	1:18.6
20	Stan Perchard (JER)	1:21.0
21	Hylton Mitchell (TTO)	1:21.4
22	Alfie Fairweather (SCO)	1:21.9
23	Don Ecobichon (JER)	1:23.8
24	Muhammad Shah Rukh (PAK)	1:23.8
25	B. Porter (KEN)	1:23.9
26	U.F. Lewis (TTO)	1:23.9
