= Cycling at the 1956 Summer Olympics – Men's sprint =

Men's sprint at the Games of the XVI Olympiad
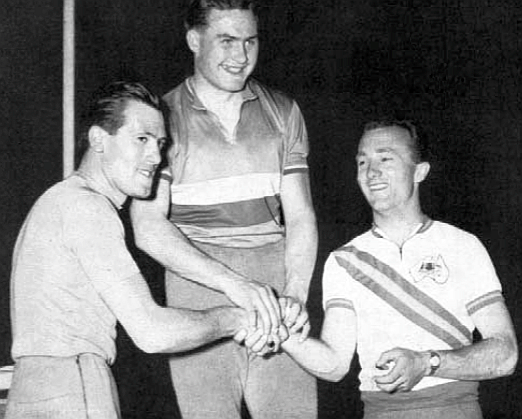
- The medalists: Pesenti, Rousseau, Ploog
- Venue: Melbourne
- Dates: 3–6 December 1956
- Competitors: 18 from 18 nations

Medalists
1st place, gold medalist(s)		Michel Rousseau; France
2nd place, silver medalist(s)		Guglielmo Pesenti; Italy
3rd place, bronze medalist(s)		Dick Ploog; Australia

The men's sprint or "scratch race" at the 1956 Summer Olympics in Melbourne, Australia, was held from 3 to 6 December 1956. There were 18 participants representing 18 nations in competition, with one additional non-starter. Each nation was limited to one cyclist. The event was won by Michel Rousseau of France, the nation's first victory in the men's sprint since 1928 and fifth overall. Guglielmo Pesenti of Italy earned silver and Dick Ploog of Australia finished third for bronze.

== Background ==
This was the 11th appearance of the event, which has been held at every Summer Olympics except 1904 and 1912. None of the semifinalists from 1952 returned. The favorite was Michel Rousseau of France, the reigning world champion. His main competitor (the runner-up at the last two world championships), Jorge Batiz of Argentina, did not compete in Melbourne.

Brazil, Colombia, and Vietnam each made their debut in the men's sprint. France made its 11th appearance, the only nation to have competed at every appearance of the event.

== Competition format ==
This track cycling event consisted of numerous rounds: four main rounds and a two-round repechage. Each race involved the riders starting simultaneously and next to each other, from a standing start. Because the early part of races tend to be slow-paced and highly tactical, only the time for the last 200 metres of the one-kilometre race is typically recorded.

The trend in the Olympic sprint competition was toward expansion of a best-of-three match format (beginning in 1932 for the final, expanding in 1936 and 1948 to more rounds). The 1952 edition had bucked that trend by returning to an entirely single-race format for the first time since 1928; the 1956 event returned to it, reversing many of the format changes made four years earlier.

The first round consisted of six heats of three cyclists each (one was scheduled to have four, but a withdrawal left it with only three). The winner of each heat advanced to the quarterfinals. The Official Report says that the eight fastest losers went to the repechage, but this is a very odd advancement rule for the sprint competition in which time is generally not relevant. Cycling Magazine provides results of repechage heats more consistent with all losers going to the repechage, which would be a much more common rule in a sprint event. In either case, there were four repechage semifinals; the winner of each moved on to the repechage finals while all others were eliminated. The repechage finals were two heats of two cyclists, with the winners rejoining the round 1 victors in the quarterfinals while the losers were eliminated.

The quarterfinals began the best-of-three rounds. The eight quarterfinalists were paired into four matches; the winner of a match was the first cyclist to win two races. The four winners moved on to the semifinals while the losers were eliminated. The semifinals again were best-of-three, with the winners moving on to the final and the losers going to a bronze medal match. Both of the medal matches were best-of-three as well.

== Records ==
The records for the sprint are 200 metre flying time trial records, kept for the qualifying round in later Games as well as for the finish of races.

World record	Rostislav Vargachkin (USSR)	11.4	Tula, Soviet Union	25 July 1955
Olympic record	Werner Potzernheim (GER)	11.6	Helsinki, Finland	29 July 1952

Dick Ploog broke the Olympic record and matched the world record in the first race of the competition, finishing the last 200 metres in 11.4 seconds. This time was not beaten, but was matched multiple times: Michel Rousseau in the second race of quarterfinal 1, Warren Johnston in the first race of quarterfinal 4, Rousseau again in the first race of semifinal 1, Ploog in the second race of the bronze medal match, and Rousseau in both in both races of the final.

== Schedule ==
All times are Australian Eastern Standard Time (UTC+10)

Date	Time	Round
Monday, 3 December 1956	14:30	Round 1 Repechage semifinals Repechage finals
Tuesday, 4 December 1956	20:00	Quarterfinals; Semifinals
Thursday, 6 December 1956	20:00	Finals

== Results ==
=== Round 1 ===
==== Round 1 heat 1 ====
León Mejía is listed as third place in this heat in the Official Report (with Lê fourth), but the Official Report also has a photograph of heat 3 which shows Mejía in that heat. Cycling Magazine reported the results as below. Mejía was likely moved to heat 3 after Günther Ziegler's withdrawal.

Rank	Cyclist	Nation	Time 200 m	Notes
1	Dick Ploog	Australia	11.4	Q, =WR, OR
2	Evrard Godefroid	Belgium		R
3	Lê Văn Phước	Vietnam		R

==== Round 1 heat 2 ====
Rank	Cyclist	Nation	Time 200 m	Notes
1	Michel Rousseau	France	11.6	Q
2	Hylton Mitchell	Trinidad and Tobago		R
3	Shazada Muhammad Shah-Rukh	Pakistan		R

==== Round 1 heat 3 ====
Ziegler is listed as third place in this heat in the Official Report, but the Official Report also has a photograph of the heat which shows León Mejía. Cycling Magazine reported the results as below. Mejía was likely moved to heat 3 after Ziegler's withdrawal.

Rank	Cyclist	Nation	Time 200 m	Notes
1	Jack Disney	United States	13.0	Q
2	Keith Harrison	Great Britain		R
3	León Mejía	Colombia		R
—	Günther Ziegler	Germany	DNS	

==== Round 1 heat 4 ====
Rank	Cyclist	Nation	Time 200 m	Notes
1	Guglielmo Pesenti	Italy	11.8	Q
2	Hernán Masanés	Chile		R
3	Fred Markus	Canada		R

==== Round 1 heat 5 ====
Nyman is listed as third place in the heat in the Official Report, but Cycling Magazine indicates he did not start.

Rank	Cyclist	Nation	Time 200 m	Notes
1	Ladislav Fouček	Czechoslovakia	12.4	Q
2	Warren Johnston	New Zealand		R
3	Paul Nyman	Finland		R

==== Round 1 heat 6 ====
Rank	Cyclist	Nation	Time 200 m	Notes
1	Boris Romanov	Soviet Union	12.4	Q
2	Thomas Shardelow	South Africa		R
3	Anésio Argenton	Brazil		R

=== Repechage semifinals ===
==== Repechage semifinal 1 ====
The Official report lists only Godefroid and Shah-Rukh, but Cycling Magazine recorded Lê as third place in the first heat of the repechage.

Rank	Cyclist	Nation	Time 200 m	Notes
1	Evrard Godefroid	Belgium	Unknown	Q
2	Shazada Muhammad Shah-Rukh	Pakistan		
3	Lê Văn Phước	Vietnam		

==== Repechage semifinal 2 ====
The Official Report shows only Shardelow and Mejía, but Cycling Magazine indicates that all losers of the first round went to the repechage. It also identifies the cyclists in the other three heats, leaving Nyman. If Nyman did compete in the first round (which is unclear), he would have been assigned to this repechage heat; he did not start in it, however.

Rank	Cyclist	Nation	Time 200 m	Notes
1	Thomas Shardelow	South Africa	12.8	Q
2	León Mejía	Colombia		
—	Paul Nyman	Finland		

==== Repechage semifinal 3 ====
The Official Report lists only Argenton and Mitchell, but Cycling Magazine places Markus third in this heat.

Rank	Cyclist	Nation	Time 200 m	Notes
1	Anésio Argenton	Brazil	13.0	Q
2	Hylton Mitchell	Trinidad and Tobago		
3	Fred Markus	Canada		

==== Repechage semifinal 4 ====
The Official Report lists only Johnston and Masanés, but Cycling Magazine places Harrison third in this heat.

Rank	Cyclist	Nation	Time 200 m	Notes
1	Warren Johnston	New Zealand	12.4	Q
2	Hernán Masanés	Chile		
3	Keith Harrison	Great Britain		

=== Repechage finals ===
==== Repechage final 1 ====
Johnston won by a length.

Rank	Cyclist	Nation	Time 200 m	Notes
1	Warren Johnston	New Zealand	12.0	Q
2	Evrard Godefroid	Belgium		

==== Repechage final 2 ====
Shardelow won by inches.

Rank	Cyclist	Nation	Time 200 m	Notes
1	Thomas Shardelow	South Africa	12.6	Q
2	Anésio Argenton	Brazil		

=== Quarterfinals ===
==== Quarterfinal 1 ====
Rank	Cyclist	Nation	Race 1	Race 2	Race 3	Notes
1	Michel Rousseau	France	12.6	11.4 =WR	—N/a	Q
2	Thomas Shardelow	South Africa			—N/a	

==== Quarterfinal 2 ====
Ploog had a puncture on the first race, which was restarted.

Rank	Cyclist	Nation	Race 1	Race 2	Race 3	Notes
1	Dick Ploog	Australia	12.4	11.6	—N/a	Q
2	Jack Disney	United States			—N/a	

==== Quarterfinal 3 ====
Rank	Cyclist	Nation	Race 1	Race 2	Race 3	Notes
1	Guglielmo Pesenti	Italy	11.8	12.8	—N/a	Q
2	Ladislav Fouček	Czechoslovakia			—N/a	

==== Quarterfinal 4 ====
Rank	Cyclist	Nation	Race 1	Race 2	Race 3	Notes
1	Warren Johnston	New Zealand	11.4 =WR		12.0	Q
2	Boris Romanov	Soviet Union		12.0		

=== Semifinals ===
==== Semifinal 1 ====
Rank	Cyclist	Nation	Race 1	Race 2	Race 3	Notes
1	Michel Rousseau	France	11.4 =WR	12.2	—N/a	Q
2	Warren Johnston	New Zealand			—N/a	B

==== Semifinal 2 ====
Ploog had a puncture on the second race, which was restarted. In the third race, Ploog stopped, thinking he had been fouled; his protest was denied.

Rank	Cyclist	Nation	Race 1	Race 2	Race 3	Notes
1	Guglielmo Pesenti	Italy	11.6		12.2	Q
2	Dick Ploog	Australia		12.2		B

=== Final ===
==== Bronze medal match ====
Rank	Cyclist	Nation	Race 1	Race 2	Race 3
3rd place, bronze medalist(s)	Dick Ploog	Australia	11.6	11.4 =WR	—N/a
4	Warren Johnston	New Zealand			—N/a

==== Final ====
Rank	Cyclist	Nation	Race 1	Race 2	Race 3
1st place, gold medalist(s)	Michel Rousseau	France	11.4 =WR	11.4 =WR	—N/a
2nd place, silver medalist(s)	Guglielmo Pesenti	Italy			—N/a

== Final classification ==
Rank	Cyclist	Nation
1st place, gold medalist(s)	Michel Rousseau	France
2nd place, silver medalist(s)	Guglielmo Pesenti	Italy
3rd place, bronze medalist(s)	Dick Ploog	Australia
4	Warren Johnston	New Zealand
5	Jack Disney	United States
5	Ladislav Fouček	Czechoslovakia
5	Boris Romanov	Soviet Union
5	Thomas Shardelow	South Africa
9	Anésio Argenton	Brazil
9	Evrard Godefroid	Belgium
11	Hernán Masanés	Chile
11	León Mejía	Colombia
11	Hylton Mitchell	Trinidad and Tobago
11	Shazada Muhammad Shah-Rukh	Pakistan
15	Keith Harrison	Great Britain
15	Lê Văn Phước	Vietnam
15	Fred Markus	Canada
15	Paul Nyman	Finland
—	Günther Ziegler	Germany
