= Jennifer King =

Jennifer King may refer to:

- Jennifer King (American football), American football coach
- Jennifer King (fencer), Welsh fencer
- Jennifer King Rice, née King, American education policy expert and academic administrator

== See also ==
- Jenny King, New Zealand librarian
