= Ron Franklin (athlete) =

Welsh athlete (c. 1928–c.2019)

Personal information
- Nationality: British (Welsh)
- Born: c. 1928
- Died: c. 2019 Lincolnshire, England

Sport
- Sport: Athletics
- Event: Long-distance / cross-country
- Club: Newport Harriers; Tipton Harriers

Ronald G. Franklin (c. 1928 – c. 2019) was a track and field athlete from Wales, who competed at the 1958 British Empire and Commonwealth Games (now Commonwealth Games).

== Biography ==
Franklin was a member of the Newport Harriers and in March 1957, he finished behiond Norman Horrell during the 1957 Welsh cross-country championships.

He finished behind Rhys Davies in the marathon at the 1958 AAA Welsh championships.

Franklin, at the age of 30, represented the 1958 Welsh team at the 1958 British Empire and Commonwealth Games in Cardiff, Wales, where he participated in one event; the marathon race.

In 1963 Franklin was running for Tipton Harriers and was the Welsh maarthon champion.

On 26 September 2019, it was announced that Franklin had died from complications of dementia at a care home in Lincolnshire.
