= Tom Wood (athlete) =

Welsh athlete

Personal information
- Nationality: British (Welsh)
- Born: Wales

Sport
- Sport: Athletics
- Event: Long-distance / cross-country
- Club: Newport Harriers

Thomas C. Wood is a former track and field athlete from Wales, who competed at the 1958 British Empire and Commonwealth Games (now Commonwealth Games).

== Biography ==
Wood was a member and later captain of the Newport Harriers and in March 1957, he finished behind Norman Horrell during the 1957 Welsh cross-country championships.

He finished third behind Rhys Davies in the marathon at the 1958 AAA Welsh championships.

Wood represented the 1958 Welsh team at the 1958 British Empire and Commonwealth Games in Cardiff, Wales, where he participated in one event; the marathon race.

At the time of the Games, Wood had represented Wales in the cross-country seven times at international level.
