= Cycling at the 1958 British Empire and Commonwealth Games – Men's scratch =

Cycling Road – Men's scratch at the 1958 British Empire and Commonwealth Games
- Venue: Maindy Stadium, Cardiff
- Dates: July 1958
- Competitors: 34 from 14 nations

Medalists
| gold medal | Ian Browne | Australia |
| silver medal | Warren Johnston | New Zealand |
| bronze medal | Don Skene | Wales |

The Men's scratch race at the 1958 British Empire and Commonwealth Games, was part of the cycling programme, which took place in July 1958.

Ian Browne won the event setting a games record of 21:40.2.

== 10 mile scratch race ==
| Pos | Athlete | Time |
|---|---|---|
| 1 | (Australia) Ian Browne | 21:40.2 mins |
| 2 | (New Zealand) Warren Johnston | |
| 3 | (Wales) Don Skene | |
| 4 | (South Africa) Alfred Swift | |
| 5 | (Australia) Barry Allen Coster | |
| 6 | (New Zealand) Warwick Dalton | |
| | (Australia) Frank Brazier | |
| | (Canada) Patrick Murphy | |
| | (Canada) Fred Markus | |
| | (Canada) Paul Enock | |
| | (England) Johnny Ralph | |
| | (England) Keith Harrison | |
| | (England) John Geddes | |
| | (Isle of Man) Ron Killey | |
| | (Isle of Man) Vic G. Holland | |
| | (Isle of Man) F. G. Brew | |
| | (Jersey) Stan Perchard | |
| | (Jersey) Don E. Ecobichon | |
| | (Kenya) B. Porter | |
| | (Northern Ireland) Jim Darragh | |
| | (Northern Ireland) Tommy Talbot | |
| | (Northern Ireland) Leo Feeney | |
| | (Pakistan) Muhammad Shah Rukh | |
| | (Scotland) Ernie Scally | |
| | (Scotland) Donald Langlands | |
| | (Scotland) Hector McKenzie | |
| | (South Africa) Abe Jonker | |
| | (South Africa) Jan Hettema | |
| | (Trinidad and Tobago) U. F. Lewis | |
| | (Trinidad and Tobago) Hylton Mitchell | |
| | (Wales) Gwyn Humphries | |
| | (Wales) Dave Evans | |
| | (Northern Rhodesia) K. G. Kendall | |
