= Janet Le Mare =

British swimmer

Personal information
- Nationality: British (Welsh)
- Born: Q2. 1942 Cardiff, Wales

Sport
- Sport: Swimming
- Event: Breaststroke
- Club: Cardiff Ladies SC; Newport SC

Janet Le Mare also spelt Lemare (born 1942) is a former Welsh swimmer who specialised in breaststroke and competed at the Commonwealth Games.

== Biography ==
Le Mare was born in Cardiff, Wales and attended Kitchener Road School in Cardiff. Despite having progressive myopia she competed in the prestigious mass start event known as the Taff Swim held in Roath Park Lake. Le Mare living in Leckwith Road, Cardiff at the time was guided by a friends verbal instructions from a rowing boat.

Le Mare joined the Cardiff Ladies' Swimming Club and won the 1956 Glamorgan County Championships 100 yards breaststroke title.

She represented the Welsh team at the 1958 British Empire and Commonwealth Games in Cardiff, Wales, where she competed in the 220 yards breaststroke event.

In 1960 she became Welsh breaststroke champion and set two national records at the European trials. In 1962, she was swimming for Newport Swimming Club and was selected for the initial team to represent Wales again, at the 1962 British Empire and Commonwealth Games in Perth, Australia but lost out on a place to breaststroke rival Cynthia Shaddick.

In 1964 she married Gordon Summers in Cardiff.
