= John Henning =

John Henning may refer to:

- John Henning (1771–1851), Scottish sculptor
- John Henning (journalist) (1937–2010), American reporter and political analyst
- John F. Henning (1915–2009), American labor leader and ambassador
- John Henning (long distance runner) (1910–1999), Northern Irish marathon runner
