= Verebes =

Verebes is a surname. Notable people with the surname include:

- Ernő Verebes (1902–1971), Hungarian-American actor
- Eugene Verebes, English fencer
- József Verebes (1941–2016), Hungarian footballer
