= Athletics at the 1957 World University Games – Men's 800 metres =

The men's 800 metres event at the 1957 World University Games was held at the Stadium Charlety in Paris on 5 and 7 September 1957.

== Medalists ==
Gold	Silver	Bronze
Olaf Lawrenz; West Germany	Josef Cegledi; Austria	Edward Buswell; Great Britain

== Results ==
=== Heats ===
Rank	Heat	Athlete	Nationality	Time	Notes
1	1	Josef Cegledi	Austria	1:53.8	Q
2	1	Leslie Locke	Great Britain	1:54.2	Q
3	1	Lang Stanley	United States	1:54.5	Q
4	1	Henryk Gralewski	Poland	1:54.5	
5	1	Johannes Kaiser	West Germany	1:55.9	
6	1	Jean Bordelot	France	1:57.5	
7	1	Félix Arribas	Spain	?:??.?	
8	1	Ali-Tolpa	Finland	?:??.?	
9	1	Roberto Sambo	Italy	?:??.?	
1	2	Olaf Lawrenz	West Germany	1:54.3	Q
2	2	Edward Buswell	Great Britain	1:54.4	Q
3	2	Francis Rivière	France	1:54.8	Q
4	2	Roger Bofferding	Luxembourg	1:57.5	
5	2	Jaime Rodrigo	Spain	2:00.8	
6	2	Andrej Vipotnik	Yugoslavia	2:02.3	
7	2	Garo Kazandijan	Lebanon	?:??.?	
1	3	Jim Paterson	Great Britain	1:55.3	Q
2	3	Rudolf Klaban	Austria	1:55.9	Q
3	3	Ralph Seidel	West Germany	1:56.3	Q
4	3	André Wendling	France	1:57.1	
5	3	Manuel García Cabrera	Spain	1:59.0	
6	3	Michel Lallemand	Belgium	2:02.6	

=== Final ===
Rank	Name	Nationality	Time	Notes
1st place, gold medalist(s)	Olaf Lawrenz	West Germany	1:50.3	
2nd place, silver medalist(s)	Josef Cegledi	Austria	1:50.6	
3rd place, bronze medalist(s)	Edward Buswell	Great Britain	1:51.6	
4	Lang Stanley	United States	1:52.1	
5	Leslie Locke	Great Britain	1:52.7	
6	Ralph Seidel	West Germany	1:52.8	
7	Rudolf Klaban	Austria	1:56.5	
8	Jim Paterson	Great Britain	1:56.6	
	Francis Rivière	France	?	
