= John Edwards (rower) =

British rower

Personal information
- Nationality: British
- Born: 28 March 1935 Kensington, London, England
- Died: 13 March 1983 (aged 47) Pewsey, Swindon, England
- Education: Christ Church, Oxford

Sport
- Sport: Rowing
- Club: Leander Club
Medal record
Representing Wales
Commonwealth Games
Bronze medal – third place	Cardiff 1958	coxless four
Silver medal – second place	Perth 1962	coxless four

John Hugh Michael Edwards (28 March 1935 – 13 March 1983) was a rower who won medals at two Commonwealth Games.

== Biography ==
Edwards was born into a rowing family, his father Group Captain Hugh Edwards D.F.C, was an Olympic gold medallist had won three events at the Henley Royal Regatta.

He attended Christ Church, Oxford and was a trialist for the Oxford team at the 1956 Boat Race.

Of East Isley, Berkshire at the time and along with his brother David Edwards and varsity Oxford teammate John Fage, they formed three members of the coxless four selected for the 1958 Welsh team for the 1958 British Empire and Commonwealth Games in Cardiff, Wales.

The fourth member of the team was David Prichard and in the coxless fours event they won the bronze medal.

Four years later, he and his brother David were in the coxless four that won the silver medal at the 1962 British Empire and Commonwealth Games.
