= John Williams (runner) =

Welsh athlete (born c.1941)

Personal information
- Nationality: British (Welsh)
- Born: c.1941 Wales

Sport
- Sport: Athletics
- Event: Middle-distance
- Club: Carmarthen Harriers

John Michael Williams (born c.1941) is a former track and field athlete from Wales, who competed at the 1958 British Empire and Commonwealth Games (now Commonwealth Games).

== Biography ==
Williams was educated at Carmarthen Grammar School and was a member of the Carmarthen Harriers. In 1958, he recorded 1min 57sec over 880 yards and in June 1958 he represented South Wales against North Wales in a warm up event before the Empire Games, finishing runner-up behind Haydn Tawton in the 880 yards event.

He represented the 1958 Welsh team at the 1958 British Empire and Commonwealth Games in Cardiff, Wales, where he participated in one event; the 880 yards race.
