= Meg Waters =

Welsh fencer

Personal information
- Nationality: British (Welsh)
- Born: c.1939 Wales

Sport
- Sport: Fencing
- Event: Foil
- Club: Cory Hall Fencing Club, Cardiff; Salle Reynolds Fencing Club, Cardiff

Meg Waters (born c.1939) was a fencer from Wales, who competed at the 1958 British Empire and Commonwealth Games (now Commonwealth Games).

== Biography ==
Waters was educated at Lady Margaret High School for Girls in Cardiff and studied medicine at St Mary's Hospital, London. She twice won the title at the British Schoolgirls Championships in the early 1950s.

She was a member of the Cory Hall Fencing Club in Cardiff and was described as a fencing prodigy when she represented the Great Britain U21 team at the age of 15.

In 1956, living at Bronwydd Avenue in Penylan, Cardiff, she had joined the Salle Reynolds Club in Cardiff, when she won the British U21 title for a second consecutive years.

Waters represented the 1958 Welsh team at the 1958 British Empire and Commonwealth Games in Cardiff, Wales, where she participated in the individual foil event.
