= Sally Jones (long jumper) =

Welsh athlete

Personal information
- Nationality: British (Welsh)
- Born: c. 1938 Neath, Wales

Sport
- Sport: Athletics
- Event: Long Jump / high jump
- Club: Roath Harriers, Cardiff

Sally Jones (born c. 1938) is a former track and field athlete from Wales, who competed at the 1958 British Empire and Commonwealth Games (now Commonwealth Games).

== Biography ==
Jones was educated at Neath Grammar School and studied at the Cardiff Training College of Domestic Art.

She was the 1957 Welsh high jump and long jump champion and a member of the Roath Harriers in Cardiff.

In June 1958 she represented South Wales against North Wales in a warm up event before the Empire Games, winning the high jump event and finishing third behind Monica Zeraschi and Bronwen Jones in the long jump event. She also won the high jump event at the 1958 AAA Welsh championships.

Jones represented the 1958 Welsh team at the 1958 British Empire and Commonwealth Games in Cardiff, Wales, where she participated in one event; the long jump.

At the time of the Games she lived at Tudor House, Glynneath Road, Resolven.
