= Dyfrig Rees =

Welsh athlete (1923–2025)

Personal information
- Nationality: British (Welsh)
- Born: 13 July 1923 Neath, Wales
- Died: 22 October 2025

Sport
- Sport: Athletics
- Event: Long-distance / cross-country
- Club: Coventry Godiva Harriers

Dyfrig Rees (13 July 1923 – 22 October 2025) was a track and field athlete from Wales, who competed at the 1958 British Empire and Commonwealth Games (now Commonwealth Games).

== Biography ==
Rees was a member of the Coventry Godiva Harriers and in March 1957, he finished behind Norman Horrell during the 1957 Welsh cross-country championships.

In 1957 Rees was a Welsh international.

Rees represented the 1958 Welsh team at the 1958 British Empire and Commonwealth Games in Cardiff, Wales, where he participated in one event; the marathon race.

At the time of the Games, Rees was a factory machinist from Cwmbran but living in Coventry and was listed as a former Welsh marathon champion.

Rees died on 22 October 2025, at the age of 102.
