= Ray Billington =

Welsh athlete (born c.1934)

Personal information
- Nationality: British
- Born: 24 March 1934 Wales
- Died: 14 September 2026 (aged 92)

Sport
- Sport: Athletics
- Event: Middle-distance
- Club: Rhyl and District Athletics Club

Thomas Raymond Billington (24 March 1934 – 14 September 2026) was a track and field athlete from Wales, who competed at the 1958 British Empire and Commonwealth Games (now Commonwealth Games).

== Biography ==
Billington was a member of the Rhyl and District Athletics Club and in 1957 improved on his own 880 yards record, setting a time of 1min 59.4.

In June 1958 he represented North Wales against South Wales in a warm up event before the Empire Games, winning the 440 yards events. He also finished runner-up behind Norman Horrell in the 880 yards event at the 1958 AAA Welsh championships.

He represented the 1958 Welsh team at the 1958 British Empire and Commonwealth Games in Cardiff, Wales, where he participated in one event; the 880 yards race.
