= Colin Fletcher (disambiguation) =

Colin Fletcher may refer to:

- Colin Fletcher (1922-2007), Welsh-born, American backpacker and writer
- Colin Fletcher (bishop) (born 1950), British Anglican bishop
- Colin Fletcher (cricketer), Jamaican cricketer
- Colin Fletcher (fighter), British fighter
- Colin Fletcher (pole vaulter) (born c. 1935), British athlete
