= Raymond Richards =

Raymond Richards may refer to:

- Ray Richards (American football) (1906-1974), American football coach and former player
- Ray Richards (cyclist) (1931-2009), Welsh cyclist
- Ray Richards (soccer) (born 1946), Australian soccer coach and former player
- Raymond Richards (high jumper) (born 2001), Jamaican high jumper
