= Colin Booth (disambiguation) =

Colin Booth may refer to:

- Colin Booth (1934–2025), English footballer
- Colin Booth (mycologist) (1924–2003), English mycologist
- Colin Booth (swimmer) (1939–1975), Welsh swimmer
