= David Prichard =

British rower

Personal information
- Nationality: British (Welsh)
- Born: April 1935 (age 91) Llanelly, Wales

Sport
- Sport: Rowing
Medal record
Representing Wales
Commonwealth Games
Bronze medal – third place	Cardiff 1958	coxless four

David L. Prichard (born 1935) was a rower who won a bronze medal at the Commonwealth Games.

== Biography ==
Prichard, born in Llanelly, Wales, attended Pembroke College, Oxford and rowed for the University of Oxford second crew.

Varsity Oxford teammates John Fage and the Edwards brothers, David and John, formed the crew that was selected for the 1958 Welsh team for the 1958 British Empire and Commonwealth Games in Cardiff, Wales. Subsequently, in the coxless fours event they won the bronze medal.
