= Brian Flook =

British swimmer

Personal information
- Nationality: British (Welsh)
- Born: Q4.1939 Newport, Wales

Sport
- Sport: Swimming
- Event: Freestyle
- Club: Newport SC

Brian F. Flook (born 1939) is a former Welsh swimmer and water polo player who specialised in freestyle and competed at the Commonwealth Games.

== Biography ==
Flook, born in Newport, Wales, was a member of the Newport Swimming Club.

He took up swimming at the age of 15 and became a coach painter before winning the 1957 Welsh one-mile Championship. Flook finished third in the 220 yards freestyle at the Welsh 1958 A.S.A. Championships.

He represented the Welsh team at the 1958 British Empire and Commonwealth Games in Cardiff, Wales, where he competed in the 440 yards freestyle and helped Wales secure a fifth place finish in the final of the men's 220 yards freestyle relay relay, with Glyn Morgan, David Glasenbury and Mike Edwards.

From 1958 to 1962 he was a five time winner of the prestigious Taff Swim held in Roath Park Lake. In October 1958 he won the 400 yards Bologna Trophy after Bob Sreenan and Stan Clarke were both disqualified for touching the end rail which the organisers had forgotten to remove.

He later played water polo and represented Great Britain at an international level into his late thirties.

In 1961 he married fellow international swimmer Geraldine Francis.
