= Boris Romanov =

Boris Romanov may refer to:

- Boris Romanov (cyclist)
- Boris Romanov (actor)
- Grand Duke Boris Vladimirovich of Russia
