= David Edwards (rower) =

British rower

Personal information
- Nationality: British
- Born: 30 October 1937 England
- Died: 7 June 2019 (aged 81) England
- Education: Christ Church, Oxford

Sport
- Sport: Rowing
- Club: Leander Club
Medal record
The Boat Race
Gold medal – first place	The Boat Race 1959	Oxford
Silver medal – second place	The Boat Race 1958	Oxford
Representing Wales
Commonwealth Games
Bronze medal – third place	Cardiff 1958	coxless four
Silver medal – second place	Perth 1962	coxless four

David Cecil Richard Edwards (30 October 1937 – 7 June 2019) was a rower who won medals at two Commonwealth Games.

== Biography ==
Edwards was born into a rowing family, his father Group Captain Hugh Edwards D.F.C, was an Olympic gold medallist had won three events at the Henley Royal Regatta. He attended Downside School and studied at Christ Church, Oxford.

In 1958, Edwards of East Isley, Berkshire, at the time, competed in the 1958 and 1959 Boat Races for Oxford, and was a member of the winners' team in the latter.

Along with his brother John Edwards and varsity Oxford teammate John Fage, they formed three members of the coxless four selected for the 1958 Welsh team for the 1958 British Empire and Commonwealth Games in Cardiff, Wales.

The fourth member of the team was David Prichard and in the coxless fours event they won the bronze medal.

Four years later, he and his brother John were in the coxless four that won the silver medal at the 1962 British Empire and Commonwealth Games.
