= Hector McKenzie (cyclist) =

Scottish cyclist

Personal information
- Nationality: British (Scotland)
- Born: c.1932

Sport
- Sport: Cycling
- Event(s): Track and Road
- Club: Glasgow Douglas CC

Hector McKenzie (born c.1932) is a former racing cyclist from Scotland, who represented Scotland at the British Empire Games (now Commonwealth Games).

== Biography ==
McKenzie, born in 1932, was a member of the Glasgow Douglas Cycling Club He won the 1955 Scottish 1,000 yards championship at Caird Park Velodrome.

He was champion of Scotland over 10,000 yards for four consecutive years from 1955 to 1958.

He represented the 1958 Scottish Team at the 1958 British Empire and Commonwealth Games in Cardiff, Wales, participating in three cycling program events; the time trial, the sprint and the scratch race
