= Donald Langlands =

Scottish cyclist (1935–2025)

Personal information
- Nationality: British (Scotland)
- Born: 1935 Dundee, Scotland
- Died: 29 November 2025 (aged 90) Forfar, Scotland

Sport
- Sport: Cycling
- Event: Track
- Club: Forfarshire RC

Donald McInnes Langlands (1935 – 29 November 2025) was a Scottish racing cyclist, who represented Scotland at the British Empire Games (now Commonwealth Games).

== Biography ==
Donald McInnes Langlands, born in Dundee in 1935, was a member of the Forfarshire Road Club and trained at the Caird Park Velodrome. He won two titles at the 1954 Strathmore and Forfar track championships.

He represented the 1958 Scottish Team at the 1958 British Empire and Commonwealth Games in Cardiff, Wales, participating in one cycling program event; the scratch race.

By profession, he was a gardener on the Fingask estate and later the Lindertis Estate.

In 1960, he married Scottish ladies cycling champion Florence Taylor.

Langlands died in Forfar on 29 November 2025, at the age of 90.
