= Athletics at the 1958 British Empire and Commonwealth Games – Men's 880 yards =

Men's 880 yards at the Commonwealth Games

The men's 880 yards event at the 1958 British Empire and Commonwealth Games was held on 19 and 22 July at the Cardiff Arms Park in Cardiff, Wales.

== Medalists ==
Gold	Silver	Bronze
Herb Elliott; Australia	Brian Hewson; England	Mike Rawson; England

== Results ==
=== Heats ===
Qualification: First 2 in each heat (Q) qualify directly for the final.

Rank	Heat	Name	Nationality	Time	Notes
1	1	Brian Hewson	England	1:52.6	Q
2	1	Donal Smith	New Zealand	1:52.8	Q
3	1	Joe Mullins	Canada	1:53.2	
4	1	Donald McDonald	Scotland	1:54.6	
5	1	Tom Billington	Wales	1:57.3	
5	1	Anthony Seth	British Guiana	1:57.9	
6	1	G. Eastwood	Isle of Man	1:58.0	
7	1	D. A. Agbebiyi	Nigeria	1:58.7	
1	2	Herb Elliott	Australia	1:52.3	Q
2	2	Ted Buswell	England	1:53.0	Q
3	2	Norman Horrell	Wales	1:54.2	
4	2	James Paterson	Scotland	1:54.4	
5	2	Emmanuel Adeleye	Nigeria	1:55.3	
6	2	Frederick Owusu	Ghana	1:55.6	
7	2	Mike Stafford	Jersey	1:56.1	
1	3	Mike Rawson	England	1:54.6	Q
2	3	Terry Sullivan	Southern Rhodesia	1:54.6	Q
3	3	Graham Everett	Scotland	1:55.1	
4	3	Gerald Evans	South Africa	1:55.3	
5	3	Aram Keter	Kenya	1:55.4	
6	3	Haydn Tawton	Wales	1:57.0	
	3	Wilton Jackson	Trinidad and Tobago	DNS	
1	4	Mike Farrell	England	1:54.6	Q
2	4	Lesley Locke	Scotland	1:55.0	Q
3	4	Doug Clement	Canada	1:55.0	
4	4	John Williams	Wales	1:56.3	
5	4	Colin Shillington	Northern Ireland	1:56.9	
6	4	Brian Kitchener	Gibraltar	1:57.6	
7	4	J. Boama	Ghana	1:58.4	

=== Final ===
Rank	Name	Nationality	Time	Notes
1st place, gold medalist(s)	Herb Elliott	Australia	1:49.32	GR
2nd place, silver medalist(s)	Brian Hewson	England	1:49.47	
3rd place, bronze medalist(s)	Mike Rawson	England	1:50.94	
4	Terry Sullivan	Southern Rhodesia	1:51.3	
5	Donal Smith	New Zealand	1:51.5	
6	Mike Farrell	England	1:52.1	
7	Lesley Locke	Scotland	1:54.7	
	Ted Buswell	England	DNS	
