= Diana Davies (swimmer) =

British swimmer (born 1940)

Personal information
- Nationality: British (Welsh)
- Born: 28 September 1940 Rhondda Valley, Wales

Sport
- Sport: Swimming
- Event: Backstroke
- Club: Nottingham SC / Maindee SC

Diana Davies (born 28 September 1940) is a former Welsh swimmer who specialised in the backstroke and competed at the Commonwealth Games.

== Biography ==
Davies was born in the Rhondda Valley, Wales and was a comptometer operator at Weldon and Wilkinson in Nottingham. She first represented Wales in 1955. In August 1956, aged 15 and living at Glendon Drive in Sherwood, Nottingham, she became the backstroke champion of Wales.

Swimming for the Nottingham Swimming Club, she subsequently finished sixth in the British Championships in Blackpool before retaining her national title in 1957. She also swam for the Maindee Swimming Club.

She represented the Welsh team at the 1958 British Empire and Commonwealth Games in Cardiff, Wales, where she competed in the 110 backstroke event and helped Wales secure a sixth place finish in the final of the women's 110 yards medley relay, with Geraldine Francis, Jocelyn Hooper, Gillian Howells and Joyce Dixon.
