= Evrard Godefroid =

Belgian cyclist

Personal information
- Born: 29 June 1932 Binche, Belgium
- Died: 31 December 2013 (aged 81)

Cycling career
- Sport: Cycling

Evrard Godefroid (29 June 1932 – 31 December 2013) was a Belgian cyclist. He competed in the time trial and sprint events at the 1956 Summer Olympics.
