= Harry Fenion =

Scottish athlete

Personal information
- Nationality: British (Scottish)
- Born: c.1931

Sport
- Sport: Athletics
- Event(s): Long-distance, marathon, Cross country
- Club: Bellahouston Harriers

Harry Irvine Fenion (born c.1931) is a former track and field athlete from Scotland who competed at the 1958 British Empire and Commonwealth Games (now Commonwealth Games).

== Biography ==
Fenion, a cabinet maker by profession, was a member of the Bellahouston Harriers. He won the 1954 Midland District 6 miles cross country championship and in 1956 he won the 16-miles Clydebank to Helensburgh road race.

In 1957 claimed the Scottish cross country championship and was the 1957 Scottish marathon champion. In February 1958 he was named by the Scottish AAA in the 'possibles list' for the forthcoming Commonwealth and Empire Games and at the 1958 Scottish A.A.A. Championships, he finished runner-up to Hugo Fox.

He represented the Scottish Empire and Commonwealth Games team at the 1958 British Empire Games in Cardiff, Wales, participating in one event, the marathon race.
