= Gillian Howells =

British swimmer (born 1944)

Personal information
- Nationality: British (Welsh)
- Born: 27 June 1944 Pontypool, Wales

Sport
- Sport: Swimming
- Event: Breaststroke / freestyle
- Club: Newport SC

Gillian Howells (born 27 June 1944) is a former Welsh swimmer who specialised in breaststroke and competed at the Commonwealth Games.

== Biography ==
Howells was born Pontypool, Wales, and attended St. Julians High School. She swam for the Newport Swimming Club.

In 1957, she won the 100 yards freestyle Oliver Cup and in September 1957, aged 13, set a Welsh breaststroke record at the Welsh Championships, clocking 1 min 32 sec. She broke the record again a day before her 14th birthday in June 1958.

She represented the Welsh team at the 1958 British Empire and Commonwealth Games in Cardiff, Wales, where she competed in the 220 yards breaststroke event and helped Wales secure two sixth-place finishes in the finals of the women's 110 yards freestyle relay, with Geraldine Francis, Jocelyn Hooper and Jacqueline Townsend and the women's 110 yards medley relay, with Geraldine Francis, Jocelyn Hooper, Diana Davies and Joyce Dixon.
