= Bob Thompson (fencer) =

Northern Irish fencer

Personal information
- Nationality: British (Northern Irish)
- Born: c.1910 Ulster, Northern Ireland

Sport
- Sport: Fencing
- Event(s): Sabre, Foil
- Club: Belfast Fencing Club

Robert A. C. Thompson (1910 – date of death unknown) was a fencer from Northern Ireland, who represented Northern Ireland at the British Empire and Commonwealth Games (now Commonwealth Games).

== Biography ==
Thompson was a member of the Belfast Fencing Club and in 1958 was serving in Cyprus with the Royal Marines.

He represented the 1958 Northern Irish Team at the 1958 British Empire and Commonwealth Games in Cardiff, Wales, participating in the foil and sabre events. He reached the men's sabre final and finished sixth.

Thompson was given the honour of being the flag standard bearer at the 1958 Games. He had given up his military leave to attend the Games.

He finished runner-up in the Imperial Services championships in 1962 and in October 1962 he received a late call up to go to a second Commonwealth Games, when the Northern Ireland Games Council agreed to sponsor him for the 1962 British Empire and Commonwealth Games in Perth, Australia. He was serving with the Royal Marines in Portsmouth as a 2nd lieutenant at the time. However, he was unable to secure a flight and missed the opprtunity to compete.
