= Jacqueline Townsend =

British swimmer (born 1939)

Personal information
- Nationality: British (Welsh)
- Born: Q2. 1939 Newport, Wales

Sport
- Sport: Swimming
- Event: Freestyle
- Club: Maindee SC

Jacqueline M. Townsend (born 1939) is a former Welsh swimmer who specialised in freestyle and competed at the Commonwealth Games.

== Biography ==
Townsend was born Newport, Wales, and held the Welsh junior title and Welsh junior record over 100 yards freestyle. A clerk by trade, she swam for the Maindee Swimming Club and was selected for the Welsh international team in 1957.

She represented the Welsh team at the 1958 British Empire and Commonwealth Games in Cardiff, Wales, where she competed in the 110 yards freestyle event and helped Wales secure a sixth-place finish in the final of the women's 110 yards freestyle relay, with Geraldine Francis, Jocelyn Hooper and Gillian Howells.
