= Joyce Dixon =

British swimmer (born 1945)

Personal information
- Nationality: British (Welsh)
- Born: Q1. 1945 Rhyl, Wales

Sport
- Sport: Swimming
- Event: Backstroke
- Club: Wellington ASC; Shiverers SC, Cardiff

Joyce Dixon (born 1945) is a former Welsh swimmer who specialised in the backstroke and competed at the Commonwealth Games.

== Biography ==
Dixon was born in Rhyl, North Wales but moved with her family as a young child to Wellington, Shropshire, where she attended Wrekin Road School and Wellington High School and lived at 82 Roseway.

In September 1957, at the age of 12, Dixon won three swimming events for Wellington Amateur Swimming Club at the Shropshire County Championships. Her father was the club secretary of Wellington ASC and she was a competent swimmer in the freestyle and breaststroke in addition to her primary backstroke event.

In 1958, swimming for Shiverers SC of Cardiff, she won the Welsh backstroke championship, defeating Diana Davies in the final.

She represented the Welsh team at the 1958 British Empire and Commonwealth Games in Cardiff, Wales, where she competed in the 110 backstroke event and helped Wales secure a sixth place finish in the final of the women's 110 yards medley relay, with Geraldine Francis, Jocelyn Hooper, Diana Davies and Gillian Howells.

She retained her Welsh backstroke title in 1959, 1960 and 1961, the latter in a record time of 68.2 sec but missed out on selection for the 1962 British Empire and Commonwealth Games.
