= Chris Hansard =

British swimmer

Personal information
- Nationality: British (Welsh)
- Born: Q4. 1943 West Glamorgan, Wales

Sport
- Sport: Swimming
- Event: Freestyle
- Club: Bishop Gore School SC; Swansea SC

Christopher J. Hansard (born 1943) is a former Welsh swimmer who specialised in freestyle and competed at the Commonwealth Games.

== Biography ==
Hansard was born in West Glamorgan, Wales, and while still a pupil at Bishop Gore Grammar School in Swansea, was the Welsh 110 yards freestyle champion and record holder, in addition to being the junior medley champion. He was a member of the Bishop Gore School Swimming Club.

He represented the Welsh team at the 1958 British Empire and Commonwealth Games in Cardiff, Wales, where he competed in the 1650 yards freestyle event.

In 1958 and 1959 he won the junior ASA title at Blackpool and swam for Swansea Swimming Club.
