= Norman O'Brien =

British swimmer

Personal information
- Nationality: British (Welsh)
- Born: Q1. 1942 Newport, Wales

Sport
- Sport: Swimming
- Event: Butterfly
- Club: Newport SC

Norman O'Brien (born 1942) is a former Welsh swimmer who specialised in butterfly and competed at the Commonwealth Games.

== Biography ==
O'Brien was born in Newport, Wales. In 1958 he was a telegraph messenger, was the Welsh junior butterfy champion and record holder.

He was a member of the Newport Swimming Club and in September 1957 broke the Welsh junior butterfly record after recording a time of 69 sec. In March 1958 at the Empire Games trials, he set another Welsh junior record, when timed at 1 min 14.5 sec for the 110 yards butterfly, in addition to winning the senior 220 yards butterfly event.

He represented the Welsh team at the 1958 British Empire and Commonwealth Games in Cardiff, Wales, where he competed in the 220 yards butterfly event.
