= Allah Ditta (pole vaulter) =

Pakistani pole vaulter (1932–2020)

Personal information
- Nationality: Pakistani
- Born: 15 December 1932 Panjeri, British India
- Died: 20 March 2020 (aged 87) Panjeri, Pakistan
- Height: 179 cm (5 ft 10 in)
- Weight: 79 kg (174 lb)

Sport
- Sport: Athletics
- Event: Pole vault
Medal record
Men's athletics
Representing Pakistan
Asian Games
Bronze medal – third place	1958 Tokyo	Pole vault
Bronze medal – third place	1962 Jakarta	Pole vault

Allah Ditta (15 December 1932 – 20 March 2020) was a Pakistani pole vaulter who competed in the 1956 Summer Olympics and the 1960 Summer Olympics. Allah Ditta is the only multi-medal winning pole vaulter from South Asia in the history of the Asian Games. M.A. Akbar of Srilanka is the only other male South Asian pole vaulter to win an Asian Games medal, doing so at the inaugural 1951 Games.

== Biography ==
Born in Panjeri in 1932, Ditta first competed internationally at the 1956 Summer Olympics in Melbourne, Australia. Representing Pakistan, he finished in 15th place in the qualifying round of the pole vault event with a height of 4.00 metres.

Two years later at the 1958 Asian Games in Tokyo, Japan, Ditta won the bronze medal in the pole vault. All three medalists cleared 4.20 metres which equalled the Asian Games record. Two months later at the 1958 British Empire and Commonwealth Games in Cardiff, Wales, Ditta finished fourth in the pole vault with a vault of 13 ft 4 in (4.06 m).

Ditta won the British AAA Championships title at the 1959 AAA Championships.

At the 1960 Summer Olympics in Rome, Italy, he finished in 26th place in the qualifying round of the pole vault clearing the same height as four year previously.

At the 1962 Asian Games in Jakarta, Indonesia, Ditta won bronze in the pole vault with a height of 4.10 metres. In his final international appearance three months later, Ditta finished in eighth place in the pole vault at the 1962 British Empire and Commonwealth Games in Perth, Western Australia clearing the bar at 13 ft 0 in (3.96 m).

== See also ==
- List of Pakistani records in athletics
- Athletics in Pakistan
- Pakistan at the Olympics
