= Dave Evans (cyclist) =

Welsh cyclist

Personal information
- Nationality: British (Welsh)

Sport
- Sport: Cycling
- Event(s): Track and Road
- Club: Acme Wheelers, Rhondda

Dave S. Evans is a former racing cyclist from Wales, who represented Wales at the British Empire Games (now Commonwealth Games).

== Biography ==
Evans was a member of the Acme Wheelers in Rhondda and won the 1956 South Wales NCU championship over 25 miles.

Evans was a laboratory chemist with the Steel company of Wales by profession and lived in Port Talbot when he won the Welsh 25 miles championship in 1958.

He represented the 1958 Welsh Team at the 1958 British Empire and Commonwealth Games in Cardiff, Wales, participating in two cycling program events; the individual pursuit and the scratch race.
