= Ellen Grainger =

Welsh athlete

Personal information
- Nationality: British (Welsh)
- Born: c. 1943 Wales

Sport
- Sport: Athletics
- Event: Sprints
- Club: Roath Harriers, Cardiff

Ellen Grainger (born c. 1943) is a former track and field athlete from Wales, who competed at the 1958 British Empire and Commonwealth Games (now Commonwealth Games).

== Biography ==
Grainger was educated at Lady Mary Secondary High School and was a member of the Roath Harriers of Cardiff.

She represented the 1958 Welsh team at the 1958 British Empire and Commonwealth Games in Cardiff, Wales, where she participated in one event; the 4 × 110 yards relay with Bronwen Jones, Gwyneth Lewis and Jean Whitehead.

Grainger was aged 15 at the time of the Games and was chosen solely on her ability as a relay runner. She was the Secondary Schools Champion and Welsh junior record holder and helped Roath Harriers break the Welsh relay record in 1958. However, unfortunately for Grainger, the Welsh team were denied a place in the relay final after being disqualified following an illegal baton change.
