= Leo Feeney =

Northern Irish cyclist

Personal information
- Nationality: British (Northern Irish)

Sport
- Sport: Cycling
- Event(s): Track and Road
- Club: Abbey CC, Belfast

Leo T. Feeney is a former racing cyclist from Northern Ireland, who represented Northern Ireland at the British Empire Games (now Commonwealth Games).

== Biography ==
Feeney was a member of the Abbey Cycling Club of Belfast and won the 1955 championship of Ireland over 880 yards.

He represented the 1958 Northern Irish Team at the 1958 British Empire and Commonwealth Games in Cardiff, Wales, participating in three cycling program events; the time trial, the sprint and the scratch race.

Feeney won two titles at the Irish National Cycling Championships and participated at several world championship events.
