= Ted Lucas (fencer) =

Welsh fencer

Personal information
- Nationality: British (Welsh)
- Born: Wales

Sport
- Sport: Fencing
- Event: Sabre
- Club: Cardiff Fencing Club
Medal record
Representing (Wales)
Commonwealth Games
Bronze medal – third place	1958 Cardiff	team foil

Edward R. Lucas is a Welsh former fencer who won a bronze medal at the Commonwealth Games.

== Biography ==
Lucas from Llanishen, was a member of the Cardiff Fencing Club.

He was selected for the 1958 Welsh team for the 1958 British Empire and Commonwealth Games in Cardiff, Wales, where he competed in the sabre events.

He was eliminated in the first round stages of the individual sabre event but won a bronze medal in the team sabre with John Preston, Roger Maunder and Malcolm Kerslake.

In 1960 he was an instructor for the Welsh Fencing Union.
