= John Preston (fencer) =

Welsh fencer (born 1928)

Personal information
- Nationality: British (Welsh)
- Born: 1928

Sport
- Sport: Fencing
- Event: foil / sabre
Medal record
Representing (Wales)
Commonwealth Games
Bronze medal – third place	1958 Cardiff	team foil
Bronze medal – third place	1958 Cardiff	team sabre

John Preston (born 1928) is a Welsh former fencer who won two bronze medals at the Commonwealth Games.

== Biography ==
Preston was selected for the 1958 Welsh team for the 1958 British Empire and Commonwealth Games in Cardiff, Wales, where he competed in the foil and sabre events

He won two bronze medals in the team sabre with Malcolm Kerslake, Roger Maunder and Ted Lucas and the team foil with Malcolm Kerslake and John Evans.

At the time of the Games, both Preston (a sergeant) and his fencing teammate Roger Maunder (a corporal), were serving in the Royal Air Force at the Royal Air Force St Athan base. Coincidentally the base was being used for the athlete's village for the Games.
