= Jennifer King Rice =

American academic administrator

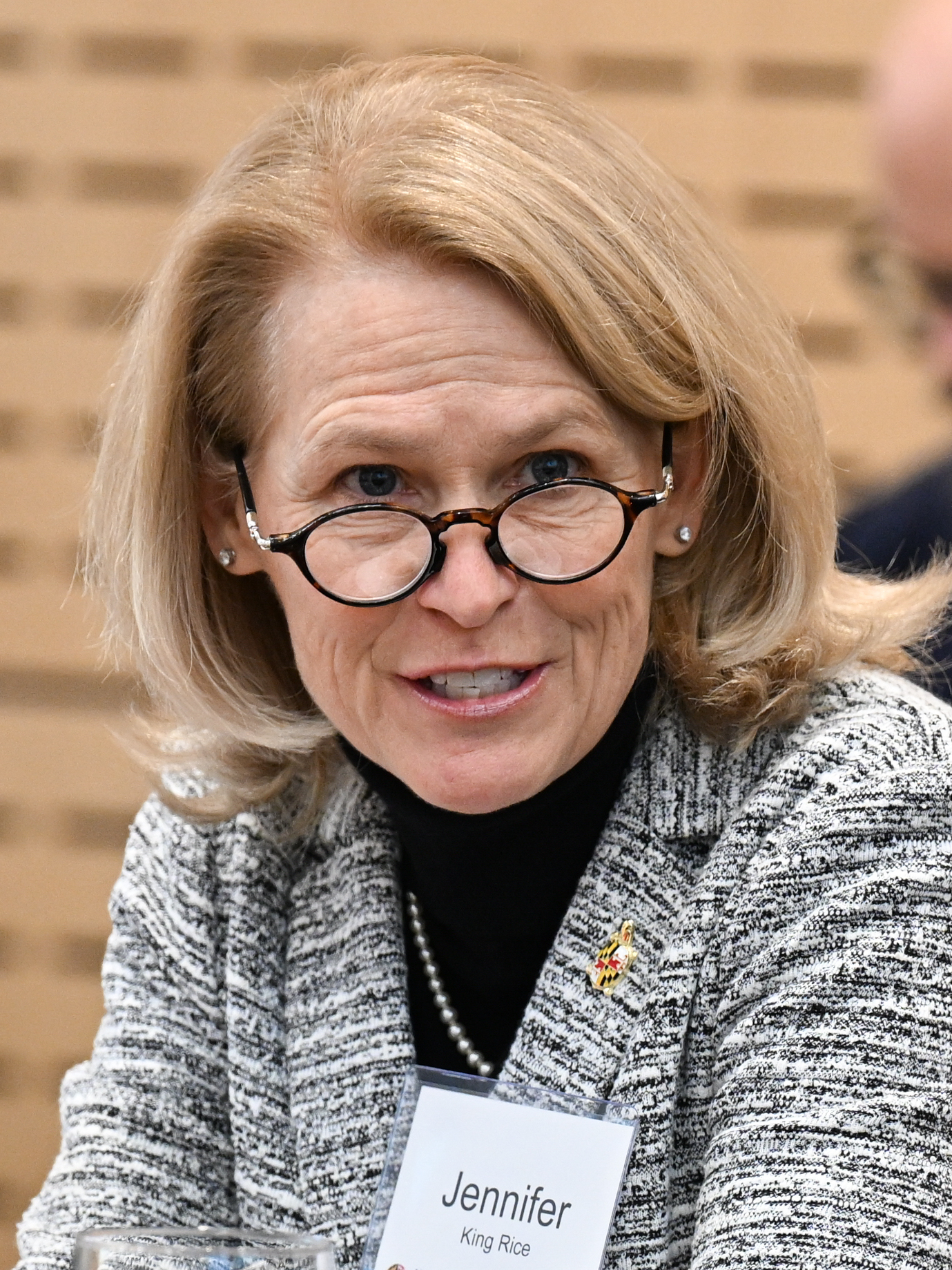
- Rice in 2025
- Born: Jennifer Ann King; February 12, 1968 (age 58); Dayton, Ohio, U.S.

Academic background
- Education: Marquette University (BS); Cornell University (MS, PhD)
- Doctoral advisor: David Monk
- Other advisor: Kenneth A. Strike

Academic work
- Discipline: Education finance and policy
- Institutions: Mathematica Policy Research; Cornell University; University of Maryland, College Park

Jennifer Ann King Rice (born February 12, 1968) is an American education policy expert and academic administrator serving as the provost and senior vice president of the University of Maryland, College Park (UMD) since 2021. She researches education finance, teacher quality, and the economics of educational reform, with a focus on data-driven policy impacts. Rice was previously dean of UMD’s College of Education and director of the Center for Educational Policy and Leadership, where she led studies on teacher incentive programs, high-stakes accountability, and resource allocation in education.

== Early life and education ==
Rice was born on February 12, 1968, in Dayton, Ohio to Victor and Judy King. She lived in State College, Pennsylvania for a few years before moving to Charlotte, North Carolina. She spent the majority of her childhood in Erie, Pennsylvania. She earned a B.S. in mathematics and English from Marquette University in 1990. She completed a M.S. (1993) and Ph.D. (1995) in educational administration and social foundations from Cornell University. Kenneth A. Strike was Rice's academic advisor for her master's degree. Her dissertation was titled, The Effects of Systemic Transitions from Middle to High School Levels of Education on Student Performance in Mathematics and Science: A Longitudinal Education Production Function Analysis. David Monk was her doctoral advisor.

== Career ==
Rice began her career as a researcher at Mathematica Policy Research in 1994. Her work there focused on data-driven analyses related to education policy, setting a foundation for her later work in the economics of education. In 1995, she joined the University of Maryland (UMD), College Park, as an Assistant Professor in the Department of Education Policy and Leadership, where she developed her expertise in education finance and policy analysis.

At the UMD, Rice’s research agenda grew to include the economics of teacher quality and education productivity. In her early years, she contributed significantly to research on teacher distribution, professional development, and the costs associated with educational reforms. Her early articles, including Cost Analysis in Education: Paradox and Possibility (1997), reflect a focus on cost-effectiveness in education, an area she continued to explore throughout her career. This work was complemented by research roles at Cornell University's Finance Center of the Consortium for Policy Research in Education, where she further examined finance structures in educational policy.

In 2000, Rice became Director of the UMD Center for Educational Policy and Leadership, a role she held until 2005. During this time, her research emphasized high-stakes accountability in education and the impact of education reform policies on resource allocation and capacity. Her co-edited volume, High-Stakes Accountability: Implications for Resources and Capacity (2009), published during her tenure, addressed the effects of accountability policies on school funding and capacity. This period also saw her co-author a range of studies exploring fiscal challenges and policy adaptations in urban education. By 2009, Rice was promoted to full Professor, expanding her research into evaluating incentive-based programs aimed at improving teacher performance. Her work frequently focused on the complexities of educator incentive structures, as seen in her formative analysis of the Financial Incentive Rewards for Supervisors and Teachers (FIRST) program in Prince George's County, Maryland. She led multiple projects on this topic, evaluating the effects of these programs on both teacher distribution and student achievement.

In 2013, Rice became the Associate Dean for Graduate Studies and Faculty Affairs within the UMD College of Education, focusing on broader aspects of faculty development and policy impact within the university. Her research during this period included studies on disparities in instructional quality across school districts and the implementation of the Teacher Incentive Fund (TIF) Program. This research sought to track "Race to the Top" investments and assess the efficacy of various educator incentives, such as those in TIF initiatives. Her studies on TIF were published in journals like Educational Policy and Education Finance and Policy, providing insights into the ongoing policy implications and resource needs for successful education reform.

Rice’s research output includes collaborations and work with institutions like the National Education Policy Center and the American Education Research Association (AERA). Recognized for her contributions to the field, she was named a fellow at the National Education Policy Center in 2013. Her career-long research emphasis has remained on understanding the relationship between teacher quality, fiscal policy, and educational productivity, with a particular interest in aligning these insights with data-informed policy recommendations. Rice became dean of the UMD college of education on July 1, 2017, succeeding Donna Wiseman. Rice is a fellow of the AERA and a past president of the Association for Education Finance and Policy. In August 2021, Rice became the senior vice president and provost of UMD.

== Personal life ==
She married Jim Rice in 1994. In 2013, she resided in Annapolis, Maryland.
