= John Evans (fencer) =

Welsh fencer

Personal information
- Nationality: British (Welsh)
- Born: Wales

Sport
- Sport: Fencing
- Event: foil / épée
Medal record
Representing (Wales)
Commonwealth Games
| Bronze medal – third place | 1958 Cardiff | team foil |

John J.Evans is a Welsh former fencer who won a bronze medal at the Commonwealth Games.

== Biography ==
Evans was a member of the Royal Air Force and was stationed at RAF Locking, where in 1956 he was a flying officer. He won the Somerset foil championship in both 1955 and 1956.

He was selected for the 1958 Welsh team for the 1958 British Empire and Commonwealth Games in Cardiff, Wales, where he competed in the foil and épée events.

He won a bronze medal in the team foil with John Preston and Malcolm Kerslake.

Evans went to a second Commonwealth Games, representing the 1962 Welsh team at the 1962 British Empire and Commonwealth Games in Perth, Australia, where he participated in the foil and sabre events.
