= Clive Rees (cyclist) =

Welsh cyclist (born 1939)

Personal information
- Nationality: British (Welsh)
- Born: c. 1939 Pontypool, Wales

Sport
- Sport: Cycling
- Event(s): Track and Road
- Club: Pontypool RC

Clive Rees (born c.1939) is a former racing cyclist from Wales, who represented Wales at the British Empire Games (now Commonwealth Games).

== Biography ==
Rees, born in Pontypool, Wales, was a member of the Pontypool Road Club. In 1958, Rees won the 880 yard open and finished second in the South Wales five miles championship.

He represented the 1958 Welsh Team at the 1958 British Empire and Commonwealth Games in Cardiff, Wales, participating in two cycling program events; the time trial and the sprint.
