= John Neill (pole vaulter) =

Welsh athlete

Personal information
- Nationality: British (Welsh)
- Born: 13 February 1939 Swansea, Wales
- Died: 31 December 2021 Swansea, Wales

Sport
- Sport: Athletics
- Event: Pole vault
- Club: London Polytechnic

John Dewar Neill also called Dewar Neill (13 February 1939 – 31 December 2021) was a track and field athlete from Wales, who competed at the 1958 British Empire and Commonwealth Games (now Commonwealth Games).

== Biography ==
Neill was educated at Chiswick Grammar School and was a member of the London Polytechnic Athletics Club. He defeated Colin Fletcher in the pole vault event at the 1958 AAA Welsh championships and broke the Welsh record in the process.

He represented the 1958 Welsh team at the 1958 British Empire and Commonwealth Games in Cardiff, Wales, where he participated in one event; the pole vault event.

At the time of the Games, he was serving his National Service with the Royal Air Force. In 1959 he lived at 137 Gunnersbury Avenue in Acton and was chosen by the AAA for advanced coaching at Lilleshall.
