= Hugo Fox (athlete) =

Scottish athlete

Personal information
- Nationality: British (Scottish)
- Born: 1921
- Died: 1974 Australia

Sport
- Sport: Athletics
- Event(s): Long-distance, Marathon, cross country
- Club: Shettleston Harriers

Hugo Fox (1921–1974) was a track and field athlete from Scotland who competed at the 1958 British Empire and Commonwealth Games (now Commonwealth Games).

== Biography ==
Fox worked as an iron moulder in a Glasgow foundry and did not start running until 1955. He was a member of the Shettleston Harriers and finished runner-up at the 1957 Scottish marathon championship.

In February 1958 he was named by the Scottish AAA in the 'possibles list' for the forthcoming Commonwealth and Empire Games and at the 1958 Scottish A.A.A. Championships, he defeated both Alex McDougall and Harry Fenion to win the marathon title.

He represented the Scottish Empire and Commonwealth Games team at the 1958 British Empire Games in Cardiff, Wales, participating in one event, the marathon race.

He emigrated to Australia in 1966, where he died in 1974.
