= Athletics at the 1958 British Empire and Commonwealth Games – Men's javelin throw =

Men's javelin throw at the Commonwealth Games
- Venue: Cardiff Arms Park
- Winning distance: 71.29 m

Medalists
gold medal	Colin Smith	England
silver medal	Jalal Khan	Pakistan
bronze medal	Hans Moks	Canada

The men's javelin throw event at the 1958 British Empire and Commonwealth Games was held on 19 July at the Cardiff Arms Park in Cardiff, Wales.

== Results ==
Rank	Name	Nationality	Result	Notes
1st place, gold medalist(s)	Colin Smith	England	233 ft 10 1/2 in (71.29 m)	
2nd place, silver medalist(s)	Jalal Khan	Pakistan	232 ft 4 1/2 in (70.83 m)	
3rd place, bronze medalist(s)	Hans Moks	Canada	231 ft 0 in (70.41 m)	
4	Dick Miller	Northern Ireland	219 ft 8 in (66.95 m)	
5	Viliame Liga	Fiji	219 ft 6 in (66.90 m)	
6	Peter Cullen	England	219 ft 6 in (66.90 m)	
7	Raymond Davies	England	218 ft 1 1/2 in (66.48 m)	
8	Muhammad Nawaz	Pakistan	216 ft 11 1/2 in (66.13 m)	
9	Nicholas Birks	Australia	214 ft 2 in (65.28 m)	
10	Clive Loveland	England	210 ft 6 in (64.16 m)	
11	Kevin Flanagan	Southern Rhodesia	206 ft 4 1/2 in (62.90 m)	
12	Brian Sexton	Wales	206 ft 1 1/2 in (62.83 m)	
13	Malcolm Hahn	New Zealand	204 ft 9 1/2 in (62.42 m)	
14	Norman Watkins	Wales	196 ft 10 in (59.99 m)	
15	Patrick Ozieh	Nigeria	182 ft 0 in (55.47 m)	
