= Glyn Morgan (swimmer) =

British swimmer

Personal information
- Nationality: British (Welsh)
- Born: Q4. 1939 Newport, Wales

Sport
- Sport: Swimming
- Event: Freestyle
- Club: Newport SC

Glyn C. Morgan (born 1939) is a former Welsh swimmer who specialised in freestyle and competed at the Commonwealth Games.

== Biography ==
Morgan, born in Newport, was an apprentice chemist and was a member of the Newport Swimming Club. At the age of 17, he won the 1957 Welsh mile championship at Swansea Bay. He was the first Welshman to finish in the 1957 Taff Swim and retained the 1958 half-mile title.

He represented the Welsh team at the 1958 British Empire and Commonwealth Games in Cardiff, Wales, where he competed in the 110 yards freestyle and helped Wales secure a fifth place finish in the final of the men's 220 yards freestyle relay relay, with Brian Flook, David Glasenbury and Mike Edwards.

After the Games, Morgan and Flook were favourites going into the 1958 Taff Swim and also swam for South Wales against West of England at the Television gala in Bristol.
