= Syd Lingard =

Welsh diver

Personal information
- Nationality: British (Welsh)
- Born: 22 February 1932 Cardiff, Wales
- Died: 17 August 2024 Penarth, Wales

Sport
- Sport: Diving
- Event: Platform
- Club: Cardiff Shiverers S.C.

William Sydney Lingard (22 February 1932 – 17 August 2024) was a Welsh diver, who competed at the 1958 British Empire and Commonwealth Games (now Commonwealth Games).

== Biography ==
Lingard was a member of the Cardiff Shiverers Swimming Club and won all four national diving events at the 1958 Welsh Championships.

Lingard represented the 1958 Welsh team at the 1958 British Empire and Commonwealth Games in Cardiff, Wales, where he participated in the 10 metres platform event.

His wife Gwynedd Lewis-Lingard was one of Britain's leading gymnasts and competed at two Olympic Games.
