= León Mejía =

Colombian cyclist (born 1934)

Personal information
- Born: 1934 (age 91–92)

Cycling career
- Sport: Cycling

León Angel Mejía (born 1934) is a Colombian former cyclist. He competed in the sprint event at the 1956 Summer Olympics.
