= Jennifer King (fencer) =

Welsh fencer

Personal information
- Nationality: British (Welsh)
- Born: Wales

Sport
- Sport: Fencing
- Event: Foil
- Club: Cardiff Fencing Club

Jennifer M. King married name Stewart was a fencer from Wales, who competed at the 1958 British Empire and Commonwealth Games (now Commonwealth Games).

== Biography ==
King was educated at Lady Margaret High School for Girls in Cardiff and won the 1954 British Schoolgirls Championships title. She was a member of the Cardiff Fencing Club.

She represented the 1958 Welsh team at the 1958 British Empire and Commonwealth Games in Cardiff, Wales, where she participated in the individual foil event.

In 1994 she lived in Dinas Powys and was a retired sales executive.
