= Gwyn Humphries =

Welsh cyclist

Personal information
- Nationality: British (Welsh)

Sport
- Sport: Cycling
- Events: Track and Road
- Club: Acme Wheelers, Rhondda

Gwyn Humphries is a former racing cyclist from Wales, who represented Wales at the British Empire Games (now Commonwealth Games).

== Biography ==
Humphries was a member of the Acme Wheelers in Rhondda. In 1958, he finished runner-up to Ray Richards in the 5-minute individual pursuit at the Cardiff Cycling Clubs' Association's track racing league meeting.

Humphries was a dental mechanic in Tonyrefail by profession, when he gained the team award at the 25 miles South Wales championships.

He represented the 1958 Welsh Team at the 1958 British Empire and Commonwealth Games in Cardiff, Wales, participating in two cycling program events; the individual pursuit and the scratch race.
