= The Boat Race 1959 =

105th Boat Race
- Date: 28 March 1959
- Winner: Oxford
- Margin of victory: 6 lengths
- Winning time: 18 minutes 52 seconds
- Overall record (Cambridge–Oxford): 58–46
- Umpire: George Douglas Clapperton (Oxford)

The 105th Boat Race took place on 28 March 1959. Held annually, the Boat Race is a side-by-side rowing race between crews from the Universities of Oxford and Cambridge along the River Thames. It was won by Oxford by six lengths in a time of 18 minutes 52 seconds, their first victory in five years. The victory took the overall record to 58–46 in Cambridge's favour.

During the buildup to the race, a number of the returning Oxford crew attempted to oust both coach Hugh "Jumbo" Edwards and Oxford University Boat Club president Ronnie Howard. Cambridge stated that they would only row against the president's crew and Oxford's college boat club captains voted in favour of Howard.

== Background ==
The Boat Race is a side-by-side rowing competition between the University of Oxford (sometimes referred to as the "Dark Blues") and the University of Cambridge (sometimes referred to as the "Light Blues"). First held in 1829, the race takes place on the 4.2-mile (6.8 km) Championship Course on the River Thames in southwest London. The rivalry is a major point of honour between the two universities; it is followed throughout the United Kingdom and as of 2014, broadcast worldwide. Cambridge went into the race as reigning champions, having won the 1958 race by 3 1/2 lengths, and led overall with 58 victories to Oxford's 45 (excluding the "dead heat" of 1877). Cambridge had won the four previous races, and had lost only three times since the Second World War.

Cambridge were coached by Harry Almond (who rowed for Cambridge in the 1950 and 1951 races), James Crowden (who rowed twice for Cambridge, in the 1951 and 1952 races), Harold Rickett (who rowed in the 1930, 1931 and 1932 races) and J. J. Vernon (who rowed in the 1955 race). Oxford's coach was Olympic rower Hugh "Jumbo" Edwards who had spectacularly collapsed in the 1926 race, and returned to the Oxford Blue Boat for the 1930 race. The race was umpired by George Douglas Clapperton who had coxed Oxford in the 1923 and 1924 races. He later umpired in the 1967 boat race.

The 1958 Dark Blue boat was "built around" 6 ft 4 in (1.93 m) tall Yale graduate Reed Rubin and that year's loss created friction, so much so that he and the other Oxford Blues suggested that Edwards should go to the United States to see the coaching methods that helped the successful Yale crew which contributed seven of the nine crew in the gold medal-winning men's eight at the 1956 Summer Olympics. Rubin himself stood for Oxford University Boat Club presidency against Ronnie Howard (who had rowed for Isis the previous year). Although standing in opposition, Howard agreed with Rubin that more emphasis should be placed on technique than fitness training. Howard was elected, by a single vote, and took the responsibility of selecting both the coach and the crew.

In late 1958, Rubin urged Howard to adopt the Yale training regime and to drop Edwards for a Yale coach, or even Rubin himself. Howard refused, and Rubin decided to prepare a crew of his own which would include all six of the returning Blues and new recruits such as American Olympic gold medallist Charlie Grimes. He demanded of Howard that his "pirate" crew be allowed to train independently and challenged him to race for the right to represent Oxford in the Boat Race. Howard refused, stating of the mutineers "if they maintain their point of view I shall do without them ... I have no sympathy for these people". At a meeting of boat club captains to discuss the future of the Torpids, Howard was presented with a letter offering him their full support. Cambridge University Boat Club president Mike Maltby, in an interview with student newspaper Varsity, supported Howard by stating that the Light Blues would not row against any crew that did not have the full support of the Oxford president. Rubin stated that he would not row in Howard's boat under any circumstances – the mutiny was quashed.

== Crews ==
The Cambridge crew weighed an average of 12 st 13.75 lb (82.2 kg), 1 pound (0.5 kg) per rower more than their opponents. Oxford's crew included four of the former rebels, Douglas-Mann, Fage, Edwards and cox Julian Rowbotham. Cambridge saw three rowers with Boat Race experience return to the crew: J. R. Giles, D. C. Christie and Maltby. Cox James Sulley also returned to steer the boat for a second year. There were no non-British registered participants in the race.

Seat	Oxford			Cambridge		
Seat	Name	College	Weight	Name	College	Weight
Bow	S. C. H. Douglas-Mann	St Edmund Hall	12 st 5 lb	J. R. Owen	Lady Margaret	11 st 8 lb
2	A. T. Lindsay	Magdalen	12 st 8 lb	J. R. Giles	Emmanuel	12 st 8 lb
3	R. L. Howard (P)	Worcester	13 st 10 lb	T. C. Heywood-Lonsdale	Trinity	13 st 6 lb
4	D. C. Rutherford	Magdalen	13 st 0 lb	B. M. P. Thompson-McCausland	Trinity	12 st 9 lb
5	J. L. Fage	St Edmund Hall	13 st 3 lb	G. H. Brown	Trinity Hall	13 st 9 lb
6	D. C. R. Edwards	Christ Church	13 st 2 lb	J. Beveridge	Jesus	13 st 1 lb
7	D. W. Shaw	Keble	13 st 0 lb	D. C. Christie	Pembroke	14 st 2 lb
Stroke	J. R. H. Lander	Christ Church	12 st 4 lb	M. B. Maltby (P)	Pembroke	12 st 9 lb
Cox	J. G. Rowbotham	Hertford	9 st 1 lb	J. S. Sulley	Selwyn	8 st 9 lb
Source: (P) – boat club president

== Race ==
The Championship Course along which the Boat Race is contested

Cambridge won the toss and elected to start from the Surrey station, handing the Middlesex side of the river to Oxford. Clapperton started the race at 3:15 p.m. in good conditions with a light breeze. Although Cambridge started at a higher stroke rate, Oxford held a canvas-length lead after the first minute. Still outrating the Dark Blues, Cambridge steered towards opponents who held a half-length lead by Craven Steps. Rowbotham held his course, steering close to Beverley Brook, before taking a clear water advantage. Sulley dropped the Cambridge boat in behind Oxford, with a quarter of a length of open water between the two as they passed the Mile Post. The Dark Blues reduced their rating but still passed below Hammersmith Bridge with an eight-second advantage. Despite a spurt from Maltby, Oxford reached Chiswick Steps twelve seconds ahead, and by Barnes Bridge were five lengths up. Oxford continued to draw away and won by six lengths in a time of 18 minutes 52 seconds. It was Oxford's largest margin of victory since the 1912 race, and their fastest time since the 1911 race.

According to the rowing correspondent of The Times, "everything went exactly according to the book, an occurrence so rare that a good many people doubted that it could happen." A writer for The Illustrated London News stated that "the result was a great triumph for Group Captain H. R. A. Edwards, Oxford's sole coach, and for R. L. Howard, the Oxford President, who had to deal with the revolt — over rowing styles — in the Boat Club last autumn."
