= Jocelyn Hooper =

British swimmer (1943–2008)

Personal information
- Nationality: British (Welsh)
- Born: January 1943 Newport, Wales
- Died: 2008 Canada

Sport
- Sport: Swimming
- Event: Freestyle
- Club: Newport SC

Jocelyn Claire Hooper later Winkless (January 1943 – 2008) was a Welsh swimmer who specialised in freestyle and competed at the Commonwealth Games.

== Biography ==
Hooper was born Newport, Wales, the daughter of Wilfred and Bernice Hooper and attended St. Julians High School. She was a member of the Newport Swimming Club and her mother Bernice was the 1958 Welsh Commonwealth Games swimming team manager. In 1958 held the Welsh senior freestyle titles over 55, 110 and 220 yards, in addition to holding the Welsh junior records over 100 and 110 yards.

Hooper was a three-time winner of prestigious Taff Swim held in Roath Park Lake in 1958, 1961 and 1962.

She represented the Welsh team at the 1958 British Empire and Commonwealth Games in Cardiff, Wales, where she competed in the 110 and 440 yards freestyle events and helped Wales secure two sixth place finishes in the finals of the women's 110 yards freestyle relay, with Geraldine Francis, Gillian Howells and Jacqueline Townsend and the women's 110 yards medley relay, with Geraldine Francis, Gillian Howells, Diana Davies and Joyce Dixon.

Four years later, she represented Wales again at the 1962 British Empire and Commonwealth Games.

Hooper studied Geology at the University of Wales and also took a physical education teaching diploma at the University College of Wales, Aberystwyth. Hooper represented Wales in international competition every year from 1956 to 1968 and in 1966 she married Philip Winkless.

The couple emigrated to Winnipeg, Canada, where she died in 2008
