= John Hewitt (swimmer) =

British swimmer

Personal information
- Nationality: British (Welsh)
- Born: 29 January 1941 Newport, Wales
- Died: 2017 Newport, Wales

Sport
- Sport: Swimming
- Event(s): Breaststroke, butterfly, medley
- Club: Newport SC

John Charles Hewitt (29 January 1941 – 2017) is a former Welsh swimmer who specialised in breaststroke and competed at the Commonwealth Games.

== Biography ==
Hewitt was born in Newport, Wales, and attended Newport High School. He was a member of the Newport Swimming Club and although primarily a breaststroke swimmer he was also competent at butterfly and medley.

He represented the Welsh team at the 1958 British Empire and Commonwealth Games in Cardiff, Wales, where he competed in the 220 yards breaststroke event.

After the Games he won the Calloway Cup for Wales as a cadet for the Newport High School squadron and in 1959 won his third successive Welsh national breaststroke title and won the 150 metres medley title.
