= Guglielmo Pesenti =

Italian cyclist (1933–2002)

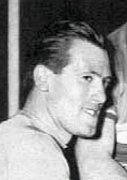
- Guglielmo Pesenti

Personal information
- Full name: Guglielmo Pesenti
- Born: 18 December 1933 Sedrina, Italy
- Died: 12 July 2002 (aged 68) Bergamo, Italy

Cycling career
- Sport: Cycling
- Discipline: Track
- Role: Rider
Medal record
Men's track cycling
Representing Italy
Olympic Games
Silver medal – second place	1956 Melbourne	Individual sprint

Guglielmo Pesenti (18 December 1933 – 12 July 2002) was an Italian racing cyclist.

He competed for Italy at the 1956 Summer Olympics, held in Melbourne, Australia, in the individual sprint event where he finished in second place.
