= Jimmy Todd (long distance runner) =

Northern Irish athlete

Personal information
- Nationality: British (Northern Irish)
- Born: c.1922
- Died: April 2003

Sport
- Sport: Athletics
- Event: Long-distance
- Club: East Antrim Harriers

James Todd (1922 – April 2003) was an athlete from Northern Ireland, who represented Northern Ireland at the British Empire and Commonwealth Games (now Commonwealth Games).

== Biography ==
Todd was a member of the East Antrim Harriers Athletics Club and represented Ireland at international level.

Todd was named by the Northern Ireland AAA in the final 1958 Northern Irish Team for the forthcoming Empire and Commonwealth Games. He subsequently competed at the 1958 British Empire and Commonwealth Games in Cardiff, Wales, participating in the one athletics event; the marathon.

He was the athletics team captain at the Games and continued to compete in various athletic pursuits into his 60's. He died in 2003.
