= Gwyneth Lewis (sprinter) =

Welsh athlete

Personal information
- Nationality: British (Welsh)
- Born: 1938 Anglesey, Wales

Sport
- Sport: Athletics
- Event: Sprints
- Club: Holyhead Athletics Club

Gwyneth Lewis (born 1938) is a former track and field athlete from Wales, who competed at the 1958 British Empire and Commonwealth Games (now Commonwealth Games).

== Biography ==
Lewis was educated at Holyhead County Secondary School and was a member of their athletics club. She was the 100 yards champion of Wales in both 1956 and 1957, in addition to holding the Welsh record at 11.4 seconds.

In June 1958 represented North Wales against South Wales in a warm up event before the Empire Games, finishing third behind Bonny Jones in the 100 yards event and third behind Jean Whitehead in the 220 yards event.

She represented the 1958 Welsh team at the 1958 British Empire and Commonwealth Games in Cardiff, Wales, where she participated in three events; the 100 yards, the 220 yards and the 4 × 110 yards relay with Bonny Jones, Ellen Grainger, and Jean Whitehead. In the relay the Welsh team were denied a place in the final after being disqualified following an illegal baton change.

At the time of the Games, Lewis was training at Normal College, Bangor.
