= Michael Howard (fencer) =

British fencer (born 1928)

Personal information
- Nationality: British (English)
- Born: 24 December 1928 (age 97) Richmond, London, England

Sport
- Sport: Fencing
- Event: Épée
Medal record
Men's fencing
Representing Great Britain
Olympic Games
| Silver medal – second place | 1960 Rome | Épée, team |
Representing England
British Empire & Commonwealth Games
| Gold medal – first place | 1958 Cardiff | Épée, team |
| Silver medal – second place | 1958 Cardiff | Épée, individual |
| Gold medal – first place | 1962 Perth | Épée, team |

Michael John Peter Howard (born 24 December 1928) is a British fencer. He won a silver medal in the team épée event at the 1960 Summer Olympics.

== Biography ==
Howard represented the England team and won a gold medal in the épée, team and a silver medal on the épée, individual at the 1958 British Empire and Commonwealth Games in Cardiff, Wales.

Four years later he won another gold medal in the épée, team at the 1962 British Empire and Commonwealth Games in Perth, Western Australia.
