= Jack Dawson (long distance runner) =

Northern Irish athlete

Personal information
- Nationality: British (Northern Irish)
- Born: c.1926

Sport
- Sport: Athletics
- Event: Long-distance
- Club: Willowfield Harriers AC; Winnington AC; Pembroke Harriers, Liverpool

Jack Dawson (born c.1926) is a former athlete from Northern Ireland, who represented Northern Ireland at the British Empire and Commonwealth Games (now Commonwealth Games).

== Biography ==
Dawson was from Bloomfield in East Belfast and broke the Northern Irish marathon record at the Northern Ireland AAA championships in 1955 with a time of 3 hours, 38 minutes and 15 seconds. He was originally a member of the Willowfield Athletics Club and broke the Ulster marathon record while at the club. Later, he joined the Winnington Athletics Club in Northwich Cheshire, England, where he worked for Imperial Chemical Industries.

Dawson represented the 1958 Northern Irish Team at the 1958 British Empire and Commonwealth Games in Cardiff, Wales, participating in the one athletics event; the marathon.

In 1959, Dawson lived in Ash Road, Sandiway but left Winnington AC to join the Pembroke Harriers of Liverpool.
