= Alex McDougall =

Scottish athlete

Personal information
- Nationality: British (Scottish)

Sport
- Sport: Athletics
- Event(s): Long-distance, cross country, marathon
- Club: Vale of Leven AC

Alexander McDougall is a former track and field athlete from Scotland who competed at the 1958 British Empire and Commonwealth Games (now Commonwealth Games).

== Biography ==
McDougall was a member of the Vale of Leven Athletic Club and specialised in long distance running.

At the 1958 Scottish A.A.A. Championships, he finished runner-up to Hugo Fox in the marathon race.

He represented the Scottish Empire and Commonwealth Games team at the 1958 British Empire Games in Cardiff, Wales, participating in one event, the marathon race.

McDougall was also a Scottish international in cross country.
