= Alfie Fairweather =

Scottish cyclist

Personal information
- Nationality: British (Scottish)
- Born: c.1938 Scotland

Sport
- Sport: Cycling
- Event(s): Track and Road
- Club: Glasgow Wheelers

Alfie N. Fairweather (born c.1938) is a former racing cyclist from Scotland, who represented Scotland at the British Empire Games (now the Commonwealth Games).

== Biography ==
Fairweather, born in Scotland, was a member of the Glasgow Wheelers

He represented the 1958 Scottish Team at the 1958 British Empire and Commonwealth Games in Cardiff, Wales, participating in one cycling program event; the time trial

He won the 1960 Edina Couriers road race and competed in the 1961 "Milk to Stamina" road race, a 136 miles race and the longest ever to be held in Scotland to that point. He participated in the 1962 Tour of Britain and finished runner-up in stage 3.

At the 1962 British Empire and Commonwealth Games in Perth, Australia, he represented the 1962 Scottish team and participated in the road race and scratch events.

Fairweather was still racing and winning at the age of 40, claiming victory in the 1978 Tennent Caledonian Cycle Cup.
