= Athletics at the 1958 British Empire and Commonwealth Games – Women's long jump =

Women's long jump at the Commonwealth Games

The women's long jump event at the 1958 British Empire and Commonwealth Games was held on 26 July at the Cardiff Arms Park in Cardiff, Wales.

== Medalists ==
Gold	Silver	Bronze
Sheila Hoskin; England	Mary Bignal; England	Bev Watson; Australia

== Results ==
=== Qualification ===
Qualifying distance: 18 ft (5.49 m)

Rank	Name	Nationality	Result	Notes
?	Bev Watson	Australia	18 ft 11 3/4 in (5.78 m)	Q
?	Beverly Weigel	New Zealand	18 ft 11 3/4 in (5.78 m)	Q
9	Bronwen Jones	Wales	17 ft 8 3/4 in (5.40 m)	
10	Helen Frith	Australia	17 ft 8 1/2 in (5.40 m)	
11	Olu Onwuchekwa	Nigeria	17 ft 8 1/4 in (5.39 m)	
12	Violet Odogwu	Nigeria	17 ft 7 in (5.36 m)	
13	Florette Iyo	Nigeria	16 ft 11 in (5.16 m)	
14	Sally Jones	Wales	15 ft 5 in (4.70 m)	
	Maureen Rever	Canada	DNS	

=== Final ===
Rank	Name	Nationality	Result	Notes
1st place, gold medalist(s)	Sheila Hoskin	England	19 ft 9 in (6.02 m)	
2nd place, silver medalist(s)	Mary Bignal	England	19 ft 7 in (5.97 m)	
3rd place, bronze medalist(s)	Bev Watson	Australia	19 ft 7 in (5.97 m)	
4	Jean Whitehead	England	18 ft 11 3/4 in (5.78 m)	
5	Jessica Donaghy	New Zealand	18 ft 11 in (5.77 m)	
6	Marian Needham	England	18 ft 8 1/4 in (5.70 m)	
7	Thelma Hopkins	Northern Ireland	18 ft 2 3/4 in (5.56 m)	
	Beverly Weigel	New Zealand	NM	
