= Brian Sexton =

Welsh athlete

Personal information
- Nationality: British (Welsh)
- Born: c.1933 Porth, Wales

Sport
- Sport: Athletics
- Event: Javelin
- Club: Roath Harriers

Brian G. Sexton (born c.1933) is a former track and field athlete from Wales, who competed at the 1958 British Empire and Commonwealth Games (now Commonwealth Games).

== Biography ==
Sexton was a member of the Roath Harriers Athletics Club and in June 1958 represented South Wales against North Wales in a warm up event before the Empire Games, winning the javelin throw event.

He won the 1957 Welsh title but finished runner-up behind Norman Watkins at the 1958 AAA Welsh championships.

He represented the 1958 Welsh team at the 1958 British Empire and Commonwealth Games in Cardiff, Wales, where he participated in one event; the javelin throw.

At the time of the Games he was a draughtsman from Pontyclun.
