= Harold Cooke =

British fencer (1907–1986)

Personal information
- Nationality: British (English)
- Born: 29 May 1907
- Died: April 1986 (aged 78) Hereford, England

Sport
- Sport: Fencing
- Event: Foil
- Club: Salle Paul, London
Medal record
Fencing
Representing England
British Empire & Commonwealth Games
Gold medal – first place	1958 Cardiff	foil team

Harold Cooke (29 May 1907 – April 1986) was a British fencer who competed at the 1948 and 1952 Summer Olympics.

== Biography ==
At the Olympic Games, Cooke competed in the team foil events.

Cooke also represented the England team and won a gold medal in the team foil event at the 1958 British Empire and Commonwealth Games in Cardiff, Wales.
