= Bev Watson =

Australian long jumper

Beverley Watson
Medal record
Women's Athletics
Representing Australia
British Empire and Commonwealth Games
Bronze medal – third place	1958 Cardiff	Long Jump

Beverley Noeline Watson (January 1, 1942 – March 22, 2023) was an Australian long jumper who won a bronze medal in the women's long jump event at the 1958 British Empire and Commonwealth Games. En route to the Commonwealth Games, she was the Australian National Champion in the long jump.
