= Mike Edwards (swimmer) =

British swimmer

Personal information
- Nationality: British (Welsh)
- Born: Q2.1938 Romford, Essex, England

Sport
- Sport: Swimming
- Event: Freestyle
- Club: Maindee SC

Edward Michael Edwards (born 1938) is a former Welsh swimmer who specialised in freestyle and competed at the Commonwealth Games.

== Biography ==
Edwards, born in Essex, England, was a member of the Maindee Swimming Club.

In 1956 he won the prestigious Taff Swim held in Roath Park Lake.

During 1958 he was based in Malta with the Royal Air Force and held the Welsh titles over 110, 220 and 440 yards. He secured leave from the RAF in order to compete in the Commonwealth Games.

He won the Welsh 1958 A.S.A. Championships and subsequently represented the Welsh team at the 1958 British Empire and Commonwealth Games in Cardiff, Wales, where he competed in the 440 yards freestyle and 1650 yards freestyle events and helped Wales secure a fifth place finish in the final of the men's 220 yards freestyle relay relay, with Brian Flook, David Glasenbury and Glyn Morgan.

In 1962, he was a lieutenant in the Somerset and Cornwall Light Infantry and was nominated as Gibraltar's Sportsman of the Year. He had been posted there since August 1961 and won the Gibralatar swimming championships. The following year, Edwards was in the Parachute Regiment and won four British Army swimming titles.
