= Roger Maunder (fencer) =

Welsh fencer (born 1936)

Personal information
- Nationality: British (Welsh)
- Born: 1936

Sport
- Sport: Fencing
- Event: Sabre / épée
- Club: Royal Air Force
Medal record
Representing (Wales)
Commonwealth Games
Bronze medal – third place	1958 Cardiff	team sabre

Roger A. Maunder (born 1936) is a Welsh former fencer who won a bronze medal at the Commonwealth Games.

== Biography ==
Maunder from St Athan was a member of the Royal Air Force Fencing Club.

He was selected for the 1958 Welsh team for the 1958 British Empire and Commonwealth Games in Cardiff, Wales, where he competed in the épée and sabre events. He won a bronze medal in the team sabre with Malcolm Kerslake, John Preston and Ted Lucas .

At the time of the Games, both Maunder (a corporal) and his fencing teammate John Preston (a sergeant), were serving in the Royal Air Force base at Royal Air Force St Athan. Coincidentally the base was being used for the athlete's village for the Games.

Maunder went to a second Commonwealth Games when he represented the 1962 Welsh team at the 1962 British Empire and Commonwealth Games in Perth, Australia, where he participated in the foil and sabre events.
