= Colin Booth (swimmer) =

British swimmer

Personal information
- Nationality: British (Welsh)
- Born: 1 April 1939 Newport, Wales
- Died: April 1979 Newport, Wales

Sport
- Sport: Swimming
- Event: Backstroke
- Club: Maindee SC, Newport

Colin Charles Booth (1 April 1939 – April 1975) was a Welsh swimmer who competed at the Commonwealth Games.

== Biography ==
Booth was a member of the Maindee Swimming Club of Newport and specialised in backstroke. In 1955, Booth finished third behind John Brockway and Alban Stevens at the Newport swimming championships, establishing himself as a backstroke challenger to the leading pair in Wales.

In 1958 he was an apprentice plumber and represented the Welsh team at the 1958 British Empire and Commonwealth Games in Cardiff, Wales, where he competed in the 110 yards backstroke event and set a personal best time in the competition.
