= Gwynedd Lewis-Lingard =

British gymnast (born 1934)

Personal information
- Nationality: British
- Born: 28 December 1934 (age 91) Cardiff, Wales

Sport
- Sport: Gymnastics

Gwynedd Lewis-Lingard or Lingard (born 28 December 1934) is a British gymnast. She competed at the 1952 Summer Olympics and the 1960 Summer Olympics.

Lingard attended Cardiff Girls' Grammar School. She left early because her sporting activities did not leave her enough time to study. She worked in Boots the Chemist, but left because they would not give her time off to attend the Olympics; she was then employed at BSA Tools.

In 2002, Lingard was the director of the Welsh squad of disabled gymnasts. As of February 2018, Lewis-Lingard, then aged 83, was still actively involved with sport.

Her husband Syd Lingard was a diver and competed at the 1958 British Empire and Commonwealth Games.
