= Donal Smith =

New Zealand middle-distance runner and academic (1934–2023)

Personal information
- Full name: Donal Ian Brice Smith
- Born: 4 February 1934 Auckland, New Zealand
- Died: 27 September 2023 (aged 89)
- Spouse: Jill Evans (m. 1959)
- Children: 3

Academic background
- Education: Auckland Grammar School
- Alma mater: University of Auckland; Merton College, Oxford
- Thesis: An edition of The rehearsal transpros'd by Andrew Marvell, with introduction and commentary (1963)

Academic work
- Discipline: English literature
- Institutions: University of Toronto; University of Auckland

Sport
- Country: New Zealand
- Sport: Track and field
- Event: Middle-distance running

Achievements and titles
- Personal best: 800 m: 1:48.52

Donal Ian Brice Smith (4 February 1934 – 27 September 2023) was a New Zealand middle-distance runner and English literature academic. He represented his country at the 1958 British Empire and Commonwealth Games and 1960 Olympic Games, and was a professor of English at the University of Auckland from 1973 until his retirement in 2000.

== Early life and family ==
Smith was born in Auckland, New Zealand, on 4 February 1934, the son of Bruce and Judy (née Jaffray) Smith. He was educated at Auckland Grammar School and at University of Auckland, taking a BA in 1954 and an MA the following year. After a brief period lecturing at Auckland, he was the inaugural recipient of the Eliot Davis Memorial Scholarship in 1956, which provided for three years of study at either Cambridge or Oxford. Later that year, he matriculated at Merton College, Oxford, spending the next four years studying for his DPhil. His doctoral thesis was titled An edition of The rehearsal transpros'd by Andrew Marvell, with introduction and commentary.

In 1959, Smith married Marjory Jill Evans, with whom he later had three children.

== Athletic career ==
In 1958, Smith finished fifth in the final of the 880 yards at the British Empire and Commonwealth Games in Cardiff. At the 1960 Summer Olympics, he was eliminated in the quarter-final of the 800 metres.

== Academic career ==
After a period at the University of Toronto, Smith was appointed a professor of English at the University of Auckland in 1973. When he retired in 2000, he was accorded the title of professor emeritus.

== Death ==
Smith died on 27 September 2023, at the age of 89.
