= Norman Watkins =

Welsh athlete

Personal information
- Nationality: British (Welsh)
- Born: 15 February 1934 Sunbury-on-Thames, England
- Died: 2 November 1977 (aged 43) Jamestown, Rhode Island, USA
- Height: 198 cm (6 ft 6 in)

Sport
- Sport: Athletics
- Event: Javelin / Long jump
- Club: Birmingham University Athletics Club

Norman David Watkins (born 15 February 1934 – 2 November 1977) was an English born track and field athlete who competed for Wales at the 1958 British Empire and Commonwealth Games (now Commonwealth Games).

== Biography ==
Watkins was born in Sunbury-on-Thames but his parents were from Tonyrefail. He studied Geophysics at the University of Birmingham and was a member of their athletics club.

Watkins excelled at long jump and decathlon but his career was almost finished by a serious knee injury, which resulted in him switching to the javelin. He defeated Brian Sexton in winning the javelin event at the 1958 AAA Welsh championships.

He represented the 1958 Welsh team at the 1958 British Empire and Commonwealth Games in Cardiff, Wales, where he participated in one event; the javelin throw.

Watkins became a noted scientist and at the time of his death in 1977, he was the Professor at the Graduate School of Oceanography of the University of Rhode Island.
