= Malcolm Kerslake =

Welsh fencer (born 1929)

Personal information
- Nationality: British (Welsh)
- Born: 1929 Cardiff, Wales

Sport
- Sport: Fencing
- Event: foil / sabre / épée
- Club: Phoenix Sword Club
Medal record
Representing (Wales)
Commonwealth Games
Bronze medal – third place	1958 Cardiff	team foil
Bronze medal – third place	1958 Cardiff	team sabre

Malcolm V. Kerslake (born 1929) is a Welsh former fencer who won two bronze medals at the Commonwealth Games.

== Biography ==
Kerslake who lived in Bristol was both a Welsh épée and sabre champion.

He was selected for the 1958 Welsh team for the 1958 British Empire and Commonwealth Games in Cardiff, Wales, where he competed in the foil and sabre events.

He won two bronze medals in the team sabre with John Preston, Roger Maunder and Ted Lucas and the team foil with John Preston and John Evans.

A member of the Phoenix Sword Club, he finished runner-up to Colin Hillier at the 1958 Gloucestershire men's foil championship but shortly afterwards in January 1959 he won the Gloucestershire épée title.
