= Athletics at the 1958 British Empire and Commonwealth Games – Men's pole vault =

Men's pole vault at the Commonwealth Games

The men's pole vault event at the 1958 British Empire and Commonwealth Games was held on 25 and 26 July at the Cardiff Arms Park in Cardiff, Wales.

== Medalists ==
Gold	Silver	Bronze
Geoff Elliott; England	Robert Reid; Canada	Merv Richards; New Zealand

== Results ==
=== Qualification ===
Qualifying height: 13 ft (3.96 m)

Rank	Name	Nationality	Result	Notes
?	Rex Porter	England	13 ft 0 in (3.96 m)	Q
?	Geoff Elliott	England	13 ft 0 in (3.96 m)	Q
?	Allah Ditta	Pakistan	13 ft 0 in (3.96 m)	Q
?	Merv Richards	New Zealand	13 ft 0 in (3.96 m)	Q
?	Robert Reid	Canada	13 ft 0 in (3.96 m)	Q
?	Glen Cividin	Canada	13 ft 0 in (3.96 m)	Q
?	Ian Ward	England	13 ft 0 in (3.96 m)	Q
?	Wadi Khan	Pakistan	13 ft 0 in (3.96 m)	Q
9	Hendrick Kruger	South Africa	12 ft 9 in (3.89 m)	
10	Maxwell Gee	Australia	12 ft 6 in (3.81 m)	
11	Joshua Olotu	Nigeria	12 ft 6 in (3.81 m)	
11	Colin Fletcher	Wales	12 ft 0 in (3.66 m)	
13	O. Oriakhi	Nigeria	11 ft 6 in (3.51 m)	
13	John Neill	Wales	11 ft 6 in (3.51 m)	

=== Final ===
Rank	Name	Nationality	Result	Notes
1st place, gold medalist(s)	Geoff Elliott	England	13 ft 8 in (4.17 m)	
2nd place, silver medalist(s)	Robert Reid	Canada	13 ft 8 in (4.17 m)	
3rd place, bronze medalist(s)	Merv Richards	New Zealand	13 ft 8 in (4.17 m)	
4	Allah Ditta	Pakistan	13 ft 4 in (4.06 m)	
5	Ian Ward	England	13 ft 0 in (3.96 m)	
6	Wadi Khan	Pakistan	13 ft 0 in (3.96 m)	
7	Rex Porter	England	12 ft 6 in (3.81 m)	
8	Glen Cividin	Canada	12 ft 6 in (3.81 m)	
