= Geraldine Francis =

British swimmer (1942–1977)

Personal information
- Nationality: British (Welsh)
- Born: 12 July 1942 Newport, Wales
- Died: October 1977 Pontypool, Wales

Sport
- Sport: Swimming
- Events: Butterfly, Freestyle
- Club: Newport SC

Geraldine Margaret Francis (12 July 1942 – October 1977) was a Welsh swimmer who specialised in butterfly and freestyle and competed at the Commonwealth Games.

== Biography ==
Francis was born in Newport, Wales and attended Newport Technical College. She was a member of the Newport Swimming Club and won ten swimming events during 1957 and broke the Welsh record for the 440 yards freestyle, with a time of 5 min 35.8 sec, in addition to winning both the senior and junior butterfly titles.

Francis was a three-time winner of the prestigious Taff Swim held in Roath Park Lake in 1957, 1959 and 1960.

She represented the Welsh team at the 1958 British Empire and Commonwealth Games in Cardiff, Wales, where she competed in the 110 yds butterfly event and helped Wales secure two sixth place finishes in the finals of the women's 110 yards freestyle relay, with Jocelyn Hooper, Gillian Howells and Jacqueline Townsend and the women's 110 yards medley relay, with Jocelyn Hooper, Gillian Howells, Diana Davies and Joyce Dixon.

In 1960 she broke the Welsh one mile freestyle record in Pontypridd, with a time of 24 min 48.8 sec. The following year in 1961 she married fellow international swimmer Brian Flook.
