= Athletics at the 1958 British Empire and Commonwealth Games – Men's marathon =

Men's marathon at the Commonwealth Games

The men's marathon event at the 1958 British Empire and Commonwealth Games was held on 24 July starting and finishing at the Cardiff Arms Park in Cardiff, Wales.

== Results ==
Rank	Name	Nationality	Time	Notes
1st place, gold medalist(s)	Dave Power	Australia	2:22:46	
2nd place, silver medalist(s)	Johannes Barnard	South Africa	2:22:58	
3rd place, bronze medalist(s)	Peter Wilkinson	England	2:24:42	
4	Eddie Kirkup	England	2:27:32	
5	Gordon Dickson	Canada	2:28:43	
6	Colin Kemball	England	2:29:18	
7	Alex McDougall	Scotland	2:29:58	
8	Arap Kanuti	Kenya	2:30:50	
9	Rhys Davies	Wales	2:30:55	
10	Ron Franklin	Wales	2:31:25	
11	John Russell	Australia	2:34:57	
12	Arthur Keily	England	2:35:00	
13	Martinus Wild	South Africa	2:36:08	
14	Raymond Puckett	New Zealand	2:38:59	
15	Dyfrig Rees	Wales	2:39:18	
16	David John Dodds	Southern Rhodesia	2:45:20	
17	William Kelly	Isle of Man	2:50:37	
18	Tom Wood	Wales	2:53:42	
19	Jimmy Todd	Northern Ireland	3:01.28	
20	John Henning	Northern Ireland	3:07:51	
21	Walter Dass	British Guiana	3:08:58	
	Hugo Fox	Scotland	DNF	
	Harry Fenion	Scotland	DNF	
	Jack Dawson	Northern Ireland	DNF	
	Sew Etwaroo	British Guiana	DNF	
	Chepsiror Chepkwony	Kenya	DNS	
