= Jean Whitehead (sprinter) =

Welsh athlete (1934–2023)

Personal information
- Nationality: British (Welsh)
- Born: 1 September 1934 Cardiff, Wales
- Died: 28 June 2023 (aged 88) London, England

Sport
- Sport: Athletics
- Event: Sprints / Long jump
- Club: Middlesex Ladies AC

Jean Anne Whitehead (née Docker; 1 September 1934 – 28 June 2023) was a Welsh track and field athlete, who competed at the 1958 British Empire and Commonwealth Games (now Commonwealth Games).

== Biography ==
Jean Anne Docker was born on 1 September 1934 in Cardiff, but lived in London and was a member of the Middlesex Ladies Athletic Club. and by 1958 was a 11-times Welsh champion over 100, 220 and 440 yard and the long jump. Docker married Edward Whitehead in London during 1957 and competed under her married name thereafter.

In June 1958 Whitehead represented South Wales against North Wales in a warm up event before the Empire Games, winning the 220 yards event and finishing runner-up behind Bronwen Jones in the 100 yards event. She also won the double at the 1958 AAA Welsh championships, winning both the 100 yards and 220 yards events (her 12th and 13th titles).

She represented the 1958 Welsh team at the 1958 British Empire and Commonwealth Games in Cardiff, Wales, where she participated in three events; the 100 yards, the 220 yards and the 4 × 110 yards relay, with Bonny Jones, Ellen Grainger and Gwyneth Lewis. In the relay the Welsh team were denied a place in the final after being disqualified following an illegal baton change.

Whitehead died in London on 28 June 2023, aged 88.
