= John Henning (long distance runner) =

Northern Irish athlete

Personal information
- Nationality: British (Northern Irish)
- Born: c.1910 Belfast, Northern Ireland
- Died: November 1999 Belfast, Northern Ireland

Sport
- Sport: Athletics
- Event: Long-distance
- Club: Duncairn Nomads AC

John A. Henning (1910 – 1999) was an athlete from Northern Ireland, who represented Northern Ireland at the British Empire and Commonwealth Games (now Commonwealth Games).

== Biography ==
Henning was a member of the Duncairn Nomads Athletics Club in North Belfast and by 1947 was the Irish marathon champion and record holder. A lorry driver by profession, he trained for the 1948 Summer Olympics but failed to make the Great Britain team.

He won ten consecutive Northern Ireland marathon championships up until 1954 but at the 1956 Northern Ireland Championships he collapsed after twenty miles of the marathon.

Henning was named by the Northern Ireland AAA in the final 1958 Northern Irish Team for the forthcoming Empire and Commonwealth Games. He subsequently competed at the 1958 British Empire and Commonwealth Games in Cardiff, Wales, participating in the one athletics event; the marathon.

He organised the Shankill Festival of Running for 42 years. He died in 1999.
