= Boris Romanov (cyclist) =

Soviet cyclist

Personal information
- Full name: Boris Nikolayevich Romanov
- Born: 27 February 1937 Tula, Soviet Union
- Died: 10 February 2014 (aged 76) Tula, Russia

Cycling career
- Sport: Cycling

Boris Nikolayevich Romanov (Russian: Бори́с Никола́евич Рома́нов; 27 February 1937 – 10 February 2014) was a Soviet cyclist. He competed in the sprint event at the 1956 Summer Olympics.
