= Educational Policy =

- Discipline: Education policy
- Language: English
- Edited by: Ana M. Martinez Aleman

Publication details
- History: 1987-present
- Publisher: SAGE Publishing
- Frequency: 7/year
- Impact factor: 1.586 (2017)

Standard abbreviations
- ISO 4: Educ. Policy

Indexing
- ISSN: 0895-9048 (print); 1552-3896 (web)
- LCCN: 93664314
- OCLC no.: 15342052

Links
- Journal homepage; Online access; Online archive

Educational Policy is a peer-reviewed academic journal that covers the field of education policy. The editor-in-chief is Ana M. Martinez Aleman (Boston College). The journal was established in 1987 and is published by SAGE Publishing.

== Abstracting and indexing ==
The journal is abstracted and indexed in Scopus, Social Sciences Citation Index, EBSCO, ProQuest, ERIC, and Wilson Education Index/Abstracts. According to the Journal Citation Reports, its 2017 impact factor is 1.586, ranking it 93rd out of 238 journals in the category "Education and Educational Research".
