= Jim Darragh =

Northern Irish cyclist

Personal information
- Nationality: British (Northern Irish)
- Born: c.1930

Sport
- Sport: Cycling
- Event(s): Track and Road
- Club: Northern CC, Belfast; Fallowfield, Manchester

Jim Darragh (born c.1930) is a former racing cyclist from Northern Ireland, who represented Northern Ireland at the British Empire Games (now Commonwealth Games).

== Biography ==
Darragh was a member of the Northern Cycling Club of Belfast and in 1956 retained his 1,000 metres championship of Ireland.

A painter by profession he lived at Halliday Road until he moved to Manchester and joined the Fallowfield club.

He represented the 1958 Northern Irish Team at the 1958 British Empire and Commonwealth Games in Cardiff, Wales, participating in three cycling program events; the time trial, the sprint and the scratch race
