= Lesley Locke =

Scottish footballer

Les Locke
Personal information
- Full name: Lesley Cameron Locke
- Date of birth: 24 January 1934
- Place of birth: Perth, Scotland
- Date of death: 1996 (aged 61–62)
- Place of death: Durban, South Africa
- Position: Inside forward

Senior career*
Years	Team	Apps	(Gls)
- Bromley
1956–1960	Queens Park Rangers	76	(24)
- Guildford City

International career
1956–1958	Scotland amateur	5	(1)
- * Club domestic league appearances and goals

Lesley Cameron Locke (24 January 1934 – 1996) was a Scottish footballer, who played in the Football League for Queens Park Rangers and a track and field athlete from Scotland who competed at the 1958 British Empire and Commonwealth Games (now Commonwealth Games).

== Football ==
Locke also made guest appearances for Tottenham Hotspur. He remained an amateur after joining QPR, gaining three caps for the Scotland national amateur football team in addition to two he had collected while at Bromley.

== Athletics ==
Locke ran for the London University athletics club and represented the Scottish Empire and Commonwealth Games team at the 1958 British Empire Games in Cardiff, Wales, participating in one event, the 880 yards race.
