= Rhys Davies (athlete) =

Welsh athlete (born c.1930)

Personal information
- Nationality: British (Welsh)
- Born: c.1930 Wales

Sport
- Sport: Athletics
- Event: Long-distance / cross-country
- Club: Coventry Godiva Harriers

Rhys B. Davies (born c.1930) is a former track and field athlete from Wales, who competed at the 1958 British Empire and Commonwealth Games (now Commonwealth Games).

== Biography ==
Davies was a member of the Coventry Godiva Harriers and in March 1957, he finished behind Norman Horrell during the 1957 Welsh cross-country championships.

Davies was a physical training teacher, a Welsh international runner and won the marathon at the 1958 AAA Welsh championships.

Davies represented the 1958 Welsh team at the 1958 British Empire and Commonwealth Games in Cardiff, Wales, where he participated in one event; the marathon race.

Davies also coached Alvechurch FC in the mid 1960s including the 1965–66 season when the club reached he semi-finals of the FA Amateur Cup, eventually losing 1–0 to Wealdstone at Stamford Bridge with around 10,000 supporters travelling to London for the game.
