= Cynthia Shaddick =

British swimmer

Personal information
- Nationality: British (Welsh)
- Born: 12 July 1944 (age 81) West Glamorgan, Wales

Sport
- Sport: Swimming
- Event: Breaststroke
- Club: Swansea SC

Cynthia Eileen Shaddick (born 12 July 1944) is a former Welsh swimmer who specialised in breaststroke and competed at two Commonwealth Games in 1958 and 1962.

== Biography ==
Shaddick was born in West Glamorgan, Wales, and broke the Welsh junior record over 110 yards breaststroke. In April 1958, she won the breaststroke event in the international match gainst Germany to celebrate the opening of the new Wales Empire Pool.

She represented the Welsh team at the 1958 British Empire and Commonwealth Games in Cardiff, Wales, where she competed in the 220 yards breaststroke event.

She swam for the Swansea Swimming Club and represented Wales again at the 1962 British Empire and Commonwealth Games in Perth, Australia.

In 1965 she married Richard Beresford in Swansea.
