= Haydn Tawton =

Welsh athlete (born c.1937)

Personal information
- Nationality: British (Welsh)
- Born: c.1937 Glamorgan, Wales

Sport
- Sport: Athletics
- Event: Middle-distance
- Club: Roath Harriers

Haydn G. Tawton (born c.1937) is a former track and field athlete from Wales, who competed at the 1958 British Empire and Commonwealth Games (now Commonwealth Games).

== Biography ==
Tawton studied at Cardiff University and was a member of the Roath Harriers. In June 1958 he represented South Wales against North Wales in a warm up event before the Empire Games, winning the 880 yards event.

He represented the 1958 Welsh team at the 1958 British Empire and Commonwealth Games in Cardiff, Wales, where he participated in one event; the 880 yards race.

After the Games he served with the Royal Air Force.
