= David Glasenbury =

British swimmer

Personal information
- Nationality: British (Welsh)
- Born: Q3.1936 Abertillery, Wales

Sport
- Sport: Swimming
- Event: Freestyle
- Club: Newport SC

David G. Glasenbury (born 1936) is a former Welsh swimmer who specialised in freestyle and competed at the Commonwealth Games.

== Biography ==
Glasenbury, born in Abertillery, Wales, was a member of the Newport Swimming Club but spent much of his time in London. In 1956, living in Plumstead, he won the London Area 110 yards freestyle title. He was also serving with the Royal Air Force at Halton in 1956.

In 1957 he retained the Woolwich Championships title and was a Woolwich swimming baths attendant. In 1958 he was a swimming baths attendant in Bermondsey, London and finished second behind Mike Edwards in the 220 yards freestyle at the Welsh 1958 A.S.A. Championships.

He represented the Welsh team at the 1958 British Empire and Commonwealth Games in Cardiff, Wales, where he helped Wales secure a fifth place finish in the final of the men's 220 yards freestyle relay relay, with Glyn Morgan and Mike Edwards.

In 2013, Glasenbury received an MBE for services to national police training. He had been and a physical education adviser at Bramshill College for 20 years.
