= Bronwen Jones =

Welsh athlete (born 1941)

Personal information
- Nationality: British (Welsh)
- Born: 1941 Bridgend, Wales

Sport
- Sport: Athletics
- Event: Sprints
- Club: Bridgend AC; Roath Harriers, Cardiff

Bronwen Francis Jones also known as Bonny Jones (born 1941) is a former track and field athlete from Wales, who competed at the 1958 British Empire and Commonwealth Games (now Commonwealth Games).

== Biography ==
Jones was educated at Bridgend Technical College and lived at 27 South Street in Bridgend. She was a member of the Bridgend Athletics Club and the Roath Harriers of Cardiff.

In June 1958 she represented South Wales against North Wales in a warm up event before the Empire Games, winning the 100 yards event. She finished runner-up behind Jean Whitehead at the 1958 AAA Welsh championships but won the long jump title.

She represented the 1958 Welsh team at the 1958 British Empire and Commonwealth Games in Cardiff, Wales, where she participated in three events; the 100 yards, the long jump and the 4 × 110 yards relay, with Jean Whitehead, Ellen Grainger and Gwyneth Lewis. In the relay the Welsh team were denied a place in the final after being disqualified after an illegal baton change.
