= Eugene Verebes =

British/Hungarian fencer

Personal information
- Nationality: Hungarian / British
- Born: 5 July 1910 Hungary

Sport
- Sport: Fencing
- Event: Sabre
- Club: London Fencing Club
Medal record
Fencing
Representing England
British Empire & Commonwealth Games
Gold medal – first place	1958 Cardiff	team sabre

Eugene Michael Verebes (5 July 1910 – date of death unknown) is a male former fencer who competed for Hungary, Great Britain and England.

== Biography ==
In 1952 Verebes was listed as the University champion of Hungary and in 1957 was chosen by Great Britain, becoming the first Hungarian born fencer to gain British international honours. At the time of selection he was 47 years old and had been out of international competition for 20 years.

He represented the England team and won a gold medal in the team sabre event at the 1958 British Empire and Commonwealth Games in Cardiff, Wales.

He was a Hungarian company director and became a British citizen in August 1956 shortly before the Hungarian Revolution of 1956. He married Helene Reimann in 1971.
