= Dick Ploog =

Australian cyclist (1936–2002)

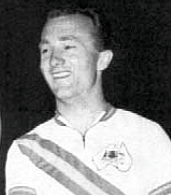
- Dick Ploog

Personal information
- Full name: Richard Francis Ploog
- Born: 27 November 1936 Ballarat, Victoria, Australia
- Died: 14 July 2002 (aged 65) Gold Coast, Queensland, Australia

Cycling career
- Sport: Cycling
Medal record
Men's cycling
Representing Australia
Olympic Games
Bronze medal – third place	1956 Melbourne	Sprint
British Empire (and Commonwealth) Games
Gold medal – first place	1954 Vancouver	Men's Time Trial
Gold medal – first place	1958 Cardiff	Men's Sprint

Richard Francis Ploog (27 November 1936 – 14 July 2002) was an Australian cyclist. He competed at the 1956 Summer Olympics, winning a bronze medal in the sprint event.
