= Ray Richards (cyclist) =

Welsh cyclist

Personal information
- Nationality: British (Welsh)
- Born: 11 June 1931 Cardiff, Wales
- Died: 30 June 2009 Cardiff, Wales

Sport
- Sport: Cycling
- Event(s): Track and Road
- Club: Cardiff Ajax CC

Raymond William Richards (11 June 1931 – 30 June 2009) was a racing cyclist from Wales, who represented Wales at the British Empire Games (now Commonwealth Games).

== Biography ==
Richards, born in Cardiff, Wales, was a member of the Cardiff Ajax Cycling Club.

In 1956, he won the 25 miles time trial Welsh National Championship (which was not restricted to Welsh riders) becoming the first Welshman to win the title. He defeated Gwyn Humphries in the 4,000 metres pursuit final at the Cardiff CCAA championships.

He represented the 1958 Welsh Team at the 1958 British Empire and Commonwealth Games in Cardiff, Wales, participating in one cycling program event; the individual pursuit
