= Wilf Bodman =

Welsh cyclist

Personal information
- Nationality: British (Welsh)
- Born: c.1933 Cardiff, Wales

Sport
- Sport: Cycling
- Event: Track
- Club: Cardiff Ajax CC

Wilfred Herbert Charles Bodman (born c.1933) is a former racing cyclist from Wales, who represented Wales at the British Empire Games (now Commonwealth Games).

== Biography ==
Bodman, born in Cardiff, Wales, was a member of the Cardiff Ajax Cycling Club and lived at Allensbank Crescent.

He represented the 1958 Welsh Team at the 1958 British Empire and Commonwealth Games in Cardiff, Wales, participating in one cycling program event; the scratch race where he was eliminated in the repechage.
