= Alban Stevens =

British swimmer

Personal information
- Nationality: British (Welsh)
- Born: Q1 1935 Newport, Wales
- Died: 4 March 2017 London, England

Sport
- Sport: Swimming
- Event: Backstroke
- Club: Royal Air Force; Maindee SC, Newport

Alban Jeffrey Stevens (1935 – 4 March 2017) was a Welsh swimmer who specialised in backstroke and competed at the Commonwealth Games.

== Biography ==
Stevens was a member of the Maindee Swimming Club of Newport and in 1949 as a 14-year-old, he was the Welsh backstroke champion. The following year he broke the junior 100 yards 14-year-old record by recording 70.2 sec. He continued his junior success by lowering the Welsh record again to 65.9 sec in September 1950.

Stevens was a two-time Welsh winner of prestigious Taff Swim held in Roath Park Lake in 1953 and 1955.

He also played water polo and swam medley events but missed out on a place at the 1954 British Empire and Commonwealth Games before he joined the Royal Air Force. In 1957, living at Morden Road, Newport, he was a corporal at Royal Air Force College Cranwell.

He represented the Welsh team at the 1958 British Empire and Commonwealth Games in Cardiff, Wales, where he competed in the 110 yards backstroke event.
