= Colin Fletcher (pole vaulter) =

Welsh athlete

Personal information
- Nationality: British (Welsh)
- Born: c.1935 Wales

Sport
- Sport: Athletics
- Event: Pole vault
- Club: Bridgend Athletics Club

Colin K. Fletcher (born c.1935) is a former track and field athlete from Wales, who competed at the 1958 British Empire and Commonwealth Games (now Commonwealth Games).

== Biography ==
Fletcher was a member of the Bridgend Athletics Club and in June 1958 he represented South Wales against North Wales in a warm up event before the Empire Games, finishing third in the pole vault event. He also finished runner-up behind John Neill in the pole vault event at the 1958 AAA Welsh championships.

He represented the 1958 Welsh team at the 1958 British Empire and Commonwealth Games in Cardiff, Wales, where he participated in one event; the pole vault event.

He held the Welsh pole vault title for five consecutive years from 1953 to 1957 and was a Welsh record holder with a jump of 12 feet 1 inch.
