= Fencing at the 1958 British Empire and Commonwealth Games =

- Venue: Cae'r Castell School
- Location: Rumney, Cardiff, Wales
- Dates: 18 to 26 July 1958

Fencing at the 1958 British Empire and Commonwealth Games was the third appearance of Fencing at the Commonwealth Games. The events took place at the Cae'r Castell School in Rumney, Cardiff, Wales.

England topped the fencing medal table with a clean sweep of gold medals in all seven events.

== Medal table ==
* Host nation (Wales)

Medals won by nation with totals, ranked by number of golds—sortable
Rank	Nation	Gold	Silver	Bronze	Total
1	England	7	2	4	13
2	Australia	0	4	1	5
3	Canada	0	1	0	1
4	Wales*	0	0	2	2
5	Hong Kong	0	0	0	0
5	New Zealand	0	0	0	0
5	Northern Ireland	0	0	0	0
5	Scotland	0	0	0	0
5	South Africa	0	0	0	0
Totals (9 entries)		7	7	7	21

== Medal winners ==
Event	Gold	Silver	Bronze
Foil (men)	Raymond Paul (ENG)	Ivan Lund (AUS)	René Paul (ENG)
Foil - Team	England (ENG); Raymond Paul; René Paul; Harold Cooke	Australia (AUS); Brian McCowage; Michael Sichel; Ivan Lund	Wales (WAL); Malcolm Kerslake; John Evans; John Preston
Épée	Bill Hoskyns (ENG)	Mike Howard (ENG)	Allan Jay (ENG)
Épée - Team	England (ENG); Bill Hoskyns; Allan Jay; Mike Howard	Canada (CAN); Carl Schwende; John Andru; Roland Asselin	Australia (AUS); David Francis Doyle; Ivan Lund; John Simpson
Sabre	Bill Hoskyns (ENG)	Ralph Cooperman (ENG)	Mike Amberg (ENG)
Sabre - Team	England (ENG); Mike Amberg; Ralph Cooperman; Bill Hoskyns; Eugene Verebes	Australia (AUS); Alexander Martonffy; Ivan Lund; Michael Sichel	Wales (WAL); John Preston; Malcolm Kerslake; Roger Maunder; Ted Lucas
Foil (women)	Gillian Sheen (ENG)	Barbara McCreath (AUS)	Mary Glen-Haig (ENG)

== Results ==
=== Foil (men) ===
- Final pool

Pos	Athlete	Wins/hits against
1	(England) Raymond Paul	7 wins
2	(Australia) Ivan Lund	6 wins
3	(England) René Paul	4 wins
4	(New Zealand) Brian Pickworth	4 wins
5	(Canada) Carl Schwende	3 wins
6	(Australia) Brian McCowage	3 wins
7	(Wales) John Preston	1 wins
8	(Hong Kong) Hak Yau Hung	0 wins

=== Foil (women) ===
- Final pool

Pos	Athlete	Wins/hits against
1	(England) Gillian Sheen	6 wins
2	(Australia) Barbara May McCreath	5 wins
3	(England) Mary Glen-Haig	5 wins
4	(New Zealand) Enid McElwee	4 wins
5	(South Africa) Andree Sacco	3 wins
6	(Australia) Denise A. O'Brien	3 wins
7	(New Zealand) Elizabeth Mitchell	2 wins
8	(Canada) Marjorie Maries	0 wins

=== Épée (men) ===
- Final pool

Pos	Athlete	Wins, hits against
1	(England) Bill Hoskyns	6 wins, barrage
2	(England) Mike Howard	6 wins
3	(England) Allan Jay	5 wins, 25
4	(Australia) Ivan Lund	5 wins, 26
5	(Canada) Carl Schwende	3 wins
6	(Australia) John Simpson	1 win
7	(Wales) Roger Maunder	1 win
8	(New Zealand) Bob Binning	1 win

=== Sabre (men) ===
- Final pool

Pos	Athlete	Wins
1	(England) Bill Hoskyns	6 wins
2	(England) Ralph Cooperman	5 wins
3	(England) Mike Amberg	5 wins
4	(Australia) Michael Sichel	4 wins
5	(New Zealand) Bob Binning	3 wins
6	(Northern Ireland) Bob Thompson	3 wins
7	(Australia) Ivan Lund	1 win
8	(Scotland) Sandy Leckie	1 win

=== Foil (team) ===
First Round, Pool A

Team 1	Team 2	Score
Wales	Scotland	6–3
Australia	Hong Kong	9–0
Wales	Hong Kong	7–2
Australia	Scotland	5–2
Australia	Wales	8–1

First Round, Pool B

Team 1	Team 2	Score
New Zealand	Canada	7–2
England	Canada	5–1
England	New Zealand	7–2

Final Pool

Team 1	Team 2	Score
England	Wales	7–2
Australia	New Zealand	7–2
Wales	New Zealand	5–2
England	Australia	5–0

=== Épée (team) ===
First Round, Pool A

Team 1	Team 2	Score
New Zealand	Wales	7–2
England	Wales	5–0

First Round, Pool B

Team 1	Team 2	Score
Canada	Scotland	8–1
Australia	Hong Kong	6–3
Canada	Hong Kong	7–0
Australia	Scotland	6–3

Final Pool

Team 1	Team 2	Score
Canada	Australia	5–4
England	New Zealand	8–1
Canada	New Zealand	6–0
England	Australia	5–2
England	Canada	5–0
Australia	New Zealand	5–1

=== Sabre (team) ===
First Round, Pool A

Team 1	Team 2	Score
England	Hong Kong	9–0
Wales	New Zealand	6–3
England	New Zealand	5–1
Wales	Hong Kong	5–4

First Round, Pool B

Team 1	Team 2	Score
Scotland	Australia	5–4
Australia	Canada	5–4
Canada	Scotland	6–1

Final Pool

Team 1	Team 2	Score
England	Canada	8–1
Australia	Wales	5–4
England	Wales	8–1
England	Australia	5–4
Wales	Canada	6–3

== See also ==
- List of Commonwealth Games medallists in fencing
