= Caird Park Velodrome =

Sports venue in Dundee, Scotland

- Mark Stewart Velodrome
- Interactive map of Caird Park Velodrome
- Location: Dundee, Scotland, United Kingdom
- Coordinates: 56.4833°N 2.9548°W
- Surface: Asphalt
- Field size: 402.25 m (439.91 yd) track

The Caird Park Velodrome is an outdoor 402.25-metre (1,319.7 ft) concrete velodrome in Dundee, Scotland. Adjacent to the velodrome is an athletics stadium with a 400-metre (1,300 ft) running track, 18- and 9-hole golf courses, several football pitches and a rugby pitch, whilst in the centre of the velodrome is a football pitch, as it is one of two major outdoor sport complexes in the city.

In 2012 Sport Scotland spent £300,000 on redevelopment of the velodrome.

The velodrome is home to the Discovery Juniors Cycling Club, which Scottish gold medal cyclist Mark Stewart was a member of. Since his gold medal win at the 2018 Commonwealth Games in the Gold Coast, Australia, there have been calls for the velodrome to be renamed after him.

The Velodrome received a further renovation - with the track centre being filled with asphalt as part of a wider development of the Regional Performance Centre at Caird Park - with the velodrome renamed to the Mark Stewart Velodrome in 2019.

Had Scotland and Ireland's UEFA Euro 2008 bid been successful, a new stadium would have been built in Caird Park.

== See also ==
- List of cycling tracks and velodromes
