= Warren Johnston =

New Zealand cyclist (born 1935)

Personal information
- Full name: Warren Johnston
- Born: 23 December 1935 (age 90) Ngāruawāhia, New Zealand

Cycling career
- Sport: Cycling
- Discipline: Track
- Role: Rider
- Rider type: Endurance
Medal record
Men's track cycling
Representing New Zealand
Commonwealth Games
Silver medal – second place	1958 Cardiff	10 Mile Scratch Race
Silver medal – second place	1962 Perth	10 Mile Scratch Race

Warren Thomas Johnston (born 23 December 1935) is a former racing cyclist from New Zealand.

He won the silver medal in the men's 10-mile (16 km) scratch race at both the 1958 and 1962 British Empire and Commonwealth Games. He also competed in the men's sprint placing 4th at both Games.

His only Olympic appearance was at the 1956 Summer Olympic Games where he competed in the men's sprint and the tandem event.
