= John Fage (rower) =

British rower (born 1935)

Personal information
- Nationality: British (English/Welsh)
- Born: 1935 (age 90–91) Wirral, Cheshire, England
- Education: St Edmund Hall, Oxford

Sport
- Sport: Rowing
Medal record
The Boat Race
Gold medal – first place	The Boat Race 1959	Oxford
Silver medal – second place	The Boat Race 1958	Oxford
Representing Wales
Commonwealth Games
Bronze medal – third place	Cardiff 1958	men's coxless four

John Lawton Fage (born 1935) is a former rower, who won a bronze medal at the Commonwealth Games.

== Biography ==
Fage attended Wrekin College and studied at St Edmund Hall, Oxford. and competed in the 1958 and 1959 Boat Races for Oxford, and was a member of the winners' team in the latter.

In 1958, his family home was Ty Newydd Hotel in Aberdaron and he was selected for the 1958 Welsh team for the 1958 British Empire and Commonwealth Games in Cardiff, Wales, where he competed in the coxless fours and won the bronze medal.
