= Hylton Mitchell =

Trinidadian cyclist

Personal information
- Born: 12 September 1926 Claxton Bay, Trinidad and Tobago
- Died: 7 February 2014 (aged 87) Claxton Bay, Trinidad and Tobago

Cycling career
- Sport: Cycling

Hylton Mitchell (12 September 1926 – 7 February 2014) was a Trinidadian cyclist. He competed in the three events at the 1956 Summer Olympics.
