= Fred Markus =

Canadian cyclist (1937–2022)

Personal information
- Full name: Alfred Henry Markus
- Born: 26 June 1937 Toronto, Ontario, Canada
- Died: 30 March 2022 (aged 84) Maitland, New South Wales, Australia

Cycling career
- Sport: Cycling

Alfred Henry Markus (26 June 1937 – 30 March 2022) was a Canadian cyclist. He competed in three events at the 1956 Summer Olympics.
