= Norman Horrell =

Welsh athlete (1934–2001)

Personal information
- Nationality: British (Welsh)
- Born: 25 December 1934 Pontypridd, Wales
- Died: 2 December 2001 (aged 66) Abergavenny, Wales

Sport
- Sport: Athletics
- Event: Middle-distance / cross-country
- Club: Rhondda Valley Athletics Club

Arthur Norman Horrell (25 December 1934 – 2 December 2001) was a track and field athlete from Wales, who competed at the 1958 British Empire and Commonwealth Games (now Commonwealth Games).

== Biography ==
Horrell was a member of the Rhondda Valley Athletics Club and was the 1957 cross-country champion of Wales.

In June 1958 he represented South Wales against North Wales in a warm up event before the Empire Games, winning the one mile event. He won the 880 yards at the 1958 AAA Welsh championships and recorded 1min 55sec for the 880 yards, which brought him to the attention of the Welsh selectors.

He represented the 1958 Welsh team at the 1958 British Empire and Commonwealth Games in Cardiff, Wales, where he participated in one event; the 880 yards race.

At the time of the Games, he was a boiler maker in Ferndale.
