= Cycling at the 1958 British Empire and Commonwealth Games – Men's road race =

Cycling Road – Men's road race at the 1958 British Empire and Commonwealth Games
- Venue: Ogmore-by-Sea, Wales
- Dates: July 1958
- Competitors: 40 from 13 nations

Medalists
gold medal	Ray Booty	England
silver medal	Frank Brazier	Australia
bronze medal	Stuart Slack	Isle of Man

The men's road race at the 1958 British Empire and Commonwealth Games, was part of the cycling programme, which took place in July 1958.

== Results ==
Rank	Rider	Time
1st place, gold medalist(s)	Ray Booty (ENG)	5:16.33:7
2nd place, silver medalist(s)	Frank Brazier (AUS)	5:19.21:7
3rd place, bronze medalist(s)	Stuart Slack (IOM)	5:19:21:7
4	John Geddes (ENG)	5:19.21:7
5	Terrence Flanagan (AUS)	5:19.21:7
6	J.A. Higham (CAN)	5:19.21:7
7	Ronnie Park (SCO)	5:19.25:7
8	Danny Morgan (WAL)	5:19.26:7
9	Jimmy Williams (SCO)	5:19.28:7
10	Bill Bradley (ENG)	5:20:12:7
11	Lance Payne (NZL)	5:23:21:7
12	Sam Kerr (NIR)	5:25:25:7
13	Patrick Murphy (CAN)	5:25:28:7
14	Jim Maguire (NIR)	5:25:28:7
15	Ken Laidlaw (SCO)	5:27:49:7
16	R. D. McKinnell (CAN)	5:27:53:7
17	Ron Roach (WAL)	5:32:25.7
18	Eamon Burns (NIR)	5:35:38:7
19	M. Gagne (CAN)	
-	Colin Wilkinson (AUS)	-
-	Keith Manny (AUS)	-
-	A. Brace (CEY)	-
-	William Holmes (ENG)	-
-	Vic Holland (IOM)	-
-	Ron Killey (IOM)	-
-	Reg Quayle (IOM)	-
-	Bernard Hubert (JER)	-
-	B. Porter (KEN)	-
-	C. Ash (KEN)	-
-	Keith Gant (NZL)	-
-	John Peoples (NZL)	-
-	Dick Johnstone (NZL)	-
-	Séamus Herron (NIR)	-
-	Muhammad Shah Rukh (PAK)	-
-	Ernie Scally (SCO)	-
-	Clyde Rimple (TTO)	-
-	Hylton Mitchell (TTO)	-
-	U. F. Lewis (TTO)	-
-	Chris Hughes (WAL)	-
-	Norman Hooper (WAL)	-
