= Weightlifting at the 1958 British Empire and Commonwealth Games =

- Venue: Memorial Hall
- Location: Barry, Wales
- Dates: 18 to 26 July 1958

Weightlifting at the 1958 British Empire and Commonwealth Games was the third appearance of Weightlifting at the Commonwealth Games. The events took place in the Memorial Hall in Barry, Wales and featured contests in seven weight classes.

Singapore topped the weightlifting medal table with two gold medals.

== Medal table ==
* Host nation (Wales)

Medals won by nation with totals, ranked by number of golds—sortable
Rank	Nation	Gold	Silver	Bronze	Total
1	Singapore	2	0	0	2
2	England	1	1	1	3
2	South Africa	1	1	1	3
4	Barbados	1	1	0	2
5	Australia	1	0	2	3
6	Scotland	1	0	0	1
7	Malaya	0	2	0	2
8	Canada	0	1	2	3
9	British Guiana	0	1	0	1
10	Trinidad and Tobago	0	0	1	1
11	Dominica	0	0	0	0
11	Jamaica	0	0	0	0
11	Jersey	0	0	0	0
11	New Zealand	0	0	0	0
11	Northern Ireland	0	0	0	0
11	Southern Rhodesia	0	0	0	0
11	Wales*	0	0	0	0
Totals (17 entries)		7	7	7	21

== Medal winners ==
Event	Gold	Silver	Bronze
Bantamweight	Reginald Gaffley; South Africa	Ronald Brownbill; England	Marcel Gosselin; Canada
Featherweight	Tan Ser Cher; Singapore	Chung Kum Weng; Malaya	Rodney Wilkes; Trinidad and Tobago
Lightweight	Tan Howe Liang; Singapore	Harry Webber; South Africa	Ben Helfgott; England
Middleweight	Blair Blenman; Barbados	Winston McArthur; British Guiana	Adrian Gilbert; Canada
Light Heavyweight	Phil Caira; Scotland	Sylvanus Blackman; Barbados	Jack Kestell; South Africa
Middle Heavyweight	Manny Santos; Australia	Tan Kim Bee; Malaya	Leonard Treganowan; Australia
Heavyweight	Ken McDonald; England	Dave Baillie; Canada	Arthur Shannos; Australia

== Results ==
=== Bantamweight 56kg ===
Pos	Athlete	Weight
1	Reginald Gaffley (SAF)	660 lb
2	Ronald Brownbill (ENG)	630 lb
3	Marcel Gosselin (CAN)	605 lb
4	M. Swain (BGU)	605 lb
5	Sammy Dalzell (NIR)	585 lb
6	John Cannon (SCO)	580 lb
7	Myrddin John (WAL)	565 lb

=== Featherweight 60kg ===
Pos	Athlete	Weight
1	Tan Ser Cher (SIN)	685 lb
2	Chung Kum Weng (MAL)	675 lb
3	Rodney Wilkes (TRI)	670 lb
4	Harold Norville (BAR)	655 lb
5	Allan Robinson (ENG)	635 lb
6	M. Smith (BGU)	605 lb
7	James S. Moir (SCO)	605 lb
8	John Heywood (WAL)	600 lb
9	W. Goldsmith (JAM)	ret

=== Lightweight 67.5kg ===
Pos	Athlete	Weight
1	Tan Howe Liang (SIN)	790 lb
2	Harry Webber (SAF)	750 lb
3	Ben Helfgott (ENG)	750 lb
4	Jules Sylvain (CAN)	735 lb
5	C. M. Goring (BGU)	725 lb
6	C. Evelyn (TTO)	715 lb
7	G. A. Nigel da Silva (DMA)	705 lb
8	Ron Jenkins (WAL)	690 lb
9	Peter Ridgley (NZL)	685 lb
10	Donald Bayley (AUS)	685 lb
11	Billy Orbin (SCO)	635 lb
12	Cliff Heuze (JEY)	625 lb
13	Terry Pelan (NIR)	615 lb

=== Middleweight 75kg ===
Pos	Athlete	Weight
1	Blair Blenman (BAR)	795 lb
2	Winston McArthur (BGU)	795 lb
3	Adrian Gilbert (CAN)	785 lb
4	Hennie Van Staden (RSA)	770 lb
5	Lionel de Freitas (TTO)	765 lb
6	Laurie Levine (ENG)	760 lb
7	Daryl Cohen (AUS)	720 lb
8	Billy Cooke (NIR)	710 lb
9	Yorrie Evans (WAL)	700 lb
10	Gordon Newman (WAL)	700 lb
11	John Wright (SCO)	675 lb

=== Light Heavyweight 82.5kg ===
Pos	Athlete	Weight
1	Phil Caira (SCO)	875 lb
2	Sylvanus Blackman (BAR)	850 lb
3	Jack Kestell (SAF)	850 lb
4	J. Samuel (TTO)	815 lb
5	Gerry Gratton (CAN)	815 lb
6	Mike Lipari (CAN)	805 lb
7	George Manners (ENG)	800 lb
8	Francis Thomas Hall (AUS)	785 lb
9	A. Asaro (SRH)	785 lb
10	Hohepa Komene (NZL)	770 lb
11	A. Baker (BGU)	750 lb
12	R. McFarlane (JEY)	720 lb

=== Middle Heavyweight 90kg ===
Pos	Athlete	Weight
1	Manny Santos (AUS)	890 lb
2	Tan Kim Bee (MAL)	865 lb
3	Leonard Treganowan (AUS)	835 lb
4	R Gore (ENG)	815 lb
5	Alwyn Evans (WAL)	810 lb
6	Melville Barnett (WAL)	805 lb
7	Keevil Daly (CAN)	530 lb
8	Mink De Paiva (SAF)	520 lb
9	Louis Martin (JAM)	x

=== Heavyweight 110kg ===
Pos	Athlete	Weight
1	Ken McDonald (ENG)	1005 lb
2	Dave Baillie (CAN)	985 lb
3	Arthur Shannos (AUS)	870 lb
4	Louis F. Greeff (SAF)	860 lb

== See also ==
- List of Commonwealth Games medallists in weightlifting
