= Cycling at the 1958 British Empire and Commonwealth Games – Men's individual pursuit =

Cycling Track – Men's individual pursuit at the 1958 British Empire and Commonwealth Games
- Venue: Maindy Stadium
- Dates: July 1958
- Competitors: 19 from 10 nations

Medalists
gold medal	Norman Sheil	England
silver medal	Tom Simpson	England
bronze medal	Warwick Dalton	New Zealand

The men's individual pursuit at the 1958 British Empire and Commonwealth Games, was part of the cycling programme, which took place in July 1958.

== Results ==
Rank	Rider	Time
1st place, gold medalist(s)	Norman Sheil (ENG)	5:10.2
2nd place, silver medalist(s)	Tom Simpson (ENG)	5:10.5
3rd place, bronze medalist(s)	Warwick Dalton (NZL)	5:14.7
4	Mike Gambrill (ENG)	5:19.6
5	Charles Jonker (RSA)	5:10.5
6	Dave Evans (WAL)	5:12.6
7	Warren Scarfe (AUS)	5:17:4
8	Patrick Murphy (CAN)	5:25.1
9	Frank Brazier (AUS)	5:26.6
10	Tommy Talbot (NIR)	5:27.8
11	Eddie Brown (SCO)	5:28.0
12	Paul Enock (CAN)	5:28.8
13	Gwyn Humphries (WAL)	5:29.0
14	Terrence Flanagan (AUS)	5:29.0
15	Hislop Dickson (SCO)	5:33.8
16	Ray Richards (WAL)	5:42.3
17	S. Perchard (JER)	5:44.2
18	Muhammad Shah Rukh (PAK)	6:11.6
19	B. Porter (KEN)	6:20.3
