= Boxing at the 1958 British Empire and Commonwealth Games =

- Venue: Sophia Gardens Pavilion
- Location: Cardiff, Wales
- Dates: 18 to 26 July 1958

Boxing at the 1958 British Empire and Commonwealth Games was the sixth appearance of the Boxing at the Commonwealth Games. The events were held in Cardiff, Wales, and featured contests in ten weight classes.

The boxing events were held in the Sophia Gardens Pavilion. South Africa topped the boxing medal table by virtue of winning four gold medals.

== Medal table ==
* Host nation (Wales)

Medals won by nation with totals, ranked by number of golds—sortable
Rank	Nation	Gold	Silver	Bronze	Total
1	South Africa	4	1	2	7
2	Scotland	2	1	3	6
3	Australia	2	1	0	3
4	Wales*	1	2	3	6
5	Northern Ireland	1	1	3	5
6	England	0	3	4	7
7	Uganda	0	1	0	1
8	Canada	0	0	3	3
9	New Zealand	0	0	1	1
9	Nigeria	0	0	1	1
11	British Guiana	0	0	0	0
11	Ceylon	0	0	0	0
11	Ghana	0	0	0	0
11	India	0	0	0	0
11	Isle of Man	0	0	0	0
11	Jamaica	0	0	0	0
11	Jersey	0	0	0	0
11	Northern Rhodesia	0	0	0	0
11	Southern Rhodesia	0	0	0	0
Totals (19 entries)		10	10	20	40

== Medallists ==
Weight	Gold	Silver	Bronze
Flyweight	Jackie Brown (SCO)	Tommy Bache (ENG)	Peter Lavery (NIR), Donald Braithwaite (WAL)
Bantamweight	Howard Winstone (WAL)	Oliver Taylor (AUS)	Freddie Owen (SCO), Dickie Hanna (NIR)
Featherweight	Wally Taylor (AUS)	Malcom Collins (WAL)	Gert Coetzee (SAF), John McClory (NIR)
Lightweight	Dick McTaggart (SCO)	Jim Jordan (NIR)	Johnny Cooke (ENG), Paddy Donovan (NZL)
Light Welterweight	Henry Loubscher (SAF)	Bobby Kane (SCO)	Joey Jacobs (ENG), Raymond Galante (CAN)
Welterweight	Joseph Greyling (SAF)	Thomas Kawere (UGA)	Bertie Scott (SCO), Brian Nancurvis (ENG)
Light Middleweight	Grant Webster (SAF)	Stuart Pearson (ENG)	James Arthur Walters (CAN), Bill Brown (WAL)
Middleweight	Terry Milligan (NIR)	Philippus du Plessis (SAF)	Robert Piau (CAN), Johnny Caiger (ENG)
Light Heavyweight	Tony Madigan (AUS)	Ossie Higgins (WAL)	Willie Bannon (SCO), Gerhardus Jacobus De Bruyn (SAF)
Heavyweight	Daniel Bekker (SAF)	David Thomas (ENG)	Roger Pleace (WAL), Gbadegesin Salawu (NGR)

== Results ==
There was no Welsh fighter in the light-welterweight category after Bobby Bown failed to secure leave from work and his replacement Cedric Williams was subsequently unfit to start. Some weight classes required both a first round and quarter-finals stage before the medal fights took place.

=== First round and quarter-finals ===
Weight	Winner	Loser	Score
Flyweight 51 kg
	(Canada) Walter Henry	(Australia) Lester J. Shaether	stopped 2nd
	(Scotland) Jackie Brown	(South Africa) A. Du Mont	points
	(England) Tommy Bache	(Canada) Walter Henry	KO 1st
	(Northern Ireland) Peter Lavery	(Nigeria) Orizu Obilaso	points
	(Wales) Donald Braithwaite	(Southern Rhodesia) William. A. Pretorius	points
Bantamweight 54 kg
	(Canada) Kai Yip	(Ghana) John Allen	points
	(Australia) Oliver Taylor	(Nigeria) S. O. Laguda	points
	(Wales) Howard Winstone	(England) Peter Benneyworth	points
	(Australia) Oliver Taylor	(Canada) Kai Yip	points
	(Scotland) Freddie Owen	(South Africa) J. L. van Biljon	points
	(Northern Ireland) Dickie Hanna	(Northern Rhodesia) Abe Bekker	stopped 2nd
Featherweight 57 kg
	(Australia) Walter Robert Taylor	(Ghana) F. Quartey	points
	(England) Roy Beaman	(Canada) Robert W. McEwan	points
	(Southern Rhodesia) J. J. Bekker	(Nigeria) I. A. Jones	stopped 1st
	(Wales) Malcolm Collins	(New Zealand) Maurice Purton	points
	(South Africa) Gert Johannes Coetzee	(Scotland) George Drummond	points
	(Northern Ireland) John McClory	(Southern Rhodesia) J. J. Bekker	points
	(Australia) Walter Robert Taylor	(England) Roy Beaman	points
Lightweight 60 kg
	(Scotland) Dick McTaggart	(Australia) John Seymour Leckie	stopped 3rd
	(Northern Ireland) Jim Jordan	(Wales) Bernard Robson	points
	(England) Johnny Cooke	(India) Sunder Rao	points
	(New Zealand) Paddy Donovan	(South Africa) C. Sam	points
Light-welterweight 63.5 kg
	(England) Joey Jacobs	(Uganda) I. K. Obita	KO 3rd
	(Scotland) Bobby Kane	(Dominion of Ceylon) Chandrasena Jayasuriya	points
	(Southern Rhodesia) G. R. Smith	(New Zealand) Graham Finlay	points
	(South Africa) Henry Loubscher	(British Guiana) V. Fernandes	points
	(Scotland) Bobby Kane	(Southern Rhodesia) G. R. Smith	points
	(England) Joey Jacobs	(Ghana) Clement Quartey	points
	(Canada) Raymond Galante	(Jersey) George Turmel	points
Welterweight 67 kg
	(South Africa) Joseph Greyling	(Wales) Billy Phillips	points
	(Uganda) Thomas Kawere	(Nigeria) M. Uzubu	stopped 3rd
	(Scotland) Bertie Scott	(Ghana) Joseph Larty	points
	(England) Brian Nancurvis	(Australia) William John Fitzpatrick	points
Light-middleweight 71 kg
	(Scotland) Tommy McGuiness	(Jersey) Dick Turpin	stopped 3rd
	(England) Stuart Pearson	(Isle of Man) Jackie B. Osborne	points
	(Australia) Kevin Hogarth	(Uganda) Frank Nyangweso	points
	(Wales) Bill Brown	(Ghana) Alhassan Brimah	stopped 1st
	(South Africa) Grant Webster	(Jamaica) L. Samuels	sopped 1st
	(England) Stuart Pearson	(Australia) Kevin Hogarth	points
	(Canada) James Arthur Walters	(Nigeria) C. Afodu	stopped 2nd
	(Wales) Bill Brown	(Scotland) Tommy McGuiness	stopped 3rd
Middleweight 75 kg
	(Northern Ireland) Terry Milligan	(New Zealand) Bevin R. Weir	disq 2nd
	(India) Hari Singh	(Wales) Glyn Waters	KO 2nd
	(Northern Ireland) Terry Milligan	(India) Hari Singh	w/o
	(South Africa) Phillipus Lodewyk du Plessis	(Ghana) S. Osei	points
	(Canada) Robert Piau	(Scotland) Alistair McKenzie	stopped 2nd
	(England) Johnny Caiger	(Uganda) Peter Odhiambo	points
Light heavyweight 81 kg
	(Australia) Tony Madigan	(New Zealand) Edward Morrison	points
	(Wales) Ossie Higgins	(Canada) Frank E. Noneley	stopped 3rd
	(Scotland) Willie Bannon	(England) Joe Leeming	stopped 2nd
	(South Africa) Gerhardus Jacobus De Bruyn	bye	
Heavyweight 91 kg
	(South Africa) Daniel Bekker	(Canada) Stan P. Renaud	stopped 1st
	(England) David Thomas	(Uganda) Leslie Osman Peach	points
	(Wales) Roger Pleace	(Scotland) Angus Thomson	points
	(Nigeria) Gbadegesin Salawu	bye	

=== Semi-finals ===
Weight	Winner	Loser	Score
Flyweight
	Brown	Braithwaite	points
	Bache	Lavery	points
Bantamweight
	Winstone	Hanna	points
	O. Taylor	Owen	points
Featherweight
	W. Taylor	McClory	points
	Collins	Coetzee	points
Lightweight
	McTaggart	Donovan	points
	Jordan	Cooke	points
Light-welterweight
	Loubscher	Galante	stopped 2nd
	Kane	Jacobs	points
Welterweight
	Greyling	Nancurvis	points
	Kawere	Scott	points
Light-middleweight
	Webster	Walters	points
	Pearson	Brown	points
Middleweight
	Milligan	Caiger	points
	du Plessis	Piau	points
Light heavyweight
	Madigan	de Bruyn	points
	Higgins	Bannon	points
Heavyweight
	Bekker	Salawu	stopped 2nd
	Thomas	Pleace	disq 3rd

=== Finals ===
Weight	Winner	Loser	Score
Flyweight	Brown	Bache	points
Bantamweight	Winstone	O. Taylor	points
Featherweight	W. Taylor	Collins	points
Lightweight	McTaggart	Jordan	points
Light-welterweight	Loubscher	Kane	points
Welterweight	Greyling	Kawere	points
Light-middleweight	Webster	Pearson	points
Middleweight	Milligan	du Plessis	points
Light heavyweight	Madigan	Higgins	points
Heavyweight	Bekker	Thomas	points
