= Freddie Owen =

Freddie Owen may refer to:

- Freddie Owen (cricketer) (born 1985), English first-class cricketer
- Freddie Owen (boxer) (fl. 1950s), English boxer

== See also ==
- Frederick Owen (1800–1895), Irish Anglican priest
- Freddie Owens (born 1981), American men's basketball coach
- Freddie Eugene Owens (1978–2024), American executed murderer
