= Eddie Brown (cyclist) =

Scottish cyclist

Personal information
- Nationality: British (Scotland)

Sport
- Sport: Cycling
- Event: Track
- Club: Stirlingshire RC

Eddie Brown is a former racing cyclist from Scotland, who represented Scotland at the British Empire Games (now Commonwealth Games).

== Biography ==
Brown was a member of the Stirlingshire Roads Club and won the 1958 Auchtederran Wheelers 25 mile time trial. He finished runner-up to Hislop Dickson in the 1958 Scottish championship 4,000 metres pursuit final.

He represented the 1958 Scottish Team at the 1958 British Empire and Commonwealth Games in Cardiff, Wales, participating in one cycling program event; the individual pursuit.

He was the Scottish pursuit champion in 1959.
