= England Boxing National Amateur Championships Light-Welterweight Champions =

English Boxing competition

England Boxing National Amateur Championships Light-Welterweight Champions (U62.5kg)
- Status: active
- Genre: Boxing
- Inaugurated: 1951
- Organiser: England Boxing

The England Boxing National Amateur Championships Light-Welterweight Championship formerly known as the ABA Championships is the primary English amateur boxing championship. It had previously been contested by all the nations of the United Kingdom.

== History ==
The light-welterweight division was inaugurated in 1951 is currently contested in the Under 62.5 kg weight category. The championships are highly regarded in the boxing world and seen as the most prestigious national amateur championships.

== Past winners ==
Year	Winner	Club
1951	Bill Connor	Lowe House ABC
1952	Peter Waterman	Caius ABC
1953	David Hughes	Cardiff Gas BC
1954	Sgmn. George Martin	Army
1955	Frank McQuillan	Dundee BC
1956	Dave Stone	Battersea ABC
1957	Dave Stone	Army
1958	Bobby Kane	St. Mungos ABC
1959	Bobby Kane	St. Mungos ABC
1960	Bobby Day	Lancaster Lads Club
1961	Cpl. Brian Brazier	Army
1962	L/Cpl. Brian Brazier	Army
1963	Dick McTaggart	Kelvin ABC
1964	Robert Taylor	Mitchell & Butlers ABC
1965	Dick McTaggart	Kelvin ABC
1966	Billy Hiatt	Battersea ABC
1967	Brian Hudspeth	Garden City ABC
1968	Eamonn Cole	Fitzroy Lodge ABC
1969	John H. Stracey	Repton ABC
1970	Dai Davies	Bangor YMCA ABC
1971	Michael Kingwell	Robert Browning ABC
1972	Terry Waller	Lynn ABC
1973	Neville Cole	Fitzroy Lodge ABC
1974	Peter Kelly	Royal Navy
1975	Joseph Zeraschi	Fitzroy Lodge ABC
1976	Clinton McKenzie	Sir Philip Game ABC
1977	Jim Douglas	Camperdown ABC
1978	Dave Williams	Brookside ABC
1979	Eddie Copeland	Cavendish ABC
1980	Tony Willis	Rotunda ABC
1981	Tony Willis	Rotunda ABC
1982	Tony Adams	Fitzroy Lodge ABC
1983	Dave Dent	St. Pancras ABC
1984	Dave Griffiths	Splott Adventure ABC
1985	Ibby Mustara	Lynn ABC
1986	Jonathan Alsop	Cardiff YMCA ABC
1987	Andy Holligan	Rotunda ABC
1988	Allan Hall	Darlington ABC
1989	Allan Hall	Shildon BR ABC
1990	James Pender	St. Francis ABC
1991	Jason Matthews	Aberbargoed BC
1992	Darren McCarrick	Boarshaw ABC
1993	Peter Richardson	Philip Thomas School of Boxing ABC
1994	Alan Temple	Hartlepool Boys Welfare ABC
1995	Alan Vaughan	Huyton ABC
1996	Carl Wall	Gemini ABC
1997	Ricky Hatton	Sale West ABC
1998	Nigel Wright	Shildon ABC
1999	Daniel Happe	Repton ABC
2000	Nigel Wright	Shildon ABC
2001	Gavin Smith	Karmand ABC
2002	Lenny Daws	Rosehill ABC
2003	Lee Beavis	Dale Youth ABC
2004	John Watson	Higherside ABC
2005	Michael Grant	Haringey ABC
2006	Jamie Cox	Walcot ABC
2007	Bradley Saunders	South Durham ABC
2008	Liam Smith	Rotunda ABC
2009	Ronnie Heffron	Boarshaw ABC
2010	Joe Hughes	Malmsbury
2011	Danny Phillips	South Bank ABC
2012	Louis Adolphe	Earlsfield ABC
2013	Josh Kelly	Houghton & District ABC
2014	Sam Maxwell	Salisbury ABC
2015	Pat McCormack	Birtley ABC
2016	Danny Wright	Centurions ABC
2017	Thomas Hodgson	Birtley ABC
2018	Dalton Smith	Steel City ABC
2019	Sam Noakes	Westree ABC
2020	cancelled due to COVID 19.	
2021	Ibraheem Sulaimaan	Eastside
2022	Louie O'Doherty	Halstead & Essex Uni
2023	Giorgio Visioli	Repton
2024	Oliver Jones	Croxteth
2025	Amo Singh	Repton
2026	Joe Turner	Jennings
