= Richard Hanna =

Richard Hanna may refer to:

- Richard H. Hanna (1879–1946), justice of the New Mexico Supreme Court
- Richard T. Hanna (1914–2001), U.S. Representative from California
- Richard Hanna (New York politician) (1951–2020), U.S. Representative from New York
- Dickie Hanna (boxer) (born 1939), Northern Irish boxer
