= Ronald Jones =

Ronald or Ronnie Jones may refer to:

- Ronald W. Jones (1931–2022), American professor of economics
- Ronald Jones (musician) (born 1970), American musician; guitarist with The Flaming Lips
- Ronald Jones (interdisciplinarian) (1952–2019), American artist, critic and educator
- Ronald Jones (cricketer) (1938–2019), English cricketer
- Ronald Jones (defensive lineman) (born 1981), American former football player
- Ronald Jones II (born 1997), American football running back
- Popeye Jones (Ronald Jones, born 1970), basketball player
- Ronnie Jones (American football) (born 1955), American football coach
- Ronnie Jones (singer) (born 1937), American soul singer
- Ronnie Jones (politician) (born 1953), American politician in West Virginia
- Ronnie Jones (bowls) (1931–2022), Canadian lawn and indoor bowler
- Ronnie Jones (swimmer) (c. 1940–2025), Northern Irish swimmer

== See also ==
- Ron Jones (disambiguation)
