= Angus Thomson (boxer) =

Scottish boxer

Personal information
- Nationality: British (Scottish)
- Born: 21 July 1936 Edinburgh, Scotland
- Died: 28 November 1975 (aged 39) Corstorphine, Edinburgh, Scotland

Sport
- Sport: Boxing
- Event: Heavyyweight
- Club: Leith Victoria AAC

Angus Thomson (21 July 1936 – 28 November 1975) was a Scottish boxer who competed at the Commonwealth Games.

== Biography ==
Thomson was a member of the Leith Victoria Amateur Athletic Club and in 1957 was the Eastern District light-heavyweight champion. He represented Scotland at international level.

He was selected for the 1958 Scottish team for the 1958 British Empire and Commonwealth Games in Cardiff, Wales, where he competed in the heavyweight event and lost to Welshman Roger Pleace in the semi-final round.

After the Games, Thomson continued to fight at international level for Scotland as an amateur, and in 1961 returned to the heavyweight category after a spell at light-heavyweight.

By trade, Thomson was a brewery engineer in Edinburgh and won the 1962 Scottish heavyweight title.
