= Johnny Cooke =

English boxer (1934–2024)

Personal information
- Nickname: Cookie
- Nationality: British (English)
- Born: 17 December 1934 Bootle, England
- Died: 29 June 2024 (aged 89) Bootle, England
- Weight: Lightweight; Light welterweight Welterweight; Light middleweight Middleweight

Boxing career

Boxing record
- Total fights: 93
- Wins: 52 (KO 5)
- Losses: 34 (KO 8)
- Draws: 7
Medal record
Boxing
Representing England
British Empire & Commonwealth Games
Bronze medal – third place	1958 Cardiff	-60 kg

John Cooke (17 December 1934 – 29 June 2024) was an English amateur lightweight and professional light welter, welter, light middle and middleweight boxer.

== Amateur career ==
Cooke was born in Bootle. He was runner-up for the 1958 Amateur Boxing Association of England (ABAE) featherweight title, against Richard McTaggart (Royal Air Force), boxing out of Maple Leaf ABC.

He represented the England team during the boxing tournament at the 1958 British Empire and Commonwealth Games and won a bronze medal in the -60 Kg division. He only lost 16 of 368 recorded contests as an amateur.

== Professional career ==
Cooke made his professional debut on 28 June 1960, aged 25, against Ken Pugh and fought in ninety-three fights until 1971. As a professional he won the British Boxing Board of Control (BBBofC) Central Area lightweight title, beating his cousin, Dave Coventry, for the BBBofC Central Area welterweight title, BBBofC British welterweight title, and Commonwealth welterweight title, and was a challenger for the European Boxing Union (EBU) welterweight title against Carmelo Bossi, his professional fighting weight varied from 133 3/4 lb (60.7 kg; 9 st 7.8 lb), i.e. light welterweight to 157 1/4 lb (71.3 kg; 11 st 3.3 lb), i.e. middleweight. Cooke was managed by Johnny Campbell (c. 1905 – 2 May 1994), credited as "the man who put Birkenhead on the map".

== Death ==
Cooke died from pneumonia in Bootle on 29 June 2024, at the age of 89.
