= Bernard Robson =

Welsh boxer

Personal information
- Nationality: British (Welsh)
- Born: 1928 Cardiff, Wales

Sport
- Sport: Boxing
- Event(s): Featherweight; Lightweight
- Club: Croyon ABC; Horley ABC

Joseph Bernard Robson (born 1928) was a boxer who competed for Wales at the Commonwealth Games.

== Biography ==
Robson initially boxed out of the Croydon ABC when he first represented Wales at international level and boxed at featherweight. He was the first Welshman from outside the Principality to box for Wales.

In November 1952 he left Croydon for Horley ABC and lived at 57 Albert Road in Horley.

A cable joiner by trade, he stepped up to lightweight and was selected for the 1958 Welsh team for the 1958 British Empire and Commonwealth Games in Cardiff, Wales. He competed in the lightweight category, where he was beaten by eventual silver medallist Jim Jordan of Northern Ireland.
