= Athletics at the 1957 World University Games – Women's discus throw =

The women's discus throw event at the 1957 World University Games was held at the Stadium Charlety in Paris on 8 September 1957.

== Results ==
Rank	Name	Nationality	#1	#2	#3	#4	#5	#6	Result	Notes
1st place, gold medalist(s)	Irina Beglyakova	Soviet Union	48.83	42.55	45.14	48.71	47.64	x	48.83	
2nd place, silver medalist(s)	Györgyi Hegedus	Hungary	44.40	31.77	41.87	37.07	x	45.11	45.11	
3rd place, bronze medalist(s)	Ida Bucsányi	Hungary	42.22	42.28	36.55	41.40	39.98	43.64	43.64	
4	Maya Giri	Great Britain	42.46	36.01	x	38.36	36.34	41.92	42.46	
5	Elivia Ricci	Italy	32.40	35.78	41.85	40.75	42.05	41.15	41.85	
6	Earlene Brown	United States	x	41.40	35.40	40.60	41.54	38.92	41.40	
7	Inkeri Talvitie	Finland							41.32	
8	Lucacci	Romania							41.28	
9	Cecylia Lorencik	Poland							40.73	
10	Almut Brömmel	West Germany							40.50	
11	Marthe Bretelle	France							37.63	
12	Hannelore Klute	West Germany							37.10	
13	Diana Will	Great Britain							31.87	
14	Antonia Vehoff	West Germany							31.19	
