= Ron Roach =

Welsh cyclist

Personal information
- Nationality: British (Welsh)
- Born: October 27, 1934 Pontypridd, Wales
- Died: October 13, 2021 (aged 86) Abergavenny, Wales

Sport
- Sport: Cycling
- Event: Road
- Club: Cardiff Byways CC

Ronald Stuart Roach (27 October 1934 – 13 October 2021) was a racing cyclist from Wales, who represented Wales at the British Empire Games (now Commonwealth Games).

== Biography ==
Roach was a member of Cardiff Byways Cycling Club. He rode for Wales in the Isle of Man Manx international and impressed during the International.

He represented the 1958 Welsh Team at the 1958 British Empire and Commonwealth Games in Cardiff, Wales, participating in one cycling program event; the road race.
