= Chris Hughes (cyclist) =

Welsh cyclist

Personal information
- Nationality: British (Welsh)

Sport
- Sport: Cycling
- Event: Road
- Club: Acme Wheelers, Rhondda

Chris Hughes is a former racing cyclist from Wales, who represented Wales at the British Empire Games (now Commonwealth Games).

== Biography ==
Hughes was a member of the Acme Wheelers in Rhondda. He rode for Wales in the Isle of Man Manx international and impressed during the event.

He was a planning engineer by profession, living at Cymmer, when he won the 1958 Welsh championship over 50 miles. He also won the Welsh 120 miles mass start title for three consecutive years from 1956 to 1958 and won the 1958 Rhondda CC 83 mile massed start race, defeating Danny Morgan into second place.

He represented the 1958 Welsh Team at the 1958 British Empire and Commonwealth Games in Cardiff, Wales, participating in one cycling program event; the road race.

Hughes' brother Dai was also a prominent cyclist.
