= Hislop Dickson =

Scottish cyclist

Personal information
- Nationality: British (Scotland)
- Born: 1 September 1933 Scotland
- Died: 3 July 2024 (aged 90) Scotland

Sport
- Sport: Cycling
- Event: Track
- Club: Portsmouth North End; Glasgow Ivy CC

Andrew Hislop Dickson (1 September 1933 – 3 July 2024) was a racing cyclist from Scotland, who represented Scotland at the British Empire Games (now Commonwealth Games).

== Biography ==
Dickson was the 1958 Scottish champion over 4,000 metres pursuit, defeating Eddie Brown in the final and was the Scottish champion over 25 miles.

He rode for Portsmouth North End before joining Glasgow Ivy Cycling Club. Also in 1958 he won the Army Cycling Union title in a time of 57mins 51 seconds, which was only 10 seconds outside the all-time record.

He represented the 1958 Scottish Team at the 1958 British Empire and Commonwealth Games in Cardiff, Wales, participating in one cycling program event; the individual pursuit

A joiner by profession he regained the Scottish 25 mile championship in 1961.
