= Ronnie Park =

Scottish cyclist

Personal information
- Nationality: British (Scottish)
- Born: 6 July 1933 Glasgow, Scotland
- Died: 4 December 1991 (aged 58) Marple, Greater Manchester, England

Sport
- Sport: cycling
- Events: Road race, scratch, pursuit
- Club: Velo Club Stella, Glasgow

Ronald Andrew Park (6 July 1933 – 12 April 1991) was a Scottish cyclist who appeared at two Commonwealth Games.

== Biography ==
Park was born in Glasgow and was a member of the Velo Club Stella of Glasgow and won the 1954 Carluke C.C. 45 miles pursuit road race.

He was the sole cycling representative for the Scottish team at the 1954 British Empire and Commonwealth Games in Vancouver, Canada, where he participated in the road race, scratch and pursuit events.

By 1957, he was concentrating primarily on road racing and won the King of the Mountains and most aggressive rider award at the Glasgow to Dundee race. Leading up to a second Commonwealth Games, Park won the 65 miles Law Wheelers race in a near record time.

He was selected for the 1958 Scottish team for the 1958 British Empire and Commonwealth Games in Cardiff, Wales, but this time only competed in the read race.

In 1959, Parks along with two fellow international riders fell foul of the Scottish Cycling Union because of their conduct in relation to two races. Ken Laidlaw and Ernie Scally both received a one-year ban while Parks who was living at Wallacewell Road in Balornock, was banned for eight months.
