= Eamon Burns (cyclist) =

Northern Irish cyclist

Personal information
- Nationality: British (Northern Irish)

Sport
- Sport: Cycling
- Events: Track and Road
- Club: St. Gabriel's CC, Belfast

Eamon Burns is a former racing cyclist from Northern Ireland, who represented Northern Ireland at the British Empire Games (now Commonwealth Games).

== Biography ==
Burns was a member of the St. Gabriel's Cycling Club of Belfast and was nominated by the Northern Ireland Cycling Federation for the shortlist for the 1958 British Empire and Commonwealth Games in Cardiff, Wales.

He subsequently represented the 1958 Northern Irish Team at the 1958 British Empire and Commonwealth Games, participating in one cycling program event; the road race.
