= Donald Braithwaite =

Welsh boxer (1936–2017)

Donald Braithwaite, BEM
Personal information
- Nickname: Don
- Nationality: Welsh
- Born: Donald G. Braithwaite; 1936 Caerphilly, Wales
- Died: 16 March 2017 (aged 80–81) Caerphilly, Wales
- Weight: Flyweight

Boxing career

Boxing record
- Total fights: 27
- Wins: 13
- Win by KO: 3
- Losses: 11
- Draws: 3
- No contests: 0

Donald Braithwaite
Medal record

Representing Wales

Commonwealth Games
Bronze medal – third place	1958 Cardiff	Flyweight

Donald Graham Braithwaite BEM (1936 – 16 March 2017) was a Welsh professional boxer from Caerphilly, Wales, who competed in the flyweight division during his career. As an amateur he represented Wales as a flyweight in the 1958 British Empire and Commonwealth Games winning a bronze medal. Donald become a Medallist of the Order of the British Empire in the Queens birthday honours 2015 for services to boxing, the opportunities he's provided for youngsters and his support for a variety of charities, Don was also awarded a lifetime fellowship member of Swansea University for his support in research for brain injury in sport.

Braithwaite died on 16 March 2017, at the age 80–81.

== Boxing career ==
=== Amateur years ===
Braithwaite was born in Wales in 1936. He began boxing as an amateur at the age of 12 and in 1958 he was selected to represent Wales at the British Empire and Commonwealth games which was held in Cardiff in his home country. At the Games Braithwaite was drawn against Rhodesian fighter William Pretorius in his first round. Braithwaite beat Pretorius on points, which saw him face Scotland's Jackie Brown in the semi-finals. Braithwaite was beaten on points, and Brown went on to win his final bout to take the gold medal. Despite losing against Brown, there were no third place eliminator, and both he and Ireland's Peter Lavery were awarded the bronze medal.

=== Professional career ===
Braithwaite turned professional shortly after his Commonwealth success. Boxrec record Braithwaite's first professional bout as 12 January 1959 against Billy Downer, a journeyman from London. The six round fight went the distance with the decision given to Braithwaite on points. His first year as a professional was fairly successful, with six wins and a draw over three losses. Towards the end of the year, in November, Braithwaite fought at the National Sporting Club in London for the first time. There he beat Yorkshire fighter Eddie Baraclough, who was disqualified in the fourth round.

1960 began well for Braithwaite, with a win over Bernie Dillon in London and three successful encounters against fellow Welshman Errol Flynn. One of the fights with Flynn saw Braithwaite back at the National Sporting Club, and he returned twice more in 1960 losing both fights, the first to Billy Walker in September and then Brian Cartwright in October. He finished the year with two eight round points wins, over Brian Bissmire and Billy Colvin.

Braithwaite began 1961 with a rematch with Colvin, the result was identical, a points win for Braithwaite after eight rounds. This was followed with a defeat to Bissmire and then a draw against London fighter Derek Lloyd. A rematch was arranged against Lloyd in March, which Lloyd won by knockout in the third. This was the first time that Braithwaite had been knocked out in his professional career. In May he travelled abroad to face Jean Guerard, the ex-flyweight French champion. Braithwaite suffered another knockout, with guerard stopping the Welshman in the third round. On his return to Britain he managed a draw with George McDade before he finished the year with two loses, the first to Alex O'Neil and the second to future Scottish flyweight champion Danny Lee.

Braithwaite fought once in 1962, a loss to Ernie Butterworth, but an industrial accident in 1963 ended any chance of future professional fights.

=== As a trainer ===
Braithwaite was never able to earn a living from fighting and worked as a labourer throughout his career. His accident in 1963 saw Braithwaite hospitalised for nine months and he suffered brain damage for some time afterwards. In 1964 he opened Wingfield Amateur Boxing Club, and the club has moved to several locations over its lifetime, becoming All Saints ABC in Virginia Park in Caerphilly. The club has started the careers of several notable fighters, including two amateurs that have also won Commonwealth medals, Anthony Davies (silver – light flyweight 1970) and Aneurin Evans (silver super heavyweight 1986). Donald become a Medallist of the Order of the British Empire BEM (British Empire Medal) in the Queens birthday honours 2015 for services to boxing, the opportunities he's provided for youngsters and his support for a variety of charities.

In 2016, to celebrate his 80th birthday, local brewer, Brains, created a beer in his honour, named 'The Don'.
