= Norman Hooper =

Welsh cyclist (1935–2025)

Personal information
- Nationality: British (Welsh)
- Born: 2 September 1935 Pontypool, Monmouthshire, Wales
- Died: 29 September 2025 (aged 90) Winterley, Cheshire, England

Sport
- Sport: Cycling
- Event: Road
- Club: Port Talbot Wheelers; Earlswood RC, Birmingham

Norman Allan Hooper (2 September 1935 – 29 September 2025) was a Welsh racing cyclist, who represented Wales at the British Empire Games (now Commonwealth Games).

== Biography ==
Hooper, born in Pontypool, Monmouthshire, Wales on 2 September 1935, rode for the Port Talbot Wheelers before joining the Earlswood Road Club in Birmingham. He had moved from Wales to live in Halesowen but had Welsh parents.

He rode for Wales in the Isle of Man Manx international and represented the 1958 Welsh Team at the 1958 British Empire and Commonwealth Games in Cardiff, Wales, participating in one cycling program event; the road race.

Hooper died in Winterley, Cheshire, England on 29 September 2025, at the age of 90.
