= Harry Weber =

Harry Weber may refer to:

- Harry Weber (sculptor) (born 1942), American sculptor
- Harry Weber (baseball) (1862–1926), American Major League Baseball catcher

== See also ==
- Harold Weber (1882–1933), American golfer
- Harry Webber (1936–2013), South African weightlifter
- Harry Webber (American football) (1892–1970), American football player
