= Danny Morgan (cyclist) =

Welsh cyclist

Personal information
- Nationality: British (Welsh)

Sport
- Sport: Cycling
- Event: Road
- Club: Cardiff Byways CC

Danny Morgan is a former racing cyclist from Wales, who represented Wales at the British Empire Games (now Commonwealth Games).

== Biography ==
Morgan was a member of the Cardiff Byways Cycling Club and finished runner-up behind Chris Hughes in the 1958 Rhondda CC 83 mile massed start race. He rode for Wales in the Isle of Man Manx international and impressed during the International.

He represented the 1958 Welsh Team at the 1958 British Empire and Commonwealth Games in Cardiff, Wales, participating in one cycling program event; the road race.

He was omitted from the 1966 British Empire and Commonwealth Games team despite winning the Welsh 100 miles championship and breaking the championship record in July 1966.
