= Scotland at the 1958 British Empire and Commonwealth Games =

- CG code: SCO
- CGA: Scotland at the Commonwealth Games
- Website: www.teamscotland.scot

in Cardiff, Wales
- Medals Ranked 4th: Gold 5 Silver 3 Bronze 3 Total 11

British Empire and Commonwealth Games appearances
- 1930; 1934; 1938; 1950; 1954; 1958; 1962; 1966; 1970; 1974; 1978; 1982; 1986; 1990; 1994; 1998; 2002; 2006; 2010; 2014; 2018; 2022; 2026; 2030

Scotland at the 1958 British Empire and Commonwealth Games (abbreviated SCO) was the sixth time that the nation had participated at the Games.

The Games were held in Cardiff, Wales, from 18 to 26 July 1958. Scotland came fourth overall with five gold, five silver and three bronze medals.

== Medals ==
=== Gold ===
- Ian Black (swimming)
- Jackie Brown (boxing)
- Phil Caira (weightlifting)
- Peter Heatly (diving)
- Dick McTaggart (boxing)

=== Silver ===
- Ian Black (swimming)
- Alastair Duncan (wrestling)
- George Farquhar (wrestling)
- Bobby Kane (boxing)
- men's 4×220 yd freestyle relay team (swimming)

=== Bronze ===
- Willie Bannon (boxing)
- Bertie Scott (boxing)
- Freddie Owen (boxing)

== Team ==
=== Athletics ===
Men

Athlete	Events	Club	Medals
Mike Berisford	1 mile	Sale Harriers	
Ian Binnie	3 mile	Victoria Park AAC	
Gavin Carragher	100y	London AC	
Bob Cockburn	110y, 220y	Edinburgh Southern Harriers	
Joe Connolly	3, 6 miles	Bellahouston Harriers	
Ewan Douglas	Hammer throw	Field Events Club	
Allan Dunbar	100y	Victoria Park AAC	
James Edgar	100y	Glasgow Police	
Graham Everett	880y, 1 mile	Shettleston Harriers	
Crawford Fairbrother	High jump	Victoria Park AAC	
Harry Fenion	marathon	Bellahouston Harriers	
Graham Fleck	220y	Bellahouston Harriers	
Hugo Fox	marathon	Shettleston Harriers	
Alan Gordon	1 mile	Achilles Club	
Alex Grant	Long jump	Cambridge University	
Alec Hannah	440y hurdles	Edinburgh University	
Robert Hay	440y	Edinburgh University	
Bill Henderson	220y	Watsonians AC	
Peter Isbester	Discus throw	Ilford AC	
Mike Lindsay	Discus throw, Shot put	Oklahoma University	
Lesley Locke	880y	London University	
Donald McDonald	880y, 4×400 relay	Garscube Harriers	
Alex McDougall	marathon	Vale of Leven AC	
John MacIsaac	440y, 4×400 relay	Victoria Park AAC	
Hugh Murray	Triple jump	Edinburgh University	
Jim Paterson	440y, 880y, 4×400 relay	Edinburgh University	
Bob Scott	Hammer throw	Atalanta AC	
Ronnie Thomson	440y, 4×400 relay	Cambridge University	
Alec Valentine	Hammer throw	Royal Navy AC	
Alastair Wood	3, 6 miles	Royal Air Force AC	

Women

Athlete	Events	Club	Medals
Isabel Bond	220y, 4×110 relay	Ardeer AC	
Moira Campbell	100y, 220y, 4×110 relay	Maryhill Harriers	
Toni Ireland	discus	Edinburgh University	
Alix Jamieson	100y, 220y, high jump	Maryhill Harriers	
Rosemary Charters	discus	Edinburgh Southern Harriers	
Mary Symon	100y, 4×110 relay	Bellahouston Harriers	
Doris Tyndall	100y, 220y, 4×110 relay	Tayside AC	
Diana Will	discus	Aberdeen University AC	

=== Boxing ===
Athlete	Events	Club	Medals
Willie Bannon	81kg Light Heavyweight	Dundee Hawkhill ABC	Bronze medal
Jackie Brown	51kg Flyweight	Leith Victoria	Gold medal
Bertie Scott	67kg Welterweight	Glasgow Transport	Bronze medal
George Drummond	57kg Featherweight	Woodside	
Bobby Kane	63.5kg Light welterweight	Greenock St Mungo ABC	Silver medal
Tommy McGuinness	71kg Light middleweight	Sparta, Edinburgh	
Alistair McKenzie	75kg Middleweight	Glasgow Police	
Dick McTaggart	60kg Lightweight	R.A.F & Dundee	Gold medal
Freddie Owen	54kg Bantamweight	Dennistoun Y.C.	Bronze medal
Angus Thomson	91kg Heavyweight	Leith Victoria	

=== Cycling ===
Athlete	Events	Club	Medals
Eddie Brown	pursuit	Stirlingshire RC	
Hislop Dickson	pursuit	Glasgow Ivy CC	
Alfie Fairweather	time trial	Glasgow Wheelers	
Ken Laidlaw	Road race	Musselburgh CC	
Donald Langlands	scratch	Forfarshire RC	
Hector McKenzie	scratch, sprint, time trial	Glasgow Douglas CC	
Ronnie Park	Road race	Velo Club Stella, Glasgow	
Ernie Scally	Road race, scratch	Glasgow Nightingale & Army CU	
Jimmy Williams	Road race	Edina Couriers, Edinburgh	

=== Diving ===
Men

Athlete	Events	Club	Medals
Brian Davidson	platform, springboard	Inverness L.M.S.	
Peter Heatly	platform	Portobello	Gold medal
Bill Law	platform, springboard	Warrender ASC, Edinburgh	

Women

Athlete	Events	Club	Medals
Valerie Marrian	springboard	Warrender ASC, Edinburgh	

=== Fencing ===
Men

Athlete	Events	Club	Medals
Tom Broadhurst	Foil Individual	Ardeer Recreation FC	
John King	Épée Individual	Bon Accord FC	
Sandy Leckie	Sabre Individual	Salle Nicklen	
L. G. Morrison	Foil Individual	Scottish FC, Edinburgh	
R. T. Richardson	Foil Individual	Ardeer Recreation FC	
J. G. Tapley	Épée Individual	Ardeer Recreation FC	
A. G. Watson	Épée Individual	Edinburgh	

Women

Athlete	Events	Club	Medals
Doreen Plews	Foil Individual	Newton Mearns	
Christine Tolland	Foil Individual	Sword Club, Glasgow	

=== Lawn bowls ===
Athlete	Events	Club	Medals
William Downes Jones	singles	Ardrossan BC	
George Ferguson	fours/rinks	Cumnock BC	
John Hampson	fours/rinks	Cumnock BC	
Alexander Hodge	fours/rinks	Cumnock BC	
Jim Kerr	pairs	Merchiston Edinburgh BC	
David Smart	pairs	Merchiston Edinburgh BC	
Thomas Smetherham	fours/rinks	Cumnock BC	

=== Rowing ===
Athlete	Events	Club	Medals
G. C Cowley	coxed four	Edinburgh University BC	
A. G. Cross	eight	Balfron	
T. Gillies	eight	Alexandria	
G. F. Gray	eight	Glasgow	
I. G. Inglis	eight	Ayr	
A. Lindsay	eight	Largs	
W. K. Millar	coxed four	Edinburgh University BC	
A. T. Nelson	eight	Alexandria	
B. Parsonage	eight (cox)	Glasgow	
R. Forbes Rintou	coxed four	Edinburgh University BC	
J. Ross	eight	Glasgow	
Ken J. Scott	eight	St Andrew BC	
J. B. Tait	coxed four, cox	Edinburgh University BC	
R. N. T. Thin	coxed four	Edinburgh University BC	

=== Swimming ===
Men

Athlete	Events	Club	Medals
Jack Baillie	440y freestyle	Renfrew Aqua	
Ian Black	220y butterfly, 440y freestyle, 2 x relay	Robert Gordon College	,,
Alex Galletly	110y backstroke	Pullars ASC, Perth	
Billy Good	1650y freestyle	Aberdeen Univ	
Jim Hill	110y backstroke/freestyle, medley relay	Warrender Baths, Edinburgh	
James Leiper	110y freestyle, relay	Stonehaven ASC	Silver medal
Iain Percy-Robb	220y breaststroke, medley relay	Warrender Baths, Edinburgh	
Bob Sreenan	440y, 1650y freestyle, relay	Dundee Whitehall	Silver medal
Athole Still	110y freestyle, 2 x relay	Gordonians SC, Aberdeen	Silver medal

Women

Athlete	Events	Club	Medals
Margaret Girvan	440y freestyle, relay	Motherwell AS&WP Club	
Betty Gunn	110y freestyle, relay	Aberdeen Thistle SC	
Christine Harris	110y freestyle, relay	Carnegie SC, Dunfermline	
Frances Hogben	110y freestyle, 2 x relays	Arbroath SC	
Margaret McDowall	110y backstroke, medley relay	Kilmarnock SC	
Nan Rae	440y freestyle	Motherwell AS&WP Club	
Jean Taylor	440y freestyle	Criterion SC, Aberdeen	
Alison Turnbull	220y breaststroke, medley relay	Galashiels	
Sheila Watt	110y butterfly, medley relay	Aberdeen Thistle SC	

=== Weightlifting ===
Athlete	Events	Club	Medals
John Cannon	56kg bantamweight	Ayr Health & Strength Club	
Phil Caira	82.5kg light heavyweight	Phil Caira Physical School of Training, Kirkcaldy	Gold medal
Jimmy Moir	60kg featherweight	Viking WC, Glasgow	
Billy Orbin	67.5kg lightweight	Motherwell Y.M.C.A. WC	
John Wright	75kg middleweight	Rosyth Physical Culture School	

=== Wrestling ===
Athlete	Events	Club	Medals
Jock Bews	52kg flyweight	Milton AWC, Edinburgh	
Alastair Duncan	68kg lightweight	NB Loco, Glasgow	Silver medal
George Farquhar	82kg middleweight	Milton AWC, Edinburgh	Silver medal
George McKenzie	74kg welterweight	Leith AWC, Edinburgh	
Angus McRitchie	90kg light-heavyweight	Glasgow Police	
Robert Parsons	62kg featherweight	Milton AWC, Edinburgh	
Jim Turnbull	57kg bantamweight	Milton AWC, Edinburgh	

== See also ==
- Scotland at the Commonwealth Games
