= Jimmy Williams (cyclist) =

Scottish cyclist

Personal information
- Nationality: British (Scotland)

Sport
- Sport: Cycling
- Event: Road
- Club: Edina Couriers, Edinburgh

Jimmy Williams is a former racing cyclist from Scotland, who represented Scotland at the British Empire Games (now Commonwealth Games).

== Biography ==
Williams was a member of the Edina Couriers of Edinburgh and won the 1957 Scottish hill climb championships. In 1958 he won the 90 mile White Heather road race despite suffering a puncture.

He represented the 1958 Scottish Team at the 1958 British Empire and Commonwealth Games in Cardiff, Wales, participating in one cycling program event; the road race

Shortly after the games, Williams tied for second place with Ken Laidlaw in the Dunedin 50 miles time trial.
