= Jim Maguire (cyclist) =

Northern Irish cyclist

Personal information
- Nationality: British (Northern Irish)
- Born: c. 1935

Sport
- Sport: Cycling
- Events: Track and Road
- Club: Windsor CC, Belfast

Jim Maguire (born c.1935) is a former racing cyclist from Northern Ireland, who represented Northern Ireland at the British Empire Games (now Commonwealth Games).

== Biography ==
Maguire was a member of the Windsor Cycling Club of Belfast. He won the 1957 Dublin Birr mass start and was nominated by the Northern Ireland Cycling Federation for the shortlist for the 1958 British Empire and Commonwealth Games in Cardiff, Wales.

Maguire subsequently represented the 1958 Northern Irish Team at the 1958 British Empire and Commonwealth Games, participating in one cycling program event; the road race

He was an E.B.N.I. surveyor by profession.
