= Alison Turnbull (swimmer) =

Scottish swimmer

Personal information
- Nationality: British (Scotland)
- Born: c.1945 Scotland

Sport
- Sport: Swimming
- Event: Breaststroke
- Club: Galashiels SC

Alison M. R. Turnbull (born c.1945) is a former swimmer from Scotland, who represented Scotland at the British Empire and Commonwealth Games (now Commonwealth Games).

== Biography ==
Turnbull came to prominence as a 12-year-old, when winning the 1957 Scottish Schools' Swimming Association 50 yards breaststroke title, while a pupil at Galashiels Academy. In September 1957, now aged 13, she was selected for the Scottish national team.

She represented the 1958 Scottish swimming team at the 1958 British Empire and Commonwealth Games in Cardiff, Wales, participating in the 220 yards breaststroke event, where she reached the final and the 4 x 110 yards medley relay, finishing seventh, with Frances Hogben, Jean Taylor and Sheila Watt.

She was a member of the Galashiels Swimming Club and in 1959 won the Scottish title and broke the Scottish record for the 200 yards breaststroke, in addition to claiming a bronze at the 1960 British Swimming Championships.
