= Bill Brown (boxer) =

Welsh boxer

Personal information
- Nationality: British (Welsh)

Sport
- Sport: Boxing
- Event: Light middleweight
- Club: Barry ABC; Cardiff Gas BC
Medal record
Representing (Wales)
Commonwealth Games
Bronze medal – third place	1958 Cardiff	light-middleweight

William George Brown better known as Bill Brown is a Welsh former boxer who boxed for the Cardiff Gas Boxing Club and won a bronze medal at the Commonwealth Games in 1958. He is not to be confused with his older brother Bobby Brown, also of the Cardiff Gas Boxing Club and who withdrew from the 1958 Welsh Commonwealth Games team because he could not get time off work.

== Biography ==
Brown was from Cadoxton, Vale of Glamorgan. In 1945, Brown and his older brother Bobby both joined the Barry Amateur Boxing Club after their father George Brown took them to the club. They both won British schoolboy titles and British Army Cadet titles. In 1958, both Bill and Bobby came out of retirement to join their old coach Bill Manning at Cardiff Gas Boxing Club and targeted the 1958 British Empire and Commonwealth Games in Cardiff, Wales.

Bill and Bobby were both subsequently selected for the 1958 Welsh team, although Bobby withdrew. Bill competed in the Light middleweight category and won the bronze medal.

He defeated Samuels of Ghana in the first round and the Scottish champion Tommy McGuiness before coming up against ABA champion Stuart Pearson in the semi-final. Despite knocking Pearson down twice, Brown lost on a points. The Welsh boxing team secured six medals from ten weight classes.
