= Joey Jacobs Sr. =

Former boxer who competed for England

Personal information
- Nationality: British (English)
- Born: 5 December 1937 (age 88) Manchester, England

Sport
- Sport: Boxing
- Event: Light-welterweight
- Club: Victoria Avenue, Manchester
Medal record
Boxing
Representing England
British Empire & Commonwealth Games
Bronze medal – third place	1958 Cardiff	-63.5 kg

Joseph Jacobs Sr. (born 5 December 1937) is a male former boxer who competed for England.

== Biography ==
Jacobs represented the England team during the boxing tournament at the 1958 British Empire and Commonwealth Games and won a bronze medal in the -63.5 Kg division. He made his professional debut on 12 December 1960 and fought in five fights until 1961.

His son Joey Jacobs repeated his Commonwealth Games achievement in 1986.
