= Go Yeong-chang =

South Korean weightlifter

Personal information
- Nationality: South Korean
- Born: 21 March 1926; Seoul, Korea

Sport
- Sport: Weightlifting

Go Yeong-chang (born 21 March 1926) was a South Korean weightlifter. He competed in the men's middleweight event at the 1960 Summer Olympics in Rome, Italy.
