= Toni Ireland =

Scottish athlete

Personal information
- Nationality: British (Scottish)

Sport
- Sport: Athletics
- Event: Discus throw / javelin / hurdles
- Club: Edinburgh University AC; Edinburgh Southern Harriers

Antonia "Toni" Ireland is a former track and field athlete from Scotland who competed at the 1958 British Empire and Commonwealth Games (now Commonwealth Games).

== Biography ==
Ireland studied at the University of Edinburgh and was a member of their athletics club. Although she specialised in the throwing events, she was proficient at the hurdles and won three events at the Edinburgh University sports annual meeting in 1957.

She represented the Scottish Empire and Commonwealth Games team at the 1958 British Empire Games in Cardiff, Wales, participating in one event, the discus throw event.

After leaving university she competed for the Edinburgh Southern Harriers. She emigrated to Canada for a short time before returning to Scotland. In 1963 she retired from competitive events and was the assistant team manager for the Scottish team.
