= Ron Jones =

Ron Jones may refer to:

- Ron Jones (television director) (1945–1995), British television director
- Ron Jones (teacher) (born 1941), American writer and teacher, known for his classroom experiment in Fascism
- Ron Jones (composer) (born 1954), American composer for TV shows
- Ron Jones (sprinter) (1934–2021), Welsh track and field athlete
- Ron Jones (high jumper) (born 1962), American high jumper, All-American for the Indiana Hoosiers track and field team
- Ron Jones (baseball) (1964–2006), 1980s baseball player for the Philadelphia Phillies
- Ron Jones (ice hockey) (born 1951), retired Canadian 1970s ice hockey player
- Ron Jones (American football) (born 1947), 1960s American football player
- Ron Jones (commentator), Welsh-born BBC radio sports commentator
- Ron Jones (businessman) (born 1948), British businessman with Tinopolis
- Ron Jones (footballer) (1914–2010), Welsh footballer
- Ron Jones (rugby union) (born 1943), Welsh rugby player
- Ron Jones (gynaecologist) (1939–2025), New Zealand obstetrician and gynaecologist
- Ron Cephas Jones (1957–2023), American actor
- Ron Christopher Jones, American actor and production manager

== See also ==
- Ronald Jones (disambiguation)
