= Ambrosio Solorzano =

Venezuelan weightlifter

Personal information
- Born: 7 December 1937 (age 88) Caracas, Venezuela

Sport
- Sport: Weightlifting

Ambrosio Solorzano (born 7 December 1937) is a Venezuelan weightlifter. He competed in the men's middleweight event at the 1960 Summer Olympics.
