= Terry Pelan =

Northern Irish weightlifter

Personal information
- Nationality: British (Northern Irish)
- Born: c.1931

Sport
- Sport: Weightlifting
- Event: Lightweight
- Club: Belfast

Terry Pelan (born c.1931) is a former weightlifter from Northern Ireland, who represented Northern Ireland at the British Empire and Commonwealth Games (now Commonwealth Games).

== Biography ==
Pelan was the 1957 Irish junior lightweight champion.

Pelan represented the 1958 Northern Irish Team at the 1958 British Empire and Commonwealth Games in Cardiff, Wales, participating in the 67.5kg lightweight. He participated despite suffering an injury leading up to the Games.

He was a typewriter mechanic by profession and represented Ireland against Scotland in the 1959 international and was also the sports officer to the 23rd St Patrick's Boys' Brigade.

He missed out on the 1960 Summer Olympics but did win the middleweight title of Ireland. In 1961 he saved the life of a 12-year-old girl after rescuing her from drowning in swamps. He was an instrument fitter for the Royal Electrical and Mechanical Engineers at Kinnegar, Holywood at the time and was living at 7 Church Street East, Belfast.
