= John Heywood (weightlifter) =

Welsh weightlifter

Personal information
- Nationality: British (Welsh)

Sport
- Sport: Weightlifting
- Event: Featherweight

John Heywood is a former weightlifter from Wales, who competed at the 1958 British Empire and Commonwealth Games (now Commonwealth Games).

== Biography ==
Heywood from Llansamlet, won the 1955 Welsh national title.

In March 1958, he participated in the Welsh Olympic Championships and Empire Games trials and was one of the 7 athletes (out of 26) that was short-listed for the Games.

Heywood subsequently represented the 1958 Welsh team at the 1958 British Empire and Commonwealth Games in Cardiff, Wales, where he participated in the 60kg featherweight category.
