= Glyn Waters =

Welsh boxer

Personal information
- Nationality: British (Welsh)
- Born: March 1937 Newport, Wales
- Died: 2013 Stratford, London, England

Sport
- Sport: Boxing
- Event: Middleweight
- Club: Newport Sporting Club

Glyn Mostyn Paul Waters (April 1937–2013) was a boxer who competed for Wales at the Commonwealth Games.

== Biography ==
Waters boxed out of the Newport Sporting Club and was the 1957 Welsh ABA champion at light-heavyweight.

Waters stepped up to middleweight and won the middleweight championship of Wales in 1958.

An electrician by trade, he carried a nose injury into the Empire Games but successfully passed the doctors check at weigh-in to compete. Wales had already lost one of their boxers (Cedric Williams) to injury before the Games started.

He subsequently represented the 1958 Welsh team for the 1958 British Empire and Commonwealth Games in Cardiff, Wales, where competed in the middleweight category.

Waters was from a boxing family, his father Walt Waters was the 1921 Welsh middleweight champion and his brother Colin Waters was a four-times middleweight champion of Wales in 1957, 1959, 1960 and 1963.
