= John McClory =

Northern Irish boxer

Personal information
- Nationality: British (Northern Irish)
- Born: 1936 (age 89–90)

Sport
- Sport: Boxing
- Event: Featherweight
- Club: Holy Family BC, Belfast
Medal record
Representing Northern Ireland
Commonwealth Games
Bronze medal – third place	1958 Cardiff	featherweight

John McClory (born 1936) is a former Northern Irish boxer who won a bronze medal at the Commonwealth Games.

== Biography ==
McClory was a member of the Holy Family Boxing Club of Belfast and won the Irish featherweight title in March 1958.

He was selected for the 1958 Northern Irish team for the 1958 British Empire and Commonwealth Games in Cardiff, Wales, where he competed in the 57kg featherweight category and won the bronze medal.

He was a surprise omission from the Irish team for the a meeting in Dublin in October 1958 but the Belfast storekeeper continued to box at the highest level, representing Ireland against Germany in October 1960. He went on to coach boxers including a spell at the Dominic Savio Boxing club of Belfast in 1963.
