= Ken McDonald (weightlifter) =

Australian weightlifter (1928–2015)

Personal information
- Nationality: Australian/British
- Born: 14 August 1928 New South Wales, Australia
- Died: 24 January 2015 (aged 86) Runaway Bay, Queensland, Australia

Sport
- Sport: Weightlifting
- Club: YMCA Club, London
Medal record
weightlifting
Representing England
British Empire & Commonwealth Games
Gold medal – first place	1958 Cardiff	110 Kg combined

Kenneth Arthur McDonald (14 August 1928 – 24 January 2015) was an Australian weightlifter who represented both Australia and England.

== Biography ==
McDonald represented Australia at the 1952 Summer Olympics finishing in sixth place in the middle-heavyweight category.

He represented England and won a gold medal in the -110 Kg combined category at the 1958 British Empire and Commonwealth Games in Cardiff, Wales.

McDonald was a member of the YMCA Club in central London from 1950 until 1980. He died on 24 January 2015, at the age of 86.
