= Bertie Scott =

Scottish boxer

Personal information
- Nationality: British (Scottish)
- Born: 12 May 1933 Glasgow, Scotland
- Died: 5 February 2004 (aged 70)

Sport
- Sport: Boxing
- Event: Welterweight
- Club: Glasgow Transport
Medal record
Representing Scotland
Commonwealth Games
Bronze medal – third place	1958 Cardiff	welterweight

Robert Dickson Scott (12 May 1933 – 5 February 2004) was a Scottish boxer who won a bronze medal at the Commonwealth Games and won ten Scottish titles between 1950 and 1972.

== Biography ==
Scott was born in Kinnear Road, Glasgow and was a member of the Glasgow Transport Boxing Club, where he was coached by John Bell. He reached the final of the 1956 Scottish Amateur Championship light-welterweight championship but lost out to Tommy McGuinness.

By trade he was a coach builder with the Glasgow Corporation and he won the 1958 Scottish welterweight Championship.

He was selected for the 1958 Scottish team for the 1958 British Empire and Commonwealth Games in Cardiff, Wales, where he competed in the 67kg welterweight event and won the bronze medal.
