= Georges Freiburghaus =

Swiss weightlifter

Personal information
- Nationality: Swiss
- Born: 11 July 1927; Neuenegg, Switzerland

Sport
- Sport: Weightlifting

Georges Freiburghaus (born 11 July 1927) was a Swiss weightlifter. He competed in the men's middleweight event at the 1960 Summer Olympics.
