= David Dunseath =

Northern Irish swimmer

Personal information
- Nationality: British (Northern Irish)
- Born: 20 March 1936 Bangor, County Down, Northern Ireland
- Died: 10 March 2004 (aged 67) Bangor, County Down, Northern Ireland

Sport
- Sport: Swimming
- Event: Breaststroke
- Club: Bangor SC; Queen's University

David Hamilton Dunseath (20 March 1936 – 10 March 2004) was a swimmer from Northern Ireland, who represented Northern Ireland at the British Empire and Commonwealth Games (now Commonwealth Games).

== Biography ==
Dunseath was a member of the Bangor Swimming Club in Bangor, County Down and specialised in the breaststroke.

Dunseath attended the Queen's University Belfast and was also competent in the butterfly, finishing third in the 1956 Ulster championships.

He represented the 1958 Northern Irish Team at the 1958 British Empire and Commonwealth Games in Cardiff, Wales, participating in the 220 yards breaststroke and the medley relay events.
