= Billy Cooke (weightlifter) =

Northern Irish weightlifter

Personal information
- Nationality: British (Northern Irish)
- Born: c.1933

Sport
- Sport: Weightlifting
- Event: Middleweight
- Club: Belfast Health Studios

Billy Cooke (born c.1933) is a former weightlifter and strongman from Northern Ireland, who represented Northern Ireland at the British Empire and Commonwealth Games (now Commonwealth Games).

== Biography ==
Cooke was a member of the Belfast Health Studios and at the 1958 All-Ireland championships, he won the Senior Mr Ireland title.

Cooke represented the 1958 Northern Irish Team at the 1958 British Empire and Commonwealth Games in Cardiff, Wales, participating in the 75kg middleweight.

After the Games in November 1958, Cooke retained his middleweight title at the Irish Weightlifting Championships. In 1959 he finished runner-up in the Mr Great Britain competition and in June 1959, he left Belfast to take an appointment in Bermuda, where he would work as a physical training instructor in a prison.

A winner of his class at the Mr Universe in Montreal, he returned home to Belfast in June 1961. He had a long-time association with Buster McShane, one of Ireland's best known strongman.
