= Wilma Hunter =

Northern Irish swimmer

Personal information
- Nationality: British (Northern Irish)
- Born: C.1942

Sport
- Sport: Swimming
- Event: Breaststroke
- Club: Donegal SC

Wilma Hunter (c.1942) is a former swimmer from Northern Ireland, who represented Northern Ireland at the British Empire and Commonwealth Games (now Commonwealth Games).

== Biography ==
Hunter finished third in the 100 yards breaststroke at the 1956 Ulster Championships and won the junior title at the 1957 Irish nationals in a record breaking time.

She was a member of the Donegal Swimming Club in Belfast and specialised in the breaststroke.

Hunter represented the 1958 Northern Irish Team at the 1958 British Empire and Commonwealth Games in Cardiff, Wales, participating in the 220 yards breaststroke event.
