= Doreen Plews =

British fencer (1930–2025)

Personal information
- Nationality: British (Scottish)
- Born: 28 August 1930 South Shields, England
- Died: 17 January 2025 (aged 94) Shropshire, England

Sport
- Sport: Fencing
- Event: Foil
- Club: Chester Fencing Club

Doreen Evelyn Plews (later Powell; 28 August 1930 – 17 January 2025) was a fencer, who represented Scotland at the British Empire and Commonwealth Games (now Commonwealth Games).

== Biography ==
Plews was born on 28 August 1930 in South Shields, England, but lived in Newtonlea Avenue in Newton Mearns in Renfrewshire for many years. Plews represented the 1958 Scottish Team, at the 1958 British Empire and Commonwealth Games in Cardiff, Wales, where she participated in the individual foil.

In July 1950, Plews married John L. Powell in Shropshire.

In 1967, Plews was a member of the Chester Fencing Club and won their foil championship. She helped Chester win the A.F.A. Coaches Trophy in Glasgow during the same year.

In 1974 she was still competing for the club, in addition to being on the committee for them and in 1981 she became chairman.

Plews died in Shropshire on 17 January 2025, at the age of 95.
