= Ronald Brownbill =

English weightlifter (born 1932)

Personal information
- Nationality: British (English)
- Born: 1932

Sport
- Sport: Weightlifting
- Event: Bantamweight
- Club: Wallasey Athletic Club
Medal record
weightlifting
Representing England
British Empire & Commonwealth Games
Silver medal – second place	1958 Cardiff	-56Kg combined

Ronald Brownbill (born 1932) is an English former weightlifter.

== Biography ==
Brownbill won the 1950 eight-stone British Amateur Championships.

He represented the England team and won a silver medal in the bantamweight -56 Kg combined category at the 1958 British Empire and Commonwealth Games in Cardiff, Wales.

At the time of the Games, he was a member of the Wallasey Athletic Club and was an electrical engineer by trade.

By the start of 1962, he had won the British title five years running.
