= Danny Glackin =

Northern Irish swimmer

Personal information
- Nationality: British (Northern Irish)
- Born: c.1935 Wexford, Ireland

Sport
- Sport: Swimming
- Event: Freestyle
- Club: Victoria SC, Belfast; East End SC, Belfast

Daniel A. Glackin (c.1935) is a former swimmer and water polo player from Northern Ireland, who represented Northern Ireland at the British Empire and Commonwealth Games (now Commonwealth Games).

== Biography ==
In 1954, Glackin was a member of the Victoria Swimming Club in Belfast and played for their water polo team. He specialised in the freestyle and was the 1955 Irish quarter-mile champion.

On 3 June 1957, he moved from the Victoria Club to join East End Swimming Club in Belfast.

He represented the 1958 Northern Irish Team at the 1958 British Empire and Commonwealth Games in Cardiff, Wales, participating in the 110 yards freestyle and medley relay events.

He made the decision to retire from swimming after the August 1959 Irish Championships but ended up returning to his former club Victoria instead.
