= Tom Kawere =

Ugandan boxer (1927–2021)

Thomas Kawere
- Born: Thomas Nseremye Kawere; 1 June 1927
- Died: 5 December 2021 (aged 94)
- Resting place: Lubaga
- Citizenship: Uganda
- Education: Namilyago College; Loughborough College
- Occupation: Professional boxer
- Years active: 1945–1960 (as boxer); 1959–2021 (as coach)
- Organization: Uganda Boxing Federation
- Known for: First East African to win a medal in an international boxing tournament
- Spouse: Nampeera Kawere
- Children: 9
- Awards: Service to Country (2016)
- Honours: Silver medal at 1958 Commonwealth Games

Thomas Nseremye Kawere also known as Tom Kawere (1 June 1927 – 5 December 2021) was a Ugandan professional boxer and a former coach of The Uganda National Boxing Team which also known "The Bombers". He was the first Ugandan and East African to win a medal in an international boxing tournament, securing a silver medal at the Commonwealth games in 1958.

== Early life and education ==
Thomas Kawere was born on 1 June 1927. He was a grand child of Stanislas Mugwaanya who served as a chief in the Buganda Kingdom.

He attended secondary school at Namilyango College, where his engagement with boxing began in 1945. Despite being an all-rounder, doing well in football, cricket, and athletics, Kawere decided to focus on boxing after a cricket injury. He captained the Namilyango College boxing team from 1945 to 1949. He went on to Loughborough College to study physical education in the UK.

== Career ==
Kawere became boxer in Namilyago College in 1944 where he served as the school team captain from 1945 to 1949. Kawere started the Kampala Boxing Club.

Kawere participated in the 1958 Commonwealth games in Wales where he emerged as the winner for silver medal in the welterweight division. Between 1959 up to 1969, he was the head coach of the Uganda National boxing team called The Bombers and led Uganda to the 1960 Rome Olympics. As Uganda's national boxing coach from 1959, mentoring boxers like Ayub Kalule and John 'The Beast' Mugabi. During the 1960 Rome Olympics, he allowed a young Cassius Clay (later Muhammad Ali) to train with the Ugandan team, recognizing the benefits of this exchange for both parties involved. Kawere also coached Idi Amin Dada who won Uganda's heavyweight boxing title.

Kawere served as a clerk in 1950 at the Ministry of Public Relations and Social Welfare. Between 1960 and 1965, he served as a member of the Ugandan Olympic Committee. From 1960 to 1977, he worked as the sports officer at the Ministry of Culture and Community Development. Between 1963 and 1965, Kawere served as a member and treasurer of the Uganda Amateur Athletics Association and he served as Administrative secretary to the National Sports Council from 1977 to 1981.

In 1965, Kawere was the appointed the Uganda Boxing Association referee and judge. In 1962, he became the coach for Amateur Athletic Association in UK and in 1974, he became the International Boxing Association judge.

== Professional record ==
3 Bouts (50% by knockouts), 9 Rounds
| Result | Record | Opponent | Date | Result | Location |
| Loss | 2-0-0 | (South Africa) Joseph Greyling | July 25, 1958 | L-PTS | (New Zealand) Sophia Gardens, Pavilion Cardiff |
| Win | 1-2-0 | (Scotland) Bertie Scott | July 23, 1958 | W-TKO | (New Zealand) Sophia Gardens, Pavilion Cardiff |
| Win | Debut | (Nigeria) M Uzubu | July 22, 1958 | W-TKO | (New Zealand) Sophia Gardens, Pavilion Cardiff |

== Medals, awards and recognitions ==
- He won a bronze medal from Royal Life Saving Society in United Kingdom in 1962.
- On 29 July 2016, Kawere was awarded an accolade for his service contribution to the country and Namilyago College by Moses Magogo who is the FUFA president during the Namilyango College Old Boys Association inaugural dinner which took place at Protea Hotel in Kampala.

== Personal life and death ==
Kawere was married to Nampeera Kawere on 25 September 1953 and they had nine children. Kawere died on 5 December 2021 with 94 years at his home in Lubaga due to spinal cord complication which was sustained as a result of a boda boda accident which happened in 2017.

== See also ==
- Uganda at the Commonwealth Games
- List of Commonwealth Games medalists in boxing
- 1958 British Empire and Commonwealth Games
- George Oywello
