= Gordon Newman =

Welsh weightlifter

Personal information
- Nationality: British (Welsh)

Sport
- Sport: Weightlifting
- Event: Middleweight

Gordon Newman is a former weightlifter from Wales, who competed at the 1958 British Empire and Commonwealth Games (now Commonwealth Games).

== Biography ==
Newman from Bargoed, won the 1955 Welsh national title, and the 1957 title.

In March 1958, he participated in the Welsh Olympic Championships and Empire Games trials and was one of the 7 athletes (out of 26) that was short-listed for the Games.

Newman subsequently represented the 1958 Welsh team at the 1958 British Empire and Commonwealth Games in Cardiff, Wales, where he participated in the 75kg middleweight category.
