= Ann Nelson (swimmer) =

Northern Irish swimmer

Personal information
- Nationality: British (Northern Irish)
- Born: c.1944

Sport
- Sport: Swimming
- Event: Backstroke
- Club: East End SC, Belfast

Ann Nelson (c.1944) is a former swimmer from Northern Ireland, who represented Northern Ireland at the British Empire and Commonwealth Games (now Commonwealth Games).

== Biography ==
Nelson was a member of the East End Swimming Club in Belfast and specialised in the backstroke. She broke the Irish senior and junior 100 metres backstroke record in March 1958 and represented Ireland at international level.

She represented the 1958 Northern Irish Team at the 1958 British Empire and Commonwealth Games in Cardiff, Wales, participating in the 110 yards backstroke event.

In 1961, as a holder of five Irish and Ulster titles and four Irish records, Nelson was named Northern Ireland's swimmer of the year.
