= Jack Baillie =

Scottish swimmer

Personal information
- Nationality: British (Scotland)

Sport
- Sport: Swimming
- Event: Freestyle
- Club: Glasgow Univ; Renfrew Aqua SC

Jack D. Baillie is a former swimmer from Scotland, who represented Scotland at the British Empire and Commonwealth Games (now Commonwealth Games).

== Biography ==
Baillie was a member of the Renfrew Aqua Swimming Club and won two titles and set two records at the Scottish Universities championships in 1956 for Glasgow University.

In 1955, he won the 220 freestyle title and in 1957 won the 400 metres freestyle title at the Scottish championships. In August 1957 he represented Scotland at the Festival of Youth Games in Moscow.

He represented the 1958 Scottish swimming team at the 1958 British Empire and Commonwealth Games in Cardiff, Wales, participating in the 440 yards freestyle event.
