= John Wright (weightlifter) =

British weightlifter

Personal information
- Born: Scotland

Sport
- Sport: Weightlifting
- Event: Middleweight
- Club: Rosyth Physical Culture School

John Wright is a former weightlifter from Scotland, who represented Scotland at the British Empire and Commonwealth Games (now Commonwealth Games).

== Biography ==
Wright was from Rosyth and was based at the Rosyth Physical Culture School. Wright first competed in the Scottish Championships in 1957

He represented the Scottish Empire and Commonwealth Games team at the 1958 British Empire Games in Cardiff, Wales, participating in the middleweight category.

Wright went on to be the 1959 Scottish middleweight champion and represented Fife at regional level and won another Scottish middleweight title in 1961. He continued to represent Scotland at international level and in 1961 was in Scottish team for the international match against Wales.
