= John Cannon (weightlifter) =

British weightlifter

Sport
- Sport: Weightlifting
- Event: Bantamweight
- Club: Ayr Health & Strength Club

John Cannon is a former weightlifter from Scotland, who represented Scotland at the British Empire and Commonwealth Games (now Commonwealth Games).

== Biography ==
Cannon was a member of the Ayr Health and Strength Club. He represented the Scottish Empire and Commonwealth Games team at the 1958 British Empire Games in Cardiff, Wales, participating in the bantamweight category.

In 1958 Cannon retained his Scottish bantamweight title and continued to represent Scotland at international level and in 1961 was in Scottish team for the international match against Wales. Additionally, he participated in exhibition matches.
