= Bobby Kane =

Scottish boxer

Personal information
- Nationality: British (Scottish)

Sport
- Sport: Boxing
- Event: Light-welterweight
- Club: Greenock St Mungo ABC
Medal record
Representing Scotland
Commonwealth Games
Silver medal – second place	1958 Cardiff	light-welterweight

Robert Kane better known as Bobby Kane is a former Scottish boxer who won a silver medal at the Commonwealth Games.

== Biography ==
Kane was a member of the Greenock St Mungo ABC and in 1957 participated in the Festival of Youth in Moscow.

Kane was twice the ABA champion of Great Britain in 1958 and 1959.

He was selected for the 1958 Scottish team for the 1958 British Empire and Commonwealth Games in Cardiff, Wales, where he competed in the 63.5kg light-welterweight event and won the silver medal.

He turned professional in 1959 and boxed ten bouts.
