= Albert Meli =

Northern Irish swimmer

Personal information
- Nationality: British (Northern Irish)
- Born: c.1937

Sport
- Sport: Swimming
- Event: Backstroke
- Club: East End SC, Belfast

Albert Meli (20 March 1937 – 10 March 2004) is a former swimmer from Northern Ireland, who represented Northern Ireland at the British Empire and Commonwealth Games (now Commonwealth Games).

== Biography ==
Meli was a member of the East End Swimming Club in Belfast and specialised in the backstroke. He won the 1957 Irish 800 metres championship at the age of 20, while working as an electrical engineer with Harland and Wolff.

He represented the 1958 Northern Irish Team at the 1958 British Empire and Commonwealth Games in Cardiff, Wales, participating in the 110 yards backstroke and medley relay events.

In May 1960, he left Ireland for job on the continent as a crew member aboard a yacht.
