= Christine Tolland =

British fencer

Personal information
- Nationality: British (Scottish)
- Died: 1980

Sport
- Sport: Fencing
- Event: Foil
- Club: Glasgow Sword Club; Jard Fencing Club, Glasgow

Christine J. Tolland (–1980) was a fencer, who represented Scotland at the British Empire and Commonwealth Games (now Commonwealth Games).

== Biography ==
Tolland was a member of the Glasgow Sword Club.

Tolland represented the 1958 Scottish Team, at the 1958 British Empire and Commonwealth Games in Cardiff, Wales, where she participated in the individual foil. She was the 1959 Scottish foil champion.

In 1960, Tolland won the Ladies' Ford Cup for the fifth consecutive year. In 1967, she ran the Jard Fencing Club and was the secretary for the west section of the Scottish Amateur Fencing Union (AFU). By 1974, she was the honorary secretary of the AFU.

She died in 1980.
