= Allan Robinson =

British weightlifter

Personal information
- Nationality: British (English)
- Born: 19 June 1935 Blackburn, England
- Died: December 2010 (aged 75)
- Height: 157 cm (5 ft 2 in)
- Weight: 56 kg (123 lb)

Sport
- Sport: Weightlifting
- Event: Featherweight
- Club: Chorley

Allan J Robinson (19 June 1935 – December 2010), was a male weightlifter who competed for Great Britain at the 1960 Summer Olympics.

== Biography ==
Robinson was a body builder and won the 1955 Mr. Great Britain competition, he ran a gym in the Lancashire town of Blackburn with Darwen and was a plumber by trade.

He represented the England team and finished fifth in the -60 kg combined category at the 1958 British Empire and Commonwealth Games in Cardiff, Wales. His participation in the event nearly ended when he was initially disqualified from the Games before reinstatement. The disqualification came about because he had appeared on an ITV Adonis show which offered cash prizes and this jeopardised his amateur status.

At the 1960 Olympic Games in Rome, he finished in 18th place in the featherweight category.
