= Ken Laidlaw =

Scottish cyclist

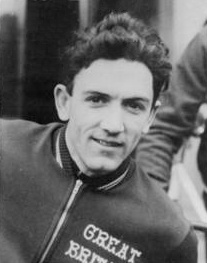
- Ken Laidlaw in 1960

Personal information
- Born: 16 March 1936 (age 90) Hawick, Scotland
- Height: 1.72 m (5 ft 8 in)
- Weight: 63 kg (139 lb)

Cycling career
- Sport: Cycling
- Discipline: Road
- Role: Rider

Amateur team
- Musselburgh CC

Professional teams
- 1961: Margnat – Rochet – Dunlop
- 1962: Margnat – Paloma

Major wins
- 1957 – Tour of Scotland

Thomas A. Kenneth Laidlaw (born 16 March 1936) is a retired Scottish professional cyclist. With Robert Millar, David Millar and Oscar Onley, he is one of only four Scots to finish the Tour de France. He is also one of the first British riders to finish the Tour.

== Amateur career ==
Laidlaw raced as an amateur in Scotland and 1957, he served with the 7th Royal Tank Regiment in Catterick and rode for the Army Cycle Union, when winning the Scottish Road Race title. Riding for Hawick, he won the Tour of Scotland in 1957

He represented the 1958 Scottish Team at the 1958 British Empire and Commonwealth Games in Cardiff, Wales, participating in one cycling program event; the road race Shortly after the games, Laidlaw tied for second place with Jimmy Williams in the Dunedin 50 miles time trial.

Laidlaw qualified for the 1960 Summer Olympics in Rome, and raced in two events. He finished in 53rd place in the men's road race. He also competed in the 100 km Men's Team Time Trial, finishing 14th.

== Professional career ==
Laidlaw raced the European pro circuit during his professional career between 1961 and 1962. In 1961 he rode for Margnat – Rochet – Dunlop, and in 1962 for Margnat – Paloma.

Laidlaw's most famous moment came in the 1961 Tour de France, when he led Stage 16 until about 7 km to go. The stage took in a climb from Luchon to the summit of the Superbagnères, an ascent of 4000 ft in 11 miles. For his effort he was awarded £145 for the most aggressive rider of the day award. The stage was won by Imerio Massignan who won the mountains classification in that year. Laidlaw finished the Tour in 65th place.

the pack begins the climb out of Luchon, Radio Tour announced; "attack by number 90….LaidLaw! He went past the pack, moving at a good rate with the French tri colour jerseys, and Anquetil in the race leader’s yellow jersey at the front……and out 100 yards ahead of them was the unmistakeable figure of Ken Laidlaw thrashing away for all he was worth"
sporting cyclist

== Post-cycling ==
Following disillusionment with professional cycling, Laidlaw moved to New York in 1964 to continue working as a carpenter and later spent many years living in Savannah, Georgia after his cycling career.

The Ken Laidlaw Sportive is a Cyclosportive named after the rider, held in his native Hawick in the Scottish Borders.
