= Jue Chin-shen =

Taiwanese weightlifter

Personal information
- Nationality: Taiwanese
- Born: 20 December 1938 (age 86); South Korea

Sport
- Sport: Weightlifting

Jue Chin-shen (born 20 December 1938) is a Taiwanese weightlifter. He competed in the men's middleweight event at the 1960 Summer Olympics.
