= Billy Hiatt =

Former boxer who competed for England

Personal information
- Nationality: British (English)
- Born: Second quarter 1947 Battersea, London, England

Sport
- Sport: Boxing
- Event: Light-welterweight
- Club: Battersea ABC

William "Billy" F. Hiatt (born 1947) is a male former boxer who competed for England.

== Boxing career ==
Hiatt won the 1966 Amateur Boxing Association British light-welterweight title, when boxing out of the Battersea ABC.

The A.B.A. success led him to being chosen for the 1966 British Empire and Commonwealth Games in Kingston, Jamaica, where he represented the England team in the 63.5 kg light-welterweight.

He continued to box for England throughout his career.
