= Ossie Higgins =

Welsh boxer

Personal information
- Nationality: Welsh / Irish
- Born: 19 January 1931 Dublin, Ireland
- Died: 26 December 2000 (aged 69) Newport, Glamorgan, Wales

Sport
- Sport: Boxing / Association football
- Event: Light heavyweight
- Club: Ebbw Vale Boxing Club; Aston Villa FC; Ipswich Town FC
Medal record
Representing (Wales)
Commonwealth Games
Silver medal – second place	1958 Cardiff	light-heavyweight

Augustine Robert Higgins (19 January 1931 – 26 December 2000) better known as Ossie Higgins was a Welsh/Irish boxer and footballer who won a silver medal at the Commonwealth Games.

== Biography ==
Higgins began boxing in 1946 but retired after boxing as a junior to get married. He was a carpenter's mate by trade and played football for Shamrock Rovers, Aston Villa and Ipswich Town from 1949 to 1953, although he did not earn a first team cap for Villa and only earned two caps for Ipswich.

He later resumed his boxing career and was a member of the Ebbw Vale Boxing Club, making his Welsh international debut against Denmark in January 1958. He won the 1958 Welsh ABA light-heavyweight championship.

He was selected for the 1958 Welsh team for the 1958 British Empire and Commonwealth Games in Cardiff, Wales, where he competed in the light-heavyweight category and won the silver medal. The Welsh boxing team secured six medals from ten weight classes.
