= Ernie Scally =

Scottish cyclist (1937–2024)

Personal information
- Nationality: British (Scotland)
- Born: Ernest Scally; 1937
- Died: 24 December 2024 (aged 87) Glasgow, Scotland

Sport
- Sport: Cycling
- Event(s): Track and Road
- Club: Army Cycle Union; Glasgow Nightingale CC

Ernest Scally (1937 – 24 December 2024) was a Scottish racing cyclist, who represented Scotland at the British Empire Games (now Commonwealth Games).

== Biography ==
Scally, born in 1937, was serving his National Service in the Army and riding for the Army Cycle Union when he won the 1958 Nomads 30 miles time trial. He was a member of the Glasgow Nightingale Cycling Club and won the 1958 Glasgow District Road Championship.

He won stage 2 of the Tour of Northern Ireland in 1959, defeating Sam Kerr into second place.

Scally represented the 1958 Scottish Team at the 1958 British Empire and Commonwealth Games in Cardiff, Wales, participating in two cycling program events; the scratch race and the road race

Scally died at Stobhill Hospital in Glasgow, on 24 December 2024, at the age of 87.
