= Weightlifting at the 1960 Summer Olympics – Men's 75 kg =

Weightlifting at the Olympics

Men's 75 kg at the Games of the XVII Olympiad
- Venue: Palazzetto dello Sport
- Date: 8 September 1960
- Competitors: 27 from 20 nations
- Winning total: 437.5 kg WR

Medalists
1st place, gold medalist(s)		Aleksandr Kurynov	Soviet Union
2nd place, silver medalist(s)		Tommy Kono	United States
3rd place, bronze medalist(s)		Győző Veres	Hungary

The men's 75 kg weightlifting competitions at the 1960 Summer Olympics in Rome took place on 8 September at the Palazzetto dello Sport. It was the ninth appearance of the middleweight class.

== Results ==
Rank	Name	Country	kg
1	Aleksandr Kurynov	Soviet Union	437.5
2	Tommy Kono	United States	427.5
3	Győző Veres	Hungary	405.0
4	Marcel Paterni	France	400.0
5	Krzysztof Beck	Poland	400.0
6	Mohamed Tehraniami	Iran	392.5
7	Go Yeong-chang	South Korea	385.0
8	Roland Lortz	United Team of Germany	382.5
9	Amer El-Hanafi	United Arab Republic	382.5
10	Lee Jong-sup	South Korea	380.0
11	Rolf Maier	France	375.0
12	Ivan Abadzhiev	Bulgaria	370.0
13	Mustapha Adnane	Morocco	365.0
14	Mohamed Mourtada	Lebanon	360.0
15	Carlos Caballero	Colombia	357.5
16	Harold Fraser	South Africa	347.5
17	Daryl Cohen	Australia	337.5
18	Georges Freiburghaus	Switzerland	332.5
19	Mohamed Miloud	Morocco	327.5
20	Mirza Adil	Sudan	290.0
AC	Mikhail Abadzhiev	Bulgaria	105.0
AC	Abdel Qader El-Touni	United Arab Republic	120.0
AC	Ko Bu-beng	Chinese Taipei	215.0
AC	Jue Chin-shen	Chinese Taipei	DNF
AC	Ambrosio Solorzano	Venezuela	DNF
AC	Blair Blenman	Great Britain	DNF
AC	Donald Bayley	Australia	DNF
