= Roland Lortz =

German weightlifter

Personal information
- Nationality: German
- Born: 12 May 1937; Darmstadt, Germany
- Died: 14 April 2007 (aged 69); Zimmern, Germany

Sport
- Sport: Weightlifting

Roland Lortz (12 May 1937 – 14 April 2007) was a German weightlifter. He competed in the men's middleweight event at the 1960 Summer Olympics.
