= Mohamed Miloud =

Moroccan weightlifter

Personal information
- Nationality: Moroccan
- Born: 1935 (age 89–90); Casablanca, Morocco

Sport
- Sport: Weightlifting

Mohamed Miloud (born 1935) is a Moroccan weightlifter. He competed in the men's middleweight event at the 1960 Summer Olympics.
