= Johnny Caiger =

Boxer who competed for England

Personal information
- Nationality: British (English)
- Born: 8 April 1939 Romford, England
- Died: March 2018 (aged 78) Weymouth, England

Sport
- Sport: Boxing
- Event: Middleweight
- Club: Monteagle ABC, London
Medal record
Boxing
Representing England
British Empire & Commonwealth Games
Bronze medal – third place	1958 Cardiff	-75 kg

John Edward Caiger (1939–2018), was a male boxer who competed for England.

== Biography ==
Caiger represented the England team during the boxing tournament at the 1958 British Empire and Commonwealth Games in the -75 Kg division and won a bronze medal.

He was the 1961 Amateur Boxing Association British middleweight champion, when boxing for the Army. He turned professional under Terry Lawless and later worked as the trainer for Fairburn House Boys Club in Canning Town.
