= Mohamed Mourtada =

Lebanese weightlifter (1930–1982)

Personal information
- Nationality: Lebanese
- Born: 18 March 1930 Ita Zoth, Lebanon
- Died: December 1982 (aged 52)

Sport
- Sport: Weightlifting

Mohamed Mourtada (18 March 1930 – December 1982) was a Lebanese weightlifter. He competed in the men's middleweight event at the 1960 Summer Olympics. Mourtada died in December 1982, at the age of 52.
