= Terry Milligan =

Northern Irish boxer (1930–2003)

Personal information
- Nationality: British (Northern Irish)
- Born: 7 March 1930 Belfast, Northern Ireland
- Died: 20 June 2003 (aged 73) Belfast, Northern Ireland

Sport
- Sport: Boxing
- Event: Middleweight
Medal record
Men's Boxing
Representing Northern Ireland
British Empire and Commonwealth Games
Gold medal – first place	1958 Cardiff	Middleweight

Terry Milligan (7 March 1930 – 20 June 2003) was a boxer from Northern Ireland who competed at the 1952 Summer Olympics in Helsinki, where he reached the quarter-finals.

== Biography ==
Milligan was born in Belfast, Northern Ireland and was a member of the Short and Harland Boxing Club of Belfast and won the 1951 Irish welterweight title.

In 1951 he won a bronze medal at the European Amateur Boxing Championships in Milan, in 1953 a silver medal at the European Amateur Boxing Championships in Warsaw.

He was selected for the 1958 Northern Irish team for the 1958 British Empire and Commonwealth Games in Cardiff, Wales, where he competed in the 75kg middleweight category and won the gold medal.

Terry Milligan had a wife and nine children.
