= Buster McShane =

Northern Irish weightlifter

Personal information
- Nationality: British (Northern Irish)
- Born: 26 July 1930
- Died: 24 April 1973 Belfast, Northern Ireland

Sport
- Sport: Weightlifting
- Event: Middleweight
- Club: Belfast

Robert Terence McShane better known as Buster McShane (26 July 1930 – 24 April 1973) was a coach, weightlifter and strongman from Northern Ireland, who represented Northern Ireland at the British Empire and Commonwealth Games (now Commonwealth Games).

== Biography ==
McShane served an apprenticeship with Short and Harlands as a fitter and was a member of the Belfast Health Studios, where he coached weightlifters including Billy Cooke.

In 1957, he was described as Ireland's best-ever weightlifter In 1961 he was also described as Ireland's best-known strongman.

McShane represented the 1962 Northern Irish Team at the 1962 British Empire and Commonwealth Games in Perth, Australia, participating in the 67.5kg lightweight category.

Mary Peters credits McShane as being her mentor for ten years and helping her career.

McShane died in on 24 April 1973, when his motor vehicle hit a wall at Holywood in Belfast.
