= Neville Tong =

English cyclist (1934–2019)

Personal information
- Nationality: British (English)
- Born: Fourth quarter 1934 Burton Constable, East Riding of Yorkshire, England
- Died: 15 June 2019 (aged 85)

Sport
- Sport: Cycling
- Club: Polytechnic CC
Medal record
Cycling
Representing England
British Empire & Commonwealth Games
Gold medal – first place	1958 Cardiff	1 Km time trial

Neville Tong (1934–15 June 2019) was an English cyclist.

== Cycling career ==
Tong represented the England team and won a gold medal in the 1 Km time trial at the 1958 British Empire and Commonwealth Games in Cardiff, Wales.

He won the Dundee grand Prix in 1956 and various trophies and medals for other events throughout the UK including both the British Cycling Federation and British grass track championships.

== Personal life ==
Neville was born in Burton Constable, East Riding of Yorkshire, but brought up in Winterton, Lincolnshire. His wife, whilst swimming was rescued from the Caribbean currents as she got into difficulty; Welshman Nick Dibble, 63 years of age at the time, swam out and risked his own life to save hers. Having set up and run a successful construction and roofing business, Tong retired in 2013 and spent his retirement living in Scotter with his wife Joan.

Tong died on 15 June 2019 from a heart attack after stopping during a bike ride.
