= Alistair McKenzie =

Scottish boxer

Personal information
- Nationality: British (Scottish)
- Born: 1937 Elgin, Moray, Scotland
- Died: 19 December 1992 (aged 54–55) Elgin, Moray, Scotland

Sport
- Sport: Boxing
- Event: Middleweight
- Club: Glasgow Police BC

Alistair Ingram McKenzie (1937 – 19 December 1992) was a Scottish boxer who competed at the Commonwealth Games.

== Biography ==
McKenzie was from Fochabers and started boxing at the Fochabers Recreation Club and was the North-East champion of Scotland in 1957.

Mckenzie had served in the Royal Air Force and was a building labourer but in 1958 applied to join the Glasgow Police Force. He was a Scottish international, Scottish Welterweight champion and a regular on amateur fights shown on television.

By May 1958 he had joined the police and was fighting for the Glasgow Police Boxing Club.

He was selected for the 1958 Scottish team for the 1958 British Empire and Commonwealth Games in Cardiff, Wales, where he competed in the middleweight event and lost to Robert Piau of Canada in the quarter-final round.
