= Roy Beaman =

Former boxer who competed for England

Personal information
- Nationality: British (English)
- Born: 12 July 1938 (age 88) Lambeth, London, England

Sport
- Sport: Boxing
- Event: Featherweight
- Club: Royal Air Force

Roy G. Beaman (born 1938), is a male former boxer who competed for England.

== Biography ==
Beaman represented the England team during the boxing tournament at the 1958 British Empire and Commonwealth Games in the -57 Kg division.

He made his professional debut on 4 May 1959 and fought in 24 fights until 1962.
