= Myrddin John =

Welsh weightlifter

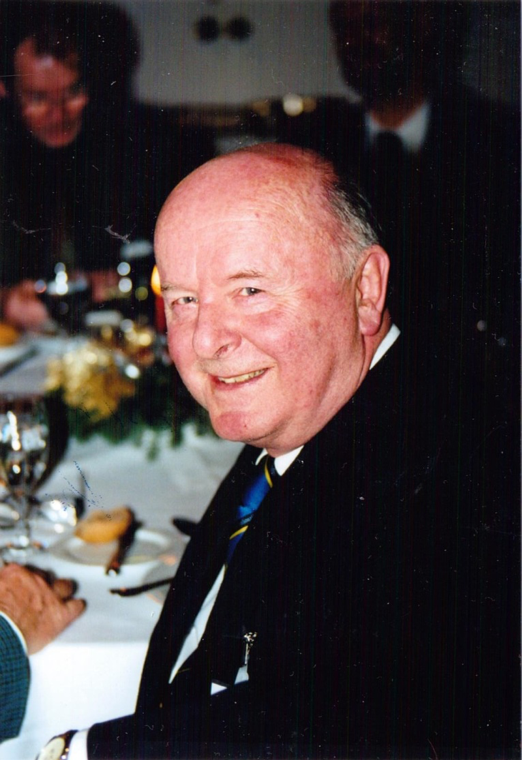

Personal information
- Nationality: British (Welsh)
- Born: 20 December 1933 Betws, Carmarthenshire, Wales
- Died: 22 December 2021

Sport
- Sport: Weightlifting
- Event: Bantamweight
- Club: Ammanford

William Thomas Myrddin John (born 20 December 1933 – 22 December 2021) was a weightlifter and sports administrator from Wales, who competed at the 1958 British Empire and Commonwealth Games (now Commonwealth Games).

== Biography ==
John was educated at Amman Valley Grammar School and Trinity College, Carmarthen and won the 1955 Welsh national title.

In March 1958, he participated in the Welsh Olympic Championships and Empire Games trials and was one of the seven athletes (out of 26) that was short-listed for the Games. He subsequently represented the 1958 Welsh team at the 1958 British Empire and Commonwealth Games in Cardiff, Wales, where he participated in the 56kg bantamweight category category.

From 1968, John went on to become the secretary and coach of the Welsh national team but in November 1973 was asked to resign following allegations that John had purchased anabolic steroids. However, he was then advised not to resign because he admitted that although he had experimented with the new drug in 1972, he had not given any to the athletes he was coaching. He went on to coach the Welsh team at the 1970 British Commonwealth Games in Scotland and was team manager at the 1978 Commonwealth Games in Canada.

In 1980, when he was warden of the Llandeilo Community Education Centre, he was awarded a sports medal of honour and in 1983 he was Chairman of the Commonwealth Games Council and received the MBE in the Queen's 1983 Birthday Honours. He was also Vice President of the World Weightlifting Federation.
