= George Drummond (boxer) =

Scottish boxer

Personal information
- Nationality: British (Scottish)
- Born: 1935 Scotland
- Died: December 2015 (aged 80) East Kilbride, Scotland

Sport
- Sport: Boxing
- Event: Featherweight
- Club: Woodside BC, Fife

George Drummond was a Scottish boxer who competed at the Commonwealth Games.

== Biography ==
Drummond spent his childhood in Fife but later moved to East Kilbride and in 1957 won a bronze medal for Scotland at the World Festival of Youth and Students in Moscow.

He was a member of the Woodside Boxing Club of Fife and represented Scotland at international level. Drummond also fought at bantamweight and became a boxing TV personality.

He was selected for the 1958 Scottish team for the 1958 British Empire and Commonwealth Games in Cardiff, Wales, where he competed in the featherweight event and lost to South African Gert Coetzee in the quarter-final round.

He would eventually complete 370 career fights and after retiring from boxing, worked as a physio and masseur at Dollan Baths.
