= Tommy Bache =

Former boxer who competed for England

Personal information
- Nationality: British (English)
- Born: 13 September 1938 (age 87) Liverpool, England

Sport
- Sport: Boxing
- Event: Flyweight
- Club: Golden Gloves, Liverpool
Medal record
Boxing
Representing England
British Empire & Commonwealth Games
Silver medal – second place	1958 Cardiff	-51 Kg

Thomas W. Bache (born 1938) is a former boxer who competed for England.

== Biography ==
Bache represented the England team during the boxing tournament at the 1958 British Empire and Commonwealth Games in Cardiff, Wales and won a silver medal in the -51 Kg division.

Bache made his professional debut on 24 March 1960 and fought in six fights until 1963.
