= Billy Good (swimmer) =

Scottish swimmer

Personal information
- Nationality: British (Scotland)
- Born: Scotland

Sport
- Sport: Swimming
- Event: Freestyle
- Club: University of Aberdeen

William Good is a former swimmer from Scotland, who represented Scotland at the British Empire and Commonwealth Games (now Commonwealth Games).

== Biography ==
Good attended Robert Gordon's College and swam for the Royal Air Force in 1957. He also swam for the University of Aberdeen and won the 400 metres freestyle at the 1958 Scottish Inter-Universities meet.

He represented the 1958 Scottish swimming team at the 1958 British Empire and Commonwealth Games in Cardiff, Wales, participating in the 1650 yards freestyle event.

Good was coached by Andy Robb.
