= Billy Orbin =

British weightlifter

Personal information
- Born: 30 September 1930 Motherwell, Scotland
- Died: 3 April 2023 Middlesbrough, England

Sport
- Sport: Weightlifting
- Event: Lightweight
- Club: Motherwell Y.M.C.A. WC

William "Billy" Orbin (30 September 1930 – 3 April 2023) was a weightlifter from Scotland, who represented Scotland at the British Empire and Commonwealth Games (now Commonwealth Games).

== Biography ==
Orbin lived in Vulcan Street, Motherwell and in 1952 was serving with the Royal Air Force in the South of England. However, his club where he conducted his weightlifting was the Motherwell Y.M.C.A. Weightlifting Club.

After finishing runner-up in the 1952 Scottish championships, he won the 1953 Scottish lightweight title. In June 1954 he broke five Irish records when competing in Dublin.

In 1956, he was living in Birmingham and woking as an electrician and had successfully won four consecutive Scottish titles from 1953 to 1956.

He moved to Stockton-on-Tees in Durham and in early 1958 married Doreen Brannen from Hartlepool and was then selected for the Scottish Empire and Commonwealth Games team at the 1958 British Empire Games in Cardiff, Wales, participating in the lightweight category.
