= Athletics at the 1958 British Empire and Commonwealth Games – Women's discus throw =

Women's discus throw at the Commonwealth Games

The women's discus throw event at the 1958 British Empire and Commonwealth Games was held on 26 July at the Cardiff Arms Park in Cardiff, Wales.

== Results ==
Rank	Name	Nationality	Result	Notes
1st place, gold medalist(s)	Suzanne Allday	England	150 ft 7 1/2 in (45.91 m)	
2nd place, silver medalist(s)	Jennifer Thompson	New Zealand	148 ft 7 in (45.29 m)	
3rd place, bronze medalist(s)	Val Sloper	New Zealand	147 ft 5 in (44.93 m)	
4	Marie Dupree	Canada	140 ft 10 in (42.93 m)	
5	Sylvia Needham	England	139 ft 6 1/2 in (42.53 m)	
6	Lois Jackman	Australia	134 ft 0 1/2 in (40.86 m)	
7	Anna Fick	South Africa	128 ft 2 1/2 in (39.08 m)	
8	Diana Will	Scotland	125 ft 4 1/2 in (38.21 m)	
9	Jacqueline Gelling	Canada	118 ft 1 in (35.99 m)	
10	Christine Charters	Scotland	114 ft 8 1/2 in (34.96 m)	
11	Toni Ireland	Scotland	108 ft 8 1/2 in (33.13 m)	
12	Edith Okoli	Nigeria	103 ft 0 1/2 in (31.41 m)	
	Maya Giri	England	NM	
