= William Bannon (boxer) =

Scottish boxer

Personal information
- Nationality: British (Scottish)

Sport
- Sport: Boxing
- Event: Light-heavyweight
- Club: Dundee Hawkhill ABC
Medal record
Representing Scotland
Commonwealth Games
Bronze medal – third place	1958 Cardiff	light-heavyweight

William Bannon also known as Bill Bannon or Willie Bannon is a former Scottish boxer who won a bronze medal at the Commonwealth Games.

== Biography ==
Bannon was a member of the Dundee Hawkhill Amateur Boxing Club and in 1956 reached the final of the Scottish Amateur light-heavyweight championship but lost when knocked out by Dave Mooney of Lanarkshire Welfare.

At the 1957 Scottish Championships, Bannon was disqualified from the semi-finals of the heavyweight class following a head clash with Harry McCann, a match seen by millions on television. A coalworker by trade, he earned a fearsome reputation and earned the nickname Wild Bill.

He was selected for the 1958 Scottish team for the 1958 British Empire and Commonwealth Games in Cardiff, Wales, where he competed in the light-heavyweight event and won the bronze medal.
