= Deirdre Wilson (swimmer) =

Northern Irish swimmer

Personal information
- Nationality: British (Northern Irish)
- Born: c.1938

Sport
- Sport: Swimming
- Event: Freestyle
- Club: Bangor SC

Deirdre E. Wilson (c.1938) is a former swimmer from Northern Ireland, who represented Northern Ireland at the British Empire and Commonwealth Games (now Commonwealth Games).

== Biography ==
Wilson won the 1952 Irish junior title in a record breaking time. She was a member of the Bangor Swimming Club in Bangor, County Down and retained her junior ttle in 1953.

She specialised in the freestyle and was the 1956 Irish champion. In 1957 she won the 100 yards and 440 yards Ulster titles.

Wilson represented the 1958 Northern Irish Team at the 1958 British Empire and Commonwealth Games in Cardiff, Wales, participating in the 100 yards and 440 yards freestyle events.
