= Manny Santos (weightlifter) =

Australian weightlifter (1935–2020)

Personal information
- Nationality: Australian
- Born: 30 January 1935 Sydney, Australia
- Died: 21 June 2020 (aged 85) Sydney, Australia

Sport
- Sport: Weightlifting
Medal record
Weightlifting
Representing Australia
British Empire and Commonwealth Games
Gold medal – first place	1958 Cardiff	Middle Heavyweight

Manoel Fredrick Santos (30 January 1935 – 21 June 2020) was an Australian weightlifter. A middle-heavyweight lifter, he competed at the 1956 Summer Olympics in Melbourne and the 1960 Summer Olympics in Rome.
