= Leonard Treganowan =

Australian weightlifter (1931–1988)

Personal information
- Nationality: Australian
- Born: 14 June 1931
- Died: 21 February 1988 (aged 56) Victoria, Australia

Sport
- Sport: Weightlifting
Medal record
Weightlifting
Representing Australia
British Empire (and Commonwealth) Games
Bronze medal – third place	1958 Cardiff	Men's Middle Heavyweight

Leonard Frederick Treganowan (14 June 1931 – 21 February 1988) was an Australian weightlifter. He competed in the men's middle heavyweight event at the 1956 Summer Olympics.
