= Queen's University Belfast Boat Club =

Rowing club from Northern Ireland

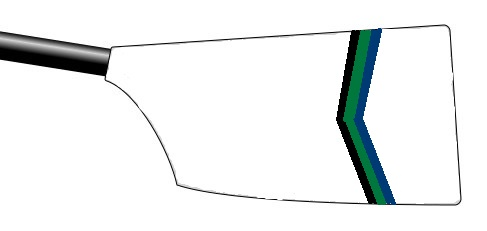
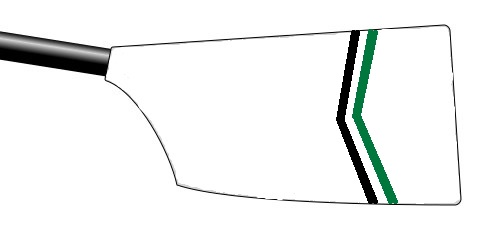
- Location: Stranmillis, Belfast, Northern Ireland
- Home water: River Lagan
- Founded: 1931; 95 years ago
- Key people: Murphy Stearns (Men’s Captain) Leah McDonald (Ladies’ Captain)
- Affiliations: Rowing Ireland boat code ZQU (men) ZQL (women)
- Website: Queens University Boat Club

Events
- Queen's Regatta, Irish Universities Boat Race

Queen's University Belfast Boat Club (QUBBC) is the boat club of Queen's University Belfast in Belfast, Northern Ireland. It is based on the River Lagan in the Stranmillis area of the city, about 10 minutes' walk from the university.

== History ==
=== 1931–1951 ===
The Queen's University of Belfast Boat Club was founded in 1931, due to the work of four founding members: J.W. Rigby, D.B. McNeill, F. Maunsell and J.F. Doggart. Towards the end of January 1932 the newly formed club signed an agreement with Belfast Commercial Boat Club for accommodation that was its home until 1951. Membership rose from a dozen or so in 1932 to a maximum of 65 by 1937.

The club competed regularly in regattas in Ireland and Scotland. Rowing was maintained at a low level throughout the war years; however, after the war the club really started making an impact, and under the vigorous captaincy of F.J. Boyle (1944/45), it won the Wylie Cup (Irish University Championships) for the first time. Success continued under H.F. Jackson in 1945/46 when the club retained the Wylie Cup, and next year went to Henley Royal Regatta for the first time. In 1947 a Queen's four won the Metropolitan Challenge Cup (the 'Blue Riband' of Irish Four rowing) and many other trophies.

In 1951 the university provided a "temporary wooden structure" on the site of the present clubhouse, which was officially opened during the captaincy of John Gorman, when the club went to the Putney Head of the River and came 13th.

=== 1952–1967 ===
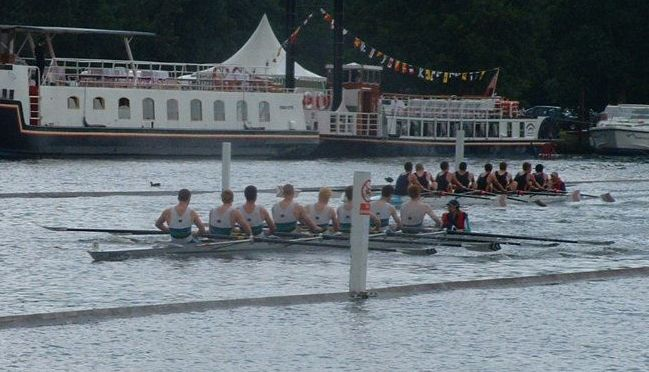
Queen's racing at Henley Royal Regatta in 2003

From their newly established clubhouse, Queen's came to be a dominant force in Irish rowing and a major club in the university. Under John Alexander's captaincy, Queen's won the Wylie Cup and the Irish Senior Championship (the 'Big Pot') in 1952. The club won the 'Big Pot' five more times, in 1953, 1956, 1957, 1959 and 1962. The victory in 1957 was remarkable because it was won by a 'second' Queen's crew, as the Championships were held during Henley Royal Regatta.

In 1958 the Queen's Senior Crew represented Northern Ireland in the Commonwealth Games Regatta instead of attending the National Championships. That crew reached the third round of the Thames Cup at Henley, as did the crew in 1959. Other divisions of the club did well, as the splendid record of the Wylie Cup shows: the only years Queen's failed to win the cup were 1958, 1959, 1961 and 1966. Queen's Junior (now Intermediate) crews won the National Championships in 1958, 1960, and 1962 and the Maiden (Novice) crews in 1953, 1955, 1961, 1963, 1967 and 1969.

Club membership was usually about 100 at the beginning of each year, and frequently 4 or 5 'eights' rowed right through the season from October to July. The social side of life was not neglected, and the Boat Club Dinner and Formal Dance were among the highlights of the Queen's year. In 1967 Queen's held a regatta on the Lagan; this became an annual event and eventually transferred to its present venue at Castlewellan Lake.

=== 1968–1983 ===
Despite the success which Queen's had enjoyed for the previous fifteen years, there were developments in Irish rowing which left these years rather bereft of trophies for the club. Yet there were still great efforts made at Queen's, such as in 1976 when the Senior crew reached the final of the Ladies' Challenge Plate at Henley.

Also in 1976, the "temporary wooden structure" was at last replaced with a proper clubhouse. J.W.F. Boyd was captain when the club's new home was opened, and three 'eights' made up of past captains and members rowed a short race to celebrate the occasion.

After graduating, many members rowed for Lady Victoria Boat Club or the newly founded Belfast Rowing Club. John Armstrong, Captain 1982-83, won both the Open and Lightweight Championships in 1983.

== Recent years ==
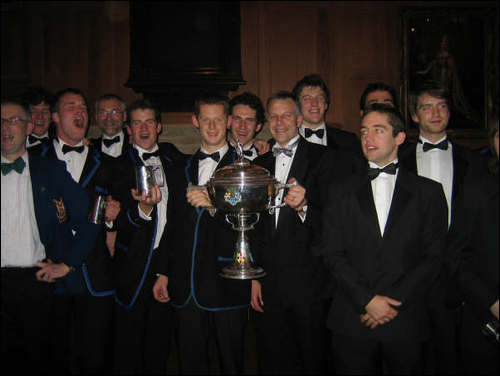
The 2005 Irish Championship winning Queen's crew receiving the IARU Trophy. Holding the cup is QUB Vice Chancellor Peter Gregson.

Queen's have achieved much success in recent years. In 1996 they won both the Wylie Cup and the Intermediate 8 Championship. In 2001 a Queen's coxless pair of James Cleland and Jonny Hill won the Irish championships and followed it up the next season by representing Ireland in the Home internationals and Northern Ireland in the Commonwealth Rowing Championships. In 2003 Queen's raced in the Head of the Charles in Boston for the first time, entering the championship and college 8's races. In 2005 Queen's, under the captaincy of Chris Wylie, won the Intermediate 8's championship of Ireland ahead of Neptune R.C, and also won the University 8's event at Amsterdam International Regatta beating Orca R.C into second place.

In the 2008/2009 season QUBBC appointed its first professional coach who delivered immediate success with Queen's winning the Novice and Intermediate Championships of Ireland as well as narrowly missing out on the Senior Championship. They also won the Wylie Cup for the first time in 13 years and produced a strong showing at Henley Royal Regatta, equalling the course record to the barrier as they competed in the Temple Challenge Cup. 2010 saw Queen's win the Senior VIII and Senior 4X in the BUCS Regatta and again fall to a narrow defeat in the Senior Championship of Ireland.

== Boat race ==
2004 saw the first running of the Irish Universities Boat Race, held on the Lagan between Queen's University Belfast and Trinity College, Dublin. The race is made to mirror the Oxford-Cambridge Boat Race which is held annually on the River Thames.

In 2004 the race was held over 3,800 metres, in 2005 it was shortened to 2,700 metres, and in 2006 it was shortened again to 2,000 metres. Dr Robert Gamble of Queen's University Belfast in 2006 remarked, "this year’s race will be over the shorter distance of 1 mile and 550 yards, and is the same distance as the most prestigious rowing event in the calendar, Henley Royal Regatta."

The inaugural race was won by Trinity, beating Queen's by four lengths. The 2005 race was a thrilling contest, with the Queen's crew holding off Trinity in the final stages to win by a length. Trinity took the 2006, 2007 and 2008 races. The 2009 race was won easily by QUBBC, with Queen's crossing the finish line as Trinity passed under Governor's Bridge. In 2010 Queen's Senior VIII again were victorious, beating Trinity by an even greater margin than in 2009. The series then stood at 4-3 in favour of Trinity.

In 2011 Trinity declined the challenge to race, due to the fact that in did not want to show their hand in advance of the upcoming Irish championships, where Queen's were one of their main rivals. With Trinity failing to send a team UUC Cork accepted the challenge to race on the 4 June 2011. Queen's were again successful, bringing their total wins to 4 out of 9 races. Subsequently, Queen's went on to beat Trinity at the 2011 Irish championships, winning the men’s Inter VIII.

In 2013, again UCC Cork came up to challenge for the boat race. The Queen's Senior 8 went on to win.

== Notable members ==
- Richard Archibald – member of the Irish Lightweight Coxless 4 in the 2004 and 2008 Olympic Games
- John Armstrong – 1997 World Rowing Championships, Bronze medal lightweight quad
- Ross Corrigan - Paris Olympics 2024
- Mick Desmond- Former rowing coach
- Phil Doyle - Tokyo Olympics 2020
- Ian Kennedy - Montreal Olympics 1976
- Sam McKeown - British, European, and World university champion
- Konan Pazzaia - U23 World champion
- Ciaran Purdy - U23 European and World champion
- Miles Taylor - Irish U23 worlds silver
- Nathan Timoney - Paris Olympics 2024

== See also ==
- List of British and Irish varsity matches
- University rowing in the United Kingdom
