= Blair Blenman =

British weightlifter (1932–1999)

Personal information
- Nationality: British
- Born: 23 November 1932; Bridgetown, Barbados
- Died: October 1999; London, England

Sport
- Sport: Weightlifting

Blair Blenman (23 November 1932 – October 1999) was a British weightlifter. He competed in the men's middleweight event at the 1960 Summer Olympics.
