= Diana Will =

Scottish athlete

Personal information
- Nationality: British (Scottish)
- Born: 27 May 1937

Sport
- Sport: Athletics
- Event: Discus throw
- Club: Aberdeen University AC

Diana Beatrice Robertson Will (born 27 May 1937) is a former track and field athlete from Scotland who competed at the 1958 British Empire and Commonwealth Games (now Commonwealth Games).

== Biography ==
Will studied geography at the University of Aberdeen and was a member of their athletic club. In 1957 she lived at 132 South Anderson Drive in Aberdeen. Specialising in the discus, she was the Scottish Universities champion. At the 1958 Scottish national championships at New Meadowbank, Will won the discus title.

She represented the Scottish Empire and Commonwealth Games team at the 1958 British Empire Games in Cardiff, Wales, participating in one event, the discus throw event.

In 1959 she was the first woman to be awarded the Royal Scottish Geographical Medal and after university attended Aberdeen College of Further Education for her teacher training.

Will won another Scottish title in 1960 and married John Marnoch Legge in 1962.
