= Donald Bayley =

Australian weightlifter

Personal information
- Full name: Donald William Bayley
- Nationality: Australian
- Born: 9 October 1931; Maryborough, Queensland, Australia
- Died: 5 May 1983 (aged 51)

Sport
- Sport: Weightlifting

Donald William "Don" Bayley (9 October 1931 – 5 May 1983) was an Australian weightlifter. He competed in the men's middleweight event at the 1960 Summer Olympics.
