= Jim Jordan (boxer) =

Northern Irish boxer

Personal information
- Nationality: British (Northern Irish)
- Born: 1936 Belfast, Northern Ireland
- Died: 24 November 2024 (aged 88)

Sport
- Sport: Boxing
- Event: Lightweight
- Club: St. George's ABC, Belfast
Medal record
Representing Northern Ireland
Commonwealth Games
| Silver medal – second place | 1958 Cardiff | lightweight |

James Jordan (1936 – 24 November 2024) was a Northern Irish boxer who won a silver medal at the Commonwealth Games.

== Biography ==
Jordan was a member of the St. George's ABC of Belfast and was the Ulster amateur lightweight champion in 1957.

He was selected for the 1958 Northern Irish team for the 1958 British Empire and Commonwealth Games in Cardiff, Wales, where he competed in the 60kg lightweight category and won the silver medal.

In 1958, Jordan turned professional and boxed 11 bouts from 1958 to 1962.

After retiring from fighting, Jordan helped prepare boxers with Belfast trainer Eddie Shaw for Barney Eastwood.
