= Ronnie Jones (swimmer) =

Northern Irish swimmer

Personal information
- Nationality: British (Northern Irish)
- Born: c. 1940
- Died: 2025 Belfast

Sport
- Sport: Swimming
- Event: Freestyle
- Club: East End SC, Belfast

Ronnie Jones (c. 1940–2025) was a swimmer and water polo player from Northern Ireland, who represented Northern Ireland at the British Empire and Commonwealth Games (now Commonwealth Games).

== Biography ==
Jones was a member of the East End Swimming Club in Belfast and specialised in the freestyle. In 1957, he won the 440 yards Ulster freestyle title and was runner-up at the 1957 Irish 800 metres championship.

He represented the 1958 Northern Irish Team at the 1958 British Empire and Commonwealth Games in Cardiff, Wales, participating in the freestyle events.

In 1959, he finished runner-up in both the 220 and 440 yards Irish freestyle championships, two titles that he won in 1958. He later swam for the Neptune Swimming Club.
