= Freddie Owen (cricketer) =

English cricketer

Personal information
- Full name: Frederick Gerard Owen
- Born: 25 September 1985 (age 41); Chester, Cheshire, England
- Batting: Right-handed

Domestic team information
- Years: Team
- 2006–2010: Cambridge University
- 2008: Cambridge UCCE

Career statistics
Competition	First-class
Matches	5
Runs scored	174
Batting average	19.33
100s/50s	–/1
Top score	50
Catches/stumpings	–/–
- Source: Cricinfo, 17 August 2020

Frederick 'Freddie' Gerard Owen (born 25 September 1985) is an English former first-class cricketer.

Owen was born at Chester in September 1985. He was educated at King's School, Chester before going up to Corpus Christi College, Cambridge. While studying at Cambridge, he played first-class cricket for Cambridge University from 2006–10, making four appearances against Oxford University in The University Match. He scored 116 runs in his four matches against Oxford, averaging 16.57 and making a high score of 42. In addition to playing for Cambridge University, he also made a single first-class appearance for Cambridge UCCE against Warwickshire at Fenner's in 2008, (Note: Cambridge UCCE differed from Cambridge University Cricket Club in that it was open to students at Anglia Ruskin University, whereas Cambridge University Cricket Club is exclusively for students of the constituent colleges of the University of Cambridge.) recording a half century in the match with a score of exactly 50.
