= Peter Lavery =

Northern Irish boxer

Personal information
- Nationality: British (Northern Irish)
- Born: 28 February 1937 Belfast, Northern Ireland
- Died: 26 October 2020 (aged 83)

Sport
- Sport: Boxing
- Event: Flyweight
- Club: St John Bosco ABC, Belfast
Medal record
Representing Northern Ireland
Commonwealth Games
Bronze medal – third place	1958 Cardiff	flyweight

Peter Lavery (28 February 1937 – 26 October 2020) was a Northern Irish boxer who won a bronze medal at the Commonwealth Games.

== Biography ==
Lavery was a member of the St John Bosco ABC of Belfast and was the Ulster amateur flyweight champion in 1957.

He was selected for the 1958 Northern Irish team for the 1958 British Empire and Commonwealth Games in Cardiff, Wales, where he competed in the 51kg flyweight category and won the bronze medal.

In 1959, Lavery turned professional and boxed 33 bouts from 1959 to 1967.
