= Jean Taylor (swimmer) =

Scottish swimmer

Personal information
- Nationality: British (Scotland)
- Born: Scotland

Sport
- Sport: Swimming
- Event: Freestyle
- Club: Criterion SC, Aberdeen

Jean A. Taylor is a former swimmer from Scotland, who represented Scotland at the British Empire and Commonwealth Games (now Commonwealth Games).

== Biography ==
Taylor was a member of the Criterion Swimming Club in Aberdeen. She won the 1957 Northern District title, which led to her selection for the Scottish national team. She retained her title in 1958.

She represented the 1958 Scottish swimming team at the 1958 British Empire and Commonwealth Games in Cardiff, Wales, participating in the 440 yards freestyle event.

She was coached by Andy Robb.
