= Frederick Owen =

Irish Anglican priest

Frederick Owen (Dean of Leighlin) (1800–1895) was an Irish Anglican priest.

The son of The Rev Roger Carmichael Owen, Rector of Camolin, he was educated at Trinity College, Dublin. He was ordained deacon in 1825 and priest in 1826. He was rector of Aghold from 1857 to 1890; and Dean of Leighlin from then until his death.
