= Stuart Slack =

Personal information
- Full name: Stuart George SLACK
- Born: 25 January 1935 Douglas, Isle of Man
- Died: 5 December 1998

Cycling career
- Sport: Cycling
- Discipline: Road
- Role: Rider

Amateur team
- Manx Viking Wheelers/Ellan Vannin CC
Medal record
Cycling
Representing Isle of Man
British Empire & Commonwealth Games
| Bronze medal – third place | 1958 Cardiff | road race |

Stuart Slack (25 January 1935 – 5 December 1998) was a racing cyclist from the Isle of Man. He was part of the first ever Manx team to participate in the British Empire and Commonwealth Games.

Slack participated in the 1958 British Empire and Commonwealth Games, taking part in the road cycling event. He finished third in the event, arriving in a five-man group nearly three minutes behind the race winner, Ray Booty winning a Bronze Medal after a photo-finish. In 2011, this result was described as being "against all expectations" and was credited with increasing the popularity of cycling in the Isle of Man.

Later in his life, Slack published two books about the island. He was also a noted Manx musician and Isle of Man folk songwriter. This includes the popular folk song ‘The Laxey Wheel’ (1957). A number of different recordings of Stuart Slack's folk songs were banned by the local commercial radio station Manx Radio for being too "risqué."

Since his death in 1998 there is an annual cycle event in his memory.

In 2002, the Isle of Man Post Office issued a set of postage stamps for the 2002 Commonwealth Games in Manchester including a 22 pence stamp depicting the photo-finish of Stuart Slack's third-place finish in the Men's Cycling Road race at the 1958 Empire Games.

== Published works ==
- Slack, Stuart (2003). Manx Milestones. The Manx Experience. ISBN 978-1873120583.
- Slack, Stuart (1996). Streets of Douglas – Old and New. The Manx Experience. ISBN 978-1873120279.

== Discography ==
- Wreck of the Herring Fleet
- The Laxey Wheel
- Bulgham Bombshell
- The Foxdale Miner
- Laxey Girls are the Boys
- Ride the Rails
- Give Me the Bus Fare to Laxey
- Illiam Done
- Ballamodha Dragoons
- Effort
- My Little Home at Port-e-Chee
- The Port Erin Breakwater Disaster

== 45 rpm single ==
- Isle of Man TT Hall of Fame (David Collister) / The Laxey Wheel Song (Stuart Slack) David Collister/Athol Moore Manx Radio Recordings (c.1972) Hillary Productions
- Mannin Folk – Mannin Folk Sing / Track 1. The Laxey Wheel Song (Stuart Slack) Kelly Recordings (1976)
- Give Me The Bus Fare to Laxey (Stuart Slack) / Smugglers Lullaby (Traditional) Mike Williams/Laury Kermode – Kelly Recordings
