= Daryl Cohen =

Australian weightlifter

Personal information
- Nationality: Australian
- Born: 12 July 1935 Melbourne, Australia
- Died: 4 March 2016 (aged 80)

Sport
- Sport: Weightlifting

Daryl Godfrey Cohen (12 July 1935 – 4 March 2016) was an Australian weightlifter. He competed in the men's middleweight event at the 1960 Summer Olympics.
