= Roger Pleace =

Welsh boxer

Personal information
- Nationality: British (Welsh)
- Born: 1933 Tiger Bay, Cardiff, Wales
- Died: 2010 (aged 76)

Sport
- Sport: Boxing
- Event: Heavyweight
- Club: Roath Youth BC; Cardiff Gas BC
Medal record
Representing (Wales)
Commonwealth Games
Bronze medal – third place	1958 Cardiff	heavyweight

Roger Pleace (1933 – 2010) was a Welsh boxer who won a bronze medal at the Commonwealth Games.

== Biography ==
Pleace, born in Tiger Bay, Cardiff, spent his childhood in the docks and began boxing aged 12. He won the schoolboy and youth national titles in 1945 and 1947 before winning the 1956 and 1958 Welsh ABA light-heavyweight championships.

He was selected for the 1958 Welsh team for the 1958 British Empire and Commonwealth Games in Cardiff, Wales, where he competed in the heavyweight category and won the bronze medal. The Welsh boxing team secured six medals from ten weight classes.

After he retired from fighting, he coached his younger brother Dennis and worked in the shipyards as a boiler maker. He emigrated to South Africa for four years in the 1970s but returned to Cardiff and Llandaff, where he ran a number of pubs. He also opened two Cardiff gymnasiums with his father.
