= Northern Ireland at the 1958 British Empire and Commonwealth Games =

- CG code: NIR
- CGA: Northern Ireland Commonwealth Games Council
- Website: nicgc.org

in Cardiff, Wales
- Medals Ranked 12th: Gold 1 Silver 1 Bronze 3 Total 5

British Empire and Commonwealth Games appearances
- 1934; 1938; 1950; 1954; 1958; 1962; 1966; 1970; 1974; 1978; 1982; 1986; 1990; 1994; 1998; 2002; 2006; 2010; 2014; 2018; 2022; 2026; 2030

Other related appearances
- Ireland (1930)

Northern Ireland at the 1958 British Empire and Commonwealth Games (abbreviated NIR) was the fourth time that the nation had participated at the Games following appearances in 1934, 1938 and 1954.

The Games were held in Cardiff, Wales, from 18 to 26 July 1958. Northern Ireland finished 12th in the medal table with one gold medal, one silver and three bronze medals, of which all five came in the Boxing.

== Medals ==
=== Gold ===
- Terry Milligan (boxing)

=== Silver ===
- Jim Jordan (boxing)

=== Bronze ===
- Dickie Hanna (boxing)
- Peter Lavery (boxing)
- John McClory (boxing)

== Team ==
=== Athletics ===
Men

Athlete	Events	Club	Medals
Tom Cairns	long jump, triple jump	Albert Foundry AC	
Ronnie Chambers	100y, 220y, 4×110 relay	Short and Harland AC	
Mark Cumming	440y hurdles	Queen's Univ AC	
Jack Dawson	marathon	Winnington AC, Northwich	
Billy Dundas	440y	Royal Ulster Constabulary AC	
Gordon Hamilton	100y, long jump, 4×110 relay	Queen's Univ AC	
John Henning	marathon	Duncairn Nomads, Belfast	
Billy McCue	3 miles	Royal Ulster Constabulary AC	
Dick Miller	javelin throw	Reading AC	
Des Price	120y hurdles	Queen's Univ AC	
Colin Shillington	880y, 1 mile	Willowfield Harriers	
Peter Street	100y, 220y, 4×110 relay	East Antrim Harriers	
Jimmy Todd	marathon	East Antrim Harriers	
Paddy Toner	100y, 220y, 4×110 relay	Albert Foundry AC	

Women

Athlete	Events	Club	Medals
Thelma Hopkins	high jump, long jump, 4×110 relay	Queen's Univ AC	
Mary Peters	high jump, shot put, 4×110 relay	Ballymena AC	
Bridget Robinson	javelin throw, 4×110 relay	Belfast High School	

=== Boxing ===
Athlete	Events	Club	Medals
Dickie Hanna	54kg bantamweight	Lisburn BC	Bronze medal
Jim Jordan	60kg lightweight	St. George's BC, Belfast	Silver medal
Peter Lavery	51kg flyweight	St John Bosco, Belfast	Bronze medal
John McClory	57kg featherweight	Holy Family BC, Belfast	Bronze medal
Terry Milligan	75kg middleweight	Short and Harland BC, Belfast	Gold medal

=== Cycling ===
Athlete	Events	Club	Medals
Eamon Burns	road race	St. Gabriel's C.C., Belfast	
Jim Darragh	scratch, sprint, time trial	Fallowfield, Manchester	
Leo Feeney	scratch, sprint, time trial	Abbey C.C., Belfast	
Séamus Herron	road race	Northern C.C., Belfast	
Sam Kerr	road race	Ballymena R.C.	
Martin McKay	sprint, time trial	Maryland Wheelers, Belfast	
Jim Maguire	road race	Windsor C.C., Belfast	
Tommy Talbot	scratch, pursuit	East Tyrone C.C., Cookstown	

=== Fencing ===
Men

Athlete	Events	Club	Medals
Bob Thompson	foil, sabre	Belfast Fencing Club	

Women

Athlete	Events	Club	Medals
Brenda Kenyon	foil	Belfast Fencing Club	

=== Lawn bowls ===
Athlete	Events	Club	Medals
George Best	fours/rinks	Willowfield BC	
Gerry Crossey	fours/rinks	Falls BC	
Roy Fulton	singles	Coleraine BC	
Tom Henry	fours/rinks	Londonderry BC	
William Rosbotham	pairs	Portadown BC	
Percy Watson	pairs	Cavehill BC	
Jack Webb	fours/rinks	Musgrave BC	

=== Rowing ===
Athlete	Events	Club	Medals
Mike Armstrong	eight	Queen's University Belfast BC	
Derek Campbell	eight	Queen's University Belfast BC	
Robin Davidson	eight	Queen's University Belfast BC	
Des Gray	eight (cox)	Queen's University Belfast BC	
Gordon Gray	eight	Queen's University Belfast BC	
Norman Gray	eight	Queen's University Belfast BC	
Hugh Nesbitt-Porter	eight	Queen's University Belfast BC	
Robert Swann	eight	Queen's University Belfast BC	
Michael Thomas	eight	Queen's University Belfast BC	

=== Swimming ===
Men

Athlete	Events	Club	Medals
David Dunseath	220y breaststroke, medley relay	Queen's Univ and Bangor SC	
Danny Glackin	110y freestyle, medley relay	East End, Belfast	
Ronnie Jones	440y, 1650y freestyle	East End, Belfast	
Albert Meli	110y backstroke, medley relay	East End, Belfast	

Women

Athlete	Events	Club	Medals
Wilma Hunter	220y breaststroke	Donegal SC	
Ann Nelson	110y backstroke	East End, Belfast	
Deirdre Wilson	110y, 440y freestyle	Bangor SC	

=== Weightlifting ===
Athlete	Events	Club	Medals
Billy Cooke	75kg middleweight	Belfast	
Sammy Dalzell	56kg bantamweight	Vikings, Short and Harland	
Terry Pelan	67.5kg lightweight	Belfast	
