= Tommy McGuinness (boxer) =

Scottish boxer

Personal information
- Nationality: British (Scottish)
- Born: 21 July 1937 Craigneuk, Scotland
- Died: 9 February 2015 (aged 77)

Sport
- Sport: Boxing
- Events: Light-middleweight; Welterweight
- Club: Lanarkshire Welfare ABC; Sparta, Edinburgh

Tommy McGuinness (21 July 1937 – 9 February 2015) was a Scottish boxer who competed at the Commonwealth Games.

== Biography ==
McGuinness, born in Craigneuk, Scotland, started boxing at the Wishaw Priory Amateur Boxing before he joined the Lanarkshire Welfare ABC. A bricklayer by trade, he became a popular TV boxing star during the 1950s and 1960s.

While serving his national service with the Royal Scots in Benghazi, Libya, McGuinness and fellow boxer John McDermott formed a boxing club for the regiment.

He also boxed for the Sparta Club, was Scottish light-welterweight champion and boxed for Scotland in the 1957 European championships.

He was selected for the 1958 Scottish team for the 1958 British Empire and Commonwealth Games in Cardiff, Wales, where he competed in the light-middleweight event and lost to Welshman Bill Brown in the quarter-final round.

After the Games, he remained amateur, spurning the professional ranks.
