= Dickie Hanna (boxer) =

Northern Irish boxer

Personal information
- Nationality: British (Northern Irish)
- Born: 1939

Sport
- Sport: Boxing
- Event: Bantamweight
- Club: Lisburn BC
Medal record
Representing Northern Ireland
Commonwealth Games
Bronze medal – third place	1958 Cardiff	bantamweight

Dickie Hanna (born 1939) is a Northern Irish former boxer who won a bronze medal at the Commonwealth Games.

== Biography ==
Hanna was a member of the Lisburn Boxing Club and won the County Antrim bantamweight title in 1957. He turned down offers to go professional so that he could compete at the 1958 British Empire and Commonwealth Games in Cardiff, Wales.

He was subsequently selected for the 1958 Northern Irish team where he competed in the 54kg bantamweight category and won the bronze medal.

In 1959, Hanna turned professional and boxed 7 bouts from 1960 to 1963.
