= Warwick Dalton =

New Zealand cyclist (born 1937)

Personal information
- Born: 19 February 1937 (age 89) Ōtāhuhu, New Zealand

Cycling career
- Sport: Cycling
Medal record
Representing NZL
Men's cycling
British Empire and Commonwealth Games
Bronze medal – third place	1958 Cardiff	1 km time trial
Bronze medal – third place	1958 Cardiff	Individual pursuit

Warwick Dashwood Hirtzel Dalton (born 19 February 1937) is a former racing cyclist from New Zealand.

At the 1958 British Empire and Commonwealth Games he won the bronze medal in both the men's 1 km time trial and individual pursuit.

He competed at two Olympics, in Melbourne in 1956 and Rome in 1960, with his best result of 7th place in the 1 km time trial at Melbourne.

He won the Australian national road race title in 1963.
