= Freddie Owen (boxer) =

Scottish boxer

Personal information
- Nationality: British (Scottish)

Sport
- Sport: Boxing
- Event: Bantamweight
- Club: Dennistoun Youth Club, Glasgow
Medal record
Representing Scotland
Commonwealth Games
Bronze medal – third place	1958 Cardiff	bantamweight

Alfred Owen better known as Freddie Owen is a former Scottish boxer who won a bronze medal at the Commonwealth Games.

== Biography ==
Owen was a member of the Dennistoun Youth Club of Glasgow.

A butcher by trade, he lost to Welshman Howard Winstone in the final of the ABA Bnatamweight Championship at Wembley in 1958. He was subsequently selected for the 1958 Scottish team for the 1958 British Empire and Commonwealth Games in Cardiff, Wales, where he competed in the 54kg bantamweight event and won the bronze medal.
