= Stuart Pearson (boxer) =

Boxer who competed for England

Personal information
- Nationality: British (English)
- Born: 7 June 1934
- Died: 7 July 2015 (aged 81) Branton, South Yorkshire

Sport
- Sport: Boxing
- Event: Light middleweight
- Club: Doncaster
Medal record
Boxing
Representing England
British Empire & Commonwealth Games
| Silver medal – second place | 1958 Cardiff | -71 Kg |

Stuart Charles Pearson (1934–2015), was a male boxer who competed for England.

== Biography ==
Pearson represented the England team during the boxing tournament at the 1958 British Empire and Commonwealth Games in Cardiff, Wales and won a silver medal in the -71 Kg division.

Pearson won the 1958 and 1959 Amateur Boxing Association British light-middleweight title, when boxing out of the Doncaster Plant Works ABC.
