= Shettleston Harriers =

Scottish athletics club

- Founded: 1904
- Ground: Crownpoint Sports Complex
- Location: 183 Crownpoint Road, Glasgow G40 2AL
- Coordinates: 55.853374°N 4.221649°W
- Website: official website

Shettleston Harriers is a Scottish athletics club based in Glasgow, Scotland and is affiliated to Scottish Athletics. The club is based at the Crownpoint Sports Complex and train on Tuesdays and Thursdays.

== History ==
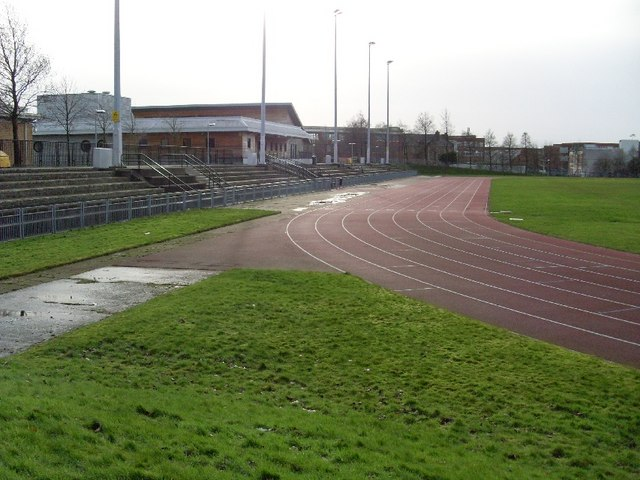
The Crownpoint Sports Arena in 2008

The club was founded in 1904, with the first president being Donald McColl, the secretary was Bob Nicol and the treasurer was John Howieson. It is worth noting however that John Howieson previously raced under a club name Shettleston Harriers before 1904.

The club's first Olympian was Lachie Stewart at the 1972 Summer Olympics in Munich.

== Notable athletes ==
=== Olympians ===
Athlete	Events	Games	Medals/Ref
Lachie Stewart	10,000m	1972	
Cameron Sharp	100m, 200m, relay	1980	
Chris Bennett	hammer throw	2016	

- Scottish unless stated

=== Commonwealth Games ===
Athlete	Events	Games	Medals/Ref
Tom Riddell	880 yards	1930	
Cathie Jackson	100y, 220y, 440y & 660y relays	1934	Bronze medal
David Young	Discus throw, shot put	1938	Silver medal
Joe McGhee	Marathon	1954	Gold medal
Graham Everett	880y, 1 mile	1958	
Hugo Fox	marathon	1958	
