= Harry Webber =

South African weightlifter

Personal information
- Nationality: South African
- Born: 21 April 1936; Pietermaritzburg, South Africa
- Died: 3 December 2013 (aged 77); Bloemfontein, South Africa

Sport
- Sport: Weightlifting

Harry Webber (21 April 1936 – 3 December 2013) was a South African weightlifter. He competed in the men's lightweight event at the 1960 Summer Olympics.
