= Frank Brazier =

Australian cyclist (1934–2021)

Personal information
- Born: 24 February 1934 Sydney, Australia
- Died: 10 May 2021 (aged 87)

Cycling career
- Sport: Cycling
Medal record
Men's cycling
Representing Australia
British Empire (and Commonwealth) Games
Silver medal – second place	1958 Vancouver	Men's Road Race

Frank Brazier (24 February 1934 – 10 May 2021) was a racing cyclist from Australia. He won a silver medal in the Road Race at the 1958 British Empire and Commonwealth Games at Cardiff. He competed in the men's 4000m Team Pursuit at the 1956 Summer Olympics and 1960 Summer Olympics, as well as the Team Time Trial and Road Race in 1960.

Brazier set the fastest time in the amateur Goulburn to Sydney Classic in 1962 run from Goulburn to Bankstown.
