= Jackie Brown (Scottish boxer) =

Scottish boxer (1935–2020)

Personal information
- Born: 2 March 1935 Edinburgh, Scotland
- Died: 12 January 2020 (aged 84) Sydney, New South Wales, Australia
- Weight: Flyweight

Boxing career
- Stance: Orthodox

Boxing record
- Total fights: 45
- Wins: 33
- Win by KO: 11
- Losses: 10
- Draws: 1
- No contests: 0
Medal record
Representing Scotland
Commonwealth Games
Gold medal – first place	1958 Cardiff	Flyweight

Jackie Brown (2 March 1935 – 12 January 2020) was a Scottish flyweight boxer who was a British and Commonwealth flyweight champion. He was born in Edinburgh, Scotland.

== Amateur career ==
Brown won the 1958 Amateur Boxing Association British flyweight title, when boxing out of the Leith Victoria ABC.

== Professional career ==
Brown had his first professional fight on 16 October 1958, in Paisley, defeating Mark Quinn in the third round on a technical knockout. He won his first fifteen fights before losing two in succession, to Derek Lloyd and Freddie Gilroy.

In October 1961, he defeated the young Walter McGowan in only his third fight, winning on points over eight rounds in Paisley. In his next fight, in February 1962, he fought for the vacant British flyweight title. The fight was in Birmingham against Brian Cartwright, and Brown won on points over fifteen rounds.

In December 1962, he fought for the vacant Commonwealth flyweight title, against Orizu Obilaso, of Nigeria. Brown was knocked down in the second round but went on to win on points. In May 1963, he defended both his flyweight titles, against Walter McGowan, whom he had previously defeated. The fight was in Paisley, and Brown was knocked out in the twelfth round, losing both his titles. Henceforth, Brown fought as a bantamweight, and held the Scottish area bantamweight title for a while.

His last fight was in October 1966, when he was stopped in the second round against George Bowes, in Newcastle.

== See also ==
- List of British flyweight boxing champions
