= Dick McTaggart =

Scottish boxer (1935–2025)

Dick McTaggart MBE
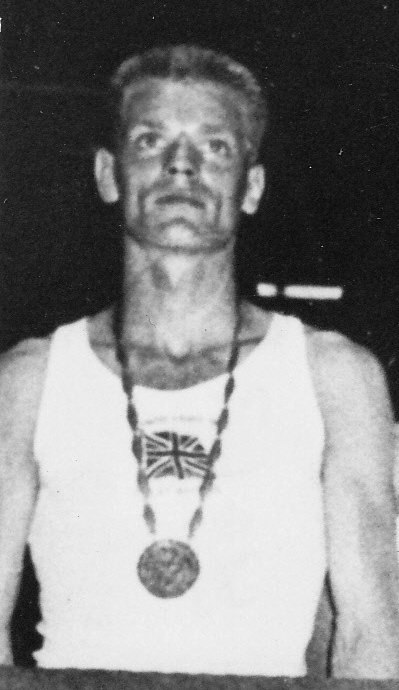
- McTaggart at the 1960 Olympics

Personal information
- Full name: Richard McTaggart
- Nationality: Scottish
- Born: 15 October 1935 Dundee, Scotland
- Died: 9 March 2025 (aged 89)
- Height: 175 cm (5 ft 9 in)
- Spouse: Doreen Cochran (1966–2025; his death)

Sport
- Sport: Boxing
- Club: Royal Air Force; Dundee Boxing Club
Medal record
Representing Great Britain
Olympic Games
Gold medal – first place	1956 Melbourne	Lightweight
Bronze medal – third place	1960 Rome	Lightweight
Representing Scotland
Commonwealth Games
Gold medal – first place	1958 Cardiff	Lightweight
Silver medal – second place	1962 Perth	Light welterweight
European Amateur Championships
Gold medal – first place	1961 Belgrade	Lightweight

Richard McTaggart, MBE (15 October 1935 – 9 March 2025) was a Scottish amateur boxer who was Olympic lightweight champion in 1956. In 1960, he won bronze in the same category. In 1956, he received the Val Barker Trophy for best boxing style at the Olympics. At the 1964 Olympics, McTaggart moved to the light-welterweight category but lost in the third bout to the eventual winner Jerzy Kulej. McTaggart won the British ABA title in 1956, 1958, 1960, 1963 and 1965, and retired with a record of 610 wins out of 634 bouts.

He was appointed Member of the Order of the British Empire (MBE) in the 1985 Birthday Honours for services to amateur boxing in Scotland.

In retirement, McTaggart worked as a boxing coach and prepared the Scottish team to the 1986 and 1990 Commonwealth Games. In 2002, he was inducted into the Scottish Sports Hall of Fame. His four brothers were also amateur boxers.

McTaggart died of complications from dementia on 9 March 2025, at the age of 89. At the time of his death, McTaggart had been living with the disease for nearly two years.

== Achievements ==
Year	Competition	Location	Position	Event
1954	ABA Championships	London, England	2nd	Featherweight
1956	ABA Championships	London, England	1st	Lightweight
1956	Olympic Games	Melbourne, Australia	1st	Lightweight
1958	ABA Championships	London, England	1st	Lightweight
1958	Commonwealth Games	Cardiff, Wales	1st	Lightweight
1960	Olympic Games	Rome, Italy	3rd	Lightweight
1961	European Amateur Championships	Belgrade, Serbia	1st	Lightweight
1961	IABA Golden Jubilee Tournament	Dublin, Ireland	1st	Lightweight
1962	Commonwealth Games	Perth, Western Australia	2nd	Light welterweight
1962	ABA Championships	London, England	2nd	Light welterweight
1963	ABA Championships	London, England	1st	Light welterweight
1964	ABA Championships	London, England	3rd	Light welterweight
1965	ABA Championships	London, England	1st	Light welterweight

== 1956 Olympic results ==
- Last 32: bye
- Last 16: defeated Chandrasena Jayasuriya (Ceylon) by decision
- Quarter-final: defeated Andre Vairolatto (France) by decision
- Semi-final: defeated: Anatoly Lagetko (Soviet Union) by decision
- Final: defeated Harry Kurschat (West Germany) by decision (won gold medal)

== Awards and honours ==
- Order of the British Empire – Member (MBE)
- Member of the International Boxing Hall of Fame
- Member of the Scottish Sports Hall of Fame
- Val Barker Trophy (1956)
- Lifetime Achievement Award - Team Scotland Sports Awards
