= Cycling at the 1958 British Empire and Commonwealth Games =

- Venue: Maindy Stadium, Cardiff; Ogmore-by-Sea
- Dates: 18 to 26 July 1958

Cycling at the 1958 British Empire and Commonwealth Games was the fifth appearance of Cycling at the Commonwealth Games. The events were held in Cardiff, Wales, from 18 to 26 July 1958.

The track events took place at Maindy Stadium, while the road race course was a 120 miles loop around Ogmore-by-Sea.

England topped the cycling medal table with three gold medals.

== Medal table ==
* Host nation (Wales)

Medals won by nation with totals, ranked by number of golds—sortable
Rank	Nation	Gold	Silver	Bronze	Total
1	England	3	2	1	6
2	Australia	2	2	0	4
3	New Zealand	0	1	2	3
4	Isle of Man	0	0	1	1
4	Wales*	0	0	1	1
6	Canada	0	0	0	0
6	Ceylon	0	0	0	0
6	Jersey	0	0	0	0
6	Kenya	0	0	0	0
6	Northern Ireland	0	0	0	0
6	Pakistan	0	0	0	0
6	Scotland	0	0	0	0
6	South Africa	0	0	0	0
6	Southern Rhodesia	0	0	0	0
6	Trinidad and Tobago	0	0	0	0
Totals (15 entries)		5	5	5	15

== Medal winners ==
Event	Gold	Silver	Bronze
Time trial	Neville Tong (ENG)	Warren Scarfe (AUS)	Warwick Dalton (NZL)
Sprint	Dick Ploog (AUS)	Karl Barton (ENG)	Lloyd Binch (ENG)
Pursuit	Norman Sheil (ENG)	Tom Simpson (ENG)	Warwick Dalton (NZL)
10 miles Scratch	Ian Browne (AUS)	Warren Johnston (NZL)	Don Skene (WAL)
Road race	Ray Booty (ENG)	Frank Brazier (AUS)	Stuart Slack (IOM)

== See also ==
- List of Commonwealth Games medallists in cycling
