= List of Commonwealth Games medallists in rowing =

This is the complete list of Commonwealth Games medallists in rowing from 1930 to 1986.

== Men's ==
=== Single sculls ===
Games	Gold		Silver		Bronze	
1930	Bobby Pearce (AUS)	8:04	Jack Beresford (ENG)		Fred Bradley (ENG)	
1938	Herb Turner (AUS)	8:24	Peter Jackson (ENG)		Bob Smith (NZL)	
1950	Mervyn Wood (AUS)	7:46.8	Tony Rowe (ENG)	7:54.0	(South Africa) Ian Stephen (SAF)	8:04.0
1954	Don Rowlands (NZL)	00:08:28	Sidney Rand (ENG)	00:08:43	Bob Williams (CAN)	00:08:51
1958	Stuart Mackenzie (AUS)	00:07:20	James Hill (NZL)	00:07:24	Russell Carver (ENG)	00:07:27
1962	James Hill (NZL)	00:07:40	Bill Barry (ENG)	00:07:45	Ian Tutty (AUS)	00:07:49
1986	Steve Redgrave (ENG)	00:07:28	Richard Powell (AUS)	00:07:33	Eric Verdonk (NZL)	00:07:39

=== Double sculls ===
Games	Gold		Silver		Bronze	
1930	Elswood Bole & Bob Richards (CAN)	7:48	none awarded		none awarded	
1938	Cecil Pearce & William Bradley (AUS)	7:29.4	Jack Offer & Dick Offer (ENG)		Gus Jackson & Bob Smith (NZL)	
1950	Mervyn Wood & Murray Riley (AUS)	7:22	Joe Schneider & Des Simonson (NZL)	7:32	Ken Tinegate & Jack Brown (ENG)	7:39
1954	Mervyn Wood & Murray Riley (AUS)	00:07:55	Bob Parker & Reg Douglas (NZL)	00:08:05	Donald Guest & Lawrence Stephan (CAN)	00:08:29
1958	Mike Spracklen & Geoffrey Baker (ENG)	00:06:54	Mervyn Wood & Stuart Mackenzie (AUS)	00:07:01	Norm Suckling & James Hill (NZL)	+0.75 lgths
1962	George Justicz & Nicholas Birkmyre (ENG)	00:06:52	Peter Watkinson & Murray Watkinson (NZL)	00:06:54	Barclay Wade & Graeme Squires (AUS)	00:07:01
1986	Bruce Ford & Pat Walter (CAN)	00:06:19	Paul Reedy & Brenton Terrell (AUS)	00:06:21	Carl Smith & Allan Whitwell (ENG)	00:06:34

=== Coxless pairs ===
Games	Gold		Silver		Bronze	
1950	Wal Lambert and Jack Webster (AUS)	7:58	David Gould and Humphrey Gould (NZL)	8:10	none awarded	
1954	Bob Parker & Reg Douglas (NZL)	00:08:24	Tom Christie & Nicholas Clack (ENG)	00:08:24	David Anderson & Geoff Williamson (AUS)	00:08:30
1958	Bob Parker & Reg Douglas (NZL)	00:07:11	Jonathan Hall & Stewart Douglas-Mann (ENG)	00:07:14	Stephen Roll & Kevyn Webb (AUS)	00:07:33
1962	Stewart Farquharson & David Lee Nicholson (ENG)	00:07:04	Graham Lawrence & Murray Lawrence (NZL)	00:07:08	Roger Ninham & William Hatfield (AUS)	00:07:10
1986	Andy Holmes & Steve Redgrave (ENG)	00:06:40	Barrie Mabbott & Ian Wright (NZL)	00:06:43	Ewan Pearson & David Riches (SCO)	00:06:43

=== Coxless fours ===
Games	Gold		Silver		Bronze	
1930	Francis Fitzwilliams; Arthur Harby; Hugh Edwards; Humphrey Boardman (ENG)	7:05	J. Gayner; J. Fleming; O.G. Bellew; Henry Pelham (CAN)	+2 lgths	Berry Johnson; Vic Olsson; Alex Ross; Charles Saunders (NZL)	
1958	Roger Pope; Keith Shackell; David Young; Creighton Redman (ENG)	00:06:34	Glen Smith; Malcolm Turnbull; Richard McClure; John Madden (CAN)	00:06:39	David Edwards; John Fage; David Prichard; John Edwards (WAL)	00:06:48
1962	Christopher Davidge; Michael Clay; John Beveridge; John Tilbury (ENG)	00:06:31	David Edwards; Jeremy Luke; Richard Luke; John Edwards (WAL)	00:06:32	Eldon Worobieff; Thomas Gray; Thomas Stokes; Ray McIntosh (CAN)	00:06:35
1986	Grant Main; Kevin Neufeld; Paul Steele; Pat Turner (CAN)	00:06:01	Andrew Stevenson; Shane O'Brien; Neil Gibson; Don Symon (NZL)	00:06:01	Graham Faultless; Richard Ireland; Mostyn Field; Humphry Hatton (ENG)	00:06:06

=== Coxed fours ===
Games	Gold		Silver		Bronze	
1930	New Zealand; Mick Brough; Jack Macdonald; Ben Waters; Bert Sandos; Arthur Eastwood	8:02	Canada; B.L. Gales; R.S. Evans; J.A. Butler; H.R. McCuaig; A. Miles	+2 lgths	British Guiana; J.I. Matthews; F.O. Gomes; B.P. Bagley; E.M. Gonsalves; J. Jardine	
1938	Australia; Don Fraser; Gordon Freeth; Harry Kerr; Jack Fisher; Stewart Elder	7:16.8	New Zealand; Albert Hope; George Burns; John Rigby; Ken Boswell; Jim Clayton	+1.25 lgths	Canada; Donald Davis; James Temple; James MacDonald; Kenneth Jaggard; Max Winkler	+0.75 lgths
1950	New Zealand; Ted Johnson; John O'Brien; Bill James; Bill Carroll; Colin Johnstone	7:17.2	Australia; Leslie Montgomery; Erwin Elder; Cecil Winkworth; Kenneth Gee; Kevin Fox	7:24.0	none awarded	
1954	Australia; Lionel Robberds; David Anderson; Peter Evatt; Geoff Williamson; Mervyn Wood	00:07:58	New Zealand; Bruce Culpan; Kerry Ashby; Murray Ashby; Bill Tinnock; Stanley Callagher	00:08:04	England; Geoffrey Page; Roderick Macmillan; Alastair Davidson; Maurice Legg; David Glynne-Jones	00:08:05
1958	England; Colin Porter; John Vigurs; Simon Crosse; Michael Beresford; Richard Gabriel	00:06:46	Canada; Donald Arnold; Walter D'Hondt; David Helliwell; Lawrence Stapleton; Sohen Biln	00:06:53	Australia; Mick Allan; Ralfe Currall; Kevin Evans; Lionel Robberds; Roland Waddington	NTT
1962	New Zealand; Winston Stephens; Keith Heselwood; Hugh Smedley; George Paterson; Doug Pulman	00:06:48	Australia; David Ramage; Derek Norwood; David Caithness; David John; Phillip Sarah	00:06:49	England; John Russell; Richard Knight; John Vigurs; Colin Porter; Michael Howard-Johnston	00:07:05
1986	England; Martin Cross; Adam Clift; Andy Holmes; Steve Redgrave; Adrian Ellison	00:06:08	New Zealand; Nigel Atherfold; Chris White; Greg Johnston; Bruce Holden; Andrew Bird	00:06:10	Australia; Mark Doyle; James Galloway; Mike McKay; James Tomkins; Dale Caterson	00:06:11

=== Eights ===
Games	Gold		Silver		Bronze	
1930	England; Arthur Harby; Edgar Howitt; Francis Fitzwilliams; Humphrey Boardman; Hugh Edwards; Justin Brown; Geoffrey Crawford; Roger Close-Brooks; Terence O'Brien	6:37	New Zealand; Arthur Eastwood; Bert Sandos; Charles Saunders; Ben Waters; Mick Brough; Rangi Thompson; John Gilby; Jack Macdonald; Vic Olsson	+0.75 lgths	Canada; Albert Taylor; Don Boal; Earl Eastwood; Harry Fry; Joseph Zabinsky; Joseph Bowkes; Les MacDonald; William Moore; William Thoburn	+4 lgths
1938	England; Basil Beazley; Desmond Kingsford; John Sturrock; John Burrough; John Turnbull; Peter Jackson; Rhodes Hambridge; Tim Turner; William Reeve	6:29	Australia; Joe Gould; Alfred Gregory; Edward Bromley; Frank le Souef; Gordon Yewers; Richard Paramor; William Thomas; Bill Dixon; Doug Bowden	+0.75 lgths	New Zealand; Gus Jackson; Cyril Stiles; Rangi Thompson; Howard Benge; John Charters; Leslie Pithie; Oswald Denison; James Gould; William Stodart	+2 lgths
1950	Australia; Alan Brown; Bruce Goswell; Edward Pain; Eric Longley; James Barnes; Peter Holmes; Phil Cayzer; Bob Tinning; Ross Selman	6:27	New Zealand; Bruce Culpan; Donald Adam; Don Rowlands; Edwin Smith; Grahame Jarratt; Kerry Ashby; Murray Ashby; Thomas Engel; William Tinnock	6:27.5	England; Tony Butcher; Hank Rushmere; Michael Lapage; Patrick Bradley; Peter de Giles; Peter Kirkpatrick; Dickie Burnell; Bill Windham; Jack Dearlove	6:40
1954	Canada; Daryl MacDonald; Glen Smith; Herman Zloklikovits; Ken Drummond; Lawrence West; Ray Sierpina; Robert Wilson; Thomas Toynbee; Thomas Harris	00:06:59	England; Alastair Davidson; Alan Watson; David Glynne-Jones; Geoffrey Page; John Pope; Joe Eldeen; M.G.C. Savage; Maurice Legg; Roderick Macmillan	00:07:11	none awarded	
1958	Canada; Archibald MacKinnon; Donald Arnold; Wayne Pretty; Glen Mervyn; Walter D'Hondt; Lorne Loomer; Robert Wilson; Sohen Biln; Bill McKerlich	00:05:51	Australia; Bruce Evans; Mick Allan; Kenneth Railton; Kevin Evans; Lionel Robberds; Neville Clinton; Ralph Currall; Roland Waddington; Victor Schweikert	00:05:56	England; Tony Hancox; Don Elliot; Dennis Mount; Hilali Wober; John A. Stephenson; Felix Badcock; J. P. M. Thomson; Dick Workman; Raymond Penney	00:06:10
1962	Australia; Charles Lehman; David Palfreyman; Dushan Stankovich; Graeme McCall; Ian Douglas; Martin Tomanovits; Paul Guest; Terry Davies; Walter Howell	00:05:53	New Zealand; Alistair Dryden; Alan Grey; Christian Larsen; Colin Cordes; Darien Boswell; Alan Webster; Louis Lobel; Leslie Arthur; Robert Page	00:05:54	England; Colin Porter; Christopher Davidge; John Beveridge; Michael Howard-Johnston; John Russell; John Vigurs; John Tilbury; Richard Knight; Michael Clay	00:06:09
1986	Australia; Andrew Cooper; Dale Caterson; Ion Popa; James Tomkins; James Galloway; Malcolm Batten; Mark Doyle; Mike McKay; Stephen Evans	00:05:44	England; John Garrett; John Maxey; Jonathan Spencer-Jones; Mark Buckingham; Patrick Broughton; Richard Stanhope; Stephen Peel; Terence Dillon; Vaughan Thomas	00:05:46	New Zealand; Mike Burrell; Neil Gibson; Andy Hay; Barrie Mabbott; Shane O'Brien; Andrew Stevenson; Don Symon; Carl Vincent; Ian Wright	00:05:48

=== Lightweight single sculls ===
Games	Gold		Silver		Bronze	
1986	Australia; Peter Antonie	00:07:16	Canada; Peter Tattersall	00:07:27	England; Carl Smith	00:07:27

=== Lightweight coxless fours ===
Games	Gold		Silver		Bronze	
1986	England; Christopher Bates; Peter Haining; Neil Staite; Stuart Forbes	00:06:26	Australia; Simon Cook; Brian Digby; Merrick Howes; Joseph Joyce	00:06:28	Canada; Dave Henry; Brian Peaker; Bob Thomas; Ryan Tierney	00:06:36

== Women's ==
=== Single sculls ===
Games	Gold		Silver		Bronze	
1986	Stephanie Foster (NZL)	00:07:43	Lisa Wright (CAN)	00:07:49	Gillian Bond (ENG)	00:07:53

=== Double sculls ===
Games	Gold		Silver		Bronze	
1986	New Zealand; Stephanie Foster; Robin Clarke	00:07:22	Canada; Heather Clarke; Lisa Robertson	00:07:49	England; Diane Prince; Claire Parker	00:07:55

=== Coxless pairs ===
Games	Gold		Silver		Bronze	
1986	Canada; Kathryn Barr; Andrea Schreiner	00:07:35	England; Pauline Bird; Flo Johnston	00:07:42	Australia; Catherine Hall; Alison Smith	00:07:53

=== Coxed fours ===
Games	Gold		Silver		Bronze	
1986	Canada; Christine Clarke; Tricia Smith; Lesley Thompson; Jane Tregunno; Jenny Walinga	00:06:50	Australia; Deborah Bassett; Susan Chapman-Popa; Robyn Grey-Gardner; Marilyn Kidd; Kaylynn Fry	00:06:54	England; Joanne Gough; Ann Callaway; Kate Holroyd; Trish Reid; Alison Norrish	00:07:06

=== Eights ===
Games	Gold		Silver		Bronze	
1986	Australia; Annelies Voorthuis; Deborah Bassett; Kaylynn Fry; Margot Foster; Marilyn Kidd; Robyn Grey-Gardner; Susan Chapman-Popa; Urszula Kay; Vicki Spooner	00:06:44	England; Alison Bonner; Alison Norrish; Ann Callaway; Flo Johnston; Joanne Gough; Kate Holroyd; Kate Grose; Trish Reid; Pauline Bird	00:06:46	Canada; Angela Schneider; Brenda Taylor; Carla Pace; Cathy Harry; Cathy Lund; Gill Saxby; Sandy Coppinger; Sarah Ogilvie; Susan Beck	NTT

=== Lightweight single sculls ===
Games	Gold		Silver		Bronze	
1986	Australia; Adair Ferguson	00:07:45	New Zealand; Philippa Baker	00:07:46	Canada; Heather Hattin	00:07:52

=== Lightweight coxless fours ===
Games	Gold		Silver		Bronze	
1986	England; Alexa Forbes; Gillian Hodges; Lin Clark; Judith Burne	00:06:55	Australia; Deborah Clingeleffer; Amanda Cross; Virginia Lee; Karin Riedel	00:07:00	Canada; Anne Drost; Marni Hamilton; Marlene van der Horst; Wendy Wiebe	00:07:01
