= Rowing at the 1958 British Empire and Commonwealth Games =

- Venue: Llyn Padarn
- Location: Llanberis, Wales
- Dates: 18 to 26 July 1958

Rowing at the 1958 British Empire and Commonwealth Games was the fifth appearance of Rowing at the Commonwealth Games.

Competition featured six events being held at Llyn Padarn in Llanberis, Wales.

England topped the rowing medal table with three gold medals.

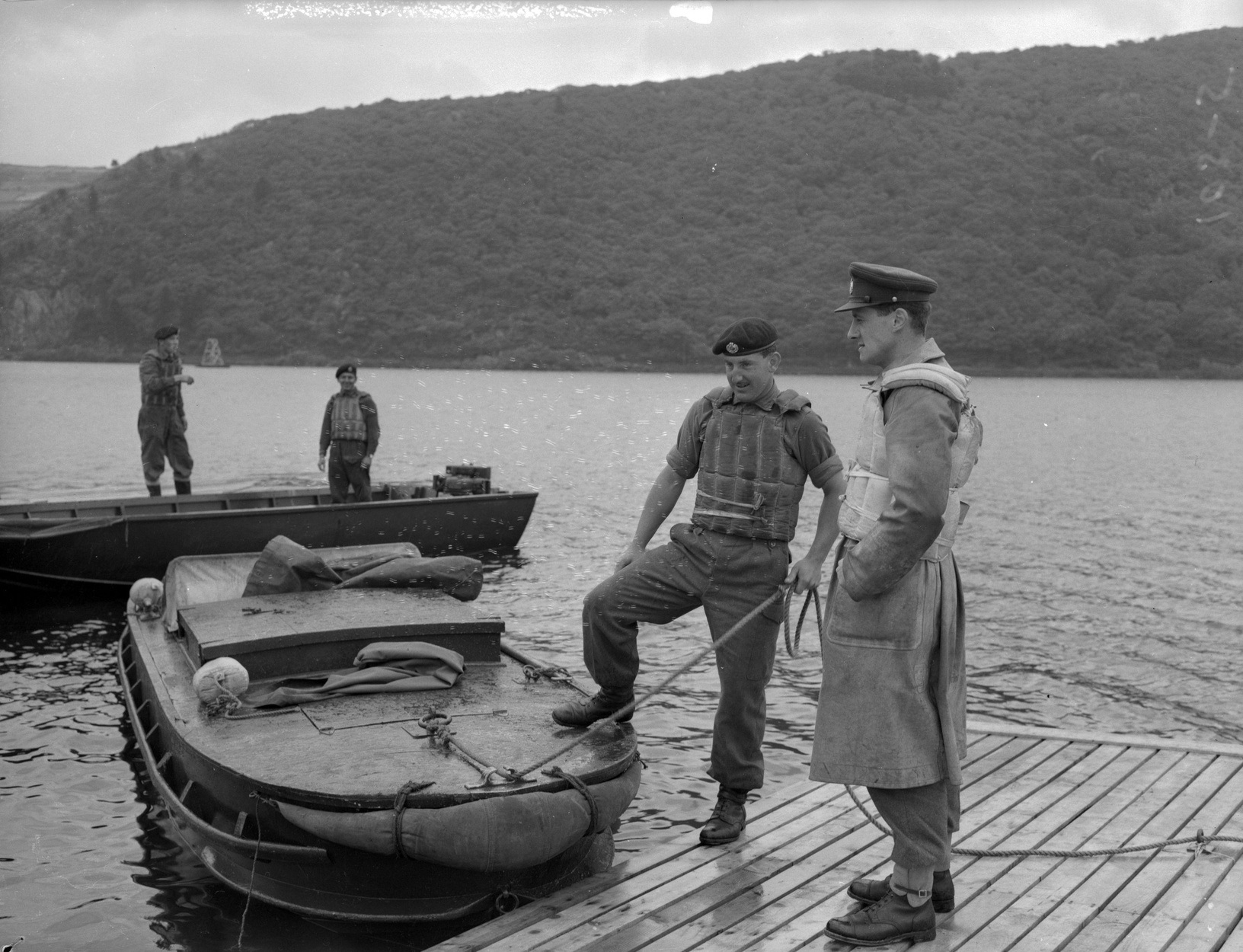
Army preparing Padarn Lake for the Empire Games rowing contests. Attribution:National Library of Wales

== Medal table ==
* Host nation (Wales)

Rank	Nation	Gold	Silver	Bronze	Total
1	England	3	1	2	6
2	Australia	1	2	2	5
3	Canada	1	2	0	3
4	New Zealand	1	1	1	3
5	Wales*	0	0	1	1
6	Northern Ireland	0	0	0	0
6	Scotland	0	0	0	0
6	South Africa	0	0	0	0
Totals (8 entries)		6	6	6	18

== Medal winners ==
Event	Gold	Silver	Bronze
Single sculls	Australia	New Zealand	England
Double Sculls	England	Australia	New Zealand
Coxless pair	New Zealand	England	Australia
Coxless four	England	Canada	Wales
Coxed four	England	Canada	Australia
Eights	Canada	Australia	England

== Single sculls ==
Heat 1

Pos	Team	Time
1	(Australia) Stuart Mackenzie	8:29.1
2	(South Africa) David Meineke	8:30.9
3	(Canada) Tony Biernacki	8:53.5

Heat 2

Pos	Team	Time
1	(New Zealand) James Hill	8:36.8
2	(England) Russell Carver	

Final

Pos	Athlete	Time
1	(Australia) Mackenzie	7:20.1
2	(New Zealand) Hill	7:23.9
3	(England) Carver	7:26.8
4	(South Africa) Meineke	7:33.3

== Double sculls ==
Heat 1

Pos	Team	Time
1	(England) Mike Spracklen & Geoffrey Baker	7:49.3
2	(Canada) Jon Pearce & Larry Stephan	7:58.2
3	(South Africa)	8:18.4

Heat 2

Pos	Team	Time
1	(Australia) Mervyn Wood & Stuart Mackenzie	
2	(New Zealand) Norm Suckling & James Hill	7:50.9

Final

Pos	Athlete	Time
1	(England) Spracklen & Baker	6:56.4
2	(Australia) Wood & Mackenzie	7:01.4
3	(New Zealand) Suckling & Hill	
4	(Canada) Pearce & Stephan	

== Coxless pair ==
Pos	Athlete	Time
1	(New Zealand) Bob Parker & Reg Douglas	7.11.1
2	(England) Tom Christie & Nicholas Clack	7:13.7
3	(Australia) Dave Anderson & Geoff Williamson	7:32.5
4	(Wales) David Edwards & John Edwards	dnf

== Coxless four ==
- No heats

Final

Pos	Athlete	Time
1	(England) Roger Pope, Keith Shackell, David Young & Creighton Redman	6:34.4
2	(Canada) Glen Smith, Malcolm Turnbull, Richard McClure & John Madden	6:38.9
3	(Wales) David Edwards, John Fage, David Prichard & John Edwards	6:47.9
4	(Australia) Victor Schweikert, Kenneth Railton, Bruce Evans, Neville Clinton	7:11.7

== Coxed four ==
Heat 1

Pos	Team	Time
1	Canada	7:21.4
2	England	7:27.9
3	New Zealand	7:51.7

Heat 2

Pos	Team	Time
1	Australia	7:55.3
2	Scotland	7:57.4

Final

Pos	Athlete	Time
1	(England) Colin Porter, John Vigurs, Simon Crosse, Michael Beresford & Richard Gabriel (cox)	6:46.5
2	(Canada) Donald Arnold, Walter D'Hondt, David Helliwell, Lawrence Stapleton & Sohen Biln (cox)	6:53.2
3	(Australia) Mick Allan, Ralfe Currall, Kevin Evans, Roland Waddington & Lionel Robberds (cox)	
4	(New Zealand) Donald Gemmell, Peter Aitchison, Frank Crotty, Graeme Moran & Richard Tuffin (cox)	

== Eights ==
Heat 1

Pos	Team	Time
1	Canada	6:36.1
2	England	7:05.8
3	Northern Ireland	7:30.1

Heat 2

Pos	Team	Time
1	Australia	
2	Scotland	6:55.0

Final

Pos	Athlete	Time
1	(Canada) Archibald MacKinnon, Donald Arnold, Wayne Pretty, Glen Mervyn, Walter D'Hondt, Lorne Loomer, Robert Wilson, Bill McKerlich, Sohen Biln (cox)	5:55.1
2	(Australia) Bruce Evans, Mick Allan, Kenneth Railton, Kevin Evans, Neville Clinton, Ralfe Currall, Peter Waddington, Victor Schweikert, Lionel Robberds (cox)	5:56.1
3	(England) Tony Hancox, Don Elliot, Dennis Mount, Hilali Wober, John A Stephenson, Felix Badcock, J. P. M. Thomson, Dick Workman, Raymond Penney (cox)	6:10.2
4	(Scotland) A. G. Cross, T. Gillies, G. F. Gray, I. G. Inglis, A. Lindsay, A. T. Nelson, J. Ross, Ken J. Scott, B. Parsonage (cox)	6:15.5
