= Michael Payne =

Michael or Mike Payne may refer to:

- Michael Payne (cartoonist), English cartoonist and illustrator
- Michael Payne (executive), former director of the International Olympic Committee
- Michael Payne (interior designer)
- Michael "Clip" Payne (born 1958), Parliament-Funkadelic keyboardist
- Mike Payne (physicist), professor at the University of Cambridge
- Michael Gustavius Payne (born 1969), Welsh painter
- Michael H. Payne (born 1965), science fiction writer
- Mike Payne (baseball) (1961–2002), Major League Baseball pitcher.
- Michael Payne (swimmer), English swimmer
- Michael Payne (politician), British MP for Gedling

== See also ==
- Michael Paine (1928–2018), American engineer
