= Rowing at the 1954 British Empire and Commonwealth Games =

- Venue: Vedder Canal
- Location: Chilliwack, Canada
- Dates: 30 July – 7 August 1954

Rowing at the 1954 British Empire and Commonwealth Games was the fourth appearance of Rowing at the Commonwealth Games.

Competition featured five events being held at the Vedder Canal in Chilliwack, Canada. A temporary dam costing $23,000 was required to ensure there was sufficient water in the canal during competition.

New Zealand topped the rowing medal table with two gold medals and two silver medals.

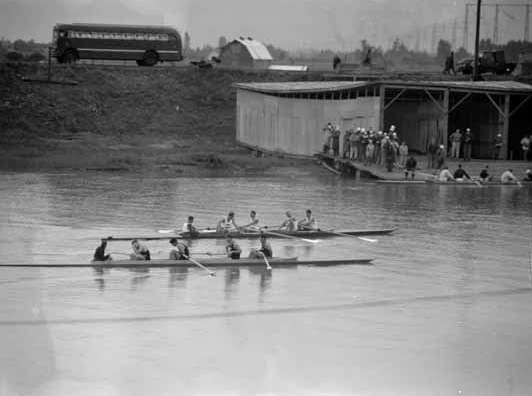
The coxed fours event on the Vedder Canal. Attribution:Province newspaper

== Medal table ==
* Host nation (Canada)

Rank	Nation	Gold	Silver	Bronze	Total
1	New Zealand (NZL)	2	2	0	4
2	Australia (AUS)	2	0	1	3
3	Canada (CAN)*	1	0	2	3
4	England (ENG)	0	3	1	4
Totals (4 entries)		5	5	4	14

== Medal winners ==
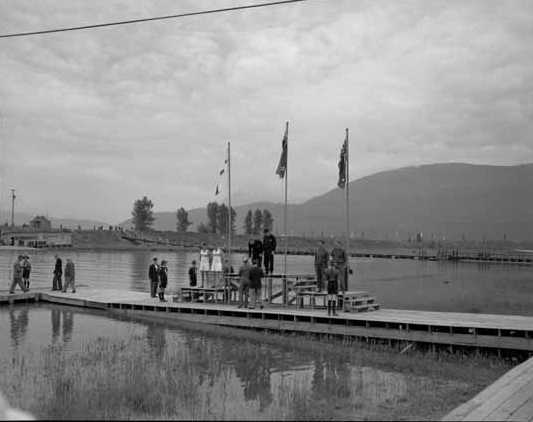
Medal ceremony for the double sculls. Attribution:Province newspaper

Event	Gold	Silver	Bronze
Single sculls	New Zealand	England	Canada
Double sculls	Australia	New Zealand	Canada
Coxless pair	New Zealand	England	Australia
Coxed four	Australia	New Zealand	England
Eights	Canada	England	none

== Single sculls ==
Final

Pos	Athlete	Time
1	(New Zealand) Don Rowlands	8:28.2
2	(England) Sidney Rand	8:43.4
3	(Canada) Bobby Williams	8:51.3

Heats

- Rand 9.05.0 bt (Australia) Peter Evatt 9.18.3
- Rowlands 8.52.1 bt Williams 9.14.8

== Double sculls ==
- Only three entries

Pos	Athlete	Time
1	(Australia) Mervyn Wood & Murray Riley	7:54.5
2	(New Zealand) Bob Parker & Reg Douglas	8:05.2
3	(Canada) Donald Guest & Larry Stephan	8:28.5

== Coxless pair ==
- Only three entries

Pos	Athlete	Time
1	(New Zealand) Bob Parker & Reg Douglas	8:23.9
2	(England) Tom Christie & Nicholas Clack	8:24.1
3	(Australia) Dave Anderson & Geoff Williamson	8:29.7

== Coxed four ==
Final

Pos	Athlete	Time
1	(Australia) Dave Anderson, Peter Evatt, Geoff Williamson, Mervyn Wood & Lionel Robberds (cox)	7:58.3
2	(New Zealand) Bruce Culpan, Kerry Ashby, Murray Ashby, Bill Tinnock & Stanley Callagher (cox)	8:04.4
3	(England) M.G.C Savage, John Macmillan, Alastair Davidson, Maurice Legg & David Glynne-Jones (cox)	8:04.5

Heats

- Australian 8.10.0 bt New Zealand 8.13.9
- England 8.22.7 bt Canada (Walter Plata, Joseph Bialik, Daryl MacDonald, Gordon Cudney, Eric Blair) 8:35.7

== Eights ==
- Only two entries, the Canadian crew was from the University of British Columbia and the English crew was from the Thames Rowing Club.

Pos	Athlete	Time
1	(Canada) Douglas McDonald, Glen Smith, Herman J. Zloklikovits, Ken J. Drummond, Lawrence West, Ray Sierpina, Robert Wilson, Thomas Toynbee & Thomas Harris (cox)	6:59.0
2	(England) Alastair Davidson, Alan Watson, Geoffrey Page, John Pope, Joe Eldeen, M.G.C. Savage, Maurice Legg, John Macmillan & David Glynne-Jones (cox)	7:10.5
