= Athletics at the 1958 British Empire and Commonwealth Games – Men's shot put =

Men's shot put at the Commonwealth Games

The men's shot put event at the 1958 British Empire and Commonwealth Games was held on 24 July at the Cardiff Arms Park in Cardiff, Wales.

== Results ==
| Rank | Name | Nationality | Result | Notes |
|---|---|---|---|---|
| 1st place, gold medalist(s) | Arthur Rowe | England | 57 ft 8 in (17.58 m) | |
| 2nd place, silver medalist(s) | Martyn Lucking | England | 54 ft 1 1/2 in (16.50 m) | |
| 3rd place, bronze medalist(s) | Barry Donath | Australia | 51 ft 9 3/4 in (15.79 m) | |
| 4 | Johannes Botha | South Africa | 51 ft 2 3/4 in (15.61 m) | |
| 5 | Nicholas Morgan | England | 51 ft 0 3/4 in (15.56 m) | |
| 6 | Mike Lindsay | Scotland | 50 ft 7 in (15.42 m) | |
| 7 | Les Mills | New Zealand | 50 ft 1 in (15.27 m) | |
| 8 | Stanley Raike | Canada | 49 ft 2 1/2 in (15.00 m) | |
| 9 | Derek McCorquindale | England | 46 ft 4 1/2 in (14.14 m) | |
| 10 | Parduman Singh Brar | India | 46 ft 3 1/4 in (14.10 m) | |
| 11 | Andrew Payne | Southern Rhodesia | 45 ft 1 1/4 in (13.75 m) | |
| 12 | Hywel Williams | Wales | 43 ft 11 in (13.39 m) | |
| 13 | Louis Ogbogu | Nigeria | 42 ft 8 in (13.00 m) | |
| 14 | John Davies | Wales | 42 ft 7 3/4 in (13.00 m) | |
| 15 | Gerald Harrison | Jersey | 41 ft 9 1/4 in (12.73 m) | |
| | Muhammad Iqbal | Pakistan | DNS | |
| | Fanie du Plessis | South Africa | DNS | |
