= England at the 1958 British Empire and Commonwealth Games =

- CGF code: ENG
- CGA: Commonwealth Games England

in Cardiff, Wales
- Medals Ranked 1st: Gold 29 Silver 22 Bronze 29 Total 80

British Empire and Commonwealth Games appearances
- 1930; 1934; 1938; 1950; 1954; 1958; 1962; 1966; 1970; 1974; 1978; 1982; 1986; 1990; 1994; 1998; 2002; 2006; 2010; 2014; 2018; 2022; 2026; 2030

England at the 1958 British Empire and Commonwealth Games in Cardiff, Wales, from 18 to 26 July 1958.

England topped the medal table with 29 gold medals, 22 silver medals and 29 bronze medals.

== Medal table (top 3) ==
Rank	Nation	Gold	Silver	Bronze	Total
1	England	29	22	29	80
2	Australia	27	22	17	66
3	South Africa (SAF)	13	10	8	31
Totals (3 entries)		69	54	54	177

The athletes that competed are listed below.

== Athletes ==
Men

Name	Club	Event/s	Medal/s
Peter Allday	London AC	Hammer	Bronze medal
Don Anthony	Polytechnic Harriers	Hammer	
Bob Birrell	Birchfield Harriers	120y hurdles	
Michael Blagrove	Ealing Harriers	1 mile	
Ian Boyd	Herne Hill Harriers	1 mile	
Adrian Breacker	Mitcham AC	100y, relay	Gold medal
Robbie Brightwell	Shrewsbury Tech Coll	220y	
Robin Brunyee	Worksop College	120y hurdles	
Michael Bullivant	Derby County & AC	3 miles	
Dennis Cakebread	Coventry Godiva Harriers	Long jump	
Ted Buswell	Great Yarmouth AC	880y	
Gerry Carr	Loughborough Coll & Woodford Green AC	Discus	Bronze medal
Peter Clark	R.A.F & Thames Valley Harriers	3 miles	
Eric Cleaver	Army & London AC	Discus	
Roy Cruttenden	Polytechnic Harriers	Long jump	
Peter Cullen	Rotherham Harriers	Javelin	
Raymond Davies	London Univ & Hornchurch Harriers	Javelin	
Stanley Eldon	Windsor and Eton AC	6 miles	
Geoff Elliott	Woodford Green AC	Pole vault	Gold medal
Mike Ellis	Loughborough Coll & Thames Valley Harriers	Hammer	Gold medal
Mike Farrell	Birchfield Harriers	880 yards	
Tom Farrell	Liverpool Harriers	440y hurdles	
Denis Field	Birchfield Harriers	Triple jump	
Hugh Foord	Brighton AC	6 miles	
Chris Goudge	Manchester Univ & Bolton United Harriers	440y hurdles	
Brian Hewson	Mitcham AC	880y, 1 mile	Silver medal
Peter Hildreth	Polytechnic Harriers	120y hurdles	
Martin Hyman	Portsmouth AC	6 miles	
Derek Ibbotson	South London Harriers	3 miles	
Derek Johnson	Woodford Green AC	440y, relay	Silver medal
Arthur Keily	Derby County & AC	Marathon	
Colin Kemball	Wolverhampton AC	Marathon	
Eddie Kirkup	Rotherham Harriers	Marathon	
John Kitching	Achilles Club	High jump	
Clive Loveland	London AC	Javelin	
Martyn Lucking	London Univ & Southend AC	Shot put	Silver medal
Vic Matthews	London AC	120y hurdles	
Derek McCorquindale	Metropolitan Police	Shot put	
John Metcalf	Achilles Club	440y hurdles	
Gordon Miller	Hermes	high jump	
Nicholas Morgan	Croydon Harriers	Shot put	
Frederick Norris	Bolton United Harriers	6 miles	
John Scott-Oldfield	Achilles Club	220y	
Keith Parker	Lunesdale AC	Long jump	
Gordon Pirie	South London Harriers	1 & 3 mile/s	
Rex Porter	Birchfield Harriers	Pole vault	
Peter Radford	Birchfield Harriers	100 & 220y, relay	Gold medal
Michael Ralph	Myron AC	Triple jump	
Mike Rawson	Birchfield Harriers	880y	Bronze medal
Arthur Rowe	Doncaster Plant Works A.C	Shot put	Gold medal
John Salisbury	Birchfield Harriers	440y, relay	Silver medal
Ted Sampson	Blackheath Harriers	440y, relay	Silver medal
Roy Sandstrom	R.A.F & London AC	100y, relay	Gold medal
David Segal	Thames Valley Harriers	100 & 220y, relay	Gold medal
Colin Smith	R.A.F & Thames Valley Harriers	Javelin	Gold medal
Ian Ward	Bury AC	Pole vault	
David Westerhout	London Univ & Woodford Green AC	440y hurdles	
Peter Wilkinson	Derby County & AC	marathon	Bronze medal
Ken Wilmshurst	Walton AC	Long jump, Triple jump	
Dave Wilson	Hercules AC	High jump	
John Wrighton	Southgate Harriers	440y, relay	Silver medal
Fred Wyers	Darlington AC	Triple jump	

Women

Name	Club	Event/s	Medal/s
Suzanne Allday	Spartan Ladies	Discus, Shot put	,
Audrey Bennett	Essex Ladies	High jump	
Mary Bignal	London Olympiades	High jump, Long jump	Silver medal
Margaret Callender	Ilford AC	Javelin	
Jean Card	Croydon Harriers	High jump	
Josephine Cook	London Olympiades	Shot put	
Marianne Dew	Selsonia	220y	
Maya Giri	Phoenix AC	Discus	
Moyra Hiscox	Spartan Ladies	220y	
Sheila Hoskin	Spartan Ladies	High jump, Long jump	Gold medal
Dorothy Hyman	Hickleton Main	100y, relay	Gold medal
Iris Mouzer	Birchfield Harriers	Shot put	
Marian Needham	Walton AC	Long jump	
Sylvia Needham	Spartan Ladies	Discus	
June Paul	Spartan Ladies	100 & 220y, relay	Gold medal
Sue Platt	London Olympiades	Javelin	
Carole Quinton	Birchfield Harriers	80m hurdles	Silver medal
Dorothy Shirley	Salford Harriers	High jump	
Mary Tadd	London Olympiades	Javelin	
Madeleine Weston	Selsonia	100y, relay	,
Jean Whitehead	London Olympiades	Long jump	
Averil Williams	Hereford AC	Javelin	Bronze medal
Heather Young	Longwood Harriers	100 & 220y, 80m hurdles relay	,,

== Boxing ==
Name	Club	Event/s	Medal/s
Tommy Bache	Golden Gloves, Liverpool	flyweight	Silver medal
Peter Benneyworth	Caius BC, Battersea	bantamweight	
Roy Beaman	Royal Air Force	featherweight	
Johnny Caiger	Monteagle ABC, London	middleweight	Bronze medal
Johnny Cooke	Maple Leaf, Bootle	lightweight	Bronze medal
Joey Jacobs	Victoria Avenue, Manchester	light welterweight	Bronze medal
Joe Leeming	Army	light heavyweight	
Brian Nancurvis	Army	welterweight	Bronze medal
Stuart Pearson	Doncaster Plant Works ABC	light middleweight	Silver medal
David Thomas	Polytechnic BC	heavyweight	Silver medal

== Cycling ==
Name	Club	Event/s	Medal/s
Karl Barton	Coventry Road Club	Sprint	Silver medal
Lloyd Binch	Notts Castle BC	Sprint	Bronze medal
Ray Booty	Ericsson Wheelers	Road	Gold medal
Bill Bradley	Southport RCC	Road	
John Entwistle	Fallowfield CC	Time trial	
Mike Gambrill	Clarence Wheelers	Pursuit	
John Geddes	Melling Wheelers	Road, Scratch	
Keith Harrison	Wyndham RCC	Scratch, Sprint, Time trial	
Bill Holmes	Hull Thursday RC	Road	
Johnny Ralph	Polytechnic CC	Scratch	
Norman Sheil	Melling Wheelers	Pursuit	Gold medal
Tom Simpson	Harworth & District CC	Pursuit	Silver medal
Neville Tong	Polytechnic CC	Time trial	Gold medal

== Diving ==
Men

Name	Club	Event/s	Medal/s
Ray Cann	Highgate	10m Platform	Bronze medal
Keith Collin	Isleworth	3m Springboard	Gold medal
Brian Phelps	Highgate	10m Platform	Silver medal
Peter Squires	Highgate	3m Springboard	
Peter Tarsey	Ealing	10m Platform	Bronze medal

Women

Name	Club	Event/s	Medal/s
Ann Long	Ilford	3m Springboard, 10m Platform	Silver medal
Liz Ferris	Mermaid SC	3m Springboard	Bronze medal
Molly Wieland	Isander	10m Platform	Bronze medal
Charmain Welsh	Durham City	3m Springboard, 10m Platform	Gold medal

== Fencing ==
Men

Name	Event/s	Medal/s
Michael Amberg	Sabre, Sabre team	,
Ralph Cooperman	Sabre, Sabre team	,
Harold Cooke	Foil, Foil Team	Gold medal
Bill Hoskyns	Épée, Épée team, Sabre	,,,
Mike Howard	Épée, Épée team	,
Allan Jay	Épée, Épée team	,
Raymond Paul	Foil, Foil Team	,
René Paul	Foil, Foil Team	,
Eugene Verebes+	Sabre team	Gold medal

+ Part of the Sabre team but withdrew from some later matches through injury

Women

Name	Event/s	Medal/s
Mary Glen-Haig	Foil	Bronze medal
Gillian Sheen	Foil	Gold medal

== Lawn bowls ==
Name	Club	Event/s	Medal/s
Percy Baker	Poole Park BC	singles	Gold medal
John Bettles	Raunds Methodists BC	rinks/fours	Gold medal
Fred Horn	Torquay	pairs	
Norman King	Parliament Hill BC	rinks/fours	Gold medal
Walter Phillips	Boscombe Cliff BC	rinks/fours	Gold medal
John Scadgell	Worthing BC	rinks/fours	Gold medal
Harold Shapland	Tiverton Boro BC	pairs	

== Rowing ==
Name	Club	Event/s	Medal/s
Felix Badcock	Thames Rowing Club	Eights	Bronze medal
Geoffrey Baker	Marlow Rowing Club	Double sculls	Gold medal
Michael Beresford	Barn Cottage	Coxed four	Gold medal
Russell Carver	First and Third Trinity Boat Club	Single sculls	Bronze medal
Simon Crosse	London RC/Barn Cottage RC	Coxed four	Gold medal
Stewart Douglas-Mann	St Edmund Hall Boat Club	Coxless Pair	Silver medal
Don Elliot	Thames Rowing Club	Eights	Bronze medal
Richard Gabriel	Barn Cottage	Coxed four	Gold medal
Jonathan Hall	Lincoln College Boat Club	Coxless Pair	Silver medal
Tony Hancox	Thames Rowing Club	Eights	Bronze medal
Dennis Mount	Thames Rowing Club	Eights	Bronze medal
Raymond Penney	Thames Rowing Club	Eights	Bronze medal
Roger Pope	National Provincial Bank RC	Coxless four	Gold medal
Colin Porter	Barn Cottage RC	Coxed four	Gold medal
Creighton Redman	National Provincial Bank RC	Coxless four	Gold medal
Keith Shackell	National Provincial Bank RC	Coxless four	Gold medal
Mike Spracklen	Marlow Rowing Club	Double sculls	Gold medal
John A Stephenson	Thames Rowing Club	Eights	Bronze medal
John Thomson	Thames Rowing Club	Eights	Bronze medal
John Vigurs	London RC/Barn Cottage	Coxed four	Gold medal
Hilali Wober	Thames Rowing Club	Eights	Bronze medal
Dick Workman	Thames Rowing Club	Eights	Bronze medal
David Young	National Provincial Bank RC	Coxless four	Gold medal

== Swimming ==
Men

Name	Club	Event/s	Medal/s
Malcolm Barnes	Stoke Newington	440y freestyle, freestyle relay	
Terry Boyes	York City	440y freestyle	
Richard Campion	Stoke Newington	220y butterfly	
Stanley Clarke	Plaistow United	110y freestyle, freestyle relay	
Alan Clarkson	York City	440y freestyle	
Brian Curtis	Watford	220y butterfly	
Brian Day	Sheffield	220y breaststroke	
Richard Hemingway	Holbeck	220y breaststroke	
Peter Kendrew	York City	110y freestyle	
Neil McKechnie	Wallasey	110y freestyle, freestyle & medley relay	Bronze medal
Michael Payne	Bristol Central	110y backstroke	
Haydn Rigby	Southport	110y backstroke	
Graham Sykes	Coventry	110y backstroke, medley relay	Bronze medal
Graham Symonds	Coventry	220y butterfly, freestyle & medley relay	,
Chris Walkden	Beckenham	220y breaststroke, medley relay	,

Women

Name	Club	Event/s	Medal/s
Jackie Dyson	Kingston Ladies	220y breaststroke	Silver medal
Margaret Edwards	Heston	110y backstroke	Silver medal
Elspeth Ferguson	York City	440y freestyle	
Christine Gosden	Croydon	110y breaststroke & butterfly, medley relay	,
Judy Grinham	Hampstead	110y backstroke & freestyle, 2 x relay	,,
Sylvia Lewis	Hounslow	110y backstroke	
Anita Lonsbrough	Huddersfield	220y breaststroke, medley relay	,
Anne Marshall	Kingston Ladies	110y freestyle, freestyle relay	Bronze medal
Anne Morton	Blackpool	110y butterfly	
Beryl Noakes	Woolwich	freestyle relay	Bronze medal
Jean Oldroyd	Dewsbury	110y butterfly	
Judy Samuel	Surrey Ladies	440y freestyle	
Diana Wilkinson	Stockport	110 & 440y freestyle, 2 x relay	,

== Weightlifting ==
Name	Club	Event/s	Medal/s
Ron Brownbill	Wallasey AC	Bantamweight	Silver medal
R. Gore		Middle Heavyweight	
Ben Helfgott	Hackney, London	Lightweight	Bronze medal
Laurie Levine	Leeds	Middleweight	
Ken McDonald	YMCA Club, London	Heavyweight	Gold medal
George Manners	Hackney, London	Light Heavyweight	
Allan Robinson	Chorley, Lancs	Featherweight	

== Wrestling ==
Name	Club	Event/s	Medal/s
Bert Aspen	Bolton Harriers	62kg featherweight	Bronze medal
Peter Christie	Sparta AWC, London	52kg flyweight	
Dennis Gilligan	Manco AWC, Stretford	57kg bantamweight	
Herbie Hall	Bolton Harriers	68kg lightweight	
David Ickringill	Manco AWC, Stretford	74kg welterweight	
Harry Kendall	John Ruskin, Walworth	90kg Light heavyweight	
Ray Myland	John Ruskin, Walworth	82kg Middleweight	Bronze medal
Kenneth Richmond	Galtymore, London	100kg Heavyweight	
