= Vigurs =

Vigurs is a surname. Notable people with the surname include:

- Charles Vigurs (1888–1917), British gymnast
- Iain Vigurs (born 1988), Scottish footballer
- John Vigurs (1930–1994), British rower
