= Lincoln College Boat Club =

British rowing club

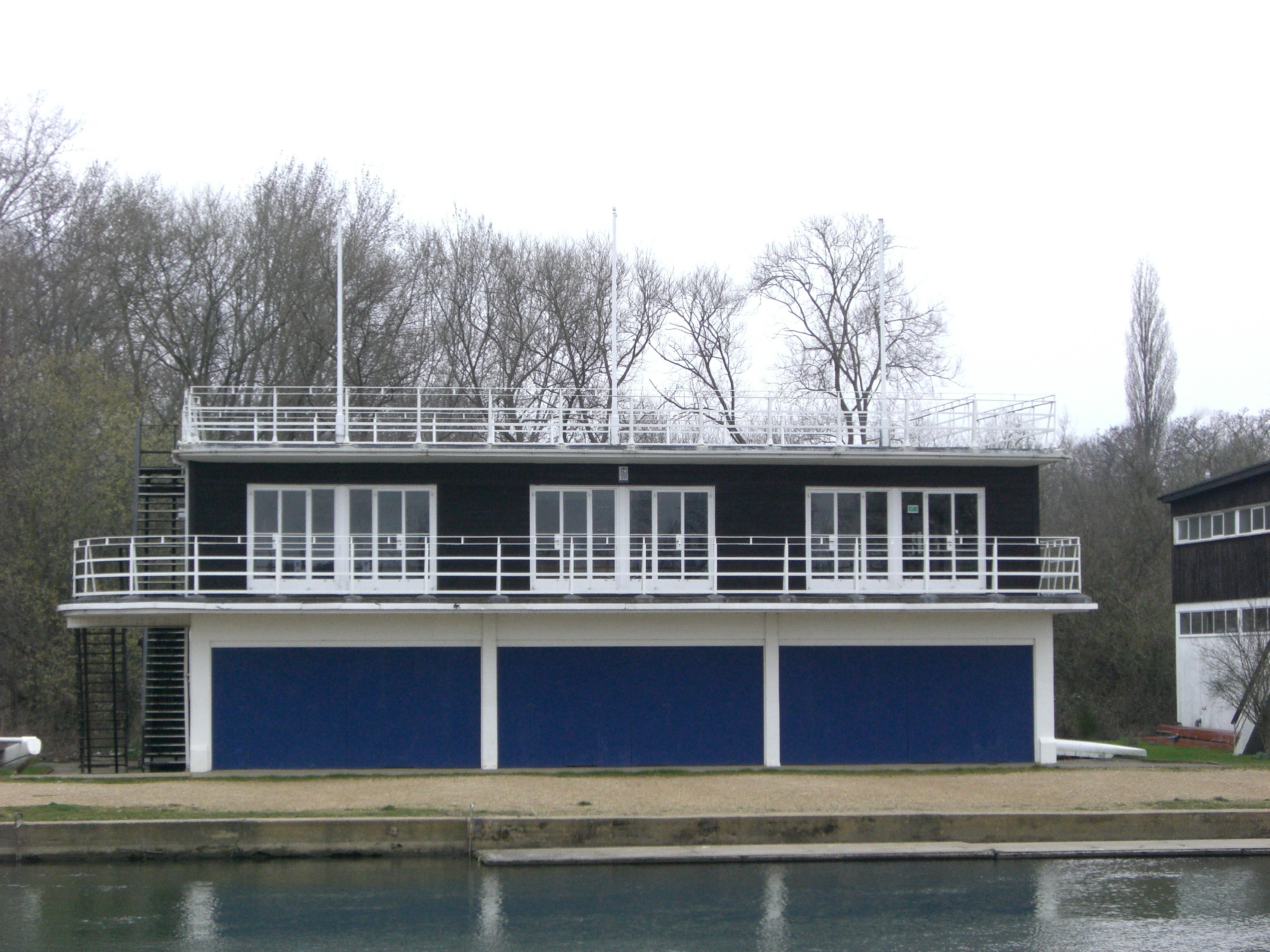

- Boathouse shared with Oriel and The Queen's
- Location: Boathouse Island, Christ Church Meadow, Oxford, Oxford
- Coordinates: 51.743165°N 1.249286°W
- Home water: The Isis
- Founded: 1847
- University: University of Oxford
- Colours: dark blue, light blue
- Affiliations: British Rowing (boat code LIC); Downing College BC (Sister college)
- Website: www.lincolnrowing.co.uk

Lincoln College Boat Club is a rowing club for members of Lincoln College, Oxford. It is based on the Isis at Boathouse Island, Christ Church Meadow, Oxford, Oxford.

The club shares a boathouse with Oriel College Boat Club and The Queen's College Boat Club. The club competes in the Torpids and Summer Eights and the Henley Fours and Eights. They have also participated in Henley Women's Regatta, qualifying past the time trial stages in 2023.

== History ==
Jonathan Hall represented the club and the England team at the 1958 British Empire and Commonwealth Games in Cardiff, Wales.

== Honours ==
=== Henley Royal Regatta ===
Year	Races won
1850	Ladies' Challenge Plate
1921	Visitors' Challenge Cup
1959	Stewards' Challenge Cup

=== Boat Race representatives ===
The following rowers were part of the rowing club at the time of their participation in The Boat Race.

Men's boat race

Year	Name
1868	A. C. Yarborough
1869	A. C. Yarborough
1872	J. A. Ormsby
1873	J. A. Ormsby
1874	J. Williams
1884	P. W. Taylor
1885	P. W. Taylor
1902	D. Milburn
1902	J. G. Milburn
1903	D. Milburn
1925	A. H. Franklin
1947	D. A. M. Mackay
1954	E. O. G. Pain
1955	E. O. G. Pain
1958	Jonathan Hall
1960	C. M. Davis
1961	C. M. Davis

Year	Name
1962	C. M. Davis
1963	M. Q. Morland
1964	M. Q. Morland
1965	M. Q. Morland
1974	P. J. Marsden
1997	Nick J. Robinson
1998	Paul A Berger
1998	Nick J. Robinson
2000	Andrew G. G. Dunn
2000	Nick J. Robinson
2000	Alex Reid
2002	Andrew Dunn
2019	Ben Landis
2021	Jean-Philippe Dufour
2023	Jean-Philippe Dufour

Women's boat race

Year	Name
2015	Nadine Graedel Iberg

== See also ==
- University rowing (UK)
- Oxford University Boat Club
- Rowing on the River Thames
