= Ted Buswell =

British middle-distance runner

Personal information
- Nationality: British (English)
- Born: 16 June 1933 (age 92) Islington, London, England

Sport
- Sport: Athletics
- Event: middle distance
- Club: Great Yarmouth AC

Edward Dean Campbell Buswell (born 16 June 1933) is a male former athlete who competed for England.

== Biography ==
Buswell was born in Islington, London but was a member of Great Yarmouth AC. Buswell finished third behind Ron Delany in the 880 yards event at the 1957 AAA Championships.

He represented the England athletics team in the 880 yards at the 1958 British Empire and Commonwealth Games in Cardiff, Wales.

== Personal life ==
He married Olympic swimmer Anne Morton in Blackpool during 1959. Their son Murray Buswell competed in the Aquatics at the 1986 Commonwealth Games.
