= Anne Morton =

British swimmer

Personal information
- Nationality: British (English)
- Born: 20 May 1937 (age 89) Lancashire, England

Sport
- Sport: Swimming
- Strokes: Butterfly
- Club: Blackpool

Anne Morton married name Anne Buswell (born 20 May 1937) is a British former swimmer. She competed in the women's 100 metre butterfly at the 1956 Summer Olympics.

== Biography ==
In May 1958 she took part in the Empire Games trials in Blackpool and subsequently represented the English team at the 1958 British Empire and Commonwealth Games in Cardiff, Wales, where she competed in the 110 yards butterfly event.

At the ASA National British Championships she won the 110 yards butterfly title in 1956.

In 1959, she married athlete Ted Buswell in Blackpool during 1959. Their son Murray Buswell competed in the Aquatics at the 1986 Commonwealth Games.
