= Jonathan Hall (rower) =

British rower

Personal information
- Nationality: British (English)
- Born: c.1938

Sport
- Sport: Rowing
- University team: Lincoln College Boat Club
Medal record
Rowing
Representing England
British Empire & Commonwealth Games
Silver medal – second place	1958 Cardiff	coxless pair

Michael Jonathan W Hall (born c.1938), is a male former rower who competed for England and Oxford.

== Rowing career ==
Hall represented the England team at the 1958 British Empire and Commonwealth Games in Cardiff, Wales and won a silver medal in the coxless pair with Stewart Douglas-Mann.

He rowed for Oxford against Cambridge in the 1958 boat race and was with Lincoln College, Oxford at the time.
