= Denis Field =

English field athlete (1931-2021)

Personal information
- Nationality: British (English)
- Born: 1931 Birmingham, England
- Died: 15 April 2021 (aged 90) Sunderland, England

Sport
- Sport: Athletics
- Event: Triple jump
- Club: Birchfield Harriers

Denis W. Field (1931 – 15 April 2021) was an athlete who competed for England.

== Biography ==
Field was a member of the Birchfield Harriers and represented the England athletics team in the triple jump at the 1958 British Empire and Commonwealth Games in Cardiff, Wales.

At the age of 80, Field was still active for the Sunderland Harriers Athletic Club, and was a Chairman and President of the Veterans Athletic Association of the North East of England. He died in Sunderland on 15 April 2021, at the age of 90.
