= Southampton University Boat Club =

British rowing club

- Motto: The Heights Yield to Endeavour
- Location: Oliver Road, Southampton, England
- Home water: River Itchen
- Founded: 1904 (approx)
- Key people: Mike Beresford (Chief Coach)
- Membership: 120
- Affiliations: British Rowing
- Website: www.subc.co.uk

Southampton University Boat Club (SUBC) is the rowing club for students of Southampton University. SUBC is a member of the University of Southampton's Student Union, has over 100 active members, and attracts over 80 new members at the start of every academic year. The boathouse is on the River Itchen, a tidal river in Southampton.

== History ==
The club has no definite founding date, and although the earliest evidence of the club to be found existed in 1904, it was not registered as a club with British Rowing until 1929.

Mike Beresford, a former European Silver Medalist, Commonwealth Gold Medalist, and Olympic finalist in the 1960 Roman Olympics, as well as a winner of various events at Henley Royal Regatta started coaching at the club in the early 1970s and celebrated 50 years of coaching at Southampton in 2021.

== Club colours ==
The club colours are maroon, gold and navy blue. Club members race in a tri-colour all-in-one of dark blue with maroon and gold side stripes with the club crest on the chest.

== Races ==
The club competes at a number of regattas and head races throughout the academic year (September - August). Prior to Christmas the club's main focus is the Bristol Head Race. This event provides developing crews with the academic year's first taste of inter-university competition and the beginner crews with the first chance to apply what they have learnt in race conditions. The club also sends its athletes to the National Indoor Rowing Championships.

After Christmas, the club enters a number of events during the continuing head season. These include BUCS Head and hosts a Varsity Head race against other South Coast universities. After this other events in which the club typically competes include BUCS Regatta, Reading Regatta, Henley Women's Regatta, and Henley Royal Regatta.

== Notable members ==
- Guin Batten
- Miriam Batten
- Michael Beresford
- Michael Morison
- Per Sætersdal
