= Felix Badcock =

English rower

Personal information
- Nationality: British (English)
- Born: 1935 Marylebone, London, England
- Died: 11 January 2015 (aged 79–80)

Sport
- Sport: Rowing
- Club: Thames Rowing Club
Medal record
Rowing
Representing England
British Empire & Commonwealth Games
Bronze medal – third place	1958 Cardiff	eights

John Felix Charles Badcock known as Felix Badcock (1935 – 11 January 2015), was a male rower who competed for England.

== Biography ==
He represented the England team and won a bronze medal in the eights event at the 1958 British Empire and Commonwealth Games in Cardiff, Wales.

The eights crew consisted entirely of members of the Thames Rowing Club and who won the final of the Empire Games Trials from the 1st and 3rd Trinity Boat Club, Cambridge.

His father was John Badcock (also known as Felix) and his mother was Joyce Cooper. His brother Francis 'David' M Badcock (born 1937), also rowed for the Thames RC and was a reserve for 1958 Commonwealth games crew in addition to rowing in the 1958 boat race.

He died in 2015.
