= Fred Wyers =

British/Canadian athlete

Personal information
- Nationality: British (English / Canadian
- Born: 1932 Prescot, England
- Died: 16 July 2006 (aged 73) Canada

Sport
- Sport: Athletics
- Event: Triple jump
- Club: Darlington AC

Frederick Wyers (1932-2006), was a male athlete who competed for England and Canada.

== Biography ==
Wyers was a member of Darlington AC.

He represented the England athletics team in the triple jump at the 1958 British Empire and Commonwealth Games in Cardiff, Wales.

He emigrated to Canada in 1960, via Lethbridge Alberta and became the 1963 Canadian Triple Jump Champion.
