= John Entwistle (cyclist) =

English cyclist (1932–2013)

Personal information
- Nationality: British (English)
- Born: 16 July 1932 Burnley, Lancashire, England
- Died: 23 March 2013 (aged 80) Burnley, Lancashire, England

Sport
- Sport: Cycling
- Club: Fallowfield CC

John Entwistle (16 July 1932 – 23 March 2013), was a male cyclist who competed for England.

== Biography ==
Entwistle represented the England team in the 1 Km time trial at the 1958 British Empire and Commonwealth Games in Cardiff, Wales.

He was a telephone engineer and council leader.
