= Robin Brunyee =

English high hurdler

Personal information
- Nationality: British (English)
- Born: Second quarter 1939 Worksop, England
- Died: 7 August 2014 (aged 75) Carnforth, Lancashire
- Education: Worksop College

Sport
- Sport: Athletics
- Event: Hurdles
- Club: Worksop Harriers; Birchfield Harriers

Peter Robin Brunyee (1939 – 7 August 2014), was a male athlete who competed for England in the high hurdles.

== Biography ==
Brunyee was a prodigious schoolboy hurdler and won the intermediate boys England Schools 110y title (14.1s) in 1955. A year later he won the senior boys 120y hurdles title at Shrewsbury with a championship record of 14.9s. After leaving school he further improved his best junior time to 14.6s, which until recently was still listed in the UK all-time junior lists.

He was the first Worksop Harrier athlete to represent England.

He represented England athletics team in the 120 yards hurdles at the 1958 British Empire and Commonwealth Games in Cardiff, Wales.
