= Terry Boyes =

English swimmer

Personal information
- Nationality: British (English)
- Born: 1 October 1935 South Bank, York, England
- Died: 10 January 2017 (aged 81) York, England

Sport
- Sport: Swimming
- Event: Freestyle
- Club: York City

Terry Boyes (1 October 1935 – 10 January 2017), was a male swimmer who competed for England.

== Biography ==
Boyes first swam for Great Britain at the age of 21 against China in an international match in Peking.

In May 1958 he took part in the Empire Games trials in Blackpool and subsequently represented the English team at the 1958 British Empire and Commonwealth Games in Cardiff, Wales, where he competed in the 440 yards freestyle event.

He was a member of the York City Baths Club and completed national service for the Royal Air Force. He later worked as an engraver for Williams Sessions Printers in Huntingdon. In 1960 he broke a leg when a motorcycle hit him while watching the Isle of Man TT which caused him to lose out on a place at the 1960 Summer Olympics in Rome.
