= John Davies (shot putter) =

Welsh athlete

Personal information
- Nationality: British (Welsh)
- Born: c.1941 Wales

Sport
- Sport: Athletics
- Event: Shot put
- Club: Llanelly G.S.

John Rowland Davies (born c.1941) is a former track and field athlete from Wales, who competed at the 1958 British Empire and Commonwealth Games (now Commonwealth Games).

== Biography ==
Davies was educated the Llanelly Grammar School and was the 1958 Welsh Secondary Schools champion. He also broke the Welsh senior record by throwing 45 feet 4 inches.

In June 1958 he represented South Wales against North Wales in a warm up event before the Empire Games, finishing runner-up behind Hywel Williams in the shot put event.

He represented the 1958 Welsh team at the 1958 British Empire and Commonwealth Games in Cardiff, Wales, where he participated in one event; the shot put.
