= Nicholas Morgan (shot putter) =

British athlete (died 2020)

Personal information
- Nationality: British (English)
- Died: 1 November 2020

Sport
- Sport: Athletics
- Event: Shot put
- Club: Croydon Harriers

Nicholas Morgan (died 1 November 2020) was an athlete who competed for England.

== Biography ==
Morgan was a member of Croydon Harriers and weighed in at over 19 stones, he was consistently throwing passed the 50 feet mark in 1958.

He represented the England athletics team in the shot put at the 1958 British Empire and Commonwealth Games in Cardiff, Wales.

Morgan was a member of the Surrey County Athletic Association. He died on 1 November 2020.
