= John Thomson (rower) =

British rower

Personal information
- Nationality: British (English)
- Born: 1932
- Died: 2019

Sport
- Sport: Rowing
- Club: Thames Rowing Club; Leander Club
Medal record
Rowing
Representing England
British Empire & Commonwealth Games
Bronze medal – third place	1958 Cardiff	eights

John Peter McKay Thomson (1932 – 2019) was a male rower who competed for England.

== Biography ==
Thomson won the Wyfold Challenge Cup as part of the Royal Engineers crew at the 1956 Henley Royal Regatta.

He represented the England team and won a bronze medal in the eights event at the 1958 British Empire and Commonwealth Games in Cardiff, Wales.

The eights crew consisted entirely of members of the Thames Rowing Club who won the final of the Empire Games Trials from the 1st and 3rd Trinity Boat Club, Cambridge.
