= Johnny Ralph =

English cyclist

Personal information
- Nationality: British (English)
- Born: 6 October 1931 Hammersmith, London, England
- Died: 11 July 1984 (aged 52) Poole, England

Sport
- Sport: Cycling
- Club: Polytechnic CC

John William Ralph (1931–1984), was a male cyclist who competed for England.

== Biography ==
Ralph represented the England team in the 10 miles scratch at the 1958 British Empire and Commonwealth Games in Cardiff, Wales. He suffered a puncture during the race which ended any hopes of gaining a medal.

Around 1949 he joined the Polytechnic “Poly” cycling club based at Herne Hill and Paddington. He later wished to ride for the Clarion Cycling Club but the Polytechnic Club demanded the repayment of a donation which ultimately led to the Cycling Union banning him from racing but he continued to train younger cyclists at Palmer Park, Reading.

During a holiday on 8 July 1984, Johnny and his eldest son Stephen were involved in cycling accident with a car and caravan, Johnny was severely injured and died in hospital on 11 July 1984.
