= Designing for the Sexes =

HGTV television series

- Presented by: Michael Payne; Susan Hunt; Richard Whiteford
- No. of seasons: 9
- No. of episodes: 135

Production
- Production company: Pie Town Productions

Original release
- Network: HGTV
- Release: 1998 – 2011

Designing for the Sexes is a television show on HGTV. In each episode, a married couple with distinct tastes about decorating consult with an interior designer to create a room that meets both their needs. The presenter helped reconcile their choices, which could range from traditional to contemporary furnishings and different colour schemes. It aired from 1998 until 2011.

Designing for the Sexes (1998) was hosted by Michael Payne.

Designing for the Sexes (2002) was hosted by Susan Hunt.

Designing for the Sexes (2008) was hosted by Richard Whiteford II as "Rick Rifle".

135 episodes over 9 seasons were produced by Pie Town Productions for Home and Garden Television.
