= Rowing at the 1938 British Empire Games =

- Venue: Nepean River,
- Location: Penrith, Australia
- Dates: 5 – 12 February 1938

At the 1938 British Empire Games, the rowing competition featured four events for men with only four nations competing and all four events having only three starters.

The sport had not been included at the 1934 British Empire Games in London but returned in 1938 with events being held 50 kilometres to the west in Penrith, where a one and a quarter mile stretch of the Nepean River was selected. Because of the location being so far away from the athletes village at the Sydney Showground, the rowers were accommodated at the Lapstone Hill Hotel (a former mansion called Logie).

Australia topped the rowing medal table with three gold medals.

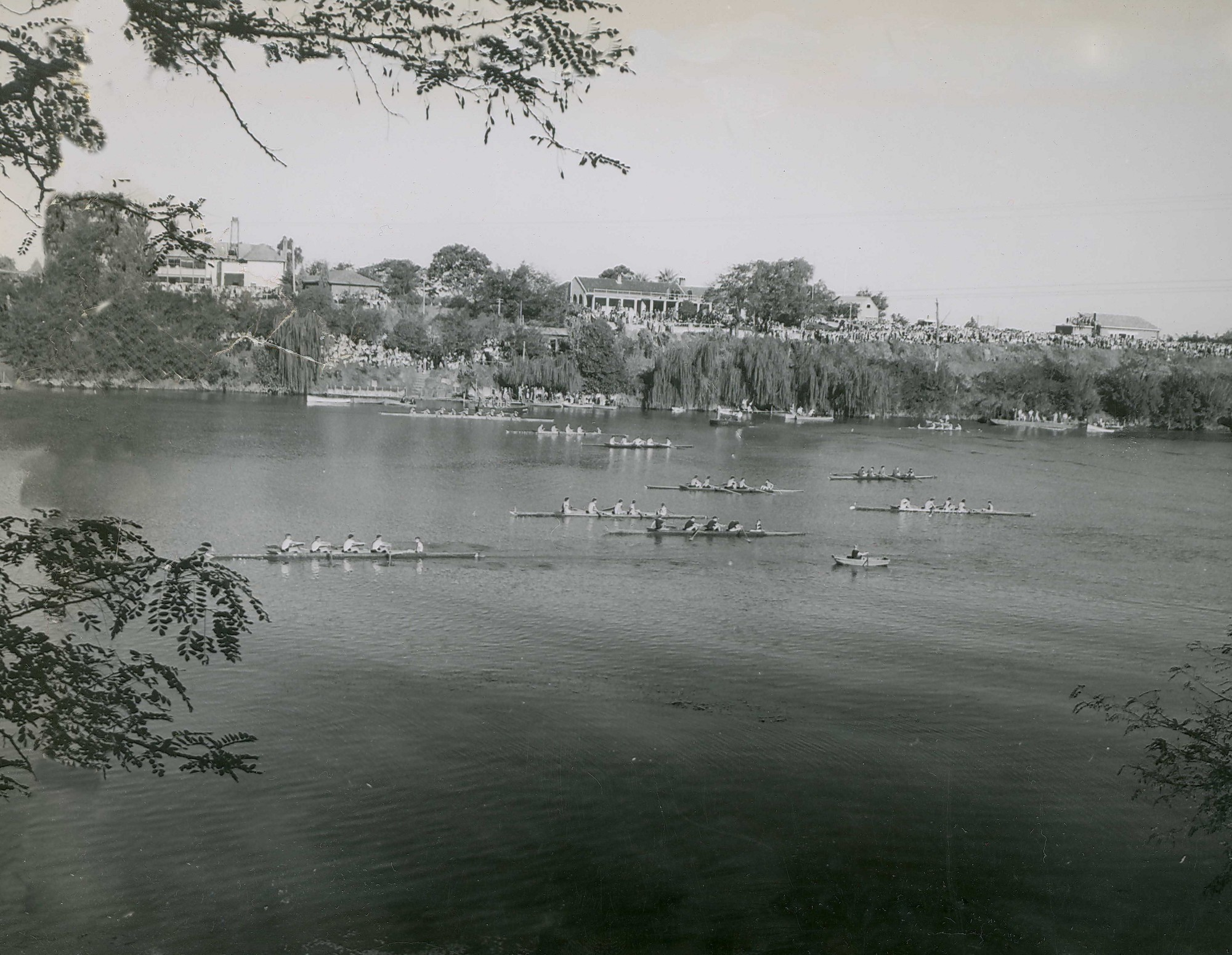
A regatta taking place on the Nepean River rowing course

== Medal table ==
* Host nation (Australia)

Rank	Nation	Gold	Silver	Bronze	Total
1	Australia*	3	1	0	4
2	England	1	2	0	3
3	New Zealand	0	1	3	4
4	Canada (CAN)	0	0	1	1
Totals (4 entries)		4	4	4	12

== Medal winners ==
The double sculls competition was an invitation event and originally no medals were awarded but they are counted in the medal table today.

Event	Gold	Silver	Bronze
Single sculls	Australia	England	New Zealand
Double sculls	Australia	England	New Zealand
Coxed four	Australia	New Zealand	Canada
Eights	England	Australia	New Zealand

== Results ==
=== Single sculls ===
Pos	Athlete	Time
1	(Australia) Herb Turner	8:24
2	(England) Peter Jackson	5 lengths
3	(New Zealand) Robert Smith	4 lengths

=== Double sculls ===
Pos	Athlete	Time
1	(Australia) Cecil Pearce & William Bradley	7:29.4
2	(England) Jack Offer & Dick Offer	9 lengths
3	(New Zealand) Gus Jackson & Robert Smith	10 lengths

=== Coxed four ===
Pos	Athlete	Time
1	(Australia) Don Fraser, Gordon Freeth, Jack Fisher, Stewart Elder, Harry Kerr (cox)	7:16.8
2	(New Zealand) Albert Hope, John Rigby, Ken Boswell, Jim Clayton, George Burns (cox)	+1.25 lgths
3	(Canada) Donald Davis, James Temple, James MacDonald, Max Winkler, Kenneth Jaggard (cox)	+0.75 lgths

=== Eights ===
Tim Turner was included in the England eight which caused controversy because he lived in Australia and was only selected in the team because he was born on England and was formerly a member of the London Rowing Club which the rest of the team belonged to. London RC member Roger Harman vacated the seat to allow Turner to compete in the crew.

Pos	Athlete	Time
1	(England) Basil Beazley, Desmond Kingsford, John Sturrock, John Burrough, John Turnbull, Peter Jackson, Rhodes Hambridge, Tim Turner, William Reeve (cox)	6:29
2	(Australia) Joe Gould, Alfred J. Gregory, Ted Bromley, Francis A W le Souef, Gordon H Yewers, Richard L. Paramor, William Godfrey Thomas, Bill Dixon, Doug Bowden (cox)	+0.75 lgths
3	(New Zealand) Gus Jackson, Cyril Stiles, Rangi Thompson, Howard Benge, John Charters, Les Pithie, Oswald Denison, James Gould, William Stodart (cox)	+2 lgths
