= Wyfold Challenge Cup =

Rowing competition

- Venue: Henley Royal Regatta, River Thames
- Location: Henley-on-Thames, Oxfordshire
- Dates: 1855 – present

The Wyfold Challenge Cup is a rowing event for men's coxless fours (originally coxed fours until 1874) at the annual Henley Royal Regatta on the River Thames at Henley-on-Thames in England. It is open to male crews from a single rowing club. Boat clubs from any university, college or secondary school are not permitted.

The trophy was presented in 1847 by George David Donkin, and named after his home, Wyfold Court. It was originally awarded to the winner of the trial heats for the Grand, but in 1855 it became a new event for fours.

London Rowing Club has won the event 24 times.

== Past winners ==
Year	Winner	Winning crew	Runner-Up	ref
1855	Royal Chester Rowing Club	Maudsley, E. B. Gibson, E. Dixon, J. B. Letterdale, Hugh Roberts+	Wargrave Club	
1856	Argonaut Club	J. Nottidge, A. A. Casamajor, J. Paine, H. H. Playford, F. Levien+	Royal Chester Rowing Club	
1857	Pembroke College, Oxford	P. W. Phipps, R. N Townsend, J. H Godbar, J. Corkell, William R. Portal +	London Rowing Club	
1858	First Trinity, Cambridge (row over)	N. Royds, A. J. Smith, Darrack, Wyatt, J. T. Morland+	London Rowing Club (scr)	
1859	First Trinity, Cambridge	S. Heathcote, D. Ingles, J. Lyle, N. Royds, J. T. Morland+	Kingston Rowing Club	
1860	London Rowing Club	F. Potter, A. Schlotel, C. A. Schlotel, W. Foster, H. H. Weston+	Kingston Rowing Club	
1861	Brasenose College, Oxford	R. Shepperd, W. C. Harris, W. Champney, H. B. Woodgate, C. E. Parker+	London Rowing Club	
1862	London Rowing Club	H. Hood, G. P. R. Grubb, F. Fenner, W. Stout, E. T. Weston+	West London Rowing Club	
1863	Kingston Rowing Club	H. Cobbett, J. H. Percival, A. Wilson, W. Gibbon, F Walton+	London Rowing Club	
1864	Kingston Rowing Club (row over)	A. Wilson, G Meynell, W. Seymour, W. R. Griffiths, C. Walton+	only one crew	
1865	Kingston Rowing Club	A. H. Harrington, G. Meynell, H. B. Middleton, R. F. Wade, E. Clowes+	Third Trinity, Cambridge	
1866	Kingston Rowing Club	C. C. Mowbray, G. Meynell, H. B. Middleton, L. Corrie, C. Walton+	London Rowing Club	
1867	Kingston Rowing Club	O. W. Fuller, A. J. Finch, A. O.Kirby, W. Gibbons, H. Walton+	Oxford Etonian Club	
1868	Kingston Rowing Club	S. Hall, D. Darbyshire, R. Ross, W.Gibbons, F.Walton+	Twickenham Rowing Club	
1869	Oscillators Club, Kingston	W. Shoolbred, W. A. Ward, A. Shoolbred, J. Maude, G. Harrington+	Kingston Rowing Club	
1870	Thames Rowing Club	William H. Eyre, George H. Vize, William L. Slater, A. J. Lowe, John Shearman+	Oxford Etonian Club	
1871	Thames Rowing Club	H. J. Smith, George H. Vize, William L. Slater, John Shearman+	Kingston Rowing Club	
1872	Thames Rowing Club	J. Hastie, J. A. Cameron, George H Vize, William L. Slater, A. Christie+	London Rowing Club	
1873	Kingstown Harbour Boat Club, Dublin	R. C. O'Flaherty, H. Byrne, F. Taylor, W. B. Beatty, R. G. Stannard+	London Rowing Club	
1874	Newcastle Amateur Rowing Club	W. H. Wilde, G. Dunn, T. Thompson, F. G. Mason	Royal Chester Rowing Club	
1875	Thames Rowing Club	E. Slade, P. Hermon, H. J. Chinnery, F. H. M. Leander	London Rowing Club	
1876	West London Rowing Club	W. Purvis, D. J. Cowles, W. A. Morgan, J.Hughes	London Rowing Club	
1877	Kingston Rowing Club (row over)	A. Crabbe, C. D. Heatley, F. R. Adams, W. P. Phillips	Twickenham Waldegrave RC (scr)	
1878	Kingston Rowing Club	G. H. Smith, H. M. Robinson, J. A. Watson Taylor, E. A. Clowes	London Rowing Club	
1879	London Rowing Club	C. G. White, W. A. D. Evanson. C. G. Ellis, P. Adcock	Thames Rowing Club	
1880	London Rowing Club	E. J. Beal, W. R. Grove, W. W. Hewitt, P. Adcock	Third Trinity, Cambridge	
1881	Dublin University Rowing Club	R. H. Labat, D. E. Burtchaell, R. Hassard, G. A. E. Hickson	London Rowing Club	
1882	Jesus College, Cambridge	H. Stokes, M. Hutchinson, Stephen Fairbairn, P. W. Atkin	First Trinity, Cambridge	
1883	Kingston Rowing Club	F. Cobb, H. A. Harvey, H. S. Till, R. H. Cobb	Third Trinity, Cambridge	
1884	Thames Rowing Club	Benjamin W. Looker, W. Liddle, Stephen Fairbairn, Arthur M. Hutchinson	Marlow Rowing Club	
1885	Kingston Rowing Club	W. Musgrave, A. C. Colledge, W. P. Gore Graham, N. P. Symonds	London Rowing Club	
1886	Thames Rowing Club	F. W. Long, S. M. Cooke, Peregrine S. Propert, Benjamin E. Cole	Trinity Hall, Cambridge	
1887	Pembroke College, Cambridge	J. W. Ashworth, W. O. Duncan, C. Maturin, F. T. Prior	London Rowing Club	
1888	Thames Rowing Club	Charles M. Hughes, Arthur S. Falconer, Peregrine S. G. Propert, John W. Fogg-Elliot	London Rowing Club	
1889	London Rowing Club	G. C. Vaux, H. W. Reeves, B. B. Cubitt, Percy A. N. Thorn	Thames Rowing Club	
1890	Kingston Rowing Club	F. J. Bell, W. O. Hudson, E. T. Fison, W. J. Thompson	Thames Rowing Club	
1891	Royal Chester Rowing Club	S. G. Cox, A. Fairie, R. E. E. Brocklebank, H. Fairie	Kingston Rowing Club	
1892	Molesey Boat Club	N. A. Block, H. A. Block, A. Piper, F. Collinson	Trinity College Dublin	
1893	Molesey Boat Club	N. A. Block, H. A. Block, A. Piper, F. Collinson	Medway Rowing Club	
1894	Thames Rowing Club	G. G. Taylor, J. R. Orford, H. C. Arthur, A. Bogle	Balliol College, Oxford	
1895	London Rowing Club	A. F. G. Everitt, F. S. Lowe, F. P. Barton, W. J. Thompson	First Trinity, Cambridge	
1896	Trinity College, Oxford	C. N. Harrison, S. P. Beale, C. Thompson, A. G. Anderson	London Rowing Club	
1897	Kingston Rowing Club	J. Crisp, H. C. Firman, A. C. Ferguson, T. A. Kirkham	Jesus College, Cambridge	
1898	Kingston Rowing Club	J. Crisp, H. C. Firman, F. H. Noke, Lord Vivian	Caius College, Cambridge	
1899	Trinity Hall, Cambridge	J. A. Bott, R. F. Adams, F. J. Escombe, C. M. Steel	London Rowing Club	
1900	Trinity Hall, Cambridge	H. F. Farquharson, A. Landale, C. H. Hole, C. M. Steel	Kingston Rowing Club	
1901	Trinity Hall, Cambridge	A. Landale, C. Landale, F. J. Escombe, B. C. Cox	Chris's College, Cambridge	
1902	Burton Rowing Club	T. Nadin, R. K. Beamont, H. Beck, C. W. Rudyard	Kingston Rowing Club	
1903	Kingston Rowing Club	A. A. Stuart, J. H. Piper, A. C. Fitzclarence, R. Willis	London Rowing Club	
1904	Birmingham Rowing Club	S. E. Alldridge, J. W. Frame, S. H. Johnson. F. C. Glover	London Rowing Club	
1905	London Rowing Club	E. D. Hay Currie, R. B. Freeman, W. R. Gaskell, G. R. Davis	Reading Rowing Club	
1906	London Rowing Club	J. N. Balme, J. R. K. Fenning, R. B. Freeman, P. Dewar	Thames Rowing Club	
1907	Magdalen College, Oxford	C. R. Cudmore, J. A. Gillan, D. Mackinnon, J. R. Somers-Smith	London Rowing Club	
1908	Thames Rowing Club	A. E. Snellgrove, K, Doulton, J. S. Wilkes, C. G. Sprague	London Rowing Club	
1909	Balliol College, Oxford	J. H. F. Grenfell, V. A. Barrington-Kennett, J. W. Heineman, M. B. Higgins	Christ Church, Oxford	
1910	Trinity Hall, Cambridge	W. J. Davy, C. M. Stuart, R. S. Adams, S. Swann	London Rowing Club	
1911	Pembroke College, Cambridge	H. M. Heyland, R. D. S. Charles, J. H Gardner, P. V. S. Vander Byl	Kingston Rowing Club	
1912	Queens' College, Cambridge	W. H. Ferguson, E. J. B. M. Kennett, E. W. Wood, H. W. Arden	London Rowing Club	
1913	Lady Margaret BC, Cambridge	G. L. Day, R. A. G. B. Ryley, R. S.Clarke, D. T. Day	University College, Oxford	
1914	London Rowing Club	T. McK. Hughes, H. Lumb, F. S. Laskey, M. S. Ell	Lady Margaret Boat Club, Cambridge	
1920	Thames Rowing Club	Kenneth Wilson, S. Wachtmeister, Stephen Fairbairn, Charles Rew	Vesta Rowing Club	
1921	Jesus College, Cambridge	P. F. Randall, P. Godfrey-Faussett, H. L. Holman, G. G. C. Adami	Royal Chester Rowing Club	
1922	Thames Rowing Club	Herbert Holman, Alexander Long, Thomas Southgate, Charles Rew	Kingston Rowing Club	
1923	Imperial College Boat Club	A. F. Webber, E. A. Murphy, G. E. Pain, H. A. Rofe	Jesus College, Cambridge	
1924	Royal Chester Rowing Club	C. A. Britton, A. M. Miln, J. Vere Denning, E. G. Ffoulkes-Morris	Imperial College Boat Club	
1925	Thames Rowing Club	Gordon Killick, Harold M. Lane, Thomas R. F. Barrett-Lennard, John C. Badcock	Selwyn College, Cambridge	
1926	London Rowing Club	C. F. K. Mellor, A. J. Peppercorn, W. E. E. Webb, T. N. O'Brien	Lady Margaret Boat Club, Cambridge	
1927	Thames Rowing Club	G. D. Smith, D. Wheeler, Gordon Killick, W. S. Douglas	Vesta Rowing Club	
1928	Trinity College, Oxford	J. C. Horton, R. Lane, G. W. Farquharson, R. J. Elles	Jesus College, Cambridge	
1929	Thames Rowing Club	Charles Winn, Hugh Dulley, Henry Sporborg, Eric Beresford	Jesus College, Cambridge	
1930	London Rowing Club	R. Close Brooks, E. G. L. Howitt, G. H. Crawford, T. N. O'Brien	Vesta Rowing Club	
1931	Thames Rowing Club	Basil Joyner, Thomas Tyler, Rowland George, Fedor Bunge	Vesta Rowing Club	
1932	London Rowing Club	R. Close Brooks, G. B. Wood, D. H. Mays-Smith, T. D. M. Boyland	Nottingham Union Rowing Club	
1933	London Rowing Club	J. G. Webb, R. W. Burkitt, A. E. C Drake, E. D. Wetton	Westminster Bank Rowing Club	
1934	Reading Rowing Club	S. W. Latham, D. G. Newton, B. S. Fidler, E. T. Johnson	Royal Chester Rowing Club	
1935	Reading Rowing Club	D. Habbitts, H. B. Willett, H. W. Rushmere, W. H. Hooban	Thames Rowing Club	
1936	London Rowing Club	J. H. Pinches, R. R. Lack, M. P. Lee, O. St. J. Hamlin	Reading Rowing Club	
1937	London Rowing Club	J. Ormiston, H. Carter, J. H. Pinches, C. L. Morris	Walton Rowing Club	
1938	London Rowing Club	A. B. Fraser, W. T, Robertson, T. E. Hendrie, I. G. Esplin	Royal Chester Rowing Club	
1939	Maidenhead Rowing Club	B. C. D. Eastick, F. L. Ashton, J. G. Bisset, A. J. L. Lion	Tigre Boat Club, Argentina	
1946	King's College, London		Thames Rowing Club	
1947	Quintin Boat Club		Thames Rowing Club	
1948	Victoria Lake RC, South Africa		Royal Chester Rowing Club	
1949	Lensbury Rowing Club		Royal Chester Rowing Club	
1950	Royal Engineers RC	D. K. Hill, P. Stanton, G. Godenir, T. D. Raikes	RAF Benson Rowing Club	
1951	Caius College, Cambridge		Clare College, Cambridge	
1952	Corpus Christi College, Cambridge	Peter Hall	Worcester College, Oxford	
1953	Royal Air Force Rowing Club	Colin Porter	Molesey Boat Club	
1954	Royal Engineers RC	T. M. Attlee, R Barrett, D. H. McLellan, S. M. Atkins	Marlow Rowing Club	
1955	Thames Rowing Club	Gordon Dear, John Pope, Alex Riemer, Hugh Denning	Kettering Rowing Club	
1956	Royal Engineers RC	J. P. M. Thomson, J. K. M Hennessy, B. E. Griffin, George Justicz	Brockville Rowing Club, Canada	
1957	National Provincial Bank Rowing Club	Creighton Redman, D. G. Stuart, Keith Shackell, Roger Pope	Putney Town Rowing Club	
1958	Burton Leander Rowing Club	Lionel Street, Jim Gould, Colin Pritchard, George Wilson	Putney Town Rowing Club	
1959	Molesey Boat Club	J. Tilbury, Simon Crosse, R. Knight, A. R. Buchanan	Walton Rowing Club	
1960	St. Thomas' Hospital	H. Pendleton, J. Tuke. P. Hamilton-Stewart, J. Firth	Vesta Rowing Club	
1961	National Provincial Bank RC		South Kent School, USA	
1962	Force Navale Belge		Nottingham City Rowing Club	
1963	Nottingham & Union Rowing Club	J. E. Garton, M. F. Gillott, C. S. Unwin, R Walt	Derby Rowing Club	
1964	Sons of the Thames		Nottingham Britannia Rowing Clubs	
1965	Derby Rowing Club		Christiania RK	
1966	Norwich Union Rowing Club		Kingston Rowing Club	
1967	Tideway Scullers School		Quintin Boat Club	
1968	Severn Scullers Rowing Club		Isis Boat Club	
1969	London Rowing Club	D. Topolski, N. P. Cooper, P. E. Harrison, C. I. Blackwall	Trident RC, South Africa	
1970	Trident RC, South Africa		Thames Tradesmen's Rowing Club	
1971	Harvard University		Marlow Rowing Club	
1972	Leander Club		Trident RC, South Africa	
1973	Thames Tradesmen's Rowing Club		Kingston Rowing Club	
1974	Porcellian Club, USA		Nottingham & Union Rowing Club	
1975	Thames Tradesmen's Rowing Club		Leander Club	
1976	London Rowing Club	D. Bond, I. T. McNuff, J. M. Beattie, M. P. Cross	Potomac Boat Club, USA	
1977	City Orient Scullers’ School		University of London Boat Club	
1978	Molesey Boat Club		London Rowing Club	
1979	Wallingford Rowing Club		Molesey Boat Club	
1980	Nottingham Boat Club		Leander Club	
1981	Hanlan Boat Club, Canada		Leander Club	
1982	Nottingham Boat Club		Trident RC, South Africa	
1983	Lea Rowing Club		London Rowing Club	
1984	NCRA		Nautilus Lightweight Rowing Club	
1985	Molesey Boat Club		Nautilus Lightweight Rowing Club	
1986	Charles River RA, USA		NCRA	
1987	NCRA		Lea Rowing Club	
1988	NCRA		Nautilus Rowing Club	
1989	Leander Club		NCRA	
1990	London Rowing Club	N. J. Strange, N. J. Howe, R. M. W. Williams, S. R. W.Forbes	NCRA	
1991	Nautilus Rowing Club		NCRA	
1992	NCRA		University of London Boat Club	
1993	London Rowing Club 'B'	M. C. H. Williams, S. J. Sinclair, R. M. W. Williams, W. J. Baker	Leander Club	
1994	NCRA		Lea Rowing Club	
1995	Lea Rowing Club	R. P. Metcalf, J. M. Michalitsianos, C. W. E. Collerton, P. M. Brett	Tyrian	
1996	Queen's Tower Boat Club		Molesey Boat Club	
1997	Molesey Boat Club		London Rowing Club	
1998	Bowbridge Rowing Club		Worcester Rowing Club	
1999	Holme Pierrepont Rowing Club		Llandaff Rowing Club	
2000	Worcester Rowing Club		Queen's Tower Boat Club	
2001	Leander Club		NCRA 'A'	
2002	Aberdeen Boat Club		London Rowing Club	
2003	Thames Rowing Club		Army Rowing Club	
2004	London Rowing Club	M. R. Watkin, R. J. McKenzie, J. A. M. Evans, C. M. O'Malley	Army Rowing Club	
2005	Army Rowing Club		Thames Rowing Club	
2006	Thames Rowing Club		Marlow Rowing Club	
2007	1829 Boat Club		London Rowing Club	
2008	Tyne Rowing Club		London Rowing Club	
2009	Sydney Rowing Club, Australia		Nottingham & Union Rowing Club	
2010	Nottingham & Union Rowing Club		London Rowing Club	
2011	London Rowing Club	R. E. Dunley, A. C. Cawthorne, M. D. Aldred, M. A. Espin	Nottingham Rowing Club	
2012	Nottingham Rowing Club		ANA Rowing Club, Perth, Australia	
2013	Tyrian Club		Rob Roy Boat Club	
2014	Upper Thames Rowing Club		Tideway Scullers School	
2015	Molesey Boat Club		Tideway Scullers School	
2016	Grasshopper-Club, Zurich		Upper Thames Rowing Club	
2017	Sport Imperial		Tideway Scullers School	
2018	Molesey Boat Club		Mercantile Rowing Club	
2019	Sydney Rowing Club		Norske Studenters Roklub, Norway	
2020	No competition due to COVID-19 pandemic			
2021	Thames Rowing Club	Benjamin Wright, James Reeder, Stuart Bacas, Felix Rawlinson	Lea Rowing Club	
2022	Thames Rowing Club	Huw Jones, Henry Lambe, Finn Regan, James Stevenson	Norske Studenters Roklub Oslo	
2023	London Rowing Club	Edoardo Marshall, Zac Baxter, Tom Westbrook, George Cowley	Thames Rowing Club	
2024	Marlow Rowing Club	James Doleman, Alfie Heath, Matt Brigham, Mac Collins	Thames Rowing Club	
2025	London Rowing Club	Edoardo Marshall, Rui Xu, Ben Edmondson, James Clarke	Sydney Rowing Club	
2026	Thames Rowing Club 'A'	Cameron Murphy, Joe Stobbs, George Prior, Ferdinand Robson	Sydney Rowing Club 'A'	

== Most wins ==
Club	Wins
London Rowing Club	24
Thames Rowing Club	21
Kingston Rowing Club	14

Key

- + cox
