= Brian Curtis =

British swimmer

Personal information
- Nationality: British (English)

Sport
- Sport: Swimming
- Event: Butterfly
- Club: Watford SC; Otter SC

Brian L. Curtis is a male former swimmer who competed for England.

== Biography ==
In May 1958 he took part in the Empire Games trials in Blackpool and subsequently represented the English team at the 1958 British Empire and Commonwealth Games in Cardiff, Wales, where he competed in the 220 yards butterfly event.

He was a member of the Watford Swimming Club.
