= Dennis Cakebread =

English athlete

Personal information
- Nationality: British (English)
- Born: Third quarter 1938 Coventry
- Education: King Henry VIII School, Coventry
- Occupation: Chartered Surveyor
- Years active: 40
- Employer: 1. Coventry City Council. 2.Inland Revenue District Valuer

Sport
- Sport: Athletics / Rugby Union
- Event: Long Jump
- Club: Coventry Godiva Harriers

Dennis William Cakebread (born 1938), is a male former athlete who competed for England.

== Biography ==
Cakebread was a member of the Coventry Godiva Harriers and won the 1958 Midland long jump title.

He represented England athletics team] in the long jump at the 1958 British Empire and Commonwealth Games in Cardiff, Wales.

In 1960 he joined the Royal Air Force for his 2 years National Service, serving as an Accounts Clerk. He performed his basic training at RAF Bridgenorth and Technical Training at RAF Cranwell. He continued his sporting activity by representing the Royal Air Force at both Triple Jump and Long Jump against the Army and Royal Navy in the Inter-Services Athletic Championships before going on to represent the Combined Services against the Amateur Athletic Association.
