= King's College London Boat Club =

British rowing club

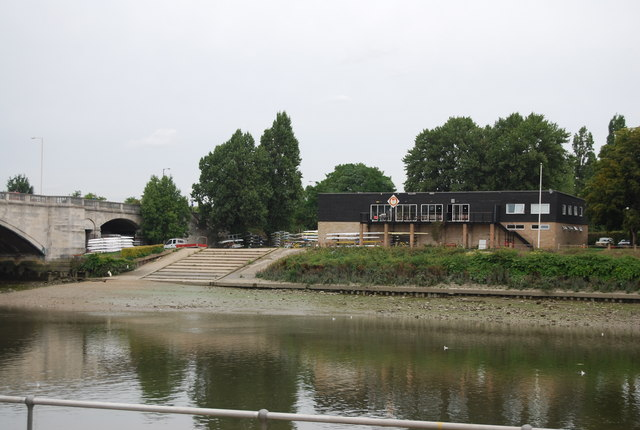

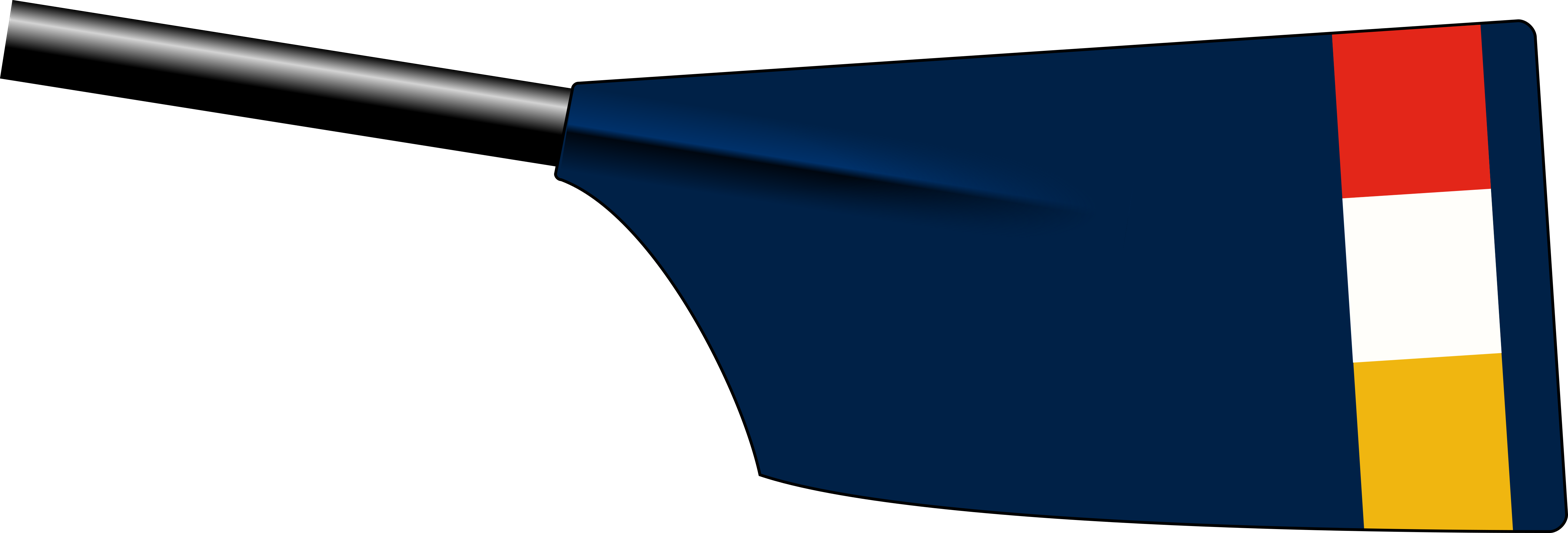
- Location: Tideway Scullers School boathouse, Dan Mason Drive, Chiswick, London, England
- Coordinates: 51.473261°N 0.268316°W
- Affiliations: British Rowing (boat code KCL)
- Website: theboatclub.org.uk

King's College London Boat Club is the rowing club of King's College London based on the Tideway of the River Thames next to Chiswick Bridge, based at Tideway Scullers School boathouse, Dan Mason Drive, Chiswick, London, England. In addition to competing in the Henley Royal Regatta and Head of the River Race, the club also takes part in the United Hospitals competitions which involves all London medical schools. The fleet of boats is stored at the boathouse belonging to the Tideway Scullers School.

== History ==
The club incorporates Guy's Hospital and St Thomas' Hospital which itself merged to become GKT and then the United Medical and Dental School (UMDS) before merging with King's.

In 1841 the club formed the King's College Boat Club Regatta.

In 1933 the club participated in an annual match against University College (Southampton).

In 1946, the club won the prestigious Wyfold Challenge Cup at the Henley Regatta.

== Honours ==
=== Henley Royal Regatta ===
| Year | Winning crew |
|---|---|
| 1946 | Wyfold Challenge Cup |
| 1960 | Wyfold Challenge Cup (As St Thomas' Hospital) |

== See also ==
- Rowing on the River Thames
- University rowing in the United Kingdom
