= Michael Payne (interior designer) =

British interior designer (born 1944)

Michael Payne (born 1944) is the host and interior designer of Home and Garden Television's show Designing for the Sexes. The show was aired from 1998 to 2003, and featured Michael navigating design conflicts between couples with conflicting tastes. Known for his vibrant British charm and his keen sense of design, Michael delighted fans by humorously exposing the gender-based quirks of the show's guests. Each show ended with a joyous reveal of the final room, which contained elements satisfying to both parties.

Payne is the author of "Let's Ask Michael," published in 2003. It was designed by his son, Juston Payne, and published by McGraw-Hill. According to Juston's website, a second book ("Michael's Method") is currently in the works, though specifics on release date are absent.

Michael designed a series of furniture lines, which have been manufactured and distributed by Powell. They are currently for sale through independent distributors. He is frequently the featured speaker at home shows and expos. In 2006, he began a relationship with Wickes Furniture, promoting pieces of their collection he deemed "must haves."

== Book ==
- Let's Ask Michael ISBN 0-07-141627-7 (published March 20, 2003) McGraw-Hill Professional
