= Roger Pope (rower) =

British rower

Personal information
- Nationality: British (English)
- Born: 12 September 1934 Edmonton, London
- Died: 25 October 2014 (aged 80)
- Education: Westminster School, London
- Occupation: bank manager
- Years active: 1952 - 1964
- Employer: National Provincial Bank
- Height: 1.845 m (6 ft 1 in)
- Weight: 12.1/2 st

Sport
- Sport: Rowing
- Club: National Provincial Bank RC; Molesey Boat Club
Medal record
Rowing
Representing England
British Empire & Commonwealth Games
Gold medal – first place	1958 Cardiff	Coxless four

Roger Derek Edward Pope (12 September 1934 – 25 October 2014) was a rower who competed for England and Great Britain.

== Biography ==
Pope represented the England team and won a gold medal in the coxless four at the 1958 British Empire and Commonwealth Games in Cardiff, on Lake Padarn.

He also represented Great Britain in the coxless fours at the European Championships in 1957 and 1958. All four of the gold medal winning crew rowed for the National Provincial Bank Rowing Club.

In 1957 he was part of the National Provinical crew that won the Wyfold Challenge Cup at the Henley Royal Regatta.

Pope died on 25 October 2014, at the age of 80.
