= Michael Payne (swimmer) =

English swimmer

Personal information
- Nationality: British (English)
- Born: Q1 1941 Bristol, England

Sport
- Sport: Swimming
- Event: Backstroke
- Club: Bristol Central

Michael L Payne (born 1941), is a former male swimmer who competed for England.

== Biography ==
Payne attended Bristol Grammar School and swam for the Bristol Central Club.

In May 1958 he took part in the Empire Games trials in Blackpool and subsequently represented the English team at the 1958 British Empire and Commonwealth Games in Cardiff, Wales, where he competed in the 110 yards backstroke event.

In 1968 he was a physical education teacher at Chandos Boys County Secondary School in Netherfield, Nottinghamshire.
