= Alastair Davidson =

Personal information
- Nationality: British (English)

Sport
- Sport: Rowing
- Club: Thames Rowing Club
Medal record
Rowing
Representing England
British Empire & Commonwealth Games
Silver medal – second place	1954 Vancouver	Eights
Bronze medal – third place	1954 Vancouver	Coxed Fours

Alastair R Davidson is a male former rower who competed for England.

== Biography ==
He represented the English team at the 1954 British Empire and Commonwealth Games held in Vancouver, Canada, where he won the silver medal in the eights event and a bronze medal in the coxed fours, both as part of the Thames Rowing Club.

His grandson Freddie Davidson was on the winning Cambridge crew in the 2018 boat race.
