= John Turnbull (rower) =

Australian-born rower who competed for England

Personal information
- Nationality: Australian
- Born: 1917
- Died: 1 January 1942 (aged 24–25) Asia

Sport
- Sport: Rowing
- Club: London Rowing Club
Medal record
Rowing
Representing England
British Empire Games
Gold medal – first place	1938 Sydney	Eights

John Turnbull (1917 – 1 January 1942) was an Australian-born rower who competed for England.

== Rowing career ==
Turnbull represented England at the 1938 British Empire Games in Sydney, Australia, where he competed in the eights event, winning a gold medal. He rowed for the London Rowing Club.

== Personal life ==
Turnbull attended Geelong Grammar School and was a student at Clare College, Cambridge, during 1938. A flying officer in the Royal Australian Air Force during the Second World War, he was killed in action on 1 January 1942, and commemorated on the Ambon Memorial.
