= Hilali Wober =

English rower (1939–2023)

Air Commodore Hilali Wober
Personal information
- Nationality: British (English)
- Born: 6 June 1939 Calcutta, India
- Died: 19 October 2023 (aged 84) Sydney, Australia
- Education: Bryanston School
- Occupation: RAF Officer

Sport
- Sport: Rowing
- Club: Thames Rowing Club; Leander Club
Medal record
Rowing
Representing England
British Empire & Commonwealth Games
Bronze medal – third place	1958 Cardiff	eights

Hilali Antony Wober (6 June 1939 – 19 October 2023) was a senior Royal Air Force Officer and rower who competed for England during the 1958 Commonwealth Games.

== Rowing career ==
Wober represented the England team and won a bronze medal in the eights event at the 1958 British Empire and Commonwealth Games in Cardiff, Wales.

The eights crew consisted entirely of members of the Thames Rowing Club and who won the final of the Empire Games Trials from the 1st and 3rd Trinity Boat Club, Cambridge.

== Personal life ==
Wober was a doctor and undertook flying training in the RAF, retiring at the rank of Air Commodore.

Wober had an avid interest in the arts and was a keen jazz pianist, playing in a range of amateur bands throughout his career. In addition to being a rower all his life and member of the Leander Club, Wober enjoyed playing and watching sport, supporting Arsenal F.C.

Wober was a father to three children, Nicola, Jonathan and Daniel as well as five grandchildren, Hannah, Darcey, Rachel, Benjamin and Katherine. Wober died on 19 October 2023, at the age of 84.
