= Dick Workman =

English rower

Personal information
- Nationality: British (English)
- Born: 1938 (age 87–88) Surrey, England

Sport
- Sport: Rowing
- Club: Thames Rowing Club
Medal record
Rowing
Representing England
British Empire & Commonwealth Games
Bronze medal – third place	1958 Cardiff	eights

Richard J. Workman (born 1938), is a male former rower who competed for England.

== Biography ==
Workman represented the England team and won a bronze medal in the eights event at the 1958 British Empire and Commonwealth Games in Cardiff, Wales.

The eights crew consisted entirely of members of the Thames Rowing Club and who won the final of the Empire Games Trials from the 1st and 3rd Trinity Boat Club, Cambridge.
