= Don Elliot (rower) =

British rower

Personal information
- Nationality: British (English)
- Born: 1929 (age 96–97) Wandsworth, London, England

Sport
- Sport: Rowing
- Club: Thames Rowing Club
Medal record
Rowing
Representing England
British Empire & Commonwealth Games
| Bronze medal – third place | 1958 Cardiff | eights |

Donald 'Don' S S Elliot (born 1929), is a male former rower who competed for England.

== Biography ==
Elliot represented the England team and won a bronze medal in the eights event at the 1958 British Empire and Commonwealth Games in Cardiff, Wales.

He rowed at stroke for the eights crew, which consisted entirely of members of the Thames Rowing Club and who won the final of the Empire Games Trials from the 1st and 3rd Trinity Boat Club, Cambridge.

His son Graham Elliot was captain of the St Catherine's College Boat Club.
