= William Reeve (rower) =

Rower who competed for England

Personal information
- Nationality: British (English)
- Born: 25 December 1913
- Died: 2002 (aged 88) Harlow, Essex, England

Sport
- Sport: Rowing
- Club: London Rowing Club
Medal record
Rowing
Representing England
British Empire Games
Gold medal – first place	1938 Sydney	Eights

William Thomas N Reeve (25 December 1913 – 2002) was a male rower (coxswain) who competed for England.

== Rowing career ==
Reeve rowed for the London Rowing Club.

He represented England at the 1938 British Empire Games in Sydney, Australia, where he competed in the eights event, winning a gold medal.

== Personal life ==
He was a works civil engineer by trade and lived in Westbourne Terrace, London during 1938 before moving to Lancashire.
