= Dennis Mount =

English rower

Personal information
- Nationality: British (English)
- Born: First quarter 1929 Romford, England
- Died: 30 May 2016 (aged 87)

Sport
- Sport: Rowing
- Club: Thames Rowing Club
Medal record
Rowing
Representing England
British Empire & Commonwealth Games
Bronze medal – third place	1958 Cardiff	eights

Dennis R. Mount (1929-2016), was a male rower who competed for England.

== Biography ==
Mount represented the England team and won a bronze medal in the eights event at the 1958 British Empire and Commonwealth Games in Cardiff, Wales.

The eights crew consisted entirely of members of the Thames Rowing Club and who won the final of the Empire Games Trials from the 1st and 3rd Trinity Boat Club, Cambridge.
