= Stewart Douglas-Mann =

British rower

Personal information
- Nationality: British (English)
- Born: 6 February 1938 (age 88) Battle, Sussex, England
- Education: St Edmund Hall, Oxford

Sport
- Sport: Rowing
- University team: St Edmund Hall Boat Club
Medal record
Representing England
Commonwealth Games
Silver medal – second place	Cardiff 1958	Men's Coxless Pair
Representing Great Britain
The Boat Race
Gold medal – first place	The Boat Race 1959	Oxford

Stewart Charles Hamilton Douglas-Mann (born 6 February 1938 in Sussex, England), an alumnus of St Edmund Hall, Oxford, is a former British rower.

== Rowing career ==
Douglas-Mann competed as the bow in the 1959 Boat Races for Oxford which they won.

Representing the England team, Douglas-Mann won a silver medal in the men's coxless pair with Jonathan Hall at the 1958 British Empire and Commonwealth Games.
