= Tim Turner (English rower) =

English rower

Personal information
- Nationality: England; Australia
- Born: England
Medal record
Rowing
Representing England
British Empire Games
Gold medal – first place	1938 Sydney	Eights

Tim Turner was a male rower who competed for England.

== Rowing career ==
Turner was selected in the stroke seat and represented England, where he won a gold medal in the eights at the 1938 British Empire Games in Sydney, New South Wales, Australia.

His inclusion in the eight was controversial because he lived in Australia and was only selected in the team because he was born on England and was formerly a member of the London Rowing Club which the rest of the team belonged to. London RC member Roger Harman vacated the seat to allow Turner to compete in the crew.
