= Tony Hancox =

English rower (1927–2017)

Personal information
- Nationality: British (English)
- Born: 1927
- Died: 18 December 2017 (age 90)

Sport
- Sport: Rowing
- Club: Thames Rowing Club; Leander Club.
Medal record
Rowing
Representing England
British Empire & Commonwealth Games
Bronze medal – third place	1958 Cardiff	eights

Anthony Chapman Hancox (1927 – 18 December 2017), was a male rower who competed for England.

== Biography ==
Hancox represented the England team and won a bronze medal in the eights event at the 1958 British Empire and Commonwealth Games in Cardiff, Wales.

He was the captain of the eights crew, which consisted entirely of members of the Thames Rowing Club and who won the final of the Empire Games Trials from the 1st and 3rd Trinity Boat Club, Cambridge.

He was also a member of the Thames Rowing Club and Leander Club.
