= Michael Beresford =

British rower (born 1934)

Personal information
- Born: 23 March 1934 (age 92) London, England
- Height: 6 ft 0 in (183 cm)
- Weight: 165 lb (75 kg)

Sport
- Sport: Rowing
- Event: Men's coxless four
- Club: Barn Cottage

Achievements and titles
- Olympic finals: 1960 Summer Olympics in Rome
Medal record
Men's rowing
Representing the Great Britain
European Rowing Championships
Silver medal – second place	1954 Bosbaan	Coxless four
Representing England
British Empire & Commonwealth Games
Gold medal – first place	1958 Cardiff	coxed four

John Michael Beresford (born 1934) is a British retired rower and coach who competed at the 1960 Summer Olympics.

== Biography ==
Born in London on 23 March 1934, Beresford was educated at Bedford School. He rowed internationally for seven years in coxed and coxless four and the men's eight. He won a European silver medal, a Commonwealth gold medal and was placed fifth in the coxless four in the 1960 Rome Olympics.

He held Olympic and European records in the coxless four and a Commonwealth Games record which stood for 28 years. He rowed at Henley Royal Regatta over a period of 13 years, being finalist in the Thames Cup, Stewards Cup, the Goblets and Grand Challenge Cup, winning the Grand once, and the Stewards twice.

He represented the England team and won a gold medal in the coxed four event at the 1958 British Empire and Commonwealth Games in Cardiff, Wales.

In 2021, Beresford, celebrated 50 years of coaching at Southampton University Boat Club.

== Family ==
He is the nephew of Jack Beresford and the grandson of Julius Beresford. Both were Olympic rowers.
