= Amanda Cross (rower) =

Australian rower

Personal information
- Nicknames: Grumpy, Mandsy
- Years active: 1983–1990

Sport
- Sport: Rowing
- Club: Adelaide University Boat Club
Medal record
Women's rowing
Representing Australia
World Rowing Championships
Silver medal – second place	1990 Lake Barrington	Lwt W4-
Silver medal – second place	1984 Montreal	Lwt W8+
Bronze medal – third place	1985 Hazewinkel	Lwt W24-
Commonwealth Games
Silver medal – second place	1986 Edinburgh	Lwt W4-

Amanda Cross is an Australian national champion and national representative lightweight rower. She represented Australia at four World Rowing Championships and at the 1986 Commonwealth Games.

== Club and state rowing ==
Cross' senior rowing was done from the Adelaide University Boat Club.

Cross made her state representative debut in 1983 when selected in the South Australian women's lightweight four to contest the Victoria Cup in the Interstate Regatta within the Australian Rowing Championships. She contested further Victoria Cups for South Australia in 1984, 1985, 1986, 1987 and 1990. She stroked those crews in 1987 and 1990.

Wearing Adelaide University colours Cross competed for national titles at the Australian Rowing Championships on numerous occasions. She won the women's lightweight pair championship in 1984 and 1985 with Karin Riedel and again in 1986. She contested the lightweight four title from 1984 to 1988.

== International representative rowing ==
Cross made her Australian representative debut in Montreal in 1984 at the first World Rowing Championships that included lightweight events. There was no FISA championship for the women's eight but Australia sent crews to contest the eights races in anticipation of such events being included in later FISA programmes. The crew performed well taking the silver medal with Cross and her Australian champion team-mate Karin Riedel up the bow end.

In 1985 Cross was in the two seat of the lightweight coxless four who took the bronze medal at the 1985 World Rowing Championships in Hazewinkel. In 1986 she was selected in the bow seat of the Australian lightweight four who competed at the 1986 World Rowing Championships in Nottingham. That crew placed fourth. The same crew went on to the 1986 Commonwealth Games in Edinburgh, where they won a silver medal.

Cross and Pamela Westendorf-Marshall joined Rebecca Joyce and Sally Ninham in the Australian lightweight four in 1990. They gained some international experience with a valuable tour of North America before coming back to Tasmania for the 1990 World Rowing Championships in Lake Barrington. In the final Cross rowed in the bow seat of the Australian four to a silver medal.

== Post competitive rowing ==
Cross took up coaching after retiring from competitive rowing. She coached the South Australian State Junior Development Team and at Pembroke School and Prince Alfred College.

She competed in surf boats at State and National competitions, coached Surf Lifesaving South Australia State Teams and was a Surf Education Instructor.
