= Simon Crosse =

British rower (1930–2021)

Personal information
- Nationality: British (English)
- Born: 21 May 1930 Christchurch, Hampshire, England
- Died: 14 January 2021 (aged 90)

Sport
- Sport: Rowing
- Club: London RC / Molesey BC / Barn Cottage RC
Medal record
Rowing
Representing England
British Empire & Commonwealth Games
Gold medal – first place	1958 Cardiff	coxed four

Simon C. Crosse (21 May 1930 – 14 January 2021) was a British rower who competed at the 1960 Summer Olympics.

== Biography ==
At the 1960 Olympic Games in Rome, Crosse competed in the men's coxed four event.

He the England team and won a gold medal in the coxed four event at the 1958 British Empire and Commonwealth Games in Cardiff, Wales.

In 1959 he was part of the Molesey crew that won the Wyfold Challenge Cup at the Henley Royal Regatta.
