= Creighton Redman =

English rower

Personal information
- Nationality: British (English)
- Born: 24 September 1933 (age 92) Wandsworth, London, England

Sport
- Sport: Rowing
- Club: National Provincial Bank RC
Medal record
Rowing
Representing England
British Empire & Commonwealth Games
Gold medal – first place	1958 Cardiff	Coxless four

Creighton Thomas Redman (born 24 September 1933), is a male former rower who competed for England.

== Biography ==
Redman represented the England team and won a gold medal in the coxless four event at the 1958 British Empire and Commonwealth Games in Cardiff, Wales.

All four of the gold medal winning crew rowed for the National Provincial Bank Rowing Club.

In 1957 he was part of the National Provincial crew that won the Wyfold Challenge Cup at the Henley Royal Regatta.
