= Derek McCorquindale =

English shot putter

Personal information
- Nationality: British (English)
- Born: 29 November 1933 (age 91) Aylesbury, England

Sport
- Sport: Athletics
- Event: Shot put
- Club: Metropolitan Police AC

Derek Harry McCorquindale (born 29 November 1933), is a male former athlete who competed for England.

== Biography ==
McCorquindale, born in Aylesbury, played association football as a goalkeeper for Aylesbury United F.C. before embarking on athletics.

McCorquindale was a member of the Metropolitan Police AC and represented the England athletics team in the shot put at the 1958 British Empire and Commonwealth Games in Cardiff, Wales.
