= John Burrough (rower) =

Rower who competed for England

Personal information
- Nationality: British (English)
- Born: 15 February 1913 Surrey, England
- Died: 26 November 1944 (aged 31)

Sport
- Sport: Rowing
- Club: London Rowing Club
Medal record
Rowing
Representing England
British Empire Games
Gold medal – first place	1938 Sydney	Eights

John Hardy Burrough (1913-1944) was a male rower who competed for England.

== Rowing career ==
Burrough rowed for the London Rowing Club.

He represented the England team and won a gold medal in the eights event at the 1938 British Empire Games in Sydney, Australia.

== Personal life ==
He was the son of Ernest James Burrough and Sophie Burrough, of Epsom, Surrey. He was an works control chemist (distillery and winery) by trade and lived in Downs Avenue, Epsom during 1938.

He was killed during World War II, in 1944 when serving as a flight lieutenant with the Royal Air Force Volunteer Reserve and is commemorated at the Runnymede Memorial.
