= Geoffrey Page (rower) =

English rower, journalist and painter (1929–2002)

Personal information
- Nationality: British (English)
- Born: 4 April 1929 Surrey, England
- Died: 1 April 2002 (aged 72) London, England
- Education: St Pauls' School, London; Slade School of Art, University of London
- Occupation(s): Artist, teacher, rowing coach, rowing journalist

Sport
- Sport: rowing
- Club: Thames Rowing Club
Medal record
Rowing
Representing England
British Empire & Commonwealth Games
Silver medal – second place	1954 Vancouver	Eights
Bronze medal – third place	1954 Vancouver	Coxed Fours

Geoffrey Glascott Houghton Page (4 April 1929 – 2002), was a male rower who competed for England.

== Biography ==
Born on 4 April 1929, the son of James H (Freddie) Page, he married Patricia (Paddy) Page in 1951.

He represented the English team at the 1954 British Empire and Commonwealth Games held in Vancouver, Canada, where he won the silver medal in the eights event, both as part of the Thames Rowing Club. He was also a member of the University College London.

He coached at University College School, University College Dublin and Thames RC.

In 1965 he became a journalist for the Sunday Telegraph and then The Daily Telegraph.
