= Karin Riedel =

Australian rower

Personal information
- Years active: 1980–1985

Sport
- Sport: Rowing
- Club: Adelaide University Boat Club
Medal record
Women's rowing
Representing Australia
World Rowing Championships
Silver medal – second place	1984 Montreal	Lwt W8+
Bronze medal – third place	1985 Hazewinkel	Lwt W24-

Karin Riedel is an Australian national champion and former national representative lightweight rower. She represented Australia at two World Rowing Championships winning medals at both.

== Club and state rowing ==
Riedel's senior rowing was done from the Adelaide University Boat Club.

Riedel made her state representative debut in 1982 when selected along with her sister Rita in the South Australian women's lightweight four to contest the Victoria Cup in the Interstate Regatta within the Australian Rowing Championships. She contested further Victoria Cups for South Australia in 1983, 1984, 1985 and 1986. She stroked all those crews in excepting 1985.

Wearing Adelaide University colours Riedel competed for national titles at the Australian Rowing Championships on numerous occasions. She won the women's lightweight pair championship in 1984 and 1985 with Amanda Cross. She contested the lightweight four title in 1984 and 1985.

== International representative rowing ==
Riedel made her Australian representative debut in Montreal in 1984 at the first World Rowing Championships that included lightweight events. There was no FISA championship for the women's eight but Australia sent crews to contest the eights races in anticipation of such events being included in later FISA programmes. The crew performed well taking the silver medal with Riedel and her Australian champion team-mate Amanda Cross in the bow end.

In 1985 Riedel stroked the Australian lightweight coxless four who took the bronze medal at the 1985 World Rowing Championships in Hazewinkel.
