= David Glynne-Jones =

British rower (born 1929)

Personal information
- Nationality: British (Welsh/English)
- Born: 16 January 1929 (age 97) Conway, Caernarvonshire

Sport
- Sport: Rowing
- Club: Thames Rowing Club
Medal record
Rowing
Representing England
British Empire & Commonwealth Games
Silver medal – second place	1954 Vancouver	Eights
Bronze medal – third place	1954 Vancouver	Coxed Fours

David Robert Glynne-Jones (born 16 January 1929) is a Welsh-born former rower, who competed for England.

== Biography ==
Glynne-Jones represented the English team at the 1954 British Empire and Commonwealth Games held in Vancouver, Canada, where he won the silver medal in the eights event and a bronze medal in the coxed fours, both as part of the Thames Rowing Club.
