= John MacMillan (rower) =

British rower

Roderick MacMillan
Personal information
- Nationality: British (English)
- Born: 2 May 1928 Nice, Alpes-Maritimes, France
- Died: 3 August 2006 (aged 78) Launceston, Cornwall, England

Sport
- Sport: Rowing
Medal record
Rowing
Representing England
British Empire & Commonwealth Games
Silver medal – second place	1954 Vancouver	Eight
Bronze medal – third place	1954 Vancouver	Coxed four

Roderick Alan Fitzjohn MacMillan (2 May 1928 – 3 August 2006), known as John MacMillan, was a British rower who competed at the 1952 Summer Olympics.

== Biography ==
MacMillan was educated at Winchester School and studied law at New College, Oxford. At the 1952 Olympic Games in Helsinki, MacMillan participated in the men's coxed four event.

He represented the English team at the 1954 British Empire and Commonwealth Games held in Vancouver, Canada, where he won the silver medal in the eights event and a bronze medal in the coxed fours, both as part of the Thames Rowing Club.
