= Raymond Penney =

English rower

Personal information
- Nationality: British (English)
- Born: 7 August 1937 Hampstead, London< England
- Died: First quarter 1992 (aged 54) Fulham, London, England

Sport
- Sport: Rowing
- Club: Thames Rowing Club
Medal record
Rowing
Representing England
British Empire & Commonwealth Games
Bronze medal – third place	1958 Cardiff	eights

Raymond Leslie Penney (1937–1992) was a male rowing coxswain who competed for England.

== Biography ==
Penney represented the England team and won a bronze medal in the eights event at the 1958 British Empire and Commonwealth Games in Cardiff, Wales.

The eights crew consisted entirely of members of the Thames Rowing Club and who won the final of the Empire Games Trials ahead of the 1st and 3rd Trinity Boat Club, Cambridge.
