= Maurice Legg =

British rower

Personal information
- Nationality: British (English)
- Born: 12 June 1926 Consett, Durham, England
- Died: 6 July 2006 (aged 80) Esher, Surrey, England
- Education: Durham University and the Open University
- Occupation(s): Physicist, Financial Controller
- Employer(s): MITRE, NadgeCo, ESA (Space Lab)

Sport
- Sport: Rowing
- Club: Thames Rowing Club
Medal record
Rowing
Representing England
British Empire & Commonwealth Games
Silver medal – second place	1954 Vancouver	Eights
Bronze medal – third place	1954 Vancouver	Coxed Fours

Maurice Legg (12 June 1926 – 6 July 2006) was a rower who competed for England and Great Britain.

== Biography ==
Legg represented the English team at the 1954 British Empire and Commonwealth Games held in Vancouver, Canada, where he won the silver medal in the eights event and a bronze medal in the coxed fours, both as part of the Thames Rowing Club.

He was also a member of the King's College BC and rowed at bow.
