= Geoffrey Baker (rower) =

English rower

Personal information
- Nationality: British (English)

Sport
- Sport: Rowing
- Club: Marlow Rowing Club
Medal record
Rowing
Representing England
British Empire & Commonwealth Games
Gold medal – first place	1958 Cardiff	double sculls

Geoffrey W Baker is a male former rower who competed for England.

== Biography ==
Baker the England team and won a gold medal in the double sculls with Mike Spracklen, at the 1958 British Empire and Commonwealth Games in Cardiff, Wales.

Baker and Spracklen rowed for Marlow Rowing Club.
