= John Pope (rower) =

British rower

Personal information
- Nationality: British (English)

Sport
- Sport: Rowing
- Club: Thames Rowing Club
Medal record
Rowing
Representing England
British Empire & Commonwealth Games
Silver medal – second place	1954 Vancouver	Eights

John Pope is a male former rower who competed for England.

== Biography ==
Pope represented the English team at the 1954 British Empire and Commonwealth Games held in Vancouver, Canada, where he won the silver medal in the eights event.

He was a member of the Thames Rowing Club.
