= David Young (rower) =

British rower

Personal information
- Nationality: British (English)

Sport
- Sport: Rowing
- Club: National Provincial Bank RC
Medal record
Rowing
Representing England
British Empire & Commonwealth Games
Gold medal – first place	1958 Cardiff	Coxless four

David R. Young is a male former rower who competed for England.

== Biography ==
Young represented the England team and won a gold medal in the coxless four event at the 1958 British Empire and Commonwealth Games in Cardiff, Wales. All four of the gold medal winning crew rowed for the National Provincial Bank Rowing Club.
