= Joe Eldeen =

British

Personal information
- Nationality: British (English)
- Born: 27 July 1923
- Died: 2000 (aged 76–77) Lancaster, Lancashire, England

Sport
- Sport: Rowing
- Club: Thames Rowing Club
Medal record
Rowing
Representing England
British Empire & Commonwealth Games
| Silver medal – second place | 1954 Vancouver | Eights |

Joseph Noor Eldeen (27 July 1923 – 2000), was a male rower who competed for England.

== Biography ==
Eldeen represented the English team at the 1954 British Empire and Commonwealth Games held in Vancouver, Canada, where he won the silver medal in the eights event.

He was a member of the Thames Rowing Club.
