= Richard Gabriel (rower) =

English rower (1927–2006)

Personal information
- Nationality: British (English)
- Born: 30 August 1927
- Died: 10 October 2006 (aged 79)

Sport
- Sport: Rowing
- Club: University College London Boat Club; Barn Cottage RC
Medal record
Rowing
Representing England
British Empire & Commonwealth Games
Gold medal – first place	1958 Cardiff	coxed four

Richard Clair Gabriel (30 August 1927 – 10 October 2006) was an English rower.

== Biography ==
Gabriel represented the England team and won a gold medal in the coxed four event (as the coxswain) at the 1958 British Empire and Commonwealth Games in Cardiff, Wales.

Gabriel was a member of the University College London Boat Club.

Gabriel died on 10 October 2006, at the age of 79.
