= Russell Carver =

English rower (1934–2026)

Russell Dempster Carver
Personal information
- Nationality: British (English)
- Born: 1934 Colony and Protectorate of Kenya
- Died: 30 October 2026 (aged 91)

Sport
- Sport: Rowing
- Club: First and Third Trinity Boat Club
Medal record
Rowing
Representing England
British Empire & Commonwealth Games
Bronze medal – third place	1958 Cardiff	single sculls

Russell Dempster Carver (1934 – 30 October 2026) was a male rower who competed for England.

== Biography ==
Carver represented the England team and won a bronze medal in the single sculls event at the 1958 British Empire and Commonwealth Games in Cardiff, Wales.

He rowed for Trinity College, Cambridge and Eton College Boat Club and rowed against Oxford in the 1958 boat race.

His father Humphrey Roberton Carver also rowed for Cambridge in the 1922 and 1925 races respectively. Russell was born in late 1934 in Kenya, because his father was a civil servant working there at the time. The family moved back to England in 1935 to live at Boldre Bridge House, Lymington, Hampshire.

Carver died on 30 October 2026, aged 91.
