= Rhodes Hambridge =

Australian-born British rower (1913–1993)

Personal information
- Nationality: British/Australian
- Born: 29 October 1913 New South Wales, Australia
- Died: 29 September 1993 (aged 79) Cumbria, England

Sport
- Club: London Rowing Club
Medal record
Rowing
Representing England
British Empire Games
Gold medal – first place	1938 Sydney	Eights

Rhodes Hambridge (29 October 1913 – 29 September 1993) was an Australian born rower who represented England at the British Empire Games.

== Biography ==
Hambridge was born in New South Wales, Australia and rowed for the London Rowing Club.

He represented England at the 1938 British Empire Games and won a gold medal in the eights event at the 1938 British Empire Games in Sydney, Australia. A medical student at the time, he later became a physician and lived on Teesdale Avenue, Isleworth.
