= Mick Allan =

Australian rower (1938–2021)

Personal information
- Born: 25 June 1938 New South Wales, Australia
- Died: 23 October 2021 (aged 83)
- Height: 6 ft 2.5 in (189.2 cm)
- Weight: 185 lb (84 kg)

Sport
- Club: Mosman Rowing Club; Sydney Rowing Club

Achievements and titles
- Olympic finals: Coxed four Rome 1960
- National finals: King's Cup 1959–64
Medal record
Men's rowing
Representing Australia
Commonwealth Games
Silver medal – second place	1958 Cardiff	Men's eight
Bronze medal – third place	1958 Cardiff	Men's four

Graeme Keith Allan (25 June 1938 – 23 October 2021) was an Australian representative rower who competed at two Olympic Games and won two Commonwealth Games medals.

== Club and state rowing ==
Mick Allan learnt to row in a tub pair on the waters of Sydney's Middle Harbour. His first coach was Fred Evans a 1929 King's Cup winning Mosman oarsman. Allan's senior rowing was initially from the Mosman Rowing Club and later the Sydney Rowing Club.

State selection for Allan first came in 1959 when he was picked at five in the New South Wales senior eight which contested and won the King's Cup at the Interstate Championships held in Perth. In 1960 Allan's state champion Mosman Rowing Club senior eight was selected in toto as the New South Wales crew to contest the King's Cup in Launceston. They placed second to WA. Allan held his seat in the New South Wales men's eight for the Kings Cup contests of 1961, 1962, 1963 and 1964.

In 1961 a three race Trans-Tasman test series was held against New Zealand to help both counties crews gain international experience. An all Mosman Rowing Club won the selection trials held by the New South Wales Rowing Association for the right to represent. Allen was in the seven seat of the Australian eight who were beaten in all three match races in New Zealand.

At the inaugural Australian Rowing Championships in 1962 Allan contested the coxless four championships title in Sydney Rowing Club colours. That crew placed second and missed selection for the 1962 Commonwealth Games. At the 1964 Australian Championships Allan competed for both the coxless and coxed four championship and in a Sydney crew won the coxed four title and with it, selection for the Tokyo Olympics. His last Australian Championships appearance was in 1966 when he contested the coxed pair.

== International representative rowing ==
Selection racing for the 1958 Cardiff Commonwealth Games was conducted in January 1958 and New South Wales oarsmen and combinations dominated. The New South Wales eight was selected in toto to race as the Australian eight with Allan in the seven seat. In Cardiff the eight rowed to a silver medal and four of the crew with Allan at three also raced as a coxed four and took a bronze medal.

For the 1960 Rome Olympics the Australian eight was the winning King's Cup West Australian eight. A coxed four was selected as the fourth priority boat and a New South Wales four was picked with Allan in the two seat. In Rome they were the only Australian crew to make the Olympic final and finished in fifth place.

At the 1964 Tokyo Olympics Allan again represented Australia in the two seat of an all Sydney Rowing Club men's coxed four. They placed tenth.

== Personal ==
Allan was a carpenter with the construction firm Kell & Rigby. It was work travel pressures which prompted his shift from the Mosman Rowing Club to the Sydney Rowing Club midway through his peak rowing years. Allan died on 23 October 2021, at the age of 83.
