= Norm Suckling =

New Zealand rower

Personal information
- Born: Norman Suckling; 14 January 1938 Cambridge, New Zealand
- Died: 10 October 1964 (aged 26)

Sport
- Country: New Zealand
- Sport: Rowing
- Club: Cambridge Rowing Club
Medal record
Men's rowing
Representing New Zealand
British Empire and Commonwealth Games
| Bronze medal – third place | 1958 Cardiff | Double sculls |

Norman Suckling (14 January 1938 – 10 October 1964) was a New Zealand rower who won a bronze medal representing his country at the 1958 British Empire and Commonwealth Games

== Biography ==
Born in Cambridge on 14 January 1938, Suckling was the son of Dorothy Maud Suckling (née Cox) and Phillip Willway Suckling. He took up rowing at the age of 16, joining the Cambridge Rowing Club.

Suckling competed at 1958 British Empire and Commonwealth Games in the men's double scull, partnering James Hill to win the bronze medal, and becoming the first Cambridge athlete to represent New Zealand at an Empire or Commonwealth games.

Suckling died on 10 October 1964, after suffering a heart attack while mowing the lawn, and was buried at Hamilton Park Cemetery. He was survived by his wife, Jennry, and their two children.
