= John Vigurs =

British rower

Personal information
- Born: 21 March 1930 Perth, Scotland
- Died: 7 September 1994 (aged 64) Lambeth, London, England

Sport
- Sport: Rowing
- Club: London RC / Barn Cottage
Medal record
Rowing
Representing England
British Empire & Commonwealth Games
Gold medal – first place	1958 Cardiff	coxed four
Bronze medal – third place	1962 Perth	coxed four
Bronze medal – third place	1962 Perth	eights

John Phillip Chambre Vigurs (21 March 1930 – 7 September 1994) was a British rower who competed at the 1960 Summer Olympics.

== Biography ==
Vigurs represented the England team and won a gold medal in the coxed four event at the 1958 British Empire and Commonwealth Games in Cardiff, Wales.

At the 1960 Olympic Games in Rome, Vigurs competed in the men's coxless four event.

Two years later he won double bronze in the coxed four and eights at the 1962 British Empire and Commonwealth Games held in Perth, Western Australia.
