= Murray Buswell =

English swimmer

Personal information
- Nationality: English
- Born: 1962 (age 62–63) Great Yarmouth, Norfolk

Murray Buswell (born 1962), is a male former swimmer who competed for Great Britain and England.

== Swimming career ==
Buswell became National champion in 1984 when he won the 1984 ASA National Championship title in the 200 metres breaststroke.

Buswell represented England in the 200 metres breaststroke event, at the 1986 Commonwealth Games in Edinburgh, Scotland. He also represented Great Britain at the 1985 European Aquatics Championships.
