= Croydon Harriers =

British athletics club

- Founded: 1920
- Ground: Croydon Sports Arena
- Location: Albert Road, London SE25 4QL, England
- Coordinates: 51°23′36″N 0°03′38″W
- Website: official website

Croydon Harriers is an athletics club based in Croydon, London, England and is located at Croydon Sports Arena. The club caters for all age groups.

== History ==
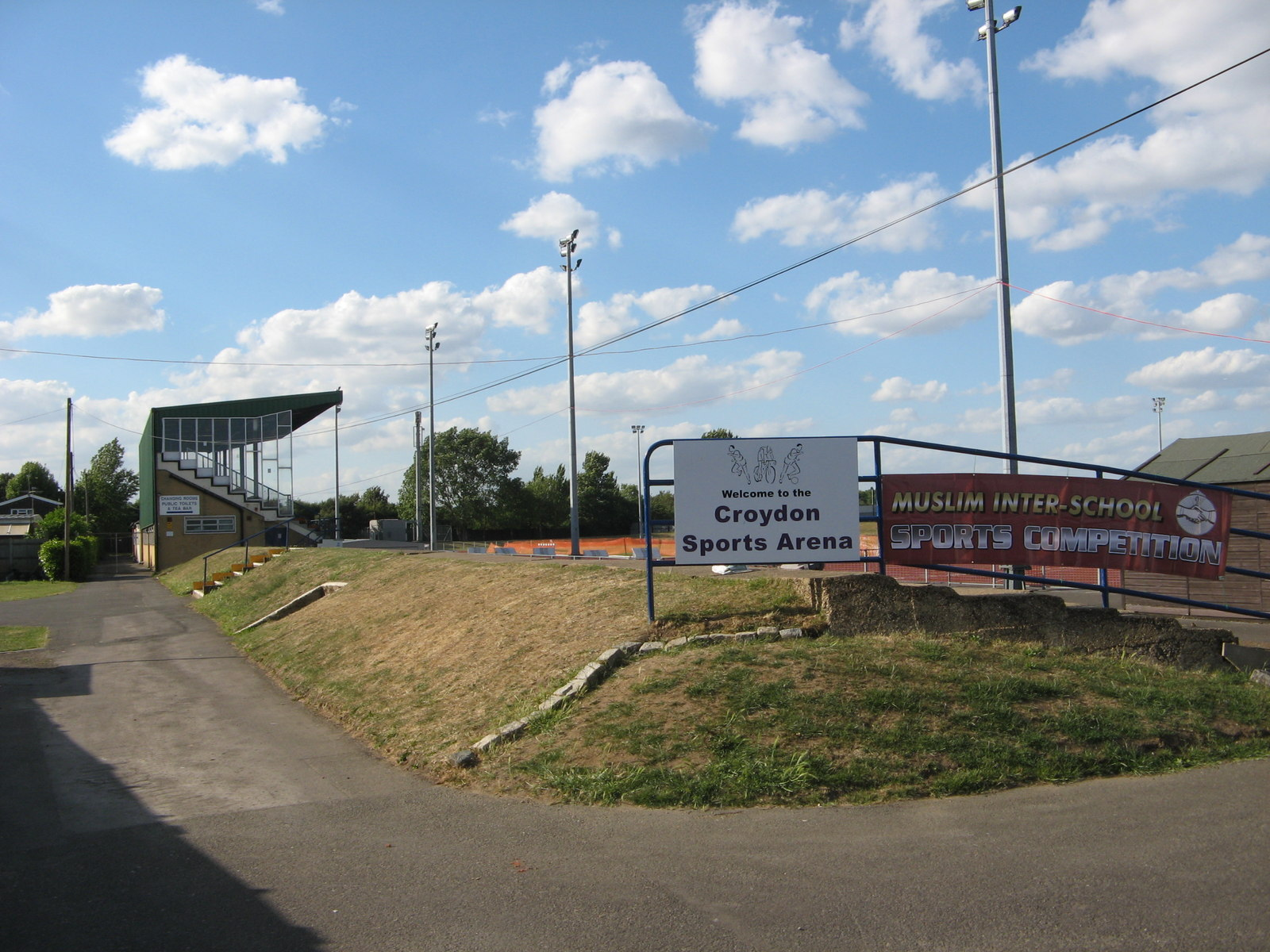
Croydon Sports Arena in 2011

Although the club is listed as being was founded in 1920 it could be considered more of a revival than a founding. There is evidence of a Croydon Harriers club forming in December 1909 when the first AGM was held at Horniman Hall, North-end to elect officers and to organise runs. The club existed for at least three years and previous to this the South Croydon Harriers had existed from at least 1894.

The Harriers moved to the Croydon Sports Arena in 1953 following its construction. The first athletics meeting was held on 15 July 1953 in front of a 4,000 attendance.

== Notable athletes ==
=== Olympians ===
Athlete	Events	Games	Medals
Shirley Cawley	long jump	1952	Bronze medal
Paul Nihill	20 km walk, 50 km walk	1964, 1968, 1972, 1976	Silver medal
Helen Barnett-Burkart	400 metres, 4 × 400 m relay	1984, 1992	
Judy Oakes	shot put	1984, 1988, 1996, 2000	
Mary Berkeley	long jump	1988	
Lea Haggett	high jump	1996	
Donna Fraser	400 m, 4 × 400 m relay	1996, 2000, 2004	
Martyn Rooney	400 m, 4 × 400 m relay	2008, 2012	
Lawrence Okoye	discus throw	2012	
James Dasaolu	100 metres	2012	
