= The Boat Race 1958 =

104th Boat Race
- Date: 5 April 1958
- Winner: Cambridge
- Margin of victory: 3 1/2 lengths
- Winning time: 18 minutes 15 seconds
- Overall record (Cambridge–Oxford): 58–45
- Umpire: Kenneth Payne (Cambridge)

The 104th Boat Race took place on 5 April 1958. Held annually, the Boat Race is a side-by-side rowing race between crews from the Universities of Oxford and Cambridge along the River Thames. The race was umpired by former Cambridge rower Kenneth Payne and featured the first cox to follow his father in steering one of the boats. The reigning champions Cambridge won by 3 1/2 lengths in a time of 18 minutes 15 seconds, the third-fastest winning time in history, and took the overall record to 58–45 in their favour.

== Background ==
The Boat Race is a side-by-side rowing competition between the University of Oxford (sometimes referred to as the "Dark Blues") and the University of Cambridge (sometimes referred to as the "Light Blues"). First held in 1829, the race takes place on the 4.2-mile (6.8 km) Championship Course on the River Thames in southwest London. The rivalry is a major point of honour between the two universities and followed throughout the United Kingdom and broadcast worldwide. Cambridge went into the race as reigning champions, having won the 1957 race by two lengths, and led overall with 57 victories to Oxford's 45 (excluding the "dead heat" of 1877).

Cambridge were coached by J. R. F. Best, James Crowden (who rowed twice for Cambridge, in the 1951 and 1952 races), Brian Lloyd (a three-time Blue, rowing in the 1949, 1950 and 1951 races), J. R. Owen (who rowed in the 1959 and 1960 races) and Harold Rickett (three-time Blue between 1930 and 1932). Oxford's coaches were Hugh "Jumbo" Edwards (who rowed for Oxford in the 1926 and 1930 races), J. H. Page, C. F. Porter and L. A. F. Stokes (who rowed in the 1951 and 1952 races. The race was umpired for the sixth time by the former British Olympian Kenneth Payne, who had rowed for Cambridge in the 1932 and 1934 races.

In the buildup to the race, Cambridge's P. D. Rickett was struck down by influenza for a week and was unable to train.

== Crews ==
The Cambridge crew weighed an average of 13 st 3 lb (83.7 kg), 3 pounds (1.4 kg) per rower more than their opponents. Oxford's crew had two rowers with Boat Race experience, including stroke G. Sorrell (who was rowing in his third race) and number four S. F. A. Miskin. Cambridge saw a single participant return in number three J. A. Pitchford. Two of the participants in the race were registered as non-British. Oxford's number six, Rodd Rubin, hailed from America while Cambridge's number five R. B. Ritchie was Australian.

Cambridge's James Sulley became the first cox to follow in his father's footsteps: A. L. "Jimmy" Sulley steered the Light Blues in the 1928 race. Peter Rickett, the Light Blues' number six, also followed his father (and coach for this year) Harold, while R. B. Ritchie's father A. B. Ritchie and Russell Carver's father Humphrey Roberton Carver also rowed for Cambridge, in the 1922 and 1925 races respectively. Oxford's stroke, David Edwards was the son of coach Hugh "Jumbo" Edwards who rowed in the 1930 race while P. D. Rickett's father and coach Harold rowed in three races for Cambridge, from 1930 to 1932.

| Seat | Oxford | | | Cambridge | | |
| Seat | Name | College | Weight | Name | College | Weight |
|---|---|---|---|---|---|---|
| Bow | G. Sorrell (P) | Christ Church | 11 st 13 lb | A. T. Denby | Magdalene | 12 st 4 lb |
| 2 | M. J. W. Hall | Lincoln | 12 st 5 lb | J. R. Giles | Emmanuel | 12 st 7 lb |
| 3 | J. H. Ducker | St Edmund Hall | 12 st 13 lb | J. A. Pitchford (P) | Christ's | 13 st 10 lb |
| 4 | S. F. A. Miskin | University | 12 st 3 lb | R. D. Carver | 1st & 3rd Trinity | 13 st 3 lb |
| 5 | F. D. M. Badcock | Christ Church | 13 st 3 lb | R. B. Ritchie | Corpus Christi | 14 st 2 lb |
| 6 | R. Rubin | Merton | 14 st 8 lb | P. D. Rickett | 1st & 3rd Trinity | 13 st 6 lb |
| 7 | J. L. Fage | St Edmund Hall | 12 st 13 lb | D. C. Christie | Pembroke | 13 st 12 lb |
| Stroke | D. C. R. Edwards | Christ Church | 13 st 2 lb | M. B. Maltby | Pembroke | 12 st 9 lb |
| Cox | J. G. Rowbotham | Hertford | 9 st 0 lb | J. S. Sulley | Selwyn | 8 st 8 lb |
Source: (P) – boat club president

== Race ==
The Championship Course along which the Boat Race is contested

Cambridge, who went into the race as favourites, won the toss and elected to start from the Surrey station, handing the Middlesex side of the river to Oxford. In conditions described in The Times as "wretched" with fog and rain, the race started at 1:30 p.m. Although Oxford out-rated Cambridge, the Light Blues' length of stroke saw them hold a three-quarter length lead after the first minute. Continuing to pull away, Cambridge were clear by Beverley Brook, half a length clear by the time the crews passed Craven Steps and increased this to a length and a half by the Mile Post.

A spurt from Oxford at the Crab Tree pub made no impression on the lead. Oxford were still out-rating by Cambridge three strokes per minute as they passed below Hammersmith Bridge, two lengths adrift of the Light Blues. By Chiswick Steps, the lead was three lengths where Cambridge saw off another spurt, with Oxford now rowing six strokes per minute faster than their opponents. Able to relax, Cambridge passed the finishing post three and a half lengths clear of Oxford in a time of 18 minutes 15 seconds, the third fastest winning time in the event's history. It was Cambridge's fourth consecutive victory and the fastest winning time since the 1948 race. A correspondent writing in The Times described the victory as a "great success" and attributed the win to Cambridge's "uniformity, precision, and properly covered blades ... not to the brilliance of any individuals in the boat." Jack Beresford, writing in The Observer, suggested that Cambridge's crew was "as good as any since the war" but that while Oxford "rowed gallantly and never gave up", their technique was inadequate.

== International selection ==
Jonathan Hall and Francis David Badcock (from Oxford) and Russell Carver (from Cambridge) were all selected for the England team for the 1958 British Empire and Commonwealth Games later in the year; Badcock was a reserve for the eights.
