= Peter Waddington (rower) =

Australian rower (1937–2022)

Personal information
- Full name: Peter Roland Waddington
- Nationality: Australian
- Born: 13 January 1937 Sydney, Australia
- Died: 24 June 2022 (aged 85)

Sport
- Sport: rowing
- Club: Leichhardt Rowing Club

Achievements and titles
- Olympic finals: Coxed four Rome 1960
- National finals: King's Cup 1959–60
Medal record
Men's rowing
Representing Australia
Commonwealth Games
| Silver medal – second place | 1958 Cardiff | Men's eight |
| Bronze medal – third place | 1958 Cardiff | Men's four |

Peter Roland Waddington (13 January 1937 – 24 June 2022) was an Australian former representative rower. He competed in the men's coxed four event at the 1960 Summer Olympics and won two medals at the 1958 Commonwealth Games.

== Club and state rowing ==
Waddington took up rowing at Sydney Church of England Grammar School (Shore) where he was educated from 1949-1954.Death Notice Shore alumni His senior club rowing was in Sydney from the Leichhardt Rowing Club.

Waddington's first state selection was as a reserve in the 1956 New South Wales state representative men's senior eights contesting the King's Cup at the Interstate Regatta within the Australian Rowing Championships. He rowed in the 1959 and 1960 New South Wales King's Cup eights, stroking the 1959 NSW eight crew to victory.

== International representative rowing ==
Selection racing for the 1958 Cardiff Commonwealth Games was conducted in January 1958, and New South Wales oarsmen and combinations dominated. The New South Wales eight was selected in toto to race as the Australian eight with Waddington in the six seat. In Cardiff, the eight rowed to a silver medal, and four of the crew, with Waddington seated at three, also raced as a coxed four and took a bronze medal.

For the 1960 Rome Olympics, the Australian eight was the winning King's Cup West Australian eight. A coxed four was selected as the fourth priority boat and a New South Wales four was picked with Waddington in the three seat. In Rome, they were the only Australian crew to make the Olympic final and finished in fifth place.
