= Colin Porter (rower) =

British rower (1930–2020)

Personal information
- Nationality: British (English)
- Born: 11 October 1930 London, England
- Died: 21 August 2020 (aged 89) Bassendean, Perth, Western Australia

Sport
- Sport: Rowing
- Club: Barn Cottage RC; Molesey BC
Medal record
Rowing
Representing England
British Empire & Commonwealth Games
Gold medal – first place	1958 Cardiff	coxed four
Bronze medal – third place	1962 Perth	coxed four
Bronze medal – third place	1962 Perth	eights

Colin Francis Porter (11 October 1930 – 21 August 2020) was a British rower who competed at the 1960 Summer Olympics.

== Biography ==
Porter represented the England team and won a gold medal in the coxed four event at the 1958 British Empire and Commonwealth Games in Cardiff, Wales.

At the 1960 Olympic Games in Rome, Porter competed in the men's coxless four event.

Two years later he represented the England team at the 1962 British Empire and Commonwealth Games in Perth, Western Australia. He competed in the coxed four and eights, winning two bronze medals.
