= Bob Parker (rower) =

New Zealand rower (1934–2009)

Personal information
- Born: Robert Hugh Parker; 29 September 1934 Auckland, New Zealand
- Died: 29 August 2009 (aged 74) Coopers Beach, New Zealand
- Spouse: Raywin Morris (m. 1962)
Medal record
Men's rowing
Representing New Zealand
British Empire and Commonwealth Games
Gold medal – first place	1954 Vancouver	Coxless pair
Gold medal – first place	1958 Cardiff	Coxless pair
Silver medal – second place	1954 Vancouver	Double sculls

Robert Hugh Parker (29 September 1934 – 29 August 2009) was a New Zealand rower who represented his country at two British Empire and Commonwealth Games and one Olympic Games.

Born in Auckland on 29 September 1934, Parker was a junior rower at the Mercer Rowing Club when he teamed up with Reg Douglas in the double scull in 1952. In 1954 the duo won both the double scull and the coxless pair at the New Zealand Rowing Championships in Picton.

At both the 1954 British Empire and Commonwealth Games in Vancouver and 1958 British Empire and Commonwealth Games in Cardiff, Parker and Douglas combined to win the gold medal in the men's coxless pair. The combination also won the silver medal in the men's double sculls at the Vancouver games.

Parker and Douglas also competed together at the 1956 Summer Olympics in Melbourne, finishing third in their semi-final in the coxless pair, missing out in a place in the final.

In 1962, Parker married Raywin Morris at Tuakau. He died at Coopers Beach on 29 August 2009.
