= Reg Douglas =

New Zealand rower (1930–2025)

Personal information
- Born: Reginald Alexander Douglas; 19 April 1930 Auckland, New Zealand
- Died: 20 February 2025 (aged 94) Cromwell, New Zealand
Medal record
Men's rowing
Representing New Zealand
British Empire and Commonwealth Games
Gold medal – first place	1954 Vancouver	Coxless pair
Gold medal – first place	1958 Cardiff	Coxless pair
Silver medal – second place	1954 Vancouver	Double Sculls

Reginald Alexander Douglas (19 April 1930 – 20 February 2025) was a New Zealand rower.

== Biography ==
Douglas was born in Auckland on 19 April 1930. At both the 1954 and 1958 British Empire and Commonwealth Games, he won the gold medal in the men's coxless pair alongside Bob Parker. He also won the silver medal in the men's double sculls with Parker at the 1954 British Empire Games.

Douglas and Parker also competed together at the 1956 Summer Olympics in Melbourne, finishing third in their semi-final in the coxless pair, missing out in a place in the final.

In September 2023, Douglas was acknowledged as New Zealand's oldest living Olympian. He died in Cromwell on 20 February 2025, at the age of 94.
