= Boxing at the 1962 British Empire and Commonwealth Games =

- Venue: Perry Lakes Basketball Stadium
- Location: Perth, Australia
- Dates: 22 November to 1 December 1962

Boxing at the 1962 British Empire and Commonwealth Games was the seventh appearance of the Boxing at the Commonwealth Games. The events were held in Perth, Australia, and featured contests in ten weight classes.

The boxing events were held in the Perry Lakes Basketball Stadium. Ghana topped the boxing medal table by virtue of winning two gold medals and four silver medals. Albert Turmel won the first Commonwealth Games medal ever for Jersey.

== Medal table ==
* Host nation (Australia)

Medals won by nation with totals, ranked by number of golds—sortable
Rank	Nation	Gold	Silver	Bronze	Total
1	Ghana	2	4	0	6
2	Scotland	2	1	1	4
3	Australia	2	0	2	4
4	New Zealand	1	1	2	4
4	Uganda	1	1	2	4
6	Canada	1	0	1	2
7	Jamaica	1	0	0	1
8	England	0	1	4	5
9	Kenya	0	1	1	2
10	Rhodesia and Nyasaland	0	1	0	1
11	Fiji	0	0	2	2
12	Jersey	0	0	1	1
12	Northern Ireland	0	0	1	1
12	Papua and New Guinea	0	0	1	1
Totals (14 entries)		10	10	18	38

== Medallists ==
Weight	Gold	Silver	Bronze
Flyweight	Bobby Mallon (SCO)	Isaac Aryee (GHA)	Philip Waruinge (KEN), Mike Pye (ENG)
Bantamweight	Jeff Dynevor (AUS)	Sammy Abbey (GHA)	John Sentongo (UGA), Peter Benneyworth (ENG)
Featherweight	John McDermott (SCO)	Ali Juma (KEN)	Turori George (NZL), Ted Stone (AUS)
Lightweight	Eddie Blay (GHA)	Kesi Odongo (UGA)	Paddy Donovan (NZL), Brian Whelan (ENG)
Light Welterweight	Clement Quartey (GHA)	Dick McTaggart (SCO)	Harvey Reti (CAN), Brian Brazier (ENG)
Welterweight	Wallace Coe (NZL)	John Pritchett (ENG)	Albert Turmel (JER)
Light Middleweight	Harold Mann (CAN)	Brian Benson (FRN)	Frank Nyangweso (UGA), Kenneth Hopkins (PNG)
Middleweight	Cephas Colquhoun (JAM)	Thomas Arimi (GHA)	Moses Evans (FIJ)
Light Heavyweight	Tony Madigan (AUS)	Jojo Miles (GHA)	Ivan Christie (NIR), Tom Menzies (SCO)
Heavyweight	George Oywello (UGA)	Bill Kini (NZL)	Holgar Johansen (FIJ), Graham Robinson (AUS)

== Results ==
=== Flyweight 51kg ===
Round	Winner	Loser	Score
Quarter-Final	(England) Mike Pye	(Australia) Eddie Barney	PTS
Quarter-Final	(Kenya) Philip Waruinge	(Uganda) John Wandera	PTS
Quarter-Final	(Scotland) Bobby Mallon	(Pakistan) A. Akbar	PTS
Semifinal	(Ghana) Isaac Aryee	(England) Mike Pye	TKOI 3
Semifinal	(Scotland) Bobby Mallon	(Kenya) Philip Waruinge	PTS
Final	(Scotland) Bobby Mallon	(Ghana) Isaac Aryee	PTS

=== Bantamweight 54kg ===
Round	Winner	Loser	Score
Quarter-Final	(Australia) Jeffrey Dynevor	(Papua New Guinea) M.Soong Sisiu	PTS
Quarter-Final	(Ghana) Sammy Abbey	(Pakistan) Sher Zaman	KO 3
Quarter-Final	(Uganda) John Sentongo	(Northern Ireland) Pat Fitzsimmons	PTS
Semifinal	(Ghana) Sammy Abbey	(England) Peter Benneyworth	PTS
Semifinal	(Australia) Jeffrey Dynevor	(Uganda) John Sentongo	PTS
Final	(Australia) Jeffrey Dynevor	(Ghana) Sammy Abbey	PTS

=== Featherweight 57kg ===
Round	Winner	Loser	Score
Quarter-Final	(Australia) Ted Stone	(Wales) Ronnie Lendrum	PTS
Quarter-Final	(Scotland) John McDermott	(Pakistan) M. Ashraf	PTS
Quarter-Final	(Kenya) Ali Juma	(Ghana) Aaron Popoola	PTS
Quarter-Final	(New Zealand) Toro George	(Federation of Rhodesia and Nyasaland) William Pretorius	PTS
Semifinal	(Scotland) John McDermott	(Australia) Ted Stone	PTS
Semifinal	(Kenya) Ali Juma	(New Zealand) Toro George	PTS
Final	(Scotland) John McDermott	(Kenya) Ali Juma	PTS

=== Lightweight 60kg ===
Round	Winner	Loser	Score
Prelim	(Uganda) Kesi Odongo	(Canada) M. McMillan	PTS
Prelim	(Pakistan) Ghulam Sarwar	(Fiji) L. Naiula	PTS
Prelim	(England) Brian Whelan	(Jersey) D. Delbridge	PTS
Prelim	(Australia) Adrian Blair	(Dominion of Ceylon) Malcolm Bulner	PTS
Quarter-Final	(Ghana) Eddie Blay	(Wales) Brian Renney	PTS
Quarter-Final	(New Zealand) Paddy Donovan	(Papua New Guinea) T. Hopkins	KO 1
Quarter-Final	(Uganda) Kesi Odongo	(Pakistan) Ghulam Sarwar	PTS
Quarter-Final	(England) Brian Whelan	(Australia) Adrian Blair	PTS
Semifinal	(Ghana) Eddie Blay	(New Zealand) Paddy Donovan	PTS
Semifinal	(Uganda) Kesi Odongo	(England) Brian Whelan	WO
Final	(Ghana) Eddie Blay	(Uganda) Kesi Odongo	PTS

=== Light Welterweight 63.5kg ===
Round	Winner	Loser	Score
Prelim	(Wales) Geoff Rees	(Papua New Guinea) A. Maira	KO 1
Prelim	(Northern Ireland) Bernie Meli	(Pakistan) Haider Zaman	KO 2
Prelim	(Canada) Harvey Reti	(Australia) Joseph Rossi	PTS
Quarter-Final	(Ghana) Clement Quartey	(Federation of Rhodesia and Nyasaland) Jaggie van Staden	KO 3
Quarter-Final	(England) Brian Brazier	(Kenya) Gichere Gakungu	PTS
Quarter-Final	(Scotland) Dick McTaggart	(Wales) Geoff Rees	PTS
Quarter-Final	(Canada) Harvey Reti	(Northern Ireland) Bernie Meli	PTS
Semifinal	(Ghana) Clement Quartey	(England) Brian Brazier	PTS
Semifinal	(Scotland) Dick McTaggart	(Canada) Harvey Reti	PTS
Final	(Ghana) Clement Quartey	(Scotland) Dick McTaggart	PTS

=== Welterweight 67kg ===
Round	Winner	Loser	Score
Quarter-Final	(Jersey) Albert Turmel	(Uganda) D. Ochodomuge	PTS
Quarter-Final	(England) Johnny Pritchett	(Ghana) Joe Darkey	PTS
Quarter-Final	(New Zealand) Wally Coe	(Pakistan) Muhammad Sharaf	PTS
Quarter-Final	(Northern Ireland) Charlie Rice	(Australia) James Peter Kewin	PTS
Semifinal	(England) Johnny Pritchett	(Jersey) Albert Turmel	KO 2
Semifinal	(New Zealand) Wally Coe	(Northern Ireland) Charlie Rice	DQ 2
Final	(New Zealand) Wally Coe	(England) Johnny Pritchett	PTS

=== Light Middleweight 71kg ===
Round	Winner	Loser	Score
Quarter-Final	(Uganda) Frank Nyangweso	(Australia) Gerald Freeman	PTS
Semifinal	(Federation of Rhodesia and Nyasaland) Bernard Benson	(Territory of Papua and New Guinea) Kenneth Hopkins	PTS
Semifinal	(Canada) Harold Mann	(Uganda) Frank Nyangweso	PTS
Final	(Canada) Harold Mann	(Federation of Rhodesia and Nyasaland) Bernard Benson	KO 3

=== Middleweight 75kg ===
Round	Winner	Loser	Score
Prelim	(Uganda) Peter Odhiambo	(Scotland) John Fisher	PTS
Prelim	(Australia) John Bukowski	(England) Alf Matthews	PTS
Quarter-Final	(Fiji) Moses Evans	(Canada) R. Jones	PTS
Quarter-Final	(Jamaica) Milo Calhoun	(Pakistan) Sultan Mahmoud	PTS
Quarter-Final	(Ghana) Thomas Arimi	(Northern Ireland) Barney Wilson	PTS
Quarter-Final	(Australia) John Bukowski	(Uganda) Peter Odhiambo	WO
Semifinal	(Jamaica) Milo Calhoun	(Fiji) Moses Evans	PTS
Semifinal	(Ghana) Thomas Arimi	(Australia) John Bukowski	DQ 3
Final	(Jamaica) Milo Calhoun	(Ghana) Thomas Arimi	PTS

=== Light Heavyweight 81kg ===
Round	Winner	Loser	Score
Prelim	(Northern Ireland) Ivan Christie	(Canada) L.Fredericks	PTS
Prelim	(Jamaica) Ronald Holmes	(New Zealand) John Logan	PTS
Prelim	(Australia) Tony Madigan	(Wales) Dave Paley	KO 2
Quarter-Final	(Scotland) Tom Menzies	(Fiji) J. Tukana	PTS
Quarter-Final	(Ghana) Jojo Miles	(England) Dennis Pollard	PTS
Quarter-Final	(Northern Ireland) Ivan Christie	(Federation of Rhodesia and Nyasaland) P. Gibson	PTS
Quarter-Final	(Australia) Tony Madigan	(Jamaica) Ronald Holmes	DQ 3
Semifinal	(Ghana) Jojo Miles	(Scotland) Tom Menzies	PTS
Semifinal	(Australia) Tony Madigan	(Northern Ireland) Ivan Christie	KO 3
Final	(Australia) Tony Madigan	(Ghana) Jojo Miles	PTS

=== Heavyweight +81kg ===
Round	Winner	Loser	Score
Quarter-Final	(Uganda) George Oywello	(Wales) Rocky James	DQ 3
Semifinal	(New Zealand) Bill Kini	(Australia) Graham Robinson	PTS
Semifinal	(Uganda) George Oywello	(Fiji) Holgar Johansen	PTS
Final	(Uganda) George Oywello	(New Zealand) Bill Kini	PTS
