= Gadi Ado =

Ugandan sprinter

Personal information
- Nationality: Ugandan
- Born: 14 June 1940 (age 86) Arua, Uganda

Sport
- Sport: Sprinting
- Event: 400 metres

Gadi Ado (born 14 June 1940 in Arua) is a Ugandan sprinter who competed in the men's 400 metres at the 1960 Summer Olympics in Rome. Ado competed in the 440 yards at the 1962 British Empire and Commonwealth Games, not progressing past the heats.

== Career ==
Ado emerged as a key figure in Uganda's athletics landscape in the late 1950's participating in domestic competitions. The Uganda Amateur Athletics Association organized national events that identified top talents for international representation where was Ado selected for the 1960 Olympic team.Ado participated in the 1962 British Empire and Common Wealth games in Perth, Australia but was eliminated in the heats of the 440m yards event.

== See also ==
- William Kamanyi
- Frank Kisekka
- John Sentongo
- Frank Nyangweso
