= Polycarp Kibuuka Kakooza =

- Born: 12 April 1912
- Died: 12 January 2003; Kampala, Uganda
- Resting place: St Stephen's Church, Kabowa
- Other name: Polycarp Kakooza
- Citizenship: Ugandan
- Education: King's College, Budo; Makerere University
- Occupations: Clergyman; educator; composer; musician; author; sports administrator; sportsman
- Known for: Composer of Ekitiibwa kya Buganda
- Notable work: Ekitiibwa kya Buganda
- Office: General Secretary of the National Council of Sports; Chairman of the National Council of Sports
- Predecessor: Hassan Sunderani

Polycarp Kibuuka Kakooza, also known as Polycarp Kakooza, was a Ugandan clergyman, musician, educator, author, sportsman and composer. He composed Ekitiibwa kya Buganda, the official anthem of the Kingdom of Buganda.

== Early life and education background ==
Kakooza was born on 12 April 1912 to Omutaka Katongole Reverend Sseddulaaka Kibuuka and Lukia Naluwagga. He attended King's College Budo before enrolling at Makerere University, where he graduated as a teacher in 1934.

== Career ==
Kakooza began his career as a teacher and was associated with King's College Budo, where he participated in educational and cultural activities. He was later involved in the establishment of Aggrey Memorial School in Bunamwaya following a protest by teachers and students at Budo over the display of a portrait of the British monarch at the school. He served as a games teacher at Aggrey Memorial School during the 1940s.

== Music ==
Kakooza was a composer and composed Ekitiibwa kya Buganda in 1939. The song later became the official anthem of the Kingdom of Buganda. Written in Luganda, the anthem celebrates Buganda and its monarchy. Kakooza also performed the song Omusajja Namusanga, which later became associated with Ugandan musician Elly Wamala.

== Football administration ==
Kakooza served as secretary of the Uganda Football Association from 1949 to 1952. He was also involved in the management of the Uganda national football team. In 1956, he managed the Uganda team during its first overseas tour to England.

In 1962, Kakooza coached the Uganda national team at the Africa Cup of Nations in Ethiopia alongside Samson Yiga. He also served as secretary general of the Uganda Amateur Athletic Association and president of the Uganda Amateur Boxing Association.

In addition, Kakooza served as General Secretary of the National Council of Sports (NCS) from 1971 to 1974, succeeding Hassan Sunderani. He later served as chairman of the NCS from 1979 to 1980.

== Author ==
In 1999 Kakooza published Improving Sports in Uganda, a book on the development and administration of sports in Uganda.

== Death ==
Kakooza died on 12 January 2003 in Kampala at Namirembe Hospital and was buried at St Stephen's Church in Kabowa.

== Honour and recognition ==
Following the restoration of the Kingdom of Buganda in 1993, Kabaka Ronald Muwenda Mutebi II awarded Kakooza the Ekitiibwa ky'Amafumu n'Engabo (Order of the Shield and Spear), a Buganda honour given to individuals who had rendered exceptional service to the kingdom.

== See also ==
- William Kamanyi
- Frank Kisekka
- John Sentongo
- Frank Nyangweso
