= Boxing at the 1960 Summer Olympics – Light middleweight =

Olympic boxing tournament

Light middleweight boxing at the Games of the XVII Olympiad
- Venue: Palazzo dello Sport
- Dates: 25 August – 5 September 1960
- Competitors: 23 from 23 nations

Medalists
1st place, gold medalist(s)		Wilbert McClure	United States
2nd place, silver medalist(s)		Carmelo Bossi	Italy
3rd place, bronze medalist(s)		William Fisher	Great Britain
3rd place, bronze medalist(s)		Boris Lagutin	Soviet Union

The men's light middleweight event was part of the boxing programme at the 1960 Summer Olympics. The weight class allowed boxers of up to 71 kilograms to compete. The competition was held from 25 August to 5 September 1960. 23 boxers from 23 nations competed.

== Competition format ==
The competition was a straight single-elimination tournament, with no bronze medal match (two bronze medals were awarded, one to each semifinal loser).

== Results ==
Results of the light middleweight boxing competition.

=== Top half ===
Round of 16		Quarterfinals		Semifinals
Frank Nyangweso (UGA)	0
Wilbert McClure (USA)	5	Wilbert McClure (USA)	3
Celedonio Lima (ARG)	KO-2	Celedonio Lima (ARG)	2
Jeffrey Alleyne (CAN)	L			Wilbert McClure (USA)	3
Boris Lagutin (URS)	KO-1			Boris Lagutin (URS)	2
Alhassan Brimah (GHA)	L	Boris Lagutin (URS)	KO-2
Abrie Schutte (RSA)	1	John Bukowski (AUS)	L
John Bukowski (AUS)	4

=== Bottom half ===
Round of 32
Dragoslav Jakovljević (YUG)	0
Souleymane Diallo (FRA)	5
Rolf Caroli (EUA)	2
Pedro Votta (URU)	3
Carmelo Bossi (ITA)	5
Brian van Niekerk (RHO)	0
Cesáreo Barrera (ESP)	2
Bas van Duivenbode (NED)	3
William Fisher (GBR)	5
Roy Askevold (NOR)	0
Michael Reid (IRL)	4
Hélio Crescêncio (BRA)	1
Leif Hansen (DEN)	1
Henryk Dampc (POL)	4

Round of 16
Nicolae Stoenescu (ROU)	2
Souleymane Diallo (FRA)	3
Pedro Votta (URU)	1
Carmelo Bossi (ITA)	4
Bas van Duivenbode (NED)	L
William Fisher (GBR)	KO-2
Michael Reid (IRL)	0
Henryk Dampc (POL)	5

Quarter-finals
Souleymane Diallo (FRA)	0
Carmelo Bossi (ITA)	5
William Fisher (GBR)	4
Henryk Dampc (POL)	1

Semi-finals
Carmelo Bossi (ITA)	3
William Fisher (GBR)	2

=== Finals ===
Semifinals
Wilbert McClure (USA)	3
Boris Lagutin (URS)	2
Carmelo Bossi (ITA)	3
William Fisher (GBR)	2

Final
Wilbert McClure (USA)	4
Carmelo Bossi (ITA)	1
