= Luis Aranda =

Argentine boxer

Personal information
- Born: 3 September 1936 (age 89) Santa Fe, Argentina

Sport
- Sport: Boxing
Medal record
Men's amateur boxing
Representing Argentina
Pan American Games
Silver medal – second place	1959 Chicago	Light welterweight

Luis Aranda (born 3 September 1936) is an Argentine boxer. He competed in the men's light welterweight event at the 1960 Summer Olympics. At the 1960 Summer Olympics, he defeated Rogelio Reyes of Mexico, before losing to Piero Brandi of Italy.
