= Charles Rice =

Charles Rice may refer to:

- Charles Rice (fireman) (1840–1895), US Navy fireman and Medal of Honor recipient
- Charles Rice (general) (1787–1863), politician and officer in Massachusetts militia
- Charles Rice (sound engineer), sound engineer
- C. Allen Thorndike Rice (1851–1889), American author and publisher
- Charles E. Rice (1931–2015), American legal scholar
- Charles Francis Rice (1851–1927), American Methodist minister
- Charles M. Rice (born 1952), American virologist
- Charles Owen Rice (1908–2005), Roman Catholic priest and American labor activist
- Charles Spring Rice, 5th Baron Monteagle of Brandon (1887–1946), Anglo-Irish peer
- Charles Rice (rugby league) (1907–1993), Australian rugby league player
- Charlie Rice (Charles R. Rice, 1920–2018), American jazz drummer

== See also ==
- Charles Rice Ames House, a residence in Belpre, Ohio, United States
- Charlie Rice (boxer) (born c. 1943), boxer from Northern Ireland
