= Boxing at the 1960 Summer Olympics – Light welterweight =

Olympic boxing tournament

Light welterweight boxing at the Games of the XVII Olympiad
- Venue: Palazzo dello Sport
- Dates: 25 August – 5 September 1960
- Competitors: 34 from 34 nations

Medalists
1st place, gold medalist(s)		Bohumil Němeček	Czechoslovakia
2nd place, silver medalist(s)		Clement Quartey	Ghana
3rd place, bronze medalist(s)		Quincey Daniels	United States
3rd place, bronze medalist(s)		Marian Kasprzyk	Poland

The men's light welterweight event was part of the boxing programme at the 1960 Summer Olympics. The weight class allowed boxers of up to 63.5 kilograms to compete. The competition was held from 25 August to 5 September 1960. 34 boxers from 34 nations competed.

== Competition format ==
The competition was a single-elimination tournament, with no bronze medal match (two bronze medals were awarded, one to each semifinal loser).

== Results ==
Results of the light welterweight boxing competition.

=== Top half ===
Round of 32
Gerald Freeman (AUS)	0
Jaggie van Staden (RHO)	5
Sayed El-Nahas (UAR)	KO-1
Mohamed Rizgalla (SUD)	L
Aleksandar Mitsev (BUL)	0
Quincey Daniels (USA)	5
Vazik Ghazarian (IRI)	2
Bobby Kelsey (GBR)	3
Bernie Meli (IRL)	5
Dimitrios Mikhail (GRE)	0
Bohumil Němeček (TCH)	3
Rupert König (AUT)	2
Luis Aranda (ARG)	4
Rogelio Reyes (MEX)	1
Piero Brandi (ITA)	5
Katsuji Watanabe (JPN)	0

Round of 16
Jaggie van Staden (RHO)	L
Sayed El-Nahas (UAR)	KO-2
Quincey Daniels (USA)	4
Bobby Kelsey (GBR)	1
Bernie Meli (IRL)	0
Bohumil Němeček (TCH)	5
Luis Aranda (ARG)	1
Piero Brandi (ITA)	4

Quarterfinals
Sayed El-Nahas (UAR)	0
Quincey Daniels (USA)	5
Bohumil Němeček (TCH)	4
Piero Brandi (ITA)	1

Semifinals
Quincey Daniels (USA)	0
Bohumil Němeček (TCH)	5

=== Bottom half ===
Round of 64
Raoul Sarrazin (CAN)	KO-1
Francois Sowa (LUX)	L
Sawong Mongkolrit (THA)	L
Kim Deuk-bong (KOR)	KO-1

Round of 32
Willie Ludick (RSA)	5
Martti Lehtevä (FIN)	0
Vladimir Engibaryan (URS)	KO-1
Werner Busse (EUA)	L
Azouz Bechir (TUN)	L
György Pál (HUN)	KO-1
Marian Kasprzyk (POL)	KO-1
Carmelo García (ESP)	L
Khalid Al-Karkhi (IRQ)	4
Grace Sseruwagi (UGA)	1
Clement Quartey (GHA)	5
Mohamed Boubekeur (MAR)	0
Miguel Amarista (VEN)	3
Jorge Salomão (BRA)	2
Raoul Sarrazin (CAN)	DQ-3
Kim Deuk-bong (KOR)	W

Round of 16
Willie Ludick (RSA)	2
Vladimir Engibaryan (URS)	3
György Pál (HUN)	0
Marian Kasprzyk (POL)	5
Khalid Al-Karkhi (IRQ)	0
Clement Quartey (GHA)	5
Miguel Amarista (VEN)	L
Kim Deuk-bong (KOR)	KO-2

Quarter-finals
Vladimir Engibaryan (URS)	0
Marian Kasprzyk (POL)	5
Clement Quartey (GHA)	3
Kim Deuk-bong (KOR)	2

Semi-finals
Marian Kasprzyk (POL)	L
Clement Quartey (GHA)	WO

=== Finals ===
Semifinals
Quincey Daniels (USA)	0
Bohumil Němeček (TCH)	5
Marian Kasprzyk (POL)	L
Clement Quartey (GHA)	WO

Final
Bohumil Němeček (TCH)	5
Clement Quartey (GHA)	0
