= William Kamanyi =

Ugandan athlete

Personal information
- Full name: William Luwagga Kamanyi
- Nationality: Uganda
- Born: 1942 (age 83–84) Uganda

Sport
- Country: Uganda
- Sport: Athletics
- Event: Long jump
- Updated on 2 April 2016

William Luwagga Kamanyi (born 1942) is a former Ugandan long jumper, cricket player, and sports coach. He represented Uganda at the 1962 British Empire and Commonwealth Games and the 1964 Summer Olympics, and later coached the Ugandan national cricket team.

Kamanyi attended King's College Budo. In the men's long jump event at the 1962 British Empire Games in Perth, Western Australia, he placed tenth out of nineteen competitors, with a jump of 7.3 metres (23 ft 11 in). This set a national record for Uganda that stood for 14 years. In the same event at the 1964 Summer Olympics in Tokyo, Kamanyi was registered as a competitor, but is marked "absent" in the official report. After the conclusion of his athletics career, he chose to concentrate on cricket, representing the Ugandan national team as an all-rounder between 1971 and 1983.

Between 1998 and 2001, Kamanyi served as head coach of the Ugandan national cricket team. During that period, he also coached the Ugandan under-19s at the 2001 Africa Under-19 Championship, and was involved in established the national women's team. In July 2007, Kamanyi was appointed to the position of development officer for the Africa Cricket Association in East Africa, replacing Kenyan Tom Tikolo. One of his first tasks in the position was to oversee the relocation of the development office from Nairobi, Kenya, to Kigali, Rwanda. He also worked closely with the fledgling Rwandan national team, serving as its coach for the 2009 World Cricket League Africa Division Three tournament. In 2014, Kamanyi was awarded the International Cricket Council's Lifetime Service Award.

== See also ==
- Frank Kisekka
- John Sentongo
- Frank Nyangweso
- Polycarp Kibuuka Kakooza
