= Mike Pye =

Former boxer who competed for England

Personal information
- Nationality: British (English)
- Born: 1944 (age 81–82)

Sport
- Sport: Boxing
- Event: Flyweight
- Club: Harris Lebus BC, Tottenham
Medal record
Boxing
Representing England
British Empire & Commonwealth Games
Bronze medal – third place	1962 Perth	51 kg flyweight

Michael J. Pye (born 1944), is a male former boxer who competed for England.

== Biography ==
Pye represented the 1962 English team at the 1962 British Empire and Commonwealth Games in Perth, Australia. He competed in the flyweight category, where he won a bronze medal after losing to Isaac Aryee of Ghana in the semi-final round.

He was a member of the Harris Lebus Boxing Club and was 1962 Amateur Boxing Association British flyweight champion.
