= Uganda Body Building and Fitness Association =

Association for bodybuilders in Uganda.

Uganda Body building and Fitness Association
- Abbreviation: UBBFA
- Founded: 1972
- Headquarters: Kampala Uganda
- Secretary General: Joseph Nkoyoyo
- Chairman: Twaha Maalo Ddungu
- National Coach: Steven Ssali
- Affiliations: NCS affiliation 2023

Uganda Body building and Fitness Association abbreviated as UBBFA is affiliated to the National Council of Sports (NCS) but it failed to register under the National Act ,CAP 151 and the National Sports Regulation 2025 due to financial difficulties.

== History ==
The body building sport was introduced in 1965 in Uganda by Ross Hansa, Shakib and Muhammad.

Uganda Federation for Body builders (UFBB) was founded in 1972,In 1996,the Federation was rebranded to the Uganda Body building Association(UBBA) and in 2008,it was named the Uganda Body building and Fitness Association(UBBFA) .

In the late 1960s,a gymnasium was opened up at Kampala Silver Spring hotel by an Indian national called Gandesha ,this boosted the sport even more and later in the early 1970s a National weight training gymnasium was set up at Nakivubo Stadium.

In 1971,Samson a Greece body builder alongside the Nigerian duo Mike Power and Super Dragon visited Uganda to help improve the popularity of the sport, then in 1974 Mike Power returned with a group of wrestlers from different parts of the world.

1983 at the first All African Body building championship held in Nairobi, Ugandan body builders managed to win some medals in their respective weight categories; Charles Kasasa won silver while James Onyango, Manchester Bogere and Ibrahim Mukiibi all secued bronze.

In 1984 Charles Kasasa participated in the Mr. Universe championship that was held in Brussels.

At the All Africa body building championship held in Assiut Egypt 1999, Uganda emerged second behind the hosts, Alex Yawe, Robert Ssejombwe, Ismail Sekandi were among the Ugandan team.

In August 2016,Hafswa Nalumansi, Irene Kasuubo and Irene Nakimbugwe hit the Mr. Kampala championship stage at Mt. Zion Hotel to perform and again at the Mr. Uganda championship at Freedom city auditorium in Novermber 2016.

== Championships ==
The Uganda Body building and Fitness Association holds a number of championships throughout their calendar year with the oldest being Mr. Kampala which was established in 1984 and the first edition was won by Charles Kasasa.

The table below consists of the previous Mr. Kampala championship winners.

| Name | Year | Weight | participants |
|---|---|---|---|
| Charles Kasasa | 1984 | | |
| Isaac Nsumba | 1997 1999 2000 2001 2002 | | |
| Kaddu Kutesa | 1998 | light weight | |
| Ivan Byekwaso aka Cobra | 2009 | middle weight | 80 |
| Godfrey Lubega | 2019 | middle weight | |
| Ben Lukwago | 2013 | 68kgs | 80 |
| Daniel Mwesigwa | 2021 | light weight | 80 |
| Lameck Muwanga | 2022 | welter weight | |

In November 2005,Mr.Uganda competition was also introduced and the championship was held at Kati kati Restaurant in Kampala along Lugogo bypass, Zephania Nsubuga aka Kawulu the winner walked away with 1,000,000 Ugandan shillings grand prize, he also represented Uganda in the Africa Body building championship held in Egypt December 2005.

The table below consists of the preious MR. Uganda championship winners.
| Name | Year | Weight |
|---|---|---|
| Zephania Nsubuga aka Kawulu | 2005 | |
| John Bosco Ssebabi | 2006 | welter weight |
| Ivan Byekwaso aka Cobra | 2007 2008 | middle weight |
| John Ronald Kariitwa | 2021 | light weight |
| Godfrey Lubega | 2022 | middle weight |
| Rayan Kayongo | 2023 | light heavy weight |
| Godfrey Lubega | 2024 | middle light |
| Hussein Mbajja aka Finito | 2025 | light heavy |

In 2021,The Uganda Body building and Fitness Association introduced four more championships and these include;

- Champions of champions body building championship.
- Inter Club's championship.
- Inter-cities championships.
- Inter-regional championships.

== Leadership ==
The leadership structure of the Uganda Body building and Fitness Association.
| President | Hajji Twaha Maalo Ddungu |
|---|---|
| vice President | Ibrahim Kunnji |
| Secretary General | Joseph Nkoyoyo |
| National Coach | Steven Ssali |

== Also see ==
Ivan Byekwaso
