= Dimitrios Mikhail =

Greek boxer (born 1933)

Personal information
- Nationality: Greek
- Born: 1933 (age 91–92); Athens, Greece

Sport
- Sport: Boxing

Dimitrios Mikhail (born 1933) is a Greek boxer. He competed in the men's light welterweight event at the 1960 Summer Olympics. At the 1960 Summer Olympics, he lost to Bernie Meli of Ireland.
