= Wales at the 1962 British Empire and Commonwealth Games =

- CG code: WAL
- CGA: Wales at the Commonwealth Games
- Website: teamwales.cymru

in Perth, Western Australia
- Flag bearers: Opening: Closing:
- Medals Ranked 13th: Gold 0 Silver 2 Bronze 4 Total 6

British Empire and Commonwealth Games appearances
- 1930; 1934; 1938; 1950; 1954; 1958; 1962; 1966; 1970; 1974; 1978; 1982; 1986; 1990; 1994; 1998; 2002; 2006; 2010; 2014; 2018; 2022; 2026; 2030

Wales at the 1962 British Empire and Commonwealth Games (abbreviated WAL) was the seventh time that the nation had participated at the Games.

The Games were held in Perth, Western Australia, from 22 November to 1 December 1962. Wales came 13th overall with two silver and four bronze medals.

== Medals ==
=== Silver ===
- Ieuan Owen, Weightlifting
- Men's coxless four, Rowing

=== Bronze ===
- Peter Arthur, Weightlifting
- Horace Johnson, Weightlifting
- John Merriman, Athletics
- Men's 4 × 110 yards relay team, Athletics

== Team ==
=== Athletics ===
Men

Athlete	Events	Club	Medals
Lynn Davies	Long jump, triple jump, 100y	Roath Harriers, Cardiff & Cardiff TC	
David England	220y, relay	Small Heath Harriers	Bronze medal
Laurie Hall	Shot put, hammer throw	Thames Valley Harriers	
Tony Harris	880y, 1 mile	Mitcham AC	
Berwyn Jones	100y, relay	Birchfield Harriers	Bronze medal
Ron Jones	100y, relay	Ilford AC	Bronze medal
John Merriman	3 miles, 6 miles	Watford Harriers	Bronze medal
Nick Whitehead	100y, 220y, relay	Birchfield Harriers	Bronze medal

Women

Athlete	Events	Club	Medals
Jacqueline Barnett	880y	Roath Harriers, Cardiff	

Results

Men
Track & road events

Athlete	Event	Round 1		Round 2		Semifinal		Final	
Athlete	Event	Result	Rank	Result	Rank	Result	Rank	Result	Rank
Lynn Davies	100 yd	9.9	4 Q	10.2	4	Did not advance			
Berwyn Jones	100 yd	9.6	2 Q	9.8	2 Q	9.9	6	Did not advance	
Ron Jones	100 yd	9.8	2 Q	9.8	5	Did not advance			
Nick Whitehead	100 yd	9.9	3 Q	10.1	4	Did not advance			
David England	220 yd	22.1	3 Q	22.5	5	Did not advance			
Nick Whitehead	220 yd	22.3	2 Q	22.5	6	Did not advance			
Tony Harris	880 yd	1:51.3	2 Q	—N/a		1:51.2	2 Q	1:52.3	6
Tony Harris	1 mile	4:09.9	2 Q	—N/a				4:11.8	6
John Merriman	3 miles	—N/a						DNS	
John Merriman	6 miles	—N/a						28:40.8	3rd place, bronze medalist(s)
David England; Berwyn Jones; Ron Jones; Nick Whitehead	4×110 yd relay	41.4	2 Q	—N/a				40.8	3rd place, bronze medalist(s)
John Merriman	Marathon	—N/a						DNF	

Field events

Athlete	Event	Final	
Athlete	Event	Distance	Rank
Lynn Davies	Long jump	25 ft 4 in (7.72 m)	4 BR
Lynn Davies	Triple jump	NM	
Laurie Hall	Shot put	43 ft 2 3/4 in (13.18 m)	15
Laurie Hall	Hammer throw	178 ft 6 in (54.41 m)	=5

Women
Track events

Athlete	Event	Round 1		Semifinal		Final	
Athlete	Event	Result	Rank	Result	Rank	Result	Rank
Jackie Barnett	880 yd	—N/a				2:14.8	6

=== Boxing ===
Athlete	Events	Club	Medals
Len James	91kg heavyweight	Patchway ABC, Bristol	
Ronnie Lendrum	57kg featherweight	Giles Sports, Cardiff	
Dave Paley	81kg light-heavyweight	Semtex Club, Tredegar	
Geoff Rees	63.5kg light-welterweight	Waun-Lwyd ABC, Ebbw Vale	
Brian Renney	60kg lightweight	St Dyfryg's ABC, Cardiff	

=== Cycling ===
Athlete	Events	Club	Medals
Mel Davies	road race, scratch race, pursuit	Port Talbot Wheelers	
Tony Hutchings	road race, scratch race, pursuit	Cardiff AjAx CC	
Don Skene	scratch race, sprint, time trial	Cardiff Byways RC	

=== Fencing ===
Men

Athlete	Events	Club	Medals
John Evans	Foil, Sabre	Royal Air Force	
Roger Maunder	Foil, Sabre	Cardiff Fencing Club	
John McCombe	Foil, Sabre	Cardiff Fencing Club	
Robert Reynolds	Foil, Épée	Cardiff Fencing Club	

Women

Athlete	Events	Club	Medals
Vivienne Ellis	Foil	Salle Reynolds Fencing Club	
Jackie Reynolds	Foil	Cardiff Fencing Club	

=== Lawn bowls ===
Athlete	Events	Club	Medals
Albert Evans	singles, fours/rinks	Abergavenny BC	
Tom Griffiths	pairs, fours/rink	Abergavenny BC	
Lynn Probert	pairs, fours/rinks	Abergavenny BC	
Claude Stephens	fours/rinks	Abergavenny BC	

=== Rowing ===
Men

Athlete	Events	Club	Medals
David Edwards	coxless four, double sculls	Leander Club	Silver medal
John Edwards	coxless four, double sculls	Leander Club	Silver medal
Jeremy Luke	coxless four	Llandaff Rowing Club	Silver medal
Tim Luke	coxless four	Llandaff Rowing Club	Silver medal

=== Swimming ===
Men

Athlete	Events	Club	Medals
John Beavan	110y, 220y breaststroke	Sparkhill Swimming Club, Birmingham	
Brian Jenkins	110y, 220y butterfly, 440y medley	Swindon Dophin Swimming Club	
Roddy Jones	110y, 220y backstroke	Newport Swimming Club	

Women

Athlete	Events	Club	Medals
Jocelyn Hooper	110y freestyle, 110y breaststroke, 440y medley	Newport Swimming Club	
Glenda Phillips	110y breaststroke, 110y butterfly, 110y freestyle	Swansea Swimming Club	
Cynthia Shaddick	110y breaststroke	Swansea Swimming Club	

=== Weightlifting ===
Athlete	Events	Club	Medals
Peter Arthur	82.5kg mid-heavyweight	Swansea	Bronze medal
Horace Johnson	75kg middleweight	Rhyl Barbell WC	Bronze medal
Ieuan Owen	60kg featherweight	Llanrug WC	Silver medal
