= American Football Federation of Uganda =

Governing body of American football in Uganda

- Sport: American football, Flag football
- Jurisdiction: National
- Founded: 2019
- Headquarters: Ntinda, Kampala, Uganda
- President: Steven George Okeng
- CEO: Denis Ongodia (CEO of Uganda National American Football League)
- (Uganda)

The American Football Federation of Uganda (AFFU) is the official governing body of American football in Uganda. It oversees the development of both tackle football and non-contact flag football across the country. AFFU was registered by the National Council of Sports in 2019, becoming the recognized authority for the sport in Uganda.

== History ==
Efforts to establish American football in Uganda began in the 2010s, with formal recognition coming in 2019 when AFFU was registered with the National Council of Sports. Since then, the federation has worked to promote grassroots participation, coaching, officiating, and competition structures.

In June 2019, the federation hosted former Philadelphia Eagles coach Jim Washburn in Kampala for clinics and development activities.

== Governance ==
AFFU is led by president Steven George Okeng, elected at its founding. In 2025, the federation appointed Denis Ongodia as Chief Executive Officer of the newly created Uganda National American Football League.

== Activities ==
=== National League ===
In April 2025, AFFU launched the first Uganda National American Football League, featuring six clubs: Longhorns, Wildcats, Eagles, Commanders, Vikings and Seahawks.

=== Coaching and Certification ===
AFFU has organized coaching certification courses, including collaborations with the New York Giants and other partners, to develop technical expertise in both tackle and flag football.

=== Schools and Grassroots ===
The federation promotes flag football in secondary schools, introducing the game through clinics and preparing for national inter-school tournaments.

=== International Competition ===
Uganda has participated in regional contests such as the Africa Zone Series against Kenya. In 2025, Uganda is scheduled to make its debut at the Africa Flag Football Championship in Cairo, Egypt.

== Regional role ==
In 2024, AFFU president Steven Okeng was elected head of the East Africa Confederation of American Football (EACAF), overseeing the sport’s growth in the region.

== See also ==
- Sport in Uganda
- International Federation of American Football
- Flag football
