= Pool Association of Uganda =

National sport-governing body

- Sport: Pool
- Jurisdiction: National
- Founded: 2003
- Headquarters: Kanjokya, Kampala, Uganda
- Chairman: Bob Trubish
- (Uganda)

The Pool Association of Uganda (PAU) is the official governing body of pool in Uganda. In 2003, the PAU was registered by the National Council of Sports (NCS) becoming a recognized authority for the sport in Uganda and it is affiliated internationally with the World Pool-Billiard Association (WPA).

== History ==
Efforts to establish the Pool Association of Uganda (PAU) began in the late 1990s. In 1999, Adam Ssebi established Hotline Pool Club in Ntinda, the first organized pool club in Uganda. This inspired the creation of other clubs, including Happy Holiday Pool Club in Nateete and Pool Joint in Nakulabye. By 2000, enthusiasts like Caster Ssemwogere and Robert Kayanja came together to form the Uganda Pool Association (UPA) and organized a six-team league, despite not being officially registered.

After disputes over unawarded prizes, they submitted a constitution to the National Council of Sports in 2001, leading to PAU’s official registration in 2002, with Ssebi elected as the first chairman during the association's assembly at Rock Catalina.

== Governance ==
Adam Ssebi served as interim chairman of the Uganda Pool Association (UPA) until 2002 and later served as Pool Association of Uganda (PAU) chairman from 2004 to 2006. In 2006, Bob Menani took over as chairman, serving until 2009, followed by Godfrey Mabirizi, who chaired the association from 2009 to 2010.

From 2011 to 2016, Farouk Wamala Kisuze led the PAU as chairman. In 2017, Bob Trubish was elected chairman, succeeding Kisuze, and served until 2019. Following his departure, Adam Ssebi was appointed again as interim chairman. In 2020, Bob Trubish was re-elected as PAU chairman, a position he continues to hold.

== Activities ==
Pool Association of Uganda coordinates competitive pool events at national and regional levels and this includes: National championships for different categories (men, women, juniors), regional leagues and club competitions, providing a structured competitive calendar and Inter-club tournaments something that encourages talent discovery.

It conducts training camps and coaching clinics for players to improve on their technical skills as well as offering mentorship programs to help emerging players transition to competitive levels.

PAU organizes certification programs for referees and officials to ensure fair play and it conducts workshops on tournament management, rules, and officiating standards.

Pool Association of Uganda selects and prepares national teams for continental and global pool competitions and it coordinates with international pool bodies for tournaments, training, and exposure.
