= Kim Deuk-bong =

South Korean boxer (born 1934)

Kim Deuk-bong 김득봉
Personal information
- Full name: Kim Deuk-bong
- Nationality: South Korean
- Born: January 20, 1934 (age 92) Geoje, South Gyeongsang, South Korea
- Height: 1.75 m (5 ft 9 in)

Sport
- Sport: Boxing
- Weight class: Light welterweight
Medal record
Asian Games
Gold medal – first place	1962 Jakarta	Light welterweight
Bronze medal – third place	1958 Tokyo	Light welterweight

- Kim Deuk-bong
- Hangul: 김득봉
- Hanja: 金得鳳
- RR: Gim Deukbong
- MR: Kim Tŭkpong

Kim Deuk-bong (Korean: 김득봉; born 20 January 1934) is a South Korean former boxer who competed as a light welterweight in the 1960 Summer Olympics. Kim lost his fourth fight, the quarterfinal match, to eventual silver-medalist Clement Quartey of Ghana.

== Amateur career ==
Kim first drew attention at the 1958 Asian Games in Tokyo where he protested against a decision by refusing to leave the ring after losing a controversial decision. When Kim fought Shigemasa Kawakami of Japan in the semifinal bout, he dominated his opponent in every round. However, when the judges' scores came up, Kim was judged to have lost to Kawakami. Seconds after the decision was made, Kim's entourage rushed the ring and his supporters in the stands began rioting, fighting with staff and policemen. Afterwards, Kim didn't leave the ring, sitting on a stool in his corner for hours.

At the 1960 Summer Olympics in Rome, Kim lost to eventual silver medalist Clement Quartey of Ghana by split decision in the quarterfinal match.

Kim won the gold medal in light welterweight at the 1962 Asian Games in Jakarta. At the 1964 Olympic Trials, Kim failed to qualify for his second Olympics, disqualified at the weigh-in for being over the light welterweight limit (under 63.5 kg) before the final bout.

=== Results ===
1960 Summer Olympics
Event	Round	Result	Opponent	Score
Light welterweight	First	Win	(Thailand) Sawong Mongkolrit	KO 2
Light welterweight	Second	Win	(Canada) Raoul Sarrazin	DSQ
Light welterweight	Third	Win	(Venezuela) Miguel Amarista	TKO 2
Light welterweight	Quarterfinal	Loss	(Ghana) Clement Quartey	2-3

== Professional career ==
After the 1964 Olympic trials, Kim subsequently made his professional debut in August 1964. In October 1964 Kim faced his fellow-Olympian and future world light middleweight champion Kim Ki-soo, and earned a draw. After six bouts, Kim fought future world light welterweight champion Takeshi Fuji in a non-title bout on January 20, 1966, in Tokyo. He was knocked out by the Japanese-Hawaiian legend in the 2nd round. After several lackluster competitions, Kim hung up his gloves.
