= Celedonio Lima =

Argentine boxer (1940–2026)

Personal information
- Born: 12 July 1940 Buenos Aires, Argentina
- Died: 20 July 2026 (aged 86)

Sport
- Sport: Boxing

Celedonio Lima (12 July 1940 – 20 July 2026) was an Argentinian boxer. He competed in the men's light middleweight event at the 1960 Summer Olympics. At the 1960 Summer Olympics, he defeated Jeffrey Alleyne of Canada, before losing to Wilbert McClure of the United States.
