= Brian Brazier =

Former boxer who competed for England

Personal information
- Nationality: British (English)
- Born: 9 January 1942 (age 84) Croydon, England

Sport
- Sport: Boxing
- Event: Light-Welterweight
- Club: Army; South Norwood BC; Croydon BC
Medal record
Boxing
Representing England
British Empire & Commonwealth Games
Bronze medal – third place	1962 Perth	light-welterweight

Brian M. Brazier (born 9 January 1942), is a male former boxer who competed for England.

== Biography ==
Brazier was part of the 1961 British team, which was labelled "the greatest win ever for a Great Britain team" after defeating the United States team ten bouts to nil.

Brazier represented the 1962 English team at the 1962 British Empire and Commonwealth Games in Perth, Australia. He competed in the light-welterweight category, where he won a bronze medal after losing Clement Quartey of Ghana in the semi-final round.

He was a member of the Croydon Boxing Club. He made his professional debut on 27 August 1963 and fought in 14 fights until 1966.

He was a member of the Army Boxing Club and was twice Light Welterweight ABA champion in 1961 and 1962.
