= Nicolae Stoenescu =

Romanian boxer

Personal information
- Nationality: Romanian
- Born: 18 November 1938 (age 86); Dobrich, Bulgaria

Sport
- Sport: Boxing

Nicolae Stoenescu (born 18 November 1938) is a Romanian boxer. He competed in the men's light middleweight event at the 1960 Summer Olympics. At the 1960 Summer Olympics, he lost to Souleymane Diallo of France.
