= Northern Ireland at the 1962 British Empire and Commonwealth Games =

- CG code: NIR
- CGA: Northern Ireland Commonwealth Games Council
- Website: nicgc.org

in Perth, Western Australia
- Flag bearers: Opening: Closing:
- Medals Ranked =17thth: Gold 0 Silver 0 Bronze 1 Total 1

British Empire and Commonwealth Games appearances
- 1934; 1938; 1950; 1954; 1958; 1962; 1966; 1970; 1974; 1978; 1982; 1986; 1990; 1994; 1998; 2002; 2006; 2010; 2014; 2018; 2022; 2026; 2030

Other related appearances
- Ireland (1930)

Northern Ireland competed at the 1962 British Empire and Commonwealth Games in Perth, Western Australia, from 22 November to 1 December 1962.

Northern Ireland finished equal 17th in the medal table with a single bronze medal.

== Medalists ==
=== Bronze ===
- Ivan Christie (boxing)

== Team ==
=== Athletics ===
Athlete	Events	Club	Medals
Joan Atkinson	100 yd/220 yd	Queen's AC, Short AC	
Dave Davidson	Shot put	Royal Ulster Constabulary	
Thelma Hopkins	80m hurdles, high jump, long jump	Queen's AC	
Dick Miller	javelin throw	London AC	
Mary Peters	High jump, shot put	Ballymena AC	

Results

Men
Field events

Athlete	Event	Final	
Athlete	Event	Distance	Rank
Dave Davidson	Shot put	47 ft 11 in (14.61 m)	10
Dick Miller	Javelin throw	208 ft 5 1/2 in (63.54 m)	7

Women
Track events

Athlete	Event	Round 1		Semifinal		Final	
Athlete	Event	Result	Rank	Result	Rank	Result	Rank
Joan Atkinson	100 yd	11.6	5	did not advance			
Joan Atkinson	220 yd	25.6	4	did not advance			
Thelma Hopkins	80 m hurdles	DNS		—N/a		did not advance	

Field events

Athlete	Event	Final	
Athlete	Event	Distance	Rank
Thelma Hopkins	High jump	5 ft 5 in (1.65 m)	9
Mary Peters	High jump	DNS	
Thelma Hopkins	Long jump	18 ft 9 1/4 in (5.72 m)	6
Mary Peters	Shot put	43 ft 8 in (13.31 m)	4

=== Boxing ===
Athlete	Events	Club	Medals
Ivan Christie	81kg light-heavyweight	South Belfast BC	Bronze medal
Pat Fitzsimmons	54kg bantamweight	St. Matthew's BC, Belfast	
Bernie Meli	63.5kg light-welterweight	Immaculata BC, Belfast	
Charlie Rice	67kg welterweight	Holy Family BC, Belfast	
Barney Wilson	75kg middleweight	Immaculata BC, Belfast	

=== Cycling ===
Athlete	Events	Club	Medals
Jack Johnston	road race, scratch race	Cyprus CC	

=== Lawn bowls ===
Athlete	Events	Club	Medals
Percy Watson	singles	Cavehill BC	

=== Weightlifting ===
Athlete	Events	Club	Medals
Sammy Dalzell	56kg bantamweight	Belfast	
Buster McShane	67.5kg lightweight	Belfast Health Studios	
