= Barney Wilson (boxer) =

Northern Irish boxer

Personal information
- Nationality: British (Northern Irish)
- Born: c.1942
- Died: c.2015

Sport
- Sport: Boxing
- Event: Middleweight
- Club: Immaculata BC, Belfast

Barney Wilson (c.1942 – c.2015) was a boxer from Northern Ireland who competed at the Commonwealth Games.

== Biography ==
Wilson was a member of Immaculata Boxing Club of Belfast. He represented Ulster and Ireland and was the Ulster middleweight champion.

In March 1962, Wilson a bricklayer at the time, reached the final of the Irish middleweight championships, losing out to Willie Byrne in the final bout.

He was selected for the 1962 Northern Irish team for the 1962 British Empire and Commonwealth Games in Perth, Australia. He competed in the welterweight category where he lost to eventual silver medallist Thomas Arimi of Ghana in the quarter-final round.

Wilson turned professional and was the heavyweight champion of Northern Ireland in 1966.

After retiring from boxing he took up refereeing until 2000 but struggled with illness afterwards.
