= Bobby Kelsey =

British boxer

Personal information
- Nationality: British
- Born: 8 December 1938 (age 86); London, England

Sport
- Sport: Boxing

Bobby Kelsey (born 8 December 1938) is a British boxer. He competed in the men's light welterweight event at the 1960 Summer Olympics. At the 1960 Summer Olympics, he defeated Vazik Kazarian of Iran, before losing to Quincey Daniels of the United States.
