= John Fisher (boxer) =

Scottish boxer

Personal information
- Nationality: British (Scottish)
- Born: c. 1942 Scotland

Sport
- Sport: Boxing
- Events: Middleweight; Light-heavyweight
- Club: Fauldhouse Miners' Welfare A.B.C

John Fisher (born c.1942) was a boxer who competed for Scotland at the Commonwealth Games.

== Biography ==
Fisher was a coal miner by trade and boxed out of Fauldhouse Miners' Welfare Amateur Boxing Club. He was a British and Scottish international and participated in the 1961 European Championships.

Fisher was part of the 1961 British team, which was labelled "the greatest win ever for a Great Britain team" after defeating the United States team ten bouts to nil. In June 1961 he was recognised by Fauldhouse for the honour that he had brought the village but just two month later was fined for assaulting family members at 17 Greenwell Street, Fauldhouse.

Fisher was the Scottish middleweight champion and was selected for the 1962 Scottish team for the 1962 British Empire and Commonwealth Games in Perth, Australia. He competed in the middleweight category, where he was beaten by Peter Odhiambo of Uganda.

After the Games he contionued to fight for Scotland at international level at the heavier weight of light-heavyweight. He won the prestigious ABA championships title in 1964.
