= John McDermott (featherweight boxer) =

Scottish boxer

Personal information
- Nationality: British (Scottish)
- Born: c.1939 Scotland

Sport
- Sport: Boxing
- Event: featherweight
- Club: Scottish National, Glasgow
Medal record
Representing Scotland
Commonwealth Games
Gold medal – first place	1962 Perth	featherweight

John McDermott (c.1939) was a boxer who competed for Scotland and won a gold medal at the Commonwealth Games.

== Biography ==
While living in Cambuslang and serving his national service with the Royal Scots in Benghazi, Libya, McDermott and fellow boxer Tommy McGuinness formed a boxing club for the regiment.

In 1962 boxing for Scottish National, he defeated Ronnie Lendrum in the semi-finals of the prestigious ABA Championships but lost the final to Billy Wilson. However, he did win the Scottish featherweight title and defeated Evan Armstrong in the Empire Games eliminator.

He represented the 1962 Scottish team for the 1962 British Empire and Commonwealth Games in Perth, Australia. He competed in the featherweight category, where he won the gold medal, defeating Ali Juma of Kenya in the final.

McDermott turned professional and fought nine bouts in 1963. He then switched to becoming a boxing trainer, a position he held for decades, earning an MBE in the 2004 Birthday Honours, for services to the sport and working with youngsters at Blantyre Miners' Welfare Gym.
