= Leif Hansen (Danish boxer) =

Danish boxer (1934–2022)

Personal information
- Nationality: Danish
- Born: 5 June 1934 Hobro, Denmark
- Died: 12 May 2022 (aged 87)

Sport
- Sport: Boxing

Leif Otto Hansen (5 June 1934 – 12 May 2022) was a Danish boxer. He competed in the men's light middleweight event at the 1960 Summer Olympics. At the 1960 Summer Olympics, he lost to Henryk Dampc of Poland. Hansen died on 12 May 2022, at the age of 87.

== See also ==
- Kryger, Lars (22 May 2022). "Det sidste leverstød er slået: Ringkøbings olympiske bokser er død 87 år". Folkebladet Lemvig (in Danish).
- Sand, Kristian (29 May 2022). "Tilbageblik på boksningens guldalder: Walther Hansen tog pynten af Tom Bogs og Leif Hansen blev bortdømt mod kommende verdensmester". Dagbladet Ringkøbing Skjern (in Danish).
- Sig Leergaard, Dorte (22 February 2014). "Boksningens guldalder i Ringkøbing". Dagbladet Ringkøbing Skjern (in Danish).
