= Katsuji Watanabe =

Japanese boxer

Personal information
- Nationality: Japanese
- Born: 11 March 1940 Fukushima, Japan
- Died: 7 February 2021

Sport
- Sport: Boxing

Katsuji Watanabe (渡辺 勝治, Watanabe Katsuji; 11 March 1940 – 7 February 2021) was a Japanese boxer. He competed in the men's light welterweight event at the 1960 Summer Olympics. At the 1960 Summer Olympics in Rome, he lost to Piero Brandi of Italy in the Round of 32. He died on 7 February 2021.
