= Frank Kisekka =

Ugandan boxer (born 1926)

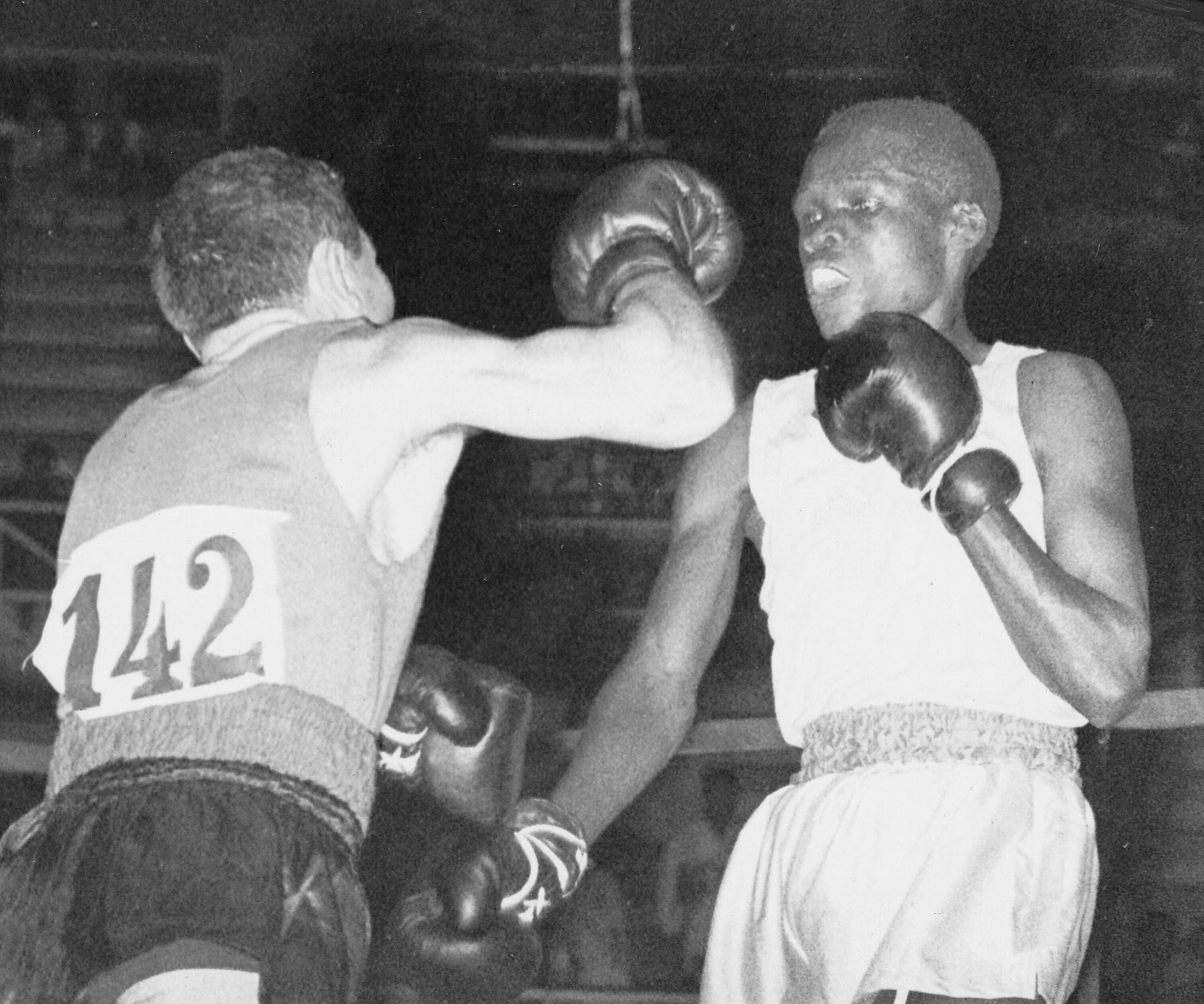
- Curcetti vs. Kisekka (right) at the 1960 Olympics

Personal information
- Born: 22 December 1926 Namutamba, Uganda
- Height: 163 cm (5 ft 4 in)
- Weight: 50 kg (110 lb)

Sport
- Sport: Boxing

Francis Kisekka (born 22 December 1926) is an Ugandan retired amateur flyweight boxer. He competed in the 1960 Summer Olympics, where he lost in the first bout to Paolo Curcetti.

== See also ==
- John Sentongo
- Frank Nyangweso
- Polycarp Kibuuka Kakooza
