= Laurie Hall =

Welsh athlete

Personal information
- Nationality: British (Welsh)
- Born: c.1938 Pontypridd, Wales

Sport
- Sport: Athletics
- Event: Hammer throw
- Club: Thames Valley Harriers

Lawrence Marshall Hall (born c.1938) is a former track and field athlete from Wales, who competed at the 1958 British Empire and Commonwealth Games and the 1962 British Empire and Commonwealth Games (now Commonwealth Games).

== Biography ==
Hall was a member of the Thames Valley Harriers and won the hammer throw event at the 1958 AAA Welsh championships, in addition to the inter-counties title.

He represented the 1958 Welsh team at the 1958 British Empire and Commonwealth Games in Cardiff, Wales, where he participated in one event; the hammer throw.

He went to a second Commonwealth Games, representing the 1962 Welsh team at the 1962 British Empire and Commonwealth Games in Perth, Australia, where he participated in two events; the hammer throw and the Shot put.

Hall went on to win eight consecutive Welsh titles from 1960 to 1967 and set a Welsh record in 1961, throwing 181 feet 4.5 inches.
