= Dave Davidson (shot putter) =

Northern Irish athlete

David Davidson
Personal information
- Nationality: British (Northern Irish)

Sport
- Sport: Athletics
- Event: Shot put
- Club: Royal Ulster Constabulary AC

David J. Davidson is a former athlete from Northern Ireland, who represented Northern Ireland at the British Empire and Commonwealth Games (now Commonwealth Games).

== Biography ==
Davidson was a constable with the Royal Ulster Constabulary by profession and specialised in the shot put and became the first Irishman to throw over 50 feet in June 1962.

He won the 1962 British Police Championships title

He represented Northern Irish team at the 1962 British Empire and Commonwealth Games in Perth, Australia, participating in the athletics events. He finished tenth in the shot put.

He was given the honour of being the flag standard bearer for Northern Ireland at the Games.

Davidson finished runner-up in the 1964 British Police Championships.

His son Jeremy Davidson played rugny union for Ireland and the British & Irish Lions.
