= Noël Le Graët =

French football official (born 1941)

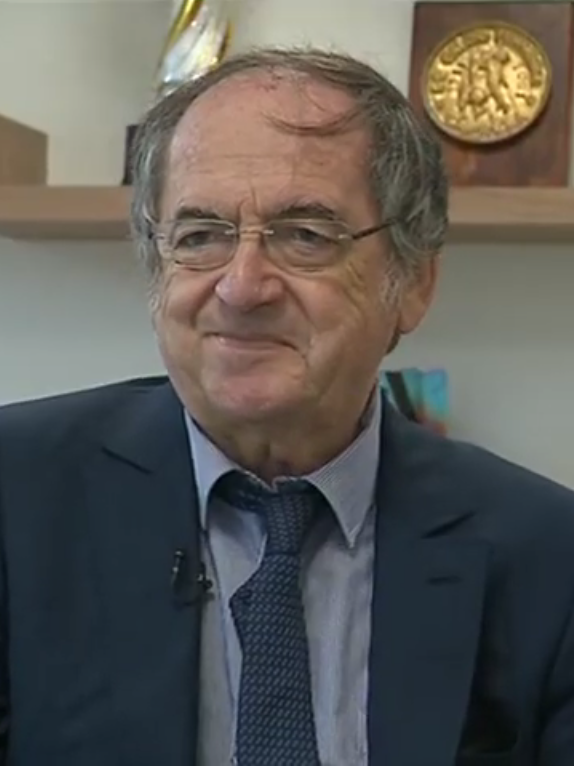
- Le Graët in 2019

President of the French Football Federation
- In office 18 June 2011 – 11 January 2023
- Preceded by: Fernand Duchaussoy
- Succeeded by: Philippe Diallo

Personal details
- Born: Noël Yves Marie Le Graët; 25 December 1941 (age 84) Bourbriac, France
- Occupation: Businessman; politician; football official

Noël Yves Marie Le Graët (French pronunciation: [nɔɛl iv maʁi lə ɡʁɛt]; born 25 December 1941) is a French businessman, politician and football official. He was the President of the French Football Federation (FFF) from 2011 to 2023. He was the vice-president of the FFF from 2005 to 2011.

== French Football Federation ==
Le Graët is very influential within the French Football Federation (FFF). From 1991 to 2000, he was the president of Ligue 1, the French professional league, and was the vice-president of FFF. In this position, he has brought—through acquisition of new sponsors, including of a new supplier contract with Nike—a substantial improvement of the financial situation of the FFF. Following the resignation of its president, Jean-Pierre Escalettes because of the fiasco of the France national football team at the 2010 FIFA World Cup, Noël Le Graët became as a likely candidate for interim Fernand Duchaussoy to succeed him.

On 18 June 2011, during elections of the association's federal assembly in Paris, he surprisingly collected 54.39 per cent of the votes to succeed Fernand Duchaussoy.

On 8 January 2023, when asked in a radio interview on RMC Sport whether he would have considered Zinedine Zidane as a potential successor to Didier Deschamps as the manager of the France national team, he made comments that players (including national team superstar Kylian Mbappé), politicians and football fans perceived as disrespectful. Le Graët apologised a few days later. On 11 January, he was forced to step back amid an investigation, commissioned by the French Ministry of Sports, into alleged sexual harassment of a female football agent. On 28 February, he resigned from his position at FFF, 13 days after the publication of a report by the French General Inspectorate which concluded that his "behavioural excesses are incompatible with the exercise of his functions".

== Other activities ==
Born in a neighbouring city, the Breton has built-up in the city of Guingamp a diversified company in the food industry during the last years, the Le Graët Group. It operates in various locations in the Brittany region. With Pêcherie d'Armorique in Erquy it has its own fishing fleet. Among the best known brand names in France belongs Celtigel (frozen meat, fish and vegetable dishes), Les Delices de la Mer (soups, sauces, bread spreads) and Agil Chien/Agil Chat (pet food). The group's turnover in 2010 amounted to approximately €163 million.

From 1971 to 1992 and again between 2002 and 2011, he was president of the French football club En Avant de Guingamp. For two terms, he was also mayor of Guingamp from 1995 to 2008, under the banner of the Socialist Party.

== Honours ==
- Officer of the Legion of Honour: 2018
