= Werner Busse =

German boxer

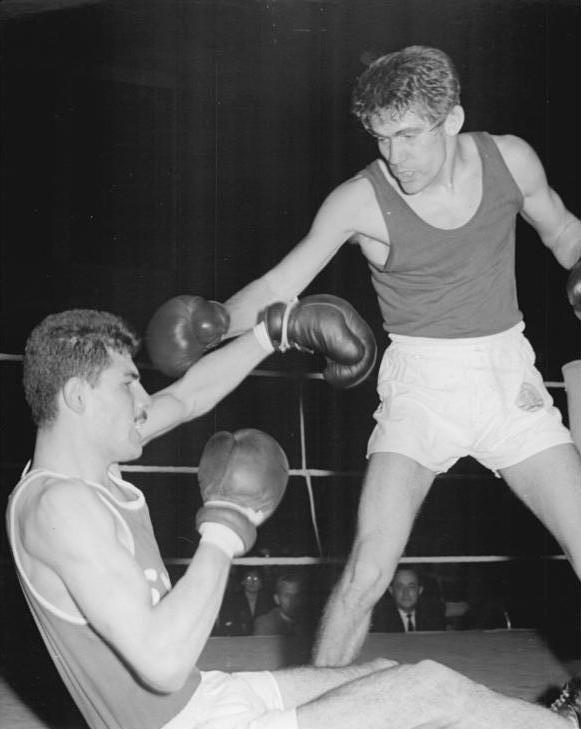
- Werner Busse (right) in 1963

Personal information
- Full name: Werner Busse
- Nationality: German
- Born: 17 November 1939 (age 86) Berlin, Germany

Sport
- Sport: Boxing

Werner Busse (born 17 November 1939) is a German boxer. He competed in the men's light welterweight event at the 1960 Summer Olympics. At the 1960 Summer Olympics, he lost to Vladimir Yengibaryan of the Soviet Union.
