= Charlie Rice (boxer) =

Northern Irish boxer

Personal information
- Nationality: British (Northern Irish)
- Born: c.1943

Sport
- Sport: Boxing
- Event: Welterweight
- Club: Holy Family BC, Belfast

Charlie Rice (born c.1943) is a former boxer from Northern Ireland who competed at the Commonwealth Games.

== Biography ==
Rice was a member of the Holy Family Boxing Club of Belfast and won the Irish junior welterweight title in January 1961. He represented Ulster and Ireland.

He was selected for the 1962 Northern Irish team for the 1962 British Empire and Commonwealth Games in Perth, Australia., where he competed in the welterweight category. He lost to eventual gold medallist Wallace Coe of New Zealand in the semi-final round. Rice was denied a bronze medal because of his disqualification in the semi-final for an unintentional low blow and despite organisers wanted to award the medal, the rules of the International Amateur Boxing Federation stated otherwise.

In March 1963 he reached the final of the Irish welterweight championships, losing out to Des Leahy in the final bout.

After retiring from boxing he took a career in the civil service and left Belfast for Liverpool in 1971. After three decades he moved back to Belfast following the death of his wife Anne.
