= Brian Whelan (boxer) =

English boxer

Personal information
- Nationality: British (English)
- Born: 1938 (age 87–88) Acton, London, England

Sport
- Sport: Boxing
- Event: Lightweight
- Club: Acton BC; Chiswick ABC
Medal record
Boxing
Representing England
British Empire & Commonwealth Games
Bronze medal – third place	1962 Perth	60 kg lightweight

Brian L. Whelan (born 1938), is a male former boxer who competed for England. He is not to be confused with the professional fighter Brian Whelan from Luton.

== Biography ==
Whelan, a milkman by trade, represented the 1962 English team at the 1962 British Empire and Commonwealth Games in Perth, Australia. He competed in the lightweight category, where he won a bronze medal after losing to Kesi Odongo of Uganda in the semi-final round.

He was a member of the Chiswick General Amateur Boxing Club and was 1962 ABA champion after famously beating the great amateur Dick McTaggart. He was only one of two fighters who won for England in the 8–2 defeat by Russia in the 1962 international meeting.

His older brother George Whelan fought at the 1954 British Empire and Commonwealth Games in Vancouver, Canada.
