= Michael Reid (boxer) =

Irish boxer (born 1938)

Personal information
- Nationality: Irish
- Born: 3 July 1938 (age 87) Dublin, Ireland

Sport
- Sport: Boxing

Michael Reid (born 3 July 1938) is an Irish boxer. He competed in the men's light middleweight event at the 1960 Summer Olympics.
