= Zeke Wilson (boxer) =

Zeke Wilson is an American boxer. He fought a precedent-setting United States court battle that defined the view of same-race discrimination, wherein the perpetrator and the object of the discrimination are of the same racial group.

The first case in the US to reach a federal court jury to challenge the concept of same-race discrimination did not occur until September 11, 2000, when a case was brought by black licensed boxing promoter Zeke Wilson against a state sports commission headed by a black chairman, asking for damage reparations and punitive redress after his right to conduct professional boxing events was violated.

White boxing commissioner William Pender performed direct discriminatory acts, while the black commission chairman Wilbert McClure failed to provide the promoter sufficient protection under his authority and cooperated in the unjust cancellation of a series of boxing events, causing financial harm to the promoter.

A unanimous jury verdict found that McClure was guilty of racial discrimination along with Pender, and both defendants were assessed punitive damages in addition to the compensatory damages awarded by the jury.

Wilson went on to write a book entitled The Eighth Round about his experiences.
