= György Pál (boxer) =

Hungarian boxer

Personal information
- Nationality: Hungarian
- Born: 29 March 1939 (age 87) Budapest, Hungary

Sport
- Sport: Boxing

György Pál (born 29 March 1939) is a Hungarian boxer. He competed in the men's light welterweight event at the 1960 Summer Olympics.
