= Brian Renney =

Welsh boxer

Brian Renney (or Renny)
Personal information
- Nationality: British (Welsh)
- Born: Q1. 1941 Cardiff, Wales
- Died: 17 July 2017 Cardiff, Wales

Sport
- Sport: Boxing
- Event: Lightweight
- Club: St Dyfrig's A.B.C, Cardiff

Brian Vivian Renney (1941 – 17 July 2017) was a boxer who competed for Wales at the Commonwealth Games.

== Biography ==
Renny or Renney boxed out of St Dyfrig's Amateur Boxing Club in Cardiff and was a Welsh international.

He was selected for the 1962 Welsh team for the 1962 British Empire and Commonwealth Games in Perth, Australia. He competed in the lightweight category, where he was beaten by eventual gold medallist Eddie Blay of Ghana in the quarter-final round.

After the Games he was boxing for Cardiff BC and turned professional from 1963 to 1965, fighting in 15 bouts.
