= Cesáreo Barrera =

Spanish boxer

Personal information
- Nationality: Spanish
- Born: 5 November 1942 (age 82); Las Palmas, Spain

Sport
- Sport: Boxing

Cesáreo Barrera (born 5 November 1942) is a Spanish boxer. He competed in the men's light middleweight event at the 1960 Summer Olympics.
