= Jorge Salomão =

Brazilian boxer

Personal information
- Born: 5 July 1937; São Paulo, Brazil
- Died: 25 May 2015 (aged 77); São Paulo, Brazil

Sport
- Sport: Boxing

Jorge Salomão (5 July 1937 – 25 May 2015) was a Brazilian boxer. He competed in the men's light welterweight event at the 1960 Summer Olympics.
