= John Bukowski =

Australian boxer

Personal information
- Full name: John Michael Bukowski
- Nationality: Australian
- Born: 18 January 1939 Mackay, Queensland, Australia
- Died: 20 February 2001 (aged 62)

Sport
- Country: Australia
- Sport: Boxing

John Michael Bukowski (18 January 1939 – 20 February 2001) was an Australian boxer. He competed at the 1960 Summer Olympics and the 1964 Summer Olympics. At the 1960 Summer Olympics, he defeated Abrie Schutte of South Africa, before losing to Boris Lagutin of the Soviet Union.

He was selected for the 1962 Australian team for the 1962 British Empire and Commonwealth Games in Perth, Australia, where he competed in the middleweight category. He lost to eventual silver medallist Thomas Arimi of Ghana in the semi-final round. Bukowski was denied a bronze medal because of his disqualification in the semi-final for leaning on his opponent and despite organisers wanted to award the medal, the rules of the International Amateur Boxing Federation stated otherwise.
