= Jeffrey Alleyne =

Canadian boxer (born 1938)

Personal information
- Nationality: Canadian
- Born: 25 June 1938 (age 86); Saint Philip, Barbados

Sport
- Sport: Boxing

Jeffrey Alleyne (born 25 June 1938) is a Canadian boxer. He competed in the men's light middleweight event at the 1960 Summer Olympics, losing his opening bout to Celedonio Lima of Argentina after receiving a first-round bye. Alleyne was born in St. Philip, Barbados and emigrated to Canada in 1955. He lived in Montreal.
