= Tom Menzies =

Scottish boxer

Personal information
- Nationality: British (Scottish)
- Born: 23 May 1939 Bellshill, Scotland
- Died: 13 December 2004 (aged 65) Falkirk, Scotland

Sport
- Sport: Boxing
- Event: Light-heavyweight
- Club: Monkland ABC and Army
Medal record
Representing Scotland
Commonwealth Games
| Bronze medal – third place | 1962 Perth | light-heavyweight |

Thomas Warden Menzies (2 July 1939 – 26 February 2004) was a boxer who competed for Scotland at the Commonwealth Games.

== Biography ==
Menzies was born in Bellshill but raised in Stirlingshire and started boxing at the Grangemouth Amateur Boxing Club in the late 1950s.

Menzies was part of the 1961 British team, which was labelled "the greatest win ever for a Great Britain team" after defeating the United States team ten bouts to nil. He won the 1961 Scottish light-heavyweight title and at the time worked as a chemist for Carron IC in Falkirk.

He boxed primarily for the Army and Monkland ABC, was a corporal with the Argyll and Sutherland Highlanders and won three Imperial Services boxing titles

Menzies was part of the 1961 British team, which was labelled "the greatest win ever for a Great Britain team" after defeating the United States team ten bouts to nil.

He was selected for the 1962 Scottish team for the 1962 British Empire and Commonwealth Games in Perth, Australia. He competed in the light-heavyweight category, where he was beaten by eventual silver medallist Jojo Miles of Ghana in the semi-final round.

He reached the final of the prestigious ABA championships title in 1963, losing to Brian Murphy.
