= Len James =

Welsh boxer

Personal information
- Nationality: British (Welsh)
- Born: 7 February 1933 Pontypridd, Wales
- Died: 6 February 2011 (aged 77) Pontypridd, Wales

Sport
- Sport: Boxing
- Event: Heavyweight
- Club: Patchway BC, Bristol

Leonard Gwyn James also known as Rocky James (7 February 1933 – 26 February 2011) was a boxer who competed for Wales at the Commonwealth Games.

== Biography ==
James was originally from Wood Road in Treforest and boxed for the Midlands and Western Counties.

In 1959, James reached the final of the prestigious A.B.A. heavyweight championship despite breaking a bone in his right hand. He lost to three time champion Dave Thomas of Polytechnic ABC in the final.

Living in Patchway, Bristol, he boxed out of the Patchway Bristol Boxing Club and was a Welsh international.

James acted as the Welsh team captain on several occasions. and was the 1962 Welsh ABA champion at heavyweight

He was selected for the 1962 Welsh team for the 1962 British Empire and Commonwealth Games in Perth, Australia. He competed in the heavyweight category, where he was beaten by eventual gold medallist George Oywello of Uganda.

== Family ==
His sister was the swimmer Jenny James.
