= Tim Luke (rower) =

British rower

Personal information
- Nationality: British (Welsh)
- Born: 10 January 1937 Cardiff, Wales

Sport
- Sport: Rowing
- Club: Llandaff Rowing Club
Medal record
Representing Wales
Commonwealth Games
| Silver medal – second place | Perth 1962 | coxless four |

Richard Timothy Luke (born 10 January 1937) is a former rower who won a silver medal for Wales at the Commonwealth Games.

== Biography ==
Luke was a member of the Llandaff Rowing Club and was selected for the 1960 Henley Royal Regatta coxed pairs trials.

He represented the 1962 Welsh team at the 1962 British Empire and Commonwealth Games in Perth, Australia, where he participated in the coxless four event. Teaming up with his twin brother Jeremy Luke and the Edwards brothers, John and David, the four won the silver medal behind the English four.

His brother Jeremy became the President of the Llandaff Rowing Club and following his death in 1994 had a boat named in his memory.
