= Bernie Meli =

Irish boxer

Personal information
- Nationality: Northern Irish
- Born: 22 July 1940 (age 85) Belfast, Northern Ireland
- Height: 167 cm (5 ft 6 in)
- Weight: 63 kg (139 lb)

Sport
- Sport: Boxing
- Event: Light-welterweight
- Club: Immaculata BC, Belfast

Bernard Meli (born 22 July 1940) is a former boxer from Northern Ireland, who competed for Ireland at the 1960 Summer Olympics.

== Biography ==
At the 1960 Olympic Games in Rome, he competed in the men's light welterweight event.

Meli was selected for the 1962 Northern Irish team for the 1962 British Empire and Commonwealth Games in Perth, Australia. He competed in the light-welterweight category, where he lost to Harvey Reti of Canada in the quarter-final round.
