= Johnny Pritchett =

English boxer (born 1943)

Personal information
- Nationality: British (English)
- Born: 15 February 1943 (age 83) Bingham, England
- Weight: light middle/middle/light heavyweight

Boxing career

Boxing record
- Total fights: 34
- Wins: 32 (KO 20)
- Losses: 1 (KO 0)
- Draws: 1
Medal record
Boxing
Representing England
British Empire & Commonwealth Games
Silver medal – second place	1962 Perth	51 kg flyweight

John G. Pritchett (born 15 February 1943) is an English amateur welterweight and professional light middle/middle/light heavyweight boxer of the 1960s and '70s, and boxing manager of the 1970s and '80s. He fought as Johnny Pritchett.

== Boxing career ==
As an amateur won the Amateur Boxing Association of England (ABAE) 1959 Junior Class-A title against B. Ford of St Peters ABC, boxing out of Bingham & District ABC, won the 1962 ABA welterweight title, against Harry Dean (Oxford YMCA), boxing out of Bingham & District ABC and won the 1963 ABA welterweight title, against Ralph Charles (West Ham ABC), boxing out of Bingham & District ABC.

He represented the 1962 English team at the 1962 British Empire and Commonwealth Games in Perth, Australia. He competed in the welterweight category, where he won a silver medal after losing to Wallace Coe of New Zealand in the final bout.

As a professional he won the British Boxing Board of Control (BBBofC) British middleweight title, and British Commonwealth middleweight title, and was a challenger for the European Boxing Union (EBU) middleweight title against Juan Carlos Durán, his professional fighting weight varied from 153 1/4 lb (69.5 kg; 10 st 13.3 lb), i.e. light middleweight to 162 1/2 lb (73.7 kg; 11 st 8.5 lb), i.e. light heavyweight.

== Boxing manager ==
Pritchett managed; Dave Needham, Howard Hayes, Johnny Cheshire, and Dave Symonds.
