= Ivan Byekwaso =

Ugandan bodybuilder and fitness coach

Personal information
- Full name: Ivan Byekwaso Kazibwe
- Nickname: Cobra
- National team: Uganda
- Born: Jinja
- Occupation: Body builder
- Years active: 2005 -2026
- Height: 178 in (450 cm)
- Weight: 80 kg (176 lb; 12 st 8 lb)
- Spouse: Victoria Bechtold Byekwaso
- Children: William Byekwaso Whitney Nakazibwe Maria Byekwaso Jacob and Jason Byekwaso

Sport
- Sport: Body Builder

Ivan Byekwaso Kazibwe also known as The Ugandan Muscleman; Cobra, is a Ugandan professional bodybuilder, certified fitness coach and retired association footballer. He won the Amateur division at the 2024 INBA/PNBA PRO/AM Natural Olympia in the Men's Pro Bodybuilding Masters(40–49) that was held on November 8, 2024, in Las Vegas. On 5 September 2015, Ivan Byekwaso was crowned Mr. Natural Universe at the INBA/PNBA World Natural Bodybuilding and Fitness Championships, he won the 175 cm men's category winning against Antonio Garcia, Dustin Glenn and Andrew Molinar and in November 2015, he won bronze at the INBA Natural Olympia Championship.

== Early life and education ==
Ivan Byekwaso was born in Jinja to Nabukalu Florence and Byekwaso William who was a driver to Idi Amin. Byekwaso relied on football scholarships for his education and also working on construction sites for pocket money.

== Career ==
=== Football career ===
Byekwaso played for Kakira Football Club in 2001, Iganga Football Club, before quitting football in 2005 he played for Kabalagala Rangers Football Club where he was paid 3,000 Ugandan shillings for each big game played. His dream was to become a licensed player under the Super Division.

=== Hospitality career ===
In 2005, Byekwaso joined an Indian restaurant called Summer restaurant where he worked as kitchen stuff, the owner saw potential in him and chose to sponsor him at Jimmy Ssekasi Catering Institute after his diploma, he got a job at another restaurant at Amber House paying 100,000 Ugandan shillings a month, he joined joined Al's bar as a bouncer to earn extra money.

=== Bodybuilding career ===
Mugisha Martine who was working at Ange Noir by the time, invited Ivan Byekwaso to join him for a gym a session which he tried for a while and as time went by, they relocated to a gym in Nakivubo at their first visit the trainer told him he had strong legs and needed to work on his upper body, then he would have a chance at winning Mr. Kampala Championship.

Ivan Byekwaso begun his body building career in 2005 at Nakivubo Power House.

In 2006 Ivan Byekwaso won the junior competition for Mr. Kampala.

In 2007, Ivan Byekwaso and teammates attended the 8th African Body building Championship in Algeria where the Ugandan team was unable to secure any medals while Egypt walked away with 8 gold and 2 sliver medals, the event was held at Batna in Algeria.

In 2007, Ivan Byekwaso went on to compete in the senior category for Mr. Kampala, he emerged the third.

In 2008, Ivan Byekwaso was crowned the winner in the Mr. Kampala Championship. He shook his entire back muscles to Awilo Longomba's Coupe Bibamba song at the Mr. Kampala Championship that was held at Sharing hall Nsambya.

In 2009,Ivan Byekwaso won three titles; Mr. Kampala in August, World Aids Day Championship in Kericho and Mr. Uganda.

In 2014, Yoweri Museveni gave Ivan Byekwaso 7,500,000 Ugandan shillings to help with the preparation and accommodation of the body builder in Slovakia at the World Natural Body building Championship held on June 27–28, 2014.

In June 2014,Ivan Byekwaso made his first professional appearance at the INBA World Championship that held in Nitra, Slovakia were he won a Sliver medal in his Category and this win enabled him to secure a spot in the 2014 Natural Olympia.

At the 2014 Olympiad, Ivan Byekwaso did not only compete as an athlete but as an ambassador after the Ministry of Foreign Affairs accredited him at the US Embassy in Kampala.

In June 2015, Ivan Byekwaso was seeking funds to help him compete in the September 2015 INBA Natural Universe Body building Championship and the November 2015 Natural Olympiad Championship. He hoped to benefit from the Presidential Sports Award in the 2015 financial year after his victory in Slovakia.

In 2015, Ivan Byekwaso was one of the sports personalities under the Pemba Sports Africa sports promotion company, Jack Pemba sponsored three trips to international competitions for Ivan Byekwaso to the USA.

In 2015,Ivan Byekwaso was voted the Nile Special USPA Sports Personality of the month of September and November after achieving at the INBA Mr. Natural Universe and Mr. Natural Olympia 2015.

In 2016, Ivan Byekwaso fell out with his sponsor Jack Pemba.

== Contest history ==
- 2007 Africa Body building Championship in Algeria.
- 2009 Worlds Aids Day Championship in Kenya.
- 2013 Miami Pro World bodybuilding Championships.
- 2013 Uganda Musclemania Championships.
- 2014 INBA World Championships in Nitra, Slovakia.
- 2014 INBA in the United States.
- 2015 INBA Natural Universe 2015 World Cup.
- 2017 IFBB European Championship.
- 2024 INBA/PNBA PRO/AM Natural Olympia.

== Personal life ==
Ivan Byekwaso two children namely; William Byekwaso and Whitney Nakazibwe.

In 2015, Ivan Byekwaso dated Tara Caballero, a German-French fitness trainer that he met at a gym in California.

Ivan Byekwaso married Viktoria, the two met at a fitness studio in Munich and they have a child together.

On November 9th 2026,Ivan Byekwaso and Viktoria welcomed twin boys (Jason and Jacob Byekwaso)at the Women's hospital Ulm Germany.

== Controversies ==
After a failed relationship, Ivan Byekwaso's ex Ugandan girlfriend based in Germany accused him of raping her in 2017, he was imprisoned as investigations were being carried out, he was later set free after confirming that it was a love affair gone wrong.

In 2018, Ivan Byekwaso was announced dead by Bon van Deer in Germany where he had relocated too after the 2016 INBA World Championships in Hungary, Bon Van Deer further later clarified that the deceased was not the Ugandan muscle man but rather someone with a similar name.

== See also ==
- Uganda Body building and Fitness Association
