= Sayed El-Nahas =

Egyptian boxer (1939–1994)

Personal information
- Nationality: Egyptian
- Born: 19 November 1939; Giza, Egypt
- Died: 29 November 1994 (aged 55)

Sport
- Sport: Boxing

Sayed El-Nahas (19 November 1939 – 29 November 1994) was an Egyptian boxer. He competed at the 1960 Summer Olympics, 1964 Summer Olympics and the 1968 Summer Olympics. At the 1960 Summer Olympics, he defeated Mohamed Rizgalla and Jaggie van Staden, before losing to Quincey Daniels.
