= Sawong Mongkolrit =

Thai boxer

Personal information
- Nationality: Thai
- Born: 8 February 1935 (age 90); Bangkok, Thailand

Sport
- Sport: Boxing

Sawong Mongkolrit (born 8 February 1935) is a Thai boxer. He competed in the men's light welterweight event at the 1960 Summer Olympics. At the 1960 Summer Olympics, he lost to Kim Deuk-bong of South Korea.
