= Pedro Votta =

Uruguayan boxer

Personal information
- Born: 7 July 1937; Montevideo, Uruguay
- Died: 18 August 2003 (aged 66)

Sport
- Sport: Boxing

Pedro Votta (7 July 1937 – 18 August 2003) was a Uruguayan boxer. He competed in the men's light middleweight event at the 1960 Summer Olympics.
