= Jenny James (swimmer) =

First Welsh person to swim the English Channel (1927–2014)

Personal information
- Born: 1927 Pontypridd, Wales
- Died: October 24, 2014 (aged 86–87) Porth, Rhondda, Wales

Sport
- Sport: Swimming

Jenny Eileen James (1927 – 24 October 2014) was the first Welsh person to swim the English Channel.

Born in Pontypridd in 1927, she learned to swim aged 7 in the Pontypridd Swimming Baths. (The Baths reopened in 2015 as the Pontypridd Outdoor Lido, now the National Lido of Wales). On 19 September 1949 she swam from Penarth to Weston-super-Mare, and then made the swim in the reverse direction on 9 July 1950, so becoming the first woman to swim the Bristol Channel both ways. On 16 August 1951 she competed in the Second Daily Mail Cross Channel Race, and became the first Welsh person to swim the English Channel, crossing from France to England in 13 hours 55 minutes. She received an official homecoming on her return to Pontypridd. She was granted the freedom of Pontypridd in recognition of her achievement, and free entrance for life to any swimming pool in Wales. She became the women's record holder for her swim of Windermere in 1958.

She worked as a swimming coach and lifeguard at the Pontypridd Baths, and is credited as having saved more than 100 lives in her career. She is commemorated at the Lido, where a plaque has been erected in her honour.

James died at a care home in Porth, Rhondda on 24 October 2014. She was unmarried.

== Family ==
Her brother was the boxer Rocky James.
