= Carmelo García =

Spanish boxer (born 1939)

Personal information
- Nationality: Spanish
- Born: 3 December 1939 Las Palmas, Spain
- Died: 31 August 2023 (aged 83)

Sport
- Sport: Boxing

Carmelo García (3 December 1939 – 31 August 2023) was a Spanish boxer. He competed in the men's light welterweight event at the 1960 Summer Olympics.
