= Bas van Duivenbode =

Dutch boxer

Personal information
- Nationality: Dutch
- Born: 11 March 1940 Amsterdam, Netherlands
- Died: 24 September 2015 (aged 75) Amsterdam, Netherlands

Sport
- Sport: Boxing

Bas van Duivenbode (11 March 1940 – 24 September 2015) was a Dutch boxer. He competed in the men's light middleweight event at the 1960 Summer Olympics, where he was eliminated in the second round and finished tied for ninth place.
