= Raoul Sarrazin =

Canadian boxer (1938–2020)

Personal information
- Born: 26 July 1938 Saint-Barthélemy, Quebec, Canada
- Died: 22 July 2020 (aged 81) Repentigny, Quebec, Canada

Sport
- Sport: Boxing

Raoul Sarrazin (26 July 1938 – 22 July 2020) was a Canadian boxer. He competed in the men's light welterweight event at the 1960 Summer Olympics. He defeated Francois Sowa of Luxembourg to advance to the second round, where he lost to Kim Deuk-bong by disqualification.
