= Brian van Niekerk =

Rhodesian boxer (born 1933)

Personal information
- Nationality: Rhodesian
- Born: 10 January 1933 (age 92); Benoni, Gauteng, South Africa

Sport
- Sport: Boxing

Brian van Niekerk (born 10 January 1933) is a Rhodesian former boxer. He competed in the men's light middleweight event at the 1960 Summer Olympics, representing Rhodesia. At the 1960 Summer Olympics, he lost to Carmelo Bossi of Italy.
