= Abrie Schutte =

South African boxer

Personal information
- Nationality: South African
- Born: 11 February 1937 Springs, Gauteng, South Africa
- Died: 5 July 2003 (aged 66) Randfontein, South Africa

Sport
- Sport: Boxing

Abrie Schutte (11 February 1937 – 5 July 2003) was a South African boxer. He competed in the men's light middleweight event at the 1960 Summer Olympics. At the 1960 Summer Olympics, he lost to John Bukowski of Australia.
