= Jeremy Luke (rower) =

British rower

Personal information
- Nationality: British (Welsh)
- Born: 10 January 1937 Cardiff, Wales
- Died: September 1994 South Glamoran, Wales

Sport
- Sport: Rowing
- Club: Llandaff Rowing Club
Medal record
Representing Wales
Commonwealth Games
Silver medal – second place	Perth 1962	coxless four

Jeremy Charles Luke (10 January 1937 – September 1994) was a rower who won a silver medal for Wales at the Commonwealth Games.

== Biography ==
Luke was a member of the Llandaff Rowing Club and was selected for the 1960 Henley Royal Regatta coxed pairs trials.

He represented the 1962 Welsh team at the 1962 British Empire and Commonwealth Games in Perth, Australia, where he participated in the coxless four event. Teaming up with his twin brother Tim Luke and the Edwards brothers, John and David, the four won the silver medal behind the English four.

He became the President of the Llandaff Rowing Club and following his death in 1994 had a boat named in his memory.
