= Paddy Donovan =

New Zealand boxer

Thomas Donovan
Personal information
- Full name: Thomas Patrick Donovan
- Born: 23 December 1936 Napier, New Zealand
- Died: 11 March 2018 (aged 81) Napier, New Zealand
- Occupation: Accountant
- Height: 1.64 m (5 ft 4 1/2 in)
- Weight: 59 kg (130 lb)

Sport
- Country: New Zealand
- Sport: Amateur boxing

Achievements and titles
- National finals: Featherweight champion (1954); Lightweight champion (1956, 1957, 1959, 1962)
Medal record
Representing New Zealand
Men's boxing
British Empire and Commonwealth Games
Bronze medal – third place	1958 Cardiff	Lightweight
Bronze medal – third place	1962 Perth	Lightweight

Thomas Patrick Donovan (23 December 1936 – 11 March 2018) was a New Zealand amateur boxer and rugby union player. He represented his country in boxing at the 1956 and 1964 Olympic Games, and won bronze medals at the 1958 and 1962 British Empire and Commonwealth Games. He also played representative rugby for Hawke's Bay.

== Early life and family ==
Born in Napier on 23 December 1936, Donovan was the son of Tommy Donovan, who won the 1927 New Zealand amateur featherweight boxing title, and then had 46 professional bouts between 1929 and 1935. Paddy Donovan grew up on his family's farm at Meeanee, and was educated at St John's College, Hastings, where he was head boy.

== Boxing ==
Donovan won his first national amateur boxing title, in the featherweight division, in 1954, while he was still at school. He went on to win the national lightweight title four times—in 1956, 1957, 1959, and 1962—and he was awarded the Jameson Belt for the most scientific boxer in 1956, 1959, and 1962.

Donovan won the bronze medal in the men's 57–60 kg (lightweight) division at the 1958 British Empire and Commonwealth Games. Four years later at the 1962 British Empire and Commonwealth Games he again won the bronze medal in the same division. He competed at two Olympics, not making it past the first round of the lightweight division in 1956 and 1964, and was controversially omitted from the New Zealand team for the 1960 Olympics.

== 1956 and 1964 Olympic results ==
Below is the record of Paddy Donovan, a lightweight boxer from New Zealand, who competed at the 1956 Melbourne Olympics:

- Round of 32: lost to Toshihito Ishimaru (Japan) on points

Below is the record of Paddy Donovan, a lightweight boxer from New Zealand, who competed at the 1964 Tokyo Olympics:

- Round of 32: lost to Hector Pace (Argentina) referee stopped contest

== Rugby union ==
A halfback and first five-eighth, Donovan played for the Hawke's Bay rugby union team between 1955 and 1959.

== Later life and death ==
From 1962, Donovan worked as an accountant in Hastings, retiring in 2012 after 50 years. In 2001, he established Ballydooley Cider Ltd on the family orchard. Donovan died in Napier on 11 March 2018.
