= Ivan Christie =

Northern Irish boxer

Personal information
- Nationality: British (Northern Irish)
- Born: c.1944

Sport
- Sport: Boxing
- Event: Light-heavyweight
- Club: South Belfast BC
Medal record
Representing Northern Ireland
Commonwealth Games
Bronze medal – third place	1962 Perth	light-heavyweight

Hans Ivan Christie (born c.1944) is a former boxer from Northern Ireland who won a bronze medal at the Commonwealth Games.

== Biography ==
Christie, a Hollerith operator, from Newtownbreda, was a member of the South Belfast Boxing Club and was the 1960 Ulster junior champion.

In March 1962 he won the Irish light-heavyweight title.

He was selected for the 1962 Northern Irish team for the 1962 British Empire and Commonwealth Games in Perth, Australia, where he competed in the light-heavyweight category. winning a bronze medal after losing to Tony Madigan of Australia in the semi-final round.
