= Peter Benneyworth =

Boxer who competed for England

Personal information
- Nationality: British (English)
- Born: 5 February 1938 Hammersmith, London, England
- Died: 27 March 1974 (aged 36) Surrey, England

Sport
- Sport: Boxing
- Event: Bantamweight
- Club: Caius BC, Battersea
Medal record
Representing England
Men's boxing
British Empire and Commonwealth Games
Bronze medal – third place	1962 Perth	Bantamweight

Peter Stephen Benneyworth (5 February 1938 – 27 March 1974), was a male boxer who competed for England.

== Biography ==
Benneyworth represented the England team during the boxing tournament at the 1958 British Empire and Commonwealth Games in the -54 Kg division.

He fought out of the Caius Boxing Club and was twice the ABA Bantamweight champion of Britain in 1961 and 1962.

He was part of the 1961 British team, which was labelled "the greatest win ever for a Great Britain team" after defeating the United States team ten bouts to nil.

Benneyworth represented the 1962 English team at the 1962 British Empire and Commonwealth Games in Perth, Australia. He competed in the bantamweight category, where he won a bronze medal after losing to Sammy Abbey of Ghana in the semi-final round.
