= Geoff Rees =

Welsh boxer

Personal information
- Nationality: British (Welsh)
- Born: Q4. 1941 Waun-Lwyd, Wales
- Died: November 2024

Sport
- Sport: Boxing
- Event: Light-welterweight
- Club: Waun-Lwyd ABC, Ebbw Vale

Geoffrey W. Rees (1941 – November 2024) was a boxer who competed for Wales at the Commonwealth Games.

== Biography ==
Rees was from Waun-Lwyd in the Ebbw Valley and boxed out of the Waunl-Lwyd Boxing Club.

He was twice Welsh ABA champion at light-welterweight in 1961 ad 1962 and represented Wales at international level.

He was selected for the 1962 Welsh team for the 1962 British Empire and Commonwealth Games in Perth, Australia. He competed in the light-welterweight category, where he was beaten by eventual silver medallist Dick McTaggart of Scotland in the quarter-final round.

Rees later turned professional from 1963 to 1965 and fought 15 bouts.
