= Dennis Pollard =

Former boxer who competed for England

Personal information
- Nationality: British (English)
- Born: 5 November 1934 (age 91) Hendon, England

Sport
- Sport: Boxing
- Event: Light-heavyweight
- Club: Fitzroy Lodge ABC; Metropolitan Police

Dennis E. Pollard (born 1934), is a male former boxer who competed for England.

== Biography ==
A policeman by trade, he represented the Metropolitan Police and Fitzroy Lodge Amateur Boxing Club.

Pollard was part of the 1961 British team, which was labelled "the greatest win ever for a Great Britain team" after defeating the United States team ten bouts to nil.

He represented the 1962 English team at the 1962 British Empire and Commonwealth Games in Perth, Australia. He competed in the light-heavyweight category, where he lost to Jojo Miles of Ghana in the quarter-final round.
