= Athletics at the 1962 British Empire and Commonwealth Games – Men's shot put =

Men's shot put at the 1962 British Empire and Commonwealth Games
- Venue: Perry Lakes Stadium
- Date: 29 November 1962
- Competitors: 16 from 9 nations
- Winning distance: 59 ft 4 in (18.08 m) GR

Medalists
gold medal	Martyn Lucking	England
silver medal	Mike Lindsay	Scotland
bronze medal	Dave Steen	Canada

The men's shot put at the 1962 British Empire and Commonwealth Games as part of the athletics programme was held at the Perry Lakes Stadium on Thursday 29 November 1962.

The event was won by Englishman Martyn Lucking with a throw of 59 ft 4 in (18.08 m). Lucking won by 1 1/2 in (4 cm), ahead of his training partner Scotsman Mike Lindsay and Dave Steen from Canada who won the bronze medal. Lucking's throw set a new Games record, eclipsing the mark that fellow Englishman Arthur Rowe had set in Cardiff four years earlier. The previous distance of 57 ft 8 in (17.58 m) was also bettered by Lindsay and Steen.

== Records ==
World record	Dallas Long (USA)	65 ft 10 1/2 in (20.08 m)	Los Angeles, United States	18 May 1962
Commonwealth record				
Games record	Arthur Rowe (ENG)	57 ft 8 in (17.58 m)	Cardiff, Wales	24 July 1958

The following records were established during the competition:

Date	Event	Name	Nationality	Time	Record
29 November	Final	Martyn Lucking	England	59 ft 4 in (18.08 m)	GR

== Final ==
Rank	Name	Nationality	Result	Notes
1st place, gold medalist(s)	Martyn Lucking	England	59 ft 4 in (18.08 m)	GR
2nd place, silver medalist(s)	Mike Lindsay	Scotland	59 ft 2 1/2 in (18.05 m)	PB
3rd place, bronze medalist(s)	David Steen	Canada	58 ft 8 3/4 in (17.90 m)	
4	Warwick Selvey	Australia	54 ft 6 1/2 in (16.62 m)	
5	Merv Kemp	Australia	52 ft 6 3/4 in (16.02 m)	
6	Les Mills	New Zealand	51 ft 10 1/2 in (15.81 m)	
7	Warren Ryan	Australia	51 ft 8 in (15.75 m)	
8	Yovan Ochola	Uganda	50 ft 5 in (15.37 m)	
9	John Cochrane	Australia	49 ft 3 1/4 in (15.02 m)	
10	Dave Davidson	Northern Ireland	47 ft 11 in (14.61 m)	
11	John Sheldrick	England	47 ft 1 1/4 in (14.36 m)	
12	Robin Tait	New Zealand	46 ft 8 in (14.22 m)	
13	Imbert Roberts	Saint Lucia	43 ft 9 in (13.34 m)	
14	Roy Hollingsworth	England	43 ft 7 3/4 in (13.30 m)	
15	Laurie Hall	Wales	43 ft 2 3/4 in (13.18 m)	
16	John McSorley	England	39 ft 0 in (11.89 m)	
