= François Sowa =

Luxembourgish boxer

Personal information
- Nationality: Luxembourgish
- Born: 7 March 1937 (age 88); Schifflange, Luxembourg

Sport
- Sport: Boxing

François Sowa (born 7 March 1937) is a Luxembourgish boxer. He competed in the men's light welterweight event at the 1960 Summer Olympics. At the 1960 Summer Olympics in Rome, he lost to Raoul Sarrazin of Canada by a first-round knockout in the Round of 32.
