= Bohumil Němeček =

Czech boxer

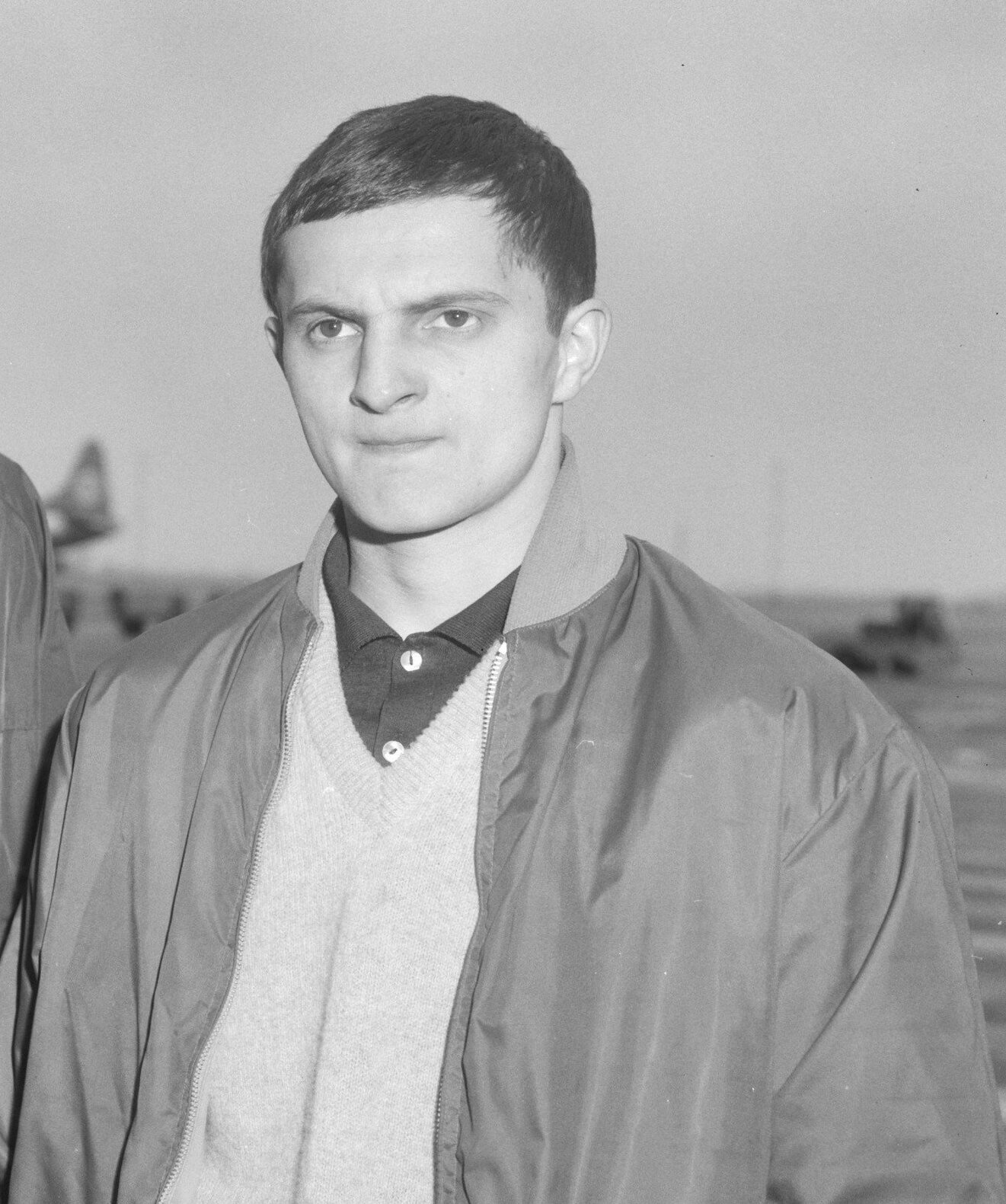
- Bohumil Němeček in 1966

Personal information
- Born: 2 January 1938 Tábor, Czechoslovakia
- Died: 2 May 2010 (aged 72) Ústí nad Labem, Czech Republic
- Height: 1.75 m (5 ft 9 in)
- Weight: 63 kg (139 lb)

Sport
- Sport: Boxing
Medal record
Representing Czechoslovakia
Olympic Games
Gold medal – first place	1960 Rome	Welterweight
European Amateur Championships
Bronze medal – third place	1963 Moscow	Welterweight
Gold medal – first place	1967 Rome	Welterweight

Bohumil Němeček (2 January 1938 – 2 May 2010) was a Czech welterweight boxer. He first trained in ice hockey, and changed to boxing only in 1955, winning Czechoslovak national titles in 1959 and 1960, an Olympic gold medal in 1960, and a European title in 1967. He also competed at the 1964 and 1968 Olympics, but in both cases was eliminated in the second round. After retiring as a participant, Němeček worked as a boxing coach and a bus driver. His health rapidly deteriorated after suffering a stroke in 2000, eventually resulting in his death ten years later.

== 1968 Olympic results ==
- Round of 64: bye
- Round of 32: lost to Ivan Kiryakov (Bulgaria) by disqualification in the third round
