= Wilbert McClure =

American boxer (1938–2020)

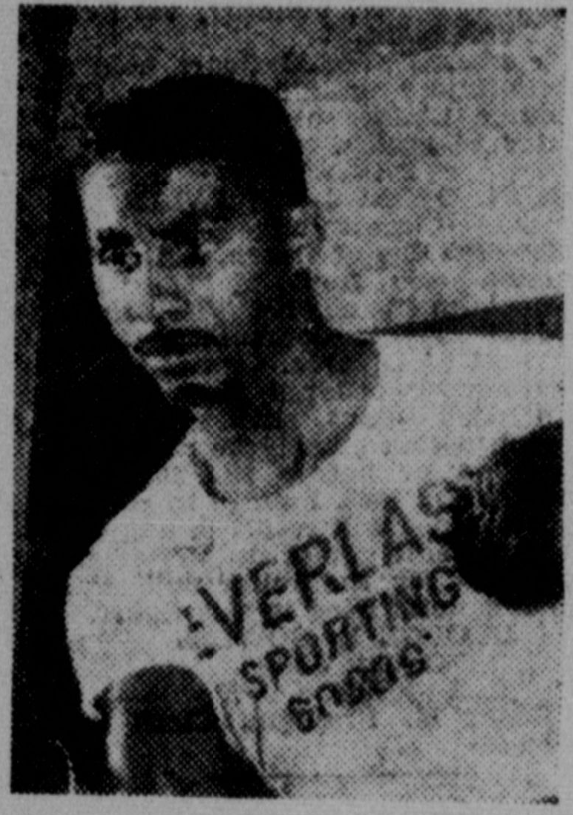
- picture of Wilbert McClure from 1963

Personal information
- Nickname: Skeeter
- Nationality: American
- Born: October 29, 1938 Toledo, Ohio
- Died: August 7, 2020 (aged 81)
- Height: 5 ft 11 in (180 cm)
- Weight: Middleweight

Boxing career
- Stance: Orthodox

Boxing record
- Total fights: 33
- Wins: 24
- Win by KO: 12
- Losses: 8
- Draws: 1
Medal record
Men's amateur boxing
Representing United States
Olympic Games
Gold medal – first place	1960 Rome	Light middleweight
Pan American Games
Gold medal – first place	1959 Chicago	Light middleweight

Wilbert McClure (October 29, 1938 – August 6, 2020) was an American professional boxer. As an amateur he won gold medals in the light middleweight division at the 1959 Pan American Games and the 1960 Olympics. As a professional he competed from 1961 to 1970.

== Personal ==
McClure earned degrees in literature and philosophy in 1961 from the University of Toledo and a doctorate in psychology from Wayne State University in Detroit in 1973. He later became a Massachusetts state boxing commissioner. He was honored in August 2012 for his life's work by the Charles Hamilton Houston Institute for Race and Justice at Harvard Law School.

McClure was found guilty in Wilson v. McClure et al, the first legal case in the US to reach a federal court jury to challenge the concept of same-race discrimination in September 2000. The case was brought by black licensed boxing promoter Zeke Wilson against a state sports commission headed by McClure, the chairman, for damage reparations and punitive redress after his right to conduct professional boxing events was violated.

White boxing commissioner William Pender performed direct discriminatory acts, while McClure failed to provide the promoter sufficient protection under his authority and cooperated in the unjust cancellation of a series of boxing events, causing financial harm to the promoter. A unanimous jury verdict found that McClure was guilty of racial discrimination along with Pender, and both defendants were assessed punitive damages in addition to the compensatory damages awarded by the jury.

The precedent-setting case is the subject of the non-fiction book, The Eighth Round. The book is being adapted into a motion picture by the same title.

== Amateur career ==
McClure defeated Carmelo Bossi to win the light middleweight gold medal for the United States at the 1960 Summer Olympics in Rome, Italy.

=== Amateur highlights ===
- 1960 U.S. Olympic trials 156-lb champion
- 1960 National AAU 156-lb champion
- 1959 Named Outstanding Amateur Boxer in the U.S.
- 1959 Pan American Games gold medalist
- 1959 National AAU champion
- 1959 160 lb Intercity Golden Gloves champion
- 1958 & 1959 160 lb Chicago Golden Gloves champion
- 1958 International Diamond Belt champion, Mexico City

== Professional career ==
Nicknamed "Skeeter", McClure turned pro in 1961 and had limited success. He never fought for a major title, and lost to notable pros Luis Manuel Rodríguez, Rubin Carter (and also drew once with Carter), and Johnny Pritchett before retiring in 1970 with a record of 24 wins (12 by Knockout), eight losses and one draw.
