= Philippe Diallo =

French association football administrator (born 1963)

President of the French Football Federation
- Incumbent
- Assumed office 11 January 2023
- Preceded by: Noël Le Graët

Personal details
- Born: Philippe Hamidou Diallo; 2 August 1963 (age 63) Saint-Nazaire, France
- Occupation: Football administrator

Philippe Hamidou Diallo (born 2 August 1963) is a French football administrator who is the president of the French Football Federation.

== Early life and career ==
Philippe Hamidou Diallo was born on 2 August 1963 in Saint-Nazaire, Loire-Atlantique to a Senegalese father and a French mother. His father, Souleymane Diallo, is a former boxing champion who represented France at the 1960 Summer Olympics. Philippe played at the FC Nantes youth ranks.

On 11 January 2023, Diallo was appointed president of the French Football Federation.

== FIFA presidency candidacy ==
With the FIFA presidency facing increasing challenges, particularly after the controversial 2026 FIFA World Cup, federations including UEFA are seeking to move beyond Gianni Infantino's presidency of world football. Philippe Diallo was chosen by UEFA on 16 November 2026 to run for the FIFA presidency.

== Honors and awards ==
Knight of the Order of Legion of Honour
