= Dave Paley =

Welsh boxer

Personal information
- Nationality: British (Welsh)
- Born: 25 May 1933 Barnsley, England
- Died: 31 January 2024 (aged 90) Monmouth, Wales

Sport
- Sport: Boxing
- Event: Light-heavyweight
- Club: Newport BC; Semtex BC, Tredegar

David Ramsden Paley (25 May 1933 – 31 January 2024) was a boxer who competed for Wales at the Commonwealth Games.

== Biography ==
Paley was born in Barnsley, England, and started boxing when training to be teacher. He lived in Llanllowell and represented Wales at international level and was the 1962 Universities light-heavyweight champion.

He quit boxing for two years to build his house and was a school teacher by trade and was the 1962 Welsh ABA champion at light-heavyweight. He boxed for the Semtex BC, a centre run by Dunlop Semtex.

He was selected for the 1962 Welsh team for the 1962 British Empire and Commonwealth Games in Perth, Australia. He competed in the light-heavyweight category, where he was beaten by eventual gold medallist Tony Madigan of Australia.

Paley was also twice Welsh ABA champion at heavyweight in 1959 and 1966.
