= Rogelio Reyes =

Mexican boxer (born 1942)

Personal information
- Born: 1 April 1942 (age 82); Tampico, Mexico

Sport
- Sport: Boxing

Rogelio Reyes (born 1 April 1942) is a Mexican boxer. He competed in the men's light welterweight event at the 1960 Summer Olympics.
