= Milo Calhoun =

Jamaican boxer (1940–1995)

Personal information
- Born: Cephas Colquhoun; 21 September 1940 Colony of Jamaica, British Empire
- Died: 15 March 1995 (aged 54) New York City
- Weight: middleweight light heavyweight cruiserweight

Boxing career

Boxing record
- Total fights: 46
- Wins: 24 (KO 4)
- Losses: 15 (KO 1)
- Draws: 7
Medal record
Men's amateur boxing
Representing Jamaica
British Empire and Commonwealth Games
| Gold medal – first place | 1962 Perth | Middleweight |
Central American and Caribbean Games
| Gold medal – first place | 1962 Kingston | Middleweight |

Cephas "Milo Calhoun" Colquhoun (21 September 1940 – 15 March 1995) was a Jamaican professional boxer of the 1960s and 1970s who won the British Commonwealth middleweight title. His professional fighting weight varied from 158 pounds (72 kg), i.e. middleweight to 183 pounds (83 kg), i.e. cruiserweight.
