= Harold Mann (boxer) =

Canadian boxer

Harold Mann (May 28, 1938 – October 23, 2016) was a Canadian boxer. He was born and raised in Prince George, British Columbia and lived most of his life there. He took up boxing at the age of 11 and as a young amateur won four provincial titles and three national titles (1958, 1961, 1962). In 1962 as a light middleweight he won the gold medal at the British Empire Games in Perth, defeating Brian Benson of Rhodesia and Nyasaland in the final. His overall record as an amateur was 82-8. From 1963 until 1967 he boxed professionally, going undefeated in 12 bouts. Following his retirement from competition, he coached for many years. In 2006 he was inducted into the British Columbia Sports Hall of Fame.
