= Llandaff Rowing Club =

Welsh rowing club

Coordinates: 51.4979°N 3.2241°W

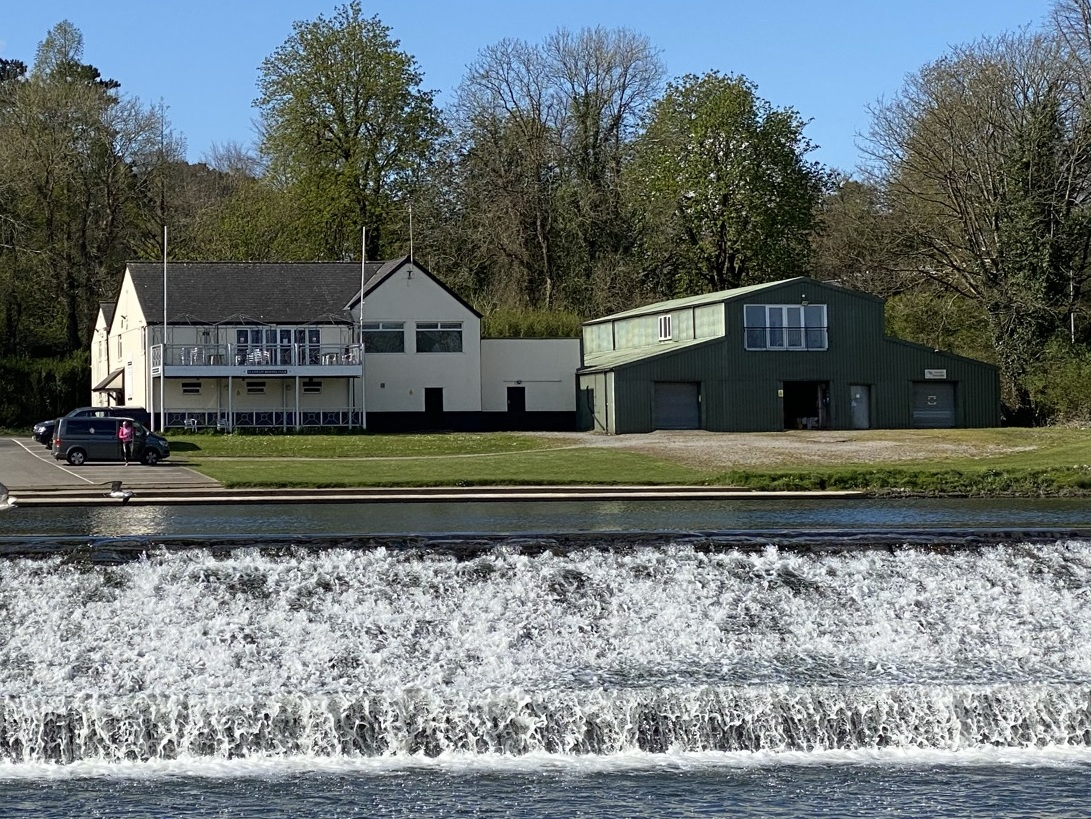

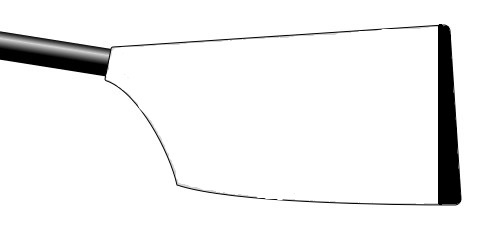
- Location: Llandaff, Cardiff, Wales
- Home water: River Taff
- Founded: 1946
- Affiliations: British Rowing boat code - LLA; WARA
- Website: www.llandaffrc.com

Events
- Annual Regatta (July); Pub and Club Fun Regatta (Aug-Oct)

Llandaff Rowing Club is a sport rowing club based on the River Taff in Llandaff, a district in the city of Cardiff, Wales. The club was founded in 1946 and is affiliated to the Welsh Amateur Rowing Association and to British Rowing.

== Location ==
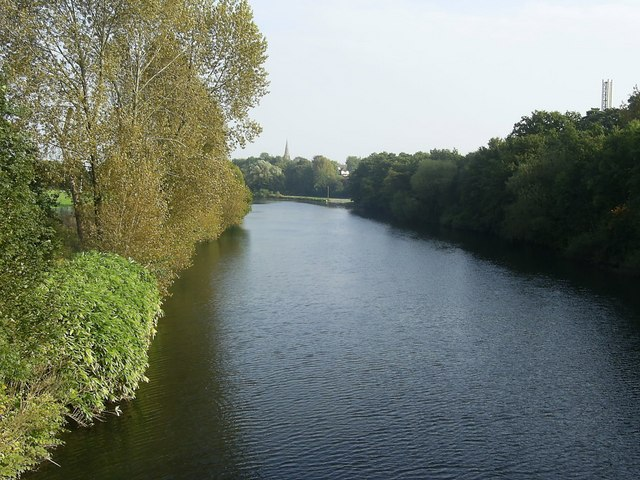
The stretch of the River Taff used by the club

The boathouse and facilities are based on the River Taff, in Llandaff. The stretch of the Taff rowed by the club is approximately 1,200 metres long with two obtuse bends and runs upstream from a weir, under the road bridge linking Llandaff to Llandaff North, ending where the river becomes too shallow.

== Rowing ==
The club includes of all levels of rowing, from a novice squad to top senior level crews of all stages. This includes a large junior squad, which has produced national level competitors, notably in recent history Zak Lee-Green (2010 GBR squad rower) and Hannah Patterson (2011 GBR junior squad rower).

The club's racing kit comprises black shorts and white singlet with a black hoop around the middle of the chest with the club logo in the centre of the band. Llandaff rowing blade spoons are painted white with a black vertical stripe.

The annual Llandaff Regatta is usually held over the second weekend in July. The club endeavours to draw new athletes to rowing both through an annual event known as the 'Pub and Club Regatta', and through 'Learn-to-Row' courses.

== History ==
The club was formed after World War II when members of Taff and Cardiff Rowing Clubs found their boathouses destroyed and their boats and memorabilia missing. Rowing started at the end of 1946 with the first regatta held in 1947.

In 1998 a land training facility was official opened by Rhodri Morgan, MP. The facility was supported by local business and by members of the club's social committee.

The Cardiff University Rowing Club (formerly the University College Cardiff Rowing Club) was based at Llandaff Rowing Club until 2006, when it relocated downriver to the Cardiff Bay Water Activity Centre in Grangetown.

== Notable members ==
Some famous members / alumni include:

- Jeremy Luke (silver medallist 1962 British Empire and Commonwealth Games)
- Tim Luke (silver medallist 1962 British Empire and Commonwealth Games)
- Charlie Wiggin (GBR squad rower; bronze medallist 1980 Moscow Olympic Games)
- David Luke (GBR squad rower; World Championship events)
- Robert Luke (GBR squad rower; World Championship events)
- Dave Currie (GBR squad rower; bronze medallist 2007 World Championships)
- Zak Lee-Green (GBR squad rower; bronze medallist 2010 World Rowing U23 Championships)
- Hannah Patterson (GBR Junior squad rower; silver and bronze medallist 2011 Junior European Rowing Championships (Coupe de la Jeunesse))

== Honours ==
=== Henley Royal Regatta ===
Year	Races won
2000	Fawley Challenge Cup

=== British champions ===
Year	Winning crew/s
1988	Women lightweight 2x
1996	Men J14 1x
2009	Open J18 4+, Women J18 8+
