= Ronnie Lendrum =

Welsh boxer

Personal information
- Nationality: British (Welsh)
- Born: 2 July 1938 Rhydyfelin, Ponytpridd, Wales
- Died: 26 February 2020 (aged 81) Bridgnorth, Shropshire, England

Sport
- Sport: Boxing
- Event: Bantamweight
- Club: Gilesports, Cardiff; Fisher BC, London; Worthing BC

Ronald John Lendrum born Chapple (2 July 1938 – 26 February 2020) was a boxer who competed for Wales at the Commonwealth Games.

== Biography ==
Lendrum, born in Rhydyfelin, moved to live with his sister in Worthing and started boxing at West Tarring County Secondary School in Worthing.

He boxed out of the Gilesports, Cardiff and Fisher, London, and was the 1960 Welsh ABA champion at featherweight. The following year boxing for Worthing BC, he won a second Welsh title but at the lighter weight of bantamweight. A machine minder for a window frame manufactuer called James Coupar, he struggled to maintain the weight in the bantamweight class and chose to step back up to featherweight.

Living in Browning Road and then Leigh Road, Worthing, and despite losing the top of three of his fingers in a work accident, he represented Wales at international level and in March 1962 won a third Welsh title at featherweight.

He was selected for the 1962 Welsh team for the 1962 British Empire and Commonwealth Games in Perth, Australia. He competed in the featherweight category, where he was beaten by Ted Stone of Australia in the quarter-final round.
