= The Eighth Round =

Book about a court case on same-race discrimination

- Author: Zeke Wilson (II)
- Language: English
- Genre: Non-fiction
- Publication date: 2005
- ISBN: 978-0-9825174-0-6

The Eighth Round by Zeke Wilson (II) is a non-fiction book that documents a precedent-setting court battle about same-race discrimination, which had previously not been legally defined.

This was the first case in the United States to reach a Federal court jury to challenge the concept of same-race discrimination. The case was brought on September 11, 2000, by Zeke Wilson, a Black licensed boxing promoter, against a state sports commission headed by a Black chairman. Wilson sought damage reparations and punitive redress after alleging his right to conduct professional boxing events was violated. His book later got turned into a short film of the same name, which was released in 2023.
