= Henryk Dampc =

Polish boxer

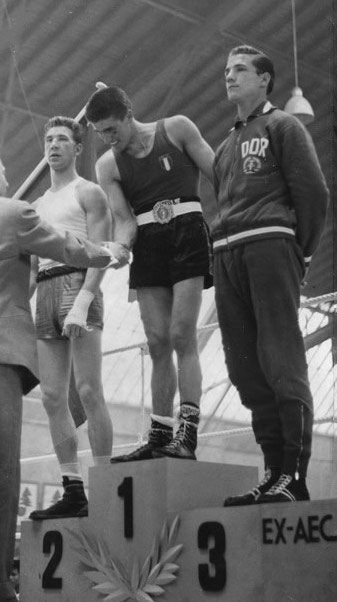
- Dampc (left) at the 1959 European Championships

Personal information
- Born: 12 April 1935 Wejherowo, Poland
- Died: 24 March 2000 (aged 64) Gdynia, Poland
- Height: 181 cm (5 ft 11 in)

Sport
- Sport: Boxing
Medal record
Representing Poland
European Championships
Silver medal – second place	1959 Lucerne	-71 kg

Henryk Dampc (12 April 1935 – 24 March 2000) was a Polish amateur boxer who won a silver medal in the light middleweight division at the 1959 European Championships. He competed at the 1960 Summer Olympics, but lost in the third bout to Willie Fisher.
