= William Fisher (boxer) =

Scottish boxer (1940–2018)

Willie Fisher
Personal information
- Nationality: British (Scottish)
- Born: 14 March 1940 Craigneuk, Wishaw, Scotland
- Died: 6 October 2018 (aged 78) Wishaw, Scotland

Sport
- Sport: boxing
Medal record
Representing Great Britain
Men's Boxing
Bronze medal – third place	1960 Rome	Light middleweight

William Fisher (14 March 1940 – 6 October 2018) was a Scottish boxer. He was born in Craigneuk and boxed under the names Willie Fisher and Billy Fisher.

== Boxing career ==
=== Amateur career ===
Fisher won the 1960 Amateur Boxing Association British light-middleweight title, when boxing out of the Craigneuk ABC. Fisher represented Great Britain at the 1960 Rome Olympic Games. He won a bronze medal at light middleweight.

=== Pro career ===
Fisher turned pro in 1961 and spent his entire career fighting in Great Britain. He retired in 1967 with a record of 21-12 with 9 KO.
