= Charles Rice (fireman) =

American Civil War Medal of Honor recipient (1840–1895)

Fireman, Second Class Charles Rice
- Born: 1840; Russia
- Died: 9 September 1895 (aged 54–55); Westbrook, Maine
- Burial place: Unknown
- Military career
- Allegiance: United States (Union)
- Branch: Navy
- Rank: Fireman, Second Class (E-2)
- Unit: USS Agawam
- Conflicts: First Battle of Fort Fisher
- Awards: Medal of Honor

Charles Rice (1840 - 9 September 1895) was a Russian-born fireman, second class (E-2 rank) of the United States Navy who was awarded the Medal of Honor for gallantry during the American Civil War. On 23 December 1864, Rice was part of a volunteer crew that guided and exploded a powder boat near Fort Fisher in North Carolina. The raid was successful, setting the fort ablaze for at least one day. Rice was awarded the Medal of Honor for his actions in the raid on 31 December 1864, and was presented with the award on 12 May 1865 aboard the USS Agawam.

== Personal life ==
Rice was born in Russia in 1840. Not much is known about his early life before his enlistment in the U.S. Navy at Portland, Maine. Rice died on 9 September 1895 in Westbrook, Cumberland County, Maine. It is unknown where he is buried.

== Military service ==
In the navy, Rice was a coal heaver and attained the rank of fireman, second class (E-2). He served on the USS Agawam. On the date he won the Medal of Honor, he volunteered to join a crew attempting to detonate a powder boat pulled by the USS Wilderness near the Confederate-controlled Fort Fisher.

Rice's Medal of Honor citation reads:

On board the U.S.S. Agawam as one of a volunteer crew of a powder boat which was exploded near Fort Fisher, 23 December 1864. The powder boat, towed in by the Wilderness to prevent detection by the enemy, cast off and slowly steamed to within 300 yards of the beach. After fuses and fires had been lit and a second anchor with short scope let go to assure the boat's tailing inshore, the crew boarded the Wilderness and proceeded a distance of 12 miles from shore. Less than two hours later the explosion took place, and the following day, fires were observed still burning at the fort.

— R. A. Alger, Secretary of War
