= Ekitiibwa kya Buganda =

Official anthem of the Kingdom of Buganda

English: "The Pride of Buganda"
- National anthem of Buganda
- Music: Polycarp Kakooza, 1939

"Ekitiibwa kya Buganda" (lit. 'The Pride of Buganda') is the official anthem of the Kingdom of Buganda. It was composed in 1939 by Rev Polycarp Kakooza.

== Lyrics ==
The lyrics are in the Luganda language. Traditionally, the full version is only sung in the presence of the Kabaka. Otherwise the short version, consisting of verses 1 and 4 plus the chorus, is sung.

Luganda original

Chorus:
Twesiimye nnyo, twesiimye nnyo
Olwa Buganda yaffe
Ekitiibwa kya Buganda kyava dda
Naffe tukikuumenga

I
Okuva edda n'edda eryo lyonna
Lino eggwanga Buganda
Nti lyamanyibwa nnyo eggwanga lyaffe
Okwetoloola ensi yonna

II
Abazira ennyo abatusooka
Baalwana nnyo mu ntalo
Ne balyagala nnyo eggwanga lyaffe
Naffe tulyagalenga

III
Ffe abaana ba leero ka tulwane
Okukuza Buganda
Nga tujjukira nnyo bajjajja baffe
Baafirira ensi yaffe

IV
Nze naayimba ntya ne sitenda
Ssaabasajja Kabaka
Asaanira afuge Obuganda bwonna
Naffe nga tumwesiga

V
Katonda omulungi ow'ekisa
Otubeere Mukama
Otubundugguleko emikisa gyo era
Bbaffe omukuumenga

English translation

Chorus:
We are blessed, we are blessed
For our Buganda
Buganda's pride dates back in time
Let us also uphold it forever

I
Since time immemorial,
This country Buganda
Was known by all countries
Around the world

II
The brave who came before us
Fought a lot of wars
And loved this country a lot
So we should also love it

III
Let the current generation fight
To uphold Buganda
As we remember our ancestors
Who died for this country

IV
How will I sing and not praise
The King
He deserves to rule all of Buganda
So let us trust him

V
God of kindness
Help us Lord
And pour your blessings
And keep our king
