= Ronald Holmes (boxer) =

Jamaican boxer (born 1934)

Personal information
- Nationality: Jamaican
- Born: 22 November 1934 (age 91)

Sport
- Sport: Boxing
Medal record
Men's amateur boxing
Representing Jamaica
Pan American Games
Silver medal – second place	1963 São Paulo	Light-heavyweight
Central American and Caribbean Games
Gold medal – first place	1962 Kingston	Light-heavyweight

Ronald Holmes (born 22 November 1934) is a former Jamaican boxer. He competed in the men's light heavyweight event at the 1964 Summer Olympics. Holmes won a silver medal at the 1963 Pan American Games and a gold medal at the 1962 Central American and Caribbean Games.
