= Same-race discrimination =

Same-race discrimination is a form of racism wherein the perpetrator and the object of the discrimination are of the same racial group.

The first case in the US to reach a Federal court jury to challenge the concept of same-race discrimination occurred on September 11, 2000, when a case was brought by black licensed boxing promoter Zeke Wilson against a state sports commission headed by a black chairman, asking for damage reparations and punitive redress after his right to conduct professional boxing events was violated.

White Boxing Commissioner William Pender performed direct discriminatory acts, while the black Commission Chairman Wilbert McClure failed to provide the promoter sufficient protection under his authority and co-operated in the unjust cancellation of a series of boxing events, causing financial harm to the promoter. A unanimous jury verdict found that McClure was guilty of racial discrimination along with Pender, and both defendants were assessed punitive damages in addition to the compensatory damages awarded by the jury. Wilson wrote a book titled The Eighth Round about the incident.
