= Gerald Freeman =

Australian boxer

Personal information
- Nationality: Australian
- Born: 5 January 1941 (age 84); Bothwell, Tasmania, Australia

Sport
- Sport: Boxing

Gerald Freeman (born 5 January 1941) is an Australian boxer. He competed in the men's light welterweight event at the 1960 Summer Olympics. At the 1960 Summer Olympics, he lost to Jaggie van Staden of Rhodesia.
