= Miguel Amarista =

Venezuelan boxer

Personal information
- Full name: Miguel Alonzo Amarista Vargas
- Born: 30 September 1939 (age 86) Yaparaguaro, Venezuela

Sport
- Sport: Boxing

Miguel Amarista (born 30 September 1939) is a Venezuelan boxer. He competed in the men's light welterweight event at the 1960 Summer Olympics
