= Jaggie van Staden =

Rhodesian boxer (born 1942)

Personal information
- Full name: Jurgens Johannes van Staden
- Nationality: Rhodesian
- Born: 14 January 1942 (age 83); Bulawayo, Southern Rhodesia

Sport
- Sport: Boxing

Jaggie van Staden (born 14 January 1942) is a Rhodesian former boxer. He competed in the men's light welterweight event at the 1960 Summer Olympics. At the 1960 Summer Olympics, he defeated Gerald Freeman of Australia in the Round of 32, before losing to Sayed El-Nahas of the United Arab Republic in the Round of 16.

Van Staden also represented Rhodesia and Nyasaland at the 1962 British Empire and Commonwealth Games.
