= Souleymane Diallo (boxer) =

French boxer (born 1937)

Personal information
- Nationality: French
- Born: 12 February 1937 (age 89) Dakar, Senegal

Sport
- Sport: Boxing

Souleymane Diallo (born 12 February 1937) is a French boxer. He competed in the men's light middleweight event at the 1960 Summer Olympics.

He is the father of Philippe Diallo, who is the president of the French Football Federation.

Diallo's relatives in Senegal live in Dakar and Saint-Louis. He also speaks Wolof.
