= Isaac Aryee =

Ghanaian boxer

Personal information
- Nationality: Ghanaian
- Born: 1 April 1941 (age 84); Accra, Gold Coast (now Ghana)

Sport
- Sport: Boxing

Isaac Aryee (born 1 April 1941) is a Ghanaian boxer. He competed at the 1960 Summer Olympics, the 1962 British Empire and Commonwealth Games, and the 1964 Summer Olympics.

== 1964 Olympic results ==
Below is the record of Isaac Aryee, a Ghanaian bantamweight boxer who competed at the 1964 Tokyo Olympics:

- Round of 32: defeated Thein Myint (Burma) by knockout
- Round of 16: lost to Takao Sakuri (Japan) by decision, 0-5
