= Quincey Daniels =

American boxer

Personal information
- Born: August 4, 1941 (age 85) San Diego, California, U.S.
- Height: 5 ft 7 in (170 cm)
- Weight: 139 lb (63 kg)

Sport
- Sport: Boxing
- Weight class: Light welterweight (-63.5 kg)
Medal record
Men's boxing
Representing the United States
Olympic Games
Bronze medal – third place	1960 Rome	Light welterweight
Pan American Games
Bronze medal – third place	1963 São Paulo	Light welterweight

Quincey Daniels (born August 4, 1941, in San Diego, California) is an American former light welterweight boxer.

== Amateur ==
Daniels, boxing at 139 pounds, captured a bronze medal for the United States, at the 1960 Rome Olympiad. At the time of the Olympics, Daniels was in the United States Air Force. Daniels was also the 1959 United States Amateur Lightweight champion and the 1970 United States Amateur Light welterweight champion.

== 1960 Olympic results ==
Below is the record of Quincey Daniels, an American light welterweight boxer who competed at the 1960 Rome Olympics:

- Round of 64: bye
- Round of 32: defeated Alexsandr Mitsev (Bulgaria) by decision, 5–0
- Round of 16: defeated Bobby Kelsey (Great Britain) by decision, 4–1
- Quarterfinal: defeated Sayed El-Nahas (United Arab Republic) by decision, 5–0
- Semifinal: lost to Bohumil Nemecek (Czechoslovakia) by decision, 0–5 (was awarded bronze medal)
