= Piero Brandi =

Italian boxer

Personal information
- Nationality: Italian
- Born: 22 January 1939; Arezzo, Italy
- Died: 23 November 2004 (aged 65); Arezzo, Italy

Sport
- Sport: Boxing

Piero Brandi (22 January 1939 – 23 November 2004) was an Italian boxer. He competed in the men's light welterweight event at the 1960 Summer Olympics.
