= Harvey Reti =

Canadian boxer (1937–2020)

Personal information
- Born: 1 September 1937; Paddockwood, Saskatchewan, Canada
- Died: 3 January 2020 (aged 82); Whitehorse, Yukon, Canada

Sport
- Sport: Boxing

Harvey Neil Reti (1 September 1937 – 3 January 2020) was a Canadian boxer. He won a bronze medal at the 1962 Commonwealth Games in Perth, Australia, and competed in the men's light welterweight event at the 1964 Summer Olympics. At the 1964 Summer Olympics, he lost to István Tóth of Hungary.
