= Peter Odhiambo (boxer, born 1927) =

Ugandan boxer (born 1937)

Personal information
- Nationality: Ugandan
- Born: 9 September 1937 (age 87); Kisumu, Kenya

Sport
- Sport: Boxing

Peter Paul Odhiambo (born 9 September 1937) was a Kenyan-born Ugandan boxer. He competed in the men's middleweight event at the 1960 Summer Olympics and the men's 75 kg event at the 1962 British Empire and Commonwealth Games. At the 1960 Summer Olympics, he lost to Eddie Crook Jr. of the United States.
