= Wallace Coe =

New Zealand boxer

Medal record

Representing New Zealand

Men's Boxing

British Empire Games
Gold medal – first place	1962 Perth	Welterweight

Wallace Coe (1937-2026) was a former New Zealand boxer.

He won the gold medal in the men's 64 – 69 kg (welterweight) division at the 1962 British Empire and Commonwealth Games.

Coe died in 2026, age 88.
