= Clement Quartey =

Ghanaian boxer (1938–2024)

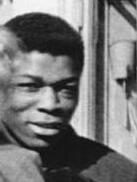
- Quartey in 1962

Personal information
- Nationality: Ghanaian
- Born: 12 April 1938 Accra, Gold Coast (now Ghana)
- Died: 2 November 2024 (aged 86) London, United Kingdom

Sport
- Sport: Boxing
Medal record
Men's Boxing
Representing Ghana
Olympic Games
| Silver medal – second place | 1960 Rome | Light Welterweight |

Clement Isaac Quartey (12 April 1938 – 2 November 2024) was a Ghanaian boxer. He won the silver medal in the men's Light Welterweight (63.5 kg) category at the 1960 Summer Olympics in Rome, Italy, thus becoming Ghana’s first Olympic medalist. and the first Black African to win an Olympic medal.

== Life and career ==
Better known as "Isaac" or "Ike", he was born in Accra, Ghana on 12 April 1938. Clement was an older brother of former welterweight champion Ike Quartey. He was the first Ghanaian to win a medal at the Olympics, and he also won a gold medal at the 1962 British Empire and Commonwealth Games held in Perth, Western Australia. Quartey died in London on 2 November 2024, at the age of 86.

== Fights ==
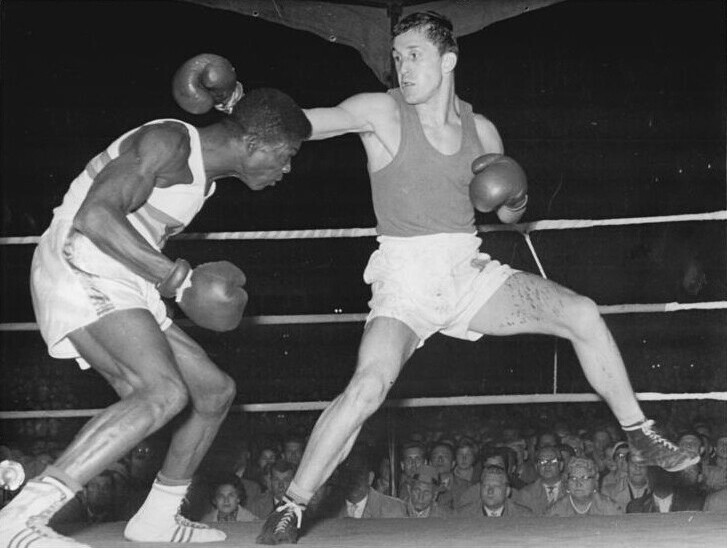
Quartey (left) in a fight against Wilfried Rühl, 1962

Olympic games results 1960 (as a Light welterweight)

Defeated Mohamed Boubekeur (Romania) 5-0

Defeated Khalid Al-Karkhi (Iraq) 5-0

Defeated Kim Deuk-Bong (South Korea) 3-2

Defeated Marian Kasprzyk (Poland) walk-over

Lost to Bohumil Nemecek (Czechoslovakia) 0-5
