= Thomas Arimi =

Ghanaian boxer

Personal information
- Nationality: Ghanaian
- Born: 17 October 1933 (age 91)

Sport
- Sport: Boxing

Thomas Arimi (born 17 October 1933) is a Ghanaian boxer. He competed in the men's light heavyweight event at the 1964 Summer Olympics.
