= National Council of Sports (Uganda) =

Statutory body in Uganda

Agency overview
- Formed: 1964
- Status: Statutory sports regulatory body
- Headquarters: Lugogo Sports Complex, Kampala, Uganda
- Parent department: Ministry of Education and Sports (Uganda)
- Website: www.ncs.go.ug

The National Council of Sports (Uganda) is a statutory body in Uganda mandated to regulate, develop, and promote sports across the country. It operates under the supervision of the Ministry of Education and Sports.

== History ==
The NCS was established after the enactment of the National Council of Sports Act, 1964. In 2023, the National Sports Act, 2023 was passed, updating the framework for the governance of sport and expanding the Council’s regulatory functions.

== Mandate and functions ==
The functions of the Council include:

- Registration and recognition of national sports associations and federations.
- Promoting and regulating activities of national sports bodies.
- Developing and maintaining public sports facilities.
- Identifying and nurturing sports talent.
- Organizing and sanctioning national and international sports competitions.
- Ensuring accountability of funds disbursed to sports federations.

== Governance ==
The NCS is governed by a board whose members are appointed by the Minister of Education and Sports. The Council is currently chaired by Ambrose Tashobya (2024–2028 term), with Dr. Bernard Patrick Ogwel serving as the General Secretary.

== Recent developments ==
- In 2025, the Council gazetted 45 compliant sports federations and associations under the new National Sports Act.
- In 2024/2025, the Council announced budget cuts affecting allocations to sports federations.

== See also ==
- Sport in Uganda
- Uganda Olympic Committee
