= Frank Nyangweso =

Ugandan boxer

Francis Were Nyangweso
Personal information
- Nationality: Ugandan
- Born: 29 September 1939 Busia, Uganda
- Died: 15 February 2011 (aged 71) Kampala, Uganda

Sport
- Sport: Boxing

Francis Were Nyangweso (29 September 1939 – 15 February 2011) was a Ugandan boxer. He competed in the men's light middleweight event at the 1960 Summer Olympics. He later went on to work in sports administration in Uganda, as well as becoming a general in the Ugandan Army, before being caught up in a bribery scandal at the 2000 Summer Olympics.

== Biography ==
Nyangweso was born in Busia, Uganda in 1939. He was the captain of Uganda's national boxing team from 1955 to 1962.

At the 1960 Summer Olympics in Rome, Nyangweso competed in the men's light middleweight event. He lost in the second round of the competition to Wilbert McClure of the United States, with McClure going on to win the gold medal. Despite his defeat at the Olympics, Nyangweso won the gold medal at the Hapoel Games in 1961, and a bronze medal at the 1962 British Empire and Commonwealth Games.

In 1963, Nyangweso graduated from military school and became a general in the Ugandan Army. Eight years later, Idi Amin appointed Nyangweso to the post of Army Commander and Chief of Staff. Under Amin's dictatorship, Nyangweso was the acting Head of State for a short time in 1975 while Amin was on holiday.

Nyangweso was the team manager for Uganda's boxing team at the 1968 Summer Olympics, and Uganda's chef de mission for the 1972 Summer Olympics and the 1980 Summer Olympics. He then moved up to be the Ugandan Boxing Federation's President for two spells from 1967 to 1972 and from 1979 to 1995. Nyangweso was also the President of the African Boxing Confederation from 1974 to 1978. After serving on the board of the Association Internationale de Boxe Amateur from 1981 to 1986, Nyangweso served as their Vice-President from 1986 to 2006. At Olympic level, Nyangweso was the Vice-President of the Association of National Olympic Committees from 1999 to 2001, as well as the President of the Uganda Olympic Committee from 1971 to 2009.

In 1999, Nyangweso was caught up in an Olympic bribery scandal, but was later cleared following an investigation. He died in February 2011 in Kampala, aged 71.
