= John Sentongo =

Ugandan boxer

Personal information
- Nationality: Ugandan
- Born: 1 August 1938 (age 86); Kibuye, Uganda

Sport
- Sport: Boxing

John Makula Sentongo (born 1 August 1938) is a Ugandan former boxer. He competed in the men's bantamweight event at the 1960 Summer Olympics. At the 1960 Summer Olympics, he received a bye in the Round of 64, but lost in the Round of 32 to Brunon Bendig of Poland.
