= New Zealand at the 1970 British Commonwealth Games =

- CG code: NZL
- CGA: New Zealand Olympic and British Commonwealth Games Association
- Website: www.olympic.org.nz

in Edinburgh, Scotland
- Competitors: 65
- Flag bearers: Opening: Les Mills; Closing: Harry Kent
- Officials: 19
- Medals Ranked 11th: Gold 2 Silver 6 Bronze 6 Total 14

British Commonwealth Games appearances
- 1930; 1934; 1938; 1950; 1954; 1958; 1962; 1966; 1970; 1974; 1978; 1982; 1986; 1990; 1994; 1998; 2002; 2006; 2010; 2014; 2018; 2022; 2026; 2030

New Zealand at the 1970 British Commonwealth Games was represented by a team of 65 competitors and 19 officials. Selection of the team for the Games in Edinburgh, Scotland, was the responsibility of the New Zealand Olympic and British Commonwealth Games Association. New Zealand's flagbearer at the opening ceremony was field athlete Les Mills. The New Zealand team finished 11th on the medal table, winning a total of 14 medals, two of which were gold.

New Zealand has competed in every games, starting with the British Empire Games in 1930 at Hamilton, Ontario.

== Medal tables ==
New Zealand was 11th in the medal table in 1970, with a total of 14 medals, including two gold.

Medal	Name	Sport	Event
Gold	Bruce Biddle	Cycling	Men's individual road race
Gold	Harry Kent	Cycling	Men's 1 km time trial
Silver	Les Mills	Athletics	Men's discus throw
Silver	Barbara Poulsen	Athletics	Women's shot put
Silver	Dick Quax	Athletics	Men's 1500 m
Silver	Bob McDonald; Robbie Robson	Lawn bowls	Men's pairs
Silver	John Bolton	Weightlifting	Men's light heavyweight
Silver	Tony Ebert	Weightlifting	Men's middleweight
Bronze	Les Mills	Athletics	Men's shot put
Bronze	Blair Stockwell	Cycling	Men's 4000 m individual pursuit
Bronze	Mark Treffers	Swimming	Men's 1500 m freestyle
Bronze	Bruce Cameron	Weightlifting	Men's lightweight
Bronze	David Aspin	Wrestling	Men's middleweight
Bronze	Gordon Mackay	Wrestling	Men's welterweight

Medals by sport
Sport	Gold medal	Silver medal	Bronze medal	Total
Cycling	2	0	1	3
Athletics	0	3	1	4
Weightlifting	0	2	1	3
Lawn bowls	0	1	0	1
Wrestling	0	0	2	2
Swimming	0	0	1	1
Total	2	6	6	14

Medals by gender
Gender	Gold medal	Silver medal	Bronze medal	Total
Male	2	5	6	13
Female	0	1	0	1
Total	2	6	6	14

== Athletics ==
=== Track and road ===
Athlete	Event	Heat		Semifinal		Final	
Athlete	Event	Result	Rank (Note: Ranks given are within the heat)	Result	Rank (Note: Ranks given are within the semifinal)	Result	Rank
Jack Foster	Men's marathon	—N/a				2:14:44	4
Penny Hunt	Women's 100 m	11.7	2 Q	11.9	7	did not advance	
Penny Hunt	Women's 200 m	23.9	3 Q	23.9	4 Q	23.8	8
Roger Johnson	Men's 400 m hurdles	51.9	3 Q	52.0	5	did not advance	
Jeff Julian	Men's marathon	—N/a				2:24:03	18
Sylvia Potts	Women's 800 m	2:07.4	2 Q	—N/a		2:09.7	5
Sylvia Potts	Women's 1500 m	—N/a				4:25.2	9
Dick Quax	Men's 1500 m	3:44.2	1 Q	—N/a		3:38.1	2nd place, silver medalist(s)
Dick Quax	Men's 5000 m	14:01.6	4 Q	—N/a		13:43.4	7
Val Robinson	Women's 1500 m	—N/a				4:22.2	6
Anne Smith	Women's 800 m	2:07.3	6	—N/a		did not advance	
Anne Smith	Women's 1500 m	—N/a				4:26.8	10
Dick Tayler	Men's 1500 m	3:44.3	4 Q	—N/a		3:45.0	10
Dick Tayler	Men's 5000 m	14:11.8	5 Q	—N/a		13:48.8	10

=== Field ===
Athlete	Event	Qualifying		Final	
Athlete	Event	Result	Rank	Result	Rank
Joe Antunovich	Men's discus throw	—N/a		53.50 m	7
Diane Charteris	Women's discus throw	—N/a		44.12 m	8
Diane Charteris	Women's shot put	—N/a		13.59 m	6
Pamela Hendren	Women's long jump	—N/a		5.72 m	10
Sally Mene	Women's discus throw	—N/a		45.86 m	7
Sally Mene	Women's javelin throw	—N/a		39.94 m	8
Les Mills	Men's discus throw	—N/a		57.84 m	2nd place, silver medalist(s)
Les Mills	Men's shot put	—N/a		18.40 m	3rd place, bronze medalist(s)
Warwick Nicholl	Men's hammer throw	—N/a		60.02 m	6
Dave Norris	Men's long jump	7.43 m	6 Q	7.64 m	5
Dave Norris	Men's triple jump	15.01 m	=11 Q	14.46 m	11
Barbara Poulsen	Women's shot put	—N/a		15.87 m	2nd place, silver medalist(s)
Robin Tait	Men's discus throw	—N/a		53.82 m	6

=== Combined ===
Athlete	Event	100 m	Long jump	Shot put	High jump	400 m	110 m hurdles	Discus throw	Pole vault	Javelin throw	1500 m	Overall points	Rank
Roger Main	Men's decathlon	11.2; 756 pts	6.40 m 693 pts	13.25 m 681 pts	1.67 m 560 pts	51.0; 762 pts	15.4; 807 pts	39.00 m 666 pts	3.60 m 700 pts	40.28 m 495 pts	4:56.4; 428 pts	6548 pts	7
Roy Williams	Men's decathlon	11.2; 756 pts	6.97 m 814 pts	12.57 m 637 pts	Withdrew							DNF	

== Badminton ==
Athlete	Event	Round of 64	Round of 32	Round of 16	Quarterfinal	Semifinal	Final / BM	Rank
Athlete	Event	Opposition Result	Opposition Result	Opposition Result	Opposition Result	Opposition Result	Opposition Result	Rank
John Compton	Men's singles	Goel (IND); L 2–15 6–15	did not advance					
Alison Glenie	Women's singles	—N/a	Ridgway (CAN); L 11–5 5–11 2–11	did not advance				
Robin Glenie	Women's singles	—N/a	Nyirati (AUS); L 3–11 1–11	did not advance				
Richard Purser	Men's singles	Gulam (KEN); W 15–2 15–3	Yeo (SIN); W 15–10 14–17 15–10	Bhatia (IND); W 15–7 18–14	Paulson (CAN); L 9–15 8–15	did not advance		
John Compton; Richard Purser	Men's doubles	—N/a	Ward / Montegriffo (GIB); W 15–1 15–3	Charron / Paterson (CAN); L 15–5 10–15 9–15	did not advance			
Alison Glenie; Robin Glenie	Women's doubles	—N/a		Tan / Ng (MAS); L 9–15 8–15	did not advance			
Alison Glenie; Richard Purser	Mixed doubles	—N/a	Ang / Ng (MAS); W 18–13 3–15 15–12	Whetnall / Eddy (ENG); L 12–15 5–15	did not advance			
Robin Glenie; John Compton	Mixed doubles	—N/a	Haddad / Haddad (JAM); W 15–6 15–2	Rickard / Whetnall (ENG); L 3–15 18–17 6–15	did not advance			

== Boxing ==
Athlete	Event	Round of 16	Quarterfinal	Semifinal	Final	Rank
Athlete	Event	Opposition Result	Opposition Result	Opposition Result	Opposition Result	Rank
Brian Kendall	Featherweight	Yang (PNG); W	Mir (PAK); L	did not advance		
Ali Afakasi	Welterweight	Olulu (KEN); L	did not advance			

== Cycling ==
=== Road ===
Men's road race

Athlete	Time	Rank
Bryce Beeston	4:41:24	5
Bruce Biddle	4:38:58	1st place, gold medalist(s)

=== Track ===
Men's 1000 m sprint

Athlete	Round 1	First-round repechages				Round 2	Second-round repechage	Round 3	Third-round repechages			Quarterfinals	Semifinals	Final / BM	
Athlete	Round 1	Round 1	Round 2	Round 3	Round 4	Round 2	Second-round repechage	Round 3	Round 1	Round 2	Round 3	Quarterfinals	Semifinals	Final / BM	
Athlete	Opposition Result	Opposition Result	Opposition Result	Opposition Result	Opposition Result	Opposition Result	Opposition Result	Opposition Result	Opposition Result	Opposition Result	Opposition Result	Opposition Result	Opposition Result	Opposition Result	Rank
Harry Kent	Crutchlow (ENG); W 11.80	Bye				John (TTO); W 11.56	Bye	Bicknell (ENG); W 11.95	Bye			Attong (TTO); W 12.31, W 12.63	Johnson (AUS); W 11.95, L, L	King (TTO); L, W 11.94, L	4
Bryce Preston	Beattie (NIR); W 12.23	Bye				Perkins (AUS); L	Crutchlow (ENG); W 13.07	Harvey (CAN); L	Rowe (ENG); W 12.36	Bye	Bicknell (ENG); W 13.32	Nicholson (AUS); L, W 12.94, L	did not advance		=5
Max Vertongen	McMillan (JAM); W 12.04	Bye				Hunte (GUY); L	John (TTO); L	did not advance							=13

Men's tandem 2000 m sprint

Athletes	Round 1	Repechage	Semifinals	Final / BM	
Athletes	Opposition Result	Opposition Result	Opposition Result	Opposition Result	Rank
Bryce Preston; Max Vertongen	Attong / Farrell (TTO); W 11.65, W 11.74	Bye	Harvey / Lovell (CAN); W 14.82, L, L	Hatfield / Beswick (WAL); L, L	4

Men's 1 km time trial

Athlete	Time	Rank
Harry Kent	1:08.69 GR	1st place, gold medalist(s)
Blair Stockwell	1:12.33	10

Men's 4000 m individual pursuit

Athlete	Qualification		Quarterfinals	Semifinals	Final / BM	Rank
Athlete	Time	Rank	Opponent Result	Opponent Result	Opponent Result	Rank
Blair Stockwell	5:11.93	4 Q	Moore (ENG); W 5:12.32	Clark (AUS); L 5:09.17	Watson (AUS); W OVL	3rd place, bronze medalist(s)

Men's 10 miles scratch race

Athlete	Heats		Final	
Athlete	Time	Rank (Note: Ranks given are within each of the two heats. First 10 finishers in each heat advanced to the final.)	Time	Rank
Harry Kent	NR	4 Q	20:54.56	6
Bryce Preston	NR	5 Q	20:53.95	5
Max Vertongen	NR	5 Q	20:53.80	4

== Diving ==
Athlete	Event	Points	Rank
Cyril Buscke	Men's 3 m springboard	DNF	
Rebecca Ewert	Women's 3 m springboard	337.74	7
Mark Gazley	Men's 3 m springboard	436.44	6

== Fencing ==
=== Men ===
==== Individual ====
Épée

Athlete	First round pool								Semifinal pool						Final pool						Rank
Athlete	Opposition Result	Opposition Result	Opposition Result	Opposition Result	Opposition Result	Opposition Result	Opposition Result	Wins	Opposition Result	Opposition Result	Opposition Result	Opposition Result	Opposition Result	Wins	Opposition Result	Opposition Result	Opposition Result	Opposition Result	Opposition Result	Wins	Rank
Arthur Gatland	Gray (NIR); W 5–3	Chong (MAS); W 5–3	Scotland (DMA); W 5–0	Nasralla (JAM); L 2–5	Mills (AUS); L 1–5	Sandor (SCO); L 2–5	Johnson (ENG); L 1–5	3	Did not advance												
Michael Henderson	Hoskyns (ENG); L 1–5	Widmaier (CAN); L 0–5	Rouxel (SCO); L 4–5	Simon (AUS); L 4–5	Turner (WAL); L 2–5	Magill (NIR); W 5–2	Cunningham (HKG); W 5–2	2	Did not advance												
Richard Peterson	Bakonyi (CAN); W 5–4	Richardson (NIR); W 5–3	Elliott (HKG); W 5–2	Chan (MAS); W 5–4	Jacobs (ENG); W 5–3	Lucas (WAL); L 4–5	—N/a	5 Q	Johnson (ENG); W 5–5	Bakonyi (CAN); L 2–5	Jacobs (ENG); L 2–5	Redhead (GUE); L 4–5	Rouxel (SCO); L 3–5	1	did not advance						

Foil

Athlete	First round pool								Semifinal pool						Final pool						Rank
Athlete	Opposition Result	Opposition Result	Opposition Result	Opposition Result	Opposition Result	Opposition Result	Opposition Result	Wins	Opposition Result	Opposition Result	Opposition Result	Opposition Result	Opposition Result	Wins	Opposition Result	Opposition Result	Opposition Result	Opposition Result	Opposition Result	Wins	Rank
Michael Henderson	Magill (NIR); L 1–5	G. Paul (ENG); L 2–5	Sandor (SCO); W 5–2	Chong (MAS); W 5–2	Nasralla (JAM); W 5–2	Mills (AUS); L 3–5	Edwards (WAL); L 1–5	3	Did not advance												
Richard Peterson	Wiedel (CAN); W 5–4	Russell (SCO); L 1–5	Redhead (GUE); W 5–2	A. Reynolds (WAL); W 5–3	B. Paul (ENG); L 1–5	Cunningham (HKG); W 5–1	Theseira (MAS); L 2–5	4	Did not advance												
Brian Pickworth	Breckin (ENG); L 3–5	Simon (AUS); L 3–5	Widmaier (CAN); W 5–3	Gray (NIR); W 5–2	Jackson (JAM); W 5–0	Scotland (DMA); W 5–0	Elliott (HKG); L 4–5	4 Q	Smith (SCO); W 5–1	Wiedel (CAN); W 5–2	Benko (AUS); L 3–5	Breckin (ENG); L 4–5	Russell (SCO); L 3–5	2 Q	Breckin (ENG); L 1–5	B. Paul (ENG); L 4–5	G. Paul (ENG); L 4–5	Benko (AUS); L 3–5	Conyd (CAN); W 5–4	1	5

Sabre

Athlete	First round pool							Semifinal pool						Final pool						Rank
Athlete	Opposition Result	Opposition Result	Opposition Result	Opposition Result	Opposition Result	Opposition Result	Wins	Opposition Result	Opposition Result	Opposition Result	Opposition Result	Opposition Result	Wins	Opposition Result	Opposition Result	Opposition Result	Opposition Result	Opposition Result	Wins	Rank
Michael Henderson	Richardson (NIR); W 5–3	Acfield (ENG); L 1–5	Samek (CAN); L 2–5	Tornallyay (AUS); L 4–5	Chan (MAS); W 5–3	Edwards (WAL); L 4–5	2	Did not advance												
Richard Peterson	Gray (NIR); W 5–2	Urban (CAN); L 3–5	Craig (ENG); L 1–5	Mitchell (SCO); W 5–4	Tye (HKG); W 5–1	Chong (MAS); W 5–4	4 Q	Craig (ENG); L 2–5	Samek (CAN); L 0–5	Arato (AUS); L 1–5	R. Reynolds (WAL); L 5–3	Play stopped as result could not be affected	0	did not advance						

==== Team ====
Athletes	Event	Round 1 pool		Semifinal pool		Final pool			Rank
Athletes	Event	Opposition Result	Opposition Result	Opposition Result	Opposition Result	Opposition Result	Opposition Result	Opposition Result	Rank
Arthur Gatland; Michael Henderson; Richard Peterson; Brian Pickworth	Men's team épée	Hong Kong; W 6–3	—N/a	Wales; W 7–2	—N/a	Canada; L 3–5	Scotland; L 4–5	—N/a	4
Arthur Gatland; Michael Henderson; Richard Peterson; Brian Pickworth	Men's team foil	Hong Kong; W 8–1	—N/a	Scotland; L 2–7	Australia; L 1–5	did not progress			
Michael Henderson; Richard Peterson; Brian Pickworth	Men's team sabre	Hong Kong; W 7–2	—N/a	Australia; L 4–5	Scotland; L 1–5	did not progress			

=== Women ===
==== Individual ====
Foil

Athlete	First round pool						Semifinal pool						Final pool						Rank
Athlete	Opposition Result	Opposition Result	Opposition Result	Opposition Result	Opposition Result	Wins	Opposition Result	Opposition Result	Opposition Result	Opposition Result	Opposition Result	Wins	Opposition Result	Opposition Result	Opposition Result	Opposition Result	Opposition Result	Wins	Rank
Gaye McDermit	Reynolds (WAL); W 4–2	Exelby (AUS); W 4–2	Green (ENG); L 2–4	—N/a		2 Q	Sharfe (NZL); L 1–4	Bain (SCO); L 3–4	Williams (SCO); L 1–4	Barkley (WAL); L 3–4	Green (ENG); W 4–3	1	did not advance						
Rosemary Sharfe	McDougall (AUS); W 4–0	Bain (SCO); L 1–4	Weidel (CAN); W 4–0	Henley (ENG); W 4–3	Brown (WAL); W 4–1	4 Q	McDermit (NZL); W 4–1	Green (ENG); L 1–4	Barkley (WAL); L 1–4	Williams (SCO); L 2–4	Bain (SCO); L 3–4	1	did not advance						
Helen Whitcher	Van Eyk (AUS); W 4–0	Wardell-Yerburgh (ENG); L 0–4	Chatel (CAN); W 4–2	Barkley (WAL); W 4–0	Youngs (SCO); L 1–4	3 Q	Exelby (AUS); L 2–4	Wardell-Yerburgh (ENG); L 0–4	Youngs (SCO); L 1–4	Henley (ENG); L 0–4	Weidel (CAN); W 4–2	1	did not advance						

==== Team ====
Athletes	Event	Semifinal pool		Final pool			Rank
Athletes	Event	Opposition Result	Opposition Result	Opposition Result	Opposition Result	Opposition Result	Rank
Gaye McDermit; Rosemary Sharfe; Helen Whitcher	Women's team foil	Canada; L 3–6	England; L 1–5	did not advance			

== Lawn bowls ==
Athlete	Event	Round robin													Rank
Athlete	Event	Opposition Score	Opposition Score	Opposition Score	Opposition Score	Opposition Score	Opposition Score	Opposition Score	Opposition Score	Opposition Score	Opposition Score	Opposition Score	Opposition Score	Opposition Score	Rank
Phil Skoglund	Men's singles	Woodward (GUE); L 9–21	Bryant (ENG); L 17–21	Kelly (AUS); L 5–21	Motroni (SCO); L 18–21	Fulton (NIR); L 17–21	Ewing (MAW); W 21–19	Liddell (HKG); L 7–21	Bradley (FIJ); L 16–21	Clayton (CAN); L 17–21	Wilkins (WAL); L 20–21	Lapsley (PNG); L 12–21	Bryce (ZAM); L 14–21	Gosden (KEN); W 21–14	12
Bob McDonald; Robbie Robson	Men's pairs	Guernsey; W 19–15	England; L 17–28	Australia; W 22–15	Scotland; W 22–8	Northern Ireland; W 23–11	Malawi; L 14–19	Hong Kong; W 25–10	Fiji; W 22–18	Canada; W 27–12	Wales; W 28–24	Papua New Guinea; W 26–11	Zambia; W 19–14	Kenya; L 24–26	2nd place, silver medalist(s)
Gordon Jolly; Robbie Robson; Percy Jones; Bob McDonald	Men's fours	Guernsey; W 28–8	England; W 23–22	Australia; L 12–26	Scotland; L 15–22	Northern Ireland; W 26–23	Malawi; L 15–20	Hong Kong; L 15–27	Fiji; W 31–13	Canada; L 16–17	Wales; L 13–23	Papua New Guinea; L 13–16	Zambia; L 16–22	Kenya; W 32–12	11

== Swimming ==
Athlete	Event	Heat		Final	
Athlete	Event	Result	Rank	Result	Rank
Barnett Bond	Men's 100 m backstroke	1:06.67	11	did not advance	
Barnett Bond	Men's 200 m backstroke	2:18.91	7 Q	2:20.01	8
Barnett Bond	Men's 200 m individual medley	2:23.30	8 Q	2:23.24	8
Barnett Bond	Men's 400 m individual medley	5:08.40	9	did not advance	
Mike Borrie	Men's 100 m freestyle	54.95	3 Q	54.57	4
Mike Borrie	Men's 200 m freestyle	2:00.94	4 Q	2:00.74	5
Mike Borrie	Men's 400 m freestyle	4:22.11	6 Q	4:20.35	6
Felicity Crawford	Women's 100 m butterfly	1:12.06	12	did not advance	
Felicity Crawford	Women's 100 m freestyle	1:03.94	10	did not advance	
Felicity Crawford	Women's 200 m freestyle	2:20.90	11	did not advance	
Ian Curry	Men's 100 m freestyle	57.15	14	did not advance	
Ian Curry	Men's 200 m freestyle	2:03.95	8 Q	2:02.96	8
Ian Curry	Men's 400 m freestyle	4:20.06	5 Q	4:21.64	7
Susan Hunter	Women's 100 m backstroke	1:14.02	14	did not advance	
Susan Hunter	Women's 200 m backstroke	2:34.73	12	did not advance	
Susan Hunter	Women's 200 m individual medley	2:35.87	7 Q	2:33.30	5
Susan Hunter	Women's 400 m individual medley	5:20.63	2 Q	5:20.10	4
Glenda Stirling	Women's 100 m backstroke	1:08.95	3 Q	1:09.00	4
Glenda Stirling	Women's 200 m backstroke	2:30.50	6 Q	2:29.71	6
Mark Treffers	Men's 200 m freestyle	2:09.31	18	did not advance	
Mark Treffers	Men's 400 m freestyle	4:24.49	9	did not advance	
Mark Treffers	Men's 1500 m freestyle	17:16.54	4 Q	16:44.69	3rd place, bronze medalist(s)
Cathy Whiting	Women's 100 m backstroke	1:12.49	12	did not advance	
Cathy Whiting	Women's 100 m butterfly	1:08.66	1 Q	1:08.71	4
Cathy Whiting	Women's 100 m freestyle	1:03.86	8 Q	1:03.73	7
Cathy Whiting	Women's 200 m freestyle	2:19.43	9	did not advance	
Beth Williams	Women's 100 m breaststroke	1:23.59	12	did not advance	
Beth Williams	Women's 200 m breaststroke	2:56.79	11	did not advance	
Beth Williams	Women's 200 m butterfly	2:38.65	12	did not advance	
Beth Williams	Women's 200 m individual medley	2:37.4	11	did not advance	
Beth Williams	Women's 400 m individual medley	5:34.35	10	did not advance	
Judith Wright	Women's 200 m backstroke	2:30.80	7 Q	2:30.59	7
Judith Wright	Women's 200 m freestyle	2:16.49	5 Q	2:17.54	7
Judith Wright	Women's 400 m freestyle	4:46.55	5 Q	4:54.98	5
Judith Wright	Women's 800 m freestyle	9:49.45	4 Q	9:47.54	4
Judith Wright	Women's 400 m individual medley	5:22.10	3 Q	5:27.12	7
Barnett Bond; Ian Curry; Mark Treffers; Mike Borrie	Men's 4 × 100 m freestyle relay	—N/a		3:47.64	5
Barnett Bond; Ian Curry; Mark Treffers; Mike Borrie	Men's 4 × 200 m freestyle relay	—N/a		8:11.79	4
Barnett Bond; Ian Curry; Mark Treffers; Mike Borrie	Men's 4 × 100 m medley relay	—N/a		4:29.55	6
Felicity Crawford; Judith Wright; Susan Hunter; Cathy Whiting	Women's 4 × 100 m freestyle relay	—N/a		4:15.44	4
Glenda Stirling; Felicity Crawford; Beth Williams; Cathy Whiting	Women's 4 × 100 m medley relay	—N/a		4:44.81	4

== Weightlifting ==
Athlete	Event	Press	Snatch	Jerk	Total	Rank
Bruce Cameron	Lightweight	107.5 kg	105 kg	142.5 kg	355 kg	3rd place, bronze medalist(s)
Tony Ebert	Middleweight	137.5 kg GR	112.5 kg	152.5 kg	402.5 kg	2nd place, silver medalist(s)
John Bolton	Light heavyweight	147.5 kg GR	130 kg	167.5 kg	445 kg	2nd place, silver medalist(s)
John Sherley	Light heavyweight	NVL	DNF			

== Wrestling ==
Athlete	Event	Elimination rounds					Rank
Athlete	Event	Opposition Result	Opposition Result	Opposition Result	Opposition Result	Opposition Result	Rank
Gordon Mackay	Welterweight	O'Brien (AUS); W	Amey (ENG); W	Buchanan (SCO); W	Wurr (CAN); L	Singh (IND); L	3rd place, bronze medalist(s)
David Aspin	Middleweight	Birajdar (IND); L	Grinstead (ENG); D	Schori (CAN); L	Eliminated		3rd place, bronze medalist(s)
Warren Hubber	Heavyweight	Millard (CAN); L	Singh (IND); L	Eliminated			4
Tom Milat	Super heavyweight	Mane (IND); L	Holden (CAN); W	Ilahi (PAK); L	Eliminated		4

== Officials ==
- Team manager – Joe McManemin
- Assistant team manager – Ian Palmer
- Chaperone – E. M. McKenna
- Team doctor – Mayne Smeeton
- Physiotherapist – Stanley Paris
- Athletics
  - Section manager – Barry Kerr
  - Coach – S. Johnson
- Badminton section manager – Roger Dunn
- Boxing section manager – Wally Darrell
- Cycling
  - Section manager – D. B. Smith
  - Coach / mechanic – Warwick Dalton
- Lawn bowls section manager – A. J. McDonald
- Swimming
  - Section manager – Laurie Crabb
  - Coach – Pic Parkhouse
- Weightlifting
  - Section manager – R. E. Hosking
  - Coach – Hugh Morrison
- Wrestling
  - Section manager – Jack McInnes
  - Coach – John Armitt

== See also ==
- New Zealand Olympic Committee
- New Zealand at the Commonwealth Games
- New Zealand at the 1968 Summer Olympics
- New Zealand at the 1972 Summer Olympics
