= Great Britain at the 1972 Summer Olympics =

- Flag of the United Kingdom
- IOC code: GBR
- NOC: British Olympic Association

in Munich
- Competitors: 284 (210 men and 74 women) in 18 sports
- Flag bearers: David Broome (opening); Richard Meade (closing)
- Medals Ranked 12th: Gold 4 Silver 5 Bronze 9 Total 18

Summer Olympics appearances (overview)
- 1896; 1900; 1904; 1908; 1912; 1920; 1924; 1928; 1932; 1936; 1948; 1952; 1956; 1960; 1964; 1968; 1972; 1976; 1980; 1984; 1988; 1992; 1996; 2000; 2004; 2008; 2012; 2016; 2020; 2024

Other related appearances
- 1906 Intercalated Games

Great Britain, represented by the British Olympic Association (BOA), competed at the 1972 Summer Olympics in Munich, West Germany. 284 competitors, 210 men and 74 women, took part in 159 events in 18 sports. British athletes have competed in every Summer Olympic Games.

The Great Britain team included 69-year-old equestrian Lorna Johnstone - the oldest British athlete ever to appear in the Olympic Games.

== Medallists ==
Medals by sport
Sport	Gold medal	Silver medal	Bronze medal	Total
Equestrian	2	1	0	3
Athletics	1	1	2	4
Sailing	1	1	0	2
Judo	0	1	2	3
Swimming	0	1	0	1
Boxing	0	0	3	3
Cycling	0	0	1	1
Shooting	0	0	1	1
Total	4	5	9	18

=== Gold ===
- Mary Peters – Athletics, women's pentathlon
- Richard Meade – Equestrian, three-day event individual competition
- Mary Gordon-Watson, Richard Meade, Bridget Parker, and Mark Phillips – Equestrian, three-day event team competition
- Chris Davies and Rodney Pattisson (Helmsman) – Sailing, Flying Dutchman

=== Silver ===
- David Hemery, David Jenkins, Alan Pascoe, and Martin Reynolds – Athletics, men's 4x400 metres relay
- Ann Moore – Equestrian, jumping individual competition
- David Starbrook – Judo, men's half-heavyweight (93 kg)
- David Wilkie – Swimming, men's 200m breaststroke
- David Hunt and Alan Warren (helmsman) – sailing, Tempest

=== Bronze ===
- Ian Stewart – Athletics, men's 5000 metres
- David Hemery – Athletics, men's 400m hurdles
- Ralph Evans – Boxing, men's light flyweight
- George Turpin – Boxing, men's bantamweight
- Alan Minter – Boxing, men's light middleweight
- Michael Bennett, Ian Hallam, Ronald Keeble, and William Moore – Cycling, men's 4000m team pursuit
- Brian Jacks – Judo, men's middleweight (80 kg)
- Angelo Parisi – Judo, men's open category
- John Kynoch – Shooting, men's running game target

== Archery ==
In the first modern archery competition at the Olympics, Great Britain entered three men and three women. Their highest placing competitor was Lynne Evans, at 16th place in the women's competition.

Men's individual competition:

- Roy Matthews – 2385 points (→ 17th place)
- John Snelling – 2356 points (→ 26th place)
- Ronald Bishop – 2244 points (→ 45th place)

Women's individual competition:

- Lynne Evans – 2313 points (→ 16th place)
- Carol Sykes – 2273 points (→ 21st place)
- Pauline Edwards – 2249 points (→ 25th place)

== Athletics ==
Men's 100 metres

- Brian Green

- Heat, round 1 – 10.41
- Heat, round 2 – 10.58
- Semifinals – 10.52 (→ did not advance)

- Les Piggot

- Heat, round 1 – 10.54
- Heat, round 2 – 10.53 (→ did not advance)

- Don Halliday

- Heat, round 1 – 10.58
- Heat, round 2 – 10.60 (→ did not advance)

Men's 200 metres

- Brian Green

- Heat, round 1 – 21.26
- Heat, round 2 – 21.41 (→ did not advance)

Men's 400 metres

- Martin Reynolds

- Heat, round 1 – 46.46
- Heat, round 2 – 46.11
- Semifinals – 46.71 (→ did not advance)

- David Jenkins

- Heat, round 1 – 46.15
- Heat, round 2 – 45.99
- Semifinals – 45.91 (→ did not advance)

- Gary Armstrong

- Heat, round 1 – 46.48
- Heat, round 2 – 47.10 (→ did not advance)

Men's 800 metres

- Andy Carter

- Heat – 1:47.6
- Semifinals – 1:46.5
- Final – 1:46.6 (→ 6th place)

- Dave Cropper

- Heat – 1:47.5
- Semifinals – 1:48.4 (→ did not advance)

- Colin Campbell

- Heat – 1:54.8 (→ did not advance)

Men's 1500 metres

- Brendan Foster

- Heat – 3:40.8
- Semifinals – 3:38.2
- Final – 3:39.0 (→ 5th place)

- Ray Smedley

- Heat – 3:42.1
- Semifinals – 3:45.8 (→ did not advance)

- John Kirkbride

- Heat – 3:45.3 (→ did not advance)

Men's 5000 metres

- Ian Stewart

- Heat – 13:33.0
- Final – 13:27.6 (→ 3rd place)

- Ian McCafferty

- Heat – 13:38.2
- Final – 13:43.2 (→ 11th place)

- David Bedford

- Heat – 13:49.8
- Final – 13:43.2 (→ 12th place)

Men's 10000 metres

- David Bedford

- Heat – 27:53.6
- Final – 28:05.4(→ 6th place)

- Lachie Stewart

- Heat – 28:31.4 (→ did not advance)

- Dave Holt

- Heat – 28:46.8(→ did not advance)

Men's marathon

- Ron Hill 2:16:30.6 (→ 6th place)
- Donald MacGregor 2:16:34.4 (→ 7th place)
- Colin Kirkham 2:21:54.8 (→ 20th place)

Men's 110m hurdles

- Alan Pascoe

- Heat – 14.08
- Semifinals – 14.24 (→ did not advance)

- Berwyn Price

- Heat – 13.94
- Semifinals – 14.37 (→ did not advance)

- David Wilson

- Heat – 14.31 (→ did not advance)

Men's 400m hurdlles

- David Hemery

- Heat – 49.72
- Semifinals – 49.66
- Final – 48.52 (→ 3rd place)

Men's 3000m steeplechase

- Andy Holden

- Heat – 8:33.8 (→ did not advance)

- Steve Hollings

- Heat – 8:35.0 (→ did not advance)

- John Bicourt

- Heat – 8:38.8 (→ did not advance)

Men's 4 × 100 m relay

- Berwyn Price, Don Halliday, Dave Dear, and Brian Green

- Heat – 39.63

- Les Piggot, Don Halliday, Dave Dear, and Brian Green

- Semifinals – 39.47 (→ did not advance)

Men's 4 × 400 m relay

- Martin Reynolds, Alan Pascoe, David Hemery and David Jenkins

- Semifinals – 3:01.3
- Final – 3:00.5 (→ 2nd place)

Men's long jump

- Alan Lerwill

- Qualification – 7.86
- Final – 7.91 (→ 7th place)

- Lynn Davies

- Qualification – 7.64 (→ did not advance)

Men's pole vault

- Mike Bull

- Qualification – 4.80 (→ did not advance)

Men's shot put

- Geoff Capes

- Qualification – 18.94 (→ did not advance)

Men's discus

- Bill Tancred

- Qualification – 57.24 (→ did not advance)

- John Watts

- Qualification – 53.86 (→ did not advance)

Men's javelin

- Dave Travis

- Qualification – 74.68 (→ did not advance)

Men's hammer throw

- Barry Williams

- Qualification – 66.32
- Final – 68.18 (→ 16th place)

- Howard Payne

- Qualification – 64.56 (→ did not advance)

Men's decathlon

- Barry King 7468 points (→ 15th place)
- Peter Gabbett DNF

Men's 20 km walk

- Paul Nihill 1:28:44.4 (→ 6th place)
- Phil Embleton 1:33:22.2 (→ 14th place)
- Peter Marlow 1:35:38.8 (→ 17th place)

Men's 50 km walk

- Paul Nihill 4:14:09.4 (→ 9th place)
- John Warhurst 4:23:21.6 (→ 18th place)
- Howard Timms 4:34:43.8 (→ 25th place)

Women's 100 metres

- Andrea Lynch

- Heat, round 1 – 11.52
- Heat, round 2 – 11.57
- Semifinals – 11.64(→ did not advance)

- Anita Neil

- Heat, round 1 – 11.55
- Heat, round 2 – 11.58 (→ did not advance)

- Sonia Lannaman

- Heat, round 1 – 11.45
- Heat, round 2 – 11.72 (→ did not advance)

Women's 200 metres

- Donna Murray

- Heat, round 1 – 23.76
- Heat, round 2 – 23.69
- Semifinals – 24.03 (→ did not advance)

- Della Pascoe

- Heat, round 1 – 23.97
- Heat, round 2 – 23.72 (→ did not advance)

- Margaret Critchley

- Heat, round 1 – 24.04
- Heat, round 2 – 24.05 (→ did not advance)

Women's 400 metres

- Jannette Roscoe

- Heat, round 1 – 53.67
- Heat, round 2 – 53.01 (→ did not advance)

- Verona Bernard

- Heat, round 1 – 53.31
- Heat, round 2 – 53.29 (→ did not advance)

- Janet Simpson

- Heat, round 1 – 54.13 (→ did not advance)

Women's 800 metres

- Rosemary Stirling

- Heat – 2:03.6
- Semifinals – 2:02.4
- Final – 2:00.2 (→ 7th place)

- Margaret Coomber

- Heat – 2:03.0 (→ did not advance)

- Patricia Cropper

- Heat – 2:03.6 (→ did not advance)

Women's 1500 metres

- Sheila Carey

- Heat – 4:13.0
- Semifinals – 4:07.4
- Final – 4:04.8 (→ 5th place)

- Joyce Smith

- Heat – 4:11.3
- Semifinals – 4:09.4 (→ did not advance)

- Joan Allison

- Heat – 4:14.9 (→ did not advance)

Women's 100m hurdles

- Judy Vernon

- Heat – 13.37 (→ did not advance)

- Ann Wilson

- Heat – 13.53 (→ did not advance)

== Boxing ==
Men's light flyweight (– 48 kg)

- Ralph Evans → bronze medal

- First round – Salvador García (MEX), 4:1
- Second round – defeated Héctor Velasquez (CHL), 5:0
- Quarterfinals – defeated Chanyalev Haile (ETH), 5:0
- Semifinals – lost to György Gedo (HUN), 5:0

Men's light middleweight (– 71 kg)

- Alan Minter → bronze medal

- First round – bye
- Second round – defeated Reginald Ford (GUY), KO-2
- Third round – defeated Valeri Tregubov (URS), 5:0
- Quarterfinals – defeated Loucif Hanmani (ALG), 4:1
- Semifinals – lost to Dieter Kottysch (FRG), 2:3

== Cycling ==
Eleven cyclists represented Great Britain in 1972.

Individual road race

- Phil Bayton – 5th place
- Phil Edwards – 6th place
- David Lloyd – did not finish (→ no ranking)
- John Clewarth – did not finish (→ no ranking)

Team time trial

- Phil Bayton
- John Clewarth
- Phil Edwards
- David Lloyd

Sprint

- Ernie Crutchlow
- Geoff Cooke

1000m time trial

- Michael Bennett

- Final – 1:09.45 (→ 17th place)

Tandem

- David Rowe and Geoff Cooke → 10th place

Individual pursuit

- Ian Hallam

Individual pursuit

- Mick Bennett
- Ian Hallam
- Ron Keeble
- Willi Moore

== Diving ==
Men's 3m springboard:

- Christopher Walls – 332.07 points (→ 17th place)
- John David Baker – 321.15 points (→ 23rd place)
- Brian Wetheridge – 310.53 points (→ 28th place)

Men's 10m platform:

- Frank Dufficy – 271.77 points (→ 21st place)
- Andrew Michael Gill – 268.68 points (→ 22nd place)
- Brian Wetheridge – 262.59 points (→ 28th place)

Women's 3m springboard:

- Alison Jean Drake – 378.18 points (→ 12th place)
- Helen Mary Koppell – 242.22 points (→ 22nd place)

Women's 10m platform:

- Beverly Williams – 301.26 points (→ 12th place)
- Helen Mary Koppell – 178.17 points (→ 18th place)

== Fencing ==
19 fencers, 14 men and 5 women, represented Great Britain in 1972.

Men's foil

- Barry Paul
- Graham Paul
- Mike Breckin

Men's team foil

- Mike Breckin, Barry Paul, Graham Paul, Anthony Power, Ian Single

Men's épée

- Teddy Bourne
- Ralph Johnson
- Graham Paul

Men's team épée

- Teddy Bourne, Bill Hoskyns, Edward Hudson, Ralph Johnson, Graham Paul

Men's sabre

- Richard Oldcorn
- John Deanfield
- Richard Cohen

Men's team sabre

- David Acfield, Richard Cohen, Rodney Craig, John Deanfield, Richard Oldcorn

Women's foil

- Sue Green
- Janet Wardell-Yerburgh
- Clare Henley

Women's team foil

- Sue Green, Clare Henley, Sally Anne Littlejohns, Janet Wardell-Yerburgh, Susan Wrigglesworth

== Hockey ==
Men's Team Competition

- Preliminary round (group B)

- Defeated Mexico (6-0)
- Lost to India (0-5)
- Lost to New Zealand (1-2)
- Defeated Kenya (2-0)
- Drew with Australia (1-1)
- Defeated the Netherlands (3-1)
- Defeated Poland (2-1)

- Semi-final Round

- Defeated Spain (2-0)

- Classification match

- 5th/6th place: Lost to Australia (1-2) after extra time → 6th place

- Team roster

- Joe Ahmad
- Michael Crowe
- Mike Corby
- Bernie Cotton
- Tony Ekins
- Graham Evans
- John French
- Terry Gregg
- Dennis Hay
- Christopher Langhorne
- Peter Marsh
- Peter Mills
- Richard Oliver
- David Austin Savage
- Keith Sinclair
- Paul Svehlik
- Rui Saldanha

== Modern pentathlon ==
Three male pentathletes represented Great Britain in 1972.

Men's individual competition:

- Jeremy Robert Fox – 5292 points (→ 4th place)
- Barry Lillywhite – 4538 points (→ 36th place)
- Robert Lawson Phelps – 4427 points (→ 47th place)

Men's team competition:

- Fox, Lillywhite, and Phelps – 14257 points (→ 9th place)

Alternate member:

- James Darby

== Rowing ==
Men's single scull

- Kenny Dwan

- Heat – 7:57.49
- Repechage – 8:10.32
- Semi-finals – 8:38.62
- B-final – 8:00.38 (→ 9th place)

Men's double scull

- Tim Crooks, Patrick Delafield

- (→ 5th place)

Men's coxless pair

- Jeremiah McCarthy, Matthew Cooper

- (→ 12th place)

Men's coxed pair

- Michael Hart, David Maxwell, Alan Inns

- Heat – 7:49.56
- Repechage – 8:01.14
- Semi-finals – 8:21.61
- B-final – 7:59.57 (→ 8th place)

Men's coxless four

- Frederick Smallbone, Lenny Robertson, Jim Clark, Bill Mason

- (→ 7th place)

Men's coxed four

- Alan Almand, Christopher Pierce, Rooney Massara, Hugh Matheson, Patrick Sweeney

- (→ 10th place)

== Sailing ==
Flying Dutchman

- Rodney Pattison (Helmsman) and Chris Davies (gold medal)

Tempest

- Alan Warren (Helmsman) and David Hunt (silver medal)

Finn

- Patrick Pym (Helmsman) (12th place)

Dragon

- Simon Tait (Helmsman), Charles Currey and Ian Hannay

Soling

- John Oakley (Helmsman), Barry Dunning and Charles Reynolds (5th place)

Star

- Stuart Jardine (Helmsman) and John Wastall

== Shooting ==
Fourteen male shooters represented Great Britain in 1972. John Kynoch won bronze in the 50 m running target event.

25 m pistol

- John Cooke
- Tony Clark

50 m pistol

- Frank Wyatt
- Harry Cullum

300 m rifle, three positions

- Malcolm Cooper

50 m rifle, three positions

- Malcolm Cooper
- Bob Churchill

50 m rifle, prone

- John Palin
- Phil Lawrence

50 m running target

- John Kynoch
- John Anthony

Trap

- Ronald Carter
- Brian Bailey

Skeet

- Joe Neville
- Colin Sephton

== Swimming ==
Men's 100m freestyle

- Malcolm Windeatt

- Heat – 54.70s (→ did not advance)

- Brian Brinkley

- Heat – 55.06s (→ did not advance)

Men's 200m freestyle

- John Mills

- Heat – 2:00.17 (→ did not advance)

- Brian Brinkley

- Heat – 1:56.99 (→ did not advance)

- Michael Bailey

- Heat – 2:00.79 (→ did not advance)

Men's 4 × 200 m freestyle relay

- Brian Brinkley, John Mills, Michael Bailey, and Colin Cunningham

- Heat – 7:58.33
- Final – 7:55.59 (→ 8th place)
