= Scotland at the 1970 British Commonwealth Games =

- CG code: SCO
- CGA: Commonwealth Games Scotland
- Website: www.teamscotland.scot

in Edinburgh, Scotland
- Medals Ranked 4th: Gold 6 Silver 8 Bronze 11 Total 25

British Commonwealth Games appearances
- 1930; 1934; 1938; 1950; 1954; 1958; 1962; 1966; 1970; 1974; 1978; 1982; 1986; 1990; 1994; 1998; 2002; 2006; 2010; 2014; 2018; 2022; 2026; 2030

Scotland competed at the 1970 British Commonwealth Games in Edinburgh, Scotland, from 16 to 25 July 1970.

Scotland named an initial 61 athletes in their team, before four sports including athletics declared their athletes.

Scotland came 4th overall with 6 golds, 8 silver and 11 bronze medals.

== Medalists ==
=== Gold ===
- Tom Imrie (boxing)
- Sandy Leckie (fencing)
- Rosemary Payne (discus throw)
- Ian Stewart (5,000 metres)
- Lachie Stewart (10,000 metres)
- Rosemary Stirling (800 metres)

=== Silver ===
- Jim Alder (marathon)
- John Gillan (boxing)
- Ian McCafferty (10,000 metres)
- Brian Temple (cycling)
- Men's Sabre Team (fencing)
- Men's Épée Team (fencing)
- Women's Foil Team (fencing)
- Men's fours (Lawn bowls)

=== Bronze ===
- Grant Anderson (wrestling)
- Alex McHugh (boxing)
- Tommy Joyce (boxing)
- John McNiven (weightlifting)
- Stewart Ogilvie (boxing)
- John Rafferty (boxing)
- Bill Sutherland (20 miles walk)
- Don Urquhart (wrestling)
- Moira Walls (high jump)
- David Wilkie (swimming)
- Susan Youngs (fencing)

== Team ==
=== Athletics ===
Men

Athlete	Events	Club	Medals
Jim Alder	marathon		Silver medal
Stuart Hamilton Bell	200m		
David Birkmyre	javelin		
David Bryan-Jones	steeplechase		
Laurie Bryce	hammer		
Crawford Fairbrother	high jump		
Raymond Anthony Paul Gordon	400m		
Ian C. Grant	decathlon		
Don Halliday	100, 200m		
David Jenkins	400m		
David Frederick Kidner	decathlon		
Mike Lindsay	discus, shot put		
Michael John Maclean	800m		
Ian McCafferty	1500, 5000m		Silver medal
Niall McDonald	hammer		
Donald Macgregor	marathon		
Norman Scott Morrison	1500m		
Alan Thomas Murray	110m hurdles		
Alister Fergus Murray	marathon		
Les Piggot	100, 200m		
Hamish Copland Robertson	long jump, triple jump		
Gordon W. Rule	pole vault		
Dave Stevenson	pole vault		
Ian Stewart	5,000m		Gold medal
Lachie Stewart	5000, 10,000m		Gold medal
Peter Stewart	1500m		
Bill Sutherland	20 miles walk	Highgate Harriers	Bronze medal
William Richard Taylor	400m hurdles		
Stuart Harold Tufton	pole vault		
Ian William Turnbull	100m		
David P. Walker	long jump		
Andrew Webb	400m hurdles		
Richard L. Wedlock	10,000m		
David Nicholson Wilson	high jump		
Andrew Jardine Wood	400m		

Women

Athlete	Events	Club	Medals
Avril Beattie	400m		
Wendy Blackwood	discus		
Linda Carruthers	100m hurdles		
Margaret Coomber	1500m		
Georgena Craig	800m		
Lilias Dykes	discus throw	Dunfermline AC	
Helen Hogarth	100, 200m		
Jean Hamilton Jamieson	long jump		
Barbara Lyall	400m		
Maureen McLeish	200m		
Moira Cunningham Niccol	pentathlon		
Rosemary Payne	discus		Gold medal
Patricia M. G. Pennycook	100m		
Christine Price	1500m		
Mary Speedman	800m		
Alix Stevenson	long jump		
Heather McKay Stuart	shot put		
Elizabeth Ann Sutherland	100, 200m		
Moira Walls	high jump, long jump, pentathlon		Bronze medal
Rosemary Wright	800m		Gold medal

=== Badminton ===
Men

Athlete	Events	Club	Medals
Adam Flockhart	singles, mixed	Newmills, Fife	
Fraser Gow	singles, doubles, mixed	Alexandria, Dunfermline	
Ian Hume	doubles	Glasgow	
Bob McCoig	singles, doubles, mixed	Perrivale BC, Middlesex	
Jim McNeillage	singles, doubles, mixed	Edinburgh	

Women

Athlete	Events	Club	Medals
Christine Evans	mixed	Whitburn	
Joanna Flockhart	singles, doubles, mixed	Newmills, Fife	
Maureen Hume	singles, doubles, mixed	Glasgow	
Helen Kelly	singles, doubles, mixed	Union & Exiles BC, Aberdeen	
Mary Thompson	singles, doubles	Glasgow	

=== Boxing ===
Athlete	Events	Club	Medals
Ian Cameron	57kg featherweight	Larkfield ABC	
John Gillan	60kg lightweight	Aberdeen ABC	Silver medal
Jim Gilmour	91kg heavyweight	Sighthill ABC	
Peter Harrison	63.5kg light-welterweight	Glasgow Transport ABC	
Mike Imrie	75kg middleweight	Buccleuch ABC, Edinburgh	
Tom Imrie	71kg Light-middleweight	Buccleuch ABC, Edinburgh	Gold medal
Tommy Joyce	67kg Welterweight	Doncaster Plant Works ABC	Bronze medal
Tony Kerr	-48kg light-flyweight	Aberdeen ABC	
Alex McHugh	51kg flyweight	Kelvin ABC, Glasgow	Bronze medal
Stewart Ogilvie	54kg bantamweight	Camperdown ABC, Dundee	Bronze medal
John Rafferty	81kg light-heavyweight	Clarkston ABC, Airdrie	Bronze medal

=== Cycling ===
Athlete	Events	Club	Medal
Thomas Banks	sprint, time trial		
Billy Bilsland	road race		
Andrew Brunton	road race		
John Clark	scratch, pursuit		
Alex Gilchrist	road race		
Alex Gordon	scratch, time trial		
Andy McGhee	road race		
Philip Spiers	sprint		
Brian Temple	scratch, time trial, pursuit		Silver medal
Kenneth Whitson	sprint		

=== Diving ===
Men

Athlete	Events	Club	Medals
Maurice Campbell	springboard, platform		

Women

Athlete	Events	Club	Medals
Jennifer Emery	platform		
Katherine Ingram	springboard, platform		
Ann McCarroll	springboard		

=== Fencing ===
Men

Athlete	Events	Club	Medals
Ian Hunter	épée, épée team	SFC, Edinburgh	Silver medal
Sandy Leckie	sabre, sabre team	London Fencing Club	,
Tony Mitchell	sabre, sabre team	Glasgow Fencing Club	Silver medal
Norman H. Rouxel	épée	SFC, Edinburgh	
Derek Russell	épée, épée team, foil	SFC, Edinburgh	Silver medal
George Sandor	épée, épée team, foil	SFC, Edinburgh	Silver medal
Lewis M. Smith	foil	Heriot-Watt University	
Gordon Wiles	sabre, sabre team	Leicester YMCA	Silver medal

Women

Athlete	Events	Club	Medals
Judith Bain	foil, foil team	Glasgow Fencing Club	Silver medal
Barbara Williams	foil, foil team	Glasgow Fencing Club	Silver medal
Susan Youngs	foil, foil team	Dunfermline CPE	,

=== Lawn bowls ===
Athlete	Events	Club	Medals
Alex Henderson	pairs	Craigentinny BC	
Alex McIntosh	fours/rinks	Newbattle BC	Silver medal
Bob Motroni	singles	Dumfries BC	
David Pearson	fours/rinks	Newbattle BC	Silver medal
Norman Pryde	fours/rinks	Newbattle BC	Silver medal
Bill Scott	pairs	Craigentinny BC	
John Slight	fours/rinks	Newbattle BC	Silver medal

=== Swimming ===
Men

Athlete	Events	Club	Medals
Downie Brown	100m Freestyle	Paisley	
Alex Galletly	200, 400m medley	Perth Pullars	
Eric Henderson	100, 200m butterfly	Warrender	
Alastair MacGregor	100, 200, 400m freestyle	Warrender	
John McClatchey	100, 200m backstroke, 400 freestyle	Perth Pullars	
Martin Shore	100, 200m freestyle	Inverness	
Hamilton Simpson	100, 200m backstroke, 200 medley	Paisley	
Gordon Souter	200, 400m freestyle	Kirkintilloch	
Gordon G. Stirton	100, 200m breaststroke	Warrender	
David Wilkie	100, 200m breaststroke, 200 medley	Warrender	Bronze medal
Archibald Young	100m breaststroke	Glasgow Univ	

Women

Athlete	Events	Club	Medals
Linda Armour	100, 200m backstroke, 200 medley	Warrender	
A Blyth	200m breaststroke		
Heather Blyth	100, 200m butterfly	Dumfries	
Moira Brown	100, 200m butterfly, 100m Freestyle	Dumfries	
Margaret Fenton	100, 200m backstroke, 100m Freestyle		
Carol Flynn	100, 200m freestyle	Warrender	
Sally Hogg	200m butterfly, 400, 800 freestyle	Warrender	
Andrea Mackie	200, 400, 800m freestyle	Thistle Ladies	
Jean Ross	100, 200m backstroke	Motherwell	
Kathleen Stewart	100m breaststroke	Warrender	
Diane Walker	100, 200m breaststroke, 200, 400 medley	Thistle Ladies	
Pamela Wilson	100, 200m breaststroke, 200 medley	Warrender	

=== Weightlifting ===
Athlete	Events	Medals
Grant Anderson	+110kg super-heavyweight	Bronze medal
George Byng	75kg middleweight	
Phil Caira	82.5kg light-heavyweight	
Derek Gillies	90kg middle-heavyweight	
Jack Hynd	110kg heavyweight	
N. McLeod	82.5kg light-heavyweight	
John McNiven	52kg flyweight	Bronze medal
E. Parkes	75kg middleweight	
Charlie Revolta	52kg flyweight	

=== Wrestling ===
Athlete	Events	Club	Medals
Tam Anderson	68kg lghtweight	Milngavie	
Wallace Booth	100kg heavyweight	Milton WC, Edinburgh	
Finlay Buchanan	74kg welterweight	Glasgow	
Robert Grant	57kg bantamweight		
Alastair McNeill	90kg light-heavyweight	Dunfermline	
John McCourtney	62kg featherweight	Milngavie 41 Club	
Ronnie Mitchell	82kg middleweight	Alloa	
David Simpson	52kg flyweight	Bo'ness	
Don Urquhart	48kg light-flyweight	Duntocher	Bronze medal
