= Barbara James =

Barbara James may refer to:

- Barbara James (writer) (1943–2003), Australian author, historian, journalist, political adviser and activist
- Barbara James (discus thrower) (1942–2012), British athlete
- Barbara James (musician) (1908–2004), Australian jazz vocalist
- Barbara Straker James (1918–2007), American artist
