= Bentleigh Secondary College =

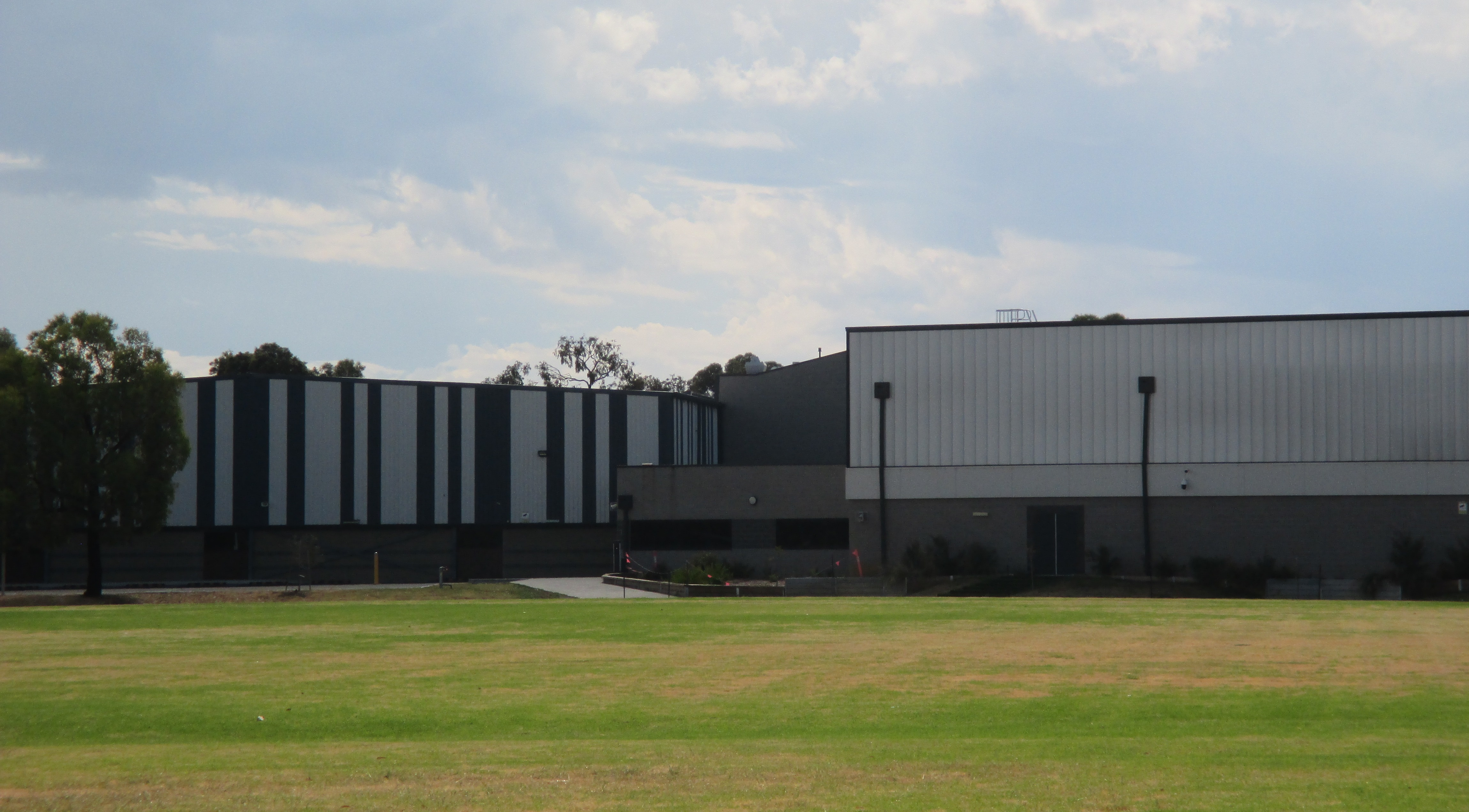
- Bentleigh College 2023
- Bentleigh East, Victoria; Australia

Information
- Type: Public school
- Motto: Optimum Esse Vos Esse (Be the Best You Can Be)
- Established: 1956
- Principal: Helene Hiotis
- Grades: 7–12
- Colours: Blue & maroon
- Website: bentleighsc.vic.edu.au

Bentleigh Secondary College is a coeducational public high school in Bentleigh East, Victoria, Australia. Established in 1956, it has been renamed several times before becoming Bentleigh Secondary College.

Bentleigh Secondary College has been through major modernisation since 2019-2024. The first being in 2019, where a state of the art STEAM was built (Da Vinci Building) which included, new science, textiles, woodtech, IT, art and economics rooms. They also built, a two court basketball stadium and weights room. In 2024 a new performing arts centre was built, which includes a theatre, dance room, six instrumental rooms and three drama rooms

== History ==
In 1956, around 200 secondary students of the Bentleigh area assembled at the grandstand of Bentleigh Football Club to be become a part of the new Bentleigh High, with the school to be located on Vivien Street. The first headmaster Mr L.A Cooke, opening words were “Buildings do not make a school, but the students and the teachers make a school.” which inspired the school's first motto, “Schools are not made of buildings.” During the day, Mr L.A Cooke would also state to parents and pupil's "We've got everything except one thing. Do you know what it is?" The audience would shout in response "A school!"

In 1984 Bentleigh High would combine with Moorabbin Technical School to form Moorabbin City Technical High School. Only 3 years later in 1987 the school would change this name into Moorabbin City Secondary College.

By 1996 changes to local council boundaries meant Bentleigh was now a part of Glen Eira, by 1997 the school council would agree to change the name to Bentleigh Secondary College with a new logo and uniform. Since Bentleigh High School was founded, a school with links to current-day Bentleigh Secondary College has always existed on the Vivien Street site.

== Campus ==
The college is made up of various different 'blocks' and buildings:

=== Administration Block ===
The Administration Block was built in stage one of the college's building program. It consists of the college's main office, senior staff offices, a conference room, two interview rooms, the general staff room and the sick bay.

=== Performing Arts Precinct ===
The Performing Arts Centre was demolished in May 2023, and soon was rebuilt as the Performing Art Precinct (PAP), opening in December 2024. It has 500 seats capacity, and took $13.2 million to build

=== Sports Precinct ===
The Sports Stadiums, is made up of main stadiums (the 'old' stadium and the 'new' stadium). Both, boasts two sports courts and changerooms. In between the two stadiums is the home of the school gym. The stadiums are heavily utilised by sports and PE classes, the stadium is also rented to the community, and sports organizations such as basketball teams are based there.

The Wetlands Classrooms are located near the 'new stadium', and contain four portable classrooms used primarily for Health and PE classes.

=== VCE Centre ===
The VCE Centre was converted from the former library. It has an open plan style with teachers' desks at the center, several classrooms, and generous study space. It is used by students, particularly those in year 12, undertaking VCE studies. this also contains the lockers of the year 12 students.

=== Learning Centre ===
The Learning Centre was completed under stage two of the college's building program and incorporates the college library, science rooms and 4 general classrooms. This is home to one house locker, and out of the back of the center are the wetlands lockers, used by the losing house of the cup.

=== da Vinci STEAM Centre ===
The Da Vinci Centre was completed in 2017 and holds most of the school's elective classrooms, as well as a few science labs and normal classrooms, this building is home to the first and second winning houses of the cup.

=== Year 7 Precinct (A block) ===
The A Block is located next to the performing arts center, and holds 16 general classrooms, in between a couple of the portables is the Year 7 precinct, where during snack and lunch no other year level is allowed to hang out.

The college grounds also include a sustainable garden, a football oval, 2 soccer pitches, a meditation center and a complete wetlands area.

=== Campus student enrollment count ===
Bentleigh Secondary college has an official enrolment of 936 students in 2026, 535 boys and 401 girls, along with approximately 95 teaching staff members.

== LOTE ==
The college offers both French and Japanese as languages. Studying a language is compulsory for all students in year 7-9. Thereafter, it is offered as an elective, and both are available to students as VCE subjects taught on-campus.

== Gifted and Talented Program ==
The college has implemented a Gifted and Talented Program for high-achieving students in years 7-9. Entry in the program is determined via performance on a test sat in grade 6, whilst high-performing students may be recommended to join the program after year 7. Since 2022, the program has consisted of two classes, designated as homegroups number 1 and 4 in each cohort. All members of the Gifted and Talented Program are also enrolled in the college's Music Program.

== Performing arts ==
=== Instrument ===
The college offers tuition on a wide range of instruments, including brass, woodwind, strings and percussion. Students enrolled in the music program attend a 30-minute class each week, and are also expected to participate in at least one band or ensemble. Bands and ensembles at the college include:

- Junior strings
- Senior strings
- Year 7 band
- Intermediate (8-9) concert band
- Senior concert band
- Jazz combo
- ContraBAND (Senior rock)
- BANDwagon (Junior rock)
- Choir

The college also offers classroom music as an elective, and also teaches both VCE Music Repertoire and Music Contemporary.Membership has increased significantly in the 2020s. In 2021, participation in the music program became mandatory for all Gifted and Talented students from years 7-9, whilst the expansion of the Gifted and Talented program to two classes in 2022 further increased membership.

=== Drama and Dance ===
The college offers drama as an elective, and also teaches VCE Theart. Dance is not offered as a subject, but is offered as a whole year sport elective, meaning Year 7s and 8s can participate in dance across all four terms. Students may also choose to study VET Dance as part of their VCE.

=== Key events ===
==== Productions ====
Typically, in late term 2, the whole school musical is an annual event which is performed across multiple nights to the college and wider community. In past years a senior school play would also be held, with many of the years including original plays. An International Women's Day production is also held every year.

2008 - 2025 Bentleigh Secondary College Productions
Year	Musical	Notes	Cast
2025	Mamma Mia	First musical held in the new Preformence Arts Precinct	Whole School
2024	Freaky Friday	Held off campus due to the construction of the Preformence Arts Precinct	Whole School
2023	Home Before Midnight	Held off campus due to the construction of the Preformence Arts Precinct	Whole School
2023	Home Before Midnight	Invented by the school	Senior School
2022	NA	Cancelled due to covid	NA
2021	The Adventure Girls	International Women's Day	Whole School (Female Cast)
2021	NA	Cancelled due to covid	
2020	Letter To My Younger Self	International Women's Day	Whole School (Female Cast)
2020	NA	Cancelled due to covid	
2019	The Wedding Singer		Whole School
2018	Flight Risk	Invented by the school	Senior School
2018	We Will Rock You		Whole School
2017	The Queen	Invented by the school	Senior school
2017	Grease		Whole School
2016	With These Eyes	Invented by the school	Senior school
2016	Seussical The Musical		Whole School
2015	Pippin		Whole School
2015	The Waiting Room		Senior School
2014	Forget Me Not	Invented by the school	Senior School
2014	Aida		Whole School
2013	All shook up		Whole School
2013	Midsummer night dream		Senior School
2012	Beauty And the beast		Whole School
2012	Two Weeks With The Queen		Senior School
2011	Chicago		Whole School
2010	Footloose		Whole School
2009	The Truth		Whole School
2008	Anne		Whole School

==== MADD (Music, Art, Dance, Drama) ====
Established in 2022, the MADD night is a large scale annual event showcasing student talent across the performing arts. All bands and ensembles perform, whilst there are also many individual and group dance and drama performances. The MADD night also includes an art display, showcasing student studio art, graphic design, media, woodwork and textile works. The MADD night is usually held in early term 3, and has been held in the Performing Arts Precinct since 2025.

== Student Leadership ==
The college offers a variety of leadership opportunities for students. This includes the following:

- Two College Captains and two Deputy College Captains (Year 12). The four Year 12 College Captains serve on the School Council, alongside two other student representatives who are elected for a two-year term.
- Two Middle School Captains and Two Middle School Deputy Captains (Year 9)
- The Student Representative Council (SRC) is composed of four students from each year level. The Middle School and College Captains double as their cohort’s SRC representatives.
- Each house (Fawkner, Wickham, Dendy and Hawker) has two captains from each year level (8-12)
- Two Year 12 captains are also appointed for each of: Music, Drama and Sport
- One senior (Year 12) and Middle School (Year 9) captain are appointed for the following roles: Respect, Debating and Sustainability/STEAM. The college also appoints a Year 12 International Student Captain.
- Each year, a number of Year 10 students volunteer as Peer Support mentors, and are involved in the Year 7 orientation day and are heavily present during their first few weeks of school.

== Clubs ==
- Breakfast Club (Runs in the mornings every Tuesday and Thursday)
- Debating Club (Debating Club hosts the House Debating program in Term 2)
- Dnd Club
- French Clubs
- Green Machine (Sustainability and STEAM club)
- Japanese Club
- Lego Club
- Maths Club (Afterschool maths study)
- STEAM Club
- Tech Club
- History Mysteries Club
- Book Club
- Textiles Club
- Respect Club

== Alumni ==
- Steph Catley - Australian Soccer Player
- Marion Exelby - Australian Olympic Fencer
- Greg Benko- Australian Olympic Fencer
- Neville Stone - VFL footballer
- Greg Wells - VFL footballer
- Laurie Peckham - Olympic High Jumper
- Alana Porter - AFL footballer
- Sarah Hartwig - AFL footballer
- Luke Nankervis - AFL footballer

== Incidents and Controversy ==
=== Fire incident ===
At approximately 3:00 am on 10 February 2008, two police officers saw smoke coming from the school and a car leaving this area. The fire caused more than $100,000 in damage, however the decision of the officers to proceed to the cause of the smoke rather than pursue the culprits prevented further destruction.

=== Bomb threat ===
During 2016 Bentleigh Secondary College was one of the many targeted schools, in the 2016 Australian School Bomb Threat, over a thousand people were evacuated from the school shortly after 9am.

=== Braided hair controversy ===
In March 2017, two sisters who attend the college were ordered to remove their hair braids or face consequences by school staff. The sisters, of South Sudanese descent, stated that the braids were the healthiest and best way to manage their hair and refused to remove them. The sisters accused the school of discrimination. Media coverage and public backlash resulted from the incident due to the school's perceived lack of racial sensitivity and understanding.
