= Edward Hudson =

Edward Hudson may refer to:

- Edward Hudson (dentist) (1743–1821), Irish dentist
- Edward Hudson (fencer) (born 1946), British Olympic fencer
- Edward Hudson (footballer) (1887–1945), English footballer
- Edward Hudson (magazine owner) (1854–1936), founder of Country Life magazine and owner of Lindisfarne Castle
- Edward Hudson (priest) (1791–1851), Irish priest

== See also ==
- Edward Hutson (1871–1936), Anglican Bishop of Antigua and Archbishop of the West Indies
- Edward Hodson (1964), English cricketer
