= Lawn bowls at the 1970 British Commonwealth Games =

- Venue: Balgreen Bowling Club
- Location: Edinburgh, Scotland
- Dates: 16–25 July 1970

Lawn bowls at the 1970 British Commonwealth Games was the eighth appearance of the Lawn bowls at the Commonwealth Games. Competition at the 1970 British Commonwealth Games took place in Edinburgh, Scotland, from 16–25 July 1970. Lawn bowls returned to the Commonwealth Games following the exclusion of the event in the 1966 British Empire and Commonwealth Games because Jamaica had insufficient bowling greens.

The events were held at the Balgreen Bowling Club with temporary seating being added during the nine days of competition.

England topped the medal table by winning two gold medals.

== Medal table ==
* Host nation (Scotland)

Medal table, by nation
Rank	Nation	Gold	Silver	Bronze	Total
1	England	2	0	0	2
2	Hong Kong	1	0	0	1
3	New Zealand	0	1	0	1
3	Scotland*	0	1	0	1
3	Zambia	0	1	0	1
6	Northern Ireland	0	0	3	3
Totals (6 entries)		3	3	3	9

== Medallists ==
Medal winners, by event
Event	Gold	Silver	Bronze
Men's singles	(England); David Bryant	(Zambia); Neal Bryce	(Northern Ireland); Roy Fulton
Men's pairs	(England); Norman King, Peter Line	(New Zealand); Bob McDonald, Robbie Robson	(Northern Ireland); Jimmy Donnelly, Syd Thompson
Men's fours	(Hong Kong); Abdul Kitchell, Saco Delgado, George Souza Sr., Roberto da Silva	(Scotland); Alex McIntosh, David Pearson, John Slight, Norman Pryde	(Northern Ireland); Edward Gordon, Harold Stevenson, John Higgins, William Tate

== Results ==
=== Men's singles – round-robin ===
Men's singles, round-robin results
Pos	Player	P	W	L	Pts	Shots
1st place, gold medalist(s)	(England) David Bryant	13	12	1	24	+128
2nd place, silver medalist(s)	(Zambia) Neal Bryce	13	9	4	18	+49
3rd place, bronze medalist(s)	(Northern Ireland) Roy Fulton	13	9	4	18	+36
4	(Australia) Geoff Kelly	13	8	5	16	+49
5	(Scotland) Bob Motroni	13	8	5	16	+20
6	(Hong Kong) Eric Liddell	13	8	5	16	0
7	(Kenya) Denis Gosden	13	7	6	14	+17
8	(Wales) Dai Wilkins	13	7	6	14	-12
9	(Fiji) J Bradley	13	7	6	14	-31
10	(Papua New Guinea) Tony Lapsley	13	6	7	12	-1
11	(Guernsey) Charlie Woodhard	13	5	8	10	-53
12	(New Zealand) Phil Skoglund	13	2	11	4	-67
13	(Canada) Harold Clayton	13	2	11	4	-69
14	(Malawi) Bob Ewing	13	1	12	2	-66

=== Men's pairs – round robin ===
Men's pairs round-robin result
Pos	Player	P	W	D	L	Pts	Shots
1st place, gold medalist(s)	(England) Norman King & Peter Line	13	12	0	1	24	+80
2nd place, silver medalist(s)	(New Zealand) Bob McDonald & Robbie Robson	13	10	0	3	20	+17
3rd place, bronze medalist(s)	(Northern Ireland) Jimmy Donnelly & Syd Thompson	13	9	1	3	19	+83
4	(Scotland) Alex Henderson & Bill Scott	13	7	3	3	17	+26
5	(Malawi) Charles Slight & Stuart Flanders	13	8	0	5	16	+8
6	(Kenya) C Pilgrim & Harry Smith	13	6	2	5	14	-18
7	(Canada) Harry Elliott & John Henderson	13	6	1	6	13	+8
8	(Australia) Alan Schulte & Thomas Holden	13	6	0	8	12	-7
9	(Hong Kong) Augusto Pedro Pereira & Osman Adem	13	5	1	7	11	-19
10	(Fiji) P Smith & Peter Underhill	13	4	1	8	9	-32
11	(Papua New Guinea) Alan Ramsbottom & Jack Spears	13	4	1	8	9	-51
12	(Wales) Gwyn Howells & Leighton Jenkins	13	4	0	9	8	-25
13	(Guernsey) Donald Ingrouille & Norman Le Ber	13	3	0	10	6	-52
14	(Zambia) A Kay & C Harvey	13	2	0	11	4	-78

=== Men's rinks (fours) – round robin ===
Men's fours round-robin results
Pos	Player	P	W	D	L	Pts	Shots
1st place, gold medalist(s)	(Hong Kong) Abdul Kitchell, Saco Delgado, George Souza Sr., Roberto da Silva	13	11	1	1	23	+128
2nd place, silver medalist(s)	(Scotland) Alex McIntosh, David Pearson, John Slight, Norman Pryde	13	9	0	4	18	+25
3rd place, bronze medalist(s)	(Northern Ireland) Edward Gordon, Harold Stevenson, John Higgins, William Tate	13	8	1	4	17	+81
4	(Zambia) A Haythorne, D Coetzee, F Hynd, H Ellis	13	7	1	5	15	+21
5	(Wales) Aeron John, Harry Thompson, Roy Jones, Bill Pattimore	13	7	0	6	14	-12
6	(Canada) Ted Hodgson, Sam Caffyn, James Denholm, Tom Jarvis	13	7	0	6	14	0
7	(Australia) David Hamblen, Frank Harrison, John Dobbie, Reginald Purcell	13	6	1	6	13	+28
8	(England) Cliff Stroud, Harry Powell, Norman Hook, Bobby Stenhouse	13	6	1	6	13	+15
9	(Papua New Guinea) Barrie Baxter, M Brix, Oswald Dent, P Allum	13	6	0	7	12	+4
10	(Kenya) A Graham, B Scott, C Pilgrim, L Yeomanson	13	5	1	7	11	-62
11	(New Zealand) Gordon Jolly, Robbie Robson, Percy Jones, Bob McDonald	13	5	0	8	10	+2
12	(Guernsey) Cyril Smith, E La Cras, George Hollings, W Hobbs	13	4	0	9	8	-66
13	(Fiji) F Moffett, J Whyman, Peter Oates, V Costello	13	4	0	9	8	-98
14	(Malawi) Alastair Davidson, Alexander 'Sandy' Ross, Henry Lakin, Jack Patterson	13	3	0	10	6	-90

== See also ==
- List of Commonwealth Games medallists in lawn bowls
- Lawn bowls at the Commonwealth Games
