= Edward Gordon (bowls) =

Irish international lawn bowler

Personal information
- Nationality: British (Northern Irish)
- Born: 6 March 1912 Belfast, Northern Ireland
- Died: 22 June 1992 (aged 80) Belfast, Northern Ireland
- Occupation: Lecturer

Sport
- Sport: Lawn bowls
- Club: Falls BC
Medal record
Representing Northern Ireland
Commonwealth Games
Bronze medal – third place	1970 Edinburgh	fours

Edward Joseph Gordon (6 March 1912 – 22 June 1992) was an Irish international lawn bowler who competed at the Commonwealth Games.

== Biography ==
Gordon was a member of the Falls Bowls Club.

He represented the Northern Irish team at the 1970 British Commonwealth Games in Edinburgh. He participated in the fours event with Harold Stevenson, John Higgins and Billy Tate, winning a bronze medal.

Representing Ireland both indoor and outdoor over 50 times, he won 7 Irish Senior Cup medals, 7 Private Greens senior league medals, 8 Private Greens senior cups with Falls BC.

With Brendan McBrien he played lead when winning the British Isles Indoors Pairs Championship in 1970 and played third to McBrien's four during the 1974 British Isles indoor championsip win. He was a Past President of the Private Greens Bowling League and the Irish Bowling Association.
