= Northern Ireland at the 1970 British Commonwealth Games =

- CGF code: NIR
- CGA: Northern Ireland Commonwealth Games Council
- Website: nicgc.org

in Edinburgh, Scotland
- Flag bearers: Opening:Morris Foster; Closing:
- Medals Ranked 10th: Gold 3 Silver 1 Bronze 5 Total 9

British Commonwealth Games appearances
- 1934; 1938; 1950; 1954; 1958; 1962; 1966; 1970; 1974; 1978; 1982; 1986; 1990; 1994; 1998; 2002; 2006; 2010; 2014; 2018; 2022; 2026; 2030

Other related appearances
- Ireland (1930)

Northern Ireland competed at the 1970 British Commonwealth Games in Edinburgh, Scotland, from 16 to 25 July 1970.

Northern Ireland finished 10th in the medal table with three gold medals, one silver medal and five bronze medals.

The Northern Irish team of 72 athletes and officials were named during June 1970, which was the largest contingent to date for a Northern Irish team.

== Medalists ==
=== Gold ===
- Mike Bull (pole vault)
- Mary Peters (shot put)
- Mary Peters (pentathlon)

=== Silver ===
- John McKinty (boxing)

=== Bronze ===
- Paddy Doherty (boxing)
- Roy Fulton (lawn bowls)
- Davy Larmour (boxing)
- Men's pairs (lawn bowls)
- Men's fours/rinks (lawn bowls)

== Team ==
=== Officials ===
- Dick McColgan - General team amanager
- Derek Murray - Assistant team amanager
- Wilson Johnston - Doctor
- Mrs M. E. Hopkins - Chaperone
- W. Mackey - Athletics manager
- Sean Kyle - Athletics coach
- G. Devlin - Boxing coach
- W. Agnew - Boxing coach
- Bob Thompson - Lawn bowls manager
- T. Taylor - Cycling manager/mechanic
- F. Bradley - Swimming coach
- Syd Harvey - Weightlifting coach/manager

=== Athletics ===
Men

Athlete	Events	Club	Medals
Mike Bull	pole vault, 4 × 100 m		Gold medal
Gerard M. Carson	100, 400m, 4 × 100 m		
Joseph Chivers	200, 400m, 4 × 100 m		
Martin Cranny	marathon		
Derek Graham	5000, 10,000m		
John H. G. Kinahan	110, 400m hurdles		
Johnny Kilpatrick	100m, 4 × 100 m		
Charles James Kirkpatrick	110m hurdles		
David N. Logue	steeplechase		
Dave J. R. A. Smyth	20 mile walk		
Mike Teer	marathon		

Women

Athlete	Events	Club	Medals
Maeve Kyle	400m, 4 × 100 m		
Noeline McGarvey	100, 200m, 4 × 100 m		
Mary Peters	100m hurdles, pentathlon, shot put		,
Gay Porter	discus, javelin, shot put		
Adrienne Alexandra Smyth	100, 800m, 4 × 100 m		
Linda Teskey	100, 200m, 4 × 100 m		

=== Badminton ===
Men

Athlete	Events	Club	Medals
Sammy Blair	doubles, mixed	Ballymacarrett BC	
John McCloy	singles, doubles, mixed	Ulster Racquets Club	
Peter Moore	singles, doubles	Ballymacarrett BC	
Winston Wilkinson	singles, doubles, mixed	Ballymacarrett BC	

Women

Athlete	Events	Club	Medals
Joan McCloy	singles, doubles	Ulster Racquets Club	
Maureen Mockford	singles, doubles, mixed	Malone	

=== Boxing ===
Athlete	Events	Club	Medals
Paul N. Carson	60kg ightweight		
Paddy Doherty	71kg light-middlweight	Ballyshannon ABC	Bronze medal
Robert G. Espie	81kg middlweight		
Gerald M. Jordan	57kg featherweight		
Davy Larmour	51kg flyweight		Bronze medal
Frank McCormick	75kg middleweight		
John McKinty	91kg heavyweight	British Army BC	Silver medal
John Rodgers	67kg welterweight		
Mickey P. Tohill	54kg bantamweight		

=== Cycling ===
Athlete	Events	Club	Medals
David Beattie	sprint, time trial		
Morris Foster	pursuit		
Noel Gallagher	time trial		
Ronnie Grant	scratch, sprint, time trial		
Dave Kane	road race, pursuit		

=== Fencing ===
Athlete	Events	Club	Medals
W. Richard J. Gray	foil, épée, sabre, team x 2		
W. Jim MacGill	foil, épée, sabre, team x 2		
William D. Richardson	foil, épée, sabre, team x 2		

=== Lawn bowls ===
Athlete	Events	Club	Medals
Jimmy Donnelly	pairs	Falls BC	Bronze medal
Roy Fulton	singles	Coleraine BC	Bronze medal
Edward Gordon	fours/rinks	Falls BC	Bronze medal
John Higgins	fours/rinks	York Road Civil Defence BC	Bronze medal
Harold Stevenson	fours/rinks	Donaghadee BC	Bronze medal
William Tate	fours/rinks	Bangor BC	Bronze medal
Syd Thompson	pairs	Willowfield BC	Bronze medal

=== Swimming ===
Men

Athlete	Events	Club	Medals
Liam Ball	100, 200m breaststroke		
Thomas D. Irvine	200, 400m medley		
Cecil D. G. Russell	100, 200m breaststroke		

Women

Athlete	Events	Club	Medals
Norma A. Stobo	100, 200m backstroke		
Heather Withers	100m breaststroke		

=== Weightlifting ===
Athlete	Events	Club	Medals
Billy Lyttle	90kg middle-heavyweight		
Alex McAfee	90kg middle-heavyweight		
Dave Pattison	110kg heavyweight		
Paul Ross	67.5kg lightweight		
