= Poppy Cooksey =

British fencer (born 1940)

Poppy, Lady Cooksey OBE DL
Personal information
- Born: 15 February 1940 (age 86) Gomshall, Surrey, England

Sport
- Sport: Fencing
- Event: foil
- Club: Polytechnic Fencing Club
Medal record
Fencing
Representing England
British Empire & Commonwealth Games
Gold medal – first place	1966 Kingston	team foil
Gold medal – first place	1966 Kingston	individual foil
Gold medal – first place	1970 Edinburgh	team foil
Gold medal – first place	1970 Edinburgh	individual foil

Janet Clouston Bewley, Lady Cooksey OBE DL, (known as Poppy Cooksey, previously Janet Wardell-Yerburgh, née Janet Cathie) (born 15 February 1940) is a British fencer whose later career was in picture restoration.

She married firstly the Olympic oarsman Hugh Wardell-Yerburgh and secondly the business man Sir David Cooksey. In 1998 she was appointed as a Deputy Lieutenant of Hampshire.

== Early life ==
Cooksey was born in 1940, the elder daughter of Ian Aysgarth Bewley Cathie MD, of Barton House, Barton-on-the-Heath, Warwickshire, and his wife Dr Marian Josephine Cunning. Her father was lord of the manor of Barton-on-the-Heath. Although christened as Janet, she is known by the name Poppy.

Educated at Cheltenham Ladies' College and London University, where she graduated B. Sc., she then trained as an accountant. From the age of sixteen, she was a competitive fencer.

== Fencing career ==
Cooksey pursued her sport at the Polytechnic Fencing Club, London, which also produced Mary Glen-Haig, Sue Green, and Richard Cohen. She competed in the women's individual and team foil events at the 1964, 1968 and 1972 Summer Olympics.

As Janet Wardell-Yerburgh, she represented England and won double gold in the foil events at the 1966 British Empire and Commonwealth Games in Kingston, Jamaica. She repeated the success by winning another double gold at the 1970 British Commonwealth Games in Edinburgh, Scotland.

As Poppy Cooksey, she has continued to compete and holds veteran titles.

== Later career ==
Poppy Cooksey graduated as a doctor of philosophy in Fine Arts from the University of St Andrews, and her thesis on the life and work of the Scottish painter Alexander Nasmyth was published in 1990. She then trained to become a picture restorer and established her own restoration business in London.

As a volunteer, she organized fund-raising events for the Royal National Lifeboat Institution and others for the building of a hospice for terminally sick children. In 1998, she was appointed by Mary Fagan, the Lord Lieutenant of Hampshire, as one of her Deputy Lieutenants, and in 2000 was made a Freeman of the City of London. In the 2004 New Year Honours, she was appointed an OBE for services to fencing. In 2004, as a retirement project, she set up a bed and breakfast at Uplands House, Banbury, in the Cotswolds.

In 2015, Cooksey was Master of the Guild of Freemen of the City of London, to be succeeded by Sir David Wootton.

== Personal life ==
In 1966, as Janet Bewley Cathie, she married the Olympic oarsman Hugh Wardell-Yerburgh, and they had one daughter, Atlanta Jane, born in 1969. In the early years of the marriage, her husband was a schoolmaster at Eton College, and they lived at Datchet. He joined Plessey as a systems analyst but was killed in a road accident in January 1970. They were then living on Ham Island, Old Windsor.

In May 1973, as Janet Wardell-Yerburgh, she married David Cooksey, who was knighted in 1993. They had two children, Leanda (born 1974) and Alexander (born 1976), and lived at Aston House, Lower Mall, Hammersmith, and Brooklands, Swanwick, Hampshire. Brooklands is a country house which had been divided into three, and in the 1980s the Cookseys bought one of these, then later acquired the other two, restoring them into a single house and bringing in Roy Strong to design a pond and water features. They were divorced in 2003. Brooklands was sold in 2006.

Cooksey is now the partner of fellow Olympic fencer Dr Graham Paul.

== Publication ==
- J. C. B. Cooksey, Alexander Nasmyth H.R.S.A. 1758–1840: a Man of the Scottish Renaissance (Southampton, 1991)
