= Fencing at the 1970 British Commonwealth Games =

- Venue: Meadowbank Sports Centre
- Location: Edinburgh, Scotland
- Dates: 16 to 25 July 1970

Fencing at the 1970 British Commonwealth Games was the sixth and last appearance of Fencing at the Commonwealth Games.

The events took place in one of the three sports halls forming part of the Meadowbank Sports Centre, which was built specifically for the Games, at a cost of £2.8 million.

England won seven of the eight gold medals to top the table.

== Medal table ==
* Host nation (Scotland)

Medals won by nation with totals, ranked by number of golds—sortable
Rank	Nation	Gold	Silver	Bronze	Total
1	England	7	2	3	12
2	Scotland*	1	3	1	5
3	Australia	0	2	1	3
4	Canada	0	1	3	4
Totals (4 entries)		8	8	8	24

== Medal winners ==
Fencing results by event
Event	Gold	Silver	Bronze
Foil, Men	Mike Breckin (ENG)	Barry Paul (ENG)	Graham Paul (ENG)
Foil – Team, Men	England (ENG); Barry Paul; Graham Paul; Mike Breckin	Australia (AUS); Ernest Simon; Gregory Benko; Bill Ronald	Canada (CAN); Gerry Wiedel; Konrad Widmaier; Magdy Conyd
Épée, Men	Bill Hoskyns (ENG)	Lester Wong (CAN)	Peter Jacobs (ENG)
Épée – Team, Men	England (ENG); Bill Hoskyns; Peter Jacobs; Ralph Johnson	Scotland (SCO); George Sandor; Ian Hunter; Derek Russell	Canada (CAN); Konrad Widmaier; Lester Wong; Peter Bakonyi
Sabre, Men	Alexander Leckie (SCO)	Rodney Craig (ENG)	Richard Cohen (ENG)
Sabre- Team, Men	England (ENG); David Acfield; Rodney Craig; Richard Cohen	Scotland (SCO); Tony Mitchell; Sandy Leckie; Gordon Wiles	Australia (AUS); Gabor Arato; Gregory Benko; Laszlo Tornallyay
Foil, Women	Janet Wardell-Yerburgh (ENG)	Marion Exelby (AUS)	Susan Youngs (SCO)
Foil – Team, Women	England (ENG); Clare Henley; Janet Wardell-Yerburgh; Sue Green	Scotland (SCO); Barbara Williams; Judith Bain; Susan Youngs	Canada (CAN); Fleurette Campeau; Kay Aoyama; Pacita Weidel

== Results ==
=== Foil (men) ===
Final pool (round robin)

Pos	Athlete	Wins
1	(England) Mike Breckin	4 won by barrage
2	(England) Barry Paul	4
3	(England) Graham Paul	3
4	(Australia) Gregory Benko	2
5	(New Zealand) Brian Pickworth	1
6	(Canada) Magdy Conyd	1

=== Épée (men) ===
Final pool (round robin)

Pos	Athlete	Wins
1	(England) Bill Hoskyns	4
2	(Canada) Lester Wong	3
3	(England) Peter Jacobs	3
4	(Canada) Peter Bakonyi	2
5	(Scotland) Derek Russell	2
6	(England) Ralph Johnson	1

=== Sabre (men) ===
Final pool (round robin)

Pos	Athlete	Wins
1	(Scotland) Sandy Leckie	5
2	(England) Rodney Craig	4
3	(England) Richard Cohen	3
4	(Scotland) Gordon Wiles	2
5	(Canada) Leslie Samek	1
6	(Canada) Robert Foxcroft	0

=== Foil (team) ===
Final pool (round robin)

Team 1	Team 2	Score
England	Australia	5–4
Canada	Scotland	8–1
Australia	Canada	6–3
England	Scotland	6–3
England	Canada	8–1
Scotland	Australia	5–4

=== Épée (team) ===
Final pool (round robin)

Team 1	Team 2	Score
England	Scotland	5–4
Canada	New Zealand	5–3
England	Canada	7–2
Scotland	New Zealand	5–4
England	New Zealand	5–0
Scotland	Canada	5–2

=== Sabre (team) ===
Final pool (round robin)

Team 1	Team 2	Score
England	Scotland	6–3
Australia	Canada	6–3
England	Canada	7–2
Scotland	Australia	8–1
Scotland	Canada	5–3
England	Australia	9–0

=== Foil (women) ===
Final pool (round robin)

Pos	Athlete	Wins
1	(England) Janet Wardell-Yerburgh	4
2	(Australia) Marion Exelby	4
3	(Scotland) Susan Youngs	3
4	(England) Sue Green	3
5	(Wales) Julia Barkley	1
6	(Scotland) Barbara Williams	0

=== Foil (women team) ===
Final pool (round robin)

Team 1	Team 2	Score
England	Canada	8–1
Scotland	Australia	5–4
England	Scotland	7–2
Canada	Australia	6–3
England	Australia	5–4
Scotland	Canada	6–3

== See also ==
- List of Commonwealth Games medallists in fencing
