= Harold Stevenson (bowls) =

Irish international lawn bowler

Personal information
- Nationality: British (Northern Irish)

Sport
- Sport: Lawn bowls
- Club: Donaghadee BC
Medal record
Representing Northern Ireland
Commonwealth Games
Bronze medal – third place	1970 Edinburgh	fours

Harold Stevenson is a retired Irish international lawn bowler.

== Biography ==
Stevenson was a member of the Donaghadee Bowls Club.

He represented the Northern Irish team at the 1970 British Commonwealth Games in Edinburgh. He participated in the fours event with Edward Gordon, John Higgins and Billy Tate, winning a bronze medal.
