= Jean Fielding =

British athlete

Personal information
- Nationality: British (English)
- Born: Q1. 1943 Liverpool, England

Sport
- Sport: Athletics
- Event: Discus throw
- Club: Liverpool Harriers

Jean A. Fielding née Heath (born 1943) is a former international athlete who competed at the Commonwealth Games.

== Biography ==
Born Jean Heath, she married in 1963 and was a member of the Liverpool Harriers and specialised in the discus throw. She was a seven-times Northern champion in 1965, 1965, 1968, 1969, 1970, 1973 and 1974. and won the 1969 Scottish Championships.

Fielding represented the England team at the 1970 British Commonwealth Games in Edinburgh, Scotland, where she competed in the discus throw event.
