= Athletics at the 1970 British Commonwealth Games – Men's shot put =

Men's shot put at the 1970 British Commonwealth Games
- Venue: Meadowbank Stadium, Edinburgh
- Dates: 25 July 1970

Medalists
gold medal	Dave Steen	Canada
silver medal	Jeff Teale	England
bronze medal	Les Mills	New Zealand

The men's shot put event at the 1970 British Commonwealth Games was held on 25 July at the Meadowbank Stadium in Edinburgh, Scotland.

== Results ==
Final results
Rank	Name	Nationality	Distance	Notes
1st place, gold medalist(s)	Dave Steen	Canada	19.21	
2nd place, silver medalist(s)	Jeff Teale	England	18.43	
3rd place, bronze medalist(s)	Les Mills	New Zealand	18.40	
4	Geoff Capes	England	17.06	
5	Brian Caulfield	Canada	16.83	
6	Mike Lindsay	Scotland	16.77	
7	Martyn Lucking	England	16.71	
8	John Walters	Wales	16.05	
9	Yovan Ochola	Uganda	15.36	
	Imbert Roberts	Saint Lucia	DNS	
