= Athletics at the 1970 British Commonwealth Games – Women's high jump =

Women's high jump at the 1970 British Commonwealth Games
- Venue: Meadowbank Stadium, Edinburgh
- Dates: 25 July 1970

Medalists
gold medal	Debbie Brill	Canada
silver medal	Ann Wilson	England
bronze medal	Moira Wells	Scotland

The women's high jump event at the 1970 British Commonwealth Games was held on 25 July at the Meadowbank Stadium in Edinburgh, Scotland.

== Results ==
Final result
Rank	Name	Nationality	Height	Notes
1st place, gold medalist(s)	Debbie Brill	Canada	1.78	
2nd place, silver medalist(s)	Ann Wilson	England	1.70	
3rd place, bronze medalist(s)	Moira Walls	Scotland	1.70	
4	Audrey Reid	Jamaica	1.67	
5	Deborah Van Kiekebelt	Canada	1.67	
6=	Dorothy Shirley	England	1.62	
6=	Modupe Oshikoya	Nigeria	1.62	
6=	Janet Oldall	England	1.62	
9	Andrea Bruce	Jamaica	1.62	
10	Christine Craig	Wales	1.62	
	Mebbi Sitali	Zambia	NM	
