= William Tate (bowls) =

Northern Irish international lawn bowler

Personal information
- Nationality: Northern Irish
- Born: 7 January 1918 Belfast, Northern Ireland
- Died: 5 March 1977 (aged 59) Forster Green Hospital, Belfast

Sport
- Sport: Lawn bowls
- Club: Bangor BC
Medal record
Representing Northern Ireland
Commonwealth Games
| Bronze medal – third place | 1970 Edinburgh | fours |
British Isles Championships
| Gold medal – first place | 1964 | singles |

William "Billy" Tate (7 January 1918 – 5 March 1977) was an international lawn bowler from Northern Ireland.

== Bowls career ==
Tate won a bronze medal in the fours, at the 1970 British Commonwealth Games in Edinburgh; alongside John Higgins, Harold Stevenson and Edward Gordon. Four years later, he represented Northern Ireland for a second successive Commonwealth Games in 1974.

He was also part of the fours team that missed out on a medal at the 1972 World Outdoor Bowls Championship, when a combined Ireland team finished in fourth place in the fours competition. He represented the Northern Irish team at the 1974 British Commonwealth Games in Christchurch, New Zealand, where he competed in the pairs event, with Billy Pimley.

He won the 1963 Irish National Bowls Championships singles and won the singles at the British Isles Bowls Championships in 1964.
