= Keith Sinclair (field hockey) =

British hockey player

Personal information
- Born: 26 June 1945 (age 81) Sunderland, England
- Height: 190 cm (6 ft 3 in)
- Weight: 79 kg (174 lb)

Sport
- Sport: Field hockey
- Position: Left half
Senior career
Years	Team	Caps	Goals
1966–1973	Tulse Hill	-	-
National team
Years	Team	Caps	Goals
–	England		-
–	Great Britain		-

Keith Sinclair (born 26 June 1945) is a British field hockey player who competed at the 1968 Summer Olympics and the 1972 Summer Olympics.

== Biography ==
Sinclair studied at the University of Manchester played club hockey for Tulse Hill, and represented Cheshire at county level.

While with Tulse Hill he represented the England U23 team, Great Britain at the 1968 Olympic Games in Mexico City and the Great Britain team again at the 1972 Olympic Games in Munich.
