= Athletics at the 1970 British Commonwealth Games – Women's discus throw =

Women's discus throw at the 1970 British Commonwealth Games
- Venue: Meadowbank Stadium, Edinburgh
- Dates: 18 July 1970

Medalists
gold medal	Rosemary Payne	Scotland
silver medal	Jean Roberts	Australia
bronze medal	Carol Martin	Canada

The women's discus throw event at the 1970 British Commonwealth Games was held on 18 July at the Meadowbank Stadium in Edinburgh, Scotland.

== Results ==
Final result
Rank	Name	Nationality	Distance	Notes
1st place, gold medalist(s)	Rosemary Payne	Scotland	54.46	
2nd place, silver medalist(s)	Jean Roberts	Australia	51.02	
3rd place, bronze medalist(s)	Carol Martin	Canada	48.42	
4	Anne Karner	Australia	48.16	
5	Joan Pavelich	Canada	48.12	
6	Brenda Bedford	England	46.12	
7	Sally-Ann Mene	New Zealand	45.86	
8	Diane Charteris	New Zealand	44.12	
9	Gay Porter	Northern Ireland	43.74	
10	Barbara James	England	42.46	
11	Lilias Dykes	Scotland	42.22	
12	Marleen Kurt	Canada	40.58	
13	Jean Fielding	England	40.48	
14	Wendy Blackwood	Scotland	34.80	
