= Alex Henderson (bowls) =

Scottish lawn bowler

Personal information
- Nationality: British (Scottish)

Sport
- Sport: Lawn bowls
- Club: Craigentinny BC, Edinburgh
Medal record
Representing Scotland
British Isles Championships
Gold medal – first place	1969	pairs

Alex Henderson also known as Sandy Henderson was an international lawn bowler from Scotland.

== Biography ==
Henderson represented the Scotland team, at the 1970 British Commonwealth Games in Edinburgh, Scotland. Partnering Bill Scott in the pairs event, the duo finished one place outside of the medal positions in fourth place.

Henderson won the pairs with Scott at the Scottish National Bowls Championships in 1968 and subsequently won the British Isles Bowls Championships the following year in 1969.
