= Athletics at the 1970 British Commonwealth Games – Women's shot put =

Women's shot put at the 1970 British Commonwealth Games
- Venue: Meadowbank Stadium, Edinburgh
- Dates: 23 July 1970

Medalists
gold medal	Mary Peters	Northern Ireland
silver medal	Barbara Poulsen	New Zealand
bronze medal	Jean Roberts	Australia

The women's shot put event at the 1970 British Commonwealth Games was held on 23 July at the Meadowbank Stadium in Edinburgh, Scotland.

== Results ==
Final result
Rank	Name	Nationality	Distance	Notes
1st place, gold medalist(s)	Mary Peters	Northern Ireland	15.93	
2nd place, silver medalist(s)	Barbara Poulsen	New Zealand	15.87	
3rd place, bronze medalist(s)	Jean Roberts	Australia	15.32	
4	Anne Karner	Australia	14.52	
5	Brenda Bedford	England	14.15	
6	Diane Charteris	New Zealand	13.59	
7	Joan Pavelich	Canada	13.57	
8	Marleen Kurt	Canada	13.55	
9	Gay Porter	Northern Ireland	13.28	
10	Carol Martin	Canada	12.46	
11	Heather Stuart	Scotland	12.21	
12	Maureen Pearce	Wales	11.23	
