= David Cooksey =

British policy advisor (1940–2024)

Sir David Cooksey GBE FRS

Personal details
- Born: David James Scott Cooksey; 14 May 1940
- Died: 28 January 2024 (aged 83)
- Education: Westminster School; St Edmund Hall, Oxford

Sir David James Scott Cooksey (14 May 1940 – 28 January 2024) was a British businessman, venture capitalist and policy advisor.

== Education ==
Cooksey was educated at Westminster School and St Edmund Hall, Oxford, where he gained a degree in metallurgy. He was made an Honorary Fellow in 1995.

== Career ==
Cooksey embarked on a career as an industrial engineer, rising through the management of the company Formica International, and finally leading the management buy-out of a subsidiary in 1971.

In 1981, he formed Advent Venture Partners, one of the first venture capital firms in the United Kingdom, which provided financing for technology-based businesses. He remained chairman until September 2006. He was the first chairman of the British Venture Capital Association (1983/4) and chairman of the European Private Equity and Venture Capital Association (2005/6).

Cooksey was chairman of the Audit Commission from 1986 to 1995, and in 1996, as chairman of the Local Government Commission for England, proposed the introduction of unitary authorities in many areas of England.

In 2003, Cooksey was appointed to chair the Biosciences Industry Growth Taskforce by HM Treasury and the DTI and issued the report "Biosciences 2015" that year. He revised and reissued the report in 2009.

In 2006, he published the Cooksey Review of UK health research for HM Treasury which led to a new funding structure and approach to medical research in the UK. It also paved the way to new approaches to pharmaceutical licensing.

Cooksey was a director of the Bank of England from 1994 until 2005, including a period as Chairman of Directors from 2001. He was a Governor of the Wellcome Trust from 1995 to 2000, and was Chairman of the Board of Directors at Diamond Light Source Ltd from its formation in 2002 until September 2008. He was chairman of the Francis Crick Institute from 2009 to August 2017. He was Pro Chancellor of the University of Southampton from 2009–2013. He was Chairman of London and Continental Railways from 2006 to 2011. He was appointed chairman of Bechtel Ltd in 2008. He chaired UK Financial Investments Limited from 2009 to 2012.

== Personal life ==
In May 1973, Cooksey married Janet Wardell-Yerburgh, known as Poppy, the widow of the Olympic oarsman Hugh Wardell-Yerburgh, who had a daughter from her first marriage. They had a daughter and a son, born in 1974 and 1976, and lived at Brooklands, Swanwick, Hampshire, and Aston House, Lower Mall, Hammersmith. They were divorced in 2003. Cooksey married Mary Ann Lutyens, widow of Richard Lutyens, in January 2011.

He was a keen sailor and a member of the Royal Yacht Squadron.

Sir David Cooksey died from a heart attack on 28 January 2024, at the age of 83.

== Awards and honours ==
Cooksey was knighted in 1993. He was appointed a Knight Grand Cross of the Order of the British Empire (GBE) in the Queen's Birthday Honours 2007 for public service. He has received Honorary Degrees from University College London, University of Southampton and Kingston University and he has Honorary Fellowships at The Academy of Medical Sciences, University of Wales, Cardiff University, Imperial College London, King's College London and the British Science Association. He was elected Honorary Fellow of the Royal Society of London in 2020.

== Sources ==
- Our Board of Directors, Diamond Light Source Ltd
- The Private Equity Awards Hall of Fame
- Sir David Cooksey: The yacht can wait until the £1.3bn health research spend is shipshape The Independent, 23 April 2006
- Curriculum Vitae, European Private Equity and Venture Capital Association
- "Queen's Birthday Honours 2007" (PDF). (476 KiB), BBC News
