= Norman Pryde =

Scottish lawn bowler

Personal information
- Nickname: Norrie
- Nationality: Scottish

Sport
- Club: Newbattle BC
Medal record
Representing Scotland
Commonwealth Games
| Silver medal – second place | 1970 Edinburgh | fours |

Norman Pryde also known as Norrie Pryde is a retired Scottish international lawn bowler.

== Bowls career ==
He won a silver medal in the fours at the 1970 British Commonwealth Games in Edinburgh with Alex McIntosh, David Pearson and John Slight.

He also won the Scottish National Bowls Championships fours title (with McIntosh, Pearson and Slight) in 1968 and the pairs title with McIntosh in 1973.
