= Peter Jacobs (fencer) =

British fencer (born 1938)

Peter Jacobs MBE
Personal information
- Nationality: British (English)
- Born: 26 September 1938 (age 88) Pinner, London, England
- Education: Merchant Taylors' School, Northwood; Queens' College, Cambridge

Sport
- Sport: Fencing
- Event: Épée
- College team: Cambridge University
- Club: Thames Fencing Club
Medal record
Fencing
Representing Great Britain
World Fencing Championships
Silver medal – second place	1965 Paris	Team épée
Summer Universiade
Gold medal – first place	1963 Porto Alegre	Individual épée
Representing England
British Empire & Commonwealth Games
Gold medal – first place	1962 Perth	Team épée
Bronze medal – third place	1962 Perth	Individual épée
Gold medal – first place	1966 Kingston	Team épée
Gold medal – first place	1970 Edinburgh	Team épée
Bronze medal – third place	1970 Edinburgh	Individual épée

Peter Jacobs MBE (born 26 September 1938) is a British épée fencer who competed at the Olympics.

== Early and personal life ==
Jacobs was born in Pinner, Greater London, Great Britain, to Jewish parents. He attended Queens' College, Cambridge, where he studied Classics.

== Fencing career ==
Jacobs was a three-time fencing Blue from 1960–62, and was on the winning team each time. In 1960, he became the first post-war undergraduate to win the UK’s oldest épée competition, the Miller-Hallett Cup. He also won the Universities Athletic Union épée title in 1961.

Having missed out on a medal by a single hit at the 1961 Summer Universiade in Sofia, Jacobs won the épée title two years later at the 1963 event in Porto Alegre, Brazil. In between the two Universiades he was a three times British fencing champion winning the épée title at the British Fencing Championships in 1962, 1964 and 1970.

In total, Jacobs won five British Empire/Commonwealth Games medals - a bronze medal in men's épée and a gold medal in team épée at the 1962 Commonwealth Games in Perth, Western Australia, team gold at the 1966 Commonwealth Games in Kingston, Jamaica and again at the 1970 Commonwealth Games in Edinburgh, where he also won an individual bronze medal.

Jacobs won one world championship medal, a team épée silver at the 1965 World Fencing Championships in Paris.

Jacobs competed in individual and team épée at the 1964 Summer Olympics in Tokyo, topping his pool in the first round with a 6–1 win–loss record. Four years later he again represented Great Britain in team épée at the 1968 Summer Olympics in Mexico City.

He went to a third Games in Montreal in 1976 as the Great Britain fencing captain. He was captain of the British épée team from 1971–76 and was the overall team manager from 1973–76.

Jacobs wrote the foreword to the book entitled Fencing: Techniques of Foil, Epee and Sabre by Brian Pitman (1988). He served on the Executive Committee of the Fédération Internationale d'Escrime (FIE) for 24 years, 12 as secretary-treasurer, and stepped down in 2013 and was elected to the Legal Commission. He was an A-graded FIE épée referee and worked on the Directoire Technique (DT) at multiple FIE world championships and Olympic Games.

He was appointed a Member of the Order of the British Empire (MBE) in the 2019 New Year Honours for services to British and International Fencing.
