= Courting Justice =

2004 book by David Boies

- Hardcover edition, published by Miramax Books
- Author: David Boies
- Language: English
- Subject: Law
- Publisher: Miramax Books
- Publication date: October 13, 2004
- Publication place: United States
- Media type: Print (Hardcover)
- Pages: 496 pp
- ISBN: 0-7868-6838-4
- OCLC: 762218785

Courting Justice: From NY Yankees v. Major League Baseball to Bush v. Gore, 1997–2000 is a non-fiction book by David Boies, published in 2004 by Miramax Books.

This book covers some of the cases of high-profile attorney David Boies, recounted by Boies in memoir-like style. These cases include Bush v. Gore (2000), United States v. Microsoft, and New York Yankees v. Major League Baseball.

== Reviews and Critiques ==
- David Feige
- CNNMoney.com
