= David Pearson (bowls) =

Personal information
- Nationality: Scottish

Sport
- Club: Newbattle BC
Medal record
Representing Scotland
Commonwealth Games
Silver medal – second place	1970 Edinburgh	fours

David G Pearson is a Scottish retired international lawn bowler.

== Bowls career ==
He won a silver medal in the fours at the 1970 British Commonwealth Games in Edinburgh with Alex McIntosh, Norman Pryde and John Slight.

He also won the Scottish National Bowls Championships fours title (with McIntosh, Pryde and Slight) in 1968.
