= Barbara James (writer) =

Northern Territory journalist & activist

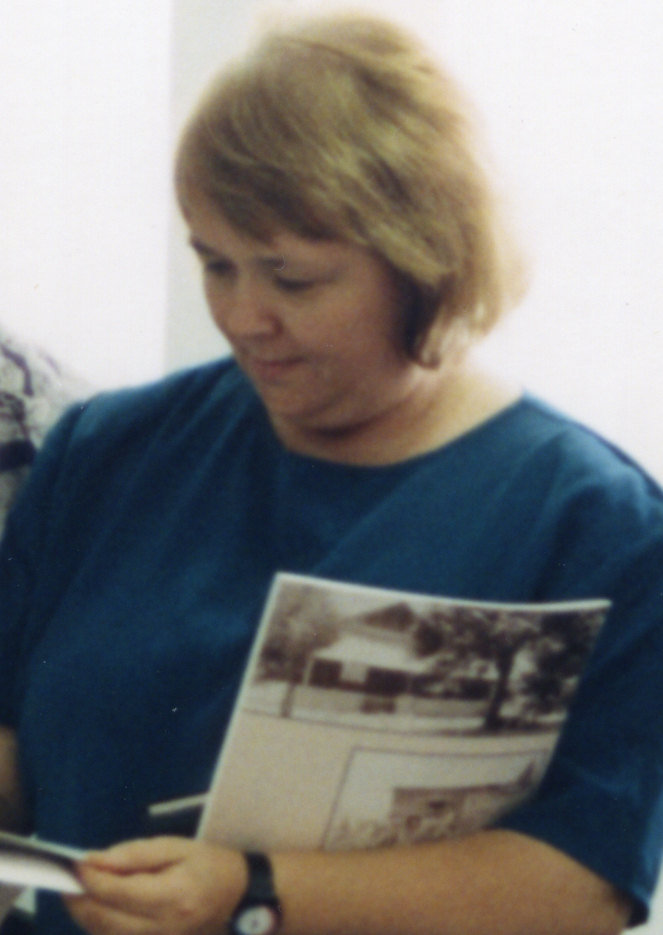
Barbara James (1992).

Barbara James (née Johnson) (9 November 1943 – 31 March 2003) was an author, historian, journalist, political adviser and activist based in Darwin in the Northern Territory of Australia. James is best known for documenting the contribution of women to the development of the Northern Territory in books and articles, most significantly, the award-winning No Man’s Land: Women in the Northern Territory. She was also a press secretary and adviser to Bob Collins, Leader of the Territory Opposition and Senator for the Northern Territory and later Clare Martin, Chief Minister of the Northern Territory.

== Early life ==
James grew up in Holdrege, Nebraska in the United States of America. Her parents were Norris and Dorothy Johnson. She graduated with a Bachelor of Arts majoring in English and Education with a minor in Journalism and History.

== Life in the Northern Territory ==
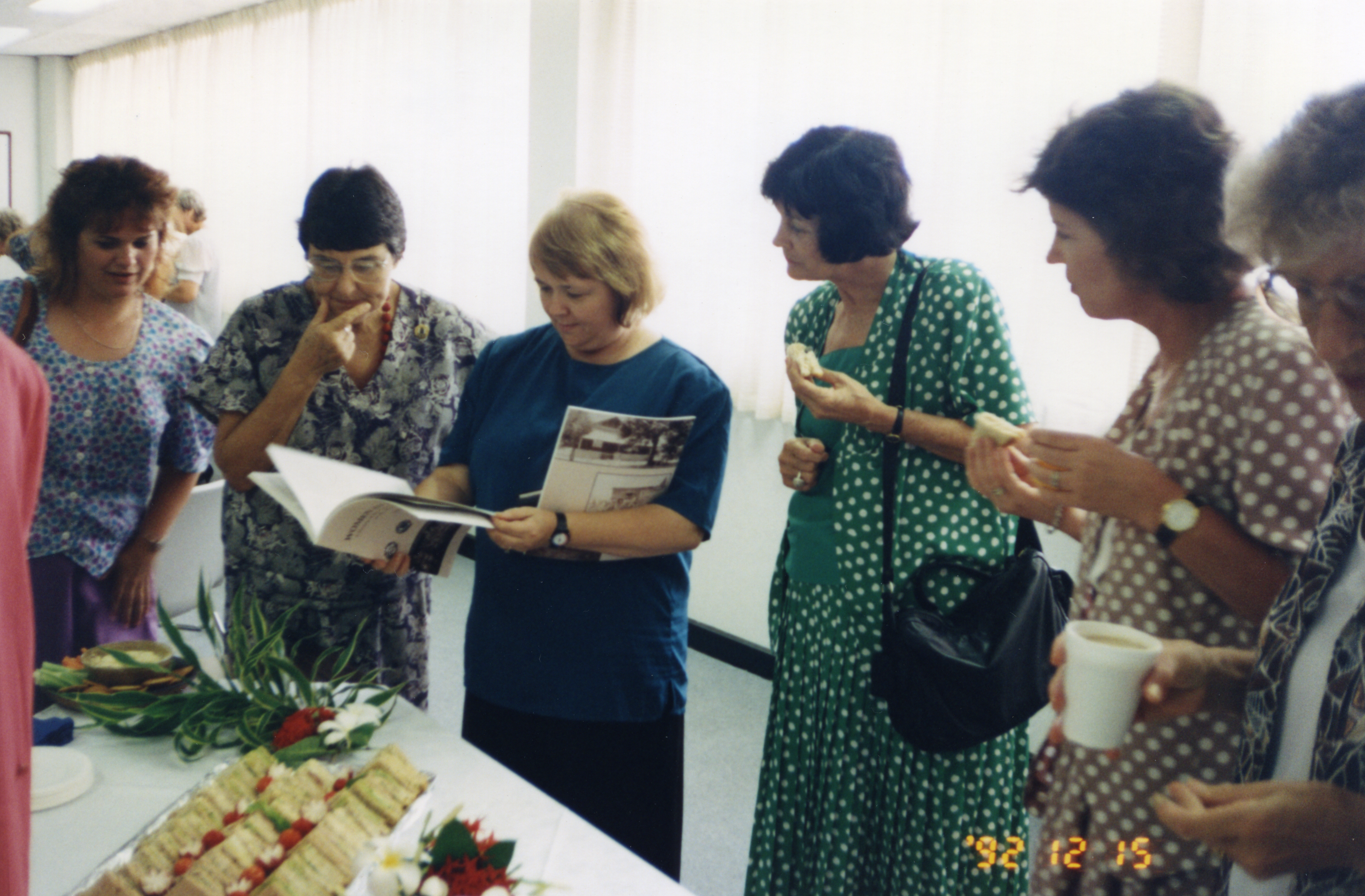
Barbara James (centre) at a book launch.

James moved to Australia in 1966. One year later she travelled to the Top End for a two-week holiday. When her car broke down on the way home, she returned to Darwin and never left. James said later that Darwin “seduced me immediately”.

She lived in Nightcliff and Fannie Bay marrying Darwin solicitor Geoff James in 1968. She initially worked at the Northern Territory News under editor Jim Bowditch. James followed up with freelance work at the ABC. James was on night duty in the ABC newsroom when Cyclone Tracy struck Darwin in December 1974. She was evacuated shortly after. She became involved in citizen's groups actively liaising with Darwin residents as a community consultant for the then Department of Urban and Regional Development, the Australian Council of Social Services, the Cities Commission and the Environment Centre in Darwin for which she was the executive officer for four years.

She was bed-ridden for nearly a year, after falling from a camel in 1981 in Alice Springs. She then worked as a journalist for the Darwin Star but left in 1981 to focus on oral history interviews. In 1982, her marriage with Geoff James ended and she sharpened her focus on historical writing.

She then worked as a project administrator for the National Trust, a member of CSIRO NT and later a ministerial/press officer for Senator Bob Collins, then Leader of the Territory Opposition and the Parliamentary Labor Party in the NT. James also worked for Chief Minister of the Northern Territory Clare Martin, and is credited for persuading her to enter politics.

Her best known work No Man's Land: Women of the Northern Territory was published in 1989 and quickly became a best-seller. The book was later developed into a play.

She won a number of awards including the 2001 NT Heritage Award, the 2000 NT Literary Essay Award and the Chief Minister's Women's Achievement Award in 1999.

== Later life ==
James was a life member of the Australian Labor Party. She died on 31 March 2003 at the age of 59 from cancer at her East Point Home, Fannie Bay. Her funeral was held at Christ Church Cathedral, followed by a wake at historic Burnett House.

Barbara James house, an accommodation facility for cancer patients in Darwin, is named in her honor.

== List of publications ==
=== Author ===
- 1989 – No Man’s Land: Women in the Northern Territory
- 1989 – The Little Bush Maid
- 1988 – Twenty Years On, a history of the NT Law Society covering their first 20 years
- 1989 – A Territory Knight to Remember – John George Knight, NT State Reference Library Occasional Paper
- 1989 – Territory Women of Words, NT State Reference Library Occasional Paper
- 1987–88 – People on the Move report of a National Trust project

=== Contributor ===
- 1989 – Northern Territory Dictionary of Biography, DIT Press
- 1989 – The Australian Women’s Diary, Doubleday, Sydney
- 1988 – 200 Australian Women a Redress anthology, Women's Redress Press
- 1988 Red Dust and Distant Horizons, NT Education Department
