= Edward Hodson =

English cricketer

Edward Robert Hodson (born 16 August 1964) was an English cricketer. He was a right-handed batsman who played for Norfolk. He was born in Lincoln.

Hodson made his Minor Counties Cricket Championship debut for Norfolk against his home county of Lincolnshire. He played his only List A match the following season, against Hampshire. Hodson scored 12 runs in the match.

Hodson continued to represent Norfolk in the Minor Counties Cricket Championship until 1988. He then played for Coventry and North Warwickshire Cricket Club in the Birmingham and District Premier League between 1990 and 2004. His highest score in a single match was 121.

He retired in 2009.
