= John Clewarth =

British cyclist

Personal information
- Born: 15 January 1948 (age 78) Liverpool, England

Cycling career
- Sport: Cycling

John Clewarth (born 15 January 1948) is a former British cyclist. He competed in the individual road race and team time trial events at the 1972 Summer Olympics.
