= Ronnie Nasralla =

Jamaican businessman (died 2021)

- Born: 1930 or 1931; Kingston, Colony of Jamaica, British Empire
- Died: 20 January 2021 (aged 90); Atlanta, Georgia, U.S.
- Occupations: Record producer, manager, businessman

Ronnie Nasralla OD (1930/1 – 20 January 2021) was a Jamaican record producer and businessman, best known for his work in the music industry with Byron Lee & the Dragonaires.

== Biography ==
Nasralla was born in Kingston, Jamaica to a Lebanese father and Jamaican mother. He attended St. George's College, where he met Byron Lee, joining the early incarnation of the Dragonaires. A keen sportsman, Nasralla represented Jamaica in fencing, badminton, squash and football.

Through Edward Seaga he was introduced to artist management in the early 1960s, going on to manage the Dragonaires as well as The Blues Busters and The Maytals. He produced tracks by The Blues Busters and The Maytals which were released on his BMN record label. Nasralla also auditioned for bands to appear in the club scene of Dr. No, notably rejecting Bob Marley and the Wailers because they were "untidy". He eventually chose the Dragonaires.

He was involved in the Jamaican contribution to the 1964 World's Fair, choreographing ska dancers. In 1965 he formed Lee Enterprises with Byron Lee and Victor Sampson. He co-produced several recordings with Lee, including The Maytals' "It's You" and "Daddy". He also worked with Lee at the Dynamic Sounds recording studio. His contribution to the music industry in Jamaica was rewarded with a medal at the National Honours and Awards ceremony in the 1980s.

He later worked in the public relations and advertising industry, setting up Nasralla Promotions Ltd. and organizing events such as the Negril Music Festival.

Nasralla's autobiography, Lessons to Learn, was published in 2009.

In 2013, Nasralla was awarded the Order of Distinction by the Jamaican government.

Nasralla died peacefully at his home in Atlanta, U.S. on 20 January 2021 with his wife Rosemary by his side.
