= Neville Stone =

Australian rules footballer

Personal information
- Full name: Neville Francis Stone
- Born: 14 December 1946 (age 79)
- Height: 182 cm (6 ft 0 in)
- Weight: 80 kg (176 lb)

Playing career^{1}
| Years | Club | Games (Goals) |
| 1966–69 | Melbourne | 35 (19) |
| 1970–74 | Waverley (VFA) | |
- ^{1} Playing statistics correct to the end of 1974.

Neville Francis Stone (born 14 December 1946) is a former Australian rules footballer who played with Melbourne in the Victorian Football League (VFL).
