= Moira Walls =

British high jumper, long jumper and pentathlete

Moira Maguire née Walls
Personal information
- Nationality: British (Scottish)
- Born: 4 May 1952 (age 74) Glasgow, Scotland

Sport
- Sport: Athletics
- Event(s): High jumper, long jumper, pentathlete
- Club: Edinburgh Southern Harriers
Medal record
Representing Scotland
Women's Athletics
British Commonwealth Games
Bronze medal – third place	1970 Edinburgh	Long jump

Moira Lindsay Maguire née Walls (born 4 May 1952), is a Scottish former high jumper, long jumper and pentathlete. She won a bronze medal in the high jump at the 1970 British Commonwealth Games in Edinburgh and competed at the 1976 Summer Olympics.

== Biography ==
Walls, born in Glasgow, Scotland, was a member of Edinburgh Southern Harriers Athletics Club.

Walls became the British pentathlon champion after winning the British WAAA Championships title at the 1969 WAAA Championships. She also became Scottish national champion in the hurdles, high jump and long jump, and also won a long jump event at the Crystal Palace National Sports Centre, with a best jump of 20 feet 10.5 inches (6.36 m). As a result of her success, Walls was a winner of the 1969 BBC Scotland Sports Personality of the Year award, along with Bernard Gallacher.

Walls competed for Scotland in the high jump event at the 1970 British Commonwealth Games in Edinburgh, winning the bronze medal, and is the only Scottish high jumper to have won a Commonwealth Games medal. In 1970, she had the best performance by a European in a long jump competition, after jumping 21 feet 3 inches (6.48 m). She was also ranked number two in Europe for pentathlon, and in the top six in Europe for the high jump.

Walls competed in the high jump at the 1976 Olympics Games in Montreal, finishing 31st. In 1977, Walls broke the Scottish national high jump record, after clearing a height of 1.83 metres (6 ft 0 in). She was the first Scottish woman to clear a height of over 6 foot.

== Family ==
Her daughter Lindsey Maguire competed for Great Britain in rowing at the 2012 Summer Olympics in London.
