= Richard Cohen (fencer) =

British fencer (born 1947)

Personal information
- Nationality: British (English)
- Born: 9 May 1947 (age 79) Birmingham, England

Sport
- Country: England (1970-1986); Northern Ireland (1986-present)
- Sport: Fencing (sabre)
Medal record
Fencing
Representing England
British Commonwealth Games
Gold medal – first place	1970 Edinburgh	sabre team
Bronze medal – third place	1970 Edinburgh	sabre individual

Richard A Cohen (born 9 May 1947) is a retired fencer who competed at three Olympic Games for Great Britain. He is also an author and publisher.

== Fencing career ==
Cohen was born in Birmingham, England, to a Jewish father and an Irish Catholic mother. He learned to fence while at Downside School, near Bath. He was a five times British fencing champion, winning the sabre title at the British Fencing Championships in 1974, 1980, 1982, 1986 and 1987. He was selected for the British team in four Olympics from 1972 to 1984, although he did not compete at the Moscow Olympics because of a sporting boycott. He was Commonwealth sabre champion in 1982 and won the prestigious Paris Open in 1981.

He represented England and won a gold medal in the team sabre and a bronze medal in the individual sabre, at the 1970 British Commonwealth Games in Edinburgh, Scotland,

Cohen was World Veterans' Sabre Champion in 2004, 2005, 2008 and 2009 and has been European sabre champion nine times, making him the most successful single-weapon fencer of veteran fencing. He won the national veteran saber championships a record fourteen times.

== Publishing career ==
While competing as a fencer, he worked for book publishers, editing much of the early work of Jeffrey Archer, as well as John le Carre, Anthony Burgess, Kingsley Amis, Sebastian Faulks and Fay Weldon. In 1985 he became publishing director of Hutchinson and in 1992 of Hodder & Stoughton. In 1995 he founded his own publishers, Richard Cohen Books, which won the Sunday Times Small publisher of the Year award in 1998. In 1991 and 1992 he was program director of the Cheltenham Festival of Literature, recording world record audiences of over 30,000 both years, and from 2000 till 2007 was a visiting professor of creative writing at the University of Kingston-upon-Thames in London, England. Since moving to America in 1999, he has edited the No. 1 bestseller Leadership by Rudy Giuliani, all seven books by Madeleine Albright, David Boies' Courting Justice, and the Pulitzer Prize-winning biography of Malcolm X by Manning Marable. Cohen wrote a history of swordplay, By the Sword (2002), with the subtitle A History of Gladiators, Musketeers, Samurai, Swashbucklers, and Olympic Champions; a large-scale history of the Sun, Chasing the Sun, The Epic Story of the Star that Gives Us Life (2010), featured on BBC's Book of the Week broadcast 13–17 December 2010, Random House, a book about literature and how to write, How To Write Like Tolstoy, May 2016, Random House, and Making History (2022), Simon & Schuster, a history of historians from Herodotus to the present day (a BBC Book of the Week for two weeks). He appeared in the James Bond film Die Another Day (2002).

== Personal life ==
Cohen has two sons and a daughter and lives in New York City with his wife Kathy Robbins, a literary agent. His son Guy Cohen won a bronze medal for Great Britain at the 2013 Maccabiah Games in men's épée, and his daughter Mary fenced in épée, Richard Cohen in both foil and saber. His daughter, Mary (born 1986), was British épée champion in 2006, 2011 and 2018, and was a member of the British team at World and European championships from 2002 till 2019. In 2010 father (for Northern Ireland) and daughter (for England) competed in the same Commonwealth championships, the first father and daughter to do so, Cohen at age 63 coming 12th in the saber and winning the veterans saber (over 40), a first gold medal for Northern Ireland in Commonwealth fencing. In June 2017 he was elected a Fellow of the Royal Society of Literature.
