= Barbara James (discus thrower) =

British athlete

Barbara James née Everitt
Personal information
- Nationality: British (English)
- Born: 17 January 1942 Surrey, England
- Died: 16 March 2012 (aged 70)

Sport
- Sport: Athletics
- Event: Discus throw
- Club: Croydon Harriers; Mitcham AC

Barbara E. James née Everitt (17 January 1942 – 16 March 2012) was an international athlete who competed at the Commonwealth Games.

== Biography ==
Born Barbara Everitt, she lived in Foxley Gardens, Purley and attended Roke County Secondary School and in 1959 won the All-England Schools' discus title. Everitt began her athletics career with Croydon Harriers and was selected to go on the British Amateur Athletics Board coaching programme.

By 1963 Everitt was a member of the Mitcham Athletics Club and was the champion of Surrey. She married athletics statistician Martin James in 1965, and competed as Barbara James thereafter.

James represented the England team at the 1970 British Commonwealth Games in Edinburgh, Scotland, where she competed in the discus throw event.
