= Rodney Craig =

British fencer (born 1945)

Personal information
- Nationality: British (English)
- Born: 30 April 1945 (age 81) Slough, England
- Height: 174 cm (5 ft 9 in)
- Weight: 77 kg (170 lb)

Sport
- Sport: Fencing
- Event: Sabre / Épée
- Club: British Army
Medal record
Fencing
Representing England
British Commonwealth Games
Gold medal – first place	1970 Edinburgh	sabre team
Silver medal – second place	1970 Edinburgh	sabre individual

Rodney Craig (born 30 April 1945) is a retired British fencing international who competed at the 1968 and 1972 Summer Olympics.

== Biography ==
Craig was educated at Merchant Taylors' School, Northwood and won the Middlesex Épée Championships aged 17. He later joined the British Army. At the 1968 Olympic Games, in Mexico City, he participated in the individual sabre and team sabre events.

He finished runner-up behind David Acfield in the sabre at the 1969 and 1970 British Fencing Championships.

He also represented England and won a gold medal in the team sabre and a silver medal in the individual sabre, at the 1970 British Commonwealth Games in Edinburgh, Scotland.

A second Olympic Games appearance ensued at the 1972 Olympics in Munich.
