= Barbara James (musician) =

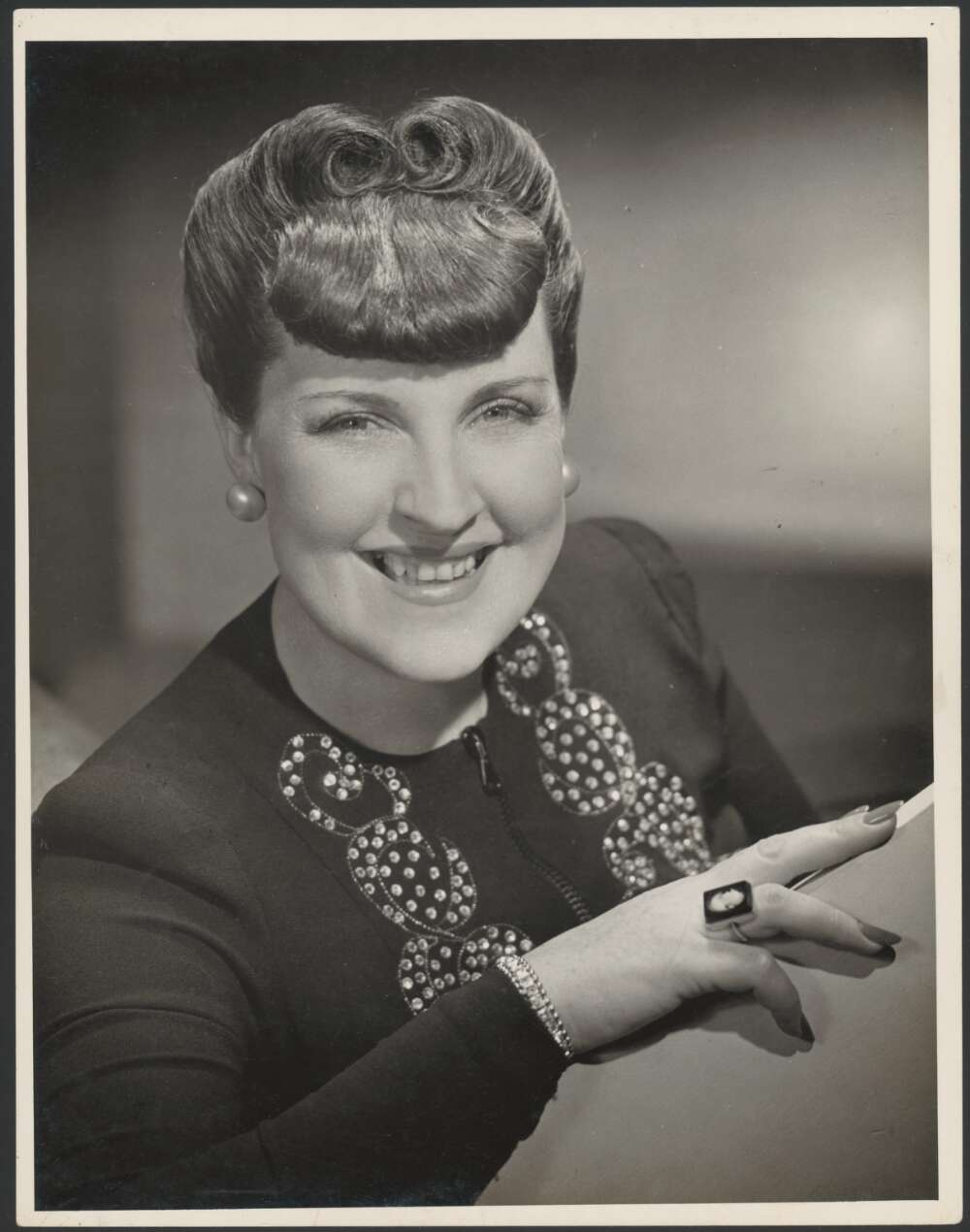
- Barbara James by Rob Hillier c1940s

Background information
- Born: 1908; Sydney, Australia
- Died: 2004 (aged 95–96)
- Genres: jazz, swing
- Occupation: singer

Barbara James (1908–2004) was an Australian jazz vocalist.

== Career ==
Born 1908 in Sydney, James' parents Will James and Malvena Moore were both entertainers. Her father had led an early Australian jazz band in Sydney, and he taught Barbara James to play saxophone and xylophone. At age 13, James was contracted by Harry George Musgrove to perform xylophone in theatres around Australia, and she later joined her father's jazz band as saxophonist and singer, where she began to perform jazz and swing.

Barbara James was considered one of Australia's most famous big band vocalists during the 1930s. She performed with Jim Davidson and Frank Coughlan, among others.

She married pianist Reg Lewis in the 1930s, and they toured England, Europe, and Asia together during the 1940s. During this period they also recorded together. Back in Sydney, they hosted their own radio program over the next decades.

Barbara James died in 2004.
