= Neal Bryce =

Zambian lawn bowler

Personal information
- Nationality: Zambia
Medal record
Representing Zambia
Commonwealth Games
Silver medal – second place	1970 Edinburgh	singles

Neal Bryce is a retired Zambian international lawn bowler.

== Bowls career ==
He won a silver medal in the singles at the 1970 British Commonwealth Games in Edinburgh.
