= Barbara Beable =

New Zealand shot putter and pentathlete (born 1949)

Barbara Beable MNZM
- Beable in 2026

Personal information
- Born: Barbara Poulsen; 14 May 1949 (age 77)

Sport
- Country: New Zealand
- Sport: Track and field
- Events: Shot put; Pentathlon

Achievements and titles
- National finals: Shot put champion (1968–1971, 1975–1978); Pentathlon champion (1971–1972, 1975–1977)
Medal record
Women's athletics
Representing New Zealand
British Commonwealth Games
Silver medal – second place	1970 Edinburgh	Shot put

Barbara Beable MNZM (née Poulsen; born 14 May 1949) is a former New Zealand shot putter and pentathlete.

== Biography ==
At the 1970 British Commonwealth Games she won a silver medal in the women's shot put. She competed at two more British Commonwealth Games in 1974 and 1978, in 1974 she finished 5th in both the women's shot put and pentathlon. Then in 1978 she placed 7th in the pentathlon.

In the 2026 King’s Birthday Honours, Beable was appointed a Member of the New Zealand Order of Merit, for services to athletics.
