= John Slight =

Scottish lawn bowler

Personal information
- Nationality: Scottish

Sport
- Club: Newbattle BC
Medal record
Representing Scotland
Commonwealth Games
Silver medal – second place	1970 Edinburgh	fours

John Slight is a retired Scottish international lawn bowler.

== Bowls career ==
He won a silver medal in the fours at the 1970 British Commonwealth Games in Edinburgh with Alex McIntosh, Norman Pryde and David Pearson.

He also won the Scottish National Bowls Championships fours title (with McIntosh, Pryde and Pearson) in 1968.
