= Edward Hudson (footballer) =

English footballer

Edward Kearney Hudson (January 1887 - January 1945) was an English footballer. His regular position was at full back. He was born in Bolton. He played for Manchester United, Walkden Central, and Stockport County.
