= Lynne Evans =

British archer (born 1948)

Personal information
- Born: 5 August 1948 (age 77) Birmingham
- Height: 1.73 m (5 ft 8 in)

Sport
- Sport: Archery

Lynne Avril Evans MBE (born 5 August 1948 in Birmingham ) is a retired British archer. She competed at the 1972 Olympics and finished in 16th place.

She was appointed MBE in the 1997 Birthday Honours.
