= Ernest Simon (fencer) =

Australian fencer

Personal information
- Full name: Ernest Simon
- Nationality: Australian
- Born: 23 November 1952 (age 73)

Sport
- Country: Australia
- Sport: Fencing
- Team: VRI Fencing Club, MFC
- Now coaching: sport teacher in Sirius College KBC Campus

Achievements and titles
- Olympic finals: won gold in 1978
- Highest world ranking: number 1
Medal record
gold
Fencing
Representing Australia
British Empire Games
Silver medal – second place	1970 Edinburgh	Men's Team Foil

Ernest Simon (born 23 November 1952) is an Australian fencer. He competed in the individual foil events at the 1972 and 1976 Summer Olympics. He was a longstanding member and coach with the Melbourne-based VRI Fencing Club before establishing the Melbourne Fencing Centre in 1999.

== See also ==
- List of NCAA fencing champions
