= Ralph Johnson (fencer) =

British fencer (born 1948)

Personal information
- Nationality: British (English)
- Born: 3 June 1948 (age 78) London, England
- Height: 175 cm (5 ft 9 in)
- Weight: 74 kg (163 lb)

Sport
- Sport: Fencing
- Club: Salle Boston, London
Medal record
Fencing
Representing England
British Commonwealth Games
Gold medal – first place	1970 Edinburgh	épée team

William Ralph Johnson (born 3 June 1948) is a retired British international fencer who competed at three Olympic Games.

== Biography ==
Johnson began fencing aged 13 at St. Dunstan's School. He competed at the 1968, 1972, 1976 and 1984 Summer Olympics.

He represented England and won a gold medal in the épée team event, at the 1970 British Commonwealth Games in Edinburgh, Scotland.

He was a six times British fencing champion, winning the épée title at the British Fencing Championships in 1968, 1982, 1984, 1985, 1987 and 1990.

A solicitor by profession, he won the Kent épée title for the seventh successive year in 1992.
