= Bob Motroni =

Scottish lawn bowler

Personal information
- Nationality: British (Scottish)
- Born: 14 September 1917 Barga, Italy
- Died: 24 April 1984 (aged 66)

Sport
- Sport: Lawn bowls
- Club: Dumfries BC
Medal record
Representing Scotland
British Isles Championships
Gold medal – first place	1970	singles

Renato "Bob" Motroni (14 September 1917 – 24 April 1984) was a Scottish international lawn bowler.

== Bowls career ==
Motroni became the British singles champion after winning the British Isles Bowls Championships in 1969. He was a shopkeeper by trade and played for the Dumfries Bowls Club. He also won two Scottish National Bowls Championships, the singles in 1969 and the pairs in 1965.

Motroni competed in the 1970 Commonwealth Games and was the only player to defeat the legendary David Bryant in the singles tournament.
