= Barry Paul =

British fencer (born 1948)

Personal information
- Born: 10 May 1948 (age 78) Bethnal Green, London, England

Sport
- Sport: Fencing
Medal record
Fencing
Representing England
British Commonwealth Games
Gold medal – first place	1970 Edinburgh	foil team
Silver medal – second place	1970 Edinburgh	foil individual

Barry Christopher Paul (born 10 May 1948) is a retired British international fencer.

== Fencing career ==
He competed in the individual and team foil events at the 1972 and 1976 Summer Olympics. He represented England and won a gold medal in the team foil and a silver medal in the individual foil, at the 1970 British Commonwealth Games in Edinburgh, Scotland.

He was a five times British fencing champion, winning five foil titles at the British Fencing Championships, from 1974 to 1980.

== Personal life ==
He is part of a famous fencing and athletics family; his parents were René Paul and June Foulds, his brother is Graham Paul, his uncle was Raymond Paul and his cousin is Steven Paul.
