= Gregory Benko =

Australian fencer

Personal information
- Nationality: Australian
- Born: 9 October 1952 (age 73)

Sport
- Country: Australia
- Sport: Fencing
Medal record
Fencing
Representing Australia
Commonwealth Games
Silver medal – second place	1970 Edinburgh	Men's Team Foil
Bronze medal – third place	1970 Edinburgh	Men's Team Sabre

Gregory Laurie Benko (born 9 October 1952) is a retired Australian foil fencer who competed at four Olympic Games.

After participating in the 1972 Summer Olympics, Benko was recruited as a member of the Wayne State University men's fencing team. He earned three varsity letters and three national championships in individual foil (1974, 1975, and 1976), a record at the time. Benko participated in several international tournaments over the years, notably winning the 1975 Martini & Rossi Invitational in New York and the 1982 Paris Invitational, and earning the gold medal in épée at the 1974 Commonwealth Fencing Championships. He was a member of the Australian team that won silver and bronze medals in the sabre and foil at the 1970 British Commonwealth Games. He also participated in the 1976, 1980 and 1984 Summer Olympic Games. Benko was a finalist at the 1976 Montreal Olympics, the only Australian fencer to achieve that feat. He was the last (and only second) fencer to win all three Australian open national titles (foils, épée, sabre) in the one year.

== See also ==
- List of NCAA fencing champions
