= Clare Henley-Halsted =

British fencer (born 1948)

Clare Henley-Halsted OBE
Personal information
- Nationality: British (English)
- Born: 18 August 1948 (age 77) Wallingford, Oxfordshire, England
- Height: 160 cm (5 ft 3 in)
- Weight: 57 kg (126 lb)

Sport
- Sport: Fencing
- Event: Foil
- Club: Thames Fencing Club
Medal record
Fencing
Representing England
British Commonwealth Games
Gold medal – first place	1970 Edinburgh	foil team

Clare June Halsted OBE (née Henley; born 18 August 1948) is a retired British international fencer who competed at two Olympic Games.

== Biography ==
She competed in the women's individual and team foil events at the 1972 and 1976 Summer Olympics.

Henley was a member of the Thames Fencing Club.

She represented England in the team foil event, at the 1970 British Commonwealth Games in Edinburgh, Scotland, winning a gold medal.

She married fellow fencing international Nick Halsted in 1972 and their son Laurence Halsted (born 1984) also became an international fencer.

She coached at Finchley Foil in Stanmore from 1992 until the club was shut down in 2023.
