= Judith Bain =

Scottish fencer

Judith Bain née Herriott
Personal information
- Nationality: British (Scottish)
- Born: 11 October 1944 (age 81) Tain, Scotland
- Height: 160 cm (5 ft 3 in)
- Weight: 54 kg (119 lb)

Sport
- Sport: Fencing
- Event: Foil
- Club: Glasgow Fencing Club; Pauleons Fencing Club
Medal record
Fencing
Representing Scotland
British Commonwealth Games
Silver medal – second place	1970 Edinburgh	foil team

Judith Margaret Bain née Herriott (born 11 October 1944) is a British fencer who competed at the 1968 Summer Olympics.

== Biography ==
Born Judith Herriot, she began fencing at Glasgow High School.

Under her maiden name of Herriot, she represented the Scotland team at the 1966 British Empire and Commonwealth Games in Kingston, Jamaica, where she participated in the foil event.

At the 1968 Olympic Games in Mexico City, she participated in the women's individual and team foil events.

Bain won a silver medal at the 1970 Commonwealth Games in the women's foil team event.

In 1968m, she was living in London and was a member of the Pauleons Fencing Club.
