= Pacita Wiedel =

Canadian fencer (born 1933)

Personal information
- Born: 31 March 1933 (age 93)

Sport
- Sport: Fencing

Pacita Wiedel (born 31 March 1933) is a Canadian fencer. She competed in the women's individual foil event at the 1964 Summer Olympics.
