= Edward Hudson (fencer) =

British fencer

Personal information
- Born: 26 March 1946 (age 80)

Sport
- Sport: Fencing
- Event: Épée

Edward Hudson (born 26 March 1946) is a British fencer. He competed in the team épée event at the 1972 Summer Olympics.
