= Robbie Robson =

Personal information
- Born: Hugh Herbert John Robson; 2 November 1918 Wellington, New Zealand
- Died: 17 April 1996 (aged 77) Hamilton, New Zealand

Sport
- Country: New Zealand
- Sport: Lawn bowls
- Club: Tokoroa Bowling Club

Achievements and titles
- National finals: Singles champion (1974); Fours champion (1956)
Medal record
Men's lawn bowls
Representing New Zealand
British Empire and Commonwealth Games
Gold medal – first place	1962 Perth	Pairs
Silver medal – second place	1970 Edinburgh	Pairs

Hugh Herbert John "Robbie" Robson (2 November 1918 – 17 April 1996) was a New Zealand lawn bowls player.

At the 1962 British Empire and Commonwealth Games in Perth, Western Australia, he won the men's pairs gold medal partnering Bob McDonald. Eight years later he won the silver medal again with McDonald in the pairs at the 1970 Commonwealth Games.

A member of the Tokoroa Bowling Club, Robson won the New Zealand national fours title in 1956 and the singles title in 1974.

Robson died in Hamilton on 17 April 1996.
