= Bob McDonald (bowls) =

New Zealand lawn bowls player

Bob McDonald QSM
Personal information
- Born: Robert Lang McDonald; 21 April 1933
- Died: 22 February 2006 (aged 72) Auckland, New Zealand

Sport
- Sport: Lawn bowls
- Club: Onehunga BC
Medal record
Men's lawn bowls
Representing New Zealand
British Empire and Commonwealth Games
Gold medal – first place	1962 Perth	Pairs
Silver medal – second place	1970 Edinburgh	Pairs
Bronze medal – third place	1974 Christchurch	Pairs

Robert Lang McDonald QSM (21 April 1933 – 22 February 2006) was a New Zealand lawn bowls player who competed at four Commonwealth Games, winning gold, silver and bronze medals in the men's pairs.

== Bowls career ==
At the 1962 British Empire and Commonwealth Games in Perth, Western Australia, he won the men's pairs gold medal partnering Robbie Robson. Eight years later he won the silver medal again with Robson in the pairs at the 1970 Commonwealth Games. In 1974 he claimed his last Commonwealth Games medal with a bronze in the men's pairs. He also competed in the 1978 Commonwealth Games.

In addition to international success McDonald won the 1962 pairs title with Frank Livingstone and the 1973 fours title at the Australian National Bowls Championships when bowling for the Onehunga Bowls Club.

== Honours and awards ==
McDonald was awarded the Queen's Service Medal for community service in the 2002 New Year Honours. He died in Auckland on 22 February 2006.

In 2013, McDonald was an inaugural inductee into the Bowls New Zealand Hall of Fame.
