= Mike Breckin =

British fencer (born 1946)

Personal information
- Born: 16 May 1946 (age 80) Beckenham, London, England

Sport
- Sport: Fencing
Medal record
Fencing
Representing England
British Commonwealth Games
Gold medal – first place	1970 Edinburgh	foil individual
Gold medal – first place	1970 Edinburgh	foil team

John Michael Breckin (born 16 May 1946) better known as Mike Breckin is a retired British international fencer.

== Fencing career ==
He competed in the individual and team foil events at the 1968 and 1972 Summer Olympics.

In 1969, he won the foil title at the British Fencing Championships. The following year in 1970, he represented England and won double gold in the foil team and individual events, at the 1970 British Commonwealth Games in Edinburgh, Scotland.
