= Graham Paul =

British fencer (born 1947)

Personal information
- Nationality: British (English)
- Born: 15 May 1947 (age 79) St. Neots, Cambridgeshire, England
- Height: 185 cm (6 ft 1 in)
- Weight: 82 kg (181 lb)

Sport
- Sport: Fencing
- Event: foil
- Club: Salle Paul Fencing Club
Medal record
Fencing
Representing England
British Empire & Commonwealth Games
Gold medal – first place	1966 Kingston	team foil
Bronze medal – third place	1966 Kingston	individual foil
Gold medal – first place	1970 Edinburgh	team foil
Bronze medal – third place	1970 Edinburgh	individual foil

Graham René Paul (born 15 May 1947) is a retired British international fencer.

== Biography ==
Paul competed at the 1968, 1972, 1976, and 1984 Summer Olympics.

Paul represented the England team at the 1966 British Empire and Commonwealth Games in Kingston, Jamaica. He participated in the foil events and won a gold medal in the team foil with Bill Hoskyns and Allan Jay, in addition to winning individual bronze.

Four years later he repeated the success by winning another gold and bronze at the 1970 British Commonwealth Games in Edinburgh, Scotland.

He was a six times British fencing champion, winning four foil titles and two épée titles at the British Fencing Championships, from 1966 to 1973. Additionally he has been British Veterans Foil champion seven times.

== Personal life ==
He is part of a famous fencing and athletics family; parents René Paul and June Foulds, brother Barry Paul, uncle Raymond Paul and cousin Steven Paul.
