= Sue Green (fencer) =

British fencer (born 1950)

Personal information
- Nationality: British (English)
- Born: Susan Green; 26 June 1950 (age 76) Flixton, Lancashire, England
- Height: 157 cm (5 ft 2 in)
- Weight: 54 kg (119 lb)

Sport
- Sport: Fencing
- Event: Foil
- Club: Ashton FC, London Polytechnic FC, St Pauls FC

Achievements and titles
- Olympic finals: Mexico 68, Munich 72, Montreal 76
- World finals: 1970 Ankara/71 Vienna/73 Gottenberg/74 Grenoble/75 Hungary
Medal record
Fencing
Representing England
British Commonwealth Games
Gold medal – first place	1970 Edinburgh	foil team

Susan Green (born 26 June 1950) is a retired British international fencer who competed at the 1968, 1972 and 1976 Summer Olympics.

== Biography ==
Green started fencing in 1965 and in 1966 she won the World Youth Championships at Crystal Palace. In 1968 she won the U23 foil title and the senior title at the British Fencing Championships.

She also represented England in the team foil event, at the 1970 British Commonwealth Games in Edinburgh, Scotland, winning a gold medal.

Green won the Deprez Trophy (3 times) and the de Beaumont International (2 times) and in 1971 she became a coach at the newly formed Rochdale Fencing Club.
