= Marion Exelby =

Australian fencer

Personal information
- Born: 6 November 1951 (age 74)

Sport
- Sport: Fencing
Medal record
Fencing
Representing Australia
Commonwealth Games
Silver medal – second place	1970 Edinburgh	Women's Foil

Marion Exelby (born 6 November 1951) is an Australian fencer. She competed in the women's individual foil event at the 1972 Summer Olympics.
