= David Acfield =

English cricketer and fencer

- Born: 24 July 1947 (age 79); Chelmsford, Essex, England
- Height: 5 ft 9 in (175 cm)
- Cricket career

Cricket information
- Batting: Right-handed
- Bowling: Right-arm off-break

Domestic team information
- Years: Team
- 1966–1972: Cambridge University
- 1966–1986: Essex

Career statistics
Competition	First-class	List A
Matches	420	160
Runs scored	1,677	104
Batting average	8.18	5.77
100s/50s	0/0	0/0
Top score	42	9*
Balls bowled	67,660	6,419
Wickets	950	152
Bowling average	28.21	27.25
5 wickets in innings	34	2
10 wickets in match	4	0
Best bowling	8/55	5/14
Catches/stumpings	138/–	27/–
- Source: CricketArchive, 25 June 2021
- Fencing career
- Sport: Fencing
- Country: United Kingdom, England
- Hand: Right
- Retired: 1972
Medal record
Fencing
Representing England
British Commonwealth Games
Gold medal – first place	1970 Edinburgh	team sabre

David Laurence Acfield (born 24 July 1947) is an English former first-class cricketer who was also a champion fencer.

== Cricket career ==
He was part of the successful Essex County Cricket Club team of the late 1970s and early 1980s and formed a noted county spin partnership with Ray East. He was a right-arm off break bowler and right-handed tail-end batsman. He played for Cambridge University from 1966 to 1968 and Essex from 1966 to 1986. He also appeared for MCC in 1973–74 and 1974. He was awarded his Essex cap in 1970 and had his Essex benefit season in 1981.

He took 10 wickets in a match 4 times and 5 wickets in an innings 34 times. His best first-class figures, 8 for 55, came against Kent. Acfield was no batsman, failing to score a first-class fifty in 417 innings. His best score, 42, came against Leicestershire. His lack of batting ability, and strong competition from the likes of Fred Titmus and John Emburey, told against his chances of Test selection, although he was on the 'long list' for inclusion in the English team that toured West Indies in 1973.

After retiring he remained in the game and served on the ECB's management committee.

== Fencing career ==
Acfield was also an Olympic fencer, taking part in the 1968 and 1972 Games.

He represented England and won a gold medal in the team sabre at the 1970 British Commonwealth Games in Edinburgh.

Acfield was a four times British fencing champion, winning the sabre title at the British Fencing Championships for four years in a row, 1969–1972, during which period he was the leading sabre fencer in the country. He retired from fencing after the 1972 Olympics, preferring to devote himself to cricket as a professional, having previously retained his amateur status to protect his Olympic qualification.

== Personal life ==
Acfield attended Brentwood School, and graduated in history from Christ's College, Cambridge. For many years, during his cricket career, he taught history and took nets in winter at Rainsford Comprehensive School, later renamed St Peter's College, Chelmsford.

After his retirement from athletics, Acfield served as an administrator for the England and Wales Cricket Board and later as the president of the Essex County Cricket Club. He is also a Trustee of the Hornsby Professional Cricketers' Fund charity.
