= John Higgins (bowls) =

Irish international lawn and indoor bowler

Personal information
- Nationality: british (Northern Irish)
- Born: 9 September 1940 Belfast, Northern Ireland
- Died: 2 May 2012 (aged 71) Belfast
- Occupation: Green keeper
- Employer: Cave Hill BC / Salisbury BC

Sport
- Sport: Lawn bowls
- League: N. I. B. A
- Club: York Road Civil Defence BC / 58th Old Boys Bowling Club
Medal record
Representing combined Ireland
World Outdoor Championships
Bronze medal – third place	1976 Johannesburg	triples
Commonwealth Games
Bronze medal – third place	1970 Edinburgh	fours
British Isles Championships
Gold medal – first place	1978	triples

John Stewart Higgins (1940–2012) was an Irish international lawn and indoor bowler.

== Biography ==
He started bowling aged 15 and won a bronze medal in the triples at the 1976 World Outdoor Bowls Championship in Johannesburg. He also won a bronze medal in fours at the 1970 British Commonwealth Games in Edinburgh.

He won the 1969 Irish National Bowls Championships singles. Higgins participated at the 1980 World Outdoor Bowls Championship for Ireland.

Higgins plied his trade with YRCD bowling club through most of his career before joining the 58th Old Boys Bowling Club after YRCD's demise. Since his passing the YRCD Hall as it is known has been renovated and also incorporates the HUBB Community Resource Centre, where a mural proudly stands of John playing bowls for his club.
