= 1982 New Zealand eight =

The 1982 New Zealand eight was a double world champion team of rowers. The team won some significant awards for its successes.

== Background ==
In the 1981 World Rowing Championships at Oberschleißheim outside Munich, Germany, the New Zealand eight came seventh. The crew changed significantly prior to the 1982 World Rowing Championships at Rotsee in Lucerne, Switzerland, with four of the rowers and the coxswain replaced.

== World championships ==
The team that rowed at the 1982 World Rowing Championships was made up as follows:

- Les O'Connell (bow)
- Mike Stanley (seat 2)
- Andrew Stevenson (seat 3)
- George Keys (seat 4)
- Roger White-Parsons (seat 5)
- Chris White (seat 6)
- Tony Brook (seat 7)
- Dave Rodger (stroke)
- Andy Hay (cox)

The New Zealand team beat East Germany and the Soviet Union to second and third place, respectively. The team was coached by Harry Mahon.

Two of the team members were substituted for the 1983 World Rowing Championships at Wedau in Duisburg, Germany, with Brook and O'Connell replaced by Barrie Mabbott and Nigel Atherfold. The New Zealand eight defended its world title, with East Germany coming second, and Australia in third place.

Many of the team went on to compete at the 1984 Summer Olympics, where there was a great expectation for them to win gold. The team came fourth in the Olympics, and their preparations for, and then competition at, the Olympics was turned into a documentary.

== Awards ==
At the 1982 Halberg Awards, the New Zealand eight was crowned "Sportsman of the Year". The 1982 team was inducted into the New Zealand Sports Hall of Fame in 1995.

== See also ==
- 1972 New Zealand eight

Awards
Preceded by Allison Roe	New Zealand Sportsman of the Year; 1982	Succeeded by Chris Lewis
