= Rowing New Zealand =

Sports governing body in New Zealand

- Sport: Rowing
- Founded: 1887
- Affiliation: International Rowing Federation

Official website
- www.rowingnz.com
- (New Zealand)

Rowing New Zealand is the sports governing body for rowing in New Zealand. Its purpose is to provide leadership and support to enable an environment of success for the New Zealand rowing community. This includes secondary schools, clubs, masters, universities and high performance.

Rowing New Zealand was founded as the New Zealand Amateur Rowing Association on 16 March 1887. The New Zealand Amateur Rowing Association was formed by nine clubs in an effort to coordinate and regulate the sport of amateur rowing in New Zealand.

Since the turn of the 21st century, Rowing New Zealand has had moderate success on the water, which has resulted in increased media interest in the sport of rowing and record participation at secondary school level. The aim is eventually to replicate the success of Great Britain and Australia on the water by the 2020 Olympics. This increase in the number of active rowers has been attributed in particular to Rob Waddell's gold medal victory at the 2000 Summer Olympics in Sydney. There have also been increases, particularly in the number of women rowers, since Georgina Evers-Swindell and Caroline Evers-Swindell won gold at the 2004 Athens Olympic Games.

The 2008 Olympic trials gained intense public and media interest as previous Olympic champion Rob Waddell challenged current world champion Mahé Drysdale for the sole men’s single sculls spot. In the final race, Waddell suffered a repeat of his atrial fibrillation condition, resulting in Drysdale claiming the victory and the sole 2008 Olympic single sculls spot.

Waddell was then selected into the double sculls with the young Nathan Cohen, world champion at the 2006 World University Games in single sculls, in early 2008. At the 2008 Summer Olympics in Shunyi Olympic Rowing-Canoeing Park, Shunyi, Beijing in August 2008, the two finished fourth in the double sculls final.

Cohen won the gold medal in double sculls at the next Olympic Games in 2012, with rowing partner Joseph Sullivan.

Cohen and Sullivan also won the World Championship in both 2010 and 2011.

== Membership ==
Sixty-eight clubs are affiliated to Rowing New Zealand. Clubs within New Zealand are affiliated to their regional rowing associations, which include the Auckland, Bay of Plenty, Canterbury, East Coast, Marlborough, Otago, Southland, Waikato, Whanganui and Wellington Rowing Associations.

Other members affiliated with Rowing New Zealand include the New Zealand Secondary Schools Rowing Association (NZSSRA), the New Zealand Universities Rowing Council, the New Zealand Rowing Race Officials Association, Regional Performance Centres (RPCs), Karapiro Rowing and Ruataniwha Rowing. RPCs provide a pathway for rowers to compete for selection in national representative crews as well as providing a high performance training environment for rowers. Karapiro Rowing and Ruataniwha Rowing operate and maintain the country's two main rowing venues: Lake Karapiro near Cambridge in the North Island, and Lake Ruataniwha near Twizel in the South Island.

== Events ==
- National Club Championships – First held in 1888 and only fours and single sculls competed. Now it is held alternatively at Lake Karapiro, Cambridge, and Lake Ruataniwha, Twizel. The event is now held over 5 days and more than 60 events are raced.
- Masters Championships – These are held annually and a rower may compete as a masters rower from the beginning of the year during which he or she reaches the age of 27.
- New Zealand University Championships – Are held annually and the top prizes include The Ashes (Overall NZU Rowing Champs Winners), the Tamaki Cup (Championship Women's Eight), the Paul Griffiths Cup (Championship Women's Four), and the Hebberley Shield (Championship Men's Eight).
- New Zealand Secondary School Championships (Maadi Cup) – The regatta is the largest school sports event in New Zealand and is held alternatively at Lake Karapiro, Cambridge, and Lake Ruataniwha, Twizel. 'Maadi Cup' is the name given to the regatta and the cup for the New Zealand Secondary Schools Boys' Under 18 Rowing Eights which is raced at the regatta. The top prizes at the regatta are the Maadi Cup, Springbok Shield, Levin Jubilee Cup, Dawn Cup and Star Trophy.

== National teams ==
Rowing New Zealand selects Elite, Development, Under 23, Under 21, Junior and Under 18 National Teams through selection camps and trials process. The Elite National Team represents New Zealand at the highest level of competition, either at the Olympic Games, World Championships or the Rowing World Cup. While the Olympics are held once every four years, the World Championships are held every year. The Rowing World Cup comprises 3 regattas held each year and overall winners are determined by points that are awarded to the top finishing boats at each event.

The Under 23 National Team competes at the Under 23 World Championship regatta each year while the Under 21 National Team competes at the Youth Cup Regatta in Australia. The Junior National Team competes at the Junior World Championships each year and the Under 18 crews from the North Island and the South Island are selected annually to compete against one another.

== Results ==
=== 2010 World Championship Regatta ===
Rowing New Zealand hosted the 2010 World Championship Regatta at Lake Karapiro, 12–19 September. New Zealand secured the rights to hold the 39th World Rowing Championship in 2006 and, in doing so, became one of only a handful of world rowing nations that have held more than one championship. At the official Closing Ceremony, FISA President Denis Oswald said: "I praise the Organising Committee for having staged such an outstanding event and I include all members of the Organising Committee and volunteers who have been so helpful and friendly to us. It won't take 32 years until we come back. Karapiro 2010 brought the World Championships to new standards and set a new model."

The first time the event came to New Zealand was in 1978. The 2010 event joins the 1978 event as being considered by many of the rowing community worldwide as being amongst the greatest ever world championships.

=== 2005 World Championship Regatta ===
The 2005 World Championship Regatta was one of the most successful event for Rowing New Zealand and New Zealand sport when four gold medals were won within 45 minutes, making New Zealand the most successful country at the regatta. The four victories were:

- Mahé Drysdale in the men's single sculls.
- Juliette Haigh and Nicky Coles in the women's coxless pair.
- George Bridgewater and Nathan Twaddle in the men's coxless pair.
- Caroline Evers-Swindell and Georgina Evers-Swindell in the women's double sculls.

== Olympic medallists ==
Medal	Olympics	Event	Crew members
Bronze	1920 Antwerp	Men's Single Sculls	Darcy Hadfield
Silver	1932 Los Angeles	Men's Coxless pair	Cyril Stiles; Rangi Thompson
Gold	1968 Mexico	Men's coxed Four	Dick Joyce; Dudley Storey; Ross Collinge; Warren Cole; Simon Dickie
Gold	1972 Munich	Men's Eight	Tony Hurt; Wybo Veldman; Dick Joyce; John Hunter; Lindsay Wilson; Joe Earl; Trevor Coker; Gary Robertson; Simon Dickie
Silver	1972 Munich	Men's coxless Four	Dick Tonks; Dudley Storey; Ross Collinge; Noel Mills
Bronze	1976 Montreal	Men's Eight	Ivan Sutherland; Trevor Coker; Peter Dignan; Lindsay Wilson; Joe Earl; Dave Rodger; Alec McLean; Tony Hurt; Simon Dickie
Gold	1984 Los Angeles	Men's coxless Four	Les O'Connell; Shane O'Brien; Conrad Robertson; Keith Trask
Bronze	1984 Los Angeles	Men's coxed Four	Kevin Lawton; Don Symon; Barrie Mabbott; Ross Tong; Brett Hollister
Bronze	1988 Seoul	Men's coxed Four	George Keys; Ian Wright; Greg Johnston; Chris White; Andrew Bird
Bronze	1988 Seoul	Women's coxless Pair	Nikki Payne; Lynley Hannen
Bronze	1988 Seoul	Men's Single Sculls	Eric Verdonk
Gold	2000 Sydney	Men's Single Sculls	Rob Waddell
Gold	2004 Athens	Women's Double Sculls	Georgina Evers-Swindell; Caroline Evers-Swindell
Gold	2008 Beijing	Women's double sculls	Georgina Evers-Swindell; Caroline Evers-Swindell
Bronze	2008 Beijing	Men's Single Sculls	Mahé Drysdale
Bronze	2008 Beijing	Men's coxless pair	Nathan Twaddle ; George Bridgewater
Gold	2012 London	Men's double sculls	Nathan Cohen; Joseph Sullivan
Gold	2012 London	Men's coxless pair	Eric Murray ; Hamish Bond
Gold	2012 London	Men's single sculls	Mahé Drysdale
Bronze	2012 London	Men's lightweight double sculls	Storm Uru, Peter Taylor
Bronze	2012 London	Women's coxless pair	Juliette Haigh, Rebecca Scown
Gold	2016 Rio de Janeiro	Men's coxless pair	Hamish Bond, Eric Murray
Gold	2016 Rio de Janeiro	Men's single sculls	Mahé Drysdale
Silver	2016 Rio de Janeiro	Women's coxless pair	Genevieve Behrent, Rebecca Scown
Silver	2020 Tokyo	Women's double sculls	Brooke Donoghue, Hannah Osborne
Gold	2020 Tokyo	Women's coxless pair	Grace Prendergast, Kerri Gowler
Silver	2020 Tokyo	Women's eight	Ella Greenslade, Emma Dyke, Lucy Spoors, Kelsey Bevan, Grace Prendergast, Kerri Gowler, Beth Ross, Jackie Gowler, Caleb Shepherd
Gold	2020 Tokyo	Women's single sculls	Emma Twigg
Gold	2020 Tokyo	Men's eight	Tom Mackintosh, Hamish Bond, Tom Murray, Michael Brake, Dan Williamson, Phillip Wilson, Shaun Kirkham, Matt MacDonald, Sam Bosworth

== World champions ==
World championship regatta	Event	Crew members
1982 - Lucerne, Switzerland	Men's coxed eight	Les O'Connell, Mike Stanley, Andrew Stevenson, George Keys, Roger White-Parsons, Chris White, Tony Brook, Dave Rodger, Andy Hay (cox)
1983 - Wedau, Germany	Men's coxed four	Conrad Robertson, Greg Johnston, Keith Trask, Les O'Connell, Brett Hollister (cox)
1983 - Wedau, Germany	Men's coxed eight	Mike Stanley, Andrew Stevenson, Dave Rodger, Roger White-Parsons, Chris White, Barrie Mabbott, George Keys, Nigel Atherfold, Andy Hay (cox)
1991 - Vienna, Austria	Women's lightweight single sculls	Philippa Baker
1993 - Račice, Czech Republic	Women's double sculls	Philippa Baker, Brenda Lawson
1994 - Indianapolis, USA	Women's double sculls	Philippa Baker, Brenda Lawson
1998 – Cologne, Germany	Men’s single sculls	Rob Waddell
1999 – St Catherine's, Canada	Men’s single sculls	Rob Waddell
2002 – Sevilla, Spain	Women’s double sculls	Georgina Evers-Swindell, Caroline Evers-Swindell
2003 – Milan, Italy	Women’s double sculls	Georgina Evers-Swindell, Caroline Evers-Swindell
2005 – Gifu, Japan	Men's single sculls	Mahé Drysdale
2005 – Gifu, Japan	Women's coxless pair	Juliette Haigh, Nicky Coles
2005 – Gifu, Japan	Men's coxless pair	George Bridgewater, Nathan Twaddle
2005 – Gifu, Japan	Women's double sculls	Georgina Evers-Swindell, Caroline Evers-Swindell
2006 – Eton, England	Men’s single sculls	Mahé Drysdale
2007 – Munich, Germany	Men’s single sculls	Mahé Drysdale
2007 – Munich, Germany	Men’s coxless four	Hamish Bond, Eric Murray, James Dallinger, Carl Meyer
2007 – Munich, Germany	Men’s lightweight single sculls	Duncan Grant
2008 – Linz, Austria	Men’s lightweight single sculls	Duncan Grant
2009 – Poznan, Poland	Men’s single sculls	Mahé Drysdale
2009 – Poznan, Poland	Men’s lightweight single sculls	Duncan Grant
2009 – Poznan, Poland	Men’s lightweight double sculls	Peter Taylor, Storm Uru
2009 – Poznan, Poland	Men's coxless pair	Eric Murray, Hamish Bond
2010 – Lake Karapiro, New Zealand	Men’s double sculls	Nathan Cohen, Joseph Sullivan
2010 – Lake Karapiro, New Zealand	Men's coxless pair	Eric Murray, Hamish Bond
2010 – Lake Karapiro, New Zealand	Women's coxless pair	Juliette Haigh, Rebecca Scown
2011 – Bled, Slovenia	Men’s single Sculls	Mahé Drysdale
2011 – Bled, Slovenia	Men’s double sculls	Nathan Cohen, Joseph Sullivan
2011 – Bled, Slovenia	Men's coxless pair	Eric Murray, Hamish Bond
2011 – Bled, Slovenia	Women's coxless pair	Juliette Haigh, Rebecca Scown
2013 - Chungju, South Korea	Men's coxless pair	Eric Murray, Hamish Bond
2014 - Amsterdam, Netherlands	Men's coxless pair	Eric Murray, Hamish Bond
2014 - Amsterdam, Netherlands	Men's coxed pair	Eric Murray, Hamish Bond, Caleb Shepherd
2014 - Amsterdam, Netherlands	Women’s single sculls	Emma Twigg
2014 - Amsterdam, Netherlands	Women’s double sculls	Fiona Bourke, Zoe Stevenson
2014 - Amsterdam, Netherlands	Women's coxless four	Kayla Pratt, Kelsey Bevan, Grace Prendergast, Kerri Gowler
2014 - Amsterdam, Netherlands	Women’s lightweight double sculls	Sophie MacKenzie, Julia Edwards
2015 - Aiguebelette, France	Men's coxless pair	Eric Murray, Hamish Bond
2015 - Aiguebelette, France	Men's lightweight single sculls	Adam Ling
2015 - Aiguebelette, France	Women’s double sculls	Eve MacFarlane, Zoe Stevenson
2015 - Aiguebelette, France	Women’s lightweight single sculls	Zoe McBride
2015 - Aiguebelette, France	Women’s lightweight double sculls	Sophie MacKenzie, Julia Edwards
2016 - Rotterdam, Netherlands	Women’s lightweight single sculls	Zoe McBride
2017 - Sarasota, USA	Men’s double sculls	John Storey, Chris Harris
2017 - Sarasota, USA	Women’s double sculls	Brooke Donoghue, Olivia Loe
2017 - Sarasota, USA	Women's coxless pair	Grace Prendergast, Kerri Gowler
2019 - Ottensheim, Austria	Women’s double sculls	Brooke Donoghue, Olivia Loe
2019 - Ottensheim, Austria	Women's coxless pair	Grace Prendergast, Kerri Gowler
2019 - Ottensheim, Austria	Women’s coxed eight	Ella Greenslade, Emma Dyke, Lucy Spoors, Kelsey Bevan, Grace Prendergast, Kerri Gowler, Elizabeth Ross, Jackie Gowler, Caleb Shepherd
2022 - Racice, Czech Republic	Women's Pair	Grace Prendergast, Kerri Williams (nee Gowler)
