= Andrew Stevenson (rower) =

New Zealand rower (born 1957)

Herb Stevenson
Personal information
- Born: Andrew Stevenson; 7 December 1957 (age 68)

Sport
- Sport: Rowing
Medal record
Men's rowing
Representing New Zealand
World Rowing Championships
| Gold medal – first place | 1982 Rotsee | Eight |
| Gold medal – first place | 1983 Wedau | Eight |
Commonwealth Games
| Silver medal – second place | 1986 Edinburgh | Coxless four |
| Bronze medal – third place | 1986 Edinburgh | Eight |

Andrew Stevenson (born 7 December 1957), also known as Herb Stevenson, is a former New Zealand rower.

At the 1982 World Rowing Championships at Rotsee, Switzerland, he won a gold medal with the New Zealand eight in the 7 seat. At the 1983 World Rowing Championships at Wedau in Duisburg, Germany, he won a gold medal with the New Zealand eight in the 7 seat.

In 1982, the 1982 rowing eight crew was named sportsman of the year. The 1982 team was inducted into the New Zealand Sports Hall of Fame in 1995. He was 4th in the Eight final at the 1984 Los Angeles Olympics. In 1986 he won a silver medal in the coxless four at the Commonwealth Games in Edinburgh in a boat with Shane O'Brien, Neil Gibson, and Don Symon. He also won a bronze medal with the men's eight.

Awards
| Preceded by Allison Roe | New Zealand Sportsman of the Year; 1982; With: Tony Brook, George Keys, Les O'Connell, Dave Rodger, Mike Stanley, Chris White, Roger White-Parsons, Andy Hay | Succeeded by Chris Lewis |
