= Mike Stanley (rower) =

New Zealand rower

Mike Stanley CNZM
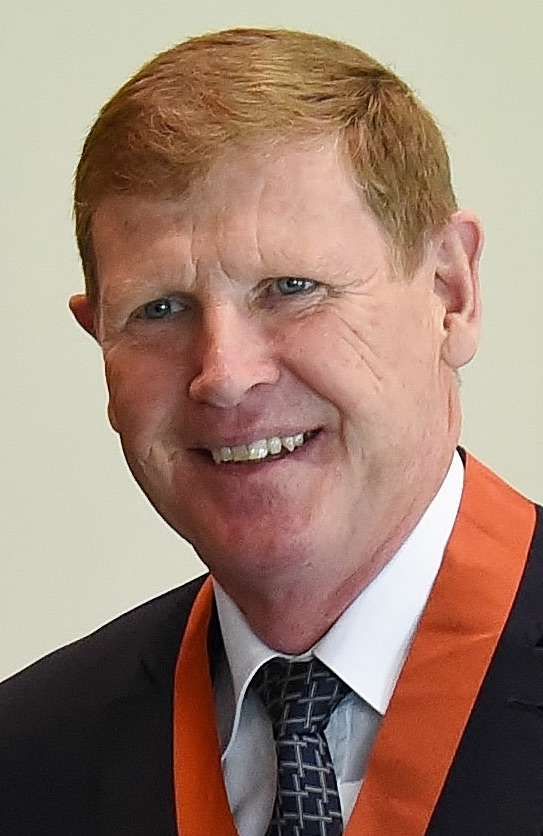
- Stanley in 2017

Personal information
- Full name: Michael Rowland Stanley
- Born: 6 November 1957 (age 69) Lower Hutt, New Zealand

Sport
- Country: New Zealand
- Sport: Rowing
Medal record
Men's rowing
Representing New Zealand
World Championships
Gold medal – first place	1982 Rotsee	Eight
Gold medal – first place	1983 Wedau	Eight

Michael Rowland Stanley CNZM (born 6 November 1957) is a New Zealand sports administrator and former representative rower. He was a two-time world champion and represented New Zealand at the 1984 Los Angeles Olympics. Stanley served as president of the New Zealand Olympic Committee from 2009 to 2022.

== Early life ==
Stanley was born in 1957 in Lower Hutt. His father, Bernard Stanley (1924–2025), was a cross-country runner who placed third in the 1946 national championship. From 1971 to 1975, Stanley was educated at Westlake Boys High School, where he captained the 1st XV rugby union team for three years, and was a member of the school's senior rowing eight in 1974 and 1975.

== Rowing career ==
Stanley was selected in the New Zealand coxed four for the 1980 Moscow Olympics, but did not attend the games due to the boycott. At the 1981 World Rowing Championships at Oberschleißheim in Germany, he was a member of the New Zealand eight, winning the B final.

At the 1982 World Rowing Championships at Rotsee, Switzerland, Stanley won a gold medal rowing in seat 2 with the New Zealand eight. The 1982 rowing eight crew won the 1982 Sportsman of the Year award and was inducted into the New Zealand Sports Hall of Fame in 1995.

At the 1983 World Rowing Championships at Wedau in Duisburg, Germany, Stanley won a gold medal with the New Zealand eight in the stroke seat. At the 1984 Los Angeles Olympics, he was a member of the New Zealand eight that came fourth. He retired from competitive rowing after the 1984 Olympic Games.

== Later career ==
From 1988 to 1994, Stanley was sports master at Westlake Boys High School. He coached the school's rowing team, and the Westlake boat won the Springbok Shield in 1989 and 1991, and finished second in the Maadi Cup in both those years. He returned to the school in 2004 as a rowing coach. Stanley was chief executive of Rowing New Zealand from 1994 to 2003. He remained on the board of the organisation until 2009. From 2005, he was a member of the New Zealand Olympic Committee, and between 2009 and 2022 he was president of the organisation, succeeding Eion Edgar.

In the 2017 New Year Honours, Stanley was appointed a Companion of the New Zealand Order of Merit, for services to sport.

== Family ==
Stanley is married to Jane, and they have three children.

Awards
Preceded by Allison Roe	New Zealand Sportsman of the Year; 1982; With: Tony Brook, George Keys, Les O'Connell, Dave Rodger, Andrew Stevenson, Chris White, Roger White-Parsons, Andy Hay	Succeeded by Chris Lewis
Civic offices
Preceded by Eion Edgar	President of the New Zealand Olympic Committee; 2009–2022	Succeeded by Liz Dawson
