= Dave Rodger =

New Zealand rower

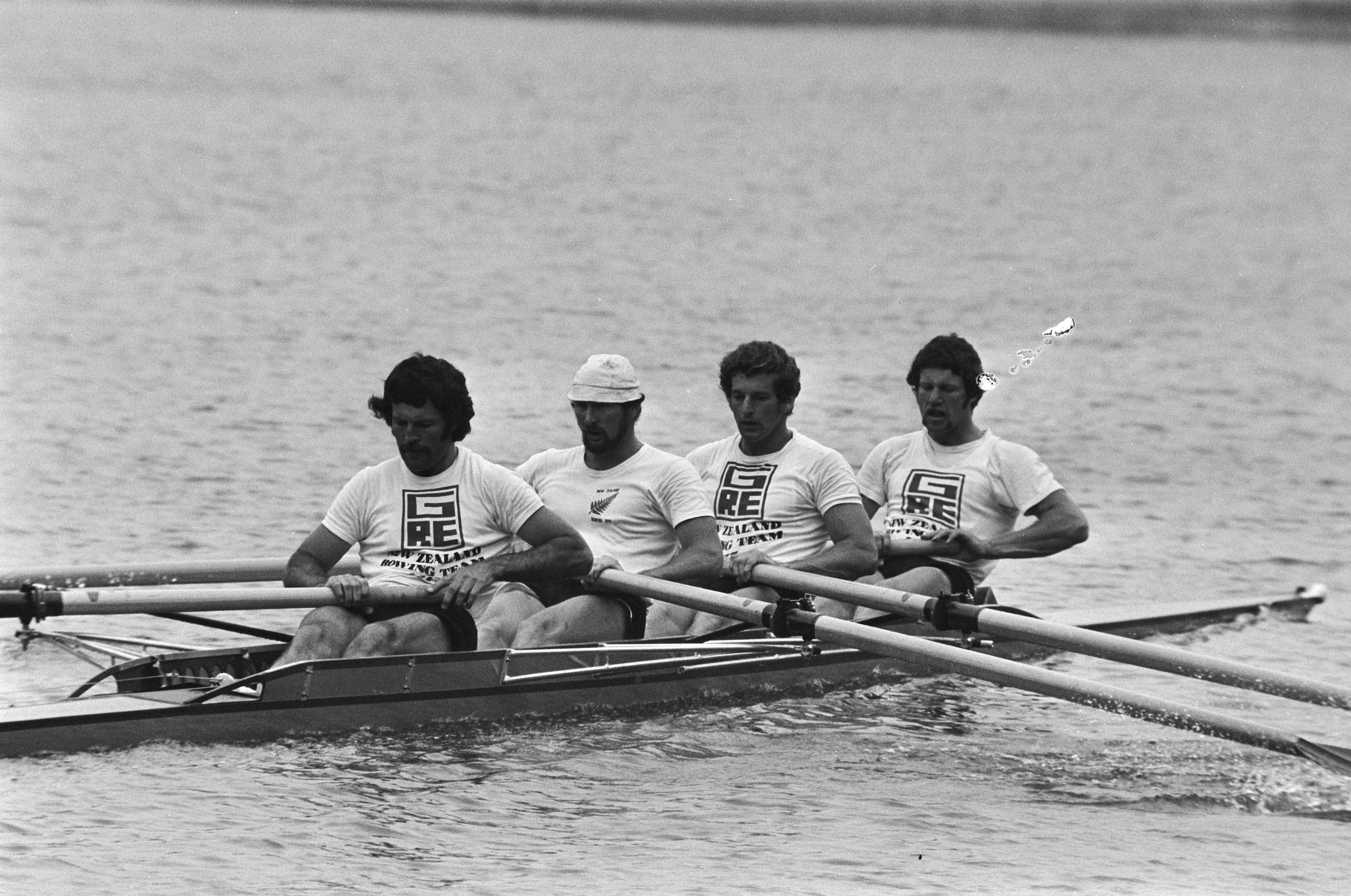
- 1977 New Zealand coxless four on the Bosbaan rowing lake in Amsterdam

Personal information
- Born: David Marsden Rodger; 18 June 1955 (age 71) Hamilton, New Zealand
- Spouse: Dianne Rodger

Sport
- Sport: Rowing
Medal record
Men's rowing
Representing New Zealand
Olympic Games
Bronze medal – third place	1976 Montreal	Eight
World Championships
Gold medal – first place	1982 Rotsee	Eight
Gold medal – first place	1983 Wedau	Eight
Silver medal – second place	1977 Amsterdam	Four
Bronze medal – third place	1974 Lucerne	Eight
Bronze medal – third place	1975 Nottingham	Eight
Bronze medal – third place	1978 Karapiro	Eight

David Marsden Rodger (born 18 June 1955) is a former New Zealand rower who won an Olympic bronze medal.

Rodger was born in Hamilton, New Zealand. Rodger was first selected to represent New Zealand in New Zealand Rowing's first Junior eight crew in 1973 with team members David Symmons, Peter Dignan, Ross Lindstrom, Graham Hamilton, Peter Rowbotham, Graham Hill, Greg Ball and Frank Sheehan finishing fifth at Nottingham, England. He then represented New Zealand in the u23 class of a tour of Australia winning all races. 1974 saw his first foray at elite level in the NZ eight finishing third at the Lucerne World Rowing Championships in Switzerland. He rowed in the same boat class in the 1975 World Rowing Championships in Nottingham, Great Britain, and won a bronze medal. At the 1976 Summer Olympics in Montreal he was a member of the eight along with Tony Hurt, Ivan Sutherland, Trevor Coker, Peter Dignan, Lindsay Wilson, Joe Earl and Alec McLean and Simon Dickie (cox).

The 1977 World Rowing Championships saw Rodger secure second spot in the coxless four with Ivan Sutherland, David Lindstrom and Des Lock under new coach Harry Mahon. 1978 saw another third in the men's eight at his home course of Lake Karapiro, New Zealand. 1979 was a compulsory rest and marriage to Dianne Zorn, a leading New Zealand athlete. Rodger was selected for the coxed four to compete at the 1980 Summer Olympics in Moscow but did not go due to the Olympics boycott. 1981 saw Rodger gain a seat back in the elite men's eight as stroke but also saw Rodger for the first time relinquish a top three spot as he'd scored in previous world championships. However, the next year with Rodger in the six seat saw the NZ eight catapult from seventh in 1981 to world champions in 1982 and 1983. At the 1982 World Rowing Championships at Rotsee, Switzerland, he was the stroke. At the 1983 World Rowing Championships at Wedau in Duisburg, Germany, he was in seat three.

At the 1984 Summer Olympics in Los Angeles he was a member of the eight which finished fourth. His wife competed in the women's 3000 metres, and that year they were the first husband and wife to compete for New Zealand at the same Olympic Games. After the disappointment of a fourth place at the Olympic Games, Rodger continued a further year in the eight in 1985 only to come fourth again, this time in the two seat. Some believe that if Rodger had been in the six seat in both the Olympic eight and the 1985 eight the crew results could have been more golden but of that is now speculation or part of the rowing story time. The resulting fourth and continued placement in the two seat saw Rodger retire from rowing and join the 1987 America's Cup in Fremantle, Western Australia. Rodger enjoyed being part of a group of people who built and sailed the first fibreglass 12 metre yacht (KZ3) in the 12 metre world championships finishing fifth as a grinder and the first of five rowers to join the America's cup and Team New Zealand at a later stage.

In 1982, the 1982 rowing eight crew was named sportsman of the year. The 1982 team was inducted into the New Zealand Sports Hall of Fame in 1995.

Awards
Preceded by Allison Roe	New Zealand Sportsman of the Year; 1982; With: Tony Brook, George Keys, Les O'Connell, Mike Stanley, Andrew Stevenson, Chris White, Roger White-Parsons, Andy Hay	Succeeded by Chris Lewis
