= Chris White (rower) =

New Zealand rower (born 1960)

Chris White MNZM
Personal information
- Born: Christopher Sherratt White; 9 September 1960 (age 65) Gisborne, New Zealand
- Height: 190 cm (6 ft 3 in)
- Weight: 94 kg (207 lb)

Sport
- Country: New Zealand
- Sport: Rowing
Medal record
Representing New Zealand
Olympic Games
Bronze medal – third place	1988 Seoul	Coxed four
World Championships
Gold medal – first place	1982 Rotsee	Eight
Gold medal – first place	1983 Wedau	Eight
Silver medal – second place	1986 Nottingham	Coxed four
Silver medal – second place	1995 Tampere	Coxed four
Commonwealth Games
Silver medal – second place	1986 Edinburgh	Coxed four

Christopher Sherratt White MNZM (born 9 September 1960) is a former New Zealand rower and Olympic Bronze medallist at the 1988 Summer Olympics in Seoul. He is described as "one of the giants of New Zealand rowing" and with 38 national titles, holds the record for most domestic rowing titles in New Zealand.

== Life ==
White was born on 9 September 1960 in Gisborne, New Zealand. Richard White, an All Black, was his father. He was a member of the Waikato Rowing Club and in the 1980/81 rowing season, he became national champion in the coxed pairs, pairing with Greg Johnston and Noel Parris as cox. He first represented New Zealand at the 1981 World Rowing Championships in Oberschleißheim outside of Munich, Germany, where he rowed with the eight. With the New Zealand eight, he won world championships in 1982 and 1983 at Rotsee, Switzerland and at Wedau, Germany, respectively.

White competed at the 1984 Olympics in Los Angeles in the eights which finished fourth. At the 1988 Olympics, White won Bronze in the coxed four along with George Keys, Greg Johnston, Ian Wright and Andrew Bird (cox). At the 1992 Olympics in Barcelona and the 1996 Olympics in Atlanta in the coxless four, he finished fourth and thirteenth, respectively.

In 1986 he won Silver medals in the coxed four at both the Commonwealth Games in Edinburgh the World Rowing Championships in Nottingham. At the 1995 World Rowing Championships in Tampere, Finland, White won a Silver medal in the coxed four, with Murdoch Dryden, Andrew Matheson, Chris McAsey, and Michael Whittaker as cox. White has won a total of 38 National Rowing titles, easily the most in New Zealand. He was on the athletes' support staff for the 2002 Commonwealth Games in Manchester and has been on the New Zealand Olympic Committee’s athletes commission for eight years. He is also the manager of Olympic and World Champion rowers Caroline and Georgina Evers-Swindell.

In 1982, the 1982 rowing eight crew was named sportsman of the year. The 1982 team was inducted into the New Zealand Sports Hall of Fame in 1995. In the 2000 New Year Honours, White was appointed a Member of the New Zealand Order of Merit, for services to rowing.

Awards
Preceded by Allison Roe	New Zealand Sportsman of the Year; 1982; With: Tony Brook, George Keys, Les O'Connell, Dave Rodger, Mike Stanley, Andrew Stevenson, Roger White-Parsons, Andy Hay	Succeeded by Chris Lewis
Preceded by Stephen Petterson	Lonsdale Cup of the New Zealand Olympic Committee; 1995	Succeeded by Danyon Loader
