= RowPerfect =

Indoor rowing machine

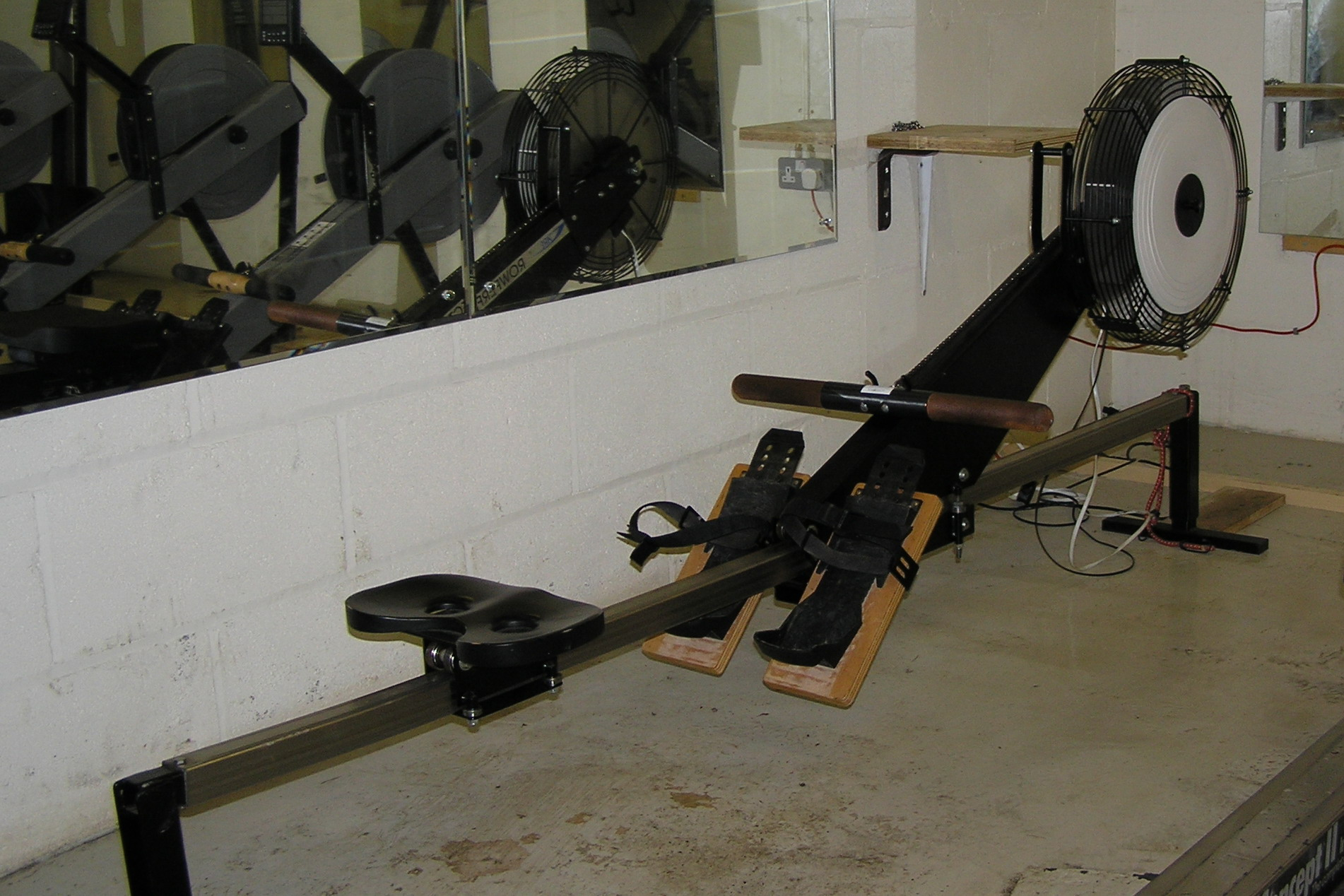
Rowperfect Indoor Rower

The Rowperfect is an indoor rowing machine, designed in 1987 and patented in 1988, by Casper (Cas) Rekers. It is designed to accurately simulate the feeling of rowing on the water. Both the flywheel and the seat are free to move on a slide — this is different from the majority of rowing machines, where the flywheel is fixed and only the seat moves. Its mass and movement are balanced and engineered to enable rowing technique to be learned and refined. This is called a "floating head" rowing simulator: the fixed flywheel type is called a "fixed head" ergometer.

The result is that the flywheel moves towards the rower on the recovery, mimicking the on-water experience of the boat moving under the rower more accurately. The Rowperfect is also unusual in offering a limited tilt seat, which compels the rower to control their weight distribution during the power stroke and recovery. It is considered to be a useful aide to teaching rowing.

== Manufacture ==
Two versions of the successor to the original Rowperfect exist that are made by: Care RP3 in the Netherlands and Rowperfect Pty in Australia. Both versions are able to hook up to dedicated software independently developed and marketed by Row-Ware, including SEAN.

Rowperfect Pty Ltd. bought Rowperfect BV in 2004 moving development and production to Australia, developing the lowered flywheel position of the Indoor Sculler during that process. Rowperfect Pty Ltd holds US Patent 8,608,626 covering the lowered flywheel position on the moving mainframe. After multiple prototypes (the first produced in January 2005) the first Indoor Sculler was produced in June 2008.

The Dutch company produced its rowing machine, the RP3, from June 2009.

Rowperfect Pty Ltd builds the Indoor Sculler, which has a specialised monitor readouts of output power, time, rating, meters distance per stroke, heartrate, power per heartbeat, stroke length. Outputs are calibrated to athlete weight and boat class and give readings aligned to on-water times for skilled athletes. The Indoor Sculler was intensively tested on the domestic market in Australia prior to export to North America, South Africa and Europe.

The Rowperfect Indoor Sculler contains 18 kg of solid stainless steel. The bar, legs and seat base are all solid stainless steel, as are all internal axles and fittings in the moving main frame. By using lightweight materials such as Aluminium and ABS Plastic, the dynamic mainframe of the Indoor Sculler is specifically manufactured to the target weight of 17 kg, replicating the mass per rower (including oars/sculls) of Single, Double and Quad sculling boats as well as the Coxless Pair and the Coxless Four (note: an eight has a 19 kg per-rower mass).

Care RP3 builds the RP3 Computer software shows a force curve, joules, stroke length, stroke rate as well as time, rating, 500 m split and meters. Weight adjusted scores and rowing boat class selection enable coaches to assess likely on-water times for crews based on the computer readouts. Used by Olympic athletes in both sculling and sweep disciplines including Mahé Drysdale, Alan Campbell and crews from US Rowing and New Zealand.

Both machines led rival manufacturers to develop dynamic indoor rowing machines during 2010 leading to a change in perception and adoption.

== Users and coaches ==
Harry Mahon was the first international rowing coach to use Rowperfect widely with his crews. Greg Searle's force curve is illustrated in The Sport of Rowing Book. Further force curves Harry developed for coaches to download and use.

USRowing adopted the RP3 as one of their training tools during Timothy McLaren's tenure as head coach. Since that time, the University of Washington crews have used RP and dominated the Intercollegiate Rowing Association championship regatta. Harvard University rowing crews recently acquired RPs under Charlie Butt's coaching direction.

Other known international users since 2012 include Rowing New Zealand, Dansk Forening for Rosport, Royal Dutch Rowing Federation, British Rowing coach, Robin Williams.
