= George Keys =

New Zealand rower (born 1959)

Personal information
- Born: 12 December 1959 (age 66) Christchurch, New Zealand

Sport
- Sport: Rowing
Medal record
Men's rowing
Representing New Zealand
Olympic Games
Bronze medal – third place	1988 Seoul	Coxed four
World Championships
Gold medal – first place	1982 Rotsee	Eight
Gold medal – first place	1983 Wedau	Eight

George Keys (born 12 December 1959) is a former New Zealand rower who won an Olympic Bronze medal at the 1988 Summer Olympics in Seoul.

Keys was born in 1959 in the Christchurch suburb of Burwood. He was a member of the Avon Rowing Club. At the 1982 World Rowing Championships at Rotsee, Switzerland, he won a gold medal with the New Zealand eight in seat four. At the 1983 World Rowing Championships at Wedau in Duisburg, Germany, he won a gold medal with the New Zealand eight in seat seven. At the 1984 Summer Olympics in Los Angeles Keys competed in the eights which finished fourth. At the 1988 Olympics, he won Bronze in the coxed four along with Ian Wright, Greg Johnston, Chris White and Andrew Bird (cox).

In 1982, the 1982 rowing eight crew was named sportsman of the year. The 1982 team was inducted into the New Zealand Sports Hall of Fame in 1995.

Awards
Preceded by Allison Roe	New Zealand Sportsman of the Year; 1982; With: Tony Brook, Les O'Connell, Dave Rodger, Mike Stanley, Andrew Stevenson, Chris White, Roger White-Parsons, Andy Hay	Succeeded by Chris Lewis
