= Michael Stanley (disambiguation) =

Michael Stanley (1948-2021) was an American singer-songwriter, musician, and radio personality.

Michael or Mike Stanley may also refer to:

- Michael Stanley (rugby union) (born 1989), Samoan rugby union rugby player
- Mike Stanley, American baseball player
- Mike Stanley (rower) (born 1957), New Zealand sports administrator and rower
- Mike Stanley (filmmaker) (born 1963), American director, screenwriter, producer and editor

== See also ==
- Mickey Stanley (born 1942), baseball player
