= Andy Hay (rowing) =

New Zealand rower (born 1964)

Personal information
- Born: Andrew Gerald Ogilvie Hay; 18 February 1964 (age 62) Auckland, New Zealand
- Height: 163 cm (5 ft 4 in)
- Weight: 52 kg (115 lb)

Sport
- Sport: Rowing
Medal record
Men's rowing
Representing New Zealand
Commonwealth Games
Bronze medal – third place	1986 Edinburgh	Eight
World Championships
Gold medal – first place	1982 Rotsee	Eight
Gold medal – first place	1983 Wedau	Eight

Andrew Gerald Ogilvie Hay (born 18 February 1964) is a former New Zealand rowing cox.

At the 1982 World Rowing Championships at Rotsee, Switzerland, he won a gold medal with the New Zealand eight. At the 1983 World Rowing Championships at Wedau in Duisburg, Germany, he won a gold medal with the New Zealand eight. In 1986 he won a bronze medal in the eight at the Commonwealth Games in Edinburgh.

In 1982, the 1982 rowing eight crew was named sportsman of the year. The 1982 team was inducted into the New Zealand Sports Hall of Fame in 1995.

Awards
Preceded by Allison Roe	New Zealand Sportsman of the Year; 1982; With: Tony Brook, George Keys, Les O'Connell, Dave Rodger, Mike Stanley, Andrew Stevenson, Chris White, and Roger White-Parsons	Succeeded by Chris Lewis
