= Roger White-Parsons =

New Zealand rower

Medal record

Men's rowing

Representing New Zealand

World Championships
Gold medal – first place	1982 Rotsee	Eight
Gold medal – first place	1983 Wedau	Eight

Roger White-Parsons (born 16 November 1960) is a former New Zealand rower.

At the 1982 World Rowing Championships at Rotsee, Switzerland, he won a gold medal with the New Zealand eight in seat five. At the 1983 World Rowing Championships at Wedau in Duisburg, Germany, he won a gold medal with the New Zealand eight in seat four.

In 1982, the 1982 rowing eight crew was named sportsman of the year. The 1982 team was inducted into the New Zealand Sports Hall of Fame in 1995.

Awards
Preceded by Allison Roe	New Zealand Sportsman of the Year; 1982; With: Tony Brook, George Keys, Les O'Connell, Dave Rodger, Mike Stanley, Andrew Stevenson, Chris White, Andy Hay	Succeeded by Chris Lewis
