= Sandra Easterbrook =

New Zealand netball player (1946–2019)

Personal information
- Full name: Sandra Anne Easterbrook (née: James)
- Born: 12 March 1946
- Died: 18 November 2019 (aged 73) Whangārei, New Zealand
- Height: 1.78 m (5 ft 10 in)
- Relative: Chris McAsey (son-in-law)

Netball career
- Playing positions: GD, WD
Years	National team	Caps
1967	New Zealand	2
Medal record
Representing New Zealand
World Netball Tournament
Gold medal – first place	1967 Perth	Tournament

Sandra Anne Easterbrook (née James; 12 March 1946 — 18 November 2019) was a New Zealand netball international. She represented her country in the 1967 World Netball Tournament, when New Zealand won the gold medal for the first time.

== Biography ==
Easterbrook was born Sandra Anne James on 12 March 1946, and came from the Northland Region.

Representing Northland at netball, James was selected as the 41st player to represent the New Zealand national team, and played in two matches during the 1967 World Netball Tournament, before a back injury ruled her out of the remainder of the tournament. At 1.78 metres (5 ft 10 in), Easterbrook was the tallest player on the team, and played in the position of wing defence (WD). The New Zealand team won all seven of their games at the tournament, including defeating Australia 40–34 in their final game, to win the world championship title for the first time. The 1967 world championship team was inducted into the New Zealand Sports Hall of Fame in 1996.

James married Roger Easterbrook, and had two daughters and a son. She became a teacher at Kamo Intermediate School in Whangārei, in 1967, staying there until 1976. Her daughter, Suzy, who attended the same school, represented New Zealand at beach volleyball and is now a beach volleyball coach; she is married to rower and America's Cup grinder Chris McAsey.

Easterbrook died on 18 November 2019.
