= Les O'Connell =

New Zealand rower (born 1958)

Personal information
- Born: Leslie James O'Connell; 23 May 1958 (age 68) Timaru, New Zealand
- Height: 193 cm (6 ft 4 in)
- Weight: 89 kg (196 lb)

Sport
- Sport: Rowing
- Club: Avon Rowing Club
Medal record
Representing New Zealand
Men's rowing
Olympic Games
Gold medal – first place	1984 Los Angeles	Coxless four
World Rowing Championships
Gold medal – first place	1982 Rotsee	Eight
Gold medal – first place	1983 Duisburg	Coxed four

Leslie James O'Connell (born 23 May 1958) is a New Zealand former representative rower. He was a two-time world champion and an Olympic champion who won his Olympic gold medal at the 1984 Summer Olympics in Los Angeles in the men's coxless four.

== Early life ==
O'Connell was born in 1958 in Timaru, New Zealand. He grew up in the town and started a carpentry apprenticeship in 1974. Since 1990, he has lived in Christchurch.

== Rowing career ==
O'Connell learned to row on Saltwater Creek in Timaru, and in Timaru Harbour. In 1978, he was New Zealand champion with Chris Booker in the double sculls for the Timaru Rowing Club. He moved to Christchurch in 1990 so that he could train with the Avon Rowing Club, at the time one of the three main rowing clubs in the country.

At the 1982 World Rowing Championships at Rotsee, Switzerland, he won a gold medal with the New Zealand eight seated in the bow. At the end of that year, the 1982 rowing eight crew was named sportsman of the year. O'Connell then changed to a coxed four and at the 1983 World Rowing Championships in Duisburg, Germany, he won gold with Conrad Robertson, Greg Johnston, Keith Trask, and Brett Hollister as cox. He qualified for the 1984 Summer Olympics in Los Angeles and was put in a coxless four (the coxed four is not included as an Olympic event), and teamed with Shane O'Brien, Conrad Robertson, and Keith Trask. Helped by the absence of the Eastern Bloc countries including the favourites from the Soviet Union and East Germany, the New Zealand coxless four won an unexpected gold medal. At the 1985 World Rowing Championships at Hazewinkel in Belgium, he came fourth with the coxless four.

O'Connell won further national championships in 1984 (coxless pair) and 1986 (coxless four).

The 1982 men's eight team was inducted into the New Zealand Sports Hall of Fame in 1995. In 2013, The Timaru Herald had a campaign to have missing sports personalities added to Timaru's Hall of Fame, and O'Connell received the most votes from readers of the newspaper. As of October 2016, O'Connell has not been added to their Hall of Fame.

== Professional career ==
O'Connell registered a construction company in November 1990 and started operating in 1992.

Awards
Preceded by Allison Roe	New Zealand Sportsman of the Year; 1982; With: Tony Brook, George Keys, Dave Rodger, Mike Stanley, Andrew Stevenson, Chris White, Roger White-Parsons, Andy Hay	Succeeded by Chris Lewis
