= Alan Cotter (rowing) =

New Zealand rower

Personal information
- Born: 24 November 1956 (age 69) Ngāruawāhia

Sport
- Sport: Rowing
Medal record
Men's rowing
Representing New Zealand
World Rowing Championships
Bronze medal – third place	1978 Cambridge	Eight
Silver medal – second place	1979 Bled	Eight

Alan Cotter (born 24 November 1956) is a retired New Zealand rowing coxswain. He was the High Performance Director for Rowing New Zealand from 2008 to 2018.

Cotter was born in 1956 in Ngāruawāhia. He won medals with the men's eight at the 1978 (bronze) and 1979 World Rowing Championships (silver). He was selected as cox for the men's eight to compete at the 1980 Moscow Olympics but did not compete due to the Olympics boycott.

Cotter later worked as a rowing coach. This included coaching the men's coxed four who won silver at the 1988 Seoul Olympics. In December 2008, he succeeded Andrew Matheson as High Performance Director for Rowing New Zealand; Matheson had not returned to New Zealand from the 2008 Summer Olympics after receiving an offer from Rowing Australia. He faced funding pressure from High Performance Sport New Zealand after missing the target of five rowing medals at the 2016 Rio Olympics, where only three medals were won. He resigned from Rowing New Zealand in August 2018 over allegations of bullying.
