= Tony Brook =

New Zealand rower

Medal record

Men's rowing

Representing New Zealand

World Rowing Championships
| Gold medal – first place | 1982 Rotsee | Eight |
| Silver medal – second place | 1979 Bled | Eight |

Anthony Brook is a former New Zealand rower.

At the 1982 World Rowing Championships at Rotsee, Switzerland, he won a gold medal with the New Zealand eight in seat seven.

In 1982, the 1982 rowing eight crew was named sportsman of the year. The 1982 team was inducted into the New Zealand Sports Hall of Fame in 1995.

Awards
| Preceded by Allison Roe | New Zealand Sportsman of the Year; 1982; With: George Keys, Les O'Connell, Dave Rodger, Mike Stanley, Andrew Stevenson, Chris White, Roger White-Parsons, Andy Hay | Succeeded by Chris Lewis |
