= Andrew Matheson =

New Zealand rower and sports official

Personal information
- Born: 17 July 1969 (age 57)

Sport
- Sport: Rowing
Medal record
Men's rowing
Representing New Zealand
World Championships
Silver medal – second place	1995 Tampere, Finland	Coxed four

Andrew Matheson (born 17 July 1969) is a former New Zealand rower who became a sports administrator. He is the current chief executive officer of Cycling New Zealand, the country's umbrella body embracing all national bike and cycling organisations.

Matheson was born in 1969. He received his tertiary education from the University of Otago (1990–1995), from where he graduated with a Bachelor of Commerce in marketing, and a Bachelor of Physical Education in physiology and biomechanics. At the 1995 World Rowing Championships in Tampere, Finland, Matheson won a silver medal in the coxed four, with Chris White, Murdoch Dryden, Chris McAsey, and Michael Whittaker as cox.

Following his rowing career, Matheson was a product manager for beverage company Frucor (2001–2002). From 2003 to 2008, he was High Performance Manager for Rowing New Zealand, but did not return from the 2008 Summer Olympics in Beijing with the rowing team, as according to claims reported in mainstream media, Rowing Australia had made him an offer he couldn't refuse. Matheson was succeeded as High Performance Manager by Alan Cotter. From 2008 to 2012, Matheson was the head coach for Rowing Australia, and he was based in Canberra. He announced his retirement from the Australian role before the 2012 Summer Olympics in London but remained in charge until after the games had finished. He returned to New Zealand in 2012 to take up the role of general manager with High Performance Sport New Zealand, a subsidiary of Sport New Zealand. In May 2014, he was appointed chief executive officer of BikeNZ, which he renamed later that year to Cycling New Zealand.
