= Caleb Shepherd =

New Zealand rowing cox

Personal information
- Born: 29 June 1993 (age 33) Huntly, New Zealand
- Height: 1.68 m (5 ft 6 in)
- Weight: 53 kg (117 lb)

Sport
- Country: New Zealand
- Sport: Rowing
- Events: Coxed pair, Eight
- Club: Waikato
Medal record
Rowing
Representing New Zealand
Olympic Games
Silver medal – second place	2020 Tokyo	Women's eight
World Championships
Gold medal – first place	2014 Amsterdam	Men's coxed pair
Gold medal – first place	2019 Ottensheim	Women's eight

Caleb Shepherd (born 29 June 1993) is a New Zealand rowing cox. He holds the world best time in the men's coxed pair (2014) and represented at the Rio Olympics in the New Zealand eight. He coxed the New Zealand women's eight to their 2019 World Championship title and has been twice a world champion.

== Private life ==
Shepherd was born in 1993 and is from Huntly. He received his secondary education at Hamilton Boys' High School as a boarder where he started coxing in 2006. Shepherd completed a master's degree at the University of Waikato in 2020, with a thesis on depression in autobiographical sports writing. Shepherd wants to become a sports journalist.

Of Māori descent, Shepherd affiliates to the Ngāti Porou iwi.

== Rowing ==
At the 2011 World Rowing Junior Championships at Dorney Lake, Dorney, England, Shepherd won silver with the junior men's coxed four. At the 2012 World Rowing U23 Championships at Trakai in Lithuania, Shepherd won bronze with the U23 men's coxed four. At the 2013 World Rowing U23 Championships at Linz-Ottensheim in Austria, he won gold with the men's eight. A year later at the July 2014 World Rowing U23 Championships in Varese, Italy, he won another gold with the same boat. On 29 August 2014, Shepherd was the cox for Hamish Bond and Eric Murray when they set the world best time in the men's coxed pair at the 2014 World Rowing Championships at Bosbaan, Amsterdam in the final race, thus winning gold. As of 2021 that time still stood as the world's best. He came fourth at the 2015 World Rowing Championships with the men's eight, qualifying the boat for the 2016 Olympics. This is the first time that a New Zealand eight qualified for the Olympics since 1984, despite the famous performance of past eights including the 1982 New Zealand eight. He came sixth with his team at the eights competition in Rio de Janeiro.
