= Michael Whittaker (rowing) =

New Zealand rower

Personal information
- Born: 12 September 1970 (age 55)

Sport
- Sport: Rowing
Medal record
Men's rowing
Representing New Zealand
World Championships
Silver medal – second place	1995 Tampere, Finland	Coxed four

Michael Whittaker (born 12 September 1970) is a New Zealand coxswain.

At the 1995 World Rowing Championships in Tampere, Finland, Whittaker won a silver medal in the coxed four, with Chris White, Andrew Matheson, Murdoch Dryden, and Chris McAsey. Whittaker is self-employed as a mortgage broker.
