= Ray Harper (rugby union) =

New Zealand rugby union footballer, coach, and administrator (1927–2019)

Raymond Aubrey Ian Harper QSO QSM (19 July 1927 – 4 April 2019) was a New Zealand rugby union player, administrator and manager.

== Early life and family ==
Born in Invercargill on 19 July 1927, Harper was the son of Arthur and Bertha Harper. He was educated at Waitaki Boys' High School. In 1953, he married Natalie Winifred Thomas, and the couple went on to have two daughters, one of whom married rugby writer Bob Howitt.

== Sporting career ==
=== Rugby union player ===
Harper represented Southland as a player for seven years.

=== Administrator ===
Harper was a life member of the Southland Rugby Union, serving as an administrator of the union for 24 years, and representing Southland on the NZRFU council from 1974 to 1987. Harper was involved in the planning for the inaugural Rugby World Cup in 1987, and was a tour manager for the Junior All Blacks on three tours. He managed the All Blacks on their 1980 tours to Australia and Fiji and North America and Wales.

Harper was a driving force behind the inauguration of Stadium Southland, Invercargill's all-weather sports venue.

== Death ==
Harper died in Invercargill from bone cancer on 4 April 2019, aged 91 years.

== Honours and awards ==
In the 1991 Queen's Birthday Honours, Harper was awarded the Queen's Service Medal for community service. In the 2004 Queen's Birthday Honours, he was appointed a Companion of the Queen's Service Order, also for community service.

Harper was awarded the Steinlager Salver award for exceptional contributions to New Zealand rugby at the 2012 Steinlager New Zealand Rugby Awards.
