= Patrick Lynch (educationalist) =

New Zealand educationalist

Sir Patrick Lynch KNZM QSO
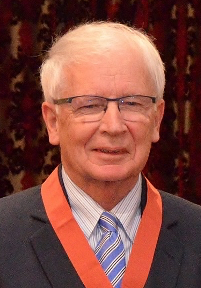
- Lynch in 2015
- Born: Patrick Joseph Lynch; 18 March 1942 (age 84); Auckland, New Zealand
- Occupation: Schoolteacher

Sir Patrick Joseph Lynch KNZM QSO (born 18 March 1942) is a New Zealand educationalist.

== Biography ==
Born in Auckland on 18 March 1942, Lynch grew up in Auckland in the suburb of Papatoetoe and attended De La Salle College, Mangere East. He studied at the Catholic College of Education, Sydney, and became a religious brother of the De La Salle Order. Lynch went on to graduate from the University of Auckland with a Bachelor of Arts in 1972, and obtained a Diploma of Human Development from La Salle University in 1976, and a Diploma of Education from Massey University in 1977.

Lynch taught at various Catholic schools between 1963 and 1993, and was principal of De La Salle College, Auckland, from 1979 to 1993. He served as president of the Secondary Principals Association of New Zealand (SPANZ) from 1992 until 1994, and then, while remaining a member of the De La Salle Brothers Community at Mangere East, chief executive of the New Zealand Catholic Education Office (NZCEO), a position he held for 21 years from 1994 until 2015.

Around 86,000 students were enrolled in Catholic State-integrated schools in 2015. This represented 78% of all Catholic students and just under 10 percent of all students in the New Zealand school system. As the head of the NZCEO, Lynch was instrumental in promoting the national organisational development of the Catholic state integrated school system and also the creation of a national system to review and develop the "special character" of New Zealand Catholic schools (i.e. the religious dimension) in coordination with Education Review Office school reviews. He dealt with 15 different Ministers of Education during his tenure as chief executive.

== Honours ==
In 1990, Lynch was awarded the New Zealand 1990 Commemoration Medal. In the 1991 Queen's Birthday Honours, Lynch was appointed a Companion of the Queen's Service Order for public services. In the 2015 New Year Honours, he was appointed a Knight Companion of the New Zealand Order of Merit for services to education.

== See also ==
- Roman Catholicism in New Zealand
