= Chris McAsey (rower) =

New Zealand rower and sailor

Personal information
- Relative: Sandra Easterbrook (mother-in-law)

Sport
- Sport: Rowing
Medal record
Men's rowing
Representing New Zealand
World Championships
Silver medal – second place	1995 Tampere, Finland	Coxed four

Chris McAsey is a New Zealand rower and sailor.

McAsey is from Hāwera with much of his extended family still living in that part of Taranaki. At the 1995 World Rowing Championships in Tampere, Finland, McAsey won a silver medal in the coxed four, with Chris White, Andrew Matheson, Murdoch Dryden, and Michael Whittaker as cox.

He later switched to sailing, joining Team New Zealand as a grinder for their 2003, 2007, and 2013 America's Cup campaigns. He worked as a truck driver after the 2013 America's Cup.

McAsey is married to Suzy Easterbrook, who represented New Zealand at beach volleyball. Easterbrook's mother, Sandra Easterbrook, was a member of the New Zealand national netball team that won the 1967 World Netball Tournament.
