= Jim Dryden =

New Zealand sport wrestler (1907–1974)

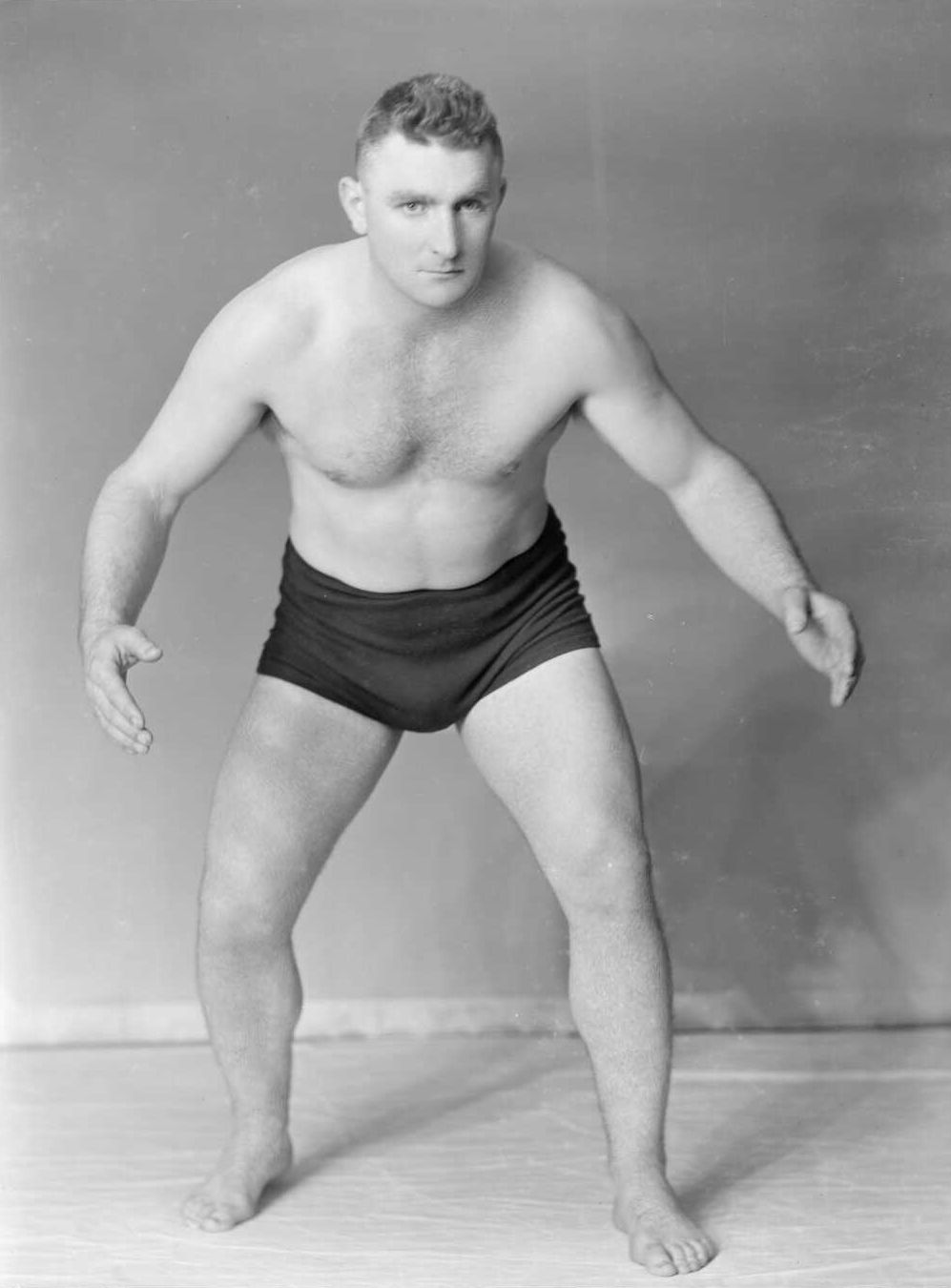
- Dryden in 1937

Personal information
- Born: James Herbert Ferrier Dryden; 8 July 1907 Gateshead, England
- Died: 29 October 1974 (aged 67) Auckland, New Zealand
- Weight: 110 kg (17 st 4 lb)
- Relatives: Alistair Dryden (son); Murdoch Dryden (grandson)

Sport
- Country: New Zealand
- Sport: Wrestling
Medal record
Men's wrestling
Representing New Zealand
Commonwealth Games
Silver medal – second place	1938 Sydney	Heavyweight

James Herbert Ferrier Dryden (8 July 1907 – 29 October 1974) was a New Zealand wrestler who won a silver medal at the 1938 British Empire Games.

== Early life ==
Born in Gateshead, England, on 8 July 1907, Dryden was the son of Margery Dryden (née Waddell) and Herbert Dryden. The family emigrated to New Zealand on the SS Westmeath in 1913, landing in Wellington, and settling in Wairarapa.

== Wrestling ==
Dryden won the New Zealand amateur wrestling championship in the heavyweight division in 1937. He was then selected to represent his country at the 1938 British Empire Games in Sydney, where he won the silver medal in the men's heavyweight (100 kg) category. In 1938 and 1939, Dryden successfully defended his heavyweight title at the national amateur championships.

Dryden later contested a number of professional wrestling bouts, particularly in 1942 and 1943, including against Lofty Blomfield and Ken Kenneth.

== Family and death ==
On 6 February 1929, Dryden married Lilian Anne Osborne at Carterton. In 1940, Dryden married Lynda Evelyn Phelps in Tauranga. Their son, Alistair Dryden, represented New Zealand twice at Olympic Games in rowing. Their grandson, Murdoch Dryden, was also a representative rower.

Dryden's third marriage was to Mary Alison Weedin in Auckland in 1974. He died in Auckland on 29 October 1974, and was buried at Purewa Cemetery, Auckland.
