= Limbo (dance) =

Traditional dance contest from Trinidad

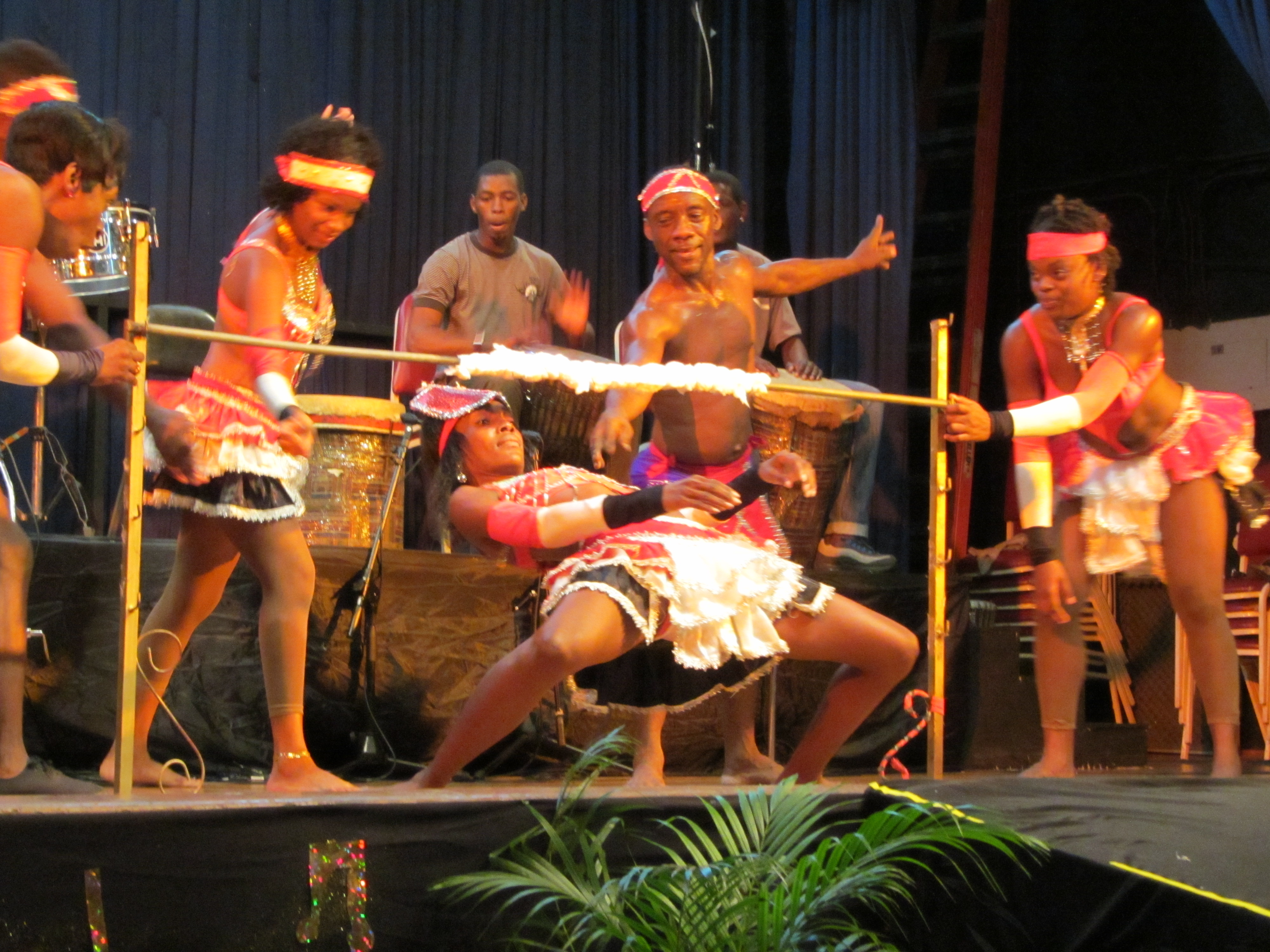
A limbo dancer

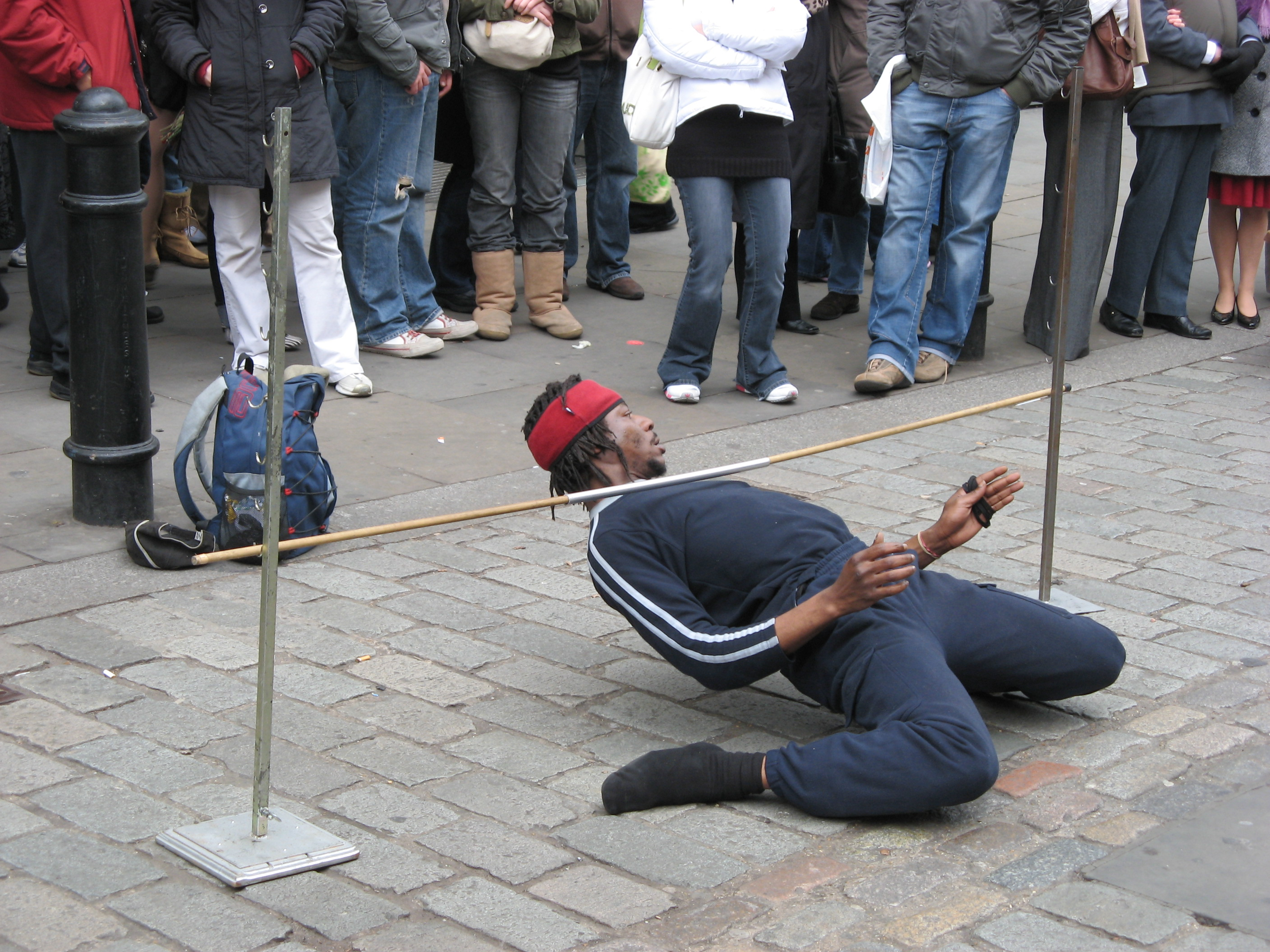
A man participating in limbo in London

Limbo is a game, based on traditions that originated in Trinidad and Tobago. The aim is to pass forwards under a low bar without falling or dislodging the bar.

The dance originated as an event that took place at wakes in Tobago. It was popularized in the 1950s by dance pioneer Julia Edwards (known as the First Lady of Limbo) and her company which appeared in several films, in particular Fire Down Below (1957), and toured widely in the Caribbean, Europe, North America, South America, Asia, and Africa in the 1960s and later.

== Rules ==
A horizontal bar, known as the limbo bar, is supported by two vertical bars. All contestants must attempt to go under the bar with their backs facing toward the floor. When passing under the bar, players must bend backwards. No part of their body is allowed to touch the bar, and no part other than their feet may touch the ground. They must not turn their head or neck to the side. Whoever knocks the bar off or falls is eliminated. After everyone has passed under the bar in this manner, the bar is lowered slightly and the contest continues. The contest ends when only one person can pass under the bar.

== History ==
The word 'limbo' dates back to the 1950s. It is conjectured that limbo is a Trinidadian English derivative of limbus.

This dance is also used at funerals. It is believed it may be related to the African legba or legua game.

Consistent with certain African beliefs, the game reflects the whole cycle of life....The players move under a pole that is gradually lowered from chest level and they emerge on the other side as their heads clear the pole as in the triumph of life over death.

The limbo dates back to the mid to late 1800s in Tobago. It achieved mainstream popularity during the 1950s. An alternative explanation of the name is suggested; that the version of the limbo performed in nineteenth century Tobago was meant to symbolize slaves entering the galleys of a slave ship, or a spirit crossing over into the afterworld, or "limbo", but no literary reference is known to substantiate this postulated linkage.

Dr Alan Rice elaborates on the supposed link the game has with the slave trade: "Africans were forced to game on deck for exercise. Many took advantage of this to bond and communicate with their shipmates by dancing steps remembered from their past in Africa. This was to continue in the Americas in games, religious ceremonies and other musical forms that used cultural traditions from Africa. One such game was the limbo in the Caribbean. The limbo spoke directly of the limited space in the slaving ships and the African ability to escape it."

== Popularization ==
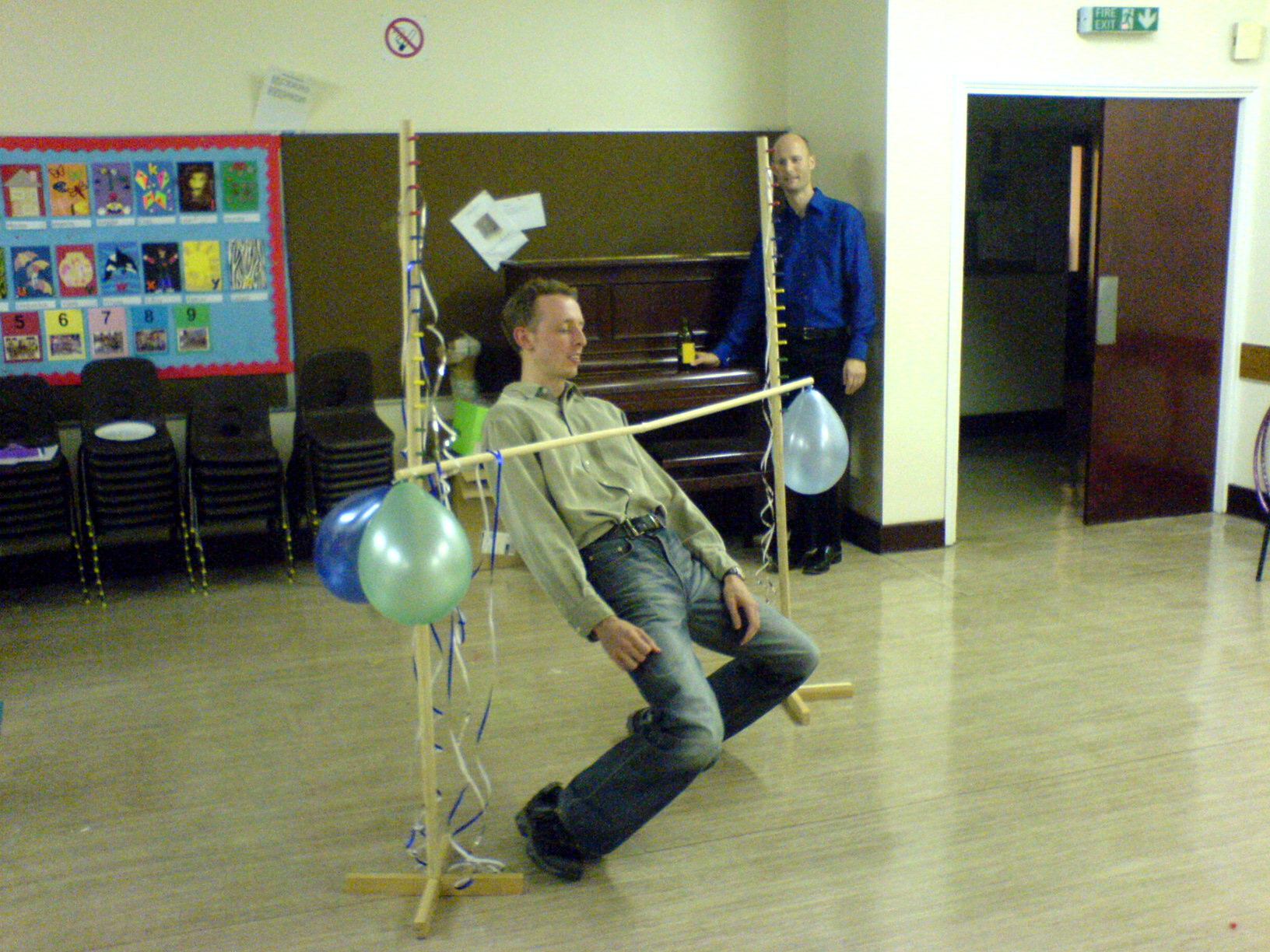
Limbo player attempting lowered pole

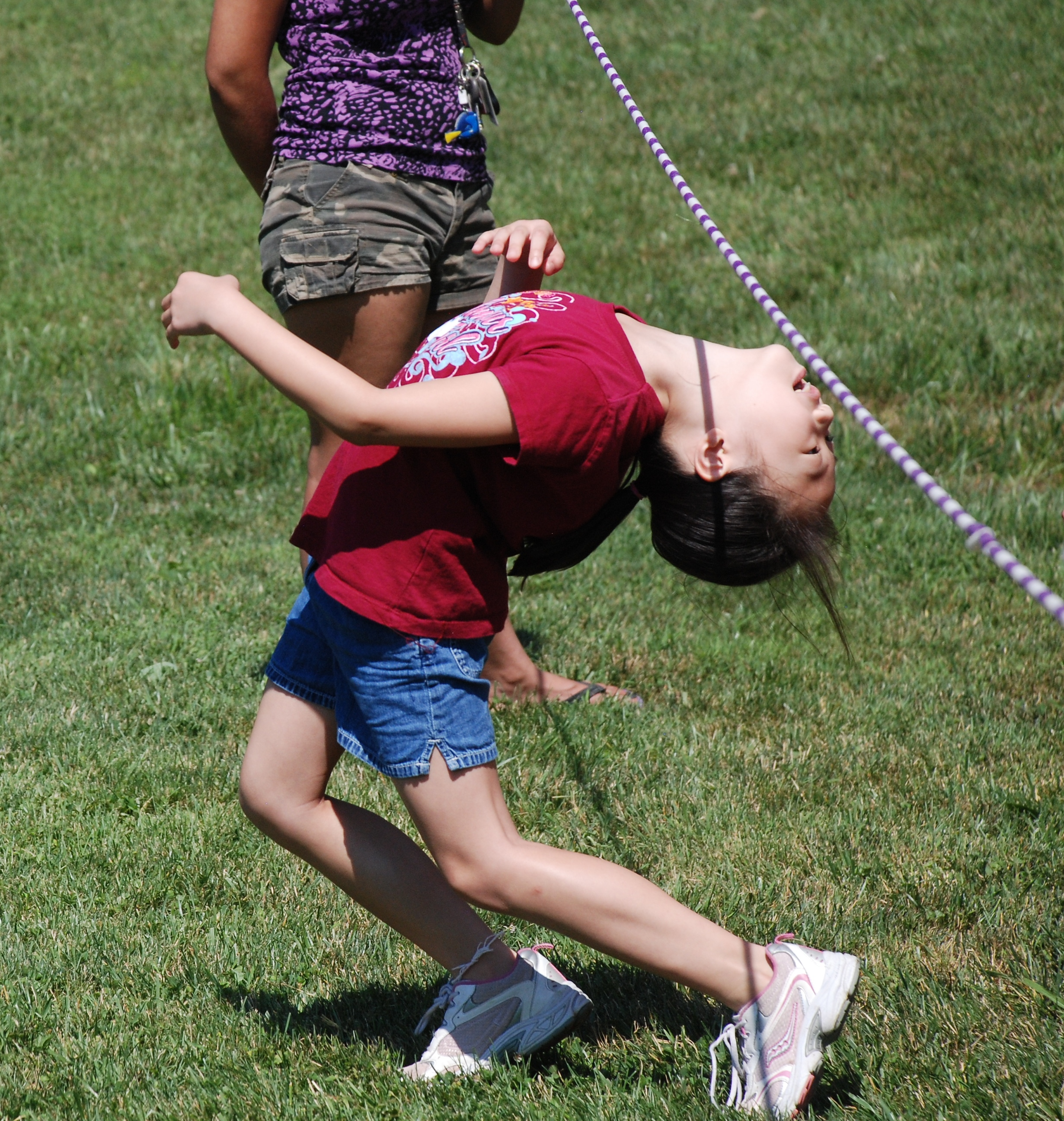
Limbo played as a children's game in a Virginia school

Traditionally, the limbo game began at the lowest possible bar height and the bar was gradually raised, signifying an emergence from death into life. In its adaptation to the world of entertainment, troupes began reversing the traditional order. According to a 1956 newspaper report, the game was revived in 1944 by Edric Connor. It became a popular entertainment in Trinidad and was adopted as a physical fitness exercise by American troops. In the 1950s, choreographer and player Julia Edwards added a number of features that are now considered standard, such as human 'bars' formed by the limbs of other players and the use of fire in the performance of limbo. A film, Julia and Joyce, by Trinidadian-American Sonja Dumas, was released in 2010. It traces the evolution of limbo dancing and the contribution of Edwards to its popularity.

Limbo players generally move and respond to a number of specific Afro-Caribbean drum patterns. As Limbo gained popularity as a tourist activity and a form of entertainment, pop music began using Caribbean rhythms to respond to the emerging craze in the United States. One example is the song "Limbo Rock" (recorded by Chubby Checker), which became a number 2 charted hit on the Billboard Top 100, from which emerged the popular quote/chant that is associated with limbo which Checker also helped to popularize: "How low can you go?" Limbo was brought into the mainstream by Trinidadian Calypsonian Brigo (Samuel Abrahams) with his popular Soca song "Limbo Break". A version of the game is also popular in skating rinks.

Limbo is considered the unofficial national game of Trinidad and Tobago, which refers to itself as the land of limbo, steelpan (steel drums), and calypso. After a preparatory game, the player prepares and approaches the bar, lowering and leaning back their body while balancing on feet akimbo with knees extended backwards. The player is declared "out" and loses the contest if any part of the body touches the stick or pole that they are passing beneath, or if the hands touch the floor. When several players compete, they go under the stick in single-file; the stick is gradually lowered until only one player, who has not touched either the pole or the floor, remains.

As Limbo spread out of Trinidad and Tobago to the wider world and the big screen, limbo became a major part of the tourism package in several other Caribbean islands, such as Barbados and Jamaica. In Jamaica, the trendy limbo music of the 1950s was often based on a clave rhythm. It is also widely heard in Jamaican mento recorded in the 1950s, in songs such as "Limbo" by Lord Tickler and Calypsonians, or "Limbo" by Denzil Laing & the Wrigglers, as well as many other songs not directly related to the limbo game itself. Limbo's continued significance in Trinidadian and Tobagonian culture is clearly demonstrated in festivals and social events across the two islands, including performances by popular game troupes at the Prime Minister's Best Village Competition, and during the Carnival season in Trinidad and Tobago.

When performing for tourists, professional limbo players often invite spectators to participate after their own presentation of the game. The massive popularity of limbo has emerged directly from this audience participation. In recent years, limbo dancing has been conducted as a social "icebreaker" game for tourists at Caribbean and other tropical resorts. The winning player often receives a prize.

== World record ==
The world record for lowest limbo game is held by Dennis Walston, who successfully attempted a 6-inch (15 cm) bar in March 1991.

The world record for lowest female limbo game is held by Shemika Charles, a 26-year-old woman from Trinidad who lives in Buffalo, NY. On 16 September 2010, she successfully played under a bar 8.5 inches (22 cm) above the ground.

Shemika Charles-Campbell also holds her second world record for the Farthest Distance Limbo Under 12 inches. The record setting limbo was completed under vehicles and measured a distance of 12.67 ft (3.8 meters). The record was attained on 9 October 2020 in her home country Trinidad and Tobago.
