= Jocelyn Fish =

New Zealand politician (1930–2021)

Dame Jocelyn Fish DNZM CBE JP
- Born: Jocelyn Barbara Green; 29 September 1930; Whangārei, New Zealand
- Died: 19 September 2021 (aged 90); Hamilton, New Zealand
- Education: Auckland University College
- Occupation: Schoolteacher
- Spouse: John Fish (m. 1959)
- Children: 3

Dame Jocelyn Barbara Fish DNZM CBE JP (née Green; 29 September 1930 – 19 September 2021) was a New Zealand women's rights campaigner.

== Biography ==
Fish was born Jocelyn Barbara Green, the daughter of Edna and John Green, at Whangārei on 29 September 1930. She was educated at Whangarei High School and Hamilton High School, and went on to study at Auckland University College, graduating Bachelor of Arts in 1952. She trained as a secondary school teacher, and taught at Fairfield College until her marriage to Robert John Malthus Fish, a farmer, in 1959. The couple had three children.

In 1980, Jocelyn Fish was elected as a Piako County councillor, the first woman in that role, and served until 1989. She was national president of the National Council of Women from 1986 to 1990, and served as a member of the Film and Literature Board of Review between 1981 and 1984. She was a member of the New Zealand national commission of UNESCO between 1989 and 1995, and was one of a group of women who lobbied for 1993 to be recognised as Women's Suffrage Year in New Zealand.

Fish died in Hamilton on 19 September 2021, aged 90.

== Honours and awards ==
In 1990, Fish received the New Zealand 1990 Commemoration Medal. The following year, in the 1991 Queen's Birthday Honours, she was appointed a Commander of the Order of the British Empire, for services to the community, and in 1993 she was awarded the New Zealand Suffrage Centennial Medal. In the 2001 New Year Honours, Fish was appointed a Distinguished Companion of the New Zealand Order of Merit, for services to women and the community, and in 2009, following the restoration of titular honours by the New Zealand government, she accepted redesignation as a Dame Companion of the New Zealand Order of Merit.
