= Johannes La Grouw =

New Zealand architect, businessperson (1913–2011)

Johannes La Grouw OBE
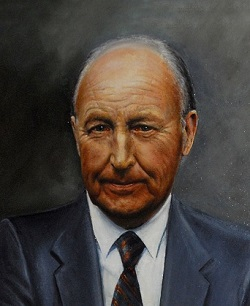
- Self portrait, 2001
- Born: 24 August 1913; Amsterdam, the Netherlands
- Died: 20 September 2011 (aged 98); Rotorua, New Zealand
- Spouse: Johanna Hillegonda Lalk (m. 1939–2009)
- Parent(s): Johannas La Grouw; Maria Elizabeth La Grouw, Dieperveen

Johannes La Grouw OBE (24 August 1913 – 20 September 2011) was a Dutch-born New Zealand architect, engineer, businessman, artist and philanthropist. La Grouw developed a patented house manufacturing system constructed of solid wood that eventually became renowned in New Zealand for its durable quality.

== Background ==
La Grouw was educated at Higher Technical School for Architecture and Engineering. He was a building contractor in Amsterdam, Holland, from 1948 to 1951. He was founding director of Lockwood Buildings Ltd. He was a life member of Outward Bound Trust.

== New Zealand company ==
La Grouw and Johannes Van Loghem (the co-founders of Lockwood Homes) began their unique company in 1951, by importing prefabricated homes from the Netherlands when Dutch migrants brought in crates of their own homes because of a building shortage. The company flourished and became a big player in the New Zealand construction industry.

== Honours ==
In the 1991 Queen's Birthday Honours, La Grouw was appointed an Officer of the Order of the British Empire, for services to the building and construction industry.

La Grouw was inducted into the New Zealand Business Hall of Fame in 2007 for his revolutionary house construction system and contributions to business in New Zealand and abroad.
