= Ces Blazey =

New Zealand rugby union and athletics administrator

Cecil Albert Blazey CBE ED (21 July 1909 – 20 February 1998), generally known as Ces Blazey, was a New Zealand rugby union and athletics administrator. During the controversial 1981 Springbok tour he was the NZRFU chairman and spokesman. He has been described as "one of the most outstanding sports administrators New Zealand has seen" and was "regarded internationally as the leading authority on the laws of the game".

== Early life and education ==
Born in Hastings, Hawke's Bay, New Zealand on 21 July 1909, Blazey was educated at Christchurch Boys' High School and Canterbury University College. He studied part-time towards a Bachelor of Commerce for two years but did not complete the degree, and played senior rugby in the late 1920s and early 1930s for the university club.

== Military service ==
Blazey joined the Territorial Force in 1927 and was commissioned as a 2nd lieutenant in the New Zealand Permanent Army Service Corps. At the outbreak of World War II he was rejected for overseas service for medical reasons, and instead was initially posted to administrative duties in New Zealand. He was promoted to temporary lieutenant colonel in 1942 and the following year was sent to the Pacific as commander, New Zealand Permanent Army Service Corps for the 3rd Division. He returned to New Zealand to a posting in the reserve in 1944 and was appointed an Officer of the Order of the British Empire (Military Division) in 1945. He also received the Efficiency Decoration.

== Sports administration ==
He was a member of the New Zealand Universities Rugby Council for 34 years from 1936 to 1949, later chairman and life member. He was first elected to the New Zealand Rugby Football Union executive in 1957, and became chairman from 1977 until he retired from the board in 1985. He was a delegate to the International Rugby Board from 1964 to 1986 (chairman in 1965, 1972 and 1985), and was on the board's Laws Committee from 1972 to 1985.

The decision of the NZRFU to invite a South African team to tour New Zealand in 1981 attracted international criticism, and Blazey was prominent as the NZRFU spokesman. He had been chairman of the New Zealand Amateur Athletic Association (NZAAA) from 1966, but stood down in 1981 because of the perceived conflict of interest. He was also a member of the New Zealand Olympic and Commonwealth Games Association from 1956 to 1980.

In 1990, Blazey was an inaugural inductee into the New Zealand Sports Hall of Fame. He was promoted to Commander of the Order of the British Empire in the 1991 Queen's Birthday Honours, for services to sport, especially rugby.

== Other activities ==
Throughout his working life, Blazey was employed by the AMP (insurance) Society. He rose to become New Zealand senior assistant manager, retiring in 1970.

He also served on various bodies including the National Heart Foundation and the New Zealand Broadcasting Corporation programme advisory committee.

== Death ==
Blazey died in Wellington in 1998 and his ashes were buried at Karori Cemetery.
