= Jim Ellis (jockey) =

New Zealand jockey and racehorse trainer

Leslie James Ellis (24 November 1910 – 30 March 1971) was a New Zealand jockey and racehorse trainer. He was born in Nightcaps, Southland, New Zealand on 24 November 1910. He was posthumously inducted into the New Zealand Sports Hall of Fame in 1997.

== See also ==
- Thoroughbred racing in New Zealand
