= Barrie Devenport =

New Zealand swimmer

Personal information
- Full name: John William Barrie Devenport
- Born: 7 October 1935; Wellington, New Zealand
- Died: 25 July 2010 (aged 74); Gold Coast, Queensland, Australia

Sport
- Sport: Swimming

John William Barrie Devenport (7 October 1935 – 25 July 2010, often mistakenly reported as "Barrie Davenport") was a New Zealand swimmer and lifesaver who was the first person in modern history to swim Cook Strait.

Devenport was born in Wellington on 7 October 1935. On 20 November 1962, at the age of 27, he swam from Cape Terawhiti in the North Island to Wellington Rock in the South Island in 11 hours, 13 minutes. He was inducted into the New Zealand Sports Hall of Fame in 1995.

He died in 2010 on the Gold Coast, Australia, after an 18-month battle with cancer.
