= 1991 Birthday Honours (New Zealand) =

Awards list for New Zealand

The 1991 Queen's Birthday Honours in New Zealand, celebrating the official birthday of Elizabeth II, were appointments made by the Queen in her right as Queen of New Zealand, on the advice of the New Zealand government, to various orders and honours to reward and highlight good works by New Zealanders. They were announced on 15 June 1991.

The recipients of honours are displayed here as they were styled before their new honour.

== Order of New Zealand (ONZ) ==
Ordinary member

- Dame Whina Cooper DBE JP – of Hokianga.
- The Very Reverend Dr John Spenser Somerville CMG MC – of Dunedin.
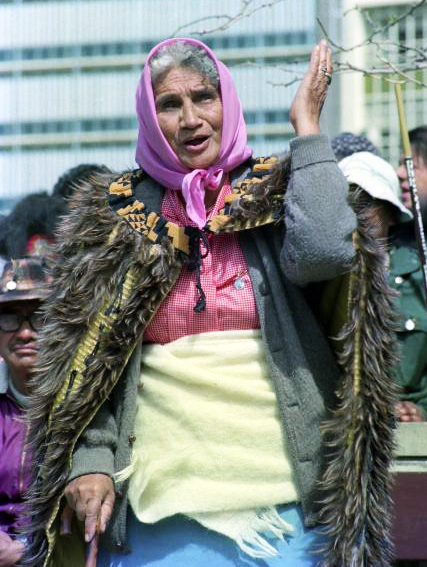
Dame Whina Cooper

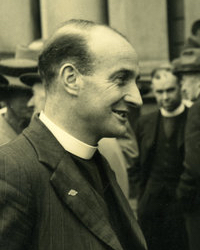
Jack Somerville

== Knight Bachelor ==
- The Right Honourable (Mr Justice) Maurice Eugene Casey – of Wellington; judge of the Court of Appeal.
- Professor Graham Collingwood Liggins CBE – of Auckland. For services to medical research.
- Arthur Dennis Pitt Williams – of Waikanae. For philanthropic services.

== Order of the Bath ==
=== Knight Commander (KCB) ===
Civil division

- The Right Honourable Brian Edward Talboys CH AC – of Winton. For public services.
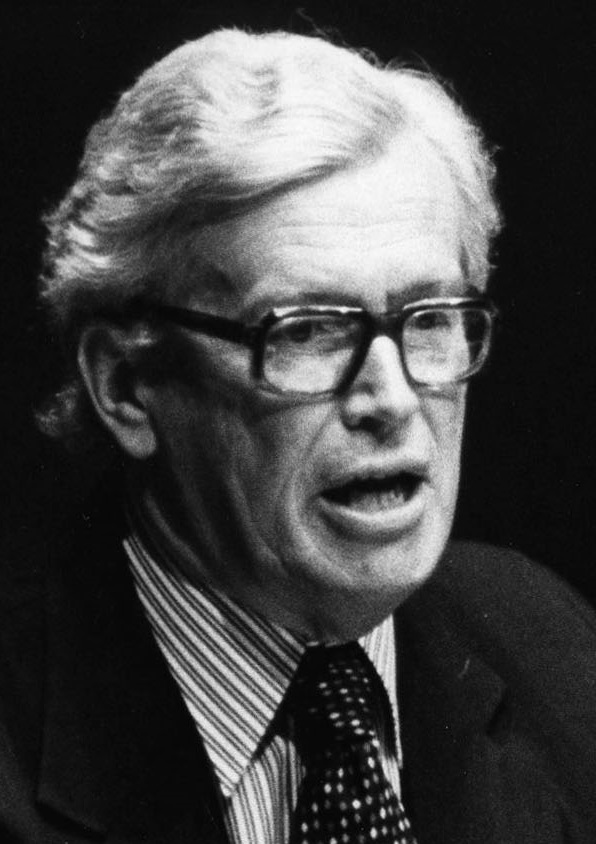
Sir Brian Talboys

=== Companion (CB) ===
Civil division

- Bernard Vincent Galvin – of Wellington. For public services.

Military division

- Major General Bruce Meldrum OBE – Generals' List, New Zealand Army; Chief of General Staff.

== Order of Saint Michael and Saint George ==
=== Companion (CMG) ===
- Brigadier John Lindsay Smith CBE – of Wellington; director, New Zealand Security Intelligence Service.

== Order of the British Empire ==
=== Dame Commander (DBE) ===
Civil division

- Malvina Lorraine Major OBE – of Ōpunake. For services to opera and the community.
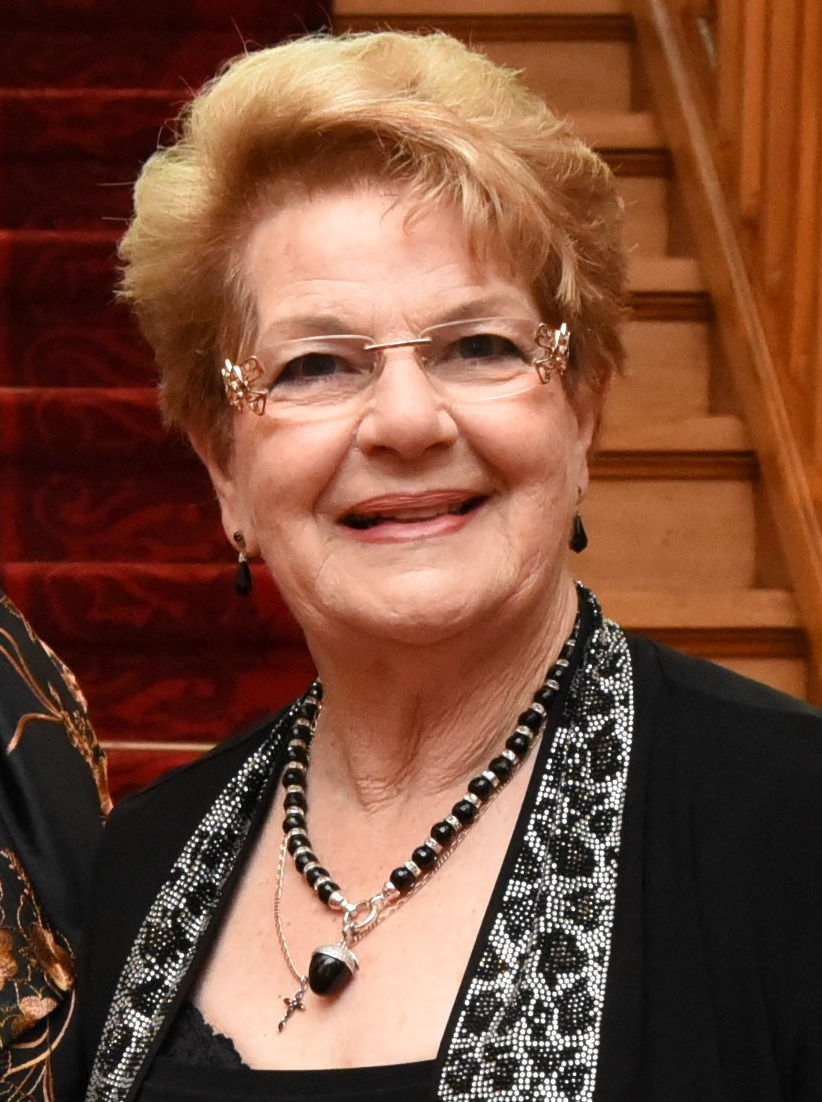
Dame Malvina Major

=== Commander (CBE) ===
Civil division

- Thomas Arthur Aldridge – of Auckland. For services to the XIV Commonwealth Games.
- George Samuel Beca DFC – of Auckland. For services to engineering and the community.
- Cecil Albert Blazey OBE ED – of Wellington. For services to sport, especially rugby.
- Graham Mitchell Cowley – of Napier. For services to the legal profession.
- Jocelyn Barbara Fish JP – of Hamilton. For services to the community.
- Norman Michael Thomas Geary – of Auckland. For services to tourism and the aviation industry.
- The Honourable (Mr Justice) Peter Gordon Hillyer – of Auckland; judge of the High Court.
- Isla Stewart McRae – of Hamilton. For services to the community.
- Robert Arthur Owens – of Auckland. For services to transport industry, local government and community.

=== Officer (OBE) ===
Civil division

- John Bernard Ede – of Auckland. For services to business management and the community.
- James Roy Eyles – of Nelson. For services to archaeology.
- John Douglas Fraser – of Wellington. For services to wool industry, trade, education and the community.
- Gordon Bruce Gibson – of New Plymouth. For services to farming and the port industry.
- John Waldron Grant – of Upper Hutt; lately director-general, Department of Social Welfare.
- Joseph Walter Thomas Hill – of Nelson. For services to the hop industry and racing.
- Johannes La Grouw Sr – of Rotorua. For services to building and construction industry.
- Bernard Lewis Lyons JP – of Wellington. For public and community services.
- Ronald Cameron Macdonald – of Wellington. For services to business management and the community.
- Alistair James McLachlan – of Wellington. For services to the stock and station industry.
- George McMillan – of Wellington; lately chief executive, Land Corporation Limited.
- Thomas Gordon McNab JP – of Balclutha. For services to the community.
- Dr Maurice Dominic Matich – of Dargaville. For services to medicine and the community.
- Walter Ivan Matthews JP – of Waipukurau. For services to agriculture.
- Emmett Thomas Mitten – assistant commissioner, New Zealand Police.
- Nigel John Dermot (Sam) Neill – of Mosgiel. For services as an actor.
- Peter Fredrick Hodgson Rowley – of Amberley. For services to the aviation industry.
- Eulla Campbell Williamson JP – of Geraldine. For services to local-body and community affairs.

Military division

- Colonel Neil Arthur Bradley – Colonels' List, New Zealand Army.
- Group Captain David William Hill – Royal New Zealand Air Force.
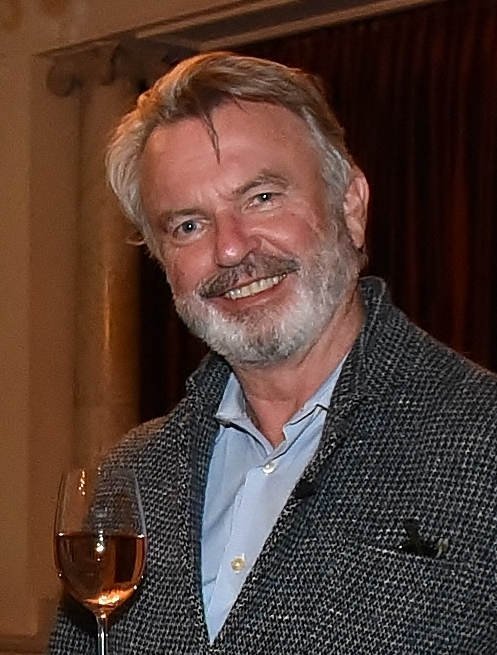
Sam Neill

=== Member (MBE) ===
Civil division

- George Albert Ian Aston – of Blenheim. For services to sport.
- Robert Aitken Barton – of Palmerston North. For services to the livestock industry.
- Francis Kenneth Stewart Browne – of Cambridge. For services to the racing industry.
- Ronald David Cheatley – of Wanganui. For services to cycling.
- The Reverend Robert Percival Emery – of Te Kūiti. For services to the community.
- John Feltrim Fagan – of Te Kūiti. For services to sheep farming.
- Mary Emma Fahey – of Christchurch. For services to the community.
- Leonora Elizabeth Grant (Lee Grant) – of Auckland. For services to the theatre.
- Charles John Hill – of Wellington; lately deputy secretary of the Cabinet and deputy clerk of the Executive Council.
- Maxwell Herbert Hindmarsh – of Tauranga; lately superintendent, Auckland Maximum Security Prison, Department of Justice.
- Dr Alan Bernard Howard Howes – of Pukekohe. For services to the community.
- Douglas William Hulton – of Rotorua. For services to the community.
- John Edward Jardine – of Wairoa. For services to conservation.
- John (Hone) Kamariera JP – of Kaitaia. For services to the Māori people and the community.
- Colin Ross Mawson – of Dargaville. For services to education and the community.
- Neil Wilson Monk – of Carterton. For services to local-body and community affairs.
- Basil Graham Prout – of Whangaparāoa. For services to the community.
- Daphne Maureen May Robinson – of Dunedin. For services to sport and the community.
- Cyril Leonard Love Smith – of Christchurch. For services to the community.
- Dr Harvey Caplin Smith – of Christchurch. For services to agricultural science.
- Christine Nancy Taylor – of Auckland. For services to family health.
- Noel Joseph Toomey – of Napier. For services to the Trust Bank organisation and health administration.
- Betty Frances Webb JP – of Christchurch. For services to the aged.
- Sherwood Ivan Young – chief inspector, New Zealand Police.

Military division

- Acting Lieutenant Commander Roger Graeme Macdonald – Royal New Zealand Navy.
- Warrant Officer Class One Benjamin Nuele Akari – Corps of Royal New Zealand Engineers.

== British Empire Medal (BEM) ==
Military division

- Chief Petty Officer Brian Patrick Algar – Royal New Zealand Navy.
- Chief Petty Officer Tukimihia Ngatai – Royal New Zealand Navy.
- Corporal Stanley Brice Utiger – Royal New Zealand Infantry Regiment (Retired).
- Temporary Warrant Officer Robert Douglas Gillies – Royal New Zealand Air Force.

== Companion of the Queen's Service Order (QSO) ==
=== For community service ===
- Edith Nancy Berkeley – of Waikanae.
- John David Otley Ellis – of Auckland.
- Ian Duncan McKinnon – of Windsor, United Kingdom.
- Emarina Manuel MBE – of Wairoa.
- Jean Puketapu – of Wainuiomata.
- Tagaloa Patricia, Lady Rex – of Niue.
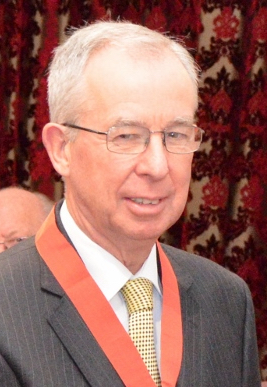
Ian McKinnon

=== For public services ===
- John Lachlan Campbell JP – of Whangamatā.
- The Honourable Manuera Benjamin Rīwai Couch JP – of Masterton.
- Darcy Richard Crone JP – of Inglewood.
- Stanley William Basil Duncan – of Dunedin.
- Dr Murdoch MacRae Herbert TD – of Auckland.
- Sefulu Isaia Ioane – of Auckland.
- Brother Patrick Joseph Lynch – of Auckland.
- John George McArthur – of Clive.
- Alexander Dalrymple McGregor – of Tolaga Bay.
- John Leslie Munro DSO DFC JP – of Te Kūiti.
- The Honourable Robert Leslie Gapper Talbot – of Wellington.
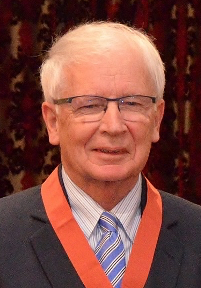
Patrick Lynch

== Queen's Service Medal (QSM) ==
=== For community service ===
- Walter John Baguley – of Christchurch.
- Ronald Duncan Bird – of Auckland.
- Bertram Chalmers Clausen – of Leeston.
- Colin John Doran – of Ōtorohanga.
- Janet Wilson Ellison – of Waipukurau.
- Jessie Athole Fenwick – of Te Puke.
- Eric Stephen Fernandez – of Auckland.
- Gwendolen Mabel Garrick – of Hamilton.
- Arthur Vivian Gazley – of Wellington.
- Marian Kathleen George – of Auckland.
- Raymond Felix Green – of Lower Hutt.
- Ronald Felix Hanna – of Auckland.
- Raymond Aubrey Ian Harper – of Invercargill.
- John Bruce Harrison – of Opua.
- Audrey Elizabeth Healy – of Auckland.
- Lindsey Keith Holloway – of Te Kūiti.
- Valerie Jean Killery JP – of Whakatāne.
- Frederick Martin Kimbel – of Masterton.
- Donald James Law – of Whangamōmona.
- Peter Charles Leitch – of Auckland.
- Dudley Jack Lyons – of Auckland.
- Alfred Carswell Marett MC – of Christchurch.
- Ellen Emmeline Millington – of Ōhaupō.
- Joyce Edith Osborne – of Palmerston North.
- Bernard Harold Passau – of Paeroa.
- Joseph (John) William Percival – of Auckland.
- Lorraine Gloria Peters – of Christchurch.
- Flora Mei Reiri – of Masterton.
- Valmai Kathleen Robertson – of Otautau.
- Ruruhira Robin – of Hastings.
- Miria Simpson – of Wellington.
- Ian Hunter Steel – of Wellington.
- Barbara Jean Towers – of Waipawa.
- Charles William Vennell – of Cambridge.
- Margaret Mary Whitta – of Auckland.
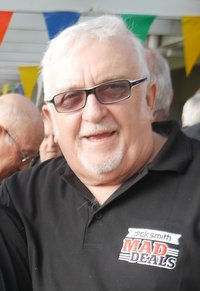
Peter Leitch

=== For public services ===
- Alexander Beverley – of Blenheim.
- William Sydney Wiseman Brears – of Matiere.
- Kathleen Butler JP – of Napier.
- Elsie Mavis Cameron – of Christchurch.
- Ethel Joyce Campbell (Sister de Lourdes Campbell) – of Dunedin.
- Patricia Alice Cash – of Marton.
- Lorna Clarke – of Whataroa; principal nurse, Whataroa Hospital.
- Eleanor Joan Gaskell – of Whitianga.
- Terrence Hamilton-Jenkins – of Napier; senior bailiff, District Court, Department of Justice, Napier.
- Florence Frisbie (Johnny) Hebenstreit – of Dunedin.
- Ursula Margaret Helem – of Christchurch.
- The Reverend Catherine Adelaide Hollister-Jones – of Tauranga.
- Joan Marjory Hough – of Waitangi, Chatham Islands.
- Ann Kemble-Welch – of Nelson.
- Phyllis Jean Lash – of Foxton.
- Stanley George Laurenson JP – of Marton.
- Barbara Anne Miller – of Taupiri.
- Lysbeth Noble – of Wanganui.
- Zita Margaret Outtrim – of Wellington.
- Agnes Barbara Patterson – of Hāwera.
- Brian Denys Sharplin – of Whangaparaoa.
- The Reverend Peter Anderson Shields – of Christchurch.
- Allan William Tassell – of Whakatāne.
- Susan Jennifer Rangikawhetu Thorburn – of Paihia.
- Jessie Grace Grinton Tilley – of Auckland.
- Nancy Patricia Tomasi – of Hari Hari.
- Dr Thomas Charles Trott – of Rotorua.
- Errol Hood Tweedy – of Springston.
- James Frederick Wards – of Auckland.
- Lionel Hugh Wilson – of Timaru.
- Brian Barton Yeoman – senior constable, New Zealand Police.
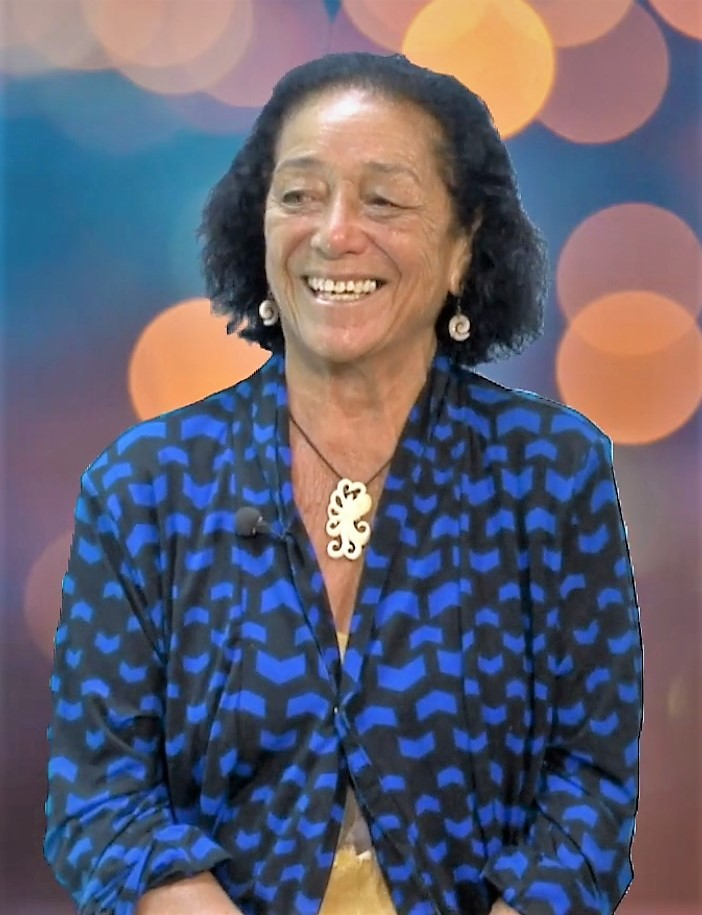
Johnny Frisbie

== Queen's Fire Service Medal (QFSM) ==
- Ronald Edwin Clark – lately senior station officer, Ravensbourne Volunteer Fire Brigade, New Zealand Fire Service.
- Peter Klue – chief fire officer, Hunterville Volunteer Fire Brigade, New Zealand Fire Service.
- Neville William Twort – chief fire officer, Wainuiomata Volunteer Brigade, New Zealand Fire Service.

== Queen's Police Medal (QPM) ==
- Brian Hamilton Bell – detective senior sergeant, New Zealand Police.

== Air Force Cross (AFC) ==
- Squadron Leader Ian Clifford Gore – Royal New Zealand Air Force
