= Murdoch Dryden =

New Zealand rower

Personal information
- Relatives: Alistair Dryden (father); Jim Dryden (grandfather)

Sport
- Sport: Rowing
- Club: Auckland Rowing Club
Medal record
Men's rowing
Representing New Zealand
World Championships
Silver medal – second place	1995 Tampere, Finland	Coxed four

Murdoch Dryden is a New Zealand rower. Dryden is the son of New Zealand Olympic rower Alistair Dryden and grandson of New Zealand amateur wrestling champion and Empire Games silver medallist Jim Dryden.

At the 1995 World Rowing Championships in Tampere, Finland, Dryden won a silver medal in the coxed four, with Chris White, Andrew Matheson, Chris McAsey, and Michael Whittaker as cox.
