= Harry Mahon =

New Zealand rowing coach (1878–1974)

Harold Thomas Mahon OBE (15 January 1942 – 19 May 2001) was a New Zealand rowing coach. He coached international crews from New Zealand, Switzerland, South Africa and Great Britain to success at World Championships and Olympic Games. He also coached Cambridge University to repeated successes in The Boat Race.

== Background ==
Mahon was born in Wanganui in 1942. He followed his grandfather and uncle into rowing, joining Wanganui Rowing Club. He also played cricket and rugby as a hooker, and toyed with becoming a rugby coach after studying geography at Victoria University. He rowed with some success in New Zealand, but was not an international oarsman. He married Rita Wood, although they separated in 1986.

After graduating, he began teaching at Melville High School, and joined Waikato Rowing Club. Success there led to him coaching the New Zealand national team eight to two world titles in 1982 and 1983. The failure of the eight to repeat that success in the 1984 Summer Olympics led to Mahon being gradually excluded from the New Zealand coaching setup, and moving to Switzerland.

He was a teacher of geography at Ridley College, Canada and Radley College near Oxford, England.

He was diagnosed with colon cancer in 1997 and, despite being given only months to live, continued to coach with some success for four more years, also running the London Marathon twice during that period. After his death in 2001 the Harry Mahon Cancer Research Trust was established to raise money for research equipment. He was survived by his partner, Sarah Warburton.

== Coaching style ==
Mahon taught a relaxed style, favouring technique over aggression in his crews. Though reserved off the water, he talked almost constantly to his crews in training, asking them to concentrate on their own feel for the rhythm of the boat.

== Honours ==
In the 1984 New Year Honours, Mahon was appointed an Officer of the Order of the British Empire, for services to rowing.

At the 1982 Halberg Awards, the New Zealand eight coached by Mahon was crowned "Sportsman of the Year". The 1982 team was inducted into the New Zealand Sports Hall of Fame in 1995.

Mahon was named the New Zealander of the Year in Britain in 2001.

== Coaching titles ==
- 1977 NZ 4- Silver Medal World Championships
- 1982–1983 NZ 8+ Gold Medal World Championships
- 1982 NZ W1x Bronze Medal World Championships
- 1986 NZ 4+ Silver medal World Championships
- 1988 Olympics – Swiss 2X Silver Medal, NZ W2- Bronze Medal
- 1997 GB 1X Bronze Medal World Championships
- 2000 Olympics GB 8+ Gold Medal, NZ 1X Gold Medal
- 1993–1999 & 2001 Boat Races (Cambridge)
