= Julia Edwards =

Trinidadian dancer and choreographer (1933–2017)

- Born: 1933; Port of Spain, Trinidad
- Died: 24 May 2017 (aged 84); San Diego, California, United States
- Occupations: Dancer, choreographer
- Years active: 1947–c.2000
- Known for: Popularizing and developing limbo dancing

Julia Edwards (1933 – 24 May 2017) was a Trinidadian dancer and choreographer. Known as the "Queen of Limbo" or "First Lady of Limbo", she was responsible for popularizing limbo dancing as a performance in the 1950s and early 1960s, and for inventing many of its variations.

== Biography ==
Edwards was born in Port of Spain, Trinidad, and educated at Tranquillity Girls' School. She began dancing in 1947, when her brother Irwin introduced her to Boscoe Holder's dance troupe. The group was later taken over by Boscoe's brother Geoffrey Holder. When he left in 1953 for a career as actor and dancer in the United States, Edwards formed her own troupe, the Julia Edwards Dance Group. She was described as a "folk choreographer", without any professional training, but devised "amazing routines that would astound people locally and globally".

The limbo dance was originally performed at wakes, with the bar at its lowest at the start and steadily raised each successive night to symbolise the deceased person's rise to heaven. Edwards turned the dance into a choreographed and competitive performance by reversing the process, with the bar steadily being lowered to show the dancer's suppleness. Working with costume designer Helen Humphrey and promoter and organiser Holly Betaudier, Edwards introduced the song "I want somebody to limbo like me" and helped promote the dance as a popular entertainment and tourist attraction. Her dance group performed at many hotels, clubs and restaurants in Trinidad. In 1957, after being seen performing at the Miramar club, Edwards took part with dancer "Stretch" Cox and other members of her troupe in the movie Fire Down Below starring Rita Hayworth and Robert Mitchum, which helped popularize the dance internationally. Edwards helped choreograph Hayworth's performance.

Edwards was responsible for introducing the flaming limbo bar in 1959, in a performance to mark the opening of Queen's Hall, and later introduced human "bars" formed by the limbs of other dancers. Several Limbo records feature her dance troupe on the cover, such as Limbo from Trinidad from RCA Victor. She appeared on The Ed Sullivan Show, and her dance group toured internationally, visiting the United States, Europe, South America, Africa and Asia, often with calypsonian Mighty Sparrow. She retired from performing with the group in 1972, but continued to act as its choreographer into the 2000s. In 1991, she was awarded the Trinidad & Tobago Hummingbird Medal, Gold, for Culture.

She died in San Diego, California, in 2017, aged 84, after several years of ill health.

== Legacy ==
A film, Julia and Joyce, by Trinidadian-American Sonja Dumas, was released in 2010. It traces the evolution of limbo dancing and the contribution of Edwards to its popularity. The Julia Edwards Dance Company continues to operate in Trinidad.

== In popular culture ==
Edwards is referenced in the Trini 2 De Bone episode of Atlanta.
