= Mike Stanley (filmmaker) =

US filmmaker

- Born: January 31, 1963 (age 63); Detroit, Michigan, U.S.
- Occupations: Director, screenwriter, producer, editor
- Known for: Horror films

Mike Stanley (born January 31, 1963) is an American director, screenwriter, producer and editor, known for his work in the horror genre.

== Biography ==
Stanley was born in Detroit, Michigan and began filming horror shorts on Super 8 film while in high school. In 1984 Stanley established his production company Filmlab Showcase Pictures and during that same year created a horror anthology series called Tales From Beyond, which ran on public access television during the 1980s.

In 1991 Stanley made the film Dead is Dead. Filming took place in Michigan and New York and its budget was financed entirely by Stanley. Stanley would later work with John A. Russo as a cinematographer for the documentary film Zombie Jamboree and later shot a series of short films and continues to make features.

== Filmography ==
- Tales From Beyond The Series (1984-1989)
- Dead is Dead (1992)
- Dead is Dead The Directors Cut (2008)
- Tales From Beyond (2010)
- Monster in the Woods (2010)
- Octoberfeast (2011)
- Dead is Dead Again (2011)
- Michigrim (2012)
- The Plague of Willow Bay (2013)
- The Arrival (2014)
- Dead is Dead 25 (2014)
- Spring Thaw (2015)
- Deadtroit (2016)
- Cropped Circles (2017)
- The Beast From Beyond (2019)
- Roseville Reflections (2020)
- Members Only (2020)
- Blood, Gore & Public Access: The Story of Tales from Beyond (2021)
- Breakfast (2022)
- Almost Yesterday (2023)
- Night of the Living Drive-in (2024)
- 2:43 am (2025)
