= Allison Roe =

New Zealand long-distance runner

Allison Roe MBE
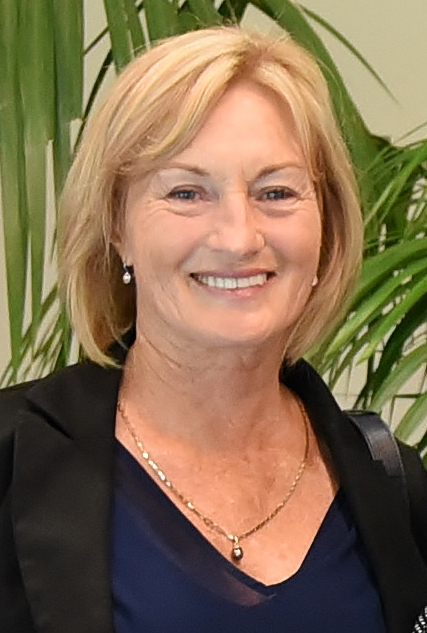
- Roe in 2017

Personal information
- Born: Allison Pamela Deed; 30 May 1956 (age 70) Auckland, New Zealand
- Spouse: Alan Barwick

Allison Pamela Roe MBE (née Deed; born 30 May 1956) is a New Zealand politician and former long-distance athlete.

== Athletics career ==
Roe was born in Auckland in 1956. In 1981, she won both the Boston Marathon and New York City Marathon, becoming the second of only two women to accomplish the feat in the same year. In Boston, she ran 2:26:46 to improve the course record by almost eight minutes, set the previous year by Jacqueline Gareau. In New York, she set a world best women's marathon time with 2:25:29, to break Grete Waitz's time of 2:25:42 from the 1980 New York Marathon. However, after re-measurement, the 1981 course was found to be 150 metres short, though Waitz's 1980 record is also disputed. Also in 1981, she set a 20 km world record in Miyazaki, Japan.

In the 1993 Queen's Birthday Honours, Roe was appointed a Member of the Order of the British Empire, for services to athletics. In 2010, she was inducted into the New Zealand Sports Hall of Fame.

== Political career ==
In the 2013 Auckland elections, Roe was elected to the Waitematā District Health Board and the Devonport-Takapuna Local Board. In the 2016 elections, Roe joined the Rodney First ticket and stood for re-election for the Health Board and election to the Rodney Local Board. She was successful in both contests with the second most popular and most popular votes respectively.

== Achievements ==
- All results regarding marathon, unless stated otherwise

Representing New Zealand
Year	Competition	Venue	Position	Notes
1980	Tokyo Marathon	Tokyo, Japan	4th	2:42:24
1981	Auckland Marathon	Auckland, New Zealand	1st	2:36:16
1981	Boston Marathon	Boston, United States	1st	2:26:46
1981	Peachtree Road Race 10 km	Atlanta, Georgia	1st	32:38
1981	City2Surf 14 km	Sydney, Australia	1st	47:36
1981	New York City Marathon	New York, United States	1st	2:25:29
1982	Seoul Marathon	Seoul, South Korea	1st	2:43:12
2017	World Masters Games (Mountain Biking)	Auckland, New Zealand	1st	1:12:11

Awards
Preceded by Richard Hadlee	New Zealand Sportsman of the Year; 1981	Succeeded by 1982 New Zealand men's eight
