= Wedau =

Rowing venue in Duisburg, Germany

Coordinates: 51.4102°N 6.7877°E

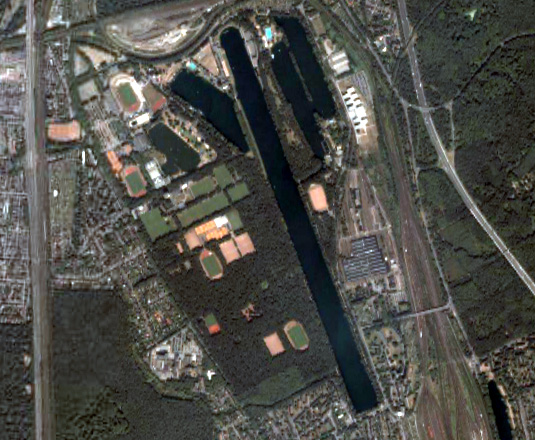
Satellite view of course, 2006

The Wedau (German pronunciation: [ˈveːdaʊ]) Regatta Course is an artificial rowing/canoeing lake in Duisburg, Germany.

The Course was built in 1935 and has hosted numerous international watersports events since its construction. Including the 1983 World Rowing Championships. It has also served as host of the ICF Canoe Sprint World Championships on a number of occasions.

The Lake is 2,150m long and 135m wide and up to 9m deep.

The Course has a permanent grandstand, TV camera positions, and is in the process of building a warm-up lane, which should mean it will again play host to international rowing events such as the Rowing World Cup.

It is situated South of the main city next to the MSV Arena.
