= New Zealand Sports Hall of Fame =

- Description: Institution honoring and preserving the history of New Zealand's greatest sporting achievements and athletes
- Location: Dunedin
- Country: New Zealand
- Presented by: New Zealand Sports Hall of Fame
- Website: http://www.nzhalloffame.co.nz

The New Zealand Sports Hall of Fame is an organisation commemorating New Zealand's greatest sporting triumphs. It was inaugurated as part of the New Zealand sesquicentenary celebrations in 1990.

== Inductions and membership ==
Some 160 members have been inducted into the hall of fame since its inception representing a wide variety of sports. Inductions are held regularly every second year.

Since 1999, it has been located in Dunedin, in the city's railway station building, where a museum is sited displaying mementos of New Zealand's sporting achievements. Prior to this time the Hall of Fame was based in Wellington.

Sports writer Joseph Romanos was the chief executive of the Hall of Fame from 1995 to 1998. From 1998 until shortly before his death in August 2023 the chief executive was sports writer Ron Palenski.

After September 2021 the museum could have to close or move to another city unless a new sponsor was found.

== Inductees ==
=== Individuals ===
The following individuals have been inducted into the New Zealand Sports Hall of Fame:

Year	Inductee	Sporting field
1990	Jean Batten	Aviation
1990	Ces Blazey	Administration
1990	Lofty Blomfield	Wrestling
1990	Chris Bouzaid	Yachting
1990	Godfrey Bowen	Shearing
1990	Barry Briggs	Motorsport
1990	Maurice Brownlie	Rugby union
1990	Malcolm Champion	Swimming
1990	Bob Charles	Golf
1990	Bert Cooke	Rugby union
1990	Lance Cross	Administration
1990	Stewie Dempster	Cricket
1990	Martin Donnelly	Cricket
1990	Bruce Farr	Yachting
1990	Dave Gerrard	Swimming
1990	Linda Jones	Thoroughbred racing
1990	Darcy Hadfield	Rowing
1990	Murray Halberg	Athletics
1990	Bill Hamilton	Jetboating
1990	Joan Harnett	Netball
1990	Edmund Hillary	Mountaineering
1990	Maurice Holmes	Harness racing
1990	Kevin Herlihy	Softball
1990	Gary Hurring	Swimming
1990	Naomi James	Yachting
1990	Ian Kirkpatrick	Rugby union
1990	Stan Lay	Athletics
1990	Brian Lochore	Rugby union
1990	Jack Lovelock	Athletics
1990	Arthur Lydiard	Athletics
1990	Winston McCarthy	Sports broadcasting
1990	Clark McConachy	Billiards
1990	Bruce McLaren	Motorsport
1990	Colin Meads	Rugby union
1990	Les Mills	Athletics
1990	Ted Morgan	Boxing
1990	Cecil Mountford	Rugby league
1990	Billy Murphy	Boxing
1990	George Nēpia	Rugby union
1990	Don Oliver	Weightlifting
1990	Onny Parun	Tennis
1990	Rebecca Perrott	Swimming
1990	Arthur Porritt	Athletics
1990	Dick Quax	Athletics
1990	Norman Read	Athletics
1990	John R. Reid	Cricket
1990	Eve Rimmer	Disabled sport
1990	Rusty Robertson	Rowing
1990	Jeff Robson	Badminton / tennis
1990	Bob Scott	Rugby union
1990	Bill Skelton	Thoroughbred racing
1990	Phil Skoglund	Lawn bowls
1990	Peter Snell	Athletics
1990	Jean Stewart	Swimming
1990	Bert Sutcliffe	Cricket
1990	Dick Tayler	Athletics
1990	Glenn Turner	Cricket
1990	John Walker	Athletics
1990	Billy Wallace	Rugby union
1990	Wilson Whineray	Rugby union
1990	Des White	Rugby league
1990	Anthony Wilding	Tennis
1990	Elsie Wilkie	Lawn bowls
1990	Roy Williams	Athletics
1990	Yvette Williams	Athletics
1990	Val Young	Athletics
1993	Susan Devoy	Squash
1993	Ian Ferguson	Canoeing
1993	Richard Hadlee	Cricket
1993	Denny Hulme	Motorsport
1993	Lois Muir	Netball
1993	Mark Todd	Equestrian
1995	Fred Allen	Rugby union
1995	Chris Amon	Motorsport
1995	Hugh Anderson	Motorsport
1995	Richard Arnst	Rowing
1995	Erin Baker	Multisport
1995	Marise Chamberlain	Athletics
1995	Don Clarke	Rugby union
1995	Graeme Crosby	Motorsport
1995	Leonard Cuff	Administration
1995	Barrie Devenport	Swimming
1995	Bob Fitzsimmons	Boxing
1995	Dave Gallaher	Rugby union
1995	Philippa Gould	Swimming
1995	Walter Hadlee	Cricket
1995	Stan Hill	Basketball
1995	Ron Jarden	Rugby union
1995	Stuart Jones	Golf
1995	Ronnie Moore	Motorsport
1995	Anthony Mosse	Swimming
1995	Kathleen Nunneley	Tennis
1995	Joe Scott	Athletics
1995	Bob Skelton	Thoroughbred racing
1995	George Smith	Athletics / rugby league / rugby union
1995	Eric Tindill	Cricket / rugby union
1995	Kel Tremain	Rugby union
1995	Peter Wolfenden	Harness racing
1996	Albert Baskerville	Rugby league
1996	Tommy Baxter	Rugby league
1996	Bill Broughton	Thoroughbred racing
1996	Jack Cowie	Cricket
1996	Rod Dixon	Athletics
1996	Mark Graham	Rugby league
1996	Tom Heeney	Boxing
1996	Oliver Hollis	Golf
1996	Harry Kerr	Athletics
1996	Chris Lewis	Tennis
1996	Tom Lowry	Cricket
1996	Cecil Matthews	Athletics
1996	Jenny McDonald	Field hockey
1996	Meda McKenzie	Swimming
1996	Graham Mourie	Rugby union
1996	Philip Rush	Swimming
1996	Billy Savidan	Athletics
1996	Charlie Seeling	Rugby union
1996	Ned Shewry	Woodchopping
1996	Kevin Skinner	Rugby union
1996	Waimarama Taumaunu	Netball
1996	Alan Thompson	Canoeing
1996	Bryan Williams	Rugby union
1997	Cecil Devine	Harness racing
1997	Jim Ellis	Thoroughbred racing
1997	Karen Holliday	Cycling
1997	Paul MacDonald	Canoeing
1997	Marilyn Marshall	Football / softball
1997	Bill Massey	Softball
1997	Dick Motz	Cricket
1997	Dan Reese	Cricket
1997	Randolph Rose	Athletics
1997	Buck Shelford	Rugby union
1997	Ian Smith	Cricket
1997	Billy Webb	Rowing
1997	Cis Winstanley	Lawn bowls
1999	Tom Ellison	Rugby union
1999	Rita Fatialofa	Netball
1999	Grant Fox	Rugby union
1999	Ivan Mauger	Motorsport
1999	Mark Nicholls	Rugby union
2001	Martin Crowe	Cricket
2001	Sandra Edge	Netball
2003	Peter Blake	Yachting
2003	Annelise Coberger	Skiing
2003	Sean Fitzpatrick	Rugby union
2005	Duncan Laing	Swimming
2005	Danyon Loader	Swimming
2005	Wynton Rufer	Football
2006	Gary Anderson	Cycling
2008	Lorraine Moller	Athletics
2008	Mike Ryan	Athletics
2009	Anne Audain	Athletics
2009	Ross Norman	Squash
2010	Barry Magee	Athletics
2010	Allison Roe	Athletics
2011	Bill Baillie	Athletics
2011	Michael Jones	Rugby union
2012	John Kirwan	Rugby union
2013	Bruce Kendall	Yachting
2013	Jeff Wilson	Rugby union
2014	Jonah Lomu	Rugby union
2014	Sarah Ulmer	Cycling
2015	Barbara Kendall	Yachting
2015	Stacey Jones	Rugby league
2016	Lance O'Sullivan	Thoroughbred racing
2016	Don Rowlands	Rowing
2016	Lesley Rumball	Netball
2016	Mark Sorenson	Softball
2017	Don Jowett	Athletics
2017	Rob Waddell	Rowing
2017	Ruben Wiki	Rugby league
2018	Beatrice Faumuina	Athletics
2020	Sid Going	Rugby union
2022	Ron Palenski	Sports journalism
2026	Valerie Adams	Athletics
2026	Richie McCaw	Rugby union

=== Teams ===
The following teams have been inducted into the New Zealand Sports Hall of Fame:

Year	Inductee	Sporting field
1990	1905 All Blacks	Rugby union
1990	1924 All Blacks	Rugby union
1990	1968 New Zealand coxed four	Rowing
1990	1971–1972 New Zealand eight	Rowing
1990	1976 New Zealand men's hockey team	Field hockey
1990	Peter Mander and Jack Cropp	Yachting
1990	Helmer Pedersen and Earle Wells	Yachting
1995	1982 New Zealand eight	Rowing
1995	1987 All Blacks	Rugby union
1996	1967 New Zealand netball team	Netball
1996	1987 New Zealand netball team	Netball
1997	1945–1946 2NZEF rugby team	Rugby union
1999	1982 New Zealand women's softball team	Softball
2005	1975 New Zealand men's crosscountry team	Athletics
2012	Philippa Baker and Brenda Lawson	Rowing
