= Rotsee =

Lake in Lucerne, Switzerland

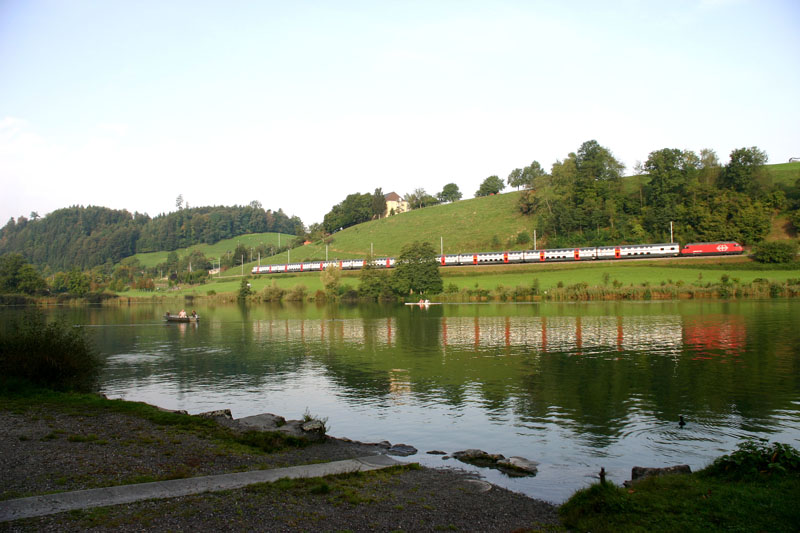
- Rotsee, with a train on the Zug–Lucerne railway in the background

- Location within Canton of Lucerne Location within Switzerland Location within Alps
- Interactive map of Rotsee
- Location: Canton of Lucerne
- Coordinates: 47°04′11″N 8°18′51″E
- Primary outflows: Ron
- Basin countries: Switzerland
- Max. length: 2.5 km (1.6 mi)
- Max. width: 0.3 km (0.19 mi)
- Surface area: 0.48 km^{2} (0.19 sq mi)
- Max. depth: 16 m (52 ft)
- Surface elevation: 419 m (1,375 ft)
- Settlements: Lucerne, Ebikon

The Rotsee (Swiss Standard German pronunciation: [ˈroːtˌzeː]; previously known as Rootsee) is a natural rowing lake on the northern edge of Lucerne, Switzerland. It is regarded as one of the best rowing venues in the world.

== Description and location ==
The lake and its surrounding area is used for local recreation. All of the lake frontage is a protected area. The lake formed through glacial processes and it is thought that the river Reuss flowed through this valley in between ice ages. There is no notable inflow and virtually no current. Nearby hills protect the lake from wind. It is 2,400 metres (7,900 ft) long. These factors make it an ideal rowing venue and German-speaking rowers refer to it as Göttersee, which translates as "lake of the gods". The expression was coined at the 1962 World Rowing Championships by a Japanese rowing official.

The Zug–Lucerne railway is located north of the lake. The south side of the lake has residential land use. The Ron is a 10-kilometre-long (6.2 mi) creek that is the lake's outflow; it flows into the Reuss at Root.

== History ==
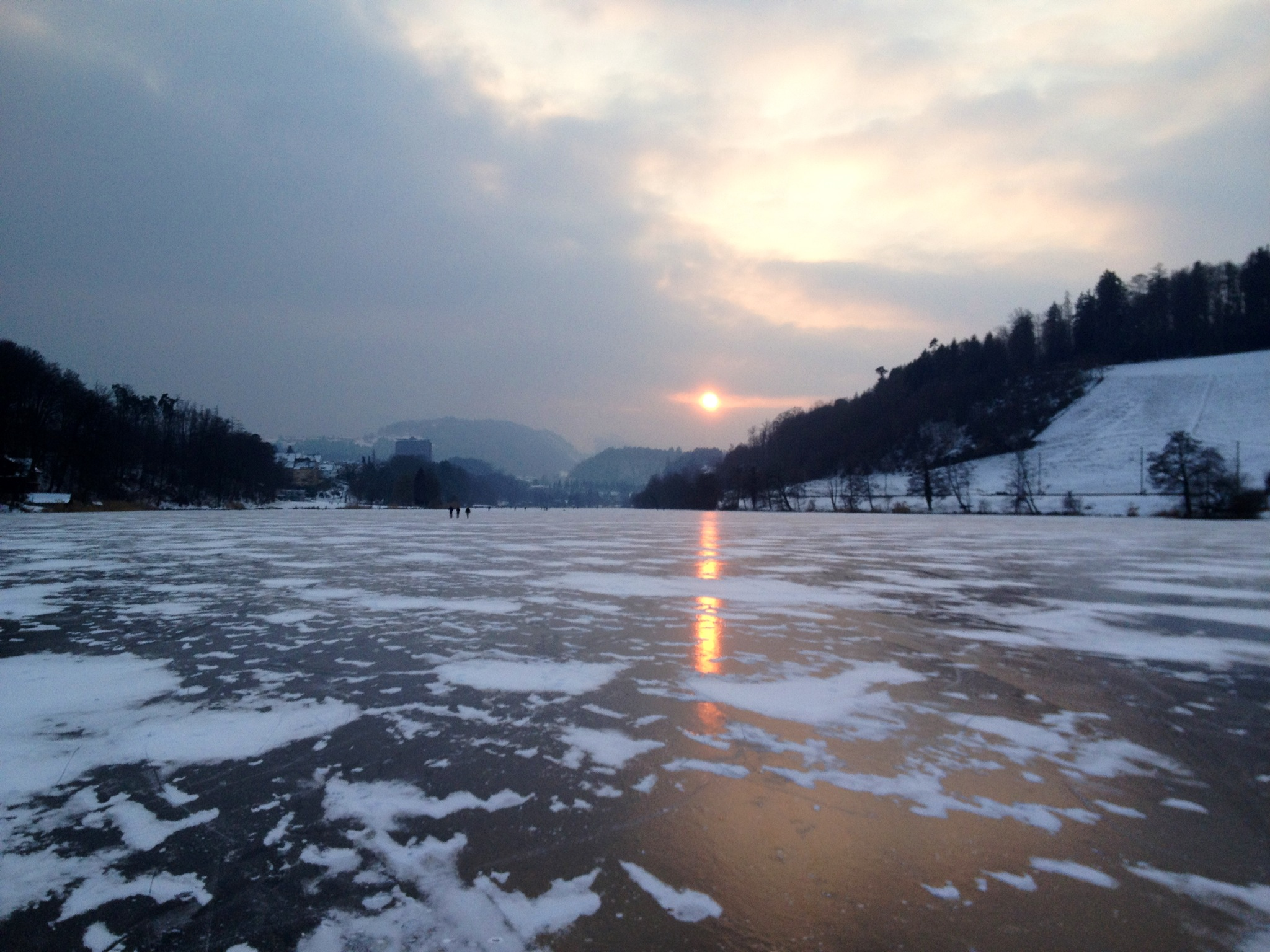
Frozen Rotsee in 2012

Since 1885, the Rotsee was used for ice cutting, which was stored in insulated cellars lasting until autumn. Up to 80 people were employed, with the ice used by the hotel industry and brewers. This business ceased during the 1910s when refrigerators became more economical. With its proximity to Lucerne, the Rotsee and its surrounding area has been used for local recreation since the mid 18th century. An army ammunition depot next to the Rotsee exploded in 1916, resulting in five deaths and thousands of grenades being thrown in the lake. Recreational divers spotted some grenades during the 1970s and Police divers have since recovered about 1000 grenades from the lake. Police and army last found grenades in 2020 and it is assumed that there are still more explosives in the lake.

Increasing housing in the area, with sewage discharge into the lake, resulted in ecological decline. The sewage treatment plants built at the lake in 1922 and 1929 belonged to the first installations in Switzerland, but the tension about ecological decline peaked in the 1920s. This gave rise to the founding of a society Gesellschaft Pro Rotsee in 1929 with the aim of saving the lake. In 1922, a canal was built that diverted water from the river Reuss into the Rotsee, but since the Reuss was also polluted, this did not significantly improve water quality. Significant improvements were achieved in 1974, when all domestic discharge was diverted to the new sewage treatment plant in Schiltwald (part of Emmen).

The society was eventually given a lease of the lake by the city of Lucerne. The name of the society has since changed to Quartierverein Maihof, which leases the lake to this day.

== Rowing ==
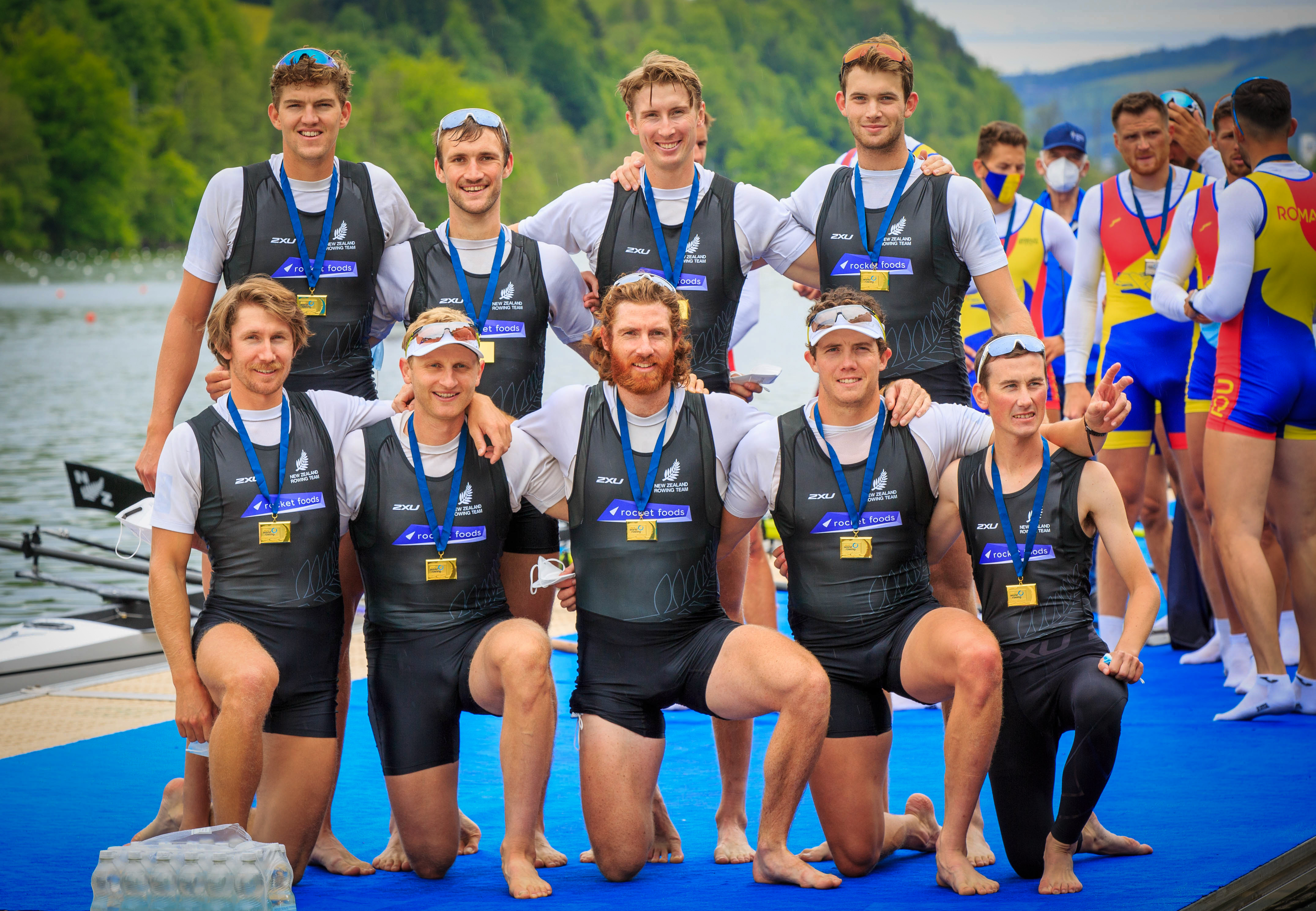
The New Zealand men's eight, gold medal winners in Tokyo, at the Rotsee in May 2021

The Swiss national rowing championships, the first regatta on the Rotsee, was hosted in 1933. European Rowing Championships were held here in 1934 and 1947, and again in 2019. The inaugural World Rowing Championships were held in 1962, with subsequent world championships in 1974, 1982 and 2001. The Final Olympic Qualification Regatta (FOQR) was held at the Rotsee in May 2021 as a qualification event for the 2020 Tokyo Olympics.

The lake is the venue for the final leg of the World Rowing Cup series. When a World Championships is also being held in Lucerne (as happened in 2001) then no World Cup race is held on the lake.

== See also ==
- List of lakes of Switzerland
