= New Zealand at the 1962 British Empire and Commonwealth Games =

- CG code: NZL
- CGA: New Zealand Olympic and British Empire Games Association
- Website: www.olympic.org.nz

in Perth, Western Australia
- Competitors: 85 in 9 sports
- Flag bearers: Opening: Murray Halberg; Closing:
- Officials: 11
- Medals Ranked 3rd: Gold 10 Silver 12 Bronze 10 Total 32

British Empire and Commonwealth Games appearances
- 1930; 1934; 1938; 1950; 1954; 1958; 1962; 1966; 1970; 1974; 1978; 1982; 1986; 1990; 1994; 1998; 2002; 2006; 2010; 2014; 2018; 2022; 2026; 2030

New Zealand at the 1962 British Empire and Commonwealth Games was represented by a team of 85 competitors and 11 officials. Selection of the team for the Games in Perth, Western Australia, was the responsibility of the New Zealand Olympic and British Empire Games Association. New Zealand's flagbearer at the opening ceremony was runner Murray Halberg. The New Zealand team finished third on the medal table, winning a total of 32 medals, ten of which were gold.

New Zealand has competed in every games, starting with the British Empire Games in 1930 at Hamilton, Ontario.

== Medal tables ==
New Zealand was third in the medal table in 1962, with a total of 32 medals, including 10 gold.

Medal	Name	Sport	Event
Gold	Murray Halberg	Athletics	Men's 3 miles
Gold	Peter Snell	Athletics	Men's 880 yards
Gold	Peter Snell	Athletics	Men's 1 mile
Gold	Valerie Young	Athletics	Women's discus throw
Gold	Valerie Young	Athletics	Women's shot put
Gold	Bob McDonald; Robbie Robson	Lawn bowls	Men's pairs
Gold	Wallace Coe	Boxing	Men's welterweight
Gold	Melody Coleman	Fencing	Women's individual foil
Gold	Keith Heselwood; George Paterson; Doug Pulman (cox); Hugh Smedley; Winston Stephens	Rowing	Men's coxed four
Gold	James Hill	Rowing	Men's single scull
Silver	Marise Chamberlain	Athletics	Women's 880 yards
Silver	John Davies	Athletics	Men's 1 mile
Silver	Dave Norris	Athletics	Men's long jump
Silver	Doreen Porter	Athletics	Women's 100 yards
Silver	Bill Kini	Boxing	Men's heavyweight
Silver	Warren Johnston	Cycling	Men's 10 miles
Silver	Anthony Walsh	Cycling	Men's road race
Silver	Leslie Arthur; Darien Boswell; Colin Cordes; Alistair Dryden; Alan Grey; Christian Larsen; Louis Lobel; Robert Page (cox); Alan Webster	Rowing	Men's eight
Silver	Graham Lawrence; Murray Lawrence	Rowing	Men's coxless pair
Silver	Murray Watkinson; Peter Watkinson	Rowing	Men's double scull
Silver	Vivien Haddon	Swimming	Women's 100 yards breaststroke
Silver	Don Oliver	Weightlifting	Men's heavyweight
Bronze	Nola Bond; Yvonne Cowan; Avis McIntosh; Doreen Porter	Athletics	Women's 4 × 110 yards relay
Bronze	Avis McIntosh	Athletics	Women's 80 m hurdles
Bronze	Paddy Donovan	Boxing	Men's lightweight
Bronze	Turori George	Boxing	Men's featherweight
Bronze	Laurie Byers	Cycling	Men's road race
Bronze	Bob Binning; Michael Henderson; Brian Pickworth	Fencing	Men's sabre team
Bronze	Vivien Haddon	Swimming	Women's 220 yards breaststroke
Bronze	Alan Robertson	Swimming	Men's 220 yards backstroke
Bronze	Warren Nisbet	Wrestling	Men's flyweight
Bronze	Fred Thomas	Wrestling	Men's middleweight

Medals by sport
Sport	Gold medal	Silver medal	Bronze medal	Total
Athletics	5	4	2	11
Rowing	2	3	0	5
Boxing	1	1	2	4
Fencing	1	0	1	2
Lawn bowls	1	0	0	1
Cycling	0	2	1	3
Swimming	0	1	2	3
Weightlifting	0	1	0	1
Wrestling	0	0	2	2
Total	10	12	10	32

Medals by gender
Gender	Gold medal	Silver medal	Bronze medal	Total
Male	7	9	7	23
Female	3	3	3	9
Total	10	12	10	32

== Competitors ==
The following table lists the number of New Zealand competitors participating at the Games according to gender and sport.

Sport	Men	Women	Total
Athletics	17	8	25
Boxing	5	—N/a	5
Cycling	7	—N/a	7
Fencing	4	2	6
Lawn bowls	7	—N/a	7
Rowing	21	—N/a	21
Swimming	3	5	8
Weightlifting	2	—N/a	2
Wrestling	4	—N/a	4
Total	70	15	85

== Athletics ==
=== Track and road ===
Athlete	Event	Heat		Semifinal		Final	
Athlete	Event	Result	Rank (Note: Ranks given are within the heat)	Result	Rank (Note: Ranks given are within the semifinal)	Result	Rank
Logan Aikman	Men's 120 yd hurdles	15.6	4	—N/a		Did not advance	
Logan Aikman	Men's 440 yd hurdles	56.2	5	—N/a		Did not advance	
Bill Baillie	Men's 1 mile	DNS		—N/a		Did not advance	
Bill Baillie	Men's 3 miles	—N/a				DNS	
Bill Baillie	Men's 6 miles	—N/a				DNF	
Nola Bond	Women's 100 yd	11.2	3 Q	11.2	6	Did not advance	
Nola Bond	Women's 220 yd	25.5	3 Q	25.4	5	Did not advance	
Marise Chamberlain	Women's 880 yd	—N/a				2:05.7	2nd place, silver medalist(s)
Yvonne Cowan	Women's 100 yd	11.6	4	Did not advance			
Yvonne Cowan	Women's 220 yd	25.0	3 Q	25.0	5	Did not advance	
Paul Dallow	Men's 120 yd hurdles	15.1	3	—N/a		Did not advance	
Paul Dallow	Men's 440 yd hurdles	DNF		—N/a		Did not advance	
John Davies	Men's 880 yd	1:51.1	1 Q	1:51.5	4	Did not advance	
John Davies	Men's 1 mile	4:06.7	2 Q	—N/a		4:05.1	2nd place, silver medalist(s)
Murray Halberg	Men's 3 miles	—N/a				13:34.2	1st place, gold medalist(s)
Jeff Julian	Men's 6 miles	—N/a				29:50.0	10
Jeff Julian	Men's marathon	—N/a				2:30:13	7
Barry Magee	Men's 6 miles	—N/a				28:41.0	4
Barry Magee	Men's marathon	—N/a				DNS	
Avis McIntosh	Women's 80 m hurdles	10.8	1 Q	—N/a		11.4	3rd place, bronze medalist(s)
Edward O'Keefe	Men's 3000 m steeplechase	—N/a				9:05.8	6
Gary Philpott	Men's 880 yd	1:52.6	3	Did not advance			
Doreen Porter	Women's 100 yd	10.9	1 Q	11.0	2 Q	11.3	2nd place, silver medalist(s)
Doreen Porter	Women's 220 yd	24.7	1 Q	24.6	3 Q	24.8	6
Barry Robinson	Men's 440 yd	48.6	2 Q	49.4	6	Did not advance	
Peter Snell	Men's 880 yd	1:50.7	1 Q	1:50.5	1 Q	1:47.6 GR	1st place, gold medalist(s)
Peter Snell	Men's 1 mile	4:02.4	2 Q	—N/a		4:04.6	1st place, gold medalist(s)
Nola Bond; Yvonne Cowan; Avis McIntosh; Doreen Porter	Women's 4 × 110 yd relay	—N/a				46.9	3rd place, bronze medalist(s)
Dave Norris; Gary Philpott; Barry Robinson; Peter Snell	Men's 4 × 440 yd relay	3:17.3	4	—N/a		Did not advance	

=== Field ===
Athlete	Event	Final	
Athlete	Event	Result	Rank
Pam Burnett	Women's high jump	5 ft 3 in (1.60 m)	10
Lorraine Curtis	Women's high jump	5 ft 5 in (1.65 m)	8
Kevin Gibbons	Men's pole vault	13 ft 0 in (3.96 m)	11
Dave Leech	Men's hammer throw	166 ft 5 1/2 in (50.74 m)	7
Darcy McGonagle	Men's pole vault	13 ft 0 in (3.96 m)	7
Les Mills	Men's discus throw	162 ft 0 in (49.38 m)	5
Les Mills	Men's shot put	51 ft 10 1/2 in (15.81 m)	6
Dave Norris	Men's long jump	25 ft 4 3/4 in (7.74 m)	2nd place, silver medalist(s)
Dave Norris	Men's triple jump	50 ft 6 1/2 in (15.41 m)	6
Robin Tait	Men's discus throw	165 ft 8 1/2 in (50.51 m)	4
Robin Tait	Men's shot put	46 ft 8 in (14.22 m)	12
Valerie Young	Women's discus throw	164 ft 8 1/2 in (50.20 m) GR	1st place, gold medalist(s)
Valerie Young	Women's shot put	49 ft 11 1/2 in (15.23 m)	1st place, gold medalist(s)

== Boxing ==
Athlete	Event	Round of 16	Quarterfinal	Semifinal	Final	Rank
Athlete	Event	Opposition Result	Opposition Result	Opposition Result	Opposition Result	Rank
Turori George	Featherweight	—N/a	Pretorius (FRN); W	Juma (KEN); L	Did not advance	3rd place, bronze medalist(s)
Paddy Donovan	Lightweight	Bye	Hopkins (PNG); W	Blay (GHA); L	Did not advance	3rd place, bronze medalist(s)
Wallace Coe	Welterweight	—N/a	Sharif (PAK); W	Rice (NIR); W	Pritchett (ENG); W	1st place, gold medalist(s)
John Logan	Light heavyweight	Holmes (JAM); L	did not advance			
Bill Kini	Heavyweight	—N/a	Bye	Robinson (AUS); W	Oywello (UGA); L	2nd place, silver medalist(s)

== Cycling ==
=== Road ===
Men's road race

Athlete	Time	Rank
Laurie Byers	5:20:27.2	3rd place, bronze medalist(s)
Dick Johnstone	Not recorded	9
Richie Thomson	unplaced	
Anthony Walsh	5:20:27.0	2nd place, silver medalist(s)

=== Track ===
Men's 1000 m sprint

Athlete	Round 1	Repechage	Round 2	Repechage	Quarterfinals	Semifinals	Final / BM	
Athlete	Opposition Result	Opposition Result	Opposition Result	Opposition Result	Opposition Result	Opposition Result	Opposition Result	Rank
Warren Johnston	Rosli (MAL); W 12.3	Bye	Hunter (FRN); W 12.3	Bye	Whitfield (ENG); W 12.2, W 11.8	Harrison (AUS); L, W 11.9, L	Browne (AUS); L, W 13.0, L	4

Men's 1 km time trial

Athlete	Time	Rank
Graham Wright	1:13.6	=4

Men's 4000 m individual pursuit

Athlete	Qualification		Quarterfinals	Semifinals	Final / BM	Rank
Athlete	Time	Rank	Opponent Result	Opponent Result	Opponent Result	Rank
Arthur Candy	5:27.9	5 Q	McCoy (ENG); L 5:24.6	did not advance		

Men's 10 miles scratch race

Athlete	Time	Rank
Arthur Candy		unplaced
Warren Johnston		2nd place, silver medalist(s)
Graham Wright		unplaced

== Fencing ==
=== Men ===
==== Individual ====
Épée

Athlete	Elimination pool					Final pool									Rank
Athlete	Opposition Result	Opposition Result	Opposition Result	Opposition Result	Wins	Opposition Result	Opposition Result	Opposition Result	Opposition Result	Opposition Result	Opposition Result	Opposition Result	Opposition Result	Wins	Rank
Bob Binning	Schwende (CAN); L 2–5	King (SCO); L 3–5	Howard (ENG); W 5–3	Diamond (AUS); L 2–5	1	Did not advance									
Keith Mann	Foxcroft (CAN); W 5–2	Da Costa (HKG); W 3–2	Play stopped as result could not be affected		2	Schwende (CAN); W 5–4	Humphreys (AUS); L 3–5	Diamond (AUS); L 3–5	Lund (AUS); L 2–5	Reynolds (WAL); L 2–5	King (SCO); W 5–4	Jacobs (ENG); L 4–5	Pelling (ENG); W 4–5	3	7

Foil

Athlete	Elimination pool							Final pool									Rank
Athlete	Opposition Result	Opposition Result	Opposition Result	Opposition Result	Opposition Result	Opposition Result	Wins	Opposition Result	Opposition Result	Opposition Result	Opposition Result	Opposition Result	Opposition Result	Opposition Result	Opposition Result	Wins	Rank
Michael Henderson	Paul (ENG); L 3–5	McCowage (AUS); L 4–5	Da Costa (HKG); W 5–2	Reynolds (WAL); L 4–5	Leckie (SCO); L 1–5	—N/a	1	Did not advance									
Keith Mann	Jay (ENG); L 1–2	Lund (AUS); L 1–5	King (SCO); W 5–1	Evans (WAL); W 5–3	Simo (CAN); L 1–5	—N/a	2	Did not advance									
Brian Pickworth	Cooperman (ENG); W 5–1	Andru (CAN); L 1–5	Maunder (WAL); W 5–3	Marcal (HKG); W 5–2	McKenzie (AUS); W 5–4	Crellin (IOM); W 5–0	5	Leckie (SCO); L 3–5	Lund (AUS); W 5–3	McCowage (AUS); W 5–3	Paul (ENG); L 3–5	Andru (CAN); W 5–1	Simo (CAN); W 5–4	Jay (ENG); L 1–5	Cooperman (ENG); L 3–5	4	5

Sabre

Athlete	Elimination pool						Final pool									Rank
Athlete	Opposition Result	Opposition Result	Opposition Result	Opposition Result	Opposition Result	Wins	Opposition Result	Opposition Result	Opposition Result	Opposition Result	Opposition Result	Opposition Result	Opposition Result	Opposition Result	Wins	Rank
Bob Binning	Andru (CAN); W 5–1	Amberg (ENG); L 4–5	Traynor (AUS); L 3–5	Marcal (HKG); W 5–3	Evans (WAL); W 5–2	3	Pickworth (NZL); L 4–5	McCombe (WAL); W 5–3	Tornallyay (AUS); W 5–3	Birks (ENG); W 5–2	Amberg (ENG); L 2–5	Cooperman (ENG); L 2–5	Simo (CAN); W 5–2	Andru (CAN); L 3–5	4	=4
Michael Henderson	Simo (CAN); L 4–5	Tornallyay (AUS); L 1–5	Cooperman (ENG); L 3–5	King (SCO); W 5–0	Maunder (WAL); L 0–5	1	Did not advance									
Brian Pickworth	Leckie (SCO); W 5–4	Birks (ENG); W 5–4	Sommerville (AUS); L 4–5	McCombe (WAL); L 4–5	Foxcroft (CAN); W 5–3	3 (Note: Pickworth, McCombe and Sommerville all had 3 wins in the pool. After a barrage round, they were still equal on wins, but Pickworth and McCombes achieved more hits during the barrage round and progressed to the final pool with Birks.)	Binning (NZL); W 5–4	Tornallyay (AUS); W 5–2	McCombe (WAL); W 5–1	Andru (CAN); L 4–5	Birks (ENG); W 5–4	Amberg (ENG); L 4–5	Cooperman (ENG); L 1–5	Simo (CAN); L 3–5	4	=4

==== Team ====
Athletes	Event	Final pool						Rank
Athletes	Event	Opposition Result	Opposition Result	Opposition Result	Opposition Result	Wins	Losses	Rank
Bob Binning; Keith Mann; Brian Pickworth	Team épée	Canada; L 2–7	Wales; L 4–5	England; L 0–9	Australia; L 4–4 (35–36 hits)	0	4	5
Michael Henderson; Keith Mann; Brian Pickworth	Team foil	England; L 3–6	Wales; L 3–6	Canada; L 2–6	Australia; L 3–6	0	4	5
Bob Binning; Michael Henderson; Brian Pickworth	Team sabre	Australia; W 6–3	England; L 2–7	Canada; L 4–5	Wales; W 7–2	2	2	3rd place, bronze medalist(s)

=== Women ===
Individual foil

Athlete	Final pool								Rank
Athlete	Opposition Result	Opposition Result	Opposition Result	Opposition Result	Opposition Result	Opposition Result	Opposition Result	Wins	Rank
Dot Coleman	Tomich (NZL); W 4–1	Ellis (WAL); W 4–3	Offredy (ENG); W 4–1	Winter (AUS); W 4–2	Hopner (NZL); L 1–4	Sheen (ENG); W 4–2	Reynolds (WAL); W 4–1	6	1st place, gold medalist(s)
Rosemary Tomich	Coleman (NZL); L 1–4	Hopner (NZL); W 4–1	Ellis (WAL); W 4–2	Sheen (ENG); L 2–4	Offredy (ENG); W 4–0	Reynolds (WAL); W 4–2	Winter (AUS); L 0–4	4	4

== Lawn bowls ==
Athlete	Event	Round robin																Rank
Athlete	Event	Opposition Score	Opposition Score	Opposition Score	Opposition Score	Opposition Score	Opposition Score	Opposition Score	Opposition Score	Opposition Score	Opposition Score	Opposition Score	Opposition Score	Opposition Score	W	D	L	Rank
Jeff Barron	Men's singles	Page (PNG); W 22–8	Black (SCO); L 20–21	Fitzpatrick (AUS); L 16–21	Watson (NIR); L 19–22	Shields (CAN); W 22–8	Henry (FIJ); W 22–12	Askew (JER); W 21–5	Evans (WAL); W 21–16	Bye	Kermani (HKG); L 17–21	Bradley (FRN); L 14–21	Noon (KEN); W 21–10	Bryant (ENG); L 16–21	6	0	6	=6
Bob McDonald; Robbie Robson	Men's pairs	Hong Kong; W 23–18	Rhodesia and Nyasaland; W 31–12	Australia; W 19–18	England; W 23–19	Bye	Scotland; L 23–25	Papua New Guinea; W 31–7	Kenya; W 27–7	Canada; W 27–20	Wales; W 36–7	Fiji; W 25–10	—N/a		9	0	1	1st place, gold medalist(s)
Jack Rabone; Malcolm Boon; Ted Pilkington; Bill O'Neill	Men's fours	Rhodesia and Nyasaland; L 15–21	England; L 15–24	Scotland; L 5–24	Hong Kong; W 31–20	Canada; W 27–7	Papua New Guinea; W 40–11	Australia; L 18–20	Wales; W 27–9	Kenya; W 24–12	Bye	Fiji; W 25–9	—N/a		6	0	4	6

== Rowing ==
Athlete	Event	Heat		Repechage		Final	
Athlete	Event	Time	Rank (Note: Ranks given are within the heat)	Time	Rank (Note: Ranks given are within the repechage)	Time	Rank
James Hill	Men's single scull	—N/a				7:37.7	1st place, gold medalist(s)
Peter Watkinson; Murray Watkinson	Men's double scull	10:20.7	1	Bye		6:54.3	2nd place, silver medalist(s)
Murray Lawrence; Graham Lawrence	Men's coxless pair		2	7:43.2	1 Q	7:08.5	2nd place, silver medalist(s)
Colin Cordes; Geoffrey Benge; Louis Lobel; Rodney Hutchinson	Men's coxless four		2	7:05.0	3	did not advance	
Winston Stephens; Keith Heselwood; Hugh Smedley; George Paterson; Doug Pulman (cox)	Men's coxed four	—N/a				6:48.2	1st place, gold medalist(s)
Alistair Dryden; Alan Grey; Christian Larsen; Colin Cordes; Darien Boswell; Alan Webster; Louis Lobel; Leslie Arthur; Robert Page (cox)	Men's eight	7:07.5	1	Bye		5:53.6	2nd place, silver medalist(s)

== Swimming ==
Athlete	Event	Heat		Final	
Athlete	Event	Result	Rank	Result	Rank
Dave Gerrard	Men's 110 yd butterfly	—N/a		1:03.5	6
Dave Gerrard	Men's 220 yd butterfly	—N/a		2:21.7	5
Vivien Haddon	Women's 110 yd breaststroke	1:22.5	3 Q	1:21.3	2nd place, silver medalist(s)
Vivien Haddon	Women's 220 yd breaststroke	2:55.2	3 Q	2:56.3	3rd place, bronze medalist(s)
Margaret Macrae	Women's 110 yd backstroke	1:15.0	8 Q	1:14.9	7
Margaret Macrae	Women's 220 yd backstroke	2:41.6	5 Q	2:41.3	7
Lesley Moore	Women's 110 yd freestyle	1:08.5	13	did not advance	
Lesley Moore	Women's 440 yd freestyle	5:06.1	4 Q	5:09.3	6
Shirley Nicholson	Women's 110 yd freestyle	1:07.7	11	did not advance	
Shirley Nicholson	Women's 440 yd freestyle	5:13.0	8 Q	5:17.6	8
Alan Robertson	Men's 110 yd backstroke	1:07.3	4 Q	1:07.3	5
Alan Robertson	Men's 220 yd backstroke	2:23.9	3 Q	2:23.0	3rd place, bronze medalist(s)
Helen Rogers	Women's 110 yd butterfly	1:14.0	=6 Q	DNS	
Helen Rogers	Women's 440 yd individual medley	—N/a		5:58.3	4
Allan Seagar	Men's 110 yd backstroke	1:09.7	9	did not advance	
Allan Seagar	Men's 110 yd breaststroke	1:18.8	9	did not advance	
Allan Seagar	Men's 440 yd individual medley	5:19.8	3 Q	5:19.7	5
Helen Rogers; Lesley Moore; Margaret Macrae; Shirley Nicholson	Women's 4 × 110 yd freestyle relay	—N/a		4:34.6	5
Margaret Macrae; Helen Rogers; Vivien Haddon; Lesley Moore	Women's 4 × 110 yd medley relay	—N/a		4:57.2	4

== Weightlifting ==
Athlete	Event	Press	Snatch	Jerk	Total	Rank
William Scott	Middle heavyweight	250 lb (113.4 kg)	240 lb (108.9 kg)	310 lb (140.6 kg)	800 lb (362.9 kg)	6
Don Oliver	Heavyweight	325 lb (147.4 kg)	290 lb (131.5 kg)	410 lb (186.0 kg)	1,025 lb (464.9 kg)	2nd place, silver medalist(s)

== Wrestling ==
Despite losing both of his bouts, Warren Nisbet was awarded the bronze medal in the flyweight division after Trevor Dwyer of Australia was disqualified for being over weight.

Athlete	Event	Elimination rounds				Rank
Athlete	Event	Opposition Result	Opposition Result	Opposition Result	Opposition Result	Rank
Warren Nisbet	Flyweight	Dwyer (AUS); L	Michienzi (CAN); L	Eliminated		3rd place, bronze medalist(s)
Ifor Roberts	Featherweight	Ala-ud-Din (PAK); L	Aspen (ENG); L	Eliminated		
Barrie Courtney	Welterweight	Bashir (PAK); L	Oberlander (CAN); L WO	Eliminated		
Fred Thomas	Middleweight	Benarik (AUS); L	McNeill (SCO); W	Pidduck (FRN); W	Faiz (PAK); L	3rd place, bronze medalist(s)

== Officials ==
- Team manager – Colin Kay
- Assistant team manager – Ack Malcolm
- Chaperone – Doris Fitzsimmons
- Athletics
  - Section manager – Norrie Jefferson
  - Assistant section manager – Johnny Borland
- Boxing section manager – George Cammick
- Cycling section manager – Alvyn Pennington
- Fencing section manager – Murray Gittos
- Lawn bowls section manager – C. H. Hain
- Rowing
  - Section manager – Don Rowlands
  - Assistant section manager – Eric Craies
- Swimming section manager – Ron Shakespeare
- Weightlifting section manager – B. H. Webb
- Wrestling section manager – D. J. Cowie

== See also ==
- New Zealand at the 1960 Summer Olympics
- New Zealand at the 1964 Summer Olympics
