= New Zealand at the 1966 British Empire and Commonwealth Games =

- CGF code: NZL
- CGA: New Zealand Olympic and British Empire Games Association
- Website: www.olympic.org.nz

in Kingston, Jamaica
- Competitors: 60
- Flag bearers: Opening: Don Oliver; Closing:
- Officials: 18
- Medals Ranked 4th: Gold 8 Silver 5 Bronze 13 Total 26

British Empire and Commonwealth Games appearances
- 1930; 1934; 1938; 1950; 1954; 1958; 1962; 1966; 1970; 1974; 1978; 1982; 1986; 1990; 1994; 1998; 2002; 2006; 2010; 2014; 2018; 2022; 2026; 2030

New Zealand at the 1966 British Empire and Commonwealth Games was represented by a team of 60 competitors and 18 officials. Selection of the team for the Games in Kingston, Jamaica, was the responsibility of the New Zealand Olympic and British Empire Games Association. New Zealand's flagbearer at the opening ceremony was weightlifter Don Oliver. The New Zealand team finished fourth on the medal table, winning a total of 26 medals, eight of which were gold.

New Zealand has competed in every games, starting with the British Empire Games in 1930 at Hamilton, Ontario.

== Medal tables ==
New Zealand was fourth in the medal table in 1966, with a total of 26 medals, including eight gold.

Medal	Name	Sport	Event
Gold	Les Mills	Athletics	Men's discus throw
Gold	Peter Welsh	Athletics	Men's 3000 m steeplechase
Gold	Roy Williams	Athletics	Men's decathlon
Gold	Valerie Young	Athletics	Women's discus throw
Gold	Valerie Young	Athletics	Women's shot put
Gold	Bill Kini	Boxing	Men's heavyweight
Gold	Dave Gerrard	Swimming	Men's 220 yards butterfly
Gold	Don Oliver	Weightlifting	Men's heavyweight
Silver	Les Mills	Athletics	Men's shot put
Silver	Des Thomson	Cycling	Men's road race
Silver	Brian Lacey	Shooting	Open 50 m rifle prone
Silver	Tony Graham	Swimming	Men's 110 yards breaststroke
Silver	Tony Graham	Swimming	Men's 220 yards breaststroke
Bronze	Norman Read	Athletics	Men's 20 mile road walk
Bronze	Mike Ryan	Athletics	Men's marathon
Bronze	Ian Studd	Athletics	Men's 1 mile
Bronze	Robin Tait	Athletics	Men's discus throw
Bronze	Brian Kendall	Boxing	Men's bantamweight
Bronze	Laurie Byers	Cycling	Men's road race
Bronze	Gaye McDermit	Fencing	Women's individual foil
Bronze	Joyce Fenton; Pam French; Gaye McDermit	Fencing	Women's team foil
Bronze	Tom Sutherland	Shooting	Open fullbore rifle Queen's Prize
Bronze	Vivien Haddon	Swimming	Women's 220 yards breaststroke
Bronze	Margaret Macrae	Swimming	Women's 220 yards backstroke
Bronze	Hilton Brown; Dave Gerrard; Tony Graham; Paddy O'Carroll	Swimming	Men's 4 × 110 yards medley relay
Bronze	Tony Greig	Wrestling	Men's lightweight

Medals by sport
Sport	Gold medal	Silver medal	Bronze medal	Total
Athletics	5	1	4	10
Swimming	1	2	3	6
Boxing	1	0	1	2
Weightlifting	1	0	0	1
Cycling	0	1	1	2
Shooting	0	1	1	2
Fencing	0	0	2	2
Wrestling	0	0	1	1
Total	8	5	13	26

Medals by gender
Gender	Gold medal	Silver medal	Bronze medal	Total
Male	6	4	8	18
Female	2	0	4	6
Mixed / open	0	1	1	2
Total	8	5	13	26

== Competitors ==
The following table lists the number of New Zealand competitors participating at the Games according to gender and sport.

Sport	Men	Women	Total
Athletics	13	4	17
Badminton	2	2	4
Boxing	4	—N/a	4
Cycling	8	—N/a	8
Diving	1	0	1
Fencing	5	3	8
Shooting	4	0	4
Swimming	5	4	9
Weightlifting	3	—N/a	3
Wrestling	2	—N/a	2
Total	47	13	60

== Athletics ==
=== Track and road ===
Athlete	Event	Heat		Semifinal		Final	
Athlete	Event	Result	Rank (Note: Ranks given are within the heat)	Result	Rank (Note: Ranks given are within the semifinal)	Result	Rank
Bill Baillie	Men's 3 miles	—N/a				DNS	
Bill Baillie	Men's 6 miles	—N/a				30:01.0	9
Bill Baillie	Men's marathon	—N/a				DNS	
Roger Johnson	Men's 440 yards hurdles	51.7	4 Q	—N/a		56.0	7
Jeff Julian	Men's marathon	—N/a				2:32:45.4	5
Brenda Matthews	Women's 80 m hurdles	11.1	3 Q	—N/a		11.3	7
Brenda Matthews	Women's 100 yards	10.9	3 Q	10.8	6	did not advance	
Geoff Pyne	Men's 1 mile	4:04.5	3 Q	—N/a		4:03.2	10
Geoff Pyne	Men's 3 miles	—N/a				13:18.6	9
Norman Read	Men's 20 mile walk	—N/a				2:46:28.2	3rd place, bronze medalist(s)
Mike Ryan	Men's marathon	—N/a				2:27:59.0	3rd place, bronze medalist(s)
Marise Stephen	Women's 880 yards	2:06.6	1 Q	—N/a		2:05.9	6
Ian Studd	Men's 1 mile	4:09.5	4 Q	—N/a		3:58.4	3rd place, bronze medalist(s)
Ian Studd	Men's 3 miles	—N/a				13:25.8	10
Peter Welsh	Men's 3000 m steeplechase	—N/a				8:29.6 GR	1st place, gold medalist(s)

=== Field ===
Athlete	Event	Final	
Athlete	Event	Result	Rank
Diane Charteris	Women's discus throw	126 ft 2 in (38.46 m)	8
Diane Charteris	Women's shot put	46 ft 5 1/4 in (14.15 m)	5
Bob Hargreaves	Men's shot put	53 ft 11 in (16.43 m)	5
Les Mills	Men's discus throw	184 ft 4 in (56.18 m)	1st place, gold medalist(s)
Les Mills	Men's shot put	60 ft 3 1/4 in (18.37 m)	2nd place, silver medalist(s)
Dave Norris	Men's long jump	24 ft 6 1/4 in (7.47 m)	7
Dave Norris	Men's triple jump	50 ft 11 1/2 in (15.53 m)	5
Robin Tait	Men's discus throw	180 ft 6 in (55.02 m)	3rd place, bronze medalist(s)
Robin Tait	Men's shot put	53 ft 9 1/2 in (16.40 m)	6
Valerie Young	Women's discus throw	163 ft 4 in (49.78 m)	1st place, gold medalist(s)
Valerie Young	Women's shot put	54 ft 1 3/4 in (16.50 m) GR	1st place, gold medalist(s)

=== Combined ===
Athlete	Event	100 m	Long jump	Shot put	High jump	400 m	110 m hurdles	Discus throw	Pole vault	Javelin throw	1500 m	Overall points	Rank
Roy Williams	Men's decathlon	11.0; 804 pts	7.24 m 869 pts	13.60 m 703 pts	1.83 m 725 pts	51.2; 753 pts	15.0; 848 pts	45.24 m 786 pts	3.80 m 754 pts	47.30 m 596 pts	4:55.6; 432 pts	7270 pts GR	1st place, gold medalist(s)

== Badminton ==
Athlete	Event	Round of 32	Round of 16	Quarterfinal	Semifinal	Final / BM	Rank
Athlete	Event	Opposition Result	Opposition Result	Opposition Result	Opposition Result	Opposition Result	Rank
Alison Glenie	Women's singles	Bye	Espley (CAN); L 11–3 8–11 10–12	did not advance			
Don Higgins	Men's singles	Mills (ENG); L 15–9 7–15 1–15	did not advance				
Richard Purser	Men's singles	Goel (IND); L 15–5 13–18 14–17	did not advance				
Gaynor Simpson	Women's singles	Humber (CAN); L 3–11 11–7 9–11	did not advance				
Alison Glenie; Gaynor Simpson	Women's doubles	—N/a	Bye	Daysmith / Humber (CAN); W 17–16 15–10	Bairstow / Rogers (ENG); L 1–15 10–15	Teoh / Ang (MAL); L 11–15 9–15	4
Don Higgins; Richard Purser	Men's doubles	—N/a	Bye	Tan / Yew (MAL); L 7–15 7–15	did not advance		
Alison Glenie; Richard Purser	Mixed doubles	Bye	Ferguson / McCoig (SCO); L 4–15 15–11 8–15	did not advance			
Gaynor Simpson; Don Higgins	Mixed doubles	Bennett / Roberts (JAM); W 15–5 10–15 15–7	Whittaker / Paterson (CAN); L 10–15 7–15	did not advance			

== Boxing ==
Athlete	Event	Round of 16	Quarterfinal	Semifinal	Final	Rank
Athlete	Event	Opposition Result	Opposition Result	Opposition Result	Opposition Result	Rank
Wayne Young	Flyweight	—N/a	Scott (CAN); L	did not advance		
Brian Kendall	Bantamweight	Virabhak (SIN); W	Henry (JAM); W	Norwood (AUS); L	Did not advance	3rd place, bronze medalist(s)
Paul Domney	Lightweight	Porteous (SCO); L	did not advance			
Bill Kini	Heavyweight	—N/a	Coker (SLE); W WO	McAlinden (NIR); W	Ray (GHA); W	1st place, gold medalist(s)

== Cycling ==
=== Road ===
Men's road race

Athlete	Time	Rank
Laurie Byers	5:12:19.8	3rd place, bronze medalist(s)
Tino Tabak	5:40:00.6	15
Des Thomson	5:12:01.2	2nd place, silver medalist(s)
Richie Thomson	5:39:59.4	14

=== Track ===
Men's 1000 m sprint

Athlete	Round 1	Repechage	Round 2	Quarterfinals	Semifinals	Final / BM	
Athlete	Opposition Result	Opposition Result	Opposition Result	Opposition Result	Opposition Result	Opposition Result	Rank
John Bigwood	Cloutier (CAN); W 12.9	Bye	Barnett (ENG); L	did not progress			
Les Booth	Browne (BAR); Lawson (JAM); W 12.6	Bye	Hoyte (TTO); L	did not progress			

Men's 1 km time trial

Athlete	Time	Rank
Dave Comparini	1:15.21	9
Graham Wright	1:11.50	5

Men's 4000 m individual pursuit

Athlete	Qualification		Quarterfinals	Semifinals	Final / BM	Rank
Athlete	Time	Rank	Opponent Result	Opponent Result	Opponent Result	Rank
Dave Comparini	5:11.7	6 Q	Jackson (ENG); L 5:22.8	did not advance		
Graham Wright	5:15.1	7 Q	Bylsma (AUS); L 5:21.3	did not advance		

Men's 10 miles scratch race

Athlete	Time	Rank
John Bigwood	DNF	
Les Booth	Finished	Unplaced
Graham Wright	DNF	

== Diving ==
Athlete	Event	Preliminary		Final	
Athlete	Event	Points	Rank	Points	Rank
Robin Hood	Men's 3 m springboard	271.90	6 Q	130.46	5

== Fencing ==
=== Men ===
==== Individual ====
Athlete	Event	Elimination pool			Semifinal pool			Final pool		
Athlete	Event	Wins	Defeats	Rank	Wins	Defeats	Rank	Wins	Defeats	Rank
Bob Binning	Individual épée	1	4	6	did not advance					
Bob Binning	Individual sabre	4	2	3 Q	2	3	3 Q	3	4	6
Michael Henderson	Individual foil	3	2	3 Q	3	2	3 Q	3	4	6
Michael Henderson	Individual sabre	2	4	6	did not advance					
Keith Mann	Individual épée	2	4	5	did not advance					
Keith Mann	Individual foil	1	5	–	did not advance					
Richard Peterson	Individual épée	2	4	=5	did not advance					
Brian Pickworth	Individual foil	3	2	3 Q	3	2	3 Q	4	3	5
Brian Pickworth	Individual sabre	3	2	3 Q	3	1	3 Q	3	4	5

==== Team ====
Athletes	Event	Elimination pool		Semifinal	Final / BM	Rank
Athletes	Event	Opposition Result	Opposition Result	Opposition Result	Opposition Result	Rank
Bob Binning; Keith Mann; Richard Peterson	Team épée	Scotland; L 4–5	England; L 2–5	did not advance		
Michael Henderson; Keith Mann; Brian Pickworth	Team foil	Canada; W 6–3	Jamaica; W 6–3	Australia; L 3–5	Scotland; L 1–5	4
Bob Binning; Michael Henderson; Brian Pickworth	Team sabre	Wales; W 6–3	Jamaica; W 5–1	Australia; L 3–5	Canada; L 3–5	4

=== Women ===
==== Individual ====
Athlete	Event	Elimination pool			Final pool		
Athlete	Event	Wins	Defeats	Rank	Wins	Defeats	Rank
Joyce Fenton	Individual foil	2	4	5	did not advance		
Pam French	Individual foil	2	4	6	did not advance		
Gaye McDermit	Individual foil	4	3	3 Q	4	3	3rd place, bronze medalist(s)

==== Team ====
Athletes	Event	Pool		Final / BM	Rank
Athletes	Event	Opposition Result	Opposition Result	Opposition Result	Rank
Joyce Fenton; Pam French; Gaye McDermit	Team foil	England; L 3–6	Australia; L 3–6	Wales; W 5–2	3rd place, bronze medalist(s)

== Shooting ==
Open small bore rifle

Athlete	Points	Rank
Don Wild	582	6
Brian Lacey	585	2nd place, silver medalist(s)

Open full bore rifle

Athlete	Qualifying				Final		
Athlete	Stage 1	Stage 2	Total points	Rank	Stage 3	Total points	Rank
Maurie Gordon	100	143	243	=5 Q	135	378	5
Tom Sutherland	100	144	244	=3 Q	137	381	3rd place, bronze medalist(s)

== Swimming ==
Athlete	Event	Heat		Final	
Athlete	Event	Result	Rank	Result	Rank
Hilton Brown	Men's 110 yd backstroke	1:05.8	=9	did not progress	
Hilton Brown	Men's 220 yd backstroke	2:21.1	6 Q	2:19.8	5
Dave Gerrard	Men's 110 yd butterfly	1:01.8	4 Q	1:02.1	6
Dave Gerrard	Men's 220 yd butterfly	2:15.3	3 Q	2:12.7	1st place, gold medalist(s)
Tony Graham	Men's 110 yd breaststroke	1:13.8	2 Q	1:12.9	2nd place, silver medalist(s)
Tony Graham	Men's 220 yd breaststroke	2:39.4	2 Q	2:36.9	2nd place, silver medalist(s)
Vivien Haddon	Women's 110 yd breaststroke	1:19.7 GR	1 Q	1:21.9	4
Vivien Haddon	Women's 220 yd breaststroke		Q	2:53.9	3rd place, bronze medalist(s)
Heather Kerr	Women's 110 yd butterfly	1:13.0	10	did not progress	
Heather Kerr	Women's 220 yd butterfly	2:39.3	4 Q	2:36.4	4
Margaret Macrae	Women's 110 yd backstroke	1:13.9	7 Q	1:13.8	7
Margaret Macrae	Women's 220 yd backstroke	2:37.7	4 Q	2:34.7	3rd place, bronze medalist(s)
Margaret Macrae	Women's 440 yd freestyle	5:04.4	9	did not progress	
Margaret Macrae	Women's 4 × 110 yd individual medley	5:44.2	8 Q	DNS	
Paddy O'Carroll	Men's 110 yd backstroke	1:04.9	5 Q	1:04.4	4
Paddy O'Carroll	Men's 220 yd backstroke	2:21.9	7 Q	2:20.9	6
Paddy O'Carroll	Men's 110 yd freestyle	58.4	14	did not progress	
Allan Seagar	Men's 220 yd backstroke	2:22.2	8 Q	2:25.1	8
Allan Seagar	Men's 110 yd breaststroke	1:14.5	4 Q	1:13.9	4
Allan Seagar	Men's 220 yd breaststroke	2:40.8	4 Q	2:41.6	4
Allan Seagar	Men's 4 × 110 yd individual medley	5:03.6	4 Q	5:07.0	4
Tui Shipston	Women's 110 yd backstroke	1:17.4	11	did not progress	
Tui Shipston	Women's 220 yd backstroke	2:46.2	10	did not progress	
Tui Shipston	Women's 4 × 110 yd individual medley	5:48.8	9 (Note: Progressed to the final after the withdrawal of Margaret Macrae)	5:49.3	8
Hilton Brown; Tony Graham; Dave Gerrard; Paddy O'Carroll	Men's 4 × 110 yd medley relay	—N/a		4:17.5	3rd place, bronze medalist(s)
Margaret Macrae; Vivien Haddon; Heather Kerr; Tui Shipston	Women's 4 × 110 yd medley relay	—N/a		4:57.7	5

== Weightlifting ==
Athlete	Event	Press	Snatch	Jerk	Total	Rank
Bruce Cameron	Featherweight	181 lb (82.1 kg)	199 lb (90.3 kg)	260 lb (117.9 kg)	640 lb (290.3 kg)	8
John Bolton	Middleweight	242 1/2 lb (110.0 kg)	236 3/4 lb (107.4 kg)	308 1/2 lb (139.9 kg)	787 3/4 lb (357.3 kg)	6
Don Oliver	Heavyweight	352 1/2 lb (159.9 kg)	303 lb (137.4 kg)	440 3/4 lb (199.9 kg)	1,096 1/4 lb (497.3 kg) GR	1st place, gold medalist(s)

== Wrestling ==
Athlete	Event	Elimination rounds				Rank
Athlete	Event	Opposition Result	Opposition Result	Opposition Result	Opposition Result	Rank
Neil Scott	Featherweight	Aspen (ENG); L	Reid (CAN); L	Eliminated		=5
Tony Greig	Lightweight	Gilligan (ENG); W	Bye	Singh (IND); L	Lougheed (CAN); D	3rd place, bronze medalist(s)

== Officials ==
Team officials included:

- Manager – Ron Shakespeare
- Assistant manager – Ashley Taylor
- Chaperone – Pat Cheesman
- Medical officer – Mayne Smeeton
- Athletics
  - Section manager – J. Hutchinson
  - Coach – Frank Sharpley
- Badminton section manager – Valentine Arthur Horne
- Boxing section manager – Dick Dunn
- Cycling
  - Section manager – Merv Gamble
  - Coach – John Peoples
- Fencing section manager – Brian Hampton
- Shooting section manager – J. M. Ross
- Swimming and diving
  - Section manager – A. J. Donaldson
  - Coach – Morry Doidge
- Weightlifting section manager – Tony George
- Wrestling section manager – Barrie Courtney

== See also ==
- New Zealand Olympic Committee
- New Zealand at the Commonwealth Games
- New Zealand at the 1964 Summer Olympics
- New Zealand at the 1968 Summer Olympics
