= Fencing at the 1962 British Empire and Commonwealth Games =

- Venue: Army Drill Hall
- Location: Victoria Park, Perth, Australia
- Dates: 22 November to 1 December 1962

Fencing at the 1962 British Empire and Commonwealth Games was the fourth appearance of Fencing at the Commonwealth Games. The events took place at the Army Drill Hall at 32 State Street in Victoria Park, Perth, Australia, which doubled as the Post Office Branch No.3.

England topped the fencing medal table with four gold medals from the seven events.

== Medal table ==
* Host nation (Australia)

Medals won by nation with totals, ranked by number of golds—sortable
Rank	Nation	Gold	Silver	Bronze	Total
1	England	4	2	2	8
2	Australia	1	3	1	5
3	New Zealand	1	0	1	2
4	Scotland	1	0	0	1
5	Canada	0	2	3	5
Totals (5 entries)		7	7	7	21

== Medal winners ==
Event	Gold	Silver	Bronze
Foil (m)	Sandy Leckie (SCO)	Allan Jay (ENG)	Ralph Cooperman (ENG)
Foil team (m)	England; Allan Jay; Ralph Cooperman; René Paul	Australia; Brian McCowage; David McKenzie; Ivan Lund	Canada; Benedek Simo; Carl Schwende; John Andru
Épée (m)	Ivan Lund (AUS)	John Pelling (ENG)	Peter Jacobs (ENG)
Épée team (m)	England; John Pelling; Mike Howard; Peter Jacobs	Australia; Ivan Lund; John Humphreys; Mike Diamond	Canada; Carl Schwende; Peter Bakonyi; Robert Foxcroft
Sabre (m)	Ralph Cooperman (ENG)	Benedek Simo (CAN)	John Andru (CAN)
Sabre team (m)	England; Ralph Cooperman; George Birks; Michael Amberg	Canada; Benedek Simo; Carl Schwende; John Andru; Robert Foxcroft	New Zealand; Brian Pickworth; Michael Henderson; Bob Binning
Foil (w)	Dot Coleman (NZL)	Johanna Winter (AUS)	Janet Hopner (AUS)

== Results ==
=== Foil (men) ===
- Final pool

Pos	Athlete	Wins/hits against
1	(Scotland) Sandy Leckie	7 wins
2	(England) Allan Jay	6
3	(England) Ralph Cooperman	5
4	(England) René Paul	5
5	(New Zealand) Brian Pickworth	4
6	(Australia) Brian McCowage	3
7	(Canada) Benedek Simo	2
8	(Australia) Ivan Lund	2
9	(Canada) John Andru	0

=== Foil (women) ===
- Final pool

Pos	Athlete	Wins/hits against
1	(New Zealand) Dot Coleman	6 wins
2	(Australia) Johanna Winter	5 (14)
3	(Australia) Janet Hopner	5 (16)
4	(New Zealand) Rosemary Tomich	4 (17)
5	(England) Gillian Sheen	4 (18)
6	(England) Theresa Offredy	2
7	(Wales) Vivienne Ellis	1 (24)
8	(Wales) Jackie Reynolds	1 (26)

=== Épée (men) ===
- Final pool

Pos	Athlete	Wins, hits against
1	(Australia) Ivan Lund	7 wins
2	(England) John Pelling	5 (25)
3	(England) Peter Jacobs	5 (31)
4	(Australia) Michael Steven Diamond	4 (30)
5	(Wales) Robert Reynolds	4 (35)
6	(Australia) John Humphreys	3 (31)
7	(New Zealand) Keith Mann	3 (36)
8	(Scotland) John King	2 (36)
9	(Canada) Carl Schwende	2 (38)

=== Sabre (men) ===
- Final pool

Pos	Athlete	Wins
1	(England) Ralph Cooperman	7 wins
2	(Canada) Benedek Simo	5 (26)
3	(Canada) John Andru	5 (29)
4	(England) Mike Amberg	5 (30)
5	(New Zealand) Brian Pickworth	4 (21)
5	(New Zealand) Bob Binning	4 (21)
7	(England) George Birks	2 (35)
8	(Australia) Les Tornallyay	2 (36)
8	(Wales) John McCombe	2 (36)

=== Foil (team) ===
Round robin

Team 1	Team 2	Score
England	New Zealand	6–3
Australia	Canada	5–4
England	Wales	8–1
Australia	New Zealand	6–3
England	Canada	6–3
Wales	New Zealand	6–3
Canada	New Zealand	6–2
Australia	Wales	5–4
Canada	Wales	5–4
England	Australia	5–3

=== Épée (team) ===
Round robin

Team 1	Team 2	Score
Canada	New Zealand	7–2
Australia	Wales	5–4
Wales	New Zealand	5–4
England	Australia	6–3
Australia	Canada	6–2
England	Wales	6–2
Canada	Wales	6–3
England	New Zealand	9–0
England	Canada	5–3
Australia	New Zealand	5–4

=== Sabre (team) ===
Round robin

Team 1	Team 2	Score
New Zealand	Australia	6–3
Canada	Wales	7–2
England	New Zealand	7–2
Australia	Canada	5–4
Australia	Wales	5–4
England	Canada	5–4
England	Wales	7–2
Canada	New Zealand	5–4
England	Australia	8–1
New Zealand	Wales	7–2

== See also ==
- List of Commonwealth Games medallists in fencing
