= New Zealand at the 1964 Summer Olympics =

- IOC code: NZL
- NOC: New Zealand Olympic and British Empire Games Association
- Website: www.olympic.org.nz

in Tokyo
- Competitors: 64 (56 men, 8 women) in 11 sports
- Flag bearer: Peter Snell
- Officials: 17
- Medals Ranked 12th: Gold 3 Silver 0 Bronze 2 Total 5

Summer Olympics appearances (overview)
- 1908; 1912; 1920; 1924; 1928; 1932; 1936; 1948; 1952; 1956; 1960; 1964; 1968; 1972; 1976; 1980; 1984; 1988; 1992; 1996; 2000; 2004; 2008; 2012; 2016; 2020; 2024

Other related appearances
- Australasia (1908–1912)

New Zealand at the 1964 Summer Olympics was represented by a team of 64 competitors, 56 men and eight women, who took part in 35 events across 11 sports. Selection of the team for the Games in Tokyo, Japan, was the responsibility of the New Zealand Olympic and British Empire Games Association. New Zealand's flagbearer at the opening ceremony was Peter Snell. The New Zealand team finished equal 12th on the medal table, winning a total of five medals, three of which were gold.

== Medal tables ==
Medal	Name	Sport	Event	Date
Gold	Peter Snell	Athletics	Men's 800 metres	16 October
Gold	Peter Snell	Athletics	Men's 1500 metres	21 October
Gold	Helmer Pedersen; Earle Wells	Sailing	Flying Dutchman	21 October
Bronze	Marise Chamberlain	Athletics	Women's 800 metres	20 October
Bronze	John Davies	Athletics	Men's 1500 metres	21 October

Medals by sport
Sport	Gold medal	Silver medal	Bronze medal	Total
Athletics	2	0	2	4
Sailing	1	0	0	1
Total	3	0	2	5

Medals by gender
Gender	Gold medal	Silver medal	Bronze medal	Total
Male	3	0	1	4
Female	0	0	1	1
Total	3	0	2	5

== Athletics ==
=== Track and road ===
Athlete	Event	Heat		Quarterfinal		Semifinal		Final	
Athlete	Event	Result	Rank (Note: Ranks given are within the heat)	Result	Rank (Note: Ranks given are within the quarterfinal)	Result	Rank (Note: Ranks given are within the semifinal)	Result	Rank
Bill Baillie	Men's 5000 m	13:55.4	2 Q	—N/a				13:51.0	6
Marise Chamberlain	Women's 800 m	2:06.8	2 Q	—N/a		2:04.6	1 Q	2:02.8	3rd place, bronze medalist(s)
John Davies	Men's 1500 m	3:45.5	2 Q	—N/a		3:41.9	3 Q	3:39.6	3rd place, bronze medalist(s)
Murray Halberg	Men's 5000 m	14:12.0	4	—N/a				did not advance	
Murray Halberg	Men's 10,000 m	—N/a						29:10.8	7
Jeff Julian	Men's marathon	—N/a						2:27:57.6	29
Ivan Keats	Men's marathon	—N/a						2:36:16.8	42
Barry Magee	Men's 10,000 m	—N/a						30:32.0	23
Avis McIntosh	Women's 80 m hurdles	10.8	3 Q	—N/a		10.9	5	did not advance	
Avis McIntosh	Women's 100 m	12.0	4 Q	12.0	6	did not advance			
Doreen Porter	Women's 100 m	11.7	2 Q	11.8	5	did not advance			
Doreen Porter	Women's 200 m	24.2	3 q	—N/a		24.0	6	did not advance	
Ray Puckett	Men's marathon	—N/a						2:27:34.0	27
Neville Scott	Men's 5000 m	15:01.0	11	—N/a				did not advance	
Peter Snell	Men's 800 m	1:49.0	1 Q	—N/a		1:46.9	1 Q	1:45.1 OR	1st place, gold medalist(s)
Peter Snell	Men's 1500 m	3:46.8	4 Q	—N/a		3:38.8	1 Q	3:38.1	1st place, gold medalist(s)

=== Field ===
Athlete	Event	Qualification		Final	
Athlete	Event	Result	Rank	Result	Rank
Les Mills	Men's discus throw	51.70	21	did not advance	
Les Mills	Men's shot put	18.05	=6 Q	18.52	7
Valerie Young	Women's discus throw	51.94	10 Q	49.59	13
Valerie Young	Women's shot put	16.40	2 Q	17.26	4

== Boxing ==
Athlete	Event	Round of 64	Round of 32	Round of 16	Quarterfinals	Semifinals	Final	Rank
Athlete	Event	Opposition Result	Opposition Result	Opposition Result	Opposition Result	Opposition Result	Opposition Result	Rank
Paddy Donovan	Men's lightweight	Bye	Pace (ARG); L RSC	Did not advance				=17
Brian Maunsell	Men's light welterweight	Bye	Frolov (URS); L RSC	Did not advance				=17

== Cycling ==
Five cyclists represented New Zealand in 1964.

=== Road ===
Athlete	Event	Time	Rank
Laurie Byers	Men's individual road race	4:39:51.74	10
Max Grace	Men's individual road race	4:39:51.83	66
Dick Johnstone	Men's individual road race	4:39:51.74	17
Des Thomson	Men's individual road race	4:39:51.81	61
Laurie Byers; Arthur Candy; Max Grace; Dick Johnstone	Men's team time trial	2:38:37.35	18

== Equestrian ==
=== Jumping ===
Athlete	Horse	Event	Round 1		Round 2		Overall	
Athlete	Horse	Event	Faults	Rank	Faults	Rank	Faults	Rank
Bruce Hansen	Tide	Individual	24.00	=27	32.00	37	56.00	=31
Graeme Hansen	Saba Sam	Individual	12.75	10	25.00	33	37.75	23
Adrian White	El Dorado	Individual	37.25	36	25.25	34	62.50	35
Bruce Hansen; Graeme Hansen; Adrian White	See above	Team	74.00	10	82.25	10	156.25	10

== Gymnastics ==
=== Women's individual ===
Apparatus qualifying and all-around

Athlete	Vault			Uneven bars			Balance beam			Floor			All-around total	All-around rank
Athlete	C	O	Rank	C	O	Rank	C	O	Rank	C	O	Rank	All-around total	All-around rank
Pauline Gardiner	8.933	8.833	68	8.133	8.266	74	8.733	8.066	76	8.633	8.733	79	68.330	76
Theodora Hill	8.600	8.933	72	8.400	7.833	77	8.800	8.700	70	8.766	8.933	68	68.965	75
Jean Spencer	8.600	8.500	76	7.933	8.400	75	8.666	7.300	79	8.366	8.600	81	66.365	78

None of the New Zealand gymnasts qualified for any of the apparatus finals.

== Field hockey ==
=== Men's tournament ===
Team roster

John Anslow; Ernie Barnes; Trevor Blake; Peter Byers; Phil Bygrave; Timothy Carter; John Cullen	Ross Gillespie; Bruce Judge; Grantley Judge; Ian Kerr; Brian Maunsell; Alan Patterson; Bill Schaefer

Group A

12 October 1964

New Zealand	2–0	Great Britain

13 October 1964

Kenya	3–2	New Zealand

15 October 1964

Japan	1–0	New Zealand

16 October 1964

Australia	2–1	New Zealand

18 October 1964

Pakistan	2–0	New Zealand

19 October 1964

Rhodesia	2–1	New Zealand

Team	Pld	W	D	L	GF	GA	Pts	Qualification
Pakistan	6	6	0	0	17	3	12	Advance to semi-finals
Australia	6	4	0	2	16	5	8	Advance to semi-finals
Kenya	6	3	1	2	7	9	7	5th–8th classification round
Japan	6	3	0	3	6	6	6	5th–8th classification round
Great Britain	6	2	0	4	5	12	4	
Rhodesia	6	1	1	4	4	16	3	
New Zealand	6	1	0	5	6	10	2	

== Rowing ==
In 1964, New Zealand entered boats in three of the seven events: men's single sculls, men's coxed four, and men's eight. The competition was for men only; women would first row at the 1976 Summer Olympics.

Athlete	Event	Heats		Repechage		Final	
Athlete	Event	Time	Rank	Time	Rank	Time	Rank
Murray Watkinson	Single sculls	7:49.01	2 R	7:45.28	1 FA	8:35.57	5
Darien Boswell; Alistair Dryden; Peter Masfen; Dudley Storey; Robert Page (cox)	Coxed four	6:50.81	3 R	7:09.26	2 FB	6:45.16	8
Mark Brownlee; Lex Clark; Peter Delaney; John Gibbons; George Paterson; Tony Popplewell; Raymond Skinner; Alan Webster; Doug Pulman (cox)	Eight	6:20.63	4 R	6:14.83	3 FB	6:07.59	11

== Sailing ==
Athlete	Event	Race							Net points	Final rank
Athlete	Event	1	2	3	4	5	6	7	Net points	Final rank
Peter Mander	Finn	716	1017	841	716	1620	774	~~341~~	5684	4
Helmer Pedersen (helm); Earle Wells	Flying Dutchman	219	~~101~~; ~~DNF~~	1423	946	1423	1423	821	6255	1st place, gold medalist(s)

== Swimming ==
Athlete	Event	Heat		Semifinal		Final	
Athlete	Event	Result	Rank	Result	Rank	Result	Rank
Dave Gerrard	Men's 200 m butterfly	2:16.3	14 Q	2:15.4	13	did not advance	
Vivien Haddon	Women's 200 m breaststroke	2:53.4	11	—N/a		did not advance	

== Weightlifting ==
Athlete	Event	Press		Snatch		Clean & jerk		Total	Rank
Athlete	Event	Result	Rank	Result	Rank	Result	Rank	Total	Rank
Don Oliver	Men's heavyweight	157.5	10	132.5	12	190.0	=4	480.0	9

== Wrestling ==
Athlete	Event	Round 1	Round 2	Round 3	Round 4	Round 5	Final	Rank
Athlete	Event	Opposition Result	Opposition Result	Opposition Result	Opposition Result	Opposition Result	Opposition Result	Rank
Tony Greig	Men's freestyle lightweight	Jeong (KOR); L	Rost (EUA); L Fall	Eliminated				
Roy Meehan	Men's freestyle featherweight	Tovar (MEX); L Fall	Seifpour (IRI); L Fall	Eliminated				

== Officials ==
- Team manager – William Stevenson
- Assistant team manager – Ron Shakespeare
- Team doctor – Renton Grigor
- Chaperone – Zelda Bridgens
- Athletics section manager – Max Carr
- Boxing section manager – Syd Ashton
- Cycling section manager – Bob Carruthers
- Equestrian section manager – Ben Rutherford
- Field hockey section manager – Bob Milne
- Gymnastics section manager – David McKenzie-Edwards
- Rowing
  - Section manager – Jack Stevenson
  - Coach (eight and four) – Eric Craies
- Sailing section manager – Don St Clair Brown
- Swimming section manager – Bryan Simpson
- Weightlifting section manager – Trevor Clark
