= Richard Peterson (fencer) =

New Zealand fencer

Personal information
- Born: Richard Dale Peterson; 14 January 1940 Wellington, New Zealand
- Died: 12 January 2018 (aged 77)
- Occupation: Lawyer
- Spouse: Hilary Taylor (died 2007)

Sport
- Country: New Zealand
- Sport: Fencing

Achievements and titles
- National finals: Épée champion (1965); Foil champion (1970, 1973, 1975); Sabre champion (1972, 1974, 1976, 1977, 1978, 1980, 1984, 1991)

Richard Dale Peterson (14 January 1940 – 12 January 2018) was a New Zealand fencer and lawyer. He represented his country at the 1966 and 1970 British Commonwealth Games, and won 12 New Zealand national fencing titles across three disciplines. A commercial lawyer in Wellington, Peterson and his wife Hilary established clubs to support sufferers of dementia.

== Early life and family ==
Born in Wellington on 14 January 1940, Peterson was the son of Basil and Ruth Peterson. His father worked for Wellington City Council and finished his career as the city's town clerk. Richard Peterson was educated at Khandallah School, Scots College, and then Nelson College as a boarder from 1953 to 1957. An accomplished musician, he was the school pianist at Nelson College. Peterson went on to study law at Victoria University of Wellington, completing a Bachelor of Laws degree in 1961 and a Master of Laws by examination in 1963.

Peterson first met his wife, Hilary Taylor, while travelling to Britain by ship in 1963. They eventually married and had three children.

== Fencing ==
Peterson joined the Victoria University Swords Club in 1958. Over a period of 26 years, he won 12 New Zealand national fencing titles. The first was in 1965, when he won the men's épée title, the only time he would win the national championship in that discipline. He won the national men's foil championship in 1970, 1973 and 1975, but it was in the sabre that he was most successful, winning the national title on eight occasions between 1972 and 1991. At the national championships in 1973, Peterson was awarded the title of Master of Arms.

Peterson represented New Zealand at the 1966 and 1970 British Commonwealth Games. At the 1966 games, he won two of his six contests in the elimination pool of the men's individual épée, and did not progress. In the men's team épée, he competed for New Zealand alongside Bob Binning and Keith Mann, losing against Scotland and England and not advancing beyond the elimination pool. At the 1970 games, Peterson competed in both the individual and team competitions for all three disciplines. In the individual foil he did not progress past the first-round pool, while in the individual épée and sabre competitions he was eliminated at the semifinal pool stage. In the team foil and sabre events, the New Zealanders failed to progress past the semifinal pool, but their best result came in the team épée where the team of Peterson, Michael Henderson, Brian Pickworth and Arthur Gatland finished in fourth place.

Peterson won two Oceanic zone sabre titles and was nominated by Fencing New Zealand for the 1976 New Zealand Summer Olympic team. However, he was not selected by the New Zealand Olympic and Commonwealth Games Association (NZOCGA). In 1979, Peterson captained the New Zealand team at the 1979 World Fencing Championships in Melbourne.

Peterson was active in fencing administration at all levels, and served as president of the New Zealand Amateur Fencing Association. Later he was awarded life membership of Fencing New Zealand and served as the organisation's patron. At the time of the 1980 Summer Olympics boycott, Peterson represented the sports of fencing and modern pentathlon on the NZOCGA, and the latter sport was one of only two that sent New Zealand athletes to the games, competing under the flag of the national Olympic committee.

== Legal career ==
Admitted as a solicitor in 1962, and as a barrister the next year, Peterson worked at Chapman Tripp as a solicitor and partner until joining Scott Morrison Hardie-Boys Morrison and Co. in 1977. In 1999, he and John Harkness established Harkness and Peterson Law, before joining with John Hoggard to form Peterson Law Limited in 2009. In 2014, that firm merged with Morrison Kent, and Peterson retired from legal practice the following year.

Initially Peterson worked in estate planning, before expanding into trust and taxation law, and finally commercial law.

== Charitable work ==
After Peterson's mother suffered from dementia, Hilary Peterson recognised a need for day centres to support dementia patients and their families, and the couple founded and supported the Marsden Club, the first of its kind in New Zealand, to assist people with dementia to remain living in their own homes. They also established the Chelsea Club with the same purpose. In the 2003 New Year Honours, Hilary Peterson was awarded the Queen's Service Medal for community service.

== Later life and death ==
Hilary Peterson died in 2007. In his later years, Richard Peterson was active in the Khandallah Lawn Bowling Club. He died on 12 January 2018.
