= Arthur Candy =

New Zealand cyclist (1934–2019)

Personal information
- Born: William Arthur Francis Candy; 19 June 1934 Palmerston North, New Zealand
- Died: 25 June 2019 (aged 85) Rotorua, New Zealand
- Height: 1.75 m (5 ft 9 in)
- Weight: 81 kg (179 lb)

Cycling career
- Sport: Cycling

William Arthur Francis Candy (19 June 1934 – 25 June 2019) was a New Zealand cyclist who represented his country at the 1962 British Empire and Commonwealth Games and 1964 Olympic Games.

At the 1962 British Empire and Commonwealth Games in Perth, Western Australia, Candy competed on the track in the 10-mile scratch race and 4000 m individual pursuit. He was unplaced in the scratch race, while in the individual pursuit he was eliminated in the quarter-finals, defeated by Charlie McCoy from England.

Candy competed on the road for New Zealand at the 1964 Olympics in Tokyo. Alongside Laurie Byers, Richard Johnstone and Max Grace, he rode in the team time trial, finishing in 18th place.

Candy died in Rotorua on 25 June 2019.
