= Daniel Quigley =

Daniel Quigley may refer to:

- Daniel Quigley (rowing), New Zealand coxswain
- Daniel Thomas Quigley, American physician, surgeon and writer
- Dan Quigley, Irish hurling coach and former player
