= Keith Mann (fencer) =

New Zealand fencer (1932–2021)

Keith Mann MNZM
Personal information
- Born: Keith Stuart Mann; 1 May 1932
- Died: 13 November 2021 (aged 89) Christchurch, New Zealand

Sport
- Country: New Zealand
- Sport: Fencing

Achievements and titles
- National finals: Épée champion (1960, 1961)

Keith Stuart Mann MNZM (1 May 1932 – 13 November 2021) was a New Zealand fencer and fencing administrator.

Mann was born on 1 May 1932. He won two New Zealand national titles in the men's épée, in 1960 and 1961. At the national championships in 1961, he was awarded the title of Master of Arms, and at the 1975 nationals he received the Domenico Angelo award.

Mann represented New Zealand at the 1962 and 1966 British Empire and Commonwealth Games. At the 1962 games, he finished seventh in the men's individual épée, and did not progress beyond the elimination pool in the men's individual foil event. In the men's team épée, he competed for New Zealand alongside Bob Binning and Brian Pickworth, while in the men's team foil his teammates were Pickworth and Michael Henderson; they finished fifth in both events. At the 1966 games, Mann again competed in the men's individual épée and foil, but did not progress beyond the elimination pool in either event. He finished fourth with Michael Henderson and Brian Pickworth in the men's team foil, while in the men's team épée he and teammates Bob Binning and Richard Peterson lost both of their ties in the elimination pool and did not advance further.

Mann later served as president of Fencing Mid-South, and Fencing New Zealand, and was patron of the United Fencing Club in Christchurch. He was also a New Zealand fencing selector for many years, and was a New Zealand team official at the 1970 British Commonwealth Games in Edinburgh. He also coached New Zealand fencing teams and was involved with other sports including boxing and parasports, and was a member of the group that investigated the possibility of a bid by Christchurch to host the 2006 Winter Olympics. In the 2007 New Year Honours, Mann was appointed a Member of the New Zealand Order of Merit, for services to sport, in particular fencing.

Mann died in Christchurch on 13 November 2021.
