= Vivienne Ellis =

Welsh fencer

Personal information
- Nationality: British (Welsh)

Sport
- Sport: Fencing
- Event: Foil
- Club: Salle Reynolds Fencing Club

Vivienne Ellis is a former fencer from Wales, who competed at the 1962 British Empire and Commonwealth Games (now Commonwealth Games).

== Biography ==
Ellis was a member of the Salle Reynolds Fencing Club and was a Welsh international.

Ellis represented the 1962 Welsh team at the 1962 British Empire and Commonwealth Games in Perth, Australia, where she participated in two individual foil event. Ellis finished 7th in the final pool, which included a win over her Welsh compatriot Jackie Reynolds.
