= Daniel Quigley (rowing) =

New Zealand rowing coxswain

Personal information
- Born: 16 May 1988 (age 38) Auckland
- Education: Saint Kentigern College
- Height: 167 cm (5 ft 6 in)
- Weight: 55 kg (121 lb)

Sport
- Sport: Rowing
Medal record
Men's rowing
Representing New Zealand
World U23 Rowing Championships
Gold medal – first place	2006 Hazewinkel, Belgium	Coxed four
World Championships
Bronze medal – third place	2006 Eton, UK	Coxed four

Daniel Quigley (born 16 May 1988) is a New Zealand coxswain.

In 2006 Quigley was selected as cox in the New Zealand four, along with James Dallinger, Steven Cottle, Paul Gerritsen, and Dane Boswell. They won gold at the FISA Under 23 World Championships also setting a new world-record time of 6.03 in Hazelwinkel, Belgium and bronze at the World Championships in Eton, UK.
