= Ernie Barnes (field hockey) =

New Zealand field hockey player

Personal information
- Born: Ernest Barnes; 20 April 1937 (age 88) Christchurch, New Zealand
- Education: Christchurch Boys' High School
- Occupations: Businessman; hockey coach
- Height: 1.75 m (5 ft 9 in)
- Weight: 75 kg (165 lb)
- Spouse: Virginia Nicholls (m. 1964; died 2022)
- Children: 2

Sport
- Country: New Zealand
- Sport: Field hockey
- Position: Midfielder

Ernest Barnes (born 20 April 1937) is a former New Zealand field hockey player and coach. He represented his country in the men's tournament at the 1964 Summer Olympics, and was later the New Zealand Hockey Association's national coach from 1971 to 1975.

== Early life and family ==
Barnes was born in Christchurch on 20 April 1937, the son of Margery Edith Barnes (née Riley) and Ernest Henry Gray Barnes. He was educated at Christchurch Boys' High School, where he was vice-captain of the school's 1st XI hockey and cricket teams in 1955.

In November 1964, Barnes married Virginia Lila Nicholls at St Mary's Anglican Church in the Christchurch suburb of Merivale, and the couple went on to have two children.

== Hockey career ==
=== Player ===
Barnes was a member of the High School Old Boys' hockey club in Christchurch, and played senior hockey for the club until at least 1977. A centre or left-half known for close control and tenacity, he represented Canterbury for 10 years from 1959, and played for the New Zealand national team from 1961 to 1964.

In 1960, Barnes was on the fringe of national selection, taking part in a 28-man training camp in Palmerston North ahead of the naming of the New Zealand team to compete at the 1960 Olympic Games; ultimately, however, he was not selected for those Games.

The following year, Barnes was a member of the New Zealand side that toured Australia, and made his international debut in the drawn second test against Australia at Perth, where he was reported to be "playing at his top form and fought many duels with the Australian vice-captain" Donald Currie. He then played in the first test against the touring Japanese national team at Christchurch, won 2–0 by the home side, two days after arriving back from the Australian tour. Barnes played at centre-half in that match, in which he was reportedly "frequently out of position, often passed without looking and was totally absent when his opponents raced through the middle in the second spell", and "his efforts to evade tacklers with stickwork were seldom successful". He was subsequently dropped to the reserves for the second test.

Barnes was part of the New Zealand team that took travelled to India and took part in an international hockey tournament at Ahmedabad early in 1962. In a hard-fought match against Australia at the tournament, Barnes closely marked the "dashing" Australian centre-forward Eric Pearce, keeping the scoreline to 1–0 in favour of Australia. Barnes scored a goal for New Zealand in their 6–0 victory over Indonesia later in the tournament.

In 1963, Barnes was named in the reserves for the first test against the touring Australian team, but returned to the starting line-up for the second test in Hamilton, won 4–2 by Australia.

Barnes was selected for to represent New Zealand at the 1964 Summer Olympics. He played in four of New Zealand's six matches at the Olympic tournament—where New Zealand failed to progress beyond the group stage—without scoring any goals. Following the Games, Barnes observed that play at the tournament was tough and unrelenting, with an emphasis on winning, and that the New Zealand hockey team would need to "toughen up" and "iron out imperfections" if they were to succeed at future Olympics.

=== Coach and administrator ===
Barnes coached hockey at Christchurch Boys' High School, and alongside former New Zealand international Alan Patterson was coach of the High School Old Boys' senior team until 1971. His coaching method was strongly influenced by Jack Reece, who coached the Canterbury representative team during Barnes' playing career.

In 1971, Barnes was appointed national hockey coach by the New Zealand Hockey Association. Speaking of Barnes' appointment, The Press newspaper commented that "if hockey playing experience is of any value, he would be as well qualified as any person in New Zealand". The role involved formulating and coordinating coaching programmes across the country, coaching of trainee teachers at teachers' training colleges, coaching primary and secondary school players, and instructing coaches, with the aim of increasing the depth of experience of players nationally. It was not intended that he would coach generally at a senior level in the larger regions, but he was available to provide advice if required, and he would coach at senior level in smaller regions. In the era before hockey in New Zealand was played on artificial surfaces, Barnes recognised the importance of teaching basic skills indoors, where skills could be honed without the distraction of the variability of playing on grass. Barnes resigned as the national hockey coach at the end of 1975, and was replaced by the former Australian international player, Des Wise.

Barnes also served on the New Zealand Hockey Association's management committee. He resigned from that role in December 1976, to concentrate on his business interests.

== Working life ==
Barnes owned and managed a poultry farm for six years, selling the business in 1971 shortly before taking up the position of national hockey coach. In about 1977, he went into business with Bruce Ullrich, forming Ullrich Barnes Group, which had interests in plastics manufacturing, the textile industry, and travel. The name of the company was changed to Merrimack Holdings Ltd in 1983.

== Later life ==
Barnes' wife, Virginia, died in Christchurch in 2022, after over 57 years of marriage.
