= Andrew Reynolds (fencer) =

Welsh fencer

Personal information
- Nationality: British (Welsh)
- Born: c.1943 East Glamorgan, Wales

Sport
- Sport: Fencing
- Event(s): Foil, Épée
- Club: Salle Reynolds Fencing Club

Andrew S. Reynolds (born 1943) is a former fencer from Wales, who competed at two Commonwealth Games.

== Biography ==
Reynolds was born to a fencing family, his father was the leading Welsh fencing coach Professor Glynne S. Reynolds and his mother Jackie Reynolds was a four-times Welsh foil champion. In February 1957, the family, which included three other siblings; Robert, Valerie and Frances, all emigrated to Southern Rhodesia. At the time Andrew was the Welsh national schoolboys runner-up.

The family returned to Wales and Andrew was a member of the Salle Reynolds Fencing Club. He represented the 1966 Welsh team in Kingston, Jamaica, where he participated in the foil and Épée events.

Reynolds attended his second Commonwealth Games at the 1970 British Commonwealth Games in Edinburgh. His siblings Robert and Frances also competed at the 1966 and 1970 Games.
