= Theodora Hill =

New Zealand Olympic gymnast

Theodora Götz ONZM
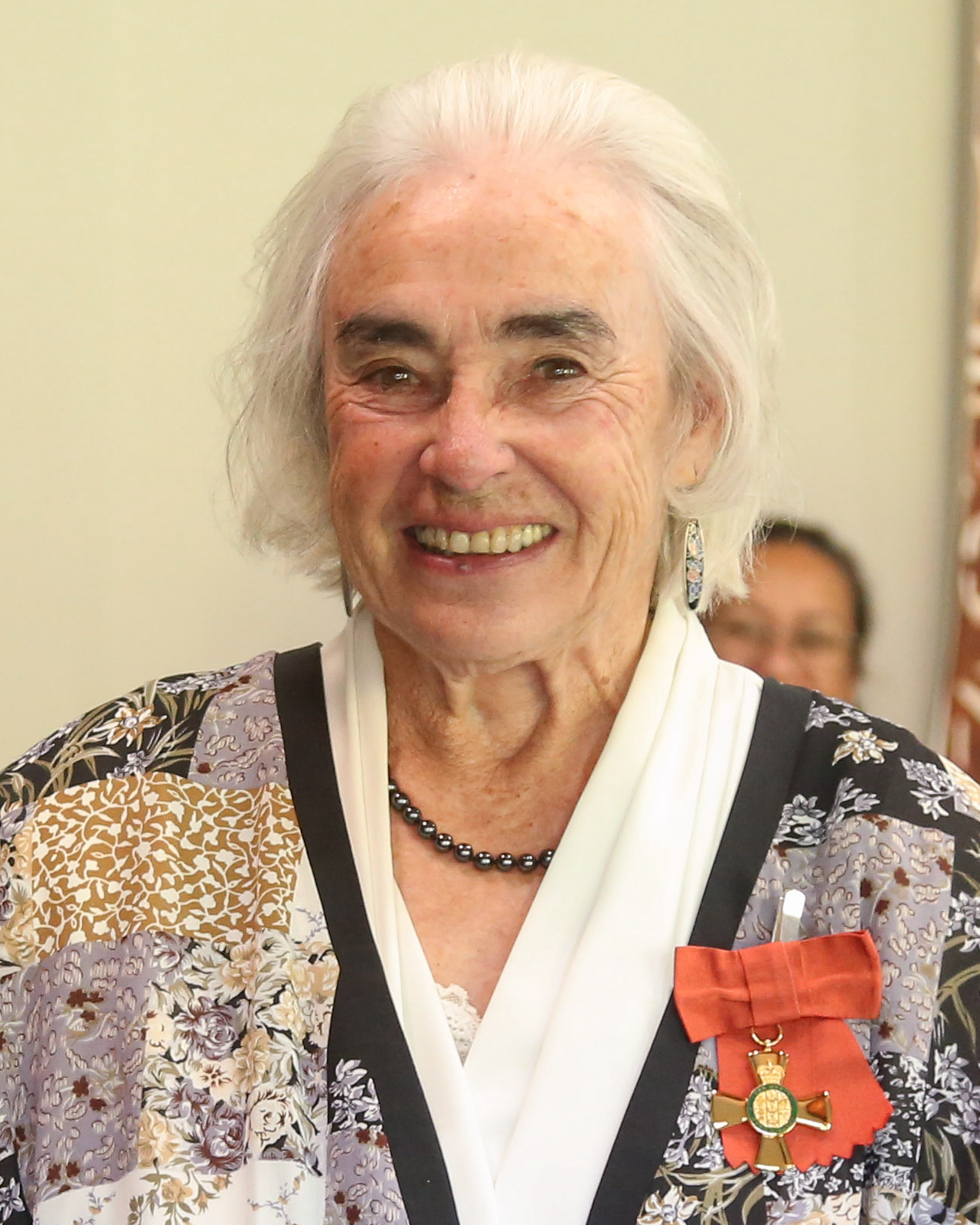
- Götz in 2024

Personal information
- Born: Theodora Mary Hill; 11 January 1946 (age 80) Hāwera, New Zealand
- Height: 163 cm (5 ft 4 in)
- Weight: 62 kg (137 lb)

Sport
- Country: New Zealand
- Sport: Artistic gymnastics

Theodora Mary "Dido" Götz ONZM (née Hill; born 11 January 1946) is a New Zealand gymnast, gymnastics coach and judge. She represented her country at the 1964 Summer Olympics and was coach of the New Zealand gymnastics team at the 1972 Olympic Games.

== Life ==
Götz was born Theodora Mary Hill in 1946 in Hāwera, New Zealand. She won her first women's national championship in 1963 and in total, she was national champion five times.

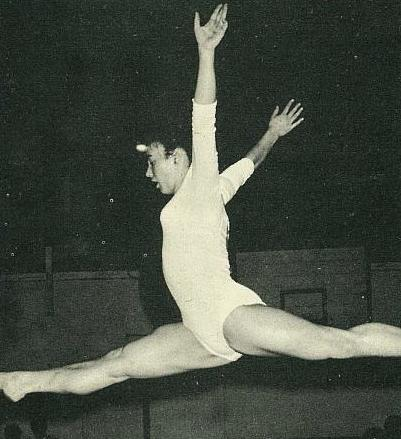
Hill in 1964

Hill represented her country at the 1964 Summer Olympics in Tokyo, Japan, in gymnastics. In the vault, she came 72nd. In the floor exercise, she was 68th. On the uneven bars, she came 77th. On the balance beam, she was 70th. In the Women's individual all-around, she was ranked 75th of 86 competitors. She is listed as New Zealand Olympic competitor number 180. She represented New Zealand at a number of World Gymnastics Championships.

Later in life, Götz worked as a coach and judged gymnastics competitions. She remains active in gymnastics herself and by 2013, she had competed in four World Masters Games. She was present in May 2016 when the New Zealand Olympic Committee announced the three gymnasts that were to represent the country at the 2016 Summer Olympics. Hill was a judge at the mid-island gymnastics champs in Gisborne in June 2017. In May 2017, she was made a life member of Gymnastics New Zealand.

Götz lives in Auckland. She is known in gymnastics circles as Dido.

In the 2024 New Year Honours, Götz was appointed an Officer of the New Zealand Order of Merit, for services to gymnastics.
