= John King (fencer) =

Scottish fencer

Personal information
- Nationality: British (Scotland)

Sport
- Sport: Fencing
- Event: Épée
- Club: Bon Accord FC

John A. King is a former fencer from Scotland, who represented Scotland at the British Empire and Commonwealth Games (now Commonwealth Games).

== Biography ==
King was a member of the Bon Accord Fencing Club.

In 1958 he represented the 1958 Scottish Team, at the 1958 British Empire and Commonwealth Games in Cardiff, Wales, where he participated in the individual épée.

Four years later he represented the 1962 Scottish Team at the 1962 British Empire and Commonwealth Games in Perth, Australia, participating in the épée, foil and sabre events.

King continued his form into 1963, winning all of his events for the Scottish Fencing Union against the Scottish Universities.
