= James Dallinger =

New Zealand rower

Personal information
- Born: James William Dallinger; 30 September 1985 (age 41) Hora Hora, Cambridge, New Zealand
- Height: 190 cm (6 ft 3 in)
- Weight: 97 kg (214 lb)

Sport
- Sport: Rowing
Medal record
Men's rowing
Representing New Zealand
World Rowing Championships
Gold medal – first place	2007 Munich	Coxless four
Bronze medal – third place	2006 Eton	Coxed four
World Rowing U23 Championships
Gold medal – first place	2006 Hazewinkel	Coxed four
World Rowing Cup
Silver medal – second place	2011, Hamburg	Coxless four
Bronze medal – third place	2007, Lucerne	Coxless four
Gold medal – first place	2007, Amsterdam	Coxless four
European Surf Rowing Championships
Gold medal – first place	2008, Biarritz	Surf Boat

James William Dallinger (born 30 September 1985) is a New Zealand rower. He was a member of the World Champion under-23 coxed four in 2006, and the world champion senior coxless four in 2007. He has been selected for the New Zealand coxless four to compete at the Beijing Olympics.

== Early life ==
Dallinger was born in Hora Hora, Cambridge, New Zealand and attended St Paul's Collegiate School in nearby Hamilton. He started rowing with the school club in 2000, where he was coached by three-time Olympian Ian Wright (rower).

In 2002 and 2003 Dallinger was part of the U19 Eight that won the Maadi Cup – the first two wins in the school's history.

== International rowing ==
In 2006 Dallinger was selected as bowman in the New Zealand coxed four, along with Steven Cottle, Paul Gerritsen, Dane Boswell and cox Daniel Quigley. They won gold at the FISA Under 23 World Championships also setting a new world-record time of 6.03 in Hazelwinkel, Belgium and Bronze at the World Championships in Eton, UK.

In 2007 he made the NZ coxless four in the number two position with fellow crew members Hamish Bond, Eric Murray and Carl Meyer under coach Chris Nillsen. The team won Gold at the 2007 World Championships in Munich, Germany thus qualifying them for the 2008 Beijing Olympic Games.

In 2008 competing in the international regattas didn't go so well for Dallinger and his crew, getting 6th in Lucerne, Switzerland and 5th Poznan, Poland, and a gutting 7th in the Olympics after running through the heats being one of the 8 crew with less than 0.7 sec parting them.

After the Games, Dallinger joined the Piha Surf Boat Rowing team bound for Biarritz, France to compete in the 2008 European Ocean Thunder series, with teammates Mark Bournville, Matt Kirk, Craig Knox, Brad Myton, Bruce O'Brien and Hayden Smith. Dallinger and the Piha boys took Gold in the final, giving them the title of the European Champions.

In December 2010 Dallinger after coaching at the Waikato Regional Rowing Performance Centre for a few months decided to get back in the boat, training paid off and after the National Rowing trials was selected again as part of the Men's Coxless Four along with 2007/08 teammate Carl Meyer and two new boys Benjamin Hammond and Chris Harris the pair both from Whanganui. Already they have had some success in the campaign to the World Championships later on this year in Bled, Slovenia securing a 2nd at the World Rowing Cup in Hamburg, Germany.
