= Frances Reynolds (fencer) =

Welsh fencer

Personal information
- Nationality: British (Welsh)
- Born: 1946 East Glamorgan, Wales

Sport
- Sport: Fencing
- Event: Foil
- Club: Salle Reynolds Fencing Club

Frances R. Reynolds married name Williams (born 1946) is a former fencer from Wales, who competed at two Commonwealth Games.

== Biography ==
Reynolds was born to a fencing family, her father was the leading Welsh fencing coach Professor Glynne S. Reynolds and her mother Jackie Reynolds was a four-times Welsh foil champion. In February 1957, the family, which included three other siblings; Robert, Andrew and twin Valerie, all emigrated to Southern Rhodesia. At the time Frances was ten-years-old.

The family returned to Wales and Frances was a member of the Salle Reynolds Fencing Club. She represented the 1966 Welsh team in Kingston, Jamaica, where he participated in the individual foil event.

Reynolds attended her second Commonwealth Games at the 1970 British Commonwealth Games in Edinburgh. Her siblings Robert and Andrew also competed at the 1966 and 1970 Games.

In 1994 she was working for Cardiff City's housing department.
