= Steven Cottle =

New Zealand rower

Personal information
- Born: 24 August 1984 (age 42)

Sport
- Sport: Rowing
Medal record
Men's rowing
Representing New Zealand
World Under-23 Rowing Championships
| Gold medal – first place | 2006 Hazewinkel, Belgium | Coxed four |
World Championships
| Bronze medal – third place | 2006 Eton, UK | Coxed four |

Steven Cottle (born 24 August 1984) is a New Zealand rower.

In 2006 Cottle was selected as the number two oarsman in the New Zealand coxed four, alongside James Dallinger, Paul Gerritsen, Dane Boswell and cox Daniel Quigley. They won gold at the FISA Under 23 World Championships also setting a new world-record time of 6.03 in Hazewinkel, Belgium and bronze at the World Championships in Eton, UK.
