= Dane Boswell =

New Zealand rower

Personal information
- Born: 7 May 1984 (age 42)
- Height: 198 cm (6 ft 6 in)
- Weight: 96 kg (212 lb)
- Relative: Darien Boswell (father)

Sport
- Country: New Zealand
- Sport: Rowing
Medal record
Men's rowing
Representing New Zealand
World Under-23 Rowing Championships
Gold medal – first place	2006 Hazewinkel	Coxed four
World Championships
Bronze medal – third place	2006 Eton	Coxed four

Dane Boswell (born 7 May 1984) is a New Zealand rower.

Boswell was born in 1984 and grew up in Kerikeri. His father is Darien Boswell, who represented New Zealand in rowing at the 1962 British Empire and Commonwealth Games. In 2005, he was the recipient of the Prime Minister's Athlete Scholarship, which enabled him to attend the University of Waikato.

In 2006 Boswell was selected as stroke in the New Zealand coxed four, along with James Dallinger, Paul Gerritsen, Steven Cottle, and cox Daniel Quigley. They won gold at that year's World Rowing U23 Championships in Hazewinkel, Belgium, also setting a new world record time of 6.03 minutes. The same team won bronze at the 2006 World Championships in Eton, UK. During 2007, Boswell was a member of the New Zealand eight that competed at the World Rowing Cups in Amsterdam and Lucerne, but was not in the boat that went to that year's World Rowing Championships in Munich.

In 2009, Boswell received a two-month ban from the Sports Tribunal of New Zealand for having tested positive for Probenecid, a masking agent. It was accepted that it was an inadvertent mistake, but he was found guilty of not having followed the necessary procedure of advising his doctor that he is an athlete when the drug was prescribed for an injury.
