= New Zealand at the Commonwealth Games =

- CG code: NZL
- CGA: New Zealand Olympic Committee
- Website: www.olympic.org.nz
- Medals Ranked 5th: Gold 179 Silver 232 Bronze 294 Total 705

Commonwealth Games appearances (overview)
- 1930; 1934; 1938; 1950; 1954; 1958; 1962; 1966; 1970; 1974; 1978; 1982; 1986; 1990; 1994; 1998; 2002; 2006; 2010; 2014; 2018; 2022; 2026; 2030

New Zealand has competed in all of the Commonwealth Games since the first in 1930, and has won a total of 656 medals including 159 gold.

The New Zealand Olympic Committee (known as The New Zealand Olympic and Commonwealth Games Association prior to 1994) is the body in New Zealand responsible for selecting Athletes to represent New Zealand at the Commonwealth Games. The NZOC is a member of the Commonwealth Games Federation.

== Host nation ==
New Zealand has hosted the Games three times:

- 1950 British Empire Games – Auckland
- 1974 British Commonwealth Games – Christchurch
- 1990 Commonwealth Games – Auckland

== Medals ==
Historically, New Zealand has generally been 4th or 5th, though was up to 3rd (1950 & 1962), and down to 11th (1970 & 2010) and 9th (2006). At the first games in 1930, New Zealand's 4th position was ahead of Australia at 5th. In the all-time medal tally New Zealand is ranked 5th behind Australia, England, Canada and India.

Host country (New Zealand)

Games	Gold	Silver	Bronze	Total
(Canada) 1930 Hamilton	3	4	2	9
(England) 1934 London	1	0	2	3
(Australia) 1938 Sydney	5	7	13	25
(New Zealand) 1950 Auckland*	10	22	21	53
(Canada) 1954 Vancouver	7	7	5	19
(Wales) 1958 Cardiff	4	6	9	19
(Australia) 1962 Perth	10	12	10	32
(Jamaica) 1966 Kingston	8	5	13	26
(Scotland) 1970 Edinburgh	2	6	6	14
(New Zealand) 1974 Christchurch*	9	8	18	35
(Canada) 1978 Edmonton	5	6	9	20
(Australia) 1982 Brisbane	5	8	13	26
(Scotland) 1986 Edinburgh	8	16	14	38
(New Zealand) 1990 Auckland*	17	14	27	58
(Canada) 1994 Victoria	5	16	20	41
(Malaysia) 1998 Kuala Lumpur	8	6	20	34
(England) 2002 Manchester	11	13	21	45
(Australia) 2006 Melbourne	6	12	13	31
(India) 2010 Delhi	6	22	8	36
(Scotland) 2014 Glasgow	14	14	17	45
(Australia) 2018 Gold Coast	15	16	15	46
(England) 2022 Birmingham	20	12	18	50
Totals (22 entries)	**179**	**232**	**294**	**705**

=== By sport ===
Events in bold featured at the 2018 Commonwealth Games.

Sport	Gold	Silver	Bronze	Total
Athletics	39	50	53	142
Cycling	35	52	44	131
Swimming	24	32	38	94
Lawn bowls	16	12	18	46
Shooting	15	16	20	51
Weightlifting	12	13	16	41
Rowing	9	15	7	31
Squash	8	4	4	16
Boxing	7	6	25	38
Rugby sevens	6	1	2	9
Wrestling	3	9	18	30
Netball	2	3	1	6
Gymnastics	2	0	9	11
Judo	1	5	8	14
Hockey	1	3	3	7
Fencing	1	2	3	6
Table tennis	1	1	2	4
Archery	1	0	0	1
Triathlon	0	3	3	6
Badminton	0	2	9	11
Basketball	0	2	2	4
Water polo	0	1	0	1
Diving	0	0	4	4
Cricket	0	0	2	2
Synchronised swimming	0	0	2	2
Beach volleyball	0	0	1	1
Totals (26 entries)	**183**	**232**	**294**	**709**

== Competitors ==
Greg Yelavich has won the most medals, with 12 medals in sports shooting at 6 Games from 1986 to 2010. Rowan Brassey also competed at 6 games, winning 3 medals in lawn bowls. Gary Anderson won 3 golds, 2 silvers and 3 bronze medals for New Zealand in cycling.

Valerie Young has won the most gold medals, winning 5 in athletics.
