= Peter Watkinson =

New Zealand rower

Medal record

Men's rowing

Representing New Zealand

British Empire and Commonwealth Games
Silver medal – second place	1962 Perth	Double sculls

Peter Watkinson is a former New Zealand rower.

At the 1962 British Empire and Commonwealth Games he won a silver medal in the double sculls, partnering his brother Murray. He worked as commercial traveller.
