= Colin Cordes =

New Zealand rower

Sport
- Sport: Rowing
Medal record
Men's rowing
Representing New Zealand
British Empire and Commonwealth Games
Silver medal – second place	1962 Perth	Eight

Colin Cordes is a former New Zealand rower.

At the 1962 British Empire and Commonwealth Games he won the silver medal as part of the men's eight alongside crew members Leslie Arthur, Darien Boswell, Alistair Dryden, Alan Grey, Christian Larsen, Louis Lobel, Robert Page and Alan Webster.
