= Des Thomson =

New Zealand cyclist (born 1942)

Personal information
- Born: 22 August 1942 (age 84) Oamaru, New Zealand

Cycling career
- Sport: Cycling
Medal record
Men's cycling
Representing New Zealand
British Empire and Commonwealth Games
Silver medal – second place	1966 Kingston	Road Race

Desmond "Des" Ronald Thomson (born 22 August 1942) is a former racing cyclist from New Zealand.

He won the silver medal in the men's road race at the 1966 British Empire and Commonwealth Games.

He went to two Olympics in 1964 and 1968 competing in the men's road race and team time trial. In the men's road race, he finished 61st in 1964 and 52nd in 1968.

His brother Richie Thomson was also a New Zealand representative cyclist competing at two Commonwealth Games and the 1968 Olympic Games.

Des Thomson also won the Australian Road title. He rode for Queensland having moved to the Gold Coast and joining Nerang – Gold Coast cycling club.
