= Peter Masfen =

New Zealand businessman (born 1941)

Peter Masfen CNZM
Personal information
- Born: Peter Hanbury Masfen; 9 August 1941 (age 85) Auckland, New Zealand
- Occupations: Businessman; philanthropist
- Height: 189 cm (6 ft 2 in)
- Weight: 88 kg (194 lb)

Sport
- Country: New Zealand
- Sport: Rowing

Peter Hanbury Masfen CNZM (born 9 August 1941) is a New Zealand businessman, philanthropist, and former representative rower. Regarded as one of the country's most astute businessmen, he is best known for his former shareholding in Montana Wines.

== Private life ==
Masfen was born in 1941 in Auckland, New Zealand. He received his schooling at King's School and then King's College in Auckland. When he worked for Porter Wigglesworth & Grayburn, he married Joanna Porter, the daughter of principal Rolf Porter. Their sons are Rolf and Anatole and daughter Eugenie.

== Involvement in rowing ==
After having received an invitation to the Henley Royal Regatta, he won the inaugural Prince Philip Challenge Cup regatta in 1963 in Henley-on-Thames. That year, the Henley regatta was regarded as the event that came closest to a world championship. Darien Boswell, Dudley Storey and Alistair Dryden made up the other rowers, and Bob Page was the cox.

The same coxed four team then went to the 1964 Summer Olympics in Tokyo, where they placed a disappointing eighth. He went to the 1966 World Rowing Championships in Bled, Yugoslavia with the eight, where the team came sixth.

Masfen worked as a rowing coach for some time. He helped fund both the New Zealand women's and men's eight to attend the 2015 World Rowing Championships in Aiguebelette-le-Lac, France, and the 2016 Summer Olympics in Rio de Janeiro, Brazil.

== Professional life ==
Masfen started his professional life as an accountant for the accounting firm Porter Wigglesworth & Grayburn, where he eventually became a partner. He consolidated a number of business interest into Collingwood Holdings, which became Corporate Investments Ltd. He invested in the winemaker Montana Group and held 21% of its shares until 2001, when the winemaker was taken over by Allied Domecq. From 2001 to 2005, Masfen was one of the New Zealand representatives on the APEC Business Advisory Council (ABAC). In 2003, he took a 50% shareholding in the 14,000 hectares (35,000 acres) Mount Linton Station near Ohai in Southland.

Masfen is regarded as "one of New Zealand's most shrewd businessmen" and he has often displayed counter-cyclical investment, with a tendency to holding companies longer term. The Masfen family is on the rich list published by the National Business Review. In 2006, the family wealth was estimated at NZ$330m, and this had increased to over NZ$400m by 2015.

== Honours and awards ==
Masfen was inducted into the New Zealand Business Hall of Fame in 2002. He was appointed a Companion of the New Zealand Order of Merit in the 2016 New Year Honours, for services to business and philanthropy.
