= Brian Lacey (sport shooter) =

New Zealand sport shooter

Medal record

Representing New Zealand

Men's shooting

British Empire and Commonwealth Games
Silver medal – second place	1966 Kingston	50 metre rifle prone

Brian Edward Lacey (1921-2002) was a competitive rifle shooter from New Zealand.

At the 1966 British Empire and Commonwealth Games he won the silver medal in the men's 50 metre rifle prone event.

Lacey died in 2002.
