= John McCombe (fencer) =

Welsh fencer

Personal information
- Nationality: British (Welsh)
- Born: Wales

Sport
- Sport: Fencing
- Event: Foil
- Club: Cardiff Fencing Club

John McCombe was a fencer from Wales, who competed at the 1958 British Empire and Commonwealth Games and the 1962 British Empire and Commonwealth Games (now Commonwealth Games).

== Biography ==
McCombe from Whitchurch, was a member of the Cardiff Fencing Club and the 1958 Welsh foil champion.

He represented the 1958 Welsh team at the 1958 British Empire and Commonwealth Games in Cardiff, Wales, where he participated in the individual foil event.

McCombe appeared at a second Commonwealth Games when he represented the 1962 Welsh team at the 1962 British Empire and Commonwealth Games in Perth, Australia, where he participated in the foil and sabre events.
