= Murray Lawrence (rower) =

New Zealand rower

Medal record

Men's rowing

Representing New Zealand

British Empire and Commonwealth Games
Silver medal – second place	1962 Perth	Coxless pair

Murray Lawrence is a former New Zealand rower.

At the 1962 British Empire and Commonwealth Games he won the silver medal in the men's coxless pairs partnering Graham Lawrence.
