= Robert Reynolds (fencer) =

Welsh fencer

Personal information
- Nationality: British (Welsh)
- Born: c.1944 East Glamorgan, Wales

Sport
- Sport: Fencing
- Event(s): Foil, Épée
- Club: Cardiff Fencing Club; Salle Reynolds Fencing Club

Robert G. Reynolds (born 1944) is a former fencer from Wales, who competed at three Commonwealth Games.

== Biography ==
Reynolds was born to a fencing family, his father was the leading Welsh fencing coach Professor Glynne S. Reynolds and his mother Jackie Reynolds was a four-times Welsh foil champion. In February 1957, the family, which included three other siblings; Andrew, Valerie and Frances, all emigrated to Southern Rhodesia. At the time Robert was a Welsh junior foil champion in 1956 and eighth in the senior foil championships in 1957.

The family returned to Wales and Robert was a member of the Cardiff Fencing Club and later the Salle Reynolds Fencing Club. He represented the 1962 Welsh team at the 1962 British Empire and Commonwealth Games in Perth, Australia, where he participated in the foil and Épée events. His mother Jackie Reynolds also competed at the same Games.

In 1966 he went to his second Commonwealth Games, competing for the 1966 Welsh team in Kingston, Jamaica and at the 1970 British Commonwealth Games in Edinburgh he went to his third Games. His siblings Andrew and Frances also competed at the 1966 and 1970 Games
