= Alexander Leckie =

British fencer (born 1938)

Sandy Leckie
Personal information
- Nationality: British (Scottish)
- Born: 25 March 1938 (age 88) Watford, England

Sport
- Sport: Fencing
- Event: Sabre
- Club: Salle Nicklen Fencing Club
Medal record
Fencing
Representing Scotland
British Empire & Commonwealth Games
Gold medal – first place	1962 Perth	foil
Silver medal – second place	1966 Kingston	sabre
Gold medal – first place	1970 Edinburgh	sabre
Silver medal – second place	1970 Edinburgh	sabre team

Alexander Mallace Leckie (born 25 March 1938) better known as Sandy Leckie is a British fencer. He competed at the 1960, 1964 and 1968 Summer Olympics.

== Biography ==
Leckie attended the University of Oxford.

He represented Scotland at three editions of the Commonwealth Games between 1958 and 1966. In 1962 in Perth, Australia, he won the gold medal in the individual foil event. Leckie planned to defend his Commonwealth Games foil title for the Scottish team at the 1966 British Empire and Commonwealth Games in Kingston, Jamaica, but received a cut to the leg that requires stitches. He did however go on to win a silver medal in the sabre event.

Leckie won gold in the individual sabre and silver in the team sabre competition at the 1970 British Commonwealth Games in Edinburgh. He was the flag bearer for the Scotland Team at the opening ceremony.

Of his three Olympic appearances his best result was reaching the last 16 in 1968 Games in Mexico City.

Leckie was an eight times British fencing champion, winning three foil titles and five sabre titles at the British Fencing Championships, from 1961 to 1968.

In 2014, Leckie was awarded an honorary degree from the University of Glasgow in recognition of his sporting success.
