= Tom Sutherland (sport shooter) =

New Zealand sport shooter (1932–2008)

Personal information
- Full name: Thomas Norman Sutherland
- Born: 30 December 1932 Masterton, New Zealand
- Died: 20 November 2008 (aged 75) Havelock North, New Zealand

Sport
- Country: New Zealand
- Sport: Shooting
Medal record
Men's shooting
Representing New Zealand
British Empire and Commonwealth Games
Bronze medal – third place	1966 Kingston	Fullbore rifle

Thomas Norman "Buster" Sutherland (30 December 1932 – 20 November 2008) was a New Zealand competitive rifle shooter. At the 1966 British Empire and Commonwealth Games he won the bronze medal in the men's fullbore rifle event. He was the first New Zealander to win a Commonwealth Games medal in shooting.

Born in Masterton on 30 December 1932, Sutherland was one of 16 children. In the early 1950s, he joined the Masterton/Opaki Rifle Club and went on to represent New Zealand internationally for 18 years between 1960 and 1978, and was runner-up in the Ballinger Belt three times, in 1970, 1971 and 1979. In 1987, Sutherland was chosen for the New Zealand fullbore rifle shooting team to compete in the 1988 Palmer Match in Australia. The Palmer Match was a long-running teams shooting competition held every four years between teams from Australia, the United Kingdom, The United States, Canada and New Zealand.

Sutherland died in Havelock North on 20 November 2008, at the age of 75.
