= George Birks =

English fencer

Personal information
- Nationality: British (English)

Sport
- Sport: Fencing
- Event: Sabre
- Club: London Polytechnic Fencing Club
Medal record
Men's fencing
Representing England
British Empire & Commonwealth Games
Gold medal – first place	1962 Perth	sabre team

George T. Birks is a former fencer from England, who won a gold medal at the Commonwealth Games.

== Biography ==
Birks represented the England team at the 1962 British Empire and Commonwealth Games in Perth, Australia. He competed in the sabre events, winning a gold medal.

He was a member of the London Polytechnic Fencing Club where he was a pupil of Bela Imregi.
