= Leslie Arthur =

New Zealand rower

Medal record

Men's rowing

Representing New Zealand

British Empire and Commonwealth Games
Silver medal – second place	1962 Perth	Eight

Leslie Arthur is a former New Zealand rower.

At the 1962 British Empire and Commonwealth Games he won the silver medal as part of the men's eight alongside crew members Darien Boswell, Colin Cordes, Alistair Dryden, Alan Grey, Christian Larsen, Louis Lobel, Robert Page and Alan Webster.
