= Theresa Offredy =

British fencer (1930–2017)

Personal information
- Nationality: British (English)
- Born: 4 May 1930 Hendon, England
- Died: 17 April 2017 (aged 86)
- Height: 165 cm (5 ft 5 in)
- Weight: 60 kg (132 lb)

Sport
- Sport: Fencing
- Event: Foil
- Club: Polytechnic Fencing Club

Theresa Mary Offredy (4 May 1930 – 17 April 2017) was a British fencer who competed at the 1964 Summer Olympics..

== Biography ==
At the 1960 Olympic Games in Rome, she was selected as reserve for the women's team foil event.

Offredy represented the England team at the 1962 British Empire and Commonwealth Games in Perth, Australia, where she competed in the foil events.

At the 1964 Olympic Games in Tokyo, she one again participated in the women's team foil event.

Offredy died in April 2017 at the age of 86.
