= Warren Nisbet =

New Zealand wrestler

Medal record

Men's wrestling

Representing New Zealand

British Empire and Commonwealth Games
Bronze medal – third place	1962 Perth	52 kg

Warren Nisbet is a former wrestler from New Zealand.

He competed at the 1962 British Empire and Commonwealth Games where he won the bronze medal in the men's 52 kg (flyweight) grade.
