= Paul Gerritsen =

New Zealand rower

Medal record

Representing New Zealand

Men's rowing

World Under-23 Rowing Championships
Gold medal – first place	2006 Hazewinkel, Belgium	Coxed four

World Rowing Championships
Bronze medal – third place	2006 Eton, UK	Coxed four

Paul Gerritsen (born 8 December 1984) is a New Zealand rower. He was a member of the world champion under-23 coxed four in 2006 also winning a bronze medal at the senior world championships the same year.

== Early life ==
Gerritsen was born in Cambridge, New Zealand and attended St Paul's Collegiate School in nearby Hamilton. He started rowing with the school club in 2000, where he was coached by three time Olympian Ian Wright.

In 2002 and 2003, Gerritsen was part of the U19 Eight that won the Maadi Cup – the first two wins in the school's history.

== International rowing ==
In 2006, Gerritsen was selected as the number three oarsman in the New Zealand coxed four, along with James Dallinger, Steven Cottle, Dane Boswell and cox Daniel Quigley. They won gold at the FISA Under 23 World Champs in Hazewinkel, Belgium, and Bronze at the World Championships in Eton, UK.
