= Christian Larsen (rower) =

New Zealand rower

Medal record

Men's rowing

Representing New Zealand

British Empire and Commonwealth Games
Silver medal – second place	1962 Perth	Eight

Christian Larsen is a former New Zealand rower.

At the 1962 British Empire and Commonwealth Games he won the silver medal as part of the men's eight alongside crew members Leslie Arthur, Darien Boswell, Colin Cordes, Alistair Dryden, Alan Grey, Louis Lobel, Robert Page and Alan Webster.
