= Daniel Thomas Quigley =

American physician and surgeon

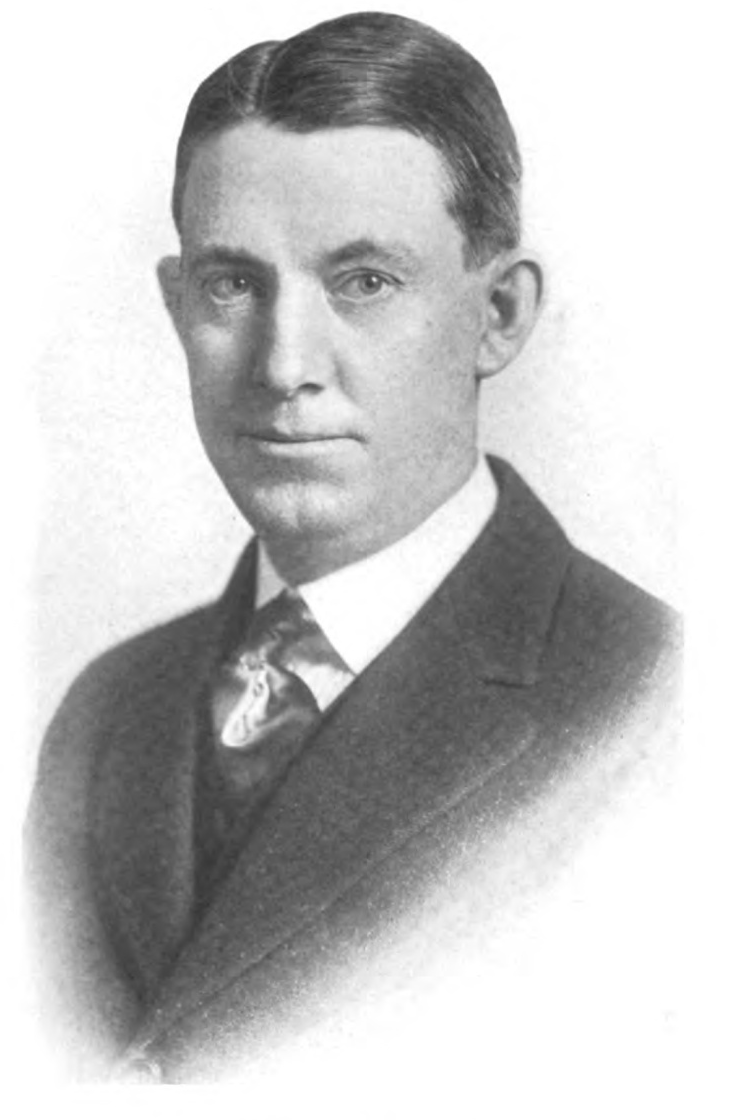
- Born: 27 June 1876; Edgerton, Wisconsin
- Died: 2 October 1968 (aged 92); Omaha, Nebraska
- Occupations: Physician, writer

Daniel Thomas Quigley (27 June 1876 – 2 October 1968) was an American physician, surgeon and writer.

== Biography ==
Quigley was born in Edgerton, Wisconsin. His father was Thomas Barlett Quigley. In 1902, he obtained his M.D. from Rush Medical College. He studied at Englewood Hospital under surgeon John Benjamin Murphy. He worked in North Platte, Nebraska (1903–1913).

He married Helen Seyferth on June 15, 1904. They had one son Thomas Bartlett Quigley born May 24, 1908. Quigley did postgraduate work (1913–1914) in London, Vienna and Paris. He was a founder of the American College of Surgeons. In 1916, he helped the founding of the American Radium Society. In 1917, he opened the Radium Hospital in Omaha. He was a surgical pathologist in charge of radium therapy at University of Nebraska College of Medicine until 1931. He practiced radiotherapy at his office in the Omaha Medical Arts Building until 1966. He retired at the age of 90 due to generalized arteriosclerosis.

Quigley was a member of the American Medical Association and the American College of Surgeons.

== Radium ==
Quigley was one of the first physicians to use radium to treat cancer in the United States. In 1922, he stated "the position of radium and x-ray in regard to cancer is just as well established and proven as is the position of quinine in malaria or salvarsan in syphilis and the only person who rejects such evidence is the person who does not want to know the truth."

In 1929, Quigley authored The Conquest of Cancer by Radium and Other Methods. It was positively reviewed in the Journal of the American Medical Association but the reviewer noted that a weakness of the book was that it did not describe the methods of how the radium was used in treatment. Another reviewer noticed this, commenting "in no case is filtration mentioned and even the manner of application and the form in which the radium was used, are often omitted". It was negatively reviewed in the Annals of Internal Medicine which described it as "an extraordinary collection of pathological ignorance and misconceptions".

== Nutrition ==
Quigley was also an advocate of nutritional therapy to treat cancer and recommended that people eat a vitamin-rich diet to prevent disease. In his book Notes and Vitamins and Diet (1933), Quigley reported results from his and others clinical work which concluded that consumption of processed foods like cakes, candy, cookies, sweets, white bread and white flour is responsible for the high incidence of degenerative diseases in the United States.

== Selected publications ==
- Radiotherapy in Cancer (1921)
- Some Observations on Breast Cancer (1925)
- The Conquest of Cancer by Radium and Other Methods (1929)
- Notes on Vitamins and Diets (1933)
- The National Malnutrition (1950)
