= Dick Johnstone =

New Zealand cyclist (1936–2022)

Personal information
- Full name: Richard Davis Johnstone
- Born: 23 June 1936 Invercargill, New Zealand
- Died: 18 November 2022 (aged 86) Auckland, New Zealand
- Height: 183 cm (6 ft 0 in)
- Weight: 94 kg (207 lb)

Cycling career
- Sport: Cycling

Major wins
- 1957 New Zealand Road Cycling Champion, 1960 Inaugural Dulux 6 day Race Winner, 1963 Tour of Southland Winner, Tour of Waikato Winner. 1987 Alwyn Moon Memorial Award.

Richard Davis Johnstone (23 June 1936 – 18 November 2022) was a New Zealand track and road cyclist who participated in the 1964 Summer Olympic games, the 1958 and 1962 Commonwealth Games.

Johnstone went as an official to two Commonwealth Games, 1986 Edinburgh, Scotland and 1994 Victoria, Canada. He was elected as an official of the boycotted 1980 Moscow Olympic Games.

Johnstone was a New Zealand National Track cycling coach (1976–1994) and coached the winning team Tour of the Future (1992) in Arizona, United States. He was a New Zealand Cycling Selector.

Johnstone died in Auckland on 18 November 2022, at the age of 86.
