= Alan Webster (rower) =

New Zealand rower

Personal information
- Full name: Alan John Webster
- Born: 18 August 1941 (age 84) Te Puke, New Zealand
- Height: 190 cm (6 ft 3 in)
- Weight: 86 kg (190 lb)

Sport
- Sport: Rowing
Medal record
Men's rowing
Representing New Zealand
British Empire and Commonwealth Games
Silver medal – second place	1962 Perth	Eight

Alan John Webster (born 18 August 1941) is a former New Zealand rower.

Webster was born in Te Puke in 1941.

At the 1962 British Empire and Commonwealth Games he won the silver medal as part of the men's eight alongside crew members Leslie Arthur, Darien Boswell, Colin Cordes, Alistair Dryden, Alan Grey, Christian Larsen, Louis Lobel and Robert Page.

Webster competed at two Olympic Games, first in 1964 where he was part of the men's eight that made the quarter-finals. Then in 1968 where he was again part of the men's eight that came fourth in the final.
