= Alan Grey =

New Zealand rower

Medal record

Men's rowing

Representing New Zealand

British Empire and Commonwealth Games
| Silver medal – second place | 1962 Perth | Eight |

Alan Grey is a former New Zealand rower.

At the 1962 British Empire and Commonwealth Games he won the silver medal as part of the men's eight alongside crew members Leslie Arthur, Darien Boswell, Colin Cordes, Alistair Dryden, Christian Larsen, Louis Lobel, Robert Page and Alan Webster.
