= Les Tornallyay =

Australian fencer

Personal information
- Born: 14 August 1931
- Died: 26 July 2009 (aged 77)

Sport
- Sport: Fencing
Medal record
Fencing
Representing Australia
British Empire Games
Silver medal – second place	1966 Kingston	Men's Team Sabre
Bronze medal – third place	1970 Edinburgh	Men's Team Sabre

Les Tornallyay (14 August 1931 – 26 July 2009) was an Australian fencer. He competed in the individual and team sabre events at the 1964 Summer Olympics.
