= Murray Watkinson =

New Zealand rower (1939–2004)

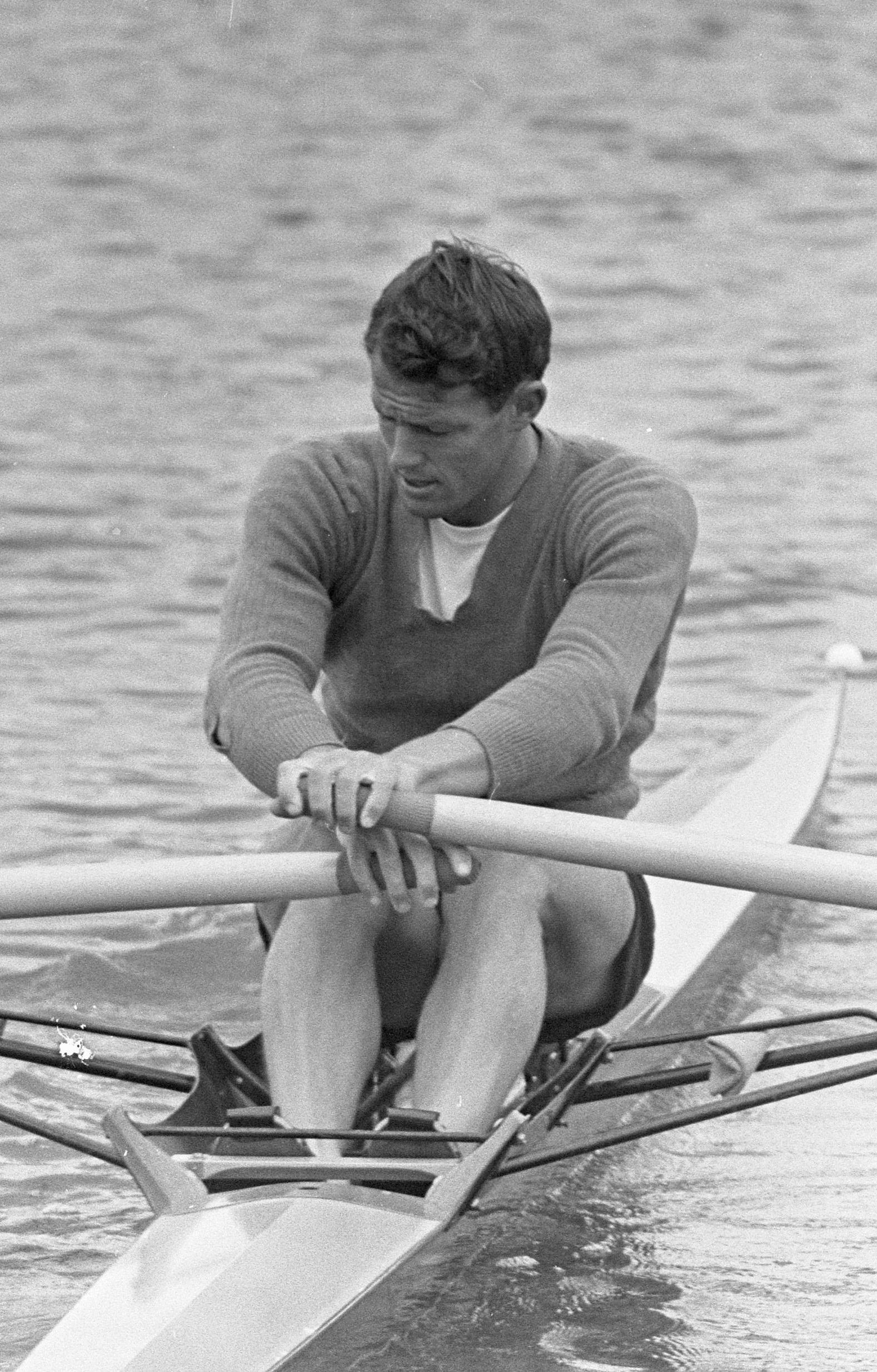
- Watkinson in 1964

Personal information
- Born: 11 June 1939 Auckland, New Zealand
- Died: 19 January 2004 (aged 64)
- Height: 1.84 m (6 ft 0 in)
- Weight: 84 kg (185 lb)

Sport
- Sport: Rowing
- Club: West End Rowing Club
Medal record
Representing New Zealand
World Rowing Championships
Bronze medal – third place	1970 St. Catharines	Eight
European Rowing Championships
Bronze medal – third place	1971 Copenhagen	Single sculls
British Empire and Commonwealth Games
Silver medal – second place	1962 Perth	Double sculls

Murray Paul Watkinson (11 June 1939 – 19 January 2004) was a New Zealand rower. He competed at the 1964 and 1972 Summer Olympics in the single sculls and placed fifth and tenth, respectively. He won a European bronze medal in this event in 1971.

Watkinson was born in 1939. He started training at the West End Rowing Club in 1953 when he was 13 years old. He won his first major title, a silver medal in the double sculls, at the 1962 British Empire and Commonwealth Games, partnering with his brother Peter. At the 1964 European Rowing Championships in Amsterdam, he came fourth in the single sculls. Two months later at the 1964 Summer Olympics in Tokyo, he came fifth. Watkinson competed as one of the favourites in single sculls at the 1967 European Rowing Championships in Vichy, France, but did not reach the final.

Watkinson's health declined during his later years. He was one of the few New Zealanders to have received a heart-liver transplant. He died in 2004.
