= Janet Hopner =

Australian fencer

Personal information
- Born: 15 January 1936 (age 90)

Sport
- Sport: Fencing
Medal record
Representing Australia
British Empire Games
Bronze medal – third place	1962 Perth	Women's Foil

Janet Hopner (born 15 January 1936) is an Australian fencer. She competed in the women's individual and team foil events at the 1964 Summer Olympics.
