= Bill Baillie =

New Zealand runner (1934–2018)

Bill Baillie MNZM
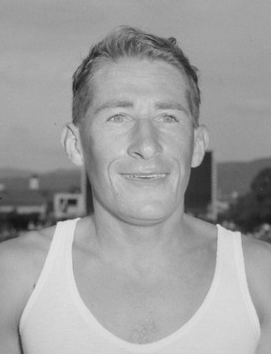
- Baillie in 1958

Personal information
- Born: William David Baillie; 28 May 1934 Nelson, New Zealand
- Died: 25 December 2018 (aged 84) Cooks Beach, New Zealand
- Height: 1.69 m (5 ft 6 1/2 in)
- Weight: 65 kg (143 lb)

Sport
- Country: New Zealand
- Sport: Track and field
- Coached by: Arthur Lydiard

Achievements and titles
- National finals: 880 yards champion (1954, 1955); 1 mile champion (1958, 1961); 3 miles champion (1956); 6 miles champion (1959, 1960, 1963, 1964, 1965, 1966, 1967); Cross-country champion (1960, 1963); 10 miles road race champion (1965)
- Personal bests: 880 yds – 1:52.3; 1 mile – 3:59.2; 5000 m – 13:40.0; 20,000 m – 59:28.6

William David Baillie MNZM (28 May 1934 – 25 December 2018) was a New Zealand runner, who represented his country at the 1964 Summer Olympics in Tokyo. There, he placed sixth in the 5000 m. He also competed at the 1954, 1958, 1962, and 1966 British Empire and Commonwealth Games. At the time of his death, he held New Zealand records for the 20000 m and the 1 hour events.

In the 2001 Queen's Birthday Honours, Baillie was appointed a Member of the New Zealand Order of Merit, for services to athletics.

Baillie died in Cooks Beach on 25 December 2018 at the age of 84.

== Personal bests ==
Distance	Time	Place	Date
880 yards	1:52.3	Vancouver	1954
1 mile	3:59.2	Wanganui	1964
5000 m	13:40.0	Compton	1964
20000 m	59:28.6 NR	Auckland	1963
1 hour	20190m NR	Auckland	1963

Awards
Preceded by Peter Snell	Lonsdale Cup of the New Zealand Olympic Committee; 1963	Succeeded by Peter Snell
