= Margaret Macrae =

New Zealand swimmer

Medal record

Women's swimming

Representing New Zealand

British Empire and Commonwealth Games
| Bronze medal – third place | 1966 Kingston | 220 yards Backstroke |

Margaret Macrae is a former swimming representative from New Zealand.

At the 1966 British Empire and Commonwealth Games she won the bronze medal in the women's 220 yards backstroke. During the Games she competed in a variety of events including the 110 yards backstroke, 440 yards freestyle and 440 yards medley relay.

Macrae competed at the previous British Empire and Commonwealth Games in Perth where she came 7th in both the 110 and 220 yards backstroke.
