= Darien Boswell =

New Zealand rower

Personal information
- Full name: Darien Graham Boswell
- Born: 23 May 1938 Auckland, New Zealand
- Died: 11 February 2018 (aged 79) Kerikeri, New Zealand
- Height: 191 cm (6 ft 3 in)
- Weight: 83 kg (183 lb)
- Relative: Dane Boswell (son)

Sport
- Sport: Rowing
Medal record
Men's rowing
Representing New Zealand
British Empire and Commonwealth Games
Silver medal – second place	1962 Perth	Eight

Darien Graham Boswell (23 May 1938 – 11 February 2018) was a New Zealand rower.

Boswell was born in Auckland in 1938. At the 1962 British Empire and Commonwealth Games he won the silver medal as part of the men's eight alongside crew members Leslie Arthur, Colin Cordes, Alistair Dryden, Alan Grey, Christian Larsen, Louis Lobel, Robert Page and Alan Webster. After having received an invitation to the Henley Royal Regatta, he won the inaugural Prince Philip Challenge Cup regatta in 1963 in Henley-on-Thames. That year, the Henley regatta was regarded as the event that came closest to a world championship. Dudley Storey, Peter Masfen and Alistair Dryden made up the other rowers, and Bob Page was the cox.

The same coxed four team then went to the 1964 Summer Olympics in Tokyo, where they placed a disappointing eighth. His son, Dane Boswell, has also represented New Zealand in rowing.

Boswell died at Kerikeri on 11 February 2018.
