= Dot Coleman =

New Zealand fencer

Medal record

Women's fencing

British Empire and Commonwealth Games

Representing New Zealand
Gold medal – first place	1962 Perth	Individual foil

Representing Australia
Silver medal – second place	1966 Kingston	Team foil

Melody Ann "Dot" Gard (née Coleman; 28 February 1936 – 1 September 2015) was a New Zealand fencer.

She won the gold medal in the women's individual foil at the 1962 British Empire and Commonwealth Games. She represented Australia at the 1966 British Empire and Commonwealth Games where she won a silver medal.
