= John Andru =

Canadian fencer (1932–2003)

Personal information
- Born: 20 November 1932 Toronto, Ontario, Canada
- Died: 15 March 2003 (aged 70) Newmarket, Ontario, Canada

Sport
- Sport: Fencing

John Andru (20 November 1932 – 15 March 2003) was a Canadian fencer. He competed at the 1964 and 1968 Summer Olympics. He was inducted into the Canadian Olympic Hall of Fame.
