= Robert Page (rower) =

New Zealand rower (1936–1991)

Bob Page
Personal information
- Born: Robert Edward Page; 14 September 1936 Auckland, New Zealand
- Died: 14 April 1991 (aged 54) New Zealand
- Height: 1.65 m (5 ft 5 in)
- Weight: 51 kg (112 lb)

Sport
- Sport: Rowing
Medal record
Men's rowing
Representing New Zealand
British Empire and Commonwealth Games
Silver medal – second place	1962 Perth	Eight

Robert Edward Page ( 14 September 1936 – 14 April 1991) was a New Zealand rowing cox.

At the 1962 British Empire and Commonwealth Games he won the silver medal as part of the men's eight alongside crew members Leslie Arthur, Darien Boswell, Colin Cordes, Alistair Dryden, Alan Grey, Christian Larsen, Louis Lobel and Alan Webster. After having received an invitation to the Henley Royal Regatta, he won the inaugural Prince Philip Challenge Cup regatta in 1963 in Henley-on-Thames. That year, the Henley regatta was regarded as the event that came closest to a world championship. Darien Boswell, Peter Masfen, Dudley Storey, and Alistair Dryden made up the rowers, and Page was the cox.

The same coxed four team then went to the 1964 Summer Olympics in Tokyo, where they placed eighth. At the 1968 Summer Olympics in Mexico he was part of the men's eight that came fourth in the final.

Page died on 14 April 1991, and was cremated at Purewa Crematorium in Auckland.
