= Alistair Dryden =

New Zealand rower

Personal information
- Born: Alistair Garth Dryden; 18 December 1942 (age 83) Auckland, New Zealand
- Height: 196 cm (6 ft 5 in)
- Weight: 95 kg (209 lb)
- Relatives: Jim Dryden (father); Murdoch Dryden (son)

Sport
- Sport: Rowing
Medal record
Men's rowing
Representing New Zealand
British Empire and Commonwealth Games
Silver medal – second place	1962 Perth	Eight

Alistair Garth Dryden (born 18 December 1942) is a former New Zealand rower.

Dryden was born in 1942 in Auckland, New Zealand. The wrestler Jim Dryden (1907–1974) was his father. He received his education at King's College.

At the 1962 British Empire and Commonwealth Games he won the silver medal as part of the men's eight alongside crew members Leslie Arthur, Darien Boswell, Colin Cordes, Alan Grey, Christian Larsen, Louis Lobel, Robert Page and Alan Webster. After having received an invitation to the Henley Royal Regatta, he won the inaugural Prince Philip Challenge Cup regatta in 1963 in Henley-on-Thames. That year, the Henley regatta was regarded as the event that came closest to a world championship. Darien Boswell, Peter Masfen and Dudley Storey made up the other rowers, and Bob Page was the cox.

The same coxed four team then went to the 1964 Summer Olympics in Tokyo, where they placed a disappointing eighth. At the 1968 Summer Olympics in Mexico he was part of the men's eight that came fourth in the final.

Dryden was later the president of the Auckland Rowing Club. Dryden's son, Murdoch Dryden, would later represent New Zealand at World Rowing Championships.
