= Robert Foxcroft =

Canadian fencer (1934–2009)

Personal information
- Born: Robert Samuel Foxcroft; 17 August 1934 London, Ontario, Canada
- Died: 20 November 2009 (aged 75) Scarborough, Ontario, Canada

Sport
- Sport: Fencing

Robert Foxcroft (17 August 1934 – 20 November 2009) was a Canadian competitive fencer and sports coach. He competed at the 1964 and 1972 Summer Olympics and at three Pan American Games, two Commonwealth Games and two World Championships. He coached the Western University men’s and women’s fencing teams from 1969 to 1981 when they won four Ontario Championships.
