= Jackie Reynolds =

Welsh fencer (1920–2021)

Jackie Reynolds née Gooding
Personal information
- Nationality: British (Welsh)
- Born: 17 March 1920 Cardiff, Wales
- Died: 18 March 2021 (aged 101)

Sport
- Sport: Fencing
- Event: Foil
- Club: Cardiff Fencing Club

Beatrice Ada Reynolds (née Gooding; 17 March 1920 – 18 March 2021), also known as Jackie Reynolds, was a Welsh fencer, who competed at the 1958 British Empire and Commonwealth Games for Southern Rhodesia and the 1962 British Empire and Commonwealth Games for Wales.

== Biography ==
Born Beatrice Ada Gooding in Cardiff on 17 March 1920, she married the leading Welsh fencing coach Professor Glynne S. Reynolds in 1940 and started fencing in 1952. In February 1957, the family, which included four children; Andrew, Robert, Valerie and Frances, all emigrated to Southern Rhodesia. At the time Jackie (as she was known) was a member of the Cardiff Fencing Club and was a four-times Welsh foil champion.

Reynolds subsequently competed for Southern Rhodesia at the 1958 British Empire and Commonwealth Games held in Cardiff, Wales participating in the individual foil event.

Four years later she appeared at a second Commonwealth Games but this time was representing the 1962 Welsh team at the 1962 British Empire and Commonwealth Games in Perth, Australia, where she participated in the individual foil event once again.

One of her sons Robert Reynolds also competed at the same Games.

Robert, her other son Andrew Reynolds and her daughter Frances Reynolds would compete at the 1966 British Empire and Commonwealth Games in Kingston, Jamaica and the 1970 British Commonwealth Games in Edinburgh.

Jackie Reynolds died on 18 March 2021, one day after her 101st birthday.
