= Michael Henderson (fencer) =

New Zealand fencer (1935–2025)

Mike Henderson
Personal information
- Born: Michael Lindsay Henderson; 10 October 1935
- Died: 22 August 2025 (aged 89) Warkworth, New Zealand

Sport
- Country: New Zealand
- Sport: Fencing
Medal record
Representing New Zealand
Men's Fencing
British Empire and Commonwealth Games
Bronze medal – third place	1962 Perth	Team sabre

Michael Lindsay Henderson (10 October 1935 – 22 August 2025) was a New Zealand fencer who won a bronze medal representing his country at the 1962 British Empire and Commonwealth Games.

== Biography ==
Henderson was born on 10 October 1935. He won the bronze medal as part of the New Zealand men's sabre team at the 1962 British Empire and Commonwealth Games in Perth alongside Bob Binning and Brian Pickworth. At those games, he also competed in the team foil event with Brian Pickworth and Keith Mann, finishing fifth, and in the individual men's foil and sabre events where he did not progress to the final pool stages.

In 1965, Henderson won the men's sabre title at the New Zealand national fencing championships.

At the time of the 1966 British Empire and Commonwealth Games, Henderson was working as a salesman. At those games, he finished sixth in the men's individual foil but did not progress beyond the elimination round of the individual sabre. In the teams events, he was a member of the New Zealand trios that finished fourth in both the sabre and foil competitions.

Henderson attended the 1970 British Commonwealth Games in Edinburgh, where he represented New Zealand in the team and individual events in all three disciplines, namely foil, sabre, and épée. He did not progress beyond the pool stages of any of the individual events. The New Zealand épée team finished in fourth place, while the foil and sabre teams reached the semi-final stages.

Henderson died in Warkworth on 22 August 2025, at the age of 89.
