= Don Oliver =

New Zealand weightlifter (1937–1996)

Don Oliver OBE
Personal information
- Born: Donald Carthew Oliver; 16 April 1937 Avondale, Auckland, New Zealand
- Died: 26 February 1996 (aged 58) Auckland, New Zealand
- Height: 1.93 m (6 ft 4 in)
- Weight: 124 kg (273 lb)
- Spouse: Maureen Baty (m. 1967)

Sport
- Country: New Zealand
- Sport: Weightlifting
Medal record
Men's weightlifting
Representing New Zealand
British Empire and Commonwealth Games
Gold medal – first place	1966 Kingston	Heavyweight
Silver medal – second place	1962 Perth	Heavyweight

Donald Carthew Oliver OBE (16 April 1937 – 26 February 1996) was a New Zealand weightlifter and fitness centre founder. He represented his country at three Olympic Games, and won two Commonwealth medals, including gold in 1966 in Kingston.

== Early life and family ==
Born in the Auckland suburb of Avondale on 16 April 1937, Oliver was educated at Avondale College. On 18 March 1967, he married Maureen Baty, and the couple had three children.

== Weightlifting ==
Oliver won the gold medal at the 1966 British Empire and Commonwealth Games in the men's heavyweight division. At the 1962 British Empire and Commonwealth Games he won the silver medal in the same division.

Oliver represented New Zealand at three Olympic Games in the heavyweight division. At the 1960 Summer Olympics, Oliver lifted a combined weight of 425 kg and finished in 13th place. Four years later in Tokyo at the 1964 Summer Olympics he lifted 480 kg and finished in ninth place. In his last Olympics, Oliver recorded his best finish lifting 490 kg and finishing in eighth place at the 1968 Summer Olympics in Mexico City, where he was also the New Zealand team flagbearer at the opening ceremony.

In all, Oliver won 10 New Zealand national weightlifting titles in the heavyweight division, and he was the New Zealand record holder in that division from 1959 to 1968.

At the 1974 Commonwealth Games in Christchurch, Oliver was the New Zealand weightlifting team coach.

== Work and business ==
Oliver was a butcher by trade. From 1952 to 1973, he worked as a retail butcher, production boner, and plant safety and training officer. He tutored apprentice butchers at the Manukau Technical Institute between 1973 ad 1976.

In 1975, he opened his first gym, the Don Oliver Health Centre, and he went on to own six gyms in Auckland, and start his own brand of fitness equipment. He was a personal trainer to several All Blacks, including Michael Jones, Eroni Clarke, Va'aiga Tuigamala and Craig Dowd.

== Other activities ==
Oliver served as chair of the Auckland Asthma Society, and was deacon of Glen Eden Baptist Church.

== Honours ==
In the 1981 Queen's Birthday Honours, Oliver was appointed an Officer of the Order of the British Empire, for services to weightlifting and the community.

== Death ==
Oliver died of cancer in Auckland on 26 February 1996, and he was buried at Waikumete Cemetery.

Awards
Preceded by Peter Snell	Lonsdale Cup of the New Zealand Olympic Committee; 1965	Succeeded by Valerie Young
