= Vivien Haddon =

New Zealand swimmer (born 1945)

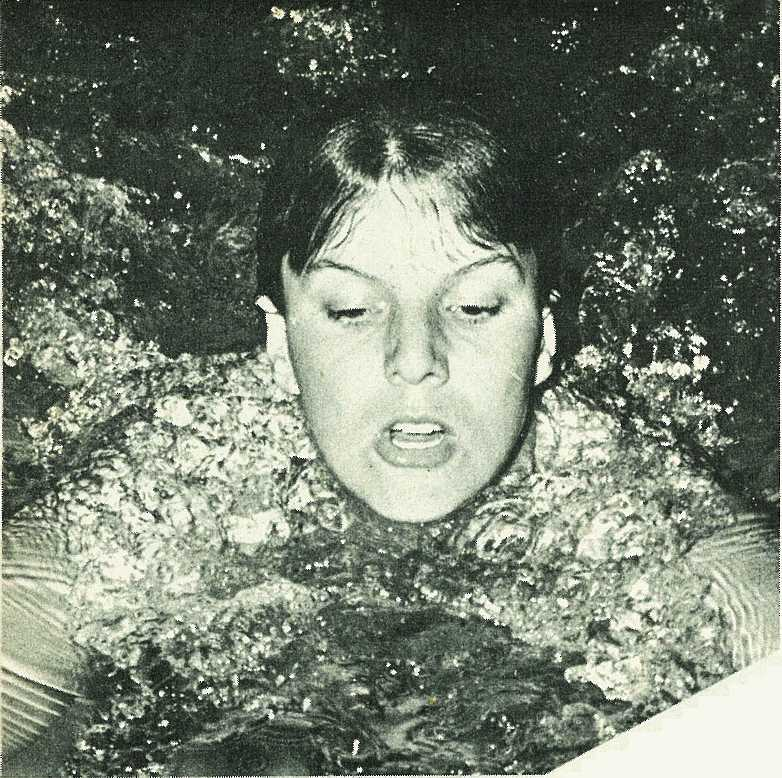

Personal information
- Born: 14 August 1945 (age 80)

Sport
- Sport: Swimming
Medal record
Representing New Zealand
British Empire and Commonwealth Games
Silver medal – second place	1962 Perth	110 yards Breaststroke
Bronze medal – third place	1962 Perth	220 yards Breaststroke
Bronze medal – third place	1966 Kingston	220 yards Breaststroke

Vivien Joan Haddon now Vivien Boyd (born 14 August 1945) is a former swimming representative from New Zealand.

At the 1962 British Empire and Commonwealth Games, she won the silver medal in the women's 110 yards breaststroke. She also won the bronze medal in the 220 yards breaststroke.

Four years later at the 1966 British Empire and Commonwealth Games in Kingston, Jamaica, she won the bronze medal in the 220 yards breaststroke.

She competed at the 1964 Summer Olympics coming second in her heat of the 200 m breaststroke.

She was educated at Freyberg High School in Palmerston North.
