= Richie Thomson =

New Zealand cyclist (1940–2012)

Personal information
- Born: 16 August 1940 Oamaru, New Zealand
- Died: 3 May 2012 (aged 71) Rotorua, New Zealand

Cycling career
- Sport: Cycling

Richard Douglas Thomson (16 August 1940 – 3 May 2012) was a New Zealand cyclist. He competed in the individual road race and the team time trial events at the 1968 Summer Olympics.
