= Valerie Young =

New Zealand shot putter and discus thrower

Valerie Young OBE
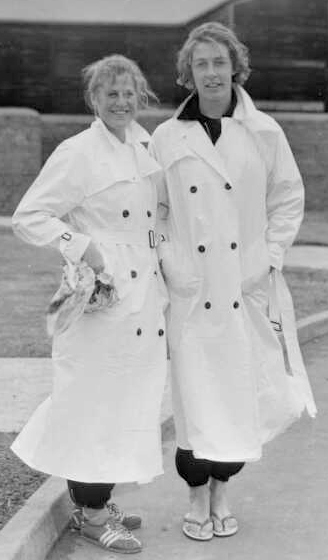
- Young (right) with Marise Chamberlain at the 1958 British Empire and Commonwealth Games

Personal information
- Full name: Valerie Isobel Marie Young
- Born: 10 August 1937 (age 88) Ashburton, New Zealand
- Height: 180 cm (5 ft 11 in)
- Weight: 75 kg (165 lb)

Sport
- Country: New Zealand
- Sport: Track and field
- Event(s): Shot put, discus throw

Achievements and titles
- National finals: Discus champion (1957–1958, 1961–1966, 1972–1973, 1975–1982); Shot put champion (1956–1966, 1972–1974, 1979–1981); Pentathlon champion (1958, 1963)
- Personal best(s): SP – 17.26 m (1964); DT – 53.77 m (1962)
Medal record
Representing New Zealand
Commonwealth Games
Gold medal – first place	1958 Cardiff	Shot put
Gold medal – first place	1962 Perth	Shot put
Gold medal – first place	1962 Perth	Discus
Gold medal – first place	1966 Kingston	Shot put
Gold medal – first place	1966 Kingston	Discus
Silver medal – second place	1974 Christchurch	Shot put
Bronze medal – third place	1958 Cardiff	Discus

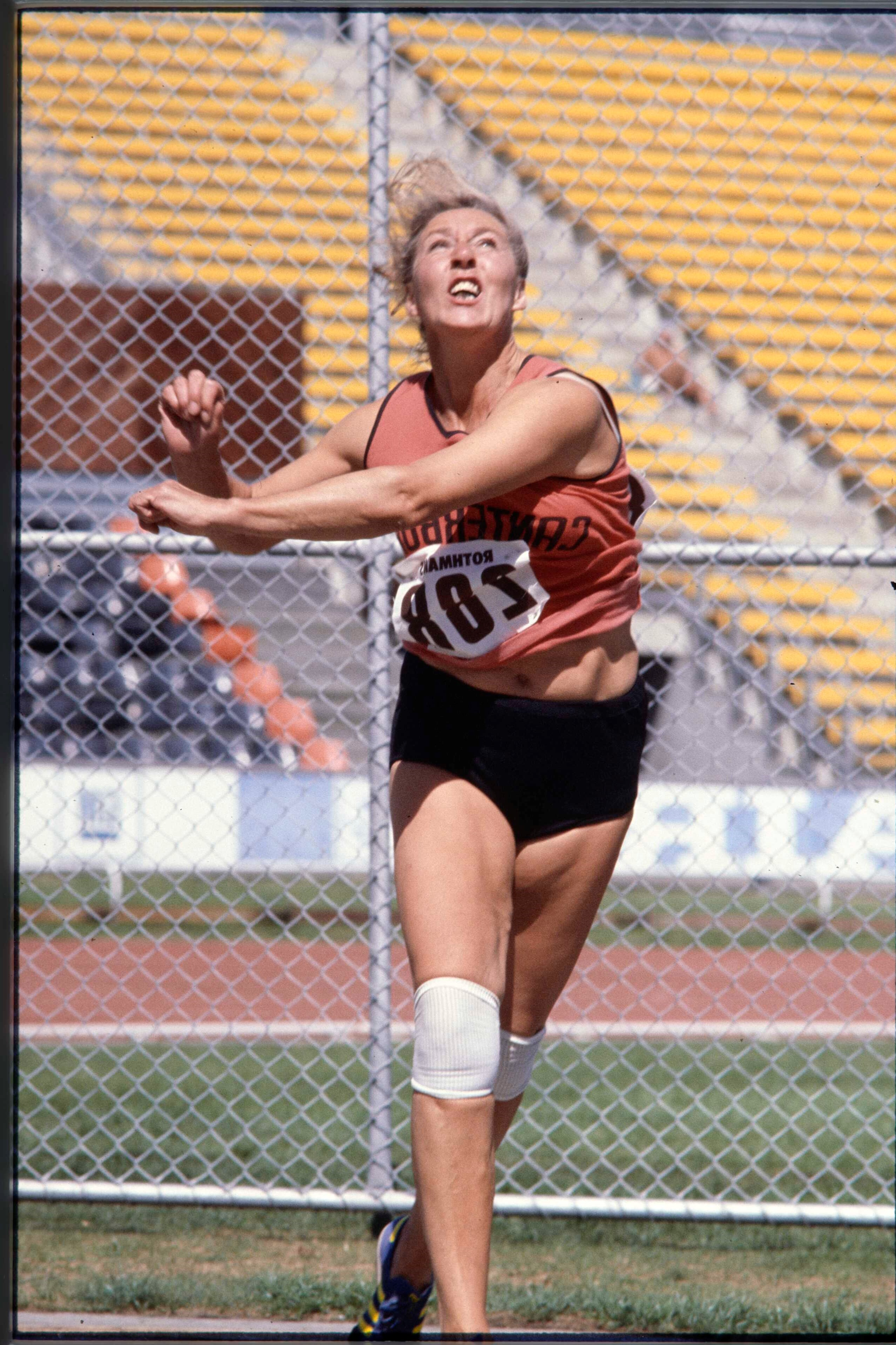
Young at the 1979 NZ Championships

Valerie Isobel Marie Young OBE (née Sloper, born 10 August 1937) is a former athlete from New Zealand. She competed at the 1958, 1962, 1966, and 1974 Commonwealth Games, and won seven medals in the shot put and discus throw. She retired after the 1966 games to have a family, but went back into training when the 1974 Games were allocated to Christchurch. She also competed at the 1956, 1960, and 1964 Summer Olympics, and went to the 1976 and 1984 games as an official (chaperone). She placed fourth in the shot put in 1960 and 1964, and fifth in 1956.

Young won the most gold medals (5) of any New Zealand competitor at the Commonwealth Games. At the national level, she has won more New Zealand titles, 37, than any other athlete, including 18 in the discus and 17 in the shot put. She also won the pentathlon title twice, in 1958 and 1963.

In the 1987 New Year Honours, Young was appointed an Officer of the Order of the British Empire, for services to athletics.

Awards
Preceded by Don Oliver	Lonsdale Cup of the New Zealand Olympic Committee; 1966	Succeeded by Dave McKenzie
