= Laurie Byers =

New Zealand cyclist and local politician (1941–2024)

Laurie Byers QSM JP
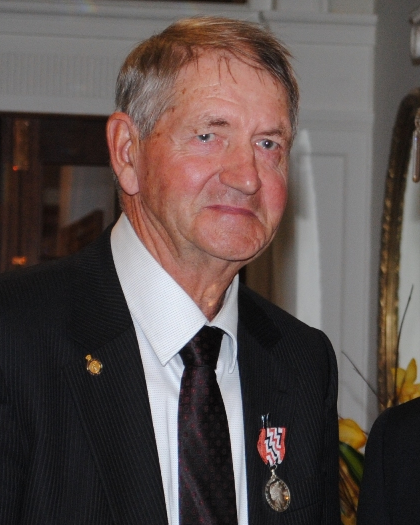
- Byers in 2012

Personal information
- Full name: Laurence John Byers
- Born: 31 March 1941 Whangārei, New Zealand
- Died: 21 July 2024 (aged 83)

Cycling career
- Sport: Cycling
Medal record
Men's cycling
Representing New Zealand
Commonwealth Games
Bronze medal – third place	1962 Perth	Road Race
Bronze medal – third place	1966 Kingston	Road Race

Laurence John Byers QSM JP (3 March 1941 – 21 July 2024) was a New Zealand racing cyclist and local politician. He won the bronze medal in the men's road race at both the 1962 and 1966 British Empire and Commonwealth Games.

Byers' only Olympic appearance was at the 1964 Summer Olympic Games where he placed 10th in the men's road race, he was also part of the team that finished 18th in the men's team time trial.

Byers later served as an elected member of the Far North District Council for 18 years, including a term as deputy mayor.

Byers died on 21 July 2024, at the age of 83.
