= Bob Binning =

New Zealand fencer

Personal information
- Born: Robert Samuel Jackson Binning; 28 November 1935
- Died: 8 August 2005 (aged 69) Queensland, Australia

Sport
- Country: New Zealand
- Sport: Fencing

Achievements and titles
- National finals: Sabre champion (1955, 1956, 1957, 1959, 1961, 1962, 1963, 1966); Épée champion (1966)
Medal record
Representing New Zealand
Men's Fencing
British Empire and Commonwealth Games
Bronze medal – third place	1962 Perth	Team sabre

Robert Samuel Jackson Binning (28 November 1935 – 8 August 2005) was a New Zealand fencer.

He won the bronze medal as part of the men's sabre team at the 1962 British Empire and Commonwealth Games. His teammates in the event were Michael Henderson and Brian Pickworth.

Binning competed individually in the sabre and épée at the 1958, 1962 and 1966 British Empire and Commonwealth Games. He won eight national titles in the men's sabre and one in the épée over his career.

Binning died in Queensland, Australia, on 8 August 2005.
