= Brian Pickworth =

New Zealand fencer (1929–2020)

Personal information
- Born: 10 August 1929 Oamaru, New Zealand
- Died: 16 December 2020 (aged 91)
- Height: 1.70 m (5 ft 7 in)
- Weight: 64 kg (141 lb)

Sport
- Country: New Zealand
- Sport: Fencing
Medal record
Men's fencing
Representing New Zealand
British Empire and Commonwealth Games
Bronze medal – third place	1962 Perth	Sabre Team

Brian Andrew Pickworth (10 August 1929 – 16 December 2020) was a New Zealand fencer.

== Biography ==
Pickworth won the bronze medal as part of the men's sabre team at the 1962 British Empire and Commonwealth Games. His teammates in the event were Bob Binning and Michael Henderson. He competed individually and in teams in the sabre, épée and foil at the 1958, 1962, 1966, and 1970 Commonwealth Games. He competed at the 1960 Summer Olympics in all three disciplines.
