= List of Commonwealth Games medallists in fencing =

This is the complete list of Commonwealth Games medallists in fencing from 1950 to 1970.

== Men's foil ==
Games	Gold	Silver	Bronze
1950	René Paul (ENG)	John Fethers (AUS)	Georges Pouliot (CAN)
1954	René Paul (ENG)	John Fethers (AUS)	Allan Jay (ENG)
1958	Raymond Paul (ENG)	Ivan Lund (AUS)	René Paul (ENG)
1962	Alexander Leckie (SCO)	Allan Jay (ENG)	Ralph Cooperman (ENG)
1966	Allan Jay (ENG)	Bill Hoskyns (ENG)	Graham Paul (ENG)
1970	Mike Breckin (ENG)	Barry Paul (ENG)	Graham Paul (ENG)

== Men's foil team ==
Games	Gold	Silver	Bronze
1950	England (ENG); Arthur Pilbrow; Robert Anderson; René Paul	New Zealand (NZL); Austen Gittos; Gordon Dearing; Murray Gittos; Malcolm Millar	Canada; Georges Pouliot; Robert Desjarlais; Edward Brooke
1954	England (ENG); Allan Jay; Ralph Cooperman; René Paul	Australia (AUS); Ivan Lund; John Fethers; Rod Steel	Canada (CAN); Carl Schwende; J.A. Howard; Roland Asselin
1958	England (ENG); Harold Cooke; Raymond Paul; René Paul	Australia (AUS); Brian McCowage; Michael Sichel; Ivan Lund	Wales (WAL); John McCombe; John Evans; Roger Maunder
1962	England (ENG); Allan Jay; Ralph Cooperman; René Paul	Australia (AUS); Brian McCowage; David McKenzie; Ivan Lund	Canada (CAN); Benedek Simo; Carl Schwende; John Andru
1966	England (ENG); Allan Jay; Graham Paul; Bill Hoskyns	Australia (AUS); Barry Wasley; Brian McCowage; John Humphreys; Russell Hobby	Scotland (SCO); George Sandor; Joseph Rorke; Robert Wilson
1970	England (ENG); Barry Paul; Graham Paul; Mike Breckin	Australia (AUS); Ernest Simon; Gregory Benko; Bill Ronald	Canada (CAN); Gerry Wiedel; Konrad Widmaier; Magdy Conyd

== Men's épée ==
Games	Gold	Silver	Bronze
1950	Charles de Beaumont (ENG)	Robert Anderson (ENG)	Ivan Lund (AUS)
1954	Ivan Lund (AUS)	René Paul (ENG)	Carl Schwende (CAN)
1958	Bill Hoskyns (ENG)	Michael Howard (ENG)	Allan Jay (ENG)
1962	Ivan Lund (AUS)	John Pelling (ENG)	Peter Jacobs (ENG)
1966	Bill Hoskyns (ENG)	John Pelling (ENG)	Robert Reynolds (WAL)
1970	Bill Hoskyns (ENG)	Lester Wong (CAN)	Peter Jacobs (ENG)

== Men's épée team ==
Games	Gold	Silver	Bronze
1950	Australia (AUS); Allan Jay; Ivan Lund; Charles Stanmore	England (ENG); René Paul; Charles de Beaumont; Robert Anderson	Canada; Georges Pouliot; Robert Desjarlais; Edward Brooke
1954	England (ENG); Allan Jay; Charles de Beaumont; René Paul	Canada (CAN); Carl Schwende; Edward Brooke; Roland Asselin	Australia (AUS); Ivan Lund; John Fethers; Laurence Harding-Smith
1958	England (ENG); Allan Jay; Bill Hoskyns; Michael Howard	Canada (CAN); Carl Schwende; John Andru; Roland Asselin	Australia (AUS); David Doyle; Ivan Lund; John Simpson
1962	England (ENG); John Pelling; Michael Howard; Peter Jacobs	Australia (AUS); Ivan Lund; John Humphreys; Mike Diamond	Canada (CAN); Carl Schwende; Peter Bakonyi; Robert Foxcroft
1966	England (ENG); Bill Hoskyns; John Pelling; Peter Jacobs	Canada (CAN); John Andru; Konrad Widmaier; Peter Bakonyi	Australia (AUS); Barry Wasley; John Humphreys; Peter Hardiman; Russell Hobby
1970	England (ENG); Bill Hoskyns; Peter Jacobs; Ralph Johnson	Scotland (SCO); George Sandor; Ian Hunter; Derek Russell	Canada (CAN); Konrad Widmaier; Lester Wong; Peter Bakonyi

== Men's sabre ==
Games	Gold	Silver	Bronze
1950	Arthur Pilbrow (ENG)	Robert Anderson (ENG)	Georges Pouliot (CAN)
1954	Michael Amberg (ENG)	Ralph Cooperman (ENG)	John Fethers (AUS)
1958	Bill Hoskyns (ENG)	Ralph Cooperman (ENG)	Michael Amberg (ENG)
1962	Ralph Cooperman (ENG)	Benedek Simo (CAN)	John Andru (CAN)
1966	Ralph Cooperman (ENG)	Alexander Leckie (SCO)	Gabor Arato (AUS)
1970	Alexander Leckie (SCO)	Rodney Craig (ENG)	Richard Cohen (ENG)

== Men's sabre team ==
Games	Gold	Silver	Bronze
1950	England (ENG); Charles de Beaumont; Arthur Pilbrow; Robert Anderson	Canada; Georges Pouliot; Robert Desjarlais; Edward Brooke	Australia (AUS); Norman Booth; Leslie Chillug; Edwin Dean; Jock Gibson
1954	Canada (CAN); Carl Schwende; Leslie Krasa; Roland Asselin	England (ENG); Ralph Cooperman; Michael Amberg; William Beatley	Australia (AUS); Ivan Lund; John Fethers; Laurence Harding-Smith; Rod Steel
1958	England (ENG); Ralph Cooperman; Eugene Verebes; Bill Hoskyns; Michael Amberg	Australia (AUS); Alexander Martonffy; Michael Sichel; Ivan Lund	Wales (WAL); John Preston; Malcolm Kerslake; Roger Maunder; T.R. Lucas
1962	England (ENG); Ralph Cooperman; George Birks; Michael Amberg	Canada (CAN); Benedek Simo; Carl Schwende; John Andru; Robert Foxcroft	New Zealand (NZL); Brian Pickworth; Michael Henderson; Bob Binning
1966	England (ENG); Ralph Cooperman; Richard Oldcorn; William Rayden	Australia (AUS); Brian McCowage; Gabor Arato; Laszlo Tornallyay	Canada (CAN); John Andru; Leslie Samek; Robert Foxcroft
1970	England (ENG); David Acfield; Rodney Craig; Richard Cohen	Scotland (SCO); A.H. Mitchell; Alexander Leckie; Gordon Wiles	Australia (AUS); Gabor Arato; Gregory Benko; Laszlo Tornallyay

== Women's foil ==
Games	Gold	Silver	Bronze
1950	Mary Glen-Haig (ENG)	Patricia Woodroffe (NZL)	Catherine Pym (AUS)
1954	Mary Glen-Haig (ENG)	Gillian Sheen (ENG)	Aileen Harding (WAL)
1958	Gillian Sheen (ENG)	Barbara McCreath (AUS)	Mary Glen-Haig (ENG)
1962	Dot Coleman (NZL)	Johanna Winter (AUS)	Janet Hopner (AUS)
1966	Janet Wardell-Yerburgh (ENG)	Shirley Parker (ENG)	Gaye McDermit (NZL)
1970	Janet Wardell-Yerburgh (ENG)	Marion Exelby (AUS)	Susan Youngs (SCO)

== Women's foil team ==
Games	Gold	Silver	Bronze
1966	England (ENG); Janet Wardell-Yerburgh; Joyce Pearce; Shirley Parker	Australia (AUS); Jeanette Beauchamp; Dot Coleman; Walburga Winter	New Zealand (NZL); Joyce Fenton; Gaye McDermit; Pam French
1970	England (ENG); Clare Henley; Janet Wardell-Yerburgh; Sue Green	Scotland (SCO); B.H. Williams; Judith Bain; Susan Youngs	Canada (CAN); Fleurette Campeau; Kay Aoyama; Pacita Wiedel

== See also ==
- Fencing at the Commonwealth Games
