= New Zealand at the 1954 British Empire and Commonwealth Games =

- CGF code: NZL
- CGA: New Zealand Olympic and British Empire Games Association
- Website: www.olympic.org.nz

in Vancouver, British Columbia, Canada
- Competitors: 56
- Flag bearers: Opening: Max Carr; Closing:
- Medals Ranked 5th: Gold 7 Silver 7 Bronze 5 Total 19

British Empire and Commonwealth Games appearances
- 1930; 1934; 1938; 1950; 1954; 1958; 1962; 1966; 1970; 1974; 1978; 1982; 1986; 1990; 1994; 1998; 2002; 2006; 2010; 2014; 2018; 2022; 2026; 2030

New Zealand at the 1954 British Empire and Commonwealth Games was represented by a team of 56 competitors and nine officials. Selection of the team for the Games in Vancouver, British Columbia, Canada, was the responsibility of the New Zealand Olympic and British Empire Games Association. New Zealand's flagbearer at the opening ceremony was Max Carr. The New Zealand team finished fifth on the medal table, winning a total of 19 medals, seven of which were gold.

New Zealand has competed in every games, starting with the British Empire Games in 1930 at Hamilton, Ontario.

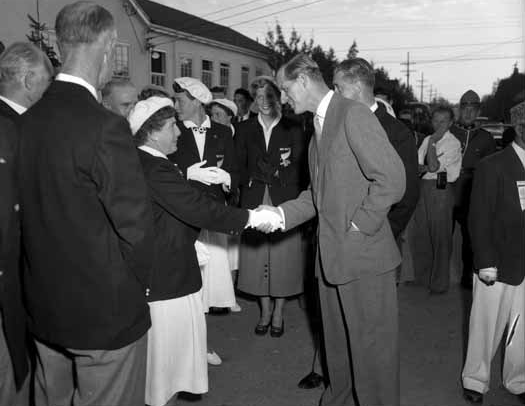
Prince Philip meets the New Zealand team Attribution:Province newspaper

== Medal tables ==
New Zealand was fifth in the medal table in 1954, with a total of 19 medals, including seven gold.

Medal	Name	Sport	Event
Gold	Don Jowett	Athletics	Men's 220 yards
Gold	Yvette Williams	Athletics	Women's discus throw
Gold	Yvette Williams	Athletics	Women's long jump
Gold	Yvette Williams	Athletics	Women's shot put
Gold	Don Rowlands	Rowing	Men's single sculls
Gold	Reg Douglas; Bob Parker	Rowing	Men's coxless pair
Gold	Jack Doms	Swimming	Men's 220 yards breaststroke
Silver	Don Jowett	Athletics	Men's 440 yards
Silver	John Baird	Cycling	Men's road race
Silver	James Pirret	Lawn bowls	Men's singles
Silver	Kerry Ashby; Murray Ashby; Stanley Callagher (cox); Bruce Culpan; Bill Tinnock	Rowing	Men's coxed four
Silver	Reg Douglas; Bob Parker	Rowing	Men's double sculls
Silver	Lincoln Hurring	Swimming	Men's 110 yards backstroke
Silver	Jack Doms; Lincoln Hurring; Buddy Lucas	Swimming	Men's 3 x 110 yards medley relay
Bronze	Jack Stewart	Diving	Men's 3 m springboard
Bronze	Jean Stewart	Swimming	Women's 110 yards backstroke
Bronze	Tony George	Weightlifting	Men's light heavyweight
Bronze	Harold Cleghorn	Weightlifting	Men's heavyweight
Bronze	John Armitt	Wrestling	Men's featherweight

Medals by sport
Sport	Gold medal	Silver medal	Bronze medal	Total
Athletics	4	1	0	5
Rowing	2	2	0	4
Swimming	1	2	1	4
Cycling	0	1	0	1
Lawn bowls	0	1	0	1
Weightlifting	0	0	2	2
Diving	0	0	1	1
Wrestling	0	0	1	1
Total	7	7	5	19

Medals by gender
Gender	Gold medal	Silver medal	Bronze medal	Total
Male	4	7	4	15
Female	3	0	1	4
Total	7	7	5	19

== Competitors ==
The following table lists the number of New Zealand competitors participating at the Games according to gender and sport.

Sport	Men	Women	Total
Athletics	11	3	14
Boxing	4	—N/a	4
Cycling	5	—N/a	5
Diving	1	1	2
Fencing	3	1	4
Lawn bowls	7	—N/a	7
Rowing	8	—N/a	8
Swimming	3	3	6
Weightlifting	3	—N/a	3
Wrestling	2	—N/a	2
Total	47	8	55

== Athletics ==
=== Track ===
Athlete	Event	Heat		Semifinal		Final	
Athlete	Event	Result	Rank (Note: Ranks given are within the heat)	Result	Rank (Note: Ranks given are within the semifinal)	Result	Rank
Bill Baillie	Men's 880 yards	1:52.3	2 Q	—N/a		1:52.5	4
Bill Baillie	Men's 1 mile	4:11.4	1 Q	—N/a		4:13.2	7
Jim Daly	Men's 1 mile	DNF		did not advance			
Jim Daly	Men's 3 miles	—N/a				14:41.0	14
Dave Fleming	Men's 440 yards	49.8	3	did not advance			
Dave Fleming	Men's 440 yards hurdles	53.8	3 Q	—N/a		53.9	4
Murray Halberg	Men's 1 mile	4:07.4 GR	1 Q	—N/a		4:07.2	5
Ernie Haskell	Men's 3 miles	—N/a				14:07.0	9
Ernie Haskell	Men's 6 miles	—N/a				31:41.0	11
Don Jowett	Men's 220 yards	21.8	1 Q	21.9	1 Q	21.5	1st place, gold medalist(s)
Don Jowett	Men's 440 yards	48.4	1 Q	48.9	2 Q	47.4	2nd place, silver medalist(s)
Lawrence King	Men's 3 miles	—N/a				14:03.4	8
Lawrence King	Men's 6 miles	—N/a				31:01.9	9
Noelene Swinton	Women's 100 yards	11.5	8	—N/a		did not advance	
Yvette Williams	Women's 80 m hurdles	11.3	2 Q	—N/a		11.5	6

=== Field ===
Athlete	Event	Qualifying		Final	
Athlete	Event	Result	Rank	Result	Rank
June Blackburn	Women's long jump	—N/a		16 ft 0 1/2 in (4.89 m)	13
Max Carr	Men's hammer throw	152 ft 7 in (46.51 m)	8 Q	157 ft 0 in (47.85 m)	8
Murray Jeffries	Men's high jump	—N/a		6 ft 2 in (1.88 m)	9
Merv Richards	Men's pole vault	—N/a		13 ft 0 in (3.96 m)	5
Noelene Swinton	Women's high jump	—N/a		5 ft 1 in (1.55 m)	=5
Peter Wells	Men's high jump	—N/a		6 ft 5 in (1.96 m)	4
Yvette Williams	Women's discus throw	—N/a		147 ft 8 in (45.01 m)	1st place, gold medalist(s)
Yvette Williams	Women's long jump	—N/a		19 ft 11 1/2 in (6.08 m) GR	1st place, gold medalist(s)
Yvette Williams	Women's shot put	—N/a		45 ft 9 1/2 in (13.96 m) GR	1st place, gold medalist(s)

== Boxing ==
Athlete	Event	Quarter Final	Semi Final	Final / BM	Rank
Athlete	Event	Opposition Result	Opposition Result	Opposition Result	Rank
Eddie Stockley	Bantamweight	Bye	Smillie (SCO); L	Did not advance	4
Alan Scaife	Light welterweight	—N/a	Harris (SRH); L	Did not advance	4
Mike Hannah	Welterweight	Gargano (ENG); L	did not advance		
Maurice Tuck	Light middleweight	Bye	Wells (ENG); L	Did not advance	4

== Cycling ==
=== Road ===
Men's road race

Athlete	Time	Rank
John Baird		2nd place, silver medalist(s)
Les Lock		unplaced
Lance Payne		unplaced
Neil Ritchie		unplaced

=== Track ===
Men's 1000 m sprint

Athlete	Round 1	Repechage	Round 2	Quarterfinals	Semifinals	Final / BM	
Athlete	Opposition Result	Opposition Result	Opposition Result	Opposition Result	Opposition Result	Opposition Result	Rank
Colin Dickinson	Ploog (AUS); Millman (CAN); 2	Harrison (ENG); Mallick (PAK); W 12.3	Brotherton (ENG); W 12.4	Cox (AUS); L, L	did not advance		
Les Lock	Shardelow (SAF); L	Davies (CAN); Farooqi (PAK); 2	Ploog (AUS); L	did not advance			

Men's 1 km time trial

Athlete	Time	Rank
Colin Dickinson	1:13.2	6
Les Lock	1:16.1	16
Neil Ritchie	1:15.3	12

Men's 4000 m individual pursuit

Athlete	Qualification		Quarterfinals	Semifinals	Final / BM	Rank
Athlete	Time	Rank	Opponent Result	Opponent Result	Opponent Result	Rank
Neil Ritchie	5:21.4	6	Brotherton (ENG); L	did not advance		

Men's 10 miles scratch race

Athlete	Time	Rank
Colin Dickinson		unplaced
Les Lock		5
Neil Ritchie		unplaced

== Diving ==
Athlete	Event	Points	Rank
Jeanette Laws	Women's 3 m springboard	104.26	5
Jeanette Laws	Women's 10 m platform	61.34	4
Jack Stewart	Men's 3 m springboard	144.98	3rd place, bronze medalist(s)

== Fencing ==
=== Men ===
Individual epee

Athlete	Elimination pool								Final pool								Rank
Athlete	Opposition Result	Opposition Result	Opposition Result	Opposition Result	Opposition Result	Opposition Result	Opposition Result	Wins	Opposition Result	Opposition Result	Opposition Result	Opposition Result	Opposition Result	Opposition Result	Opposition Result	Wins	Rank
Austen Gittos	Lund (AUS)	Schwende (CAN)	Reynolds (WAL)	Asselin (CAN)	Jay (ENG)	Barber (SAF)	—N/a	2	did not advance								
Brian Hampton	Brooke (CAN)	Paul (ENG)	Harding-Smith (AUS)	Stafford (NZL)	Fethers (AUS)	Malherbe (SAF)	de Beaumont (ENG)	3	did not advance								
Walter Stafford	Brooke (CAN)	Paul (ENG)	Harding-Smith (AUS)	Hampton (NZL)	Fethers (AUS)	Malherbe (SAF)	de Beaumont (ENG)	5	Lund (AUS)	Paul (ENG)	Schwende (CAN)	Reynolds (WAL)	Brooke (CAN)	Harding-Smith (AUS)	Asselin (CAN)	1	8

Individual foil

Athlete	Elimination pool								Final pool								Rank
Athlete	Opposition Result	Opposition Result	Opposition Result	Opposition Result	Opposition Result	Opposition Result	Opposition Result	Wins	Opposition Result	Opposition Result	Opposition Result	Opposition Result	Opposition Result	Opposition Result	Opposition Result	Wins	Rank
Austen Gittos	Howard (CAN); W	Barber (SAF); W	Cooperman (ENG); L	Paul (ENG); W	Fethers (AUS); W	Hampton (NZL); W	—N/a	5	Reynolds (WAL); L	Lund (AUS); W	Fethers (AUS); L	Jay (ENG); L	Cooperman (ENG); L	Robins (CAN); W	Paul (ENG); L	2	7
Brian Hampton	Barber (SAF); L	Fethers (AUS); L	Howard (CAN); L	Cooperman (ENG); L	Paul (ENG); L	Gittos (NZL); L	—N/a	0	did not advance								
Walter Stafford	Jay (ENG); L	Giguère (CAN); L	Steel (AUS); L	Reynolds (WAL); L	Malherbe (SAF); L	Lund (AUS); L	Robins (CAN); L	0	did not advance								

Individual sabre

Athlete	Elimination pool								Final pool								Rank
Athlete	Opposition Result	Opposition Result	Opposition Result	Opposition Result	Opposition Result	Opposition Result	Opposition Result	Wins	Opposition Result	Opposition Result	Opposition Result	Opposition Result	Opposition Result	Opposition Result	Opposition Result	Wins	Rank
Austen Gittos	Lund (AUS); L	Krasa (CAN); L	Amberg (ENG); L	Brooke (CAN); L	Hampton (NZL); W	Reynolds (WAL); L	Malherbe (SAF); L	1	did not advance								
Brian Hampton	Malherbe (SAF); L	Lund (AUS); L	Krasa (CAN); L	Amberg (ENG); L	Gittos (NZL); L	Brooke (CAN); L	Reynolds (WAL); L	0	did not advance								
Walter Stafford	Schwende (CAN); L	Fethers (AUS); L	Harding-Smith (AUS); W	Cooperman (ENG); L	Barber (SAF); L	Beatley (ENG); L	—N/a	1	did not advance								

Team epee

Athlete	Round robin				Rank
Athlete	Opposition Result	Opposition Result	Opposition Result	Wins	Rank
Austen Gittos; Brian Hampton; Walter Stafford	England; L 2 – 7	Australia; L 0 – 9	Canada; L 1 – 8	0	4

Team foil

Athlete	Round robin				Rank
Athlete	Opposition Result	Opposition Result	Opposition Result	Wins	Rank
Austen Gittos; Brian Hampton; Walter Stafford	Australia; L 2 – 7	Canada; L 3 – 6	England; L 4 – 5	0	4

Team sabre

Athlete	Round robin				Rank
Athlete	Opposition Result	Opposition Result	Opposition Result	Wins	Rank
Austen Gittos; Brian Hampton; Walter Stafford	England; L 0 – 9	Australia; L 3 – 6	Canada; L 2 – 7	0	4

=== Women ===
Individual foil

Athlete	Round robin							Rank
Athlete	Opposition Result	Opposition Result	Opposition Result	Opposition Result	Opposition Result	Opposition Result	Wins	Rank
Joyce Francis	Glen-Haig (ENG); L	Sheen (ENG)	Harding (AUS)	Gilbert (CAN)	Kimber (AUS)	Hale (CAN)	1	6

== Lawn bowls ==
Athlete	Event	Round robin													Rank
Athlete	Event	Opposition Score	Opposition Score	Opposition Score	Opposition Score	Opposition Score	Opposition Score	Opposition Score	Opposition Score	Opposition Score	W	D	L	PD	Rank
James Pirret	Men's singles	Thomas (WAL); W 21 – 19	da Luz (HKG); W 21 – 19	Bosisto (AUS); L 20 – 21	Laing (SCO); W 21 – 7	Hodges (SRH); L 17 – 21	Fairbairn (NRH); L 14 – 21	Lee (ENG); W 21 – 8	Linford (CAN); W 21 – 8	Saunders (SAF); W 21 – 8	6	0	3	+45	2nd place, silver medalist(s)
Eliphalet Ravenwood; Andrew Snaddon	Men's pairs	Northern Ireland; L 12 – 29	Hong Kong; W 29 – 14	Australia; L 16 – 21	Scotland; L 20 – 21	Southern Rhodesia; L 28 – 17	Northern Rhodesia; W 21 – 18	England; W 21 – 20	Canada; L 13 – 27	South Africa; W 25 – 22	4	0	5	−23	8
William Freeth; Arthur Webster; Arthur Connew; Pete Skoglund	Men's fours	Wales; L 18 – 24	Hong Kong; L 20 – 26	Australia; W 30 – 14	Scotland; L 14 – 26	Southern Rhodesia; L 11 – 26	Northern Rhodesia; W 26 – 20	England; D 20 – 20	Canada; W 29 – 18	South Africa; L 14 – 26	3	1	5	−18	6

== Rowing ==
Athlete	Event	Heat		Final	
Athlete	Event	Time	Rank	Time	Rank
Don Rowlands	Men's single sculls	8:52.1	1 Q	8:28.2	1st place, gold medalist(s)
Bob Parker; Reg Douglas	Men's double sculls	—N/a		8:05.2	2nd place, silver medalist(s)
Bob Parker; Reg Douglas	Men's coxless pair	—N/a		8:23.9	1st place, gold medalist(s)
Bruce Culpan; Kerry Ashby; Bill Tinnock; Murray Ashby; Stanley Callagher (cox)	Men's coxed four	8:13.9	2 Q	8:04.0	2nd place, silver medalist(s)

== Swimming ==
Athlete	Event	Heat		Final	
Athlete	Event	Result	Rank	Result	Rank
Jack Doms	Men's 220 yards breaststroke	2:54.1	2 Q	2:52.6	1st place, gold medalist(s)
Winifred Griffin	Women's 110 yards freestyle	1:12.2	12	did not advance	
Winifred Griffin	Women's 440 yards freestyle	5:39.8	9	did not progress	
Lincoln Hurring	Men's 110 yards backstroke	1:07.6	2 Q	1:06.9	2nd place, silver medalist(s)
Buddy Lucas	Men's 440 yards freestyle	4:58.3	9	did not advance	
Buddy Lucas	Men's 1650 yards freestyle	20:17.3	7	did not progress	
Marrion Roe	Women's 110 yards freestyle	1:08.7	5	1:08.9	4
Marrion Roe	Women's 440 yards freestyle	5:34.7	8	did not progress	
Jean Stewart	Women's 110 yards backstroke	1:16.9	2 Q	1:17.5	3rd place, bronze medalist(s)
Lincoln Hurring; Jack Doms; Buddy Lucas	Men's 3 x 110 yards medley relay	—N/a		3:26.6	2nd place, silver medalist(s)

== Weightlifting ==
Athlete	Event	Press	Snatch	Jerk	Total	Rank
Tony George	Light heavyweight	250 lb (113.4 kg)	230 lb (104.3 kg)	300 lb (136.1 kg)	780 lb (353.8 kg)	3rd place, bronze medalist(s)
Trevor Clark	Middle heavyweight	250 lb (113.4 kg)	240 lb (108.9 kg)	300 lb (136.1 kg)	790 lb (358.3 kg)	5
Harold Cleghorn	Heavyweight	305 lb (138.3 kg)	275 lb (124.7 kg)	350 lb (158.8 kg)	930 lb (421.8 kg)	3rd place, bronze medalist(s)

== Wrestling ==
Athlete	Event	Elimination rounds			Rank
Athlete	Event	Opposition Result	Opposition Result	Opposition Result	Rank
Ken Ruby	Bantamweight	Epton (NRH); L	Amin (PAK); L	Eliminated	
John Armitt	Featherweight	Bernard (CAN); W	Geldenhuys (SAF); L	Hall (ENG); L	3rd place, bronze medalist(s)

== Officials ==
- Team manager – Alex Ross

== See also ==
- New Zealand Olympic Committee
- New Zealand at the Commonwealth Games
- New Zealand at the 1952 Summer Olympics
- New Zealand at the 1956 Summer Olympics
