= Fencing at the 1954 British Empire and Commonwealth Games =

- Venue: Lord Byng Secondary School gymnasium
- Location: West Point Grey, Vancouver, Canada
- Dates: 30 July – 7 August 1954

Fencing at the 1954 British Empire and Commonwealth Games was the second appearance of Fencing at the Commonwealth Games. The events took place in the Lord Byng Secondary School gymnasium in West Point Grey, Vancouver.

England topped the fencing medal table with five gold medals.

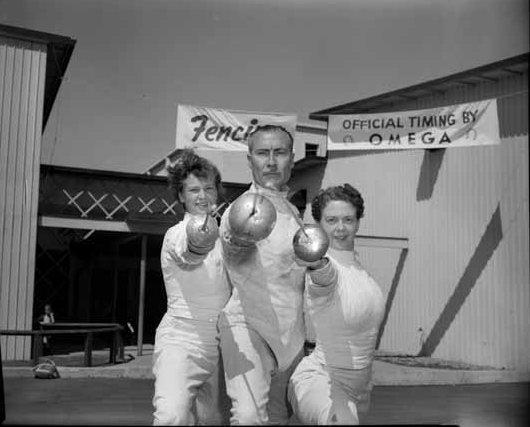
Promotional photograph, believed to be Mary Glen Haig, Charles de Beaumont and Gillian Sheen of England. Attribution:Province newspaper

== Medal table ==
* Host nation (Canada)

Medals won by nation with totals, ranked by number of golds—sortable
Rank	Nation	Gold	Silver	Bronze	Total
1	England (ENG)	5	4	1	10
2	Australia (AUS)	1	2	3	6
3	Canada (CAN)*	1	1	2	4
4	Wales (WAL)	0	0	1	1
5	New Zealand (NZL)	0	0	0	0
5	South Africa (SAF)	0	0	0	0
Totals (6 entries)		7	7	7	21

== Medal winners ==
Event	Gold	Silver	Bronze
Foil Men	René Paul (ENG)	John Fethers (AUS)	Allan Jay (ENG)
Foil – Team Men	England (ENG); René Paul; Allan Jay; Ralph Cooperman	Australia (AUS); Ivan Lund; John Fethers; Rod Steel	Canada (CAN); Carl Schwende; J.A. Howard; Roland Asselin
Épée Men	Ivan Lund (AUS)	René Paul (ENG)	Carl Schwende (CAN)
Épée – Team Men	England (ENG); René Paul; Allan Jay; Charles de Beaumont	Canada (CAN); Carl Schwende; Edward Brooke; Roland Asselin	Australia (AUS); Ivan Lund; John Fethers; Laurence Harding-Smith
Sabre Men	Mike Amberg (ENG)	Ralph Cooperman (ENG)	John Fethers (AUS)
Sabre- Team Men	Canada (CAN); Carl Schwende; Leslie Krasa; Roland Asselin	England (ENG); Michael Amberg; William Beatley; Ralph Cooperman	Australia (AUS); Ivan Lund; John Fethers; Rod Steel; Laurence Harding-Smith
Foil Women	Mary Glen-Haig (ENG)	Gillian Sheen (ENG)	Aileen Harding (WAL)

== Results ==
=== Foil (men) ===
- Final pool

Pos	Athlete	Wins/hits against
1	(England) René Paul	7 wins
2	(Australia) John Fethers	6 wins
3	(England) Allan Jay	4 wins
4	(England) Ralph Cooperman	4 wins
5	(Wales) Ossie Reynolds	2 wins
6	(Australia) Ivan Lund	2 wins
7	(New Zealand) Austen Gittos	2 wins
8	(Canada) D. R. Robins	1 wins

=== Foil (women) ===
- Final pool

Pos	Athlete	Wins/hits against
1	(England) Mary Glen-Haig	6 wins
2	(England) Gillian Sheen	5 wins
3	(Wales) Aileen Harding	3 wins
4	(Canada) Jean Gilbert	3 wins
5	(Australia) Margaret Anne Kimber	2 wins
6	(New Zealand) Joyce Francis	1 win
7	(Canada) Elizabeth Hale	1 win

=== Épée ===
- Final pool

Pos	Athlete	Wins, hits F-A
1	(Australia) Ivan Lund	6 wins
2	(England) René Paul	4 wins, 17–12
3	(Canada) Carl Schwende	4 wins, 13–12
4	(Wales) Ossie Reynolds	4 wins, 16–15
5	(Canada) Edward Brooke	4 wins, 15–15
6	(Australia) Laurence Harding-Smith	3 wins
7	(Canada) Roland Asselin	2 wins
8	(New Zealand) Walter G. Stafford	1 win

=== Sabre ===
- Final pool

Pos	Athlete	Wins
1	(England) Michael Amberg	7 wins
2	(England) Ralph Cooperman	6 wins
3	(Australia) John Erle Fethers	4 wins
4	(Canada) Carl Schwende	4 wins
5	(Canada) Leslie Krasa	3 wins
6	(Wales) Ossie Reynolds	2 wins
7	(South Africa) Andrew Malherbe	1 win
8	(England) William Beatley	1 win

=== Foil (team) ===
Team 1	Team 2	Score
England	Canada	8–1
Australia	New Zealand	7–2
England	Australia	6–3
Canada	New Zealand	6–3
England	New Zealand	5–4
Australia	Canada	7–2

Pos	Team	W	L	Pts
1	(England) Cooperman, Jay, Paul	3	0	19
2	(Australia) Fethers, Lund Steel	2	1	17
3	(Canada) Asselin, Schwende, J. A. Howard	1	2	9
4	(New Zealand) Hampton, Gittos, Stafford	0	3	9

=== Épée (team) ===
Team 1	Team 2	Score
Canada	Australia	6–3
England	New Zealand	7–2
England	Canada	6–3
Australia	New Zealand	9–0
England	Australia	5–4
Canada	New Zealand	8–1

Pos	Team	W	L	Pts
1	(England) Paul, Jay, de Beaumont	3	0	18
2	(Canada) Schwende, Asselin, Brooke	2	1	17
3	(Australia) Lund, Fethers, Harding-Smith	1	2	16
4	(New Zealand) Hampton, Gittos, Stafford	0	3	3

=== Sabre (team) ===
Team 1	Team 2	Score
Canada	Australia	6–3
England	New Zealand	9–0
Canada	England	5–4
Australia	New Zealand	6–3
England	Australia	7–2
Canada	New Zealand	7–2

Pos	Team	W	L	Pts
1	(Canada) Schwende, Krasa, Asselin	3	0	18
2	(England) Amberg, Beatley, Cooperman	2	1	20
3	(Australia) Lund, Fethers, Steel, Harding-Smith	1	2	11
4	(New Zealand) Hampton, Gittos, Stafford	0	3	5

== See also ==
- List of Commonwealth Games medallists in fencing
