= Australia at the 1954 British Empire and Commonwealth Games =

- CG code: AUS
- CGA: Australian Commonwealth Games Association
- Website: commonwealthgames.org.au

in Vancouver, British Columbia, Canada
- Competitors: 78 in 10 sports
- Flag bearers: Opening: Dick Garrard; Closing:
- Officials: 13
- Medals Ranked 2nd: Gold 20 Silver 11 Bronze 17 Total 48

British Empire and Commonwealth Games appearances
- 1930; 1934; 1938; 1950; 1954; 1958; 1962; 1966; 1970; 1974; 1978; 1982; 1986; 1990; 1994; 1998; 2002; 2006; 2010; 2014; 2018; 2022; 2026; 2030

Australia competed at the 1954 British Empire and Commonwealth Games in Vancouver, Canada from 30 July to 7 August 1954. It was Australia's fifth appearance at the Commonwealth Games, having competed at every Games since their inception in 1930.

Australia won medals in nine of the ten sports that it entered.

== Medallists ==
Medal	Name	Sport	Event
Gold	Kevan Gosper	Athletics	Men's 400 yards
Gold	David Lean	Athletics	Men's 400 yards hurdles
Gold	James Achurch	Athletics	Men's javelin
Gold	Marjorie Jackson-Nelson	Athletics	Women's 100 yards
Gold	Marjorie Jackson-Nelson	Athletics	Women's 200 yards
Gold	Gwen Wallace; Winsome Cripps; Nancy Fogarty*; Marjorie Jackson-Nelson	Athletics	Women's 4 × 110 yards relay
Gold	Dick Ploog	Cycling	Men's Time Trial
Gold	Lindsay Cocks	Cycling	Men's 10 Mile Scratch Race
Gold	Barbara McAulay	Diving	Women's 10m Platform
Gold	Ivan Lund	Fencing	Men's Épée
Gold	Mervyn Wood; Murray Riley	Rowing	Men's Double Sculls
Gold	Lionel Robberds; Dave Anderson; Peter Evatt; Geoff Williamson; Mervyn Wood	Rowing	Men's Coxed Four
Gold	Jon Henricks	Swimming	Men's 110 yards Freestyle
Gold	Gary Chapman	Swimming	Men's 440 yards Freestyle
Gold	Lorraine Crapp	Swimming	Women's 110 yards Freestyle
Gold	Lorraine Crapp	Swimming	Women's 440 yards Freestyle
Gold	David Hawkins; Gary Chapman; Jon Henricks; Rex Aubrey	Swimming	Men's 4 × 220 yards Freestyle Relay
Gold	Cyrus Weld; David Hawkins; Jon Henricks	Swimming	Men's 3 × 110 yards Medley Relay
Gold	Vern Barberis	Weightlifting	Men's Lightweight
Gold	Geoff Jameson	Wrestling	Men's Bantamweight
Silver	John Landy	Athletics	Men's 1 miles
Silver	Winsome Cripps	Athletics	Women's 100 yards
Silver	Winsome Cripps	Athletics	Women's 2200 yards
Silver	Tony Madigan	Boxing	Men's Light Heavyweight
Silver	Rodney Litzow	Boxing	Men's Welterweight
Silver	Barbara McAulay	Diving	Women's 3m Springboard
Silver	Kevin Newell	Diving	Men's 10m Platform
Silver	John Fethers	Fencing	Men's Foil
Silver	Ivan Lund; John Fethers; Rod Steel	Fencing	Men's Team Foil
Silver	Cyrus Weld	Swimming	Men's 110 yards Freestyle
Silver	Fred Flannery	Wrestling	Men's Flyweight
Bronze	Hector Hogan	Athletics	Men's 100 yards
Bronze	Brian Oliver	Athletics	Men's triple jump
Bronze	David Lean; Hector Hogan; Brian Oliver; Kevan Gosper	Athletics	Men's 4 × 110 yards relay
Bronze	Brian Oliver; Don MacMillan; David Lean; Kevan Gosper	Athletics	Men's 4 × 440 yards relay
Bronze	Warner Batchelor	Boxing	Men's Flyweight
Bronze	Brian Cahill	Boxing	Men's Lightweight
Bronze	Des Duguid	Boxing	Men's Lightweight Welter
Bronze	John Fethers	Fencing	Men's Sabre
Bronze	Ivan Lund; John Fethers; Laurence Harding-Smith	Fencing	Men's Team Épée
Bronze	Ivan Lund; John Fethers; Rod Steel; Laurence Harding-Smith	Fencing	Men's Team Sabre
Bronze	Dave Anderson; Geoff Williamson	Rowing	Men's Coxless Pair
Bronze	Rex Aubrey	Swimming	Men's 110 yards Freestyle
Bronze	Gary Chapman	Swimming	Men's 1650 yards Freestyle
Bronze	Cyrus Weld	Swimming	Men's 110 yards Backstroke
Bronze	Jann Grier; Judith Knight; Lorraine Crapp	Swimming	Women's 3 × 110 yards Medleyle Relay
Bronze	Keith Caple	Weightlifting	Men's Bantamweight
Bronze	Dick Garrard	Wrestling	Men's Lightweight

Medals by sport
Sport	1st place, gold medalist(s)	2nd place, silver medalist(s)	3rd place, bronze medalist(s)	
Athletics	6	3	4	13
Swimming	6	1	4	10
Rowing	2	0	1	3
Cycling	2	0	0	2
Fencing	1	2	3	6
Diving	1	2	0	3
Wrestling	1	1	1	3
Weightlifting	1	0	1	3
Boxing	0	2	3	5
Total	20	11	17	48

== Team management ==
Honorary General Manager and Chief of Mission - Jim Eve
Honorary Assistant General Manager - Edward Kenny
Honorary Manageress - Norah Morison Section Officials: Athletics Manager - Frank Treacy, Athletics Women's Coach - Nell Gould; Lawn Bowls Manager - Frederick Winn; Boxing, Weightlifting & Wrestling Manager - Herbert Keenan; Cycling Manager - Bill Young; Fencing Coach - Joan Beck; Rowing Manager - Roy Thursfield; Swimming Manager - William Holland

== See also ==
- Australia at the 1952 Summer Olympics
- Australia at the 1956 Summer Olympics
