= Fencing at the 1950 British Empire Games =

- Venue: Auckland City Drill Hall
- Location: Rutland Street, Auckland, New Zealand
- Dates: 4 – 11 February 1950

Fencing at the 1950 British Empire Games was the maiden appearance of Fencing at the Commonwealth Games. The events took place in the Auckland City Drill Hall on Rutland Street.

England topped the fencing medal table with six gold medals.

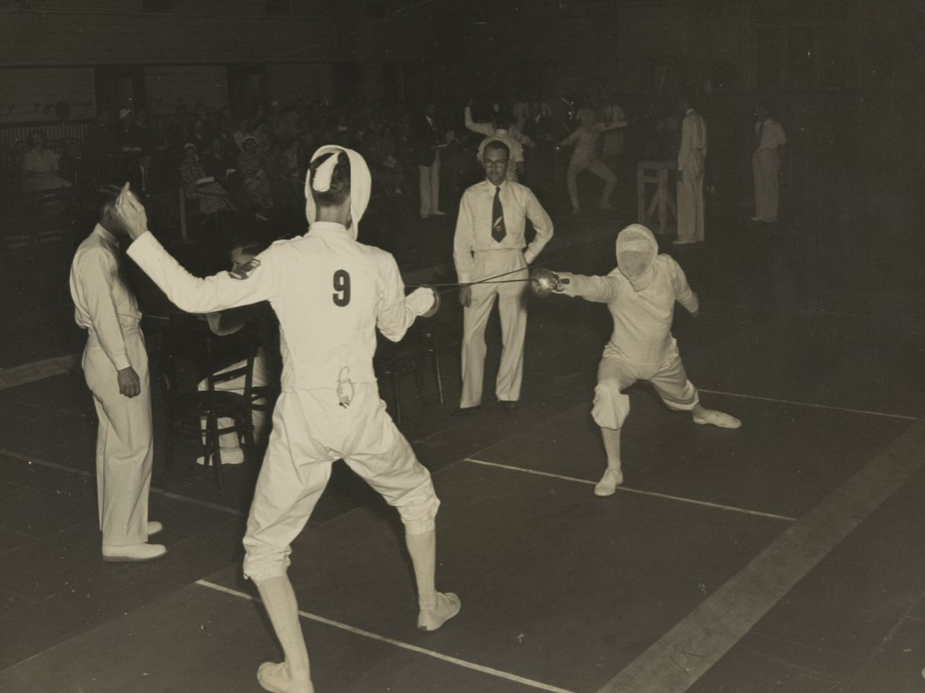
1950 British Empire Games fencing taking place at the Auckland City Drill Hall Auckland Libraries Heritage Collections

== Medal table ==
* Host nation (New Zealand)

Medals won by nation with totals, ranked by number of golds—sortable
Rank	Nation	Gold	Silver	Bronze	Total
1	England (ENG)	6	3	0	9
2	Australia (AUS)	1	1	3	5
3	New Zealand (NZL)*	0	2	0	2
4	Canada (CAN)	0	1	4	5
Totals (4 entries)		7	7	7	21

== Medal winners ==
Event	Gold	Silver	Bronze
Foil	René Paul (ENG)	John Fethers (AUS)	Georges Pouliot (CAN)
Foil team	England; Arthur Pilbrow; Robert Anderson; René Paul	New Zealand; Austen Gittos; Gordon Dearing; Murray Gittos; Malcolm Millar	Canada; Georges Pouliot; Robert Desjarlais; Edward Brooke
Épée	Charles de Beaumont (ENG)	Robert Anderson (ENG)	Ivan Lund (AUS)
Épée team	Australia; Allan Jay; Ivan Lund; Charles Stanmore	England; René Paul; Charles de Beaumont; Robert Anderson	Canada; Georges Pouliot; Robert Desjarlais; Edward Brooke
Sabre	Arthur Pilbrow (ENG)	Robert Anderson (ENG)	Georges Pouliot (CAN)
Sabre team	England; Charles de Beaumont; Arthur Pilbrow; Robert Anderson	Canada; Georges Pouliot; Robert Desjarlais; Edward Brooke	Australia; Norman Booth; Leslie Chillug; Edwin Dean; Jock Gibson
Foil	Mary Glen-Haig (ENG)	Patricia Woodroffe (NZL)	Catherine Pym (AUS)

== Results ==
=== Foil (men) ===
- Final pool

Pos	Athlete	Wins/hits against
1	(England) René Paul	7 Wins
2	(Australia) John Fethers	6 Wins
3	(Canada) Georges Pouliot	4 Wins, 22
4	(New Zealand) Austen Gittos	4 Wins, 24
5	(England) Bob Anderson	2 Wins, 31
6	(Canada) Robert Desjarlais	2 Wins, 31
7	(England) Arthur Pilbrow	2 Wins, 32
8	(New Zealand) Murray Gittos	1 Wins

=== Foil (women) ===
- Final pool

Pos	Athlete	Wins/hits against
1	(England) Mary Glen-Haig	7 Wins
2	(New Zealand) Patricia Woodroffe	6 Wins
3	(Australia) Catherine Pym	5 Wins
4	(Australia) Elizabeth Stokes	3 Wins, 20
5	(New Zealand) Olga Jekyll	3 Wins, 21
6	(New Zealand) Florence Andrews	2 Wins
7	(Canada) E. Hamilton	1 Wins, 25
8	(Australia) Mavis Joan Wilson	1 Wins, 27

=== Épée ===
- Final pool

Pos	Athlete	Wins
1	(England) Charles de Beaumont	5 Wins+
2	(England) Bob Anderson	5 Wins+
3	(Australia) Ivan Lund	5 Wins+
4	(England) René Paul	4 Wins
5	(Canada) Edward Brooke	3 Wins
6	(Australia) Allan Jay	2 Wins
7	(Canada) Robert Desjarlais	2 Wins
8	(New Zealand) Joseph Ward	2 Wins

+ First three places determined by a barrage

=== Sabre ===
- Final pool

Pos	Athlete	Wins
1	(England) Arthur Pilbrow	7 wins
2	(England) Bob Anderson	5 wins
3	(Canada) Georges Pouliot	4 wins
4	(New Zealand) Dudley E. Wright	3 wins
5	(England) René Paul	3 wins
6	(Australia) Jock Gibson	
7	(Canada) Robert Desjarlais	
8	(Canada) Edward Brooke	

=== Foil (team) ===
Team 1	Team 2	Score
England	Australia	7–2
New Zealand	Canada	6–3
England	Canada	7–2
Australia	New Zealand	5–4
England	New Zealand	6–3
Canada	Australia	7–2

Pos	Team	W	L	Pts
1	(England) Pilbrow, Anderson, Paul	3	0	20
2	(New Zealand) Dearing, A.Gittos, M.Gittos, Millar	1	2	13
3	(Canada) Pouliot, Desjarlais, Brooke	1	2	12
4	(Australia) Fethers, Jay, Dean	1	2	9

=== Épée (team) ===
Team 1	Team 2	Score
Australia	England	4–4+
Canada	New Zealand	8–0
England	New Zealand	6–3
Australia	Canada	5–4
England	Canada	9–0
Australia	New Zealand	5–4

+ Australia win tie on fewer hits against

Pos	Team	W	L	Pts
1	(Australia) Jay, Lund, Stanmore	3	0	14
2	(England) Paul, de Beaumont, Anderson	2	1	19
3	(Canada) Pouliot, Desjarlais, Brooke	1	2	12
4	(New Zealand) Cox, Elsom, J.H. Malcolm, J. Shaw, Ward	0	3	7

=== Sabre (team) ===
Team 1	Team 2	Score
Australia	New Zealand	6–3
England	Canada	8–1
Canada	New Zealand	6–3
England	Australia	7–2
England	New Zealand	8–1
Canada	Australia	6–3

Pos	Team	W	L	Pts
1	(England) de Beaumont, Pilbrow, Anderson	3	0	24
2	(Canada) Pouliot, Desjarlais, Brooke	2	1	13
3	(Australia) Booth, Chillug, Dean, Gibson	1	2	11
4	(New Zealand) Flaws, Hadley, McLeavey, Stafford, Wright	0	3	7

== See also ==
- List of Commonwealth Games medallists in fencing
