= Fencing at the 1966 British Empire and Commonwealth Games =

- Venue: Excelsior School Auditorium
- Location: Kingston, Jamaica
- Dates: 4 to 13 August 1966

Fencing at the 1966 British Empire and Commonwealth Games was the fifth appearance of Fencing at the Commonwealth Games. The fencing took place at the Excelsior School Auditorium in Kingston, Jamaica and consisted of eight events.

England made a clean sweep of all eight gold medals to top the table.

== Medal table ==
* Host nation (Jamaica)

Medals won by nation with totals, ranked by number of golds—sortable
Rank	Nation	Gold	Silver	Bronze	Total
1	England	8	3	1	12
2	Australia	0	3	2	5
3	Canada	0	1	1	2
3	Scotland	0	1	1	2
5	New Zealand	0	0	2	2
6	Wales	0	0	1	1
Totals (6 entries)		8	8	8	24

== Medal winners ==
Fencing medallists by event
Event	Gold	Silver	Bronze
Foil, Men	Allan Jay (England)	Bill Hoskyns (England)	Graham Paul (England)
Foil – Team, Men	England; Allan Jay; Graham Paul; Bill Hoskyns	Australia; Barry Wasley; Brian McCowage; John Humphreys; Russell Hobby	Scotland; George Sandor; Joseph Rorke; Robert Wilson
Épée, Men	Bill Hoskyns (England)	John Pelling (England)	Robert Reynolds (Wales)
Épée – Team, Men	England; Bill Hoskyns; John Pelling; Peter Jacobs	Canada; John Andru; Konrad Widmaier; Peter Bakonyi	Australia; Barry Wasley; John Humphreys; Peter Hardiman; Russell Hobby
Sabre, Men	Ralph Cooperman (England)	Sandy Leckie (Scotland)	Gabor Arato (Australia)
Sabre- Team, Men	England; Ralph Cooperman; Richard Oldcorn; John Rayden	Australia; Brian McCowage; Gabor Arato; Laszlo Tornallyay	Canada; John Andru; Leslie Samek; Robert Foxcroft
Foil, Women	Janet Wardell-Yerburgh (England)	Shirley Parker (England)	Gaye McDermit (New Zealand)
Foil – Team, Women	England; Janet Wardell-Yerburgh; Joyce Pearce; Shirley Parker	Australia; Jeanette Beauchamp; Melody Coleman; Walburga Winter	New Zealand; Joyce Fenton; Gaye McDermit; Pamela French

== Results ==
=== Foil (men) ===
- Final pool

Pos	Athlete	Wins
1	(England) Allan Jay	5 wins
2	(England) Bill Hoskyns	4
3	(England) Graham Paul	4
4	(Australia) Russell Hobby	4
5	(New Zealand) Brian Pickworth	4
6	(New Zealand) Michael Henderson	3
7	(Australia) Brian McCowage	2
8	(Scotland) George Sandor	2

=== Épée (men) ===
- Final pool

Pos	Athlete	Wins
1	(England) Bill Hoskyns	5 wins
2	(England) John Pelling	5
3	(Wales) Robert Reynolds	4
4	(Canada) Peter Bakonyi	4
5	(Australia) John Humphreys	4
6	(England) Peter Jacobs	3
7	(Scotland) George Sandor	2
8	(Canada) Konrad Widmaier	0

=== Sabre (men) ===
- Final pool

Pos	Athlete	Wins
1	(England) Ralph Cooperman	7 wins
2	(Scotland) Sandy Leckie	5
3	(Australia) Gabor Arato	4
4	(Canada) John Andru	3
5	(New Zealand) Brian Pickworth	3
6	(New Zealand) Bob Binning	3
7	(England) John Rayden	2
8	(Jamaica) Raymond E. Jackson	1

=== Foil (team) ===
Semi finals

Team 1	Team 2	Score
England	Scotland	5–0
Australia	New Zealand	5–0

Bronze play off

Team 1	Team 2	Score
Scotland	New Zealand	5–1

Final

Team 1	Team 2	Score
England	Australia	5–1

=== Épée (team) ===
Semi finals

Team 1	Team 2	Score
England	Scotland	5–2
Canada	Australia	5–1

Bronze play off

Team 1	Team 2	Score
Australia	Scotland	5–3

Final

Team 1	Team 2	Score
England	Canada	5–0

=== Sabre (team) ===
Semi finals

Team 1	Team 2	Score
England	Canada	5–4
Australia	New Zealand	5–3

Bronze play off

Team 1	Team 2	Score
Canada	New Zealand	5–3

Final

Team 1	Team 2	Score
England	Australia	5–2

=== Foil (women) ===
- Final pool

Pos	Athlete	Wins
1	(England) Janet Wardell-Yerburgh	6, won by barrage
2	(England) Shirley Parker	6
3	(New Zealand) Gaye McDermit	4
4	(Australia) Jeanette Beauchamp	4
5	(Australia) Dot Coleman	3
6	(Wales) Julia Davis	3
7	(Wales) Angela Julian	2
8	(England) Joyce Pearce	0

=== Foil (women team) ===
Bronze play off

Team 1	Team 2	Score
New Zealand	Wales	5–2

Final

Team 1	Team 2	Score
England	Australia	5–0

== See also ==
- List of Commonwealth Games medallists in fencing
