= BAF =

BAF or Baf may refer to:

== Biology ==
- Barrier-to-autointegration factor, a family of proteins
- BRG1, or hbrm-associated factors, a family of proteins; see SWI/SNF re BAF complex

== Military ==
- Bagram Airfield
- Balkan Air Force, a late-World War II Allied air formation
- Bangladesh Air Force
- Belgian Air Force, previous name of the Belgian Air Component, ICAO code
- Benefield Anechoic Facility, installed systems for avionics test programs
- Belarusian Air Force
- Bolivian Air Force
- Bophuthatswana Air Force, the aviation branch of the military forces of Bophuthatswana
- British Armed Forces, the military of the United Kingdom of Great Britain and Northern Ireland
- Bulgarian Air Force

== Other uses ==
- Baca language (ISO 639:b), a Southern Bantoid language of Cameroon
- .baf, a proprietary data format used by Bruker mass spectrometers
- Baptistina family, an asteroid family
- Barnes Municipal Airport, IATA airport code
- Basal area factor, used in forestry to calculate tree cover over land
- Belarus Athletic Federation
- Berliner Animation Film, former film and TV production company (1999–2015)
- Bio aviation fuel, another term for aviation biofuel
- Brigade d'autodéfense du français (BAF), an activist grouping in Quebec in defense of French language
- British Academy of Fencing
- British Air Ferries, a former airline
- Building a Future, an organization concerned with child poverty in Latin America
- Bunker adjustment factor, sea freight charges which represents additions due to oil prices
- The Turkish name for Paphos, Cyprus
