= Athletics at the 1954 British Empire and Commonwealth Games – Women's 4 × 110 yards relay =

Women's 4 × 110 yards relay at the Commonwealth Games
- Venue: Empire Stadium
- Dates: 7 August

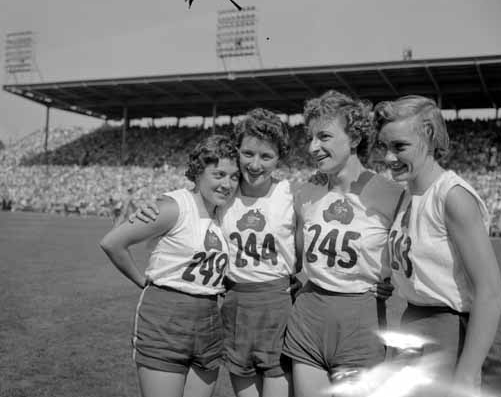
Winners Australia, Gwen Wallace 249, Nancy Fogarty 244, Marjorie Jackson-Nelson 245 and Winsome Cripps 243. Attribution:Province newspaper

The women's 4 × 110 yards relay event at the 1954 British Empire and Commonwealth Games was held on 7 August at the Empire Stadium in Vancouver, Canada. It was the first time that this event was contested replacing the medley relay.

== Results ==
Rank	Nation	Athletes	Time	Notes
1st place, gold medalist(s)	Australia	Gwen Wallace, Winsome Cripps, Nancy Fogarty, Marjorie Jackson	46.8	GR
2nd place, silver medalist(s)	England	Anne Pashley, Heather Armitage, Shirley Burgess, Shirley Hampton	46.9	
3rd place, bronze medalist(s)	Canada	Margery Squires, Dorothy Kozak, Annabelle Murray, Geraldine Bemister	47.8	
