= Surcharge =

A surcharge may refer to:

- An extra fee added onto another fee or charge
  - Bunker adjustment factor, sea freight charges which represents additions due to oil prices
  - Surcharge (payment systems), charged by merchants when receiving payment by cheque, credit, charge or debit card
- An overprint that affects the value of a postage stamp
- A surcharge (sanction) against a public servant who has abused public funds
- Surtax, extra tax levied upon tax
- Surcharge (soil load), vertical loads applied to the ground surface on the uphill side of a retaining wall
- Surcharge, or hydraulic head
