= Murray Jeffries =

New Zealand high jumper and police officer (born 1937)

Personal information
- Born: 1 August 1937 (age 89) Auckland, New Zealand
- Occupations: Schoolteacher; police officer
- Spouse: Barbara Anne Armstrong (m. 1959; died 1995)
- Children: 3

Sport
- Country: New Zealand
- Sport: Track and field

Achievements and titles
- National finals: High jump champion (1961, 1962, 1964, 1966)

Murray Jeffries (born 1 August 1937) is a former New Zealand field athlete and police officer. He represented his country in the high jump at the 1954 British Empire and Commonwealth Games, and was the national high jump champion on four occasions between 1961 and 1966. A police detective, Jeffries was involved in high-profile investigations including the murder of Harvey and Jeannette Crewe and the murder of Teresa Cormack.

== Early life and family ==
Jeffries was born in Auckland on 1 August 1937, the son of Florence and Harry Jeffries. He was educated at Otahuhu College, and went on to study at Ardmore Teachers' College from 1956 to 1957, earning a Primary School Teaching Certificate.

In 1959, Jeffries married Barbara Anne Armstrong, and the couple had three children. Barbara Jeffries died in 1995.

== Athletics ==
In 1954, Jeffries set a junior national record of 6 feet 5 inches (1.96 m) in the high jump. He was a member of the New Zealand team at the 1954 British Empire and Commonwealth Games, where he finished ninth in the high jump with a height of 6 feet 2 inches (1.88 m).

Jeffries won four New Zealand junior national titles in 1955, in the high jump, javelin throw, shot put and discus throw, and that year broke the national junior record for the high jump, with a leap of 6 feet 5 5/8 inches (1.97 m), and the javelin throw, recording a distance of 192 feet 6 inches (58.67 m). The following year, he competed in Australia with the New Zealand Universities track and field team. He was nominated for the New Zealand team for the 1956 Summer Olympics in Melbourne by the New Zealand Amateur Athletic Association, but he was not selected by the New Zealand Olympic and British Empire Games Association.

Jeffries won four national high jump titles: in 1961, 1962, 1964 (title shared with Bill Speirs), and 1966. His best winning jump was in 1966, with a height of 6 ft 6 in (1.98 m).

== Police career ==
After a short period as a primary school teacher, Jeffries joined the New Zealand Police, and at the passing out for his intake at the Trentham Police Training School in December 1959 he won the prize for sportsmanship. He went on to become a detective at the Otahuhu Criminal Investigation Branch, and he was officer in charge of the scene following the 1970 murders of Jeannette and Harvey Crewe at their Pukekawa farm.

Jeffries later moved to Hawke's Bay, where he was involved in investigations including the disappearance of Kirsa Jensen and the murder of Teresa Cormack. He was also involved in the establishment of neighbourhood support and rural support groups in Hawke's Bay, and the victim support group in Napier.

In 1979, Jeffries received the New Zealand Police Long Service and Good Conduct Medal, and in 1990 he was awarded the New Zealand 1990 Commemoration Medal.
