= Trevor Clark =

Trevor Clark may refer to:

- Trevor Clark (cricketer) (1908–1992), New Zealand cricketer
- Trevor Clark (weightlifter) (1916–1984), New Zealand weightlifter
- Trevor Clark (rugby league)
