= McDermit =

McDermit may refer to:

- Gaye McDermit, New Zealand fencer
- Fort McDermit, American fort in Nevada
