= Elizabeth Hale =

Elizabeth Hale may refer to:

- Elizabeth Amherst Hale (1774–1826), Canadian watercolour artist
- Lzzy Hale (1983–), American rock musician
- Elizabeth Hale (fencer) (1918–2011), Canadian fencer
