= Pilbrow =

Pilbrow is a surname. Notable people with the surname include:

- Arthur Pilbrow (1902–1987), British fencer
- Ashleigh Pilbrow (1912–1995), British track and field athlete
- Richard Pilbrow (1933–2023), British stage lighting designer
