= Athletics at the 1954 British Empire and Commonwealth Games – Women's 100 yards =

Women's 100 yards at the Commonwealth Games
- Venue: Empire Stadium
- Dates: 1 August

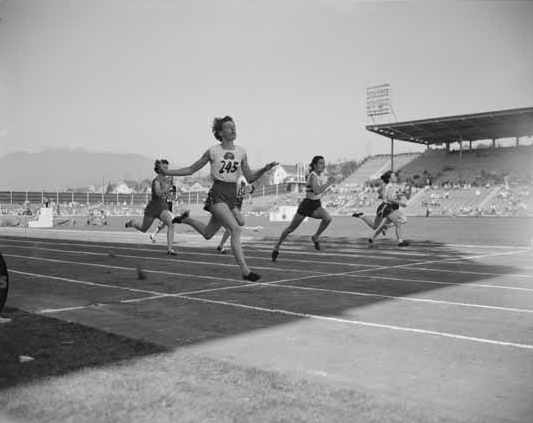
Women's 100 yards race at the games. Attribution:Province newspaper

The women's 100 yards event at the 1954 British Empire and Commonwealth Games was held on 1 August at the Empire Stadium in Vancouver, Canada.

== Medalists ==
Gold	Silver	Bronze
Marjorie Jackson-Nelson; Australia	Winsome Cripps; Australia	Edna Maskell; Northern Rhodesia

== Results ==
=== Heats ===
Qualification: First 3 in each heat (Q) qualified directly for the final.

Rank	Heat	Name	Nationality	Time	Notes
1	1	Marjorie Jackson-Nelson	Australia	10.9	Q
2	1	Anne Pashley	England	10.9	Q
3	1	Geraldine Bemister	Canada	11.0	Q
4	1	Shirley Burgess	England	11.1	
5	1	Patricia Devine	Scotland	11.1	
6	1	Nancy Fogarty	Australia	11.2	
7	1	Dorothy Kozak	Canada	11.2	
8	1	Noelene Swinton	New Zealand	11.5	
1	2	Winsome Cripps	Australia	10.9	Q
2	2	Edna Maskell	Northern Rhodesia	11.0	Q
3	2	Heather Armitage	England	11.1	Q
4	2	Shirley Hampton	England	11.2	
5	2	Thelma Jones	Bermuda	11.3	
6	2	Annabelle Murray	Canada	11.4	
7	2	Margery Squires	Canada	11.5	
	?	Marlene Mathews-Willard	Australia	DNF	

=== Final ===
Rank	Name	Nationality	Time	Notes
1st place, gold medalist(s)	Marjorie Jackson-Nelson	Australia	10.7w	
2nd place, silver medalist(s)	Winsome Cripps	Australia	10.8w	
3rd place, bronze medalist(s)	Edna Maskell	Northern Rhodesia	10.8w	
4	Anne Pashley	England	10.9w	
5	Geraldine Bemister	Canada	10.9w	
6	Heather Armitage	England	11.0w	
