= Max Carr =

New Zealand discus and hammer thrower

Max Carr OBE
Personal information
- Full name: John Maxwell Carr
- Born: 14 June 1922 Christchurch, New Zealand
- Died: 5 July 2016 (aged 94) Tauranga, New Zealand
- Military career
- Allegiance: New Zealand
- Branch: New Zealand Army; Royal New Zealand Air Force
- Service years: 1941–43; 1943–46, 1948–72
- Rank: Wing Commander
- Conflicts: World War II

Sport
- Country: New Zealand
- Sport: Track and field

Achievements and titles
- National finals: Long jump champion (1945); Hammer throw champion (1947, 1949, 1954, 1959, 1963)
Medal record
Men's Masters athletics
Representing New Zealand
World Masters Athletics Championships
Gold medal – first place	1993 Miyazaki	M70 Hammer
Gold medal – first place	1995 Buffalo	M70 Hammer
Gold medal – first place	1997 Durban	M75 Hammer

John Maxwell Carr OBE (14 June 1922 – 5 July 2016) was a New Zealand field athlete and coach, athletics official, and air force officer. He represented his country at the 1950 and 1954 British Empire and Commonwealth Games, and served as a wing commander in the Royal New Zealand Air Force. In later years, he won three World Masters hammer throw titles.

== Early life and family ==
Carr was born in Christchurch on 14 June 1922. He married his wife, Norma Joy, in about 1949, and they had one daughter.

== Military service ==
During World War II, Carr served as a second lieutenant in the New Zealand Army from November 1941 until June 1943. He then joined the Royal New Zealand Air Force (RNZAF), flying two tours of operation with No. 16 Squadron in the Pacific, and was promoted from pilot officer to flying officer in September 1944. He left the RNZAF in January 1946, but rejoined in December 1948. He was promoted to the rank of wing commander in 1961, and was appointed as director of works for the RNZAF, responsible for the planning and administration of works construction and maintenance programmes. Carr retired from the RNZAF in 1972.

In the 1966 New Year Honours, Carr was appointed an Office of the Military Division of the Order of the British Empire.

== Athletics ==
=== National competition ===
Carr joined the Technical Amateur Athletic and Cross-Country Club in Christchurch in the 1930s. He first came to national attention in 1940, when he won the national under-19 long jump title with a leap of 21 ft 4 in (6.50 m). He went on to win the national senior men's long jump title at the 1945 national athletics championships, with a distance of 22 ft 1 1/2 in (6.74 m). At the same meeting, he finished second in the triple jump and hammer throw, and third in the discus. It was as a hammer thrower that Carr would ultimately gain greatest success, winning the national title on five occasions: in 1947, 19149, 1954, 1959, and 1963. His best winning throw was 167 ft 5 1/2 in (51.04 m) in 1963. In 21 consecutive New Zealand national championship hammer competitions, Carr never finished outside the top three: recording 13 second and three third placings, as well as his five title wins. In 1963, the Wellington Athletic Centre named Carr as its sportsman of the year, and awarded him the Allen Cup for outstanding feats as a competitor.

Carr set a national record for the hammer throw on three occasions.

=== International competition ===
At the 1950 British Empire Games in Auckland, Carr represented New Zealand in both the discus and hammer throws. In the former event, he finished in eighth place with a best throw of 126 ft 8 3/4 in (38.63 m), and he came sixth in the latter event, recording a best distance of 140 ft 6 3/4 in (42.84 m).

Four years later, at the 1954 British Empire and Commonwealth Games in Vancouver, Carr was New Zealand's flagbearer at the opening ceremony. His best throw of 157 ft 0 in (47.85 m) in the men's hammer throw saw him finish in eighth place in that event.

=== Masters athletics ===
Carr went on to be active in Masters athletics. He won numerous age-group titles in the hammer, discus and shot put at New Zealand Masters championships in the 1980s and 1990s, and he won three world Masters hammer throw gold medals: in the M70 category in 1993 and 1995; and the M75 age group in 1997.

=== Administration and coaching ===
At the 1964 Summer Olympics in Tokyo, Carr was a New Zealand's athletic section manager, and for many years he served as an amateur athletics official in Auckland, verifying the specification of throwing equipment. He received a merit award from Athletics New Zealand in 1991.

Carr was also involved in coaching, and, with Les Mills, trained Beatrice Faumuina during the early stages of her career.

== Death ==
Carr died in Tauranga on 5 July 2016.
