= June Blackburn =

New Zealand long jumper

June Chamberlain
Personal information
- Born: Betty June Blackburn; 29 June 1933 (age 92)
- Died: 13 July 2005 (aged 72)
- Spouse(s): 1. Thomas Richard Manhire; 2. Wallace Ronald Chamberlain

Sport
- Country: New Zealand
- Sport: Track and field

Betty June Chamberlain (formerly Manhire, née Blackburn; 29 June 1933 – 13 July 2005) was a New Zealand long jumper who represented her country at the 1954 British Empire and Commonwealth Games.

Born on 29 June 1933, Blackburn represented New Zealand alongside Yvette Williams in the women's long jump at the 1954 British Empire and Commonwealth Games in Vancouver. She finished in 13th place, recording a best leap of 16 ft 0 1/2 in (4.89 m).

She was married twice: firstly to Thomas Richard Manhire until their divorce in 1973; and then to Wallace Ronald Chamberlain. She died on 13 July 2005.
