= Dawson-Williams Memorial Prize =

British prize for work in pediatrics

The Dawson-Williams Memorial Prize was a fund was established by the British Medical Association (BMA), through a voluntary subscription among the friends and admirer of the late Sir Dawson Williams. It was created for the purpose of recognizing the work and contributions done in the field of pediatrics.

The memorial fund is awarded every two years, and the first award was given to Dr.F.J. Poynton in 1930, for his work on children suffering from rheumatic disease.

== Notable Recipients ==
Years	Name	Rationale	Notes
1930	Frederic John Poynton	"for founding the Heard Homes for convalescent rheumatic children"	
1934	Sir George Frederic Still	"Recognized for his foundational work in pediatrics and founding homes for convalescent children"	
1959	Dr. Wilfrid Payne	"for biochemical and pediatric advancements"	
1978	Dr. Douglas Gairdner	"for his work and editing of the Archives of Disease in Childhood"	
1984/1985	Dr. Otto Herbert Wolff	"for distinguished contributions to pediatric metabolic and clinical medicine"	
1992	Dr. Edward Osmund Royle Reynolds	"for pioneering work neonatology and perinatal medicine"	
1998	Professor Richard Worthington Smithells	"for research into the prevention of neural tube defects via folic acid"	
2002	Dr. David Morley	"for contributions to tropical pediatrics and the "Child to Child" program"	
