= 1950 Maccabiah Games =

International Jewish multi-sport event

3rd Maccabiah
- Logo of the 3rd Maccabiah
- Host city: Tel Aviv, Israel
- Nations: 20
- Debuting countries: Argentina; Australia; Canada; Finland; India; Ireland; Sweden
- Athletes: 800
- Opening: September 27, 1950
- Closing: October 8, 1950
- Main venue: Ramat Gan Stadium

Summer

Winter

The 3rd Maccabiah (Hebrew: המכביה השלישית) took place during Sukkot from September 27 to October 8, 1950, with 17 countries competing. It was the third edition of the Maccabiah Games and the first held since the independence of the State of Israel; 15 years after the previous Maccabiah. Israel won the 1950 Maccabiah Games, Great Britain was second, South Africa third, the United States fourth, Canada fifth, and Austria sixth.

== History ==
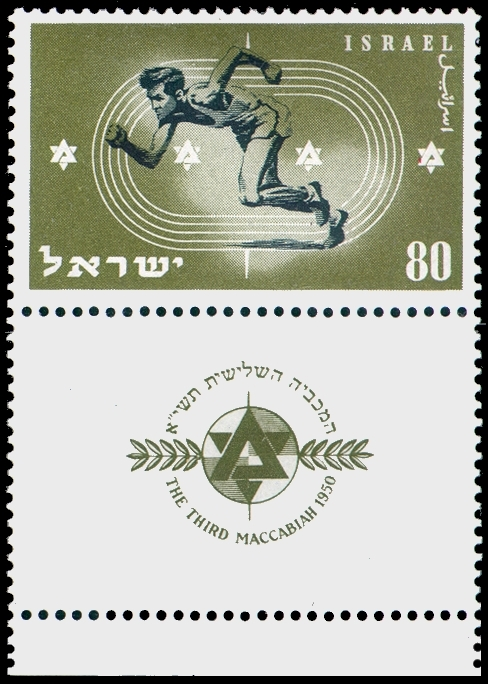
Israeli postal stamp, 1950

The 3rd Maccabiah was originally scheduled to take place three years after the 2nd Maccabiah in Spring of 1935. Preparations began; posters were created; and distinguished guests such as the Chief Rabbi of Romanian Jewry, Jacob Itzhak Niemirower came to Eretz Yisrael. However, for a number of reasons, such as the British Authorities' refusal to approve the games (due to illegal immigration concerns) and the Arab revolt, the games were postponed indefinitely. The Maccabiah was further delayed due to World War II and the 1947–1949 Palestine war.

The final date for the third Maccabiah was decided upon at the Third World Congress of Maccabi in December 1948, during the war. At the same meeting it was also agreed that games will not be held on Saturdays and holidays.

The 16-day Games opened at a new stadium in Ramat Gan, with the ceremony attended by a crowd of 30,000, and athletes parading before Acting President Yosef Sprinzak and other dignitaries.

== Notable competitors ==
Gold medals were earned by Americans Henry Wittenberg (an Olympic light heavyweight champion) in heavyweight freestyle wrestling, and Frank Spellman (who two years earlier had won a gold medal at the Olympics) in weightlifting. Former world champion Fred Oberlander of Canada won the silver medal in heavyweight wrestling, unable to compete in the finals due to illness. León Genuth of Argentina, who competed in the Olympics two years later, won the middleweight wrestling gold medal. Max Ordman of South Africa, a future Olympian, won the light heavyweight wrestling gold medal.

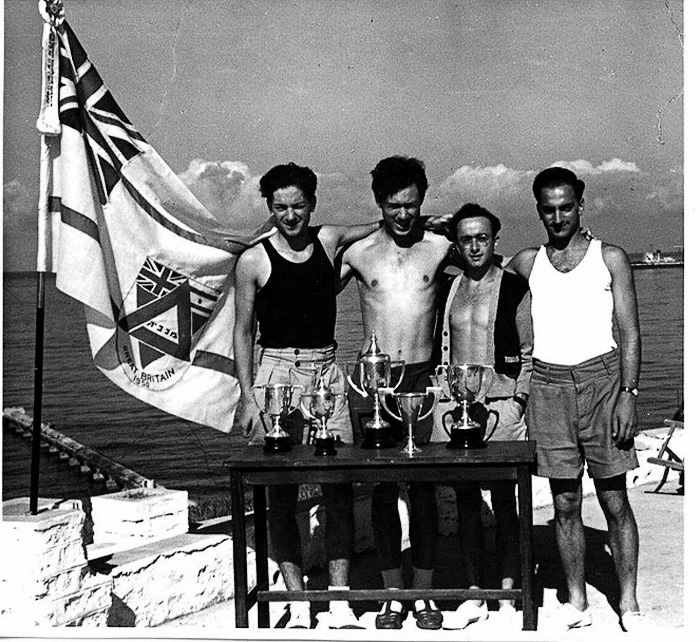
Team Great Britain members showing their trophies at the Games.

Olympian Henry Laskau (national champion and world record holder) won a gold medal for the U.S. in racewalking at 3,000 m, as former Olympian Irving Mondschein coached the U.S. track and field team. In swimming, Olympian Zsuzsa Nádor representing Great Britain (whereas she had represented Hungary at the Olympics) won gold medals in the 100 m back, the 100 m crawl, and the 400 m freestyle.

In fencing, Great Britain's Allan Jay, future Olympic silver medalist, won the epee gold medal. Three-time Pan American Games gold medalists Allan Kwartler (in sabre) and Daniel Bukantz (foil) won medals in fencing, with Bukantz defeating Kwartler for the foil championship in a score of 5-4. Ralph Cooperman was a medalist for Great Britain in fencing. Kwartler won the gold medal in sabre. Canada earned 14 medals in its first Games.

Ben Helfgott, a concentration camp survivor and later an Olympian, won the weightlifting gold medal in the lightweight class for Great Britain.

U.S. table tennis champion, and world championships bronze medalist, Reba Monness competed. American Olympian Alex Treves also competed in fencing.

== Participating nations ==
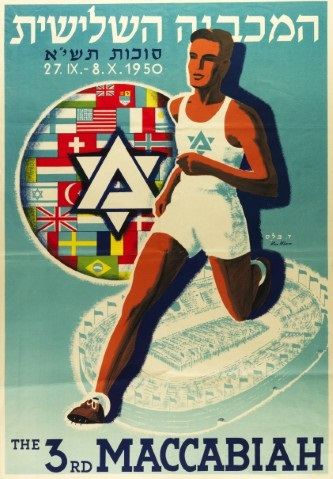

Israel won the 1950 Maccabiah Games, Great Britain was second, South Africa third, the United States fourth, Canada fifth, and Austria sixth. Seventeen countries competed. Eight countries entered the competition for the first time, among them Argentina, Canada, India and Sweden. The number in parentheses indicates the number of participants that country contributed:

- Argentina
- Austria
- Australia
- Belgium
- Canada
- Czechoslovakia (1)
- Denmark
- Finland
- France
- West Germany
- India
- Ireland
- Israel (240)
- Libya
- Netherlands
- South Africa (54)
- Sweden
- Switzerland
- Turkey
- United Kingdom (94)
- United States (43)
