= British Academy of Fencing =

- Formation: 1949
- Founder: Charles de Beaumont
- Type: Membership organisation
- Legal status: Limited company
- Members: 220
- Website: www.baf-fencing.com

The British Academy of Fencing (BAF) is a membership organisation for those involved in coaching and coach education in the sport of fencing in the United Kingdom. The Academy claims to trace its roots to the reign of Henry VII and the Company of Masters of the Science of Defence, and was established in 1949.

The Academy provides a comprehensive programme of support and teaching for coaches, and maintains a structured set of qualifications in the tuition of the three weapons used in competitive fencing, including basic, intermediate, advanced and diploma awards. As qualifications are attained, members are entitled to use a range of titles such as Provost, Maître d’Escrime, and Master. In addition, full masters of all three weapons adopt the title Professor.

While the title 'academy' implies that the organisation is based in a dedicated training school or other facility, the organisation is an association, and its members practice and train throughout the United Kingdom and abroad.

== Events ==
The Academy organise regular residential courses to prepare coaches and prospective coaches for formal examinations.

== Publications ==
The Academy publishes a newsletter called Academy News, as well as a range of guidance and training manuals for members.

== Notable members ==
- Charles de Beaumont – British Olympic fencer.
- Roger Crosnier – founder; technical adviser and coach to the British Olympic Team in 1948, and to the French Olympic team in 1952; author of the National Training Method of classical fencing; author of several books on the subject of fencing.
- Allan Jay, British (épée & foil), Olympic 2x silver, world champion
- Leon Paul – founder; Olympian.
- J.D. Aylward – founder; sword-collector and historian of the sword.
- Leon Bertrand
- Bob Anderson – British Olympic fencer and film fight choreographer.
- Leon (Leonard) Hill, MBE – long-serving Chair of the Standing Sub-Committee on Technique and Training, and former National Coach. In the New Year's Honours 2012, Professor Hill was awarded an MBE for his services to fencing. He had been the editor of the Academy's syllabus and training materials since the early 1970s.
- Edgar Seligman, British (épée, foil, and saber), Olympic 2x silver (épée), 2x British champion in each weapon

== Administration and governance ==
The British Academy of Fencing is governed by a committee. On 22 May 2013, The British Academy of Fencing was incorporated as a Company Limited by Guarantee, with exemption of use of the word "Limited".

== Affiliations ==
The Academy has relationships with a number of international fencing organisations, including:

- Académie d'Armes Internationale (AAI)
- UK Coaching (former Sports Coach UK)
- The British Fencing Association
