= Zsuzsa Nádor =

Hungarian swimmer (1927–2015)

Personal information
- Nationality: Hungarian; British (from 1950)
- Born: 19 September 1927 Budapest, Austria-Hungary
- Died: 14 April 2015 (aged 87)
- Spouse: Roman Halter

Sport
- Sport: Swimming

Zsuzsa Nádor (19 September 1927 – 14 April 2015) was a Hungarian (later nationalised British) swimmer and Holocaust survivor. She competed in the women's 100 metre freestyle at the 1948 Summer Olympics.

At the 1950 Maccabiah Games, representing Great Britain, she won gold medals in the 100 m back, the 100 m crawl, and the 400 m freestyle. At the 1953 Maccabiah Games, again representing Great Britain, she won the silver medal in the 400 m crawl, behind future Olympian Shoshana Ribner of Israel.

As a Jew, she was not allowed to swim during the occupation of Hungary by Nazi Germany, and in 1944 was subjected to a forced march near the Danube in Austria, from which she escaped. She subsequently returned to Budapest and worked in a factory, then moved to London to live with an aunt and uncle.

She settled in England, acquiring British citizenship in 1950, and married the artist and architect Roman Halter the same year, thereafter using the name Susan Halter. She worked as a swimming teacher, then took up masters swimming in her sixties.

She died on 14 April 2015. A memorial bench in the couple's honour was installed at Crouch End Lido, where they used to swim, in the presence of the Mayor of Haringey, Sheila Peacock, Catherine West, MP, in 2020.
