= Stanley Callagher =

New Zealand rower

Personal information
- Full name: Stanley Herbert Michael Callagher
- Born: 18 April 1927
- Died: 21 April 2011 (aged 84) Takapuna, New Zealand
- Spouse: Noeleen Evelyn Ryan (died 1997)
Medal record
Men's rowing
Representing New Zealand
British Empire Games
Silver medal – second place	1954 Vancouver	Coxed Four

Stanley Herbert Michael Callagher (18 April 1927 – 21 April 2011) was a New Zealand rowing coxswain who won a silver medal at the 1954 British Empire and Commonwealth Games.

== Early life and family ==
Born on 18 April 1927, Callagher was the son of Harold Stanislaus Callagher and Bridget Callagher (née Fee). He married Noeleen Evelyn Ryan, and the couple went on to have four children.

== Rowing ==
Callagher represented New Zealand at the 1954 British Empire and Commonwealth Games in Vancouver, where he coxed the men's four, which consisted of Bruce Culpan, Kerry Ashby, Bill Tinnock and Murray Ashby. The crew won the silver medal, finishing 2.1 seconds behind the Australian boat.

== Later life and death ==
Callagher died in Takapuna on 21 April 2011, having been predeceased by his wife, Noeleen, in 1997. His ashes were buried at Mangere Lawn Cemetery.
