= Fencing at the Commonwealth Games =

Fencing was featured in the Commonwealth Games official programme from 1950 to 1970.

Since 1970, as the Commonwealth Games Federation recognised sport, the Commonwealth Fencing Championships have been held every four years, in the same year as the Commonwealth Games.

== Editions ==
Games	Year	Host city	Host country	Best nation
IV	1950	Auckland	New Zealand	England
V	1954	Vancouver, British Columbia	Canada	England
VI	1958	Cardiff	Wales	England
VII	1962	Perth, Western Australia	Australia	England
VIII	1966	Kingston	Jamaica	England
IX	1970	Edinburgh	Scotland	England

== Events ==
Event	50	54	58	62	66	70	Years
Men's Foil, Individual	•	•	•	•	•	•	6
Men's Foil, Team	•	•	•	•	•	•	6
Women's Foil, Individual	•	•	•	•	•	•	6
Women's Foil, Team					•	•	2
Épée, Individual	•	•	•	•	•	•	25
Épée, Team	•	•	•	•	•	•	6
Sabre, Individual	•	•	•	•	•	•	26
Sabre, Team	•	•	•	•	•	•	23
Total Events	6	6	6	6	7	7	

== All-time medal table ==
Rank	Nation	Gold	Silver	Bronze	Total
1	England	37	16	11	64
2	Australia	3	15	11	29
3	Scotland	2	4	2	8
4	Canada	1	7	13	21
5	New Zealand	1	2	3	6
6	Wales	0	0	4	4
Totals (6 entries)		44	44	44	132

== See also ==
List of Commonwealth Games medallists in fencing
