= Roman Halter =

Roman Halter (7 July 1927 in Chodecz – 30 January 2012) was a Polish painter, sculptor, writer, architect and Holocaust survivor. He managed to escape from a cart while on a transport to Chełmno extermination camp. His mother, sister and her family were murdered in Chełmno. After the war he moved to Britain and became an architect, establishing practices in London and Cambridge.

In 1950, he married the Olympic swimmer Zsuzsa Nádor. A memorial bench in the couple's honour was installed at Crouch End Lido, where they used to swim, in the presence of the Mayor of Haringey, Sheila Peacock, Catherine West, MP, in 2020.

In 2007 he published a biographical book, Roman's Journey.
