= Jeanette Laws =

New Zealand diver

Jeanette Barker
Personal information
- Born: Jeanette Mary Laws; 1933 or 1934 (age 92–93)
- Spouse: Peter Stanley Barker

Sport
- Country: New Zealand
- Sport: Diving

Achievements and titles
- National finals: Diving champion (1951, 1953, 1954, 1955, 1956); Tower diving champion (1954, 1955)

Jeanette Mary Barker (née Laws, born 1933 or 1934) is a New Zealand diver who represented her country at the 1954 British Empire and Commonwealth Games. In more recent years she has competed in international masters swimming and diving championships.

== Early life and diving career ==
Born Jeanette Mary Laws, Barker was born in about 1933, and educated at Napier Girls' High School. She started diving when she was at intermediate school, and competed in both swimming and diving until she was 15 years old, when she decided to concentrate on the latter. After she left school, Laws spent two years living in Auckland and Dunedin where she received specialist diving coaching, while working in accounting.

Representing Hawke's Bay, Laws went on to win the New Zealand national women's diving championship five times—in 1951 and then in four consecutive years from 1953 to 1956—as well as the national women's tower diving title in 1954 and 1955. At the 1954 British Empire and Commonwealth Games in Vancouver, Laws finished fifth in the women's 3 m springboard, and fourth in the women's 10 m platform diving events.

== Later life ==
Later in the 1950s, Laws retired from diving to marry Peter Barker and raise a family. She ran her own swimming school for eight years, and returned to competitive swimming and diving in the 1980s, competing at six FINA World Masters Championships.

FINA World Masters Championships results for Jeanette Barker
Year	Meet	Location	Age group	Event	Rank
1986	1st FINA World Masters Championships	Tokyo	50–54 years	Women's 50 m freestyle	13
1986	1st FINA World Masters Championships	Tokyo	50–54 years	Women's 400 m freestyle	18
1986	1st FINA World Masters Championships	Tokyo	50–54 years	Women's 50 m breaststroke	13
1986	1st FINA World Masters Championships	Tokyo	50–54 years	Women's 100 m breaststroke	9
1986	1st FINA World Masters Championships	Tokyo	50–54 years	Women's 200 m breaststroke	8
1988	2nd FINA World Masters Championships	Brisbane	50–54 years	Women's 50 m breaststroke	21
1988	2nd FINA World Masters Championships	Brisbane	50–54 years	Women's 100 m breaststroke	17
1988	2nd FINA World Masters Championships	Brisbane	50–59 years	Women's 1 m springboard	4
1988	2nd FINA World Masters Championships	Brisbane	50–59 years	Women's 3 m springboard	3rd place, bronze medalist(s)
1988	2nd FINA World Masters Championships	Brisbane	50–59 years	Women's platform	3rd place, bronze medalist(s)
1990	3rd FINA World Masters Championships	Rio de Janeiro	55–59 years	Women's 50 m breaststroke	21
1990	3rd FINA World Masters Championships	Rio de Janeiro	55–59 years	Women's 100 m breaststroke	6
1990	3rd FINA World Masters Championships	Rio de Janeiro	55–59 years	Women's 200 m breaststroke	7
1990	3rd FINA World Masters Championships	Rio de Janeiro	55–59 years	Women's 1 m springboard	2nd place, silver medalist(s)
1990	3rd FINA World Masters Championships	Rio de Janeiro	55–59 years	Women's 3 m springboard	1st place, gold medalist(s)
1990	3rd FINA World Masters Championships	Rio de Janeiro	50–59 years	Women's platform	1st place, gold medalist(s)
1998	7th FINA World Masters Championships	Casablanca	65–69 years	Women's 50 m breaststroke	6
1998	7th FINA World Masters Championships	Casablanca	65–69 years	Women's 100 m breaststroke	6
1998	7th FINA World Masters Championships	Casablanca	65–69 years	Women's 1 m springboard	3rd place, bronze medalist(s)
1998	7th FINA World Masters Championships	Casablanca	65–69 years	Women's 3 m springboard	3rd place, bronze medalist(s)
1998	7th FINA World Masters Championships	Casablanca	65–69 years	Women's platform	2nd place, silver medalist(s)
2002	9th FINA World Masters Championships	Christchurch	65–69 years	Women's 100 m freestyle	23
2002	9th FINA World Masters Championships	Christchurch	65–69 years	Women's 200 m freestyle	11
2002	9th FINA World Masters Championships	Christchurch	65–69 years	Women's 50 m breaststroke	12
2002	9th FINA World Masters Championships	Christchurch	65–69 years	Women's 100 m breaststroke	11
2002	9th FINA World Masters Championships	Christchurch	65–69 years	Women's 200 m breaststroke	8
2002	9th FINA World Masters Championships	Christchurch	65–69 years	Women's 1 m springboard	1st place, gold medalist(s)
2002	9th FINA World Masters Championships	Christchurch	65–69 years	Women's 3 m springboard	1st place, gold medalist(s)
2004	10th FINA World Masters Championships	Riccione	70–74 years	Women's 100 m freestyle	10
2004	10th FINA World Masters Championships	Riccione	70–74 years	Women's 50 m breaststroke	12
2004	10th FINA World Masters Championships	Riccione	70–74 years	Women's 200 m breaststroke	6
2004	10th FINA World Masters Championships	Riccione	70–74 years	Women's 1 m springboard	4
2004	10th FINA World Masters Championships	Riccione	70–74 years	Women's 3 m springboard	2nd place, silver medalist(s)
2004	10th FINA World Masters Championships	Riccione	70–74 years	Women's tower	3rd place, bronze medalist(s)
