= Trevor Clark (weightlifter) =

New Zealand weightlifter (1916–1984)

Personal information
- Born: Trevor Rees Clark; 9 November 1916 Auckland, New Zealand
- Died: 5 April 1984 (aged 67) Auckland, New Zealand

Sport
- Country: New Zealand
- Sport: Weightlifting

Achievements and titles
- National finals: Middleweight champion (1939); Light heavyweight champion (1947, 1948, 1949, 1950); Middle heavyweight champion (1951, 1952, 1953)

Trevor Rees Clark (9 November 1916 – 5 April 1984) was a New Zealand weightlifter who represented his country at the 1950 British Empire Games and 1954 British Empire and Commonwealth Games.

Clark won eight New Zealand national weightlifting titles: four in the light heavyweight division, in consecutive years from 1947 to 1950; three in the middle heavyweight division, in 1951, 1952, and 1953; and the middleweight division in 1939. He represented New Zealand in the light heavyweight division of the weightlifting at the 1950 British Empire Games in Auckland, where he finished in fourth place, recording a total of 730 lb (331.1 kg). At the 1954 British Empire and Commonwealth Games in Vancouver, he moved up a weight class, to the middle heavyweight division, and finished fifth, with a combined total of 790 lb (358.3 kg).

During World War II, Clark served as a private in the 2nd New Zealand Expeditionary Force, and was taken prisoner of war in Crete in 1941. He was held in Stalag VIII-B, later renumbered Stalag-344.

Clark was the manager of the New Zealand weightlifting team at the 1964 Summer Olympics in Tokyo.

Clark died on 5 April 1984, and was cremated at Purewa Crematorium.
