= Richard Oldcorn =

British fencer (1938–2022)

Personal information
- Nationality: British (English)
- Born: 21 February 1938 Iver, Buckinghamshire, England
- Died: 1 June 2022 (aged 84) Abbotsford, Australia
- Height: 198 cm (6 ft 6 in)
- Weight: 92 kg (203 lb)

Sport
- Sport: Fencing
- Event: Sabre
- Club: Liverpool YMCA
Medal record
Fencing
Representing England
British Empire & Commonwealth Games
Gold medal – first place	1966 Kingston	team sabre

Richard Oldcorn (21 February 1938 – 1 June 2022) was a British international fencer. He competed at the 1964, 1968 and 1972 Summer Olympics.

== Biography ==
Oldcorn was a member of the Liverpool YMCA Fencing Club.

Oldcorn represented the England team at the 1966 British Empire and Commonwealth Games in Kingston, Jamaica. He won a gold medal in the team sabre with Ralph Cooperman and John Rayden.

He was last selected to fence for Great Britain at the world championships in Buenos Aires in 1977, although injury prevented his taking part. Thereafter he became team manager, first of the national sabre team then for the entire British fencing team, managing them at the Moscow Olympics in 1980. Although he never won the national sabre championship (his best placing was second) from 1968 till the early 1970s he was the most successful British sabreur in international competition.
