= Nancy Fogarty =

Australian sprinter

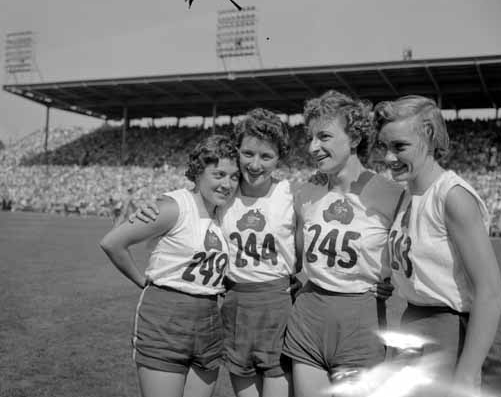
- 1954 gold medal winners Australia, Gwen Wallace 249, Nancy Fogarty 244, Marjorie Jackson-Nelson 245 and Winsome Cripps 243. Attribution:Province newspaper

Personal information
- Nationality: Australian
- Born: Nancy Anne Fogarty; 17 May 1934 (age 92) New South Wales, Australia

Sport
- Sport: Track and field
Medal record
Representing Australia
British Empire and Commonwealth Games
Gold medal – first place	1954 Vancouver	4 × 110 yards relay

Nancy Anne Atterton (née Fogarty; born 17 May 1934) is a former Australian sprinter. During the 1954 British Empire and Commonwealth Games in Vancouver, she won a gold medal in the 4 × 110 yards relay, and also competed in the 100 yards and 220 yards events.

Fogarty was born in New South Wales. After retiring from competing, she became involved in coaching sprinters such as Miles Murphy and Josh Clarke.
