= Robert Wilson (fencer) =

Scottish fencer

Personal information
- Nationality: British (Scottish)
- Born: Scotland

Sport
- Sport: Fencing
- Event(s): Foil, Épée, Sabre
- Club: Glasgow Fencing Club
Medal record
Fencing
Representing Scotland
British Empire & Commonwealth Games
Bronze medal – third place	1966 Kingston	team foil

Robert G. Wilson is a former international fencer from Scotland who competed at the Commonwealth Games.

== Biography ==
Wilson was a member of the Glasgow Fencing Club.

Wilson represented the Scotland team at the 1966 British Empire and Commonwealth Games in Kingston, Jamaica, where he participated in the four events. He subsequently won a bronze medal in the team foil with George Sandor and Joseph Rorke.

In 1967 he represented Scotland in the home nations tournament and was the 1968 champion of Scotland in the foil.
