= Bob Anderson (fencer) =

English actor and fencer (1922–2012)

Personal information
- Born: 15 September 1922 Gosport, Hampshire, England
- Died: 1 January 2012 (aged 89) West Sussex, England
- Occupation(s): Fencer, cinematic fight choreographer
Medal record
Fencing
Representing England
British Empire Games
Gold medal – first place	1950 Auckland	Sabre team
Gold medal – first place	1950 Auckland	Foil team
Silver medal – second place	1950 Auckland	Épée team
Silver medal – second place	1950 Auckland	Épée individual
Silver medal – second place	1950 Auckland	Sabre individual

Robert James Gilbert Anderson (15 September 1922 – 1 January 2012) was an English Olympic fencer and a renowned film fight choreographer, with a cinema career that spanned more than 50 years and included films such as Highlander, The Three Musketeers, Barry Lyndon, The Princess Bride, The Mask of Zorro, the Star Wars film series, The Lord of the Rings film series, the James Bond film series and the Pirates of the Caribbean film series. He was regarded as the premier choreographer of Hollywood sword-fighting, and during his career he coached many actors in swordsmanship, including Errol Flynn, Sean Connery, Antonio Banderas, Mark Hamill, Viggo Mortensen, Adrian Paul, and Johnny Depp. He also appeared as a stunt double for Darth Vader's lightsaber battles in The Empire Strikes Back and Return of the Jedi.

== Biography ==
Anderson was educated at The Royal Hospital School, in Raleigh House. It was here that he began to fence. Anderson joined the Royal Marines and won several combined services titles in the sport of fencing. He served in the Mediterranean during the Second World War.

As a competitive fencer, he represented Great Britain at the Helsinki 1952 Summer Olympic Games, and the World Championships in 1950 and 1953 in the sabre event. He finished tied for fifth in the team sabre event at Helsinki in 1952.

After his retirement from fencing competition, he studied under Prof. Roger Crosnier and was appointed the first official British National Coach, in charge of the National Training System, the day he was awarded his full Professorship. He succeeded Prof. Crosnier as President of the British Academy of Fencing. During the late 1950s to the 1970s he travelled around Britain, and between fencing courses, he combined his official duties with television and film work. Eventually emigrating to Canada, he went on to become technical director of the Canadian Fencing Association in Ottawa. During the 1960s and 1970s he was also the president of the British Academy of Fencing.

Anderson's cinema career began in 1952, when he fought Errol Flynn in the 1953 film The Master of Ballantrae. Patrick Crean staged the fights and coached Flynn, and stated that he called up every fencer he knew to fill out the final battle, which is how Anderson got the job. During rehearsal for a scene he accidentally slashed Flynn on his thigh, leading to notoriety in Hollywood as "the man who stabbed Errol Flynn". He went on to work as a stunt performer and/or fight choreographer in films such as The Guns of Navarone and the Bond films From Russia With Love and Casino Royale. His stature in Hollywood was cemented when he was selected by Stanley Kubrick in 1974 to act as the sword master for Barry Lyndon.

Anderson subsequently went on to be involved in all three of the original Star Wars films. Anderson did not receive much recognition for his work for years after their initial release. Mark Hamill in 1983 revealed, "Bob Anderson was the man who actually did Vader's fighting. It was always supposed to be a secret, but I finally told George I didn't think it was fair any more. Bob worked so bloody hard that he deserves some recognition. It's ridiculous to preserve the myth that it's all done by one man." Anderson in 1994 specified that for The Empire Strikes Back and Return of the Jedi he staged the lightsaber duels and also wore the Vader costume in fight scenes. David Prowse, who played Vader, said he did his own swordplay in the first Star Wars film but afterward, "having one of the principals do his own stunts made [the filmmakers] very weird from an insurance point of view."

Anderson continued to work in cinema for the next 30 years, and was responsible for the swordsmanship in many films, including Highlander, The Princess Bride, The Three Musketeers, The Mask of Zorro, Pirates of the Caribbean: The Curse of the Black Pearl and The Lord of the Rings film trilogy. Shortly before his death, he was working on The Hobbit. He had a reputation for being a perfectionist, with director Martin Campbell giving him the nickname "Grumpy Bob". Anderson was interviewed at length for the 2009 documentary on cinematic sword-fighting, Reclaiming the Blade, where he commented, "I never took up the sword, I think the sword took me up."

== Death ==
Anderson died on New Year's Day, 2012, in a West Sussex hospital at the age of 89.

After his death, his widow, Pearl, and daughter, Simone, visited the Royal Hospital School and donated Anderson's swords, medals and movie footage to a museum.

== Filmography ==
=== Miscellaneous crew ===
- Alatriste (2006): Sword Master
- The Legend of Zorro (2005): Sword Master
- The Lord of the Rings: The Return of the King (2003): Sword Master
- Pirates of the Caribbean: The Curse of the Black Pearl (2003): Sword Master, Additional Sword Training
- The Lord of the Rings: The Two Towers (2002): Sword Master
- Die Another Day (2002): Sword Master
- The Lord of the Rings: The Fellowship of the Ring (2001): Sword Master
- The Parent Trap (1998): Fencing Consultant
- The Mask of Zorro (1998): Sword Master
- The Phantom (1996): Sword Master
- First Knight (1995): Sword Master
- The Three Musketeers (1993): Sword Master
- Highlander:The Series (1992–1994): Sword Master
- By the Sword (1991): Sword Master
- The Princess Bride (1987): Sword Master
- Highlander (1986): Sword Master
- Star Wars (1977): Fight Arranger (uncredited)
- Barry Lyndon (1975): Fencing Coach
- Kidnapped (1971): Fight Arranger
- Don't Lose Your Head (1966): Fight Arranger (uncredited)
- The Moonraker (1958) Fencing Coach

=== Stunts ===
- Return of the Jedi (1983): Stunt Double for Darth Vader
- Superman II (1980): Stunts (uncredited)
- The Empire Strikes Back (1980): Stunt Double for Darth Vader
- Candleshoe (1977): Stunt Arranger
- Star Wars (1977): Stunts/Stunt Double (uncredited)
- One of Our Dinosaurs is Missing (1975): Stunt Arranger
- Kidnapped (1971): Fight Arranger
- Casino Royale (1967): Stunts (uncredited)
- From Russia with Love (1963): Stunts (uncredited)
- The Guns of Navarone (1961): Stunts (uncredited)
- Il maestro di Don Giovanni (1954): Stunts
- The Master of Ballantrae (1953): Stunts (uncredited)

=== Actor ===
- Reclaiming the Blade (2009): himself
- The Three Musketeers (1993) (Uncredited)
- The Empire Strikes Back (1980): Trey Callum, Rebel Officer on Hoth (Uncredited)
- Candleshoe (1977): Hood (Uncredited)
- Doctor Who (1968): Fighting Guard in the serial The Enemy of the World

== Notes ==
- Wallechinsky, David (1984). "Fencing: Sabre, Team". In The complete Book of the Olympics: 1896 - 1980. New York: Penguin Books. p. 264.
