= Building a Future =

US-based nonprofit organization

- Founded: 2007 by Robert Furr, Jordan Baucum, David Hollon, Jose Mahomar, and Evan Loomis in Plano, Texas
- Type: Nonprofit, Interest group
- Location: United States (headquarters)
- Services: Media attention, educational assistance, community support center construction
- Fields: Improving the lives of impoverished children in Latin America
- Key people: Robert Furr; Jordan Baucum; David Hollon; Jose Mahomar
- Website: buildingafuture.org

Building a Future (BAF) is an international, philanthropic nonprofit organization dedicated to improving the lives of impoverished children in Latin America. BAFFUSAM currently operates in Tegucigalpa, Honduras.

== History ==
In December 2007, Building a Future became a 501(c)(3) nonprofit organization. BAF was started in 2004 by a group of Texas A&M University students. They were inspired to do something of social importance that would have an impact at an international level.

Jose Mahomar and Robert Furr (now BAF Directors) took a leap of faith by proposing a philanthropic idea that would seek to provide education to impoverished children in Honduras. The idea for BAF started in a class titled ‘Academy for Future International Leaders’ and then developed into an organized effort supported by Texas A&M University and is currently in process of forming a partnership with the Borlaug Institute. Jose and Robert decided to keep pursuing their vision and some of their closest friends at TAMU joined in.

== Programs ==
=== Texaco Family Support Center ===
Since January 2006, Building A Future (BAF) has served a community of over 500 children with the construction the Texaco Family Support Center. This was BAF's first project initiative and its success has confirmed the desire to create a bigger impact in other communities in Honduras.

In June 2008, BAF secured another additional donation from Chevron Texaco to provide educational material, such as a computer, a projector, and a photocopier, to the center.

=== Junior Master Gardener Program ===
In February 2009, BAF in partnership with the Borlaug Institute at Texas A&M University hosted the Junior Master Gardener Program. The program included curriculum with a special focus on agriculture.

=== 1,000 Children are in Need Campaign ===
In July 2009, BAF began a campaign to keep eight family support centers in Tegucigalpa, Honduras from closing due to a lack of funding. As a result of the political turmoil, the centers did not receive subsidies that they depend on to remain operational. To prevent these centers from closing or reducing operations, BAF sought to raise at least US$12,000 to fill the gap.
