= John Rayden =

English fencer

Personal information
- Nationality: British (English)
- Born: Fourth quarter 1938 Watford, England

Sport
- Sport: Fencing
- Event: Sabre
- Club: London Fencing Club
Medal record
Fencing
Representing England
British Empire & Commonwealth Games
Gold medal – first place	1966 Kingston	sabre team

William "John" Rayden (born 1938), is a male former fencer who competed for England.

== Biography ==
Rayden was a member of the London Fencing Club.

Rayden represented England at the 1966 British Empire and Commonwealth Games in Kingston, Jamaica. He participated in the sabre events and won a gold medal in the team sabre with Ralph Cooperman and Richard Oldcorn.
