= Julia Davis (fencer) =

British fencer

Personal information
- Born: 25 February 1941 (age 85) Cardiff, Wales

Sport
- Sport: Fencing

Julia Davis (born 25 February 1941) is a British fencer. She competed in the women's team foil event at the 1968 Summer Olympics.
