= Murder of Teresa Cormack =

1987 New Zealand murder victim

Teresa Maida Cormack
- Teresa Cormack
- Born: Teresa Maida Cormack; 18 June 1981; Napier, New Zealand
- Died: 19 June 1987 (aged 6); Napier, New Zealand

Teresa Maida Cormack (18 June 1981 – 19 June 1987) was a six-year-old murder victim from Napier, New Zealand. After fifteen years, advances in genetic analysis led to the conviction of Jules Mikus (28 September 1958 – 6 December 2019) for the crime. He had been identified as a potential suspect early in the investigation, but had offered an alibi that was accepted at the time.

== Murder ==
Cormack lived in Napier, New Zealand, with her mother, Kelly Piggot, and her younger sister Sara. On Friday, 19 June 1987, the day after her sixth birthday, Cormack departed home on her normal walking route to Richmond Primary School, a short distance from home. She was reported missing to the police that evening after she failed to return home. It was later discovered that she had not arrived at school that morning.

On the morning of Saturday 27 June 1987, Cormack's body was discovered at the base of a tree on Whirinaki Beach by a woman walking her dog. An autopsy revealed that she had been raped and suffocated.

== Investigation ==
Three male pubic hairs were found orally and in her underwear, and semen was found vaginally on Cormack's body. However, genetic fingerprinting at the time was not advanced enough to find her killer.

Jules Mikus, born 28 September 1958, drew interest from police due to his record of sex offenses that began when he was a teenager. Mikus was asked to provide blood and saliva samples and was later photographed at his home. It was decided at the time that he was not an eligible suspect due to an alibi he'd provided for the assumed time of her disappearance.

== Breakthrough ==
The Cormack murder case was re-opened in 1998 and new testing was done at a crime lab in the United States. Due to advances in genetic fingerprinting, a minute sample of semen stored sealed between two microscope slides was profiled in 2001 by technicians at Environmental Science & Research, a Crown Research Institute.

Despite having this profile, no arrest was immediate. A public television broadcast by the detective in charge was seen by Mikus and provoked a reaction in front of people with whom he lived, but they did not contact police. Eight-hundred and forty-five blood samples had been taken, of these, four weren't of sufficient quality to make a profile. After nearly a year of testing the blood (taking until 22 February 2002), only one blood profile matched the semen and it came from Mikus.

On 26 February 2002, fifteen years after Cormack's death, police charged Mikus for the murder. Although Mikus pleaded not guilty, a jury found him guilty of kidnapping, rape, sexual assault, and murder. He was sentenced to life imprisonment for murder, preventative detention for rape, and 14 years each for the sexual assault and abduction, all served concurrently, with a minimum non-parole period of 10 years. Mikus died in prison on 9 December 2019 at age 62.

== Aftermath ==
The case attracted widespread interest in New Zealand.

In 2004, Rowene Marsh-Potaka (who had campaigned to prevent her brother's parole) collaborated with Cormack's mother Kelly Piggot to write an anti-parole song. They wanted the song to let people know that offenders such as Mikus should serve their full sentences.

Paul Rothwell's play Golden Boys, which ran at Circa Theatre in early 2006, was inspired by the Cormack case.

== See also ==
- Lists of solved missing person cases
