= George Sandor =

Scottish fencer (born c.1944)

Personal information
- Nationality: British (Scottish)
- Born: c.1944 Scotland

Sport
- Sport: Fencing
- Events: Foil, Épée
- Club: Edinburgh University Fencing Club
Medal record
Fencing
Representing Scotland
British Empire & Commonwealth Games
Bronze medal – third place	1966 Kingston	foil team
Silver medal – second place	1970 Edinburgh	épée team

George G. Sandor (born c. 1944) is a former international fencer from Scotland who won medals at two Commonwealth Games.

== Biography ==
Sandor attended Henry Smith Grammar School in Hartlepool and studied medicine at the University of Edinburgh and was a member of their Fencing Club. He was a Scottish and British Universities champion.

Sandor represented the Scotland team at the 1966 British Empire and Commonwealth Games in Kingston, Jamaica, where he participated in the three events. He subsequently won a bronze medal in the team foil with Joseph Rorke and Robert Wilson.

He attended a second Commonwealth Games at the 1970 British Commonwealth Games in Edinburgh and won a silver medal in the team épée event, with Derek Russell and Ian Hunter.
