= Shirley Netherway =

British fencer (1937–2016)

Personal information
- Nationality: British (English)
- Born: 19 May 1937 Buckhurst, Essex, England
- Died: 6 March 2016 (aged 78)
- Height: 170 cm (5 ft 7 in)
- Weight: 60 kg (132 lb)

Sport
- Sport: Fencing
- Event: foil
- Club: Polytechnic Fencing Club
Medal record
Fencing
Representing England
British Empire & Commonwealth Games
Gold medal – first place	1966 Kingston	team foil
Silver medal – second place	1966 Kingston	individual foil

Shirley Netherway married name Shirley Parker (19 May 1937 – 6 March 2016) was a British fencer.

== Biography ==
She competed at the 1960 and 1964 Summer Olympics.

After she married in 1965 she competed as Shirley Parker. Parker represented the England team at the 1966 British Empire and Commonwealth Games in Kingston, Jamaica, where she participated in the foil events. She won a gold medal in the team foil with Joyce Pearce and Janet Wardell-Yerburgh, in addition to winning a silver medal in the individual event.
