= Joyce Pearce =

British fencer

Personal information
- Nationality: British (English)
- Born: Third quarter 1932 Devonport, England
- Died: 2011

Sport
- Sport: Fencing
- Event: foil
- Club: London Fencing Club
Medal record
Fencing
Representing England
British Empire & Commonwealth Games
Gold medal – first place	1966 Kingston	foil team

Joyce L. M. Pearce (1932-2011), was a female international fencer who competed for England.

== Biography ==
Pearce was a member of the London Fencing Club.

Pearce represented the England team at the 1966 British Empire and Commonwealth Games in Kingston, Jamaica, where she participated in the foil events. She won a gold medal in the team foil with Shirley Parker and Janet Wardell-Yerburgh.
