= Osmund Reynolds =

Perinatal and neonatal paediatrician

Professor Osmund Reynolds CBE FRS FRCP FRCOG FRCPCH FMedSci
- Born: 3 February 1933; Brighton, East Sussex, England
- Died: 24 April 2017 (aged 84)
- Education: St Thomas' Hospital
- Known for: Research into fetal and neonatal lung formation.
- Awards: CBE, James Spence Medal
- Scientific career
- Fields: Pediatrics
- Workplaces: University College Hospital; University College London; Middlesex School of Medicine

Edward Osmund Royle Reynolds (born 3 February 1933, in Brighton - died 24 April 2017), was a British paediatrician and neonatologist who was most notable for the introduction of new techniques intended to improve the survival of newborns, especially those with respiratory failure, and for a series of papers regarding the value of techniques such as ultrasound imaging, nuclear magnetic resonance spectroscopy, and near infrared spectroscopy in determining the development and response to injury of the infant brain after birth.

== Life ==
Edmunds was the son of Edward Reynolds, a solicitor, and his wife, Edna (née Jones). He was educated at St Paul's School, London, then qualified at St Thomas' Hospital in 1958, interrupting his course to study science with Henry Barcroft and Maureen Young.

Reynolds was a world championship fencer, winning a bronze in the team event in the 1955 World Fencing Championships. Nicknamed Ossie he also represented Wales at the 1954 British Empire and Commonwealth Games in Vancouver, in the Épée, Sabre and Foil events.

== Career ==
In 1962, Reynolds travelled to the United States as a research fellow with Dav Cook visiting both the Boston Children's Hospital and Harvard Medical School. While there, they researched hyaline membrane disease. After a quick visit to Yale School of Medicine, Reynolds returned to the UK in 1964, taking an appointment at the Department of Paediatrics at University College Hospital in London, working under Professor Leonard B. Strang and to help him establish a unit to study the fetal and neonatal lung. This collaboration led to team which produced a series of remarkable reports on pathophysiology.

Starting in 1976, Reynolds was appointed to the Chair in Neonatal Paediatrics at the University of London, becoming Emeritus in 1996. He was also Head of the Department of Paediatrics at University College London and the Middlesex School of Medicine from 1987 to 1992.

He also served as president of the Neonatal Society.

== Contribututions ==
Reynolds was one of the first pioneers in imagining to appraise brain injury in children suffering from Hypoxia. He researched the condition in both piglets and lambs, and this research led to formation of a team, that was able to build a device that captured the first human phosphorus nuclear magnetic resonance spectroscopy. This led to Reynolds most important discovery, that brain cells didn't die after injury, but instead there was a period where the physician could intervene to repair the injury. This research led to the discovery of therapeutic hypothermia, that cooled the brain to reduce damage, a treatment that is standard for babies with brain damage.

=== Awards and honours ===
His awards include the

- James Spence Medal,
- Dawson-Williams Memorial Prize,
- Harding Award
- Maternité Prize.

He was elected a Fellow of the Royal Society in 1993. Reynolds was appointed a CBE in 1995 and elected a Fellow of the Academy of Medical Sciences in 1998.

== Bibliography ==
From 1978 to 1992 he was Specialist Adviser to a House of Commons Health Select Committee and its predecessors, contributing to four reports:

- House of Commons Social Services Committee, Session 1979 -1980 (1980). Perinatal and Neonatal Mortality. HMSO. ISBN 978-0102976809.
- House of Commons Social Services Committee, Session 1983 -1984 (1984). Perinatal and Neonatal Mortality: Follow-up. HMSO. ISBN 978-0102308846.
- House of Commons Social Services Committee, Session 1988 -1989 (1989). Perinatal, Neonatal and Infant Mortality. HMSO.
- House of Commons Social Services Committee, Session 1991 -1992 (1992). Maternity Services. HMSO.

The following papers were his most important.

- Wray, Susan; Cope, Mark; Delpy, David T.; John S, Wyatt; E. Osmund R., Reynolds (30 March 1988). "Characterization of the near infrared absorption spectra of cytochrome aa3 and haemoglobin for the non-invasive monitoring of cerebral oxygenation". Biochimica et Biophysica Acta (BBA) - Bioenergetics. 991 (1): 184–192. doi:10.1016/0005-2728(88)90069-2. PMID 2831976.
- Roth, Simon C.; Edwards, A. D; Cady, Ernest B.; Delpy, David T.; Wyatt, John S.; Azzopardi, Denis; Baudin, Jenny; Townsend, Jan; Ann L. Stewart, Ann L.; Reynolds, E. Osmund R. (April 1992). "Relation Between Cerebral Oxidative Metabolism Following Birth Asphyxia, and Neurodevelopmental Outcome and Brain Growth at One Year". Developmental Medicine & Child Neurology. 34 (4): 285–295. doi:10.1111/j.1469-8749.1992.tb11432.x. PMID 1572514. S2CID 6823414.
