= Joseph Rorke (fencer) =

Scottish fencer

Personal information
- Nationality: British (Scottish)
- Born: Scotland

Sport
- Sport: Fencing, Épée
- Event: Foil
- Club: Glasgow Fencing Club
Medal record
Fencing
Representing Scotland
British Empire & Commonwealth Games
Bronze medal – third place	1966 Kingston	foil team

Joseph Rorke is a former international fencer from Scotland who won a bronze medal at the Commonwealth Games.

== Biography ==
Rorke was a member of the Glasgow Fencing Club. and finished runner-up behind George Sandor in the 1966 Edgbaston Cup foil final and was also runner-up in the De Escofet Cup épée final.

Rorke represented the Scotland team at the 1966 British Empire and Commonwealth Games in Kingston, Jamaica, where he participated in the team foil event. He subsequently won a bronze medal in the team foil with Robert Wilson and George Sandor. Rorke had also planned to take part in the individual foil event but sprained an ankle and was unable to compete, deciding to rest the ankle for the team event.

In 1967 he represented Scotland in the home nations tournament.
