= Shirley Burgess =

British sprinter

Personal information
- Nationality: British (English)
- Born: c.1934

Sport
- Sport: Athletics
- Event: Sprinting
- Club: Woolwich Polytechnic Harriers
Medal record
Athletics
Representing England
British Empire & Commonwealth Games
Silver medal – second place	1954 Vancouver	4 x 110y Relay

Shirley Anne Burgess (born about 1934) was a female athlete who competed for England.

== Biography ==
Burgess finished second behind Anne Pashley in the 100 yards event at the 1953 WAAA Championships.

Burgess represented England and won a silver medal in the 4 x 110 Yard Relay at the 1954 British Empire and Commonwealth Games in Vancouver, Canada and also competed in the 100 and 220 yards. She also represented Woolwich Polytechnic.

Burgess was trained by Brian Shenton and effectively had her career interrupted by appendicitis.
