= Joyce Fenton =

New Zealand fencer

Personal information
- Born: Alison Joyce Francis; 9 July 1927
- Died: 15 January 2014 (aged 86) Auckland, New Zealand
- Spouse: Alan Harold Fenton

Sport
- Country: New Zealand
- Sport: Fencing

Achievements and titles
- National finals: Foil champion (1962, 1964, 1965)
Medal record
Representing New Zealand
Women's fencing
British Empire and Commonwealth Games
Bronze medal – third place	1966 Kingston	Foil Team

Alison Joyce Fenton (née Francis; 9 July 1927 – 15 January 2014) was a New Zealand fencer.

As Joyce Francis, she competed in the women's foil at the 1954 British Empire and Commonwealth Games in Vancouver, where she recorded one win and finished sixth out of seven competitors.

Fenton won the New Zealand national women's foil title in 1962, 1964, and 1965. At the 1966 British Empire and Commonwealth Games in Kingston, she won the bronze medal in the women's foil team alongside Pam French and Gaye McDermit. At those games, she also competed in the individual foil, but was unplaced.

Fenton died in Auckland on 15 January 2014, and her ashes were buried at Purewa Cemetery.
