= Michael Amberg =

British fencer (1926–2001)

Personal information
- Nationality: British (English)
- Born: 25 April 1926 London, England
- Died: 24 July 2001 (aged 75) Milton Keynes, England
- Height: 193 cm (6 ft 4 in)
- Weight: 83 kg (183 lb)

Sport
- Sport: Fencing
- Event: Sabre
Medal record
Fencing
Representing England
British Empire & Commonwealth Games
Gold medal – first place	1954 Vancouver	sabre individual
Silver medal – second place	1954 Vancouver	sabre team
Bronze medal – third place	1958 Cardiff	sabre individual
Gold medal – first place	1958 Cardiff	sabre team
Gold medal – first place	1962 Perth	sabre team

Michael John Amberg (25 April 1926 – 24 July 2001) was a British fencer who competed at the 1960 Summer Olympics.

== Biography ==
Amberg was educated at Charterhouse School and aged 17 won both the sabre and foil titles at the Public Schools Championship. He was capped at international level in May 1952 and won the Cole Memorial Trophy.

Amberg represented England at three Commonwealth Games and won six medals; three gold medals, a silver medal and a bronze medal in the sabre events from 1954 to 1962. He was a three times British fencing champion, winning the sabre title at the British Fencing Championships in 1957, 1958 and 1959.

At the 1960 Olympic Games in Rome, Amberg competed in the individual and team sabre events.
