= Pam French =

New Zealand fencer

Personal information
- Born: Pamela Rae Satterthwaite; 26 December 1937 (age 88) Takapuna, New Zealand
- Spouse: Terence Edward French

Sport
- Country: New Zealand
- Sport: Fencing

Achievements and titles
- National finals: Foil champion (1963)
Medal record
Women's fencing
Representing New Zealand
British Empire and Commonwealth Games
Bronze medal – third place	1966 Kingston	Team foil

Pamela Rae French (née Satterthwaite, born 26 December 1937) is a former New Zealand fencer who won a bronze medal for her country at the 1966 British Empire and Commonwealth Games.

== Biography ==
French was born in Takapuna on 26 December 1937, the daughter of Eileen Daphne Satterthwaite (née White) and Thomas Satterthwaite of Putāruru. As an adult, she became a pharmacist, and married Terence Edward French.

At the 1963 New Zealand national fencing championships, she won the women's foil title. In 1965, she was a member of the New Zealand team that competed against Australia. The following year, she represented New Zealand in the women's individual and team foil events at the 1966 British Empire and Commonwealth Games in Kingston, Jamaica. Alongside Gaye McDermit and Joyce Fenton, she won a bronze medal in the team foils. However, in the individual foil, she did not progress to the final pool stage.
