= Georges Pouliot =

Canadian fencer (1923–2019)

Personal information
- Born: February 6, 1923
- Died: May 8, 2019 (aged 96)

Sport
- Sport: Fencing

Georges Pouliot (February 6, 1923 – May 8, 2019) was a Canadian fencer. He competed in five events at the 1948 Summer Olympics.
