= Dorothy Kozak =

Canadian sprinter

Personal information
- Born: 17 April 1932 Calgary, Alberta, Canada
- Died: 14 June 2009 (aged 77)

Sport
- Sport: Sprinting
- Event: 4 × 100 metres relay

Dorothy Kozak (17 April 1932 – 14 June 2009) was a Canadian sprinter. She competed in the women's 4 × 100 metres relay at the 1956 Summer Olympics. At the 1954 British Empire and Commonwealth Games, Kozak competed in the 100 yards not progressing past the heats and the 4×110 yards relay winning a bronze medal with Annabelle Murray, Geraldine Bemister and Margery Squires.
