= William Beatley =

British Olympics fencer (1923–2005)

Personal information
- Nationality: British (English)
- Born: 11 November 1923
- Died: 22 July 2005 (aged 81)

Sport
- Sport: Fencing
Medal record
Fencing
Representing England
British Empire & Commonwealth Games
Silver medal – second place	1954 Vancouver	sabre team

William Maurice Beatley (11 November 1923 – 22 July 2005) was a British fencer who competed at the 1952 Summer Olympics.

== Biography ==
Beatley was educated at Bedford School and studied medicine at Cambridge, winning his blue on two occasions. He continued medical studies at the University of London. At the 1952 Olympic Games in Helsinki, Beatley competed in the individual and team sabre events.

He represented England and won a silver medal in the team sabre at the 1954 British Empire and Commonwealth Games in Vancouver, Canada. He also competed in the individual sabre event.
