= Ralph Cooperman =

British fencer (1927–2009)

Personal information
- Born: 16 November 1927 Stoke Newington, London, England
- Died: 22 March 2009 (aged 81) London, England
- Height: 5 ft 8.5 in (174.0 cm)
- Weight: 165 lb (75 kg)

Sport
- Sport: Fencing
- Event(s): Foil and sabre
- Club: Salle Paul Fencing Club
Medal record
Fencing
Representing England
British Empire & Commonwealth Games
Gold medal – first place	1954 Vancouver	foil team
Silver medal – second place	1954 Vancouver	sabre individual
Silver medal – second place	1954 Vancouver	sabre team
Gold medal – first place	1958 Cardiff	sabre team
Silver medal – second place	1958 Cardiff	sabre individual
Gold medal – first place	1962 Perth	foil team
Gold medal – first place	1962 Perth	sabre individual
Gold medal – first place	1962 Perth	sabre team
Bronze medal – third place	1962 Perth	foil individual
Gold medal – first place	1966 Kingston	sabre individual
Gold medal – first place	1966 Kingston	sabre team

Arnold Ralph Cooperman (16 November 1927 – 22 March 2009) was a British three-time Olympic foil and sabre fencer.

== Biography ==
Cooperman was born in Stoke Newington, England, and was Jewish.

He won the British junior championships in foil and sabre in 1950 and 1951, and was a three times British fencing champion, winning the sabre title at the British Fencing Championships in 1954, 1960 and 1961.

Cooperman was a medalist at the 1950 Maccabiah Games, the 1953 Maccabiah Games, and the 1969 Maccabiah Games. He competed in the world championships in 1953.

He competed on behalf of Great Britain in foil and sabre at the 1956 in Melbourne, and in Rome in the 1960 Summer Olympics and Tokyo in the 1964 Summer Olympics.

He represented England and won a gold medal and two silver medals in the foil and sabre respectively at the 1954 British Empire and Commonwealth Games in Vancouver, Canada.

At the 1958 British Empire and Commonwealth Games won a gold and silver in the sabre events and four years later at the 1962 British Empire and Commonwealth Games he won triple gold and a bronze medal in the foil (behind teammate Allan Jay).

Cooperman represented the England team at the 1966 British Empire and Commonwealth Games in Kingston, Jamaica, where he participated in the sabre events. He won a 6th and 7th gold medal respectively in the individual and team sabre, the latter with Richard Oldcorn and John Rayden.
