= Aileen Harding =

Welsh fencer

Personal information
- Born: 1933 Cardiff, Wales

Sport
- Sport: Fencing
- Event: Foil
- Club: Cardiff Fencing Club
Medal record
Fencing
Representing (Wales)
British Empire & Commonwealth Games
Bronze medal – third place	1954 Vancouver	foil

Aileen G. M. Harding (born 1933) is a former foil fencer from Wales, who won a bronze medal at the 1954 British Empire and Commonwealth Games (now Commonwealth Games).

== Biography ==
Harding, born in Cardiff, Wales, was the 1949 British schoolgirl's champion and attended the pioneering Anstey College of Physical Education.

Harding represented the Welsh team and won a bronze medal in the foil competition at the 1954 British Empire and Commonwealth Games in Vancouver, Canada.

The following year, she married Edward Tattersall in Cardiff during 1955.

The couple then lived on the Isle of Wight and settled in Hampshire with their two sons. Aileen taught physical education, specialising in gymnastics, in a primary state school.

Aileen died in Lyndhurst, Hampshire, in February 2026.
