= Arthur Pilbrow =

British fencer (1902–1987)

Personal information
- Born: 18 May 1902 England
- Died: 16 July 1987 (aged 85)

Sport
- Sport: Fencing
Medal record
Representing England
British Empire Games
Gold medal – first place	1950 Auckland	Foil team
Gold medal – first place	1950 Auckland	Sabre team
Gold medal – first place	1950 Auckland	Sabre individual

Arthur Gordon Pilbrow (18 May 1902 – 16 July 1987) was a British fencer.

== Biography ==
Pilbrow competed at the 1936 and 1948 Summer Olympics.

He represented England, and won three gold medals in fencing at the 1950 British Empire Games in Auckland, New Zealand. He was a four times British fencing champion, winning the sabre title at the British Fencing Championships in 1932, 1935, 1938 and 1950.

In 1950 he opened the Ludgate Garden Restaurant in London.
