= Bunker adjustment factor =

Surcharge on sea freight charges

Bunker adjustment factor, bunker surcharge or BAF refers to the floating part of sea freight charges which represents additions due to oil prices. BAF charges used to be determined by Carrier Conferences to be applicable for a certain period on a certain trade route.

The European Commission banned Carrier Conferences as of October 17, 2008. The shipping lines now set their own independent BAF rates. They will be closely monitored by the EC to ensure that no collusion is taking place.

Fluctuations in oil prices will alter rates depending on any of a wide variation in applications...
