= Mary Glen-Haig =

British fencer (1918–2014)

Dame Mary Glen-Haig DBE
Personal information
- Born: Mary Alison James; 12 July 1918 Islington, London, England
- Died: 15 November 2014 (aged 96) Oxfordshire, England

Sport
- Sport: Fencing
Medal record
Women's fencing
Representing England
British Empire and Commonwealth Games
Gold medal – first place	1950 Auckland	Individual foil
Gold medal – first place	1954 Vancouver	Individual foil
Bronze medal – third place	1958 Cardiff	Individual foil

Dame Mary Alison Glen-Haig, DBE (née James; 12 July 1918 – 15 November 2014) was a British fencer who competed in four Olympic games in 1948, 1952, 1956 and 1960. She was born in London, the daughter of William James, a fencer at the 1908 London Olympics. She began competing professionally in 1937 and continued until 1960, during which time she won two gold medals at the Commonwealth Games and competed in four Olympics in the women's individual foil events. She was one of the first female members of the International Olympic Committee in 1982 and was created a dame in 1993. After London's successful bid for the 2012 Summer Olympics in 2005, she was active as the host nation's ambassador to the games.

== Early life ==
Glen-Haig was born Mary Alison James on 12 July 1918 in London. Her father, William James, was a competitor in fencing at the 1908 Summer Olympics in London. Her brother and sister took up tennis, like their mother. Her interest in fencing arose from time spent with her father, and she often trained and practised with him.

She began participating in regional and world championships in 1937 and continued to be active in these tournaments until 1959. She first qualified for the Olympic Games in 1948, the second time that they were held in her hometown of London. The evening before she was to participate in these games, she was still working at King's College Hospital, as there was no true Olympic Village at these games.

== Olympic and Commonwealth career ==
The night before she was due to compete, Glen-Haig slept on a camp bed in a room with two other women. In the Women's Foil, Individual competition, she reached the finals, but did not medal, placing 8th. She competed in the same event in at the 1952, 1956 and 1960 Summer Olympics, as well as in the Women's Foil, Team in 1960, but never again reached the finals. She claimed to have never worried whether or not she actually won a medal. During this time, she participated in the British Empire Games (later the Commonwealth Games) from 1950 to 1958. She won gold medals in the fencing competition in both 1950 and 1954 and she represented England and won a bronze medal in the individual foil at the 1958 British Empire and Commonwealth Games in Cardiff, Wales.

== Later life ==
Glen-Haig eventually moved to West Kensington, London, where she worked at a hospital as district administrator from 1974 until 1982, the year that she was made one of the first female members of the International Olympic Committee. She was also Chairman of the Central Council of Physical Recreation during the 1970s. She continued to fence until her mid-to-late 70s. As an IOC representative she supervised the first edition of the Women's Islamic Games in February 1993 and ensured the smooth running of the competitions. 407 athletes in eight different sports took part in the first edition of the Games from such countries as Azerbaijan, Turkmenistan, Tajikistan, Kyrgyzstan, Bahrain, Bangladesh, Pakistan, Malaysia, Syria and Iran. She was an honorary member of the IOC.

Glen-Haig was appointed a Member of the Order of the British Empire (MBE) in the 1971 Queen's Birthday Honours, promoted to Commander (CBE) in the 1977 New Year Honours, and Dame Commander (DBE) in the 1993 New Year Honours. At the conclusion of the 2004 Summer Olympics, Glen-Haig recited the English version of an ode in praise of Athens. She served as the ambassador from Britain to the 2012 Summer Olympics, which was held in London. She died at the age of 96 on 15 November 2014.
