= Charles de Beaumont =

British fencer (1902–1972)

Personal information
- Born: 5 May 1902 Liverpool, England
- Died: 7 July 1972 (aged 70) Knightsbridge, England

Sport
- Sport: Fencing
Medal record
Fencing
Representing England
British Empire Games
Gold medal – first place	1950 Auckland	Épée individual
Gold medal – first place	1950 Auckland	Sabre team
Silver medal – second place	1950 Auckland	Épée team
Gold medal – first place	1954 Vancouver	Épée team

Charles de Beaumont (5 May 1902 – 7 July 1972) was a British fencer.

== Fencing career ==
De Beaumont competed at the 1936, 1948 and 1952 Summer Olympics.

He represented England and won two gold medals in the Épée individual and the Sabre team and a silver medal in the Épée team at the 1950 British Empire Games in Auckland, New Zealand. He also represented England and won a gold medal in the Épée team at the 1954 British Empire and Commonwealth Games in Vancouver, Canada.

He was a four times British fencing champion, winning the épée title at the British Fencing Championships in 1936, 1937, 1938 and 1953. He was an antiques dealer by trade.
