= Roland Asselin =

Canadian fencer (1917–2003)

Personal information
- Born: May 18, 1917
- Died: December 7, 2003 (aged 86) New York, New York, United States

Sport
- Sport: Fencing

Roland George Arthur Asselin (May 18, 1917 – December 7, 2003) was a Canadian fencer. He competed at the 1948, 1952 and 1956 Summer Olympics.
