= Elizabeth Hamilton (fencer) =

Canadian fencer (1918–2011)

Personal information
- Born: Elizabeth Florence Robson; August 10, 1918 Montreal, Quebec, Canada
- Died: January 30, 2011 (aged 92) Lethbridge, Alberta, Canada

Sport
- Sport: Fencing

Elizabeth Florence Hamilton (née Robson, later Hale; August 10, 1918 – January 30, 2011) was a Canadian fencer. She competed in the women's individual foil event at the 1948 Summer Olympics.

Born and raised in Montreal, she was a daughter of Alfred Atkinson and Maud Robson; her father was killed in a 1921 workplace accident at the National Drug Company in which a boiler exploded. In 1943, she married future politician William McLean Hamilton, the son of Ernie Hamilton, who competed in lacrosse for Canada at the 1908 Summer Olympics. She later married F. Earle Hale around 1953 and attended McGill University to earn a Master of Library Science degree after which she worked as a librarian in Montreal. She moved to Lethbridge, Alberta in 1999 and died there in 2011 at the age of 92.
