= Carl Schwende =

Canadian fencer (1920–2002)

Personal information
- Born: 20 February 1920 Basel, Switzerland
- Died: 30 December 2002 (aged 82) Montreal, Quebec, Canada

Sport
- Sport: Fencing

Carl Schwende (20 February 1920 – 30 December 2002) was a Canadian fencer. He competed in the individual foil event at the 1960 Summer Olympics.
