= Gaye McDermit =

New Zealand fencer

Personal information
- Born: Gaye Lynette McDermit; 9 May 1945 (age 81)
- Spouse: Ron Horne

Sport
- Country: New Zealand
- Sport: Fencing
Medal record
Women's fencing
Representing New Zealand
British Empire and Commonwealth Games
Bronze medal – third place	1966 Kingston	Individual foil
Bronze medal – third place	1966 Kingston	Team foil

Gaye Lynette Horne (née McDermit, born 9 May 1945) is a former New Zealand fencer who won two bronze medals representing her country at the 1966 British Empire and Commonwealth Games.

== Biography ==
Born on 9 May 1945, McDermit finished as runner-up in the women's foil at the 1965 New Zealand national fencing championships. The same year, she was part of the New Zealand team that competed against Australia.

At the time of the 1966 British Empire and Commonwealth Games, McDermit was working as a typist. At those games, she represented New Zealand in both the women's individual and teams foil events. She won a bronze medal in the individual foil, and then won a second bronze alongside Pam French and Joyce Fenton in the team event.

McDermitt also competed in the individual and team foil events again at the 1970 British Commonwealth Games in Edinburgh, but was unplaced.
