= René Paul =

British fencer (1921–2008)

Personal information
- Nationality: British (English)
- Born: 20 January 1921 Paddington, London, England
- Died: 16 June 2008 (aged 87) London, England
- Height: 174 cm (5 ft 9 in)
- Weight: 76 kg (168 lb)

Sport
- Sport: Fencing
- Club: Salle Paul FC, London
Medal record
Fencing
Representing England
British Empire Games
Gold medal – first place	1950 Auckland	Foil individual
Gold medal – first place	1950 Auckland	Foil team
Silver medal – second place	1950 Auckland	Épée team
Gold medal – first place	1954 Vancouver	Foil individual
Gold medal – first place	1954 Vancouver	Foil team
Gold medal – first place	1954 Vancouver	Épée team
Silver medal – second place	1954 Vancouver	Épée individual
Gold medal – first place	1958 Cardiff	Foil team
Bronze medal – third place	1958 Cardiff	Foil individual
Gold medal – first place	1962 Perth	Foil team

Ronald René Charles Paul (20 January 1921 – 16 June 2008) was a British fencer.

== Fencing career ==
Paul was a member of the Salle Paul fencing Club of London. He competed at four Olympic Games and won ten Commonwealth Games medals.

He represented England and won two gold medals in the foil individual and team and a silver medal in the Épée team at the 1950 British Empire Games in Auckland, New Zealand.

Four years later he won four medals at the 1954 British Empire and Commonwealth Games in Vancouver, British Columbia, Canada; three golds in the Épée team and Foil individual and team and a silver in the Épée individual. Two more medals were won for the England team during the 1958 British Empire and Commonwealth Games in Cardiff, Wales and his tenth and final medal was won at the 1962 British Empire and Commonwealth Games in Perth, Western Australia.

Paul was a five times British fencing champion, winning five foil titles at the British Fencing Championships, from 1947 to 1962.

== Personal life ==
He is part of a famous fencing and athletics family; wife Doreen (née Young), sons Graham Paul and Barry Paul, brother Raymond Paul and nephew Steven Paul.
