= Rod Steel =

Australian fencer

Personal information
- Born: 28 December 1928
- Died: 11 March 2009 (aged 80)

Sport
- Sport: Fencing
Medal record
Fencing
Representing Australia
British Empire (and Commonwealth) Games
Silver medal – second place	1954 Vancouver	Men's Team Foil
Bronze medal – third place	1954 Vancouver	Men's Team Sabre

Roddick Murdoch Steel (28 December 1928 – 11 March 2009) was an Australian fencer. He competed in the team foil event at the 1956 Summer Olympics.
