= Laurence Harding-Smith =

Australian fencer (1929–2021)

Personal information
- Born: 11 December 1929
- Died: 4 July 2021 (aged 91) Brisbane, Queensland, Australia

Sport
- Sport: Fencing
Medal record
Fencing
Representing Australia
British Empire (and Commonwealth) Games
Bronze medal – third place	1954 Vancouver	Men's Team Epee
Bronze medal – third place	1954 Vancouver	Men's Team Sabre

Laurence Neville Harding-Smith (11 December 1929 – 4 July 2021) was an Australian fencer. He competed in the individual épée event at the 1956 Summer Olympics.
