= Edward Brooke (fencer) =

Canadian fencer (1916–2002)

Personal information
- Born: 31 December 1916 Didsbury, Alberta, Canada
- Died: 1 November 2002 (aged 85) Calgary, Alberta, Canada
- Education: University of Alberta (BSc., 1942)

Sport
- Country: Canada
- Sport: Fencing

Edward Hugh Brooke (31 December 1916 – 1 November 2002) was a Canadian fencer. He competed in the individual foil and épée events at the 1952 Summer Olympics.

== Biography ==
In 1942 Brooke graduated Bachelor of Science in chemical engineering from the University of Alberta. That year he moved to Montreal to begin working for the McColl-Frontenac Oil Company, which in 1959 became Texaco Canada Limited. In 1952 he was made chief engineer, and in 1969 was appointed manager of the company's engineering department.

In July 1952, Brooke competed in the foil and épee events at the 1952 Summer Olympics in Helsinki, placing 6th and 5th respectively.

In 1973 Brooke relocated to Calgary. He died in Calgary on 1 November 2002 at age 85.
