= Ivan Lund =

Australian fencer (1929–1992)

Personal information
- Born: 13 May 1929 Melbourne, Australia
- Died: 9 April 1992 (aged 62) Pullenvale, Queensland, Australia

Sport
- Sport: Fencing
- Club: VRI Fencing Club
Medal record
Fencing
Representing Australia
British Empire (and Commonwealth) Games
Gold medal – first place	1954 Vancouver	Men's Epee
Silver medal – second place	1954 Vancouver	Men's Team Foil
Bronze medal – third place	1954 Vancouver	Men's Team Sabre
Bronze medal – third place	1954 Vancouver	Men's Team Epee
Silver medal – second place	1958 Cardiff	Men's Foil
Silver medal – second place	1958 Cardiff	Men's Team Foil
Silver medal – second place	1958 Cardiff	Men's Team Sabre
Bronze medal – third place	1958 Cardiff	Men's Team Epee
Gold medal – first place	1962 Perth	Men's Epee
Silver medal – second place	1962 Perth	Men's Team Foil
Silver medal – second place	1962 Perth	Men's Team Epee

Ivan Bernard Lund (13 May 1929 – 9 April 1992) was an Australian fencer. He competed at four Olympic Games. He was a longstanding member of the Melbourne-based VRI Fencing Club.

== Achievements ==
Ivan Lund competed in four Olympic Games. In 1952 in Helsinki, he competed in all individual and team competitions with the foil, epee and sabre, but did not reach the finals in any competition. Four years later in Melbourne he was eliminated with the Sword again in the preliminary round of the singles and with the team, also in 1960 in Rome in the foil singles and with the Epee team. At the 1964 Summer Olympics in Tokyo, Lund, who was the flag bearer of the Australian delegation at the opening ceremony, competed individually and with the team with the foil and the epee. In all competitions he did not make it past the first round.

Lund won a total of 13 medals at the Commonwealth Games between 1950 and 1962, winning gold three times, twice in the epee singles and once with the epee team. He also won six silver medals and four bronze medals, of which he also won several with the foil and the sabre.
