= John Fethers =

Australian fencer

Personal information
- Born: 4 December 1929 Melbourne, Australia
- Died: 30 March 2010 (aged 80) Caulfield, Victoria, Australia

Sport
- Sport: Fencing
- Club: VRI Fencing Club
Medal record
Fencing
Representing Australia
British Empire (and Commonwealth) Games
Silver medal – second place	1954 Vancouver	Men's Foil
Silver medal – second place	1954 Vancouver	Men's Team Foil
Bronze medal – third place	1954 Vancouver	Men's Team Sabre
Bronze medal – third place	1954 Vancouver	Men's Sabre

John Erle Fethers (4 December 1929 – 30 March 2010) was an Australian fencer. He competed in six events at the 1952 Summer Olympics. He was a longstanding member and coach at the Melbourne-based VRI Fencing Club. On 10 October 2009 in recognition of a significant international fencing career, outstanding personal contribution to Australian fencing, and lasting legacy in the training and development of numerous coaches and Olympic athletes, he was inducted as a Living Legend to the VRI Hall of Fame.

== Early years ==
Born in Melbourne, he began fencing at the age of 17 - the same year the Australian Amateur Fencing Association was formed (1946). John's interest and passion for fencing were inspired by the films of Australian actor Errol Flynn with whom he bore an almost identical size and appearance. (He eventually met Flynn at Paris airport in 1954). A natural fencing talent, he won the 1946 Victorian novice and intermediate foil championships and won bronze in the Victorian Open foil championship. In 1949 he won bronze for foil at the inaugural Australian Fencing Championships. Shortly after, he was selected to represent Australia in foil at the 1950 British Empire Games in Auckland, New Zealand and won silver. At the 1951 Australian Fencing Championships he became the first fencer to win gold in epee, foil and sabre - a feat that has only been matched once.

== International career ==
Seeking international experience, he joined the 1950s Australian 'invasion' of Britain. He was selected to represent Australia in the foil at the Helsinki 1952 Summer Olympics - the first time an Australian fencing team competed at the Olympic Games. In 1953 and 1954 he reached the semi-finals of the men's individual foil at the FIE World Championships. He won silver in foil and bronze in sabre for Australia at the Vancouver 1954 British Empire Games in Canada. In 1954, he won the foil title at the British Fencing Championships. He later reached the finals round at the individual men's foil at the 1955 FIE World Championship. While selected to represent Australia at the Melbourne 1956 Summer Olympics he was unable to return to Australia insufficient time to compete.

== Honours ==
In 1961, he was awarded the Challenge Gilbert Duval, one of Europe's highest fencing honours, awarded to the fencer judged the best consistent fencer over a five-year period. In 1956, after a year's study and training at the French Academy of Arms, he became a Maitre d'Armes (Master of Arms).

== Later years ==
He returned to Australia in 1964 and became a member and coach at VRI Fencing Club. He coached the 1964 Australian Olympic Fencing Team before being appointed national coach in 1966. He remained a national coach and coach at VRI for several decades, then at La Trobe University Fencing Club from 1990 to 1995, before eventually retiring. He later returned from retirement to coach at the Melbourne University Fencing Club before his final well-deserved retirement. Drawing on a lifetime interest and passion for fencing in performance, he appeared in several films and short films and choreographed duels for film, stage and television. His achievements in fencing have never been bettered by a fellow Australian.
