= Great Britain at the 1960 Summer Olympics =

- Flag of the United Kingdom
- IOC code: GBR (GRB used at these Games)
- NOC: British Olympic Association

in Rome
- Competitors: 253 (206 men and 47 women) in 17 sports
- Flag bearer: Richard McTaggart
- Medals Ranked 12th: Gold 2 Silver 6 Bronze 12 Total 20

Summer Olympics appearances (overview)
- 1896; 1900; 1904; 1908; 1912; 1920; 1924; 1928; 1932; 1936; 1948; 1952; 1956; 1960; 1964; 1968; 1972; 1976; 1980; 1984; 1988; 1992; 1996; 2000; 2004; 2008; 2012; 2016; 2020; 2024

Other related appearances
- 1906 Intercalated Games

Great Britain, represented by the British Olympic Association (BOA), competed at the 1960 Summer Olympics in Rome, Italy. 253 competitors, 206 men and 47 women, took part in 130 events in 17 sports. British athletes have competed in every Summer Olympic Games.

The Rome Games continued Great Britain and Northern Ireland's disappointing run in the Olympics, with British athletes picking up only two gold medals (down from six in 1956). Overall, they won twenty medals, finishing twelfth.

Shortly after the games, rumours circulated from several teams that the British team had fielded competitors in their women's Athletics team who had male characteristics. The allegations were instantly dismissed by the British team. However, a report was issued the following year by British professor, Thomas Jeffcote, who claimed that two of the British team were intersex. Neither was named but he stated one was twenty years old while the other was a teenage 100 yard sprinter. He further claimed her Athletic ability deteriorated rapidly after undergoing an operation in 1961.

== Medallists ==
Medals by sport
Sport	Gold medal	Silver medal	Bronze medal	Total
Athletics	1	3	4	8
Swimming	1	1	1	3
Fencing	0	2	0	2
Boxing	0	0	3	3
Diving	0	0	2	2
Equestrian	0	0	1	1
Weightlifting	0	0	1	1
Total	2	6	12	20

=== Gold ===
- Don Thompson — Athletics, Men's 50 km Walk
- Anita Lonsbrough — Swimming, Women's 200m Breaststroke

=== Silver ===
- Dorothy Hyman — Athletics, Women's 100 metres
- Carole Quinton — Athletics, Women's 80m Hurdles
- Dorothy Shirley — Athletics, Women's High Jump
- Allan Jay — Fencing, Men's Épée Individual
- Allan Jay, Michael Howard, John Pelling, Henry Hoskyns, Raymond Harrison, and Michael Alexander — Fencing, Men's Épée Team
- Natalie Steward — Swimming, Women's 100m Backstroke

=== Bronze ===
- Peter Radford — Athletics, Men's 100 metres
- Peter Radford, David Jones, David Segal, and Neville Whitehead — Athletics, 4 × 100 m Relay
- Stan Vickers — Athletics, Men's 20 km Walk
- Dorothy Hyman — Athletics, Women's 200 metres
- Richard McTaggart — Boxing, Lightweight
- Jimmy Lloyd — Boxing, Welterweight
- William Fisher — Boxing, Light Middleweight
- Brian Phelps — Diving, Men's 10m Platform
- Elizabeth Ferris — Diving, Women's 3m Springboard
- David Broome and Sunsalve — Equestrian, Jumping Individual
- Natalie Steward — Swimming, Women's 100m Freestyle
- Louis Martin — Weightlifting, Middle-heavyweight

== Athletics ==
Men's Hammer Throw

- Mike Ellis

- Qualifying Round — 63.21 m
- Final Round — 54.22 m (→ 15th place)

Women's Discus Throw

- Suzanne Allday

- Qualifying Round — 41.12 m (→ did not advance, 21st place)

Women's Shot Put

- Suzanne Allday

- Qualifying Round — 13.10 m (→ did not advance, 16th place)

== Cycling ==
12 male cyclists represented Great Britain in 1960.

Individual road race

- Jim Hinds
- Bill Bradley
- William Holmes
- Ken Laidlaw

Team time trial

- Bill Bradley
- William Holmes
- Jim Hinds
- Ken Laidlaw

Sprint

- Lloyd Binch
- Karl Barton

1000m time trial

- Karl Barton

Tandem

- David Handley
- Eric Thompson

Team pursuit

- Barry Hoban
- Mike Gambrill
- Charlie McCoy
- Joseph McClean

== Diving ==
Men

Athlete	Event	Preliminary		Semi-final				Final			
Athlete	Event	Points	Rank	Points	Rank	Total	Rank	Points	Rank	Total	Rank
Keith Collin	3 m springboard	46.10	26	Did not advance							
Peter Squires	3 m springboard	50.23	20	Did not advance							
John Candler	10 m platform	50.20	17	Did not advance							
Brian Phelps	10 m platform	57.35	1 Q	44.50	3	101.85	2 Q	55.28	4	157.13	3rd place, bronze medalist(s)

Women

Athlete	Event	Preliminary		Semi-final				Final			
Athlete	Event	Points	Rank	Points	Rank	Total	Rank	Points	Rank	Total	Rank
Elizabeth Ferris	3 m springboard	52.37	3 Q	37.09	7	89.46	5 Q	46.63	4	139.09	3rd place, bronze medalist(s)
Ann Long	3 m springboard	50.87	7 Q	36.31	10	87.18	8 Q	42.45	7	129.63	6
Ann Long	10 m platform	52.12	5 Q	—				28.86	9	80.98	8
Norma Thomas	10 m platform	51.77	7 Q	—				30.44	7	82.21	6

== Fencing ==
18 fencers, 13 men and 5 women, represented Great Britain in 1960.

Men's foil

- Bill Hoskyns
- Allan Jay
- Ralph Cooperman

Men's team foil

- Bill Hoskyns, Allan Jay, Ralph Cooperman, Angus McKenzie, René Paul

Men's épée

- Allan Jay
- Bill Hoskyns
- John Pelling

Men's team épée

- Allan Jay, Michael Howard, John Pelling, Bill Hoskyns, Raymond Harrison, Michael Alexander

Men's sabre

- Alexander Leckie
- Ralph Cooperman
- Michael Amberg

Men's team sabre

- Ralph Cooperman, Michael Amberg, Alexander Leckie, Michael Straus, Donald Stringer

Women's foil

- Gillian Sheen
- Margaret Stafford
- Mary Glen-Haig

Women's team foil

- Gillian Sheen, Jeannette Bailey, Shirley Netherway, Mary Glen-Haig

== Gymnastics ==
The National Coach to the British Gymnastics team was Frank Turner, who had competed as a gymnast in the 1948, 1952 and 1956 Summer Olympics.

== Modern pentathlon ==
Three male pentathletes represented Great Britain in 1960.

Individual

- Patrick Harvey
- Donald Cobley
- Peter Little

Team

- Patrick Harvey
- Donald Cobley
- Peter Little

== Rowing ==
England had 26 male rowers participate in all seven rowing events in 1960.

Men's single sculls – unplaced

- Sidney Rand

Men's double sculls – unplaced

- Nicholas Birkmyre
- George Justicz

Men's coxless pair – unplaced

- Richard Nicholson
- Clive Marshall

Men's coxed pair – unplaced

- Stewart Farquharson
- Jeffrey Reeves
- Ken Lester (cox)

Men's coxless four – Fifth

- Christopher Davidge
- Michael Beresford
- Colin Porter
- John Vigurs

Men's coxed four – unplaced

- Simon Crosse
- Richard Knight
- John M. Russell
- John Tilbury
- Terrence Rosslyn-Smith (cox)

Men's eight – unplaced

- Richard Bate
- John Chester
- Michael Davis
- Ian Elliott
- Richard Fishlock
- Alexander Lindsay
- Graham Cooper
- Donald Shaw
- Peter Reynolds (cox)

== Shooting ==
Ten shooters represented Great Britain in 1960.

25 m pistol

- Tony Clark
- Robert Hassell

50 m pistol

- John Tomlinson
- Frank Dobson

50 m rifle, three positions

- Derek Robinson
- Steffen Cranmer

50 m rifle, prone

- Arthur Skinner
- William Godwin

Trap

- Joe Wheater
- Victor Huthart

== Swimming ==
Men

Athlete	Event	Heat		Semifinal		Final	
Athlete	Event	Time	Rank	Time	Rank	Time	Rank
Stanley Clarke	100 m freestyle	59.1	=31	Did not advance			
William O'Donnell	100 m freestyle	59.2	33	Did not advance			
Ian Black	400 m freestyle	4:21.9	3 Q	—		4:21.8	4
Richard Campion	400 m freestyle	4:32.3	12	—		Did not advance	
Richard Campion	1500 m freestyle	17:54.8	6 Q	—		18:22.7	8
Bob Sreenan	1500 m freestyle	18:57.1	19	—		Did not advance	
Haydn Rigby	100 m backstroke	1:06.2	25	Did not advance			
Graham Sykes	100 m backstroke	1:04.8	14 Q	1:04.7	=9	Did not advance	
Gerard Rowlinson	200 m breaststroke	2:45.0	22	Did not advance			
Christopher Walkden	200 m breaststroke	2:41.5	11 Q	2:41.7	12	Did not advance	
Ian Blyth	200 m butterfly	2:24.9	15 Q	2:26.8	=12	Did not advance	
Hamilton Milton; John Martin-Dye; Richard Campion; Ian Black	4 × 200 m freestyle	8:26.9	4 Q	—		8:28.1	4
Graham Sykes; Christopher Walkden; Ian Black; Stanley Clarke	4 × 100 m medley	4:16.8	8 Q	—		4:17.6	7

Women

Athlete	Event	Heat		Semifinal		Final	
Athlete	Event	Time	Rank	Time	Rank	Time	Rank
Natalie Steward	100 m freestyle	1:03.5	3 Q	1:02.9	3 Q	1:03.1	3rd place, bronze medalist(s)
Diana Wilkinson	100 m freestyle	1:07.5	=22	Did not advance			
Nan Rae	400 m freestyle	4:55.7	3 Q	—		4:59.7	6
Judy Samuel	400 m freestyle	5:12.9	13	—		Did not advance	
Sylvia Lewis	100 m backstroke	1:12.2	=6 Q	—		1:11.8	6
Natalie Steward	100 m backstroke	1:12.0	=4 Q	—		1:10.8	2nd place, silver medalist(s)
Christine Gosden	200 m breaststroke	2:56.9	9	—		Did not advance	
Anita Lonsbrough	200 m breaststroke	2:53.3 OR	2 Q	—		2:49.5 WR	1st place, gold medalist(s)
Jean Oldroyd	100 m butterfly	1:14.2	=11	—		Did not advance	
Sheila Watt	100 m butterfly	1:12.3	5 Q	—		1:13.3	4
Natalie Steward; Beryl Noakes; Judy Samuel; Christine Harris	4 × 100 m freestyle	4:24.4	5 Q	—		4:24.6	5
Sylvia Lewis; Anita Lonsbrough; Sheila Watt; Natalie Steward; Jean Oldroyd	4 × 100 m medley	4:49.0	2 Q	—		4:47.6	5

== See also ==
- Great Britain at the 1960 Summer Paralympics
