= Great Britain at the 1956 Summer Olympics =

- Flag of the United Kingdom
- IOC code: GBR (GRB used at these Games)
- NOC: British Olympic Association

in Melbourne/Stockholm
- Competitors: 189 (163 men and 26 women) in 17 sports
- Flag bearer: George Mackenzie
- Medals Ranked 8th: Gold 6 Silver 7 Bronze 11 Total 24

Summer Olympics appearances (overview)
- 1896; 1900; 1904; 1908; 1912; 1920; 1924; 1928; 1932; 1936; 1948; 1952; 1956; 1960; 1964; 1968; 1972; 1976; 1980; 1984; 1988; 1992; 1996; 2000; 2004; 2008; 2012; 2016; 2020; 2024; 2028

Other related appearances
- 1906 Intercalated Games

Great Britain, represented by the British Olympic Association (BOA), competed at the 1956 Summer Olympics in Melbourne, Australia. British athletes have competed in every Summer Olympic Games. 189 competitors, 163 men and 26 women, took part in 108 events in 17 sports.

The Melbourne Games saw an improvement on Great Britain and Northern Ireland's performance at the two preceding Games. British athletes won six gold medals (up from just one in 1952). Overall, they won twenty-four medals, finishing eighth.

== Medallists ==
Medals by sport
Sport	Gold medal	Silver medal	Bronze medal	Total
Boxing	2	1	2	5
Athletics	1	4	2	7
Equestrian	1	0	2	3
Swimming	1	0	1	2
Fencing	1	0	0	1
Cycling	0	1	2	3
Sailing	0	1	2	3
Total	6	7	11	24

=== Gold ===
- Chris Brasher — Athletics, Men's 3.000m Steeplechase
- Terence Spinks — Boxing, Men's Flyweight
- Richard McTaggart — Boxing, Men's Lightweight
- Bertie Hill, Arthur Rook, and Francis Weldon — Equestrian, Three-Day Event Team
- Gillian Sheen — Fencing, Women's Foil Individual
- Judy Grinham — Swimming, Women's 100m Backstroke

=== Silver ===
- Derek Johnson — Athletics, Men's 800m
- Gordon Pirie — Athletics, Men's 5.000m
- Jean Scrivens, Heather Armitage, June Foulds, and Anne Pashley — Athletics, Women's 4 × 100 m Relay
- Thelma Hopkins — Athletics, Women's High Jump
- Thomas Nicholls — Boxing, Men's Featherweight
- Arthur Brittain, William Holmes, and Alan Jackson — Cycling, Men's Team Road Race
- Robert Perry, David Bowker, John Dillon, and Neil Kennedy-Cochran — Sailing, Men's 5½ Meter Classo

=== Bronze ===
- Derek Ibbotson — Athletics, Men's 5.000m
- Michael Wheeler, Peter Higgins, Derek Johnson, and John Salisbury — Athletics, Men's 4 × 400 m Relay
- Nicholas Gargano — Boxing, Men's Welterweight
- John McCormack — Boxing, Men's Light Middleweight
- Tom Simpson, Donald Burgess, Michael Gambrill, and John Geddes — Cycling, Men's 4.000m Team Pursuit
- Alan Jackson — Cycling, Men's Individual Road Race
- Francis Weldon — Equestrian, Three-Day Event Individual
- Peter Robeson, Pat Smythe, and Wilf White — Equestrian, Jumping Team
- Margaret Edwards — Swimming, Women's 100m Backstroke
- Terence Smith and Jasper Blackall — Sailing, Men's Sharpie 12m²
- Graham Mann, Ronald Backus, and Jonathan Janson — Sailing, Men's Dragon

== Athletics ==
Men's 110m Hurdles

- Peter Hildreth

- Heat — 14.5s (→ did not advance)

- Jack Parker

- Heat — 14.8s (→ did not advance)

Men's 1500m

- Brian Hewson

- Final— 3:42.6 (→ 5th place)

- Ian Boyd

- Final— 3:43.0 (→ 8th place)

- Ken Wood

- Final— 3:44.76 (→ 9th place)

Men's Marathon

- Harry Hicks — 2:39:55 (→ 15th place)
- Fred Norris — did not finish (→ no ranking)
- Ron Clark — did not finish (→ no ranking)

Women's Discus Throw

- Suzanne Allday

- Qualifying Round — 41.45 m (→ did not advance, 14th place)

== Boxing ==
Men's Light Flyweight (– 48 kg)

- Owen Reilly

Men's Flyweight (– 51 kg)

- Terence Spinks

Men's Bantamweight (– 54 kg)

- Thomas Nicholls

Men's Featherweight (– 57 kg)

- Richard McTaggart

Men's Light Welterweight (– 63.5 kg)

- Nicholas Gargano

Men's Light Middleweight (– 67 kg)

- John McCormack

Men's Middleweight (– 75 kg)

- Ron Redrup

== Cycling ==
Benny Foster was the British cycling team manager.

Sprint

- Keith Harrison — 15th place

Time trial

- Alan Danson — 1:12.3 (→ 5th place)

Tandem

- Eric Thompson
  Peter Brotherton — 4th place

Team pursuit

- Donald Burgess
  John Geddes
  Michael Gambrill
  Tom Simpson — 4:42.2 (→ Bronze Medal)

Team road race

- Alan Jackson
  Arthur Brittain
  William Holmes — 23 points (→ Silver Medal)

Individual road race

- Alan Jackson — 5:23:16 (→ Bronze Medal)
- Arthur Brittain — 5:23:40 (→ 6th place)
- William Holmes — 5:23:40 (→ 14th place)
- Harold Reynolds — 5:24:44 (→ 19th place)

== Diving ==
Men

Athlete	Event	Preliminary		Final			
Athlete	Event	Points	Rank	Points	Rank	Total	Rank
Ray Cann	3 m springboard	67.96	21	Did not advance			
Peter Tarsey	3 m springboard	72.65	16	Did not advance			
Roy Walsh	3 m springboard	58.21	24	Did not advance			
Ray Cann	10 m platform	60.08	21	Did not advance			
Peter Tarsey	10 m platform	68.34	14	Did not advance			
Roy Walsh	10 m platform	62.56	20	Did not advance			

Women

Athlete	Event	Preliminary		Final			
Athlete	Event	Points	Rank	Points	Rank	Total	Rank
Ann Long	3 m springboard	63.23	7 Q	44.38	7	107.61	6
Charmain Welsh	3 m springboard	59.45	14	Did not advance			
Ann Long	10 m platform	49.15	9 Q	27.00	6	76.15	7
Charmain Welsh	10 m platform	46.55	11 Q	22.50	10	69.05	12

== Fencing ==
Nine fencers, seven men and two women, represented Great Britain in 1956.

Men's foil

- Allan Jay
- Raymond Paul
- René Paul

Men's team foil

- René Paul, Bill Hoskyns, Raymond Paul, Allan Jay, Ralph Cooperman

Men's épée

- Bill Hoskyns
- Allan Jay
- Michael Howard

Men's team épée

- René Paul, Raymond Paul, Michael Howard, Bill Hoskyns, Allan Jay

Men's sabre

- Olgierd Porebski
- Ralph Cooperman
- Bill Hoskyns

Men's team sabre

- Olgierd Porebski, Bill Hoskyns, Ralph Cooperman, Allan Jay, Raymond Paul

Women's foil

- Gillian Sheen
- Mary Glen-Haig

== Gymnastics ==
The British Gymnastics team competed in 15 events, and was made up of 14 gymnasts, (6 men and 8 women), including Frank Turner, competing in his third Summer Olympics.

== Modern pentathlon ==
Three male pentathletes represented Great Britain in 1956.

Individual

- Donald Cobley
- Thomas Hudson
- George Norman

Team

- Donald Cobley
- Thomas Hudson
- George Norman

== Rowing ==
Great Britain had 12 male rowers participate in three out of seven rowing events in 1956.

Men's single sculls - unplaced

- Tony Fox

Men's double sculls - unplaced

- Sidney Rand
- Bill Rand

Men's eight

- Richard Wheadon
- Michael Delahooke
- Ian Welsh
- Kenneth Masser
- Simon Tozer
- Alan Watson
- John A. Russell
- Christopher Davidge
- John Hinde (cox)

== Shooting ==
Six shooters represented Great Britain in 1956.

25 m pistol

- Henry Steele
- Frederick Cooper

50 m pistol

- Frederick Cooper
- Henry Steele

300 m rifle, three positions

- Steffen Cranmer

50 m rifle, three positions

- Steffen Cranmer
- Frederick Hopkinson

50 m rifle, prone

- Steffen Cranmer
- Frederick Hopkinson

Trap

- Joe Wheater
- Ernest Fear

== Swimming ==
Men

Athlete	Event	Heat		Semifinal		Final	
Athlete	Event	Time	Rank	Time	Rank	Time	Rank
Ronald Roberts	100 m freestyle	58.3	=10 Q	58.9	15	Did not advance	
Kenneth Williams	100 m freestyle	59.4	19	Did not advance			
Neil McKechnie	400 m freestyle	4:42.6	15	—N/a		Did not advance	
Jack Wardrop	400 m freestyle	4:39.8	11	—N/a		Did not advance	
John Brockway	1500 m freestyle	1:07.7	19	Did not advance			
Haydn Rigby	1500 m freestyle	1:06.9	=14 Q	1:07.6	13	Did not advance	
Graham Sykes	1500 m freestyle	1:06.2	=8 Q	1:06.5	8 Q	1:05.6	6
Christopher Walkden	200 m breaststroke	2:47.1	11	—N/a		Did not advance	
Graham Symonds	200 m butterfly	2:35.7	12	—N/a		Did not advance	
Kenneth Williams; Ronald Roberts; Neil McKechnie; Jack Wardrop	4 × 200 m freestyle	8:39.1	3 Q	—N/a		8:45.2	6

Women

Athlete	Event	Heat		Semifinal		Final	
Athlete	Event	Time	Rank	Time	Rank	Time	Rank
Fearne Ewart	100 m freestyle	1:08.8	=23	Did not advance			
Frances Hogben	100 m freestyle	1:08.5	=20	Did not advance			
Margaret Girvan	400 m freestyle	5:23.6	16	—N/a		Did not advance	
Margaret Edwards	100 m backstroke	1:13.0	1 Q	—N/a		1:13.1	3rd place, bronze medalist(s)
Judy Grinham	100 m backstroke	1:13.1	2 Q	—N/a		1:12.9 WR	1st place, gold medalist(s)
Julie Hoyle	100 m backstroke	1:15.0	8 Q	—N/a		1:14.3	6
Elenor Gordon	200 m breaststroke	2:55.4	3 Q	—N/a		2:56.1	6
Christine Gosden	200 m breaststroke	2:58.2	=7 Q	—N/a		2:59.2	8
Anne Morton	100 m butterfly	1:17.7	=9	—N/a		Did not advance	
Frances Hogben; Judy Grinham; Margaret Girvan; Fearne Ewart	4 × 100 m freestyle	4:34.6	8 Q	—N/a		4:35.8	8
