= Aquatics at the 1958 British Empire and Commonwealth Games =

- Venue: Empire Pool
- Location: Wood Street, Cardiff, Wales
- Dates: 18 to 26 July 1958

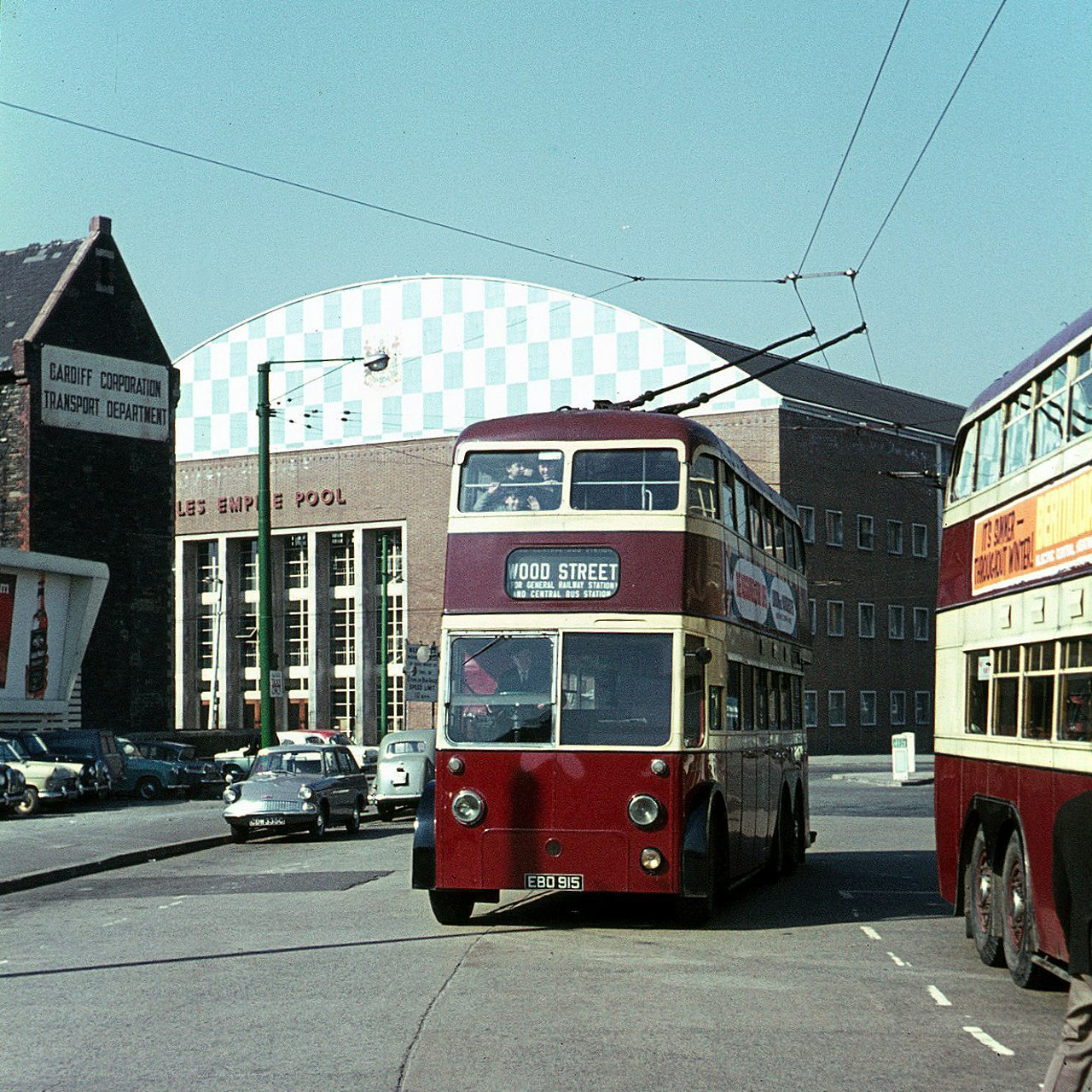
The Empire Pool building in 1966 Attribution:Alan Murray-Rust

Aquatics at the 1958 British Empire and Commonwealth Games made its sixth appearance at the Commonwealth Games, with both Swimming at the Commonwealth Games and Diving at the Commonwealth Games being included again.

There were four diving events and 15 swimming events contested.

The Empire Pool had been specifically built for the Games and opened on 18 April 1958. It cost £650,000 to build and had space for 1772 spectators.

Australia topped the medal table with seven gold medals.

== Medal table ==
* Host nation (Wales)

Medals won by nation with totals, ranked by number of golds—sortable
Rank	Nation	Gold	Silver	Bronze	Total
1	Australia	11	6	5	22
2	England	6	5	8	19
3	Scotland	2	2	0	4
4	Canada	0	4	4	8
5	New Zealand	0	1	1	2
5	South Africa	0	1	1	2
Totals (6 entries)		19	19	19	57

== Medal winners ==
=== Diving ===
Event	Gold	Silver	Bronze
3m springboard (m)	Keith Collin (ENG)	Bill Patrick (CAN)	Peter Tarsey (ENG)
10m platform (m)	Peter Heatly (SCO)	Brian Phelps (ENG)	Ray Cann (ENG)
3m Springboard (w)	Charmain Welsh (ENG)	Irene MacDonald (CAN)	Liz Ferris (ENG)
10m platform (w)	Charmain Welsh (ENG)	Ann Long (ENG)	Molly Wieland (ENG)

=== Swimming ===
Men's events

Event	Gold	Silver	Bronze
110 yd freestyle	John Devitt (AUS)	Gary Chapman (AUS)	Geoff Shipton (AUS)
440 yd freestyle	John Konrads (AUS)	Ian Black (SCO)	Gary Winram (AUS)
1650 yd freestyle	John Konrads (AUS)	Gary Winram (AUS)	Murray McLachlan (SAF)
110 yd backstroke	John Monckton (AUS)	John Hayres (AUS)	Bob Wheaton (CAN)
220 yd breaststroke	Terry Gathercole (AUS)	Peter Rocchi (SAF)	Chris Walkden (ENG)
220 yd butterfly	Ian Black (SCO)	Graham Symonds (ENG)	Brian Wilkinson (AUS)
4×220 yd freestyle relay	Australia (AUS); Gary Chapman; Brian Wilkinson; John Konrads; John Devitt	Scotland (SCO); Athole Still; Ian Black; James Leiper; Bob Sreenan	Canada (CAN); Kenneth Williams; Peter Bell; Cam Grout; Bill Slater
4×110 yd medley relay	Australia (AUS); Gary Chapman; John Monckton; John Devitt; Terry Gathercole	Canada (CAN); George Park; Kenneth Williams; Peter Bell; Bob Wheaton	England (ENG); Christopher Walkden; Graham Sykes; Graham Symonds; Neil McKechnie

Women's events

Event	Gold	Silver	Bronze
110 yd freestyle	Dawn Fraser (AUS)	Lorraine Crapp (AUS)	Alva Colquhoun (AUS)
440 yd freestyle	Ilsa Konrads (AUS)	Dawn Fraser (AUS)	Lorraine Crapp (AUS)
110 yd backstroke	Judy Grinham (ENG)	Margaret Edwards (ENG)	Philippa Gould (NZL)
220 yd breaststroke	Anita Lonsbrough (ENG)	Jackie Dyson (ENG)	Christine Gosden (ENG)
110 yd butterfly	Beverley Bainbridge (AUS)	Tessa Staveley (NZL)	Margaret Iwasaki (CAN)
4×110 yd freestyle relay	Australia (AUS); Alva Colquhoun; Dawn Fraser; Lorraine Crapp; Sandra Morgan	Canada (CAN); Gladys Priestley; Margaret Iwasaki; Susan Sangster; Sara Barber	England (ENG); Beryl Noakes; Diana Wilkinson; Judy Grinham; Anne Marshall
4×110 yd medley relay	England (ENG); Judy Grinham; Anita Lonsbrough; Christine Gosden; Diana Wilkinson	Australia (AUS); Alva Colquhoun; Barbara Evans; Beverley Bainbridge; Gergaynia Beckett	Canada (CAN); Gladys Priestley; Irene Service; Margaret Iwasaki; Sara Barber

== Finals (men) ==
=== 3m springboard ===
Pos	Athlete	Pts
1	(England) Keith Collin	126.78
2	(Canada) Bill Patrick	124.62
3	(England) Peter Tarsey	118.81
4	(England) Peter Squires	114.06
5	(South Africa) Tut Marwick	106.06
6	(New Zealand) Len Hodge	104.87
7	(Scotland) Bill Law	96.31
8	(Scotland) Brian Davidson	90.79
9	(Wales) Alan Roberts	76.62

=== 10m Platform ===
Pos	Athlete	Pts
1	(Scotland) Peter Heatly	147.79
2	(England) Brian Phelps	144.49
3	(England) Ray Cann	138.5
4	(England) Peter Tarsey	124.94
5	(Scotland) Brian Davidson	113.53
6	(Scotland) Bill Law	98.18
7	(Wales) Syd Lingard	71.76

=== 110y freestyle ===
Pos	Athlete	Time
1	(Australia) John Devitt	56.6
2	(Australia) Gary Chapman	56.6
3	(Australia) Geoff Shipton	57.0
4	(Canada) Cam Grout	58.5
5	(South Africa) Aubrey Bürer	58.7
6	(England) Neil McKechnie	59.2

=== 440y freestyle ===
Pos	Athlete	Time
1	(Australia) John Konrads	4:25.9
2	(Scotland) Ian Black	4:28.5
3	(Australia) Gary Winram	4:32.4
4	(South Africa) Murray McLachlan	4:37.6
5	(Australia) Gary Chapman	4:42.5
6	(South Africa) Aubrey Bürer	4:45.6

=== 1650y freestyle ===
Pos	Athlete	Time
1	(Australia) John Konrads	17:45.4
2	(Australia) Gary Winram	18:17.2
3	(South Africa) Murray McLachlan	18:19.2
4	(Canada) Bill Slater	18:51.4
5	(Scotland) Bob Sreenan	18:55.8

=== 110y backstroke ===
Pos	Athlete	Time
1	(Australia) John Monckton	1:01.7
2	(Australia) John Hayres	1:03.5
3	(Canada) Bob Wheaton	1:06.5
4	(England) Haydn Rigby	1:07.9
5	(England) Graham Sykes	1:07.9
6	(Wales) John Brockway	1:08.4

=== 220y breaststroke ===
Pos	Athlete	Time
1	(Australia) Terry Gathercole	2:41.6
2	(South Africa) Peter Rocchi	2:44.9
3	(England) Chris Walkden	2:47.3
4	(England) Richard Hemingway	2:50.1
5	(Wales) John Beavan	2:50.9
6	(Wales) Hugh Jenkins	2:55.3

=== 220y butterfly ===
Pos	Athlete	Time
1	(Scotland) Ian Black	2:22.6
2	(England) Graham Symonds	2:25.5
3	(Australia) Brian Wilkinson	2:31.0
4	(Canada) Cam Grout	2:34.9
5	(England) Richard Campion	2:37.4
6	(South Africa) Meyer Feldberg	2:38.7

=== 4x220y freestyle relay ===
Pos	Athlete	Time
1	(Australia) Chapman, Wilkinson, Konrads, Devitt	8:33.4
2	(Scotland) Still, Black, Leiper, Sreenan	8:54.2
3	(Canada) Williams, Bell, Grout, Slater	9:01.8
4	(England) Barnes, Clarke, McKechnie, Symonds	9:05.5
5	(Wales) Edwards, Flook, Morgan, Glasenbury	9:46.4

=== 4x110y medley relay ===
Pos	Athlete	Time
1	(Australia) Chapman, Monckton, Devitt, Gathercole	4:14.2 (WR)
2	(Canada) Park, Williams, Bell, Wheaton	4:26.3
3	(England) Walkden, Sykes, Symonds, McKechnie	4:26.4
4	(South Africa) Bürer, Rocchi, Feldberg, McLachlan	4:35.0
5	(Scotland) Still, Hill, Black, Percy-Robb	4:36.2
6	(Wales) Brockway, Beavan, Evans, Newman	4:52.9

== Finals (women) ==
=== 3m springboard ===
Pos	Athlete	Pts
1	(England) Charmain Welsh	118.8
2	(Canada) Irene MacDonald	117.0
3	(England) Liz Ferris	113.3
4	(England) Ann Long	108.5
5	(Southern Rhodesia) Sandra Morgenrood	88.78
6	(Scotland) Valerie Marrian	84.74

=== 10m Platform ===
Pos	Athlete	Pts
1	(England) Charmain Welsh	77.23
2	(England) Ann Long	73.69
3	(England) Molly Wieland	65.82
4	(Canada) Irene MacDonald	65.15
5	(Southern Rhodesia) Sandra Morgenrood	

=== 110y freestyle ===
Pos	Athlete	Time
1	(Australia) Dawn Fraser	1:01.4
2	(Australia) Lorraine Crapp	1:03.8
3	(Australia) Alva Colquhoun	1:04.0
4	(England) Diana Wilkinson	1:05.8
5	(South Africa) Natalie Myburgh	1:07.1
6	(Canada) Margaret Iwasaki	1:07.5

=== 440y freestyle ===
Pos	Athlete	Time
1	(Australia) Ilsa Konrads	4:49.4
2	(Australia) Dawn Fraser	5:00.8
3	(Australia) Lorraine Crapp	:06.7
4	(England) Elspeth Ferguson	5:15.2
5	(Scotland) Nan Rae	5:16.3
6	(England) Diana Wilkinson	5:21.3

=== 110y backstroke ===
Pos	Athlete	Time
1	(England) Judy Grinham	1:11.9
2	(England) Margaret Edwards	1:12.6
3	(New Zealand) Philippa Gould	1:13.7
4	(Canada) Sara Barber	1:15.4
5	(Australia) Anne Margaret Nelson	1:15.5
6	(Australia) Gergaynia Beckett	1:16.3

=== 220y breaststroke ===
Pos	Athlete	Time
1	(England) Anita Lonsbrough	2:53.5
2	(England) Jackie Dyson	2:58.2
3	(England) Christine Gosden	2:58.4
4	(Canada) Irene Service	3:01.3
5	(Australia) Barbara Evans	3:01.9
6	(Scotland) Alison Turnbull	3:08.7

=== 110y butterfly ===
Pos	Athlete	Time
1	(Australia) Beverley Bainbridge	1:13.5
2	(New Zealand) Tessa Staveley	1:14.4
3	(Canada) Margaret Iwasaki	1:15.9
4	(England) Christine Gosden	1:16.4
5	(England) Jean Oldroyd	1:16.8
6	(Scotland) Sheila Watt	1:17.1

=== 4×110y freestyle relay ===
Pos	Athlete	Time
1	(Australia) Colquhoun, Fraser, Crapp, Morgan	4:17.4
2	(Canada) Priestley, Iwasaki, Sangster, Barber	4:30.0
3	(England) Noakes, Wilkinson, Grinham, Marshall	4:31.5
4	(South Africa) Hogg, Wetton, Roberts, Myburgh	4:37.3
5	(Scotland) Gunn, Girvan, Harris, Hogben	4:44.1
6	(Wales) Francis, Hooper, Howells, Townsend	5:02.4

=== 4×110y medley relay ===
Pos	Athlete	Time
1	(England) Grinham, Lonsbrough, Gosden, Wilkinson	4:54.0
2	(Australia) Colquhoun, Evans, Bainbridge, Beckett	4:55.1
3	(Canada) Priestley, Service, Iwasaki, Barber	5:01.6
4	(New Zealand) Gould, Staveley, Sawyers, Hunter	5:06.4
5	(South Africa) Wetton, Rocchi, Roberts, Myburgh	5:11.6
6	(Wales) Francis, Hooper, Howells, Davies, Dixon	5:24.3
