= Australia at the 1958 British Empire and Commonwealth Games =

Australia at the 1958 British Empire Games
- CG code: AUS
- CGA: Australian Commonwealth Games Association

in Cardiff, Wales
- Competitors: 105 in 10 sports
- Flag bearers: Opening: Ivan Lund; Closing: n/a
- Officials: 14
- Medals Ranked 2nd: Gold 27 Silver 22 Bronze 17 Total 66

British Empire Games appearances
- 1930; 1934; 1938; 1950; 1954; 1958; 1962; 1966; 1970; 1974; 1978; 1982; 1986; 1990; 1994; 1998; 2002; 2006; 2010; 2014; 2018; 2022; 2026; 2030

Australia competed at the 1958 British Empire and Commonwealth Games in Cardiff, Wales, from 18 to 26 July 1958. It was Australia's sixth appearance at the Commonwealth Games, having competed at every Games since their inception in 1930.

Australia won medals in eight of the ten sports that it entered.

== Medallists ==
The following Australian competitors won medals at the games.

Medal	Name	Sport	Event
Gold	Herb Elliott	Athletics	Men's 880 yards
Gold	Herb Elliott	Athletics	Men's 1 mile
Gold	Dave Power	Athletics	Men's 6 miles
Gold	Dave Power	Athletics	Men's Marathon
Gold	Ian Tomlinson	Athletics	Men's triple jump
Gold	Marlene Willard	Athletics	Women's 100 yards
Gold	Marlene Willard	Athletics	Women's 220 yards
Gold	Norma Thrower	Athletics	Women's 80 metres hurdles
Gold	Michele Mason	Athletics	Women's high jump
Gold	Anna Pazera	Athletics	Women's javelin throw
Gold	Wally Taylor	Boxing	Men's Featherweight
Gold	Tony Madigan	Boxing	Men's Light Heavyweight
Gold	Dick Ploog	Cycling	Men's Sprint
Gold	Ian Browne	Cycling	Men's 10 Miles Scratch
Gold	Stuart Mackenzie	Rowing	Men's Single Scull
Gold	John Devitt	Swimming	Men's 110 yards Freestyle
Gold	John Konrads	Swimming	Men's 440 yards Freestyle
Gold	John Konrads	Swimming	Men's 1650 yards Freestyle
Gold	John Monckton	Swimming	Men's 110 yards Backstroke
Gold	Terry Gathercole	Swimming	Men's 220 yards Breaststroke
Gold	Gary Chapman; Brian Wilkinson; John Konrads; John Devitt	Swimming	Men's 4 × 220 yards Freestyle Relay
Gold	Gary Chapman; John Monckton; John Devitt; Terry Gathercole	Swimming	Men's 4 × 110 yards Medley Relay
Gold	Dawn Fraser	Swimming	Women's 110 yards Freestyle
Gold	Ilsa Konrads	Swimming	Women's 440 yards Freestyle
Gold	Beverley Bainbridge	Swimming	Women's 110 yards Butterfly
Gold	Alva Colquhoun; Dawn Fraser; Lorraine Crapp; Sandra Morgan	Swimming	Women's 4 × 110 yards Freestyle Relay
Gold	Manny Santos	Weightlifting	Men's Middle Heavyweight
Silver	Merv Lincoln	Athletics	Men's 1 mile
Silver	Albie Thomas	Athletics	Men's 3 miles
Silver	David Lean	Athletics	Men's 440 yards hurdles
Silver	Chilla Porter	Athletics	Men's high jump
Silver	Betty Cuthbert	Athletics	Women's 220 yards
Silver	Betty Cuthbert; Kay Johnson; Wendy Hayes; Marlene Willard	Athletics	Women's 4 × 110 yards relay
Silver	Oliver Taylor	Boxing	Men's Bantamweight
Silver	Warren Scarfe	Cycling	Men's Time Trial
Silver	Frank Brazier	Cycling	Men's Road Race
Silver	Ivan Lund	Fencing	Men's Foil
Silver	Brian McCowage; Michael Sichel; Ivan Lund	Fencing	Men's Foil Team
Silver	Alexander Martonffy; Ivan Lund; Michael Sichel	Fencing	Men's Sabre Team
Silver	Barbara McCreath	Fencing	Women's Foil
Silver	Mervyn Wood; Stuart Mackenzie	Rowing	Men's Double Scull
Silver	Bruce Evans, Mick Allan, Kenneth Railton, Kevin Evans, Lionel Robberds; Neville Clinton, Ralfe Currall, Peter Waddington, Victor Schweikert	Rowing	Men's Eight
Silver	Gary Chapman	Swimming	Men's 110 yards Freestyle
Silver	Gary Winram	Swimming	Men's 1650 yards Freestyle
Silver	John Hayres	Swimming	Men's 110 yards Backstroke
Silver	Lorraine Crapp	Swimming	Women's 110 yards Freestyle
Silver	Dawn Fraser	Swimming	Women's 440 yards Freestyle
Silver	Alva Colquhoun; Barbara Evans; Anne Nelson; Gergaynia Beckett	Swimming	Women's 4 × 110 yards Medley Relay
Silver	Geoff Jameson	Wrestling	Men's Bantamweight
Bronze	Albie Thomas	Athletics	Men's 1 mile
Bronze	Jim McCann; Hector Hogan; Terry Gale; Kevan Gosper	Athletics	Men's 4 × 110 yards relay
Bronze	Barry Donath	Athletics	Men's shot put
Bronze	Gloria Wigney	Athletics	Women's 80 metres hurdles
Bronze	Helen Frith	Athletics	Women's high jump
Bronze	Bev Watson	Athletics	Women's long jump
Bronze	David Francis Doyle; Ivan Lund; John Simpson	Fencing	Men's Épée Team
Bronze	Stephen Roll; Kevyn Webb	Rowing	Men's Coxless Pair
Bronze	Mick Allen; Ralfe Currall; Kevin Evans; Lionel Robberds; Roland Waddington	Rowing	Men's Coxed Four
Bronze	Geoff Shipton	Swimming	Men's 110 yards Freestyle
Bronze	Gary Winram	Swimming	Men's 440 yards Freestyle
Bronze	Brian Wilkinson	Swimming	Men's 220 yards Butterfly
Bronze	Alva Colquhoun	Swimming	Women's 110 yards Freestyle
Bronze	Lorraine Crapp	Swimming	Women's 440 yards Freestyle
Bronze	Leonard Treganowan	Weightlifting	Men's Middle Heavyweight
Bronze	Arthur Shannos	Weightlifting	Men's Heavyweight
Bronze	Ray Mitchell	Wrestling	Men's Heavyweight

Medals by sport
Sport	1st place, gold medalist(s)	2nd place, silver medalist(s)	3rd place, bronze medalist(s)	
Swimming	11	6	5	22
Athletics	10	6	6	22
Cycling	2	2	0	4
Boxing	2	1	0	3
Rowing	1	2	2	5
Weightlifting	1	0	2	3
Fencing	0	4	1	5
Wrestling	0	1	1	2
Total	27	22	17	66

== Officials ==
Chief of Mission / Honorary Treasurer: Jim Eve
Honorary General Manager: Bill Young
Attache: Max Phillips
Section Officials: Athletics Manager – Charles Gardner; Lawn Bowls Manager – Neil Benjamin; Boxing Manager – John Castle; Cycling Manager – Ronald O'Donnell; Fencing Manager – Vivian Chalwin; Rowing Manager – Eric Holford, Rowing Coach – Eric Longley; Swimming Manager – Allan Blue, Swimming Chaperon – Frances May; Wrestling Manager – Dick Garrard

== See also ==
- Australia at the 1956 Summer Olympics
- Australia at the 1960 Summer Olympics
