= British Diving Championships – plain diving winners =

British diving competition

The British Diving Championships - plain diving winners formerly the (Amateur Swimming Association (ASA) National Championships) are listed below.

== Plain diving champions ==
Year	Men's champion	Women's champion
1953	Peter Elliott	Charmain Welsh
1954	Peter Tarsey	Ann Long
1955	Peter Squires	Ann Long
1956	Peter Squires	Charmain Welsh
1957	Brian Phelps	Charmain Welsh
1958	Keith Collin	Ann Long
1959	Peter Squires	Elizabeth Ferris
1960	Brian Phelps	Elizabeth Ferris
1961	Brian Phelps	Margaret Austen

== See also ==
- British Swimming
