= Betty Gunn =

Scottish swimmer

Personal information
- Nationality: British (Scotland)
- Born: c.1937 Scotland

Sport
- Sport: Swimming
- Event: Freestyle
- Club: Thistle SC, Aberdeen

Betty S. Gunn (born c.1937) is a former swimmer from Scotland, who represented Scotland at the British Empire and Commonwealth Games (now Commonwealth Games).

== Biography ==
Gunn was a member of the Thistle Swimming Club in Aberdeen. In 1957 she lived at Craigievar Crescent and was a short-hand typist by profession and competed in the Youth Festival of Sport in Moscow.

She represented the 1958 Scottish swimming team at the 1958 British Empire and Commonwealth Games in Cardiff, Wales, participating in the 110 yards freestyle event and the medley relay, finishing fifth with Margaret Girvan, Christine Harris and Frances Hogben.

In 1960 she earned the Scottish Swimming Teachers'Certificate and was coached by Andy Robb. In 1961 she won the Strachan plaque.
