= Malcolm Barnes =

English swimmer

Personal information
- Nickname: Wally
- Nationality: British (English)
- Born: 1941 Loughborough, England
- Education: Highbury County Grammar, North London

Sport
- Sport: Swimming
- Club: Stoke Newington SC

Malcolm E. Barnes is a former swimmer who competed for England at the Commonwealth Games.

== Biography ==
In May 1958 he took part in the Empire Games trials in Blackpool and subsequently represented the English team at the 1958 British Empire and Commonwealth Games in Cardiff, Wales. He competed in the 440 yards freestyle event and helped England secure a fourth place finish in the final of the men's 4 x 220 yards freestyle relay, with Stanley Clarke, Neil McKechnie and Graham Symonds.

He was a member of the Stoke Newington Swimming Club.
