= Jackie Dyson =

English swimmer (born 1943)

Personal information
- Nationality: British (English)
- Born: 1943 (age 82–83) Surrey, England

Sport
- Sport: Swimming
- Event: Breaststroke
- Club: Kingston Ladies
Medal record
Swimming
Representing England
British Empire & Commonwealth Games
Silver medal – second place	1958 Cardiff	220y breaststroke

Jacqueline Dyson (born 1943), is a female former swimmer who competed for England.

== Biography ==
In May 1958 she took part in the Empire Games trials in Blackpool and subsequently represented the English team at the 1958 British Empire and Commonwealth Games in Cardiff, Wales, where she competed in the 220 yards breaststroke event.

She was a 15-year-old pupil of Bonner Hill School when selected for the Games and swam for Kingston Ladies.

In 1961 Dyson was bridesmaid at the wedding of international swimmers Jim Hill and Anne Marshall.
