= Stanley Clarke (swimmer) =

English swimmer (1938–2018)

Personal information
- Full name: Stanley Robert Clarke
- Nationality: British (English)
- Born: 31 July 1938 London, England
- Died: 14 March 2018 (aged 79)
- Height: 1.83 m (6 ft 0 in)
- Weight: 89 kg (196 lb; 14.0 st)

Sport
- Sport: Swimming
- Strokes: Freestyle
- Club: Plaistow United
Medal record
Men's swimming
Representing Great Britain
European Championships
Silver medal – second place	1962 Leipzig	4×100 m freestyle
Representing England
Commonwealth Games
Bronze medal – third place	1962 Perth	4×110 yd freestyle
Bronze medal – third place	1962 Perth	4×220 yd freestyle

Stanley Robert Clarke (31 July 1938 – 14 March 2018) was an English competition swimmer.

== Biography ==
Clarke swam for Great Britain in the Olympics and European championships. Clarke won a silver medal in the 4 × 100 m freestyle relay at the 1962 European Aquatics Championships. He finished seventh in the same event at the 1960 Summer Olympics.

In May 1958 he took part in the Empire Games trials in Blackpool and subsequently represented the English team at the 1958 British Empire and Commonwealth Games in Cardiff, Wales. He competed in the 110 yards freestyle, event and helped England secure a fourth place finish in the final of the men's 4 × 220 yards freestyle relay, with Malcolm Barnes, Neil McKechnie and Graham Symonds. Four years later he won double bronze at the 1962 British Empire and Commonwealth Games in Perth, Western Australia.

In October 1958 he finished second to Bob Sreenan the 400 yards Bologna Trophy but was disqualified for touching the end rail which the organisers had forgotten to remove.

He also won the 1960 ASA National Championship 100 metres freestyle title and the 200 metres freestyle. As of 2012, he was still competing and winning national titles in the masters category.

== See also ==
- List of Commonwealth Games medallists in swimming (men)
