= Iain Percy-Robb =

Scottish swimmer

Personal information
- Nationality: British (Scotland)
- Born: 8 December 1935 Glasgow, Scotland
- Died: 11 February 2014 (aged 78) Peebles, Scotland

Sport
- Sport: Swimming
- Event: Breaststroke
- Club: Warrender Baths, Edinburgh

Iain Walter Percy-Robb (8 December 1935 – 11 February 2014) was a swimmer from Scotland, who represented Scotland at the British Empire and Commonwealth Games (now Commonwealth Games).

== Biography ==
Percy-Robb was a member of the Warrender Baths in Edinburgh and studied medicine at the University of Edinburgh. He was short listed for the 1956 Summer Olympics

In August 1957 he represented Scotland at the Festival of Youth Games in Moscow and also swam for the University of Edinburgh swimming team, winning the 1956 British Universities 200 yards breaststroke title and the 220 yards breaststroke at the 1958 Scottish Inter-Universities meet. He was the 1958 Scottish breaststroke champion.

He represented the 1958 Scottish swimming team at the 1958 British Empire and Commonwealth Games in Cardiff, Wales, participating in the 220y breaststroke event and the 4 x 110 yards medley relay, finishing fifth with Athole Still, Jim Hill and Ian Black.

In 1984, he was appointed as Professor (personal chair) and Head of Department at the University of Glasgow.
