= Michael Strauss =

Michael Strauss or Michael Straus may refer to:

- Michael Straus (1929–1977), British fencer
- Michael Strauss (industrialist) (1934–2020), Israeli industrialist

== See also ==
- Michael W. Straus (1897–1970), commissioner of the United States Bureau of Reclamation
