= Donald Stringer =

Donald Stringer may refer to:

- Donald Stringer (canoeist) (1933–1978), Canadian Olympic canoer
- Donald Stringer (fencer) (born 1928), British Olympic fencer
