= Jim Hill (swimmer) =

Scottish swimmer

Personal information
- Nationality: British (Scotland)
- Born: Scotland

Sport
- Sport: Swimming
- Event(s): Backstroke, Freestyle
- Club: University of Edinburgh; Warrender Baths, Edinburgh

James C. M. Hill is a former swimmer from Scotland, who represented Scotland at the British Empire and Commonwealth Games (now Commonwealth Games).

== Biography ==
Hill was a member of the Warrender Baths in Edinburgh.

In August 1957 he represented Scotland at the Festival of Youth Games in Moscow and swam for the University of Edinburgh. He was the 1958 Scottish backstroke champion.

He represented the 1958 Scottish swimming team at the 1958 British Empire and Commonwealth Games in Cardiff, Wales, participating in the 110 yards backstroke event and the 4 x 110 yards medley relay, finishing fifth, with Athole Still, Ian Black and Iain Percy-Robb.

In 1961, he was secretary of the Warrender Club. and married fellow international swimmer Anne Marshall in Surrey.
