= Richard Evans (swimmer) =

British swimmer

Personal information
- Nationality: British (Welsh)
- Born: Q3. 1939 Newport, Wales

Sport
- Sport: Swimming
- Event: Butterfly
- Club: Newport SC

Richard A. Evans (born 1939) is a former Welsh swimmer who specialised in butterfly and competed at the Commonwealth Games.

== Biography ==
Evans born in Newport, attended Newport High School and while a pupil at the school became the Welsh 220 yards butterfly champion. He was a member of the Newport Swimming Club and won the national butterfly title at the recently opened Wales Empire Pool.

He represented the Welsh team at the 1958 British Empire and Commonwealth Games in Cardiff, Wales, where he competed in the 220 yards butterfly and helped Wales secure a sixth place finish in the final of the men's 110 yards medley relay, with John Brockway, John Beavan and Bernard Newman.
