= Diana Wilkinson =

British swimmer (born 1944)

Personal information
- Nationality: British (English)
- Born: 17 March 1944 (age 82) Stockport, England

Sport
- Sport: Swimming
- Event: Freestyle
- Club: Stockport SC
Medal record
Swimming
Representing England
British Empire & Commonwealth Games
Gold medal – first place	1958 Cardiff	medley relay
Bronze medal – third place	1958 Cardiff	freestyle relay
Silver medal – second place	1962 Perth	medley relay
Bronze medal – third place	1962 Perth	freestyle relay
Bronze medal – third place	1966 Kingston	freestyle relay
Representing Great Britain
European Championships
Silver medal – second place	1958 Budapest	4×100m freestyle
Bronze medal – third place	1958 Budapest	4×100m medley
Silver medal – second place	1962 Leipzig	4×100m freestyle
Silver medal – second place	1962 Leipzig	100m freestyle
Bronze medal – third place	1962 Leipzig	4×100m medley

Diana Elizabeth Wilkinson married name Bishop (born 17 March 1944) is a retired British freestyle swimmer. She competed in the British Empire and Commonwealth Games from 1958 to 1966, the 1958 and 1962 European Aquatics Championships, and the 1960 and 1964 Summer Olympics.

== Biography ==
She won five medals at the 1958 and 1962 European Aquatics Championships. She also participated in the 1960 and 1964 Summer Olympics.

Wilkinson was just 16 years old when she represented Great Britain at the 1960 Summer Olympics in the 100 metre freestyle, in the event she finished in third place in her heat and didn't qualify for the next round. Four years later she competed in two events at the 1964 Summer Olympics, she entered the 100 metre freestyle again and this time she finished fifth in her heat so didn't advance to the next round, she was also a part of the 4 × 100 metre freestyle relay team which finished last in there heat and didn't advance to the final.

She competed in four Commonwealth Games winning five medals. In May 1958 she took part in the Empire Games trials in Blackpool and subsequently represented the English team at the 1958 British Empire and Commonwealth Games in Cardiff, Wales. She competed in the 110 & 440 yards freestyle events and helped England claim the gold medal in the final of the women's 4 x 110 yards medley relay, with Judy Grinham, Anita Lonsbrough and Christine Gosden and the bronze medal in the final of the women's 4 x 110 yards freestyle, with Beryl Noakes, Judy Grinham and Anne Marshall.

Four years later she won a silver medal in the medley relay and a third consecutive bronze in the freestyle relay, at the 1962 British Empire and Commonwealth Games in Perth, Western Australia. Finally during the 1966 British Empire and Commonwealth Games in Kingston, Jamaica she won her final and fourth consecutive freestyle relay medal.

She is a four times winner of the British Championship in 100 metres freestyle (1961-1964) and the 200 metres freestyle in 1962.

== Family ==
Her older brother is Christopher Wilkinson.

== See also ==
- World record progression 4 × 100 metres medley relay
