= Bernard Newman (swimmer) =

British swimmer

Personal information
- Nationality: British (Welsh)
- Born: June 1935 Cardiff, Wales
- Died: 12 October 2007 (aged 72) Cardiff, Wales

Sport
- Sport: Swimming
- Event: Freestyle
- Club: City of Cardiff SC

Bernard F. Newman (born 1935 – 12 October 2007) was a Welsh swimmer who specialised in freestyle and competed at the Commonwealth Games.

== Biography ==
Newman, born in Moorland Road, Splott, Cardiff, was a member of the City of Cardiff Swimming Club and also competed in water polo for Wales.

He won the 100 metres freestyle at the Wales versus Ireland international swimming gala in May 1958 and won the 110 yards event for the Welsh Wanderers at the recently opened Wales Empire Pool.

He represented the Welsh team at the 1958 British Empire and Commonwealth Games in Cardiff, Wales, where he competed in the 110 yds freestyle event and helped Wales secure a sixth place finish in the final of the men's 110 yards medley relay with John Brockway, John Beavan and Richard Evans.

Before National Service, Newman worked as a metropolitan police cadet at Hendon Police College before changing career and moving to the automotive industry. His career included spells at Norton's in Penarth Road, Nash's of Cardiff and Continental Cars Mercedes-Benz.

He also worked as a coach for the Welsh Institute of Sport. Newman died on October 12 at St David's Hospital, Cardiff.
