= John Beavan (swimmer) =

British swimmer

Personal information
- Nationality: British (Welsh)
- Born: 1935 (age 90–91) Newport, Wales

Sport
- Sport: Swimming
- Event: Breaststroke
- Club: Sparkhill SC; Maindee SC

John E. Beavan (born 1935) is a Welsh former swimmer who specialised in breaststroke and competed at the Commonwealth Games.

== Biography ==
Beavan born in Newport worked as a draughtsman in Birmingham and while based there swam for the Sparkhill Swimming Club.

However, his main success came as a member of the Maindee Swimming Club of Newport and in March 1958 set a new Welsh record for 220 yards breaststroke after recording a time of 2 minutes 45.2 seconds. He was selected by Great Britain for the match against Germany to celebrate the opening of the Wales Empire Pool. He won the 200 metres breaststroke and was the stand out swimmer at the Wales versus Ireland international swimming gala in May 1958.

He represented the Welsh team at the 1958 British Empire and Commonwealth Games in Cardiff, Wales, where he reached the final of the 220 yards breaststroke and helped Wales secure a sixth place finish in the final of the men's 110 yards medley relay with John Brockway, Bernard Newman and Richard Evans.

Four years later, he represented the 1962 Welsh team at the 1962 British Empire and Commonwealth Games in Perth, Australia, where he participated in the 110 and 220 yards breaststroke events.
