= Swimming at the 1956 Summer Olympics – Women's 100 metre butterfly =

Women's 100 metre butterfly at the Games of the XVI Olympiad
- Venue: Swimming and Diving Stadium
- Date: 3 December 1956 (heats); 5 December 1956 (final)
- Competitors: 12 from 18 nations
- Winning time: 1:11.0 OR

Medalists
1st place, gold medalist(s)		Shelley Mann	United States
2nd place, silver medalist(s)		Nancy Ramey	United States
3rd place, bronze medalist(s)		Mary Sears	United States

The women's 100 metre butterfly event at the 1956 Olympic Games took place on 3 and 5 December. This swimming event used the butterfly stroke. Because an Olympic-size swimming pool is 50 metres long, this race consisted of two lengths of the pool.

== Results ==
=== Heats ===
Eight fastest swimmers from the heats advanced to the finals.

Heat 1

Rank	Athlete	Country	Time	Notes
1	Shelley Mann	United States	1:11.2	Q
2	Nancy Ramey	United States	1:13.4	Q
3	Sara Barber	Canada	1:16.2	Q
4	Marta Skupilová	Czechoslovakia	1:17.7	
5	Maureen Giles	Australia	1:19.4	

Heat 2

Rank	Athlete	Country	Time	Notes
1	Beverley Bainbridge	Australia	1:14.4	Q
2	Mary Sears	United States	1:15.1	Q
3	Mária Littomeritzky	Hungary	1:15.2	Q
4	Beth Whittall	Canada	1:16.9	Q
5	Jutta Langenau	United Team of Germany	1:17.4	Q
6	Anne Morton	Great Britain	1:17.7	
7	Odette Lusien-Casteur	France	1:19.8	

=== Final ===
Rank	Athlete	Country	Time	Notes
1	Shelley Mann	United States	1:11.0	OR
2	Nancy Ramey	United States	1:11.9	
3	Mary Sears	United States	1:14.4	
4	Mária Littomeritzky	Hungary	1:14.9	
5	Beverley Bainbridge	Australia	1:15.2	
6	Jutta Langenau	United Team of Germany	1:17.4	
7	Beth Whittall	Canada	1:17.9	
8	Sara Barber	Canada	1:18.4	

Key: OR = Olympic record
