= Marrian =

Marrian is a surname. Notable people with the surname include:

- Guy Frederic Marrian (1904–1981), British biochemist
- Stephanie Marrian (born 1948), British model, pop star and actress
- Valerie Marrian (born c.1933), Scottish diver
