= Angus McKenzie =

Angus McKenzie can refer to:

- Angus McKenzie (cricketer)
- Angus McKenzie (fencer)
