= Maureen Giles =

Australian swimmer

Personal information
- Born: 27 January 1938 (age 88)

Sport
- Sport: Swimming
- Strokes: butterfly

Maureen Giles (born 27 January 1938) is an Australian former swimmer. She competed in the women's 100 metre butterfly at the 1956 Summer Olympics. She married John Monckton, an Australian swimmer who also competed at the 1956 Olympics.
