= Richard Hemingway =

British swimmer

Personal information
- Nationality: British (English)
- Born: 4 February 1938 Leeds, England
- Died: 23 July 2017 (aged 79) Clayton, California, U.S.

Sport
- Sport: Swimming
- Event: Breaststroke
- Club: Roundhay SC; Holbeck SC

Richard John Hemingway (4 February 1938 – 23 July 2017), was a male swimmer who competed for England.

== Biography ==
Hemingway first swam for the Roundhay SC, while a pupil at the Roundhay Boys School.

In May 1958 he took part in the Empire Games trials in Blackpool and subsequently represented the English team at the 1958 British Empire and Commonwealth Games in Cardiff, Wales, where he competed in the 220 yards breaststroke event.
