= Anne Marshall (swimmer) =

English swimmer (born 1941)

Personal information
- Born: 1941 (age 84–85) Surrey, England

Sport
- Sport: Swimming
- Event: Freestyle
- Club: Kingston Ladies
Medal record
Swimming
Representing England
British Empire & Commonwealth Games
Bronze medal – third place	1958 Cardiff	440y freestyle relay

Anne Marshall (born 1941) is an English former swimmer.

== Biography ==
In May 1958, Marshall took part in the Empire Games trials in Blackpool and subsequently represented the English team at the 1958 British Empire and Commonwealth Games in Cardiff, Wales. She helped England claim the bronze medal in the final of the women's 4 x 110 yards freestyle, with Beryl Noakes, Diana Wilkinson and Judy Grinham.

Marshall swam for the Kingston Ladies and Hampstead Swimming Clubs.

In 1961, Marshall married fellow international swimmer Jim Hill.
