= British swimming champions – 100 metres freestyle winners =

British swimming event

The British swimming champions over 100 metres freestyle, formerly the (Amateur Swimming Association (ASA) National Championships) are listed below.

The event was originally contested over 110 yards and then switched to the metric conversion of 100 metres in 1971. In 1963 Bob McGregor of Scotland set a world record in the heats (54.4 sec) and the final (54.1 sec). In 1975 and 1984 there was a dead-heat in the women's final.

The most successful male and female competitors in the history of the event are Bob McGregor with six titles between 1962 and 1968, and Karen Pickering with seven. Fran Halsall has won the most consecutive titles, six from 2009 to 2014. The current champions (2025) are Matt Richards (his second) and Freya Anderson (her fifth).

== 100 metres freestyle champions ==
| Year | Men's champion | Women's champion |
|---|---|---|
| | 110 yards | 110 yards |
| 1946 | Alex Jany | Nancy Riach |
| 1947 | Pat Kendall | Nancy Riach |
| 1948 | Ronald Stedman | Margaret Wellington |
| 1949 | Ronald Stedman | Betty Turner |
| 1950 | Pat Kendall | Margaret Linton |
| 1951 | Göran Larsson | Margaret Linton |
| 1952 | Jack Wardrop | Angela Barnwell |
| 1953 | Ronald Roberts | Jean Botham |
| 1954 | Geoffrey Baxter | Jean Botham |
| 1955 | Ronald Roberts | Fearne Ewart |
| 1956 | Neil McKechnie | Virginia Grant |
| 1957 | Neil McKechnie | Diana Wilkinson |
| 1958 | Ian Black | Judy Grinham |
| 1959 | Ian Black | Natalie Steward |
| 1960 | Stan Clarke | Natalie Steward |
| 1961 | John Martin-Dye | Diana Wilkinson |
| 1962 | Bob McGregor | Diana Wilkinson |
| 1963 | Bob McGregor | Diana Wilkinson |
| 1964 | Bob McGregor | Diana Wilkinson |
| 1965 | Bob Lord | Marion Lay |
| 1966 | Bob McGregor | Pauline Sillett |
| 1967 | Bob McGregor | Alexandra Jackson |
| 1968 | Bob McGregor | Alexandra Jackson |
| 1969 | Malcolm Windeatt | Alexandra Jackson |
| 1970 | Malcolm Windeatt | Alexandra Jackson |
| | 100 metres | 100 metres |
| 1971 | Malcolm Windeatt | Linda Hill |
| 1972 | Malcolm Windeatt | Lesley Allardice |
| 1973 | Colin Cunningham | Lesley Allardice |
| 1974 | Brian Brinkley | Gail Amundrud |
| 1975 | Gordon Downie | Susan Barnard & Debbie Hill |
| 1976 | Kevin Burns | Cheryl Brazendale |
| 1977 | Martin Smith | Vanessa Bullock |
| 1978 | Richard Burrell | Sharron Davies |
| 1979 | Richard Burrell | |
| 1980 | Martin Smith | June Croft |
| 1981 | Mark Taylor | June Croft |
| 1982 | David Lowe | June Croft |
| 1983 | David Lowe | June Croft |
| 1984 | David Lowe | Kate Jackson & Debra Gore |
| 1985 | Mark Reynolds | Alyson Jones |
| 1986 | Roland Lee | Annette Cowley |
| 1987 | Roland Lee | Zara Long |
| 1988 | Andy Jameson | Conny van Bentum |
| 1989 | Mike Fibbens | Karen Pickering |
| 1990 | John Steel | Karen Pickering |
| 1991 | Mike Fibbens | Karen Pickering |
| 1992 | Mike Fibbens | Karen Pickering |
| 1993 | Mike Fibbens | Karen Pickering |
| 1994 | Nicholas Shackell | Sue Rolph |
| 1995 | Simon Handley | Sue Rolph |
| 1996 | Gavin Meadows | Jessica Craig |
| 1997 | Gavin Meadows | Karen Pickering |
| 1998 | Sion Brinn | Sue Rolph |
| 1999 | Gavin Meadows | Sue Rolph |
| 2000 | Mark Stevens | Karen Pickering |
| 2001 | Paul Palmer | Rosalind Brett |
| 2002 | Matthew Kidd | Melanie Marshall |
| 2003 | Chris Cozens | Alison Sheppard |
| 2004 | Matthew Kidd | Melanie Marshall |
| 2005 | Chris Cozens | Melanie Marshall |
| 2006 | Ross Davenport | Rosalind Brett |
| 2007 | Daniel Coombs | Kate Richardson |
| 2008 | Ben Hockin | Caitlin McClatchey |
| 2009 | Adam Brown | Francesca Halsall |
| 2010 | Adam Brown | Francesca Halsall |
| 2011 | Adam Brown | Francesca Halsall |
| 2012 | Simon Burnett | Francesca Halsall |
| 2013 | Adam Brown | Francesca Halsall |
| 2014 | Adam Brown | Francesca Halsall |
| 2015 | Calum Jarvis | Siobhan-Marie O'Connor |
| 2016 | Duncan Scott | Siobhan-Marie O'Connor |
| 2017 | Duncan Scott | Freya Anderson |
| 2018 | Lewis Burras | Freya Anderson |
| 2019 | Duncan Scott | Freya Anderson |
Not held during 2020 and 2021 due to the COVID-19 pandemic
| 2022 | Lewis Burras | Anna Hopkin |
| 2023 | Lewis Burras | Freya Anderson |
| 2024 | Matt Richards | Anna Hopkin |
| 2025 | Matt Richards | Freya Anderson |
| 2026 | Matt Richards | Eva Okaro |

== See also ==
- Aquatics GB
- List of British Swimming champions
