= Bill Law (diver) =

Scottish diver

Personal information
- Nationality: British (Scottish)
- Born: 3 June 1934 Tollcross, Edinburgh, Scotland
- Died: 19 December, 2009 (aged 75) Edinburgh, Scotland

Sport
- Sport: Diving
- Event(s): Springboard, platform
- Club: Warrender ASC, Edinburgh

William "Bill" Law (3 June 1934 – 19 December 2009) was a diver from Scotland, who represented Scotland at the British Empire and Commonwealth Games (now Commonwealth Games).

== Biography ==
Law was born in Tollcross, Edinburgh, Scotland and attended Daroch School. He spent ten years as a glazier, with Cunningham Dickson and Walker before joining the Scottish Insurance Corporation.

He was a member of the Warrender Amateur Swimming Club in Edinburgh and was the 1957 Scottish sprinbgoard champion. He was in the Scottish team that competed against the Russian team in May 1958.

Law represented the Scottish Empire and Commonwealth Games team at the 1958 British Empire Games in Cardiff, Wales, participating in the springboard and platform diving events.
