= British swimming champions – 100 metres backstroke winners =

British swimming event

The British swimming champions over 100 metres backstroke, formerly the (Amateur Swimming Association (ASA) National Championships) are listed below. The event was originally contested over 110 yards and then switched to the metric conversion of 100 metres in 1971.

In 1960 Natalie Steward set a world record of in the final. In 1962 final Linda Ludgrove also set a new world record of 1.10.9 sec. In 1996 there was dead-heat in the women's final.

Kathy Read (married name Osher) has won a record number of senior National titles (29), which includes a record ten 100 metres backstroke titles. The men's record is seven for John Brockway. The current (2025) champions are Oliver Morgan and Katie Shanahan.

== 100 metres backstroke champions ==
Year	Men's champion	Women's champion
	150 yards	150 yards
1946	Georges Vallery	Monique Berlioux
	110 yards	110 yards
1947	Bert Kinnear	Catherine Gibson
1948	John Brockway	Ngaire Lane
1949	John Brockway	Helen Yate
1950	John Brockway	Margaret McDowall
1951	John Brockway	Margaret McDowall
1952	Robert Wardrop	Margaret McDowall
1953	John Brockway	Margaret McDowall
1954	John Brockway	Pat Symons
1955	John Brockway	Judy Grinham
1956	Graham Sykes	Judy Grinham
1957	Graham Sykes	Julie Hoyle
1958	Graham Sykes	Judy Grinham
1959	Graham Sykes	Margaret Edwards
1960	Graham Sykes	Natalie Steward
1961	not contested	Margaret Edwards
1962	not contested	Linda Ludgrove
1963	not contested	Linda Ludgrove
1964	Brian Stewart	Linda Ludgrove
1965	Brian Stewart	Ann Fairlie
1966	Roddy Jones	Linda Ludgrove
1967	Roddy Jones	Linda Ludgrove
1968	Roddy Jones	Wendy Burrell
1969	Clive Rushton	Donna Gurr
1970	Mike Richards	Glenda Sirling
	100 metres	100 metres
1971	Mike Richards	Diana Ashton
1972	Colin Cunningham	Jackie Brown
1973	Colin Cunningham	Margaret Kelly
1974	Steve Pickell	Wendy Cook
1975	Gary Abraham	Michelle Crook
1976	Gary Abraham	Amanda James
1977	Gary Abraham	Joy Beasley
1978	Gary Abraham	Amanda James
1979	Gary Abraham	
1980	Douglas Campbell	Helen Jameson
1981	Gary Abraham	Helen Jameson
1982	Stephen Harrison	Cathy White
1983	Jon Randall	Cathy White
1984	John Davey	Kathy Read
1985	Mark Matthews	Kathy Read
1986	Neil Harper	Kathy Read
1987	Gary Binfield	Kathy Read
1988	Neil Cochran	Kathy Read
1989	Gary Binfield	Kathy Read
1990	Martin Harris	Sharon Page
1991	Martin Harris	Kathy Read
1992	Martin Harris	Kathy Read
1993	Martin Harris	Kathy Read-Osher
1994	Martin Harris	Emma Tattam
1995	Neil Willey	Zoe Cray
1996	Eran Groumi	Sarah Price & Kathy Read-Osher
1997	Neil Willey	Sarah Price
1998	Adam Ruckwood	Sarah Price
1999	Martin Harris	Katy Sexton
2000	Adam Ruckwood	Katy Sexton
2001	Adam Ruckwood	Sarah Price
2002	Gregor Tait	Sarah Price
2003	Gregor Tait	Katy Sexton
2004	Gregor Tait	Katy Sexton
2005	James Goddard	Gemma Spofforth
2006	Matthew Clay	Katy Sexton
2007	Marco Loughran	Katy Sexton
2008	Gregor Tait	Gemma Spofforth
2009	Liam Tancock	Elizabeth Simmonds
2010	Liam Tancock	Elizabeth Simmonds
2011	Liam Tancock	Gemma Spofforth
2012	Liam Tancock	Gemma Spofforth
2013	Chris Walker-Hebborn	Lauren Quigley
2014	Chris Walker-Hebborn	Georgia Davies
2015	Chris Walker-Hebborn	Lizzie Simmonds
2016	Chris Walker-Hebborn	Georgia Davies
2017	Chris Walker-Hebborn	Georgia Davies
2018	Jan-Philip Glania	Lizzie Simmonds
2019	Luke Greenbank	Georgia Davies
Not held during 2020 and 2021 due to the COVID-19 pandemic
2022	Luke Greenbank	Medi Harris
2023	Oliver Morgan	Medi Harris
2024	Oliver Morgan	Kathleen Dawson
2025	Oliver Morgan	Katie Shanahan
2026	Oliver Morgan	Lauren Cox

== See also ==
- Aquatics GB
- List of British Swimming champions
