= James Leiper =

Scottish swimmer

Personal information
- Nationality: British (Scottish)
- Born: 1937 Scotland

Sport
- Sport: Swimming
- Event(s): Freestyle, backstroke
- Club: Stonehaven ASC; Stoke Newington
Medal record
Representing (Scotland)
Commonwealth Games
Silver medal – second place	1958 Cardiff	4×220y relay

James G. Leiper (born 1937) is a Scottish former swimmer who won a silver medal at the Commonwealth Games.

== Biography ==
In 1957 Leiper lived at 55 Fetteresso Terrace in Stonehaven and he was a member of the Stonehaven Amateur Swimming Club. He was the first member of the club to win a Northern District Championship.

He studied at the University of Aberdeen and after the Games worked as an engineering consultant in London.

He was selected for the 1958 Scottish team for the 1958 British Empire and Commonwealth Games in Cardiff, Wales, where he competed in the 110y freestyle and 4×220y freestyle relay and won a silver medal.

In 1960 he was swimming for Stoke Newington.
