= William Slater (swimmer) =

Canadian swimmer (1940–2019)

- Slater, U. Penn Sr. Photo, 1962

Personal information
- Full name: William George McKenzie Slater
- Nickname: Bill
- Nationality: Canadian
- Born: 18 April 1940 Vancouver, British Columbia, Canada
- Died: 2 February 2019 (aged 78) Vancouver, British Columbia
- Occupation: Investment Manager
- Spouse: Carol

Sport
- Sport: Swimming
- Strokes: freestyle
- Club: Canadian Dolphins; Vancouver, B.C.
- College team: University of Pennsylvania
- Coach: Howard Firby (Dolphins); William Campbell (U. Penn)
Medal record
Representing Canada
British Empire and Commonwealth Games
Bronze medal – third place	1958 Cardiff	4×220yd freestyle relay

William George McKenzie Slater (18 April 1940 – 2 February 2019) was a Canadian swimmer who competed in his youth for Vancouver's Canadian Dolphins and represented Canada in two freestyle events at the 1956 Melbourne Olympics. During his noteworthy swimming career, he established just under 20 Canadian records spanning various distances. After graduating the Wharton School of Business at the University of Pennsylvania with a degree in Economics in 1962, he worked as an Investment Manager.

== Early life ==
Born April 18, 1940, in Vancouver, British Columbia. Beginning to swim at 13, Slater was coached in his youth by Hall of Fame Coach Howard Firby after 1956 with the Vancouver Dolphins and earlier with Firby's Vancouver Amateur Swim Club. Firby started the Dolphins in 1955 with William Stewart, the father of Canadian Olympian Mary Stewart, who was one of the original members. Future Canadian Olympians Mary Stewart and her sister Helen trained with Slater during practices of the Dolphin Club. In its early years, the team met at Vancouver's Crystal Pool at Sunset Beach, but moved to the Vancouver Aquatic Center in 1974. The Dolphins won six national team championships between 1961–1967, with the exception of the year 1965. A strong program, their swimmers set 11 world records and over 300 Canadian National records.

== 1956 Melbourne Olympics ==
Slater competed in two events at the 1956 Summer Olympics. He finished 12th overall in the 400-meter freestyle, placing third in the 4th preliminary heat with a time of 4:40.4. He placed 5th in the finals of the 1500 meter freestyle with a time of 18:38.1, around 30 second out of medal contention in the long event. Murray Rose of Australia placed first with a time of 17:58.9, with Japan and the U.S. respectively taking the silver and bronze medals.

In international competition at the 1958 British Empire and Commonwealth Games in 1958, he captured a bronze medal in the 4×220 yard relay event, with Canadian team members Kenneth Williams, Cam Grout, and the non-Olympic swimmer Peter Bell. At the 1958 Games, he also secured a fourth place in the 1650 yard freestyle. With less success, he was eliminated in the heats of the 440 yards competition at the Games and did not make the finals.

=== University of Pennsylvania ===
Slater enrolled in the Fall of 1958 at the Wharton School of Business at the University of Pennsylvania and graduated with a B.S. in Economics in 1962. He competed for the school’s collegiate swimming team serving as a Captain under the guidance of Penn head coach William Campbell. After college graduation, he swam professionally for a brief interlude after 1962. He was considered by several opposing coaches, including LeHigh's Coach Bill Christian as one of Pennsylvania's top swimmers, and Christian noted that Slater was versatile in the events in which he participated, and could compete in as many as three in any given meet.

He married his wife Carol around 1969, and the couple had four children.

Slater worked in the business field as an investment counselor and served for a period with Vancouver's Phillips, Hager and North Investment Services.

Slater died February 2, 2019, at Vancouver's North Shore Hospice.

=== Honors ===
After receiving the bronze medal in the 1958 British Empire and Commonwealth Games, he was the recipient of the Sir Edward Beatty Trophy by the Canadian Amateur Swimming Association as the top Canadian male swimmer.
