= Judy Samuel =

British swimmer

Personal information
- Full name: Judith Veronica Samuel
- Nationality: British (English)
- Born: 2 August 1943 (age 82) Puttalam, British Ceylon
- Height: 171 cm (5 ft 7 in)
- Weight: 63 kg (139 lb)

Sport
- Sport: Swimming
- Strokes: Freestyle
- Club: Surrey Ladies
Medal record
Representing Great Britain
European Championships
Silver medal – second place	1958 Budapest	4×100m freestyle

Judith Veronica Samuel (born 2 August 1943) is a retired British freestyle swimmer who competed at the 1960 Summer Olympics.

== Biography ==
She won a silver medal in the 4 × 100 m relay at the 1958 European Aquatics Championships.

Samuel represented the English team at the 1958 British Empire and Commonwealth Games in Cardiff, Wales, where she competed in the 440 yards freestyle event.

At the 1960 Olympics Games in Rome, she was part of the British team that was fifth in the 4 × 100 m relay.
