= Christine Gosden =

British swimmer (born 1939)

Personal information
- Nationality: British (English)
- Born: 17 November 1939 (age 86) York, England
- Height: 1.79 m (5 ft 10 in)
- Weight: 71 kg (157 lb; 11.2 st)

Sport
- Sport: Swimming
- Strokes: Breaststroke, Butterfly
- Club: Croydon SC
Medal record
Women's swimming
Representing England
British Empire & Commonwealth Games
Gold medal – first place	1958 Cardiff	440y medley relay
Bronze medal – third place	1958 Cardiff	220y breastroke
Representing Great Britain
European Championships
Bronze medal – third place	1958 Budapest	4×100 m medley
Universiade
Gold medal – first place	1959 Turin	200 m breaststroke
Silver medal – second place	1959 Turin	400 m freestyle
Silver medal – second place	1959 Turin	100 m butterfly
Silver medal – second place	1961 Sofia	200 m breaststroke

Christine Lorraine Gosden (born 17 November 1939), also known by her married name Christine Parfect, is a female retired British swimmer who competed in the 200-metre breaststroke event at the 1956 and 1960 Summer Olympics and finished eighth in 1956.

== Biography ==
In May 1958 she took part in the Empire Games trials in Blackpool and subsequently represented the English team at the 1958 British Empire and Commonwealth Games in Cardiff, Wales. She competed in the 220 yards breaststroke event winning a bronze medal and helped England claim the gold medal in the final of the women's 4 x 110 yards medley relay, with Judy Grinham, Anita Lonsbrough and Diana Wilkinson.

She also won a bronze medal in the 4×100-metre medley relay at the 1958 European Aquatics Championships At the ASA National British Championships she won the 220 yards breaststroke title and the 110 yards butterfly title in 1957.
