= British swimming champions – 200 metres freestyle winners =

British swimming event

The British swimming champions over 200 metres freestyle, formerly the (Amateur Swimming Association (ASA) National Championships) are listed below.

The event was originally contested over 220 yards and then switched to the metric conversion of 200 metres in 1971.

In 1981 there was a dead-heat in the men's final.

The most successful male and female competitors in the history of the event are Paul Palmer with six titles, and Karen Pickering with nine. Brian Brinkley has won the most consecutive championships, five, between 1971 and 1975. The current champions (2025) are James Guy (fifth) and Duncan Scott (third) following an unprecedented dead heat result and Freya Colbert (her second).

== 200 metres freestyle champions ==
Year	Men's champion	Women's champion
	220 yards	220 yards
1946	Alex Jany	Nancy Riach
1947	Jack Hale	Catherine Gibson
1948	Jack Hale	Catherine Gibson
1949	Per-Olof Östrand	Margaret Wellington
1950	Jack Wardrop	Margaret Linton
1951	Göran Larsson	Daphne Wilkinson
1952	Jack Wardrop	Lillian Preece
1953	Ronald Roberts	
1954	Jack Wardrop	Jean Botham
1955	Neil McKechnie	Virginia Grant
1956	Neil McKechnie	Virginia Grant
1957	Neil McKechnie	Judy Grinham
1958	Ian Black	Elspeth Ferguson
1959	Ian Black	Natalie Steward
1960	Stan Clarke	Natalie Steward
1961	John Martin-Dye	Nan Rae
1962	Murray Lang McLachlan	Diana Wilkinson
1963	Bob McGregor	Anita Lonsbrough
1964	Geoff Grylls	Liz Long
1965	Geoff Grylls	Liz Long
1966	Bob McGregor	Jeanette Cave
1967	Tony Jarvis	Susan Williams
1968	Tony Jarvis	Alexandra Jackson
1969	Martyn Woodroffe	Shelagh Ratcliffe
1970	Mike Borrie	Alexandra Jackson
	200 metres	200 metres
1971	Brian Brinkley	Lesley Allardice
1972	Brian Brinkley	Lesley Allardice
1973	Brian Brinkley	Lesley Allardice
1974	Brian Brinkley	Gail Amundrud
1975	Brian Brinkley	Susan Barnard
1976	Alan McClatchey	Moira Houston
1977	Gordon Downie	Sharron Davies
1978	David Dunne	Sharron Davies
1979	Gordon Downie	
1980	Philip Hubble	Jackie Willmott
1981	Andrew Astbury & Mark Taylor	Conny van Bentum
1982	John Davey	June Croft
1983	Philip Hubble	June Croft
1984	John Davey	Kate Jackson
1985	Mark Reynolds	Karen Mellor
1986		Annette Cowley
1987	Jonathan Broughton	Ruth Gilfillan
1988	Roland Lee	Conny van Bentum
1989	Jonathan Broughton	Joanna Coull
1990	Paul Howe	Karen Pickering
1991	Paul Howe	Ruth Gilfillan
1992	Paul Howe	Karen Pickering
1993	Paul Palmer	Karen Pickering
1994	James Salter	Karen Pickering
1995	Paul Palmer	Karen Pickering
1996	Gavin Meadows	Sarah Collings
1997	James Salter	Karen Pickering
1998	Paul Palmer	Claire Huddart
1999	Paul Palmer	Karen Pickering
2000	Paul Palmer	Karen Legg
2001	Paul Palmer	Karen Legg
2002	James Salter	Karen Pickering
2003	James Salter	Karen Pickering
2004	Simon Burnett	Melanie Marshall
2005	David Carry	Melanie Marshall
2006	David Carry	Joanne Jackson
2007	Daniel Coombs	Kate Richardson
2008	Ross Davenport	Rebecca Adlington
2009	Ross Davenport	Joanne Jackson
2010	Robert Bale	Rebecca Adlington
2011	Ross Davenport	Rebecca Adlington
2012	Robert Renwick	Rebecca Turner
2013	Robert Renwick	Eleanor Faulkner
2014	James Guy	Siobhan-Marie O'Connor
2015	James Guy	Jazmin Carlin
2016	James Guy	Jazmin Carlin
2017	James Guy	Eleanor Faulkner
2018	Stephen Milne	Kathryn Greenslade
2019	Duncan Scott	Freya Anderson
Not held during 2020 and 2021 due to the COVID-19 pandemic
2022	Duncan Scott	Abbie Wood
2023	Matt Richards	Freya Anderson
Aquatics GB Swimming Championships
2024	Matt Richards	Freya Colbert
2025	Duncan Scott & James Guy	Freya Colbert
2026	-	Freya Colbert

== See also ==
- Aquatics GB
- List of British Swimming champions
