= Elspeth Ferguson =

English competitive swimmer

Personal information
- Nationality: British (English)
- Born: First quarter 1940 York, England

Sport
- Sport: Swimming
- Event: Freestyle
- Club: York City

Elspeth C Ferguson (born 1940) is a female former swimmer who competed for England.

== Biography ==
Ferguson attended Mill Mount Grammar School in York and represented the English team at the 1958 British Empire and Commonwealth Games in Cardiff, Wales, where she competed in the 440 yards freestyle event.

After switching to contact lenses in 1956 her swimming career took off and swimming for the York Club she won the 1958 ASA National Championship 220 yards freestyle title and the 1957 and 1958 ASA National Championship 440 yards freestyle titles.

She married Robert Hunter in York during 1974.
