= Molly Wieland =

English diver

Personal information
- Nationality: British (English)
- Born: Fourth quarter 1934 Romford, England

Sport
- Sport: Diving
- Club: Isander; Mermaid
Medal record
Diving
Representing England
British Empire & Commonwealth Games
Bronze medal – third place	1958 Cardiff	10m Platform

Molly E.E. Wieland (born 1934), married name Molly Zimmermann is a female former diver who competed for England.

== Biography ==
Wieland represented the England team and won a bronze medal in the 10 metres platform event at the 1958 British Empire and Commonwealth Games in Cardiff, Wales.

In 1963, she became engaged to Brian Zimmermann (a water polo player) and the couple emigrated to Canada and as of 2024 was living in Westlake Village.
