= Beryl Noakes =

British swimmer

Personal information
- Nationality: British (English)
- Born: 29 July 1942 (age 83) London, England

Sport
- Sport: Swimming
- Strokes: Freestyle
- Club: Woolwich
Medal record
Swimming
Representing England
British Empire & Commonwealth Games
Bronze medal – third place	1958 Cardiff	freestyle relay

Beryl O. Noakes (born 29 July 1942) is a British former swimmer who competed at the 1960 Summer Olympics.

== Biography ==
In May 1958 she took part in the Empire Games trials in Blackpool and subsequently represented the English team at the 1958 British Empire and Commonwealth Games in Cardiff, Wales. She helped England claim the bronze medal in the final of the women's 4 x 110 yards freestyle, with Diana Wilkinson, Judy Grinham and Anne Marshall.

At the 1960 Olympic Games in Rome, she competed in the women's 4 × 100 metre freestyle relay.
