= Nan Rae =

Scottish swimmer

Personal information
- Full name: Agnes W. Nancy Rae
- Nationality: British (Scottish)
- Born: 14 January 1944 (age 82) Motherwell, Scotland
- Height: 1.56 m (5 ft 1 in)
- Weight: 53 kg (117 lb)

Sport
- Sport: Swimming
- Event: Freestyle
- Club: Motherwell AS & WP Club
Medal record
Representing Great Britain
European Championships
Bronze medal – third place	1958 Budapest	400 m freestyle

Agnes W. Nancy Rae (born 13 January 1944) is a Scottish former competitive swimmer who competed at the 1960 Summer Olympics.

== Biography ==
Rae won a bronze medal in the women's 400-metre freestyle at the 1958 European Aquatics Championships.

She was selected for the 1958 Scottish team for the 1958 British Empire and Commonwealth Games in Cardiff, Wales, where she competed in the 440 yards freestyle.

At the 1960 Olympic Games in Rome, she finished sixth in the 400 metres freestyle.

She won the 1961 ASA National Championship 220 yards freestyle title and the 440 yards freestyle.
