= Julie Hoyle =

British swimmer

Personal information
- Born: 27 March 1939 (age 87) Watford

Sport
- Sport: Swimming
- Club: Watford Swimming Club

Julie Hoyle (born 27 March 1939) is a British former swimmer. Hoyle competed in the women's 100 metre backstroke at the 1956 Summer Olympics. At the ASA National British Championships she won the 110 yards backstroke title in 1957.
