= Keith Collin =

British diver (1937–1991)

Personal information
- Full name: Keith Roper Collin
- Born: 18 January 1937 London, England
- Died: 6 March 1991 (aged 54) Hounslow, England
- Height: 168 cm (5 ft 6 in)
- Weight: 63 kg (139 lb)

Sport
- Sport: Diving
- Event: 3 metres (9.8 ft) springboard diving
- Club: Isleworth Penguins SC

Achievements and titles
- Olympic finals: 1960 Summer Olympics - 26th
Medal record
British Empire and Commonwealth Games
Gold medal – first place	1958 Wales	3m springboard

Keith Roper Collin (18 January 1937 – 6 March 1991) was a British diver who won the gold medal in the Men's 3 metres (9.8 ft) springboard diving at the 1958 British Empire and Commonwealth Games and competed at the 1960 Summer Olympics.

== Biography ==
At the age of 21 Collin completed for the England team at the 1958 British Empire and Commonwealth Games, which was hosted in Wales. He competed in the men's 3 metres (9.8 ft) springboard diving, and edged out Bill Patrick from Canada to win the gold medal by 126.78 points to 124.62.

At the 1960 Summer Olympics, Collin placed in 26th place in the Men's 3 metres (9.8 ft) springboard, scoring 46.10 points but failing to qualify for the final. He was the only competitor entered from the British team.

In 1962, he represented England in the 3 metres springboard at the 1962 British Empire and Commonwealth Games in Perth, Australia.
