= Roy Walsh (diver) =

British diver (1936–2019)

Personal information
- Nationality: British
- Born: 6 September 1936 Blackpool, Great Britain
- Died: 4 January 2019 (aged 82) Lancaster, Great Britain

Sport
- Sport: Diving

Roy Walsh (6 September 1936 – 4 January 2019) was a British diver. He competed in two events at the 1956 Summer Olympics.
