= Sheila Watt =

British swimmer (1941–2023)

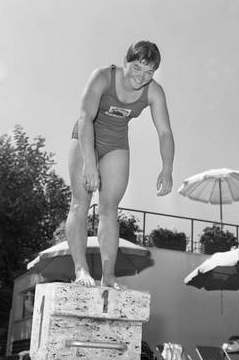
- Watt in 1960

Personal information
- Nationality: British (Scottish)
- Born: 27 January 1941 Pitapuram, Madras Presidency, British India
- Died: 10 March 2023 (aged 82) Aberdeen, Scotland
- Height: 164 cm (5 ft 5 in)
- Weight: 64 kg (141 lb)

Sport
- Sport: Swimming
- Strokes: Butterfly
- Club: Aberdeen Thistle SC

Sheila Watt (later Duthie; 27 January 1941 – 10 March 2023) was a British butterfly swimmer who competed at the 1960 Summer Olympics.

== Swimming career ==
Watt was selected for the 1958 Scottish team for the 1958 British Empire and Commonwealth Games in Cardiff, Wales, where she competed in the 110 yards butterfly.

Watt competed at the 1960 Summer Olympics in the individual 100 m butterfly and 4 × 100 m medley relay and finished in fourth and fifth place, respectively.

Swimming for the Aberdeen Thistle Swimming Club, she won the ASA National British Championships in 1958, 1959 and 1960, competing in the 100 metres butterfly competition.

She also competed for Scotland at the 1962 British Empire and Commonwealth Games.

Sheila Watt died in Aberdeen on 10 March 2023, at the age of 82.
