= Natalie Steward =

British swimmer (born 1943)

Personal information
- Full name: Natalie Alwyne Steward
- Nationality: British
- Born: 30 April 1943 (age 83) Pretoria, Gauteng, South Africa

Sport
- Sport: Swimming
- Strokes: Freestyle, Backstroke
Medal record
Women's swimming
Representing Great Britain
Olympic Games
Silver medal – second place	1960 Rome	100 m backstroke
Bronze medal – third place	1960 Rome	100 m freestyle

Natalie Alwyne Steward (born 30 April 1943) is a former British Olympic swimmer.

== Swimming career ==
Although Steward was born in Pretoria, South Africa, her family would later move to Bulawayo, Southern Rhodesia, for whom she would compete for at the 1958 British Empire and Commonwealth Games.

Steward was just 13 years old when she competed in her first Rhodesian Championships in 1956, where she won three events, he international debut happened later that year in the Durban Currie Cup, the following year she would break 23 Rhodesian senior and junior records, after the 1958 British Empire and Commonwealth Games, her family moved to Hornchurch, Essex, which allowed to compete for the Great Britain Team.

Steward represented Great Britain at the 1960 Olympic Games in Rome, Italy in four events: she won the bronze medal in the 100 m freestyle in a time of 1:03.1, and the silver medal in the 100 m backstroke in 1:10.8. She was also a member of both the 4×100 m freestyle and 4×100 m medley relay teams, finishing fifth in both events.

Following the 1960 Summer Olympics, in September while competing at the British Swimming Championships, she broke the World Record for the women's 110 yards backstroke swimming it in 71 seconds.

She was the ASA National British champion over 110 yards freestyle, 220 yards freestyle and 440 yards freestyle in 1959 and 1960 British Champion over 110 yards freestyle, 220 yards freestyle and the 110 yards backstroke.

In 1962 Steward aged just 18 years old retired and returned to Rhodesia to become a professional swimming coach.

== See also ==
- List of Olympic medalists in swimming (women)
