= Fred Cooper (sport shooter) =

British sports shooter

Personal information
- Born: 31 May 1910
- Died: 1992 (aged 81–82)

Sport
- Sport: Sports shooting

Fred Cooper (31 May 1910 – 1992) was a British sports shooter. He competed in the 25 metre pistol and the 50 metre pistol events at the 1956 Summer Olympics.
