= Ray Cann =

British diver

Personal information
- Nationality: British (English)
- Born: 13 December 1937 (age 88) Skipton-on-Swale, North Yorkshire, England

Sport
- Sport: Diving
- Club: Highgate
Medal record
Men's diving
Representing England
British Empire & Commonwealth Games
Bronze medal – third place	1958 Cardiff	10m Platform

Raymond Eric Cann (born 13 December 1937) is a male former diver who competed for England.

== Biography ==
Cann represented Great Britain in the Diving at the 1956 Summer Olympics.

He represented the England team and won a bronze medal in the 10 metres platform event at the 1958 British Empire and Commonwealth Games in Cardiff, Wales.
