= Barbara Sargeant =

Australian swimmer (1940–2021)

Personal information
- Nationality: Australian
- Born: Barbara Elizabeth Evans; 28 January 1940
- Died: 23 June 2021 (aged 81)

Sport
- Sport: Swimming
- Strokes: Breaststroke
- Club: Drummoyne Swimming Club
Medal record
Representing Australia
British Empire and Commonwealth Games
Silver medal – second place	1958 Cardiff	4×110 yd medley

Barbara Elizabeth Sargeant (née Evans; 28 January 1940 – 23 June 2021) was an Australian swimmer. She competed in the women's 200 metre breaststroke at the 1956 Summer Olympics.

Two years after 1956 Olympic Games, she won the silver medal in the 4 × 100 m medley relay and finished fifth in the 200m breaststroke final at the 1958 British Empire and Commonwealth Games in Cardiff, Wales.

She married Graham Sargeant, who also had a swimming background and won an Australian junior surf belt championship. She had two children - former Hockeyroo Megan Oman (née Sargeant) and son Andrew.
