= Jean Oldroyd =

British swimmer

Personal information
- Nationality: British (English)
- Born: 15 December 1942 (age 83) Dewsbury, England
- Height: 165 cm (5 ft 5 in)
- Weight: 64 kg (141 lb)

Sport
- Sport: Swimming
- Strokes: Butterfly
- Club: Dewsbury SC

Jean Oldroyd (born 15 December 1942) is a British former swimmer who competed at the 1960 Summer Olympics.

== Biography ==
In May 1958 she took part in the Empire Games trials in Blackpool and subsequently represented the English team at the 1958 British Empire and Commonwealth Games in Cardiff, Wales, where she competed in the 110 yards butterfly event.

At the 1960 Olympic Games in Rome she competed in two events.
