= Gergaynia Beckett =

Australian swimmer

Personal information
- Nationality: Australian
- Born: Gergaynia Amber Beckett; 25 November 1940 (age 85) Sydney, Australia

Sport
- Sport: Swimming
- Strokes: Backstroke
Medal record
Representing Australia
Olympic Games
British Empire and Commonwealth Games
Silver medal – second place	1958 Cardiff	4×110 yd medley

Gergaynia Amber Beckett born 25 November 1940) is a former Australian swimmer. She competed at the 1956 Summer Olympics and the 1960 Summer Olympics.

As a 15 year old, Beckett represented Australia at the 1956 Summer Olympics in the Women's 100 meters backstroke where she was placed second in the second heat clocking at time of 1:14.8. She was placed eighth in the finals clocking a time of 1:14.7. Beckett also participated in the 1960 Summer Olympics at Rome in the Women's 100 meters backstroke and Women's 4×100 meters medley relay. The Australian relay team came second in the race.
