= Aubrey Bürer =

South African swimmer

Personal information
- Born: 13 March 1939 (age 87) Johannesburg, South Africa

Sport
- Sport: Swimming

Aubrey Bürer (born 13 March 1939) is a South African former swimmer. He competed in three events at the 1960 Summer Olympics.
