= Henry Steele (sport shooter) =

British sports shooter (1911–1983)

Personal information
- Born: Henry Albert Steele; 10 September 1911 Medway, England
- Died: 18 April 1983 (aged 71) Stourbridge, England

Sport
- Sport: Sports shooting

Henry Albert Steele (10 September 1911 – 18 April 1983) was a British sports shooter. He competed at the 1948 Summer Olympics, 1952 Summer Olympics and 1956 Summer Olympics. Steele died on 18 April 1983, at the age of 71.
