= Jim Hinds =

British cyclist

Personal information
- Born: 6 June 1937 Streatham Hill, London, England
- Died: 10 April 2010 (aged 72)

Cycling career
- Sport: Cycling

Jim Hinds (6 June 1937 – 10 April 2010) was a British cyclist. He competed in the individual road race and team time trial events at the 1960 Summer Olympics.
