= Valerie Marrian =

Scottish diver

Personal information
- Nationality: British (Scottish)
- Born: c.1933

Sport
- Sport: Diving
- Event: Springboard
- Club: Edinburgh University SC; Warrender ASC, Edinburgh

Valerie J. Marrian (born c.1933) is a former diver from Scotland, who represented Scotland at the British Empire and Commonwealth Games (now Commonwealth Games).

== Biography ==
Marian studied medicine at the University of Edinburgh and represented their swimming club. She won three swimming titles at the 1954 Inter-Varsities Championships, after successes in the 100 yards backstroke, the springboard and the platform diving. Marrian also competed for her Warrender Amateur Swimming Club in Edinburgh.

She represented the Scottish Empire and Commonwealth Games team at the 1958 British Empire Games in Cardiff, Wales, participating in the springboard diving event.

Marrian qualified as a doctor and was a consultant paediatrician and was involved in a high profile blood tranfusion case in 1973.
