= Frederick Hopkinson =

British sports shooter

Personal information
- Born: 1 March 1922 Newark, Nottinghamshire, England
- Died: 24 June 1987 (aged 65) Newark, Nottinghamshire, England

Sport
- Sport: Sports shooting

Frederick Hopkinson (1 March 1922 – 24 June 1987) was a British sports shooter. He competed in the 50 metre rifle, three positions and the 50 metre rifle, prone events at the 1956 Summer Olympics.
