= Beverley Bainbridge =

Australian swimmer

Personal information
- Born: Beverley Ann Spargo; 28 January 1940
- Died: 9 May 2016 (aged 76)

Sport
- Sport: Swimming
Medal record
Representing Australia
British Empire and Commonwealth Games
Gold medal – first place	1958 Cardiff	110 yd butterfly
Silver medal – second place	1958 Cardiff	4×110 yd medley

Beverley Ann Bainbridge (née Spargo; 28 January 1940 – 9 May 2016) was an Australian swimmer. She competed in the women's 100 metre butterfly at the 1956 Summer Olympics.

Bainbridge died on 9 May 2016, aged 76.
