= Brian Davidson (diver) =

Scottish diver

Personal information
- Nationality: British (Scotland)
- Born: c.1943

Sport
- Sport: Diving
- Event(s): Platform, Springboard
- Club: Inverness L.M.S. SC

Alexander Brian Davidson (born c.1943) is a former diver from Scotland, who represented Scotland at the British Empire and Commonwealth Games (now Commonwealth Games).

== Biography ==
Brian Davidson, born in 1942, was initially a post office engineer by profession. He was a member of the Inverness L.M.S. Swimming Club. and was a champion of Scotland.

He represented the 1962 Scottish Team at the 1962 British Empire and Commonwealth Games in Perth, Australia, participating in the 10 metre platform event, where he reached the final.

In 1963 he retained his Scottish 3 metre springboard title and won both the 1 and 10 metres titles and by November 1963 Davidson was a post office engineer in Glasgow, after leaving Inverness.

He was also chosen by Scotland for the 1966 British Empire and Commonwealth Games in Jamaica.

His brother Alan Davidson was also a significant diver.
