= Christopher Walkden =

British swimmer

Personal information
- Nationality: British
- Born: 18 April 1938 Edinburgh, Scotland
- Died: 28 July 2011 (aged 73)

Sport
- Sport: Swimming
- Strokes: Breaststroke
- Club: Beckenham SC
Medal record
Swimming
Representing England
British Empire & Commonwealth Games
Bronze medal – third place	1958 Cardiff	220y breaststroke
Bronze medal – third place	1958 Cardiff	medley relay

Christopher Charles Walkden (18 April 1938 – 28 July 2011) was a British swimmer. He competed at the 1956 Summer Olympics and the 1960 Summer Olympics.

== Biography ==
At the 1956 Olympic Games in Melbourne, Walken participated in the 200 metres breaststroke event.

In May 1958 he took part in the Empire Games trials in Blackpool and subsequently represented the English team at the 1958 British Empire and Commonwealth Games in Cardiff, Wales. He competed in the 220 yards breaststroke event and helped England claim the bronze medal in the final of the men's 4 x 110 yards medley relay, with Graham Symonds, Neil McKechnie and Graham Sykes.

At the ASA National British Championships he won the 220 yards breaststroke title in 1955, 1956 and 1958.

Christopher died from cancer on July 28 at the age of 73.
