= Angus McKenzie (fencer) =

British fencer (1936–2022)

Personal information
- Born: 13 March 1936 Richmond, London, England
- Died: 25 September 2022 (aged 86)

Sport
- Sport: Fencing

Robert Angus McKenzie (13 March 1936 – 25 September 2022) was a British fencer. He competed in the team foil event at the 1960 Summer Olympics.

McKenzie died on 25 September 2022, at the age of 86.
