= Bob Sreenan =

Scottish swimmer

Personal information
- Nationality: British (Scottish)
- Born: 7 May 1934 (age 92) Manchester, England

Sport
- Sport: Swimming
- Event: Freestyle
- Club: Dundee Whitehall
Medal record
Representing (Scotland)
Commonwealth Games
Silver medal – second place	1958 Cardiff	4×220y relay

Robert Christie Sreenan (born 7 May 1934) is a British former swimmer. Sreenan competed at the 1952 Summer Olympics and the 1960 Summer Olympics.

== Biography ==
Sreenan was a member of the Dundee Whitehall Swimming Club and won the 1957 ASA National Championship 440 yards freestyle title.

He was selected for the 1958 Scottish team for the 1958 British Empire and Commonwealth Games in Cardiff, Wales, where he competed in the 440y freestyle, 1650y freestyle and 4×220y freestyle relay and won a silver medal.

In October 1958 he won the 400 yards Bologna Trophy but was disqualified for touching the end rail which the organisers had forgotten to remove.
