= Peter Tarsey =

British diver (1937–2015)

Personal information
- Nationality: British (English)
- Born: 5 August 1937 Brentford, England
- Died: 29 March 2015 (aged 77) Xalo, Spain

Sport
- Sport: Diving
- Event: Platform
- Club: Ealing
Medal record
Diving
Representing England
British Empire & Commonwealth Games
Bronze medal – third place	1958 Cardiff	3m Springboard

Peter David Tarsey (5 August 1937 – 29 March 2015) was a British diver who competed for Great Britain at the 1956 Summer Olympics, and won a bronze medal at the 1958 Commonwealth Games.

== Early life ==
Tarsey was born on 5 August 1937 in Brentford, Greater London, England.

== Career ==
He represented the English team at the 1954 British Empire and Commonwealth Games held in Vancouver, Canada, where he participated in the 10m Platform diving event.

At the 1956 Summer Olympics in Melbourne, Australia, Tarsey competed in the Men's 3 metre springboard, where he finished 16th, and the Men's 10 metre platform, where he finished 14th.

Tarsey competed for the England team in his second Commonwealth Games winning a bronze medal at Cardiff in 1958, in the men's 3m Springboard event.

== Personal life ==
Tarsey married Jean Biggs in February 1960. They had two sons, and lived in Spain for 18 years.

== Murder ==
The couple were found shot dead "in each other's arms" at their villa in Xalo, near Benidorm, Spain, on 29 March 2015, by friends who had come to Sunday dinner. They had been killed three days earlier.

In July 2016 Driss Drizi, 63, a Moroccan immigrant painter, was jailed for 31 years after confessing to the double murder and striking a plea bargain with prosecutors. Drizi was sentenced to 15 years for each murder, an additional year for illegal possession of a weapon, and ordered to pay 150,000 euros to each of the Tarsey's two sons. Drizi shot the couple following an unspecified row with David Tarsey.
