= John Hayres =

Australian swimmer

Personal information
- Born: 11 April 1938 (age 88)

Sport
- Sport: Swimming
Medal record
Representing Australia
British Empire and Commonwealth Games
Silver medal – second place	1958 Cardiff	110 yd backstroke

John Hayres (born 11 April 1938) is an Australian former swimmer. He competed in the men's 100 metre backstroke at the 1956 Summer Olympics.
