= John Monckton (swimmer) =

Australian swimmer

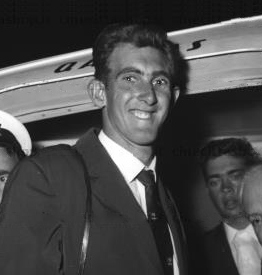
- Monckton in 1960

Personal information
- Full name: John James Monckton
- National team: Australia
- Born: 28 October 1938 Armidale, New South Wales
- Died: 29 June 2017 (aged 78) Nambucca Heads, New South Wales
- Height: 1.92 m (6 ft 4 in)
- Weight: 83 kg (183 lb)

Sport
- Sport: Swimming
- Strokes: Backstroke
Medal record
Representing Australia
Olympic Games
Silver medal – second place	1956 Melbourne	100 m backstroke
British Empire and Commonwealth Games
Gold medal – first place	1958 Cardiff	110 yd backstroke
Gold medal – first place	1958 Cardiff	4×110 yd medley

John James Monckton (28 October 1938 – 29 June 2017) was an Australian backstroke swimmer who won a silver medal in the 100-metre event at the 1956 Summer Olympics in Melbourne. Although he set multiple world records, he never won an Olympic gold medal.

An apprentice carpenter from the New England region of New South Wales, Monckton appeared to be primed to win gold at the 1956 Olympics. At the national team camp in Townsville before the games, he became the first person to swim 400-metre backstroke in under five minutes. Although it was not a regularly contested event at international level, it was a promising sign for the event to be included for medal competition in the Olympics. He also set world records in the 110- and 220-yard freestyle events.

At the Olympics, Monckton was the fastest qualifier in the heats and semifinal, but was upstaged in the final by teammate David Theile.

In the absence of Theile, who had retired after the Olympics to study medicine at university, Monckton dominated backstroke swimming, winning the 110-yard backstroke event at the 1958 British Empire and Commonwealth Games in Cardiff and also the 4×110-yard medley relay. Monckton then prepared for another Olympics in 1960 in Rome, with Theile deferring his studies to defend his Olympic title. Monckton again led the qualifying in the heats and semifinals. However, in the final, he misjudged the turn and broke a finger. He limped home in seventh position, with Theile successfully defending his title. Monckton continued competing in the hope of reaching a third Olympics in 1964, but retired after his performances began to deteriorate.

He married Maureen Giles, an Australian swimmer at the 1956 Olympics.

He was inducted into the Sport Australia Hall of Fame in 1999.

The Monckton Aquatic Centre in his hometown of Armidale is named for him.

== See also ==
- List of Olympic medalists in swimming (men)
- List of Commonwealth Games medallists in swimming (men)
- World record progression 100 metres backstroke
- World record progression 200 metres backstroke

== Bibliography ==
- Andrews, Malcolm (2000). Australia at the Olympic Games. Sydney, New South Wales: ABC Books. p. 303. ISBN 0-7333-0884-8.
