= Athole Still =

Scottish swimmer (born 1933)

Personal information
- Nationality: British (Scottish)
- Born: October 1933 (age 92) Aberdeen, Scotland

Sport
- Sport: Swimming
- Event(s): Freestyle, backstroke
- Club: Gordonians SC, Aberdeen
Medal record
Representing (Scotland)
Commonwealth Games
| Silver medal – second place | 1958 Cardiff | 4×220y relay |

Athole Tosh Still (born October 1933) is a Scottish former swimmer who won a silver medal at the Commonwealth Games.

== Biography ==
Still studies languages at Robert Gordon's College, and was a member of the Gordonians Swimming Club of Aberdeen. In 1952 he was selected by Great Britain for the 1952 Summer Olympics in Helsinki as part of the relay squad but did not start.

He set a British record of 58.5 over 110 yards freestyle record in 1954, and was runner-up in the 110 and 220 yards freestyle finals at the 1955 ASA Championships in Blackpool. He served two years national service in the Royal Air Force.

Still was selected for the 1958 Scottish team for the 1958 British Empire and Commonwealth Games in Cardiff, Wales, where he competed in the 110y freestyle and 4×220y freestyle relay and won a silver medal.

After retiring from competitive swimming he was a swimming and opera correspondent for The Times, before becoming a sports commentator and opening a sports agency.
