= Donald Stringer (fencer) =

British fencer (1928–2007)

Personal information
- Born: 6 October 1928 London, England
- Died: 26 March 2007 (aged 78) England

Sport
- Sport: Fencing

Donald Douglas Stringer (6 October 1928 – 26 March 2007) was a British fencer. He competed in the team sabre event at the 1960 Summer Olympics.
