= Steffen Cranmer =

British sports shooter (born 1934)

Personal information
- Born: Steffen Borries Olrik Cranmer; 8 May 1934 Copenhagen, Denmark

Sport
- Sport: Sports shooting

Steffen Borries Olrik Cranmer (born 8 May 1934) is a British former sports shooter. He competed at the 1952 Summer Olympics, 1956 Summer Olympics and 1960 Summer Olympics.

In 2006, Cranmer suffered a stroke following heart bypass surgery. However, he was able to attend the 2012 Summer Olympics as a spectator. He was later the resident of a care home in Woolwich, London.
