= Sara Barber =

Canadian swimmer (1941–2020)

Personal information
- Born: 25 January 1941 Brantford, Ontario, Canada
- Died: 22 October 2020 (aged 79) Ottawa, Ontario, Canada

Sport
- Sport: Swimming
Medal record
Representing Canada
British Empire and Commonwealth Games
| Silver medal – second place | 1958 Cardiff | 4×110yd freestyle relay |
| Silver medal – second place | 1962 Perth | 4×110yd freestyle relay |
| Bronze medal – third place | 1958 Cardiff | 4×110yd medley relay |
| Bronze medal – third place | 1962 Perth | 4×110yd medley relay |
Pan American Games
| Silver medal – second place | 1959 Chicago | 100m backstroke |
| Silver medal – second place | 1959 Chicago | 4×100m freestyle relay |
| Silver medal – second place | 1959 Chicago | 4×100m medley relay |

Sara Katherine Jenkins (née Barber; 25 January 1941 – 22 October 2020) was a Canadian swimmer. She competed at the 1956 Summer Olympics and the 1960 Summer Olympics. She died of complications of Alzheimer's disease in 2020.
