= Charmain Welsh =

British diver

Personal information
- Nationality: British (English)
- Born: 17 May 1937 (age 89) Easington, Durham, England

Sport
- Sport: Diving
- Event: Springboard
- Club: Durham City
Medal record
Women's diving
Representing Great Britain
European Championships
Silver medal – second place	1958 Budapest	3 m springboard
Representing England
British Empire & Commonwealth Games
Gold medal – first place	1958 Cardiff	3 m springboard
Gold medal – first place	1958 Cardiff	10 m platform

Charmain Isobel Welsh (born 17 May 1937) is a British former diver who competed at the 1952 Summer Olympics and 1956 Summer Olympics.

== Biography ==
Welsh trained in the Dawdon pit pond, near Seaham Harbour, which was an open air swimming pool. She attended Durham High School and at the age of 13 was the Durham and Northumberland swimming champion. At the 1952 Olympic Games in Helsinki, Welsh participated in the springboard event.

She represented the English team at the 1954 British Empire and Commonwealth Games held in Vancouver, Canada and won double gold in the 3 metres springboard and the 10 metres platform events at the 1958 British Empire and Commonwealth Games in Cardiff.

Welsh also dived at the 1956 Olympic Games in Melbourne but retired before the 1960 Olympics citing too much "politics" within the sport. She later coached in Durham and in 2013 received a British Swimming lifetime achievement award for Outstanding Contribution.
