= Peter Squires (diver) =

English diver

Personal information
- Full name: Peter John Squires
- Nationality: British (English)
- Born: 28 May 1936 Mumbai, Maharashtra, India
- Died: 16 September 2011 (aged 75)
- Height: 168 cm (5 ft 6 in)
- Weight: 63 kg (139 lb)

Sport
- Sport: Diving
- Club: Highgate

Peter John Squires (28 May 1936 – 16 September 2011) was a male diver from England who competed at the 1960 Summer Olympics.

== Biography ==
Squires represented the England team in the 3 metres springboard event at the 1958 British Empire and Commonwealth Games in Cardiff, Wales.

At the 1960 Olympic Games in Rome, Squires represented Great Britain in the springboard event.

He was associated to the Highgate Diving Club.
