= Alva Colquhoun =

Australian swimmer (1942–2025)

Personal information
- Full name: Alva Merlin Colquhoun
- National team: Australia
- Born: 28 February 1942 Brisbane, Queensland
- Died: 1 March 2025 (aged 83)
- Height: 1.69 m (5 ft 7 in)
- Weight: 61 kg (134 lb)

Sport
- Sport: Swimming
- Strokes: Freestyle
Medal record
Women's swimming
Representing Australia
Olympic Games
Silver medal – second place	1960 Rome	4×100 m freestyle
British Empire and Commonwealth Games
Gold medal – first place	1958 Cardiff	4×110 yd freestyle relay
Bronze medal – third place	1958 Cardiff	110 yd freestyle

Alva Merlin Colquhoun (married name Wyatt, 28 February 1942 – 1 March 2025) was an Australian freestyle and butterfly swimmer of the 1950s, who won a silver medal in the 4×100-metre freestyle relay at the 1960 Summer Olympics in Rome. She is perhaps best known for resolving a dispute at a team meeting during the Rome Olympics.

Making her first appearance for Australia at the 1958 British Empire and Commonwealth Games in Cardiff, Wales, Colquhoun combined with Dawn Fraser, Lorraine Crapp and Sandra Morgan to win the 4×110-yard freestyle relay. In the 110-yard freestyle, she was beaten into third place by her teammates Fraser and Crapp. In Rome, she anchored the team of Fraser, Crapp and Ilsa Konrads to a silver medal, trailing the American team by 2.4 seconds. However, she was in the spotlight when during a team meeting, officials had ordered Fraser to swim the butterfly leg in the 4×100-metre medley relay preliminaries in place of the first-choice butterfly swimmer Jan Andrew, who was ordered to rest ahead of her individual event. Fraser refused, hitting Andrew with a pillow. It was only when Colquhoun volunteered that the dispute was resolved. However, she was replaced by Andrew in the final.

Colquhoun was married with two children and resided in Baddaginnie, Victoria. She died on 1 March 2025, a day after her 83rd birthday.

== See also ==
- List of Olympic medalists in swimming (women)
- World record progression 4 × 100 metres freestyle relay
