= William Holmes (cyclist) =

British cyclist

Personal information
- Nicknames: Bill, Billy
- Born: 14 January 1936 (age 90) Kingston upon Hull, England

Cycling career
- Sport: Cycling

Amateur team
- Hull Thursday RC
Medal record
Men's cycling
Representing Great Britain
Olympic Games
Silver medal – second place	1956 Melbourne	Team road race

William Holmes (born 14 January 1936), known as Bill Holmes or Billy Holmes, is a former British cyclist.

== Biography ==
Holmes competed at the 1956 Summer Olympics and the 1960 Summer Olympics. He won a silver medal at the 1956 Olympics in the team road race event.

He the England team in the road race event at the 1958 British Empire and Commonwealth Games in Cardiff, Wales.
