= Frances Hogben =

British swimmer (born 1937)

Personal information
- Nationality: British (English)
- Born: 16 October 1937 (age 88) Portsmouth, England

Sport
- Sport: Swimming
- Event: Freestyle
- Club: Arbroath SC

Frances M. Hogben (born 16 October 1937) is a British former swimmer who competed in two events at the 1956 Summer Olympics.

== Biography ==
At the 1956 Summer Olympics in Melbourne, Australia, she competed in the 100m freestyle and relay events.

Hogben was selected for the 1958 Scottish team for the 1958 British Empire and Commonwealth Games in Cardiff, Wales, where she competed in the 110 yards freestyle.
