= Brian Phelps (diver) =

British diver

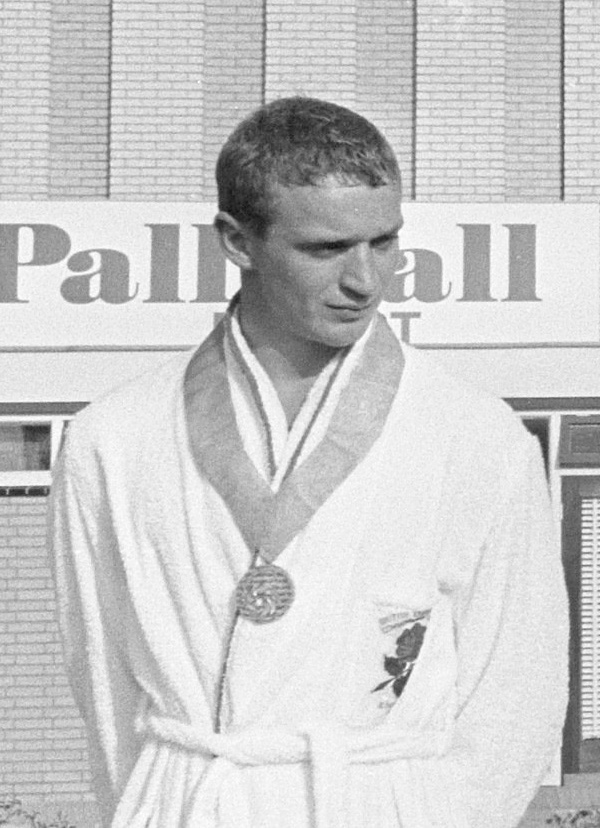
- Phelps at the 1966 European championships

Personal information
- Born: 21 April 1944 (age 82) Chelmsford, England
- Height: 1.68 m (5 ft 6 in)
- Weight: 67 kg (148 lb)

Sport
- Sport: Diving
Medal record
Representing Great Britain
Olympic Games
Bronze medal – third place	1960 Rome	Platform
European Championships
Gold medal – first place	1958 Budapest	Platform
Gold medal – first place	1962 Leipzig	Platform
Silver medal – second place	1966 Utrecht	Platform
Representing England
British Empire & Commonwealth Games
Silver medal – second place	1958 Cardiff	10m Platform
Gold medal – first place	1962 Perth	10m Platform
Gold medal – first place	1962 Perth	3m Springboard
Gold medal – first place	1966 Kingston	10m Platform
Gold medal – first place	1966 Kingston	3m Springboard

Brian Eric Phelps (born 21 April 1944) is a former diver from England and a convicted sex offender.

== Diving career ==
He won the gold medal in the 10 metre platform at the 1958 European Championships in Budapest, Hungary, at the age of 14 and again in 1962 at age 18. He represented the England team at the 1958 British Empire and Commonwealth Games in the 10m platform event, winning a silver medal.

He competed in the 1960 Summer Olympics in Rome at the age of 16, where he took bronze in the 10 metre platform event.

He went on to win four gold medals at the Commonwealth, with double gold in the 1962 and 1966 games on the 10 metre platform and the 3 metre springboard events.

Phelps then went on to found the OLGA trampoline club along with his wife, Monica Rutherford, an Olympic artistic gymnast. The club, based in the South of England, has generated many international performers since its opening. These include current coach Nigel Rendell whose son, Luke Rendell, is a current international performer and Tom and Hannah Lewis, both of whom have won major titles, Hannah's being the 2003 European championships with Tom's the 2005 World Age Championship win. Brian Camp, one of Phelps's main prodigies performs regularly with the world's best. Another club member has been Claire Wright. Other OLGA performers include Danielle Pietruszka, Melissa Eryilmaz and Katy Ianson.

Phelps is now retired and before his imprisonment was living in France. He is a former commentator on diving for the Eurosport television channel.

== Indecent assault and indecency case ==
Phelps was remanded in custody at Bournemouth Magistrates' Court in January 2008 after being charged with rape, attempted rape and 19 indecent assaults on two girls. The attacks plus 19 indecent assaults took place from 1976 to 1986 – while the girls were between six and 15.

Before Bournemouth magistrates on 6 February 2008, he was further charged with six counts of indecently assaulting a girl under 14 and one count of gross indecency, these offences being alleged to have taken place between 1975 and 1980. He next appeared at the Bournemouth Crown Court on 25 March.

At his trial Phelps admitted to 42 charges of indecent assault and indecency. He was sentenced to 9 years imprisonment, and served 6 years in prison before being released on licence. He will be on the sex offenders register for life.

In 2023, it was claimed that there were at least 12 further victims.

== See also ==
- Paul Hickson
