= Gary Winram =

Australian swimmer (1936–2022)

Personal information
- Full name: Gary Francis Winram
- National team: Australia
- Born: 5 August 1936 Sydney, Australia
- Died: 29 May 2022 (aged 85) Sunshine Coast, Queensland, Australia

Sport
- Sport: Swimming
- Strokes: Freestyle
- Club: Bondi ASC
Medal record
Men's swimming
Representing Australia
Commonwealth Games
Silver medal – second place	1958 Cardiff	1650 yd freestyle
Bronze medal – third place	1958 Cardiff	440 yd freestyle

Gary Francis Winram (5 August 1936 – 29 May 2022) was an Australian competitive swimmer who specialised primarily in middle- and long-distance freestyle events. As a 20-year-old, he competed in two events at the 1956 Summer Olympics in Melbourne. He finished sixth in the men's 400-metre freestyle final (4:34.9), and eighth in the final of the men's 1500-metre freestyle (19:06.2). Two years later at the 1958 British Empire and Commonwealth Games in Cardiff, Wales, Winram won a silver medal in the 1650-yard freestyle, and a bronze in the 440-yard freestyle.

At the age of 16, he was the first Australian to swim the 1650-yard freestyle in under 19 minutes.

== See also ==
- List of Commonwealth Games medallists in swimming (men)
