= Joe Wheater =

Olympic British sport shooter

Personal information
- Born: 6 October 1918 Selby, England
- Died: 24 November 2011 (aged 93) Gainsborough, England

Sport
- Sport: Sports shooting

Joe Wheater (6 October 1918 – 24 November 2011) was a British sport shooter who competed in the 1956 Summer Olympics, in the 1960 Summer Olympics, and in the 1964 Summer Olympics.
