= Brian Wilkinson =

Australian swimmer (1938–2026)

Personal information
- Full name: Brian Harold Wilkinson
- Born: 12 February 1938 Muswellbrook, New South Wales, Australia
- Died: 27 April 2026 (aged 88) Sydney, New South Wales, Australia

Sport
- Sport: Swimming
Medal record
Men's swimming
Representing Australia
British Empire and Commonwealth Games
Gold medal – first place	1958 Cardiff	4×220 yd freestyle relay
Bronze medal – third place	1958 Cardiff	220 yd butterfly

Brian Harold Wilkinson (12 February 1938 – 27 April 2026) was an Australian swimmer. He won a gold medal at the 1958 British Empire and Commonwealth Games in Cardiff, Wales, as a member of the Australian men’s 4×220-yard freestyle relay team.

Wilkinson also competed in the men's 200 metre butterfly at the 1956 Summer Olympics. Wilkinson was butterfly specialist and set a world record in the men’s 110y butterfly at Sydney in 1958.

He was Australian swim team coach at the 1996 Atlanta Olympic Games - becoming the second Australian Olympic swimmer to be selected as an Olympic swim coach. In 2001, he won the Open Water Coach of the Year Award from the Australian Swimming Coaches and Teachers Association.

Wilkinson died in Sydney on 27 April 2026, at the age of 88.
