= Michael Straus =

British fencer

Personal information
- Born: 16 May 1924 Berlin, Germany
- Died: 11 May 1977 (aged 52) Wandsworth, London, England

Sport
- Sport: Fencing

Michael Straus (16 May 1924 – 11 May 1977) was a British fencer. He competed in the team sabre event at the 1960 Summer Olympics.
