= Graham Sykes =

English swimmer (1937–2008)

Personal information
- Nationality: British (English)
- Born: 20 July 1937 Coventry, England
- Died: 26 November 2008 (aged 71) Stoneleigh, England

Sport
- Sport: Swimming
- Event(s): Backstroke, Freestyle
- Club: Coventry SC
Medal record
Swimming
Representing England
British Empire & Commonwealth Games
Bronze medal – third place	1958 Cardiff	medley relay
Gold medal – first place	1962 Perth	110y backstroke
Silver medal – second place	1962 Perth	medley relay

Graham Sykes (20 July 1937 – 26 November 2008) was an English competitive swimmer.

== Biography ==
Born in Coventry, he represented Great Britain in the 1956 Summer Olympics and 1960 Summer Olympics.

In May 1958 he took part in the Empire Games trials in Blackpool and subsequently represented the English team at the 1958 British Empire and Commonwealth Games in Cardiff, Wales. He competed in the 110 yards backstroke event and helped England secure a bronze medal in the final of the men's 4 x 110 yards medley relay, with Christopher Walkden, Graham Symonds and Neil McKechnie.

Four years later he won a gold medal in the 110 yards backstroke and a silver medal in the medley relay at the 1962 British Empire and Commonwealth Games in Perth, Western Australia. At the ASA National British Championships he won the 110 yards backstroke title five times (1956, 1957, 1958, 1959, 1960).

== See also ==
- List of Commonwealth Games medallists in swimming (men)
