= Christine Harris (swimmer) =

British swimmer

Personal information
- Full name: Christine Robertson Stuart Harris
- Nationality: British (Scottish)
- Born: 24 January 1942 (age 84) Dunfermline, Scotland
- Height: 170 cm (5 ft 7 in)
- Weight: 68 kg (150 lb)

Sport
- Sport: Swimming
- Event: Freestyle
- Club: Carnegie Swimming Club

Christine Robertson Stuart Harris (born 24 January 1942) is a British former swimmer, who competed at the 1960 Summer Olympics.

== Biography ==
In 1958, Harris lived at 24 Pittencrieff Street in Dunfermline and attended Queen Anne Secondary School. She was a member of the Carnegie Swimming Club of Dunfermline.

Harris was selected for the 1958 Scottish team for the 1958 British Empire and Commonwealth Games in Cardiff, Wales, where she competed in the 110 yards freestyle.

At the 1960 Olympic Games, Harris competed in the women's 4 × 100 metre freestyle relay.
