= Graham Symonds =

English swimmer (1937–2006)

Personal information
- Born: 21 March 1936 Coventry, England
- Died: 2 June 2006 (aged 70) Essex, England

Sport
- Sport: Swimming
- Event(s): Butterfly, Backstroke, Breaststroke, Freestyle
- Club: Coventry SC
Medal record
Swimming
Representing England
British Empire & Commonwealth Games
Silver medal – second place	1958 Cardiff	220y butterfly
Bronze medal – third place	1958 Cardiff	medley relay
Representing Great Britain
European Championships
Bronze medal – third place	1958 Budapest	200 m butterfly

Graham Henry Symonds (21 March 1937 – 2 June 2006) was an English swimmer who competed at the 1956 Summer Olympics.

== Biography ==
Symonds was born in Coventry and studied at the Coventry Art School. He was first coached by his father Sid Symonds, a semi-professional football player.

At the 1956 Olympic Games in Melbourne, Symonds represented Great Britain in the 200 metres butterfly event but did not reach the finals. He did however win a bronze medal in the 200 metres butterfly at the 1958 European Aquatics Championships.

In May 1958 he took part in the Empire Games trials in Blackpool and subsequently represented the English team at the 1958 British Empire and Commonwealth Games in Cardiff, Wales. He competed in the 220 yards butterfly, event, winning a silver medal and helped England claim the bronze medal in the final of the men's 4 x 110 yards medley relay, with Graham Sykes, Christopher Walkden and Neil McKechnie.

He won the 1954 ASA National Championship 440 yards freestyle title and the 220 yards butterfly title in 1955.

After retiring from swimming he worked at the technical publications department of the Armstrong Siddeley's aircraft division. He then designed tractors at Massey Ferguson, worked for Chrysler Rootes, and in 1967 joined Ford. In the 1980s–90s he worked in Dearborn, Michigan, US, designing medium and large trucks, such as Ford Transit. During that time he also competed in masters swimming. He returned to UK in 1998 to assume the post of assistant director of design of small and medium Ford vehicles at Dunton Wayletts, Essex. He retired in 2002 and died in 2006 in Essex, leaving wife Ina and children Heather, Brett and Andrea and brother Robert Bruce Symonds.

== See also ==
- List of Commonwealth Games medallists in swimming (men)
