= Neil McKechnie =

British swimmer

Personal information
- Nationality: British (English)
- Born: 28 April 1939 Wallasey, England
- Died: 6 June 2006 (aged 67) Peterborough, England

Sport
- Sport: Swimming
- Strokes: Freestyle
- Club: Wallasey SC
Medal record
Swimming
Representing England
British Empire & Commonwealth Games
| Bronze medal – third place | 1958 Cardiff | medley relay |

Neil John McKechnie (28 April 1939 – 6 June 2006) was a British swimmer. He competed in two events at the 1956 Summer Olympics.

== Biography ==
In May 1958 he took part in the Empire Games trials in Blackpool and subsequently represented the English team at the 1958 British Empire and Commonwealth Games in Cardiff, Wales. He competed in the 110 yards freestyle event and helped England claim the bronze medal in the final of the men's 4 x 110 yards medley relay, with Graham Symonds, Christopher Walkden and Graham Sykes.

He won the 1956 and 1957 ASA National Championship 110 yards freestyle titles, the 1955, 1956 and 1957 ASA National Championship 220 yards freestyle titles and the 1955 and 1956 ASA National Championship 440 yards freestyle titles.
