= Kenneth Williams (swimmer) =

British-Canadian swimmer

Personal information
- Born: 17 February 1937 (age 89)

Sport
- Sport: Swimming
Medal record
Representing Canada
British Empire and Commonwealth Games
| Silver medal – second place | 1958 Cardiff | 4×110yd medley relay |
| Bronze medal – third place | 1958 Cardiff | 4×220yd freestyle relay |

Kenneth Williams (born 17 February 1937) is a British-Canadian former swimmer. He competed in two events at the 1956 Summer Olympics for Great Britain. Later, he would represent Canada at the Commonwealth Games.
