= Ann Long =

English diver

Personal information
- Nationality: British (English)
- Born: 6 July 1936 (age 89) Ilford, London, England
- Height: 157 cm (5 ft 2 in)
- Weight: 51 kg (112 lb)

Sport
- Sport: Diving
- Event: Springboard / Platform
- Club: Ilford
Medal record
Diving
Representing England
British Empire & Commonwealth Games
Gold medal – first place	1954 Vancouver	3m springboard
Bronze medal – third place	1954 Vancouver	10m platform
Silver medal – second place	1958 Cardiff	10m platform

Phyllis Ann Long (born 6 July 1936) is a female former diver who competed at three Olympic Games.

== Biography ==
Long's first experience of an Olympics was as a 12 year old who travelled with a friend to Wembley and sneaked in to watch the diving final of the 1948 Summer Olympics. Four years later Long was competing in Helsinki at the 1952 Summer Olympics, she reached the final in the 3 metre springboard and finished in eighth place, this was followed up with a fifth place in the 10 metre platform. At the 1956 Summer Olympics she again reach the final in both events, finishing sixth 3 metre springboard, and seventh in the 10 metre platform. Long's third and final Olympic appearance was at the 1960 Summer Olympics and for the third time she reached both finals, finishing 8th in the 10 metre platform and 7th in the 3 metre springboard.

She represented England and won a gold medal and bronze medal in the 3 metres springboard and 10 metres platform respectively at the 1954 British Empire and Commonwealth Games in Vancouver, Canada. Four years later she won a silver medal in the 10 metres platform event for the England team at the 1958 British Empire and Commonwealth Games in Cardiff.

After her diving days were finished Long married Ron Pearce and they had seven children, she became a primary school teacher and also introduced children to diving in her local pool, and when in her seventies she still owned a pub which is run by one of her daughters.
