= Anita Lonsbrough =

British swimmer (born 1941)

Anita Lonsbrough MBE
Personal information
- Born: 10 August 1941 (age 85) York, England

Sport
- Sport: Swimming
Medal record
Women's swimming
Representing Great Britain
Olympic Games
| Gold medal – first place | 1960 Rome | 200 m breaststroke |
European Championships
| Gold medal – first place | 1962 Leipzig | 200 m breaststroke |
| Silver medal – second place | 1958 Budapest | 200 m breaststroke |
| Silver medal – second place | 1962 Leipzig | 400 m individual medley |
| Bronze medal – third place | 1958 Budapest | 4×100 m medley |
| Bronze medal – third place | 1962 Leipzig | 4×100 m medley |
Representing England
British Empire and Commonwealth Games
| Gold medal – first place | 1958 Cardiff | 220 yd breaststroke |
| Gold medal – first place | 1958 Cardiff | 4×110 yd medley |
| Gold medal – first place | 1962 Perth | 110 yd breaststroke |
| Gold medal – first place | 1962 Perth | 220 yd breaststroke |
| Gold medal – first place | 1962 Perth | 440 yd individual medley |
| Silver medal – second place | 1962 Perth | 4×110 yd medley |

Anita Lonsbrough, MBE (born 10 August 1941), later known by her married name Anita Porter, is an English former swimmer from Great Britain who won a gold medal at the 1960 Summer Olympics.

== Swimming career ==
At the 1958 British Empire and Commonwealth Games in Cardiff she won gold in the 220 yards breaststroke and the medley relay.

At the 1960 Summer Olympics in Rome, on 27 August 1960, at the age of 19, she won gold in the 200 m breaststroke in 2:49.5, ahead of West Germany's Wiltrud Urselmann (2:50.0), setting a new world record time. She was one of only two GB gold medallists that year, the other being Don Thompson in the 50 kilometre walk.

She would also be the last British woman to win Olympic gold in swimming until Rebecca Adlington gained the gold in the 2008 Summer Olympics, 48 years later.

At the 1962 British Empire and Commonwealth Games in Perth she won three golds: 110 yards breaststroke; 220 yards breaststroke; and 440 yards individual medley.

She won the 1963 ASA National Championship 220 yards freestyle title, and was a five times winner of the National Championship 220 yards breaststroke title, which included a world record time in the 1962 final. She also won the 440 yards medley title twice in 1963 and 1964.

In 1964 she competed in the Tokyo Olympic Games, finishing 7th in the 400 metres individual medley. She was also scheduled to compete in the 400 metres freestyle, but did not start.

== Biography ==
Lonsbrough was born in York to Stanley and Maud, and spent her childhood in India where her father, a Sergeant Major in the Coldstream Guards, was posted. After the family’s return to Yorkshire, she was educated at St. Joseph's Catholic College, Bradford, a girls' direct grant grammar school. She became a Treasurer's Office clerk employed at the Huddersfield Town Hall. She won her first gold medal for swimming in the 1958 British Empire and Commonwealth Games in Cardiff. Five world records and seven gold medals followed until her retirement in 1964. At one time she held the Olympic, Empire and European titles at the same time.

She is married to cycling commentator and former leading British professional track cyclist Hugh Porter; they met while travelling to Tokyo for the 1964 Summer Olympics and married on Thursday 17 June 1965 at St Peter's Church, Huddersfield. The couple live in Tettenhall, Wolverhampton.

She taught swimming at the P.E. Department at Ounsdale High School. Lonsbrough worked as a swimming commentator for BBC radio for many years alongside Peter Jones. She is currently a sports commentator and journalist for The Daily Telegraph, under the name Anita Lonsbrough-Porter.

== Honours ==
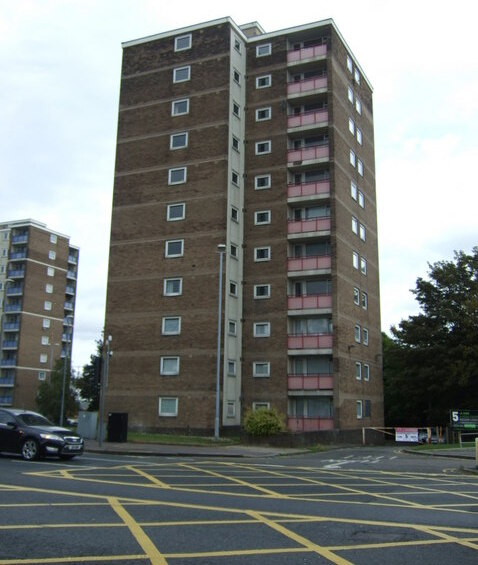
The Lonsborough Flats in Huddersfield, named after Lonsbrough, were demolished in 2016.

She was the first woman winner of BBC Sports Personality of the Year in 1962. and was the last person to win the 'Sports Outlook' trophy Northern Sports Star of the year award in 1962.

She was awarded an MBE in 1963 for services to swimming.

Anita Lonsbrough was the first female flag bearer for Great Britain at the Summer Games when she carried the flag in the opening ceremony of the 1964 Summer Olympics, after previously turning down the role at the 1960 Summer Olympics.

In 1983 she was inducted into the International Swimming Hall of Fame.

== See also ==
- List of members of the International Swimming Hall of Fame
- List of Olympic medalists in swimming (women)
- World record progression 200 metres breaststroke
- World record progression 4 × 100 metres medley relay

Awards
| Preceded by Stirling Moss | BBC Sports Personality of the Year; 1962 | Succeeded by Dorothy Hyman |
