= Ian Black (swimmer) =

Scottish swimmer (born 1941)

Personal information
- Born: 27 June 1941 (age 85) Inverness, Scotland
- Height: 1.75 m (5 ft 9 in)
- Weight: 72 kg (159 lb; 11.3 st)

Sport
- Sport: Swimming
- Strokes: Butterfly, freestyle, medley
- College team: Robert Gordon College
Medal record
Men's swimming
Representing Scotland
British Empire and Commonwealth Games
Gold medal – first place	1958 Cardiff	220-yard butterfly
Silver medal – second place	1958 Cardiff	440-yard freestyle
Silver medal – second place	1958 Cardiff	4×220-yard freestyle
Representing Great Britain
European Championships
Gold medal – first place	1958 Budapest	400 m freestyle
Gold medal – first place	1958 Budapest	1500 m freestyle
Gold medal – first place	1958 Budapest	200 m butterfly

Ian MacIntosh Black (born 27 June 1941) is a Scottish former competitive swimmer who represented Great Britain in international competition, including the Olympics and European championships, and Scotland in the Commonwealth Games, during the late 1950s and early 1960s.

== Swimming career ==
Black was BBC Sports Personality of the Year in 1958 at the age of only 17, and is still to date the youngest winner of the award. He earned the BBC honour by winning three gold medals in the 400- and 1500-metre freestyle events, as well as the 200-metre butterfly, at the 1958 European Championships in Budapest, Hungary. In the same year, he also won a gold and two silver medals for Scotland at the 1958 British Empire and Commonwealth Games in Cardiff, Wales; gold in the 220-yard butterfly, silver in the 440-yard freestyle, and silver in the 4×220-yard freestyle relay.

In 1959 he set a new world record in the 400-metre individual medley, 5 minutes 8.8 seconds, a record that would stand for just over a year until broken by swimmer American George Harrison in 1960.

Black qualified to represent Great Britain in three events at the 1960 Summer Olympics in Rome. In the event final of the men's 400-metre freestyle he was placed fourth, posting the same time as Australian John Konrads (4:21.8), but the judges awarded the bronze medal to Konrads. He was also a member of the British teams in the 4x200-metre freestyle relay and 4x100-metre medley relay events, placing fourth and seventh in the finals, respectively.

When competing for Great Britain, he would wear a MacGregor tartan dressing gown poolside. As well as excelling in the water, he was also a formidable rugby union player. In 2002 he became one of the first fifty Scottish men and women inducted into the Scottish Sports Hall of Fame.

He won multiple Scottish titles, the 1958 and 1959 ASA National Championship 110 yards freestyle titles, the 1958 and 1959 ASA National Championship 220 yards freestyle titles, the 1958 and 1959 ASA National Championship 440 yards freestyle titles and the 220 yards butterfly title in 1958 and 1959.

== Personal life ==
Black attended Aberdeen University, where he was awarded a Master of Arts and a Certificate in Education. In the late 1970s he became head teacher of Seafield Primary School in Elgin. He taught in Canada and he became headmaster of St Christopher's prep school in Bahrain. In the early 1980s he was headmaster of Sek Kong Primary School in Hong Kong, before moving to Aberlour House School 1987–89. He later returned to his former school, Robert Gordon's College in Aberdeen, as headmaster of the Junior School, and retired in 2004.

His coached his brother Gordon Black who was also an international swimmer for Scotland.

== See also ==
- List of Commonwealth Games medallists in swimming (men)
- World record progression 400 metres individual medley

Records
Preceded by Vladimir Strushanov	Men's 400-metre individual medley world record-holder (long course); 6 June 1959 – 24 June 1960	Succeeded by George Harrison
Awards
Preceded by Dai Rees	BBC Sports Personality of the Year; 1958	Succeeded by John Surtees
