= Judy Grinham =

British swimmer, Olympic gold medallist, and world record-holder

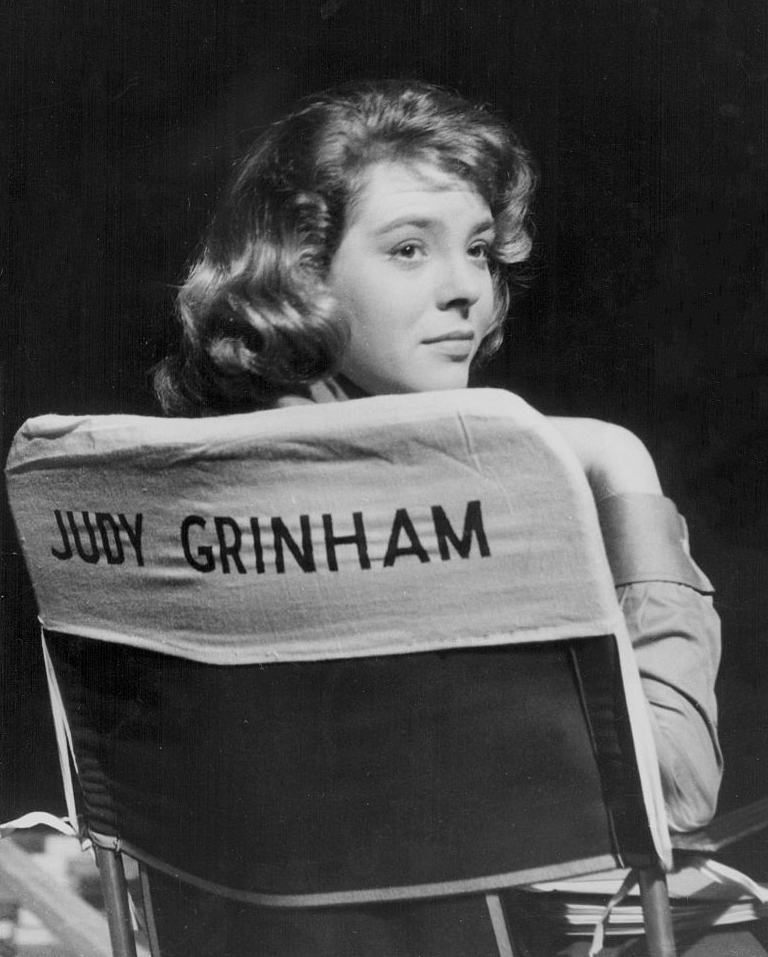
- Grinham in 1958

Personal information
- Full name: Judith Brenda Grinham
- Nickname: "Judy"
- National team: Great Britain
- Born: March 5, 1939 (age 87) Neasden, England

Sport
- Sport: Swimming
- Strokes: Backstroke, freestyle
- Club: Hampstead Ladies SC
Medal record
Representing Great Britain
Olympic Games
Gold medal – first place	1956 Melbourne	100 m backstroke
European Championships
Gold medal – first place	1958 Budapest	100 m backstroke
Silver medal – second place	1958 Budapest	4×100 m freestyle
Bronze medal – third place	1958 Budapest	100 m freestyle
Bronze medal – third place	1958 Budapest	4×100 m medley
Representing England
Commonwealth Games
Gold medal – first place	1958 Cardiff	110 yd backstroke
Gold medal – first place	1958 Cardiff	4×110 yd medley relay
Bronze medal – third place	1958 Cardiff	4×110 yd freestyle

Judith Brenda Grinham MBE (born 5 March 1939), also known by her married name Judith Roe or also by her former married name Judith Rowley, is an English former competitive swimmer who represented Great Britain in the Olympics and European championships, and competed for England in the Commonwealth Games. Grinham is an Olympic gold medallist, Commonwealth and European champion, and former world record-holder. In 1956 and 1958 she was chosen as The Daily Express Sportswoman of the Year. In 1958 she became the first woman in any sport to hold/win World, Olympic, European and Commonwealth titles.

== Early life ==
Grinham was born in the London suburb of Hampstead and grew up in Neasden. She studied at the Convent of Jesus & Mary, Harlesden, London NW10.

== Personal life ==
Judy was born in 1939, her father, Norman, left as part of the BEF for war six months after she was born. He survived Dunkirk but narrowly escaped the German attacks. On his return from France he was posted to Egypt to see out the remainder of the war, where he continued to swim in his spare time.

When he returned in 1946, he built a relationship with his daughter by teaching her to swim.

It became apparent quite early on that Judy had a natural talent and the determination to succeed. Judy's parent's then made the decision when she was 10 years old to invest in their daughter's future. Flora (her mother) and Norman (her father) sold their family home to fund her professional coaching (there was no lottery funding for Olympians in those days and they trained in public pools). 7 years later that investment paid off and Judy won Olympic Gold in the Melbourne in 1956 and instantly became Britains 'Golden Girl'.

Judy Grinham retired from competitive swimming in 1959, her connection to her sport continued as part of the Daily Express sports journalistic team covering swimming at the 1960 Olympics in Rome.

She continued to work on an amateur basis making brief public appearances and coaching swimming (like her father before her) at Hampstead Ladies Swimming club then at Ruislip/Northwood swimming club at Highgrove pools in Eastcote in Middlesex, where her son Keith and daughter Ali, learnt to swim.

In later years she focused on her altruism working for Dr Barnardo's to ensure disadvantaged kids had the best possible start in life

She was finally awarded the MBE for her services to her sport in the Queens birthday honours 50 years after she won her Olympic Gold.

She prioritized athletic participation over public recognition. During her career, regulations required athletes to maintain amateur status, which precluded direct financial compensation for appearances. Any funds received were mandated to be returned to the Amateur Swimming Association (ASA).

She married Pat Rowley in Neasden in 1960, in St Catherine's Church. They had two children, Keith Rowley (born in June 1961) and Ali Grinham (nee Heeks/Rowley) (born in December 1962). They lived in Northwood in Middlesex. She has five grandchildren. Daniel Page, Georgia Heeks, Tahara-Jayne Rusden Rowley and Ruby Heeks.

In 1977 she got divorced and in 1979 married Michael Roe (who had 4 children). She also has five step-grandchildren.

She lived for many years in Abbots Langley, Hertfordshire but moved to Downderry, Cornwall to live by the sea and sail with her husband Mike. After his death she moved back to Abbots Langley and in 2024 she emigrated to spend her final years with her son, Keith in New Zealand where she currently resides.

== Career ==
Grinham competed in the 1956 Olympic Games in Melbourne, Australia, winning the 100-metre backstroke, setting a world record of 1:12.9. She became the first Briton to win an Olympic swimming gold since Lucy Morton in 1924.

Grinham competed in the 1958 British Empire and Commonwealth Games in Cardiff, Wales, and won the 100-metre backstroke in 1:11.9. This too was a world record. She went on to win a second gold medal as a member of the winning British team in the 4×100-metre medley team at the 1958 European Championships in Budapest, Hungary, and won an individual gold in the 100-metre backstroke. She became the first woman in any sport to hold World, Olympic, Commonwealth and European gold medals at the same time. She won the 1958 ASA National Championship 110 yards freestyle title, the 1957 ASA National Championship 220 yards freestyle title and the 110 yards backstroke title three times (1955, 1956, 1958).

Grinham retired from competitions in 1959. The same year she appeared as a PT instructor in the Associated British Technicolor wartime service comedy film Operation Bullshine, alongside stars Donald Sinden, Barbara Murray and Carole Lesley, but never made another film.

Grinham was inducted into the International Swimming Hall of Fame as an Honour Swimmer in 1981.

In 2007 she was appointed a Member of the Order of the British Empire (MBE) in the Queen's Birthday Honours list, 50 years after winning gold in Melbourne.

== See also ==
- List of members of the International Swimming Hall of Fame
- Great Britain and Northern Ireland at the 1956 Summer Olympics
- List of Olympic medalists in swimming (women)
- World record progression 4 × 100 metres medley relay
