= John Brockway (swimmer) =

Welsh swimmer

Personal information
- Full name: William John Brockway
- National team: Great Britain
- Born: 8 October 1928 Bristol, England
- Died: 26 July 2009 (aged 80) Newport, Wales

Sport
- Sport: Swimming
- Strokes: Backstroke
Medal record
Men's swimming
Representing Wales
British Empire Games
Silver medal – second place	1950 Auckland	110 yd backstroke
Gold medal – first place	1954 Vancouver	110 yd backstroke
Representing Great Britain
European Championships (LC)
Bronze medal – third place	1954 Turin	100 m backstroke

William John Brockway (8 October 1928 – 26 July 2009) was a male Welsh competitive swimmer.

== Swimming career ==
Brockway represented Great Britain at the Olympics and European championships, and Wales at the British Empire Games, during the late 1940s and 1950s. Brockway was a backstroke specialist who served as the captain of the British swimming team at the 1952 and 1956 Olympics.

He was born in Bristol, England, and died in Newport, Wales.

Brockway made his Olympic debut at the 1948 Olympic Games in London, where he advanced to the final of the men's 100-metre backstroke, finishing seventh in a time of 1:09.2. He swam the same event at the 1952 Olympic Games in Helsinki, and 1956 Olympic Games in Melbourne, but was unable to progress to the event final despite swimming faster times on each occasion.

Competing for Wales at the 1950 British Empire Games in Auckland, New Zealand, he won the silver medal in the men's 110-yard backstroke in 1:08.0. He then went on to win the gold medal in the same event at the 1954 British Empire and Commonwealth Games in Vancouver, Canada, swimming a time of 1:06.5. In the 1958 British Empire and Commonwealth Games in Cardiff, Wales, he finished sixth in the 110-yard backstroke, and sixth as a member of the Welsh men's team in the 4×110-yard medley relay.

At the ASA National British Championships he won the 110 yards backstroke title seven times (1948, 1949, 1950, 1951, 1953, 1954, 1955).

== Personal life ==
Following his swimming career, Brockway became an engineer at steelworks in the Newport area of South Wales.

== See also ==
- List of Commonwealth Games medallists in swimming (men)
