= Swimming at the 1956 Summer Olympics – Women's 4 × 100 metre freestyle relay =

Women's 4 × 100 metre freestyle relay at the Games of the XVI Olympiad
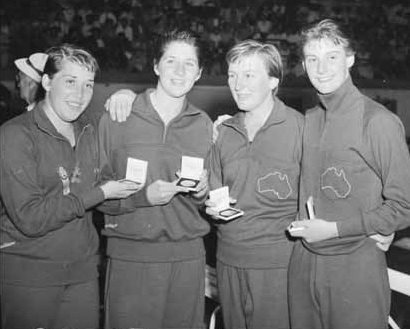
- The Australian gold medal winning quartet: Sandra Morgan, Dawn Fraser, Lorraine Crapp and Faith Leech.
- Venue: Melbourne Sports and Entertainment Centre
- Dates: 4 December 1956 (heats); 6 December 1956 (final)
- Competitors: 45 from 10 nations
- Teams: 10
- Winning time: 4:17.1 WR

Medalists
1st place, gold medalist(s)		Dawn Fraser, Faith Leech, Sandra Morgan, Lorraine Crapp, Margaret Gibson*, Elizabeth Fraser*	Australia
2nd place, silver medalist(s)		Sylvia Ruuska, Shelley Mann, Nancy Simons, Joan Rosazza, Betty Brey*, Kay Knapp*, Marley Shriver	United States
3rd place, bronze medalist(s)		Natalie Myburgh, Susan Roberts, Moira Abernethy, Jeanette Myburgh *Swimmer who participated in the heats only. Under 1956 Olympic rules, they did not receive a medal.	South Africa

The women's 4 × 100 metre freestyle relay event at the 1956 Olympic Games took place on 4 and 6 December. This swimming event used freestyle as a relay, with swimmers typically using the front crawl. Because an Olympic size swimming pool is 50 metres long, each of the four swimmers completed two lengths of the pool. The first swimmer had to touch the wall before the second could leave the starting block; timing of the starts was thus important.

== Results ==
=== Heats ===
Heat One

Place	Swimmers	Time	Notes
1	Natalie Myburgh, Susan Roberts, Moira Abernethy and Jeanette Myburgh (RSA)	4:26.8	
2	Betty Brey, Nancy Simons, Kay Knapp and Marley Shriver (USA)	4:27.3	
3	Ingrid Künzel, Hertha Haase, Kati Jansen and Birgit Klomp (GER)	4:27.5	
4	Frances Hogben, Margaret Girvan, Fearne Ewart and Judith Grinham (GBR)	4:34.6	
5	Odile Vouaux, Viviane Gouverneur, Ginette Jany-Sendral and Héda Frost (FRA)	4:36.6	

Heat Two

Place	Swimmers	Time	Notes
1	Margaret Gibson, Sandra Morgan, Elizabeth Fraser and Faith Leech (AUS)	4:25.0	
2	Judit Temes, Mária Littomeritzky, Katalin Szőke and Valéria Gyenge (HUN)	4:28.1	
3	Virginia Grant, Gladys Priestley, Sara Barber and Helen Stewart (CAN)	4:29.3	
4	Anita Hellström, Birgitta Wängberg, Karin Larsson and Kate Jobson (SWE)	4:30.1	
5	Hitomi Jinno, Eiko Wada, Yoshiko Sato and Yukiko Otaka (JPN)	4:35.8	NR

=== Final ===
Place	Nation	Swimmers	Time	Notes
1st place, gold medalist(s)	Australia	Dawn Fraser (1:04.0); Faith Leech (1:05.3); Sandra Morgan (1:04.7); Lorraine Crapp (1:03.1)	4:17.1	WR
2nd place, silver medalist(s)	United States	Sylvia Ruuska (1:06.3); Shelley Mann (1:03.9); Nancy Simons (1:04.6); Joan Rosazza (1:04.4)	4:19.2	
3rd place, bronze medalist(s)	South Africa	Natalie Myburgh (1:07.7); Susan Roberts (1:05.3); Moira Abernethy (1:08.0); Jeanette Myburgh (1:04.7)	4:25.7	
4	United Team of Germany	Ingrid Künzel (1:06.6); Hertha Haase (1:06.7); Kati Jansen (1:05.7); Birgit Klomp (1:07.1)	4:26.1	
5	Canada	Helen Stewart (1:07.1); Gladys Priestley (1:07.1); Sara Barber (1:07.5); Virginia Grant (1:06.6)	4:28.3	
6	Sweden	Anita Hellström (1:08.8); Birgitta Wängberg (1:07.7); Karin Larsson (1:07.4); Kate Jobson (1:06.1)	4:30.0	
7	Hungary	Mária Littomeritzky (1:09.9); Katalin Szőke (1:06.7); Judit Temes (1:06.7); Valéria Gyenge (1:07.8)	4:31.1	
8	Great Britain	Frances Hogben (1:08.8); Judy Grinham (1:09.0); Margaret Girvan (1:09.4); Fearne Ewart (1:08.6)	4:35.8	
