= Swimming at the 1956 Summer Olympics – Women's 400 metre freestyle =

Women's 400 metre freestyle at the Games of the XVI Olympiad
- Venue: Swimming and Diving Stadium
- Date: 5 December 1956 (heats); 7 December 1956 (final)
- Competitors: 26 from 13 nations
- Winning time: 4:54.6 OR

Medalists
1st place, gold medalist(s)		Lorraine Crapp	Australia
2nd place, silver medalist(s)		Dawn Fraser	Australia
3rd place, bronze medalist(s)		Sylvia Ruuska	United States

The women's 400 metre freestyle event at the 1956 Olympic Games took place between 5 and 7 December. This swimming event used freestyle swimming, which means that the method of the stroke is not regulated (unlike backstroke, breaststroke, and butterfly events). Nearly all swimmers use the front crawl or a variant of that stroke. Because an Olympic size swimming pool is 50 metres long, this race consisted of eight lengths of the pool.

== Results ==
=== Heats ===
Heat 1

Rank	Athlete	Country	Time	Notes
1	Valéria Gyenge	Hungary	5:14.2	
2	Héda Frost	France	5:14.4	
3	Karin Larsson	Sweden	5:18.3	
4	Beth Whittall	Canada	5:21.7	
5	Winifred Griffin	New Zealand	5:31.0	
6	Gertrudes Lozada	Philippines	5:34.2	

Heat 2

Rank	Athlete	Country	Time	Notes
1	Marley Shriver	United States	5:07.6	
2	Sandra Morgan	Australia	5:07.8	
3	Ingrid Künzel	Germany	5:20.8	
4	Gladys Priestley	Canada	5:27.5	
5	Anita Hellström	Sweden	5:29.2	
6	Viviane Gouverneur	France	5:29.7	

Heat 3

Rank	Athlete	Country	Time	Notes
1	Dawn Fraser	Australia	5:02.5	
2	Sylvia Ruuska	United States	5:10.3	
3	Ripszima Székely	Hungary	5:10.5	
4	Susan Roberts	South Africa	5:16.8	
5	Colette Thomas	France	5:23.9	
6	Birgitta Wängberg	Sweden	5:27.0	
7	Eiko Wada	Japan	5:27.2	

Heat 4

Rank	Athlete	Country	Time	Notes
1	Lorraine Crapp	Australia	5:00.2	
2	Susan Gray	United States	5:16.7	
3	Natalie Myburgh	South Africa	5:16.8	
4	Marrion Roe	New Zealand	5:18.5	
5	Margaret Girvan	Great Britain	5:23.6	
6	Gilda Aranda	Mexico	5:24.2	
7	Yukiko Otaka	Japan	5:28.7	

=== Final ===
Rank	Athlete	Country	Time	Notes
1	Lorraine Crapp	Australia	4:54.6	OR
2	Dawn Fraser	Australia	5:02.5	
3	Sylvia Ruuska	United States	5:07.1	
4	Marley Shriver	United States	5:12.9	
5	Ripszima Székely	Hungary	5:14.2	
6	Sandra Morgan	Australia	5:14.3	
7	Héda Frost	France	5:15.4	
8	Valéria Gyenge	Hungary	5:21.0	

Key: OR = Olympic record
