= Swimming at the 1956 Summer Olympics – Women's 100 metre freestyle =

Women's 100 metre freestyle at the Games of the XVI Olympiad
- Venue: Swimming and Diving Stadium
- Date: 29 November (heats); 30 November (semifinals); 1 December (final)
- Competitors: 35 from 16 nations
- Winning time: 1:02.0 WR

Medalists
1st place, gold medalist(s)		Dawn Fraser	Australia
2nd place, silver medalist(s)		Lorraine Crapp	Australia
3rd place, bronze medalist(s)		Faith Leech	Australia

The women's 100 metre freestyle event at the 1956 Olympic Games took place from 29 November to 1 December. This swimming event used freestyle swimming, which means that the method of the stroke is not regulated (unlike backstroke, breaststroke, and butterfly events). Nearly all swimmers use the front crawl or a variant of that stroke. Because an Olympic size swimming pool is 50 metres long, this race consisted of two lengths of the pool.

== Records ==
Prior to this competition, the existing world and Olympic records were:

World record	Lorraine Crapp (AUS)	1:02.4 s	Melbourne, Australia	25 October 1956
Olympic record	Judit Temes (HUN)	1:05.5 s	Helsinki, Finland	26 July 1952

The following records were established during the competition:

Date	Round	Name	Nationality	Time	OR	WR
29 November	Heat 1	Lorraine Crapp	Australia	1:03.4	OR	
29 November	Heat 5	Dawn Fraser	Australia	1:02.4	OR	
1 December	Final	Dawn Fraser	Australia	1:02.0	OR	WR

== Results ==
=== Heats ===
Rank	Heat	Name	Nationality	Time	Notes
1	5	Dawn Fraser	Australia	1:02.4	Q, OR
2	1	Lorraine Crapp	Australia	1:03.4	Q, OR
3	4	Faith Leech	Australia	1:04.9	Q
4	5	Natalie Myburgh	South Africa	1:05.1	Q
5	5	Virginia Grant	Canada	1:05.1	Q
6	5	Shelley Mann	United States	1:05.4	Q
7	1	Joan Rosazza	United States	1:05.5	Q
8	3	Marrion Roe	New Zealand	1:05.9	Q
9	4	Zsuzsa Ördög	Hungary	1:06.5	Q
9	2	Nancy Simons	United States	1:06.5	Q
11	3	Valéria Gyenge	Hungary	1:06.6	Q
12	1	Helen Stewart	Canada	1:07.1	Q
13	1	Jeanette Myburgh	South Africa	1:07.1	Q
14	4	Kate Jobson	Sweden	1:07.3	Q
15	3	Birgit Klomp	United Team of Germany	1:07.7	Q
16	4	Susan Roberts	South Africa	1:07.9	Q
17	2	Katalin Szőke	Hungary	1:08.0	
18	4	Christel Steffin	United Team of Germany	1:08.1	
19	2	Kati Jansen	United Team of Germany	1:08.3	
20	1	Anita Hellström	Sweden	1:08.5	
20	5	Frances Hogben	Great Britain	1:08.5	
22	2	Odile Vouaux	France	1:08.6	
23	2	Fearne Ewart	Great Britain	1:08.8	
23	3	Héda Frost	France	1:08.8	
23	4	Hitomi Jinno	Japan	1:08.8	
26	1	Irène Sweyd	Belgium	1:08.9	
27	4	Gladys Priestley	Canada	1:09.2	
28	3	Blanca Barrón	Mexico	1:09.5	
29	5	Ginette Jany-Sendral	France	1:09.9	
30	3	Yoshiko Sato	Japan	1:10.3	
30	5	Shoshana Rivner	Israel	1:10.3	
32	1	Winifred Griffin	New Zealand	1:10.4	
33	2	Setsuko Shimada	Japan	1:11.8	
34	1	Margaret Northrop	Kenya	1:12.8	
35	3	Gertrudez Lozada	Philippines	1:13.7	

=== Semifinals ===
Rank	Heat	Name	Nationality	Time	Notes
1	1	Dawn Fraser	Australia	1:03.0	Q
2	2	Lorraine Crapp	Australia	1:03.1	Q
3	1	Faith Leech	Australia	1:05.2	Q
4	2	Marrion Roe	New Zealand	1:05.3	Q
5	2	Virginia Grant	Canada	1:05.5	Q
6	2	Shelley Mann	United States	1:05.5	Q
7	1	Joan Rosazza	United States	1:05.9	Q
8	1	Natalie Myburgh	South Africa	1:06.0	Q
9	2	Nancy Simons	United States	1:06.1	
10	2	Kate Jobson	Sweden	1:06.1	
11	1	Valéria Gyenge	Hungary	1:06.4	
12	2	Susan Roberts	South Africa	1:06.6	
13	2	Jeanette Myburgh	South Africa	1:06.7	
14	1	Zsuzsa Ördögh	Hungary	1:06.9	
15	1	Helen Stewart	Canada	1:06.9	
16	1	Birgit Klomp	United Team of Germany	1:07.9	

=== Final ===
Rank	Name	Nationality	Time	Notes
1st place, gold medalist(s)	Dawn Fraser	Australia	1:02.0	WR
2nd place, silver medalist(s)	Lorraine Crapp	Australia	1:02.4	
3rd place, bronze medalist(s)	Faith Leech	Australia	1:05.1	
4	Joan Rosazza	United States	1:05.2	
5	Virginia Grant	Canada	1:05.4	
6	Shelley Mann	United States	1:05.6	
7	Marrion Roe	New Zealand	1:05.6	
8	Natalie Myburgh	South Africa	1:05.8	

Key: WR = World record
