= Sandra Morgan =

Australian swimmer (born 1942)

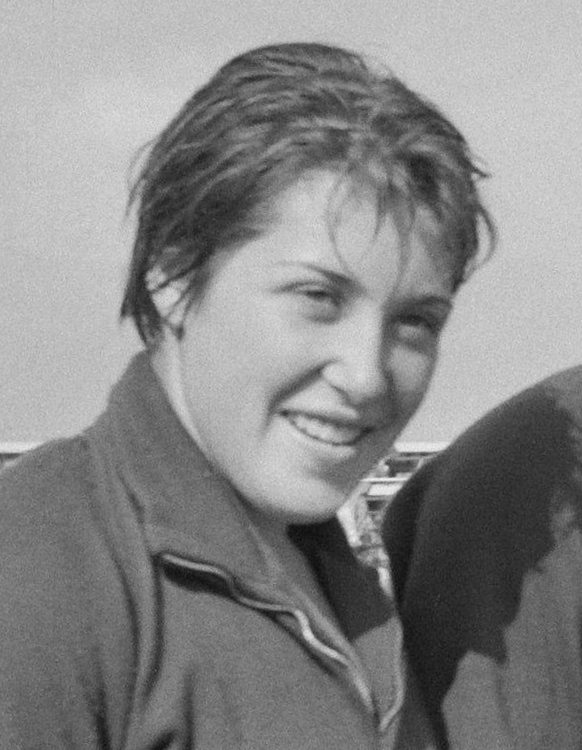
- Morgan in 1958

Personal information
- Full name: Sandra Anne Morgan
- National team: Australia
- Born: 6 June 1942 (age 84) Tamworth, New South Wales, Australia
- Height: 1.67 m (5 ft 6 in)
- Weight: 67 kg (148 lb)

Sport
- Sport: Swimming
- Strokes: Freestyle
- Club: Bankstown
Medal record
Representing Australia
Olympic Games
Gold medal – first place	1956 Melbourne	4×100 m freestyle
Commonwealth Games
Gold medal – first place	1958 Cardiff	4×110 yd freestyle

Sandra Anne Morgan (born 6 June 1942), also known by her married name Sandra Beavis, or as Sandra Morgan-Beavis, is an Australian former freestyle swimmer who was part of the gold medal-winning team in the 4×100-metre freestyle relay at the 1956 Summer Olympics in Melbourne. At the age of 14 years and 6 months, she became the youngest Australian to win an Olympic gold medal, a record that was broken by Arisa Trew at the 2024 Paris Olympics.

Morgan began serious training in early 1956 and won Olympic selection for the relay team as well as the 400-metre freestyle. Morgan's selection in the final quartet raised controversy because of her inexperience in top-level racing and her history of false starts. During the final, she lifted her head out of the water and saw her American opponent ahead of her, prompting her to regain the lead with a late burst in the third leg. Australia went on to win the relay in world record time. In her only individual event, Morgan came sixth in the 400-metre freestyle.

In 1957, she won the 110-, 220-, and 440-yard treble at the Australian Championships in the absence of her main rivals, but from that point on her career was plagued by illness and weight problems. She was selected in the 1958 British Empire and Commonwealth Games purely as a relay swimmer, winning gold in the event. At her second Olympic Games, the 1960 Summer Olympics in Rome, she only competed in the 4 × 100 relay heats; her teammates went on to win silver in the final. She retired from competitive swimming following the Rome Olympics.

In retirement, she has continued her involvement in swimming and the Olympics by teaching disabled children to swim and participating in Olympic educational programs and torch relays. She is also an ambassador for Australia Day and has appeared on television as part of her work with Christian groups.

== Early years ==
Morgan was born in the north-western New South Wales city of Tamworth, before growing up in Punchbowl, a suburb in South-western Sydney. Morgan was the oldest of four children, with two sisters and a brother. Her father Barrington, a plumber, had success as a swimmer in his childhood. As a result, he vowed that his daughter would become a national champion. Morgan said her father "became my driving and inspirational force. I not only fulfilled his ambition, but surpassed it by becoming an Olympic champion!" Morgan also cited her meetings with Frederick Lane—Australia's first Olympic gold medallist in swimming—and the Olympic athletics champion Marjorie Jackson-Nelson as key inspirational moments in her career.

Morgan learned to swim at Bankstown at the age of 7. She was initially slow to learn, and her coach used a long pole attached to a rope and belt to maintain her safety. This allowed him to fish her out of the water if she fell into difficulty. Due to her slow learning, Morgan was given twice the number of lessons as the other students. At the age of eight, she won the district championship, and in 1953, aged 11, she won the New South Wales (NSW) Primary School Championships. In February 1956, aged 13, she was taken for serious training. Her father transferred her to the tutelage of Frank Guthrie in Enfield. At the time, Guthrie was regarded as one of the best coaches in the state; his students included Gary Chapman, Kevin O'Halloran and Lorraine Crapp. All three (plus Morgan) would win medals at the 1956 Summer Olympics. Her mother had to drive her to Enfield, as her father was busy with the plumbing business.

== National selection ==
Under Guthrie's coaching, Morgan quickly became one of the fastest junior swimmers in the state, winning the under-14 110-yard and 55-yard freestyle, as well as the 110-yard butterfly at the New South Wales Championships in 1956. She went on to win the junior 110-yard freestyle at the Australian Championships, despite causing two false starts. After the national titles, she represented Marrickville Junior Girls' High School and won the State Combined High School Championship in the 110-yard freestyle.

Although her times were among the fastest in the country, Morgan's youth prevented selection for the Olympic training squad. However, the Australian Swimming Union allowed her to join the squad for training in Townsville at her own expense. Her family was unable to meet these costs, but a fundraising campaign by the Bankstown community allowed her to make the trip. Morgan trained in the Tobruk Memorial Baths alongside swimmers such as Crapp, Alva Colquhoun, Faith Leech and Dawn Fraser, and her times steadily improved. The team were expected to swim three times a day, totalling more than 16 km (9.9 mi). However, Morgan was not regarded as a likely selection in the final team.

Following the training camp, a series of selection trials were held in Brisbane and Melbourne. In three 100-metre races, Morgan came third, fifth and fourth respectively, with a best time of 1 minute 7.3 seconds. She recorded a best performance of third in a time of 5 minutes 10.0 seconds in the 400-metre freestyle behind Crapp and Fraser. Australia was entitled to three representatives in each individual event, thus allowing Morgan to compete in her first Olympics. Morgan missed out in the 100-metre freestyle as Fraser, Crapp and Leech were selected, but she gained an individual berth in the 400-metre along with Fraser and Crapp. She was one of six swimmers selected for the 4×100-metre freestyle relay squad, the first from Australia to compete at Olympic level. Morgan was placed under substantial pressure by media commentary that regarded her as the weak link in the relay team.

== 1956 Summer Olympics ==
Arriving in Melbourne for the Olympics, Morgan was not assured of a place in the final relay quartet. Fraser and Crapp were rested in the heats on 4 December while the remaining four swimmers qualified the team. Morgan swam the second leg in 1 minute 5.4 seconds, the fastest of the Australians, securing her position in the final four along with Leech. Australia qualified quickest for the final, winning the second heat by 3.1 seconds. They were 1.8 and 2.3 seconds faster than the South Africans and Americans, respectively, both of which swam in the first heat.

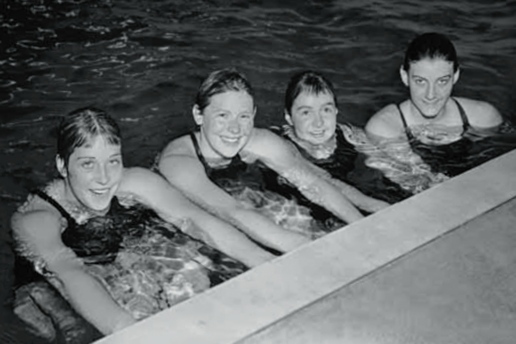
1956 Australian 4×100-metre freestyle relay team heat team (from left to right): Sandra Morgan, Margaret Gibson, Elizabeth Fraser, Faith Leech. The team for the final was Dawn Fraser, Leech, Morgan and Lorraine Crapp.

The selection of Leech and Morgan for the 6 December final generated controversy, as they were the two youngest swimmers in the squad and lacked experience at open level competition. Both had competed only once at senior Australian level; Morgan had twice false started at the 1956 Australian Championships, while Leech had been too ill to compete. Australia was the favourite for the relay, having swept the medals in the individual 100-metre event; Fraser, Crapp and Leech finished first, second and third. The favouritism was even more marked because Fraser and Crapp were three seconds faster than everyone else in the world.

The Australian team made a poor start in the final after Fraser almost stopped during the first leg, believing that a false start had occurred after mistakenly hearing a second gunshot. She finished her leg in 1 minute 4.0 seconds, almost two seconds slower than her personal best, but enough for a 2.3-second lead over the United States' Sylvia Ruuska. Swimming the second leg, Leech maintained the lead in the first 50 metres but faded in the second half and finished with a split of 1 minute 5.1 seconds; the Australian lead was thus cut to 0.9 s. Morgan dived in for the third leg and was then overhauled and passed by American Nancy Simons. With 25 metres left, Morgan took her head out of the water—a fundamental error—and seeing the American a body length in front, responded with a surge to regain a 0.7-second lead heading into the final changeover. Crapp then extended the margin to 2.2 seconds to secure an Australian victory in a world-record time of 4 minutes 17.1 seconds. The victory was the first time that Australia had swept the 100-metre freestyle relay and individual events for both men and women. The only other time that this has been achieved was by the Americans in 1920 in Antwerp. The win would be Australia's only triumph in a female swimming relay at the Olympics until the 2004 Games in Athens. The victory made Morgan Australia's youngest-ever gold medallist; this record stood until Arisa Trew won a gold medal for Women's Park Skateboarding at Paris 2024 on 6 August 2024.

Morgan's individual event was the 400-metre freestyle. She reduced her personal best by 2.3 seconds in recording a time of 5 minutes 7.8 seconds in the heats, just 0.2 of a second behind Marley Shriver of the United States, who set a new Olympic record. The mark was surpassed in later heats by Fraser and Crapp, but Morgan nevertheless qualified fourth fastest for the final, almost seven seconds faster than the cutoff. The final was held the day after the relay final. Morgan was unable to repeat her heat performance, finishing sixth in a time of 5 minutes 14.3 seconds, far outside her personal best. Had she repeated her heat swim, she would have placed fourth, just 0.7 of a second from the bronze medal. Nevertheless, she noted that "I was so happy that I had made the final in an individual event in the Olympic Games, for this was my first appearance in a senior competition".

Upon her return to Bankstown, Morgan was honoured with a civic reception and presented with a gold watch and life membership of the Bankstown Pool. However, her stay at the Olympic Village had given rise to a new problem. She enjoyed the food so much that she had gained 9.5 kilograms (21 lb) in weight, and now stood at 170 centimetres (5 ft 7 in) and weighed 76.2 kilograms (168 lb). This heralded the start of a continual weight problem.

== Later career ==
After the Olympics, Crapp and Fraser took a break from competitive swimming, while Leech retired. This allowed Morgan an opening, and she won both the junior and open sprint titles at the 1957 New South Wales Championships. She followed this by winning three individual titles at the Australian Championships in Canberra: the 110-, 220- and 440-yard freestyle, in times of 1 minute 7.8 seconds; 2 minutes 29.3 seconds; and 5 minutes 21.6 seconds, respectively. Her times were slower than her bests in 1956. She was part of the New South Wales team that won the 4×100-yard freestyle and medley relays, anchoring both quartets.

In 1958, Crapp and Fraser returned to the pool, while Ilsa Konrads emerged as a leading swimmer. At the Australian Championships, Morgan came third in both the 110-yard and 440-yard freestyle events; Fraser won both and Crapp and Konrads placed second in the 110-yard and 440-yard freestyle respectively. Morgan was selected for the 1958 British Empire and Commonwealth Games in Cardiff, Wales, but only in the 4×110-yard freestyle relay. Along with Fraser, Crapp and Konrads, she broke the world record for the event in March in Sydney with a time of 4 minutes 18.9 seconds. At the Empire Games, Fraser, Crapp, Morgan and Colquhoun lowered the world record to a time of 4 minutes 17.4 seconds to win gold.

After the Empire Games, the Australian team returned home via France, Austria, Germany, Netherlands, Italy and Singapore for a series of competitions. Morgan's best performances were at the Dutch and French Championships, where she came third in the 400-metre events. In 1959, she placed third in both the 440-yard and 880-yard freestyle events at the Australian Championships. Her swimming career was then interrupted by bronchitis, which developed into bronchial pneumonia. The illness forced her to take an extended break. Her chest problems persisted when she returned to competition at the 1960 Australian Championships, placing third in the 220-yard and 440-yard freestyle and fifth in the 110-yard freestyle. She gained selection for the 1960 Summer Olympics in Rome as a member of the 4×100-metre freestyle relay squad. She swam the first leg in the heats, posting a time of 1 minute 5.5 seconds, giving Australia a 1.0-second lead. Australia led at every change and went on to win its heat by five seconds, qualifying fastest for the final. However, Morgan posted the slowest leg of the Australian quartet and was dropped when Fraser and Konrads were brought into the team for the final, in which Australia won silver. Under the rules of the time, heat swimmers were not awarded medals if the final quartet placed in the top three positions. Suffering from periodic chest pain, Morgan retired from competitive swimming in December 1960.

== After swimming ==
Morgan married George Beavis in 1965 and had three daughters, all of whom enjoyed swimming victories at school and district level. After her marriage, she lived in the New South Wales towns of Griffith and Orange for six years before returning to Sydney. She experimented with coaching, but found the competition unappealing and became a schoolteacher. In 1978, she began teaching handicapped children to swim in her backyard pool, and was given a government grant to continue her work. She then ran a swimming school at Bonnet Bay for 15 years and worked at the Bates Drive Special School, receiving a grant to teach preschool handicapped children swimming. In later life, Morgan successfully fought a life-threatening battle against lupus, and in 2004 she was living in Sutherland Shire in southern Sydney.

A committed Christian, Morgan has been a public speaker at functions for Seasons Christian Women's Conference. From January 1996 to mid-1999, she lived in Kuala Lumpur, Malaysia, along with her husband, who was posted there by his employer. During that time, Morgan worked as a Bible teacher at St Andrew's Presbyterian Church, Kuala Lumpur. She has also appeared on Face to Face, a Christian television talk show that screens on the Ten Network.

In 1995, Morgan was inducted into the Hall of Champions at the State Sports Centre and the Path of Champions at the Sydney Olympic Park Aquatic Centre. She has been involved in educational programs aimed at promoting the Olympic movement in schools and helps to raise funds for the Australian Olympic Committee. In 2000, Morgan was awarded the Australian Government's Australian Sports Medal for her contributions to the 2000 Summer Olympics held in Sydney and her achievements as a competitor. She has been awarded the honour of carrying the Olympic torch during its passage through Australia in both 2000 and 2004. Morgan is an Australia Day ambassador, and travels to regional towns promoting the annual celebrations.

== See also ==
- List of Olympic medalists in swimming (women)
- World record progression 4 × 100 metres freestyle relay

== Cited sources ==
- Andrews, Malcolm (2000). Australia at the Olympic Games. Sydney, New South Wales: ABC Books. ISBN 0-7333-0884-8.
- Howell, Max (1986). Aussie Gold. Albion, Queensland: Brooks Waterloo. ISBN 0-86440-680-0.
