= Swimming at the 1956 Summer Olympics =

Swimming at the Games of the XVI Olympiad
- Venue: Melbourne Sports and Entertainment Centre
- Dates: 29 November – 7 December 1956
- No. of events: 13
- Competitors: 235 from 33 nations

At the 1956 Summer Olympics in Melbourne, 13 swimming events were contested, seven for men and six for women. There was a total of 235 participants from 33 countries competing. For the first time, the butterfly stroke was contested as a separate event. Australia dominated the medal standings with a total of 8 out of a possible 13 gold medals, eventually finishing with 14 medals overall.

== Medal table ==
| Rank | Nation | Gold | Silver | Bronze | Total |
|---|---|---|---|---|---|
| 1 | Australia | 8 | 4 | 2 | 14 |
| 2 | United States | 2 | 4 | 5 | 11 |
| 3 | Japan | 1 | 4 | 0 | 5 |
| 4 | Great Britain | 1 | 0 | 1 | 2 |
| 4 | United Team of Germany | 1 | 0 | 1 | 2 |
| 6 | Hungary | 0 | 1 | 1 | 2 |
| 7 | Soviet Union | 0 | 0 | 2 | 2 |
| 8 | South Africa | 0 | 0 | 1 | 1 |
| Totals (8 entries) | | 13 | 13 | 13 | 39 |

== Medalists ==
=== Men's events ===
| Games | Gold | | Silver | | Bronze | |
|---|---|---|---|---|---|---|
| 100 m freestyle | Jon Henricks; Australia | 55.4 (WR) | John Devitt; Australia | 55.8 | Gary Chapman; Australia | 56.7 |
| 400 m freestyle | Murray Rose; Australia | 4:27.3 (WR) | Tsuyoshi Yamanaka; Japan | 4:30.4 | George Breen; United States | 4:32.5 |
| 1500 m freestyle | Murray Rose; Australia | 17:58.9 | Tsuyoshi Yamanaka; Japan | 18:00.3 | George Breen; United States | 18:08.2 |
| 100 m backstroke | David Theile; Australia | 1:02.2 (WR) | John Monckton; Australia | 1:03.2 | Frank McKinney; United States | 1:04.5 |
| 200 m breaststroke | Masaru Furukawa; Japan | 2:34.7 | Masahiro Yoshimura; Japan | 2:36.7 | Kharis Yunichev; Soviet Union | 2:36.8 |
| 200 m butterfly | William Yorzyk; United States | 2:19.3 | Takashi Ishimoto; Japan | 2:23.8 | György Tumpek; Hungary | 2:23.9 |
| 4 × 200 metre freestyle relay | Australia; Kevin O'Halloran; John Devitt; Murray Rose; Jon Henricks | 8:23.6 (WR) | United States; Dick Hanley; George Breen; Bill Woolsey; Ford Konno | 8:31.5 | Soviet Union; Vitaly Sorokin; Vladimir Struzhanov; Gennady Nikolayev; Boris Nikitin | 8:34.7 |

=== Women's events ===
| Games | Gold | | Silver | | Bronze | |
|---|---|---|---|---|---|---|
| 100 m freestyle | Dawn Fraser; Australia | 1:02.0 (WR) | Lorraine Crapp; Australia | 1:02.3 | Faith Leech; Australia | 1:05.1 |
| 400 m freestyle | Lorraine Crapp; Australia | 4:54.6 (OR) | Dawn Fraser; Australia | 5:02.5 | Sylvia Ruuska; United States | 5:07.1 |
| 100 m backstroke | Judy Grinham; Great Britain | 1:12.9 (WR) | Carin Cone; United States | 1:12.9 (WR) | Margaret Edwards; Great Britain | 1:13.1 |
| 200 m breaststroke | Ursula Happe; United Team of Germany | 2:53.1 (OR) | Éva Székely; Hungary | 2:54.8 | Eva-Maria Elsen; United Team of Germany | 2:55.1 |
| 100 m butterfly | Shelley Mann; United States | 1:11.0 (OR) | Nancy Ramey; United States | 1:11.9 | Mary Sears; United States | 1:14.4 |
| 4 × 100 metre freestyle relay | Australia; Dawn Fraser; Faith Leech; Sandra Morgan; Lorraine Crapp | 4:17.1 (WR) | United States; Sylvia Ruuska; Shelley Mann; Nancy Simons; Joan Rosazza | 4:19.2 | South Africa; Natalie Myburgh; Susan Roberts; Moira Abernethy; Jeanette Myburgh | 4:25.7 |

== Participating nations ==
235 swimmers from 33 nations competed.

- Australia (26)
- Belgium (6)
- Brazil (4)
- Canada (8)
- Colombia (3)
- Cuba (2)
- Czechoslovakia (2)
- Denmark (2)
- Finland (1)
- France (16)
- United Team of Germany (18)
- Great Britain (18)
- Hong Kong (2)
- Hungary (16)
- India (2)
- Indonesia (3)
- Israel (1)
- Italy (7)
- Japan (19)
- Kenya (1)
- Luxembourg (1)
- Malaya (2)
- Mexico (4)
- New Zealand (5)
- Pakistan (3)
- Philippines (8)
- Poland (1)
- Romania (2)
- South Africa (8)
- Sweden (5)
- Soviet Union (10)
- United States (28)
- Yugoslavia (1)
