= South Africa at the 1956 Summer Olympics =

- IOC code: RSA (ZAF used at these Games)
- NOC: South African Sports Confederation and Olympic Committee

in Melbourne/Stockholm
- Competitors: 50 (44 men and 6 women) in 10 sports
- Medals Ranked 33rd: Gold 0 Silver 0 Bronze 4 Total 4

Summer Olympics appearances (overview)
- 1904; 1908; 1912; 1920; 1924; 1928; 1932; 1936; 1948; 1952; 1956; 1960; 1964–1988; 1992; 1996; 2000; 2004; 2008; 2012; 2016; 2020; 2024

The Union of South Africa competed at the 1956 Summer Olympics in Melbourne, Australia. 50 competitors, 44 men and 6 women, took part in 50 events in 10 sports.

== Medalists ==
=== Bronze ===
- Daniel Bekker — Boxing, Men's Heavyweight
- Henry Loubscher — Boxing, Men's Light Welterweight
- Alfred Swift — Cycling, Men's 1.000m Time Trial
- Moira Abernethy, Jeanette Myburgh, Natalie Myburgh and Susan Roberts — Swimming, Women's 4 × 100 m Freestyle Relay

== Athletics ==
Men's 110m Hurdles

- Danie Burger

- Heat — 14.4s
- Semifinals — 15.0s (→ did not advance)

Men's Marathon

- Mercer Davis — 2:39:48 (→ 14th place)
- Jan Barnard — did not finish (→ no ranking)

Men's Discus Throw

- Fanie du Plessis

- Qualifying Heat — 50.69
- Final — 48.49 (→ 13th place)

== Cycling ==
Sprint

- Thomas Shardelow — 8th place

Time trial

- Alfred Swift — 1:11.6 (→ Bronze Medal)

Tandem

- Raymond Robinson
  Thomas Shardelow — 7th place

Team pursuit

- Alfred Swift
  Anne Jan Hettema
  Charles Jonker
  Robert Fowler — 4:39.4 (→ 4th place)

Individual road race

- Alfred Swift — did not finish (→ no ranking)
- Robert Fowler — did not finish (→ no ranking)
- Anne Jan Hettema — did not finish (→ no ranking)
- Charles Jonker — did not finish (→ no ranking)

== Modern pentathlon ==
Three male pentathletes represented South Africa in 1956.

Individual

- Okkie van Greunen
- Harry Schmidt
- Marthinus du Plessis

Team

- Okkie van Greunen
- Harry Schmidt
- Marthinus du Plessis

== Shooting ==
Two shooters represented South Africa in 1956.

50 m rifle, three positions

- Robin Lavine

50 m rifle, prone

- Johannes Human
- Robin Lavine

== Swimming ==
Men

Athlete	Event	Heat		Semifinal		Final	
Athlete	Event	Time	Rank	Time	Rank	Time	Rank
Peter Duncan	100 m freestyle	1:00.4	31	Did not advance			
Dennis Ford	100 m freestyle	59.5	20	Did not advance			
Billy Steuart	100 m freestyle	59.2	18	Did not advance			
Tony Briscoe	400 m freestyle	4:41.4	13	—		Did not advance	
Peter Duncan	400 m freestyle	4:46.7	21	—		Did not advance	
Billy Steuart	400 m freestyle	4:43.0	17	—		Did not advance	
Peter Duncan	1500 m freestyle	19:58.5	19	—		Did not advance	
Billy Steuart; Tony Briscoe; Dennis Ford; Peter Duncan	4 × 200 m freestyle	8:43.0	7 Q	—		8:49.5	8

Women

Athlete	Event	Heat		Semifinal		Final	
Athlete	Event	Time	Rank	Time	Rank	Time	Rank
Jeanette Myburgh	100 m freestyle	1:07.1	13 Q	1:06.7	13	Did not advance	
Natalie Myburgh	100 m freestyle	1:05.1	4 Q	1:06.0	8 Q	1:05.8	8
Susan Roberts	100 m freestyle	1:07.9	16 Q	1:06.6	12	Did not advance	
Natalie Myburgh	400 m freestyle	5:16.8	=10	—		Did not advance	
Susan Roberts	400 m freestyle	5:16.8	=10	—		Did not advance	
Moira Abernethy	100 m backstroke	1:15.4	=10	—		Did not advance	
Natalie Myburgh; Susan Roberts; Moira Abernethy; Jeanette Myburgh	4 × 100 m freestyle	4:26.8	2 Q	—		4:25.7	3rd place, bronze medalist(s)
