= Faith Leech =

Australian swimmer

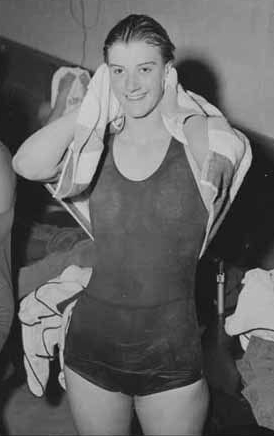
- Leech at 1956 Olympics

Personal information
- Full name: Faith Yvonne Leech
- Nickname: "Flying Fish"
- National team: Australia
- Born: 31 March 1941 Bendigo, Victoria, Australia
- Died: 14 September 2013 (aged 72) Bendigo, Victoria, Australia
- Height: 1.78 m (5 ft 10 in)
- Weight: 57 kg (126 lb)

Sport
- Sport: Swimming
- Strokes: Freestyle
Medal record
Women's swimming
Representing Australia
Olympic Games
| Gold medal – first place | 1956 Melbourne | 4×100 m freestyle |
| Bronze medal – third place | 1956 Melbourne | 100 m freestyle |

Faith Yvonne Leech (31 March 1941 – 14 September 2013) was an Australian freestyle swimmer who won a gold medal in the 4×100–metre freestyle relay and bronze in the 100-metre freestyle at the 1956 Summer Olympics in Melbourne.

A tall and lean swimmer known for her elegant technique, Leech started swimming as a child to build strength after a series of stomach disorders in her infancy. She quickly rose to prominence after breaking a string of age group records. In 1955, she became the youngest swimmer to win an Australian title, claiming victory in the 110-yard freestyle at the age of 13. She twice broke the Australian record in the 100-yard freestyle in late 1955, thereby positioning herself as a leading contender for Olympic selection in 1956. Leech's preparation was hindered by illness, which forced her out of the 1956 Australian Championships, but she recovered to gain Olympic selection in both the 100-metre freestyle and the corresponding relay. Leech produced a late surge to take bronze in the individual event and seal an Australian trifecta, before swimming the second leg in the relay to help secure an Australian victory in world record time. Leech retired after the Olympics at the age of 15; she cited anxiety caused by racing as one of the main factors in her decision.

== Early years ==
The second child of Johnstone Melmore and Jessie Francis Leech, Leech was born in Bendigo, Victoria. She was given the name Faith after her elder sister, who died from leukaemia at the age of two. A delicate child, Leech had an aversion to eating in the first two years of her life, so her mother fed her in small hourly doses. Leech was twice rushed from the family home to a Melbourne hospital. Conventional medicine failed to rectify Leech's dietary issues, so her mother put her on a fast for ten days at the recommendation of a naturopath. Leech was later placed on a diet of fruit, salad and vegetables, with an emphasis on beetroot juice and carrot juice.

Leech's health improved, but she remained slight and frail, with a double curvature of the back. In an effort to help her gain muscle control and confidence, her parents sent her to start ballet dancing, before trying swimming, a sport her mother had competed in. Aged six, she was taken to swimming classes while the family holidayed in the Mornington Peninsula. Leech was coached by Gustav Fröhlich, (also known as Gus Froelich) a former European swimming champion and coach of Australian Olympic medallist Judy-Joy Davies.

After a difficult start, Leech improved in her second year. At the Victorian Championships, she showed her potential by setting a state record of 17.4 seconds (s) for the 25-yard freestyle in the under-8 division. The following year, she covered 25 yards in 15.7 seconds, three seconds faster than Davies had done at the same age. She progressed steadily, sweeping the state age titles from nine to 13, setting records that were often faster than those by boys of the same age.

Living in Bendigo and studying at Camp Hill Primary School, Leech could only travel three times a year to train with Froelich, so she relied heavily on dry land simulations, such as a pulley attached to the kitchen door. When she was 12, she covered 110 yards in 1 minute (min) 7.1 seconds, setting an unofficial world record for her age group. This achievement prompted her parents to rent an apartment in Melbourne, so she could train with Froelich on a regular basis. Leech moved there with her mother, while her father stayed in Bendigo to look after the family's jewellery business.

From 1954, Leech attended St. Michael's Girls' Grammar School and trained with Froelich on a daily basis at the City Baths. The regular sessions paid off at the 1955 Victorian Championships; Leech won the open 110- and 220-yard freestyle in times of 1 minute 7.2 seconds and 2 minutes 39.3 seconds, respectively, setting state records in both events. She proceeded to the Australian Championships, winning the 110-yard freestyle in 1 minute 7.6 seconds to become the youngest ever winner of an open title at the age of 13. Leech also won the national junior 110- and 220-yard events.

Leech's regimen differed from most swimmers because Froelich was not an advocate of distance training, and designed shorter workouts for his students. She trained once a day, swimming no more than 3 km (1.9 mi). Froelich did not push her to continue swimming laps when she felt tired, but emphasised an efficient stroke mechanism, which Leech implemented with a long and graceful arm action. Leech stood 180 centimetres (5 ft 11 in), but weighed only 57 kg (126 lb), with broad shoulders, slim hips and large hands and feet. Her long streamlined action prompted observers to call her a "flying fish". Spinal problems caused by a back misalignment prevented her from using the optimal flip turn preferred by freestyle swimmers. Instead, she was forced to utilise the touch turn, which was slower.

== National selection ==
In August 1955, Leech set an Australian record of 1 minute 5.0 seconds for the 110-yard freestyle, before lowering it to 1 minute 4.8 seconds in October; this prompted newspapers to trumpet her as a prospect for the Melbourne Olympics. She did not get an opportunity to defend her Australian title in 1956 because she was hospitalised with illness. Leech recovered in time to win the national age title in the 100-metre freestyle in a time of 1 minute 4.6 seconds, just 0.1 of a second outside Dawn Fraser's world record. She then posted a time of 1 minute 4.6 seconds to defeat Fraser and Lorraine Crapp at another meeting in the following month.

Leech was named in the Olympic squad and the Australian Swimming Union exempted her from travelling to the national training camp in Townsville so she could train with Froelich, who understood her special dietary requirements. She joined the squad for the final race trials in Melbourne in October before the Olympics. Fraser and Crapp were too strong in the 100-metre freestyle, with Leech finishing second and third in the two races. After combining with Fraser, Crapp and Margaret Gibson to break the world record for the 4×100-metre freestyle relay, Leech was selected as one of Australia's three entrants in the 100-metre freestyle events and one of six swimmers for the 4×100-metre freestyle relay squad for the Olympics.

== International career ==
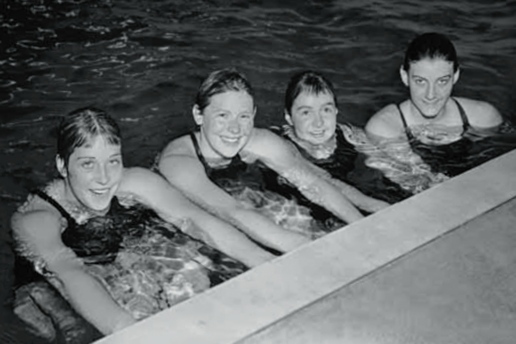
The Australian 4×100-metre relay team (second heat) at the 1956 Summer Olympics (left to right: Sandra Morgan, Margaret Gibson, Elizabeth Fraser, Leech).

Having arrived at the Olympics, Leech made her debut in the 100-metre freestyle, an event in which she, Fraser and Crapp were regarded as the three strongest competitors, although the latter two were considered to be substantially stronger. All three won their heats. Leech won her heat by 1.6 seconds in a time of 1 minute 4.9 seconds. She was third fastest qualifier behind Fraser and Crapp, who were over 1.5 seconds faster. Drawn in Fraser's semifinal, Leech finished second in a time of 1 minute 5.2 seconds, and was the third fastest qualifier for the final behind her compatriots. The semifinals followed a similar pattern to the heats, with Fraser and Crapp more than two seconds ahead of the six remaining qualifiers, who were separated by just 0.8 of a second.

This pattern was repeated in the final. Fraser and Crapp were far ahead of the field, finishing in 1 minute 2.0 seconds and 1 minute 2.3 seconds, respectively. Leech overtook the United States' Joan Rosazza in the final 25 metres to take bronze in 1 minute 5.1 seconds. The race for third place had been tight, with just 0.7 of a second separating Leech and the final finisher. The youngest swimmer in the field, Leech had come through to claim the last podium position. Leech said that it was an emotional occasion, having seen the Australian men take a trifecta in the corresponding event on the previous night of racing.

As the Australians boasted the three fastest swimmers in the individual 100-metre freestyle event, they were clear favourites for the corresponding relay, especially as Fraser and Crapp were three seconds faster than all of the other swimmers. Leech was not assured of a place in the final quartet. In the heats, Fraser and Crapp were rested and the remaining four swimmers, Sandra Morgan, Elizabeth Fraser, Gibson and Leech qualified the team. Leech swam the second leg in 1 minute 5.9 seconds, the second fastest of the Australians, thereby securing her position in the final along with Sandra Morgan, who recorded a time of 1 minute 5.4 seconds. Australia won the second heat by 3.1 seconds to qualify quickest for the final. They were 1.8 and 2.3 seconds faster than South Africa and the United States, respectively, both of whom swam in the first heat. The selection of Leech and Morgan generated controversy. They were Australia's youngest swimmers and lacked experience at open level competition: Morgan had false started twice at the Australian Championships, and both had competed at national level only once.

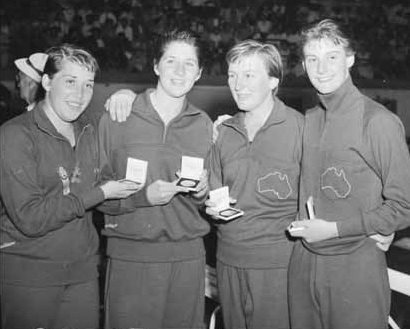
The winning quartet: Sandra Morgan, Dawn Fraser, Lorraine Crapp and Faith Leech.

In the final, Australia made a poor start; Dawn Fraser almost stopped when she heard a second gunshot, believing that a false start had occurred. She finished her leg in 1 minute 4.0 seconds, two seconds slower than the world record she set in the individual 100-metre final, but with a 2.3-second lead over the United States' Sylvia Ruuska. Nevertheless, this meant that Australia had a smaller than expected advantage. Swimming the second leg, Leech maintained the lead in the first 50 metres but faded in the second half and finished with a split of 1 minute 5.1 seconds, with the Australian lead cut to 0.9 of a second. Even with the advantage of a flying start, Leech's leg was 0.4 of a second slower than her fastest time during the individual competition.

Morgan was then overhauled and passed by Nancy Simons. With 25 metres left, Morgan took her head out of the water, and seeing the American a body length in front, dug deep to re-establish a lead of 0.7 of a second going into the final changeover. Crapp then extended the lead over the United States to 2.2 seconds to secure gold in a world record time of 4 minutes 17.1 seconds. The Melbourne Olympics was the only time that Australia has made a clean sweep of the 100-metre freestyle and the relay events for both men and women. This feat has only been equalled by the Americans at the 1920 Summer Olympics. The victory was Australia's only victory in a female swimming relay at the Olympics until the 2004 Summer Olympics.

== Retirement ==
After the 1956 Olympics, Leech retired from competitive swimming at the age of 15. She was the first person from Bendigo to win an Olympic medal and was feted upon returning to her hometown. She regarded the experience of living in the Olympic Village as an unusual one; in addition to the large crowds and the pressure of an Olympics, it was the first time that she had been away from the family home. Physicians endorsed her decision to retire, feeling that she became too nervous prior to races. Leech briefly worked in Melbourne as a model, before returning to Bendigo to help run the family jewellery business. She took a leading role in the business after the death of her father in the 1970s, before handing control of the firm to her son.

Leech married Mitch Tuohy and had two sons, Adam and Troy, whom she discouraged from entering competitive swimming, fearing the pressure and strain of racing. In retirement, she shunned competitive sport, but maintained her fitness and athleticism. She taught swimming to disabled children, some of whom represented Australia at the Special Olympics.

Leech continued her involvement with the Olympic movement through volunteer work. In July 1999, Leech and Australia's then-oldest man and World War I veteran Jack Lockett were the guests of honour at a countdown celebration to the arrival of the Olympic Torch in Bendigo in July 2000. In 2001, she was diagnosed with a tumour in her neck, which was the size of a 50c coin. The tumour was removed in a seven-hour operation followed by six weeks of radiotherapy treatment. This experience prompted her to become a volunteer for the Cancer Council and help those who were diagnosed with the disease. In February 2003, Leech phoned quadruple Olympic champion Betty Cuthbert to comfort her during her recovery from a brain hemorrhage. In October 2006, Leech combined with 1956 teammate John Devitt to launch "50 Years On—The Melbourne Olympics", a series of stamps from the Australia Post.

Leech is an inductee of the Path of Champions at Sydney Olympic Park Aquatic Centre. She died at her home on 14 September 2013, aged 72.

== See also ==
- List of Olympic medalists in swimming (women)
- World record progression 4 × 100 metres freestyle relay

== Bibliography ==
- Andrews, Malcolm (2000). Australia at the Olympic Games. Sydney, New South Wales: ABC Books. ISBN 0-7333-0884-8.
- Howell, Max (1986). Aussie Gold. Albion, Queensland: Brooks Waterloo. ISBN 0-86440-680-0.
