= Ördög (surname) =

Ördög is a Hungarian-language surname. Ördög is a Hungarian kind of devil. Notable people with this surname or nickname include:

- Zsuzsa Ördög, Hungarian swimmer
- Nóra Ördög, Hungarian TV show presenter
- Balázs Ördög (1575-1645), Hungarian rebel
