= Rainer Osselmann =

German water polo player (1960–2023)

Personal information
- Born: July 25, 1960 Duisburg, West Germany
- Died: April 23, 2023 (aged 62) Amtzell, Germany

Sport
- Sport: Water polo
Medal record
Representing West Germany
Olympic Games
Bronze medal – third place	1984 Los Angeles	Team competition
World Championships
Bronze medal – third place	1982 Guayaquil	Team competition
European Championships
Gold medal – first place	1981 Split	Team competition
Gold medal – first place	1989 Bonn	Team competition
Bronze medal – third place	1985 Sofia	Team competition

Rainer Osselmann (25 July 1960 – 23 April 2023) was a German water polo player who competed in the 1984 Summer Olympics and in the 1988 Summer Olympics.

Osselmann was born in Duisburg. His father, Friedhelm Osselmann, played water polo for West Germany at the 1956 and 1960 Olympics, whereas his mother, Birgit Klomp, competed in swimming at the 1956 Games.

Osselmann died in Amtzell on 23 April 2023, at the age of 62.

== See also ==
- List of Olympic medalists in water polo (men)
- List of World Aquatics Championships medalists in water polo
