= Gustav Fröhlich (swimmer) =

German-Australian swimmer (1902–1968)

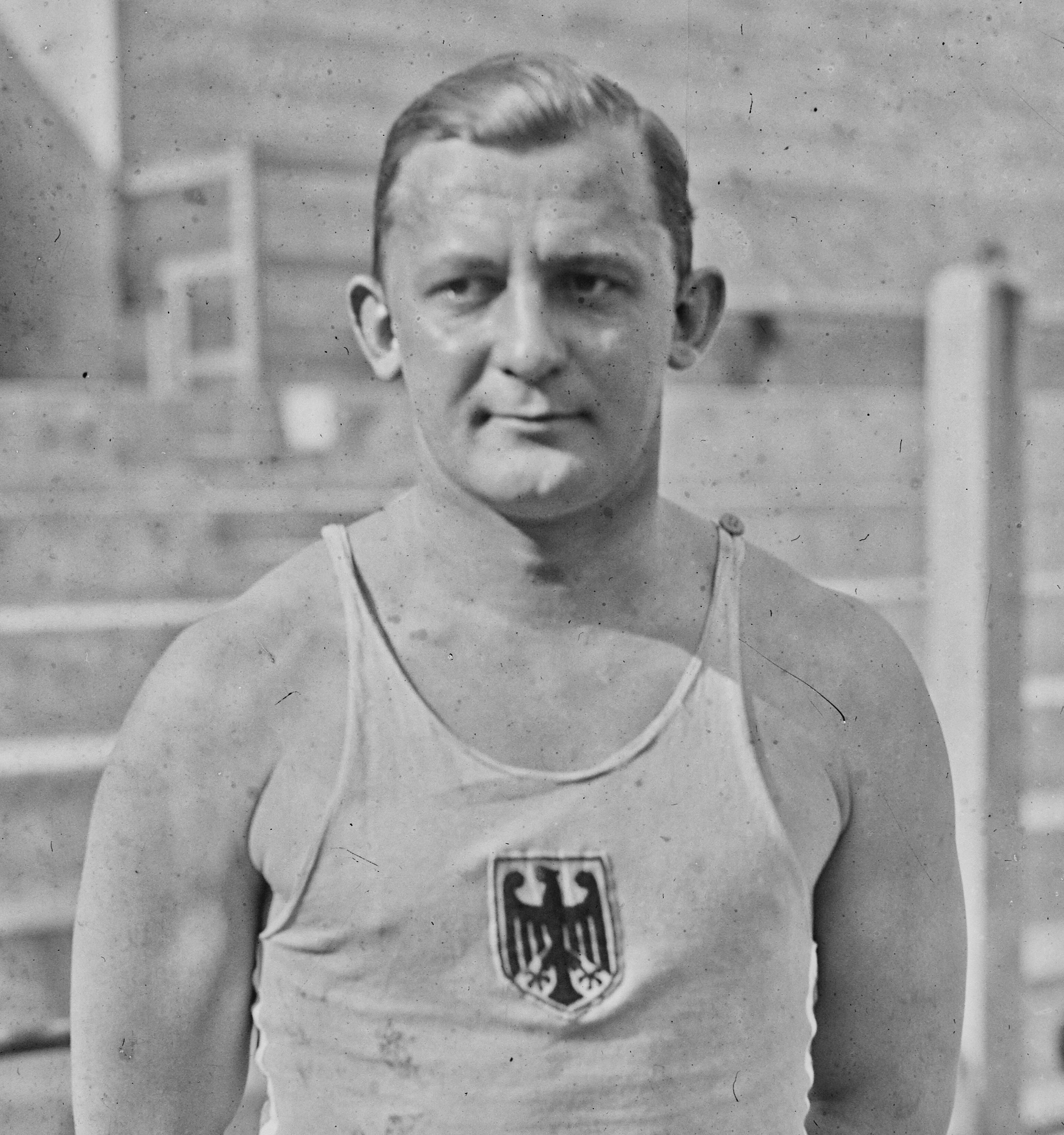
- Gustav Frölich in 1927

Personal information
- Born: 1902 Samoa
- Died: 17 April 1968 (aged approximately 66) Victoria, Australia

Sport
- Sport: Swimming
Medal record
Swimming
European Championships
Representing Germany
Gold medal – first place	1926 Budapest	100 m backstroke
Bronze medal – third place	1927 Bologna	100 m backstroke

Gustav Fröhlich (also Frölich; 1902 – 17 April 1968) was a German-Australian swimmer and swimming coach.

During the 1920s he swam for the SC Hellas swimming club in Magdeburg. On 2 October 1921 he set a world record of 1.14 minutes for the 100 metres backstroke. Between 1921 and 1926 he was five times 100 metres backstroke champion in the German Championships. He won two European medals, gold in Budapest in 1926 and bronze in the following year, 1927, both in backstroke, as well as five national titles between 1921 and 1926.

He migrated to Australia during the 1930s where he became a noted swimming coach. He coached Lorraine Crapp to two gold records at the Melbourne Olympics in 1956. He also coached Faith Leech who won medals at the Melbourne Olympics in 1956 and Judy-Joy Davies who won a medal at the London Olympics in 1948.

Gustav-Frölich-Allee in Magdeburg is named after him.
