= Ripszima Székely =

Hungarian swimmer

Personal information
- Nationality: Hungarian
- Born: 12 July 1936 (age 89) Budapest, Hungary

Sport
- Sport: Swimming

Ripszima Székely (born 12 July 1936) is a Hungarian former swimmer. She competed in the women's 100 metre freestyle and the women's 400 metre freestyle at the 1956 Summer Olympics.
