= Hertha Haase =

German swimmer

Personal information
- Born: 3 July 1941 (age 85)

Sport
- Sport: Swimming

Hertha Haase (born 3 July 1941) is a German former swimmer. She competed in the women's 4 × 100 metre freestyle relay at the 1956 Summer Olympics.
