= Margaret Northrop =

Kenyan swimmer (born 1934)

Personal information
- Born: 16 April 1934 (age 92)

Sport
- Sport: Swimming

Margaret Northrop (born 16 April 1934) is a Kenyan former swimmer. She competed in the women's 100 metre freestyle at the 1956 Summer Olympics. She was the first woman to represent Kenya at the Olympics.
