= Tony Briscoe =

South African swimmer (1939–2018)

Personal information
- Full name: Anthony Briscoe
- Born: 22 April 1939
- Died: 1 December 2018 (aged 79)

Sport
- Sport: Swimming

Tony Briscoe (22 April 1939 – 1 December 2018) was a South African swimmer. He competed in two events at the 1956 Summer Olympics.
