= Setsuko Shimada =

Japanese swimmer (born 1938)

Personal information
- Born: 14 August 1938 (age 88)

Sport
- Sport: Swimming
Medal record
Women's swimming
Representing Japan
Asian Games
Gold medal – first place	1958 Tokyo	4×100 m freestyle

Setsuko Shimada (島田 節子, Shimada Setsuko; born 14 August 1938) is a Japanese former swimmer. She competed in the women's 100 metre freestyle at the 1956 Summer Olympics.
