= Kay Knapp =

American swimmer

Personal information
- Full name: Kathryn Elizabeth Knapp -Norton
- Nickname: "Kay"
- National team: United States
- Born: September 14, 1938 (age 87) Washington, D.C., U.S.
- Height: 5 ft 7 in (1.70 m)
- Weight: 126 lb (57 kg)

Sport
- Sport: Swimming
- Strokes: Freestyle
- Club: Walter Reed Swim (Washington D.C.); Terrapin Swim Club (Bethesda)
- Coach: J. Campbell, Stan Tinkham (W. Reed); Stan Tinkham (Olympics)

Kathryn Elizabeth Knapp (born September 14, 1938), also known by her married name Kay Norton, is an American former competition swimmer who represented the United States at the 1956 Summer Olympics in Melbourne, Australia.

Knapp was born September 14, 1938 in Washington, D.C. In August, 1953, she represented the Kenwood Country Club at Country Club Swimming Championship, where she placed first and second in short events. She attended High School in Chevy Chase, Maryland. In her youth, she swam primarily for the strong program at the Walter Reed Swim Club under Jim Campbell and then Hall of Fame Coach Stan Tinkham, where she won American Athletic Union Titles in the 4x100-yard freestyle relay in both the 1954 AAU National Indoor, and 1954 National Outdoor Swimming Championships. As noted, swimming at age 15, representing the Walter Reed Club at the National AAU Indoor Swimming Championship on April 17, 1954, she swam the second leg of the 100-meter relay team that won the event in a world record time of 3:59.2 in Daytona Beach, Florida, bettering the former world record time of 4:03.5. By 1956, she swam for the Terapin Swim Club in Bethesda, Maryland.

She was sixth at the 1956 Olympic Trials in San Francisco both in the 100-meter freestyle with a time of 1:07.2, and also placed sixth the 100-meter butterfly. Her freestyle time qualified her for the 4x100 freestyle relay team, in which she swam in the preliminary heats in Melbourne.

== 1956 Melbourne Olympics ==
At the 1956 Olympics, Knapp swam for the silver medal-winning U.S. team in the qualifying heats of the women's 4×100-meter freestyle relay under U.S. Olympic Women's Head Coach Stanley Tinkham. Knapp did not receive a medal, however, because only relay swimmers who competed in the event final were medal-eligible under the Olympic rules then in effect.

Continuing to train and compete as she matured, Kay swam with the Potomac Valley Chapter of United States Masters Swimming, earning seven top ten age group times in 1974-5, where she competed in butterfly, backstroke, and Individual Medley events, at the ages of 35 and 36.
