= Irène Sweyd =

Belgian swimmer

Personal information
- Born: 7 July 1940 (age 86) Antwerp, Belgium

Sport
- Sport: Swimming

Irène Sweyd (born 7 July 1940) is a Belgian former swimmer. She competed in the women's 100 metre freestyle at the 1956 Summer Olympics.
