= Marrion Roe =

New Zealand swimmer

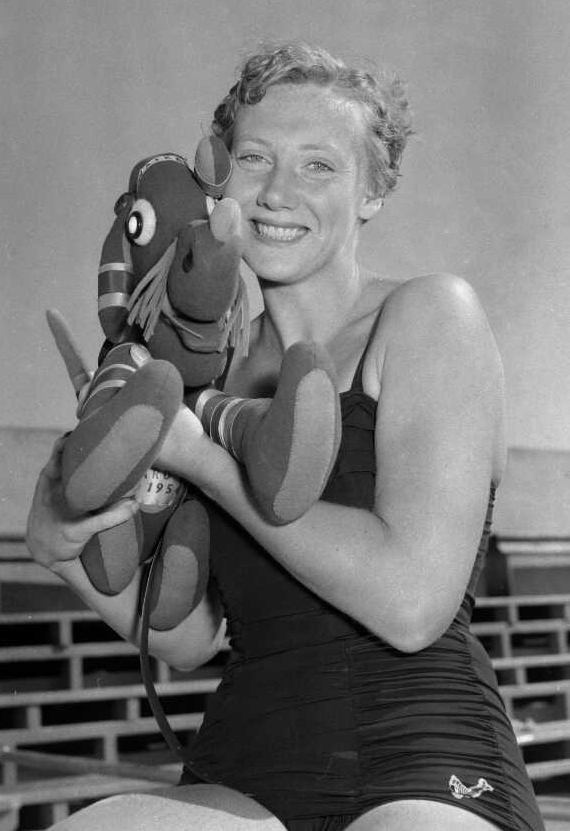
- Roe in 1955

Personal information
- Born: Marrion Douglass Roe; 3 April 1935 Invercargill, New Zealand
- Died: 29 June 2017 (aged 82) Whangārei, New Zealand
- Spouse: John Aitchison Beck (m. 1957; died 2010)

Achievements and titles
- National finals: 100 yd freestyle champion (1952, 1953, 1954, 1955, 1956); 220 yd freestyle champion (1954, 1956); 440 yd freestyle champion (1956)

Marrion Douglass Roe (later Beck; 3 April 1935 – 29 June 2017) was a New Zealand swimmer who represented her country at the 1954 British Empire and Commonwealth Games and the 1956 Summer Olympics.

== Biography ==
Born in Invercargill on 3 April 1935, Roe later moved to Hamilton, and represented Waikato at the New Zealand national swimming championships. In all, she won eight national swimming titles: the 100 yards freestyle every year from 1952 to 1956; the 220 yards freestyle in 1954 and 1956; and the 440 yards freestyle in 1956.

In 1954, Roe swam at the British Empire and Commonwealth Games in Cardiff. In the 110 yards freestyle, she finished fourth in the final, with a time of 1:08.9. She recorded a time of 5:34.7 in her heat of the 440 yards freestyle and did not progress to the final.

In February 1955, Roe swam what was at that time the fastest 100 yards freestyle in the Southern Hemisphere, recording a time of 59.0 seconds, which was 0.9 seconds outside Jody Braskamp's world record.

She competed in 100 metres and 400 metres freestyle at the 1956 Summer Olympics in Melbourne. In the 100 metres she finished in seventh place in the final with a time of 1:05.6, while in the 400 metres she swam 5:18.5 to finish fourth in her heat and did not progress to the final.

In early 1957, Roe married John Aitchison Beck, who was secretary of the Waikato Swimming Centre. On their honeymoon, she gave a demonstration at a swimming carnival in Gisborne.

Marrion Beck was widowed by the death of her husband in 2010. She died at Puriri Court Rest Home in Whangārei on 29 June 2017.
