= Tobruk Memorial Baths =

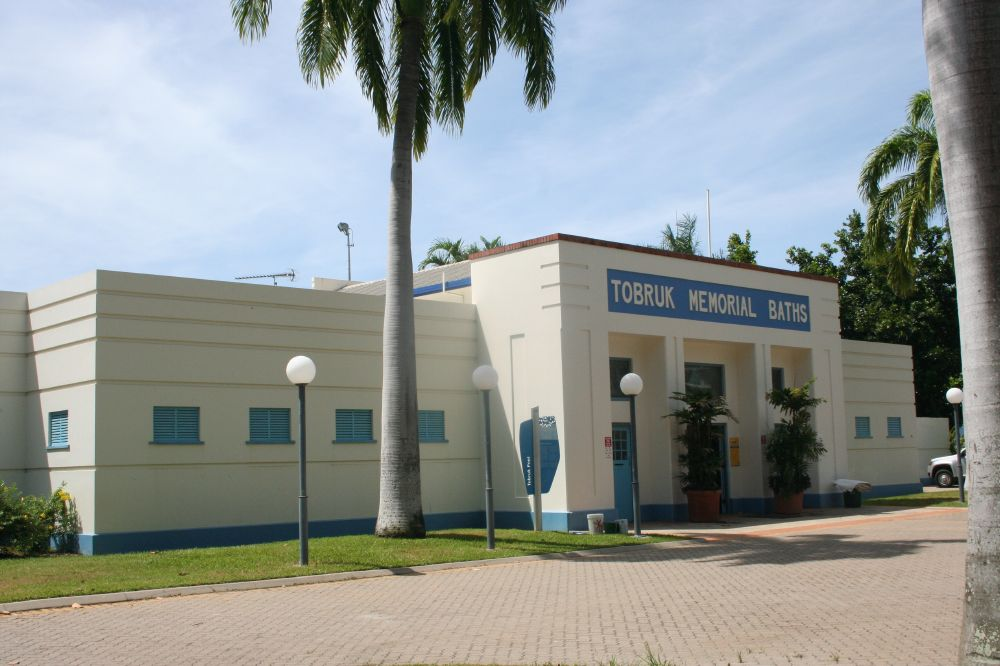
- Entrance to the Tobruk Memorial Baths, 2010

- Location within Queensland
- 19.2533°S 146.8198°E
- Location: The Strand, Townsville, City of Townsville, Queensland, Australia

History
- Design period: 1939–1945 (World War II)
- Built: 1941–1950

Queensland Heritage Register
- Official name: Tobruk Memorial Baths
- Type: state heritage (built)
- Designated: 13 January 1995
- Reference no.: 601575
- Significant period: 1940s (fabric); 1950–ongoing (social)
- Significant components: residential accommodation – manager's house/quarters, changing rooms/dressing shed, trees/plantings, memorial – swimming pool, memorial – plaque
- Builders: Townsville City Council

The Tobruk Memorial Baths is a heritage-listed complex of outdoor swimming pools on The Strand, Townsville CBD, City of Townsville, Queensland, Australia. It was built from 1941 to 1950 by Townsville City Council as a World War II memorial. The baths were added to the Queensland Heritage Register on 13 January 1995.

The Tobruk Memorial Baths features a 50-metre (160 ft) Olympic-size swimming pool, a 25-metre (82 ft) heated pool used for children's swimming, lessons and physiotherapy and a toddlers pool. There is an on-site kiosk. The facade is a vibrant blue-and-white art deco design.

== History ==
Tobruk Memorial Baths were commenced in 1941 and completed in 1950. An initiative of the Townsville City Council, the baths were intended initially simply as a civic amenity, to replace older city baths. In December 1941, however, the council decided to name the baths in honour of the Australian servicemen who had taken part in the Siege of Tobruk (Tubruq).

Tobruk Memorial Baths were erected on a site associated with sea bathing since at least the 1870s. The first European settlement at Townsville was concentrated in the area of Flinders Street East and The Strand, and The Strand and Cleveland Bay foreshore developed as one of the earliest recreation venues in Townsville. As early as 1866, Townsville's more affluent residents were constructing homes along the beachfront, and by 1872, three hotels had been erected opposite the present Anzac Memorial Park. The Strand was unformed at this time, being little more than a track along the foreshore, and there were no shade trees, but the beach was popular with bathers (mainly male) from at least the late 1870s.

In 1881 the town council planted 30 cedar trees along the foreshore, and added cocoa and betel nut trees in early 1882. In 1883, following strong public demand, a road was made along the beach front to Kissing Point. By 1889, The Strand, between King Street and Kissing Point, made a glorious promenade on a moonlight night when the breeze blows straight and cool from Magnetic Island, and a temporary reserve for public baths (R.182) adjacent to the present Anzac Memorial Park and opposite a quarry was gazetted in February that year. This reserve comprised an area of nearly 7 acres, extending from low water mark to a little above high water mark, on which the Townsville Municipal Council spent approximately £1,000 in erecting sea baths. Part of this reserve was occupied later by the Tobruk Memorial Baths.

The whole of the foreshore between King and Howitt Streets was gazetted a temporary reserve for public purposes in February 1901. A section of this, between the Cleveland and King Streets, was proclaimed a permanent reserve for park purposes in June 1912, and extended as far as the sea baths in 1926. From at least the 1920s, The Strand Park was a focus for Anzac Day activities. A memorial clocktower was erected in the park in 1923–1924, and in 1934 the name of the park was changed to Anzac Memorial Park. When the Tobruk Memorial Baths were constructed 1941–1950, their location along The Strand reflected not only the long association of the area with public swimming, but also with commemorative activity, iconography and place.

Work on the baths commenced in late 1941, as a city council initiative to provide Townsville with an Olympic standard pool. At the time there was considerable public opposition to the use of council finance for such an amenity during a war, and a petition was raised to the Queensland Government to have the project stopped. Cabinet found that the Townsville City Council had complied with the necessary formalities in relation to war-time building restrictions, the petition was rejected, and work went ahead until Townsville became an important base for the Allied offensive in the Pacific War in the first half of 1942.

In December 1941, at the height of the controversy, the Townsville City Council decided to name the baths as a memorial to the Australians who had fought and died during the Siege of Tobruk (Tubruq), in the Libyan desert campaign against Germany's "invincible" General Rommel. In one of the most famous sieges in Australian military history, Australia's 9th Division joined British forces in holding Tobruk against the German advance for 8 months. The Australian infantry, raiding and patrolling by day and night, dominated the no-man's land surrounding the Tobruk perimeter and took many prisoners.

After the war, work on the baths re-commenced, but was hampered by labour and materials shortages. Tobruk Memorial Baths finally opened to the public on 14 October 1950. They were opened officially on 26 November 1951 by Major-General WJ Windeyer, who was a senior officer at Tobruk. At the time, it was the only public memorial in Australia dedicated specifically to those who had participated in the Tobruk campaign. Inside the main entrance, the Townsville Sub-Branch of the Rats of Tobruk Association erected a marble plaque with the inscription:

This memorial stone is dedicated to the sacred memory of fallen comrades who served with the Navy, Army, and Air Force during the memorial siege of Tobruk, Western Desert, Great War II, from April 9, 1941 to December 13, 1941. We shall remember them.

Tobruk Memorial Baths were designed and constructed by the Townsville City Council's engineering and works departments, at a cost of approximately £60,000. When completed, the baths comprised a standard 8 lane, 50-metre (160 ft) long Olympic pool, graduating in depth from 3 feet 6 inches (1.07 m) to 10 feet (3.0 m), with the depths marked on the side, and a diving platform at the deep end; a toddlers' pool with depths ranging from a few inches to 2 feet 6 inches (0.76 m); dressing sheds with central courtyards to permit natural light and ventilation; a cafe; manager's accommodation; tubular metal grandstands with seating for 250 spectators, along the ocean side of the pool and above the service rooms at the northwestern end of the pool; concrete paving to three sides of the enclosure – the fourth, facing The Strand, was grassed; fencing; and gardens in front of the entrance pavilion, facing Anzac Memorial Park. Particular attention had been paid to lighting, with underwater lamps along the side of the pool, floodlights at either end of the pool which illuminated the length, and enclosure lighting. The main pool was tiled in blue and white, with the lanes demarked by black tiling, at a cost of £6,000. Externally, the entrance pavilion was painted "mist green", and internal walls were in "harvest buff".

The opening of the Tobruk Memorial Baths in 1950 re-introduced competitive swimming to Townsville, swimming carnivals having been discouraged during the war with the closure of the old city pool.

In 1953, the Reserve for Public Baths was amended as a 3 roods 17 perches site between the high water mark and the road reserve, containing the Tobruk Memorial Baths only. The sea baths, although no longer part of the Reserve, were maintained by the Townsville City Council until collapsing in 1981, at which time the council decided not to replace them.

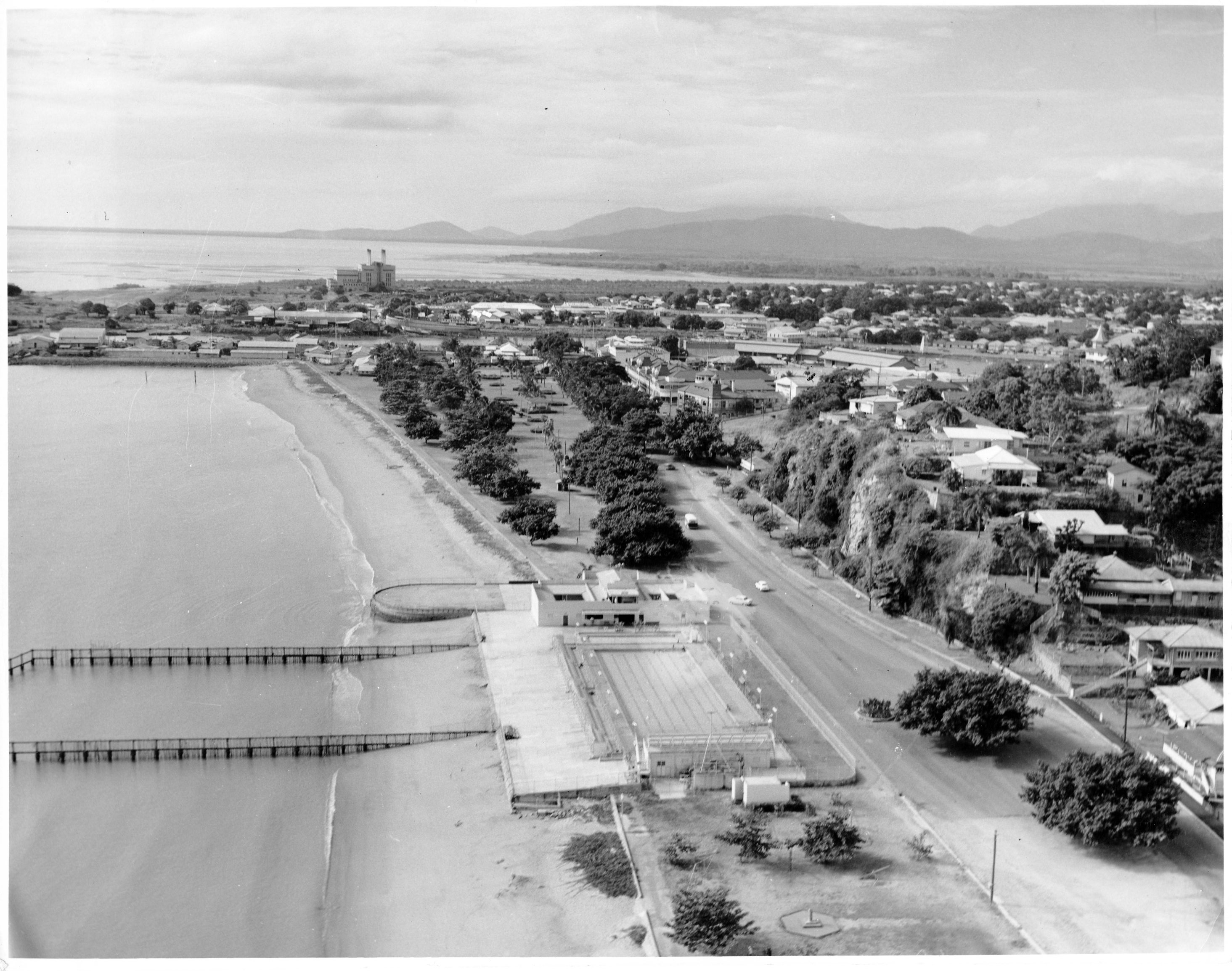
View of the Tobruk Memorial Baths with adjacent sea baths, 1957

With the absence of indoor Olympic pools in Australia at that time, the Tobruk Memorial Baths in Townsville was chosen as the best warm climate pool in Australia for winter training for the Australian swimming squad for the 1956 Melbourne Olympic Games and 1960 Rome Olympic Games. Team members include Australian swimming legends Dawn Fraser, Murray Rose and Lorraine Crapp. Six world records and 13 Australian records were set there in one night in 1956, with the footage featured on the first day of television broadcast in Melbourne. Training camps were also held prior to the 1958 Cardiff Commonwealth Games, and for the women's 1964 Tokyo Olympic Team. The 1956 and 1960 teams were the most successful at world level of any Australian swimming teams. The manager of the Tobruk Memorial Baths at that time was Allan "Stumpy" Lawrence. His son, Laurie Lawrence is also well known as one of Australia's leading swimming coaches.

Since 1987 the Townsville City Council, which previously operated the pool under a manager, now leases the complex to private enterprise. It remains a popular recreational venue in Townsville.

== Description ==
Tobruk Memorial Baths has a rendered masonry pavilion containing an entrance and changing rooms, with an open air Olympic size pool behind. A toddlers pool is between the entrance and the Olympic pool. There is a pitched corrugated iron roof hidden behind a parapet and the central entrance section is two-storeyed. The pavilion has three entrance doors containing etched glass panels with fish and sea horse motifs.

The Tobruk Memorial Baths have an attractive landscape setting, comprising grassed surrounds, linear perimeter plantings of Royal Palms (Roystonea regia) and other tropical vegetation including frangipani (Plumeria rubra).

== Heritage listing ==
Tobruk Memorial Baths was listed on the Queensland Heritage Register on 13 January 1995 having satisfied the following criteria.

The place is important in demonstrating the evolution or pattern of Queensland's history.

Tobruk Memorial Baths, constructed over the period 1941–50, are significant as Australia's most substantial public memorial to the Australians who fought and died during the Siege of Tobruk (Tubruq), a coastal town on the edge of the Libyan desert, from 9 April to 13 December 1941.

The place is important in demonstrating the principal characteristics of a particular class of cultural places.

Tobruk Memorial Baths is an example of a number of swimming pool complexes built in Queensland in the late 1940s and 1950s to commemorate the sacrifices made by those who served in the Second World War.

The place is important because of its aesthetic significance.

Tobruk Memorial Baths are a fine example of civic design, and incorporate motifs relating to swimming and the sea in the etched glass of the entrance doors. Tobruk Memorial Baths are situated adjacent to Anzac Memorial Park and The Strand. The baths and grounds contribute strongly to the aesthetic quality of the area through the distinctive architectural style of the entrance pavilion and the attractive landscaped setting.

The place has a special association with the life or work of a particular person, group or organisation of importance in Queensland's history.

The Tobruk Memorial Baths are historically significant due to their association with Australia's preparation for the 1956 and 1960 Olympic Games. The facility served as the winter training venue for prominent Australian Olympic gold medallists, including Dawn Fraser and John and Ilsa Konrads, who contributed to the increased status and popularity of competitive swimming within the country.
