= Zsuzsa Ördög =

Hungarian swimmer

Personal information
- Full name: Susie Ordogh
- Nationality: Hungarian
- Born: 16 April 1940 (age 86) Budapest, Hungary

Sport
- Sport: Swimming

Zsuzsa Ördög (born 16 April 1940) is a Hungarian former swimmer. She competed in the women's 100 metre freestyle at the 1956 Summer Olympics.
