= Charles Jonker =

South African cyclist (1933–1991)

Personal information
- Born: 13 December 1933 Port Elizabeth, South Africa
- Died: 31 July 1991 (aged 57) Kempton Park, Gauteng, South Africa

Cycling career
- Sport: Cycling

Charles Jonker (13 December 1933 – 31 July 1991) was a South African cyclist. He competed at the 1956 Summer Olympics and 1960 Summer Olympics.
