= Yukiko Otaka =

Japanese swimmer

Personal information
- Born: 2 January 1940 (age 86)

Sport
- Sport: Swimming
- Strokes: freestyle

Yukiko Otaka (大高 幸子, Ōtaka Yukiko; born 2 January 1940) is a Japanese former swimmer. She competed in two events at the 1956 Summer Olympics.
