= Natalie Myburgh =

South African swimmer (1940–2014)

Personal information
- Full name: Natalie Myburgh
- Nationality: South Africa
- Born: 15 May 1940
- Died: 21 January 2014 (aged 73)

Sport
- Sport: Swimming
- Strokes: freestyle
Medal record
Women's swimming
Representing South Africa
Olympic Games
Bronze medal – third place	1956 Melbourne	4x100 m freestyle relay
British Empire and Commonwealth Games
Gold medal – first place	1954 Vancouver	4×110 yd freestyle relay

Natalie Myburgh (15 May 1940 – 21 January 2014) was a South African swimmer. At the 1954 British Empire and Commonwealth Games in Vancouver, Canada, Myburgh teamed up with Felicity Loveday, Joan Harrison and Machduldt Petzer to win the 4×110 yards freestyle relay. Two years later at the 1956 Summer Olympics in Melbourne, Myburgh teamed up with Susan Roberts, Moira Abernethy and Jeanette Myburgh to win the 4 × 100 m freestyle relay.
