= Dennis Ford =

South African swimmer (1931–2009)

Personal information
- Full name: Dennis George Ford
- Born: 3 February 1931 East London, Eastern Cape, South Africa
- Died: 1 January 2009 (aged 77) Johannesburg, South Africa
- Spouse: Moira Abernethy (m. 1994)

Sport
- Sport: Swimming
Medal record
Men's swimming
Representing South Africa
British Empire and Commonwealth Games
Bronze medal – third place	1954 Vancouver	4×220 yd freestyle

Dennis George Ford (3 February 1931 – 1 January 2009) was a South African swimmer. He competed at the 1952 Summer Olympics and the 1956 Summer Olympics.
