= Viviane Gouverneur =

French swimmer

Personal information
- Nationality: française
- Born: 5 février 1940 (83 ans)

Sport
- Sport: Swimming

Viviane Gouverneur (born 1940) is a French former freestyle swimmer. She competed in two events at the 1956 Summer Olympics.
