= Odile Vouaux =

French swimmer (1934–2023)

Personal information
- Born: 20 July 1934 Saint-Dié-des-Vosges, France
- Died: 24 June 2023 (aged 88) Saint-Max, France

Sport
- Sport: Swimming

Odile Vouaux (20 July 1934 – 24 June 2023) was a French swimmer. She competed in two events at the 1956 Summer Olympics. Vouaux died in Saint-Max on 24 June 2023, at the age of 88.
