= Birgit Klomp =

German swimmer

Personal information
- Born: 27 April 1940 (age 86) Düsseldorf, Germany

Sport
- Sport: Swimming
- Club: Blau-Weiß Bochum
Medal record
Women's swimming
Representing West Germany
European Championships
Bronze medal – third place	1954 Turin	4×100 m freestyle

Birgit Klomp (born 27 April 1940) is a retired German freestyle swimmer who won a bronze medal at the 1954 European Aquatics Championships. She competed at the 1956 Summer Olympics in the 100 m and 4 × 100 m freestyle events and finished fourth in the relay. She won three national titles in the 100 m (1955, 1956) and 400 m freestyle (1955).

Her husband, Friedhelm Osselmann (b. 1934), is a retired German water polo player who competed in the 1956 and 1960 Olympics. Their son, Rainer Osselmann, competed in water polo at the 1984 and 1988 Olympics.
