= Ingrid Künzel =

German swimmer

Personal information
- Nationality: German
- Born: 29 January 1938 (age 88) Darmstadt, Germany

Sport
- Sport: Swimming

Ingrid Künzel (born 29 January 1938) is a German former swimmer. She competed in two events at the 1956 Summer Olympics.
