= Robin Lavine =

South African sports shooter

Personal information
- Born: 12 November 1936 (age 89)

Sport
- Sport: Sports shooting

Robin Lavine (born 12 November 1936) is a South African former sports shooter. He competed in the 50 metre rifle, three positions and the 50 metre rifle, prone events at the 1956 Summer Olympics.
