= Helen Stewart Hunt =

Canadian swimmer

Personal information
- Full name: Helen Moncrief Stewart Hunt
- Nationality: Canadian
- Born: 1938 (age 87–88) Vancouver, British Columbia
- Spouse: Edmund "Ted" Arthur Hunt (1958)

Sport
- Sport: Swimming
- Strokes: Freestyle
- Club: Vancouver Amateur SC; Canadian Dolphins SC; Vancouver, B.C.
- Coach: Percy Norman (VASC); Howard Firby, (VASC, Dolphins)
Medal record
Representing Canada
British Empire and Commonwealth Games
Silver medal – second place	1954 Perth	4×110yd freestyle relay
Pan American Games
Gold medal – first place	1955 Mexico City	100m freestyle
Silver medal – second place	1955 Mexico City	4×100m freestyle relay
Silver medal – second place	1955 Mexico City	4×100m medley relay

Helen Moncrieff Stewart Hunt (born 1938) is a Canadian former swimmer from Vancouver, formerly known as Helen Stewart during her early swimming career, who competed for Vancouver's Canadian Dolphin Swim Club and represented Canada at the 1956 Olympics. She played Canadian Championship volleyball through 1968.

== Early life ==
Helen Stewart Hunt was born in 1938, the daughter of William H. Stewart. Both her mother and father William would work as teachers. Helen attended Lord Byng Secondary School in Vancouver, graduating around the Spring of 1956. By age 11, Helen began swimming with the Vancouver Area Swim Club (VASC) around 1949 under Head Coach Percy Norman, and Assistant Coach Howard Firby. Widely recognized for his coaching accomplishments, Norman was a Canadian Coach for both the 1932, and 1936 Canadian Olympic team. In her earliest swimming development, Norman focused on Helen's basic stroke mechanics, then breathing, then helped her manage a balanced diet. Firby became Head Coach of VASC in 1956 when Norman retired. By 18, Helen swam for Hall of Fame Coach Howard Firby as one of the original seven members of the Canadian Dolphin Swim Club, which Firby founded with Helen's father William in 1956. Helen's younger sister Mary Beth, a future Canadian Olympian in swimming, was also one of the original members. Soon to be a dominant program, between 1956-1967, Firby's Vancouver Canadian Dolphin team won six Canadian National team titles, with the exception of the year 1965.

In October, 1956, Helen set an unofficial World Record in the 100-yard freestyle of 57.6 seconds. Helen attended Lord Byng High School in Vancouver, graduating around the Spring of 1956.

== 1956 Melbourne Olympics ==
She competed in two events at the 1956 Summer Olympics, with a tie for 14th overall in the 100-meter freestyle with a time of 1:06.9, and placed 5th in the 4×100 metres freestyle relay, making the finals with a combined team time of 4:28.3.

=== International competition ===
At the 1954 British Empire and Commonwealth Games, Stewart won a silver medal in the 4×110 yd freestyle relay. The next year, at the 1955 Pan American Games, she won a gold medal and two silver medals.

In 1956 at the U.S. Nationals, Helen captured silver in the 100m freestyle, and swimming the 100-yard freestyle, broke the standing world record.

== Marriage ==
On the evening of Thursday, May 22, 1958 Helen Moncrieff Stewart married Edmund "Ted" Arthur Hunt at the Canadian Memorial Church Chapel in Vancouver. A reception was held at the Faculty Club. Accomplished in lacrosse and skiing, Hunt played American style football for the University of B.C. Lions, and boxed for the University team, where he was nearly undefeated. Hunt had been a member of the Canadian Olympic Ski Jumping Team in 1952, and was a physical education graduate of U. British Columbia in 1957. He led the University of British Columbia Thunderbirds rugby team as well as the Kats Rugby Football Club. In their early marriage, Hunt was a professional football player for the BC Lions team, part of the Western Interprovisional Football Union (WIFU) league from 1957-59, and was named "Rookie of the Year" in his first year. Canadian football under the WIFU was close to American football in its rules with touchdowns and field goals. Hunt would receive a Masters in Physical Education from U of BC, and in 1976, would complete a PhD in Education from the University. He had a long teaching career with Vancouver High Schools, and would become a member of both the University of British Columbia and British Columbia Sports Halls of Fame.

=== Post-swimming pursuits ===
After her marriage and the 1959 Pan Americans, Helen retired from swimming competition and for three years coached for her former teams, the Vancouver Amateur Swim Club and the Canadian Dolphins in Vancouver. In the Spring of 1958, Helen had completed teacher training at the University of British Columbia in Vancouver. She would serve as a teacher and swim coach.

After her swimming career, she won four Canadian volleyball championships for Canada in 1964 and from 1966-68. She represented Canada at the Pan American Games volleyball competitions, placing sixth in 1967, and placing fifth in 1971.

=== Personal ===
She is the sister of former two time Canadian swimming Olympian Mary Stewart Hunt. Olympic snowboarder and politician Alexa Loo is her niece.

=== Honors ===
Most notably, Helen received the Beatrice Pines Trophy, given to the top Canadian woman swim competitor, successively from 1955-57.

In January 28, 1956, she was a recipient of the "Province Athlete of the Year" award, presented to her by Welterweight Champion boxer Jimmy McLarnin at Crystal Pool. She was also named British Columbia's "Athlete of 1955". She is a member of the British Columbia Sports Hall of Fame.
