= Kati Jansen =

German swimmer

Personal information
- Born: 12 February 1934 (age 92)

Sport
- Sport: Swimming
Medal record
Women's swimming
Representing West Germany
European Championships
Bronze medal – third place	1954 Turin	4×100 m freestyle

Katharine "Kati" Jansen (born 12 February 1934) is a retired German freestyle swimmer who won a bronze medal at the 1954 European Aquatics Championships. She competed at the 1952 and 1956 Summer Olympics in the 100 m and 4 × 100 m freestyle events and finished fourth in the relay in 1956.
