= Friedhelm Osselmann =

German water polo player

Personal information
- Nationality: German
- Born: 9 April 1934 (age 91); Duisburg, Germany

Sport
- Sport: Water polo

Friedhelm Osselmann (born 9 April 1934) is a German water polo player. He competed at the 1956 Summer Olympics and the 1960 Summer Olympics.
