= Margaret Gibson (swimmer) =

Australian swimmer

Personal information
- Born: 1 October 1938 (age 87) Sydney, Australia

Sport
- Sport: Swimming

Margaret Gibson (born 1 October 1938) is an Australian former swimmer. She competed in the women's 4 × 100 metre freestyle relay at the 1956 Summer Olympics.

== Early life ==
Gibson was born on 1 October 1938 in Sydney. She learned to swim at Glenelg Beach with her family.
