= Eiko Wada =

Japanese swimmer (born 1939)

Personal information
- Born: 14 April 1939 (age 87) Ehime, Japan

Sport
- Sport: Swimming
Medal record
Women's swimming
Representing Japan
Asian Games
Bronze medal – third place	1958 Tokyo	400 m freestyle

Eiko Wada (和田 映子, Wada Eiko; born 14 April 1939) is a Japanese former freestyle swimmer. She competed at the 1956 Summer Olympics and the 1960 Summer Olympics.
