= Joan Rosazza =

American swimmer

Personal information
- Full name: Joan Ann Rosazza
- National team: United States
- Born: May 19, 1937 (age 89) Torrington, Connecticut, U.S.
- Height: 5 ft 7 in (1.70 m)
- Weight: 130 lb (59 kg)

Sport
- Sport: Swimming
- Strokes: Freestyle
- Club: Women's Swim League (WSL) (Torrington, IN); Lafayette Swim Club (Lafayette, IN)
- College team: Lafayette Swim Club (Purdue Women's Swimmers)
- Coach: Doris Murphy (WSL); Dick Papenguth (Lafayette SC}
Medal record
Women's swimming
Representing the United States
Olympic Games
Silver medal – second place	1956 Melbourne	4×100 m freestyle

Joan Ann Rosazza (born May 19, 1937) is a former competitive swimmer and American record holder, who represented the United States at the 1956 Olympics and won a silver medal in the 4x100-meter freestyle relay.

== Early life and swimming ==
Rosazza was born May 19, 1937, in Torrington, Connecticut and first trained and competed with the Connecticut Women's Swim league under former 1924 Olympian Doris O'Mara Murphy. Rosazza was one of the founders of Torrington's Women's Swim League, which was at one time was affiliated with the Torrington YMCA. As a competitive swimmer, Coach Murphy swam with Gertrude Ederle, the first woman to swim the English channel. Murphy organized women's swimming groups throoughout Connecticut in the 1940s and 1950s. She later swam for the outstanding program at the Lafayette Swim Club in Lafayette, Indiana where she was trained and managed by Hall of Fame Coach Richard Papenguth.

== 1956 Olympics ==
At the 1956 Olympic trials, Rosazza finished second in the 100 freestyle, and was selected to compete for the U.S. Women's Olympic team.

She represented the United States as a 19-year-old at the 1956 Summer Olympics in Melbourne, Australia, where she won a silver medal in the women's 4×100-meter freestyle relay with Sylvia Ruuska, Shelley Mann and Nancy Simons, with the team swimming a combined time of 4:19.2. The American team finished under the standing world record, where in a close race, they were only two seconds behind the Australian team that took the gold with a new world record time of 4:17.1. Individually, she also competed in the women's 100-meter freestyle at the Olympics and finished fourth in the final with a time of 1:05.2.

In international competition, she captured a US title in the 4x100 free relay at the AAU indoor Championships in 1956–57. She again won the 4x100 freestyle relay at Daytona Beach in 1956, swimming with a team that set a world record-setting time in the event.

== Purdue University ==
Rosazza attended Purdue University, graduating in 1960 with a bachelor's degree in education. In a sense, she was part of a women's team at Purdue, as she trained and competed with Hall of Fame Coach Richard O. Papenguth's Lafayette Swim Club, which was composed almost entirely of Purdue's women swimmers. The university did not officially have a women's team, however, until years later. While swimming for the Lafayette Swim Club, Rosazza was part of a world record time for the 400-yard freestyle relay completing the event with a 3:56.8 at the National AAU Women's Indoor Championship in April 1956, bettering the old record by 2.4 seconds.

Swimming with the Lafayette Club in early December, 1955, Joan was part of four new American records, beginning with her individual 50-yard butterfly time of :21.1. In 3 relay events, she also helped set new American records for the 250-yard freestyle relay with a 2:17.9, the 200-yard medley relay with a time of 2:03.1, and the 800-yard freestyle relay with a time of 9:07.5. Recognized nationally for his work with women's swim teams, Papenguth served as the U.S. Women's Olympic Head Coach at the 1952 Olympics. The Lafayette Women's Club set world records and won national championships. As a pioneer in the training of competitive women swimmers, Papenguth believed in assigning demanding sets and long practices to his women's teams. He also coached the highly accomplished men's team at Purdue.

After graduating Purdue, Rosazza later attended Boston College, where she earned a master's degree in psychology and counseling. She served as a teacher for two schools, first at Winchester High School and then at Concord-Carlisle High School.

=== Honors ===
She received the Massachusetts Women in Athletics Distinguished Service Award in 1999.

== See also ==
- List of Boston College people
- List of Olympic medalists in swimming (women)
- List of Purdue University people
