= Nancy Simons =

American swimmer

Personal information
- Full name: Nancy Joan Simons
- National team: United States
- Born: May 20, 1938 (age 88) Oakland, California, U.S.
- Education: Northwestern University; Stanford University (1959)
- Spouse: Donald W. Peterson (m. 1959)
- Children: Daughter, Karen (b. 1966)

Sport
- Sport: Swimming
- Strokes: Freestyle
- Club: San Rafael Elks Swim Club; Chicago Town Club
- Coach: Beth Kaufman (San Rafael Elks SC); Walter Schlueter (Chicago Town Club)
Medal record
Women's swimming
Representing the United States
Olympic Games
Silver medal – second place	1956 Melbourne	4x100 m freestyle

Nancy Joan Simons (born May 20, 1938), later known by her married name Nancy Peterson in 1959, is an American former competition swimmer and a 1956 Melbourne Olympic silver medalist in the 4x100-meter women's freestyle relay. She was an American record holder in the 100 and 400-meter freestyle, if briefly. Swimming for San Rafael Elks Swim Club under Hall of Fame Coach Beth Kaufman and later the accomplished Chicago Town Club under Coach Walter Schlueter, in addition to her freestyle records, she demonstrated stroke proficiency first in backstroke and later won regional competitions in individual medley events. She attended Northwestern University for two years and, after transferring, graduated Stanford University in 1959.

== Early life and swimming ==
Simons was born May 20, 1938 in Oakland California to Mr. and Mrs. Arthur E. Simons, and began swimming by the age of five. By 12, she began training with the San Rafael Exchange Club, later the San Rafael Elks, and soon excelled in freestyle and backstroke in competition, capturing a first place in those events at the Northern California Championships for 12 and under girls in the Spring of 1951. While living in Belvedere, California, Simons graduated Sir Francis Drake High School on June 17, 1955, in San Anselmo, California, a town where her San Rafael Elks coach Beth Kaufman would live for several years. Simons was honored as a speaker at her graduation, belonged to four school clubs, was an outstanding student, and a member of the National Honor Society. Besides swimming, she enjoyed basketball, baseball, and skiing when she could find time away from her swimming career. In June 1954, Simons, as an outstanding Drake High School student, was selected at the end of her High School Junior year to attend the California Girls State Convention, sponsored by the American Legion Auxiliary. With a family history of service to America, Simons's paternal grandfather Manley H. Simons had a career as a U.S. Naval Admiral. Her future husband Donald Peterson would serve as a Naval officer as well.

=== Early competition highlights ===
Around her High School Sophomore year, at the 1952 Junior Olympics, she placed first and second in three national events in freestyle and backstroke in the 13-14 age group. In 1953, in the Northern Championships for California, she again won three age group events, and set national records for her age in two of the three events. With the San Rafael Elks, she was coached by International Swimming Hall of Fame inductee Beth Kaufman as early as June 1950, and continued to represent the Elks Club at least through 1953. Kaufman was one of the originators of age group swimming in America and chaired the National Age Group committee from its inception through the first critical ten years. In 1954, if briefly, Simons represented the San Francisco Crystal Plunge team coached by Hall of Fame Coach Charlie Sava, and swam unattached when she won the 250 freestyle at the Indoor Nationals in San Leandro on April 4, 1954. She later represented the Chicago Town Club in Chicago, Illinois. It seems unlikely Simons ever lived in Chicago throughout her time swimming for the Chicago Town Club during her High School years at Drake High School, as she swam at least through 1953 with the San Rafael Elks Swim Club in San Rafael, California, and was always assigned a California San Marin County area home location in her competition during High School, living in Kentfield, near San Rafael, and around 15 miles North of San Francisco. She also lived in Belvedere, Californial, eight miles South of San Rafael, and North of San Francisco. She swam and trained with the Chicago Town Club during her years at Northwestern University in 1955-56.

While representing the Chicago Town Club, she was trained and managed by Hall of Fame Coach Walter Schlueter. Well-known in the swimming community and highly accomplished, Schlueter mentored swimmers on every American Olympic team from 1948-1972. Schlueter was known as a stroke specialist in multiple strokes, and for teaching the rhythm method for pace, which centered on awareness of stroke count, and creating a race strategy that maximized stroke efficiency to conserve energy so a swimmer could plan when to accelerate against an opponent. An accomplished program, in 1950, prior to Simons's participation, the Chicago Town Club won the AAU National Team Championships.

=== Pre-Olympic competition ===
In 1954, Simons set a U.S. long course record in the 400-meter freestyle event. She also held a 200-yard freestyle record. She set a short-lived American record of 1:05.6 while representing the Chicago Town Club at the 100-meter freestyle preliminaries of the Women's National AAU swim meet on July 5, 1956 in Tyler, Texas. Her time was only .2 seconds over the world record for the event.

On February 19, 1956, at the Central AAU women's meet in Chicago, Simons won three events, leading the Chicago Club to the team championship. She was awarded the high point trophy at the meet for capturing the 400 yard individual medley in a record time of 5:58, the 200-yard backstroke with a time of 2:43.5, and the 500-yard freestyle in 6:38.6. She also swam in the 400-yard medley relay which placed first with a time of 4:55.6.

=== Collegiate education ===
With a partial scholarship, she attended Northwestern University, in the Chicago suburb of Evanston beginning around the fall of 1955, continuing to swim primarily for the Chicago Town Club, as Northwestern would have no Varsity women's swimming team until 1973. After two years at Northwestern, she transferred to Stanford University graduating in June, 1959.

== 1956 Melbourne Olympic gold ==
At a high point in her career, she represented the United States as an eighteen-year-old at the 1956 Summer Olympics in Melbourne, where she won a silver medal as a member of the second-place U.S. team in the women's 4×100-meter freestyle relay with Sylvia Ruuska, Shelley Mann and Joan Rosazza. The Australian women's team was strongly favored to win the event having soundly broken the standing world record two times in the prior eight weeks. The Australian team boasted three individual freestyle medalists and standout Dawn Fraser. In a closer race than some expected, the American women's 4x100 freestyle relay team swam a 4:19.2, finishing only 2.1 seconds behind the Australian team that swam a time of 4:17.1. American Shelley Mann, who swam second, helped the U.S. recover from a lead begun by Australian standout Dawn Fraser, despite Frasers slow start. At the 1956 Olympics, the Head U.S. Olympic coach for the women's team was Stan Tinkham, who spent some time working with Nancy at the Olympics and had formerly coached 4x100 relay teammate Shelley Mann.

Simons also competed individually in the women's 100-meter freestyle, but did not advance beyond the event semifinals, finishing in ninth place overall with a time of 1:06.1.

In 1957, she swam the 250-yard freestyle distance in 3:01.1, breaking a Central AAU record during the trials of the Chicago-wide Senior Women's Central AAU Indoor Swimming Meet in Chicago.

=== Marriage ===
In February, 1959, Nancy was engaged to Donald W. Peterson, and the couple married that summer. Having transferred from Northwestern, she was a Senior at Stanford University at the time, and graduated around June of 1959. Donald Peterson attended Oregon State, and completed a graduate degree in Business from Stanford in 1959, where the couple met. Peterson served as a Lieutenant in the U.S. Naval Reserve in 1959. The couple had children and welcomed son Michael Downes in September 1964 and daughter Karen Ann in October 1966 while living in Lucas Valley, California.

=== Honors ===
As a Senior at California's Sir Francis Drake High School, Nancy received the Seymour Memorial Award, presented to the most outstanding girl in the state, and one of the highest honors presented in California at the High School level. The award was sponsored and presented by the California Scholarship Foundation. Significant in the presentation of the award, was her straight A High School transcript. By her High School Senior year, Simons was also a recipient of a Bank of America Language Arts Certificate and cup and zone awards.

== See also ==
- List of Olympic medalists in swimming (women)
- List of Stanford University people
