= Valéria Gyenge =

Hungarian swimmer (born 1933)

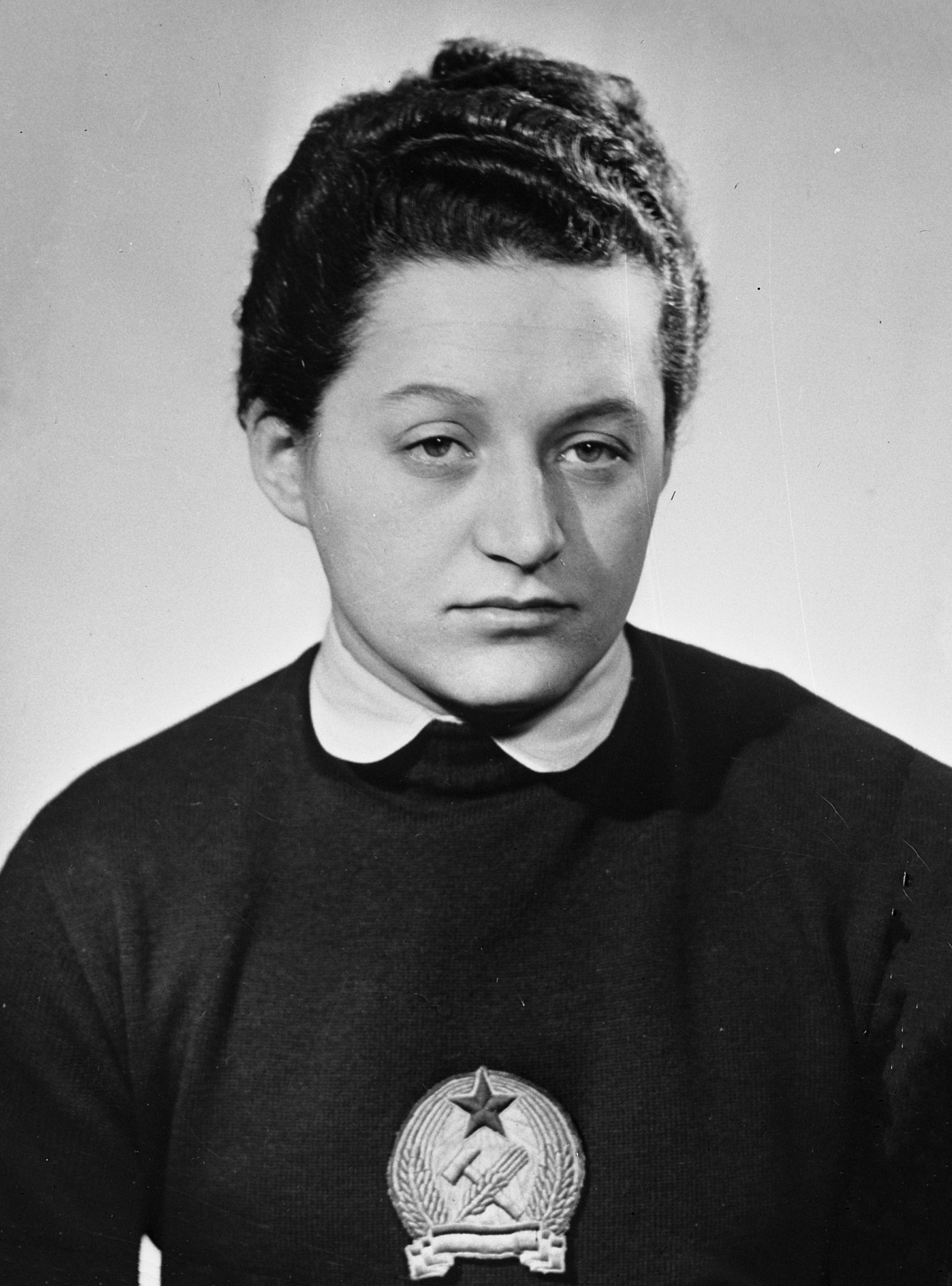
- Valéria Gyenge in 1956

Personal information
- Full name: Valéria Gyenge-Garay
- Nationality: Hungary
- Born: 3 April 1933 (age 93) Budapest, Hungary

Sport
- Sport: Swimming
- Strokes: Freestyle
- Club: Budapesti Lokomotiv Sport Club; Budapesti Törekvés SK
Medal record
Representing Hungary
Olympic Games
Gold medal – first place	1952 Helsinki	400 m freestyle
European Championships
Gold medal – first place	1954 Turin	4×100 m freestyle
Silver medal – second place	1954 Turin	400 m freestyle

Valéria Gyenge (born 3 April 1933) is a Hungarian swimmer who won the 400 m freestyle event at the 1952 Summer Olympics. She remained a leader in this event until 1956, but finished in a disappointing eighth place at the 1956 Olympics. In 1978, she was inducted into the International Swimming Hall of Fame.

== Family ==
Gyenge was a daughter-in-law of János Garay, a 1928 Olympic fencing champion who died in a German concentration camp in 1945. Her daughters Judy and Suzy as well as her sister-in-law Mària were also swimmers. After 1956 Olympics Gyenge moved to Canada, together with her fiancé and future husband János Garai, a water polo player. In Canada she swam for the EMAC Club in Toronto for a few months and then coached swimming for three years before becoming a photographer. Her daughter Soo Garay became an actress.

== See also ==
- List of members of the International Swimming Hall of Fame
- World record progression 800 metres freestyle

Records
Preceded by Ragnhild Hveger	Women's 800 metre freestyle world record holder (long course); 28 June 1953 – 14 January 1956	Succeeded by Lorraine Crapp
