= Marley Shriver =

American swimmer

- Shriver in swim gear circa 1956

Personal information
- Full name: Marley Lynn Shriver -Tobian
- National team: United States
- Born: February 13, 1937 Muskegon, Michigan, U.S.
- Died: February 13, 2016 (aged 79) New Castle, Colorado, U.S.
- Education: University of Southern California (Dental Hygiene '58)
- Occupations: Dental Hygienist; Professor of Dental Hygiene
- Height: 5 ft 7 in (1.70 m)
- Weight: 121 lb (55 kg)
- Spouses: Gary Tobian (1957); Later divorced
- Children: 2

Sport
- Sport: Swimming
- Event: 400 freestyle
- Strokes: Freestyle
- Club: Los Angeles Athletic Club

Marley Lynn Shriver (February 13, 1937 – February 13, 2016), also known for a period by her married name Marley Tobian, was an American former competition swimmer who represented the United States at the 1956 Summer Olympics in Melbourne, Australia, where she competed in the 400 meter freestyle placing fourth, and the 4x100 meter freestyle relay preliminary which later placed second with a different team, though having swum only in the 4x100 meter preliminaries, she was not eligible for a medal. She graduated the University of Southern California in 1958, and later worked as a dental hygienist in Colorado and as a Professor of Dental Hygiene at the University of Nebraska after obtaining her Doctorate. She returned to Colorado after retiring from her career in dental hygiene.

Shriver was born in Muskegon, Michigan on February 13, 1937, but moved to Los Angeles by her teen years. After arriving in the greater Los Angeles area, she swam and trained with the Los Angeles Athletic Club (LAAC) beginning around 1952.

In March, 1923, in her early career representing the Los Angeles Athletic Club in a stroke event, she placed second in the 200 backstroke at the Senior Southern Pacific AAU swim championships for women. In later competition, she finished in second place in one of her signature events, the 400 freestyle at the national American Athletic Union meet. In 1956, again competing in the 400 freestyle, she set a new American record of 5:13.8 in the event. In competition in other events, in 1956, she secured a third-place finish in the 1,500, 800, and 100 freestyle swims.

At the August, 1956 U.S. Olympic trials, at the Brennan Pools in Detroit's Rouge Park, Shriver secured a second-place finish overall, qualifying her for the U.S. Olympic team.

== 1956 Melbourne Olympics ==
At the age of 19, on December 7, 1956, Shriver placed fourth in the 400-meter freestyle at the Olympic finals of the 1956 Melbourne Olympics with a time of 5:12.9, finishing only 5.8 seconds from medal contention. Lorraine Crap of Australia, the pre-Olympic favorite, took the gold with a time of 4:54.6, with fellow Australian swimmer Dawn Fraser, taking second place with a strong finish for the silver with a time of 5:02.5. American Sylvia Ruuska took the bronze with a time of 5:07.1. Earlier on December 5, swimming in the second heat of the preliminaries, Shriver had set a new Olympic record of 5:07.6, and though it qualified her for the finals, Australia's Dawn Fraser and Lorraine Crap also set new Olympic records in their qualifying heats with faster times.

At her second event at the 1956 Melbourne Olympics, she swam for the second-place U.S. team in the qualifying heats of the women's 4×100-meter freestyle relay. Shriver was not eligible to receive a silver medal under the 1956 Olympic swimming rules, however, because she did not swim in the relay final.

Marley attended the University of Southern California from around 1954-1958 where she was a 1958 graduate. The college did not have a varsity women's swim team at the time, though Shriver continued to train and compete with the Los Angeles Athletic club at least through 1957.

=== Marriage ===
Shriver married 1956 Olympic diver Gary Tobian in August, 1957, at the First Congregational Church in Glendale, California. Tobian also swam with the Los Angeles Athletic Club having met Shriver there around 1953, and attended the University of Southern California as had Shriver. Shriver intended to retire from her swimming career after the marriage, though Tobian continued his training and competition. The couple would have two children, though later divorce.

After the 1956 Olympics, Shriver worked briefly in coaching. Once graduating USC, she completed their school of Dental Hygiene and worked as a Dental Hygienist in California. She later moved to Colorado to study for a Doctorate in Dental Hygiene. After relocating to Nebraska, she served for a decade at the University of Nebraska as a Dental Hygiene professor.

She returned to Colorado after retiring from her career in Dental hygiene and as a professor in Nebraska. There she took up hiking and skiing as avocations, and continued to ski into her 70's. In her retirement, she enjoyed fishing, scrabble, and jigsaw puzzles.

Marley died on her 79th birthday at her home in New Castle, Colorado having suffered from lung cancer. She was survived by two children and grandchildren.
