= Elizabeth Fraser (swimmer) =

Australian swimmer

Personal information
- Nationality: Australian
- Born: 7 April 1941 (age 85)

Sport
- Sport: Swimming

Elizabeth Fraser (born 7 April 1941) is an Australian former swimmer. She competed in the women's 4 × 100 metre freestyle relay, at the 1956 Summer Olympics.
