= Anita Hellström =

Swedish swimmer

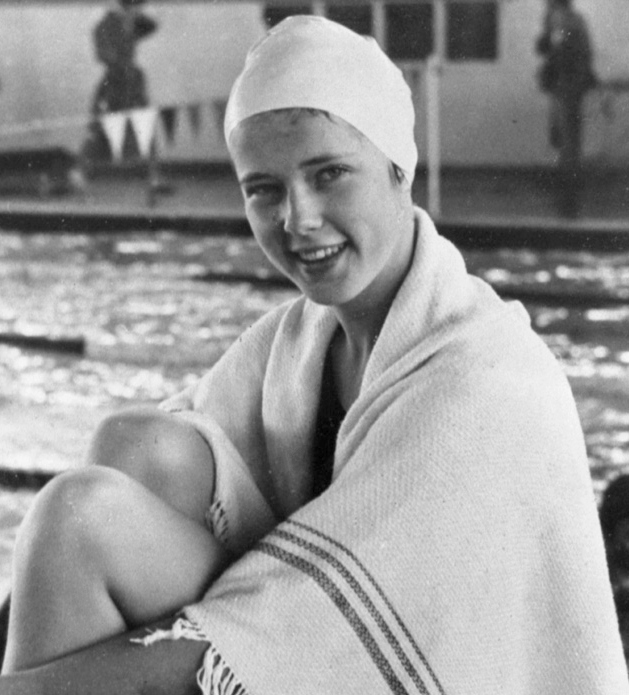

Personal information
- Born: 13 June 1940 (age 86) Söderhamn, Sweden

Sport
- Sport: Swimming
- Strokes: Freestyle
- Club: SK Neptun, Stockholm

Ingegärd Anita Hellström (later Stockwell, also Meredith, also “Nielsen”, born 13 June 1940) is a retired Swedish freestyle swimmer. She competed at the 1956 Summer Olympics in the 100 m, 400 m and 4 × 100 m events and finished sixth in the relay.
