= Lorraine Crapp =

Australian swimmer (born 1938)

Lorraine Crapp AM
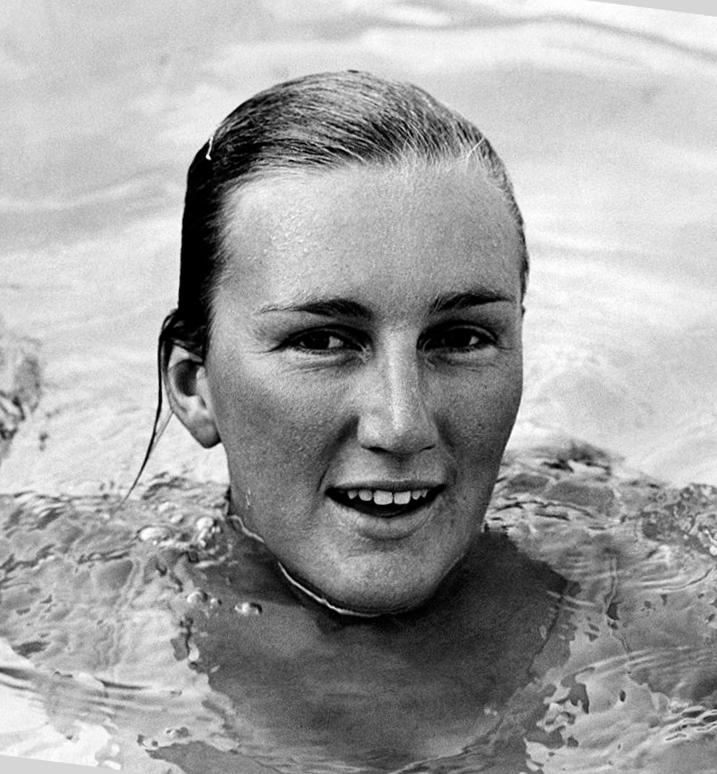
- Crapp at 1960 Olympics

Personal information
- Full name: Lorraine Joyce Crapp
- National team: Australia
- Born: 1 October 1938 (age 87) Sydney, New South Wales
- Height: 1.67 m (5 ft 6 in)

Sport
- Sport: Swimming
- Strokes: Freestyle
Medal record
Women's swimming
Representing Australia
Olympic Games
Gold medal – first place	1956 Melbourne	400 m freestyle
Gold medal – first place	1956 Melbourne	4×100 m freestyle
Silver medal – second place	1956 Melbourne	100 m freestyle
Silver medal – second place	1960 Rome	4×100 m freestyle
British Empire and Commonwealth Games
Gold medal – first place	1954 Vancouver	110 yd freestyle
Gold medal – first place	1954 Vancouver	440 yd freestyle
Gold medal – first place	1958 Cardiff	4×110 yd freestyle
Silver medal – second place	1958 Cardiff	110 yd freestyle
Bronze medal – third place	1954 Vancouver	3×110 yd medley
Bronze medal – third place	1958 Cardiff	440 yd freestyle

Lorraine Joyce Thurlow, AM (born 1 October 1938), née Crapp, is a former Olympic swimming champion representing Australia. In world swimming history, Crapp earned a place as the first woman to break the five-minute barrier in the 400 m freestyle.

Born in 1938, as a young girl Crapp lived with her parents at Jervis Bay where her father was with a Royal Australian Air Force Air Sea Rescue Unit. By the age of five she was a competent swimmer. When the family moved to Mortlake she joined the Cabarita Swimming Club and by the age of 12 was the winner of all her age events in freestyle, backstroke and breaststroke.

In 1952, Crapp was selected in the New South Wales team for the Australian Championships in Melbourne, where she came second to Olympian Judy Davis in the senior 880 yards. She won the junior 200 yards and she was still only 13 years old.

In 1954, Crapp won the 110 yard freestyle and 440 yard freestyle gold medals and a bronze medal in 3×110 yard medley relay at the British Empire and Commonwealth Games in Vancouver at the age of 15.

In 1956, Crapp broke 17 world records and by the end of the year she was the world record holder for 110 yards, 200 m, 400 m and 880 yards. She was the first Australian swimmer, male or female, to hold world records in all freestyle distances at the same time. On 25 August 1956 at the Australian National Training Camp at Tobruk Pool in Townsville, Queensland, she became the first woman to break the five minute barrier for 400 m freestyle; along the way she broke three other world records – 200 m, 220 yd and 440 yd. Although she improved on all times later in her career, her four world records in one swim (she slashed 18.2 seconds from the previous 400 m record to clock 4 min 47.2 seconds), made headlines around the world.

She competed in two Olympic Games — the 1956 Summer Olympics and the 1960 Summer Olympics. She won two Olympic gold medals and one Olympic silver medal in 1956 and one Olympic silver medal in 1960. Crapp's 16-year-old cousin Robert Crapp was one of the 1956 Olympic Torch Bearers selected to relay the Olympic Flame 2750 miles from Cairns to Melbourne with each runner carrying the flame 1 mile.

In 1956, Crapp won the Olympic 400 m freestyle (Olympic record) title easily when she beat teammate Dawn Fraser by 7.9 seconds in a time which was 17.5 seconds inside the previous Olympic record. Fraser reversed this result in the 100 m freestyle (both beating the previous world record) and the pair then combined with Faith Leech and Sandra Morgan to win gold for Australia in the 4 × 100 m freestyle relay (world record).

In 1957, Crapp was awarded the city of Genoa Christopher Columbus Trophy as the outstanding athlete in the world.

In 1958, Crapp won a gold medal in the 4×110 yards freestyle relay, a silver medal in the 110 yards freestyle and a bronze in the 440 yards freestyle at the 1958 British Empire and Commonwealth Games in Cardiff but she was never again a world record breaker.

In 1960, Crapp bowed out of international competition with a silver medal in the 4 × 100 m freestyle relay at the Rome Olympics. On the eve of her departure for the 1960 Rome Games, Crapp married Dr. Bill Thurlow, a medical officer attached to the Australian team. In 1964, Thurlow won a 100,000 pounds lottery prize, which he planned to use for setting up a health centre for disabled people.

During her career Crapp set 23 world records and won 9 Australian championship titles. In 1972, she was inducted into the International Swimming Hall of Fame, and in 1986 into the Sport Australia Hall of Fame. On 8 June 1998, she was named as Member of the Order of Australia for "service to sport, particularly swimming at national and international levels, and to the community through the promotion of sport and the benefits of a healthy lifestyle."

On 8 February 2000, Crapp was awarded the Australian Sports Medal in recognition of her and teammates' efforts in winning the 4 × 100 m freestyle relay at the 1956 Olympics. The same year she was one of the eight flag bearers at the opening ceremony of the 2000 Summer Olympics in Sydney. On 1 January 2001, Crapp was awarded the Centenary Medal for "service to Australian society through the sport of swimming." On 9 November 2023, she was inducted into the Swimming Australia Hall of Fame.

Lorraine Crapp is one of nine "Legends" of the Path of Champions at Sydney Olympic Park Aquatic Centre.

== See also ==
- List of members of the International Swimming Hall of Fame
- List of Olympic medalists in swimming (women)
- World record progression 100 metres freestyle
- World record progression 200 metres freestyle
- World record progression 400 metres freestyle
- World record progression 800 metres freestyle
- World record progression 4 × 100 metres freestyle relay
