= Héda Frost =

French swimmer

Personal information
- Full name: Edwige Frost
- Born: 15 September 1936 (age 90) Algiers, Algeria

Sport
- Sport: Swimming

Edwige "Héda" Frost (born 15 September 1936) is a French former freestyle swimmer. She competed at the 1956 Summer Olympics and the 1960 Summer Olympics.
