= Moira Abernethy =

South African swimmer (born 1939)

Personal information
- Born: 29 May 1939 (age 87)
- Spouse: Dennis Ford (m. 1994; died 2009)

Sport
- Sport: Swimming
Medal record
Women's swimming
Representing South Africa
Olympic Games
Bronze medal – third place	1956 Melbourne	4×100 m freestyle

Moira Abernethy-Ford (born 29 May 1939) is a South African former backstroke and freestyle swimmer who competed in the 1956 Summer Olympics.
