= Jeanette Myburgh =

South African swimmer (born 1940)

Personal information
- Born: September 16, 1940 (age 85)

Sport
- Sport: Swimming
Medal record
Representing South Africa
Olympic Games
Bronze medal – third place	1956 Melbourne	4x100 m freestyle relay

Jeanette Myburgh (born 16 September 1940) is a South African former swimmer who competed in the 1956 Summer Olympics.
