= Dawn Fraser =

Australian swimmer and politician

Dawn Fraser AC MBE OLY
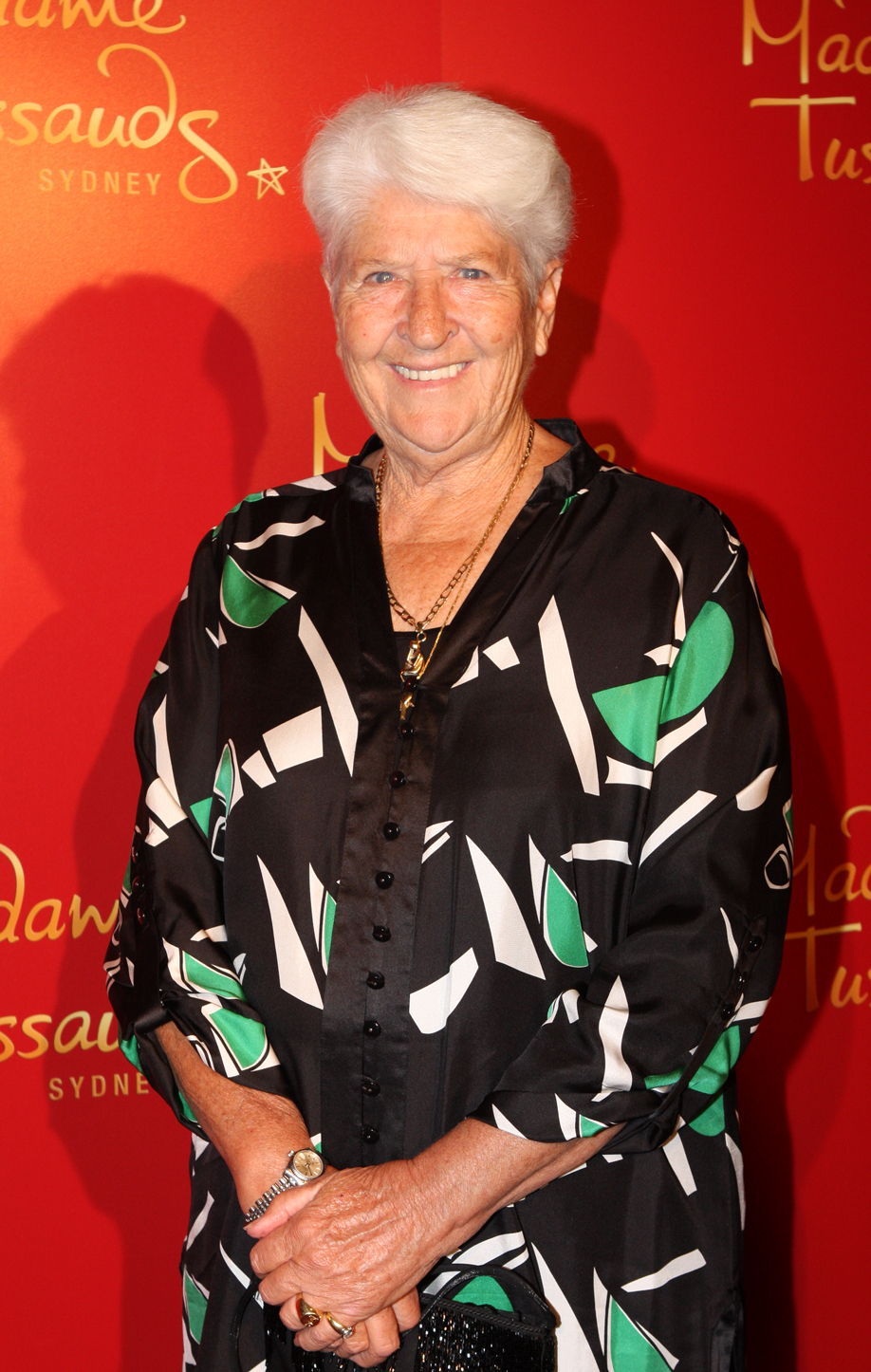
- Dawn Fraser in May 2012

Personal information
- Nickname: "Dawny"
- National team: Australia
- Born: 4 September 1937 (age 89) Balmain, Sydney, Australia
- Height: 1.72 m (5 ft 8 in)
- Weight: 67 kg (148 lb)

Member of the New South Wales Parliament for Balmain
- In office 19 March 1988 – 25 May 1991
- Preceded by: Peter Crawford
- Succeeded by: District abolished

Sport
- Sport: Swimming
- Strokes: Freestyle, butterfly
Medal record
Women's swimming
Representing Australia
Olympic Games
| Gold medal – first place | 1956 Melbourne | 100 m freestyle |
| Gold medal – first place | 1956 Melbourne | 4×100 m freestyle |
| Gold medal – first place | 1960 Rome | 100 m freestyle |
| Gold medal – first place | 1964 Tokyo | 100 m freestyle |
| Silver medal – second place | 1956 Melbourne | 400 m freestyle |
| Silver medal – second place | 1960 Rome | 4×100 m freestyle |
| Silver medal – second place | 1960 Rome | 4×100 m medley |
| Silver medal – second place | 1964 Tokyo | 4×100 m freestyle |
British Empire and Commonwealth Games
| Gold medal – first place | 1958 Cardiff | 110 yd freestyle |
| Gold medal – first place | 1958 Cardiff | 4×110 yd freestyle |
| Gold medal – first place | 1962 Perth | 110 yd freestyle |
| Gold medal – first place | 1962 Perth | 440 yd freestyle |
| Gold medal – first place | 1962 Perth | 4×110 yd freestyle |
| Gold medal – first place | 1962 Perth | 4×110 yd medley |
| Silver medal – second place | 1958 Cardiff | 440 yd freestyle |

Dawn Fraser (born 4 September 1937) is an Australian freestyle champion swimmer, eight-time Olympic medalist, a 15-year world record holder in the 100-metre freestyle, and a former politician. The winner of countless honours, she has enjoyed national prominence and controversy and sparked national pride in Australia. She is one of only four swimmers to have won the same Olympic individual event three times—in her case, the women's 100-metre freestyle.

== Early life ==
Fraser was born in the Sydney suburb of Balmain, New South Wales, in 1937 into a poor working-class family, the youngest of eight children. Her father, Kenneth Fraser, was from Embo, Scotland. She was spotted at the early age of 14 by Sydney coach Harry Gallagher swimming at the local harbourside baths.

== Swimming career ==
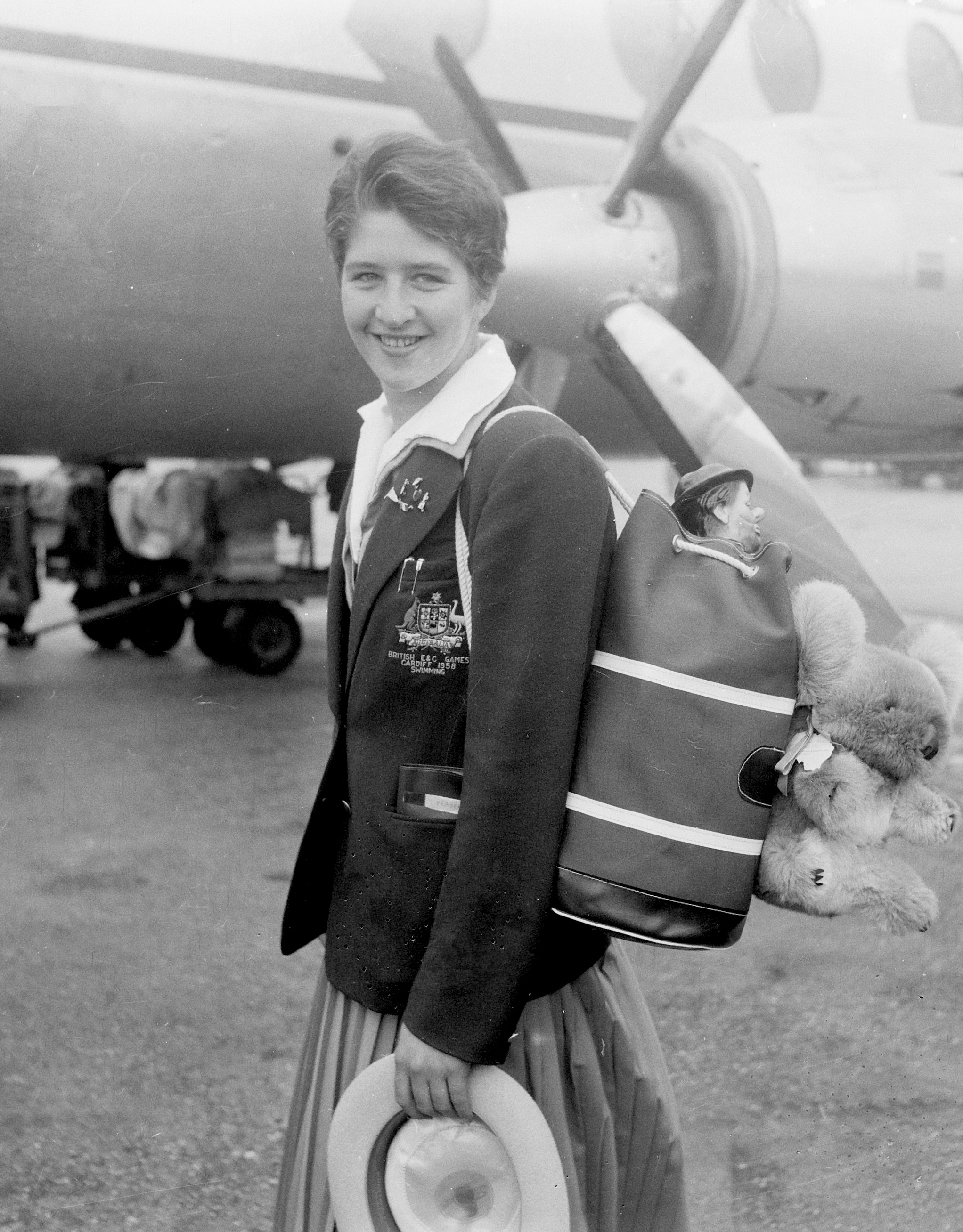
Fraser in 1958

As a highlight of her swimming career, Fraser held 39 records and won eight Olympic medals for Australia, including four gold. Adding to her popularity in her native country and the British Commonwealth, she captured six Commonwealth Games gold medals. She dominated the high profile 100 metres freestyle event, holding the record for 15 years from 1 December 1956 to 8 January 1972.

She is the first of only four swimmers in Olympic history (Hungarian Krisztina Egerszegi and Americans Michael Phelps and Katie Ledecky being the three others) to have won individual gold medals for the same event at three successive Olympics (100 metres freestyle – 1956, 1960, 1964).

In October 1962, she became the first woman to swim the 100 metres freestyle in less than one minute setting the record of 59.9, a feat that elevated her to national prominence and made her a hero in Australia, where swimming was a popular sport. It was not until 1972, eight years after Fraser retired, that her 100 m record of 58.9 seconds was broken.

Several weeks before the 1964 Olympics, Fraser was injured in a car crash that injured a vertebra and resulted in the death of her mother, Rose. Her sister and a friend were also travelling in Fraser's car during the accident, but survived. This was a fresh tragedy for Fraser and her family following her older brother's death from leukaemia in 1950, and her father's death from cancer in 1960.

=== 1964 Summer Olympics incidents and ban from swimming ===
During the 1964 Summer Olympics in Tokyo, Fraser angered swimming team sponsors and the Australian Swimming Union (ASU) by marching in the opening ceremony against their wishes (it was too close to the competition date), and wearing a swimming costume from the competitor of the sponsor in competition, as she found it more comfortable. She was also accused of stealing an Olympic flag from a flagpole outside Emperor Hirohito's palace, the Kōkyo. She was arrested but released without charge. In the end she was given the flag as a souvenir.

Fraser later denied having swum the moat to steal the flag, telling The Times in 1991: "There's no way I would have swum that moat. I was terrified of dirty water, and that moat was filthy. There's no way I'd have dipped my toe in it." The Australian Amateur Swimming Association banned Fraser from competitive swimming for 10 years.

== Post-swimming activities ==
Fraser became a publican at the Riverview Hotel, Balmain, and took up swim coaching.

In 1988, Fraser was elected as an independent to the New South Wales Legislative Assembly for the seat of Balmain. The Balmain electorate was abolished in 1991, and after failing to win the new seat of Port Jackson, she retired from politics.

In 1997, Fraser told the ABC: "I mean I wish I could be as outspoken, I suppose, as Pauline Hanson and say, 'look, I'm sick and tired of the immigrants that are coming into my country.'" Fraser also stated her interest in joining Hanson's One Nation Party.

In 2015, during an interview on the Today program, Fraser was asked about recent behaviour of Nick Kyrgios at Wimbledon and Bernard Tomic’s comments about Tennis Australia, which resulted in Tomic being removed from the Davis Cup team. Fraser said, "They should be setting a better example for the younger generation of this country ... If they don’t like it, go back to where their fathers or their parents came from". (Kyrgios is of Malay and Greek ancestry, while Tomic is of Croat extraction.) Kyrgios responded by describing her as a "blatant racist", and Fraser's comments were criticised by Australia’s Race Discrimination Commissioner Tim Soutphommasane. Fraser "unreservedly" apologised for her comments.

== Personal life ==
Fraser married Gary Ware on 30 January 1965 at St. Stephen’s Church, Macquarie Street, Sydney. The marriage was short-lived. She has one daughter from the marriage, who has a son. She and her family live in Noosa on the Sunshine Coast in Queensland. This move north from Sydney to the warmer, subtropical climate of Noosa was intended to reduce the breathing problems caused by Fraser's asthma, as the warmer air and increased vitamin D from sunlight are beneficial for the condition.

Fraser is the great-aunt of Canadian soccer player Danielle Steer.

== In popular culture ==
In 1979, a movie called Dawn! was made about Fraser's life and career. It starred Bronwyn Mackay-Payne as Fraser.

Fraser was played by Melissa Thomas in the 2003 film Swimming Upstream. Fraser herself is credited in the film as Dawn Fraser's coach. On 1 September 2015, Dawn Fraser featured on Season 7, Episode 5, of the SBS genealogy television series Who Do You Think You Are?, which traced her heritage back to South America.

== Honours ==
Lauded as an Australian hero, Fraser was named the Australian of the Year in 1964, was inducted into the International Swimming Hall of Fame in 1965, was made a Member of the Order of the British Empire (MBE) using her married name Dawn Ware in 1967, and was appointed an Officer of the Order of Australia (AO) in 1998. She was named Australian Female Athlete of the Century by the Sport Australia Hall of Fame, who had inducted her as their first female member in 1985. In 1999 the International Olympic Committee named her the World's Greatest Living Female Water Sports Champion. On 14 July 2000, Fraser was awarded the Australian Sports Medal for "outstanding contribution as a swimming competitor".

She was one of the bearers of the Olympic Torch at the opening ceremony of the 2000 Summer Olympics in Sydney. She carried the Olympic Torch at the stadium as one of the bearers for the final segment, before the lighting of the Olympic Flame.

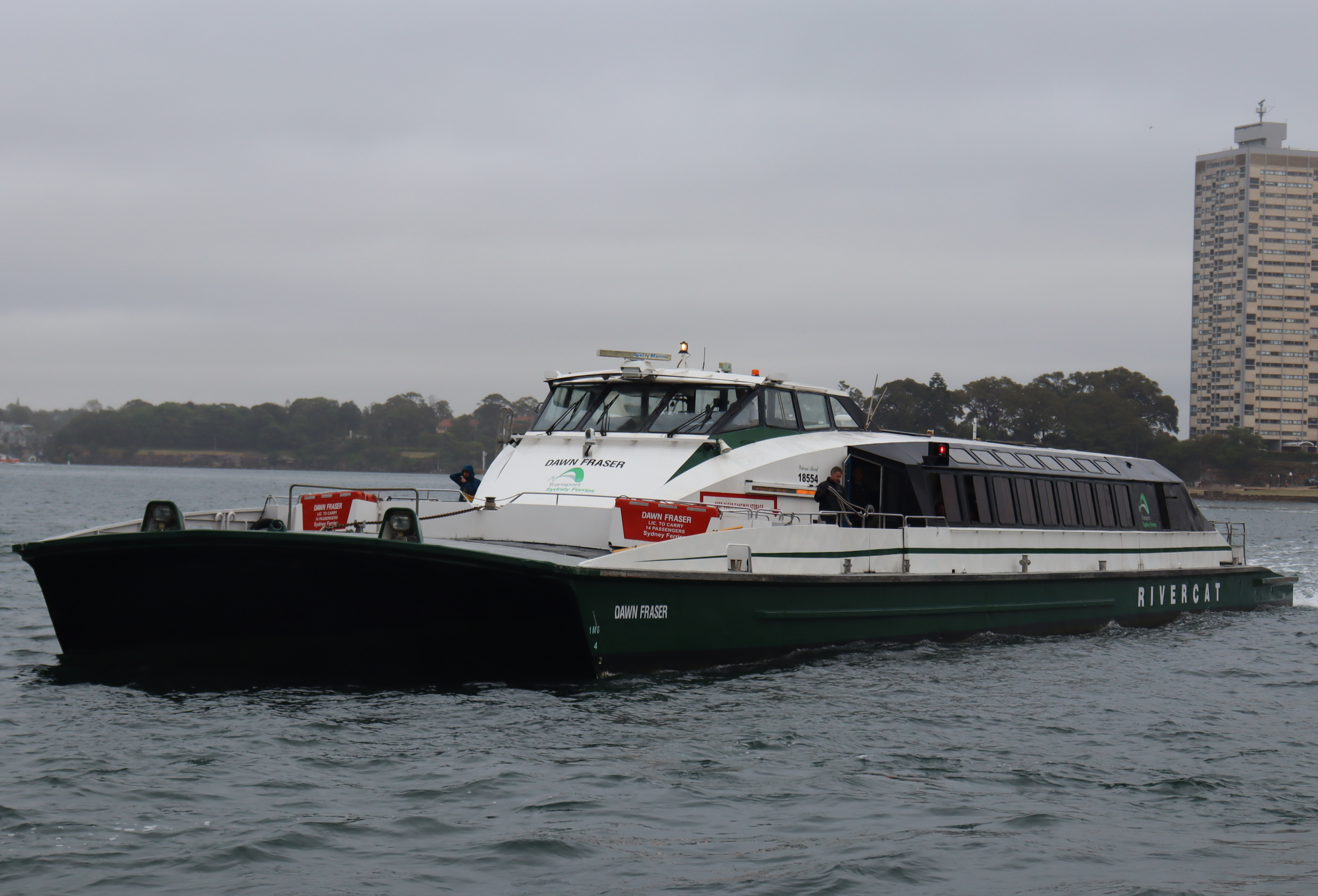
MV Dawn Fraser Arriving into Milsons Point ferry wharf

The Australian Sport Awards include an award named in honour of and presented by Fraser. The harbourside baths in Balmain where she swam were named the Dawn Fraser Swimming Pool in her honour in 1964, and in 1992, the State Transit Authority named a RiverCat ferry after Fraser.

She was inducted onto the Victorian Honour Roll of Women in 2001.

As part of the 2018 Queen's Birthday Honours she was advanced to a Companion of the Order of Australia (AC).

In 2022, she was an inaugural inductee of the Swimming Australia Hall of Fame.

== Olympic accomplishments ==
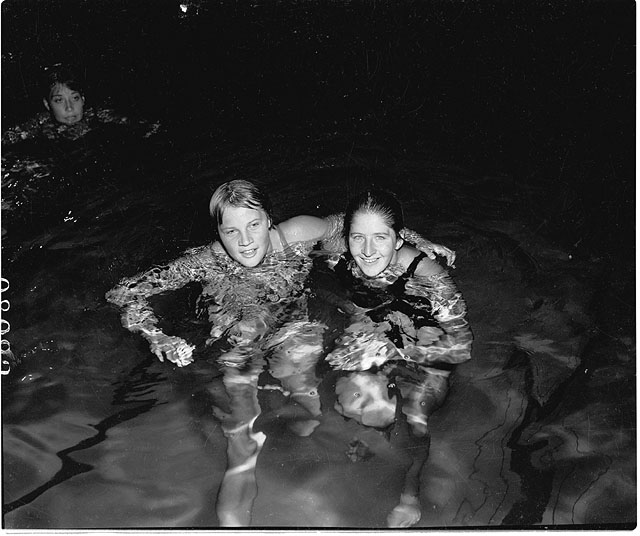
Dawn Fraser and Ilsa Konrads at the Australian National Swimming Championships and Olympic Trials, North Sydney Olympic Pool, 27 February 1960

| Event | Time | Place | |
1956 Summer Olympics
| 100m Freestyle | 1:02.0 | Gold | WR |
| 400m Freestyle | 5:02.5 | Silver | |
| 4 × 100 m Freestyle Relay | 4:17.1 | Gold | WR |
1960 Summer Olympics
| 100m Freestyle | 1:01.2 | Gold | OR |
| 400m Freestyle | 4:58.5 | 5th | |
| 4 × 100 m Freestyle Relay | 4:11.3 | Silver | |
| 4 × 100 m Medley Relay | 4:45.9 | Silver | |
1964 Summer Olympics
| 100m Freestyle | 59.5 | Gold | OR |
| 400m Freestyle | 4:47.6 | 4th | |
| 4 × 100 m Freestyle Relay | 4:06.9 | Silver | |
| 4 × 100 m Medley Relay | 4:52.3 | 9th | |

- 1962 Perth Commonwealth Games
  - 110 yards freestyle – gold medal
  - 440 yards freestyle – gold medal
  - 4 × 110 yards (4 × 100.58 metres) freestyle relay – gold medal
  - 4 × 110 yards (4 × 100.58 metres) medley relay – gold medal

== See also ==
- List of members of the International Swimming Hall of Fame
- List of multiple Olympic gold medalists
- List of multiple Olympic gold medalists in one event
- List of multiple Summer Olympic medalists
- List of Olympic medalists in swimming (women)
- World record progression 100 metres freestyle
- World record progression 200 metres freestyle
- World record progression 4 × 100 metres freestyle relay

New South Wales Legislative Assembly
| Preceded by Peter Crawford | Member for Balmain; 1988–1991 | District abolished |
Records
| Preceded by Willy den Ouden | Women's 100 metre freestyle world record holder (long course); 21 February 1956 – 3 March 1956 | Succeeded by Cocky Gastelaars |
| Preceded by Cocky Gastelaars | Women's 100 metre freestyle world record holder (long course); 25 August 1956 – 20 October 1956 | Succeeded by Lorraine Crapp |
