= Sylvia Ruuska =

American swimmer (1942–2019)

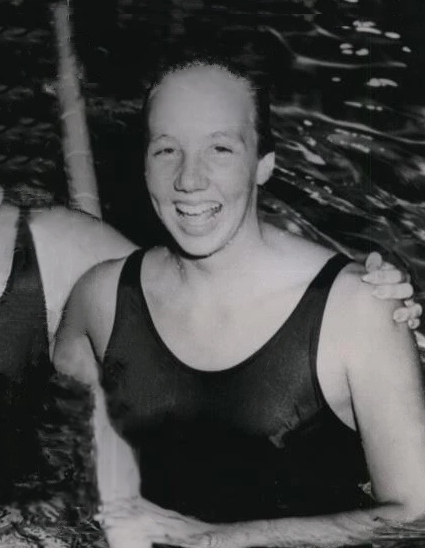
- Ruuska in 1959

Personal information
- Full name: Sylvia Eliina Ruuska
- National team: United States
- Born: July 4, 1942 Berkeley, California, U.S.
- Died: February 7, 2019 (aged 76)
- Height: 5 ft 8 in (1.73 m)
- Weight: 139 lb (63 kg)

Sport
- Sport: Swimming
- Strokes: Freestyle, individual medley
- Club: Berkeley YMCA
Medal record
Women's swimming
Representing the United States
Olympic Games
Silver medal – second place	1956 Melbourne	4x100 m freestyle
Bronze medal – third place	1956 Melbourne	400 m freestyle
Pan American Games
Silver medal – second place	1959 Chicago	400 m freestyle

Sylvia Eliina Ruuska (July 4, 1942 – February 7, 2019) was an American competitive swimmer, Olympic medalist and former world record-holder in two events.

At the age of 14, Ruuska won two medals at the 1956 Summer Olympics in Melbourne, Australia. She captured a silver medal by swimming for the second-place U.S. team in the women's 4×100-meter freestyle relay. Individually, she also received a bronze medal for her third-place finish in the women's 400-meter freestyle.

On June 27, 1958, she became the first woman to set an official world record in the 400-meter individual medley, clocking 5:46.6. Ruuska subsequently broke her own 400-meter record three times in 1958 and 1959, ultimately lowering the world mark to 5:40.2 on July 17, 1959. She also set a new world record of 2:43.2 in the 200-meter individual medley on August 16, 1958, and breaking her own record with a time of 2:40.3 on January 14, 1959. Both her 200-meter and 400-meter individual medley world records were later broken by Donna de Varona. At the 1959 Pan American Games in Chicago, she won a silver medal for her second-place showing in the 400-meter freestyle (5:03.4), finishing behind fellow American Chris von Saltza (4:55.9).

At the 1960 Summer Olympics in Rome, Italy, Ruuska swam for the gold medal-winning U.S. team in the preliminary heats of the women's 4×100-meter freestyle relay. Under the international swimming rules in effect in 1960, she did not receive a medal because she did not swim in the event final.

Ruuska was inducted into the International Swimming Hall of Fame in 1976.

== See also ==
- List of Olympic medalists in swimming (women)
- List of Stanford University people
- World record progression 200 metres individual medley
- World record progression 400 metres individual medley

Records
Preceded by Becky Collins	Women's 200-meter individual medley world record-holder (long course); August 16, 1958 – May 13, 1961	Succeeded by Donna de Varona
Preceded by Incumbent	Women's 400-meter individual medley world record-holder (long course); June 27, 1958 – July 15, 1960	Succeeded by Donna de Varona
