= Susan Roberts =

South African swimmer (born 1939)

Personal information
- Born: April 21, 1939 (age 87) Johannesburg, South Africa

Sport
- Sport: Swimming
Medal record
Representing South Africa
Olympic Games
Bronze medal – third place	1956 Melbourne	4x100 m freestyle relay

Susan Roberts (born 21 April 1939) is a South African former swimmer who competed in the 1956 Summer Olympics.
