= Great Britain at the 1952 Summer Olympics =

- Flag of the United Kingdom
- IOC code: GBR
- NOC: British Olympic Association

in Helsinki
- Competitors: 257 (213 men and 44 women) in 18 sports
- Flag bearer: Harold Whitlock
- Medals Ranked 18th: Gold 1 Silver 2 Bronze 8 Total 11

Summer Olympics appearances (overview)
- 1896; 1900; 1904; 1908; 1912; 1920; 1924; 1928; 1932; 1936; 1948; 1952; 1956; 1960; 1964; 1968; 1972; 1976; 1980; 1984; 1988; 1992; 1996; 2000; 2004; 2008; 2012; 2016; 2020; 2024; 2028

Other related appearances
- 1906 Intercalated Games

Great Britain, represented by the British Olympic Association (BOA), the previous host of the 1948 Summer Olympics in London, competed at the 1952 Summer Olympics in Helsinki, Finland. 257 competitors, 213 men and 44 women, took part in 127 events in 18 sports. In 1952, they achieved their only gold medal during the last event of the last day of competition in Helsinki. Along with 1904 and 1996, this is Great Britain's lowest gold medal count.

== Medallists ==
Medals by sport
Sport	Gold medal	Silver medal	Bronze medal	Total
Equestrian	1	0	0	1
Athletics	0	1	4	5
Sailing	0	1	0	1
Cycling	0	0	1	1
Swimming	0	0	1	1
Field hockey	0	0	1	1
Wrestling	0	0	1	1
Total	1	2	8	11

=== Gold ===
- Harry Llewellyn, Duggie Stewart, and Wilf White — Equestrian, Jumping Team Competition

=== Silver ===
- Sheila Lerwill — Athletics, Women's High Jump
- Charles Currey — Sailing, Men's Finn Individual Competition

=== Bronze ===
- McDonald Bailey — Athletics, Men's 100 metres
- John Disley — Athletics, Men's 3000m Steeplechase
- Heather Armitage, Sylvia Cheeseman, Jean Desforges, and June Foulds-Paul — Athletics, Women's 4 × 100 metres Relay
- Shirley Cawley — Athletics, Women's long jump
- Donald Burgess, George Newberry, Alan Newton, and Ronald Stretton — Cycling, Men's 4000m Team Pursuit
- Helen Gordon — Swimming, Women's 200m Breaststroke
- Kenneth Richmond — Wrestling, Men's Freestyle Heavyweight
- Denys Carnill, John Cockett, John Conroy, Graham Dadds, Derek Day, Dennis Eagan, Robin Fletcher, Roger Midgley, Richard Norris, Neil Nugent, Anthony Nunn, Anthony Robinson, and John Taylor — Field Hockey, Men's Team Competition

== Athletics ==
Men's 100 metres

- McDonald Bailey

- First Round — 10.4s
- First Round — 10.5s
- Semifinals — 10.5s
- Final — 10.4s (→ Bronze Medal)

Men's Hammer Throw

- Duncan Clark

- Qualifying Round — 50.69m
- Final Round — 51.07m (→ 18th place)

Women's discus throw

- Suzanne Allday

- Qualifying Round — 36.37 m
- Final — 37.96 m (→ 15th place)

== Boxing ==
Men's Flyweight:

- David Dower

1. First Round – Defeated Abdelamid Boutefnouchet of France (3–0)
2. Second Round – Defeated Leslie Donovan Perera Handunge of Ceylon (3–0)
3. Third Round – Lost to Anatoli Bulakov of Soviet Union (1–2)

Men's Bantamweight:

- Thomas Nicholls

1. First Round – Lost to Pentti Olavi Hämäläinen of Finland (0–3)

Men's Featherweight:

- Percival Lewis

1. First Round – Lost to Georghe Ilie of Romania (0–3)

Men's Lightweight:

- Frederick Reardon

1. First Round – Defeated Roger Cuche of Switzerland (KO 3R)
2. Second Round – Defeated Aleksandr Zasuhin of Soviet Union (0–3)
3. Third Round – Lost to Aleksy Antkiewicz of Poland (0–3)

Men's Light Welterweight:

- Peter Waterman

1. First Round – Defeated Oscar Juan Galardo of Argentina (2–1)
2. Second Round – Lost to Alexander Grant Webster of South Africa (0–3)

Men's Welterweight:

- John Maloney

1. First Round – Lost to Július Torma of Czechoslovakia (1–2)

Men's Light Middleweight:

- Bernard Foster

1. First Round – Lost to Petar Stankoff Spassoff of Bulgaria (1–2)

Men's Middleweight:

- Terence Gooding

1. First Round – Defeated Moustafa Mohamed Fahim of Egypt (2–1)
2. Second Round – Lost to Boris Georgiev Nikolov of Bulgaria (2–1)

Men's Light Heavyweight:

- Henry Cooper

1. Second Round – Lost to Anatoli Perov of Soviet Union (1–2)

Men's Heavyweight:

- Edgar Hearn

1. First Round – Defeated José Victorio Sartor of Argentina (2–1)
2. Third Round – Lost to Ilkka Rickhard Koski of Finland (0–3)

== Cycling ==
Road Competition

Men's Individual Road Race (190.4 km)

- Desmond Robinson — 5:18:08.9 (→ 26th place)
- Brian Robinson — 5:18:08.9 (→ 27th place)
- Graham Vines — 5:22:33.2 (→ 31st place)
- Leslie Ingman — did not finish (→ no ranking)

Track Competition

Men's 1.000m Time Trial

- Donald McKellow

- Final — 1:13.3 (→ 5th place)

Men's 1.000m Sprint Scratch Race

- Cyril Peacock — 4th place

Men's 4.000m Team Pursuit

- Alan Newton, Donald Burgess, George Newberry, and Ronald Stretton

- Bronze Medal Match — defeated France (→ Bronze Medal)

== Diving ==
Men

Athlete	Event	Preliminary		Final			
Athlete	Event	Points	Rank	Points	Rank	Total	Rank
Peter Elliott	3 m springboard	61.85	20	Did not advance			
Peter Heatly	3 m springboard	63.17	16	Did not advance			
Anthony Turner	3 m springboard	71.36	5 Q	80.54	7	151.90	7
Peter Heatly	10 m platform	67.78	12	Did not advance			
Anthony Turner	10 m platform	64.34	19	Did not advance			

Women

Athlete	Event	Preliminary		Final			
Athlete	Event	Points	Rank	Points	Rank	Total	Rank
Dorothy Drew	3 m springboard	51.28	11	Did not advance			
Ann Long	3 m springboard	54.82	6 Q	54.00	8	108.82	8
Charmain Welsh	3 m springboard	59.14	3 Q	57.24	6	116.38	5
Valerie Lloyd-Chandos	10 m platform	35.39	12	Did not advance			
Ann Long	10 m platform	43.23	6 Q	19.96	5	63.19	5
Diana Spencer	10 m platform	43.16	7 Q	17.60	7	60.76	7

== Fencing ==
17 fencers, 14 men and 3 women, represented Great Britain in 1952.

Men's foil

- René Paul
- Luke Wendon
- Raymond Paul

Men's team foil

- René Paul, Luke Wendon, Emrys Lloyd, Raymond Paul, Harry Cooke, Allan Jay

Men's épée

- Allan Jay
- Ronald Parfitt
- René Paul

Men's team épée

- René Paul, Allan Jay, Christopher Grose-Hodge, Ronald Parfitt, Raymond Harrison, Charles de Beaumont

Men's sabre

- William Beatley
- Bob Anderson
- Olgierd Porebski

Men's team sabre

- Roger Tredgold, Olgierd Porebski, Bob Anderson, William Beatley, Luke Wendon

Women's foil

- Mary Glen-Haig
- Gillian Sheen
- Patricia Buller

== Gymnastics ==
The British Gymnastics team competed in 15 events and was made up of 14 gymnasts, (6 men and 8 women), including Frank Turner and George Weedon, both of whom had competed in the 1948 Summer Olympics.

== Modern pentathlon ==
Three male pentathletes represented Great Britain in 1952.

Individual

- Leon Lumsdaine
- John Hewitt
- Jervis Percy

Team

- Leon Lumsdaine
- John Hewitt
- Jervis Percy

== Rowing ==
Great Britain had 23 male rowers participate in six out of seven rowing events in 1952.

Men's single sculls – Fourth

- Tony Fox

Men's double sculls

- John MacMillan (born 1932)
- Peter Brandt

Men's coxless pair – Fourth

- David Callender
- Christopher Davidge

Men's coxless four – Fourth

- Harry Almond
- John Jones
- James Crowden
- Adrian Cadbury

Men's coxed four – Fourth

- John MacMillan (born 1928)
- Graham Fisk
- Laurence Guest
- Peter de Giles
- Paul Massey (cox)

Men's eight – Fourth

- David Macklin
- Alastair MacLeod
- Nicholas Clack
- Roger Sharpley
- Edward Worlidge
- Brian Lloyd
- William Windham
- David Jennens
- John Hinde (cox)

== Shooting ==
Twelve shooters represented Great Britain in 1952.

25 m pistol

- Henry Steele
- Henry Swire

50 m pistol

- Ronald Guy
- William White

300 m rifle, three positions

- John Pearson
- Jocelyn Barlow

50 m rifle, three positions

- Steffen Cranmer
- Charles Hyde

50 m rifle, prone

- Charles Hyde
- Steffen Cranmer

100m running deer

- Cyril Mackworth-Praed
- Ingram Capper

Trap

- Enoch Jenkins
- Charles Lucas

== Swimming ==
Men

Ranks given are within the heat.

Athlete	Event	Heat		Swim-off		Semifinal		Final	
Athlete	Event	Time	Rank	Time	Rank	Time	Rank	Time	Rank
Ronald Roberts	100 m freestyle	59.5	1 Q	—N/a		59.5	7	Did not advance	
Jack Wardrop	100 m freestyle	58.9	1 Q	—N/a		59.4	6	Did not advance	
Thomas Welsh	100 m freestyle	59.5	2 Q	—N/a		1:00.3	7	Did not advance	
Ronald Burns	400 m freestyle	4:55.2	5	—N/a		Did not advance			
Peter Head	400 m freestyle	5:04.2	5	—N/a		Did not advance			
Jack Wardrop	400 m freestyle	4:43.7	1 Q	—N/a		4:41.1	3 Q	4:39.9	5
Bob Sreenan	1500 m freestyle	19:59.2	4	—N/a				Did not advance	
John Brockway	100 m backstroke	1:08.8	1 Q	—N/a		1:09.0	5	Did not advance	
Bert Wardrop	100 m backstroke	1:09.9	3 QSO	1:07.8	1 Q	1:08.6	4 Q	1:07.8	6
Brian Barnes	200 m breaststroke	2:48.6	5	—N/a		Did not advance			
Roy Botham; Ronald Burns; Thomas Welsh; Jack Wardrop	4 × 200 m freestyle	8:59.7	2 Q	—N/a				8:52.9	6

Women

Ranks given are within the heat.

Athlete	Event	Heat		Semifinal		Final	
Athlete	Event	Time	Rank	Time	Rank	Time	Rank
Angela Barnwell	100 m freestyle	1:07.6	3 Q	1:07.2	3 Q	1:08.6	8
Jean Botham	100 m freestyle	1:10.5	4	Did not advance			
Lillian Preece	100 m freestyle	1:10.0	4	Did not advance			
Lillian Preece	400 m freestyle	5:32.1	5	Did not advance			
Daphne Wilkinson	400 m freestyle	5:16.6	2 Q	5:27.2	5	Did not advance	
Grace Wood	400 m freestyle	5:31.2	4	Did not advance			
Margaret McDowall	100 m backstroke	1:17.5	3 Q	—N/a		1:18.4	7
Pauline Musgrave	100 m backstroke	1:19.6	3	—N/a		Did not advance	
Elenor Gordon	200 m breaststroke	2:58.6	1 Q	2:57.8	2	2:57.6	3rd place, bronze medalist(s)
Valerie Harris	200 m breaststroke	3:04.6	3	Did not advance			
Jean Wrigley	200 m breaststroke	3:04.5	3 Q	3:03.2	6	Did not advance	
Phyllis Linton; Jean Botham; Angela Barnwell; Lillian Preece	4 × 100 m freestyle	4:36.0	2 Q	—N/a		4:37.8	5
