= Aquatics at the 1954 British Empire and Commonwealth Games =

- Venue: Empire Pool
- Location: University of British Columbia, West Point Grey, Vancouver, Canada
- Dates: 30 July – 7 August 1954

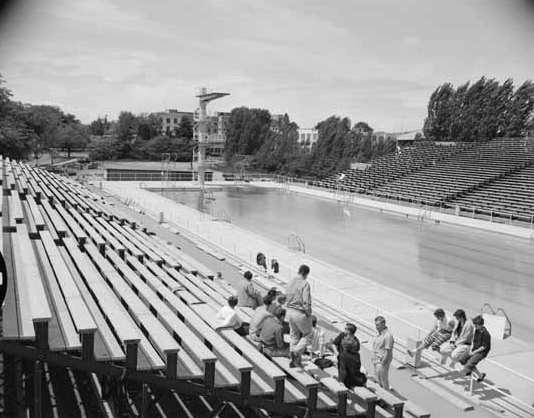
The Empire Pool on UBC's West Point Grey campus, Attribution:Province newspaper

Aquatics at the 1954 British Empire and Commonwealth Games made its fifth appearance at the Commonwealth Games, with both Swimming at the Commonwealth Games and Diving at the Commonwealth Games being included again. Water Polo at the Commonwealth Games was dropped from the schedule and would not return until 2002.

There were four diving events and 13 swimming events contested.

The choice of swimming venue suffered from budgeting issues and a bid by Los Angeles-based Paddock Inc. came in at $140,000 less than the Beaver Construction's tender of $440,719. There were suggestions to rebuild the 1928 Nicola Street Crystal Pool before the Games committee decided that the University of British Columbia (UBC) would benefit from a new $300,000 open air pool.

The pool was constructed on UBC's West Point Grey campus.

Australia topped the medal table with seven gold medals.

== Medal table ==
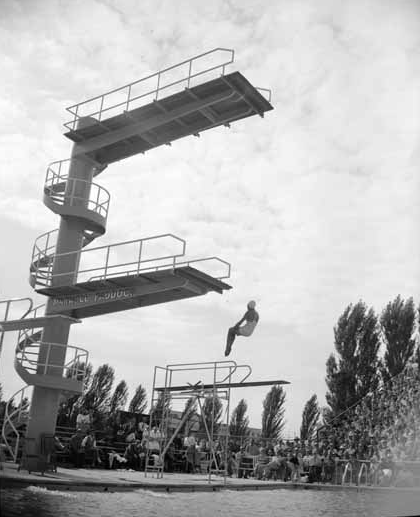
Diving at the Empire Pool. Attribution:Province newspaper

* Host nation (Canada)

Medals won by nation with totals, ranked by number of golds—sortable
| Rank | Nation | Gold | Silver | Bronze | Total |
|---|---|---|---|---|---|
| 1 | Australia | 7 | 3 | 4 | 14 |
| 2 | South Africa (SAF) | 3 | 3 | 3 | 9 |
| 3 | Scotland | 3 | 1 | 3 | 7 |
| 4 | England | 1 | 4 | 4 | 9 |
| 5 | Canada (CAN)* | 1 | 4 | 1 | 6 |
| 6 | New Zealand | 1 | 2 | 2 | 5 |
| 7 | Wales | 1 | 0 | 0 | 1 |
| 8 | Bermuda | 0 | 0 | 0 | 0 |
| 8 | Hong Kong | 0 | 0 | 0 | 0 |
| 8 | Jamaica | 0 | 0 | 0 | 0 |
| 8 | Northern Ireland | 0 | 0 | 0 | 0 |
| Totals (11 entries) | | 17 | 17 | 17 | 51 |

== Medal winners ==
=== Diving ===
| Event | Gold | Silver | Bronze |
|---|---|---|---|
| 3m Springboard (M) | Peter Heatly (SCO) | Tony Turner (ENG) | Jack Stewart (NZL) |
| 10m Highboard (M) | Bill Patrick (CAN) | Kevin James Newell (AUS) | Peter Heatly (SCO) |
| 3m Springboard (W) | Ann Long (ENG) | Barbara McAulay (AUS) | Irene MacDonald (CAN) |
| 10m Highboard (W) | Barbara McAulay (AUS) | Eunice Miller (ENG) | Ann Long (ENG) |

=== Swimming ===
Men's events

| Event | Gold | Silver | Bronze |
|---|---|---|---|
| 110 yd freestyle | Jon Henricks (AUS) | Cyrus Weld (AUS) | Rex Aubrey (AUS) |
| 440 yd freestyle | Gary Chapman (AUS) | Jack Wardrop (SCO) | Graham Johnston (SAF) |
| 1650 yd freestyle | Graham Johnston (SAF) | Peter Duncan (SAF) | Gary Chapman (AUS) |
| 110 yd backstroke | John Brockway (WAL) | Lincoln Hurring (NZL) | Cyrus Weld (AUS) |
| 220 yd breaststroke | Jack Doms (NZL) | Peter Jervis (ENG) | Alan Hime (ENG) |
| 4×220 yd freestyle relay | Australia; David Hawkins; Gary Chapman; Jon Henricks; Rex Aubrey | Canada; Allen Gilchrist; George Park; Gerald McNamee; Ted Simpson | South Africa; Dennis Ford; Graham Johnston; Peter Duncan; Billy Steuart |
| 3×110 yd medley relay | Australia; Cyrus Weld; David Hawkins; Jon Henricks | New Zealand; Frederick Lucas; Jack Doms; Lincoln Hurring | Scotland; Jack Wardrop; John Service; Robert Wardrop |

Women's events

| Event | Gold | Silver | Bronze |
|---|---|---|---|
| 110 yd freestyle | Lorraine Crapp (AUS) | Virginia Grant (CAN) | Joan Harrison (SAF) |
| 440 yd freestyle | Lorraine Crapp (AUS) | Gladys Priestley (CAN) | Margaret Girvan (SCO) |
| 110 yd backstroke | Joan Harrison (SAF) | Pat Symons (ENG) | Jean Stewart (NZL) |
| 220 yd breaststroke | Elenor Gordon (SCO) | Mary Morgan (SAF) | Margaret Grundy (ENG) |
| 4×110 yd freestyle relay | South Africa; Felicity Loveday; Joan Harrison; Machduldt Petzer; Natalie Myburgh | Canada; Beth Whittall; Gladys Priestley; Helen Stewart; Virginia Grant | England; Daphne Wilkinson; Fearne Ewart; Jean Botham; Valerie Nares-Pillow |
| 3×110 yd medley relay | Scotland; Helen Gordon; Margaret McDowell; Margaret Girvan | South Africa; Joan Harrison; Machduldt Petzer; Mary Morgan | Australia; Jann Grier; Judith Knight; Lorraine Crapp |

== Finals (men) ==
=== 3m springboard ===
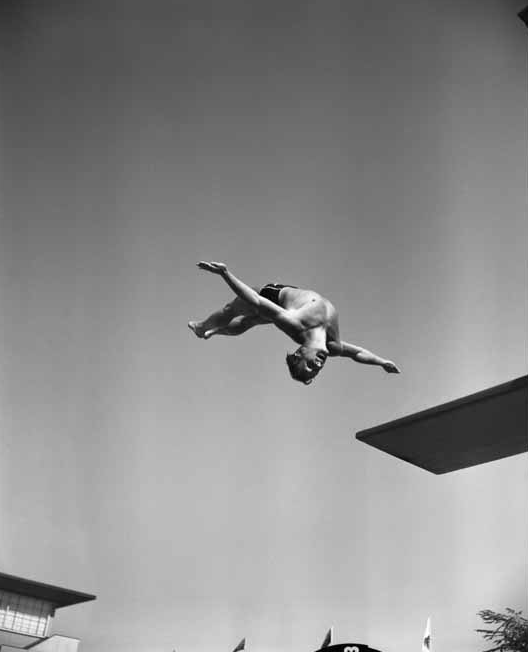
Jack Stewart of New Zealand winning a bronze medal Attribution:Province newspaper

| Pos | Athlete | Pts |
|---|---|---|
| 1 | (Scotland) Peter Heatly | 146.76 |
| 2 | (England) Tony Turner | 145.27 |
| 3 | (New Zealand) Jack Stewart | 144.98 |
| 4 | (Australia) Kevin James Newell | 141.04 |
| 5 | (Canada) Bernard D. Valois | 137.97 |
| 6 | (Canada) Bill Patrick | 135.48 |
| 7 | (England) Frank Mercer | 124.74 |

=== 10m Platform ===
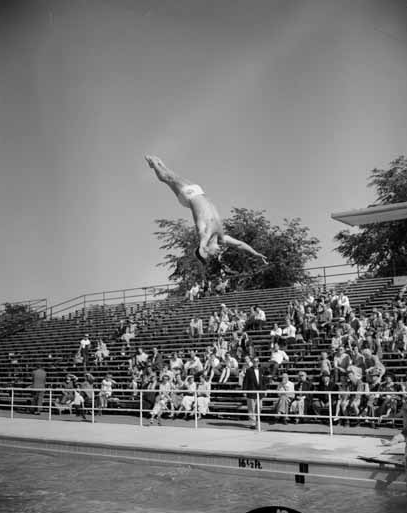
Bill Patrick of Canada winning gold. Attribution:Province newspaper

| Pos | Athlete | Pts |
|---|---|---|
| 1 | (Canada) Bill Patrick | 142.7 |
| 2 | (Australia) Kevin James Newell | 142.06 |
| 3 | (Scotland) Peter Heatly | 141.32 |
| 4 | (England) Peter Tarsey | 140.56 |
| 5 | (England) Tony Turner | 138.31 |
| 6 | (Canada) Terrence Connelly | 110.78 |

=== 110y freestyle ===
| Pos | Athlete | Time |
|---|---|---|
| 1 | (Australia) Jon Henricks | 56.5 |
| 2 | (Australia) Cyrus Weld | 58.5 |
| 3 | (Australia) Rex Aubrey | 58.7 |
| 4 | (Canada) George Park | 59.1 |
| 5 | (Hong Kong) Cheung Kin Man | 59.9 |
| 6 | (Jamaica) Barrington Roper | 1:00.2 |

=== 440y freestyle ===
| Pos | Athlete | Time |
|---|---|---|
| 1 | (Australia) Gary Chapman | 4:39.8 |
| 2 | (Scotland) Jack Wardrop | 4:41.5 |
| 3 | (South Africa) Graham Johnston | 4:43.3 |
| 4 | (South Africa) Peter Duncan | 4:48.6 |
| 5 | (Canada) Gerald McNamee | 4:51.6 |
| 6 | (South Africa) Billy Steuart | 4:52.1 |

=== 1650y freestyle ===
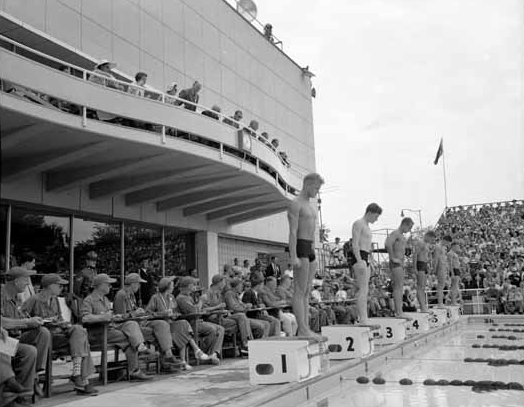
Start of a swimming event. Attribution:Province newspaper

| Pos | Athlete | Time |
|---|---|---|
| 1 | (South Africa) Graham Johnston | 19:01.4 |
| 2 | (South Africa) Peter Duncan | 19:22.1 |
| 3 | (Australia) Gary Chapman | 19:28.4 |
| 4 | (South Africa) Billy Steuart | 19:28.6 |
| 5 | (England) Donald Bland | 20:02.7 |
| 6 | (Canada) Gerald McNamee | 20:07.9 |

=== 110y backstroke ===
| Pos | Athlete | Time |
|---|---|---|
| 1 | (Wales) John Brockway | 1:06.5 |
| 2 | (New Zealand) Lincoln Hurring | 1:06.9 |
| 3 | (Australia) Cyrus Weld | 1:08.6 |
| 4 | (South Africa) Lin Meiring | 1:09.2 |
| 5 | (Scotland) Bert Wardrop | 1:09.9 |
| 6 | (England) Haydn Rigby | 1:10.7 |

=== 220y breaststroke ===
| Pos | Athlete | Time |
|---|---|---|
| 1 | (New Zealand) Jack Doms | 2:52.6 |
| 2 | (England) Peter Jervis | 2:52.6 |
| 3 | (England) Alan Hime | 2:52.8 |
| 4 | (Australia) David Hawkins | 2:53.3 |
| 5 | (Scotland) John Service | 2:53.9 |
| 6 | (Canada) Robert Gair | 2:56.0 |

=== 4x220y freestyle relay ===
| Pos | Athlete | Time |
|---|---|---|
| 1 | (Australia) Hawkins, Chapman, Henricks, Aubrey | 8:47.6 |
| 2 | (Canada) Gilchrist, Park, McNamee, Simpson | 8:56.0 |
| 3 | (South Africa) Ford, Johnston, Duncan, Steuart | 8:56.3 |
| 4 | (England) Bland, Rigby, Roberts, Jervis | 9:17.6 |

=== 3x110y medley relay ===
| Pos | Athlete | Time |
|---|---|---|
| 1 | (Australia) Weld, Hawkins, Henricks | 3:22.0 |
| 2 | (New Zealand) Lucas, Doms, Hurring | 3:26.6 |
| 3 | (Scotland) Wardrop J, Service, Wardrop R | 3:27.3 |
| 4 | (England) Rigby, Roberts, Jervis | 3:27.8 |
| 5 | (Canada) Park, Anderson, Simpson | 3:28.3 |
| 6 | (Northern Ireland) Devlin, Fletcher, Laverty | 3:45.2 |

== Finals (women) ==
=== 3m springboard ===
| Pos | Athlete | Pts |
|---|---|---|
| 1 | (England) Ann Long | 128.26 |
| 2 | (Australia) Barbara McAulay | 127.74 |
| 3 | (Canada) Irene MacDonald | 126.19 |
| 4 | (England) Charmain Welsh | 121.54 |
| 5 | (New Zealand) Jeannette Laws | 104.26 |
| 6 | (Canada) Lois Wood | 89.64 |

=== 10m Platform ===
| Pos | Athlete | Pts |
|---|---|---|
| 1 | (Australia) Barbara McAulay | 86.55 |
| 2 | (England) Eunice Miller | 79.86 |
| 3 | (England) Ann Long | 79.53 |
| 4 | (New Zealand) Jeannette Laws | 61.34 |
| 5 | (Canada) Lois Wood | 55.16 |

=== 110y freestyle ===
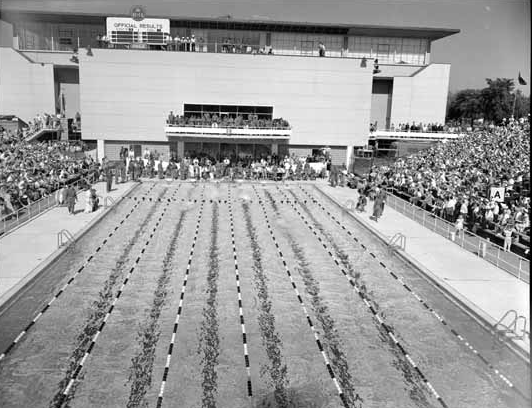
Empire Pool, Vancouver. Attribution:Province newspaper

| Pos | Athlete | Time |
|---|---|---|
| 1 | (Australia) Lorraine Crapp | 1:05.8 |
| 2 | (Canada) Virginia Grant | 1:06.3 |
| 3 | (South Africa) Joan Harrison | 1:08.2 |
| 4 | (New Zealand) Marrion Roe | 1:08.9 |
| 5 | (South Africa) Machduldt Petzer | 1:09.0 |
| 6 | (South Africa) Natalie Myburgh | 1:09.4 |

=== 440y freestyle ===
| Pos | Athlete | Time |
|---|---|---|
| 1 | (Australia) Lorraine Crapp | 5:11.4 |
| 2 | (Canada) Gladys Priestley | 5:19.6 |
| 3 | (Scotland) Margaret Girvan | 5:21.4 |
| 4 | (South Africa) Machduldt Petzer | 5:21.5 |
| 5 | (South Africa) Natalie Myburgh | 5:23.0 |
| 6 | (Canada) Beth Whittall | 5:27.3 |

=== 110y backstroke ===
| Pos | Athlete | Time |
|---|---|---|
| 1 | (South Africa) Joan Harrison | 1:15.2 |
| 2 | (England) Pat Symons | 1:17.4 |
| 3 | (New Zealand) Jean Stewart | 1:17.5 |
| 4 | (Canada) Lenora Fisher | 1:18.2 |
| 5 | (Scotland) Margaret McDowall | 1:18.8 |
| 6 | (England) Maureen Pitchfork | 1:19.0 |

=== 220y breaststroke ===
| Pos | Athlete | Time |
|---|---|---|
| 1 | (Scotland) Elenor Gordon | 2:59.2 |
| 2 | (South Africa) Mary Morgan | 3:03.3 |
| 3 | (England) Margaret Grundy | 3:04.5 |
| 4 | (Australia) Jann Grier | 3:13.4 |
| 5 | (Canada) Margaret Stangroom | 3:18.0 |
| 6 | (Canada) Margaret Peebles | 3:20.5 |

=== 4×110y freestyle relay ===
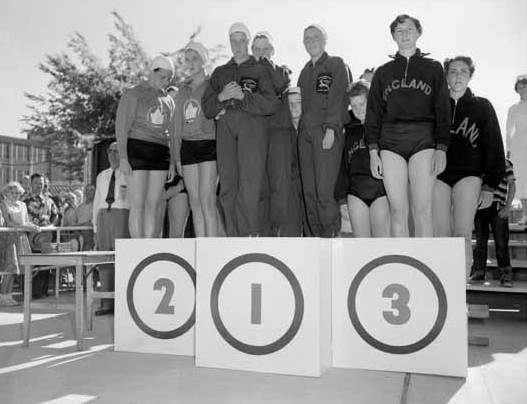
The medal ceremony for the 4×110 yd freestyle relay Attribution:Province newspaper

| Pos | Athlete | Time |
|---|---|---|
| 1 | (South Africa) Loveday, Harrison, Petzer, Myburgh | 4:33.9 |
| 2 | (Canada) Whittall, Priestley, Stewart, Grant | 4:37.0 |
| 3 | (England) Wilkinson, Ewart, Botham, Nares-Pillow | 4:41.8 |

=== 3×110y medley relay ===
| Pos | Athlete | Time |
|---|---|---|
| 1 | (Scotland) Gordon, McDowell, Girvan | 3:51.0 |
| 2 | (South Africa) Harrison, Petzer, Morgan | 3:52.7 |
| 3 | (Australia) Grier, Knight, Crapp | 3:55.6 |
| 4 | (England) Botham, Grundy, Pitchfork | 3:56.4 |
| 5 | (Canada) Fisher, Stangroom, Grant | 3:57.5 |
