= Vivienne Meyrick =

English swimmer

Personal information
- Nationality: British, English
- Born: Third quarter 1937 Orsett, Essex, England

Sport
- Sport: Swimming
- Event: Backstroke
- Club: Ilford SC; Saffron Walden SC

Vivienne G Meyrick (born 1937), is a female former swimmer who competed for England.

== Biography ==
Meyrick represented the English team at the 1954 British Empire and Commonwealth Games held in Vancouver, Canada, where she participated in the 110y backstroke event.

She was a member of the Saffron Walden Swimming Club and has a trophy named after her.

She married John Crowe in 1965 and was known afterwards as Vivienne Crowe.
