= Peter Jervis =

English swimmer

Personal information
- Nationality: British (English)
- Born: 1931
- Died: 29 June 2015 (aged 83)

Sport
- Sport: Swimming
- Event: Breaststroke / medley
- Club: Retford
Medal record
Swimming
Representing England
British Empire & Commonwealth Games
Silver medal – second place	1954 Vancouver	220 y breaststroke

Peter Jervis (1931 – 29 June 2015), was a male swimmer who competed for England.

== Biography ==
Jervis represented the English team at the 1954 British Empire and Commonwealth Games held in Vancouver, Canada, where he won the silver medal in the 220 yd breaststroke event. It took the seven judges 18 minutes to determine that Jack Doms had touched home first to deny Jervis the gold.

Jervis joined the Retford Swimming Club and won four ASA National British Championships, over 220 yards breaststroke in 1950, 1952, 1953 and 1954 and held four British records. After retiring from national competition he competed in masters competitions.

== Personal life ==
In 1989 he was diagnosed with Cardiomyopathy and underwent a heart transplant in 1995. He was a qualified electrician.
