= Gus Stager =

American swimmer and coach (1923–2019)

- Stager as Michigan swimmer, 1948

Biographical details
- Born: February 18, 1923; Newark, New Jersey
- Died: July 6, 2019 (aged 96); Port Townsend, Washington
- Education: University of Michigan; 3 x All American; 1947-50

Playing career
- 1941-1946: Newark Academy; Newark Athletic Club; U.S. Army Swim Team
- 1947-1951: University of Michigan; Middle distance freestyle

Coaching career (HC unless noted)
- 1952-1954: Fordson High School; Dearborn, Michigan
- 1955-1979 1981-1982: University of Michigan

Head coaching record
- Overall: 169-39-1.80 Win Pct. (University of Michigan)

Accomplishments and honors

Championships
- 4 NCAA Championships '57 '58 '59 '61; 3 Big 10 Titles; 20 Big 10 2nd place finishes (University of Michigan) 3 Class A state championships 52-54; 1 National Championship; Fordson High School (Dearborn, Michigan)

Awards
- 1979 Collegiate Interschol. Trophy; 1982 International Swim. Hall of Fame; 1982 U. of Michigan Hall of Honor

Augustus Pingree "Gus" Stager Jr. (February 18, 1923 – July 6, 2019) was an All American competitive swimmer for the University of Michigan. As a Hall of Fame swimming coach, he was best known for leading the University of Michigan swimming team to four NCAA championships in his twenty-five year tenure (1955–1979, 1981–1982). In his early coaching career, he had the distinction of being selected to lead the 1960 U.S. Rome Olympic swimming team.

== Early life ==
Stager was born in Nutley, New Jersey, just North of Newark. He served in the United States Army during World War II from roughly 1943–1946, while swimming for the Army teams and completing two tours. He was stationed and did swim training in the Philippines, and competed in Honolulu, Hawaii in early 1946.

== High School, AAU, and army swimming ==
=== 100-yard New Jersey state titlist ===
While an athlete at Newark Academy, swimming for the Newark Athletic Club on March 26, 1941, Stager placed a close second in the 100-yard Junior AAU Championship. In March 1943, likely after High School graduation, Stager won first place in the 100-yard freestyle, swimming for the Newark Athletic Club at the AAU New Jersey State Championships in Newark, New Jersey.

=== 220-yard New Jersey state titlist ===
By 1943, Stager was a two-time state champion in the 220-yard freestyle state title, while swimming for the Newark Parks Department at the State Championship Senior AAU meet in Bridgewater, New Jersey. He first took the 220-yard AAU State title in 1942 at the Seton Hall Pool in South, Orange, New Jersey, where he finished six yards ahead of the former State champion, a Junior college swimmer from Rutgers. By 1945, Stager was an American Athletic Union New Jersey State Champion in both the 100 and 220-yard freestyle events. As an Army and Collegiate athlete, Stager would specialize in longer freestyle events.

=== National Prep School competition ===
Fairing somewhat less well in National competition, in the National Preparatory Swimming School Championships in Mid-March 1942, while swimming for Newark Academy, Stager placed second in the 220-yard freestyle, and fifth in the 100-yard freestyle with a 52.8.

At Newark Academy in Newark, New Jersey, he was a leading swimmer and also played football, and was considered for the Newark Athletic Club trophy in January 1943.

=== Army swimming competitions ===
Having joined the U.S. Army by 1944, he competed with the Army team from the Philippines, where he was stationed, and won the 400-meter free-style event at the "Pacific Army Olympics" held in Manila, Philippines in December 1945 with a time of 5:31. He competed again for the Army's Philippine contingent as part of the Pacific Army Olympics under better conditions at the Richardson Pool before a crowd of 4,000 civilians and servicemen at the Schofield Barracks in Honolulu Hawaii, in late January 1946, where he again won the 400-meter freestyle.

According to one source, Stager had completed his army service by mid-March 1946, and was back in Orange, New Jersey competing in AAU competition for the New Jersey State Championship for the 100-yard freestyle event, where he finished second by only a fraction of an inch behind the first-place finisher with a time of 55.55.

=== Swimming for Michigan, 1947-51 ===
Stager enrolled at the University of Michigan after being discharged from the Army around the Spring of 1946, and set a freshman American record in the 200-yard free style in February 1947 with a time of 2:12.3. Stager specialized in the middle-distance events, the 220, and 440, but also swam the 1500-meter event. He went on to become a three-time NCAA finalist, and named to the coaches' All-American team every year he swam for the Wolverines. As a highpoint of his college career, in 1948 he swam for the Michigan team that won the NCAA swimming championship and had the distinction of being the highest point scorer of the meet. That year the team also won the Big 10 Conference.

== Swimming coach at Fordson High ==
After graduating from Michigan, Stager taught math and became the swimming coach at Fordson High School known as Dearborn Fordson, in Dearborn, Michigan. As Forson swim coach, he led his team to three straight Class A state championships (1952, 1953, and 1954) and one national championship.

In February 1954, Stager submitted two performances by his swimmers at Dearborn High as National records, a 23.2 in the 50-yard freestyle by Ken Gest and a 1:19.3 in the 150-yard medley relay, a relay event also swum by Gest, though it is an event no longer swum in High School competition.

== Coaching at University of Michigan ==
In April 1954, he was named as Michigan's swimming coach when Hall of Fame Coach Matthew Mann retired after 31 years. Stager was hired by athletic director Fritz Crisler, and remained Michigan's swimming coach for 25 years until 1979. He achieved a career record of 169-39-1 as Michigan's head coach, and his Michigan swimming teams finished first or second in the Big Ten Conference 23 times.

Most significantly, Stager led Michigan to four NCAA national championships in 1957, 1958, 1959, and 1961. After the 1957 team won the NCAA team championship at Chapel Hill, North Carolina, an AP wirephoto of a fully clothed Stager being thrown into the pool by his Michigan team appeared in newspapers across the country. Stager's 1959 Wolverines' team was considered one of the strongest in NCAA history, as they scored an NCAA meet record 137½ points (41 points higher than the prior meet record set by Yale in 1954) -- more than the combined total of the second, third and fourth place teams.

As coach at Michigan in the 1950s, Stager had conflict with Scottish swimmers Jack and Bert Wardrop. After being suspended by Stager for insubordination, the two quit the team despite having eligibility remaining. Speaking later of the conflict, Stager said: "A foreign boy just doesn't have the team loyalty that an American boy has. The foreign boys can't conceive, for example, that they should swim out of their stroke (a free-styler competing in the breast-stroke, for instance) so that the team will get points. We train our boys to play for the team and not themselves from the time they step on the playground. We do our best to instill team spirit in them from the start. In most cases, the foreign students think it's just a lot of junk. Most of them don't give a damn. They're opportunists. This doesn't go for all foreign athletes, but most of them are interested only in personal achievement. . . . I don't think there's another country in the world like the United States, where boys will sacrifice almost anything to see their team win."

In 1981, Stager came out of retirement to coach the Wolverines from 1981 to 1982, replacing Bill Farley as coach.

=== Stager's outstanding swimmers ===
Stager's best-known swimmers included the Olympians Carl Robie, Dave Gillanders, Dick Hanley, Bill Farley, Jack and Bert Wardrop and Juan Carlos Bello. Tony Tashnik, a high point NCAA winner, was at the top of the national champions he coached which included Fritz Myers, Cy Hopkins, Breezy Nelson, Ron Clark, Frank Legacki, and others.

== International competition coach ==
Stager coached the U.S. swim team at the 1967 Pan American Games and the 1973 World Championship where the U.S. took first place.

== 1960 swimming coach for U.S. team ==
After leading Michigan to three straight NCAA championships, in a rare distinction, Stager was named as the youngest head coach ever to lead the 1960 U.S. Olympic swimming team. In 1956, the Australian team took nine gold medals, and the Americans only two. At the 1960 games, the Australian team was favored again, but the US team led by Stager took nine gold medals and fifteen total medals, topping the Australians' five gold and 13 total medals. In the 1960 games, Stager coached Joan Spillane to the first gold medal win by a U-M woman. Stager is credited with leading the U.S. team to victory as their coach in the first Aquatics World Championships at Belgrade, Serbia, Yugoslavia in early September 1973, where the U.S. team took 38 medals to East Germany's 28.

=== Honors and legacy ===
In 1982, he was inducted into both the International Swimming Hall of Fame and the University of Michigan Athletic Hall of Honor.

Stager is credited with focusing on certain swimming innovations such as shaving a swimmer's legs before a major competition to reduce resistance and increase speed, though the benefit may also be psychological. He also focused on interval training and carefully pre-planned workouts. He pioneered the no-touch turn which permitted only a foot rather than a hand to touch a timing device during a flip-turn, currently allowed in freestyle and backstroke turns only. Breaststroke and butterfly require both hands to touch prior to turning.

Stager died in Port Townsend, Washington where he moved to be near his daughter after the death of this wife Marion. After his passing on July 6, 2019, he had a Celebration of Life ceremony at the University of Michigan League Ballroom, attended by many of his former swimmers. While a student at the University of Michigan, he was married on August 22, 1948, to Marion Curtis Stager, who survived him, and the couple had two children. Formerly, he had resided in Ann Arbor, Michigan while coaching at the university.

== University of Michigan career coaching record ==
Season	Coach	Overall	Pct	Conference	Pct	Big Ten	National
1955-56	Gus Stager	1-4-1	.250	1-4	.200	2nd (56)	11th (10.5)
1956-57	Gus Stager	7-0	1.000	4-0	1.000	2nd (79)	1st (69)
1957-58	Gus Stager	8-0	1.000	6-0	1.000	1st (112)	1st (72)
1958-59	Gus Stager	10-0	1.000	7-0	1.000	1st (148)	1st (137.5)
1959-60	Gus Stager	7-1	.875	5-1	.833	1st (155)	2nd (73)
1960-61	Gus Stager	5-2	.714	5-1	.833	2nd (201.8)	1st (85)
1961-62	Gus Stager	5-2	.714	4-2	.667	3rd (146)	4th (32)
1962-63	Gus Stager	5-2	.714	4-2	.667	2nd (147.5)	3rd (52)
1963-64	Gus Stager	7-3	.700	4-3	.571	2nd (171.8)	4th (30)
1964-65	Gus Stager	7-0	1.000	6-0	1.000	2nd (409)	3rd (221)
1965-66	Gus Stager	8-1	.889	8-1	.889	2nd (406.5)	3rd (253)
1966-67	Gus Stager	4-3	.571	4-3	.571	2nd (396)	4th (184)
1967-68	Gus Stager	5-2	.714	4-2	.667	2nd (339)	6th (92)
1968-69	Gus Stager	7-3	.700	6-2	.750	2nd (414)	4th (165)
1969-70	Gus Stager	10-1	.909	6-1	.857	2nd (363)	6th (118)
1970-71	Gus Stager	10-1	.909	6-1	.857	2nd (325)	10th (69)
1971-72	Gus Stager	8-2	.800	6-1	.857	2nd (317)	10th (47)
1972-73	Gus Stager	8-1	.889	5-1	.833	2nd (386)	7th (88)
1973-74	Gus Stager	8-3	.727	6-2	.750	3rd (472)	15th (26)
1974-75	Gus Stager	8-2	.800	5-2	.714	3rd (278)	11th (44)
1975-76	Gus Stager	11-2	.846	6-1	.857	3rd (450)	13th (42)
1976-77	Gus Stager	7-1	.875	4-1	.800	4th (406.5)	13th (30)
1977-78	Gus Stager	5-2	.714	2-2	.500	4th (372)	16th (26)
1978-79	Gus Stager	13-1	.929	7-0	1.000	2nd (505)	10th (61)
1981-82	Gus Stager	5-1	.833	3-1	.750	3rd (471)	15th (41)

== See also ==
- List of members of the International Swimming Hall of Fame
- University of Michigan Athletic Hall of Honor
- Swimming at the 1960 Summer Olympics
