= Empire Pool =

Empire Pool may refer to:

- Empire Pool, the original name for Wembley Arena at Wembley Park in the London Borough of Brent
- Empire Pool, Vancouver, a swimming pool built for the 1954 British Empire and Commonwealth Games
- Wales Empire Pool, an international swimming pool in Cardiff (demolished 1998)
