= Swimming at the 1959 Pan American Games – Men's 200 metre butterfly =

Men's 200 metre butterfly at the I959 Pan American Games
- Venue: -
- Dates: September 3 (preliminaries), September 4 (finals)

Medalists
Gold medal	Dave Gillanders	United States
Silver medal	Michael Troy	United States
Bronze medal	Eulalio Ríos	Mexico

The men's 200 metre butterfly competition of the swimming events at the 1959 Pan American Games took place on 3 September (preliminaries) and 4 September (finals). The last Pan American Games champion was Eulalio Ríos of Mexico.

This race consisted of four lengths of the pool, all lengths being in butterfly stroke.

== Results ==
All times are in minutes and seconds.

KEY:	q	Fastest non-qualifiers	Q	Qualified	GR	Games record	NR	National record	PB	Personal best	SB	Seasonal best

=== Heats ===
The first round was held on September 3.

Rank	Heat	Name	Nationality	Time	Notes
1	2	Dave Gillanders	United States	2:20.2	Q, GR
2	1	Michael Troy	United States	2:20.5	Q
3	3	Tony Tashnick	United States	2:22.0	Q
4	1	Eulalio Ríos	Mexico	2:22.5	Q
5	2	Fernando Fanjul	Argentina	2:26.4	Q
6	1	Peter Fowler	Canada	2:38.8	Q
7	2	Heriberto Alvarado	Chile	2:41.3	Q
8	2	Ernesto Muñoz	Mexico	2:41.6	Q
-	3	Moacir dos Santos	Brazil	2:49.8	

=== Final ===
The final was held on September 4.

Rank	Name	Nationality	Time	Notes
1st place, gold medalist(s)	Dave Gillanders	United States	2:18.0	GR
2nd place, silver medalist(s)	Michael Troy	United States	2:18.3	
3rd place, bronze medalist(s)	Eulalio Ríos	Mexico	2:22.5	
4	Tony Tashnick	United States	2:22.8	
5	Fernando Fanjul	Argentina	2:29.3	
6	Ernesto Muñoz	Mexico	2:39.5	
7	-	-	-	
8	-	-	-	
