= Margaret Grundy =

English swimmer (born 1938)

Personal information
- Nationality: British (English)
- Born: 1938 (age 87–88)

Sport
- Sport: Swimming
- Event: Breastroke / medley
- Club: Blackpool
Medal record
Swimming
Representing England
British Empire & Commonwealth Games
Bronze medal – third place	1954 Vancouver	220 y breaststroke

Margaret Grundy (born 1938), is a female former swimmer who competed for England.

== Biography ==
Grundy represented the English team at the 1954 British Empire and Commonwealth Games held in Vancouver, Canada, where she won the bronze medal in the 220 yd breaststroke event.

At the ASA National British Championships she won the 220 yards breaststroke title in 1943 and 1954.

She was coached by Lucy Morton.
