= Derek Laverty =

Northern Irish swimmer

Personal information
- Nationality: British (Northern Irish)
- Born: 6 May 1931 Belfast, Northern Ireland
- Died: 3 October 2004 (aged 73) Vancouver, Canada

Sport
- Sport: Swimming
- Event: Freestyle
- Club: Wellington SC, Belfast; Ocean Falls SC

George Derek Laverty (6 May 1931 – 3 October 2004 ) was a swimmer from Northern Ireland, who represented Northern Ireland at the British Empire Games (now Commonwealth Games).

== Biography ==
Laverty was a member of the Wellington Swimming Club of Belfast and in 1951 was runner-up in the Irish 1500 metres championships.

He also competed in water polo and in March 1952 emigrated to Canada. Specialising in the Freestyle he joined the Ocean Falls SC in British Columbia and later broke the quarter-mile Canadian record in July 1954.

He represented the 1954 Northern Irish Team at the 1954 British Empire and Commonwealth Games in Vancouver, Canada, participating in the 440 yards freestyle event and the 1650 yards freestyle event

After the games the Northern Ireland team were given a civic reception by the Lord and Mayor and Lady Mayoress at the Belfast City Hall but Laverty was unable attend due to being based in Canada. He married Mary Hunter in Vancouver on 25 October 1957.
