= Eunice Millar =

English diver 1927–1992

Personal information
- Nationality: British (English)
- Born: 24 December 1927 West Ham, England
- Died: 1992 (aged 64–65) Gainsborough, England

Sport
- Sport: Diving
- Event: Platform
- Club: Bourne & Hollingworth
Medal record
Diving
Representing England
British Empire & Commonwealth Games
Silver medal – second place	1954 Vancouver	10m platform

Eunice Evelyn Millar (24 December 1927 – 1992) was a diver who competed for England.

== Biography ==
Millar represented the English team at the 1954 British Empire and Commonwealth Games held in Vancouver, Canada, where she won the silver medal in the 10 metres highboard platform event.

Millar married Joseph (or Giuseppi) M. Grassi in 1961 She died in 1992 in Gainsborough. and was a diving coach in the 1970s.
