= Pitchfork (disambiguation) =

A pitchfork an agricultural tool with a long handle used to lift and throw loose material.

Pitchfork may also refer to:

- Pitchfork (album), by Clutch, 1991
- Pitchfork (band), an American post-hardcore band
- Pitchfork (film), a 2016 horror film
- Pitchfork (website), an American online music publication
  - Pitchfork Music Festival, an annual event
- Colin Pitchfork (born 1960), a British convicted murderer and rapist
- Maureen Pitchfork (born 1934), an English swimmer

== See also ==
- Project Pitchfork, a German electronic musical group
- Pitchfork bifurcation, in mathematics
