= John Service (swimmer) =

British swimmer

Personal information
- Nationality: British (Scottish)
- Born: 4 December 1930 Scotland
- Died: 28 August 1996 (aged 65) Delta, British Columbia, Canada

Sport
- Sport: Swimming
- Strokes: Breaststroke
- Club: Western B.C
Medal record
Representing Scotland
British Empire and Commonwealth Games
| Bronze medal – third place | 1954 Vancouver | 3x110yd medley relay |

John Burgess Service (4 December 1930 – 28 August 1996) was a British swimmer who competed at the 1948 Summer Olympics.

== Biography ==
At the 1948 Olympic Games in London, Service competed in the men's 200 metre breaststroke.

He represented the Scottish team at the 1954 British Empire and Commonwealth Games in Vancouver, Canada, where he participated in the 220y breaststroke and medley relay events. He won the bronze medal in the medley relay.
