= Frank Mercer (diver) =

English diver (born 1928)

Personal information
- Nationality: British (English)
- Born: 1928 Bickley, England

Sport
- Sport: Diving
- Event: Springboard
- Club: Highgate

Frank Mercer (born 1928) is an English former diver.

== Biography ==
Mercer represented the English team at the 1954 British Empire and Commonwealth Games held in Vancouver, Canada, where he participated in the 3m Springboard diving event.

Mercer opened a dance school called the Bickley School of Dance, in St Augustines Avenue, Bickley in 1975 and the school has produced some of the world's leading ballroom dancers.
