= Billy Steuart =

South African swimmer (1936–2022)

Personal information
- Full name: William Steuart
- Nationality: South African
- Born: 28 August 1936 Johannesburg, South Africa
- Died: 12 April 2022 (aged 85) Davis, California, US

Sport
- Sport: Swimming
- Strokes: Freestyle
- College team: Michigan State University
Medal record
Representing Michigan State
NCAA
Gold medal – first place	1958 Ann Arbor	440 yard freestyle
Gold medal – first place	1958 Ann Arbor	1,500 meter freestyle
Gold medal – first place	1959 Ithaca	440 yard freestyle
Gold medal – first place	1959 Ithaca	1,500 meter freestyle

Billy Steuart (August 28, 1936 – April 12, 2022) was a South African swimmer. He competed in three events at the 1956 Summer Olympics. He finished third in the 4 x 220 yards freestyle relay (with Dennis Ford, Graham Johnston, and Peter Duncan), fourth in the 1650 yards freestyle and sixth in the 440 yards freestyle at the 1954 British Empire and Commonwealth Games.
