= Peter Head (swimmer) =

British swimmer

Personal information
- Nationality: British (English)
- Born: 18 February 1935 Essex, England
- Died: 11 June 2019 (aged 84) Norfolk, England

Sport
- Sport: Swimming
- Strokes: freestyle
- Club: Ilford

Peter Michael Head (18 February 1935 – 11 June 2019) was a British swimmer who competed at the 1952 Summer Olympics.

== Biography ==
At the 1952 Olympic Games in Helsinki, Head competed in the men's 400 metre freestyle.

He represented the English team at the 1954 British Empire and Commonwealth Games held in Vancouver, Canada, where he participated in the freestyle events.

He also represented his country at the European Championships and his most successful performance in professional swimming came in Paris 1957, where he came second in both the 100m and 400m freestyle at the World University Games. In January 2016, Head was interviewed in the Swimming Times and appeared on the front page.
