= Fearne Ewart =

British swimmer (born 1936)

Personal information
- Nationality: British (English)
- Born: 20 November 1936 (age 89) Puttalam, British Ceylon

Sport
- Sport: Swimming
- Strokes: Freestyle
- Club: Hastings SC
Medal record
Swimming
Representing England
British Empire & Commonwealth Games
Bronze medal – third place	1954 Vancouver	440 y freestyle relay

Fearne Ewart (born 20 November 1936) is a British former swimmer. She competed in two events at the 1956 Summer Olympics.

== Biography ==
Ewart represented the English team at the 1954 British Empire and Commonwealth Games held in Vancouver, Canada, where she won the bronze medal in the 4×110 yd freestyle relay event.

She won the 1955 ASA National Championship 100 metres freestyle title.

At the 1956 Olympic Games in Melbourne, Ewart participated in the 100 metres freestyle and 4 × 100 metres freestyle relay.
