= Alan Hime =

English swimmer

Personal information
- Nationality: British (English)
- Born: 24 June 1929 St Pancras, London, England
- Died: 2 November 1985 (aged 56) Finchley, London, England

Sport
- Sport: Swimming
- Event: breaststroke
- Club: Stoke Newington
Medal record
Swimming
Representing England
British Empire & Commonwealth Games
Bronze medal – third place	1954 Vancouver	220 y breaststroke

Alan Walter Hime (24 June 1929 – 2 November 1985), was a male swimmer who competed for England.

== Biography ==
Hime represented the English team at the 1954 British Empire and Commonwealth Games held in Vancouver, Canada, where he won the bronze medal in the 220y breaststroke event.

After he retired from competitive swimming he became a Great Britain swimming team manager.
