= Pat Symons =

English swimmer (1935–1987)

Personal information
- Nationality: British (English)
- Born: 12 January 1935 Newcastle, England
- Died: 1987 (aged 52) Gateshead, England

Sport
- Sport: Swimming
- Event: Backstroke
- Club: Northumberland ASC
Medal record
Swimming
Representing England
British Empire & Commonwealth Games
Silver medal – second place	1954 Vancouver	110 y backstroke

Judith Patricia Symons (1935-1987), was a female swimmer who competed for England.

== Biography ==
Symons represented the English team at the 1954 British Empire and Commonwealth Games held in Vancouver, Canada, where she won the silver medal in the 110 yards backstroke event.

She was a member of the Northumberland Amateur Swimming Club and was England's swimmer of the year in 1954. She also won a bronze medal in the 100 metres backstroke at the 1954 European Aquatics Championships and at the ASA National British Championships she won the 110 yards backstroke title in 1954.
