= Valerie Nares-Pillow =

English swimmer (1936–2022)

Personal information
- Nationality: British (English)
- Born: Q3.1936 Brentford, Middlesex, England
- Died: 29 October 2022 (aged 86)

Sport
- Sport: Swimming
- Event: freestyle
- Club: Surrey Ladies
Medal record
Swimming
Representing England
British Empire & Commonwealth Games
Bronze medal – third place	1954 Vancouver	440 y freestyle relay

Valerie A Nares-Pillow (1936 – 29 October 2022), was a swimmer who competed for England.

== Biography ==
Nares-Pillow was a member of the Surrey Ladies Swimming Club and represented the English team at the 1954 British Empire and Commonwealth Games held in Vancouver, Canada, where she won the bronze medal in the 4×110 yd freestyle relay event.

She married Michael Montague in 1959 and was later known as Valerie Preston after re-marrying. She competed in Masters events as a senior.

Valerie died on the 29 October 2022 at the age of 86.
