= Bill Lindsay-Smith =

British field hockey player

Bill Linsdsay-Smith
Personal information
- Born: 19 November 1921 Burma
- Died: 29 August 2012 (aged 90)

Sport
- Sport: Field hockey
- Position: Right-half
Senior career
Years	Team	Caps	Goals
1950–1956	Ruthin	-	-
National team
Years	Team	Caps	Goals
–	Great Britain		-
–	Wales		-
Medal record
Men's field hockey
Representing Great Britain
Bronze medal – third place	1952 Helsinki	Team competition

William Aubrey Lindsay-Smith (19 November 1921 – 29 August 2012) was a British field hockey player who competed in the 1952 Summer Olympics. He was a member of the British field hockey team which won the bronze medal.

== Biography ==
Lindsay-Smith was born in Burma, due to the fact that his father was a divisional forest officer there. The family moved to Wales in 1944 and Bill attended the University College of North Wales. He followed his father into the Forestry Commission and worked as a District Officer for Gwydir Forest and then Aberystwyth.

He played hockey at University and played his club hockey for Ruthin Hockey Club and represented Wales at international level.

He received the call up for the Olympics in May 1952 and was one of three Welshman in the team with Graham Dadds and John Paskin Taylor. He subsequently represented Great Britain in the field hockey tournament at the 1952 Olympic Games in Helsinki, although he had to settle for being an unused substitute.
