= Phyllis Linton =

British swimmer (1929–2023)

Margaret Linton
Personal information
- Nationality: British (Welsh)
- Born: 9 June 1929 Newport, Wales
- Died: 19 November 2023 (aged 94)

Sport
- Sport: Swimming
- Strokes: Freestyle
- Club: Maindee SC, Newport

Phyllis Margaret Linton (9 June 1929 – 19 November 2023) was a Welsh swimmer who competed at the 1952 Summer Olympics.

== Biography ==
Linton was born in Newport, Wales and was a member of the Maindee Swimming Club of Newport and in 1947 set a Welsh record over 220 yards freestyle. She was a two-time winner of prestigious Taff Swim held in Roath Park Lake in 1949 and 1955.

She won the 1950 and 1951 ASA National Championship 110 yards freestyle titles and the 1950 ASA National Championship 220 yards freestyle title. In April 1950, Linton set a new Welsh record over the 100 yards freestyle with a time of 62.9 sec. In June 1950, she lowered her own 220 yards Welsh record with a time of 2 min 38.4 sec.

At the 1952 Olympic Games in Helsinki, Linton competed in the women's 4 × 100 metre freestyle relay.

Linton represented the Welsh team at the 1954 British Empire and Commonwealth Games in Vancouver, Canada, where she competed in the 110 yards and 440 yards freestyle events.

Linton died on 19 November 2023, at the age of 94.
