= England at the 1954 British Empire and Commonwealth Games =

- CG code: ENG
- CGA: Commonwealth Games England

in Vancouver, Canada
- Medals Ranked 1st: Gold 23 Silver 24 Bronze 20 Total 67

British Empire and Commonwealth Games appearances
- 1930; 1934; 1938; 1950; 1954; 1958; 1962; 1966; 1970; 1974; 1978; 1982; 1986; 1990; 1994; 1998; 2002; 2006; 2010; 2014; 2018; 2022; 2026; 2030

England competed at the 1954 British Empire and Commonwealth Games in Vancouver, British Columbia, Canada, from 30 July to 7 August 1954.

England topped the medal table with 23 gold medals, 24 silver medals and 20 bronze medals.

== Medal table (top 3) ==
Rank	Nation	Gold	Silver	Bronze	Total
1	England	23	24	20	67
2	Australia	20	11	17	48
3	South Africa	16	6	13	35
Totals (3 entries)		59	41	50	150

The athletes that competed are listed below.

== Team ==
=== Athletics ===
'Men

Name	Club	Age	Event/s	Medal/s
Peter Allday	London Athletic Club	27	Hammer	None
Don Anthony	Watford Harriers	25	Hammer	None
Roger Bannister	Achilles Club	25	1 mile	Gold medal
Ken Box	Loughborough College	23	100y, 220y, relay, Long jump	none
Ian Boyd	Herne Hill Harriers	21	880y, 1 mile	Bronze medal
Chris Brasher	Achilles Club	25	1 mile	none
Christopher Chataway	Achilles Club	23	3 miles	Gold medal
Derek Cox	Eton Manor AC	23	High jump, Long jump, Shot put	none
Stan Cox	Southgate Harriers	36	6 miles, Marathon	none
Alan Dick	Achilles Club	24	440y, relay	Gold medal
Peter Driver	South London Harriers	22	3 miles, 6 miles	Gold medal
Geoff Elliott	Woodford Green AC	23	Pole vault, Shot put	Gold medal
George Ellis	London Athletic Club	21	100y, 220y, relay	none
Peter Fryer	London Athletic Club	26	440y, relay	Gold medal
Fred Green	Birchfield Harriers	28	3 miles	Silver medal
Brian Hewson	Mitcham AC	21	880y	Silver medal
Peter Higgins	Southgate Harriers	25	440y, relay	Gold medal
Chris Higham	Achilles Club	23	120yh	Silver medal
Derek Johnson	Woodford Green AC	21	880y, relay	,
Harry Kane	London Athletic Club	21	440y, 440yh	Silver medal
David Law	Achilles Club	24	880y, 1 mile	none
Alan Lillington	Durham University	21	100y, 220y, relay	none
Jack Parker	South London Harriers	26	120yh	none
Jim Peters	Essex Beagles	35	6 miles, Marathon	Bronze medal
Mark Pharaoh	Walton AC	23	Discus, Shot put	Bronze medal
Frank Sando	Aylesford Paper Mills	23	3 miles, 6 miles	,
John Savidge	Royal Naval A.C.	29	Shot put, Discus,	Gold medal
Brian Shenton	Polytechnic Harriers	27	100y, 220y, relay	Silver medal
Dennis Tucker	Herne Hill Harriers	26	Javelin	none
Ken Wilmshurst	Walton AC	23	440yh, Long jump, Triple jump	,

Women

Name	Club	Age	Event/s	Medal/s
Suzanne Allday	Spartan LAC	19	Discus, Hammer, Javelin, Shot put	Silver medal
Heather Armitage	Longwood AC	21	100y, 220y, relay	Silver medal
Shirley Burgess	Woolwich Poly H	20	100y, 220y, relay	Silver medal
Jean Desforges	Essex LAC	25	80mh, Long jump	,
Shirley Hampton	Phoenix AC	18	100y, 220y, relay	,
Ann Johnson	Cambridge Harriers	20	220y, Long jump	none
Anne Pashley	Great Yarmouth AC	19	100y, relay	Silver medal
Pam Seaborne	Essex LAC	18	80mh	none
Dorothy Tyler	Mitcham AC	34	High jump, Javelin, Long jump	Silver medal

=== Boxing ===
Name	Club	Age	Event/s	Medal/s
Dave Charnley	Fitzroy Lodge BC	19	featherweight	Bronze medal
Nicholas Gargano	Army & Eton Manor BC	19	welterweight	Gold medal
Brian Harper	RAF & Blackpool	20	heavyweight	Gold medal
Bruce Wells	RAF & Caius BC	21	welterweight	Bronze medal
George Whelan	Army & Chiswick General	19	Lightweight	none

=== Cycling ===
Name	Club	Age	Event/s	Medal/s
Peter Brotherton	East Midlands Clarion	23	Pursuit, 1,000m	Silver medal
Keith Harrison	Wyndham RC	21	Time trial, Scratch, 1,000m	,
Tony Hoar	Emsworth CC	22	Road	none
Cyril Peacock	Tooting BC	25	Sprint, Time trial	Gold medal
Bernard Pusey	Redhill CC	23	Pursuit, Road	Bronze medal
Norman Sheil	Molyneux CC	21	Pursuit, Road, Scratch	Silver medal
Eric Thompson	East Midlands Clarion	27	Road, Scratch	Gold medal

=== Diving ===
Men

Name	Club	Age	Event/s	Medal/s
Frank Mercer	Highgate	26	3m Springboard	none
Peter Tarsey	Ealing	17	10m Platform	none
Tony Turner	Highgate	21	3m Springboard, 10m Platform	Silver medal

Women

Name	Club	Age	Event/s	Medal/s
Ann Long	Ilford	17	3m & 10m Platform	,
Eunice Millar	Bourne & Hollingworth	26	10m Platform	Silver medal
Charmain Welsh	Durham City	16	3m Springboard	none

=== Fencing ===
Men

Name	Club	Age	Event/s	Medal/s
Michael Amberg	London FC	28	Sabre, Sabre team	,
William Beatley		20	Sabre, Sabre team	Silver medal
Ralph Cooperman		26	Foil, Foil Team, Sabre, Sabre team	,,
Charles de Beaumont	London FC	51	Épée, Épée team	Gold medal
Allan Jay		24	Épée, Épée team, Foil, Foil Team	,,
René Paul	Salle Paul FC	33	Épée, Épée team, Foil, Foil Team	,,,

Women

Name	Club	Age	Event/s	Medal/s
Mary Glen-Haig	London FC	36	Foil	Gold medal
Gillian Sheen		25	Foil	Silver medal

=== Lawn bowls ===
Name	Club	Age	Event/s	Medal/s
Edwin Bateman	Nottingham City BC	73	pairs	none
James Carr	Southall BC	60	fours	none
John Coles	Chesham BC	62	fours	none
Stanley Lee	Hitchin BC	54	singles, fours	none
William Parker	Winchmore Hill BC	61	fours	none
Tom Stewart	Bracknell BC	70	pairs	none

=== Rowing ===
Name	Club	Age	Event/s	Medal/s
Tom Christie	RAF RC	27	Coxless pairs	Silver medal
Nicholas Clack	RAF RC	23	Coxless pairs	Silver medal
Alastair Davidson	Thames RC		Coxed fours, eights	,
Joe Eldeen	Thames RC	31	Eights	Silver medal
David Glynne-Jones	Thames RC	25	Coxed fours, eights	,
Maurice Legg	Thames RC	28	Coxed fours, eights	,
John Macmillan	Thames RC	26	Coxed fours, eights	,
Geoffrey Page	Thames RC	25	Eights	Silver medal
John Pope	Thames RC		Eights	Silver medal
Sidney Rand	RAF RC	19	Single sculls	Silver medal
M.G.C. Savage	Thames RC		Coxed fours, Eights	,
Alan Watson	Thames RC	25	Eights	Silver medal

=== Swimming ===
Men

Name	Club	Age	Event/s	Medal/s
Donald Bland	Northsea	23	440y & 1650y freestyle, freestyle relay	none
Peter Head	Ilford	19	110y & 440y freestyle, freestyle relay	none
Alan Hime	Stoke Newington	24	220y breaststroke	Bronze medal
Peter Jervis	Retford	22	220y breaststroke, medley relay	Silver medal
Haydn Rigby	Southport	17	110y backstroke, medley & freestyle relay	none
Ronald Roberts	Otter SC, London	31	110y freestyle, medley & freestyle relays	none

Women

Name	Club	Age	Event/s	Medal/s
Jean Botham	South Manchester SC	19	110y freestyle, freestyle & medley relays	Bronze medal
Fearne Ewart	Hastings SC	17	110y freestyle, freestyle relay	Bronze medal
Margaret Grundy	Blackpool	16	220y breastroke, medley relay	Bronze medal
Vivienne Meyrick	Ilford	17	110y backstroke	none
Valerie Nares-Pillow	Surrey Ladies	17	100y freestyle, freestyle relay	Bronze medal
Maureen Pitchfork	Mansfield Ladies	19	110y backstroke, medley relay	none
Pat Symons	Northumberland ASC	19	110y backstroke	Silver medal
Daphne Wilkinson	Leamington	22	440y freestyle, freestyle relay	Bronze medal

=== Weightlifting ===
Name	Club	Age	Event/s	Medal/s
Mel Barnett	Gloucester	33	Heavyweight	Bronze medal
Frank Cope	London	26	Bantamweight	Silver medal
Jim Halliday	Bolton	36	Middleweight	Gold medal
Sydney Harrington	Wolverhampton	27	Light-heavyweight	none
Maurice Megennis	Leeds	24	Bantamweight	Gold medal

=== Wrestling ===
Name	Club	Age	Event/s	Medal/s
Herbie Hall	Bolton Harriers	27	Featherweight	Silver medal
Harry Kendall	Olympic AWC, Walworth		Middleweight	Bronze medal
Allan Leyland	Bolton Harriers	20	Flyweight	none
Ray Myland	St Albans	27	Welterweight	Bronze medal
Kenneth Richmond	Foresters AWC, London	28	Heavyweight	Gold medal
