= Tony Turner (diver) =

English diver (1933–2021)

Personal information
- Nationality: British (English)
- Born: 7 February 1933 Watford, England
- Died: 30 March 2021 (aged 88) Ventura, California, United States

Sport
- Sport: Diving
- Event: Springboard / Platform
- Club: Highgate
Medal record
Diving
Representing England
British Empire & Commonwealth Games
Silver medal – second place	1954 Vancouver	3m springboard

Anthony Abraham Turner (7 February 1933 – 30 March 2021) was a diver who competed at the Olympic Games.

== Biography ==
Turner competed in springboard and platform events at the 1952 Summer Olympics.

Turner also represented the English team at the 1954 British Empire and Commonwealth Games held in Vancouver, Canada, where he won the silver medal in the 3m springboard diving event.
