= 1958 NCAA swimming and diving championships =

American college aquatic sports competition

- Host city: Ann Arbor, Michigan
- Date(s): March 1958
- Venue(s): Intramural Sports Building; University of Michigan
- Teams: 24
- Events: 16

The 1958 NCAA swimming and diving championships were contested in March 1958 at the Intramural Sports Building at the University of Michigan in Ann Arbor, Michigan at the 22nd annual NCAA-sanctioned swim meet to determine the team and individual national champions of men's collegiate swimming and diving among its member programs in the United States.

The program featured sixteen individual events, fourteen in swimming and two for diving. Teams earned points based on their placement in individual events, with the highest-earning team receiving the national title.

Michigan retained the national title, the Wolverines' second consecutive and eighth overall, after finishing nine points ahead of Yale in the team standings.

== Team standings ==
- (H) = Hosts
- (DC) = Defending champions
- Italics = Debut appearance

Rank	Team	Points
1st place, gold medalist(s)	Michigan (H, DC)	72
2nd place, silver medalist(s)	Yale	63
3rd place, bronze medalist(s)	Michigan State	62
4	Ohio State	44
5	Iowa	31
6	Harvard	16
7	Illinois	14
8	Northwestern	12
8	Oklahoma	12
10	SMU	11
11	Wisconsin	8
12	Cal Poly	7
12	Indiana	7
14	North Carolina	6
14	Stanford	6
16	Brown	4
16	Miami (FL)	4
18	Allegheny	3
18	Cornell	3
18	Ohio	3
18	Utah	3
22	Bowdoin	2
23	Bowling Green State	1
23	Colgate	1

== Individual events ==
=== Swimming ===
Event	Champion	Team	Time
50 yard freestyle	Gary Morris	Iowa	22.4
100 yard freestyle	Donald Patterson	Michigan State	49.5
220 yard freestyle	Roger Anderson	Yale	2:03.7
440 yard freestyle	(South Africa) Billy Steuart	Michigan State	4:34.3
1,500 meter freestyle	(South Africa) Billy Steuart	Michigan State	18:45.8
100 yard backstroke	James Dolbey	Yale	57.8
200 yard backstroke	Dave Pemberton	Northwestern	2:08.0
100 yard breaststroke	Franklin Modine	Michigan State	1:05.0
200 yard breaststroke	Franklin Modine	Michigan State	2:25.4
100 yard butterfly	Tony Tashnick	Michigan	54.6
200 yard butterfly	Tony Tashnick	Michigan	2:04.2
200 yard individual medley	Joe Hunsaker	Illinois	2:09.6
400 yard freestyle relay	Robert Connell; Charles Bechtel; Richard Dewey; Joseph Van Horn	Ohio State	3:23.1
400 yard medley relay	James Dolbey; Timothy Jecko; Joseph Koletsky; Charles Bronston	Yale	3:48.6

=== Diving ===
Event	Champion	Team	Score
1 meter diving	Donald Harper	Ohio State	481.25
3 meter diving	Donald Harper	Ohio State	518.90

== See also ==
- NAIA men's swimming and diving championships
- List of college swimming and diving teams
