= Maureen Pitchfork =

English swimmer

Personal information
- Nationality: British (English)
- Born: Fourth quarter 1934 Mansfield, England

Sport
- Sport: Swimming
- Event: Backstroke
- Club: Mansfield Ladies

Maureen Pitchfork married name Arnold (born 1934) is an English former swimmer and coach.

== Biography ==
In 1949 at age 14, the Mansfield Woodhouse schoolgirl gained one of twelve places offered by the English Amateur Swimming Association for a coaching programme aimed at the 1952 Olympic Games.

Pitchfork represented the English team at the 1954 British Empire and Commonwealth Games held in Vancouver, Canada, where she participated in the 110y backstroke and medley relay events.

Pitchfork threw discus for Great Britain in 1962 and for some time coached swimmer Rebecca Adlington.
