= Cyrus Weld =

Australian swimmer

Cyrus weld second left
Personal information
- Born: 14 August 1936
- Died: 9 August 1996 (aged 59)

Sport
- Sport: Swimming
- Strokes: Backstroke, freestyle
Medal record
Representing Australia
British Empire and Commonwealth Games
| Gold medal – first place | 1954 Vancouver | 3x110yd medley relay |
| Silver medal – second place | 1954 Vancouver | 110yd freestyle |
| Bronze medal – third place | 1954 Vancouver | 110yd backstroke |

Cyrus James Weld (14 August 1936 – 9 August 1996) was an Australian swimmer known for his unorthodox swimming style and extreme pace, who competed at the 1954 British Empire and Commonwealth Games in Vancouver, Canada, to win the gold medal relay 3 × 110 yards. Weld suffered from asthma and took up swimming aged 9 for medical reasons.
