= Graham Dadds =

British field hockey player

Personal information
- Born: 16 March 1911 Swansea, Wales
- Died: 8 March 1980 (aged 68) Swansea, Wales

Sport
- Sport: Field hockey
- Position: Goalkeeper
Senior career
Years	Team	Caps	Goals
1930–1956	Swansea Nomads	-	-
National team
Years	Team	Caps	Goals
–	Great Britain	7	-
1932–1955	Wales	36	-
Medal record
Men's field hockey
Representing Great Britain
Bronze medal – third place	1952 Helsinki	Team competition

Graham Bassett Dadds (16 March 1911 – 8 March 1980) was a British field hockey player who competed in the 1952 Summer Olympics.

== Biography ==
Dadds played club hockey for Swansea Nomads and between 1932 and 1955 played for Wales 36 times, which was a record at the time.

He played for Glamorgan at county level but in 1946 had a break from hockey due to health reasons before returning to the Welsh side several years later.

Dadds received the call up for the Olympics in May 1952 and was one of three Welshman in the team with John Paskin Taylor and Bill Lindsay-Smith. He subsequently represented Great Britain in the field hockey tournament at the 1952 Olympic Games in Helsinki. He played in the bronze medal match against Pakistan replacing Derek Day who had started every match up to that point. Dadds was 42-years-old at the time.

Dadds retired from playing in 1956 and later served as the president of the Welsh Hockey Association.
