= Jack Doms =

New Zealand swimmer (1927–2018)

Personal information
- Born: John Allan Doms; 22 January 1927
- Died: 22 January 2018 (aged 91) Cambridge, New Zealand
- Spouse: Maureen Lillian Holman (m. 1952)

Sport
- Country: New Zealand
- Sport: Swimming
- Coached by: Bob Frankham

Achievements and titles
- National finals: 100 yd breastroke champion (1952, 1953, 1954, 1955); 220 yd breaststroke champion (1952, 1953, 1954, 1955)
Medal record
Men's swimming
Representing New Zealand
British Empire & Commonwealth Games
| Gold medal – first place | 1954 Vancouver | 220 yards Breaststroke |
| Silver medal – second place | 1954 Vancouver | 330 yards Medley Relay |

John Allan Doms (22 January 1927 – 22 January 2018) was a New Zealand swimmer. He won gold and silver medals at the 1954 British Empire and Commonwealth Games in Vancouver, becoming the first New Zealander to win an individual swimming gold medal at a British Empire or Commonwealth Games.

== Biography ==
Born on 22 January 1927, Doms married Maureen Holman in 1952. Holman is also a swimmer of some note, having won the women's 440 yards at the New Zealand national championships in 1948. The couple went on to have three daughters. Both Holman and Doms were coached by Bob Frankham.

In all, Doms won eight New Zealand national swimming titles, winning both the 100- and 220-yards breaststroke titles every year from 1952 to 1955.

At the 1954 British Empire and Commonwealth Games Doms won the gold medal in the men's 220 yards breaststroke — the first New Zealander to win an individual swimming championship at a British Empire and Commonwealth Games. He also won the silver medal in the men's 330 yards medley relay with teammates Lincoln Hurring and Buddy Lucas. Doms retired from competitive swimming after the 1958 national championships.

Aged 55, Doms ran his first marathon after meeting Arthur Lydiard while playing golf. As of 2004, he had completed 78 marathons and countless half-marathons.

In 2000, Doms was one of about 300 New Zealanders who carried the Olympic torch during the New Zealand leg of the 2000 Summer Olympics torch relay.

Doms died in Cambridge on 22 January 2018, his 91st birthday.

== See also ==
- List of Commonwealth Games medallists in swimming (men)
