= Tony Tashnick =

American swimmer (1938–2026)

Personal information
- Full name: Anthony Tashnick Jr.
- Nickname: Tony Tashnick
- National team: United States
- Born: August 18, 1938 Detroit, Michigan, U.S.
- Died: September 26, 2026 (aged 88) Pinckney, Michigan, U.S.

Sport
- Sport: Swimming
- Strokes: Butterfly
- College team: University of Michigan
Medal record
Representing Michigan
NCAA
Gold medal – first place	1958 Ann Arbor	Team title
Gold medal – first place	1958 Ann Arbor	100 yard butterfly
Gold medal – first place	1958 Ann Arbor	200 yard butterfly

Anthony Tashnick Jr. (August 18, 1938 – September 26, 2026) was an American versatile swimmer.

== Biography ==
A native of Detroit, Michigan, Tashnick led his Mackenzie Stags to a first-place trophy at the 1956 city league (DPSSAL) championships. Teaming with Howard Scarborough, JC Smith and Richard Boka; Tashnick and company sealed victory for Mackenzie by defeating Denby High in the final event. During the summer of 1956, high school All-Americans Tashnick, Scarborough and Smith competed at the United States Olympic Trials.

Two years later, Tony was US collegiate champion in the 100 & 200 yard butterfly; his double-victory led the University of Michigan to the 1958 National Collegiate Athletic Association swimming title.

By the late 1950s, Tashnick had firmly established himself as one of the best all-around swimmers in the United States; setting US Open records in the 100-yard butterfly, the 200-yard butterfly, and 200-yard individual medley. In 1959, Tony competed at the Pan American Games in Chicago; finishing fourth in the 200-meter butterfly. During his senior year at the University of Michigan, team captain Tashnick swam the 200-meter butterfly at the 1960 United States Olympic Trials. In the final 20-meters of a fiercely contested race, Wolverine teammate Dave Gillanders moved ahead of Tony for the final Olympic berth. Finishing in third place, Tony Tashnick had narrowly missed a trip to the Summer Games of Rome, Italy.

Tashnick died in Pinckney, Michigan, on September 26, 2026, at the age of 88.
