= Jean Botham =

British swimmer (1935–2021)

Personal information
- Nationality: British (English)
- Born: 12 February 1935 West Ham, Essex, England
- Died: 30 June 2021 (aged 86)

Sport
- Sport: Swimming
- Strokes: freestyle
- Club: South Manchester SC
Medal record
Swimming
Representing England
British Empire & Commonwealth Games
Bronze medal – third place	1954 Vancouver	440y freestyle relay

Jean Annabel Botham (12 February 1935 – 30 June 2021) was a British swimmer who competed at the 1952 Summer Olympics.

== Biography ==
At the 1952 Olympic Games in helsinki, Botham swam in 100 metres freestyle and relay event.

She represented the English team at the 1954 British Empire and Commonwealth Games held in Vancouver, Canada, where she won the bronze medal in the 4×110 yd freestyle relay event.

She won the 1953 and 1954 ASA National Championship 110 yards freestyle titles and the 1954 ASA National Championship 220 yards freestyle title.

She emigrated to Canada in 1958.
