= Haydn Rigby =

English swimmer

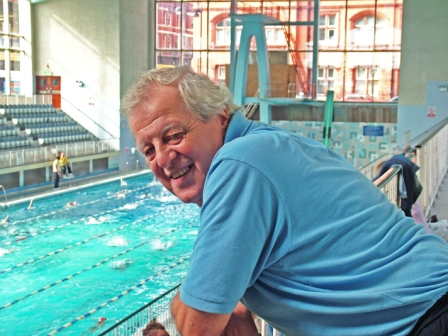

Personal information
- Nationality: British (English)
- Born: 18 December 1936 (age 88) Southport, Merseyside, England
- Height: 178 cm (5 ft 10 in)
- Weight: 71 kg (157 lb)

Sport
- Sport: Swimming
- Strokes: Backstroke
- Club: Southport

Haydn Rigby (born 18 December 1936) is an English former backstroke swimmer who competed at two Olympic Games.

== Biography ==
Born in Southport, Merseyside, England, Rigby represented Great Britain at two consecutive Summer Olympics in 1956 and 1960.

He represented England at the 1954 British Empire and Commonwealth Games in Vancouver, Canada and the 1958 British Empire and Commonwealth Games in Cardiff, Wales.

Rigby started Wigan Wasps Swimming Team and coached at the Wigan International Swimming Pool. Hayden taught many of the national champions and international swimmers from the 1990s how to swim and is still very much involved in the sport of swimming. He continues to coach youngsters at Wigan Swimming Club Wasps and also coaches the younger groups training in the Wigan best swimming squad.
