= Jack Wardrop =

British swimmer (born 1932)

Jack Waldrop
Personal information
- Nickname: "Jack"
- Nationality: British (Scottish)
- Born: 26 May 1932 (age 94) Glasgow, Scotland

Sport
- Sport: Swimming
- Strokes: Freestyle
- Club: Motherwell Swimming Club
- College team: University of Michigan
- Coach: Matthew Mann; U of Michigan
Medal record
Men's swimming
Representing Scotland
British Empire and Commonwealth Games
Silver medal – second place	1954 Vancouver	440 yd freestyle
Bronze medal – third place	1954 Vancouver	3×110 yd medley
Representing Michigan
NCAA
Gold medal – first place	1954 Syracuse	220 yard freestyle
Gold medal – first place	1955 Oxford	220 yard freestyle

John Caldwell Wardrop (born 26 May 1932) is a male former competitive swimmer who represented Great Britain and Scotland.

== Swimming career ==
While Wardrop was competing for Scotland, he won a silver and bronze medal at the 1954 British Empire and Commonwealth Games in Vancouver. Wardrop also competed for Great Britain at the 1948 Summer Olympics, 1952 Summer Olympics, and 1956 Summer Olympics.

He represented the Scottish team at the 1954 British Empire and Commonwealth Games in Vancouver, Canada, where he participated in the 440y freestyle and medley relay events. He won the bronze medal in the medley relay and silver medal in the freestyle.

=== Swimming at Michigan ===
Wardrop attended the University of Michigan, where he swam for the Michigan Wolverines swimming and diving team in National Collegiate Athletic Association (NCAA) and Big Ten Conference competition from 1953 to 1955. He won NCAA national championships in the 220-yard freestyle in 1954 and 1955. He won the 1952 ASA National Championship 110 yards freestyle title, and the 1950, 1952 and 1954 ASA National Championship 220 yards freestyle titles and the 1950, 1951 and 1952 ASA National Championship 440 yards freestyle titles.

== Personal life ==
He is the twin brother of Bert Wardrop and the pair learned to swim at Motherwell Baths. They were members of the Motherwell Amateur Swimming & Water Polo Club.

== See also ==
- List of Commonwealth Games medallists in swimming (men)
- List of University of Michigan alumni
- World record progression 200 metres freestyle

Records
Preceded by Ford Konno	Men's 200-metre freestyle world record-holder (long course); 4 March 1955 – 8 March 1957	Succeeded by Dick Hanley
