= Dick Hanley (swimmer) =

American swimmer (1936–2022)

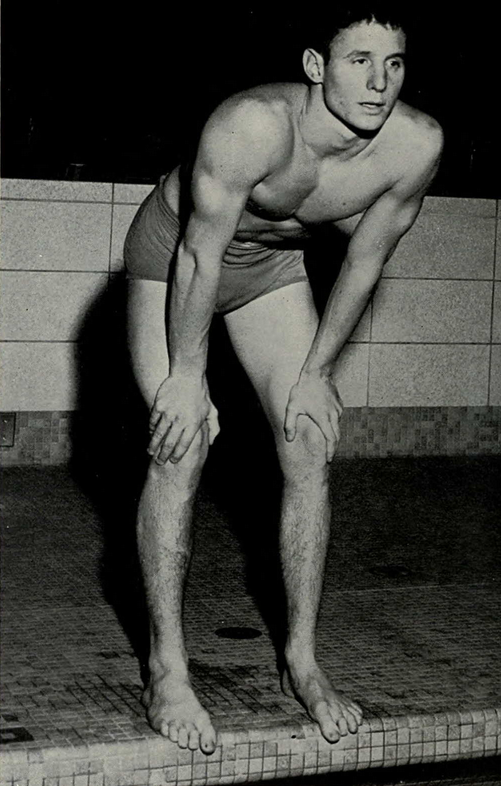
- Hanley at Michigan in 1957.

Personal information
- Full name: Richard Dennis Hanley
- Nickname: "Dick"
- National team: United States
- Born: February 19, 1936 Evanston, Illinois
- Died: May 11, 2022 (aged 86) Skokie, Illinois
- Height: 6 ft 0 in (1.83 m)
- Weight: 174 lb (79 kg)
- Spouse: Judy Loftus

Sport
- Sport: Swimming
- Strokes: Freestyle
- College team: University of Michigan
- Coach: Gus Stager (U. Michigan); Bob Muir ('56 Olympics)
Medal record
Men's swimming
Representing the United States
Olympic Games
Silver medal – second place	1956 Melbourne	4×200 m freestyle
Representing Michigan
NCAA
Gold medal – first place	1957 Chapel Hill	Team title
Gold medal – first place	1957 Chapel Hill	400 yard medley relay
Gold medal – first place	1959 Ithaca	Team title
Gold medal – first place	1959 Ithaca	220 yard freestyle
Gold medal – first place	1959 Ithaca	400 yard freestyle relay
Gold medal – first place	1959 Ithaca	400 yard medley relay

Richard Dennis Hanley (February 19, 1936 – May 11, 2022) was an American competition swimmer, Olympic medalist, and former world record-holder.

== Early life and swimming ==
Hanley was born in Evanston, Illinois, on February 19, 1936 to Jane Hunter Hanley and Myron "Mike" Hanley, and attended and swam for the Evanston Township High School "Wildkits", an Illinois swimming dynasty. Competing for Evanston High in February 1954, he qualified for the Suburban League varsity swimming meet in both the 100 and 200-yard freestyle.

As a high school junior in February 1954, he held the record in the 100-yard freestyle with a time of 54.8. Swimming the freestyle leg in 1955, he was part of a 150-yard medley relay team that lowered their own interscholastic record to 1:18 in the finals of the Suburban League meet.

In 1955, at around 18, Hanley also set and held the Illinois state record for the 50-yard freestyle.

Under coach Dobbie Burton, Evanston High won state championships each year from 1952 to 1956 and won 52 straight dual meets over a three-year period.

== Swimming for Michigan ==
He attended the University of Michigan, where he swam for Hall of Fame Coach Gus Stager and was a varsity swimmer for the Michigan Wolverines swimming and diving team in National Collegiate Athletic Association (NCAA) competition from 1955 to 1959.

He was a member of the Michigan Wolverines' NCAA national championship teams in the 400-yard medley relay in 1957 and 1959 and the 400-yard freestyle relay in 1959. In the same year, he won an individual NCAA national championship in the 200-yard freestyle.

== 1956 Melbourne Olympic medal ==
At the 1956 Summer Olympics in Melbourne, Australia, he was managed by U.S. Men's Olympic Head Coach Bob Muir. Hanley received a silver medal for swimming the lead-off leg for the runner-up U.S. team in the men's 4×200-meter freestyle relay.

After college, he continued to swim and trained and competed in Masters Swimming for Evanston Masters. Hanley worked as a professor and swimming coach at the Chicago City Colleges.

He died May 11, 2022 in Skokie, Illinois. He was married to Judy Loftus, had one son, and was a grandfather. He also had a daughter Lindsay from another relationship.

== See also ==
- List of Olympic medalists in swimming (men)
- List of University of Michigan alumni
- World record progression 200 metres freestyle
