= Matthew Mann =

British-American swimmer (1884–1962)

Matthew D. Mann II
- Mann in 1925

Biographical details
- Born: December 21, 1884; Leeds, West Yorkshire, England
- Died: August 6, 1962 (aged 77); Burk's Falls, Ontario, Canada

Coaching career (HC unless noted)
- 1910-: Syracuse University
- 1915-1917: Yale; 17-3
- 1910-1920: Harvard, Navy; Dates vary
- 1921-1925: Detroit Athletic Club
- 1924-1954: University of Michigan
- 1954-1962: University of Oklahoma
- 1952: US Olympic Head Coach

Head coaching record
- Overall: 203-25-3.885 Win Pct. U Michigan

Accomplishments and honors

Championships
- 16 Western Conference Titles; 13 NCAA Team Titles; 1937-51 Five Consecutive NCAA Titles (U of Michigan); 8 Big Eight Conference Titles (University of Oklahoma)

Awards
- '65 International Swim. Hall of Fame '80 U. Michigan Athletic Hall of Honor '59 Michigan Sports Hall of Fame

Matthew "Matt" Mann II (December 21, 1884 – August 6, 1962) was a British-born competitive swimmer and Hall of Fame American swimming coach born in Leeds, known for coaching the University of Michigan from 1925 to 1954, where he led his swimmers to 13 NCAA team titles. Considered one of the winningest coaches in American history, he served as the Head Coach of the U.S. men's swim team in the 1952 Summer Olympics that won four gold medals, two silver medals and one bronze medal.

== Early swimming and emigration ==
Mann learned to swim at eight in his hometown of Leeds, West Yorkshire, England, at the public bath house. He had the money to swim there once a week, on 'dirty water days', as the cost was only a penny. Otherwise, he swam in the outdoor sluiceways that drained from the wool mills. At nine, he was England's boy champion and became a senior champion at 14.

In his early 20s, he emigrated penniless to North America in 1908, with his International Swimming Hall of Fame biography stating: "Matt emigrated steerage to the USA, was stopped at Ellis Island for insufficient funds, shipped to Toronto in a sealed railroad car with $2.00 left in his pocket. Walking down Yonge Street, he found a room for $1.00 a week, then bought a week's meal tickets in a bean wagon for his other dollar. 'I was on top of the world,' said Matt. 'I had no money but my needs were taken care of and I had a whole week to look for a job.'"

At 16, he became the British Empire Champion in swimming. At 21, he came to Canada and then to the United States by 1908, where he first settled in Buffalo and soon set national YMCA records for the 100 and 220-yard freestyle events.

== Coaching assignments ==
In 1907, he was one of the country's first High School Swim coaches in Buffalo, New York. In 1910, he coached at Syracuse University, and while coaching there he is credited by many with first introducing or at least popularizing the crawl stroke for competitive swimming. He also coached briefly at America's first Municipal pool in Brookline, Massachusetts. At one point, as an itinerant coach, he coached at the New York Athletic Club, Yale, Brooklyn's Poly Prep, and Navy all in one season.

He coached at Yale University from 1915 to 1917, just before Bob Kiphuth became Head Coach. Prior to 1921, he also coached at Harvard University. From 1921 to 1925, he was head coach of the Detroit Athletic Club's swim team. While at the Detroit Athletic Club, he coached the 1920 Olympic Gold and Silver medalist Margaret Woodbridge. He was one of the only coaches to have coached at both Harvard and Yale.

=== Michigan and Oklahoma ===
He coached 13 National Collegiate Athletic Association champion swimming teams at the University of Michigan between 1924 and 1954, which also won 16 Western Conference titles. During his tenure as Michigan coach, he turned out more Olympic swimmers than any other American college or university. After he was forced to retire at the University of Michigan because of mandatory retirement age rules, at the age of 70 he coached at the University of Oklahoma from around 1954–1962, leading them to eight Big Eight conference titles.

His outstanding male swimmers included 1936 Olympic gold medalist and diver Richard Degener, 1932 freestyle Olympic medalist Jim Cristy, 1936 Olympian and Coach Taylor Drysdale, NCAA Backstroke champion and world record holder Harry Holiday, 1952 Olympians Burwell Jones and backstroke gold medalist John Davies, 1953-55 NCAA freestyle champion Jack Wardrop and brother 1952 backstroke Olympian Bert Wardrop. Matt also coached his own son Matt Mann III who became a high school coach.

=== '52 Olympic Coach ===
He was head coach of the U.S. Men's Swimming Team at the 1952 Summer Olympics. His University of Michigan swimmer John Davies took a gold medal, winning the 200-meter men's breaststroke in an Olympic record time of 2:34.4. The team took an additional three gold, two silver and a bronze medal.

=== Founding Camp Chikopi ===
Coach Mann was the founder and owner one of the first sport-specific summer camps. After purchasing land along a Canadian lake, he opened a boys swim camp, Camp Chikopi, near Burk's Falls, Ontario, in 1920. Many peers from coaching and friends attended the summer camp and a number of Olympic athletes trained and developed there. Coach Mann and his wife, Lea (Block) Mann, operated Camp Chikopi until Matt's death in 1962.

=== Honors ===
In 1980, he was inducted into the University of Michigan Hall of Honor, and later the American Swimming Coaches Association Hall of Honor. He was inducted into the Michigan Sports Hall of Fame in 1959. He was one of the 21 people to be inducted into the International Swimming Hall of Fame when it was formed in 1965. He was one of only two coaches (with Robert Kiphuth) and two Britons (with English Channel swimmer Captain Matthew Webb) to be inducted.

Many of Mann's swimmers went on to coaching. These include Gus Stager, his Michigan successor, Stanford's Tom Hainey, Pittsburgh's Ben Grady, Michigan State's Charles McCaffree, who served as his Assistant Coach in 1936-7, and Williams College's Bob Muir.

=== Death in 1962 ===
On August 6, 1962, Mann died at Camp Chikopi, which he founded in 1920 in Northern Ontario, Canada near Burk's Falls. A cause of death remained undetermined, but he had felt well that day, and the prior day. He collapsed in his bathroom after telling his family he felt tired, and several press reports speculated a heart attack as cause of death.

His survivors, several of who continued to operate Camp Chikopi, included his wife Mary Lea, his daughter Mrs. Rosemary Dawson, and his son Matthew Mann III, a U of Michigan swimming star and later coach at Lansing High School. Another daughter, Mrs. Constance Willard was not present at his death. He was a member of the Ann Arbor Rotary Club, the First Church of Christ Scientist, and Phi Kappa Tau Fraternity. His funeral was on August 9 at Muehlig Funeral Chapel in Ann Arbor, Michigan.

== See also ==
- List of members of the International Swimming Hall of Fame
- University of Michigan Athletic Hall of Honor
