= 1959 NCAA swimming and diving championships =

American college aquatic sports competition

- Host city: (New York (state)) Ithaca, New York
- Date(s): March 26−28, 1959
- Venue(s): Teagle Pool; Cornell University
- Teams: 63
- Athletes participating: 273
- Events: 16

The 1959 NCAA swimming and diving championships were contested on March 26−28, 1959 at Teagle Pool at Cornell University in Ithaca, New York at the 23rd annual NCAA-sponsored swim meet to determine the team and individual national champions of men's collegiate swimming and diving among its member programs in the United States. Including the pre-NCAA championships from before 1937, these were the 36th overall collegiate swimming and diving championships.

The program featured sixteen individual events, fourteen in swimming and two for diving. Teams earned points based on their placement in individual events, with the highest-earning team receiving the national title.

Michigan once again retained the national title, the Wolverines' ninth (and third consecutive), after finishing a record ninety-three points ahead of Ohio State in the team standings.

== Team standings ==
- (H) = Hosts
- (DC) = Defending champions
- Italics = Debut appearance

Rank	Team	Points
1st place, gold medalist(s)	Michigan	137 1/2
2nd place, silver medalist(s)	Ohio State	44
3rd place, bronze medalist(s)	Indiana	41
4	Yale	35 1/2
5	Michigan State	35
6	Stanford	29
7	Iowa	16
8	Oklahoma	12
9	Miami (OH)	7
9	Ohio	7
9	Wisconsin	7
12	Cal Poly	6
12	Illinois	6
14	California	4
15	Harvard	3
16	SMU	2
17	Florida State	1
17	Knox	1
17	Navy	1

== Individual events ==
=== Swimming ===
Event	Champion	Team	Time
50 yard freestyle	Fred Westphal	Wisconsin	22.3
100 yard freestyle	Frank Legacki	Michigan	49.6
220 yard freestyle	Dick Hanley	Michigan	2:04.3
440 yard freestyle	(South Africa) Billy Steuart (DC)	Michigan State	18:26.2
1,500 meter freestyle	(South Africa) Billy Steuart (DC)	Michigan State	4:31.9
100 yard backstroke	Frank McKinney	Indiana	56.1
200 yard backstroke	Frank McKinney	Indiana	2:01.4
100 yard breaststroke	Gordon Collet	Oklahoma	1:03.2
200 yard breaststroke	William Muliken	Miami (OH)	2:21.3
100 yard butterfly	Dave Gillanders	Michigan	54.1
200 yard butterfly	Dave Gillanders	Michigan	2:02.5
200 yard individual medley	George Harrison	Stanford	2:06.7
400 yard freestyle relay	John McGuire; Carl Woolley; Dick Hanley; Frank Legacki	Michigan	3:21.6
400 yard medley relay	John Smith; Ronald Clark; Dave Gillanders; Dick Hanley	Michigan	3:46.8

=== Diving ===
Event	Champion	Team	Score
1 meter diving	Ron O'Brien	Ohio State	468.95
3 meter diving	Sam Hall	Ohio State	465.10

== See also ==
- NAIA men's swimming and diving championships
- List of college swimming and diving teams
