= Alan Clarkson (swimmer) =

English swimmer

Personal information
- Nationality: British (English)
- Born: 12 September 1936 Great Ouseburn, Yorkshire, England
- Died: 23 May 2010 (aged 73) York, England

Sport
- Sport: Swimming
- Event: Freestyle
- Club: York City

Alan Malcolm Clarkson OBE (12 September 1936 – 23 May 2010), was a male swimmer who competed for England.

== Biography ==
Clarkson was educated at Nunthorpe Grammar School. He was a five-time Yorkshire champion over 1500 metres in 1956, 1960, 1962, 1963 and 1964, and the champion over 200 and 400 freestyle in 1959, in addition to gaining international honours with Great Britain against Australia.

He represented the English team at the 1958 British Empire and Commonwealth Games in Cardiff, Wales, where he competed in the 440 yards freestyle event.

He was the manager for the 1970, 1974 and 1978 Commonwealth Games teams and in 2004 he was appointed an OBE and received a long service award from the British Olympic Association in 2007. He was also a judge at four Olympic Games at Moscow in 1980, Los Angeles in 1984, Seoul in 1988 and Barcelona in 1992.

He was an accountant by trade and was married to Pauline Musgrave.
