= John Paskin Taylor =

British field hockey player

John Taylor
Personal information
- Born: 18 March 1928 Bangalore, British India
- Died: 9 March 2015 (aged 86) Boulogne-Billancourt, France

Sport
- Sport: Field hockey
- Position: Inside-right/winger
Senior career
Years	Team	Caps	Goals
1951–1953	Cambridge University	-	-
1954–1955	Rhyl	-	-
National team
Years	Team	Caps	Goals
–	Great Britain		-
–	Wales		-
Medal record
Men's field hockey
Representing Great Britain
Bronze medal – third place	1952 Helsinki	Team competition

John Paskin Taylor (18 March 1928 – 9 March 2015) was a British field hockey player who competed in the 1952 Summer Olympics.

== Biography ==
Taylor was born in Bangalore, British India, the son of a Wesleyan minister. He was educated at Kingswood School in Bath and studied at Trinity College, Cambridge.

He played for and became secretary of the Cambridge University hockey team and won his blue in 1951 and 1952. After Cambridge he played club hockey for Rhyl Hockey Club and represented Wales at international level.

Taylor received the call up for the Olympics in May 1952 and was one of three Welshman in the team with Graham Dadds and Bill Lindsay-Smith. He subsequently represented Great Britain in the field hockey tournament at the 1952 Olympic Games in Helsinki, where he won the bronze medal. He played one match as forward.
