= William Patrick (diver) =

Canadian diver

Personal information
- Full name: William Cornelius Patrick
- Born: 19 December 1931 Calgary, Alberta, Canada
- Died: 22 June 2016 (aged 84) Calgary, Alberta, Canada

Sport
- Sport: Diving
Medal record
Representing Canada
British Empire and Commonwealth Games
Gold medal – first place	1954 Vancouver	10m platform
Silver medal – second place	1958 Cardiff	3m springboard

William Cornelius Patrick (19 December 1931 – 22 June 2016) was a Canadian diver who competed in the 1956 Summer Olympics.
