= Barbara McAulay =

Australian diver (1929–2020)

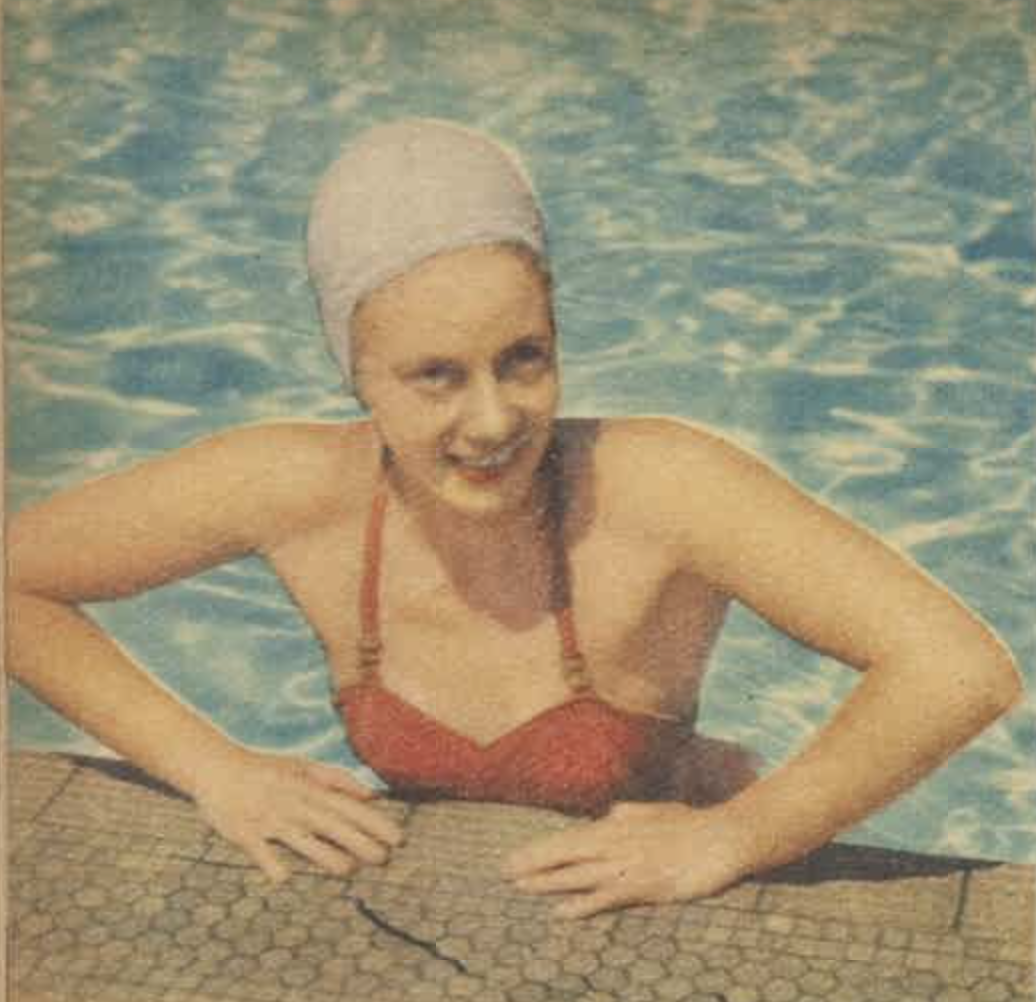
- Barbara McAulay, 1952

Personal information
- Born: Barbara Ethel McAulay; 15 March 1929 Victoria, Australia
- Died: 5 November 2020 (aged 91)

Sport
- Country: Australia
- Event(s): 3m springboard, 10m platform
- Team: Australian Commonwealth Games team, Australian Olympic team
- Partner: Tom Donnet (d. 1978)
- Retired: 2016
Medal record
Representing Australia
Women's Diving
British Empire and Commonwealth Games
Gold medal – first place	1954 Vancouver	10m platform
Silver medal – second place	1954 Vancouver	3m springboard

Barbara Ethel McAulay Donnet (15 March 1929 – 5 November 2020) was an Australian diver. She competed in the 1954 British Empire and Commonwealth Games and the 1956 Melbourne Olympic Games.

== Diving career ==
McAulay won the gold medal at 1954 British Empire and Commonwealth Games in Vancouver, Canada, in the 10m platform, and in the 3m springboard, she finished second to Phyllis Long. At the 1956 Melbourne Olympics McAulay finished 13th in the 3m springboard and 14th in the 10m platform.

In 1957, McAulay toured the United States of America as a professional diver in the Water Follies. Upon her return, McAulay, with her husband Tom Donnet, taught swimming and diving in Melbourne and toured country Victoria, running clinics and exhibitions. Upon Tom's death in 1978, Barbara took over the elite diving squad and produced divers who competed at World Age Championships, Commonwealth Games, World Championships, and Olympics over a span of 16 years. She was a coach at the 1982 and 1990 Commonwealth Games, as well as the 1992 Olympic Games. She continued to coach diving until her retirement in 2016.

== Personal ==
McAulay married Olympic diving coach Tom Donnet. She was the mother of Jenny Donnet, a four time Olympic diver, and Barbi Donnet, an Australian representative at world level in diving. McAulay died on 5 November 2020 at the age of 91.
