= Ronald Roberts (swimmer) =

British swimmer

Personal information
- Nationality: British (English)
- Born: 11 December 1922 Belton, Lincolnshire, England
- Died: 19 June 2012 (aged 89)

Sport
- Sport: Swimming
- Strokes: freestyle
- Club: Otter SC, London

Ronald Roberts (11 December 1922 – 19 June 2012) was a British swimmer who competed at the 1952 Summer Olympics and the 1956 Summer Olympics.

== Biography ==
At the 1952 Olympic Games in Helsinki, Roberts participated in the 100 metres freestyle event.

He represented the English team at the 1954 British Empire and Commonwealth Games held in Vancouver, Canada, where he participated in the freestyle and relay events.

He won the 1953 and 1955 ASA National Championship 110 yards freestyle titles and the 1953 ASA National Championship 220 yards freestyle title.

He went to his second Olympic Games in Melbourne in 1956 where he swam in the 100 metres freestyle and freestyle relay.
