= Margaret McDowall =

Scottish swimmer

Personal information
- Nationality: British (Scottish)
- Born: 10 January 1936 Kilmarnock, Scotland
- Died: 31 December 2009 (aged 73) Kilmarnock, Scotland

Sport
- Sport: Swimming
- Event: Backstroke
- Club: Kilmarnock SC
Medal record
Women's swimming
Representing Scotland
British Empire and Commonwealth Games
Gold medal – first place	1954 Vancouver	3×110 yd medley

Margaret Gibson McDowall (10 January 1936 – 31 December 2009) was a Scottish female competitive swimmer who represented Scotland and participated in the 1952 Summer Olympics.

== Swimming career ==
McDowall was educated at Kilmarnock Academy and was a member of the Scottish Swimming Team from the age of 14. Unusually she practiced in the local municipal swimming baths in Kilmarnock rather than any purpose-built training facility.

She was a member of the three-woman relay team at the 1954 Commonwealth games in Vancouver, British Columbia, Canada and at the ASA National British Championships she won the 110 yards backstroke title four times (1950, 1951, 1952, 1953).

She was selected for the 1958 Scottish team for the 1958 British Empire and Commonwealth Games in Cardiff, Wales, where she competed in the 110 yards backstroke.

McDowall died on 31 December 2009, at the age of 73.
