= Pauline Musgrave =

British swimmer

Personal information
- Born: 25 July 1936 (age 90)

Sport
- Sport: Swimming

Pauline Musgrave (born 25 July 1936) is a British former swimmer. She competed in the women's 400 metre freestyle at the 1952 Summer Olympics.

She married Alan Clarkson.
