= Fernando Fanjul =

Argentine swimmer

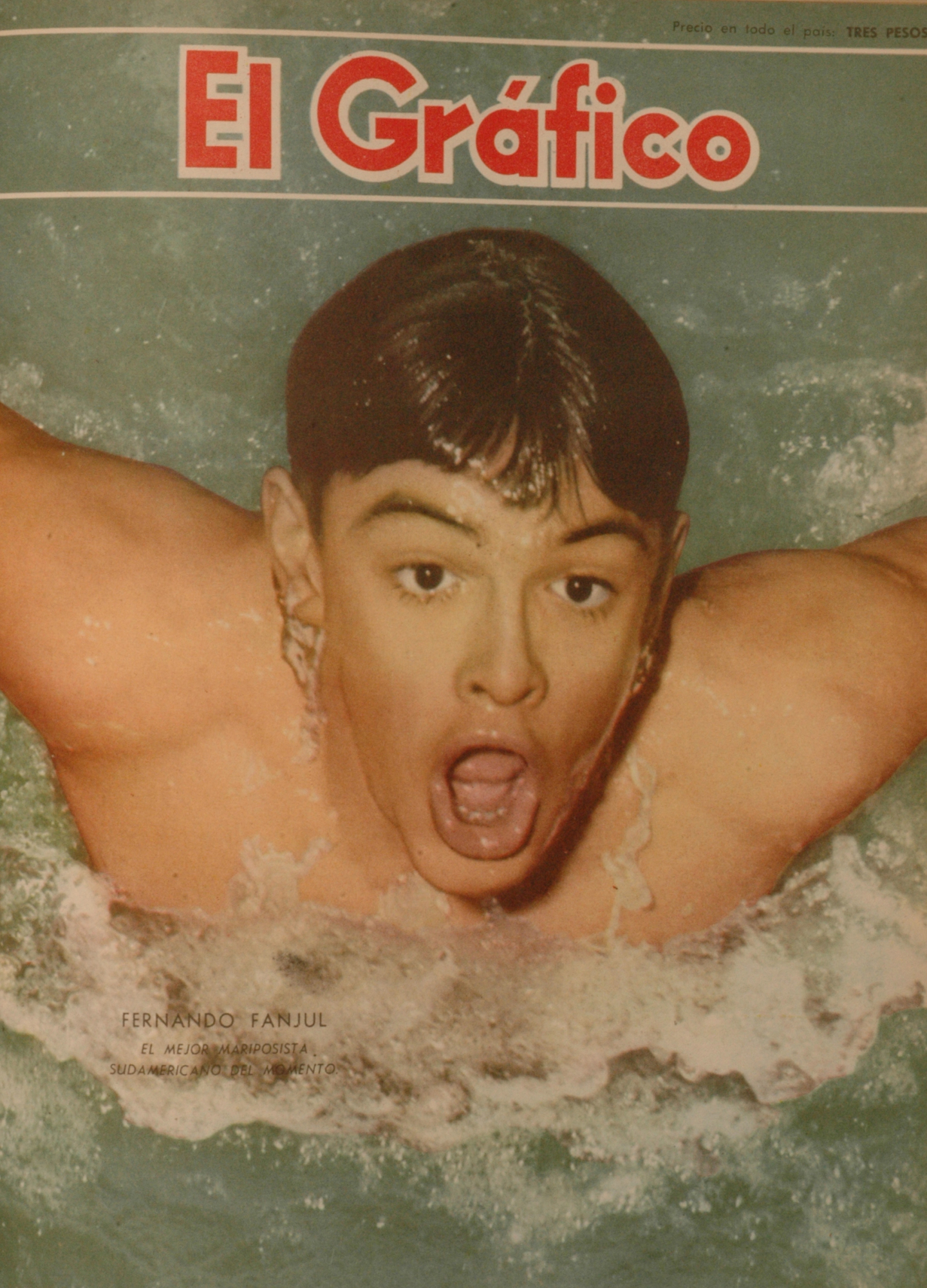

Personal information
- Born: 12 December 1941 (age 84) Buenos Aires, Argentina

Sport
- Sport: Swimming

Fernando Fanjul (born 12 December 1941) is an Argentine former swimmer. He competed in the men's 200 metre butterfly at the 1960 Summer Olympics.
