= Bert Wardrop =

British swimmer

Personal information
- Nationality: British (Scottish)
- Born: 26 May 1932 (age 94) Motherwell, Scotland

Sport
- Sport: Swimming
- Strokes: backstroke/freestyle
- Club: Motherwell AS&WPC
- College team: University of Michigan
- Coach: Matthew Mann
Medal record
Swimming
Representing Scotland
Commonwealth Games
Bronze medal – third place	1954 Vancouver	330 Yard Medley Relay

Robert Wardrop (born 26 May 1932) is a male former swimmer who competed for Great Britain and Scotland.

== Biography ==
Wardrop was a standout swimmer at the University of Michigan under Head Coach Matthew Mann. He competed in the men's 100 metre backstroke at the 1952 Summer Olympics.

He represented the Scottish team and won a bronze medal in the 330 yards medley relay event, at the 1954 British Empire and Commonwealth Games in Vancouver. He won the 1952 ASA National British Championships 110 yards backstroke title.

He is the twin brother of Jack Wardrop and the pair learned to swim at Motherwell Baths. They were members of the Motherwell Amateur Swimming & Water Polo Club.
