= Empire Pool, Vancouver =

Sporting venue in Vancouver, Canada

Empire Pool
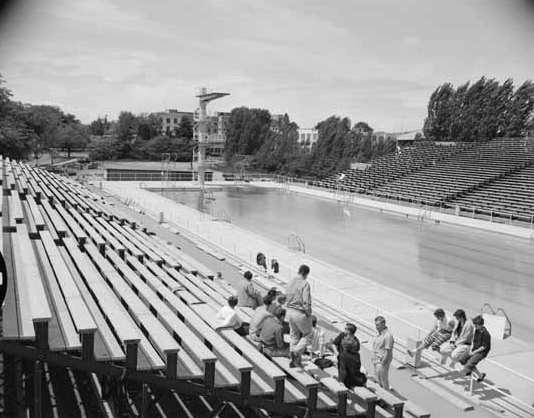
- The Empire Pool on UBC's West Point Grey campus Attribution:Province newspaper
- Location: University of British Columbia Vancouver, Canada

Construction
- Opened: start 1954; 72 years ago
- Demolished: 2014; 12 years ago

The Empire Pool was a swimming and diving facility on the University of British Columbia Vancouver Point Grey campus in Vancouver, Canada.

== History ==
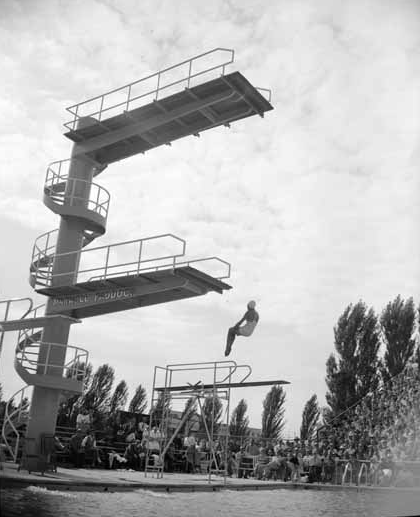
Diving at the 1954 British Empire and Commonwealth Games. Attribution:Province newspaper

The choice of swimming venue for the 1954 British Empire and Commonwealth Games suffered from budgeting issues and a bid by Los Angeles-based Paddock Inc. that came in at $140,000 less than the Beaver Construction's tender of $440,719. There were suggestions to rebuild the 1928 Nicola Street Crystal Pool before the Games committee decided that the University of British Columbia (UBC) would benefit from a new $300,000 open air pool. The pool was constructed on time to host the British Empire and Commonwealth Games aquatics programme.

The pool was opened by Prince Philip, Duke of Edinburgh and remained as the University's primary swimming venue for the swim team known as the Thunderbirds. In 1978 when the Aquatic Centre opened, it continued to host swim meetings concurrently with the Aquatic Centre.

In 2014, it no longer met modern requirements, being too shallow and requiring continual maintenance it was closed and demolished shortly after its 60th anniversary, making way for a new $38.5-million Aquatic Centre that opened in 2017.
