= Peter Duncan (swimmer) =

South African swimmer (born 1935)

Personal information
- Born: 15 April 1935 (age 91) Pretoria, South Africa

Sport
- Sport: Swimming
Medal record
Men's swimming
Representing South Africa
British Empire and Commonwealth Games
Silver medal – second place	1954 Vancouver	1650 yd freestyle
Bronze medal – third place	1954 Vancouver	4×220 yd freestyle

Peter Duncan (born 15 April 1935) is a South African former swimmer. He competed at the 1952 Summer Olympics and the 1956 Summer Olympics.
