= Dave Gillanders =

American swimmer (born 1939)

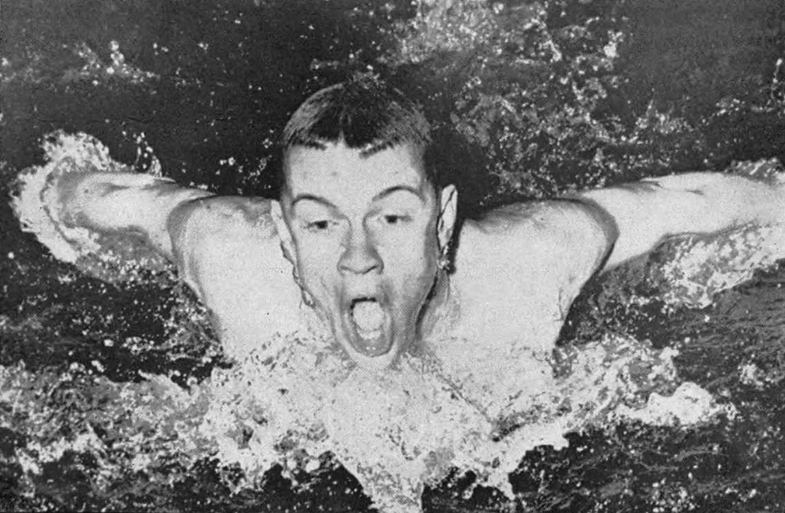
- Gillanders in 1961

Personal information
- Full name: John David Gillanders
- Nickname: "Dave"
- National team: United States
- Born: May 18, 1939 (age 87) Schenectady, New York
- Height: 5 ft 11 in (1.80 m)
- Weight: 154 lb (70 kg)

Sport
- Sport: Swimming
- Strokes: Butterfly
- Club: Detroit Athletic Club
- College team: University of Michigan
- Coach: Gus Stager
Medal record
Representing the United States
Olympic Games
Bronze medal – third place	1960 Rome	200 m butterfly
Pan American Games
Gold medal – first place	1959 Chicago	200 m butterfly
Representing Michigan
NCAA
Gold medal – first place	1959 Ithaca	Team title
Gold medal – first place	1959 Ithaca	100 yard butterfly
Gold medal – first place	1959 Ithaca	200 yard butterfly
Gold medal – first place	1959 Ithaca	400 yard medley relay

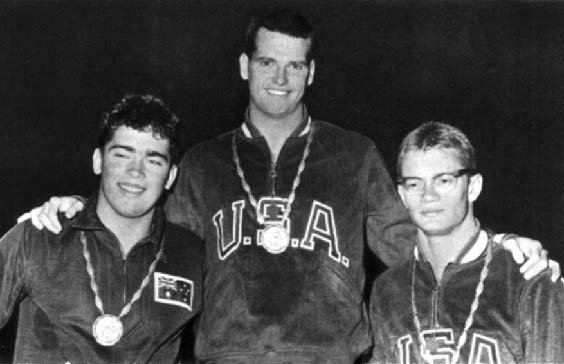
Gillanders (right) at the 1960 Olympics

John David Gillanders (born May 18, 1939) is an American competition swimmer, Olympic medalist, and former world record-holder. He still competes in masters swimming in the 75–79 age group.

== Early life ==
Originally from Schenectady, New York, Gillanders graduated from Dondero High School in Royal Oak, Michigan in 1957. While there, he earned state and national honors swimming the individual butterfly and as a member of the medley relay team. He was inducted into the Royal Oak High School Hall of Fame in 1996.

After high school, he attended the University of Michigan, where he swam for the Michigan Wolverines swimming and diving team. He won NCAA individual titles in both the 100- and 200-yard butterfly events in 1959 and 1961, and was a member of the Michigan Wolverines team that won the NCAA championship in the 400-yard medley relay in 1959. At Michigan, Gillanders earned a bachelor's degree in 1962, a master's degree in 1963, and eventually a PhD in electrical engineering in 1972. In 2004, Gillanders was elected to the University of Michigan Athletic Hall of Honor.

== International career ==
Gillanders represented the United States as a 21-year-old at the 1960 Summer Olympics in Rome, Italy. He qualified for the team by finishing second to Mike Troy at the 1960 U.S. Olympic Team Trials in the 200-meter butterfly with a time of 2:14. At the Olympics, Gillanders won a bronze medal in the 200-meter butterfly (2:15.3), again finishing behind Troy (2:12.8) and Australian Neville Hayes (2:14.6). Recounting the race, Gillanders said he was "quite disappointed" with the result because he was over a second slower than his trials time. He also swam for the winning U.S. team in the preliminary heats of the men's 4×100-meter medley relay, but did not receive a medal because prelim swimmers were not awarded medals for their contributions at the time. Notably, the prelim team Gillanders was a part of broke the world record, but it was later broken by the starting American team in the final.

In addition to his Olympic medal, Gillanders won a gold medal at the 1959 Pan American Games in the 200-meter butterfly, beating eventual Olympic champion Mike Troy.

== Later life ==
Gillanders was a professor of electrical engineering at Texas A&I University (now Texas A&M University–Kingsville) and Arkansas State University before retiring after over 30 years of teaching. He still continues to swim in U.S. Masters Swimming competitions where has been in the top ten of his age group for most of the last 35 years. In 1986, he set a Masters world record in the short course 100-meter butterfly for the 45–49 age group. Most recently, he placed in the top ten in the 200-meter backstroke (short course) in 2011, and in the top ten of several events during the 2010 USMS Spring National Championships in May and in the Summer Championships in August.

== See also ==
- List of Olympic medalists in swimming (men)
- List of University of Michigan alumni
- World record progression 4 × 100 metres medley relay
