= Daphne Wilkinson =

English swimmer (1932–2023)

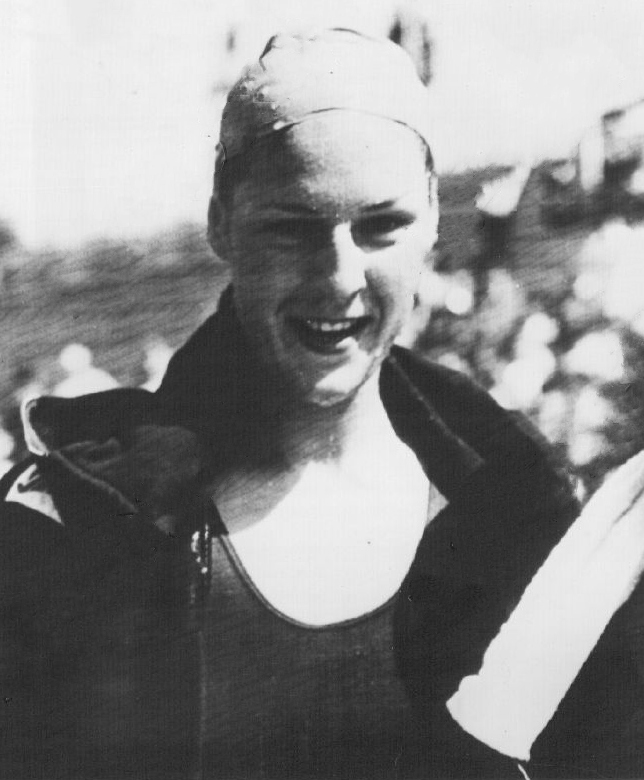
- Wilkinson at the 1952 Olympics

Personal information
- Full name: Daphne Rose Wilkinson
- Born: 21 April 1932 Birmingham, England
- Died: 24 December 2023 (aged 91)

Sport
- Sport: Swimming
Medal record
Representing England
British Empire and Commonwealth Games
Bronze medal – third place	1954 Vancouver	4×110 yd freestyle

Daphne Rose Wilkinson (later Harrison, 21 April 1932 – 24 December 2023) was an English freestyle swimmer and Olympian.

== Biography ==
Wilkinson was born in Birmingham, England on 21 April 1932. She competed in the 400 metre event at the 1952 Summer Olympics in Helsinki, Finland. She broke the world record during the freestyle heats, but came 11th in the semi-finals and failed to reach the final.

She won a bronze medal in the 4×110 yard relay at the 1954 British Empire and Commonwealth Games representing England. She won the 1951 ASA National Championship 220 yards freestyle title and three ASA National Championship 440 yards freestyle titles in 1950, 1951 and 1952.

After retiring, Wilkinson taught swimming in Kenilworth. She was inducted into Coventry’s Hall of Fame and participated in a parade in honour of former Olympians in Coventry in 2008.

Wilkinson died on 24 December 2023, at the age of 91.
