= Thomas Welsh (swimmer) =

British swimmer

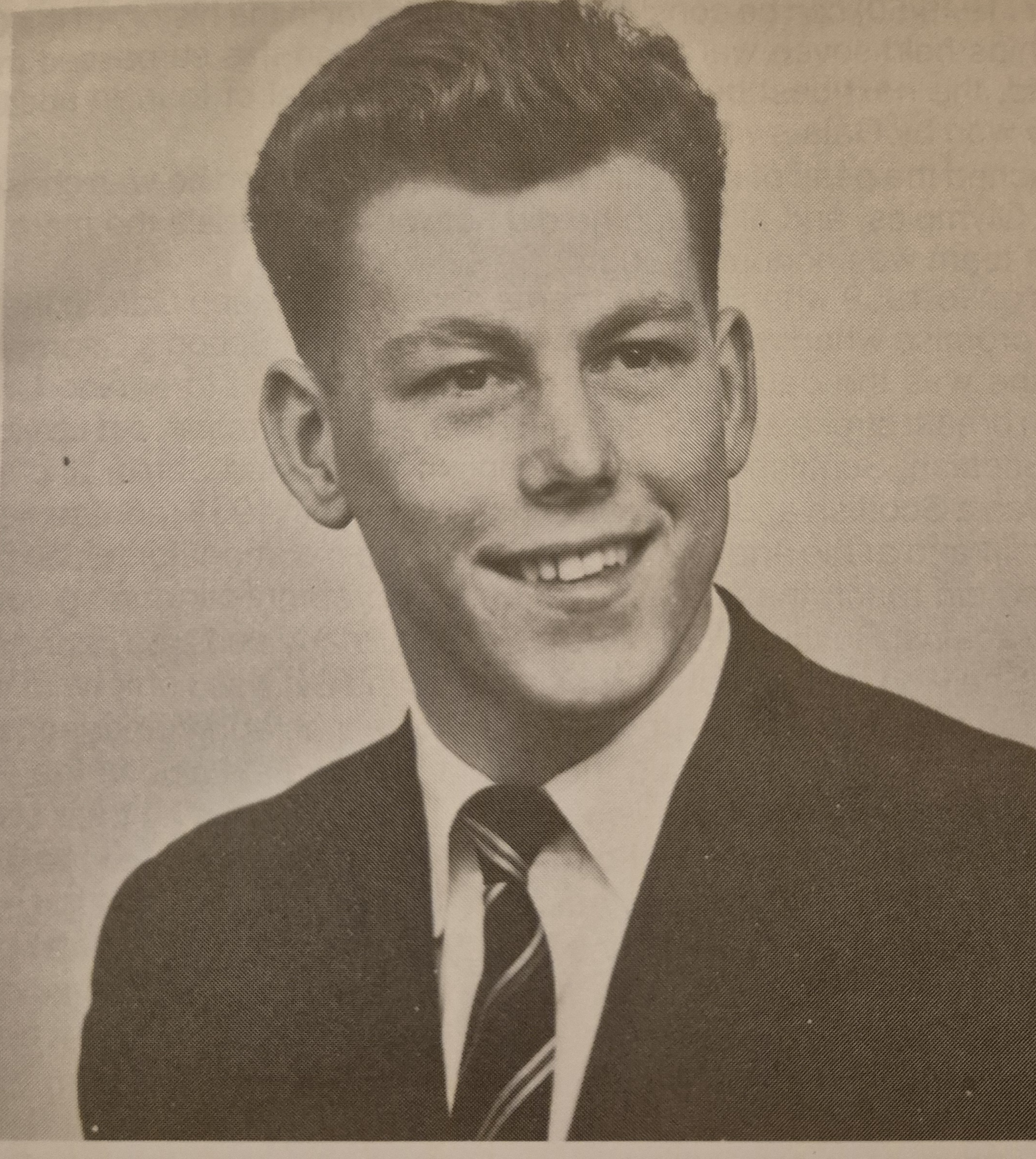

Personal information
- Full name: Thomas Douglas Welsh
- Nationality: Scottish
- Born: 20 April 1933 Galashiels, Scotland
- Died: 19 November 2021 (aged 88) Johannesburg, South Africa

Sport
- Sport: Swimming
- Strokes: Freestyle

Thomas Douglas Welsh (20 April 1933 – 19 November 2021) was a Scottish swimmer from Galashiels in the Scottish Borders. He competed in two events at the 1952 Summer Olympics. He died in Johannesburg on 19 November 2021, at the age of 88.

== Early life and swimming ==
Swimmer Thomas Douglas Welsh (Doug) was the son of Bank Street newsagents Reid and Beatrice Welsh and was educated at the Burgh Primary School and Galashiels Academy.

Doug learned to swim aged 11. He quickly established himself on the circuit by winning Border, Eastern and Scotland Junior Championships. The 110-yard and 200-yard freestyle were his preferred events

At the age of 16 he attended the British Swimming Championships in Blackpool in 1949 along with teammate Betty Turner.

Betty won the ladies 110 yards event and Doug carried off the junior 110 yards title.

Although a junior, his winning time placed him within the top six fastest UK swimmers at that time.

On returning to Galashiels, they received an outstanding homecoming welcome and both were carried aloft through the town, followed by the Town Band.

== Later life and swimming ==
Thomas represented Scotland and Great Britain in swimming and water polo between 1948 and 1958.

Thomas became Scottish national champion in the 50 yard freestyle event in 1951,1952,1953,1955 and 100 yard freestyle champion in 1955.

While in the RAF he became European combined armed services freestyle 110 yards and 220 yards champion between 1950 and 1952.

During this time, he also represented Wales at basketball while he was based at St Athens.

The pinnacle of his career came in 1952 when he was selected to represent Great Britain at the Helsinki Olympic Games. He reached the semi-final in the 110 yards freestyle and, as part of the 2x200m relay team, was 6th in the 220 yards final.

He was selected to represent GB again at the games in Melbourne in 1956, however due to his final physiotherapy exams at Loughborough University, he was unable to travel

Doug emigrated to South Africa in 1965 pursuing a successful career in pharmaceuticals.

In 1995 he became a founder member of the British Olympians Association and was elected South African representative of the organisation.

In 2007 he was inducted into the Scottish Borders Sporting Hall of Fame.
