= Bob Muir (swim coach) =

American swimmer and coach (1898-1997)

- Muir during his years as Williams College Swim and Dive Coach

Biographical details
- Born: April 7, 1898; Boston, Massachusetts, U.S.
- Died: October 30, 1997 (aged 99); Williamstown, Mass., U.S.

Playing career
- 1908-1919: Brookline Swimming Club; Boston Swimming Association; Coached by Matthew Mann
- Positions: Breaststroke; Backstroke

Coaching career (HC unless noted)
- 1921-1930: M.I.T. Boston University; Boston Swimming Association
- 1930-1936: Harvard University; Freshmen and Varsity
- 1936-1966: Williams College
- 1956: U.S. Olympic Head Coach

Head coaching record
- Overall: 185-44-4 (Williams College)

Accomplishments and honors

Awards
- International Swimming Hall of Fame (1989); National Collegiate & Scholastic Trophy (68); Samuel-Muir Pool (Williams College)

Robert Bruce Muir (April 7, 1898 – October 30, 1997) was an American competitive swimmer and swimming coach, best known for coaching the swim team at Williams College from 1935-1966. He was a New England champion in both breaststroke and backstroke, and won the AAU 1-mile swim in Boston in September, 1919. He coached swimming at Boston College from around 1921-1930, coached swimming at Harvard University from around 1930-1935, and was the Head U.S. Men's Olympic team coach for the 1956 Melbourne Olympics. In recognition of his coaching achievements, he was a 1966 recipient of the College Swimming Coaches Association of America's (CSCAA) National Collegiate and Scholastic Swimming Trophy, the Association's highest honor. In a rare distinction, he became a member of the International Swimming Hall of Fame as an outstanding coach in 1989.

== Early life and swimming ==
Hall of Fame Coach Matthew Mann II

Robert Muir was born in Boston, Massachusetts on April 7, 1898, the son of John and Ann Simmons Muir. He attended Brookline High School and began swimming for Brookline Swimming Club by the age of 10, where he was coached by Hall of Fame inductee Matthew Mann, who would later become a long serving and highly accomplished swim coach for the University of Michigan. During his early years, Muir captured nineteen AAU New England Championships in backstroke and breaststroke events. A particularly accomplished breaststroker at 19, Muir won the 1917 YMCA National Championship in breaststroke while serving as the Captain of the Boston Swimming Association. Muir set a new national age-group breaststroke record for YMCA competition, which he held for seven years. According to his Obituary in the Berkshire Eagle, Muir may have briefly attended Boston University where he first joined the Boston Swimming Association.

== Marriage ==
Around the age of 20, Muir married Boston native Ione Louise Casavent, an accomplished fellow swimmer, in 1919. Cassavant, who had swum with Muir at the Brookline Swim Club, was a 1920 graduate of the Boston School of Business Administration, and held nine New England swimming championships between 1917-1923. Like her husband Bob, Ione also coached and competed for the Boston Swimming Association. Remaining active as a coach, she ran a girl's swimming program for the Williamstown community, at the Williams College pool from 1937-1980. From 1923-1973, as an accomplished administrator in the swimming community, she was a Secretary and Chair of the New England Swimming Committee, and served on the U.S. Olympic Committee after 1934.

From around 1918-1919, Muir served with the U.S. Navy, achieving the rank of Chief Petty Officer.

== One mile championship ==
On September 6, 1919, representing the United States Shipping Board, Muir won the New England AAU Swimming Championship for the one-mile distance held in greater Boston's Charles River with a time of 28 minutes, 41.6 seconds, then considered an AAU New England record. Interestingly, Muir's wife Ione Louise placed third in the mile and a half women's Championship sponsored by the Boston American in the Charles River on the same day, with a time of 1 hour, 1 second. On a rough day on the Charles, 27 of the 60 women starters finished the race.

== Coaching ==
Beginning in 1921, Muir coached the swim teams at Boston University and the Massachusetts Institute of Technology, often conducting practice at the Boston YMCA. Beginning around 1930, he coached Harvard University's Varsity diving and swimming teams, taught swimming at Harvard, and coached the Harvard Freshman swimming team, where one of his swimmers was future President John F. Kennedy. Muir left Harvard and the Boston area around 1936 to become a Head Coach for Williams College.

From 1936-1966, Muir served as Head Coach for the Williams College swim and dive team in Williamstown, Massachusetts, amassing a record of 185-44-4. With an impressive series of wins, twenty-seven of his teams never lost a regular season dual meet, and he had nine teams lose only once in regular season competition. With an outstanding record of regional wins, with Muir as Head Coach, the Williams Swim team won the New England Championships seventeen times. Though he officially retired as Williams Coach in 1966, he returned at various intervals to assist with the team into his 90's. Muir also coached divers during his time at Williams, coaching diver Felix Grossman from 1952-1956. Grossman, was an active U.S. Master's Diver who was instrumental in getting Muir recognized by the International Swimming Hall of Fame in 1989, as at the time Muir was the only U.S. Men's Head Olympic Coach that had not been admitted.

=== U.S. Olympic coach ===
In 1956, Muir was made the Head Coach of the U.S. Men's Olympic team for the 1956 Melbourne Olympics. In 1948 and 1952, he had served as a U.S. Men's Olympic Swim team Assistant Coach.

During summers from 1930-1973, he taught children swimming at Long Island New York's Lawrence Beach Club along with his wife Ione, who also coached a girls community swim program at Williams College. Muir served as both a swimming instructor, and an Athletic Director at the Lawrence Club. Estimates of the number of children he worked with range as high as 30,000.

=== Service to the swimming community ===
In competitive meets, Muir was responsible for assigning different swimmers different lane assignments, based on their qualifying times. This approach, known as the Muir system is still used today. Generally, today the faster swimmers are given the center lanes. Muir was also responsible for coaching and instructing his freestyle swimmers to modify the position of each arm as it entered the water to reduce drag, and increase efficiency.

Muir served as President of the College Swimming Coaches Association for a pair of terms. He served often as an official at important competitions prior to the Olympics, and at National meets. Muir ran classes and clinics for both swimmers and coaches during his career and wrote and published over forty articles on swimming.

Muir died at Sweet Brook nursing home in Williamstown, Massachusetts on October 30, 1997 at the age of 99. For seven decades, he had been a long serving member of Williams Lodge, and of the Richard A. Reuther American Legion Post 152. He was survived by a sister, a niece, and a grandson. He was predeceased by his wife of sixty-five years, former swimmer, swim coach, and swimming administrator, Ione Louise Casavent on February 15, 1985. A funeral for Robert was held Monday morning, November 3, at the Sherman Burbank Memorial Chapel, and he was buried at the Cemetery at Williams College as had been his wife Ione.

=== Honors ===
In 1989, Muir became a member of the International Swimming Hall of Fame. The College Swimming Coaches Association (CSCAA) awarded Muir the National Collegiate and Scholastic Swimming Trophy, their highest honor, in 1968.

Division III New England Swimming created the Robert B. Muir Award in his honor. The award is given to a collegiate swimmer in his Senior year in New England who has earned the most career points. The Robert B. Muir Pool at Williams College was named in his honor, and dedicated as the Samuelson-Muir Pool in 2000.
