= 1954 British Empire and Commonwealth Games =

Multi-sport event in Vancouver, Canada

V British Empire and Commonwealth Games
- Host city: Vancouver, Canada
- Nations: 24
- Athletes: 662
- Events: 91
- Opening: 30 July 1954
- Closing: 7 August 1954
- Opened by: Earl Alexander of Tunis
- Closed by: Prince Philip, Duke of Edinburgh
- Athlete's Oath: Bill Parnell
- Main venue: Empire Stadium

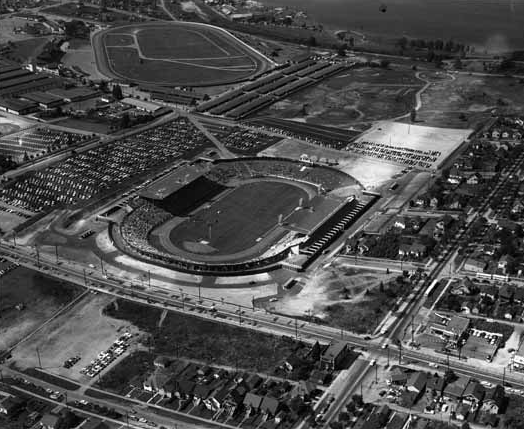
Empire Stadium Vancouver July 1954

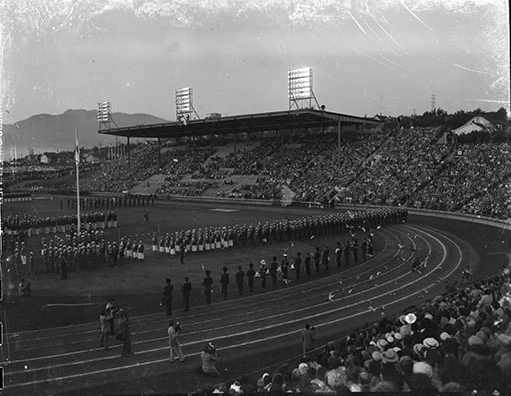
Opening ceremony. Attribution:Province newspaper

The 1954 British Empire and Commonwealth Games were held in Vancouver, British Columbia, from 30 July to 7 August 1954. This was the fifth edition of the event that would eventually become known as the Commonwealth Games, the second post-war Games, the second Canadian Games after the inaugural event in Hamilton and the first event since the name change from British Empire Games took effect in 1952. Other bids to stage the Games were received from Toronto, Montreal and Hamilton.

The main venue was the Empire Stadium, which had been specifically constructed for the games at the cost of £500,000. Work on the 25,000 seated stadium started in October 1953 and the keys were handed over to Stan Smith (General chairman of the games) on 12 July 1954.

The games were attended by 24 nations and 662 competitors. It was the first time that the games gained a television audience, when CBC and NBC transmitted pictures to an estimated 100 million North American viewers. Recordings of the games were also shown on the BBC Television Service, beginning a consistent association between the BBC and the Commonwealth Games which only ended in 2026.

It was at these games that the "Miracle Mile" took place between Roger Bannister and John Landy at the Empire Stadium. This was the first time these two (and at that time the only two) sub-four-minute mile runners appeared in the same race, and also the first time two runners broke four minutes in the same race. On the same afternoon, Jim Peters, the holder of the world best time for the marathon, entered the stadium 17 minutes ahead of his nearest rival, but collapsed on his final lap, and never completed the race.

== Venues ==
- Opening and closing ceremonies: Empire Stadium, Hastings Park
- Aquatics: Empire Pool, University of British Columbia, West Point Grey
- Athletics: Empire Stadium
- Boxing: Exhibition Forum
- Cycling (track): Empire Oval (Broadway Bowl)
- Cycling (road): 1155 East Broadway
- Fencing: Lord Byng School Gym, West Point Grey
- Lawn bowls: West Point Grey Bowling Club, New Westminster Lawn Bowling Club
- Rowing: Vedder Canal, Chilliwack
- Weightlifting: Exhibition Garden, Hastings Park
- Wrestling: Kerrisdale Arena
- Athletes' Village: University of British Columbia, West Point Grey

== Participating teams ==
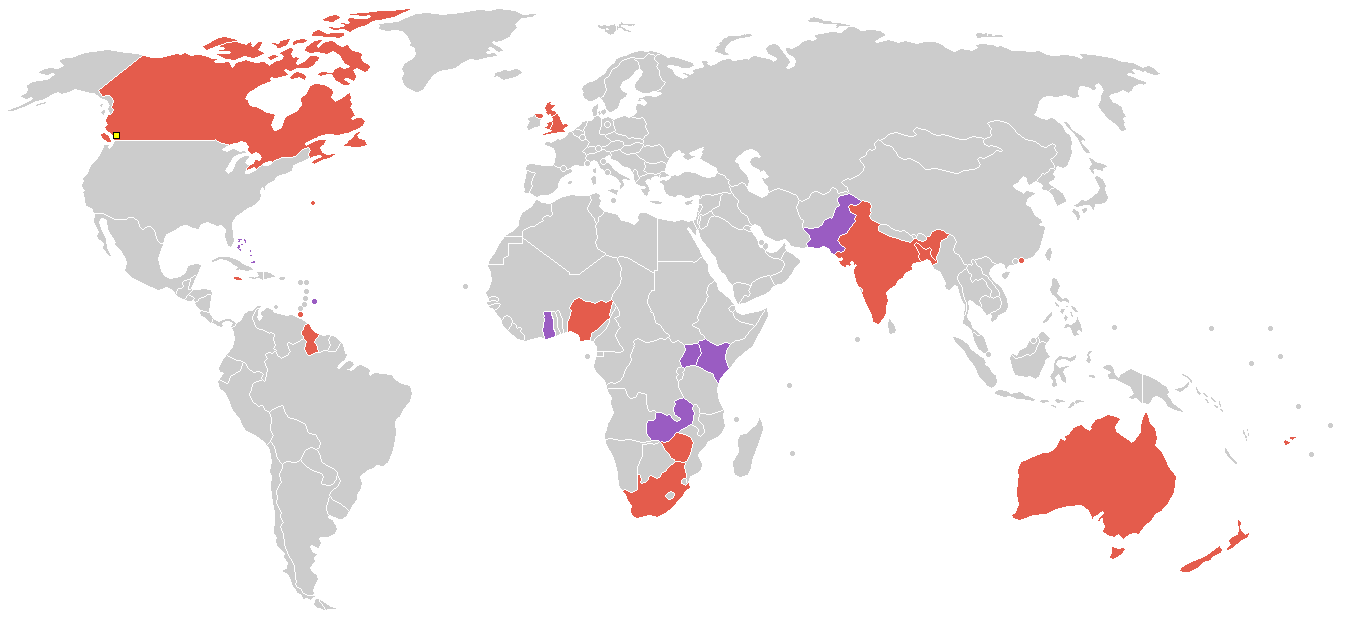
Countries that participated

24 teams were represented at the 1954 British Empire and Commonwealth Games.

- Australia
- Bahamas: first appearance
- Barbados: first appearance
- Bermuda
- British Guiana
- Canada (host)
- England
- Fiji
- Gold Coast: first appearance
- Hong Kong
- India
- Jamaica
- Kenya: first appearance
- New Zealand
- Nigeria
- Northern Ireland
- Northern Rhodesia: first appearance
- Pakistan: first appearance
- Scotland
- South Africa
- Southern Rhodesia
- Trinidad and Tobago
- Uganda: first appearance
- Wales

== Medal table ==
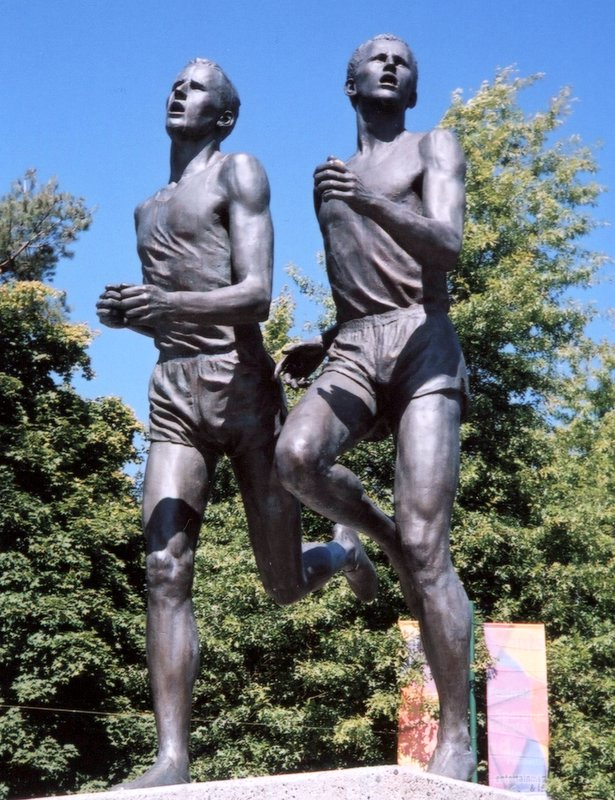
Statue in Vancouver commemorating the "Miracle Mile" between Roger Bannister and John Landy

Medals won by nation, ranked and sortable
Rank	Nation	Gold	Silver	Bronze	Total
1	England	23	24	20	67
2	Australia	20	11	17	48
3	South Africa	16	6	13	35
4	Canada*	9	20	14	43
5	New Zealand	7	7	5	19
6	Scotland	6	2	5	13
7	Southern Rhodesia	2	2	1	5
8	Trinidad and Tobago	2	2	0	4
9	Northern Ireland	2	1	0	3
10	Northern Rhodesia	1	4	3	8
11	Nigeria	1	3	3	7
12	Pakistan	1	3	2	6
13	Wales	1	1	5	7
14	Jamaica	1	0	0	1
15	Barbados	0	1	0	1
15	Hong Kong	0	1	0	1
15	Uganda	0	1	0	1
18	British Guiana	0	0	1	1
Totals (18 entries)		92	89	89	270

== Sports ==
- Aquatics ()
  - Diving ()
  - Swimming ()
- Athletics ()
- Boxing ()
- Cycling ()
- Fencing ()
- Lawn bowls ()
- Rowing ()
- Weightlifting ()
- Wrestling ()

Preceded by Auckland	British Empire and Commonwealth Games; Vancouver; V British Empire and Commonwealth Games	Succeeded by Cardiff
