= Mary Anne Marchino =

American swimmer (1938–2021)

- Marchino during her competition years

Personal information
- Full name: Mary Anne Marchino -Witchger
- National team: United States
- Born: January 27, 1938 Indianapolis, Indiana, U.S.
- Died: January 29, 2021 (aged 83) Charleston, South Carolina
- Education: Purdue University (B.S. 1960)
- Occupations: Kindergarten teacher Craft business owner, Homemaker
- Height: 5 ft 7.5 in (1.715 m)
- Weight: 134 lb (61 kg)
- Spouse: Eugene Wolf Witchger (1962)
- Children: 5

Sport
- Sport: Swimming
- Event: 100, 200 backstroke
- Strokes: Backstroke
- Club: Indianapolis Athletic Club; Lafayette Swim Club
- Coach: Jim C. W. Clark (Indianapolis A. C.); Richard Papenguth (Lafayette SC); Stan Tinkham (Olympics)

Mary Anne Marchino (January 27, 1938 – January 29, 2021), also known by her married name Mary Anne Witchger after her 1962 marriage, was an American competition swimmer who competed for the Indianapolis Athletic Club and represented the United States at the 1956 Summer Olympics in Melbourne, Australia, where she competed in the women's 100-meter backstroke. An Indiana State Champion in backstroke, she graduated Purdue University in 1962 where she swam for the Lafayette Swim Club under Hall of Fame swim Coach Richard O. Papenguth, who also coached the Purdue Men's team. She married Eugene Wolf Witchger in June, 1962, and the couple raised five children, living in several American cities, and international locations that included London, England, and Puerto Rico.

== Early life, swimming ==
Mary Anne Marchino was born January 27, 1938, to Mr. and Mrs. Elmer F. Marchino in Indianapolis, Indiana. Her father Elmer supported the swimming community both at the local level in Indianapolis and nationally as well. Mary Anne attended St. Agnes Academy, an all girl's Catholic School in Indianapolis, where she graduated in 1956. St. Agnes, originally founded as a boarding school, operated through 1970.

Mary Anne began her swim training at the Riviera Country Club, and later competed representing the strong program at the Indianapolis Athletic Club where she was trained and managed by the well-known coach James C. W. Clark of Terra Haute, Indiana. She was a recipient of All American honors during her high school years in 1954, and held a Mid-West area record in the 100-yard backstroke.

Mary Anne's high school era coach James C. W. Clark coached swimming at Indiana's Butler University where he also competed, and began coaching at the Indianapolis Athletic Club prior to WWII, then coached swimming at the Great Lakes Naval Training Station during the War. He then returned to coach the Indianapolis Club in 1946, with his teams winning the Indiana State Championship in 1951, as well as the Indianapolis City Championship in the same year. He continued coaching at the Indianapolis Athletic Club through 1957, then coached at Westwood Country Club. Including Marchino, Clark mentored three Olympians during his career, which included backstroker Frank McKinney who competed with Marchino in the 1956 Olympics and won a gold medal in the 1960 Olympics. Mary Anne first met her future husband while swimming for the Indianapolis Athletic Club.

== 1956 Melbourne Olympics ==
At the early August 1956 Olympic swimming trials in Detroit, Marchino placed third, or according to several records tied for second in the 100-meter backstroke with a time of 1:15.2, qualifying her for the U.S. Olympic team. Not surprisingly, in a close finish, her backstroke rival Carin Cone of Ridgewood, New Jersey placed first with a time of 1:15.0, and Maureen Murphy of Portland placed second with a time of 1:15.2. Marchino trained twice a day for several months in preparation for the Olympics with Olympic Coach Stan Tinkham in Los Angeles at the Olympic Stadium and the Los Angeles Athletic Club.

On December 3, 1956, at the 1956 Melbourne Olympics, Marchino competed in the qualifying heats of the women's 100-meter backstroke under Head U.S. women's Olympic swim Coach Stan Tinkham. Tinkham, an International Swimming Hall of Fame inductee, coached the Walter Reed Swim Club and the Northern Virginia Aquatic Club. Marchino posted a time of 1:16.2 for the 100-meter backstroke, and finished in 15th place overall, placing her about 3 seconds away from contending for a medal. In a very close finish for the medal contenders, Judith Grinham of Great Britain won the gold with a time of 1:12.9, American rival Carin Cone won the silver with a time of 1:12.9, and Margaret Edwards of Great Britain won the bronze with a time of 1:13.1.

=== Purdue University ===
Marchino graduated Purdue University in Lafayette, Indiana, in August, 1960 where she swam with the Lafayette swim Club and was a member of Kappa Alpha Theta Sorority and Psi Iota Xi Sorority dedicated to community service and philanthropy. At Purdue, she received a Bachelor of Science in Home Economics. While training with the Lafayette Swim Club, she swam with a number of other Purdue University women who were trained and managed by International Swimming Hall of Fame Inductee, Coach Richard O. Papenguth. Papenguth was considered by swimming historians to be one of the earlier swimming coaches to give long and intense practices to his women's teams, that included demanding interval training. As a result, his Lafayette women's teams were national champions in 1951 and 1952. Marchino may have taken courses at Indiana University in 1962.

In 1958 during her collegiate years, Mary Anne won Indiana State titles in both the 100 and 200-yard backstroke events. In 1957, she won the Indiana state title in the 200-yard backstroke with a time of 2:30.8. In high-profile National American Athletic Union backstroke competitions, Marchino placed just behind the era's greatest backstroker Carin Cone seven times, including in the 1956 Olympic trials in Detroit.

=== Marriage ===
Marchino married Eugene Witchger on June 10, 1962, at St. Joan of Arc Catholic Church in Indianapolis. Witchger was a graduate of the Carnegie Institute of Technology. Mary Anne first met Eugene while swimming for the Indianapolis Athletic Club. Eugene and Mary Anne moved several times after their marriage, living first in Pittsburgh where Witchger could complete his education, then in Indianapolis, Indiana, then Roanoke, Virginia, New Canaan, Connecticut, London, England, San Juan, Puerto Rico, and Kiawah Island, South Carolina.

=== Careers, avocations ===
Marchino-Witchger was a Kindergarten teacher and was the owner of a craft business. For avocations she enjoyed needlework, painting and making baskets. She was an enthusiastic golfer after her swimming career.

Mary Anne died January 29, 2021, at the age of 83 in greater Charleston, South Carolina. She was survived by her husband Eugene Wolf Witzger, five children, and many great-grandchildren. On February 13, 2021, a memorial service was held at Holy Spirit Catholic Church where she had been a member for many years.
