= Huntingford =

Huntingford may refer to:

== People ==
- Felicity Huntingford (born 1948), British aquatic ecologist
- George Huntingford (1748–1832), English bishop
- George Wynn Brereton Huntingford (1901–1978), English linguist, anthropologist and historian
- Henry Huntingford (1787–1867), English clergyman and writer
- Joseph G. Huntingford (1926–1994), Maltese architect, engineer and planner
- Patricia Huntingford (born 1940), Australian swimmer

== Places ==
- Huntingford, Ontario, Canada, a community in East Zorra-Tavistock township
- Huntingford, Dorset, England, a hamlet in Gillingham parish
- Huntingford, Gloucestershire, England, a hamlet
