= The Green School for Girls =

The Green School for Girls (TGSG)

Location
- Busch Corner; Isleworth, Greater London, TW7 5BB; England
- Coordinates: 51.47911°N 0.32492°W

Information
- Type: Academy
- Motto: Matthew 5:16 “Let your light shine”
- Religious affiliation: Church of England
- Established: 1796
- Founder: Rev. William Drake
- Department for Education URN: 139989 Tables
- Ofsted: Reports
- Head teacher: Mr Lee Thomas
- Gender: Girls
- Age: 11 to 18
- Enrolment: 900~
- Website: http://www.tgsgirls.com

The Green School for Girls is in an all-girls secondary school and sixth form with academy status, located in Isleworth, west London, England. It also has a new boys school across London Road.

== History ==
The Green School for Girls was originally a Sunday school for girls founded in 1796. It educated girls rejected from the heavily oversubscribed Blue School (now Isleworth and Syon School). The name supposedly originates from the fact that the school away gave free green clothes for the girls to wear as a uniform. In 1906 the Duke of Northumberland whose estate was Syon Park donated a new building at Busch Corner in London Road, Isleworth, which is still occupied by the school. The junior school closed in 1919. Some of the buildings suffered damage during the Blitz on three separate occasions. The school campus underwent some renovations and additions over the years but still largely occupies the original buildings.

The school's mission has always been for the children to go to school in a friendly and safe environment.

== House system ==
The Green School for Girls splits girls into five different houses from Year 7 to Year 11; each house is named after a tree and has a distinct colour.

- Beeches - Red
- Chestnuts - Green
- Elms - Blue
- Oaks - Yellow
- Willows - Orange

== Notable former pupils ==
- Sophia Myles, actress

=== Greens Grammar School ===
- Tessa Bonner (1951-2008), soprano
- Margaret Edwards, swimmer who won the bronze in the 1956 Olympic 100m backstroke in Melbourne
- Gladys Mitchell, best-selling author

me
