= Sophia Myles =

English actress

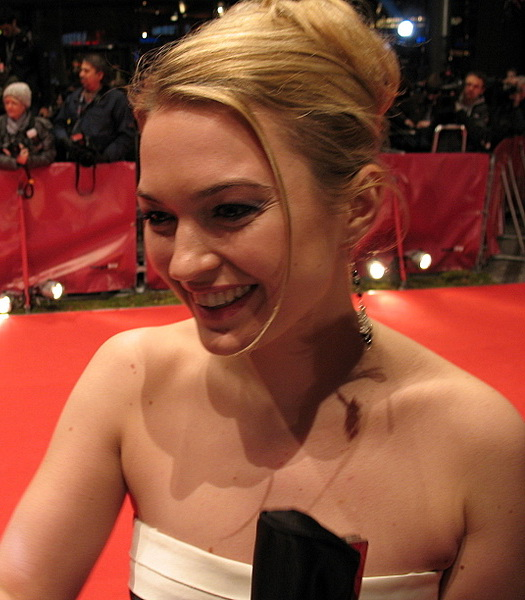
- Myles at the 2007 Berlinale Film Festival
- Born: 1979 or 1980 (age 46–47); Hammersmith, London, England, United Kingdom
- Occupation: Actress
- Years active: 1996–present
- Partner: James Bell
- Children: 1

Sophia Myles (/səˈfaɪ.ə/) is an English actress. She is best known in film for portraying Lady Penelope Creighton-Ward in Thunderbirds (2004), Isolde in Tristan & Isolde (2006), Darcy in Transformers: Age of Extinction (2014), Erika in Underworld (2003) and Underworld: Evolution (2006) and Freya in Outlander (2008).

Initially hoping to study philosophy at University of Cambridge, for which she secured a place, Myles instead turned to acting after television writer Julian Fellowes saw her perform in a school play, casting her in his series The Prince and the Pauper (1996). After this, Myles continued to receive work in films such as Mansfield Park (1999), From Hell (2001) and The Abduction Club (2002), but her breakthrough role came in the form of Erika in Underworld (2003) before she won the role of Lady Penelope Creighton-Ward in Thunderbirds (2004).

Myles moved to Hollywood where she played the main role of Isolde in the romantic film Tristan & Isolde (2006) before appearing in films including Underworld: Evolution (2006), Art School Confidential (2006), Dracula (2006), Hallam Foe (2007), Outlander (2008), The Damned (2013), Transformers: Age of Extinction (2014) and Blackwood (2015).

Myles later has also received critical acclaim for her television work, particularly as Madame de Pompadour in the Doctor Who episode "The Girl in the Fireplace" (2006), Beth Turner in Moonlight (2007–2008), Beth Bailey in Spooks (2010) and Rebecca Bishop in A Discovery of Witches (2018–2021).

Myles won a BAFTA for Best Actress for her role as Kate in Hallam Foe (2007) and was also nominated for a BIFA at the British Independent Film Awards for the same film. She has also won several other awards at various other film festivals across the world.

== Early life ==
Sophia Myles was born in Hammersmith, London, England. Her mother, Jane (née Allan), works in educational publishing, and her father, Peter R. Myles, was a retired Church of England vicar in Isleworth, West London. Her paternal grandmother was Russian, and Myles refers to herself as "half-Welsh, half-Russian". She grew up in Notting Hill and attended Fox Primary School. At the age of 11, she moved with her family to Isleworth and attended The Green School. Following success at her A Levels she secured a place at the University of Cambridge to study philosophy, but chose to pursue an acting career after being spotted by Julian Fellowes in a school play and shortly after had a small role in his television production of The Prince and the Pauper in 1996.

== Career ==
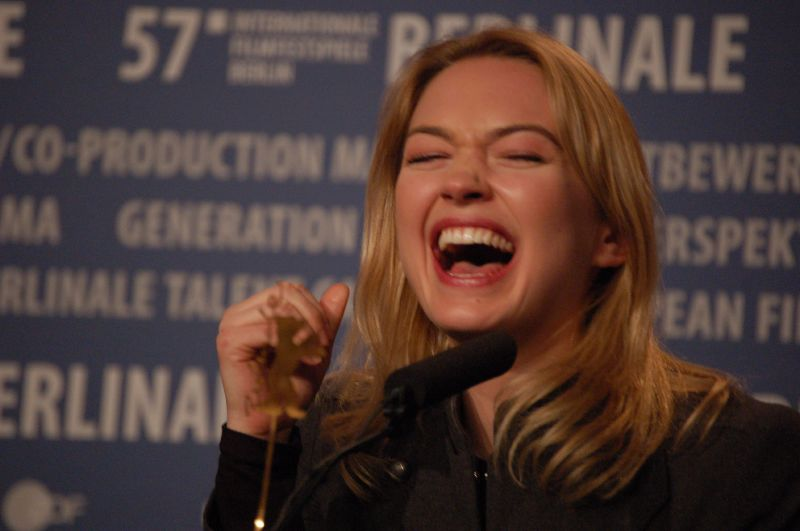
Myles at Berlinale, 2007

Since 1996, Myles has appeared in a number of films and television productions. Following her success in The Prince and the Pauper, Myles made her film debut in Mansfield Park (1999) and had a small role in Guest House Paradiso (1999). After roles in the television series Heartbeat and Foyle's War, Myles starred as Victoria Abberline in the thriller film From Hell (2001) alongside Johnny Depp, with Myles playing his wife. Myles played a main role in the comedy-romance film The Abduction Club (2002) before then playing the role of Erika in the 2003 vampire film Underworld with Kate Beckinsale, and reprised the character in its sequel, Underworld: Evolution (2006).

In 2003, she also starred in the thriller Out of Bounds and played Lady Penelope in Thunderbirds (2004), the film version of the classic television show of the same name. Myles initially had the choice to star in either Thunderbirds or Troy but she chose the former as she said "Lady Penelope is such an iconic character". In 2005, Myles starred in the two-part war drama miniseries Colditz with Damian Lewis and Tom Hardy. In 2006, she co-starred as Isolde in the epic romantic drama Tristan & Isolde opposite James Franco and produced by Ridley Scott.

Myles appeared as Madame de Pompadour in the 2006 Doctor Who episode "The Girl in the Fireplace", which is often referred to as one of the best episodes of the series. The episode was nominated for a Nebula Award and won the 2007 Hugo Award for Best Dramatic Presentation, Short Form. Myles also had roles as Gwenda Halliday in the British detective drama Agatha Christie's Marple: Sleeping Murder and Sophie Amsden in American thriller Covert One: The Hades Factor on television before starring in the 2006 comedy film Art School Confidential. Also in 2006, she appeared as Lucy Westenra in a BBC adaptation of Dracula.

In 2007, Myles was cast as Beth Turner in the popular CBS supernatural television drama Moonlight, a role she would play until the show's end in 2008. Moonlight won Best New Drama in the 2007 People's Choice Awards. Myles was nominated for the Best Actress Award in 2007 for her role as Kate in Hallam Foe from the British Independent Film Award committee, for which she also received a BAFTA Scotland Award. In 2008, she played Freya, the daughter of John Hurt's character, in the sci-fi action epic Outlander with Jim Caviezel and Ron Perlman.

After having a cameo role in the American comedy film Etienne! in 2009, in 2010 Myles joined the cast of Spooks, a BBC television series about a counter-terrorism unit in MI5, for its ninth series, playing Beth Bailey. Myles then had a starring role as Lauren in the 2013 American horror film The Damned with Peter Facinelli and Nathalia Ramos. In 2014, Myles starred as geologist Darcy Tirrel opposite Mark Wahlberg and Stanley Tucci in the sci-fi action blockbuster Transformers: Age of Extinction which was directed by Michael Bay and produced by Steven Spielberg.

Later in 2014, Myles starred as Rachel in the psychological horror film Blackwood before going on to have roles as Dr. Anna Clarke in the international action-thriller Crossing Lines and the aristocratic Lady Katherine Longmore in the miniseries Our Zoo. In 2018, Myles provided her voice for an episode of the sci-fi series Firestorm.

Myles currently plays Rebecca Bishop in the fantasy-romance television series A Discovery of Witches; the first season was released in 2018 and the second in 2021 with a third series already filmed and awaiting release. After roles in the films Two Words (2018) and November 1st (2019), for which she won Best Actress and Best Supporting Actress respectively, Myles played Ann Payne, a secret agent, in the 2020 Portuguese film Listen which was selected as the Portuguese entry for the Best International Feature Film at the 93rd Academy Awards. However, in December 2020 the film was disqualified, as more than half of its dialogue was in English. Also in 2020, Myles reprised her role as Madame de Pompadour for a minisode sequel specially written for her by Steven Moffat that aired on YouTube on 6 May 2020.

In 2021, Myles starred as Beth Barnes in the comedy-heist film Decrypted about the kidnap of the creator of Bitcoin, alongside Amanda Abbington and Kevin McNally. In November 2021, she starred in the film All That Glitters playing a wealthy woman hiding the fact that she is domestically abused; a role that won her Best Actress at the New Renaissance Film Festival and the Gold Movie Awards respectively. In December 2021, Myles played Louise Campbell, Duchess of Argyll in the acclaimed BBC television mini-series A Very British Scandal with Claire Foy and Paul Bettany.

== Personal life ==
From 2004 to 2005, Myles was in a relationship with actor Charles Dance, She has also dated Damian Lewis and musician Paul Wilson from the band Snow Patrol. Myles began dating David Tennant after they filmed an episode of Doctor Who together in 2006. By October 2007, they had separated.

In September 2014, Myles gave birth to a son (Luke Myles Bell), fathered by her partner James Bell, who works for the Bank of England. Her son's godmother is Myles' friend and fellow actress Celia Imrie.

== Filmography ==
=== Film ===
List of Sophia Myles film credits
Year	Title	Role	Notes
1999	Mansfield Park	Susan Price	
1999	Guest House Paradiso	Saucy Wood Nymph	
2001	The Life and Adventures of Nicholas Nickleby	Kate Nickleby	
2001	From Hell	Victoria Abberline	
2002	The Abduction Club	Anne Kennedy	
2003	Underworld	Erika	
2003	Out of Bounds	Louise Thompson	
2004	Thunderbirds	Lady Penelope Creighton-Ward	
2006	Tristan & Isolde	Isolde	
2006	Underworld: Evolution	Erika	
2006	Art School Confidential	Audrey	
2006	Covert One: The Hades Factor	Sophie Amsden	
2006	Dracula	Lucy Westenra	
2007	Hallam Foe	Kate Breck	
2008	Outlander	Freya	
2009	Etienne!	Sophia Myles	Cameo
2012	A Sunny Morning	Grace	Short
2013	The Damned	Lauren	
2014	Transformers: Age of Extinction	Darcy Tirrel	
2014	Blackwood	Rachel Marshall	
2018	Two Words	Victoria	Short
2018	Firestorm	Laura	Voice
2019	November 1st	Caroline	Short
2020	Listen	Ann Payne	
2021	Decrypted	Beth Barnes	
2021	All That Glitters	Margaret	Short
2022	Disarm	Megan Granger	Short
2023	Call Me Back	Lucy	Short
2024	Fragile	Emma	Short

=== Television ===
List of Sophia Myles television credits
Year	Title	Role	Notes
1996	The Prince and the Pauper	Lady Jane Grey	4 episodes
1998	Big Women	Saffron	Episode: "Saffron's Search"
1999	Oliver Twist	Agnes Fleming	2 episodes
2000	Close and True	Marie James	Episode: "Town and Gown"
2001	Heartbeat	Heather Conway	Episode: XI/10 "No Hiding Place"
2002	Foyle's War	Susan Gascoigne	Episode: "A Lesson in Murder"
2003	Coming Up	Nina	Episode: "Money Can Buy You Love"
2005	Colditz	Lizzie Carter	Both 2 episodes
2006	Agatha Christie's Marple	Gwenda Halliday	Episode: "Sleeping Murder"
2006	Doctor Who	Madame de Pompadour	Episode: "The Girl in the Fireplace"
2006	Extras	Defence Lawyer	Episode: "Orlando Bloom"
2007–2008	Moonlight	Beth Turner	16 episodes
2010	Spooks	Beth Bailey	8 episodes
2014	Crossing Lines	Dr. Anna Clarke	2 episodes
2014	Our Zoo	Lady Katherine Longmore	All 6 episodes
2018–2021	A Discovery of Witches	Rebecca Bishop	8 episodes
2021	A Very British Scandal	Louise Campbell	2 episodes
2023	Silent Witness	Laine Cassidy	2 episodes
2024	McDonald & Dodds	Geraldine Bridget DeVere	Episode: "Jinxy Sings The Blues"
2026	Father Brown	Lady Veronica Sheperd	Episode: "The Shadow of Lazarus"

=== Music videos ===
List of Sophia Myles music video credits
Year	Artist	Song
2002	Bush	"Inflatable"
2003	Ronan Keating	"Love Won't Work (If We Don't Try)"
2006	Gavin DeGraw	"We Belong Together"

=== Voice ===
List of Sophia Myles voice credits
Year	Title	Role	Notes
2006	Rainbow Magic	Narrator	5 audiobooks
2012	Afternoon Drama	Fiona	Episode: "Kicking the Air"
2014, 2018	Panorama	Narrator	2 episodes
2018	Doctor Who: The Fourth Doctor Adventures	Rania Chuma	2 episodes

== Awards ==
List of awards and nominations received by Sophia Myles
Year	Award	Category	Project	Result	Ref.
2007	British Academy Scotland Awards	Best Actress	Hallam Foe	Won	
2007	British Independent Film Awards	Best Actress	Hallam Foe	Nominated	
2020	Overcome Film Festival	Best Supporting Actress	November 1st	Won	
2021	CinEuphoria Awards	Best Ensemble	Listen	Nominated	
2021	New Renaissance Film Festival	Best Actress	All That Glitters	Won	
