= Swimming at the 1955 Pan American Games – Women's 100 metre butterfly =

Women's 100 metre butterfly at the 1955 Pan American Games
- Venue: -
- Dates: March 25 (preliminaries and finals)

Medalists
Gold medal	Beth Whittall	Canada
Silver medal	Betty Brey	United States
Bronze medal	Shelley Mann	United States

The women's 100 metre butterfly competition of the swimming events at the 1955 Pan American Games took place on 25 March. It was the first appearance of this event in the Pan American Games.

This race consisted of two lengths of the pool, all in butterfly.

== Results ==
All times are in minutes and seconds.

KEY:	q	Fastest non-qualifiers	Q	Qualified	GR	Games record	NR	National record	PB	Personal best	SB	Seasonal best

=== Final ===
The final was held on March 25.

Rank	Name	Nationality	Time	Notes
1st place, gold medalist(s)	Beth Whittall	Canada	1:16.2	GR
2nd place, silver medalist(s)	Betty Brey	United States	1:16.5	
3rd place, bronze medalist(s)	Shelley Mann	United States	1:17.7	
4	Mary Jane Sears	United States	1:18.2	
5	Maria Amicha	Mexico	1:22.7	
6	Linda Shler	Canada	1:30.2	
7	-	-	-	
8	-	-	-	
