= Swimming at the 1955 Pan American Games – Women's 4 × 100 metre medley relay =

Women's 4 × 100 metre medley relay at the 1955 Pan American Games
- Venue: -
- Dates: March 25 (preliminaries and finals)

Medalists
| Gold medal | Coralie O'Connor, Mary Jane Sears, Betty Brey and Wanda Werner | United States |
| Silver medal | - | Canada |
| Bronze medal | - | Argentina |

The women's 4 × 100 metre medley relay competition of the swimming events at the 1955 Pan American Games took place on 25 March. It was the first appearance of this event in the Pan American Games.

== Results ==
All times are in minutes and seconds.

| KEY: | q | Fastest non-qualifiers | Q | Qualified | GR | Games record | NR | National record | PB | Personal best | SB | Seasonal best |

=== Final ===
The final was held on March 25.

| Rank | Name | Nationality | Time | Notes |
|---|---|---|---|---|
| 1st place, gold medalist(s) | Coralie O'Connor; Mary Jane Sears; Betty Brey; Wanda Werner | United States | 5:11.6 | |
| 2nd place, silver medalist(s) | - - - - | Canada | 5:12.2 | |
| 3rd place, bronze medalist(s) | - - - - | Argentina | 5:30.5 | |
| 4 | - - - - | Brazil | 5:37.3 | |
| 5 | - - - - | Mexico | 5:38.7 | |
| 6 | - - - - | - | - | |
| 7 | - - - - | - | - | |
| 8 | - - - - | - | - | |
