= Susan McGreivy =

American swimmer (1939–2019)

- McGreivy around 27 in 1965

Personal information
- Full name: Susan Douglas Gray McGreivy
- Nickname: "Dougie"
- National team: United States
- Born: October 24, 1939 San Diego, California, U.S.
- Died: November 30, 2019 (aged 80)
- Height: 5 ft 7 in (1.70 m)
- Weight: 128 lb (58 kg)
- Spouses: Dennis John McGreivy (1965-1984)

Sport
- Sport: Swimming
- Strokes: Freestyle
- Club: Walter Reed Swim Club; Washington, D.C.
- Coach: Stan Tinkham (Walter Reed)

Susan Douglas McGreivy (née Gray; October 24, 1939 – November 30, 2019) was an American competition swimmer who represented the United States in the 400-meter women's freestyle at the 1956 Summer Olympics in Melbourne, Australia. She graduated Northwestern University, and later practiced law as a civil rights attorney with the American Civil Liberties Union of Southern California.

McGreivy was born Susan Douglas Gray on October 29, 1939, in San Diego, California to Margaret and James S. Gray Jr., who was a Naval Captain during Susan's time in the 1956 Olympics and had been an outstanding swimmer in High School. Captain Gray would serve as the Deputy Commandant at the Armed Forces College in Norfolk, Virginia. From an accomplished Naval Family, Susan was the granddaughter of Admiral Jesse B. Oldendorf, the primary commander during the American victory at the Battle of Lingayen Gulf.

McGreivy began competing around 12 and swam as a youngster at Maryland's Chevy Chase Country Club Pool. She graduated Holton-Arms School, a quality college preparatory school for girls in Bethesda, Maryland, where at 17 she boarded with fellow swimmer and 1956 Olympian Mary Jane Sears. Sears and Gray both swam for the Walter Reed Army Hospital team under Hall of Fame Coach Stan Tinkham who had swum as an All American at the University of North Carolina, and was then serving as an Army Private. Walter Reed had an outstanding women's team composed primarily of the daughters of local servicemen. Susan, known then as Dougie, held the American 250 and 500-yard freestyle record.

At the 1955 AAU Nationals, Susan won the 400 freestyle, and captured a second place in the 1,500 and 800 freestyle events. She placed third in the 100 freestyle. As a highlight in the 1955 Pan American Games, Susan took third place, winning a bronze in the 400 free.

== 1956 Melbourne Olympics ==
In September 1956 prior to Olympics

At the 1956 Olympics, she competed in the preliminary heats of the women's 400-meter freestyle, and posted a time of 5:16.7, placing ninth. The Head Olympic coach for the U.S. Women's Olympic team that year was her Walter Reed coach, Stan Tinkham. Susan's American teammates at the 1956 Melbourne Olympics with whom she had also trained at the Walter Reed Hospital team included butterfly gold medalist Shelley Mann, butterfly bronze medalist Mary Sears, and Betty Brey who swam with the silver medal women's 4x100 freestyle relay team. A remarkable success, the 1956 Women's Olympic squad scored more points than any other Women's Olympic team in the history of the games to that point, and took six of the combined eleven medals won by the U.S. Men's and Women's teams.

=== Post-swimming life ===
Gray studied at Chicago's Northwestern University, where she graduated in 1961. She worked as a California teacher, worked for the peace corps for three years, where she spent time coaching the swim team of Thailand. For her work bringing age group swimming to Thailand and helping to start their National Olympic team, she received a commendation from Peace Corp Director, Sargent Shriver.

Susan Douglas Grey married Dennis John McGreivy, an English physicist, on February 28, 1965, in Rancho Santa Fe, California. Susan, who was widely travelled partly due to her father's naval career, met her husband in Cambodia. After a trip to Honolulu, the couple planned to initially live in Tokyo, where McGreivy was working as a physicist. During their 15-year marriage, McGreivy raised two children.

She attended law school, and after a 1977 graduation, practiced law in California. In her initial legal career, she clerked primarily for large firms in private practice. McGreivy became a lesbian rights activist and civil rights attorney for the American Civil Liberties Union (ACLU) of Southern California. She had a "leading role" in a range of ACLU gay and lesbian civil rights issues, including a case against the Boy Scouts of America, a defense of the Gay Games against the United States Olympic Committee, and defense of the Norton Sound Eight. A landmark case in many ways, the Norton Sound Eight, brought attention to consistent discrimination against lesbians and gays in the U.S. military, particularly in the Navy. More significantly, it established a useful basis for conducting future inquiries related to LGBTQ members of the military.
