= Phil Hansel =

American swimming coach (1925–2010)

Phillip S. Hansel

Biographical details
- Born: February 18, 1925; Chicago, Illinois
- Died: August 6, 2010 (aged 85); Houston, Texas
- Education: Purdue University 1949

Playing career
- 1945-1949: Purdue University
- Position: Freestyle

Coaching career (HC unless noted)
- 1950-1956: Multinomah Club; Portland, Washington
- 1957-1996: University of Houston
- 1992: U.S. Olympic Team; Manager

Accomplishments and honors

Championships
- 1959 AAU National Championship, Runner-up

Awards
- Texas Swimming and Diving Hall of Fame; SEC Coach of the Year '75 '85 '86

Phillip Sand Hansel (February 18, 1925 – August 6, 2010), known as Phill or Phil Hansel, was an American swimming coach who competed for Purdue University and coached the University of Houston Cougars from 1957-1996.

Philip Hansel was born in Chicago, Illinois on February 18, 1925 to Vernon Ellsworth Hansel and Astrid Sand Hansel. Before college, he served in the Navy, and was a WWII era veteran.

In the mid-40's Hansel swam for Purdue University under Hall of Fame Coach Dick Papenguth who coached at Purdue from 1939-1970 and produced four Olympians, and nine world record holders. Hansel graduated Purdue in 1949, and coached Portland's Multinomah Athletic Club in the 1950's.

== University of Houston ==
Hansel was the swimming coach at the University of Houston for 39 years, from 1957 to 1996. During his time coaching at Houston, he led the swim team to more than 70 dual meet wins and ten Top-20 finishes at the AIAW and NCAA Championships. While coaching Houston, he was named the Southwest Conference's Swimming Coach of the Year three times, in 1975, 1985 and 1986.

Not long after being hired in 1957 as the University's first coach, in 1959 he helped train Carin Cone, a former 1956 Olympic Silver medalist in the 100-meter backstroke. In the years when Houston had no varsity team from 1957-1971, Hansel coached two swim clubs affiliated with the University, the Shamrock Hilton Club from 1957-1969, and the Houston Swim Club. Showing early success, in 1959 the University of Houston swim club finished second at the AAU National Championships.

In 1971, when the varsity swim team was reinstated at the University of Houston, Hansel led the men's team. The women's team was initiated in 1975.

=== U.S. and Olympic teams ===
Hansel was in charge of the 1992 US Swimming Team, which won 27 medals, including 11 gold medals in the Barcelona Olympic Games. He also coached the Singapore Olympic Team in 1984 and served as an assistant in 1988. Hansel served as a coach or manager on two Olympic teams. and helped found the American Swimming Coaches Association.

=== Outstanding swimmers ===
Earning a combined 120 All-America honors, he coached Diane Johannigman from 1978–81, Beverly Rose from 1983-86, Anne Jardin from 1977–81, Nicola Fibbens from 1983-86, Ingrid Lawrence from 1981–84, Cory Schia from 1977-80, Katy Archer from 1982–84 and Olivia Clark from 1982-84. His best known swimmer, who came early in his career, may have been 100-meter backstroke 1956 Melbourne Olympic silver medalist Carin Cone.

Hansel died on Friday, August 6, 2010 at the Houston Veterans Administration Hospital, subsequent to a brief illness caused by a fall. He was married to Janice (Hansel) Muetzel, Nancy (Johnson) Hansel and Barbara (Cox) Hansel and was survived by around nine children and one step-daughter. A memorial service was held Friday, August 13, 2010 at the A.D Bruce Religion Center at the University of Houston. He was buried in section T of the Houston National Cemetery with a graveside cemetery featuring military honors.
