= Beth Bailey =

- Spooks character
- Sophia Myles as Beth Bailey
- First appearance: Series 9, Episode 1
- Last appearance: Series 9, Episode 8
- Portrayed by: Sophia Myles

In-universe information
- Alias: Claire
- Title(s): Junior Case Officer, Section D
- Occupation: MI5 officer
- Nationality: British

Beth Bailey is a fictional character from the BBC espionage television series Spooks, which follows the exploits of Section D, a counter-terrorism division in MI5. She is portrayed by British actress Sophia Myles.

The character was introduced in Spooks's ninth series as a private contractor in her first episode, and later joins Section D. The character is based on a real-life person Myles met while working on the series. Reaction towards the character was generally positive.

== Role in Spooks ==
=== Character arc ===
She first appears in the series nine premiere disguised as a prostitute in a freighter from Tangier, working to track Hussein Abib, a Somali terrorist Lucas North (Richard Armitage) was sent to kill. They both escape the ship when Abib's men take control of the ship. Afterwards, Beth reveals that a Colombian drug lord built submersibles to smuggle drugs; because of this, MI5 learn Abib is using the submersibles to smuggle explosives to the Houses of Parliament. After they stop the attack, Harry instates her to MI5 officer.

=== Characteristics ===
You're a profiteer. You exploit death, violence and misery for money.

— Lucas North, from the series nine premiere

Actress Sophia Myles said that Beth believes Dimitri Levendis (played by Max Brown) to be her closest ally because of their same age and time they joined MI5, comparing the two as "new kids at school". Because Bailey knew Harry 12 years previously, she feels "very comfortable already with him." In a separate interview, Myles stated that Lucas is "highly suspicious of her because she's highly confident" and that Beth "likes him more than he likes her."

== Conceptual history ==
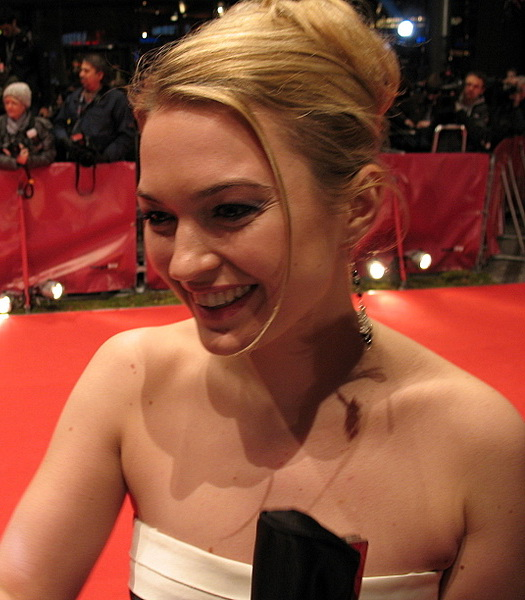
Sophia Myles portrays Beth Bailey.

The character Beth Bailey and portraying actress Sophia Myles was first revealed in March 2010 as a replacement for Jo Portman (played by Miranda Raison), who left Spooks during the eighth series. Bailey is based on a real-life person, whom Myles met while working in the series, but unlike the person, the producers added elements to make Beth a darker character. Before joining the series, Myles had never seen an episode of Spooks, but caught up by watching the first and eighth series so she would know "where [she] was coming in."

Myles felt nervous becoming part of an established series, comparing herself as the "new kid on the block" and "like joining the Big Brother house late." Though Myles posed as a prostitute for her first episode as Beth, she felt that the outfit she worn was "the most hideous, most unattractive outfit" she ever worn. When questioned about the possibility of the death of her character, Myles stated; "you'd be an idiot not to expect your death at some point because that's the way they roll on this show."

Since the cast "never stop running" in the series, Myles trained by running around her local park once or twice a week. Despite this, she does not perform many of her own stunts. In April 2011, it was revealed that Myles would not reprise her role as Beth Bailey in the tenth series, indicating the character would be "decommissioned."

== Reception ==
Reaction towards the character by critics are generally positive. Reflecting on the departure of Ros Myers, Adam Sweeting of The Arts Desk believed that Beth "looks poised to bring a refreshingly brash self-confidence to the party." Comparing some of Sophia Myles' earlier roles, Vicky Power of The Daily Telegraph said that her "grubby debut" in Spooks is "noteworthy" because of a "leap from the crinolined English roses we've seen her play up to now in costume dramas such as Mansfield Park, The Adventures of Nicholas Nickleby and Tristan & Isolde. In review of the second episode of series nine, Jane Simon of the Daily Mirror stated that Myles "is already proving to be a most exciting addition to the Spooks team," and Beth can "handle herself pretty well."
