= Martha Gultom =

Indonesian swimmer

Personal information
- Full name: Martha Gultom
- Nationality: Indonesian
- Born: June 15, 1939 (age 87) Bengkulu, Indonesia

Sport
- Sport: Swimming
- Club: Tirta Kencana

Martha Gultom (born 1939) is an Indonesian former swimmer. She competed in the women's 100 metre backstroke at the 1956 Summer Olympics.
