= The Damned (2013 film) =

- Directed by: Víctor Garcia
- Written by: Richard D'Ovidio
- Produced by: Peter Block; Andrea Chung; David Higgins
- Starring: Peter Facinelli; Sophia Myles; Nathalia Ramos; Carolina Guerra
- Cinematography: Alejandro Moreno
- Edited by: Etienne Boussac; José Luis Romeu
- Music by: Richard D'Ovidio
- Production companies: Launchpad Productions; A Bigger Boat; RCN Films & e-nnovva; Bowery Hills Entertainment
- Distributed by: IFC Midnight
- Release dates: October 17, 2013 (Sitges Film Festival); August 29, 2014 (United States)
- Running time: 87 minutes
- Country: United States
- Languages: English; Spanish
- Box office: $1.5 million

The Damned, also known as Gallows Hill, is a 2013 American horror film directed by Víctor Garcia. The film stars Peter Facinelli, Sophia Myles, Nathalia Ramos and Carolina Guerra. It shows a family and group of friends stranded in a storm and looking to seek refuge in a house inhabited by an ancient evil presence. The film was produced by Peter Block, Andrea Chung, and David Higgins, and is a joint Colombian-American production. The film had its world premiere at the Sitges Film Festival on October 17, 2014. and was released on video on demand on July 25, 2014, before a limited release by IFC Midnight on August 29, 2014. The film received generally negative reviews.

== Plot ==
American photographer David Reynolds and his British fiancée Lauren go to Colombia to persuade David's teenage daughter, Jill, to return to America so she can attend their wedding. They find her with David's former sister-in-law, Gina, a television reporter, and Gina's cameraman Ramón, whom Jill is dating. Annoyed that her father intends to get married after the death of her mother Marcela, Jill refuses to attend the wedding. After David insists that she can not stay in Colombia, she replies that she has left her passport in a nearby city. Jill invites Ramón to come along with them to retrieve her passport, much to David's annoyance.

On the way, they encounter Captain Morales, who warns them to turn back, as the roads ahead have become flooded. After he leaves, Gina brushes off his concerns and advises them to continue, as she knows the roads well. Once in the storm, however, they become lost and lose control of the car. A wave pushes the car off the road, and, amid other minor injuries, Lauren breaks two of her ribs in the resulting accident. Leaving the car, they encounter a remote inn whose owner, Felipe, tells them it is closed and to seek help in town. Their injuries convince him to let them in, but he warns them to not leave the lobby.

David and Felipe go outside to get firewood. As Jill and Ramón wander around the inn to find a bathroom, Jill hears a girl calling out for help in Spanish. They hide when they hear Felipe return and see him check a basement door before the others mollify him. When Jill and Ramón check the basement, they find Ana Maria, Felipe's daughter, locked in a box. Felipe angrily confronts them with a rifle, but David saves them by knocking out Felipe. David lets Ana Maria out of the box and ties up Felipe. Ana Maria does not speak much, and, when Felipe regains consciousness, he only tells them that they will all die. They gag him and look for a working car or phone, to no avail.

They soon become suspicious when they discover the inn has not had a customer since 1978, Felipe has a decades-old photograph of Ana Marie, and the box is carved with occult symbols. Ana Marie taunts Felipe by telling him that she will kill everyone. When he frees himself, he slashes his wrists and runs at her with a knife. Ramón, who earlier took Felipe's rifle, shoots and kills him. As Gina and Ana Marie separate from the others to talk, Captain Morales arrives and demands to see Felipe. When they explain that they had to kill him in self-defense, Morales orders them at gunpoint to enter the box. David briefly enters the box, but rushes Morales and disarms him.

Morales reveals that Ana Marie is a bruja, a Spanish witch. She can take over the body of anyone who kills her current host. Felipe locked her up nearly 40 years ago after his daughter was possessed. The witch knows everyone's secrets and uses them to sow discord and encourage people to kill her, so she can inhabit the strongest person. Gina kills Ana Marie after she threatens to reveal Gina's abortion, and Ramón kills the witch (Gina) when she reveals that he is a serial killer who preys on young women. Morales encourages them to wound the witch (Ramón) rather than kill her, but Lauren accidentally kills Ramón. The witch (Lauren) taunts them by revealing that David turned off Marcela's life support without telling Jill.

After they bring Lauren back to the house, David insists they find a way to cure her, but Morales says it is not possible. The witch frees herself from Lauren, kills Morales, and promises to let Jill live if David will sacrifice himself, as the witch does not want to inhabit Lauren's injured body. David initially refuses, but, after the witch appears to him as Marcela and disfigures herself, he agrees. Before David can sacrifice himself, Jill kills the witch herself. Overcome with grief, David locks Jill (now possessed) in the box.

== Cast ==
- Peter Facinelli as David Reynolds
- Sophia Myles as Lauren
- Nathalia Ramos as Jill Reynolds
- Carolina Guerra as Gina
- Sebastián Martínez as Ramón
- Julieta Salazar as Ana Maria
- Juan Pablo Gamboa as Captain Morales
- Gustavo Angarita as Felipe
- Tatiana Renteria as Marcela Reynolds

== Release ==
The film had its world premiere on October 17, 2013, at the Sitges Film Festival. in February 2014 it was announced IFC Films had acquired distribution rights to the film in the United States. The film was released in Colombia on June 20, 2014, as Encerrada. The film was released in the United States on July 25, 2014, on video on demand before a limited release on August 29, 2014, by IFC Midnight a division of IFC Films. The film was released in Germany on Blu-ray and DVD on December 4, 2014.

== Reception ==
Rotten Tomatoes, a review aggregator, reports that 8% of twelve surveyed critics gave it a positive review; the average rating is 3.46/10. Metacritic rated it 39/100 based on six reviews. Maitland McDonagh of Film Journal International states the film "could find a niche as part of a Halloween possess-a-thon, but on its own there's just not much to it". Elizabeth Weitzman of the New York Daily News gives the film 2 out of 5 stars, stating, "strong performance doesn’t scare off moviegoers in this serviceable, but gruesome, horror flick", while Jeannette Catsoulis of The New York Times describes the film as "bloody vomit, a ghostly fetus and terrible room service". Frank Scheck of The Hollywood Reporter called it "a better than average example of its overworked genre". Gary Goldstein of the Los Angeles Times wrote that the script causes the film to be "more risible than frightening".
