= Swimming at the 1956 Summer Olympics – Women's 100 metre backstroke =

Women's 100 metre backstroke at the Games of the XVI Olympiad
- Venue: Swimming and Diving Stadium
- Date: 3 December 1956 (heats); 5 December 1956 (final)
- Competitors: 23 from 14 nations
- Winning time: 1:12.9 WR

Medalists
1st place, gold medalist(s)		Judy Grinham	Great Britain
2nd place, silver medalist(s)		Carin Cone	United States
3rd place, bronze medalist(s)		Margaret Edwards	Great Britain

The women's 100 metre backstroke event at the 1956 Olympic Games took place on 5 December. This swimming event used backstroke. Twenty-three swimmers from 14 countries competed in this swimming event. Because an Olympic-size swimming pool is 50 metres long, this race consisted of two lengths of the pool. This was the seventh time that there had been the women's 100-metre backstroke after its debut in the 1924 Paris Olympics.

== Results ==
=== Heats ===
Eight fastest swimmers advanced to the finals.

Heat 1

Rank	Athlete	Country	Time	Notes
1	Judy Grinham	Great Britain	1:13.1	Q
2	Maria Both	Romania	1:15.8	
3	Liudmyla Klipova	Soviet Union	1:16.1	
4	Mary Anne Marchino	United States	1:16.2	
5	Elżbieta Gellner	Poland	1:16.2	
6	Pam Singleton	Australia	1:17.0	
7	Lenora Fisher	Canada	1:17.5	
8	Ginette Jany-Sendral	France	1:19.1	

Heat 2

Rank	Athlete	Country	Time	Notes
1	Carin Cone	United States	1:13.9	Q
2	Gergaynia Beckett	Australia	1:14.8	Q
3	Julie Hoyle	Great Britain	1:15.0	Q
4	Éva Pajor	Hungary	1:15.3	
5	Jean Stewart	New Zealand	1:15.4	
6	Moira Abernethy	South Africa	1:15.4	
7	Jocelyn von Giese	Philippines	1:20.0	

Heat 3

Rank	Athlete	Country	Time	Notes
1	Margaret Edwards	Great Britain	1:13.0	Q
2	Sara Barber	Canada	1:14.3	Q
3	Helga Schmidt-Neuber	United Team of Germany	1:14.8	Q
4	Maureen Murphy	United States	1:14.8	Q
5	Patricia Huntingford	Australia	1:16.0	
6	Philippa Gould	New Zealand	1:17.5	
7	Judit Temes	Hungary	1:17.6	
8	Martha Gultom	Indonesia	1:21.7	

=== Final ===
Rank	Athlete	Country	Time	Notes
1	Judy Grinham	Great Britain	1:12.9	WR
2	Carin Cone	United States	1:12.9	=WR
3	Margaret Edwards	Great Britain	1:13.1	
4	Helga Schmidt-Neuber	United Team of Germany	1:13.4	
5	Maureen Murphy	United States	1:14.1	
6	Julie Hoyle	Great Britain	1:14.3	
7	Sara Barber	Canada	1:14.3	
8	Gergaynia Beckett	Australia	1:14.7	

Key: WR = World record
