= Betty Brey =

American swimmer (1931–2015)

- Brey, c. 1948

Personal information
- Full name: Elizabeth Evadna Mullen Brey
- Nickname: "Betty"
- National team: United States
- Born: November 23, 1931 Weissport, Pennsylvania, U.S.
- Died: March 21, 2015 (aged 83) Lake Mary, Florida, U.S.
- Height: 5 ft 5 in (1.65 m)
- Weight: 130 lb (59 kg)
- Spouse: Paul Brey (m. 1955)
- Children: 3

Sport
- Sport: Swimming
- Strokes: Freestyle; Butterfly
- Club: Women's Swim Association, New York; Lafayette Swim Club; Walter Reed Swim Club
- College team: Purdue Boilermakers; Trained with men's team
- Coach: Dick Papenguth (Purdue); Stan Tinkham (Walter Reed)
Medal record
Women's swimming
Representing the United States
Pan American Games
Gold medal – first place	1951 Buenos Aires	4×100 m freestyle
Gold medal – first place	1955 Mexico City	4×100 m medley
Silver medal – second place	1951 Buenos Aires	200 m freestyle
Silver medal – second place	1955 Mexico City	100 m butterfly

Elizabeth Evadna Mullen Brey (née Mullen; November 23, 1931 – March 21, 2015) was an American competition swimmer who represented the United States in the 4x100 freestyle relay at the 1956 Summer Olympics in Melbourne, Australia. In addition to marriage and raising three children, she would work as a physical therapist, physical education teacher at Chevy Chase High School, a swim instructor, and as a coach of the women's swimming team at George Washington University.

== Early life ==
Betty Mullen was born on November 23, 1931 in Weissport, Pennsylvania to Charles Mullen, a trainmaster with the Lehigh Valley Railroad, and Evadna Hill Mullen. Betty attended Lehighton High School, graduating in 1948, where in addition to her swimming, she was a majorette and led the large 80 member Lehighton High School marching band. She was one of five children and the only girl among four athletic male siblings, that included Thomas, Dean, Richard and Jack. Dean and Richard played High School basketball and baseball as did her younger brother Jack. In the 1960s Tom would help manage the local Lehighton Community Pool, and her brothers Thomas and Dean would attend teacher's colleges and pursue careers in Education, as would her future husband Paul.

Despite her male sibling's love of sports particularly baseball, her father Charles did not encourage her to play boys' sports, but strongly supported her interest in swimming, a sport that would greatly influence her future. The Weissport area offered few pools, and fewer clubs where she could compete. She began swimming summers at Graver's Pool in Lehighton as her father knew the owner. She took up more focused training at the Allentown YMCA one day a week, where she won a few competitions including one that included diving, and was coached by their Athletic director Dennis McGinley. One of her first major local freestyle events was a one mile open swim at the Lehigh River where she placed second.

== Women's Swimming Association ==
Looking for more challenging swim programs, Brey began training two evenings a week with the exceptionally accomplished Women's Swimming Association in New York encouraged and often accompanied in her first year by her father Charles, a trainmaster, though it required a three-hour train ride to attend their evening practice. She left High School fifteen minutes early, around 3:00 pm to attend the Women's Swimming Association (WSA) practice in New York City from 7:00-8:30 pm, sometimes not arriving home until around 3:00 am after boarding the midnight return train. At the WSA, she was managed by Coach Lou Dandled, who helped her drop her freestyle times sufficiently to qualify for the 1948 Olympic Trials. Swimming with the WSA as a 16-year old High School Junior in February 1948, Brey's best time in the 100-yard freestyle was 1:04 and then to 1:02 after four months with the WSA. New York's WSA was a legendary program that had originated many of America's first female Olympians and campaigned to allow women to swim in more Olympic events. The organization was founded by Charlotte Epstein in 1917 and in its earliest years, worked for women's suffrage.

== Purdue University ==
Brey attended Purdue University, where she was a majorette in their marching band. As was common in the 1950s, Purdue had no women's swimming team, so Betty trained with the men's team under Hall of Fame Coach Richard "Pappy" Pappenguth, and competed for the local Lafayette Swim Club, also coached by Pappenguth. At the time, Perdue had one of the most outstanding freestyle sprint programs in the country and Brey continued to improve her times under Pappenguth's skilled training. Brey's Lafayette Club won the local women's amateur title in three successive years. Primarily a freestyler, Brey set national records in the 50, 75, and 100-yard freestyle while at Purdue.

As a College Junior she trained in the summer of 1952 to qualify as a freestyle sprinter for the 1952 Helsinki Olympics, but failed to make the team. She was disappointed in her failure to qualify, particularly since her Purdue coach, Dick Papenguth was the U.S. Olympic head coach that year.

Brey graduated Purdue with a Bachelors of Science on May 31, 1953, and immediately sought commission as a Second Lieutenant in the Army with an assignment at Fort Sam Houston's Brooke Army Medical Center, an intent to study Physical Therapy.

== Walter Reed Army Hospital ==
After completing her studies in physical therapy at the Brooke Army Medical Center, she obtained a transfer, and began working as a physical therapist at Washington D.C.'s Walter Reed Army Hospital. She specialized at Walter Reed working with people recovering from Polio, and amputees from the Korean War. While at Walter Reed, she began training with their exceptional swim program in the 1950s under Head Coaches Jim Campbell and after 1954, trained exclusively with Stan Tinkham, a Hall of Fame Coach, who had been an All American swimmer for the University of North Carolina. Interestingly, Shelley Mann, one of her exceptional teammates on the Walter Reed Hospital swim team, had herself recovered from childhood polio, yet would attend the 1956 Olympics with her, and win the first gold medal in the 100-meter butterfly event. Mary Jane Sears was another Walter Reed teammate who would also medal at the 1956 Olympics.

Taking time off from Walter Reed in the summer of 1955, Brey went on an American Athletic Union tour giving butterfly exhibitions in Greece, Turkey, Germany and Italy.

Lt. Betty E. Mullens married Paul M. Brey Jr. on August 20, 1955, at Zion Evangelical and Reformed Church in Lehighton, Pennsylvania. Betty's brothers served as ushers. Betty was nearing the end of her service as a physical therapist at Walter Reed Hospital in Washington, D.C. The couple planned to live in Bethesda, Maryland, after a tour of the Southern States. Betty and Paul had met at Lehighton High School, as both were graduates. Paul Brey had graduated West Chester Teachers College in West Chester, Pennsylvania and at the time was serving with the army at Fort Dix, around a three and a half hour drive from Bethesda. He would later have a career in education. Brey was discharged from the Army in August 1955, and began work that Fall as a High School teacher in physical education at Chevy Chase High School.

Betty set a world record time of 1:15 in the 100-yard butterfly in Philadelphia in August 1955.

Brey competed in the 1955 Mexico City Pan Am Games, placing first in the 4 × 100 meter freestyle relay. Familiar with the new butterfly stroke, she captured a silver medal in the 100-meter fly. That summer she set both American and World records in the butterfly's 100 yard and 100 meter event.

After her marriage, Betty decided to set a goal to train for the 1956 Olympics, while still a member of the outstanding Walter Reed Club. Stan Tinkham, her coach at Walter Reed excelled in coaching freestyle sprinters, and early butterfly competitors. In April 1956, her best time in the 100-yard butterfly was 1:05.4 set in the 1955 Nationals.

== 1956 Melbourne Olympics ==
Swimming as Betty Brey, she placed only fifth in the 100-meter freestyle at the 1956 Detroit Olympic trials, but it was enough to earn her a spot on the 4x100 freestyle relay team. Somewhat disappointed, after being edged out of third place by 6/10 of a second by Nancy Ramey of the Washington Athletic Club, Brey finished in fourth place in the trials of the 100 butterfly with a time of 1:14.7, failing to qualify in the event, and would be unable to swim one of her strongest events in Melbourne.

At the Melbourne Olympics, Brey swam for the silver medal-winning U.S. team in the preliminary heats of the women's 4×100-meter freestyle relay. She was not eligible to receive a medal under the 1956 Olympic swimming rules, however, because she did not swim in the relay final. The Women's team was coached by her Walter Reed Swim Coach Stan Tinkham that year and took six of the combined eleven medals won by the U.S. Men's and Women's teams. Several of her Walter Reed team mates made the team and medaled that year.

=== Later life ===
In 1964, Brey taught clinics and served as a swim and water ballet instructor at Chevy Chase, Maryland's Columbia Country Club, and served as an official at the 1964 Olympic trails in Long Island, New York. Brey accepted a position as the women's swim coach at George Washington University from 1978-1982. In January 1980 season working under Athletic Director Lynne George, she had had three swimmers and one diver on scholarship at George Washington, but had plans to increase the scholarships awarded to 12 in swimming and 3 in diving in the upcoming 1980 season.

Swimming for District of Columbia Masters in August, 1975, she won the 100-meter longcourse Master's freestyle event at the University of Tennessee and the 200 backstroke competition in a time of 34.7. Continuing to swim for recreation and fitness, she swam and trained with United States Masters Swimming, where she competed into her eighties.

Part of a family closely tied to sports, her husband Paul was a high school athletics director in Maryland. Her son Mike Brey was hired in 2000 as the men's basketball coach at the University of Notre Dame, daughter Brenda was a swimmer at Louisiana State University and a physical education teacher and son Shane Brey was the Founder and inventor of 360 Hoops and worked in sports marketing at the University of Central Florida.

== Honors ==
She was a member of the Alumni Relations Board of U.S.A. Swimming, and received the honor of membership in Purdue University's Athletic Hall of Fame. She and her husband were both honoraries of the Carbon County Sports Hall of Fame, and she was made a "Graduate of Distinction" by the Lehighton Education & Athletic Foundation. For her swimming achievements, Brey was made a member of the Indiana University Wall of Fame at the Indiana University Pool. As a local tribute in September 2017, a statue was constructed in Weissport Park, in her hometown.

Brey died March 21, 2015, at her home in Lake Mary, Florida, in greater Orlando, of a heart attack; she was 83 years old.

== See also ==
- List of Purdue University people
