= Shelley Mann =

American swimmer (1937–2005)

Personal information
- Full name: Shelley Isabel Mann
- National team: United States
- Born: October 15, 1937 Long Island, New York, U.S.
- Died: March 24, 2005 (aged 67) Alexandria, Virginia, U.S.
- Height: 5 ft 8 in (1.73 m)
- Weight: 134 lb (61 kg)

Sport
- Sport: Swimming
- Strokes: Butterfly, freestyle
- Club: Walter Reed Swim Club
- Coach: Jim Campbell (Walter Reed); Stan Tinkham (Walter Reed)
Medal record
Women's swimming
Representing the United States
Olympic Games
Gold medal – first place	1956 Melbourne	100 m butterfly
Silver medal – second place	1956 Melbourne	4x100 m freestyle
Pan American Games
Bronze medal – third place	1955 Mexico City	100 m butterfly

Shelley Isabel Mann (October 15, 1937 – March 24, 2005) was an American competition swimmer, who overcame childhood polio to win the first gold medal ever awarded in the women's 100-meter butterfly event at the 1956 Melbourne Olympics. She was also a member of the 1956 U.S. Olympic team that won the silver medal for the women's 4×100-meter freestyle relay.

== Early years ==
Mann was born one of two daughters in Long Island, New York on October 13, 1937, to Hamilton and Isabel Lanford Mann. Her father, with roots in Virginia, was in the U.S. Navy during World War II and would reach the rank of Commander. He served as the Director of the USA Security Agency's division of Computer Communications from 1955-71.

At age six, Mann contracted polio while living in Cambridge, Massachusetts. She spent weeks in the hospital and was left with a paralyzed right leg. Over the next few years, Mann took daily sessions of therapy, including passive and active hydrotherapy. Although progress was slow, her therapy produced results, as she regained the use and control of her arms, and regained control and functionality of her legs by ten, though she had initially walked with a limp. In the late 1940s after WWII, her father returned the family to their native Virginia, and lived in the Arlington area. At the age of 11, she learned to swim.

== Achievements in competitive swimming ==
In 1952 around the age of 14, while living in the Arlington, Virginia area, Mann began training with the outstanding swimming program at the Walter Reed Army Hospital swim club and was discovered by their Coach Jim Campbell. The club had just been formed in 1952 with Campbell as coach, and practiced at the Walter Reed Hospital Pool in Washington, D.C. By 1954, when Mann was a High School Junior, Hall of Famer Stan Tinkham, a former All American at the University of North Carolina, became the Head Coach at Walter Reed when Campbell resigned. At the age of 12, Mann was swimming competitively, and at 14, won the first of her 24 AAU national championships in the freestyle, breaststroke, backstroke, butterfly, and individual medley events.

At 15, Mann held multiple world records, though these are currently not FINA recognized as they were set before 1957.

In 1955, Mann graduated Arlington, Virginia's Washington-Lee High School.

At the 100 metres butterfly event at the 1955 Pan American Games in Mexico City in late March, Mann won a bronze medal, recording a time of 1:17.7.

== 1956 Melbourne Olympics ==
At the 1956 US Olympic swimming trials in Detroit in mid-August, Mann gained additional expertise in the butterfly stroke after instruction from Coach Charles Silva, who coached swimming at Springfield College. She also received tips on the butterfly stroke from future 1956 Olympic butterfly gold medalist William Yorzyk. Silva taught Mann, using Yorzyk, a skilled butterfly competitor whom he had trained at Springfield, to demonstrate the finer points of the stroke. Both Yorzyk and Mann would go on to win the only butterfly events at the 1956 Melbourne Olympics. Yorzyk recalled that Mann had trouble breaking bad habits when transitioning from butterfly-breaststroke to butterfly.

In the preliminary heats of the 1956 U.S. Trials, she swam the existing world record time of 1:04.6 for the 100 m freestyle. Despite her speed, American Olympic teams faced a strong challenge from the dominant Australian men's and women's team. Other Walter Reed swimmers who qualified for the Olympics at the trials included Susan Douglas, Betty Mullens Brey and Mary Jane Sears.

At 19, in the preliminary heats of the December, 1956 Melbourne Olympics, Mann set a record time of 1:11.2 in the 100-meter butterfly. In the finals, she won the inaugural 100 metres butterfly event, with an Olympic record time of 1:11.0, sweeping the event with two other American team members. Mann was also a member of the U.S. team that won the silver medal for the women's 4×100-meter freestyle relay that swam a combined time of 4:19.2. Mann swam second, and helped the American team to gain ground on the dominant Australian squad who had gained a lead over the Americans through the efforts of their lead off swimmer Dawn Fraser. Both the Australian team and the American team finished in combined times under the prior world record in the event.

Mann placed sixth in the 100m freestyle event with a time of 1:05.6, placing out of medal contention. The Olympic Women's swimming team was coached by her Walter Reed Swim Coach Stan Tinkham that year and took six of the combined eleven medals won by the U.S. Men's and Women's teams.

While studying at the American University in Washington, D.C., she remained with the Walter Reed Swim Club under young Hall of Fame Coach Stan Tinkham. The swim team trained at 6:00am because the Walter Reed medical hospital pool was used by the patients in the afternoon, though the evening time of 4:00 pm was later adopted as a practice time as well.

== Later life ==
At 19, after the Olympics, Mann enrolled at Cornell University.

After graduating from Cornell in 1961, she worked as a swim coach. In 1964, she coached swimming to blind children for the Columbia Lighthouse in Washington. She later founded her own club, the Shelley Mann Swim School in Arlington, Virginia.

=== Honors ===
Mann received the National B'nai B'rith Award for “high principle and achievement in sports”, an award of merit in Aquatics from the Los Angeles Times, and a goodwill tour of New Zealand from the New Zealand Swimming Association. She was inducted into the Virginia Sports Hall of Fame in 1984.

In a more distinctive honor, she was inducted into the International Swimming Hall of Fame as an "honor swimmer" in 1966.

== Death ==
Shelley Mann died on 24 March 2005, at Virginia Hospital Center at the age of 67 and was buried in her families plot of land in Thornrose Cemetery, in Staunton, Virginia. Graveside services were held on April 1, 2005.

== See also ==
- List of members of the International Swimming Hall of Fame
- List of American University people
- List of Olympic medalists in swimming (women)
