= The Abduction Club =

2002 British-Irish film by Stefan Schwartz

- Film poster
- Directed by: Stefan Schwartz
- Written by: Richard Crawford, Bill Britten
- Produced by: David Collins
- Starring: Alice Evans; Daniel Lapaine; Sophia Myles; Matthew Rhys
- Cinematography: Howard Atherton
- Music by: Shaun Davey
- Distributed by: Pathe Distribution (UK)
- Release date: 19 July 2002
- Running time: 96 minutes
- Countries: United Kingdom; Ireland
- Language: English

The Abduction Club is a 2002 British-Irish romantic comedy-drama adventure film directed by Stefan Schwartz. Based loosely on real events, the plot centres on a group of outlaws who abduct women in order to marry them. It was written by Richard Crawford and Bill Britten.

== Plot ==
In 18th century Ireland, there are two financially insecure young bachelors, Garrett Byrne and James Strang, whose exploits evolve from the need to secure wealth. Both are younger sons that will not inherit titles and estates so they become members of an infamous society known as the 'Abduction Club', whose main aim is to woo and then abduct wealthy heiresses in order to marry them (therefore providing themselves with financial security). The men decide to set their sights on the beautiful yet feisty Kennedy sisters, Catherine and Anne, but are unprepared for the negative reaction they are to receive, and they soon find themselves on the run across the Irish countryside (with the sisters in tow) from Anne's cold-hearted admirer, John Power, who does not take kindly to the news of their kidnapping, and with the help of the embittered Attorney General Lord Fermoy, implicates Byrne and Strang in the murder of a Redcoat soldier.

== Cast ==
- Alice Evans as Catherine Kennedy
- Daniel Lapaine as Garrett Byrne
- Sophia Myles as Anne Kennedy
- Matthew Rhys as James Strang
- Liam Cunningham as John Power
- Edward Woodward as Lord Fermoy
- Patrick Malahide as Sir Myles
- Tom Murphy as Knox

== Reception ==
On the review aggregator website Rotten Tomatoes, 40% of 5 critics' reviews are positive, with an average rating of 4.9/10.
