= Éva Pajor =

Hungarian swimmer

Personal information
- Nationality: Hungarian
- Born: 16 September 1937 Budapest, Hungary
- Died: 19 December 2014 (aged 77)

Sport
- Sport: Swimming

Éva Pajor (16 September 1937 – 19 December 2014) was a Hungarian swimmer. She competed in the women's 100 metre backstroke at the 1956 Summer Olympics in Melbourne. Following the Olympics, she sought asylum in Australia, becoming a swimming teacher in Sydney. She later opened two swimming centres in the country, and a swimming centre in Penrith, New South Wales was named after her.
