= Carin Cone =

American swimmer (1940–2025)

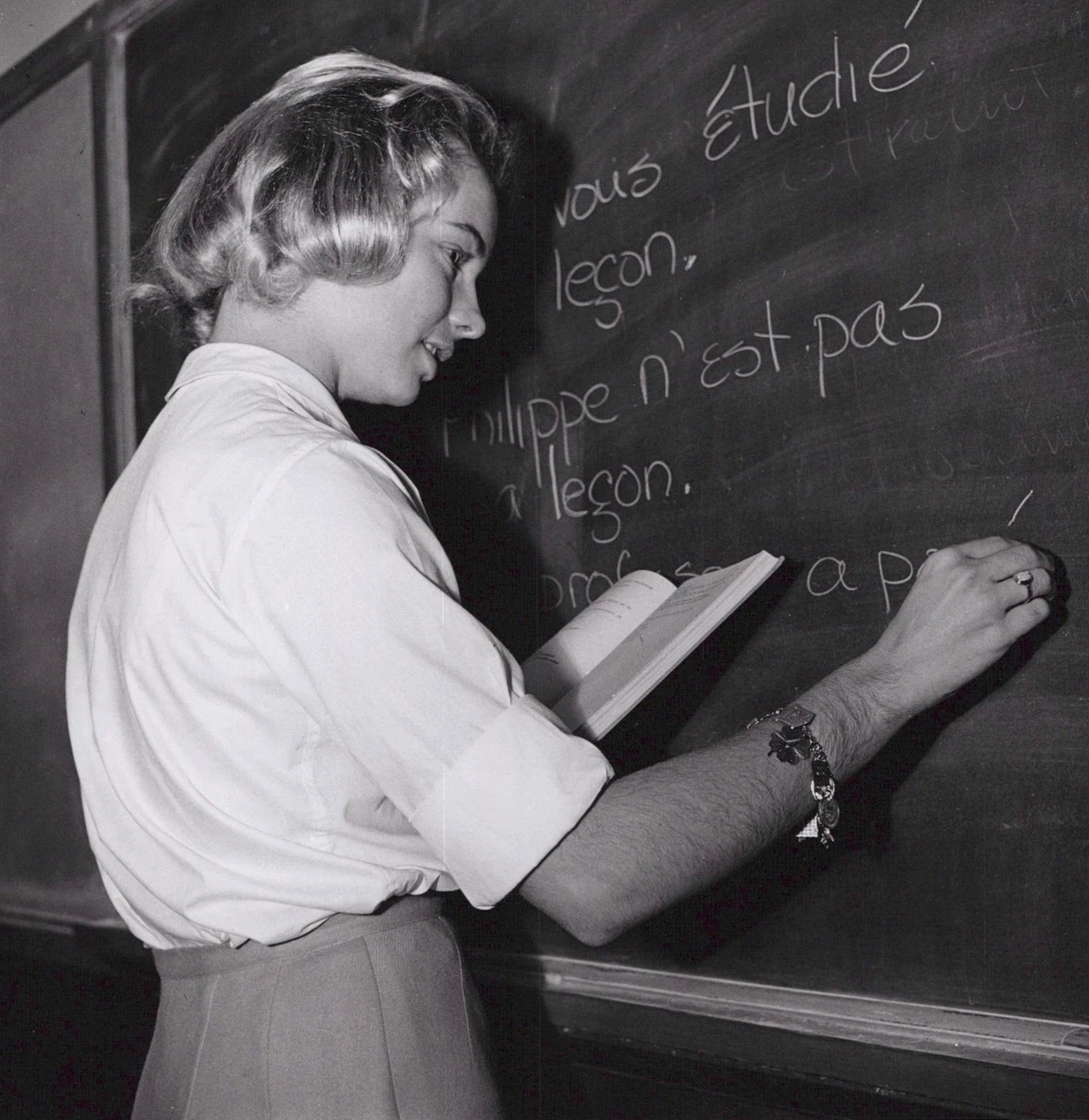

Personal information
- Full name: Carin Alice Cone
- National team: United States
- Born: 18 April 1940 Huntington, New York, U.S.
- Died: 13 June 2025 (aged 85)
- Height: 5 ft 6 in (1.68 m)
- Weight: 130 lb (59 kg)
- Spouse: Albert Vanderbush III

Sport
- Sport: Swimming
- Strokes: Backstroke
- Club: Women's Swimming Association (WSA); Shamrock Club, Houston
- Coach: Marie Giardine (WSA); Phil Hansel (Shamrocks)
Medal record
Representing the United States
Olympic Games
| Silver medal – second place | 1956 Melbourne | 100 m backstroke |
Pan American Games
| Gold medal – first place | 1959 Chicago | 100 m backstroke |
| Gold medal – first place | 1959 Chicago | 4×100 m medley |

Carin Alice Cone (18 April 1940 – 13 June 2025), also known by her married name Carin Cone Vanderbush after 1962, was an American competition swimmer for the University of Houston's Shamrock Club, a 1956 Olympic silver medalist, and a former world record-holder in multiple events.

== Early life and education ==
Cone was born on April 18, 1940, to Luther Raymond and Ruth Cone, a school teacher. She attended Ridgewood High School, graduating in 1958.

Cone learned to swim at age five, and her mother enrolled her at New York's Women's Swimming Association at age nine, where she was coached by Marie Giardine. Charlotte Epstein founded the WSA, an outstanding program with a long history of national champions, and Olympic participants, in the 1920s.

Cone won her first Junior National title at the age of 13. An exceptional high school student, with high test scores reflecting academic potential, she graduated with honors despite missing a third of her senior year to attend the Olympics. She received the Student Council Award for scholastic achievement in her senior year.

In July 1956, Cone set an AAU, American and world record time of 2:43.8 in the 200-meter backstroke, breaking the 1951 former world record set by Judit Temes of Hungary.

== 1956 Olympic silver medal ==
Cone competed at the 1956 Summer Olympics in Melbourne, Australia, where she won a silver medal in the 100-meter backstroke, having the same time (1:12.9 – new world record) as British swimmer Judy Grinham, who was later judged as the gold medal winner.

In the event finals, Cone, the only American to medal, and both Judith Grinhim and Margaret Edwards of Great Britain appeared to touch the wall simultaneously, with the timers giving Grinham and Cone a dead heat tie in world record time. Since a tie was not possible according to the rules, the decision for first place was made by a jury. After deliberating, the majority of the judges named British swimmer Grinham as the Olympic gold medalist. Cone was given the silver medal, as she had initially tied with Grinhim in the official scoring, which used observation, timers, and photography.

=== University of Houston ===
Cone attended the University of Houston from around 1958 to 1960. She made the dean's list as a freshman, studying up to 40 hours a week. Her swim training included up to 25 hours in the pool beginning at 6 AM, and she trained an average of two to three miles daily.

Although there was no official women's swimming team at the time, she was coached and managed by Phil Hansel, who was hired as the university's first coach in 1957, and helped train Cone in 1959. In the years when Houston had no varsity team, from 1957 to 1971, Hansel coached two swim clubs affiliated with the university. A former swimmer for Purdue University, and Portland's Multinomah Athletic Club, Hansel managed swimming for the University of Houston from 1957 to 1996. From 1958 to 1968, when the university had no formal varsity team, Hansel coached the Shamrock Hilton Club, for which Cone competed while in Houston. In 1959, the University of Houston swim club finished second at the AAU National Championships.

After ending her swimming career, Cone graduated from the University of Maryland in June 1962.

=== Competition highlights ===
In international competition, Cone captured two gold medals at the 1959 Pan American Games in Chicago.

Cone continued to excel after the 1956 Olympics, and many consider 1959 the most accomplished year of her swimming career. In early 1959, she won both women's backstroke titles at the American Athletic Union Indoor meet. She broke the world record in the 220 yard backstroke with a time of 2:37.9, defeating defending champion Chris Von Saltza at the National AAU Women's Swimming Championships on July 17, 1959. At the 1959 Pan American games in Chicago, Cone captured the 100-meter backstroke title, establishing a new world record of 1:11.4 on the lead off backstroke leg in the medley relay.

Cone set seven backstroke world records during her career. She set ten American records in the short course consisting of the 100-yard, 150-yard, and 200-yard backstroke events. She set thirteen American records in the long course in the 100-meter, 200-meter, and 220-meter backstroke events, and in one relay.

Cone retired from competitive swimming in 1960. Between 1955 and 1959, she was named to five All American teams in swimming.

=== Marriage and family ===
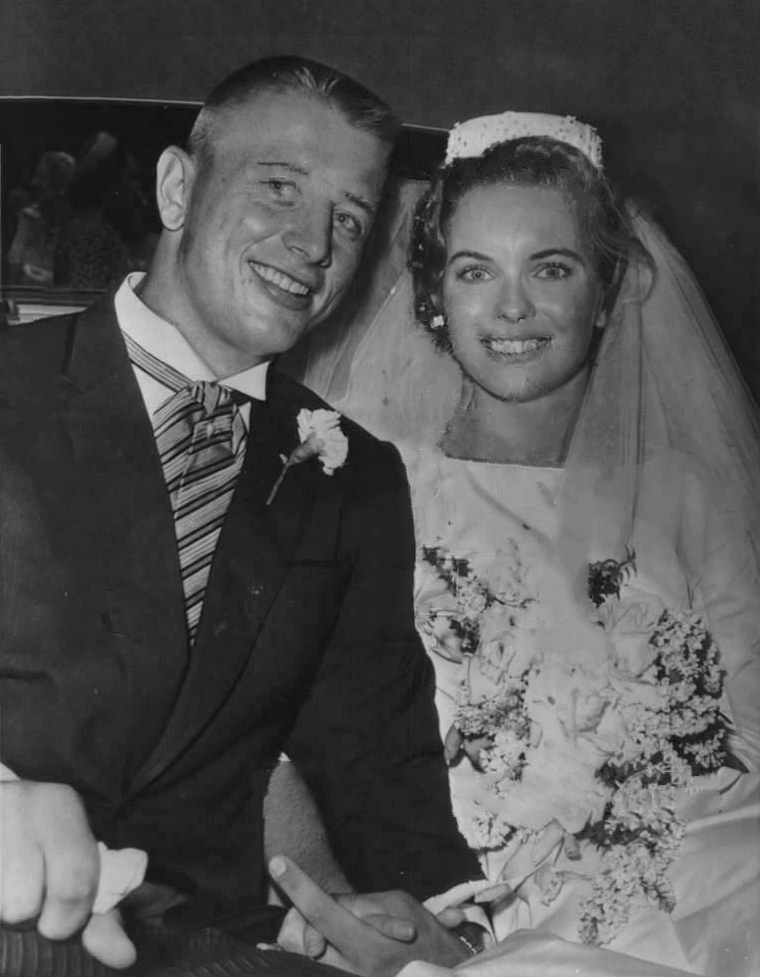
Marrying Al Vanderbush III, June 23, 1962

On June 23, 1962, she married Lt. Albert Vanderbush III, a New Jersey native, and former 1960 captain of the U.S. Army Academy football team, at the First Presbyterian Church in Cone's hometown of Ridgewood, New Jersey. After the wedding, the couple lived in Fort Campbell, Kentucky, where Vanderbush was stationed at the time.

Vanderbush graduated from the Army Academy in 1961, and as an outstanding athlete earned three varsity letters in football and one in baseball. After serving in Korea, Vietnam and Hawaii, he returned to West Point in 1984. For six years, he served as deputy of Intercollegiate Athletics for the Army Academy, before a promotion to director of Intercollegiate Athletics, where he served from 1990 to 1999, later retiring from Army service as a colonel. At least through 2014, the couple lived in Highland Falls, New York, about two miles from the Army Academy, where they raised their two sons.

=== Post-swimming career ===
After failing to qualify for the 1960 Olympic games, Cone retired from swimming and began a career in education. She taught kindergarten for 26 years during some of the time her husband was serving abroad. She stayed close to home, teaching for 18 years at the West Point Elementary school, finally retiring in 2002.

Staying active in her sport after her marriage, she competed and trained in United States Masters Swimming.

=== Honors ===
In 1984, Cone was inducted into the International Swimming Hall of Fame, and was the first University of Houston athlete on the cover of Sports Illustrated. Gaining a degree of celebrity during her swimming years, she appeared on the cover of several magazines, and was invited to audition for a screen test and pursue work as a model. In her former local community, she was made a member of the Ridgewood High School Hall of Fame in Ridgewood, New Jersey.

== See also ==
- List of members of the International Swimming Hall of Fame
- List of Olympic medalists in swimming (women)
- List of University of Houston people
- World record progression 4 × 100 metres medley relay
