= A Sunny Morning =

2012 film

- Directed by: Jacob Proctor
- Written by: Jacob Proctor; Glenda Robinson
- Produced by: Teodora Shaleva
- Starring: Sophia Myles; Charlie Cox
- Cinematography: Trevor Speed
- Edited by: Sam Turner
- Distributed by: Numa Film
- Release date: 12 May 2012
- Country: England
- Language: English

A Sunny Morning is a 2012 British drama film written and directed by Jacob Proctor and starring Sophia Myles and Charlie Cox. It was released on 12 May 2012.

== Cast ==
- Sophia Myles as Grace
- Charlie Cox as Adam

== Release ==
A Sunny Morning was released on 12 May 2012 at the Rhode Island International Film Festival, US.

== Reception ==
After moving on through several film festivals on the circuit and winning several awards, the film was praised by reviewers and critics, some of whom named it "an acting masterpiece" and that Cox and Myles "pulled the film together in a positive emotionally touching gem of a movie".
