= Elżbieta Gellner =

Polish swimmer

Personal information
- Born: 3 February 1935 (age 91) Katowice, Poland

Sport
- Sport: Swimming

Elżbieta Gellner (born 3 February 1935) is a Polish former swimmer. She competed in the women's 100 metre backstroke at the 1956 Summer Olympics.
