= November 1st (film) =

2019 film

- Directed by: Charlie Manton
- Written by: Charlie Manton
- Produced by: Teodora Shaleva
- Starring: Lindsay Duncan; Sophia Myles; Clint Dyer; Thom Ashley
- Cinematography: Molly Manning Walker
- Edited by: Celina Øier
- Distributed by: Numa Film
- Release date: 4 October 2019
- Country: England
- Language: English

November 1st is a 2019 British drama film written and directed by Charlie Manton and starring Lindsay Duncan, Sophia Myles, Clint Dyer and Thom Ashley. It was released on 4 October 2019 at the Sioux City International Film Festival. The film was shortlisted for the 2020 BAFTA Awards.

== Cast ==
- Lindsay Duncan as Bonnie
- Sophia Myles as Caroline
- Clint Dyer as Carl
- Thom Ashley as Arnie
- Lisa Loops as Maid
- Michelle Nali as Witness
- David Thomas Coulter as Civilian
- Lesley Hilton as Prison Worker
- Dean Horler as Prison Worker
- Nathan L Weller as Media Reporter

== Release ==
The film was released on 4 October 2019 at the Sioux City International Film Festival, Iowa, USA.

== Reception ==
The Independent Critic lauded Duncan's performance calling it "simply extraordinary."

== Accolades ==
November 1st won many awards, including Best Film at the BAFTA/LA Student Film Awards, at the Brussels Short Film Festival, at the Lucca Film Festival, at the Münster Film Festival and also at the This Is England Film Festival. Lindsay Duncan won Best Actress at the 24FPS International Short Film Festival and Sophia Myles won Best Supporting Actress at the Overcome Film Festival. The film was named the "Best of the Fest" at the Snake Alley Festival of Film in Iowa, US.
