= Blackwood (2013 film) =

2014 film by J. S. Hill

- Official poster
- Directed by: Adam Wimpenny
- Written by: J.S. Hill
- Produced by: Adam Morane-Griffiths
- Starring: Ed Stoppard; Sophia Myles; Russell Tovey; Paul Kaye
- Cinematography: Dale McCready
- Production company: Wildcard Films
- Release dates: October 2013 (London Film Festival); 1 August 2014
- Running time: 90 minutes
- Country: United Kingdom
- Language: English

Blackwood is a 2013 horror-thriller film written by J. S. Hill and directed by Adam Wimpenny. It stars Ed Stoppard, Sophia Myles and Russell Tovey. The film premiered at the 2013 London Film Festival and was released on 1 August 2014.

== Synopsis ==
Following a shattering emotional breakdown, a college professor relocates to the countryside with his family. After a seemingly good start, he is plagued by spectral visions and investigates a local mystery that has put him and his family in danger.

== Cast ==
- Ed Stoppard as Ben Marshall
- Sophia Myles as Rachel Marshall
- Russell Tovey as Jack
- Isaac Andrews as Harry Marshall
- Paul Kaye as Father Patrick
- Greg Wise as Dominic
- Joanna Vanderham as Jessica
- Sebastian Dunn as Dr. Parr
- Duncan Pow as Lee
- Luke Brandon Field as Jay
- Harry Burton as Professor York
- Alan Drake as Grimes
- Eileen Nicholas as Olivia Warner

== Reception ==
The film was generally not well received by critics and received a rating of 40% on Rotten Tomatoes.
