= Colditz (2005 TV series) =

2005 UK television drama miniseries

- Written by: Peter Morgan; Richard Cottan
- Directed by: Stuart Orme
- Starring: Damian Lewis; Tom Hardy; Sophia Myles; Laurence Fox; James Fox; Timothy West; Jason Priestley; Guy Henry
- Composer: Richard Harvey
- Country of origin: United Kingdom
- Original language: English
- No. of episodes: 2

Production
- Executive producers: Justin Bodle; Andy Harries; Francis Hopkinson
- Producer: Stephen Smallwood
- Production company: Granada Television

Original release
- Network: ITV
- Release: 27 May 2005

Colditz is a two-part 2005 television drama miniseries, based on the book Colditz: The Definitive History by Henry Chancellor, and the Channel 4 television series Escape from Colditz. It is not claimed to be historically accurate. It features an ensemble cast headlined by Damian Lewis and Sophia Myles and was directed by Stuart Orme. The screenplay was written by Peter Morgan and Richard Cottan.

== Synopsis ==
The series tells several stories of various, mostly British, prisoners of war in the Second World War and their attempts to escape Colditz. The first episode features a fictionalised account of an actual event when three inmates Dick Lorraine, John 'Bosun' Crisp, and the 'Medium Sized Man', Flt Lt Dominic Bruce OBE MC AFM KSG MA RAF attempted to escape using the castle sewers. In reality the escape team were discovered when they attempted to exit a manhole. The Germans threatened to throw grenades down into the sewer chamber and, as the escapees could not reverse back up the sewer pipe, they were forced to surrender. They were immediately put in front of a firing squad, but unlike the fictional TV account, the guards did not fire. Just before the order was to be given, Bruce lost his temper and approached the officer in charge, Eggers, saying "you can shoot us, but after the war we'll hang you". Eggers stood the squad down. An account of this escape can be found in Reel Five of the oral history version given by Flt. Lt. Bruce to be found in the Imperial War Museum Sound Archive.

== Cast ==
- Damian Lewis – Cpl. / Lt. Nicholas McGrade
- Tom Hardy – 2nd Lt. Jack Rose
- Sophia Myles – Lizzie Carter
- Laurence Fox – Capt. Tom Willis
- James Fox – Lt. Colonel Jimmy Fordham
- Timothy West – Bunny Warren
- Jason Priestley – Flying Officer Rhett Barker
- Guy Henry – Capt. Edward Sawyer
- Robert Whitelock – Flt. Lt. Venning
- Charles Kay – Colonel Henry Cartwright, Military Attaché in Switzerland
- Juliet Howland – Mary
- Scott Handy – Mullan
- Alex Avery – Collins
- Eve Myles – Jill
- Robert Cambrinus – Tony de Jongh
- Charles Edwards – Ellways (MI9 Officer)

== Release ==
As of November 2010, Colditz has been released on DVD and Blu-ray in Region 1 and on DVD in Region 2 and 6.

== Awards ==
In 2006, it won the BAFTA Television Craft Award for best sound design in a fiction or entertainment.

== See also ==
- Oflag IV-C#Television and TV movies
