= Outlander (film) =

2008 American film by Howard McCain

- Promotional release poster
- Directed by: Howard McCain
- Written by: Dirk Blackman; Howard McCain
- Produced by: Chris Roberts; Barrie M. Osborne; John Schimmel
- Starring: Jim Caviezel; Sophia Myles; Jack Huston with Ron Perlman and John Hurt
- Cinematography: Pierre Gill
- Edited by: David Dodson
- Music by: Geoff Zanelli
- Production companies: Virtual Studios; Ascendant Pictures; Rising Star Productions; VIP Medienfonds 4 GmbH & Co. KG
- Distributed by: Third Rail Releasing (United States)
- Release dates: July 11, 2008 (Latvia); January 23, 2009 (U.S.)
- Running time: 115 minutes
- Countries: United States; Germany; France; Czech Republic
- Languages: English; Icelandic; Latin
- Budget: $47 million
- Box office: $7 million

Outlander is a 2008 science fiction action film written and directed by Howard McCain, starring Jim Caviezel, Sophia Myles, Jack Huston, John Hurt, and Ron Perlman. The plot is loosely based on the Anglo-Saxon epic poem Beowulf, adapted to a science fiction backstory involving a spaceship crashing in Iron Age Norway. The film grossed US$7 million compared to a budget estimated at $47 million.

== Plot ==
In 709 AD, a spacecraft crashes in a lake in Vendel-era Scandinavia. The only surviving occupant – a humanoid alien – retrieves a distress beacon and a computer which explains that he is on Earth, a "seed" colony that his people have abandoned. The computer downloads the local Norse language and culture directly into his brain. The spaceman soon finds a recently destroyed village, where he is captured by Wulfric, a warrior from another village.

Wulfric takes him to the fortified village of King Hrothgar, father of Freya, who he hopes will marry future king Wulfric. Hrothgar is concerned that Gunnar, chieftain of the destroyed village, will assume it was Wulfric's doing, as Wulfric's father (Hrothgar's predecessor) had been allegedly killed by Gunnar. Wulfric interrogates the "outlander", who identifies himself as Kainan, claiming he is from the north, and states that he is hunting a dragon. The village is attacked that night by an unseen creature, which kills several men. Kainan identifies it as a "Moorwen", a predatory creature which caused his ship to crash and now will hunt men and animals alike. When Kainan is taken with a hunting party to find the Moorwen, he kills a gigantic bear that had slain some of the hunters, proving himself to the others who begin treating him as a part of their tribe.

Gunnar and his men attack the settlement, retreating after both sides suffer casualties. They soon return, pursued by the Moorwen, and enter the safety of the village. Kainan devises a plan to build a huge pit just inside the village entrance, fill it with whale oil and leave wooden shields floating on the surface.

Freya becomes increasingly attracted to Kainan. He explains to her the Moorwen's origin—Kainan's people invaded its land (planet), slaughtered it in the billions and built a colony there. This Moorwen, now the last of its kind, massacred everyone in the colony, including Kainan's wife and child. When his "ship" returned to the colony, the Moorwen snuck onboard and later caused the crash. After listening to Kainan's tale, Freya gives him a family sword, saying she was told that she would know what man to give it to.

Kainan and Wulfric lure the Moorwen to the village. They cross the oil pit by running on the shields, but the Moorwen falls into the pit, and the oil is set on fire. The Moorwen is injured but nevertheless bursts out, kills several people including Gunnar, and then escapes. Meanwhile, an offspring of the Moorwen sneaks into the hall where the women and children are hiding through the village well. Erik, the orphaned boy that Kainan has begun looking after, alerts Hrothgar, who is killed as the women and children escape. Kainan realizes that they need stronger weapons to kill the Moorwen. Kainan, Freya, and the newly crowned King Wulfric return to the lake to retrieve fragments of metal from Kainan's submerged ship. While Kainan is underwater, the young Moorwen attacks the boat, taking Freya. Kainan and Wulfric return to the village, where the fragments are soon forged into weapons by the village smith Boromir. Kainan and Wulfric then assemble a small hunting party before descending the well into the Moorwen lair.

Freya awakens on a pile of bodies in the underground lair. As the young Moorwen moves toward Freya, it is distracted by the sound of Kainan's hunting party. Many of the hunters are killed by the young Moorwen, though Boromir manages to blind it before succumbing to his wounds. When it returns to attack Freya, Kainan and Wulfric pass her one of the new swords, with which she slays the young Moorwen. The cave exits to a high waterfall, where the adult Moorwen attacks. It seriously wounds Wulfric before Kainan engages it in battle. When Freya joins in, Kainan is able to knock the Moorwen over the cliff's edge to its death. Freya and Kainan return to Wulfric's side, where he passes the kingship to Kainan just before he dies.

Kainan tells Freya to wait for the rest of the warriors and kisses her before he heads back to the lake. Night falls as Kainan retrieves some items from his ship, says goodbye to his wife's submerged coffin, then destroys his distress beacon just as Freya sees a rescue spaceship approaching, leading her to believe that Kainan was sent by the gods. The rescue ship departs without Kainan, who stays as king, weds Freya, and adopts Erik as his own son.

== Cast ==
- Jim Caviezel as Kainan, an alien warrior.
- Sophia Myles as Freya, daughter of Rothgar
- Jack Huston as Wulfric, nephew and heir of Rothgar, King of Heorot
- John Hurt as Rothgar, King of Heorot
- Cliff Saunders as Boromir, Heorot's smith
- Ron Perlman as Gunnar, king of the neighbouring village
- Aidan Devine as Einar
- Bailey Maughan as Erik, a young orphan

== Production ==
In 1998, director Howard McCain met screenwriter Dirk Blackman, who re-designed a story originally written by McCain in 1992.

According to McCain, Renny Harlin expressed interest in directing Outlander. For a time, the film was to be financed independently, with effects designed by Weta Workshop and to be filmed on the South Island of New Zealand, but this plan fell aside. By 2004, production company Ascendant Pictures and producer Barrie M. Osborne had stepped in with financing.

In May 2005, The Weinstein Company announced the addition of the project to its distribution slate, with McCain as director. At that time Karl Urban was in talks to star in the film, but Jim Caviezel emerged as the lead when production was finally announced in September 2006. By this point, the production had settled on Halifax and Nine Mile River, Nova Scotia, Canada, with a 10-week shooting schedule beginning in October 2006. Some scenes were filmed in the Bay of Islands, Newfoundland, as it possessed an inlet that served as a fjord for the film. Photography was completed on 5 January 2007.

The conceptual design was shaped by Iain McCaig, whose Ninth Ray Studios helped set up concept art, storyboarding, animatronics, and set design. Costume designer Debra Hanson hand crafted costumes for the main characters, using designs from Ninth Ray, while she provided leftover costumes from her previous collaboration, Beowulf & Grendel, to dress the extras.

Kainan's opponent, the creature called the Moorwen, was designed by creature designer Patrick Tatopoulos for free for the film. "Moorwen" was a play on the word Morlock from H. G. Wells' The Time Machine. The director and the creature designer created the Moorwen to be like an animal, only perceived as a monster by those who were threatened. McCain praised Tatopoulos: "He brought the right amount of fierceness, sensuality, the sense of personality and a sentient kind of intelligence to [the Moorwen] that was perfect." The creature was designed to possess bioluminescence, using light to draw its prey.

For the film, McCain constructed a replica Viking village and ship. The ship was modeled after the Oseberg ship and deployed at Little Port, Newfoundland for filming as a funeral pyre. The Viking village was built on a farm near Nine Mile River, Nova Scotia. The crew logged their own trees, and hired a logging crew and truck to construct a parapet 800 feet long and 20 feet tall. The Viking village took three months to build.

== Reception ==
=== Critical reception ===
On Rotten Tomatoes, the film holds an approval rating of 37% based on 62 reviews, with a weighted average rating of 4.90/10. The site's critical consensus reads, "Schizophrenic in subject and lackluster in execution, Outlander might have trouble finding the cult audience for which it was built." On Metacritic, the film has a weighted average score of 40 out of 100, based on 11 critics, indicating "mixed or average reviews".

Ray Bennett of The Hollywood Reporter said, "it's entertaining nonsense with major league special effects, larger-than-life characters and inventive monsters that draw on the 'Aliens' and 'Predator' models, being terrifying but also vaguely sympathetic."

Derek Elley of Variety said that the "script tries to build up a full range of heroic characters in conflict but is let down by workaday dialogue and direction that doesn't conjure any special atmosphere. Only Hurt, who can always be relied on to turn the most basic dialogue metal into something resembling gold, comes close to giving the picture any verbal style. But despite a couple OK action sequences, the first hour largely passes before delivering any serious mano a mano with the mean Moorwen... Color processing has a cold, grungy look in daytime exteriors and a slightly fuzzy, amber-drenched look in interiors. Geoff Zanelli's score is off-the-shelf heroic-action wallpaper. However, production and costume design do sport an impressive authenticity, and effects work does the job in a genre-ish way. Alas, Patrick Tatopoulos' monster simply recalls elements of other, more famous aliens."

=== Box office ===
Outlander had a limited release on January 23, 2009, at 81 theaters and grossed $59,581 at the U.S. box office in its opening weekend. As of August 2009, it had earned $166,003 in the U.S. and $6,192,098 worldwide, against a reported budget of $47 million.
