= Pam Singleton =

Australian swimmer

Personal information
- Born: 1936 (age 89–90)

Sport
- Sport: Swimming

Pam Singleton (born 1936) is an Australian former swimmer. She competed in the women's 100 metre backstroke at the 1956 Summer Olympics.
