= Maureen Murphy (swimmer) =

American swimmer (1939–2019)

Personal information
- Full name: Maureen Elizabeth Murphy
- National team: United States
- Born: March 23, 1939 Portland, Oregon, U.S.
- Died: January 22, 2019 (aged 79) Lake Oswego, Oregon, U.S.
- Height: 5 ft 10 in (1.78 m)
- Weight: 170 lb (77 kg)

Sport
- Sport: Swimming
- Strokes: Backstroke
- Club: Multnomah Athletic Club

Maureen Elizabeth Murphy (March 23, 1939 – January 22, 2019) was an American competition swimmer who represented the United States at the 1956 Summer Olympics in Melbourne, Australia. Murphy competed in the women's 100-meter backstroke, and finished fifth overall in the event final with a time of 1:14.1.
