= Stan Tinkham =

American swimmer and coach

- Tinkham, as typically well dressed coach with whistle lanyard around neck

Biographical details
- Born: November 24, 1931; Yankton, South Dakota
- Died: April 9, 2019 (aged 87); Rockville, Maryland
- Education: University of North Carolina

Playing career
- 1949-1953: University of North Carolina; Coach Ralph Casey
- Positions: freestyle, individual medley relays

Coaching career (HC unless noted)
- 1954-1958: Walter Reed Hospital Team
- 1956: U.S. Women's Olympic Team; Head coach
- 1958-1988: Northern Virginia Aquatic Club

Accomplishments and honors

Awards
- International Swimming Hall of Fame 1989; CSCAA Swim Coach Hall of Fame 2002

Stanley Dean Tinkham was an American competitive swimmer and Hall of Fame coach who swam as an All-American for the University of North Carolina and coached the Walter Reed Army hospital team, where he led his swimmers to first place finishes in every event at the Senior National Championships at least once between 1954-1958. He was the Head Coach for the 1956 U.S. Melbourne Olympic Women's team, and later founded and coached the Northern Virginia Aquatic Club from 1959 through the 1980s, where he mentored many more female champions. The 1956 Melbourne Olympians he had formerly coached on the Walter Reed Hospital team included 400 freestyler Susan Gray McGreivy, butterfly gold medalist Shelley Mann, butterfly bronze medalist Mary Jane Sears, and Betty Brey who swam with the silver medal women's 4x100 freestyle relay team.

== Early swimming and education ==
Tinkham was born November 24, 1931, in Yankton, South Dakota. From an athletic family, his brother Carleton later swim for American University. At seven, Tinkham's family moved to the Washington D.C. area, and he soon started his swimming career with the team at the Ambassador Hotel which had a pool suitable for competition and training. By the age of 14, Tinkham was 5’11” and weighed 165, making his athletic potential exceptional for his age.

In 1949, Tinkham broke the 1939 District AAU Men's Senior breaststroke record with a time of 1:11.2. As one of the Ambassador Club's most outstanding competitors, he swam in the AAU National Championships against the nation's best at only 14, and soon held District of Columbia age-group records for Junior competition in freestyle, backstroke, and breast, before the inauguration of the butterfly stroke. By July 1947, while still representing the Ambassador Hotel swim club and training under Head Coach Bill Armstrong, Tinkham was a district record holder in breaststroke competition, and held Senior AAU breaststroke titles in both Indoor and Outdoor competition. Sometimes known as the butterfly breaststroke, Tinkham's mastery of the stroke in high school and college and its above water sweeping arm recovery may have later given him greater insight into coaching competitive butterfly in the 1956 Olympics.

Known as the "boy wonder" by the Ambassador team, Tinkham also helped in recruiting additional team members, a skill he would later continue to develop as a coach for a community team. In the summer of 1947, Tinkham's best time for the 100-yard breaststroke was 1:09.6, with the world record in the event then at 1:02.7.

=== Western High School ===
As a competitor for Washington D.C.'s Western High, he was an Eastern High School title winner, and a recipient of All-American honors in 1947-8 in the 150 individual medley. At the Southern Scholastic Swim Championship in Chapel Hill, NC, as a multi-stroke swimmer, Tinkham swam a 1:44.7 for the 150-yard medley, winning the event. Tall and muscular at around six feet, Tinkham was an outstanding swimmer, but also played tackle for Western's Football team, earning All High School team recognition by his Senior year. As a 17-year old senior with ten years as a swimming competitor, Tinkham had accumulated over 100 medals in his career and over 20 trophies. Having access to a quality education, Western High was considered one of America's outstanding College Preparatory High Schools and had many outstanding alumni, but was discontinued and the building, after remodeling, currently houses Duke Ellington School of the Arts.

== University of North Carolina ==
Tinkham attended and swam for the University of North Carolina Chapel Hill on a scholarship. He swam as a Freshman under Coach Bob Ousley. Buddy Baarcke, a North Carolina teammate and conference backstroke champion, later became an exceptional coach. The Bob Ousley award was created by the American Swimming Coaches Association in Ousley's honor.

Swimming varsity under Coach Dick Jamerson, Tinkham was one of UNC's best sprinters, and soon enjoyed All-American honors. From his Freshman year to February of his Senior year, Tinkham swam on undefeated teams at North Carolina, winning eight meets as a Freshman, twelve meets as a Sophomore, twelve as a Junior, and six as a Senior through February 1953. The team completed the 1952-3 season undefeated, making the North Carolina swim team undefeated in the four years that Tinkham competed. As a Senior serving as a Co-Captain in 1953, Tinkham swam under Head Coach Ralph Casey, who believed Tinkham's North Carolina team, with an undefeated 38-0 four-season record nearing the end of the 1952-53 season, was very likely the best he had ever coached. North Carolina, in Coach Casey's opinion, was among the top five intercollegiate teams in the nation that year. In the late 1953 Season, the team held nearly every Southern Conference record except for the 220 and 440-yard freestyle and the 200-yard backstroke. By his Senior year, Tinkham was an outstanding freestyle sprinter and a member of Freestyle and Medley Relay teams that had won the Conference Championship. Tinkham graduated North Carolina with a Bachelor of Arts in June 1953, majoring in Communications.

== Coaching ==
=== 1956 U.S. Olympic women's coach ===
Tinkham was chosen as a coach for the 1956 Women's Olympic team, when several of his Walter Reed women swimmers qualified for the 1956 Olympic Swim team.

At the 1956 Melbourne Olympics, he was head coach for the U.S. Women's team. A remarkable success, his 1956 Women's Olympic squad scored more points than any other Women's Olympic team in the history of the games. Shelley Mann was one of his most outstanding 1956 Olympic swimmers, and captured a gold medal in the 100 fly, becoming the first official gold medalist in the new stroke. The 1956 Olympic women that year took six of the combined eleven medals won by the U.S. Men's and Women's teams.

Other 1956 Olympic team members coached by Tinkham included Betty Brey Mullen and Mary Jane Sears and non-medalist Susan Douglas Gray. Sears captured a bronze medal in the 100 butterfly, giving the American women a clean sweep of the event in its inaugural year. Tinkham also coached the 1956 Women's team in the Pan American Games.

=== Walter Reed hospital Swim team ===
Immediately after his college graduation, as a youthful army private at 24, Tinkham assumed the Head Coaching position of the Walter Reed Army Hospital team from 1954-1958 taking over for James Campbell, a civilian. Founded in 1952, Walter Reed's women's team had excelled early and placed first in the National Championships that year under Campbell, and had two 1952 Olympic qualifiers. When Campbell resigned after a strong disagreement with a parent, Walter Reed's base Commander appointed Tinkham as head coach. Prior to his coaching at Walter Reed, Tinkham had acquired no prior swim coaching experience, though he had been an exceptional High School and college swimmer, who had competed in all three competitive strokes. The Walter Reed program offered one of the top programs for their women's team with a modern pool, then considered quite large, at 50x40 feet, though as it was also used for patient therapy, its water temperature may have been a bit high for competition. Though many had limited expectations due to his youth, Tinkham's women's teams owned the U.S. Senior National Championships from 1954-8. His swimmers set multiple American and world records in individual events and demonstrating the teams's depth, were particularly accomplished in relays. The team could enter over thirty swimmers in a given meet.

In 1955, his Walter Reed swimmer Shelly Mann won the 100-yard freestyle final in the National AAU Senior Women's Championships in 58.7 seconds. The win was Walter Reed's third consecutive AAU Senior Women's championship, and they accumulated 95 points. Other outstanding Walter Reed women's swimmers included Betty Brey, a 1956 Olympic 4 x 100 freestyle competitor, and Doug Grey. In 1959 Walter Reed decided to end the evening practice time used by their swim club to allow their own members to swim, which eventually led to the end of their swim program. Tinkham was also the founder of the summer program for the Montgomery County Swim League (MCSL), where many high schoolers would train and improve their swimming, and to in which future Olympian Katie Ledecky would later get involved at an early age.

=== Northern Virginia Aquatic Club ===
When Walter Reed chose not to continue their swim team, he founded the Northern Virginia Aquatic Club in Arlington, Virginia, which in July, 1960 began practice in a new pool originally located on Lee Highway in lower Cherrydale. The new 25-yard pool on Lee Highway and the Northern Virginia club was started by Tinkham with two business associates. In early 1959, Tinkham coached the Potomac Association Swim Club which practiced at a local YMCA and consisted largely of former Walter Reed Swimmers. Tinkham would merge most of the Walter Reed swimmers, first into the Potomac Swim Club, and then into his Northern Virginia Club. One of his early stars included Robyn Johnson and her sister Sue, a freestyle sprinter and 1961 All American, who held a 56.6 time for the 100-yard freestyle. Robyn, at 16, held the women's outdoor 100-meter freestyle title in 1961, and was an All-American in freestyle that year. Many of his subsequent swimmers achieved at the national level. Tinkham coached the club at least through the 1970s, likely until the Lee Highway pool closed its doors in 1988. At this time, Tinkham's exact date of retirement as a swim coach has not been found in sources.

=== Coaching style ===
Tinkham was considered outstanding at teaching stroke technique, and may have developed a natural understanding of the three competitive strokes as a gifted multi-stroke medley swimmer in high school and as an All American competitor at the University of North Carolina. He was considered particularly skilled at teaching breaststroke technique, a stroke in which he had competed and excelled during his High School years. His temperament kept him in good stead with his team, and he was considered to have effective interpersonal skills with comparisons to Hall of Fame Coach Peter Daland of the University of Southern California. Tinkham was exceptional in his ability to motivate his swimmers who were able to bring out their best performances at critical meets.

In service to the swimming community, he was the inaugural President of the Coaches Association in the District of Columbia. He was a Vice President of the Amateur Athletic Union for the District of Columbia, and served as an American Athletic Union Swim Committee member for the National organization. He was a National Chair of Long Distance Swimming.

He married Caroline Tinkham around 1972.

Tinkham died on April 9, 2019 in suburban Rockland, Maryland, about 35 miles North of where he had coached the North Virginia Aquatic Club. He had been suffering with Alzheimers for a number of years. He was survived by his wife Caroline, six children and eleven grandchildren. A memorial service was held in Chevy Chase, Maryland, at All Saints Church on the early afternoon of April 26, 2019.

=== Honors ===
Tinkham was inducted into the International Swimming Hall of Fame in 1989. He was made a member of the College Swimming Coaches Association Hall of Fame in 2002.
