= Tristan & Isolde (film) =

- Theatrical release poster
- Directed by: Kevin Reynolds
- Written by: Dean Georgaris
- Produced by: Moshe Diamant; Lisa Ellzey; Giannina Facio; Elie Samaha
- Starring: James Franco; Sophia Myles; Rufus Sewell
- Cinematography: Arthur Reinhart
- Edited by: Peter Boyle
- Music by: Anne Dudley
- Production companies: Scott Free Productions; Franchise Pictures
- Distributed by: 20th Century Fox (North America and most international territories); Kinowelt (Germany); Bioscop (Czech Republic)
- Release dates: January 13, 2006 (United States); April 21, 2006 (United Kingdom); May 4, 2006 (Czech Republic); May 18, 2006 (Germany)
- Running time: 125 minutes
- Countries: United Kingdom; United States; Germany; Czech Republic
- Language: English
- Budget: $30 million
- Box office: $28 million

Tristan & Isolde is a 2006 epic romantic drama film directed by Kevin Reynolds and written by Dean Georgaris based on the medieval romantic legend of Tristan and Isolde. Produced by Ridley Scott (who had been working on an adaptation since the mid-1970s) and Tony Scott, the film stars James Franco and Sophia Myles, alongside a supporting cast featuring Rufus Sewell, Mark Strong, and Henry Cavill. This was Franchise Pictures' last film after the 2004 bankruptcy.

== Plot ==
Set in the Dark Ages after the fall of the Roman Empire, Lord Marke of Cornwall plans to unite the tribes of Britain – Celts, Picts, Angles, Saxons and Jutes – against Irish domination. Lord Aragon of Tantallon Castle leads the treaty negotiations, convinced that Lord Marke is the unifying figure capable of rallying all the tribes behind him. The Irish king, Donachadh, orders an attack on the castle while his wife's funeral is underway and the treaty negotiations are in progress. Lord and Lady Aragon, along with Marke's pregnant wife, are killed, but Marke manages to save their young son, Tristan, and loses the right hand in the process. Marke and his widowed sister, Edyth, welcome Tristan into their home. Tristan clashes with Edyth's son, Melot, but quickly wins the favor of Simon and other boys.

Nine years later, Tristan is a highly skilled warrior, loyal like a son to Marke. One day, Tristan, Melot, and Simon uncover an ancient Roman passage connecting the bridge to the Cornish castle's keep, and they pledge to keep its existence secret. During an Irish raid, Tristan, along with other Cornish warriors, attacks an Irish slave caravan. Simon is killed during the attack. Tristan kills Morholt, the leader of the army, his father's killer, and the betrothed of Donachadh's daughter, Princess Isolde.

Tristan is severely wounded in the fight and believed dead, but he is only suffering the effects of Morholt's poisoned sword. Put out to sea on a funeral boat, Tristan washes up on the shores of Ireland and is found by Isolde and her maid, Bragnae. Isolde conceals him from the Irish and tends to his wounds, using her healing skills to nurse him back to health. Warned by Bragnae not to reveal her true identity, Isolde tells Tristan her name is Bragnae and she is a lady-in-waiting at the court. Isolde and Tristan fall in love and begin a romance. The two lovers separate after Tristan's boat is discovered. Tristan returns to Cornwall. An astonished and overjoyed Marke welcomes Tristan back with open arms. Tristan, however, remains melancholy having parted with the woman who saved him.

Donachadh schemes to weaken Britain by dividing the tribes, proposing a peace treaty that offers Isolde's hand in marriage and valuable lands to the victor of a tournament. Tristan of Aragon wins the tournament on behalf of Marke, unaware Donachadh's daughter is the woman he fell in love with. When Tristan finds out the truth, he is heartbroken and bitter over the lie, but accepts it since her marriage to Marke will end the conflict between their people.

Marke and Isolde are married. He is kind to Isolde and genuinely falls in love with her. Isolde grows fond of Marke, but her heart still belongs to Tristan. Tristan has become withdrawn and distant towards Isolde and Marke, the latter of whom does not understand why; becoming especially concerned when Tristan casually disregards Marke's suggestion and encouragement to find a woman of his own to marry. Tristan tells Isolde how painful it is to see her with Marke, and Isolde tells Tristan that they can be together again, in secret. Tristan is torn between his love for Isolde and his loyalty to Marke, but he eventually gives in to Isolde; they renew their love and begin an affair. The affair is discovered by Lord Wictred, a Saxon chieftain and longstanding dissenter to Marke's leadership. Wictred and Donachadh conspire to use the affair to overthrow Marke, with Wictred getting Marke's throne in exchange.

Marke tells Tristan he believes Isolde is having an affair. Tormented by guilt, Tristan burns down the bridge where he would meet Isolde. After Marke and Isolde's coronation, Tristan attempts to end the affair, but Isolde begs him not to leave her. They are caught embracing by Marke, Donachadh, and the other British kings. Donachadh pretends to be furious that his daughter is being treated as a "whore" and breaks the alliance. Seeing this as Marke's weakness, the other kings also part ways with him. Marke is hurt and furious over Tristan and Isolde's betrayal, but when Isolde explains their history, Marke relents; Tristan is taken to the river and told by Isolde that Marke is letting them and Bragnae leave together. Tristan tells Isolde that if he leaves with her, they will be remembered for all time as those whose love brought down a kingdom. Tristan pushes the boat carrying Isolde and Bragnae away from the shore and runs off to the ensuing battle.

Simultaneously, Melot, who has always been resentful of his uncle's long favoring of Tristan, shows Wictred the hidden Roman passage into the castle. Wictred tells Melot he will become king when Marke is defeated. Once in the passage, however, Wictred stabs Melot and sneaks his army into the castle. Marke and his forces swiftly become trapped between Donachadh's army outside the castle and Wictred's men within.

Tristan sneaks back into the castle via the tunnel, where he finds Melot dying; they reconcile right before Melot passes away. Tristan helps Marke's soldiers secure the castle, becoming mortally wounded in combat with Wictred, whom he still manages to kill. Tristan, Marke and his soldiers emerge, and Marke urges the British kings to aid them in making Britain a single, free nation. Inspired, the British attack Donachadh and his army.

Marke carries Tristan to the river, where they meet Isolde. With his last breath, Tristan tells Isolde: "I don't know if life is greater than death. But love was more than either". Isolde buries Tristan, planting two willows by the grave, which grow intertwined. Isolde then disappears from history, never to be seen again. Marke defeats the Irish, unites Britain, and rules in peace until the end of his days.

== Cast ==
- James Franco as Tristan
  - Thomas Sangster as Young Tristan
- Sophia Myles as Isolde
  - Isobel Moynihan as Young Isolde
- Rufus Sewell as Marke of Cornwall
- David O'Hara as Donnchadh
- Mark Strong as Wictred
- Henry Cavill as Melot
  - Myles Taylor as Young Melot
- Bronagh Gallagher as Bragnae
- Ronan Vibert as Bodkin
- Lucy Russell as Edyth
- JB Blanc as Leon
- Graham Mullins as Morholt
- Leo Gregory as Simon
  - Jack Montgomery as Young Simon
- Dexter Fletcher as Orick
- Richard Dillane as Lord Aragon
- Hans-Martin Stier as Kurseval
- Thomas Morris as Kaye
- Jamie Thomas King as Anwick
- Wolfgang Müller as Rothgar
- Cheyenne Rushing as Lady Serafine
- Barbora Kodetová as Lady Marke
- Marek Vašut as Luther
- Philip O'Sullivan as Paddreggh
- Todd Krammer as Widseth
- Winter Ave Zoli as Widseth's Sister
- Bronwen Davies as Lady Aragon

== Production ==
In the mid-1970s, before the beginning of the filming of The Duellists, Ridley Scott pitched the idea of a film adaptation of the medieval romantic legend of Tristan and Iseult, and he planned to release it as his second film. The project never materialized at the time and Scott pitched the idea of Legend during the filming of The Duellists as a replacement for this project before later signing on as director of Alien after seeing Star Wars. The film was finally released in 2006 with Kevin Reynolds as the director and with Scott as the producer.

== Release ==
=== Box office ===
Tristan & Isolde opened theatrically in 1,845 North American venues on January 13, 2006. In its first weekend, the film earned $6,583,135 and ranked eighth in the domestic box office. The film ended its run on March 30, having grossed $28,047,963.

=== Critical reception ===
The film received mixed reviews from critics. On Rotten Tomatoes, the film has a 31% score based on 121 reviews, with an average rating of 4.90/10. The site's consensus states: "Competent but somewhat static, Tristan & Isolde doesn't achieve the sweeping romanticism that it aims for". Metacritic reports a 49 out of 100 based on 30 reviews, indicating "mixed or average reviews".

Manohla Dargis of The New York Times wrote that "there is something undeniably pleasant about an entertainment like Tristan & Isolde that delivers exactly what it promises, no less, no more", adding that "there is some fairly bloodless fighting and some very chaste lovemaking".

== See also ==
- List of historical films
- Late antiquity
- List of films based on Arthurian legend
- Tristan and Iseult
