= Joseph G. Huntingford =

Maltese architect, civil engineer and urban planner (1926–1994)

Joseph G. Huntingford (1926–1994) was a Maltese architect, civil engineer and urban planner who is known for his Modernist works on the island of Gozo, particularly a number of schools built in the 1950s while he worked with the Department of Public Works. Huntingford graduated in architecture from the Royal University of Malta, and his work shows inspiration from Alison and Peter Smithson.

Between 1951 and 1961, Huntingford was assigned by the Department of Public Works to Gozo, where he was allowed full architectural liberty. He designed a number of schools during this period, most notably the ones of Qala, Għajnsielem, Għarb and San Lawrenz. He also designed the Technical School and Lyceum in Victoria, and primary schools in Xagħra, Żebbuġ and Sannat. The Lyceum in Victoria is currently being converted into a museum.

The Qala Primary School, inaugurated by Prince Philip on 27 April 1960, is considered to be Huntingford's masterpiece, and it has been described as being one of the few buildings in Malta which were in line with the international architectural scene at the time. The Qala school was partially demolished in 2006, prompting strong condemnation from the Chamber of Architects, although significant parts of the building still stand.

Huntingford also designed some non-educational buildings in Gozo, such as the former MMU milk processing plant in Xewkija. The factory's administration building was scheduled as a Grade 2 building in 2017, after the Chamber of Architects campaigned for its preservation. Although the factory itself is to be demolished, the administration building is to be restored and integrated into a new business centre.

Huntingford left his post on Gozo in 1961, when he went to study for a postgraduate degree in urban planning and civic design at the University of Liverpool. In 1962 he was awarded the Order of the British Empire for his work designing educational buildings. In 1963 he became a fellow of the Royal Economic Society and an associate member of the Town Planning Institute. He was the chairman of a number of government boards and committees, including a board set up in 1963 to draft a Town and Country Planning Law (based largely on the British Town and Country Planning Act 1947).
