= Margaret Edwards =

English swimmer (born 1939)

Personal information
- Nationality: British (English)
- Born: 28 March 1939 (age 87)

Sport
- Sport: Swimming
- Strokes: Backstroke
- Club: Heston S.C.
Medal record
Women's swimming
Representing Great Britain
Olympic Games
Bronze medal – third place	1956 Melbourne	100 m backstroke
European Championships - Long Course
Silver medal – second place	1958 Budapest	100 m backstroke
Representing England
Gold medal – first place	1958 Cardiff	440 yd medley relay
Silver medal – second place	1958 Cardiff	110 yd backstroke

Margaret Edwards (born 28 March 1939) is an English former competitive swimmer.

== Early life ==
Edwards was born on 28 March 1939.

She attended Greens Grammar School, in west London, now called The Green School for Girls.

== Swimming career ==
She represented Great Britain at the 1956 Summer Olympics in Melbourne, Australia, where she won a bronze medal in the women's 100-metre backstroke in the time of 1:13.1.

In May 1958 she took part in the Empire Games trials in Blackpool and subsequently competed at the 1958 British Empire and Commonwealth Games in Cardiff, where she won a gold medal and a silver medal in the women's 440-yard medley relay and 110-yard backstroke respectively, while representing England. At the ASA National British Championships she won the 110 yards backstroke title twice (1959, 1961).

== See also ==
- List of Olympic medalists in swimming (women)
