= Patricia Huntingford =

Australian swimmer

Personal information
- Born: 12 July 1940 (age 86)

Sport
- Sport: Swimming

Patricia Huntingford (born 12 July 1940) is an Australian former swimmer. She competed in the women's 100 metre backstroke at the 1956 Summer Olympics.
