= Nathalia Ramos =

American actress (born 1992)

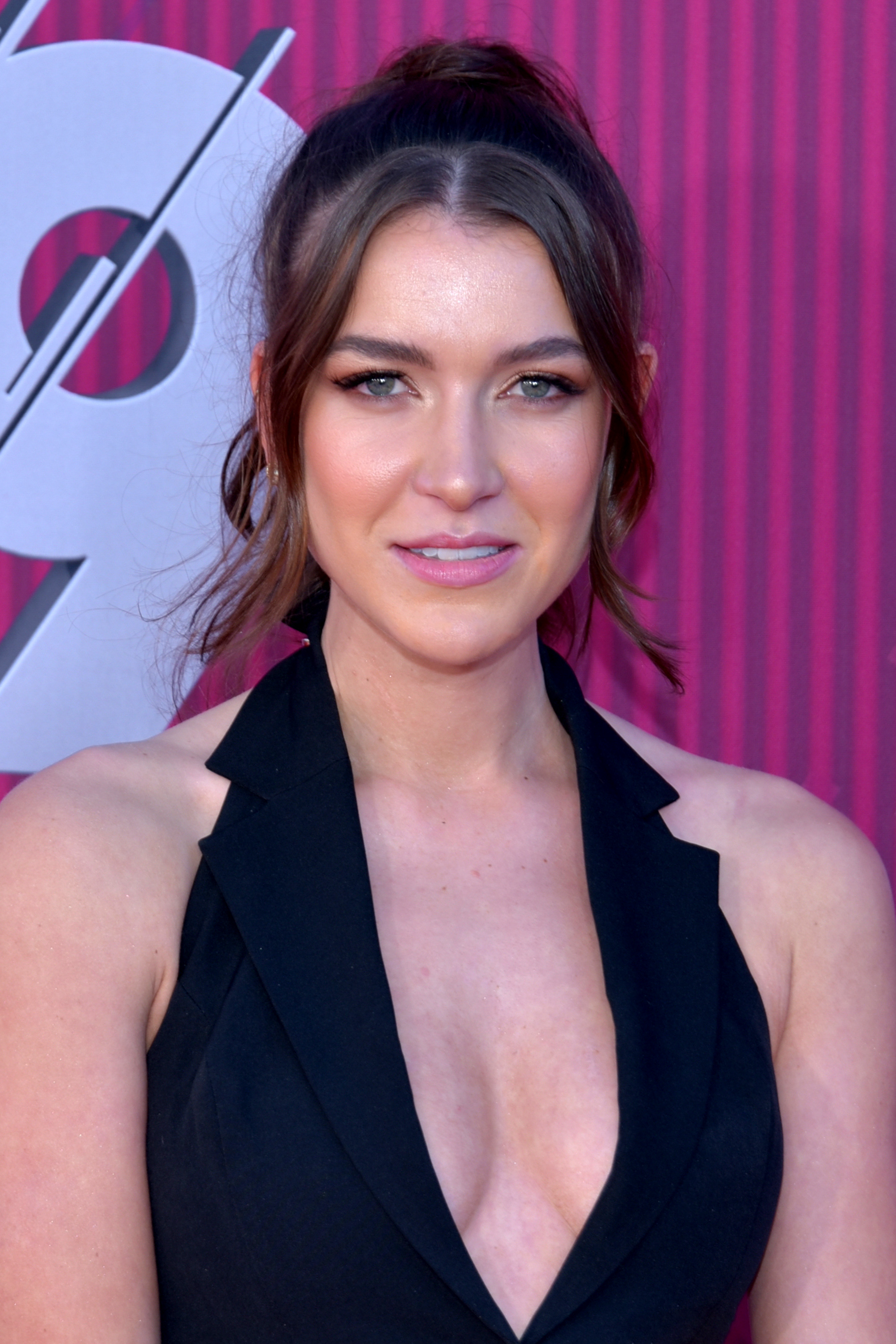
- Ramos in 2019
- Born: Nathalia Norah Ramos Cohen; July 3, 1992 (age 34); Madrid, Spain
- Citizenship: Spain; United States (since 2016)
- Education: University of Southern California
- Occupation: Actress
- Years active: 2005–2016
- Spouse: Derek An (m. 2021)
- Children: 2
- Father: Ivan
- Website: www.nathaliaramos.com

Nathalia Norah Ramos Cohen (born July 3, 1992) is a Spanish-American actress. She is known for her portrayals of Yasmin in the 2007 film Bratz, Jill in the 2013 film The Damned, and lead character Nina Martin in the first two seasons of the 2011 Nickelodeon television series House of Anubis.

== Early life ==
Ramos was born in Madrid, Spain. She is Jewish, as is her mother. Her father is Spanish singer Ivan.

Ramos moved to Melbourne, Australia at age two, then relocated to Miami when she was four, and grew up there. Ramos attended North Beach Elementary, Nautilus Middle School in Miami Beach and briefly attended Miami Beach Senior High during her freshman year. She then moved to Los Angeles and graduated from Beverly Hills High School and attended and graduated from the University of Southern California with a degree in political science with a concentration in South East Asian politics in 2018.

== Career ==
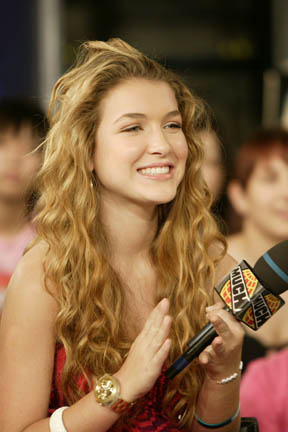
Ramos in 2007

In 2007, Ramos appeared in the theatrical Bratz motion picture, playing the leading role of Yasmin. She made a brief appearance in the music video for Prima J's single "Rockstar" which was a tie-in with the Bratz film and was featured on the film's official soundtrack and provided her voice for the Bratz 4 Real video game. She was featured in an episode of the Nickelodeon series True Jackson, VP, portraying an unpredictable teenage supermodel. She had a role in 31 North 62 East, a psychological thriller film directed by British director Tristan Loraine.

Ramos starred in the Nickelodeon television series House of Anubis for two seasons as the lead character, Nina Martin, who travels to England in order to attend a mysterious boarding school. She stated that she would not return to House of Anubis for a third season due to her concentrating on college.

In 2012, Ramos was cast in the 2013 horror film The Damned (originally titled Gallow's Hill), playing Jill, the daughter of Peter Facinelli's character. In 2016, Ramos headlined the faith-based psychological thriller film Wildflower, playing Chloe, an artistic college student who is traumatized by her past.

== Personal life ==
Ramos became an American citizen on June 2, 2016.

On December 28, 2021, Ramos married Derek An after 13 years of dating and announced on January 14, 2022 their first child was born. Their second child was born in 2024.

== Filmography ==
=== Film ===
Year	Title	Role	Notes	Ref
2007	Bratz	Yasmin		
2009	31 North 62 East	Rachel		
2013	Dean Slater: Resident Advisor	Hanna		
2013	The Damned	Jill Reynolds		
2015	Seoul Searching	Monika		
2016	Wildflower	Chloe Moray		

=== Television ===
Year	Title	Role	Notes	Ref
2005	Arrested Development	Hope Loblaw	Episode: "Notapusy"	
2008	True Jackson, VP	Dakota North	Episode: "Babysitting Dakota"	
2011–2012	House of Anubis	Nina Martin	Main role (seasons 1–2)	
2014	Switched at Birth	Gretchen	Episodes: "Your Body Is a Battleground", "The Scream"	

=== Music video and video game ===
- Video game: Bratz 4 Real (2007), as Yasmin
- Music video promo for Bratz: The Movie: "Rockstar" (2009) by Prima J
