= Mary Sears (swimmer) =

American swimmer (born 1939)

- Sears at 17 in September 1956, shortly prior to Olympics

Personal information
- Full name: Mary Jane Parks
- Born: Mary Jane Sears; May 10, 1939 (age 87) Portsmouth, Virginia, U.S.
- Height: 5 ft 8 in (173 cm)
- Weight: 130 lb (59 kg)
- Spouse: William R. Parks

Sport
- Sport: Swimming
- Strokes: Breaststroke, butterfly
- Club: Walter Reed Swim Club, Washington D.C.
- Coach: James Campbell (Walter Reed); Stan Tinkham (Walter Reed)
Medal record
Women's swimming
Representing the United States
Olympic Games
Bronze medal – third place	1956 Melbourne	100 m butterfly
Pan American Games
Gold medal – first place	1955 Mexico City	4×100 m medley
Silver medal – second place	1955 Mexico City	200 m breaststroke

Mary Jane Parks (née Sears, born May 10, 1939) is an American former competition swimmer, who swam for the Walter Reed Hospital team, and was a 1956 Olympic Bronze medalist in the 100-meter butterfly.

Mary Sears was born on May 10, 1939 at the Naval Hospital in Portsmouth, Virginia to Gladys and Harry E. Sears, then a Lieutenant in the U.S. Navy who would complete his career with the rank of Rear Admiral. Mary grew up in Chevy Chase, Maryland and studied at Bethesda, Maryland's Holton-Arms School, a girls college preparatory school, later attending their Junior College.

== Walter Reed Swim Club ==
Sears began swimming around the age of five, then competed in age group meets at country clubs. By thirteen, she was seriously training at the Walter Reed Swim Club at Washington Army Hospital in Washington, D.C. At Walter Reed, she was coached through 1954 by James Campbell, who would later coach at the University of Pennsylvania, and become an Olympic coach for the U.S. team in 1964. After 1954, she swam at Walter Reed under former University of North Carolina All American and Hall of Fame Coach Stan Tinkham who had excelled in both breaststroke and medley swimming as a High School and Collegiate swimmer. Susan Douglas, known as Dougie, was a class-mate with whom Mary Jane roomed as an upperclassman at Holton-Arms Prep School. Douglas was a teammate with Mary Jane at the Walter Reed Swim Club and also attended the 1956 Melbourne Olympics. The Walter Reed program offered one of the top programs for their women's team with a modern pool, then considered quite large, at 50x40 feet, though as it was also used for patient therapy, its water temperature may have been a bit high for competition. The Walter Reed women's teams dominated the U.S. Senior National Championships from 1954-8 placing first at least once in nearly every event excluding diving competition.

Between 1954 and 1957, Sears competed in six National meets and became the National breast stroke champion in all the competitive distances. She was the American women's Champion in breaststroke from 1954 to 1956, and was an All American each of those years.

In her peak years of training, she would run up to two miles, do weight training, sit-ups for her core, and complete five 2 1/2-hour swim training sessions per week with a 3 and 4 hour swim session on weekends. Prior to a national meet, she often trained three sessions a day, completing 5–10 miles in each session. After retiring from competition, she conducted clinics and presented exhibitions.

== 1956 Melbourne Olympic bronze medal ==
In August 1956, while swimming for Walter Reed Swim Club, she broke her own 200 meter National Breaststroke record with a time of 2:58.2 at the Olympic Swimming trials in Detroit.

Having qualified, she represented the United States at the 1956 Summer Olympics in Melbourne, Australia, where she won a bronze medal for her third-place finish (1:14.4) in the women's 100-meter butterfly, finishing behind fellow Americans Shelley Mann, another Walter Reed swimmer, and Nancy Ramey. Other Walter Reed swimmers who participated in the 1956 Olympics with Mary included Susan Douglas, and Betty Brey. 1956 was the first year Butterfly was held as an individual Olympic event, with the American women taking all three medals. The U.S. Olympic Women's team was coached by her Walter Reed Swim Coach Stan Tinkham that year and took six of the combined eleven medals won by the U.S. Men's and Women's teams.

Sears also competed in the women's 200-meter breaststroke in the '56 Olympics, finishing seventh in the event final with a time of 2:57.2, which broke her own prior American National record set in the trials.

== Swimming career highlights ==
In her swimming career, she won eight AAU titles, four outdoor and four indoor. In the 1955 Pan American Games she took gold in the 4×100 metre medley swimming with Coralie O'Connor, Betty Mullen, and Wanda L. Werner, who was not an Olympian. She also won a silver in the 200 meter breaststroke, one of her signature events.

== Master's swimming ==
In her 30's, Mary Jane continued to swim and train as a recreational competitive swimmer with the D.C. Masters, in the Potomac Valley, part of United States Master's Swimming from around 1972–1978, where she placed very well in her age group, and earned a number of national top ten finishes. She specialized in Breaststroke, the Individual Medley, relays, and occasionally butterfly events. In 1975 and 1978, she was listed as a Master's All American. She held national age group records, and in 1974 held a 200-yard breaststroke record for age group 35-39 of 2:54.7. In relay events, she held two Masters American National Records for the over 35 age group in the 200-yard Medley and Freestyle relays.

== Personal life ==
After retiring from her early years as a competitive swimmer around 1957, on June 18, 1958 she was married to William R. Parks, a former West Point Graduate and graduate Civil Engineering student at Purdue. The couple were married in Washington, D.C., at the Chevy Chase Presbyterian Church, while Parks was a Second Lieutenant and planned to initially reside in Fort Belvoir, Virginia where Parks worked with the Army Corps of Engineers. The couple raised four children. Both Mary and her husband later enjoyed golf as a pastime, as William had been a golf team captain at West Point in 1958.

== See also ==
- List of Olympic medalists in swimming (women)
