= Richard O. Papenguth =

American swimming coach (1903–1970)

Dick Papenguth

Biographical details
- Born: January 24, 1903; Manistee, Michigan
- Died: April 13, 1970 (aged 67); Lafayette, Indiana
- Education: University of Michigan 1949

Playing career
- 1921-1925: University of Michigan; Coach Matt Mann
- Positions: Freestyle swimmer Diver

Coaching career (HC unless noted)
- 1925-1939: Indianapolis Athletic Club
- 1939-1970: Purdue University; Lafayette Swim Club
- 1952: US Olympic Women's Team

Accomplishments and honors

Championships
- Women's team National Champions ('51, 52 Lafayette SC)

Awards
- National Collegiate & Scholastic Swim Trophy (1964, Purdue); Helms Foundation (1962); International Swimming Hall of Fame

Richard Otto "Pappy" Papenguth (January 24, 1903 – April 13, 1970) was an American competitive swimmer for Michigan University and a Hall of Fame swimming coach at Purdue University from 1939 to 1970. He coached the women's swim team at the 1952 Helsinki Olympics to two bronze medals.

Richard Papenguth was born on January 24, 1903, in Manastee, Michigan on the Northern Coast of Lake Michigan, to Gustave Herman and Emma Rosalie Jessin Papenguth. Known as an outstanding local swimmer in Manastee by 1920, at 17 he won third place at the diving contests at Alganac, Michigan.

== University of Michigan competitor ==
Papenguth swam for the University of Michigan in the inaugural days of their swim program, competing primarily between 1923 and 1925. He is credited with bringing Hall of Fame Coach Matt Mann to Michigan in 1923. Mann did not officially start as Head Coach at Michigan until later in Papenguth's tenure as a collegiate swimmer. Papenguth graduated in June 1926, received a varsity letter in swimming and was a member of Phi Kappa Tau fraternity, and Phi Epsilon Kappa, a physical education honorary.

Gaining early coaching experience in his last year at Michigan, he led the Ann Arbor High School swim team to a third-place finish at Lansing's Michigan State High School Championship, and managed the team for most of the season. He married Goldeen Reese on April 24, 1926, in Lucas, Ohio. Reese graduated Michigan State Normal College in 1926 and was an outstanding student.

Papenguth coached at the Indianapolis Athletic Club immediately after college graduation, where he remained from 1926 to 1939. He was one of many outstanding coaches to lead the Indianapolis Club.

== Purdue University ==
He coached at Purdue University from 1939 to 1970, while also coaching the Lafayette Swim Club. Papenguth was named an assistant professor at Purdue in 1948. As there was no varsity women's team during his years as coach, the women of the Lafayette Swim Club consisted of women swimmers attending Perdue. He is considered one of the first swimming coaches to assign his women's teams, long and intense workouts with challenging intervals. Perhaps as a result, his women's teams at Lafayette were national champions in 1951 and 1952.

=== Outstanding swimmers ===
His Purdue varsity men's teams had 25 All-Americans, which included World Record holder and breaststroker Elroy Heidke and breaststroke and freestyler Keith Carter. One of his best-known Purdue competitors was likely American Swimming Coaches (ASCAA) Hall of Fame swimmer Dave Armbruster, who later coached swimming at the University of Iowa for 30 years. One of his most outstanding women swimmers, Canadian Beth Whittall of Canada, who excelled at the 1954 Pan American Games, captured the Lou Marsh Award given to Canada's Athlete of the Year. Additional swimmers he coached during his career included Anne Moss, June and Joanne Fogle, Patty Aspinall, Mary Alice Shivley, Betty Jane Lynch, Bob Dunlap, Randle, Thelma and Major Willis, Helen Lee Smith, Joan Fox, Al Rust, Barbara Cook, Betty Clemens, Everett Brooks, Bob Gawboy, John Dilley, and Morgan Byers.

In service to the swim community, he acted for 30 years as Secretary/Treasurer of the College Coaches Swim Forum. He was a founder of the north–south swimming forum of Fort Lauderdale, Florida which competed annually at Christmas time.

=== Honors ===
Papenguth was a member of the International Swimming Hall of Fame and was named to the Helms Hall Foundation, in 1962. In 1964, he was a recipient of the National Collegiate and Scholastic Swimming trophy, awarded on an annual basis to the person that makes the greatest contribution to the sport of swimming both as a swimmer and as a recreational activity.

Papenguth died in West Lafayette, Indiana on April 13, 1970, after a fatal car accident in front of his home. He was survived by his wife Goldeen Reese, a former schoolteacher, and two children, a boy and a girl. He was a member of the Presbyterian Church and the Tippecanoe County Muscular Dystrophy Association. He particularly enjoyed teaching handicapped children to swim, including hundreds of cerebral palsy victims. He was buried in Grandview Cemetery in his hometown of West Lafayette.
