= New Zealand at the 1958 British Empire and Commonwealth Games =

- CGF code: NZL
- CGA: New Zealand Olympic and British Empire Games Association
- Website: www.olympic.org.nz

in Cardiff, Wales
- Competitors: 66
- Flag bearers: Opening: Malcolm Hahn; Closing:
- Officials: 11
- Medals Ranked 5th: Gold 4 Silver 6 Bronze 9 Total 19

British Empire and Commonwealth Games appearances
- 1930; 1934; 1938; 1950; 1954; 1958; 1962; 1966; 1970; 1974; 1978; 1982; 1986; 1990; 1994; 1998; 2002; 2006; 2010; 2014; 2018; 2022; 2026; 2030

New Zealand at the 1958 British Empire and Commonwealth Games was represented by a team of 66 competitors and 11 officials. Selection of the team for the Games in Cardiff, Wales, was the responsibility of the New Zealand Olympic and British Empire Games Association. New Zealand's flagbearer at the opening ceremony was javelin thrower Malcolm Hahn. The New Zealand team finished fifth on the medal table, winning a total of 19 medals, four of which were gold.

New Zealand has competed in every games, starting with the British Empire Games in 1930 at Hamilton, Ontario.

== Medal tables ==
New Zealand was fifth in the medal table in 1958, with a total of 19 medals, including four gold.

Medal	Name	Sport	Event
Gold	Murray Halberg	Athletics	Men's 3 miles
Gold	Valerie Sloper	Athletics	Women's shot put
Gold	John Morris; Ted Pilkington	Lawn bowls	Men's pairs
Gold	Reg Douglas; Bob Parker	Rowing	Men's coxless pair
Silver	Mary Donaghy	Athletics	Women's high jump
Silver	Les Mills	Athletics	Men's discus throw
Silver	Jennifer Thompson	Athletics	Women's discus throw
Silver	Warren Johnston	Cycling	Men's 10 mile scratch race
Silver	James Hill	Rowing	Men's single scull
Silver	Tessa Staveley	Swimming	Women's 110 yards butterfly
Bronze	Dave Norris	Athletics	Men's triple jump
Bronze	Merv Richards	Athletics	Men's pole vault
Bronze	Neville Scott	Athletics	Men's 3 miles
Bronze	Valerie Sloper	Athletics	Women's discus throw
Bronze	Paddy Donovan	Boxing	Men's lightweight
Bronze	Warwick Dalton	Cycling	Men's 1 km time trial
Bronze	Warwick Dalton	Cycling	Men's 4000 m individual pursuit
Bronze	James Hill; Norm Suckling	Rowing	Men's double scull
Bronze	Philippa Gould	Swimming	Women's 110 yards backstroke

Medals by sport
Sport	Gold medal	Silver medal	Bronze medal	Total
Athletics	2	3	4	9
Rowing	1	1	1	3
Lawn bowls	1	0	0	1
Cycling	0	1	2	3
Swimming	0	1	1	2
Boxing	0	0	1	1
Total	4	6	9	19

Medals by gender
Gender	Gold medal	Silver medal	Bronze medal	Total
Male	3	3	7	13
Female	1	3	2	6
Total	4	6	9	19

== Competitors ==
The following table lists the number of New Zealand competitors participating at the Games according to gender and sport.

Sport	Men	Women	Total
Athletics	13	6	19
Boxing	7	—N/a	7
Cycling	6	—N/a	6
Diving	1	0	1
Fencing	3	2	5
Lawn bowls	7	—N/a	7
Rowing	10	—N/a	10
Swimming	1	4	5
Weightlifting	2	—N/a	2
Wrestling	4	—N/a	4
Total	54	12	66

== Athletics ==
=== Track and road ===
Athlete	Event	Heat		Quarterfinal		Semifinal		Final	
Athlete	Event	Result	Rank (Note: Ranks given are within the heat)	Result	Rank (Note: Ranks given are within the quarterfinal)	Result	Rank (Note: Ranks given are within the semifinal)	Result	Rank
Bill Baillie	Men's 1 mile	4:13.2	6	—N/a				did not advance	
Bill Baillie	Men's 3 miles	—N/a						13:44.4	9
Marise Chamberlain	Women's 100 yards	11.4	3	—N/a		did not advance			
Marise Chamberlain	Women's 220 yards	25.8	2 Q	—N/a		DNS		did not advance	
Murray Halberg	Men's 1 mile	4:09.9	2 Q	—N/a				4:06.6	5
Murray Halberg	Men's 3 miles	—N/a						13:15.0 GR	1st place, gold medalist(s)
Barry Magee	Men's 3 miles	—N/a							15
Barry Magee	Men's 6 miles	—N/a						31:57.2	8
Ray Puckett	Men's 6 miles	—N/a							12
Ray Puckett	Men's marathon	—N/a						2:38:58.8	14
Maurice Rae	Men's 100 yards	9.8	1 Q	9.8	1 Q	9.8	3	did not advance	
Maurice Rae	Men's 220 yards	22.1	1 Q	21.7	2 Q	21.9	6	did not advance	
Barry Robinson	Men's 440 yards	48.9	2 Q	DNF		did not advance			
Neville Scott	Men's 1 mile	4:05.9	3 Q	—N/a				4:11.9	9
Neville Scott	Men's 3 miles	—N/a						13:26.2	3rd place, bronze medalist(s)
Donal Smith	Men's 880 yards	1:52.8	2 Q	—N/a				1:51.5	5
Margaret Stuart	Women's 80 m hurdles	11.1	2 Q	—N/a				11.0	4
Margaret Stuart	Women's 100 yards	11.3	2 Q	—N/a		11.1	6	did not advance	
Beverly Weigel	Women's 100 yards	11.4	4	—N/a		did not advance			
Marise Chamberlain; Margaret Stuart; Beverly Weigel; Mary Donaghy	Women's 4 x 110 yards relay	48.2	2 Q	—N/a				48.3	4

=== Field ===
Athlete	Event	Qualifying		Final	
Athlete	Event	Result	Rank	Result	Rank
Mary Donaghy	Women's high jump			5 ft 7 in (1.70 m)	2nd place, silver medalist(s)
Mary Donaghy	Women's long jump		3 Q	18 ft 11 in (5.77 m)	5
Malcolm Hahn	Men's javelin throw			204 ft 9 1/2 in (62.42 m)	13
Les Mills	Men's discus throw			169 ft 8 1/2 in (51.73 m)	2nd place, silver medalist(s)
Les Mills	Men's shot put			50 ft 2 in (15.29 m)	7
Dave Norris	Men's long jump		Q	23 ft 5 1/2 in (7.15 m)	8
Dave Norris	Men's triple jump		Q	50 ft 8 1/4 in (15.45 m)	3rd place, bronze medalist(s)
Merv Richards	Men's pole vault		4 Q	13 ft 8 in (4.17 m)	3rd place, bronze medalist(s)
Valerie Sloper	Women's discus throw			147 ft 5 in (44.93 m)	3rd place, bronze medalist(s)
Valerie Sloper	Women's shot put			51 ft 0 in (15.54 m) GR	1st place, gold medalist(s)
Jennifer Thompson	Women's discus throw			148 ft 7 in (45.29 m)	2nd place, silver medalist(s)
Jennifer Thompson	Women's shot put			41 ft 11 1/2 in (12.79 m)	5
Beverly Weigel	Women's long jump	18 ft 11 3/4 in (5.78 m)	7 Q	NM	8
Roy Williams	Men's long jump		Q	23 ft 10 in (7.26 m)	6
Roy Williams	Men's triple jump	47 ft 5 3/4 in (14.47 m)	12	did not advance	

== Boxing ==
Athlete	Event	Round of 16	Quarterfinal	Semifinal	Final	Rank
Athlete	Event	Opposition Result	Opposition Result	Opposition Result	Opposition Result	Rank
Maurice Purton	Featherweight	Bye	Collins (WAL); L	did not advance		
Paddy Donovan	Lightweight	—N/a	Sam (SAF); W	McTaggart (SCO); L	Did not advance	3rd place, bronze medalist(s)
Graham Finlay	Light welterweight	Smith (SRH); L	did not advance			
Bevin Weir	Middleweight	Milligan (NIR); L	did not advance			
Edward Morrison	Light heavyweight	—N/a	Madigan (AUS); L	did not advance		

== Cycling ==
=== Road ===
Men's road race

Athlete	Time	Rank
Keith Gant		unplaced
Dick Johnstone		unplaced
Lance Payne	5:23:21.7	11
John Peoples		unplaced

=== Track ===
Men's 1000 m sprint

Athlete	Round 1	Repechage	Round 2	Quarterfinals	Semifinals	Final / BM	
Athlete	Opposition Result	Opposition Result	Opposition Result	Opposition Result	Opposition Result	Opposition Result	Rank
Warren Johnston	Darragh (NIR); Rimple (TTO); W 12.4	—N/a	Skene (WAL); W 12.1, W 12.0	Harrison (ENG); W 13.5, W 12.5	Barton (ENG); D 12.1, L, L	Binch (ENG); L, W 12.4, L	4

Men's 1 km time trial

Athlete	Time	Rank
Warwick Dalton	1:12.6	3rd place, bronze medalist(s)

Men's 4000 m individual pursuit

Athlete	Qualification		Quarterfinals	Semifinals	Final / BM	Rank
Athlete	Time	Rank	Opponent Result	Opponent Result	Opponent Result	Rank
Warwick Dalton	5:09.3	2 Q	Evans (WAL); W 5:08.1	Sheil (ENG); L 5:12.8	Gambrill (ENG); W 5:14.7	3rd place, bronze medalist(s)

Men's 10 miles scratch race

Athlete	Time	Rank
Warwick Dalton		unplaced
Warren Johnston		2nd place, silver medalist(s)

== Diving ==
Athlete	Event	Points	Rank
Len Hodge	Men's 3 m springboard	104.87	6

== Fencing ==
=== Men ===
Individual épée

Individual foil

Athlete	Qualifying pool								Semifinal pool						Final pool								Rank
Athlete	Opposition Result	Opposition Result	Opposition Result	Opposition Result	Opposition Result	Opposition Result	Opposition Result	Wins	Opposition Result	Opposition Result	Opposition Result	Opposition Result	Opposition Result	Wins	Opposition Result	Opposition Result	Opposition Result	Opposition Result	Opposition Result	Opposition Result	Opposition Result	Wins	Rank
Bob Binning	Lund (AUS); L 1 – 5	Hung (HKG); L 3 – 5	Cooke (ENG); L 2 – 5	Malherbe (SAF); L 4 – 5	Andru (CAN); L	Evans (WAL); L	Morrison (SCO); L	0	Did not advance														
Brian Pickworth	R.R.V. Paul (ENG); L 4 – 5	McCowage (AUS); L 4 – 5	Thompson (NIR); L 2 – 5	McCombe (WAL); W 5 – 3	Tully (CAN); W 5 – 2	Richardson (SCO); W 5 – 3	Lee (HKG); W 5 – 1	4	Lund (AUS); L 3 – 5	R.R.V. Paul (ENG); W 5 – 3	Hung (HKG); W 5 – 2	Malherbe (SAF); W 5 – 3	Thompson (NIR); L	3	R.R.V. Paul (ENG); L 0 – 5	Lund (AUS); L 0 – 5	R.R.C. Paul (ENG); W 5 – 4	Preston (WAL); W 5 – 4	Schwende (CAN); W 5 – 3	Hung (HKG); W 5 – 0	McCowage (AUS); L 4 – 5	4	4
Percy Temple	R.R.C. Paul (ENG); L 3 – 5	Marçal (HKG); W 5 – 2	Preston (WAL); W 5 – 4	Schwende (CAN); W 5 – 1	Broadhurst (SCO); W 5 – 2	—N/a	—N/a	4	R.R.C. Paul (ENG); L 1 – 5	McCowage (AUS); L 1 – 5	Preston (WAL); L 4 – 5	Schwende (CAN); L 2 – 5	Cooke (ENG); W	1	did not advance								

Individual sabre

Team events

Athlete	Event	Elimination pool			Final pool				Rank
Athlete	Event	Opposition Result	Opposition Result	Wins	Opposition Result	Opposition Result	Opposition Result	Wins	Rank
Bob Binning; Brian Pickworth; Percy Temple	Team épée	Wales; W 7 – 2	—N/a	1	England; L 1 – 8	Canada; L 0 – 6	Australia; L 1 – 5	0	4
Bob Binning; Brian Pickworth; Percy Temple	Team foil	Canada; W 7 – 2	England; L 2 – 7	1	Australia; L 2 – 7	Wales; L 2 – 5	England; L	0	4
Bob Binning; Brian Pickworth; Percy Temple	Team sabre	Wales; L 3 – 6	England; L 1 – 5	0	did not advance				

=== Women ===
Individual foil

Athlete	Elimination pool								Final pool								Rank
Athlete	Opposition Result	Opposition Result	Opposition Result	Opposition Result	Opposition Result	Opposition Result	Opposition Result	Wins	Opposition Result	Opposition Result	Opposition Result	Opposition Result	Opposition Result	Opposition Result	Opposition Result	Wins	Rank
Enid McElwee	Glen-Haig (ENG); L 1 – 4	McCreath (AUS); L 1 – 4	Waters (WAL); W 4 – 2	Reynolds (SRH); W 4 – 3	Towland (SCO); W 4 – 2	Maries (CAN); L 1 – 4	—N/a	3	Sheen (ENG); L 2 – 4	McCreath (AUS); L 3 – 4	Glen-Haig (ENG); W 4 – 3	Sacco (SAF); W 4 – 0	Mitchell (NZL); W 4 – 1	Maries (CAN); W 4 – 1	O'Brien (AUS); L 3 – 4	4	4
Elizabeth Mitchell	Sheen (ENG); W 4 – 3	Gilbert (CAN); W 4 – 1	King (WAL); W 4 – 3	Plews (SCO); W 4 – 1	Kenyon (NIR); W 4 – 3	Sacco (SAF); L 2 – 4	O'Brien (AUS)		McCreath (AUS); L 1 – 4	Glen-Haig (ENG); L 2 – 4	Sacco (SAF); L 2 – 4	O'Brien (AUS); L 2 – 4	McElwee (NZL); L 1 – 4	Sheen (ENG); W 4 – 3	Maries (CAN); W 4 – 1	2	7

== Lawn bowls ==
Athlete	Event	Round robin														Rank
Athlete	Event	Opposition Score	Opposition Score	Opposition Score	Opposition Score	Opposition Score	Opposition Score	Opposition Score	Opposition Score	Opposition Score	Opposition Score	Opposition Score	W	D	L	Rank
James Pirret	Men's singles	Fulton (NIR); L 14 – 21	Danilowitz (SAF); W 21 – 13	Weir (KEN); L 9 – 21	Hall (JER); W 21 – 11	Jackson (SRH); L 15 – 21	Jones (SCO); L 3 – 21	Liddell (HKG); W 21 – 17	Williams (WAL); W 21 – 10	Linford (CAN); W 21 – 13	Bosisto (AUS); L 13 – 21	Baker (ENG); W 21 – 18	6	0	5	6
Ted Pilkington; John Morris	Men's pairs	Northern Ireland; W 25 – 11	South Africa; W 19 – 10	Kenya; W 24 – 17	Jersey; W 20 – 15	Southern Rhodesia; L 12 – 21	Scotland; W 19 – 17	Hong Kong; W 19 – 15	Wales; W 23 – 20	Canada; W 20 – 16	Australia; W 22 – 17	England; W 23 – 9	10	0	1	1st place, gold medalist(s)
Robin Andrew; Jeff Barron; Stanley Snedden; Bill Hampton	Men's fours	Northern Ireland; L 10 – 20	South Africa; L 15 – 23	Kenya; L 10 – 23	Jersey; L 23 – 28	Southern Rhodesia; L 13 – 19	Scotland; W 21 – 17	Hong Kong; L 13 – 23	Wales; L 19 – 24	Canada; W 24 – 15	Australia; W 27 – 9	England; L 14 – 16	3	0	8	10

== Rowing ==
Athlete	Event	Heat		Repechage		Final	
Athlete	Event	Time	Rank (Note: Ranks given are within the heat)	Time	Rank (Note: Ranks given are within the repechage)	Time	Rank
James Hill	Men's single scull	8:36.8	1 Q	—N/a		7:23.9	2nd place, silver medalist(s)
Norm Suckling; James Hill	Men's double scull	7:50.9	2	7:09.9	1 Q		3rd place, bronze medalist(s)
Bob Parker; Reg Douglas	Men's coxless pair	—N/a				7:11.1	1st place, gold medalist(s)
Donald Gemmell; Peter Aitchison; Frank Crotty; Graeme Moran; Richard Tuffin (cox)	Men's coxed four	7:51.7	3	7:04.2	2 Q		4

== Swimming ==
Athlete	Event	Heat		Final	
Athlete	Event	Result	Rank	Result	Rank
Philippa Gould	Women's 110 yards backstroke	1:13.8	3 Q	1:13.7	3rd place, bronze medalist(s)
Jennifer Hunter	Women's 110 yards freestyle	1:10.1	14	did not advance	
Colin McFadden					
Kay Sawyers	Women's 220 yards breaststroke	3:11.0	11	did not advance	
Tessa Staveley	Women's 110 yards butterfly	1:16.7	4 Q	1:14.4	2nd place, silver medalist(s)
Philippa Gould; Tessa Staveley; Kay Sawyers; Jennifer Hunter	Women's 4 × 110 yards medley relay	5:10.8	4 Q	5:06.4	4

== Weightlifting ==
Athlete	Event	Press	Snatch	Jerk	Total	Rank
Peter Ridgley	Lightweight	230 lb (104.3 kg)	195 lb (88.5 kg)	260 lb (117.9 kg)	685 lb (310.7 kg)	9
Hohepa Komene	Light heavyweight	240 lb (108.9 kg)	230 lb (104.3 kg)	300 lb (136.1 kg)	770 lb (349.3 kg)	10

== Wrestling ==
Athlete	Event	Elimination rounds				Rank
Athlete	Event	Opposition Result	Opposition Result	Opposition Result	Opposition Result	Rank
Brian Bognuda	Featherweight	Aspen (ENG); L	Geldenhuys (SAF); L	Eliminated		=6
Gordon Hobson	Welterweight	Boese (CAN); L	Scott (WAL); W	de Villiers (SAF); L	Eliminated	=5
Barrie Courtney	Middleweight	Rashid (PAK); L	van Zyl (SAF); L	Eliminated		=6
John da Silva	Heavyweight	Mitchell (AUS); L	Richmond (ENG); W	Nazir (PAK); L	Eliminated	5

== See also ==
- New Zealand Olympic Committee
- New Zealand at the Commonwealth Games
- New Zealand at the 1956 Summer Olympics
- New Zealand at the 1960 Summer Olympics
