= Lawn bowls at the 1958 British Empire and Commonwealth Games =

- Venue: Sophia Gardens and Guest Keen Sports Club
- Location: Cardiff, Wales
- Dates: 18–26 July 1958

Lawn bowls at the 1958 British Empire and Commonwealth Games was the sixth appearance of the Lawn bowls at the Commonwealth Games. Competition at the 1958 British Empire and Commonwealth Games took place in Cardiff, Wales, from 18 to 26 July 1958.

The event was held at two venues; at the Cardiff Bowls Club in Sophia Gardens and the Guest Keen Sports Club, which was located on the former site of White City Stadium, Cardiff.

South Africa topped the medal table by virtue of winning one gold medal and two silver medals.

== Medal table ==
* Host nation (Wales)

Medals won by nation, ranked and sortable, with totals
Rank	Nation	Gold	Silver	Bronze	Total
1	South Africa	1	2	0	3
2	England	1	1	0	2
3	New Zealand	1	0	0	1
4	Northern Rhodesia	0	0	1	1
4	Rhodesia and Nyasaland	0	0	1	1
4	Southern Rhodesia	0	0	1	1
7	Australia	0	0	0	0
7	Canada	0	0	0	0
7	Hong Kong	0	0	0	0
7	Jersey	0	0	0	0
7	Kenya	0	0	0	0
7	Northern Ireland	0	0	0	0
7	Scotland	0	0	0	0
7	Wales	0	0	0	0
Totals (14 entries)		3	3	3	9

== Medallists ==
Event	Gold	Silver	Bronze
Men's singles	(South Africa); Phineas 'Pinky' Danilowitz	(England); Percy Baker	(Federation of Rhodesia and Nyasaland); Bill Jackson
Men's pairs	(New Zealand); John Morris; Ted Pilkington	(South Africa); John Myrdal; Rudolph van Vuuren	(Southern Rhodesia); William Yuill; Hector Philp
Men's fours	(England); Norman King; John Bettles; Walter Phillips; John Scadgell	(South Africa); Wilfred Randall; Edward Stuart; Edward Williams; Norman Snowy Walker	(Northern Rhodesia); Alex Pascoe; Charles Bradley; Basil Wells; Ronnie Turner

== Results ==
=== Men's singles – round robin ===
Men's singles round robin results
Pos	Player	P	W	L	Pts
1	(South Africa) Phineas 'Pinky' Danilowitz	11	10	1	20
2	(England) Percy Baker	11	8	3	16+
3	(Federation of Rhodesia and Nyasaland) Bill Jackson	11	8	3	16
4	(Scotland) William Downes Jones	11	7	4	14
5	(Australia) Glyn Bosisto	11	7	4	14
6	(New Zealand) James ‘Ham’ Pirret	11	6	5	12
7	(Hong Kong) Eric Liddell	11	5	6	10
8	(Northern Ireland) Roy Fulton	11	4	7	8
9	(Wales) Bernie Williams	11	4	7	8
10	(Kenya) John Weir	11	3	8	6
11	(Canada) John Linford	11	3	8	6
12	(Jersey) Harry Hall	11	1	10	2

+ Silver medal play off
Baker beat Jackson 21-18

=== Men's pairs – round robin ===
Men's pairs, round robin results
Pos	Player	P	W	D	L	Pts
1	(New Zealand) John Morris & Ted Pilkington	11	10	0	1	20
2	(South Africa) John Myrdal & Rudolph van Vuuren	11	8	0	3	16+
3	(Southern Rhodesia) William Yuill & Hector Philp	11	8	0	3	16
4	(Australia) Ronald Marshall & Allan Rafton	11	7	0	4	14
5	(Northern Ireland) William Rosbotham & Percy Watson	11	7	0	4	14
6	(England) Fred Horn & Harold Shapland	11	6	0	5	12
7	(Canada) Sandy Houston & George Dewar	11	6	0	5	12
8	(Hong Kong) C C Ma & Robert Gourlay	11	5	0	6	10
9	(Wales) Wilf John & Jack Lewis	11	4	0	7	8
10	(Kenya) A Graham & W Careful	11	3	0	8	6
11	(Scotland) Jim Kerr & David Smart	11	1	0	10	2
12	(Jersey) Graham Bewhay & Billy McDowell	11	1	0	10	2

+ Silver medal play off
South Africa beat Southern Rhodesia 17-10

=== Men's fours – round robin ===
Men's fours, round robin results
Pos	Player	P	W	D	L	Pts
1	(England) Norman King, John Bettles, Walter Phillips, John Scadgell	11	9	0	2	18+
2	(South Africa) Wilfred Randall, Edward Stuart, Edward Williams, Norman Snowy Walker	11	9	0	2	18
3	(Northern Rhodesia) Alex Pascoe, Charles Bradley, Basil Wells, Ronnie Turner	11	8	0	3	16
4	(Australia) Richard Gillings, William Pope, Arthur Baldwin, George Makin	11	7	1	3	15
5	(Hong Kong) Augusto Pedro Pereira, Alfred Coates, Mohammed B Hassan Sr., Raoul da Luz	11	7	0	4	14
6	(Scotland) John Hampson, Thomas Smetherham, George Ferguson, Alexander Hodge	11	6	1	4	13
7	(Wales) Evan Jones, Danny Prosser, Jack Griffths, Len Hill	11	6	0	5	12
8	(Northern Ireland) George Best, Tom Henry, Jack Webb, Gerry Crossey	11	4	0	7	8
9	(Kenya) C Cochran, J Trowsdale, R Roberts, S Strachan	11	4	0	7	8
10	(New Zealand) Robin Andrew, Stanley Snedden, Jeff Barron, Bill Hampton	11	3	0	8	6
11	(Jersey) Tom Williams, Fred Tucker, Arthur Crossley, Cyril Cracknell	11	2	0	9	4
12	(Canada) Bert Gallagher, Stirling Shields, Harry Gardler, Harry Robertson	11	0	0	11	0

+ Gold medal play off
England beat South Africa 22-13

== See also ==
- List of Commonwealth Games medallists in lawn bowls
- Lawn bowls at the Commonwealth Games
