= Herbert Morton =

Scottish lawn bowler

Personal information
- Nationality: British (Scottish)
- Born: 1887 Newmilns, Scotland
- Died: 1961 (aged 73–74) Old Cumnock, Scotland

Sport
- Sport: Lawn bowls
- Club: Lugar Works Bowling and Social Club

Herbert William Morton (1887 – 1961), was a Scottish international lawn bowler.

== Biography ==
Morton lived at 109 Glaisnock Street in Cumnock and was a cinema director by trade. He ran the Cumnock Picture House.

By 1953 he owned two cinemas in Old Cumnock and Auchinleck and he was the director of the Ayrshire Bowling Association.

He was a member of the Lugar Works Bowling and Social Club. and represented the Scottish team at the 1954 British Empire and Commonwealth Games in Vancouver, Canada, where he participated in the fours event, with Finlay McIver, George Budge and John Carswell, finishing in tenth place.
