= Charles Bradley (bowls) =

South African–born lawn bowler

Charles Stewart Bradley
Personal information
- Nationality: South Africa (Federation of Rhodesia and Nyasaland) Rhodesia and Nyasaland
- Born: 1919 South Africa

Sport
- Club: Bulawayo BC
Medal record
Representing Southern Rhodesia
Commonwealth Games
| Bronze medal – third place | 1958 Cardiff | fours |
Representing Rhodesia and Nyasaland
Commonwealth Games
| Bronze medal – third place | 1962 Perth | pairs |

Charles Stewart Bradley (born 1919) is a South African-born former international lawn bowler who competed for Rhodesia.

== Bowls career ==
Bradley won a bronze medal at the 1958 British Empire and Commonwealth Games in Cardiff in the fours with Alex Pascoe, Basil Wells and Ronnie Turner. Four years later he won a second bronze in the pairs competition at the 1962 Commonwealth Games with Bill Jackson.

== Personal life ==
His son Alan Bradley was also Rhodesian international bowler. He was a farmer by trade.
