= Finlay McIver =

Scottish lawn bowler

Personal information
- Nationality: British (Scottish)
- Born: 1895 Inverness, Scotland
- Died: 31 March 1965 (aged 69–70) Inverness, Scotland

Sport
- Sport: Lawn bowls
- Club: Inverness Bowls Club

Finlay Duffus McIver also spelt MacIver (1895 – 31 March 1965), was a Scottish international lawn bowler who competed at the British Empire and Commonwealth Games (now Commonwealth Games).

== Biography ==
McIver attended the Inverness Royal Acdemy and lived at 42 Crown Drive in Inverness and was a member of the Inverness Bowls Club.

He represented the Scottish team at the 1954 British Empire and Commonwealth Games in Vancouver, Canada, where he participated in the fours event, with George Budge, Herbert Morton and John Carswell, finishing in tenth place.

McIver was the senior partner in the family furniture and undertaking business of MacIver and Company. He died in 1965 and a lawn bowls competition was named in his honour.
