= Alex Pascoe =

Rhodesian international lawn bowler

Personal information
- Nationality: Southern Rhodesia
Medal record
Representing Southern Rhodesia
Commonwealth Games
| Bronze medal – third place | 1954 Vancouver | fours |
| Bronze medal – third place | 1958 Cardiff | fours |

Alex Pascoe is a former Rhodesian international lawn bowler.

He won two bronze medals at the Commonwealth Games. He won his first of the two medals in the fours at the 1954 British Empire and Commonwealth Games in Vancouver with Alan Bradley, Fred Hockin and Ronnie Turner.

Four years later he another bronze in the fours with Basil Wells, Charles Bradley and Ronnie Turner at the 1958 Commonwealth Games.
