= Fred Hockin =

Rhodesian international lawn bowler

Personal information
- Nationality: Southern Rhodesia
Medal record
Representing Southern Rhodesia
Commonwealth Games
Bronze medal – third place	1954 Vancouver	fours

Fred D Hockin is a former Rhodesian international lawn bowler.

He won a bronze medal in the fours at the 1954 British Empire and Commonwealth Games in Vancouver with Alan Bradley, Alex Pascoe and Ronnie Turner.
