= Lawn bowls at the 1954 British Empire and Commonwealth Games =

- Venue: West Point Grey Lawn Bowling Club & New Westminster Bowling Club
- Location: Vancouver, Canada
- Dates: 30 July – 7 August 1954
- Competitors: 61 from 11 nations

Lawn bowls at the 1954 British Empire and Commonwealth Games was the fifth appearance of the Lawn bowls at the Commonwealth Games.

Competition at the 1954 British Empire and Commonwealth Games took place in Vancouver, British Columbia, Canada from 30 July until 7 August 1954.

The host clubs were the West Point Grey Lawn Bowling Club of Vancouver and the New Westminster Bowling Club of New Westminster.

The lawn bowlers from the British nations were the first athletes to be named for the Games because they were selected as part of a touring party of Canada.

South Africa, Southern Rhodesia and Northern Ireland won one gold medal each.

== Medal table ==
* Host nation (Canada)

| Rank | Nation | Gold | Silver | Bronze | Total |
|---|---|---|---|---|---|
| 1 | South Africa | 1 | 0 | 1 | 2 |
| 1 | Southern Rhodesia | 1 | 0 | 1 | 2 |
| 3 | Northern Ireland | 1 | 0 | 0 | 1 |
| 4 | Canada* | 0 | 1 | 0 | 1 |
| 4 | Hong Kong | 0 | 1 | 0 | 1 |
| 4 | New Zealand | 0 | 1 | 0 | 1 |
| 7 | Scotland | 0 | 0 | 1 | 1 |
| 8 | Australia | 0 | 0 | 0 | 0 |
| 8 | England | 0 | 0 | 0 | 0 |
| 8 | Northern Rhodesia | 0 | 0 | 0 | 0 |
| 8 | Wales | 0 | 0 | 0 | 0 |
| Totals (11 entries) | | 3 | 3 | 3 | 9 |

== Medallists ==
| Event | Gold | Silver | Bronze |
|---|---|---|---|
| Men's singles | (Southern Rhodesia); Ralph Hodges | (New Zealand); James Pirret Jr. | (South Africa); Arthur Saunders |
| Men's pairs | (Northern Ireland); William Rosbotham; Percy Watson | (Canada); Sam Gardiner; Dick Williams | (Scotland); George Budge; John Carswell |
| Men's Fours | (South Africa); Frank Mitchell; George Wilson; John Anderson; Wilfred Randall | (Hong Kong); Alfred Coates; Jose da Luz; Raoul da Luz; Robert Gourlay | (Southern Rhodesia); Alan Bradley; Alex Pascoe; Fred Hockin; Ronnie Turner |

== Results ==
=== Results ===
| Round | Tie 1 | Tie 2 | Tie 3 | Tie 4 | Tie 5 |
|---|---|---|---|---|---|
| Round 1 | Aus 11 SAf 21 | NRho bt Can | Hkg bt Eng | Nzl bt Wal | SRho bt Sco |
| Round 2 | Aus bt Eng | SRho bt Can | Nzl bt Hkg | NRho 21 SAf 12 | Wal bt Sco |
| Round 3 | Aus 21 Nzl 20 | Can 12 Sco 23 | Eng 18 SRho 21 | Hkg 15 NRho 21 | SAf 11 Wal 21 |
| Round 4 | Aus 21 Hkg 4 | Can 21 Wal 14 | Eng 15 NRho 21 | Nzl 21 Sco 7 | SAf 21 SRho 14 |
| Round 5 | Aus 21 Sco 12 | Can 21 Hkg 12 | Eng 18 SAf 21 | Nzl 17 SRho 21 | NRho 19 Wal 21 |
| Round 6 | Aus 20 SRho 21 | Can 20 SAf 21 | Eng 13 Sco 21 | Hkg 20 Wal 21 | Nzl 14 NRho 21 |
| Round 7 | Aus 19 Can 21 | Eng 8 Nzl 21 | Hkg 10 SAf 21 | NRho 16 Sco 21 | SRho 21 Wal 20 |
| Round 8 | Aus 21 NRho 18 | Can 8 Nzl 21 | Eng 20 Wal 21 | Hkg 15 SRho 21 | SAf 21 Sco 14 |
| Round 9 | Aus 11 Wal 21 | Can 21 Eng 7 | Hkg 21 Sco 11 | Nzl 21 SAf 8 | NRho 15 SRho 21 |

| Pos | Player | P | W | L | Pts |
|---|---|---|---|---|---|
| 1 | (Southern Rhodesia) Ralph Hodges | 9 | 8 | 1 | 16 |
| 2 | (New Zealand) James Pirret Jr. | 9 | 6 | 3 | 12 |
| 3 | (South Africa) Arthur Saunders | 9 | 6 | 3 | 12 |
| 4 | (Northern Rhodesia) Jack Fairburn | 9 | 5 | 4 | 10 |
| 5 | (Wales) Alfred Thomas | 9 | 5 | 4 | 10 |
| 6 | (Australia) Glyn Bosisto | 9 | 5 | 4 | 10 |
| 7 | (Canada) John Linford | 9 | 4 | 5 | 8 |
| 8 | (Scotland) Robert Laing | 9 | 3 | 6 | 6 |
| 9 | (Hong Kong) Jose da Luz | 9 | 2 | 7 | 4 |
| 10 | (England) Stanley Lee | 9 | 1 | 8 | 2 |

=== Results ===
| Round | Tie 1 | Tie 2 | Tie 3 | Tie 4 | Tie 5 |
|---|---|---|---|---|---|
| Round 1 | Aus 27 SAf 14 | Can 23 NRho 14 | Hkg by Eng | NIre 29 Nzl 12 | SRho bt Sco |
| Round 2 | Aus 21 Eng 20 | Can 17 SRho 15 | Nzl bt Hkg | NIre 20 Sco 12 | SAf bt NRho |
| Round 3 | Aus 21 Nzl 19 | Can 14 Sco 19 | Eng 19 SRho 29 | Hkg 16 NRho 18 | NIre 24 SAf 21 |
| Round 4 | Aus 17 Hkg 22 | Can 18 NIre 18 | Eng 21 NRho 16 | Nzl 20 Sco 21 | SAf 25 SRho 21 |
| Round 5 | Aus 12 Sco 27 | Can 13 Hkg 23 | Eng 14 SAf 29 | NIre 16 NRho 18 | Nzl 17 SRho 28 |
| Round 6 | Aus 28 S Rho 22 | Can 24 SAf 13 | Eng 13 Sco 22 | Hkg 16 NIre 26 | Nzl 21 NRho 18 |
| Round 7 | Aus 15 Can 24 | Eng 20 Nzl 21 | Hkg 19 SAf 23 | NIre 18 SRho 13 | NRho 16 Sco 20 |
| Round 8 | Aus 18 NRho 20 | Can 27 Nzl 13 | Eng 17 NIre 23 | Hkg 20 SRho 17 | SAf 19 Sco 20 |
| Round 9 | Aus 12 NIre 26 | Can 19 Eng 16 | Hkg 27 Sco 15 | Nzl 25 SAf 22 | NRho 26 SRho 12 |

| Pos | Player | P | W | D | L | Pts |
|---|---|---|---|---|---|---|
| 1 | (Northern Ireland) William Rosbotham & Percy Watson | 9 | 7 | 1 | 1 | 15 |
| 2 | (Canada) Sam Gardiner & Dick Williams | 9 | 6 | 1 | 2 | 13 |
| 3 | (Scotland) George Budge & John Carswell | 9 | 6 | 0 | 3 | 12 |
| 4 | (Hong Kong) Eric Liddell & Raoul da Luz | 9 | 5 | 0 | 4 | 10 |
| 5 | (South Africa) Harry Barker & William Stead | 9 | 4 | 0 | 5 | 8 |
| 6 | (Northern Rhodesia) James Rae & John Milligan | 9 | 4 | 0 | 5 | 8 |
| 7 | (Australia) John Bird & David Long | 9 | 4 | 0 | 5 | 8 |
| 8 | (New Zealand) Arthur Snaddon & Eliphalet ‘Lifey’ Ravenwood | 9 | 4 | 0 | 5 | 8 |
| 9 | (Southern Rhodesia) Alan Bradley & Ronnie Turner | 9 | 3 | 0 | 6 | 6 |
| 10 | (England) Edwin Bateman & Tom Stewart | 9 | 1 | 0 | 8 | 2 |

=== Results ===
| Round | Tie 1 | Tie 2 | Tie 3 | Tie 4 | Tie 5 |
|---|---|---|---|---|---|
| Round 1 | Aus 22 SAf 22 | Can 13 NRho 29 | Eng 20 Hkg 26 | Nzl 18 Wal 24 | Sco 10 SRho 35 |
| Round 2 | Aus 21 Eng 13 | Can 20 SRho 24 | Hkg 26 Nzl 20 | NRho 12 SAf 22 | Sco 18 Wal 14 |
| Round 3 | Aus 14 Nzl 30 | Can 28 Sco 13 | Eng 20 SRho 13 | Hkg 22 NRho 16 | SAf 23 Wal 10 |
| Round 4 | Aus 20 Hkg 26 | Can 25 Wal 20 | Eng 21 NRho 25 | Nzl 14 Sco 26 | SAf 21 SRho 14 |
| Round 5 | Aus 31 Sco 14 | Can 14 Hkg 20 | Eng 19 SAf 20 | Nzl 11 SRho 26 | NRho 22 Wal 10 |
| Round 6 | Aus 20 SRho 19 | Can 12 SAf 29 | Eng 23 Sco 6 | Hkg 20 Wal 19 | Nzl 26 NRho 20 |
| Round 7 | Aus 25 Can 16 | Eng 20 Nzl 20 | Hkg 18 SAf 21 | NRho 20 Sco 11 | SRho 38 Wal 12 |
| Round 8 | Aus 21 NRho 21 | Can 18 Nzl 29 | Eng 12 Wal 19 | Hkg 17 SRho 24 | Sco 18 SAf 21 |
| Round 9 | Aus 19 Wal 19 | Can 18 Eng 17 | Hkg 34 Sco 11 | Nzl 14 SAf 26 | NRho 16 SRho 20 |

| Pos | Player | P | W | D | L | Pts |
|---|---|---|---|---|---|---|
| 1 | (South Africa) Frank Mitchell, George Wilson, John Anderson, Wilfred Randall | 9 | 8 | 1 | 0 | 17 |
| 2 | (Hong Kong) Alfred Coates, Jose da Luz, Raoul da Luz, Robert Gourlay | 9 | 7 | 0 | 2 | 14 |
| 3 | (Southern Rhodesia) Alan Bradley, Alex Pascoe, Fred Hockin, Ronnie Turner | 9 | 6 | 0 | 3 | 12 |
| 4 | (Australia) Charles Beck, Elgar Collins, Neville Green, Walter Maling | 9 | 4 | 3 | 2 | 11 |
| 5 | (Northern Rhodesia) James Rae, John Milligan, Samuel Goatley, William Hynd | 9 | 4 | 1 | 4 | 9 |
| 6 | (New Zealand) Arthur Webster, Arthur Connew, Pete Skoglund, William Freeth | 9 | 3 | 1 | 5 | 7 |
| 7 | (Canada) Edward Brown, George Mackintosh, Harold Jenkins, Billy Calder | 9 | 3 | 0 | 6 | 6 |
| 8 | (England) James Carr, John Coles, Stanley Lee, William Parker | 9 | 2 | 1 | 6 | 5 |
| 9 | (Wales) Alfred Thomas, Ivor Thomas, Obadiah Hopkins, Robert Devonald | 9 | 2 | 1 | 6 | 5 |
| 10 | (Scotland) Finlay McIver, George Budge, Herbert Morton, John Carswell | 9 | 2 | 0 | 7 | 4 |

== See also ==
- List of Commonwealth Games medallists in lawn bowls
- Lawn bowls at the Commonwealth Games
