= Robin Andrew =

Robin Andrew may refer to:

- Robin Andrew (footballer) (born 1945), Australian footballer
- Robin Andrew (bowls) (1912–1985), New Zealand lawn bowls player
