= Alan Bradley =

Alan, Allan or Allen Bradley may refer to:

== People ==
- Alan Bradley (bowls) (born 1926), Rhodesian international lawn bowler
- Alan Bradley (writer) (1938–2026), Canadian mystery writer
- Allan Bradley, British geneticist

== Fictional ==
- Alan Bradley (Coronation Street), a fictional character in the soap opera
- Alan Bradley, a character in the Tron films

== Companies ==
- Allen-Bradley, a brand name of equipment manufactured by Rockwell Automation
