= Lawn bowls at the 1962 British Empire and Commonwealth Games =

- Venue: Dalkeith Nedlands Bowling Club
- Location: Perth, Australia
- Dates: 19 November – 1 December 1962

Lawn bowls at the 1962 British Empire and Commonwealth Games was the seventh appearance of the Lawn bowls at the Commonwealth Games. Competition at the 1962 British Empire and Commonwealth Games took place in Perth, Western Australia, from 19 November until 1 December 1962. The bowls competition started several days before the official opening of the Commonwealth Games.

The competition took place at the Dalkeith Nedlands Bowling Club on the 'Paratai Drive' (Jutland Parade).

England topped the medal table by winning two gold medals.

== Medal table ==
* Host nation (Australia)

Medals won by nation, ranked and sortable
| Rank | Nation | Gold | Silver | Bronze | Total |
|---|---|---|---|---|---|
| 1 | England | 2 | 0 | 0 | 2 |
| 2 | New Zealand | 1 | 0 | 0 | 1 |
| 3 | Scotland | 0 | 3 | 0 | 3 |
| 4 | Rhodesia and Nyasaland | 0 | 0 | 3 | 3 |
| Totals (4 entries) | | 3 | 3 | 3 | 9 |

== Medallists ==
Medallists by event
| Event | Gold | Silver | Bronze |
|---|---|---|---|
| Men's singles | (England); David Bryant | (Scotland); Joseph Black | (Federation of Rhodesia and Nyasaland); Alan Bradley |
| Men's pairs | (New Zealand); Robbie Robson; Bob McDonald | (Scotland); Thomas Hamill; Michael Purdon | (Federation of Rhodesia and Nyasaland); Charles Bradley; Bill Jackson |
| Men's fours | (England); David Bryant; Les Watson; Sidney Drysdale; Tom Fleming | (Scotland); Michael Purdon; Thomas Hamill; Joseph Black; William Moore | (Federation of Rhodesia and Nyasaland); John Milligan; Malcolm Bibb; Ronnie Turner; Victor Blyth |

== Results ==
=== Men's singles – round robin ===
Men's singles round robin results
| Pos | Player | P | W | L | F | A | Pts |
|---|---|---|---|---|---|---|---|
| 1 | (England) David Bryant | 12 | 12 | 0 | 259 | 153 | 24 |
| 2 | (Scotland) Joseph Black | 12 | 10 | 2 | 240 | 158 | 20+ |
| 3 | (Federation of Rhodesia and Nyasaland) Alan Bradley | 12 | 10 | 2 | 232 | 147 | 20 |
| 4 | (Australia) Leigh Fitzpatrick | 12 | 9 | 3 | 216 | 187 | 18 |
| 5 | (Hong Kong) F. R. Kermani | 12 | 7 | 4 | 236 | 175 | 14 |
| 6 | (New Zealand) Jeff Barron | 12 | 6 | 6 | 231 | 186 | 12 |
| 7 | (Fiji) B A Henry | 12 | 6 | 6 | 195 | 227 | 12 |
| 8 | (Northern Ireland) Percy Watson | 12 | 5 | 7 | 208 | 218 | 10 |
| 9 | (Canada) Stirling Shields | 12 | 4 | 8 | 193 | 226 | 8 |
| 10 | (Wales) Albert Evans | 12 | 4 | 8 | 211 | 216 | 8 |
| 11 | (Jersey) Bill Askew | 12 | 3 | 9 | 159 | 242 | 6 |
| 12 | (Kenya) Jimmy Noon | 12 | 1 | 11 | 142 | 248 | 2 |
| 13 | (Territory of Papua and New Guinea) G Page | 12 | 1 | 11 | 106 | 245 | 2 |

+Silver play off
Black beat Bradley 21-14

=== Men's pairs – round robin ===
Men's pairs round robin results
| Pos | Player | P | W | D | L | F | A | Pts |
|---|---|---|---|---|---|---|---|---|
| 1 | (New Zealand) Robbie Robson & Bob McDonald | 10 | 9 | 0 | 1 | 265 | 143 | 18 |
| 2 | (Scotland) Thomas Hamill & Michael Purdon | 10 | 8 | 0 | 2 | 241 | 160 | 16 |
| 3 | (Federation of Rhodesia and Nyasaland) Charles Bradley & Bill Jackson | 10 | 7 | 0 | 3 | 211 | 181 | 14+ |
| 4 | (England) Les Watson & Tom Fleming | 10 | 7 | 0 | 3 | 195 | 189 | 14 |
| 5 | (Australia) Robert Kelly & Willis Teague | 10 | 6 | 0 | 4 | 196 | 157 | 12 |
| 6 | (Hong Kong) C C Ma & P Gardner | 10 | 5 | 0 | 5 | 211 | 184 | 10 |
| 7 | (Fiji) H Robinson & W Holborrow | 10 | 4 | 0 | 6 | 193 | 193 | 8 |
| 8 | (Wales) Lynn Probert & Tom Griffiths | 10 | 3 | 1 | 6 | 167 | 202 | 7 |
| 9 | (Kenya) George Ashford & Bill Coackley | 10 | 3 | 0 | 7 | 164 | 221 | 6 |
| 10 | (Canada) Aiia Hoar & Ross Moir | 10 | 2 | 1 | 7 | 169 | 220 | 5 |
| 11 | (Territory of Papua and New Guinea) A Barnes & Wally Jackson | 10 | 0 | 0 | 10 | 105 | 267 | 0 |

+ Bronze medal play off
Rhodesia & Nyasaland beat England 23-14

=== Men's rinks (fours) – round robin ===
Men's fours round robin results
| Pos | Player | P | W | D | L | F | A | Pts |
|---|---|---|---|---|---|---|---|---|
| 1 | (England) David Bryant, Les Watson, Sidney Drysdale, Tom Fleming | 10 | 8 | 0 | 2 | 239 | 125 | 16 |
| 2 | (Scotland) Michael Purdon, Thomas Hamill, Joseph Black, William Moore | 10 | 7 | 0 | 3 | 216 | 158 | 14+ |
| 3 | (Federation of Rhodesia and Nyasaland) John Milligan, Malcolm Bibb, Ronnie Turner, Victor Blyth | 10 | 7 | 0 | 3 | 229 | 156 | 14 |
| 4 | (Australia) Arthur Baldwin, George Makin, Leslie Edgeworth, Richard Gillings | 10 | 6 | 1 | 3 | 219 | 186 | 13 |
| 5 | (Wales) Claude Stephens, Lynn Probert, Tom Griffiths, Albert Evans | 10 | 6 | 1 | 3 | 178 | 168 | 13 |
| 6 | (New Zealand) John Rabone, Malcolm Boon, Ted Pilkington, Bill O'Neill | 10 | 6 | 0 | 4 | 230 | 157 | 12 |
| 7 | (Hong Kong) Augusto Pedro Pereira, Eric Liddell, F. R. Kermani, George Souza Sr. | 10 | 4 | 0 | 6 | 203 | 214 | 8 |
| 8 | (Kenya) Ted Wiltshire, George Ashford, Malvin Katzler, Bill Coackley | 10 | 4 | 0 | 6 | 160 | 226 | 8 |
| 9 | (Fiji) G Williams, J Daunt, Max Bay, V Costello | 10 | 3 | 0 | 7 | 177 | 243 | 6 |
| 10 | (Canada) Aiia Hoar, Stirling Shields, Edward Brown, Ross Moir | 10 | 2 | 0 | 8 | 154 | 249 | 4 |
| 11 | Territory of Papua and New Guinea | 10 | 1 | 0 | 9 | 137 | 160 | 2 |

+ Silver play off
Scotland beat Rhodesia & Nyasaland 20-19

== See also ==
- List of Commonwealth Games medallists in lawn bowls
- Lawn bowls at the Commonwealth Games
