= William Parker (bowls) =

British lawn bowler (1892–1979)

Personal information
- Nationality: British (English)
- Born: September 27, 1892 London, England
- Died: 1979 London, England
- Occupation: Company Director

Sport
- Sport: Lawn bowls

William Charles Parker (1892–1979), was an English bowls player who competed at the Commonwealth Games.

== Bowls career ==
He participated in the 1954 British Empire and Commonwealth Games at Vancouver, British Columbia, Canada in the rinks/fours event with James Carr, John Coles and Stanley Lee, finishing 8th.

== Personal life ==
He was a Company Director for a scrap metal works and steel merchants by trade and lived at 11 Beaulieu Gardens, W21, London.
