= Graeme Moran =

New Zealand rower

Personal information
- Born: Graeme Maurice Moran; 12 October 1938 Wanganui, New Zealand
- Died: 24 February 1996 (aged 57) Wanganui, New Zealand
- Spouse: Susan Elizabeth Brown

Sport
- Sport: Rowing
- Club: Union Boat Club, Wanganui

Graeme Maurice Moran (12 October 1938 – 24 February 1996) was a New Zealand rower.

== Early life and family ==
Born in Wanganui on 12 October 1938, Moran was the son of Maurice Gerald Moran and Mona Moran (née Brougham). He married Susan Elizabeth Brown, and the couple went on to have three children.

== Rowing ==
A long-time member of the Union Boat Club in Wanganui, Moran was in the winning Union coxed four with Donald Gemmell, Peter Aitchison, Frank Crotty and Richard Tuffin (coxswain) at the New Zealand championships in 1958. The same crew went on to represent New Zealand at the 1958 British Empire and Commonwealth Games in Cardiff, finishing fourth.

Moran went on to win a further three national rowing titles, in the eights in 1959, 1960, and 1961. He was also a member of the Wanganui eight that won the Hallyburton Johnstone Cup at the 1958 inter-provincial championships.

== Death and legacy ==
Moran died on 24 February 1996, while training on the Whanganui River. The Graeme Moran Memorial Trophy, inaugurated in 1997, is a team trophy contested at inter-provincial rowing championships.
