= John Anderson (bowls) =

South African lawn bowler (1912 – after 1954)

Personal information
- Nationality: South Africa
- Born: 1912 United Kingdom
- Died: unknown

Sport
- Sport: lawn bowls
- Club: Durban BC
Medal record
Representing (South Africa)
Commonwealth Games
Gold medal – first place	1954 Vancouver	fours

John William Hamilton Anderson (1912 – after 1954) was a British born, South African international lawn bowler.

== Bowls career ==
Anderson won a gold medal in the fours at the 1954 British Empire and Commonwealth Games in Vancouver, with Frank Mitchell, Wilfred Randall and George Wilson.

Anderson won the 1949 rinks at the National Championships, bowling for the Durban Bowls Club.

== Personal life ==
Anderson was a company director by trade.
