= Edwin Bateman =

British lawn bowler (1880–1963)

Personal information
- Nationality: British (English)
- Born: October 17, 1880 Granby, Nottinghamshire
- Died: Q3, 1963 Nottingham
- Occupations: Master Dairyman & Company Director

Sport
- Sport: Lawn bowls

Edwin Bateman (1880-1963) was an English bowls player who competed at the Commonwealth Games.

== Bowls career ==
He participated in the 1954 British Empire and Commonwealth Games at Vancouver, British Columbia, Canada in the pairs event with Tom Stewart and finished 10th.

== Personal life ==
He was a Master Dairyman and company director by trade and lived in Granby and Repton Road in West Bridgeforth, Nottinghamshire.
