= Victor Blyth =

Rhodesian international lawn bowler

Personal information
- Nationality: Rhodesia and Nyasaland
Medal record
Representing Rhodesia and Nyasaland
Commonwealth Games
Bronze medal – third place	1962 Perth	fours

Victor Blyth, was a Rhodesia and Nyasaland international lawn bowler.

== Bowls career ==
He won a bronze medal in the fours at the 1962 British Empire and Commonwealth Games in Perth with Malcolm Bibb, John Milligan and Ronnie Turner.
