= John Coles (bowls) =

British lawn bowler (1892–1972)

John Lord Coles
Personal information
- Nationality: British (English)
- Born: July 28, 1892 Barnsley, England
- Died: 1972 Hillingdon, England
- Occupation: Company Director

Sport
- Sport: Lawn bowls

John Lord Coles (1892-1972), was an English bowls player who competed at the Commonwealth Games.

== Bowls career ==
He participated in the 1954 British Empire and Commonwealth Games at Vancouver, British Columbia, Canada in the fours/rinks event with James Carr, William Parker and Stanley Lee, finishing 8th.

== Personal life ==
He was a company director by trade and lived at Roughwood, on Harefield Place in Harefield, Uxbridge.
