= George Wilson (bowls) =

Personal information
- Nationality: South Africa
- Born: 1903
Medal record
Representing (South Africa)
Commonwealth Games
Gold medal – first place	1954 Vancouver	fours

George L Wilson (1903 - date of death unknown), was a South African international lawn bowler.

== Bowls career ==
He won a gold medal in the fours at the 1954 British Empire and Commonwealth Games in Vancouver, with Frank Mitchell, Wilfred Randall and John Anderson.

== Personal life ==
He was an engineer by trade.
