= Basil Wells (bowls) =

Rhodesian international lawn bowler

Personal information
- Nationality: Southern Rhodesia
Medal record
Representing Southern Rhodesia
Commonwealth Games
Bronze medal – third place	1958 Cardiff	fours

Basil Wells is a former Rhodesian international lawn bowler.

He won a bronze medal in the fours with Alex Pascoe, Charles Bradley and Ronnie Turner at the 1958 Commonwealth Games.
