= Robert Laing =

Robert Laing may refer to:

- Robert W. Laing, British production designer, art director and set decorator
- Robert Laing (bowls) (1888–1966), Scottish lawn bowler
- Robert Laing (badminton) (born 1999), Scottish para badminton player
