= Frank Mitchell (bowls) =

Personal information
- Nationality: South Africa
- Born: 1911

Sport
- Sport: lawn bowls
- Club: Pretoria BC
Medal record
Representing (South Africa)
Commonwealth Games
Gold medal – first place	1954 Vancouver	fours

Frank N Mitchell (1911 – date of death unknown), was a South African international lawn bowler.

== Bowls career ==
He won a gold medal in the fours at the 1954 British Empire and Commonwealth Games in Vancouver, with Wilfred Randall, George Wilson and John Anderson.

He won the 1950, 1952 and 1958 rinks at the National Championships, bowling for the Pretoria Bowls Club.

== Personal life ==
He was a civil servant by trade.
