= Peter Aitchison =

Peter Aitchison may refer to:

- Peter Aitchison (footballer) (1931–2022), English footballer
- Peter Aitchison (rower), New Zealand rower and manufacturer of farming equipment
