= Frank Crotty =

New Zealand rower and industrial chemist

Personal information
- Born: Francis Patrick Crotty; 11 April 1938 Foxton, New Zealand
- Died: 18 December 2016 (aged 78) Taradale, New Zealand
- Spouse: Julia Monro (m. 1963)

Sport
- Sport: Rowing
- Club: Union Boat Club, Whanganui

Francis Patrick Crotty (11 April 1938 – 18 December 2016) was a New Zealand rower and industrial chemist.

== Early life ==
Born in Foxton on 11 April 1938, Crotty was the son of Thomas Vincent Crotty and Lucy Pearl Crotty (née Thompson). In 1956, he began studying at Victoria University College, graduating with a Bachelor of Science degree in 1961.

== Rowing ==
A member of the Union Boat Club in Whanganui, Crotty was in the winning Union four with Donald Gemmell, Dave Martin and Allan Tong at the New Zealand championships in 1957. The following year he again won the national fours title, this time with Gemmell, Peter Aitchison, Graeme Moran and Richard Tuffin (coxswain), and the same crew went on to represent New Zealand at the 1958 British Empire and Commonwealth Games in Cardiff, finishing fourth.

== Career ==
Crotty worked for the Southland Frozen Meat Company in Invercargill and completed a Master of Science degree studying extramurally. In the late 1960s, Crotty and his family moved to Hawke's Bay where he was employed at the East Coast Fertiliser Works as production supervisor and chief chemist. In 1977, he took up the position of works manager at the New Zealand Farmers’ Fertiliser Company in New Plymouth, and in 1984 he was appointed general manager of Moa-Nui Cooperative Dairies in Inglewood.

Crotty joined Rotary in New Plymouth, serving as president of the New Plymouth North Rotary Club and district governor's representative in 1981–82. He continued his involvement with Rotary after moving to Hawke's Bay in 1992 as a member of the Taradale club. In 2010, Crotty was awarded the Paul Harris Fellowship.

== Family life ==
In 1963, Crotty married Julia Monro, and the couple went on to have five children. Crotty and his wife returned to Hawke's Bay in 1992, where they bought and ran a vineyard that they ran until retiring in 1999.

== Death ==
Crotty died at his home in Taradale on 18 December 2016.
