= Richard Tuffin =

New Zealand rowing coxswain

Personal information
- Born: Richard John Tuffin; 1944 (age 81–82) Whanganui, New Zealand

Sport
- Sport: Rowing
- Club: Union Boat Club, Whanganui

Richard John Tuffin (born 1944) is a former New Zealand rowing coxswain. He coxed the Union Boat Club four, consisting of Donald Gemmell, Peter Aitchison, Frank Crotty and Graeme Moran to victory at the New Zealand Rowing Championships in 1958. The same crew went on to represent New Zealand at the 1958 British Empire and Commonwealth Games in Cardiff, finishing fourth.

Born in Whanganui in 1944, Tuffin was 14 years old when he competed at the 1958 Cardiff games, and is the youngest person to represent New Zealand at a Commonwealth Games. New Zealand swimmer Rebecca Perrott was 12½ years old when she competed at the 1974 British Commonwealth Games, but she was representing Fiji where her father was registrar at the University of the South Pacific for six years.
