= Sydney Drysdale =

International lawn bowls competitor

Sidney Drysdale
Personal information
- Nationality: British (English)
- Born: 29 March 1904 Heaton, Newcastle upon Tyne, England
- Died: 26 February 1969 (aged 64)

Sport
- Sport: bowls
- Club: Whitley Bay
Medal record
Representing England
British Empire & Commonwealth Games
Gold medal – first place	1962 Perth	Men's Rinks (Fours)

Sidney Drysdale (1904 - 1969) was an international lawn bowls competitor for England.

In 1962 he captained the winning English team in the fours competition at the British Empire and Commonwealth Games, in Perth, Western Australia.

On his return to his home town, he was awarded the Whitley Bay Town Cup and Freedom of the Borough

== Biography ==
Drysdale was born in Heaton, Newcastle upon Tyne. His family had been Blacksmiths for generations at Bowsden in the north of Northumberland, but Drysdale's father, John, moved to Heaton in the eighteen nineties to start his own Blacksmith's business.

Drysdale was educated at Newcastle Royal Grammar School 1915–1920 and, after working on the quayside in Newcastle upon Tyne for a shipping firm, started his own haulage contracting firm in 1933 when he moved to live in Whitley Bay.

== Bowls career ==
After a promising football career, brought to a halt by injury, Drysdale had started to play lawn bowls at the Whitley & Monkseaton Bowling Club and won many local competitions leading him to be selected to play for Northumberland. In 1953 he was successful in winning through to the last 64 of the English national singles competition who then played at Paddington in London to determine the overall winner. Sid reached the semi-final before losing to international Algy Allen after a close and exciting match watched by a very large crowd.

As a result, in 1954 he was selected to play for England as a skip. After skipping his rink of four to ten international matches he remained an English international until 1965. The highlight of his time as an English international player was winning England's first gold medal, as skip of their lawn bowls four/rinks with David Bryant, Tom Fleming and Les Watson, at the British Empire and Commonwealth Games in 1962, held in Perth, Western Australia. For this achievement Drysdale was awarded the Whitley Bay Town Cup and given the Freedom of the Borough.

== Retirement ==
After his international appearances came to an end in 1965 Drysdale continued to play bowls for his county and club in Whitley Bay until he died suddenly on 26 February 1969. His death was reported nationally and internationally by the press and hundreds attended his funeral in Whitley Bay in support of his widow Emily, two sons (Alderman Peter Drysdale and Mr. Ian Drysdale) and other family members.

== Match of the Day ==
Drysdale remains the only lawn bowler to have ever been featured on football's Match of the Day programme. This occurred on Saturday 24 November 1962 when, during the programme, Kenneth Wolstenholme congratulated him on winning England's first Gold Medal and showed a film clip of him following one of his bowls down the rink to the applause of the crowd at the bowling green in Perth, Western Australia. He went on to mention that Sid had been nicknamed "the crab" by the spectators and TV audience in Australia because of the unusual way he ran down the green behind his bowls. This was mentioned again while Sid was present at the BBC's Sports Personality of the Year event in December 1962.
