= Cyril Snedden =

New Zealand cricketer

Personal information
- Full name: Cyril Alexander Snedden
- Born: 7 September 1893; Auckland, New Zealand
- Died: 16 January 1985 (aged 91); Auckland, New Zealand
- Relatives: Owen Snedden (brother); Nessie Snedden (brother); Colin Snedden (nephew); Warwick Snedden (nephew); Stanley Snedden (cousin); Martin Snedden (great-nephew)
- Source: ESPNcricinfo, 21 June 2016

Cyril Snedden (7 September 1893 – 16 January 1985) was a New Zealand cricketer. He played four first-class matches for Auckland in 1920/21.

Snedden, a solicitor in Auckland, also served as president of the New Zealand Rugby League.

== See also ==
- List of Auckland representative cricketers
