= Hector Philp =

Rhodesian international lawn bowler

Personal information
- Nationality: Southern Rhodesia
Medal record
Representing Southern Rhodesia
Commonwealth Games
Bronze medal – third place	1958 Cardiff	pairs

Hector Philp is a former Rhodesian international lawn bowler.

Philp won a bronze medal in the pairs at the 1958 Commonwealth Games with William Yuill.
