= Arthur Saunders (bowls) =

South African lawn bowler (1913–?)

Personal information
- Nationality: South Africa
- Born: 1913

Sport
- Sport: lawn bowls
- Club: East London Railway BC
Medal record
Representing (South Africa)
Commonwealth Games
Bronze medal – third place	1954 Vancouver	singles

Arthur W. Saunders (1913 – date of death unknown), was a South African international lawn bowler.

== Bowls career ==
Saunders won a bronze medal in the singles at the 1954 British Empire and Commonwealth Games in Vancouver.

He won the 1953 singles at the National Championships bowling for the East London Railway Bowls Club.

== Personal life ==
He was a company manager by trade.
