= Edward Williams (bowls) =

South African international lawn bowler (born 1911)

Personal information
- Nationality: South Africa
- Born: 29 January 1911
Medal record
Representing (South Africa)
Commonwealth Games
Silver medal – second place	1958 Cardiff	fours

Edward A. Williams (born 29 January 1911, date of death unknown) was a South African international lawn bowler.

== Bowls career ==
Williams won a silver medal in the fours at the 1958 British Empire and Commonwealth Games in Cardiff, with Norman Snowy Walker, Wilfred Randall and Edward Stuart.

== Personal life ==
Williams was a sales representative by trade.
