= Ralph Hodges (bowls) =

Rhodesian international lawn bowler

Personal information
- Nationality: Southern Rhodesia
Medal record
Representing Southern Rhodesia
Commonwealth Games
Gold medal – first place	1954 Vancouver	singles

Ralph F Hodges is a former Rhodesian international lawn bowler.

He won a gold medal in the singles at the 1954 British Empire and Commonwealth Games in Vancouver.
