= Dick Williams (bowls) =

Personal information
- Nationality: Canada
- Born: 1898 Wales

Sport
- Club: North Vancouver BC
Medal record
Representing Canada
Commonwealth Games
| Silver medal – second place | 1954 Vancouver | pairs |

Richard L Williams was a Welsh born Canadian international lawn bowler.

== Bowls career ==
He won a silver medal in the pairs at the 1954 British Empire and Commonwealth Games in Vancouver with Sam Gardiner and was the President of the North Vancouver Lawn Bowling Club.

== Awards ==
Both he and Sam Gardiner were inducted into the North Shore Sports Hall of Fame in 1968.

== Personal life ==
He emigrated to Canada at the age of 15.
