= Tom Fleming (bowls) =

English lawn bowler

Personal information
- Nationality: British (English)
- Born: 22 September 1910 Sedgefield, England
- Died: July 1977 (aged 66)

Sport
- Club: Albert Park BC, Middlesbrough
Medal record
Representing England
British Empire & Commonwealth Games
Gold medal – first place	1962 Perth	Men's Rinks (Fours)

George Thomas Fleming (born 1910, Sedgefield, died 1977) was an English international lawn bowler.

== Bowls career ==
He won a gold medal in the Men's Rinks (Fours) at the 1962 British Empire and Commonwealth Games in Perth, with Sidney Drysdale, David Bryant and Les Watson.

He won twice the runner-up in the 1959 and 1960 singles National Championship representing Albert Park Middlesbrough and Yorkshire.
