= Les Watson =

British lawn bowler

Personal information
- Nationality: British (English)
- Born: 3 May 1909 Darlington, England
- Died: 1 April 1991 (aged 82) Darlington, England

Sport
- Club: Darlington East Park
Medal record
Representing England
British Empire & Commonwealth Games
Gold medal – first place	1962 Perth	Men's Rinks (Fours)

John Leslie Watson (1909-1991), was an England international lawn bowler.

== Bowls career ==
He won a gold medal in the Men's Rinks (Fours) at the 1962 British Empire and Commonwealth Games in Perth, with Sidney Drysdale, David Bryant and Tom Fleming.

He won the 1956 National pairs championship with his brother Harry Watson representing Darlington East Park and Durham.

== Personal life ==
He was an engineer by trade.
