= Starstruck (2021 TV series) =

BBC comedy series

- Genre: Comedy
- Created by: Rose Matafeo
- Written by: Rose Matafeo; Alice Snedden
- Starring: Rose Matafeo; Nikesh Patel; Emma Sidi; Al Roberts
- Country of origin: United Kingdom
- Original language: English
- No. of series: 3
- No. of episodes: 18

Production
- Executive producers: Jon Thoday; Richard Allen-Turner; Rob Aslett; Toby Welch
- Producer: Claire McCarthy
- Running time: 21 minutes
- Production company: Avalon Television

Original release
- Network: BBC Three
- Release: 25 April 2021 – 28 August 2023

Starstruck is a romantic comedy television series created by Rose Matafeo, co-written with Alice Snedden, directed by Karen Maine, and starring Matafeo and Nikesh Patel with Minnie Driver in a special guest starring role. A second series was commissioned before the first series aired. Series one premiered 25 April 2021 and series two was released on 2 February 2022. In June 2022, the series was renewed for a third and final season, which was released on 28 August 2023. The series received positive critical reception.

== Premise ==
A screwball comedy about Jessie, a 20-something New Zealand woman living in Hackney, London, working jobs in a cinema and as a nanny. After a one-night stand on New Year's Eve, she discovers she slept with famous movie star Tom Kapoor. The series explores Jessie and Tom's relationship over the years as they break up, reunite and attempt to see other people. Despite attempting to move on from each other and wanting different things, the two are repeatedly drawn back to each other.

== Cast ==
=== Main ===
- Rose Matafeo as Jessie, a New Zealander living and working in London who has a one-night stand with a stranger who turns out to be a famous actor. Jessie initially decides to leave London to go back to New Zealand after feeling stuck but Tom later convinces her to stay.
- Nikesh Patel as Tom Kapoor, an A-list actor and Jessie's love interest. Tom is known to have only ever had three girlfriends before meeting Jessie, the last of which ended when his ex dumped him (despite Jessie's assumption that they are still together).
- Emma Sidi as Kate, Jessie's best friend and flatmate in the first two series. She is a big supporter of Jessie and Tom's relationship and often tries to force them into situations where they have to interact with one another.
- Al Roberts as Ian: Kate's boyfriend; Kate and Jessie meet Ian at a club on New Year's Eve.

=== Recurring ===
- Joe Barnes as Joe: Jessie's manager and friend at the cinema. It is known that the two have previously slept together causing Joe to harbour unrequited feelings for Jessie
- Nic Sampson as Steve: Jessie's friend and Sarah's boyfriend (later husband)
- Lola-Rose Maxwell as Sarah: Jessie and Kate's irritable friend and Steve's girlfriend (later wife)
- Minnie Driver as Cath: Tom's agent who does not approve of his relationship with Jessie
- Jon Pointing as Dan (series 1, 3): Jessie's non-committal friend-with-benefits, whom Kate dislikes
- Abraham Popoola as Jacob (series 1, 3): A friend of Jessie and Kate, introduced at the Murder Mystery evening
- Sindhu Vee as Sindhu (series 1): Jessie's employer in the first series, who has employed both her and Shivani to look after her two children
- Ambreen Razia as Shivani (series 1, 3): A friend of Jessie's, who also looks after Sindhu's children
- Alice Snedden as Amelia (series 1, 3): A friend of Jessie and Kate, introduced at the Murder Mystery evening
- Edward Easton as Ben (series 2): Jessie's ex-boyfriend, who comes back into her life in the second series after receiving a letter she sent when she had originally planned to leave London
- Nadia Parkes as Sophie Diller (series 1): Tom's co-star in the film Siege on Olympus
- Parth Thakerar as Vinay Kapoor (series 2): Tom's brother, a clinical paediatrician
- Russell Tovey as Dave (series 2): director of a film Tom is starring
- Constance Labbé as Clem (series 3): Tom's fiancée in the third series
- Lorne MacFadyen as Liam (series 3): Jessie's love interest in the third series, introduced at Kate and Ian's wedding as the latter's electrician
- Liz Kingsman as Liz (series 1)

== Episodes ==
Series	Episodes	Originally released
1	6	25 April 2021
2	6	7 February 2022
3	6	28 August 2023

=== Series 1 (2021) ===
No.	Title	Directed by	Written by	Original release date	U.K. viewers (millions)
1	"NYE"	Karen Maine	Rose Matafeo and Alice Snedden	25 April 2021	N/A
On New Year's Eve 2020, Jessie (Rose Matafeo) reluctantly agrees to go to a club with her best friend/flatmate Kate (Emma Sidi). There, Jessie and Kate talk to Ian (Al Roberts), who claims to be only romantically interested in Kate. Jessie eventually sneaks into the men's toilets and accidentally meets Tom (Nikesh Patel). They see each other later at the bar while waiting for drinks and talk. This leads to Jessie going home with him. Jessie wakes up the next day and realises that Tom is a famous actor. After leaving Tom's place, Jessie goes to babysit and then later returns to her apartment, where she finds Kate and mentions what happened the night before. Jessie then goes to her other job in a cinema. While walking back home from her shift, she spots Tom on the street. They talk and Jessie ends up staying the night again at Tom's apartment. The next morning, Jessie finds something in there that unsettles her and makes her question Tom's relationship availability, prompting Jessie to leave without saying anything to Tom. Tom repeatedly tries to call Jessie, who refuses to answer any of his calls.
2	"Spring"	Karen Maine	Rose Matafeo and Alice Snedden	25 April 2021	N/A
Months go by, and Jessie has a one-night stand. She later gets a text from Dan (Jon Pointing), a guy friend she sleeps with from time to time, asking Jessie to grab a drink later that day. After a shift at the cinema, Jessie meets up with Dan at a local pub. Meanwhile, Tom is having lunch with his agent Cath (Minnie Driver) at a nearby restaurant while discussing potential movie roles. Dan confesses to Jessie that he has a girlfriend, foiling Jessie's plans of casual sex with Dan. Jessie books an Uber and leaves Dan alone at the pub. While waiting for the Uber, Tom spots Jessie outside of the restaurant where he was having lunch. Tom says hello to Jessie, but Jessie is still standoffish because she believes Tom has a girlfriend. Tom asks Jessie out for a drink in order to explain himself. Tom walks Jessie home and meets Kate at Jessie's flat. Hearing Jessie and Kate excitedly talking downstairs, Tom changes his mind from previously wanting to stay the night and instead decides to abruptly leave and go back to his own flat, friendzoning Jessie in the process.
3	"Summer"	Karen Maine	Rose Matafeo and Alice Snedden	25 April 2021	N/A
Kate and Jessie host a murder mystery party at their flat with close friends. One of their friends cannot make the party and Kate suggests to Jessie that Jessie call Dan to fill-in. Jessie thinks this is a bad idea, even though she has been sleeping with Dan periodically, and instead calls her supervisor Joe (Joe Barnes), who agrees to come to the party. Jessie, however, later texts Dan to meet up after the party for casual sex. Tom calls Jessie and asks for advice in order to audition for a role playing an Australian character. Jessie agrees to help Tom and invites him over to her flat. Joe arrives at the party, and all the party guests discuss the murder mystery over dinner. Tom arrives and Jessie excuses herself from the party in order to help with Tom's audition in Jessie's bedroom. Kate invites Tom to stay for dinner downstairs, and Tom agrees. They all take part in after dinner games. While cleaning up after the party, Joe talks to Tom and suggests that Jessie is in a relationship with Dan. As Jessie asks Tom to stay over, Dan walks into the flat and starts flirting with Jessie. Tom abruptly leaves, followed by Joe.
4	"Autumn"	Karen Maine	Rose Matafeo and Alice Snedden	25 April 2021	N/A
Jessie waits at the front of the school for the kids that she babysits, only to discover that it was not her day to pick them up. She then goes to see Kate, who works at a flower shop. They return to their flat, and while going through their mail, Kate finds an invitation to a private screening of Tom's new movie. Jessie reluctantly agrees to be Kate's plus one to the screening. Jessie asks to borrow clothes for the screening from the mother of the kids she babysits (Sindhu Vee). At the screening, Kate and Jessie talk to Tom, who introduces them to his co-star Sophie (Nadia Parkes). During the screening, Jessie leaves to go to the bathroom. She finds Tom, who left the screening because he thinks that the movie is terrible. They decide to leave and return to his hotel room. While Jessie is in the bathroom, Sophie appears in the hotel room and refuses to leave. Tom sneaks food into the bathroom and pleads with Jessie to stay there until he figures out how to get Sophie to leave. Hours later, Sophie falls asleep, allowing Jessie to leave.
5	"Winter"	Karen Maine	Rose Matafeo and Alice Snedden	25 April 2021	N/A
Tom and Sophie wrap up a press junket for their new movie, with Tom confessing to a journalist that he and Sophie had sex. Later in private, Sophie rebukes Tom because of his lack of professionalism and discretion about their sex life. Jessie walks by a clothing consignment shop where she previously donated her clothes and asks the shop owner why she does not see her clothes in the display window. The owner believes that Jessie is going through a break-up and suggests that Jessie's clothes were not good enough to be displayed there. Jessie visits the mother of the kids she babysits and learns that she is fired. Jessie later goes to work her shift at the cinema and confronts Joe about talking to Tom about Dan. Joe apologizes and admits that he likes Jessie romantically. Jessie suggests that Joe write down everything he does not like about Jessie so that he can realise that he does not actually like her. Jessie picks up a shift delivering flowers for Kate's flower shop. Kate gives Jessie her paycheck in cash. Jessie returns to the clothing shop to say that she is not going through a break-up and that she also wants to re-purchase her clothes, only to realize that she misplaced all the cash that Kate previously gave to her. Jessie returns to Kate's flower shop and says that she lost all the cash. She then goes to the cinema to pick up a shift. She sees Joe, who completed his list of things that he does not like about Jessie. He reads it aloud. Jessie then starts contemplating leaving London altogether. After listening to Jessie, Joe says that she does not have a shift that evening and that he is now officially over the idea of being romantically involved with her. At the flat, Kate surprises Jessie by giving her back all of her donated clothes. Jessie admits that she is thinking of leaving London for good and returning to New Zealand.
6	"Christmas"	Karen Maine	Rose Matafeo and Alice Snedden	25 April 2021	N/A
Kate and Jessie pick out a Christmas tree and start to decorate for the holidays. Kate wants to give Jessie a proper Christmas before Jessie leaves to go back to New Zealand. Kate and Jessie invite friends over for a pre-Christmas dinner party. After realising that she forgot something for the dinner party, Kate goes out to the corner store, where she sees Tom. She invites Tom back to the flat, and he agrees to join her. Jessie and Tom talk, and Jessie tells Tom that she leaves tomorrow for New Zealand. Jessie excuses herself and gives an update to the other party guests. Meanwhile in the kitchen, Tom eats a few brownies, unbeknownst to him that they are weed brownies. Kate makes an excuse as to why the party guests must all leave so that Jessie and Tom can have the flat to themselves. Tom starts to feel unwell because of the brownies and Jessie takes care of him in her bedroom, distracting him so that he does not focus on being too high. They discuss their relationship before falling asleep. The next morning, Jessie says goodbye to Kate and Tom agrees to go with Jessie on her way to the airport.

=== Series 2 (2022) ===
No.	Title	Directed by	Written by	Original release date	U.K. viewers (millions)
7	"Stay"	Jamie Jay Johnson	Rose Matafeo, Nic Sampson, and Alice Snedden	7 February 2022	N/A
Instead of getting off at the airport bus stop, Jessie stays on the bus with Tom, skipping her flight to New Zealand. Jessie and Tom decide to spend the day together sightseeing in London. They return to Jessie's flat to find Kate and Ian. The four of them go out to eat breakfast, where Jessie and Kate talk about Jessie deciding to stay in London. Jessie and Tom continue their day in an arcade, where Tom decides to surprise Jessie with a plane ticket for her to go visit her family in New Zealand. Jessie is offended rather than flattered by Tom's purchase of the ticket, prompting an argument. Jessie calls her family to tell them she is not coming home to New Zealand, and later proceeds to go to a Magic Mike live show. During intermission, Jessie and Tom talk and make-up before he leaves to go film a movie in Ireland.
8	"Christmas, Again"	Jamie Jay Johnson	Rose Matafeo, Nic Sampson, and Alice Snedden	7 February 2022	N/A
While Kate and Jessie are out eating lunch, they discuss Ian moving in with Kate. Jessie also tells Kate that she declined Tom's offer of having Christmas with his family. While going through their mail, Kate finds a letter Jessie sent. Jessie takes the letter back, explaining that she sent a few people letters when she thought she was leaving London forever. Jessie admits to Kate that she sent a letter to her ex, Ben (Edward Easton). Kate leaves to go visit her family for Christmas. Jessie and Tom meet in a park, where they exchange Christmas gifts. Tom leaves to spend Christmas with his family. Jessie goes to the cinema to catch up with Joe and ask for her position back working at the cinema. Tom is greeted by his parents and his brother Vinay (Parth Thakerar) when he returns home. Jessie goes to visit her friend Steve (Nic Sampson) in order to retrieve the letter she wrote him. Tom tells his family that he is seeing Jessie. The next morning, Jessie opens her Christmas gift from Tom. She spends Christmas day by herself in the flat. Jessie sends a voice note to Tom's phone. Tom helps his parents set up his Christmas gift to them - a new sound system. Tom receives Jessie's voice note and presses play, unknowingly broadcasting the voice note to the new sound system, allowing Tom's family to hear the entirety of Jessie's voice note to Tom. Kate and Ian return to the flat on Christmas night.
9	"Housewarming"	Jamie Jay Johnson	Rose Matafeo, Nic Sampson, and Alice Snedden	7 February 2022	N/A
Jessie arrives at Tom's new flat to celebrate his birthday and New Year's Eve. Guests start to arrive, including Kate and Ian. Tom's brother arrives at the party drunk, wanting to meet Tom's new girlfriend. Tom walks his brother up to his bedroom so that he can sober up, telling his brother that his girlfriend is not at the party. Jessie's friends mingle with Tom's entertainment industry friends. Jessie meets Tom's agent, Cath. While taking a break from the party outside, Jessie and Vinay end up talking to each other, not knowing who the other one is. Jessie makes a new friend at the party and takes some drugs. Jessie and Vinay find out how they are both connected to Tom. Jessie is upset that Tom did not introduce her to his brother earlier. Jessie and Vinay talk in Tom's bedroom towards the end of the night, officially introducing themselves to each other. The next morning, Jessie helps Tom clean up after the party and they agree to stay together and call each other boyfriend and girlfriend.
10	"Funeral"	Jamie Jay Johnson	Rose Matafeo, Nic Sampson, and Alice Snedden	7 February 2022	N/A
Jessie has a brief pregnancy scare. While Tom is in Ireland to film a movie, he and Jessie decide to try phone sex. During their call, Jessie receives another call. She answers, thinking it to be food delivery. Instead, the call is from her ex-boyfriend Ben, who tells Jessie that his grandmother died and that she is invited to the funeral. Jessie accepts the invitation and goes to the funeral. Tom starts filming the movie, directed by Dave (Russell Tovey). Jessie and Ben catch up at the funeral. Meanwhile, Tom keeps doubting himself while on set of his new film. He befriends his personal assistant on set. At the end of the funeral, Ben invites Jessie back to his family's house, which she accepts. While playing a game, Jessie trips and breaks her arm in Ben's bedroom. Jessie and Tom finally catch up over the phone and talk about the days they had.
11	"Valentine's"	Jamie Jay Johnson	Rose Matafeo, Nic Sampson, and Alice Snedden	7 February 2022	N/A
At Tom's flat, Jessie and Tom play a game of Scrabble against Kate and Ian. Later, during her shift at the cinema, Jessie sees Ben. Ben visits Jessie in the projection room and offers her another part-time job at the library where he works. Ben signs Jessie's cast on her arm. Back at the flat, Jessie tells Tom that she has a new part-time job, but does not mention that Ben was the one to offer her the job. Tom then notices Ben's name on Jessie's cast, but does not say anything. Jessie starts her work at the library. Tom grabs lunch with his previous director Dave, who offers Tom a role in his next film. Jessie and Ben hang out at the library after their shifts. At the laundromat, Kate finds out that Jessie is hanging out more with Ben, which she disapproves of. Tom meets Jessie at her flat and they proceed to have an argument over a small misunderstanding concerning paint colours. Kate comes back to the flat and encounters Tom alone, taking a break from fighting with Jessie. Kate misunderstands the reason for the fight and proceeds to tell Tom that Jessie has been working with Ben. Jessie and Tom continue the argument and decide to split up. Ben comes over to comfort Jessie after the fight, and Jessie realizes that Ben still has romantic feelings for her.
12	"Party"	Jamie Jay Johnson	Rose Matafeo, Nic Sampson, and Alice Snedden	7 February 2022	N/A
Three months later, Steve and Sarah (Lola-Rose Maxwell) have a pre-wedding night out with Jessie, Ben, Kate, Ian, and Joe. Tom shows up for the party, as Steve had previously invited him not thinking he would actually come. Tom and Jessie exchange pleasantries and meet up with the group to play miniature golf. Jessie and Ben argue while playing golf, as Ben wants to continue seeing each other and Jessie does not. The group continues their night out and goes to play laser tag. Later on during karaoke in the party bus, Tom tells Jessie that he accepted Dave's movie role offer that starts filming shortly in the U.S. Jessie and Tom discuss how their relationship fell apart and where they stand now. The group goes to a lake and uses two boats to paddle around. In one boat, Jessie talks to Kate, Joe, and Sarah about her relationship with Tom. In the other boat, Tom and Ben introduce themselves to each other, and are accompanied by Ian and Steve. Kate tells Jessie some hard truths, which makes Jessie get out of the boat and start wading in the water to talk to Tom. Tom jumps in the water to be with her, and they profess their love for each other.

=== Series 3 (2023) ===
No.	Title	Directed by	Written by	Original release date	U.K. viewers (millions)
1	"Episode One"	Rose Matafeo and Alice Snedden	Rose Matafeo, Nic Sampson, and Alice Snedden	28 August 2023	N/A
2	"Episode Two"	Rose Matafeo and Alice Snedden	Rose Matafeo, Nic Sampson, and Alice Snedden	28 August 2023	N/A
3	"Episode Three"	Rose Matafeo and Alice Snedden	Rose Matafeo, Nic Sampson, and Alice Snedden	28 August 2023	N/A
4	"Episode Four"	Rose Matafeo and Alice Snedden	Rose Matafeo, Nic Sampson, and Alice Snedden	28 August 2023	N/A
5	"Episode Five"	Rose Matafeo and Alice Snedden	Rose Matafeo, Nic Sampson, and Alice Snedden	28 August 2023	N/A
6	"Episode Six"	Rose Matafeo and Alice Snedden	Rose Matafeo, Nic Sampson, and Alice Snedden	28 August 2023	N/A

== Production ==
Sidi and Matafeo were real-life flatmates in London. The idea for the plot came in part from a group of Matafeo's Kiwi friends who one night in a London pub ran into a major Hollywood actor and hung out with him all night. Filming was due to begin in March 2020 but was postponed by the COVID-19 pandemic until October 2020.

HBO Max announced that Starstruck was renewed for a second series on 10 June 2021, the day it debuted on the streaming network. Russell Tovey was announced as a new cast member for series two.

In June 2022 it was announced the series had been renewed for a third season. In January 2023 Matafeo uploaded photographs from the set to her Instagram.

== Release ==
Starstruck series 1 started broadcast in the UK on 26 April 2021 on BBC One, with the whole series available from 25 April 2021 on BBC iPlayer. It screened on TVNZ in New Zealand, ABC TV in Australia. Series 1 was released on HBO Max on 10 June 2021. Series 2 was released online in its entirety on BBC iPlayer on 7 February 2022.

Series 3 was released on 28 August 2023 on BBC Three and started on 1 September 2023 on BBC One.

== Reception ==
Critical response of Starstruck
Season	Rotten Tomatoes	Metacritic
1	100% (36 reviews)	78 (11 reviews)
2	93% (27 reviews)	74 (13 reviews)
3	95% (20 reviews)	84 (8 reviews)

The series received critical acclaim. The Times described it as "expertly crafted old-school screwball comedy, crackling with wit and sexual chemistry." Series one holds a 100% on review aggregator Rotten Tomatoes.

== Accolades ==
In January 2023 Matafeo received a nomination for Outstanding Comedy Actress for her work on Starstruck at the National Comedy Awards 2023.

Matafeo was nominated in the Comedy Performance (Female) category at the Royal Television Society Programme Awards in March 2023.
