= Philippa Gould =

New Zealand swimmer

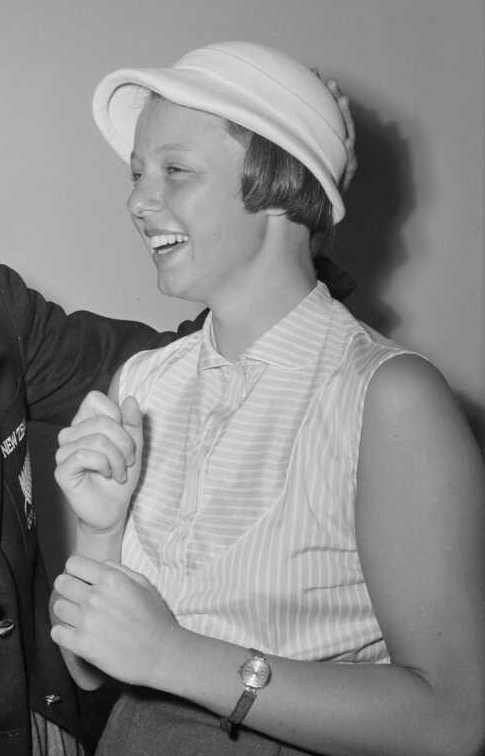
- Gould in 1956

Personal information
- Born: 4 December 1940 (age 85) Auckland, New Zealand

Sport
- Sport: Swimming
Medal record
Representing New Zealand
British Empire and Commonwealth Games
Bronze medal – third place	1958 Cardiff	110 yd backstroke

Philippa Mary "Pip" Gould, later Philippa Gower, (born 4 December 1940) is a former backstroke swimmer from New Zealand. She competed at the 1956 Summer Olympics placing sixth in her heat of the 100 m backstroke. In January 1957, she broke the 200 m (220 yd) backstroke world record, and in March 1958, she broke the 100 m (110 yd) backstroke record, while still a student at St Cuthbert's College, Auckland.

At the 1958 British Empire and Commonwealth Games she won the bronze medal in the 110 yd backstroke. In 1995 Gould was inducted into the New Zealand Sports Hall of Fame. Philippa also in 1957 was the Halberg Sportswoman of the year now known as the ISPS Handa Halberg Awards. To this day she still teaches and continues to swim competing in harbour swims. In 2017 her granddaughter Annabelle entered her into the Masters World Games. Philippa competed in the 50m and 200m backstroke winning Silver in both events. She also won gold in the 100m backstroke.

Records
Preceded by Geertje Wielema	Women's 200 metres backstroke world record holder (long course); 16 January 1957 – 17 May 1957	Succeeded by Lenie de Nijs
