= William Yuill =

Rhodesian international lawn bowler

Personal information
- Nationality: Southern Rhodesia
Medal record
Representing Southern Rhodesia
Commonwealth Games
Bronze medal – third place	1958 Cardiff	pairs

William C Yuill is a former Rhodesian international lawn bowler.

He won a bronze medal in the pairs at the 1958 Commonwealth Games with Hector Philp.
