= Warwick Snedden =

New Zealand cricketer

Personal information
- Full name: Warwick Nesbit Snedden
- Born: 10 July 1920; Auckland, New Zealand
- Died: 25 December 1990 (aged 70); Auckland, New Zealand
- Batting: Right-handed
- Bowling: Right-arm medium
- Role: Batsman
- Relatives: Nessie Snedden (father); Martin Snedden (son); Michael Snedden (grandson); Alice Snedden (granddaughter); Colin Snedden (brother); Cyril Snedden (uncle); Owen Snedden (uncle)

Domestic team information
- Years: Team
- 1946/47: Auckland

Career statistics
Competition	First-class
Matches	2
Runs scored	92
Batting average	30.66
100s/50s	0/1
Top score	75
Catches/stumpings	1/0
- Source: CricInfo, 28 May 2009

Warwick Nesbit Snedden (10 July 1920 – 25 December 1990) was a New Zealand cricketer who played two matches for Auckland in the 1946–47 season. A right-handed batsman and right-arm medium bowler, Snedden made 92 runs from his two matches at 30.66, largely from one knock of 75. His father, Nessie Snedden and brother Colin Snedden both played first-class cricket, while his son Martin Snedden played 25 Tests and 93 One Day Internationals for New Zealand.
