= Peter Aitchison (rower) =

New Zealand rower

Personal information
- Born: Peter David Aitchison
- Spouse: Sylvia Dawn Aitchison

Sport
- Sport: Rowing
- Club: Union Boat Club, Whanganui

Peter David Aitchison is a former New Zealand rower and manufacturer of farming equipment.

A member of the Union Boat Club in Whanganui, Aitchison was a member of the victorious Union crew—along with Donald Gemmell, Frank Crotty, Graeme Moran and Richard Tuffin (coxswain)—that won the coxed fours title at the New Zealand national rowing championships in 1958. The same crew went on to represent New Zealand at the 1958 British Empire and Commonwealth Games in Cardiff, finishing fourth.

Aitchison went on to have a successful career as a manufacturer, importer and exporter of farming equipment, founding Aitchison Industries based in Whanganui. The company produces and exports seed drills, cultivators, fertiliser spreaders and other farming equipment around the world.

In 2001, Aitchison and his wife, Sylvia, retired to the Wellington suburb of Roseneath. In 2015, the couple made national headlines after their neighbour built a four-metre high fence blocking their view of Wellington harbour. After a legal battle, the Environment Court ordered the fence be removed in January 2016.
