= Michael Purdon =

Scottish lawn bowler

Personal information
- Nationality: Scottish

Sport
- Club: Rankin Park, Greenock
Medal record
Representing SCO
Commonwealth Games
Silver medal – second place	1962 Perth	pairs
Silver medal – second place	1962 Perth	fours

Michael Wilson Purdon is a former Scottish international lawn bowler.

== Bowls career ==
He won two silver medals in the pairs with Thomas Hamill and fours at the 1962 British Empire and Commonwealth Games in Perth with Thomas Hamill, Joseph Black and William Moore.

He also won the 1960 pairs title with Hamill at the Scottish National Bowls Championships.
