= Thomas Hamill (bowls) =

Scottish lawn bowler

Personal information
- Nationality: Scottish

Sport
- Club: Rankin Park, Greenock
Medal record
Representing SCO
Commonwealth Games
Silver medal – second place	1962 Perth	pairs
Silver medal – second place	1962 Perth	fours

Thomas F Hamill is a former Scottish international lawn bowler.

== Bowls career ==
He won two silver medals in the pairs with Michael Purdon and fours at the 1962 British Empire and Commonwealth Games in Perth with Joseph Black, William Moore and Michael Purdon.

He also won the 1960 pairs title with Purdon at the Scottish National Bowls Championships.
