= Edward Stuart (bowls) =

Personal information
- Nationality: South Africa Scotland
- Born: 1 February 1894 Aberdeen, Scotland
- Died: 3 August 1985 (aged 91) Cape Town, South Africa

Sport
- Sport: lawn bowls
- Club: Observatory BC
Medal record
Representing (South Africa)
Commonwealth Games
Silver medal – second place	1958 Cardiff	fours

Edward Stanley Graham Stuart (1894 - 1985), was a South African international lawn bowler.

== Bowls career ==
He won a silver medal in the fours at the 1958 British Empire and Commonwealth Games in Cardiff, with Norman Snowy Walker, Wilfred Randall and Edward Williams.

He won the 1957 rinks at the National Championships, bowling for the Observatory Bowls Club.

== Personal life ==
He was born in Scotland and was an electrician and engineer by trade.
