= Sam Gardiner (bowls) =

English-born Canadian international lawn bowler

Personal information
- Nationality: Canada
- Born: 12 September 1888 Sunderland, England
- Died: 30 June 1968 (aged 79) North Vancouver, Canada

Sport
- Club: North Vancouver BC
Medal record
Representing Canada
Commonwealth Games
Silver medal – second place	1954 Vancouver	pairs

Samuel Cooper Gardiner was an English born Canadian international lawn bowler.

== Bowls career ==
He won a silver medal in the pairs at the 1954 British Empire and Commonwealth Games in Vancouver with Dick Williams and was the President of the North Vancouver Lawn Bowling Club.

== Awards ==
Both he and Dick Williams were inducted into the North Shore Sports Hall of Fame in 1968.

== Personal life ==
He emigrated to Canada at the age of 20.
