= John Bettles =

British lawn bowler

Personal information
- Nationality: British (English)
- Born: 30 March 1907 Raunds, Northamptonshire, England
- Died: 30 April 1983 (aged 76) Raunds, Northamptonshire, England

Sport
- Club: Raunds Methodists BC; Northamptonshire
Medal record
Representing (England)
Commonwealth Games
Gold medal – first place	1958 Cardiff	fours

John Harris Bettles (1907–1983) was an England international lawn bowler.

== Bowls career ==
He won a gold medal for the England team in the fours at the 1958 British Empire and Commonwealth Games in Cardiff with Norman King, John Scadgell and Walter Phillips.

== Personal life ==
He took up bowls in 1931 and was shoe and boot operative by trade.
