= John Myrdal (bowls) =

Personal information
- Nationality: South Africa
- Born: January 28, 1911 South Africa

Sport
- Sport: lawn bowls
- Club: Sherwood BC
Medal record
Representing (South Africa)
Commonwealth Games
Silver medal – second place	1958 Cardiff	pairs

John Alfred Myrdal (1911 – date of death unknown), was a South African international lawn bowler.

== Bowls career ==
He won a silver medal in the pairs at the 1958 British Empire and Commonwealth Games in Cardiff, with Rudolph van Vuuren.

He won the 1956 rinks at the National Championships bowling for the Sherwood Bowls Club.

== Personal life ==
He was a Company Director by trade.
