= Pinky Danilowitz =

South African international bowls player

Personal information
- Nationality: South Africa
- Born: 1 August 1908

Sport
- Club: Kadimah Krugersdorp BC
Medal record
Men's Lawn bowls
Representing South Africa
British Empire Games
Gold medal – first place	1958 Cardiff	Singles

Abraham Phineas 'Pinky' Danilowitz, was a South African international bowls player who won a gold medal at the Commonwealth Games.

== Bowls career ==
At the 1958 British Empire and Commonwealth Games he won the gold medal in the singles event.

He also won the 1957 singles at the National Championships bowling for the Kadimah Krugersdorp Bowls Club.

== Personal life ==
He was a Timber Merchant by trade.
