= Joseph Black (bowls) =

Scottish lawn bowler

Personal information
- Nationality: British (Scottish)
- Born: c. 1909
- Died: c. 1988 (aged 79)

Sport
- Sport: Bowls
- Club: Sanquhar BC
Medal record
Representing SCO
Commonwealth Games
Silver medal – second place	1962 Perth	singles
Silver medal – second place	1962 Perth	fours

Joseph Watson Black (c. 1909–c. 1988) was a Scottish international lawn bowler.

== Biography ==
Black was a miner by trade, being the pit deputy at the Fauld Hill Pit in Dumfries and Galloway.

He won two silver medals in the singles and fours at the 1962 British Empire and Commonwealth Games in Perth with Thomas Hamill, William Moore and Michael Purdon.

In 1962 Black equalled the record for wins in the Scottish National men's singles championship, held equally by Robert Sprot and David Dall. His three titles which he won in 1958, 1959 and 1962, was not beaten until 2025, when Iain McLean won his fourth.
