= John Milligan (bowls) =

Rhodesia and Nyasaland international lawn bowler

Personal information
- Nationality: Rhodesia and Nyasaland
Medal record
Representing Rhodesia and Nyasaland
Commonwealth Games
Bronze medal – third place	1962 Perth	fours

John Milligan, was a Rhodesia and Nyasaland international lawn bowler.

== Bowls career ==
He won a bronze medal in the fours at the 1962 British Empire and Commonwealth Games in Perth with Malcolm Bibb, Ronnie Turner and Victor Blyth.

He also represented North Rhodesia during the 1954 British Empire and Commonwealth Games.
