= Walter Phillips (bowls) =

British lawn bowler

Personal information
- Nationality: British (English)

Sport
- Club: Boscombe Cliff BC
Medal record
Representing (England)
Commonwealth Games
Gold medal – first place	1958 Cardiff	fours

Walter F Phillips is an England international lawn bowler.

== Bowls career ==
He won a gold medal for the England team in the fours at the 1958 British Empire and Commonwealth Games in Cardiff with Norman King, John Scadgell and John Bettles.

He was twice a runner-up in the National Championships; in the singles in 1968 and fours in 1968.
