= Nessie Snedden =

New Zealand cricketer (1892–1968)

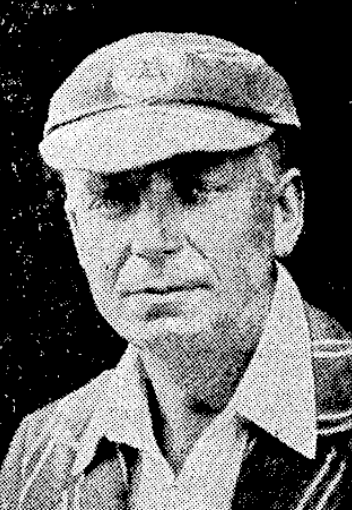
- Snedden in 1931

Personal information
- Full name: Andrew Nesbit Colin Snedden
- Born: 3 April 1892; Auckland, New Zealand
- Died: 27 September 1968 (aged 76); Auckland, New Zealand
- Batting: Right-handed
- Bowling: Right-arm medium
- Role: All-rounder
- Relatives: Colin Snedden (son); Warwick Snedden (son); Martin Snedden (grandson); Alice Snedden (great-granddaughter); Michael Snedden (great-grandson); Cyril Snedden (brother); Owen Snedden (brother); Stanley Snedden (cousin)

Domestic team information
- Years: Team
- 1909/10–1927/28: Auckland

Career statistics
Competition	First-class
Matches	49
Runs scored	2,492
Batting average	30.02
100s/50s	2/14
Top score	139
Balls bowled	4,857
Wickets	95
Bowling average	26.33
5 wickets in innings	4
10 wickets in match	0
Best bowling	5/13
Catches/stumpings	20/–
- Source: Cricinfo, 26 June 2018

Andrew Nesbit Colin "Nessie" Snedden (3 April 1892 – 27 September 1968) was a New Zealand cricketer. He played first-class cricket for Auckland between 1909 and 1928, and captained New Zealand in the days before New Zealand played Test cricket.

== Cricket career ==
At the time of his first-class debut at the age of 17 in December 1909, Snedden was the youngest player to represent Auckland. His highest first-class score was 139, which he made when captaining Auckland against Hawke's Bay in 1920–21; in the same match he also took 5 for 13 (his best bowling figures) and 2 for 21, and Auckland won by an innings and 354 runs. He scored his other first-class century against Otago in 1925–26, when Auckland needed 271 for victory and he scored 131 not out, making the winning hit with a four to take Auckland to victory by five wickets.

Snedden toured Australia with the New Zealand team in 1913-14. He was the last player to dismiss Victor Trumper in first-class cricket: leg before wicket for 81 in Australia's victory over New Zealand at Eden Park on 28 March 1914.

He captained Auckland from 1919–20 to 1923–24, and captained New Zealand in two matches against the touring MCC team in 1922-23. For most of the period between 1922 and 1937 he was a national selector.

== Personal life ==
Snedden was born in Auckland and educated at Sacred Heart College, Auckland. He became a law clerk, then a solicitor, taking a partnership in the Auckland firm of Wake, Anderson and Snedden in 1919. He married Alice McDonnell in Auckland in April 1917. He served overseas with the New Zealand Expeditionary Force in World War I as a lieutenant. Wake, Anderson and Snedden was dissolved in 1925 and he continued in the partnership Anderson and Snedden.

His son Colin Snedden and grandson Martin Snedden played Test cricket for New Zealand. His brother Cyril and another son, Warwick, also played first-class cricket in New Zealand, as has Martin's son Michael Snedden. Cyril was also President of the New Zealand Rugby League.
