= Len Hodge =

New Zealand diver

Personal information
- Born: Raymond Leonard Hodge; 1941 or 1942 (age 84–85)

Sport
- Country: New Zealand
- Sport: Diving
- Coached by: Les Donaldson; Stewart Hodge

Achievements and titles
- National finals: Diving champion (1958, 1959, 1960, 1961, 1962); Men's springboard champion (1963)

Raymond Leonard Hodge (born 1941 or 1942) is a former New Zealand diver, who represented his country at the 1958 British Empire and Commonwealth Games in Cardiff, Wales.

Representing Canterbury, Hodge was the New Zealand national diving champion every year from 1958 to 1962, and was the national men's springboard diving champion in 1963.

At the 1958 British Empire and Commonwealth Games, Hodge competed in the men's 3-metre springboard event, finishing in sixth place.
