= Colin Snedden =

New Zealand cricketer (1918–2011)

- The New Zealand Test team, Christchurch, March 1947. Colin Snedden is third from the left in the middle row. Seated in front of him are Jack Cowie and Walter Hadlee.

Personal information
- Full name: Colin Alexander Snedden
- Born: 7 January 1918; Auckland, New Zealand
- Died: 24 April 2011 (aged 93); New Zealand
- Height: 6 ft 3 1/2 in (1.92 m)
- Batting: Right-handed
- Bowling: Right-arm offbreak
- Relatives: Nessie Snedden (father); Warwick Snedden (brother); Martin Snedden (nephew); Michael Snedden (great-nephew); Alice Snedden (great-niece); Cyril Snedden (uncle); Owen Snedden (uncle)

International information
- National side: New Zealand (1947)
- Only Test (cap 43): 21 March 1947 v England

Career statistics
Competition	Test	First-class
Matches	1	9
Runs scored	–	44
Batting average	–	8.80
100s/50s	–	0/0
Top score	–	14
Balls bowled	96	2,040
Wickets	0	31
Bowling average	–	25.41
5 wickets in innings	–	1
10 wickets in match	–	0
Best bowling	–	6/59
Catches/stumpings	0/–	7/–
- Source: Cricinfo, 1 April 2017

Colin Alexander Snedden (7 January 1918 – 24 April 2011) was a New Zealand Test cricketer.

His father, Nessie Snedden, and brother, Warwick Snedden, both played first-class cricket; Warwick's son, Martin Snedden, played in 25 Tests and 93 One Day Internationals for New Zealand.

== Cricket career ==
Born in Auckland, Snedden attended Sacred Heart College, Auckland. He played first-class cricket for the Auckland cricket team. Six feet three and a half inches (1.92 m) tall and strongly built, he weighed about 143 kilograms during his playing days. Bowling quick off-breaks, he played one match before the Second World War, then resumed his career eight seasons later in 1946–47. He took five wickets against Otago then eight wickets against Canterbury, including 6 for 59 off 34 overs in the second innings.

He was selected for the single Test for New Zealand against England, at Christchurch in March 1947. Five other New Zealanders made their debut in the same match. New Zealand declared their first innings at 345 for 9; Snedden was the number 11 batsman so he did not get a chance to bat. He bowled 16 overs, but the third and fourth days were washed out, and the match was abandoned as a draw.

Snedden played a few matches in two more seasons before retiring.

== Later life and death ==
Following his retirement from playing, Snedden was a radio commentator on cricket and rugby. He described cricket and rugby matches at Eden Park in Auckland from 1950 until 1986.

On the death of Eric Tindill on 1 August 2010, Snedden became the oldest surviving New Zealand Test cricketer. On 24 April 2011, he died in his sleep at the age of 93.

== Personal life ==
Snedden married Mary O'Callaghan in Auckland in July 1940. A problem with the arch of his left foot rendered him medically unfit for active service in World War II, and he spent the war as a training officer in New Zealand.

== See also ==
- One-Test wonder
