= Michael Snedden =

New Zealand cricketer (born 1992)

Personal information
- Born: 20 September 1992 (age 34)
- Relatives: Martin Snedden (father); Warwick Snedden (grandfather); Nessie Snedden (great-grandfather); Alice Snedden (cousin); Colin Snedden (great-uncle)
- Source: Cricinfo, 10 November 2018

Michael Snedden (born 20 September 1992) is a New Zealand cricketer. He made his List A debut for Auckland in the 2018–19 Ford Trophy on 10 November 2018. He made his first-class debut on 29 October 2019, for Wellington in the 2019–20 Plunket Shield season. On making his debut, Snedden became the first fourth-generation cricketer to play first-class cricket in New Zealand.

In June 2020, he was offered a contract by Wellington ahead of the 2020–21 domestic cricket season. He made his Twenty20 debut on 24 December 2020, for Wellington in the 2020–21 Super Smash.
