= Alice Snedden =

New Zealand comedian and writer

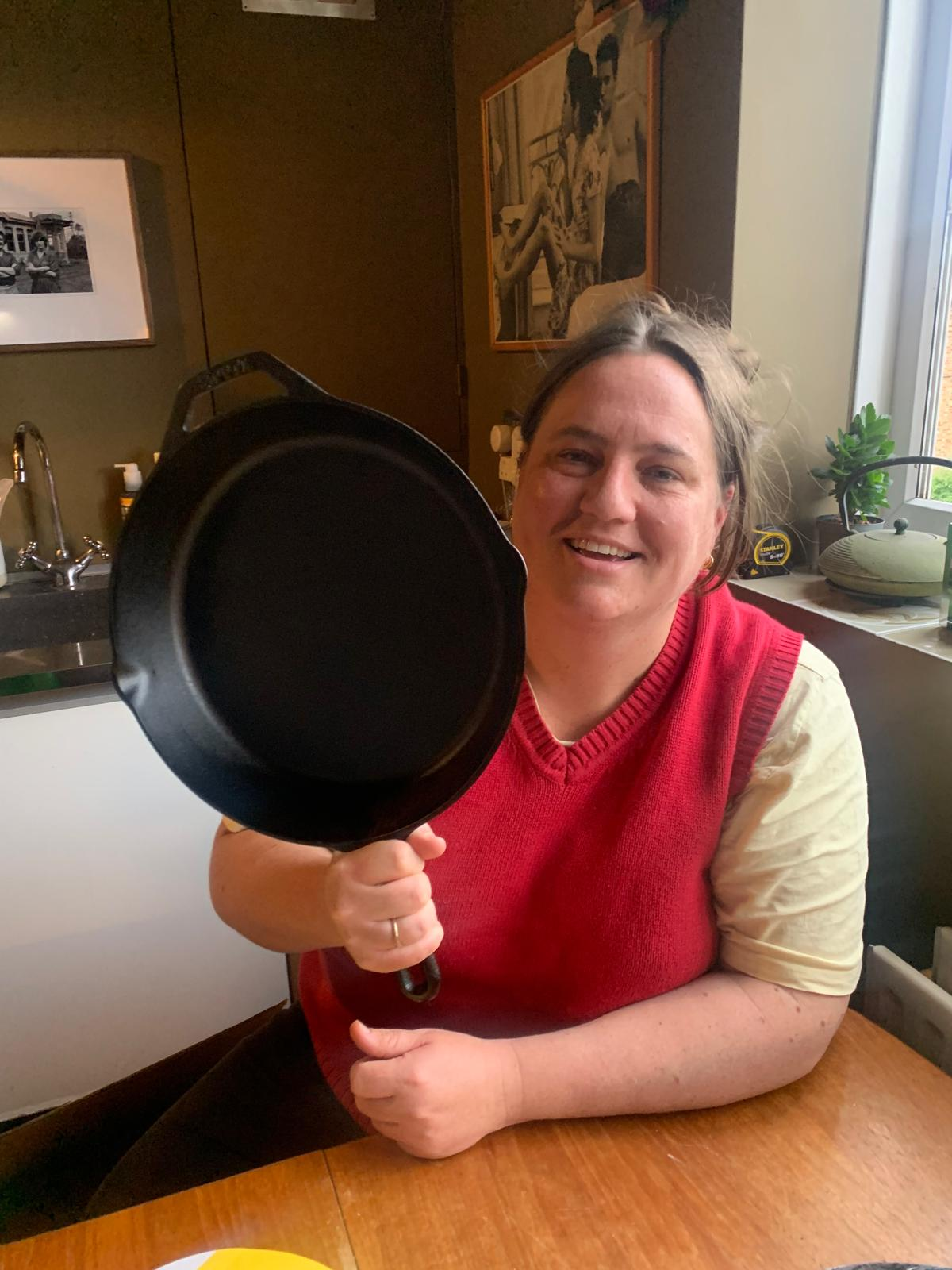
- Snedden in 2026
- Born: Alice Josephine Snedden; 1987 or 1988 (age 38–39); Auckland, New Zealand
- Occupations: Comedian, Writer, Actor, Director
- Years active: 2016–present
- Relatives: Warwick Snedden (grandfather); Martin Snedden (uncle); Michael Snedden (cousin); Nessie Snedden (great-grandfather); Colin Snedden (great-uncle)

Alice Josephine Snedden is a New Zealand stand-up comedian, television writer and actress. First working as a writer on New Zealand comedy shows such as Funny Girls, Jono and Ben and 7 Days, Snedden created the series Alice Snedden's Bad News, a documentary-comedy series written by and starring herself. In 2021, she co-wrote the BBC comedy series Starstruck alongside Rose Matafeo, who co-wrote and starred in the production.

She directed the upcoming Channel 4 TV comedy series Break Clause, and is currently directing the BBC comedy Opening Up, starring Amy Gledhill.

== Early life ==
Snedden grew up in Auckland, the youngest of five children in a Catholic family. Her father Patrick Snedden ran a publishing company, and since has had positions including the chairman of The Big Idea, Housing New Zealand Corporation, Auckland District Health Board and director of the Ports of Auckland.

Snedden comes from an extended family of professional cricket players, including Warwick Snedden, Nessie Snedden, Colin Snedden, Martin Snedden and Michael Snedden. Snedden attended the University of Otago, first studying physical education and politics before deciding to study law. Snedden graduated and was admitted to the bar, however has never practised law. The night before she was admitted to the bar, Snedden performed her first stand-up comedy set.

== Career ==
To save money for a trip to New York, Snedden got a job at The Basement Theatre in Auckland. Comedian Eli Matthewson encouraged her to try out for the comedy improv show SNORT (which included a cast of Rose Matafeo and Laura Daniel), which developed Snedden's love of comedy and improvisation. When Snedden travelled to the United States, she enrolled at the Upright Citizens Brigade.

After returning to New Zealand, Snedden met with producer Bronwynn Bakker in order to write for season two of the Rose Matafeo comedy show Funny Girls. Bakker was impressed by Snedden's pitches, and employed her for both Funny Girls and Bakker's other comedy programme Jono and Ben. In 2016, Snedden became a columnist for Stuff and the Sunday Star-Times. During the same period, Snedden began to work for the panel show 7 Days, first as a writer and later as a recurring panelist. Snedden was the head writer for episodes of Funny Girls and Jono and Ben, and became the head writer for Golden Boy (2019).

Snedden performed her first stand-up show, Alice Snedden: Self-Titled, at the New Zealand International Comedy Festival in 2017, later bringing the show to the Edinburgh Festival Fringe in 2018. Snedden was nominated for the 2018 Billy T Award.

In 2018, she became the host and writer of Alice Snedden's Bad News, a documentary comedy series focusing on New Zealand political and social issues.

Snedden co-wrote the BBC series Starstruck alongside Rose Matafeo, with whom she had hosted the podcast Boners of the Heart since 2016.

In 2025, Snedden appeared in series 6 of Taskmaster New Zealand.

== Personal life ==
During her 2019 show Absolute Monster, Snedden discussed coming to terms with her bisexuality.

== Filmography ==
=== Film ===
Year	Title	Role
2020	Baby Done	Antenatal Teacher

=== Television ===
Year	Title	Role	Notes
2016	Funny Girls	Various	Actor (1 episode). Head writer (1 episode)
2016–2020	7 Days	Self - Team member	12 episodes. Writer (51 episodes)
2016	Stake Out	Parking Warden	1 episode
2017	Jono and Ben		Head writer (3 episodes), writer
2018	The Project	Self - Whip Around Reporter	1 episode
2019	Golden Boy		Head writer (8 episodes)
2018-2022	Alice Snedden's Bad News	Self	Creator and host (20 episodes)
2020	Educators	Midwife	5 episodes
2020	Frankie Boyle's New World Order		Writer (2 episodes)
2021	Starstruck	Amelia	2 episodes. Writer (12 episodes)
2021	Have You Been Paying Attention?	Self	New Zealand version
2025	Taskmaster New Zealand	Self	10 episodes
