= Jose da Luz =

Hong Kongese-American lawn bowler

Jose Alberto da Luz
Personal information
- Nationality: Hong Kong; United States
- Born: 19 October 1904 Hong Kong
- Died: 26 October 1986 (aged 82) California, United States
Medal record
Representing (Hong Kong)
Commonwealth Games
Silver medal – second place	1954 Vancouver	fours

Jose Alberto da Luz (1904-1986) was an international lawn bowler from Hong Kong.

== Bowls career ==
He won a silver medal in the fours at the 1954 British Empire and Commonwealth Games in Vancouver, with Alfred Coates, Robert Gourlay and his brother Raoul da Luz.

== Personal life ==
Of Portuguese origin he was born in Hong Kong and became a US citizen in 1964.
