= Enid McElwee =

New Zealand fencer

Enid Milne
Personal information
- Born: Frances Enid Wheeler; 24 March 1914 Feilding, New Zealand
- Died: 10 November 2001 (aged 87) Paekākāriki, New Zealand
- Spouses: 1. George Portlock McElwee; 2. Ian McIntosh Milne
- Relative: Leon Götz (uncle)

Sport
- Country: New Zealand
- Sport: Fencing
- Club: Canterbury Swords Club

Frances Enid Milne (formerly McElwee, née Wheeler; 24 March 1914 – 10 November 2001) was a New Zealand fencer, who represented her country at the 1958 British Empire and Commonwealth Games.

== Early life and family ==
Born Frances Enid Wheeler in Feilding on 24 March 1914, Milne was the daughter of Dorothy Maude Wheeler (née Götz)—the sister of Leon Götz—and Arthur Leslie Wheeler. She married George Portlock McElwee of Christchurch in 1936, but the couple later divorced, and she married Ian McIntosh Milne.

== Fencing ==
McElwee was a member of the Canterbury Swords Club. At the 1958 British Empire and Commonwealth Games in Cardiff, she represented New Zealand in the individual women's foil. After recording three wins and three losses in the elimination pool, she progressed to the final pool where she had four wins and three losses to finish in fourth place overall.

== Death ==
Milne died in Paekākāriki on 10 November 2001.
