= John Scadgell =

British lawn bowler

Personal information
- Nationality: British (English)
- Born: May 26, 1912 Hampshire, England
- Died: 2002 Worthing, England

Sport
- Club: Worthing BC
Medal record
Representing (England)
Commonwealth Games
Gold medal – first place	1958 Cardiff	fours
British Isles Championships
Gold medal – first place	1962	fours

George Harry Scadgell known as John Scadgell (1912–2002) was an England international lawn bowler.

== Bowls career ==
Scadgell won a gold medal for the England team in the fours at the 1958 British Empire and Commonwealth Games in Cardiff with Norman King, John Bettles and Walter Phillips.

He won three National Championship titles, two in the pairs (1955 and 1966) and once in the fours (1961). He also finished runner-up to Peter Line in the 1964 singles.

== Personal life ==
He and his father H G (George) Scadgell both bowled for Worthing and ran a House and hotel furnishing company.
