= Martin Snedden =

New Zealand cricketer

Martin Snedden CNZM
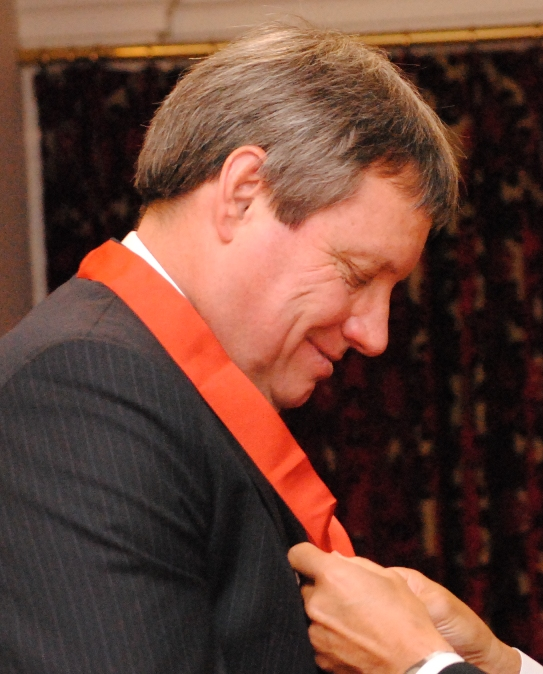
- Snedden in 2012

Personal information
- Full name: Martin Colin Snedden
- Born: 23 November 1958 (age 67); Auckland, New Zealand
- Batting: Left-handed
- Bowling: Right-arm medium-fast
- Role: Bowler
- Relatives: Warwick Snedden (father); Michael Snedden (son); Nessie Snedden (grandfather); Colin Snedden (uncle); Alice Snedden (niece); Cyril Snedden (great-uncle); Owen Snedden (great-uncle)

International information
- National side: New Zealand (1980–1990)
- Test debut (cap 149): 21 February 1981 v India
- Last Test: 5 July 1990 v England
- ODI debut (cap 37): 23 November 1980 v Australia
- Last ODI: 1 May 1990 v Pakistan

Career statistics
Competition	Test	ODI	FC	LA
Matches	25	93	118	151
Runs scored	327	535	1,792	1,101
Batting average	14.86	15.28	18.86	17.20
100s/50s	0/0	0/1	0/6	0/3
Top score	33*	64	69	79
Balls bowled	4,775	4,525	9,918	4,794
Wickets	58	114	387	209
Bowling average	37.91	28.39	25.62	22.93
5 wickets in innings	1	0	15	1
10 wickets in match	0	0	2	0
Best bowling	5/68	4/34	8/73	5/19
Catches/stumpings	7/–	19/–	55/–	35/–
- Source: Cricinfo, 4 February 2017

Martin Colin Snedden CNZM (born 23 November 1958) is a former New Zealand cricketer, who played 25 cricket tests, and 93 One Day Internationals, between 1980 and 1990. He was a member of New Zealand's seam bowling attack, alongside Richard Hadlee and Ewen Chatfield, throughout its golden age in the 1980s.

== Early life and family ==
Snedden was born in 1958 in Auckland. His uncle, Colin Snedden, played one Test for New Zealand; his father, Warwick Snedden, and grandfather, Nessie Snedden, both also played first-class cricket. His brother, Patrick Snedden, is a company director and philanthropist.

Snedden was educated at Rosmini College in Auckland, and played in the New Zealand secondary schools cricket team alongside Jeff Crowe and the Bracewell brothers, John and Brendon. He studied law at the University of Otago, where he met his wife, Annie, also a law student, and they married in about 1983. The couple went on to have four children, including Michael, who made his first-class cricket debut for Wellington in October 2019, and became the first fourth-generation cricketer to play first-class cricket in New Zealand.

== International career ==
Snedden's best Test figures were 5 for 68 in New Zealand's victory over West Indies in Christchurch in 1986–87. He was the first bowler to concede 100 runs in a One Day International with figures of 12–1–105–2 from a 60-over match; it remained the record for most runs conceded until surpassed by Mick Lewis in March 2006. Snedden was usually a lower-order batsman though he once scored 64 opening the innings in a One Day International. He also represented Auckland in New Zealand provincial cricket.

During 1980–81 Australia Tri-Nation Series, Snedden was believed to have made a fair catch by the TV replay footage at the boundary ropes. However, the on-field umpires ruled that Greg Chappell was not out and he went on to score 90 runs in a game Australia won controversially.

== Beyond cricket ==
Snedden, a lawyer by profession, was for some years the chief executive officer of New Zealand Cricket. He left NZC to head the 2011 Rugby World Cup Organising Team in 2007. Snedden was made a Companion of the New Zealand Order of Merit in the 2012 New Year Honours, for services to sporting administration. He rejoined the NZC board in 2013 and was elected as its chair in December 2020. He stepped down from the board in November 2024.
