= William Moore (bowls) =

Scottish international lawn bowler

Personal information
- Nationality: Scottish

Sport
- Club: Dreghorn BC
Medal record
Representing SCO
Commonwealth Games
Silver medal – second place	1962 Perth	fours

William Moore is a former Scottish international lawn bowler.

== Bowls career ==
He won a silver medal in the fours at the 1962 British Empire and Commonwealth Games in Perth with Thomas Hamill, Joseph Black and Michael Purdon.

He also won the Scottish National Bowls Championships fours title in 1960 and the pairs title with Jimmy McIntyre in 1969.
