= Rudolph van Vuuren (bowls) =

Personal information
- Nationality: South Africa
- Born: February 11, 1908
Medal record
Representing (South Africa)
Commonwealth Games
Silver medal – second place	1958 Cardiff	pairs

Rudolph T van Vuuren (1908 - date of death unknown), was a South African international lawn bowler.

== Bowls career ==
He won a silver medal in the pairs at the 1958 British Empire and Commonwealth Games in Cardiff, with John Myrdal.

== Personal life ==
He was a Company Manager by trade.
