= Owen Snedden =

New Zealand Roman Catholic priest (1917–1981)

The Right Reverend Owen Snedden MBE
- Auxiliary Bishop of Wellington
- Church: Roman Catholic Church
- Archdiocese: Archdiocese of Wellington
- In office: 1962 to 1981

Personal details
- Born: 15 December 1917 Auckland, New Zealand
- Died: 17 April 1981 (aged 63) Wellington, New Zealand
- Relatives: Cyril Snedden (brother); Nessie Snedden (brother); Stanley Snedden (cousin); Colin Snedden (nephew); Warwick Snedden (nephew); Martin Snedden (great-nephew)

Owen Noel Snedden, MBE (15 December 1917 – 17 April 1981) was Roman Catholic Auxiliary Bishop of Wellington, New Zealand (from 1962 to 1981). He was the first Auckland-born priest to be consecrated a Roman Catholic bishop.

== Early life ==
The sixth and last child of parents who were married in 1891, Snedden was born in Auckland on 15 December 1917. His primary education was at St Joseph's School, Te Aroha, and at St Mary's College, Auckland; his secondary education was at Sacred Heart College, Ponsonby. He began studying for the priesthood at Holy Cross College, Mosgiel, in 1934. In 1937 he was sent to Rome to study at the Pontifical Urbaniana University. Snedden was ordained a priest for the Auckland Diocese in Rome on 24 February 1941.

== War-time Rome ==
He was still studying in Rome in 1940 when Italy declared war on France and the UK, and while offered the opportunity to return to New Zealand, he, and his great friend Fr. John Flanagan (another Auckland priest in the same situation as Snedden), elected to remain in Rome. After his ordination he completed his doctorate in theology with a thesis on Saint John Fisher. At the same time Snedden and Flanagan became announcers for Vatican Radio, engaged particularly to broadcast weekly lists of Australian and New Zealand prisoners of war. Although the priests were not identified, one frequent listener to the broadcasts concluded that the readers must be New Zealanders because Māori names were pronounced with "such clarity and precision". Unofficially, code-named "Horace", Snedden, along with Flanagan (code-named "Fanny"), also became involved with an underground movement led by an Irish priest in the Vatican Secretariat of State, Hugh O'Flaherty, finding safe houses, medicines and food supplies for escaped prisoners of war who were hiding in the environs of Rome.

In mid-1943 (after the fall of Mussolini and the German occupation of Rome) such activities became much more hazardous under Gestapo surveillance and also risked compromising the neutrality of Vatican City. When the Allies liberated Rome in June 1944 the exploits of the priests became known and in 1945 both were decorated MBE by King George VI.

As New Zealand servicemen and women found their way to the city the two acted as guides and on occasions helped visitors arrange audiences with Pope Pius XII. Among these notables were Prime Minister Peter Fraser and Lieutenant-General Bernard Freyberg, then commanding the New Zealand Division. The latter commissioned them as military chaplains and they were repatriated on a troop ship early in 1945 before the end of WWII in Europe.

== Editor ==
In Auckland, Snedden was appointed to the staff of St Patrick's Cathedral and became assistant to Peter McKeefry, editor of Zealandia. In 1948, on the appointment of McKeefry as Archbishop of Wellington, Snedden took over the role of editor and held the position for 14 years until he too was transferred to Wellington. In Auckland he also fulfilled the function of commentator accompanying the radio broadcasts of Catholic liturgical events.

== Bishop and the Council ==
On 23 May 1962, Snedden was appointed Auxiliary Bishop of Wellington and Titular Bishop of Achelous. He was consecrated on 22 August 1962 by Archbishops McKeefry and Liston and Bishop Delargey. Snedden attended the final three sessions of Vatican II Council beginning with the second session which commenced on 29 September 1963. He was quite moved by his initial experience of the council, lining up as one of such a large gathering of bishops representing a universal church. The "Italian phrase molto comosso [profoundly affected] was the only way he could sum up his feelings".

During the session Snedden was appointed to a committee planning common liturgical texts for all the English-speaking world. This continued in the subsequent council sessions and eventually he was appointed to the International Commission on English in the Liturgy. After the council in the late 1960s and into the 1970s Snedden, with the help of Dom Joachim Murphy, the Abbot of the Trappist Southern Star Abbey at Kopua, and his team of priests, painstakingly criticised and commented on draft English translations of various liturgical books as they were translated from Latin into English.

== Wellington ==
Cardinal McKeefry died on 18 November 1973. Snedden, who took over the administration of the Archdiocese as Vicar Capitular, preached the panagyric at McKeefry's funeral. "Snedden would have been a popular replacement, but during his eleven years as auxiliary bishop he had experienced indifferent health" and he excluded himself from appointment (as he also did later). Reginald Delargey was appointed Archbishop. On 28 October 1976, Snedden was appointed Bishop of the New Zealand Military Vicariate. He was also the Vicar Capitular administering the archdiocese after the death of Cardinal Delargey.

During this interregnum, in August 1978, Snedden signed the integration agreements for the first Catholic Schools in New Zealand (Cardinal McKeefry School, Wilton, and St Bernard's School, Brooklyn – both in the Wellington Archdiocese), to be integrated into the State education system under the Private Schools Conditional Integration Act 1975. On the death of Cardinal Delargey, Thomas Stafford Williams was appointed as Archbishop. Snedden was Thomas William's principal Consecrator and the Co-Consecrators were Bishop Kavanagh and Archbishop Mataca of Suva.

== Death ==
Snedden died on Good Friday, 17 April 1981, aged 63. His Requiem Mass on 22 April 1981 was celebrated in St Mary of the Angels, Wellington, by Bishop Cullinane and the panegyric was preached by Bishop Mackey of Auckland.

== Notes ==
Catholic Church titles
Preceded by –	Auxiliary Bishop of Wellington; 1962–1981	Succeeded by –
