= William Rosbotham =

Northern Irish international lawn bowler

Personal information
- Nationality: Northern Irish
- Born: 1909

Sport
- Sport: Lawn bowls
- Club: Lisnagarvey BC
Medal record
Representing (Northern Ireland)
Commonwealth Games
Gold medal – first place	1954 Vancouver	pairs

William John Greer Rosbotham (1909 - date of death unknown), was a Northern Ireland international lawn bowler.

== Biography ==
Rosbotham was a civil servant by trade and lived at Loughall House in Loughgall, County Armagh.

He represented the 1954 Northern Irish team and won a gold medal in the pairs event at the 1954 British Empire and Commonwealth Games in Vancouver, with Percy Watson. After the games he was given a civic reception by the Lord and Mayor and Lady Mayoress at the Belfast City Hall.

He was the 1973 Northern Ireland singles champion.
