= Stanley Snedden =

NZ Lawn Bowls player (1902-1980)

Personal information
- Birth name: Stanley James Snedden
- Born: 23 September 1902; New Zealand
- Died: 30 April 1980 (aged 77); New Zealand
- Spouse: Hazel Mary Elizabeth Nixon (m. 1926)
- Relative(s): Cyril Snedden (cousin); Nessie Snedden (cousin); Owen Snedden (cousin)

Sport
- Country: New Zealand
- Sport: Lawn bowls
- Club: Linwood

Achievements and titles
- National finals: Men's fours champion (1938); Men's singles champion (1960)

Stanley James Snedden (23 September 1902 – 30 April 1980) was a New Zealand lawn bowls player.

== Bowls career ==
Snedden represented New Zealand at the 1958 British Empire and Commonwealth Games in Cardiff, finishing 10th in the men's fours, alongside Robin Andrew, Jeff Barron, and Bill Hampton.

In 1938, Snedden won the fours title at the New Zealand National Bowls Championships, representing the Linwood club. Twenty-two years later, in 1960, he won the national singles title, also representing Linwood.
