= Raoul da Luz =

Hong Kong lawn bowler

Personal information
- Nationality: Hong Kong; United States
- Born: 20 September 1892 Hong Kong
- Died: 4 May 1988 (aged 95) California, United States
Medal record
Representing (Hong Kong)
Commonwealth Games
Silver medal – second place	1954 Vancouver	fours

Raoul Francisco Eustaquio da Luz was a Hong Kong international lawn bowler. Of Portuguese origin he was born in Hong Kong and became a US citizen in 1965.

He won a silver medal in the fours at the 1954 British Empire and Commonwealth Games in Vancouver, with Alfred Coates, Robert Gourlay and his brother Jose da Luz. He also competed in the 1958 British Empire and Commonwealth Games in Cardiff, Wales.
