= Robin Andrew (footballer) =

Australian rules footballer

Personal information
- Born: 19 May 1945 (age 81)
- Original team: Murrumbeena
- Height: 188 cm (6 ft 2 in)
- Weight: 82.5 kg (182 lb)

Playing career^{1}
| Years | Club | Games (Goals) |
| 1965 | Melbourne | 1 (1) |
- ^{1} Playing statistics correct to the end of 1965.

Robin Andrew (born 19 May 1945) is a former Australian rules footballer who played with Melbourne in the Victorian Football League (VFL).
