= Denise O'Brien =

Australian fencer (1937–2024)

Personal information
- Full name: Denise Antonia O'Brien
- Born: 25 July 1937
- Died: 26 September 2024 (aged 87)

Sport
- Sport: Fencing

Denise Antonia O'Brien after marriage Wild (25 July 1937 – 26 September 2024) was an Australian fencer.

O'Brien was together with Barbara McCreath the earliest Australian female pioneers in women's fencing.

She competed in the women's individual foil event at the 1956 Summer Olympics.

With some government resources she also competed at the fencing competitions at the 1958 British Empire and Commonwealth Games. She finished sixth in the foil event.

She married Canadian basketball player Ed Wild. Wild died on 26 September 2024, at the age of 87.
