= Robert Laing (bowls) =

Scottish lawn bowler

Personal information
- Nationality: British (Scottish)
- Born: 1888 Scotland
- Died: 9 November 1966 (aged 77–78) Capetown, South Africa

Sport
- Sport: Lawn bowls
- Club: Crieff Bowls Club

Robert Peters Laing (1888 – 9 November 1966), was a Scottish international lawn bowler who competed at the British Empire and Commonwealth Games (now Commonwealth Games).

== Biography ==
Laing was a proprietor of a laundry and cleaning works in Alloa. He retired in 1952 and resided at 12 Dollerie Crescent in Crieff and was a member of the Crieff Bowls Club.

He represented the Scottish team at the 1954 British Empire and Commonwealth Games in Vancouver, Canada, where he participated in the singles event and finished in eighth place.

In 1950 Laing was the president of the Scottish Bowling Association and the Gymnastic Association. He was also the president of the Alloa Gymnastic Club for 25 years.

After the 1954 Games, he continued to visit relations in Canada and wrote articles for the local press.

In 1966, he died while travelling in South Africa and lived at Lochview Avenue in Gourock at the time.
