= Alfred Coates =

Personal information
- Nationality: Hong Kong
Medal record
Representing (Hong Kong)
Commonwealth Games
Silver medal – second place	1954 Vancouver	fours

Alfred E Coates is a former Hong Kong international lawn bowler.

He won a silver medal in the fours at the 1954 British Empire and Commonwealth Games in Vancouver, with Robert Gourlay and brothers Raoul da Luz and Jose da Luz.

He also competed in the 1958 British Empire and Commonwealth Games in Cardiff, Wales.
