= Scotland at the 1954 British Empire and Commonwealth Games =

- CGF code: SCO
- CGA: Scotland at the Commonwealth Games
- Website: www.teamscotland.scot

in Vancouver, Canada
- Medals Ranked 6th: Gold 6 Silver 2 Bronze 5 Total 13

British Empire and Commonwealth Games appearances
- 1930; 1934; 1938; 1950; 1954; 1958; 1962; 1966; 1970; 1974; 1978; 1982; 1986; 1990; 1994; 1998; 2002; 2006; 2010; 2014; 2018; 2022; 2026; 2030

Scotland at the 1954 British Empire and Commonwealth Games (abbreviated SCO) was the fifth time that the nation had participated at the Games following the appearances in 1930, 1934, 1938 and 1950.

The Games were held in Vancouver, Canada, from 30 July to 7 August 1954. Scotland came sixth overall with six gold, two silver and five bronze medals.

£8,000 was raised in order to send a team.

== Medals ==
=== Gold ===
- Dick Currie (boxing)
- Elenor Gordon (swimming)
- Peter Heatly (diving)
- Joe McGhee (athletics)
- John Smillie (boxing)
- women's 3×110 yd medley relay team (swimming)

=== Silver ===
- Frank McQuillan (boxing)
- Jack Wardrop (swimming)

=== Bronze ===
- Ewan Douglas (athletics)
- Margaret Girvan (swimming)
- Peter Heatly (diving)
- Men's pairs team (lawn bowls)
- men's 3×110 yd medley relay team (swimming)

== Team ==
=== Athletics ===
Men

Athlete	Events	Club	Medals
Ian Binnie	3/6 miles	Victoria Park AAC, Glasgow	
Ewan Douglas	Hammer throw, discus throw	Field Events Club, Edinburgh	Bronze medal
Jim Hamilton	880 yards	Victoria Park AAC, Glasgow	
Joe McGhee	Marathon	Shettleston Harriers	Gold medal
Alec Valentine	Hammer throw	Royal Navy	

Women

Athlete	Events	Notes	Medals
Patricia Devine	100y/220y, long jump	"Q" Club, Dundee	

=== Boxing ===
Athlete	Events	Club	Medals
Dick Currie	Flyweight 51kg	Dalmarnock ABC	Gold medal
Frank McQuillan	Lightweight 60kg	Dundee ABC	Silver medal
John Smillie	Bantamweight 54kg	Fauldhouse BC	Gold medal

=== Cycling ===
Athlete	Events	Club	Medals
Ronnie Park	Road Race, scratch, 4000 Pursuit	Velo Club Stella Glasgow	

=== Diving ===
Athlete	Events	Club	Medals
Peter Heatly	platform, springboard	Portobello	,

=== Lawn bowls ===
Athlete	Events	Club	Medals
George Budge	pairs, fours/rinks	Dalry BC	Bronze medal
John Carswell	pairs, fours/rinks	Dalbeattie BC	Bronze medal
Robert Laing	singles	Crieff BC	
Finlay McIver	fours/rinks	Inverness BC	
Herbert Morton	fours/rinks	Lugar Works Bowling and Social Club	

=== Swimming ===
Men

Athlete	Events	Club	Medals
John Service	220y breaststroke, medley relay	Western B.C	Bronze medal
Jack Wardrop	440y freestyle, medley relay	Motherwell SC	,
Bert Wardrop	110y backstroke, 440y freestyle, medley relay	Motherwell SC	Bronze medal

Women

Athlete	Events	Club	Medals
Margaret Girvan	110y freestyle, 440y freestyle, medley relay	Motherwell	,
Elenor Gordon	220y breaststroke, medley relay	Hamilton	,
Margaret McDowall	110y backstroke, medley relay	Kilmarnock SC	Gold medal

=== Weightlifting ===
Athlete	Events	Club	Medals
Jim McIntosh	Lightweight 67.5kg	Troon, Ayr	
Phil Caira	Light-heavyweight 82.5kg	Murray School of Physical Culture, Kirkcaldy	

=== Wrestling ===
Athlete	Events	Club	Medals
John Allison	Welterweight 74kg	L.M.S. Rovers Club, Glasgow	
George Farquhar	Middleweight 82kg	Milton AWC, Edinburgh	
George McKenzie	Lightweight 68kg	Leith AWC, Edinburgh	

== See also ==
- Scotland at the Commonwealth Games
