= Bill Hampton =

New Zealand lawn bowls player

Personal information
- Birth name: William Herbert Hampton
- Born: 6 September 1903; Christchurch, New Zealand
- Died: 5 April 1989 (aged 85); Levin, New Zealand
- Spouse: Constance Irene Callanan (m. 1929)

Sport
- Country: New Zealand
- Sport: Lawn bowls

William Herbert Hampton (6 September 1903 – 5 April 1989) was a New Zealand lawn bowls player.

Born in Christchurch in 1903, Hampton was the son of William John Hampton and Kathleen Mary Hampton (née Harper). On 25 February 1929, he married Constance Irene Callanan at the Roman Catholic Church in Geraldine, and the couple went on to have four children. A schoolteacher, Hampton rose to become principal of Naenae Intermediate School in the Hutt Valley.

At the 1958 British Empire and Commonwealth Games in Cardiff, Hampton represented New Zealand in the men's fours, alongside Robin Andrew, Stanley Snedden, and Jeff Barron, finishing in 10th place.

Hampton died in Levin on 5 April 1989.
