= Jennifer Thompson (athlete) =

New Zealand discus thrower

Medal record

Women's athletics

Representing New Zealand

Commonwealth Games
Silver medal – second place	1958 Cardiff	Discus

Jennifer Thompson (born 30 March 1938) is a former New Zealand discus thrower.

At the 1958 British Empire and Commonwealth Games she won the silver medal in the women's discus throw.

She also competed at the 1960 Olympic Games in the discus where she placed 13th overall.
