= Malcolm Hahn =

New Zealand javelin thrower

Malcolm Arthur Hahn QSM (3 May 1931 – 2 April 2010) was a New Zealand athlete and javelin thrower.

At the 1958 British Empire and Commonwealth Games in Cardiff, Wales he was the New Zealand flagbearer at the opening ceremony. In the javelin competition he finished 13th with a throw of 204’ 9½” (62.42 m).

Hahn's best throw was 71.52 metres (234 ft 8 in). This was a New Zealand record at the time and the first throw by a New Zealander over 70 metres (229 ft 8 in).

Malcolm Arthur Hahn ( 1931 - 2010 ) was the great great grandson of Ludwig Johan Hahn (1820 - 1899) Born in Memel, Lithuania.
