= Tom Stewart (bowls) =

British lawn bowler (1884–1960)

Thomas Stewart
Personal information
- Nationality: British (English)
- Born: 31 May 1884 Buckinghamshire, England
- Died: 7 December 1960 (aged 76) Berkshire, England
- Occupation: Pharmacist

Sport
- Sport: Lawn bowls
- Club: Bracknell BC

Thomas George Stewart (31 May 1884 – 7 December 1960), was an English bowls player who competed at the Commonwealth Games.

== Biography ==
Stewart began playing bowls for Bracknell Bowls Club in 1915 and the Berkshire County Association from 1922. He became captain of the Berkshire BC in March 1923 and by 1933 was the honorary secretary of the club.

He was selected for the British team for the 1954 tour of Canada, which included the 1954 British Empire and Commonwealth Games. He participated in the 1954 British Empire and Commonwealth Games at Vancouver, British Columbia, in the pairs event with Edward Bateman and finished 10th.

At the time of the Games he was a Pharmacist by trade and lived at Roebuck Cottage in Binfield, Berkshire and by the end of the 1954 tour had taken part in 24 matches for Britain and England.
