= Jeff Barron =

New Zealand lawn bowls player

Personal information
- Birth name: Thomas William Jeffray Barron
- Born: 16 February 1908; New Zealand
- Died: 29 September 1966 (aged 58); New Zealand
- Spouse: Eileen Mary Keeble (m. 1932)

Sport
- Country: New Zealand
- Sport: Lawn bowls
- Club: Miramar Bowling Club

Achievements and titles
- National finals: Men's singles champion (1962)

Thomas William Jeffray Barron (16 February 1908 – 29 September 1966) was a New Zealand lawn bowls player who represented his country at two British Empire and Commonwealth Games, in 1958 and 1962.

Barron was born on 16 February 1908, the son of Thomas and Ethel Jane Barron. On 10 August 1932, he married Eileen Mary Keeble at St Paul's Church, Wellington.

At the 1958 British Empire and Commonwealth Games in Cardiff, Barron represented New Zealand in the men's fours, alongside Robin Andrew, Stanley Snedden, and Bill Hampton, finishing in 10th place. He placed sixth in the men's singles at the 1962 British Empire and Commonwealth Games in Perth.

In 1962, Barron won the New Zealand National Bowls Championships singles title, representing the Miramar club.

Barron died on 29 September 1966, and his ashes were buried at Karori Cemetery.
