= Bill Jackson (bowls) =

Personal information
- Nationality: (Federation of Rhodesia and Nyasaland) Rhodesia and Nyasaland
- Born: 19 October 1915 Cape Town, South Africa

Sport
- Club: Avondale Sport Club, Salisbury
Medal record
Representing Southern Rhodesia
Commonwealth Games
Bronze medal – third place	1958 Cardiff	singles
Representing Rhodesia and Nyasaland
Commonwealth Games
Bronze medal – third place	1962 Perth	pairs

William J. R. Jackson (born 19 October 1915) is a former Rhodesian international lawn bowler.

Jackson won two bronze medals at the Commonwealth Games; a singles bronze at the 1958 British Empire and Commonwealth Games in Cardiff and a pairs bronze at the 1962 British Empire and Commonwealth Games in Perth.
