= John Morris (bowls) =

New Zealand lawn bowls player

Medal record

Men's lawn bowls

Representing New Zealand

British Empire and Commonwealth Games
Gold medal – first place	1958 Cardiff	Pairs

John Morris is a former lawn bowls competitor for New Zealand.

At the 1958 British Empire and Commonwealth Games in Cardiff he won the men's pairs gold medal partnering Ted Pilkington.
