= John Carswell (bowls) =

Scottish international lawn bowler

Personal information
- Nationality: British (Scottish)
- Born: 1887 Dalbeattie, Scotland
- Died: 2 November 1966 (aged 79) Fife, Scotland

Sport
- Sport: Lawn bowls
- Club: Dalbeattie Bowling Club
Medal record
Representing (Scotland)
Commonwealth Games
Bronze medal – third place	1954 Vancouver	pairs

John Whitfield-Jackson Carswell (1887 – 2 November 1966), was a Scottish international lawn bowler.

== Biography ==
Carswell was born in Dalbeattie and lived at Barcairn in Barhill Road. He was a grain merchant by trade and a member of the Dalbeattie Bowling Club.

Carswell represented the Scottish team at the 1954 British Empire and Commonwealth Games in Vancouver, Canada and won a bronze medal in the pairs with George Budge.
