= Stanley Lee (bowls) =

British lawn bowler (1899–1986)

Personal information
- Nationality: British (English)
- Born: 17 October 1899 Hitchin, England
- Died: 1986 (aged 86–87) Hitchin, England
- Occupation: Electrical Engineer

Sport
- Sport: Lawn bowls

Stanley Lee (17 October 1899–1986), was an English bowls player who competed at the Commonwealth Games.

== Bowls career ==
He participated in the 1954 British Empire and Commonwealth Games at Vancouver, British Columbia, Canada in the singles and the fours/rinks events and finishing in 8th and 10th place respectively.

== Personal life ==
He was an electrical engineer by trade and lived at Devon Villa on Fishponds Road in Hitchin.
