= Ted Pilkington =

New Zealand lawn bowls player

Personal information
- Born: Richard Edwin Pilkington; 2 August 1908 Waihi, New Zealand
- Died: 21 February 1994 (aged 85) Christchurch, New Zealand
- Occupation: Schoolteacher
- Spouse: Edith Quinlan (m. 1935; died 1990)

Sport
- Country: New Zealand
- Sport: Lawn bowls
- Club: Balmoral Bowling Club; Elmwood Bowling Club

Achievements and titles
- National finals: Men's pairs champion (1953)
Medal record
Men's lawn bowls
Representing New Zealand
British Empire and Commonwealth Games
Gold medal – first place	1958 Cardiff	Pairs

Richard Edwin Pilkington (2 August 1908 – 21 February 1994) was a New Zealand lawn bowls player. He represented his country at two British Empire and Commonwealth Games, winning the gold medal in the men's pairs at the 1958 British Empire and Commonwealth Games.

== Early life and family ==
Born in Waihi on 2 August 1908, Pilkington was the son of Martha and Richard Nathaniel Pilkington. He qualified as a schoolteacher in 1927.

On 2 January 1935, Pilkington married Edith Margaret Quinlan at the Church of Our Lady of the Sacred Heart in Otorohanga, and the couple went on to have two children.

== Bowls career ==
In 1953, Pilkington (skip), partnered with Jack Benson, won the men's pairs title at the New Zealand championships in Auckland, representing the Balmoral Bowling Club. Pilkington's father had won the same title in 1931 and 1935. Also at the 1953 national championships, Pilkington finished third in the men's singles.

At the 1958 British Empire and Commonwealth Games in Cardiff, Pilkington won the men's pairs gold medal alongside John Morris. He competed at the 1962 British Empire and Commonwealth Games as part of the men's fours team that placed sixth overall.

Pilkington continued his involvement in lawn bowls as a player, and also later was the Auckland regional coach.

== Teaching career ==
Pilkington was appointed specialist assistant at Otorohanga District High School in 1931. He remained there until 1940, when he became sole teacher at Maraetai School. In 1945, he was appointed head teacher at Matarau School, and in 1949 he moved to Ohaeawai School, where he was also head teacher. He later taught in Wellsford.

== Later life ==
Pilkington moved to Christchurch from Auckland in 1983, and joined the Elmwood Bowling Club. He died in Christchurch on 21 February 1994, at the age of 85, having been predeceased by his wife, Edith Pilkington, in 1990.
