= Robin Andrew (bowls) =

New Zealand lawn bowls player

Personal information
- Birth name: Robin James Andrew
- Born: 6 October 1912; New Zealand
- Died: 25 August 1985 (aged 72); New Zealand
- Spouse: Jean Ellen Grant (m. 1936)

Sport
- Country: New Zealand
- Sport: Lawn bowls

Achievements and titles
- National finals: Men's singles champion (1954)

Robin James Andrew (6 October 1912 – 25 August 1985) was a New Zealand lawn bowls player.

Andrew represented New Zealand at the 1958 British Empire and Commonwealth Games in Cardiff, finishing 10th in the men's fours, alongside Stanley Snedden, Jeff Barron, and Bill Hampton.

In 1954, Andrew won the singles title at the New Zealand lawn bowls championships, representing the Onehunga club.
