= George Budge =

Scottish lawn bowler

Personal information
- Nationality: British (Scottish)
- Born: 9 May 1884 Dumbarton, Scotland
- Died: 29 July 1962 (aged 78) Ayrshire, Scotland

Sport
- Sport: Lawn bowls
- Club: Dalry Bowls Club
Medal record
Representing (Scotland)
Commonwealth Games
Bronze medal – third place	1954 Vancouver	pairs

George Burnet Budge (9 May 1884 - 29 July 1962), was a Scottish international lawn bowler.

== Biography ==
Budge was a cinema company director by trade and lived in James Street, Dalry, North Ayrshire and was a member of the Dalry Bowls Club.

Budge represented the Scottish team at the 1954 British Empire and Commonwealth Games in Vancouver, Canada, where he won a bronze medal in the pairs event with John Carswell.
