= Wilfred Randall =

Lawn bowler

Personal information
- Nationality: South Africa
- Born: September 17, 1914

Sport
- Sport: lawn bowls
- Club: Kensington BC
Medal record
Representing (South Africa)
Commonwealth Games
Gold medal – first place	1954 Vancouver	fours
Silver medal – second place	1958 Cardiff	fours

Wilfred A Randall (1914 – date of death unknown), was a South African international lawn bowler.

== Bowls career ==
He won a gold medal in the fours at the 1954 British Empire and Commonwealth Games in Vancouver, with Frank Mitchell, George Wilson and John Anderson.

Four years late he won a silver medal in the fours at the 1958 British Empire and Commonwealth Games in Cardiff, with Norman Snowy Walker, Edward Williams and Edward Stuart.

He won the 1951 rinks at the National Championships, bowling for the Kensington Bowls Club.

== Personal life ==
He was an engineer foreman by trade.
