= Alan Bradley (bowls) =

Personal information
- Nationality: (Federation of Rhodesia and Nyasaland) Rhodesia and Nyasaland
- Born: 1926
Medal record
Representing Southern Rhodesia
Commonwealth Games
Bronze medal – third place	1954 Vancouver	fours
Representing Rhodesia and Nyasaland
Commonwealth Games
Bronze medal – third place	1962 Perth	singles

Alan D. Bradley (born 1926) is a former international lawn bowler who competed for Rhodesia.

== Bowls career ==
Bradley won two bronze medals in the fours and singles competitions at the Commonwealth Games. They came in the 1954 British Empire and Commonwealth Games in Vancouver and the 1962 British Empire and Commonwealth Games in Perth.

== Personal life ==
His father Charles 'Stewart' Bradley was a Rhodesian international lawn bowler and he was a civil engineer by trade.
