= Donald Gemmell =

New Zealand rower (1932–2022)

Personal information
- Nationality: New Zealand
- Born: Donald Leslie Gemmell; 27 December 1932 Wanganui, New Zealand
- Died: 22 June 2022 (aged 89) Wanganui, New Zealand

Donald Leslie Gemmell (27 December 1932 – 22 June 2022) was a New Zealand rower.

Gemmell was born in 1932 in Wanganui, New Zealand. He represented New Zealand at the 1956 Summer Olympics. He is listed as New Zealand Olympian athlete number 90 by the New Zealand Olympic Committee.
