= Ronnie Turner =

Rhodesian international lawn bowler

Personal information
- Nationality: (Federation of Rhodesia and Nyasaland) Rhodesia and Nyasaland
- Born: 1911 Cape Town, South Africa

Sport
- Club: Avondale Sport Club, Salisbury
Medal record
Representing Southern Rhodesia
Commonwealth Games
Bronze medal – third place	1954 Vancouver	fours
Bronze medal – third place	1958 Cardiff	fours
Representing Rhodesia and Nyasaland
Commonwealth Games
Bronze medal – third place	1962 Perth	fours

Ronald H. Turner (born 1911, date of death unknown) was a Rhodesian international lawn bowler.

He won three bronze medals in the fours competition at consecutive Commonwealth Games. They came in the 1954 British Empire and Commonwealth Games in Vancouver, 1958 British Empire and Commonwealth Games in Cardiff and the 1962 British Empire and Commonwealth Games in Perth.
