= Deaths in January 1990 =

The following is a list of notable deaths in January 1990.

Entries for each day are listed alphabetically by surname. A typical entry lists information in the following sequence:

- Name, age, country of citizenship at birth, subsequent country of citizenship (if applicable), reason for notability, cause of death (if known), and reference.

== January 1990 ==
=== 1 ===
- Ingvald Bjerke, 82, Norwegian Olympic boxer (1928).
- Arundhati Devi, 66, Indian actress, director, and singer.
- Carmen Hill, 94, American baseball player.
- Joe Hardstaff Jr, 78, English cricketer.
- Patrick Kelly, 35, American fashion designer, AIDS.
- Ernst Kuzorra, 84, German football player and Olympian (1928).
- Raymond Petit, 79, French Olympic middle-distance runner (1936).
- Niyazi Sel, 81, Turkish Olympic footballer (1936).
- T. B. Simatupang, 69, Indonesian National Armed Forces chief of staff.
- Max Trepp, 65, Swiss Olympic sprinter (1948).
- James W. Wood, 65, American aeronautical engineer and astronaut.

=== 2 ===
- Lawrence Alloway, 63, English-American art critic, cardiac arrest.
- Evangelos Averoff, 79, Greek right wing politician and author, heart attack.
- Bill Beckmann, 82, American baseball player (Philadelphia Athletics, St. Louis Cardinals).
- Dally Duncan, 80, Scottish footballer.
- Alan Hale, Jr., 68, American actor (Gilligan's Island, Hang 'Em High, Casey Jones), thymus cancer.
- Leonhard Merzin, 55, Soviet actor.
- Reginald Paget, Baron Paget of Northampton, 81, British politician.
- T. R. Raghunath, 77, Indian film director.
- Ben Reifel, 83, American politician, member of the U.S. House of Representatives (1961–1971), cancer.
- Marianne C. Sharp, 88, American Mormon charity activist.
- Philippe Tisson, 86, French Olympic swimmer (1928).
- Vladimir Ussachevsky, 78, Soviet-American composer.

=== 3 ===
- Loraine Boettner, 88, American theologian.
- Mauro Cía, 70, Argentine Olympic boxer (1948), and actor.
- Roy Ilowit, 72, American football player and coach.
- Reuben Jones, 57, British equestrian rider and Olympian (1964, 1968).
- Joseph A. Loftus, 82, American journalist, stroke.
- Peter van Steeden, 85, Dutch-American composer.
- William Wells, 81, English politician.
- Bandara Wijethunga, 50, Sri Lankan writer.

=== 4 ===
- Robert Adams, 56, American science fiction and fantasy writer.
- Lydia Bilbrook, 101, English actress.
- Henry Bolte, 81, Australian politician, Premier of Victoria.
- Alberto Lleras Camargo, 83, Colombian politician, president (1958–1962).
- Ed Ecker, 66, American footballer player (Chicago Bears, Green Bay Packers, Washington Redskins).
- Doc Edgerton, 86, American electrical engineer and academic.
- George Gearry, 66, New Zealand cricketer.
- Bonnie Hollingsworth, 94, American baseball player.
- Edmund Hood, 91, Australian rules footballer.
- Florrinell F. Morton, 85, American librarian.
- Boris Nikolsky, 89, Soviet chemist.
- Per Samuelshaug, 84, Norwegian Olympic cross-country skier (1936).
- Olaf Ussing, 82, Danish actor.
- Wim Volkers, 90, Dutch football player.
- Alfred Michael Watson, 81, American Roman Catholic prelate.

=== 5 ===
- Bobby Balcena, 64, American MLB player (Cincinnati Redlegs).
- Alan Handley, 77, American television producer, heart attack.
- Dick Hart, 69, British painter.
- Lola Iturbe, 87, Spanish trade unionist, activist, and journalist.
- Arthur Kennedy, 75, American actor (Bright Victory, Peyton Place, Lawrence of Arabia), Tony winner (1949), brain cancer.
- Bartell LaRue, 57, American actor.
- Kléber Piot, 69, French racing cyclist.
- Robert G. Rayburn, 74, American academic and theologian, cancer.
- Jaroslav Rössler, 87, Czech photographer.
- Thomas Schuster, 52, Fijian Olympic boxer (1956).
- Genrikh Sidorenkov, 58, Soviet Russian Olympic ice hockey player (1956, 1960).

=== 6 ===
- Gordon Aitchison, 80, Canadian Olympic basketball player (1936).
- Walter Anderson, 92, American baseball player (Philadelphia Athletics).
- Tadashi Asai, 54, Japanese wrestler and Olympian (1956, 1960).
- Ian Charleson, 40, Scottish actor (Chariots of Fire, Gandhi, Greystoke: The Legend of Tarzan, Lord of the Apes), AIDS.
- Pavel Cherenkov, 85, Soviet physicist, Nobel Prize recipient (1958).
- Peter Cookson, 76, American actor, bone cancer.
- Hans Jaray, 83, Austrian actor and playwright.
- Wally Kelly, 75, Australian rules footballer.
- Gerald Mann, 82, American football player.
- Sophie Piccard, 85, Russian-Swiss mathematician.
- Robin Schofield, 50, New Zealand cricketer.
- William Smith, 89, English cricketer.
- Jake Weber, 71, American basketball player (New York Knicks).

=== 7 ===
- Tadeusz Brzeziński, 93, Polish-Canadian diplomat, pneumonia.
- Eero Böök, 79, Finnish chess player.
- Edward Ennis, 82, American civil rights lawyer, diabetes.
- Gerald Gardiner, Baron Gardiner, 89, British politician.
- Rose Kushner, 60, American journalist, breast cancer.
- Avraham Abba Leifer, 71, Romanian-American-Israeli rabbi.
- Bronko Nagurski, 81, Canadian-American Hall of Fame football player (Chicago Bears), cardiac arrest.
- Joe Robbie, 73, American politician and football executive.
- Harry L. Shapiro, 87, American anthropologist.
- Napua Stevens, 71, American entertainer.
- Horace Stoneham, 86, American baseball executive.
- Shag Thompson, 96, American baseball player (Philadelphia Athletics).
- Johanna Töpfer, 60, German politician, suicide.

=== 8 ===
- Georgie Auld, 70, American musician, lung cancer.
- Mario Brignoli, 87, Italian Olympic racewalker (1936).
- Prince Joseph Clemens of Bavaria, 87, German royal and art historian.
- Leo Connors, 71, Australian rules footballer.
- Jaime Gil de Biedma, 60, Spanish poet, AIDS.
- Paul A. Kennon, 55, American architect, heart attack.
- Bernard Krigstein, 70, American artist.
- Raymond Krug, 65, French Olympic footballer (1948).
- Muni Lal, 76, Indian cricketer.
- Fred McDaniel, 76, American baseball player.
- Adam Michel, 53, Polish footballer.
- John Schick, 74, American basketball player.
- August Sturm, 77, Austrian Olympic gymnast (1936).
- Johnny Sylvester, 74, American businessman.
- Terry-Thomas, 78, English comedian and actor (It's a Mad, Mad, Mad, Mad World, Robin Hood, Bachelor Flat), Parkinson's disease.

=== 9 ===
- Paul Bauer, 93, German poet.
- Roger Bower, 86, British soldier.
- Northern Calloway, 41, American actor (Sesame Street), beaten, cardiovascular disease.
- Spud Chandler, 82, American baseball player (New York Yankees).
- Rosemarie Clausen, 82, German photographer.
- Jim Gillette, 72, American football player (Cleveland Rams, Green Bay Packers, Detroit Lions).
- Rufus Mayes, 42, American football player (Chicago Bears, Cincinnati Bengals, Philadelphia Eagles), bacterial meningitis.
- Edward McTiernan, 97, Australian politician and judge.
- Maston E. O'Neal, Jr., 82, American politician, member of the U.S. House of Representatives (1965–1971).
- Bazilio Olara-Okello, 60-61, Ugandan soldier and politician, president (1985).
- Shlomo Pines, 81, French-Israeli theologian.
- Robert B. Pirie, 84, American naval admiral.
- Cemal Süreya, 58-59, Turkish poet, diabetes.

=== 10 ===
- Jenny Addams, 80, Belgian Olympic fencer (1928, 1932, 1936, 1948).
- John Benham, 89, British Olympic athlete (1924).
- Juliet Berto, 42, French actress, breast cancer.
- Mino Guerrini, 62, Italian film director.
- Tochinishiki Kiyotaka, 64, Japanese sumo wrestler, stroke.
- Gene Phillips, 74, American musician.
- Liesel Schuch, 98, German singer.
- Otto Weidinger, 75, German nazi SS-obersturmbannführer during World War II.
- Lyle R. Wheeler, 84, American art director (Gone with the Wind, The Diary of Anne Frank, Rebecca), five-time Oscar winner, pneumonia.
- Herbert Williams, 81, American sailor and Olympic champion (1956).

=== 11 ===
- Carolyn Haywood, 92, American children's writer and illustrator.
- Earl D. Johnson, 84, United States Under Secretary of the Army.
- Mario Minatelli, 64, Italian Olympic boxer (1948).
- Ihsan Abdel Quddous, 71, Egyptian journalist, novelist and short-story writer, stroke.
- Kittens Reichert, 79, American actress.
- José Luis García Traid, 53, Spanish footballer, complications during surgery.

=== 12 ===
- Joseph Campisi, boss of the Dallas mafia.
- Joseph Sill Clark Jr., 88, American politician, member of the U.S. Senate (1957–1969).
- Whitey Dienelt, 68, American basketball player.
- John Hansen, 65, Danish footballer and Olympian (1948).
- Ralph Heikkinen, 72, American football player.
- Laurence J. Peter, 70, Canadian-American educator, stroke.
- Paul Pisk, 96, Austrian-American composer.

=== 13 ===
- Gaston Crunelle, 91, French flautist.
- Francisco Hormazábal, 69, Chilean football player and manager.
- Madhavsinh Jagdale, 75, Indian cricketer.
- Roy Jarvis, 63, American baseball player (Brooklyn Dodgers, Pittsburgh Pirates).
- Jenő Kalmár, 81, Hungarian footballer.
- Richard Liebscher, 79, German Olympic fencer (1952).
- Stuart McVicar, 71, New Zealand cricketer.
- Sir Dermot Milman, 8th Baronet, 77, English cricketer.
- Avraham Ofek, 54, Bulgarian-Israeli artist.
- Pierre Pascal, 80, French poet and translator.
- Gerhard Sturmberger, 49, Austrian football player.
- Peter Tippett, 63, Australian rules footballer.

=== 14 ===
- Edgar Douglas Richmond Bissett, 99, Canadian politician, member of the House of Commons of Canada (1926-1930).
- Ruth Bunzel, 91, American anthropologist.
- Sten-Åke Cederhök, 76, Swedish actor.
- Sabri Dino, 48, Turkish footballer, suicide.
- India Edwards, 94, American journalist.
- Ken Kilrea, 70, Canadian ice hockey player (Detroit Red Wings).
- Rosalind Pitt-Rivers, 82, British biochemist.
- Anno Smith, 74, Dutch artist.
- Walter Wenger, 78, Swiss Olympic wrestler (1948).
- James Arthur Williams, 59, American antiques dealer, heart failure.
- Tommy Williams, 80, Australian rules footballer.
- John Witty, 74, British film and television actor.

=== 15 ===
- Bill Albans, 64, American Olympic athlete (1948).
- Mani Madhava Chakyar, 90, Indian performance artist and sanskrit scholar.
- Brainard Cheney, 89, American writer.
- R. R. Diwakar, 95, Indian politician and writer.
- František Douda, 81, Czech Olympic shot putter (1928, 1932, 1936).
- Gordon Jackson, 66, Scottish actor (Upstairs, Downstairs, The Great Escape, The Ipcress File), bone cancer.
- Donold Lourie, 90, American businessman and football player.
- Lin McLean, 71, Australian rugby league player.
- Fred Mundee, 76, American football player (Chicago Bears).
- William O'Neal, 40, American FBI Black Panther Party informant, suicide by traffic collision.
- Sverre Østhagen, 71, Norwegian politician.
- Peggy van Praagh, 79, British-Australian ballet dancer and choreographer.

=== 16 ===
- Albert Bachmann, 83, Swiss gymnast and Olympian (1936).
- Lady Eve Balfour, 91, British farmer and organic farming pioneer.
- Bill Heaton, 71, English footballer.
- Clarence Janecek, 78, American gridiron football player (Pittsburgh Pirates).
- Gilbert Jessop, 83, English cricketer.
- Robert Lamartine, 54, French footballer.
- Earl Naylor, 70, American baseball player (Philadelphia Phillies, Brooklyn Dodgers).
- Jean Saint-Fort Paillard, 76, French Olympic equestrian (1948, 1952, 1956).
- Louis Serrurier, 84, South African cricketer.
- Ruskin Spear, 78, English painter.

=== 17 ===
- Andreas Aulie, 92, Norwegian jurist.
- Fritz Brocksieper, 77, German musician.
- Danie Burger, 56, South African Olympic hurdler (1956).
- Anna Arnold Hedgeman, 90, American civil rights activist.
- Charles Hernu, 66, French politician.
- André Morice, 89, French politician.
- Léon Motchane, 89, French mathematician.
- Simon Nicholson, 55, British artist.
- Inzer Bass Wyatt, 82, American district judge (United States District Court for the Southern District of New York).
- Y. C. James Yen, 96, Chinese educator and organizer, pneumonia.

=== 18 ===
- Harold Albiston, 73, Australian rules footballer.
- Melanie Appleby, 23, English singer, pneumonia.
- Kim Chang-Hee, 68, South Korean weightlifter and Olympic medalist (1948, 1952, 1956).
- Rusty Hamer, 42, American actor, suicide by gunshot.
- Edouard Izac, 98, American politician, member of the U.S. House of Representatives (1937–1947), heart failure.
- Candy Jones, 64, American model and broadcaster, cancer.
- Ivan Mackenzie Lamb, 78, British explorer and botanist, ALS.

=== 19 ===
- Carlo Bagno, 69, Italian actor.
- Pierre Barbizet, 67, French pianist.
- Viña Delmar, 86, American novelist, playwright, and screenwriter.
- Arthur Goldberg, 81, American judge and diplomat, heart failure.
- Movses Gorgisyan, 28, Soviet Armenian independence activist and soldier, killed in battle.
- Aldo Gucci, 84, Italian businessman (Gucci), prostate cancer.
- George Gulyanics, 68, American football player (Chicago Bears).
- Myles Horton, 84, American educator, brain tumor.
- Alexander Pechersky, 80, Soviet soldier and humanitarian.
- Rajneesh, 58, Indian mystic, heart failure.
- Alberto Semprini, 81, English pianist, Alzheimer's disease.
- Maharram Seyidov, 37, Soviet Azerbaijani soldier, killed in battle.
- Herbert Wehner, 83, German politician, diabetes.
- J. Ernest Wharton, 90, American politician, member of the U.S. House of Representatives (1951–1965).

=== 20 ===
- Jack Arkwright, 87, English rugby player.
- Claude Auclair, 46, French cartoonist.
- Robert Donington, 82, British musicologist.
- Hayedeh, 47, Iranian singer, heart attack
- Prince Naruhiko Higashikuni, 102, Japanese royal and politician, prime minister (1945), heart failure.
- Bror Kraemer, 89, Finnish Olympic high jumper (1924).
- Hugh Ross, 91, American choral director.
- Barbara Stanwyck, 82, American actress (Double Indemnity, Ball of Fire, The Big Valley), Emmy winner (1961, 1966, 1983), heart failure.
- Fernand Vandernotte, 87, French Olympic rower (1932, 1936).
- Aris Vatimbella, 73, Greek Olympic alpine skier (1956).
- Fred Venturelli, 72, American football player (Chicago Bears).

=== 21 ===
- Asbjørn Bryhn, 83, Norwegian police officer and resistance member during World War II.
- Frank Gervasi, 81, American writer and foreign correspondent, stroke.
- Trude Fleischmann, 94, Austrian-born American photographer.
- Rosa Gutiérrez, 70, Mexican Olympic diver (1948).
- Perce Horne, 99, Australian rugby league player.
- Patrick Mulligan, 77, Irish Roman Catholic prelate.
- Mark Sugden, 87, Irish rugby player.

=== 22 ===
- Gordon Buehrig, 85, American automobile designer.
- Giorgio Caproni, 78, Italian writer.
- Ernesto Crotti, 53, Italian Olympic ice hockey player (1956).
- James Dyson, 75, British physicist.
- Bill Ferrar, 96, English mathematician.
- Karl Frankenstein, 84, German-Israeli educator.
- Ezra Henniger, 62, Canadian Olympic middle-distance runner (1948).
- Maria Jacoby, 89, Luxembourgian painter.
- Helmut Krausnick, 84, German historian and writer.
- Art Laster, 41, American football player (Buffalo Bills).
- Gabriella Marchi, 33, Italian Olympic gymnast (1972).
- Bradley Ross, 26, Australian rules footballer.
- Mariano Rumor, 74, Italian politician, prime minister (1968–1970, 1973–1974), heart attack.
- José Salomón, 73, Argentine football player.
- Roman Vishniac, 92, Russian-German-American photographer, colon cancer.

=== 23 ===
- Buzz Boll, 78, Canadian ice hockey player (Toronto Maple Leafs, New York Americans, Boston Bruins).
- Clarence Bruce, 65, American baseball player.
- Allen Collins, 37, American musician (Lynyrd Skynyrd), pneumonia.
- Wilhelm Dommes, 82, German U-boat commander during World War II.
- Gerald Gibbs, 82, English cinematographer.
- Nikolaus Hofreiter, 85, Austrian mathematician.
- Charley Eugene Johns, 84, American politician, governor of Florida (1953–1955).
- Les Neal, 76, Australian rules footballer.
- Derek Royle, 61, British actor, cancer.
- Enrique Sieburger Jr., 65, Argentine Olympic sailor (1948, 1960).

=== 24 ===
- Madge Bellamy, 90, American actress, heart failure.
- John Blacking, 61, British anthropologist.
- Cyril Coote, 80, English cricketer.
- Helga Gnauer, 60, Austrian Olympic fencer (1960).
- Princess Teresa Cristina of Saxe-Coburg and Gotha-Koháry, 87, German royal.
- Gerry Johnson, 71, American actress and television host.
- Muhammad Juman, 54, Pakistani musician.
- Bohuslav Kirchmann, 87, Czech Olympic fencer (1936).
- Saadia Kobashi, 86, Yemenite Jewish community leader in Israel.
- Araken Patusca, 84, Brazilian footballer.
- Shantilal C. Sheth, 77, Indian pediatrician and academic.

=== 25 ===
- Dámaso Alonso, 91, Spanish poet and literary critic.
- Dan Corry, 87, Irish Olympic equestrian (1948).
- Ava Gardner, 67, American actress (Mogambo, The Night of the Iguana, The Killers), pneumonia.
- Edward C. Gleed, 73, American Air Force officer (Tuskegee Airmen).
- Miloš Hrazdíra, 44, Czech racing cyclist and Olympian (1972).
- Joseph Lennon, 56, Irish politician.
- Alexander Lockwood, 87, American actor.
- Georges Mantha, 82, Canadian ice hockey player (Montreal Canadiens).
- John L. McCrea, 98, American naval officer during World War I and World War II, pneumonia.
- Andy Puplis, 74, American football player (Chicago Cardinals).
- John Ramsey, 62, American sports announcer, heart attack.

=== 26 ===
- Dodo Abashidze, 65, Soviet actor and film director.
- George C. Carr, 60, American district judge (United States District Court for the Middle District of Florida).
- Hal Draper, 75, American socialist activist, pneumonia.
- Lewis Garnsworthy, 67-68, Canadian Anglican prelate.
- Bob Gerard, 76, English racing driver.
- Toninho Guerreiro, 47, Brazilian footballer, stroke.
- Miloslav Ištvan, 61, Czech composer.
- Borislav Kamenski, 78-79, Bulgarian footballer.
- Ned Miller, 90, American songwriter, composer, and actor.
- Lewis Mumford, 94, American historian.
- Philip Nichols, 82, American judge, heart attack.
- Boy Trip, 68, Dutch politician.

=== 27 ===
- Miklós Borsos, 83, Hungarian sculptor.
- Pit Corder, 71, British linguist.
- Helen Jerome Eddy, 92, American actress, heart failure.
- Stan Eve, 64, English cricketer.
- S. Charles Lee, 90, American architect.
- Steffen Thomas, 84, German-American artist and poet.
- Travis Webb, 79, American racing driver.
- Henry Winterfeld, 88, German-American writer.

=== 28 ===
- Joseph Payne Brennan, 71, American author and poet.
- Tibor Flórián, 70, Hungarian chess player.
- Nancy Gruver, 58, American bridge player.
- Puma Jones, 36, American singer, breast cancer.
- Jan Lambrichs, 74, Dutch racing cyclist.
- Alfred McCoy, 90, American gridiron football player.
- Chesley G. Peterson, 69, American Air Force officer and flying ace during World War II.
- Edward Ścigała, 63, Polish Olympic weightlifter (1952).
- Edward Szymkowiak, 57, Polish Olympic football player (1952, 1960).
- Casey Tibbs, 60, American cowboy and rodeo performer, bone cancer.
- F. W. Winterbotham, 92, British RAF officer and spy during World War II.

=== 29 ===
- Stan Batinski, 72, American football player (Detroit Lions, Boston Yanks).
- Elise Blumann, 93, German-Australian artist.
- Ted Bogan, 80, American country blues guitarist, singer, and songwriter.
- Irma Brandeis, 84, American scholar of Dante Alighieri.
- Arnaud d'Usseau, 73, American screenwriter, stomach cancer.
- Hadwen Carlton Fuller, 94, American politician, member of the U.S. House of Representatives (1943–1949).

=== 30 ===
- M. A. B. Beg, 55, Pakistani-American theoretical physicist.
- Severino Canavesi, 79, Italian racing cyclist.
- Bob Fosdick, 95, American football player.
- John Lindgren, 90, Swedish skier and Olympian (1932).
- João Uva de Matos Proença, 51, Portuguese diplomat.

=== 31 ===
- Muammer Aksoy, 73, Turkish academic.
- Lance Arnold, 63, Australian rules footballer.
- Ricardo Bordallo, 62, American politician and businessman, suicide.
- Sigmund Frogn, 85, Norwegian footballer.
- Homer Griffith, 77, American football player (Chicago Cardinals).
- Rashad Khalifa, 54, Egyptian-American biochemist, stabbed.
- Yitzhak Klinghoffer, 84, Austrian-Israeli politician.
- Eveline Du Bois-Reymond Marcus, 88, German-Brazilian zoologist.
- Ramon Olalkiaga, 91, Spanish footballer.
- Samuel C. Phillips, 68, American Air Force general, cancer.
- Hans Putz, 69, Austrian actor.
- Hazel Marguerite Schmoll, 99, American botanist.
- Dick Wilson, 55, American Oglala tribal chairman, kidney failure.
