= Weightlifting at the 1952 Summer Olympics – Men's 67.5 kg =

Weightlifting at the Olympics

Men's 67.5 kg at the Games of the XV Olympiad
- Venue: Messuhalli
- Date: 26 July 1952
- Competitors: 24 from 22 nations
- Winning total: 362.5 kg OR

Medalists
1st place, gold medalist(s)		Tommy Kono	United States
2nd place, silver medalist(s)		Yevgeny Lopatin	Soviet Union
3rd place, bronze medalist(s)		Vern Barberis	Australia

The men's 67.5 kg weightlifting competitions at the 1952 Summer Olympics in Helsinki took place on 26 July at Messuhalli. It was the seventh appearance of the lightweight class.

Each weightlifter had three attempts at each of the three lifts. The best score for each lift was summed to give a total. The weightlifter could increase the weight between attempts (minimum of 5 kg between first and second attempts, 2.5 kg between second and third attempts) but could not decrease weight. If two or more weightlifters finished with the same total, the competitors' body weights were used as the tie-breaker (lighter athlete wins).

== Records ==
Prior to this competition, the existing world and Olympic records were as follows.

World record	Press	N. Nikulin (URS)	112 kg		1951
World record	Snatch	Ibrahim Shams (EGY)	116.5 kg		1939
World record	Clean & Jerk	Ibrahim Shams (EGY)	153.5 kg		1939
World record	Total	Stanley Stanczyk (USA)	367.5 kg	Paris, France	18–19 October 1946
Olympic record	Press	John Stuart (CAN)	107.5 kg	London, United Kingdom	10 August 1948
Olympic record	Snatch	Ibrahim Shams (EGY)	115 kg	London, United Kingdom	10 August 1948
Olympic record	Clean & Jerk	Ibrahim Shams (EGY)	147.5 kg	London, United Kingdom	10 August 1948
Olympic record	Total	Ibrahim Shams (EGY)	360 kg	London, United Kingdom	10 August 1948

== Results ==
Rank	Athlete	Nation	Body weight	Press (kg)				Snatch (kg)				Clean & Jerk (kg)				Total
Rank	Athlete	Nation	Body weight	1	2	3	Result	1	2	3	Result	1	2	3	Result	Total
1st place, gold medalist(s)	Tommy Kono	United States	67.35	105	~~110~~	~~110~~	105	105	110	117.5	117.5 WR	140	~~155~~	~~155~~	140	362.5 OR
2nd place, silver medalist(s)	Yevgeny Lopatin	Soviet Union	66.95	100	~~105~~	~~105~~	100	102.5	107.5	~~110~~	107.5	135	140	142.5	142.5	350
3rd place, bronze medalist(s)	Vern Barberis	Australia	67.30	97.5	102.5	105	105	100	~~105~~	105	105	132.5	140	~~142.5~~	140	350
4	Kim Chang-hee	South Korea	67.10	95	100	~~102.5~~	100	97.5	102.5	105	105	135	~~140~~	140	140	345
5	Hassan Ferdos	Iran	67.20	97.5	~~102.5~~	102.5	102.5	102.5	~~107.5~~	107.5	107.5	~~130~~	130	135	135	345
6	Abdel Qader El-Touni	Egypt	66.65	97.5	102.5	105	105	100	105	107.5	107.5	~~130~~	~~130~~	130	130	342.5
7	Johan Runge	Denmark	66.80	100	105	—	105	92.5	~~97.5~~	97.5	97.5	122.5	127.5	~~130~~	127.5	330
8	Thio Ging Hwie	Indonesia	66.75	97.5	102.5	105	105	87.5	~~92.5~~	92.5	92.5	120	125	130	130	327.5
9	Ermanno Pignatti	Italy	67.50	92.5	~~97.5~~	~~97.5~~	92.5	100	105	~~107.5~~	105	122.5	127.5	~~132.5~~	127.5	325
10	Alfonso Canti	Italy	67.30	90	95	97.5	97.5	95	~~100~~	100	100	117.5	122.5	~~125~~	122.5	320
11	Robert Belza	Czechoslovakia	67.45	85	90	92.5	92.5	90	95	97.5	97.5	122.5	127.5	130	130	320
12	Arvid Andersson	Sweden	66.85	85	90	92.5	92.5	97.5	~~102.5~~	102.5	102.5	122.5	~~127.5~~	~~127.5~~	122.5	317.5
13	Barry Engelbrecht	South Africa	67.40	~~95~~	95	~~100~~	95	92.5	97.5	~~100~~	97.5	117.5	~~122.5~~	122.5	122.5	315
14	Nil Kyaw Yin	Burma	66.30	82.5	87.5	~~90~~	87.5	90	95	97.5	97.5	117.5	~~125~~	125	125	310
15	Tauno Suoniemi	Finland	67.30	95	~~100~~	~~100~~	95	~~95~~	~~95~~	95	95	~~120~~	120	~~125~~	120	310
16	Antonio Hoffmann	Puerto Rico	64.10	97.5	~~105~~	~~105~~	97.5	87.5	92.5	~~95~~	92.5	117.5	~~122.5~~	~~122.5~~	117.5	307.5
17	Josef Tauchner	Austria	67.45	90	~~95~~	~~95~~	90	92.5	~~97.5~~	~~97.5~~	92.5	120	125	~~130~~	125	307.5
18	Yorrie Evans	Great Britain	67.50	87.5	~~92.5~~	~~92.5~~	87.5	90	95	~~97.5~~	95	120	125	~~130~~	125	307.5
19	Björn Heyn	Norway	67.50	90	95	~~100~~	95	~~90~~	90	~~92.5~~	90	110	115	~~120~~	115	300
20	Roger Rubini	Switzerland	67.45	80	~~85~~	~~85~~	80	87.5	92.5	~~95~~	92.5	115	~~122.5~~	122.5	122.5	295
21	Edward Ścigała	Poland	66.60	75	~~80~~	80	80	85	90	~~92.5~~	90	115	~~120~~	120	120	290
22	James Halliday	Great Britain	67.40	87.5	92.5	~~95~~	92.5	102.5	110	112.5	112.5	~~130~~	~~135~~	~~135~~	—	205
23	Toni Leuthe	Germany	67.00	90	~~95~~	~~95~~	90	95	100	~~102.5~~	100	~~125~~	~~125~~	~~125~~	—	190
24	Thong Saw Pak	Singapore	66.65	90	95	~~97.5~~	95	~~90~~	~~90~~	~~90~~	—	—	—	—	—	95

== New records ==
Snatch	117.5 kg	Tommy Kono (USA)	WR
Total	362.5 kg	Tommy Kono (USA)	OR
