= Weightlifting at the 1950 British Empire Games =

- Venue: Auckland Town Hall (Concert Chamber)
- Location: Auckland, New Zealand
- Dates: 4 – 11 February 1950

Weightlifting at the 1950 British Empire Games was the maiden appearance of Weightlifting at the Commonwealth Games. The events took place in the Auckland Town Hall (Concert Chamber).

Malaya topped the weightlifting medal table with two gold, one silver and one bronze medal.

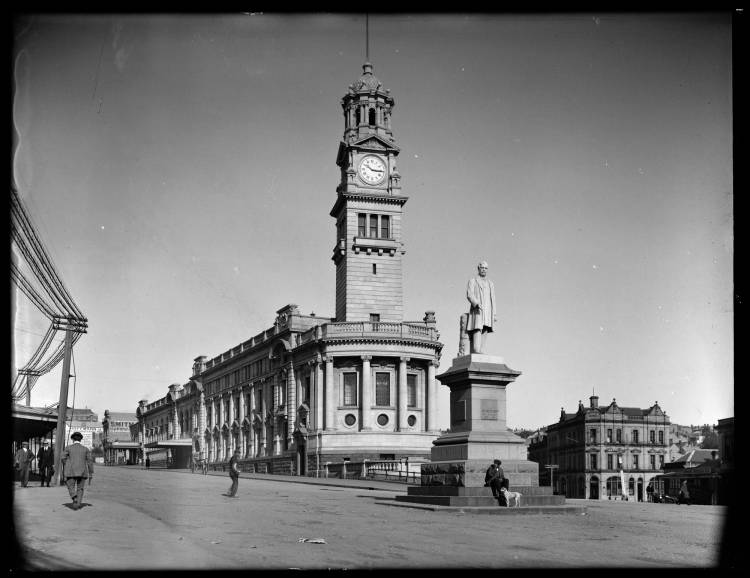
The Auckland Town Hall was the venue for the weightlifting

== Medal table ==
* Host nation (New Zealand)

Medals won by nation with totals, ranked by number of golds—sortable
Rank	Nation	Gold	Silver	Bronze	Total
1	Malaya	2	1	1	4
2	Canada	2	1	0	3
3	England	1	1	0	2
3	New Zealand*	1	1	0	2
5	Australia	0	1	3	4
6	South Africa	0	1	1	2
Totals (6 entries)		6	6	5	17

== Medal winners ==
Event	Gold	Silver	Bronze
Bantamweight	Tho Fook Hung; Malaya	Rosaire Smith; Canada	Keith Caple; Australia
Featherweight	Koh Eng Tong; Malaya	Julian Creus; England	Barrie Engelbrecht; South Africa
Lightweight	Jim Halliday; England	Thong Saw Pak; Malaya	Vern Barberis; Australia
Middleweight	Gerry Gratton; Canada	Tony George; New Zealand	Fred Griffin; Australia
Light Heavyweight	Jim Varaleau; Canada	Issy Bloomberg; South Africa	Tan Kim Bee; Malaya
Heavyweight	Harold Cleghorn; New Zealand	Ray Magee; Australia	none awarded

== Results ==
=== Bantamweight 56kg ===
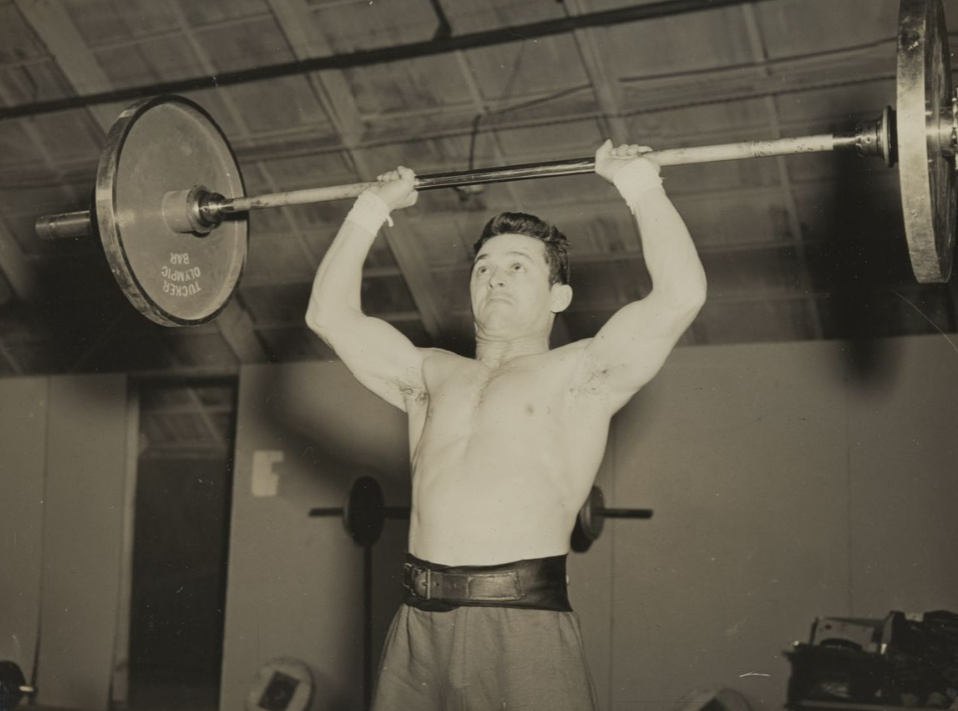
Rosaire Smith won silver Auckland Libraries Heritage Collections

Pos	Athlete	Weight
1	Tho Fook Hung (MAL)	655 lb
2	Rosaire Smith (CAN)	615 lb
3	Keith Caple (AUS)	600 lb
4	Maurice Megennis (ENG)	580 lb

=== Featherweight 60kg ===
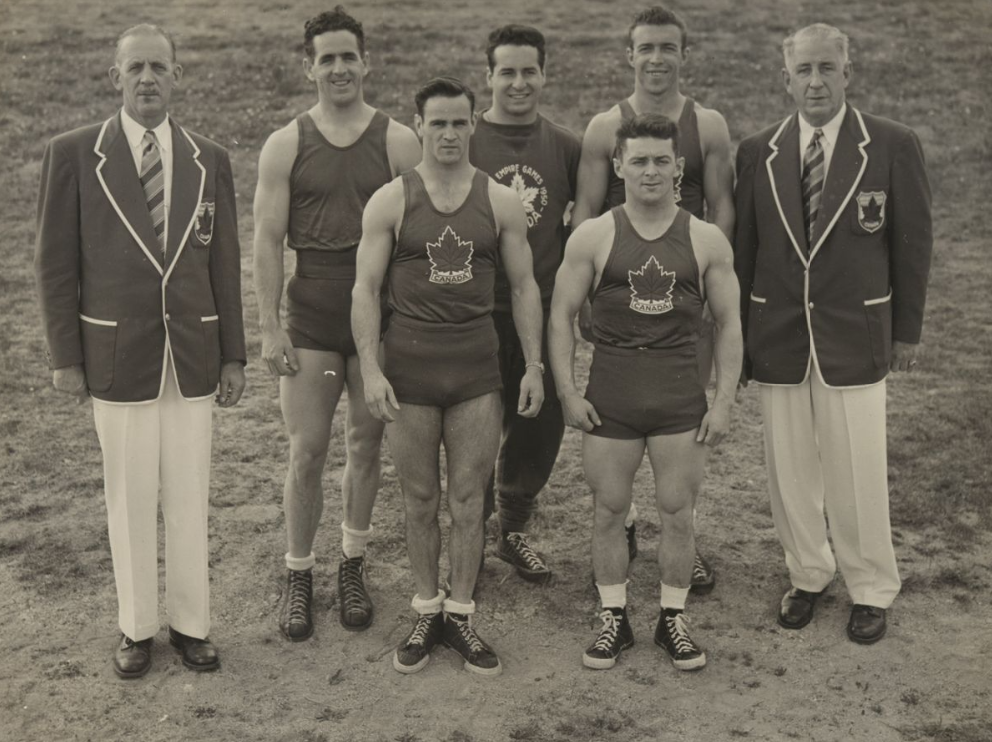
1950 British Empire Games weightlifting Canadian team Back row: Jim Varaleau, Gerald Gratton, John Stuart. Front row: J. W. Davies (General Manager), Jules Sylvain, Rosaire Smith (team captain) and Frank Saxon (team manager) Auckland Libraries Heritage Collections

Pos	Athlete	Weight
1	Koh Eng Tong (MAL)	685 lb
2	Julian Creus (ENG)	670 lb
3	Barrie Engelbrecht (RSA)	640 lb
4	Jules Sylvain (CAN)	635 lb
5	Herbert Rex Mobbs (AUS)	550 lb
6	Lewis Lawn (NZL)	540 lb

=== Lightweight 67.5kg ===
Pos	Athlete	Weight
1	Jim Halliday (ENG)	760 lb
2	Thong Saw Pak (MAL)	735 lb
3	Vern Barberis (AUS)	730 lb
4	Edwin Norton (NZL)	645 lb
5	John Stuart (CAN)	435 lb

=== Middleweight 75kg ===
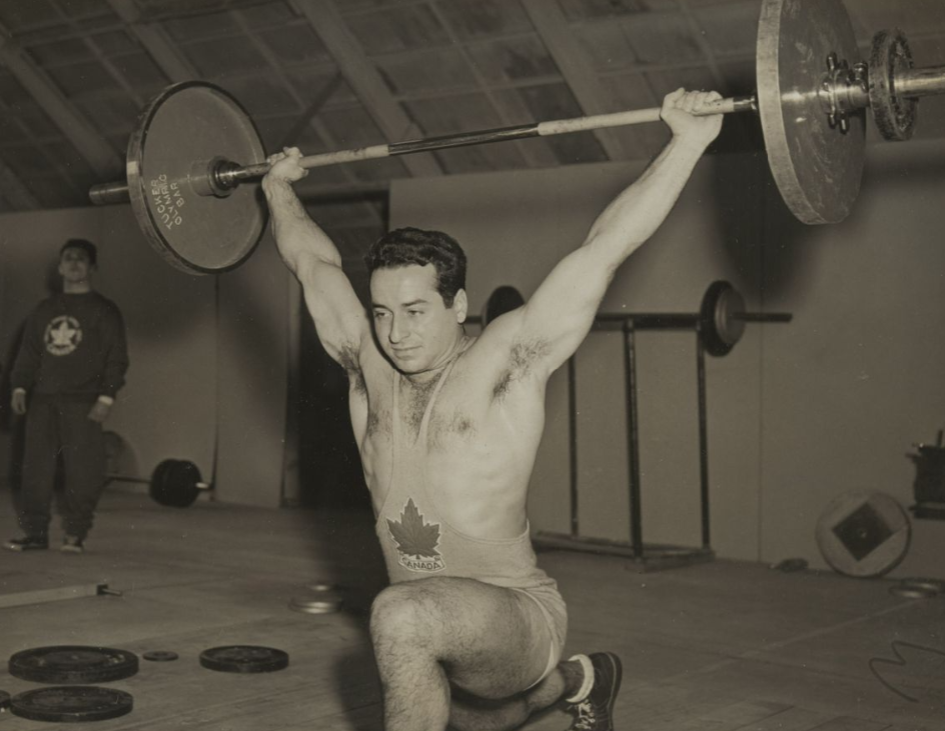
Gerry Grafton won gold Auckland Libraries Heritage Collections

Pos	Athlete	Weight
1	Gerry Gratton (CAN)	760 lb
2	Tony George (NZL)	735 lb
3	Fred Griffin (AUS)	720 lb
4	A. Oxden-Willows (SRH)	710 lb
5	Ernest Peppiatt (ENG)	ret

=== Light Heavyweight 82.5kg ===
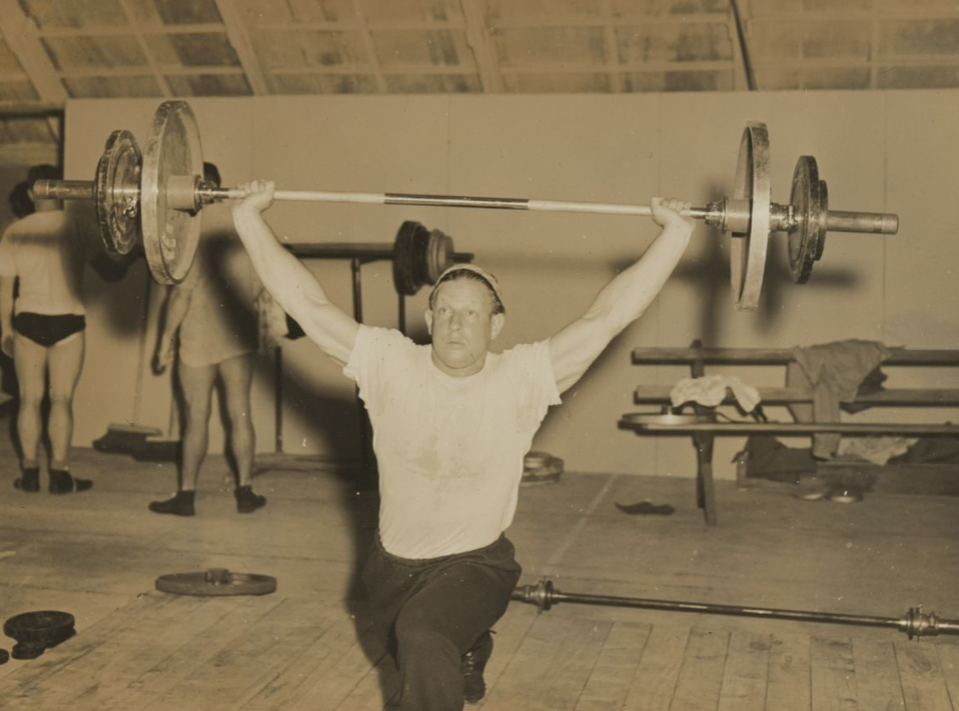
Issy Bloomberg won silver Auckland Libraries Heritage Collections

Pos	Athlete	Weight
1	Jim Varaleau (CAN)	815 lb
2	Issy Bloomberg (RSA)	815 lb
3	Tan Kim Bee (MAL)	765 lb
4	Trevor Clark (NZL)	730 lb
5	Hugh Morrison (SCO)	710 lb
6	Ken McDonald (AUS)	530 lb

=== Heavyweight 110kg ===
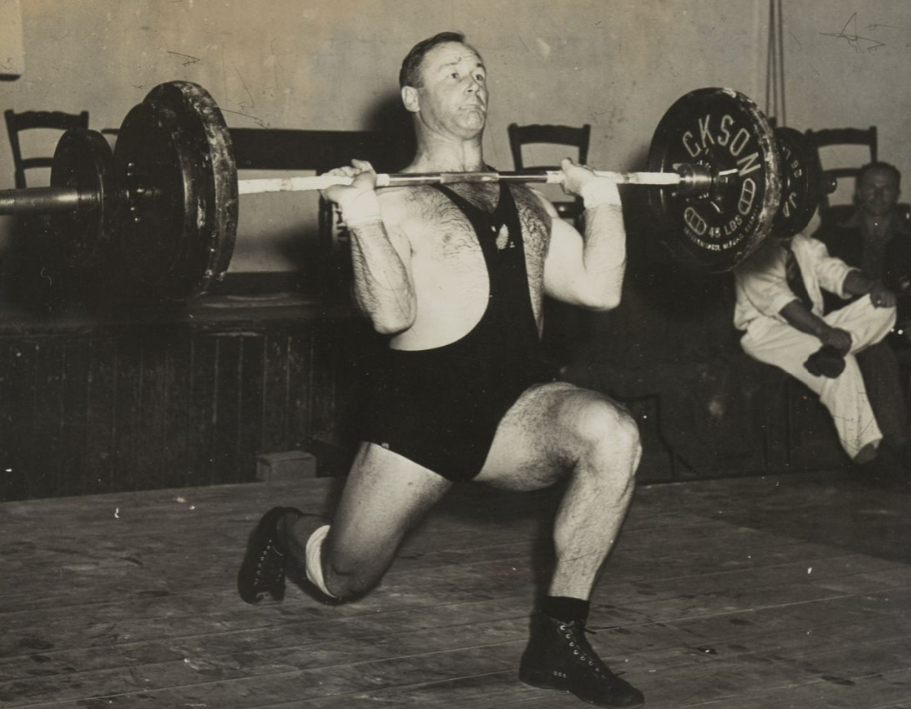
Harold Cleghorn won gold Auckland Libraries Heritage Collections

- Only two entries

Pos	Athlete	Weight
1	Harold Cleghorn (NZL)	900 lb
2	Ray Magee (AUS)	830 lb

== See also ==
- List of Commonwealth Games medallists in weightlifting
