= Weightlifting at the 1952 Summer Olympics – Men's 56 kg =

Men's 56 kg at the Games of the XV Olympiad
- Venue: Messuhalli
- Date: 25 July 1952
- Competitors: 19 from 18 nations
- Winning total: 315.0 kg =WR

Medalists
1st place, gold medalist(s)		Ivan Udodov	Soviet Union
2nd place, silver medalist(s)		Mahmoud Namjoo	Iran
3rd place, bronze medalist(s)		Ali Mirzaei	Iran

The men's 56 kg weightlifting competitions at the 1952 Summer Olympics in Helsinki took place on 25 July at Messuhalli. It was the second appearance of the bantamweight class.

Each weightlifter had three attempts at each of the three lifts. The best score for each lift was summed to give a total. The weightlifter could increase the weight between attempts (minimum of 5 kg between first and second attempts, 2.5 kg between second and third attempts) but could not decrease weight. If two or more weightlifters finished with the same total, the competitors' body weights were used as the tie-breaker (lighter athlete wins).

== Records ==
Prior to this competition, the existing world and Olympic records were as follows.

World record	Press	Joseph De Pietro (USA)	106.5 kg		1948
World record	Snatch	Ivan Udodov (URS)	98 kg		1952
World record	Clean & Jerk	Mahmoud Namdjou (IRN)	128 kg	Scheveningen, Netherlands	1949
World record	Total	Mahmoud Namdjou (IRN)	315 kg	Scheveningen, Netherlands	1949
Olympic record	Press	Joseph De Pietro (USA)	105 kg	London, United Kingdom	9 August 1948
Olympic record	Snatch	Julian Creus (GBR)	95 kg	London, United Kingdom	9 August 1948
Olympic record	Clean & Jerk	Mahmoud Namdjou (IRN)	122.5 kg	London, United Kingdom	9 August 1948
Olympic record	Total	Joseph De Pietro (USA)	307.5 kg	London, United Kingdom	9 August 1948

== Results ==
Rank	Athlete	Nation	Body weight	Press (kg)				Snatch (kg)				Clean & Jerk (kg)				Total
Rank	Athlete	Nation	Body weight	1	2	3	Result	1	2	3	Result	1	2	3	Result	Total
1st place, gold medalist(s)	Ivan Udodov	Soviet Union	55.85	85	~~90~~	90	90	92.5	~~97.5~~	97.5	97.5 OR	122.5	127.5	~~130~~	127.5 OR	315 =WR
2nd place, silver medalist(s)	Mahmoud Namjoo	Iran	56.00	85	90	~~95~~	90	90	95	~~97.5~~	95	~~122.5~~	122.5	~~132.5~~	122.5	307.5
3rd place, bronze medalist(s)	Ali Mirzaei	Iran	56.00	87.5	92.5	95	95	87.5	~~92.5~~	92.5	92.5	112.5	~~117.5~~	~~117.5~~	112.5	300
4	Kim Hae-nam	South Korea	55.75	~~80~~	~~80~~	80	80	90	~~95~~	95	95	120	~~125~~	~~125~~	120	295
5	Kamal Mahgoub	Egypt	55.20	75	~~80~~	~~80~~	75	90	95	~~97.5~~	95	115	~~122.5~~	122.5	122.5	292.5
6	Pedro Landero	Philippines	55.70	90	~~95~~	~~95~~	90	87.5	~~92.5~~	~~92.5~~	87.5	115	~~120~~	~~120~~	115	292.5
7	Maurice Megennis	Great Britain	56.00	77.5	82.5	~~85~~	82.5	77.5	85	~~87.5~~	85	105	110	112.5	112.5	280
8	Lon bin Mohamed Noor	Singapore	54.55	77.5	~~82.5~~	~~82.5~~	77.5	80	~~85~~	85	85	107.5	112.5	~~115~~	112.5	275
9	Rosaire Smith	Canada	55.80	75	~~80~~	~~80~~	75	80	~~85~~	85	85	107.5	112.5	115	115	275
10	Karel Saitl	Czechoslovakia	55.75	75	80	~~82.5~~	80	80	~~85~~	~~85~~	80	105	110	112.5	112.5	272.5
11	Nils Jacobsson	Sweden	55.75	75	80	~~82.5~~	80	80	87.5	~~90~~	87.5	105	~~110~~	~~110~~	105	272.5
12	Marcel Thévenet	France	55.80	~~85~~	85	~~90~~	85	72.5	77.5	~~82.5~~	77.5	100	105	107.5	107.5	270
13	Aarne Vehkonen	Finland	55.45	67.5	72.5	—	72.5	85	~~90~~	~~90~~	85	105	110	~~112.5~~	110	267.5
14	Josef Schuster	Germany	55.55	85	90	~~92.5~~	90	70	75	~~77.5~~	75	~~95~~	95	102.5	102.5	267.5
15	Nicolas Vivas	Puerto Rico	55.70	75	~~82.5~~	~~82.5~~	75	80	~~87.5~~	87.5	87.5	102.5	~~110~~	~~110~~	102.5	265
16	Roland Magnenat	Switzerland	55.60	65	70	~~72.5~~	70	~~72.5~~	72.5	77.5	77.5	95	100	102.5	102.5	250
17	Augustyn Dziedzic	Poland	55.70	~~70~~	~~70~~	70	70	75	80	~~82.5~~	80	95	~~100~~	~~100~~	95	245
18	Alexandru Cosma	Romania	55.95	~~70~~	~~70~~	~~70~~	—	70	~~77.5~~	—	70	~~100~~	~~105~~	—	—	70
19	Isamu Shiraishi	Japan	56.00	—	—	~~80~~	—	—	—	—	—	—	—	—	—	—

== New records ==
Snatch	97.5 kg	Ivan Udodov (URS)	OR
Clean & Jerk	127.5 kg	Ivan Udodov (URS)	OR
Total	315 kg	Ivan Udodov (URS)	OR, =WR
