= Weightlifting at the 1948 Summer Olympics – Men's 67.5 kg =

Men's 67.5 kg at the Games of the XIV Olympiad
- Venue: Empress Hall (Earls Court Exhibition Centre)
- Date: 10 August 1948
- Competitors: 22 from 17 nations
- Winning total: 360 kg OR

Medalists
1st place, gold medalist(s)		Ibrahim Shams	Egypt
2nd place, silver medalist(s)		Attia Hamouda	Egypt
3rd place, bronze medalist(s)		James Halliday	Great Britain

The men's 67.5 kg weightlifting competitions at the 1948 Summer Olympics in London took place on 10 August at the Empress Hall of the Earls Court Exhibition Centre. It was the sixth time the lightweight class competition was held, all at 67.5 kg.

Each weightlifter had three attempts at each of the three lifts. The best score for each lift was summed to give a total. The weightlifter could increase the weight between attempts (minimum of 5 kg between first and second attempts, 2.5 kg between second and third attempts) but could not decrease weight. If two or more weightlifters finished with the same total, the competitors' body weights were used as the tie-breaker (lighter athlete wins).

== Records ==
Prior to this competition, the existing world and Olympic records were as follows.

World record	Press	Jeno (HUN)	109 kg		1948
World record	Snatch	Ibrahim Shams (EGY)	116.5 kg		1939
World record	Clean & Jerk	Ibrahim Shams (EGY)	153.5 kg		1939
World record	Total	Stanley Stanczyk (USA)	367.5 kg	Paris, France	18–19 October 1946
Olympic record	Press	Robert Fein (AUT)	105 kg	Berlin, Germany	2 August 1936
Olympic record	Snatch	Anwar Mesbah (EGY)	105 kg	Berlin, Germany	2 August 1936
Olympic record	Clean & Jerk	Anwar Mesbah (EGY)	145 kg	Berlin, Germany	2 August 1936
Olympic record	Total	Anwar Mesbah (EGY)	342.5 kg	Berlin, Germany	2 August 1936
Olympic record	Total	Robert Fein (AUT)	342.5 kg	Berlin, Germany	2 August 1936

== Results ==
Rank	Athlete	Nation	Body weight	Press (kg)				Snatch (kg)				Clean & Jerk (kg)				Total
Rank	Athlete	Nation	Body weight	1	2	3	Result	1	2	3	Result	1	2	3	Result	Total
1st place, gold medalist(s)	Ibrahim Shams	Egypt	65.74	92.5	~~97.5~~	97.5	97.5	107.5	112.5	115	115 OR	140	~~145~~	147.5	147.5 OR	360 OR
2nd place, silver medalist(s)	Attia Hamouda	Egypt	67.10	100	~~105~~	105	105	102.5	107.5	110	110	135	140	145	145	360 OR
3rd place, bronze medalist(s)	James Halliday	Great Britain	67.13	90	~~95~~	~~95~~	90	105	~~110~~	110	110	130	135	140	140	340
4	John Terpak	United States	67.17	97.5	102.5	~~105~~	102.5	102.5	~~107.5~~	~~107.5~~	102.5	130	135	~~137.5~~	135	340
5	John Stuart	Canada	67.46	102.5	107.5	~~110~~	107.5 OR	100	~~105~~	~~105~~	100	125	~~130~~	~~130~~	125	332.5
6	Kim Chang-hui	South Korea	66.42	90	95	~~97.5~~	95	95	100	~~102.5~~	100	130	135	~~140~~	135	330
7	Na Si-yun	South Korea	66.47	90	~~95~~	~~95~~	90	95	~~100~~	100	100	130	135	140	140	330
8	Joe Pitman	United States	66.62	95	100	~~102.5~~	100	95	~~100~~	~~100~~	95	127.5	~~132.5~~	~~132.5~~	127.5	322.5
9	George Espeut	Jamaica	66.91	~~95~~	95	100	100	95	~~100~~	~~100~~	95	127.5	~~132.5~~	~~132.5~~	127.5	322.5
10	Jørgen Fryd Petersen	Denmark	66.94	85	90	~~92.5~~	90	92.5	97.5	~~100~~	97.5	120	125	127.5	127.5	315
11	René Aleman	France	67.22	90	95	~~97.5~~	95	90	95	97.5	97.5	122.5	~~127.5~~	~~127.5~~	122.5	315
12	Giuseppe Colantuono	Italy	66.88	87.5	92.5	~~95~~	92.5	90	95	~~100~~	95	120	125	~~127.5~~	125	312.5
13	Ron Eland	Great Britain	65.52	90	~~95~~	95	95	90	~~95~~	95	95	115	120	–	120	310
14	Sigvard Kinnunen	Sweden	67.38	85	~~90~~	~~90~~	85	95	100	102.5	102.5	~~120~~	120	~~125~~	120	307.5
15	Frank Teräskari	Finland	67.45	~~82.5~~	82.5	~~87.5~~	82.5	100	105	~~107.5~~	105	~~120~~	120	~~130~~	120	307.5
16	Gonzalo Alvarado	Peru	66.95	90	~~95~~	~~95~~	90	90	95	~~97.5~~	95	115	120	~~125~~	120	305
17	Théophile Huyge	Belgium	66.90	85	~~90~~	~~90~~	85	87.5	~~92.5~~	92.5	92.5	115	120	122.5	122.5	300
18	Salvador Lo Presti	Argentina	67.16	85	~~90~~	90	90	85	90	~~95~~	90	115	120	~~125~~	120	300
19	Asadollah Mihani	Iran	66.21	85	~~90~~	~~90~~	85	92.5	~~97.5~~	~~97.5~~	92.5	117.5	~~122.5~~	~~125~~	117.5	295
20	Hugo D'Atri	Argentina	67.5	80	85	~~90~~	85	85	90	~~92.5~~	90	110	115	120	120	295
21	Hugo Banda	Mexico	63.79	80	85	~~87.5~~	85	70	75	80	80	102.5	107.5	~~112.5~~	107.5	275
22	Fernando Louro	Cuba	66.58	92.5	~~97.5~~	~~97.5~~	92.5	92.5	~~97.5~~	–	92.5	~~117.5~~	~~117.5~~	–	0	185

== New records ==
Press	107.5 kg	John Stuart (CAN)	OR
Snatch	115 kg	Ibrahim Shams (EGY)	OR
Clean & Jerk	147.5 kg	Ibrahim Shams (EGY)	OR
Total	360 kg	Ibrahim Shams (EGY); Attia Hamouda (EGY)	OR
