= Weightlifting at the 1954 British Empire and Commonwealth Games =

- Venue: Exhibition Garden
- Location: Hastings Park, Vancouver, Canada
- Dates: 30 July 1954 – 7 August 1954

Weightlifting at the 1954 British Empire and Commonwealth Games was the second appearance of Weightlifting at the Commonwealth Games. The events took place in the Exhibition Garden in Hastings Park, Vancouver, Canada.

Canada topped the weightlifting medal table with three gold medals.

Doug Hepburn from Canada, the reigning world heavyweight champion was given a gold medal incentive by city hall, that of building a new gym in the city but despite his victory it never materialised.

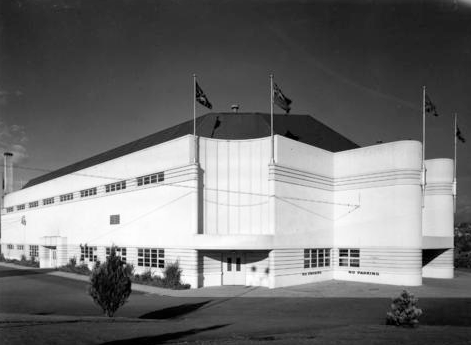
The Exhibition Garden building in Hastings Park was the venue for the weightlifting

== Medal table ==
* Host nation (Canada)

Medals won by nation with totals, ranked by number of golds—sortable
Rank	Nation	Gold	Silver	Bronze	Total
1	Canada*	3	2	0	5
2	England	2	1	1	4
3	Trinidad and Tobago	1	2	0	3
4	Australia	1	0	1	2
5	South Africa	0	1	1	2
6	Barbados	0	1	0	1
7	New Zealand	0	0	2	2
8	British Guiana	0	0	1	1
8	Wales	0	0	1	1
10	Jamaica	0	0	0	0
10	Northern Rhodesia	0	0	0	0
10	Pakistan	0	0	0	0
10	Southern Rhodesia	0	0	0	0
Totals (13 entries)		7	7	7	21

== Medal winners ==
Event	Gold	Silver	Bronze
Bantamweight	Maurice Megennis; England	Frank Cope; England	Keith Caple; Australia
Featherweight	Rodney Wilkes; Trinidad and Tobago	Jules Sylvain; Canada	Ron Jenkins; Wales
Lightweight	Vern Barberis; Australia	George Nicholls; Barbados	Jan Pieterse; South Africa
Middleweight	Jim Halliday; England	Lionel de Freitas; Trinidad and Tobago	Julius Park; British Guiana
Light Heavyweight	Gerry Gratton; Canada	Louis Greeff; South Africa	Tony George; New Zealand
Middle Heavyweight	Keevil Daly; Canada	Lennox Kilgour; Trinidad and Tobago	Joseph Barnett; England
Heavyweight	Doug Hepburn; Canada	Dave Baillie; Canada	Harold Cleghorn; New Zealand

== Results ==
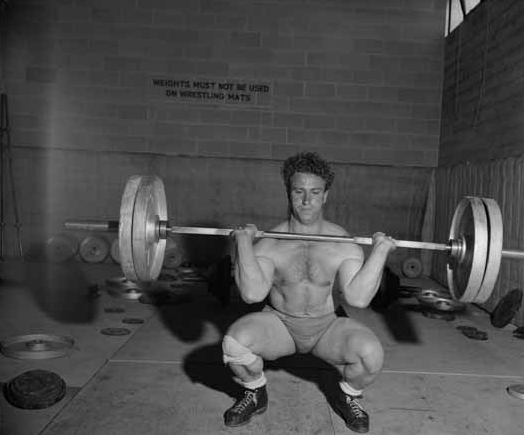
1954 Games event taking place. Attribution:Province newspaper

=== Bantamweight 56kg ===
Pos	Athlete	Weight
1	Maurice Megennis (ENG)	620 lb
2	Frank Cope (ENG)	610 lb
3	Keith Caple (AUS)	605 lb
4	L. Spence (JAM)	600 lb
5	Reg Gaffley (SAF)	dnf

=== Featherweight 60kg ===
Pos	Athlete	Weight
1	Rodney Wilkes (TRI)	690 lb
2	Jules Sylvain (CAN)	655 lb
3	Ron Jenkins (WAL)	615 lb

=== Lightweight 67.5kg ===
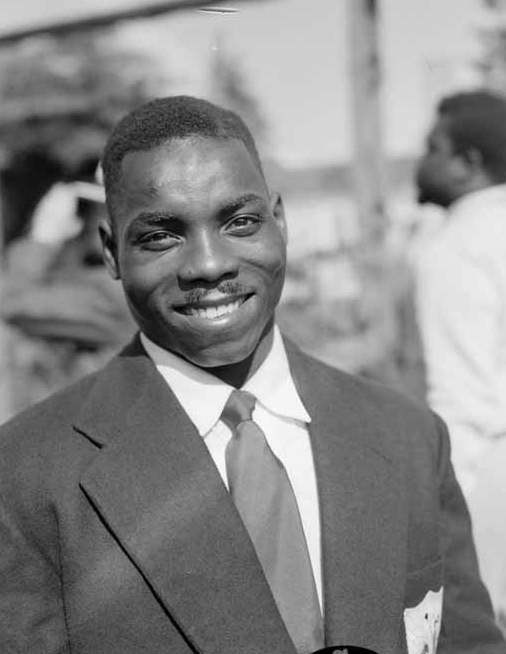
George Nicholls from Barbados won the silver medal. Attribution:Province newspaper

Pos	Athlete	Weight
1	Vern Barberis (AUS)	765 lb
2	George Nicholls (BAR)	760 lb
3	Jan Pieterse (SAF)	735 lb
4	E. Wroth (NRH)	690 lb
5	Stan Gibson (CAN)	685 lb
6	Jim McIntosh (SCO)	685 lb

=== Middleweight 75kg ===
Pos	Athlete	Weight
1	Jim Halliday (CAN)	800 lb
2	Lionel de Freitas (TRI)	755 lb
3	Julius Park (BGU)	745 lb
4	Piet Viljoen (NRH)	745 lb
5	D. E. Heron (JAM)	705 lb
6	Jean Dube (CAN)	695 lb
7	A. Oxden-Willows (SRH)	680 lb
8	J. B. Rich (SRH)	680 lb

=== Light Heavyweight 82.5kg ===
Pos	Athlete	Weight
1	Gerry Gratton (CAN)	890 lb
2	Louis Greeff (RSA)	810 lb
3	Tony George (NZL)	780 lb
4	Sydney Harrington (ENG)	765 lb
5	Phil Caira (SCO)	765 lb
6	M. I. Butt (PAK)	750 lb

=== Middle Heavyweight 90kg ===
Pos	Athlete	Weight
1	Keevil Daly (CAN)	880 lb
2	Lennox Kilgour (TRI)	865 lb
3	Mel Barnett (ENG)	830 lb
4	Harrison Skeete (TRI)	815 lb
5	Trevor Clark (NZL)	790 lb
6	Algernon S. Taffe (JAM)	755 lb
7	Alwyn Evans (WAL)	745 lb
8	Ken McDonald (AUS)	dnf

=== Heavyweight 110kg ===
Pos	Athlete	Weight
1	Doug Hepburn (CAN)	1040 lb
2	Dave Baillie (CAN)	1000 lb
3	Harold Cleghorn (NZL)	930 lb

== See also ==
- List of Commonwealth Games medallists in weightlifting
