= Weightlifting at the 1948 Summer Olympics – Men's 75 kg =

Men's 75 kg at the Games of the XIV Olympiad
- Venue: Empress Hall (Earls Court Exhibition Centre)
- Date: 10 August 1948
- Competitors: 24 from 18 nations
- Winning total: 390 kg OR

Medalists
1st place, gold medalist(s)		Frank Spellman	United States
2nd place, silver medalist(s)		Pete George	United States
3rd place, bronze medalist(s)		Kim Sung-Jip	South Korea

The men's 75 kg weightlifting competitions at the 1948 Summer Olympics in London took place on 10 August at the Empress Hall of the Earls Court Exhibition Centre. It was the sixth time the middleweight class competition was held, all at 75 kg.

Each weightlifter had three attempts at each of the three lifts. The best score for each lift was summed to give a total. The weightlifter could increase the weight between attempts (minimum of 5 kg between first and second attempts, 2.5 kg between second and third attempts) but could not decrease weight. If two or more weightlifters finished with the same total, the competitors' body weights were used as the tie-breaker (lighter athlete wins).

== Records ==
Prior to this competition, the existing world and Olympic records were as follows.

World record	Press	Khadr El-Touni (EGY)	127.5 kg		1948
World record	Snatch	Stanley Stanczyk (USA)	116.5 kg		1947
World record	Clean & Jerk	Stanley Stanczyk (USA)	153.5 kg		1947
World record	Total	Stanley Stanczyk (USA)	405 kg	Philadelphia, United States	26–27 September 1947
Olympic record	Press	Khadr El-Touni (EGY)	117.5 kg	Berlin, Germany	5 August 1936
Olympic record	Snatch	Khadr El-Touni (EGY)	120 kg	Berlin, Germany	5 August 1936
Olympic record	Clean & Jerk	Khadr El-Touni (EGY)	150 kg	Berlin, Germany	5 August 1936
Olympic record	Total	Khadr El-Touni (EGY)	387.5 kg	Berlin, Germany	5 August 1936

== Results ==
Rank	Athlete	Nation	Body weight	Press (kg)				Snatch (kg)				Clean & Jerk (kg)				Total
Rank	Athlete	Nation	Body weight	1	2	3	Result	1	2	3	Result	1	2	3	Result	Total
1st place, gold medalist(s)	Frank Spellman	United States	73.08	110	115	117.5	117.5	112.5	117.5	120	120	142.5	150	152.5	152.5	390 OR
2nd place, silver medalist(s)	Pete George	United States	73.25	100	~~105~~	105	105	112.5	~~117.5~~	122.5	122.5 OR	150	155	~~165~~	155 OR	382.5
3rd place, bronze medalist(s)	Kim Sung-Jip	South Korea	72.92	115	120	122.5	122.5 OR	105	110	112.5	112.5	140	145	~~147.5~~	145	380
4	Khadr El-Touni	Egypt	74.90	115	120	~~122.5~~	120	112.5	117.5	~~120~~	117.5	~~140~~	142.5	~~147.5~~	142.5	380
5	Gerry Gratton	Canada	74.95	107.5	112.5	~~115~~	112.5	~~107.5~~	107.5	~~110~~	107.5	132.5	137.5	140	140	360
6	Pierre Bouladou	France	74.27	95	100	102.5	102.5	105	110	~~115~~	110	135	140	142.5	142.5	355
7	Orlando Garrido	Cuba	75.00	107.5	112.5	~~115~~	112.5	~~100~~	100	107.5	107.5	125	~~135~~	135	135	355
8	William Watson	Great Britain	74.13	95	~~100~~	100	100	105	110	~~112.5~~	110	135	~~140~~	140	140	350
9	Georges Firmin	France	75.00	92.5	97.5	100	100	~~102.5~~	102.5	107.5	107.5	~~135~~	135	140	140	347.5
10	Joe Sklar	Canada	73.90	100	105	~~107.5~~	105	100	105	107.5	107.5	132.5	~~140~~	~~140~~	132.5	345
11	Lennart Nelson	Sweden	74.88	95	~~100~~	100	95	105	~~110~~	~~112.5~~	105	~~125~~	125	135	135	335
12	Jan Smeekens	Netherlands	74.95	95	~~100~~	~~100~~	95	102.5	~~107.5~~	~~107.5~~	102.5	125	~~132.5~~	132.5	132.5	330
13	Nasser Mirghavami	Iran	74.31	~~102.5~~	~~102.5~~	102.5	102.5	90	~~95~~	~~100~~	95	120	125	130	130	327.5
14	Issy Bloomberg	South Africa	74.80	100	105	~~107.5~~	105	97.5	~~102.5~~	~~102.5~~	97.5	120	125	~~130~~	125	327.5
15	Ernie Peppiatt	Great Britain	74.85	100	~~105~~	~~105~~	100	97.5	102.5	~~105~~	102.5	125	~~130~~	~~130~~	125	327.5
16	Klement Schuh	Austria	73.20	95	~~100~~	100	100	95	~~100~~	~~100~~	95	~~125~~	125	~~130~~	125	320
17	Armando Rueda	Mexico	73.84	95	100	~~102.5~~	100	90	95	~~100~~	95	120	~~125~~	~~125~~	120	315
18	Julio Bonnet	Argentina	72.00	85	90	~~92.5~~	90	95	100	~~105~~	100	115	~~122.5~~	122.5	122.5	312.5
19	Fritz Mast	Switzerland	74.65	~~90~~	90	~~95~~	90	95	100	~~105~~	100	~~120~~	120	~~125~~	120	310
20	Juan Russo	Argentina	74.80	85	90	~~92.5~~	90	90	95	~~100~~	95	115	120	125	125	310
21	Orlando Chaves	Guyana	70.25	~~82.5~~	82.5	~~87.5~~	82.5	92.5	97.5	100	100	120	125	~~127.5~~	125	307.5
22	Muhammad Iqbal Butt	Pakistan	74.83	82.5	87.5	92.5	92.5	~~85~~	85	90	90	117.5	122.5	~~127.5~~	122.5	305
23	Roger Rubini	Switzerland	68.60	75	80	82.5	82.5	85	90	~~95~~	90	115	120	~~127.5~~	120	292.5
24	Jørgen Moritzen	Denmark	72.85	87.5	~~92.5~~	~~92.5~~	87.5	95	~~100~~	–	95	–	–	–	0	182.5

== New records ==
Press	122.5 kg	Kim Sung-Jip (KOR)	OR
Snatch	122.5 kg	Pete George (USA)	OR
Clean & Jerk	155 kg	Pete George (USA)	OR
Total	390 kg	Frank Spellman (USA)	OR
