= James McIntosh =

James, Jamie, Jim or Jimmy McIntosh may refer to:

- James M. McIntosh (1828–1862), Confederate Army general
- James McIntosh (Medal of Honor) (1829–1908), American Medal of Honor recipient
- James McIntosh (rower) (1930–2018), American rower
- Jamie McIntosh (fl. 2002–2012), director of International Justice Mission Canada
- James McIntosh (footballer, born 1886) (1886–1959), Scottish footballer
- James McIntosh (food writer) (born 1978), Northern Irish food writer
- Jim McIntosh (footballer) (born 1950), Scottish footballer
- Jimmy McIntosh (1918–2000), Scottish footballer and manager
- Jimmy McIntosh (baseball), American baseball player
- Jimmy McIntosh (footballer, born 1936) (1936–2016), Scottish footballer
- Jim McIntosh (weightlifter), Scottish weightlifter

== See also ==
- James Mackintosh (1765–1832), Scottish jurist, Whig politician and historian
- James Mackintosh (percussionist), Scottish drummer
- James Mackintosh (politician), New Zealand politician
