= 1947 World Weightlifting Championships =

International weightlifting competition

1947 Men's World Championships
- Host city: Philadelphia, United States
- Dates: September 26–27, 1947

The 1947 Men's World Weightlifting Championships were held in Philadelphia, United States from September 26 to September 27, 1947. There were 39 men in action from 12 nations.

== Medal summary ==
Event	Gold		Silver		Bronze	
Bantamweight; 56 kg	Joseph DePietro; United States	300.0 kg	Richard Tom; United States	287.5 kg	Rosaire Smith; Canada	277.5 kg
Featherweight; 60 kg	Robert Higgins; United States	310.0 kg	Nam Su-il; South Korea	307.5 kg	Emerick Ishikawa; United States	302.5 kg
Lightweight; 67.5 kg	Pete George; United States	352.5 kg	John Stuart; Canada	350.0 kg	George Espeut; Great Britain	342.5 kg
Middleweight; 75 kg	Stanley Stanczyk; United States	405.0 kg	Frank Spellman; United States	375.0 kg	Kim Sung-jip; South Korea	352.5 kg
Light heavyweight 82.5 kg	John Terpak; United States	387.5 kg	Keevil Daly; British Guiana	370.0 kg	Juhani Vellamo; Finland	367.5 kg
Heavyweight +82.5 kg	John Davis; United States	455.0 kg	Norbert Schemansky; United States	412.5 kg	Václav Bečvář; Czechoslovakia	360.0 kg

== Medal table ==
Rank	Nation	Gold	Silver	Bronze	Total
1	United States	6	3	1	10
2	Canada	0	1	1	2
2	South Korea	0	1	1	2
4	British Guiana	0	1	0	1
5	Czechoslovakia	0	0	1	1
5	Finland	0	0	1	1
5	Great Britain	0	0	1	1
Totals (7 entries)		6	6	6	18
