= Wales at the 1954 British Empire and Commonwealth Games =

- CGF code: WAL
- CGA: Wales at the Commonwealth Games
- Website: teamwales.cymru

in Vancouver, Canada
- Medals Ranked 13th: Gold 1 Silver 1 Bronze 5 Total 7

British Empire and Commonwealth Games appearances
- 1930; 1934; 1938; 1950; 1954; 1958; 1962; 1966; 1970; 1974; 1978; 1982; 1986; 1990; 1994; 1998; 2002; 2006; 2010; 2014; 2018; 2022; 2026; 2030

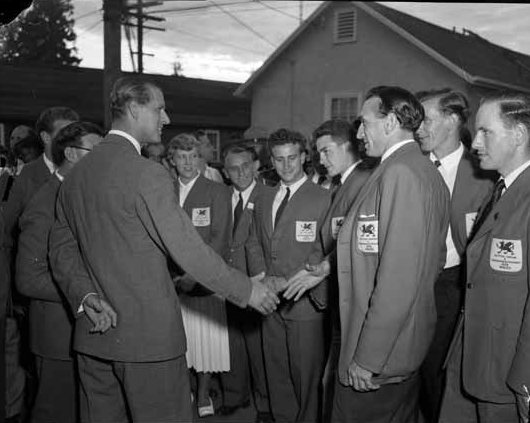
Prince Philip welcomes the Welsh team Attribution:Province newspaper

Wales at the 1954 British Empire and Commonwealth Games (abbreviated WAL) was the fifth time that the nation had participated at the Games following the appearances in 1930, 1934, 1938 and 1950.

The Games were held in Vancouver, Canada, from 30 July to 7 August 1954. Wales came 13th overall with one gold, one silver and five bronze medals.

Wales sent 20 athlete to the games, a considerable increase on the three athletes sent four years previous. The team was sent to the 1954 Games amidst news that the British Empire and Commonwealth Games Council for Wales wished to raise a 50,000 sum to enable the nation to host the 1958 games.

Weightlifter Mel Barnett and rower David Glynne-Jones both competed for England instead of Wales.

== Medals ==
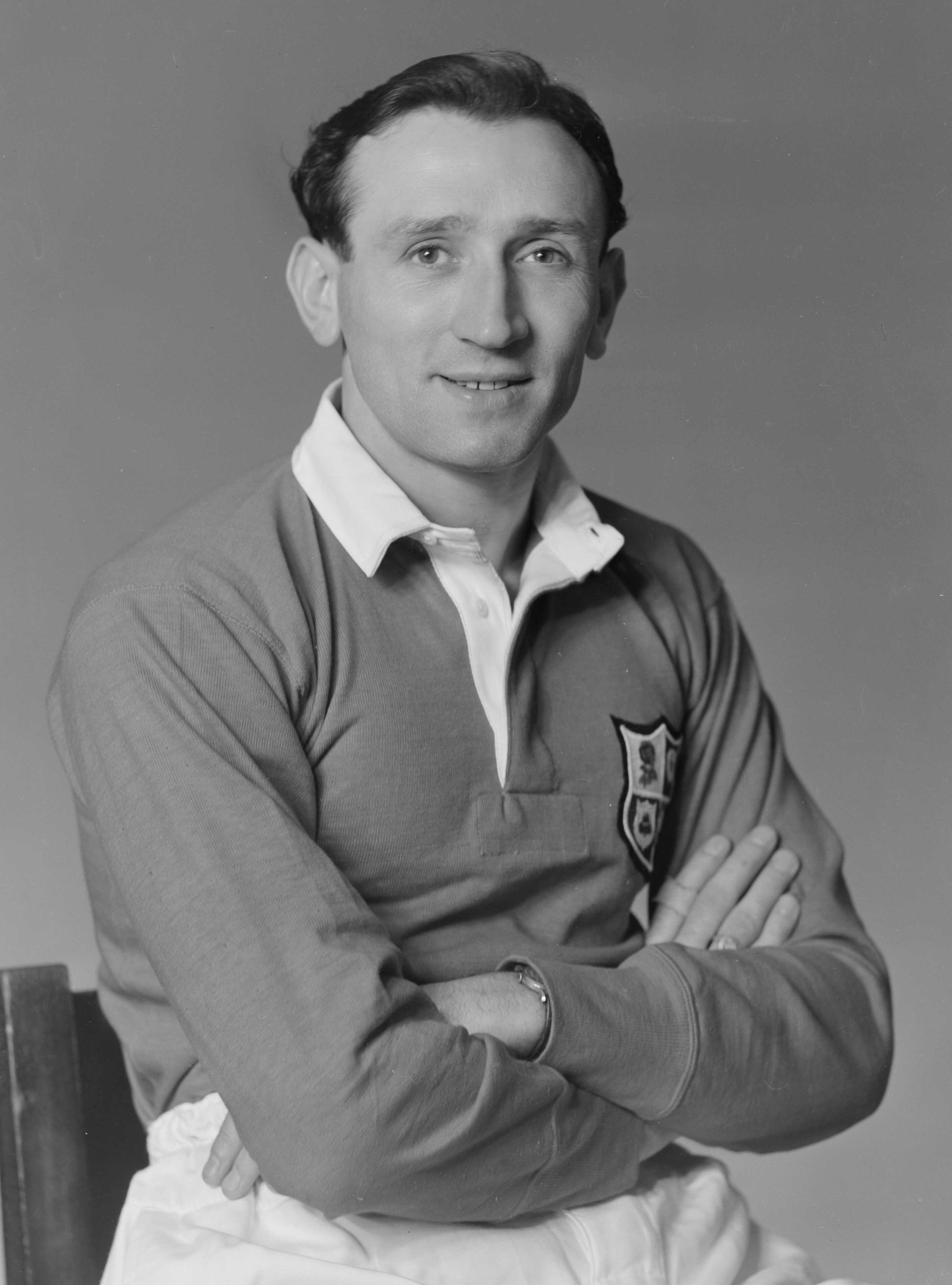
Ken Jones won a bronze medal in the 220 yards

=== Gold ===
- John Brockway, Swimming

=== Silver ===
- Malcolm Collins, Boxing

=== Bronze ===
- Aileen Harding, Fencing
- Ron Jenkins, Weightlifting
- Ken Jones, Athletics
- Bob Shaw, Athletics
- Don Skene, Cycling

== Team ==
=== Athletics ===
Athlete	Events	Notes	Medals
John Disley	1, 3 mile	London AC	
Ken Jones	100/220 yards	Newport AC	Bronze medal
Peter Phillips	440y, 880y	London University	
Clive Roberts	Javelin throw	Swansea AC	
Bob Shaw	120y, 440y hurdles	Achilles Club	Bronze medal
Hywel Williams	Discus, Shot put	Roath AC	

=== Boxing ===
Athlete	Events	Notes	Medals
Malcolm Collins	57kg Featherweight	Cardiff Gas	Silver medal

=== Cycling ===
Athlete	Events	Notes	Medals
Malcolm Campbell	Road race, scratch, pursuit, time trial	Cardiff Byways RCC	
Don Skene	Road race, scratch, time trial	Cardiff Byways RCC	Bronze medal
Philip Waring	Road race, scratch, pursuit, time trial	Pontypool RC	

=== Fencing ===
Men

Athlete	Events	Notes	Medals
Ossie Reynolds	Foil, Sabre, Épée	London	

Women

Athlete	Events	Notes	Medals
Aileen Harding	Foil	Cardiff FC	Bronze medal

=== Lawn bowls ===
Athlete	Events	Notes	Medals
Robert Devonald	fours/rinks	Cardiff BC	
Obadiah Hopkins	fours/rinks	Cardiff BC	
Alfred Thomas	singles, fours/rinks	Dafen BC, Llanelli	
Ivor Thomas	fours/rinks	Cardiff BC	

=== Swimming ===
Men

Athlete	Events	Notes	Medals
John Brockway	110y backstroke	Newport SC	Gold medal

Women

Athlete	Events	Notes	Medals
Phyllis Linton	110y, 440y freestyle	Maindee SC, Newport	

=== Weightlifting ===
Athlete	Events	Notes	Medals
Alwyn Evans	90kg, middle-heavyweight	Cardiff	
Ron Jenkins	60kg, featherweight	Darian WC, Aberdare	Bronze medal

== See also ==
- Wales at the Commonwealth Games
