= Vehkonen =

Vehkonen is a surname. Notable people with the surname include:

- Aarne Vehkonen (1927–2011), Finnish weightlifter
- Kalevi Vehkonen (1946–2023), Finnish former professional motocross racer
- Pekka Vehkonen (born 1964), Finnish former professional motocross racer
