= Fernando Louro =

Fernando Louro may refer to:

- Fernando Louro (weightlifter) (born 1922), Cuban weightlifter
- Fernando Louro (cyclist) (born 1962), Brazilian cyclist
