= Proença =

Proença (Portuguese pronunciation: [pɾoˈẽsɐ]) is a Portuguese language surname. It may refer to:

== People ==
- Christophe Proença (born 1966), French politician
- Helder Proença (died 2009), Guinea-Bissauan politician
- João Uva de Matos Proença (1938-1990), Portuguese diplomat
- Maitê Proença (born 1958), Brazilian actress
- Pedro Proença (born 1970), Portuguese football referee
- Raul Proença (1884-1941), Portuguese writer and journalist

== Places ==
- Proença-a-Nova, a municipality in the district of Castelo Branco, Portugal
