= Lennart Nilsson (disambiguation) =

Lennart Nilsson (1922–2017) was a Swedish scientific photographer.

Lennart Nilsson may also refer to:

- Lennart Nilsson (politician) (born 1944), Swedish member of Riksdag from 1976 to 2006
- Lennart Nilsson (footballer) (born 1959), Swedish midfielder and striker

== See also ==
- Lennart Nilsson Award, scientific photography award founded in 1998
- Lennart Nelson (1918–2006), Swedish Olympic weightlifter in 1948
