= Lon bin Mohamed Noor =

Singaporean weightlifter (born 1921)

Personal information
- Nationality: Singaporean
- Born: 1921

Sport
- Sport: Weightlifting

Lon bin Mohamed Noor (born 1921) was a Singaporean weightlifter. He competed in the men's bantamweight event at the 1952 Summer Olympics.
