= Ron Jenkins (weightlifter) =

Welsh weightlifter (1929–2005)

Personal information
- Nationality: British (Welsh)
- Born: Ronald Lyndhurst Jenkins; 3 January 1929 Aberdare, Wales
- Died: 25 September 2005 (aged 76) Merthyr Tydfil, Wales

Sport
- Sport: Weightlifting
- Event: Featherweight/Lightweight
- Club: Darian WC, Aberdare
Medal record
Weightlifting
Representing (Wales)
British Empire & Commonwealth Games
Bronze medal – third place	1954 Vancouver	60kg, featherweight

Ronald Lyndhurst Jenkins (3 January 1929 – 25 September 2005) was a Welsh weightlifter who won a bronze medal at the 1954 British Empire and Commonwealth Games (now Commonwealth Games).

== Biography ==
Jenkins won a bronze medal for Welsh team in the 60kg, featherweight competition at the 1954 British Empire and Commonwealth Games in Vancouver, Canada. He lifted 615lb combined (180lb press, 190lb snatch and 245lb jerk) to secure the medal.

In November 1955 he took part in the 'Cavalcade of Sport', which was a fundraising event for the British Empire and Commonwealth Games (1958) Fund and National Sports Development Fund.

He was selected for the Welsh team again at a second British Empire and Commonwealth Games and duly participated at his home games in Cardiff in the lightweight category, where he finished in 8th place.

In 1960 he was the current Welsh champion and former British champion, competing for Darian Weightlifting Club of Aberdare.

Jenkins died in Merthyr Tydfil, Wales on 25 September 2005, aged 76.
