= Nasser Mirghavami =

Iranian weightlifter

Nasr Sayed Mir Ghavami
Personal information
- Full name: Nasr Sayed Mir Ghavami Aladdin
- Nationality: Iranian
- Died: before 2012

Sport
- Sport: Weightlifting

Nasr Sayed Mir Ghavami Aladdin (Persian: ناصر میرقوامی; died before 2012) was an Iranian weightlifter. He competed in the men's middleweight event at the 1948 Summer Olympics. died before 2012.
