= Sydney Harrington =

British weightlifter

Personal information
- Nationality: British (English)
- Born: 16 November 1926 Wolverhampton, England
- Died: 4 May 2005 (aged 78) Wolverhampton, England

Sport
- Sport: Weightlifting
- Event: Light-heavyweight
- Club: Wolverhampton

Sydney Harrington (16 November 1926 – 4 May 2005) was a male weightlifter who competed for Great Britain in the weightlifting at the 1956 Summer Olympics.

== Biography ==
Harrington represented the English team at the 1954 British Empire and Commonwealth Games held in Vancouver, Canada, where he participated in the light-heavyweight category. At the 1956 Olympic Games in Melbourne, Harrington participated in the middle-heavyweight class.
