= Fritz Mast =

Swiss weightlifter

Personal information
- Nationality: Swiss
- Born: 16 February 1912; Königsberg, Germany
- Died: 25 October 1976 (aged 64); Munich, Germany

Sport
- Sport: Weightlifting

Fritz Mast (16 February 1912 – 25 October 1976) was a Swiss weightlifter. He competed in the men's middleweight event at the 1948 Summer Olympics.
