= Toni Leuthe =

German weightlifter

Personal information
- Nationality: German
- Born: 21 November 1922; Singen, Germany
- Died: 2008 (aged 86)

Sport
- Sport: Weightlifting

Toni Leuthe (21 November 1922 – 2008) was a German weightlifter. He competed in the men's lightweight event at the 1952 Summer Olympics.
