= Pierre Bouladou =

French weightlifter (1925–2022)

Personal information
- Nationality: French
- Born: 18 November 1925; Montpellier, France
- Died: 29 December 2022 (aged 97); Montpellier, France

Sport
- Sport: Weightlifting

Pierre Bouladou (18 November 1925 – 29 December 2022) was a French weightlifter. He competed in the men's middleweight event at the 1948 Summer Olympics. Bouladou died in Montpellier on 29 December 2022, at the age of 97.
