= Ernest Peppiatt =

English weightlifter (1917–1979)

Personal information
- Nationality: British (English)
- Born: Ernest James Peppiatt; 27 July 1917 St. Pancras, London, England
- Died: 4 September 1979 (aged 62) Matangi, Waikato, New Zealand

Sport
- Sport: Weightlifting
- Event: Middleweight
- Club: Kentish Town Weightlifting Club

Ernest James Peppiatt (27 July 1917 – 4 September 1979) was a British weightlifter. He competed at the 1948 Summer Olympics for Great Britain.

== Biography ==
At the 1948 Olympic Games in London, Peppiatt competed in the men's middleweight event.

He represented the English team at the 1950 British Empire Games in Auckland, New Zealand, where he finished 5th in the middleweight 75 kg division.

Peppiatt was a member of the Kentish Town Weightlifting Club, where he would later become a coach. This led to him also becoming the weightlifting coach to the British team for Tokyo Olympics in 1964.
