= Théophile Huyge =

Belgian weightlifter (born 1920)

Personal information
- Full name: Theofiel Gustaaf Huyge
- Nationality: Belgian
- Born: 8 November 1920 Sint-Amandsberg, Belgium

Sport
- Sport: Weightlifting

Theofiel Gustaaf Huyge (born 8 November 1920, date of death unknown) was a Belgian weightlifter. He competed in the men's lightweight event at the 1948 Summer Olympics.
