= Roy Gearry =

New Zealand cricketer (1946–2025)

Personal information
- Full name: Roy Malcolm Gearry
- Born: 18 December 1946; Christchurch, New Zealand
- Died: 14 December 2025 (aged 78); Christchurch, New Zealand
- Batting: Right-handed
- Bowling: Right-arm medium
- Relatives: George Gearry (father)

Domestic team information
- Years: Team
- 1964/65–1965/66: Canterbury
- 1969/70–1970/71: Central Districts
- 1973/74: Canterbury

Career statistics
| Competition | FC | List A |
|---|---|---|
| Matches | 11 | 1 |
| Runs scored | 234 | 0 |
| Batting average | 18.00 | 0.00 |
| 100s/50s | 0/1 | 0/0 |
| Top score | 59 | 0 |
| Balls bowled | 168 | 24 |
| Wickets | 0 | 0 |
| Bowling average | – | – |
| 5 wickets in innings | – | – |
| 10 wickets in match | – | – |
| Best bowling | – | – |
| Catches/stumpings | 4/– | 0/– |
- Source: Cricinfo, 27 December 2025

Roy Malcolm Gearry (18 December 1946 – 14 December 2025) was a New Zealand cricketer who played 11 games of first-class cricket for Canterbury and Central Districts between 1964 and 1973.

Gearry was born in Christchurch, where he attended Shirley Boys' High School. A hard-hitting middle-order batsman, he was the highest scorer in senior Christchurch cricket in the early rounds of the 1964–65 season, and was added to the Canterbury Plunket Shield squad while still only 17 years old. His highest first-class score was 59 for Canterbury in a 10-wicket victory over Northern Districts in his last first-class match in December 1973.

His father George Gearry played for Canterbury in the 1950s. Both father and son were renowned for their big hitting; in the 1973–74 Christchurch senior club season Roy was the top six-hitter, with eleven.

Gearry and his wife Denise had two sons. He died at his home in Christchurch in December 2025, aged 78.
