= Gonzalo Alvarado =

Peruvian weightlifter

Personal information
- Nationality: Peruvian

Sport
- Sport: Weightlifting

Gonzalo Alvarado Cornejo was a Peruvian weightlifter. He competed in the men's lightweight event at the 1948 Summer Olympics.
