= Jørgen Fryd Petersen =

Danish weightlifter (1925–1988)

Personal information
- Nationality: Danish
- Born: 19 July 1925 Copenhagen, Denmark
- Died: 28 February 1988 (aged 62) Copenhagen, Denmark

Sport
- Sport: Weightlifting

Jørgen Fryd Petersen (19 July 1925 – 28 February 1988) was a Danish weightlifter. He competed in the men's lightweight event at the 1948 Summer Olympics.
