= Ron Eland =

South African weightlifter

Personal information
- Nationality: South African
- Born: 28 February 1923 Port Elizabeth, South Africa
- Died: 12 February 2003 (aged 79) Cape Town, South Africa

Sport
- Sport: Weightlifting

William Ronald Eland (28 February 1923 – 12 February 2003) was a South African weightlifter. He competed in the men's lightweight event at the 1948 Summer Olympics, representing Great Britain.

== Life ==
Prior to weight-lifting Eland worked as a schoolteacher.

Ron Eland visited the Apollo School of Weightlifting, also known as Milo Academy. He was mentored by the founder of the academy, Milo Pillay, who was a famous South African weightlifter.

During the 1940s, two championships were annually held in South Africa with black only and white only divisions. As a black man, Eland could not participate in the white division, governed by the South African Amateur Weightlifting Association, only in the amateur championships of the Eastern Province Non-European Weightlifting Association.

In 1947, Pillay tried to send a selection of boxers, wrestlers, weightlifters and athletes to the Olympic Games in London, which included Eland. In 1948, Eland was denied a place as a weight-lifter in South Africa's team, despite lifting more than a white man picked for the team, because of the colour of his skin. Eland's athletic association contacted the British Amateur Weight-Lifting Association and asked if he could presented Britain. The British Association agreed and arranged a series of concerts and galas to fund Eland's seven-month trip to Britain.

In May 1948, Eland won the British lightweight championship with a lift of 672 pounds. In June 1948, with the support of Tromp van Diggelen, the founder of the British Amateur Weight-Lifting Association, Eland become the first South African to represent Britain in weightlifting at the 1948 Olympic Games. Partway through the games, Eland contracted appendicitis and as a result he was unable to complete his lifts.

Eland briefly coached Precious McKenzie who also competed for Great Britain.

In 1976, after emigrating to North America, Eland served as the technical coach for the Canadian weightlifting team at the 1976 Summer Olympics and the 1978 Commonwealth Games.

In 2007, Eland was posthumously inducted into the South African Sports Hall of Fame.

== Death ==
William Ron Eland died on February 12, 2003, while on a visit in Cape Town, South Africa.
