= Yorrie Evans =

Welsh weightlifter

Personal information
- Nationality: British (Welsh)
- Born: 16 April 1923 Llansteffan, Wales
- Died: 31 October 2003 (aged 80) Pembroke, Wales
- Weight: 68 kg (150 lb)

Sport
- Sport: Weightlifting
- Event: Middleweight

William Iorwerth Evans (16 April 1923 – 31 October 2003) was a weightlifter from Wales who competed at the 1952 Summer Olympics..

== Biography ==
At the 1952 Olympic Games in Helsinki, Evans competed in the men's lightweight event.

Evans won the 1955 Welsh national title and represented the 1958 Welsh team at the 1958 British Empire and Commonwealth Games in Cardiff, Wales, where he participated in the 75kg middleweight category category.
