= Robert Higgins (weightlifter) =

American weightlifter (1925–1998)

Personal information
- Born: March 25, 1925 Bloomington, Indiana, U.S.
- Died: September 4, 1998 (aged 73) Indianapolis, Indiana, U.S.
- Height: 5 ft 3 in (1.60 m)
- Weight: 132 lb (60 kg)

Sport
- Country: United States
- Sport: Weightlifting
- Weight class: 60 kg
- Team: National team
Medal record
Men's Weightlifting
Representing United States
World Championships
| Gold medal – first place | 1947 Philadelphia | 60 kg |
- Updated on 6 October 2016

Robert E. Higgins (March 25, 1925 – September 4, 1998) was an American weightlifter, who competed in the featherweight class and represented United States at international competitions. He won the gold medal at the 1947 World Weightlifting Championships in the 60 kg category. He was from Indianapolis, Indiana and owned and managed a gym there. He died in 1998 at the age of 73.
