= René Aleman =

French weightlifter

Personal information
- Nationality: French
- Born: 23 November 1913; El Biar, French Algeria
- Died: 1989 (aged 75–76); Toulon, France

Sport
- Sport: Weightlifting

René Aleman (23 November 1913 – 1989) was a French weightlifter. He competed in the men's lightweight event at the 1948 Summer Olympics.

== Personal life ==
Aleman enlisted in the French Armed Forces in 1936. During the Second World War, he was captured by German forces in June 1940 in the Battle of France, but escaped custody two years later.
