= Augustyn Dziedzic =

Polish weightlifter

Personal information
- Nationality: Polish
- Born: 31 January 1928 Cięcina, Poland
- Died: 5 May 2008 (aged 80) Warsaw, Poland

Sport
- Sport: Weightlifting

Augustyn Dziedzic (31 January 1928 – 5 May 2008) was a Polish weightlifter. He competed in the men's bantamweight event at the 1952 Summer Olympics.
