= Joe Sklar =

Canadian weightlifter (1917–2008)

Personal information
- Full name: Joseph Sklar
- Nationality: Canadian
- Born: 18 May 1917
- Died: 26 January 2008 (aged 90) Toronto, Ontario, Canada

Sport
- Sport: Weightlifting

Joseph Sklar (18 May 1917 – 26 January 2008) was a Canadian weightlifter. He competed in the men's middleweight event at the 1948 Summer Olympics. Sklar died in Toronto on 26 January 2008, at the age of 90.
