= Giuseppe Colantuono =

Italian weightlifter (1928–2025)

Giuseppe Colantuono-Balzano
Personal information
- Nationality: Italian
- Born: 26 November 1928 Torre del Greco, Italy
- Died: 7 February 2025 (aged 96)

Sport
- Sport: Weightlifting

Giuseppe Colantuono (26 November 1928 – 7 February 2025) was an Italian weightlifter. He competed in the men's lightweight event at the 1948 Summer Olympics. He died on 7 February 2025, at the age of 96.
