= Obadiah Hopkins =

Welsh lawn bowler

Personal information
- Nationality: British (Welsh)
- Born: January 1879 Cardiff, Wales
- Died: 7 November 1955 (aged 76) Cardiff, Wales

Sport
- Sport: Lawn bowls
- Club: Fairoak BC, Cardiff

Obediah Hopkins (January 1879 - 7 November 1955), was a Welsh international lawn bowler who competed at the British Empire and Commonwealth Games (now Commonwealth Games).

== Biography ==
Hopkins was an accountant by trade and lived at 96 Roath Court Road in Cardiff and was a member of the Fairoak Bowling Club of Cardiff. He made his Welsh international debut in 1925 In 1950 he was the secretary of the Glamorgan County Bowls Association.

He represented the 1954 Welsh team at the 1954 British Empire and Commonwealth Games in Vancouver, Canada in the fours/rinks event with Robert Devonald, Alfred Thomas and Ivor Thomas.

He died in 1955.
