= Bjørn Heyn =

Norwegian weightlifter

Personal information
- Nationality: Norwegian
- Born: 18 November 1928; Larvik, Norway
- Died: 28 March 2015 (aged 86)

Sport
- Sport: Weightlifting

Bjørn Heyn (18 November 1928 – 28 March 2015) was a Norwegian weightlifter. He competed in the men's lightweight event at the 1952 Summer Olympics.
