= Alwyn Evans =

Welsh weightlifter

Personal information
- Nationality: British (Welsh)
- Born: 1930 Merthyr Tydfil, Wales
- Died: 2005 Glamorgan, Wales

Sport
- Sport: Weightlifting
- Event: Middle-heavyweight
- Club: Cardiff/Aberdare

Alwyn Anthony Evans (1930 – 2005) was a weightlifter from Wales, who competed at two Commonwealth Games.

== Biography ==
Evans resided in Cardiff, when he represented the 1954 Welsh team at the 1954 British Empire and Commonwealth Games in Vancouver, Canada, where he participated in the 90kg middle-heavyweight category.

Evans won the 1955 Welsh national title, lifting for Aberdare and in March 1958, participated in the Welsh Olympic Championships and Empire Games trials and was one of the 7 athletes (out of 26) that was short-listed for the Games.

Evans subsequently went to a second Games and represented the 1958 Welsh team at the 1958 British Empire and Commonwealth Games in Cardiff, Wales, where he participated in the 90kg middle-heavyweight category, finishing in fifth place.

Evans was also the 1961 Welsh national champion and a British champion.
