= Juan Russo =

Argentine weightlifter

Personal information
- Nationality: Argentine
- Born: 6 August 1926
- Died: 12 November 2016 (aged 90)

Sport
- Sport: Weightlifting

Juan Russo (6 August 1926 – 12 November 2016) was an Argentine weightlifter. He competed in the men's middleweight event at the 1948 Summer Olympics.
