= Ivor Thomas (bowls) =

Welsh lawn bowler

Personal information
- Nationality: British (Welsh)
- Born: 20 January 1885 Ystalyfera, Wales
- Died: 26 April 1965 (aged 80) Wales

Sport
- Sport: Lawn bowls
- Club: Cardiff BC

Albert Ivor Thomas (20 January 1885 – 26 April 1965), was a Welsh international lawn bowler who competed at the British Empire and Commonwealth Games (now Commonwealth Games).

== Biography ==
Thomas was a bank manager by trade and in 1939 lived at Elm Terrace in Ogmore Vale.

In 1954 he was living at Heath Park Avenue in Cardiff and represented the 1954 Welsh team at the 1954 British Empire and Commonwealth Games in Vancouver, Canada in the fours/rinks event, with Robert Devonald, Obadiah Hopkins and Alfred Thomas.

Thomas also represented the Cardiff Municipal Bowling Association.
