= Robert Devonald =

Welsh lawn bowler

Personal information
- Nationality: British (Welsh)
- Born: 2 February 1886 Pendoylan, Wales
- Died: 17 January 1965 (aged 78) Cardiff, Wales

Sport
- Sport: Lawn bowls
- Club: Cardiff BC

Robert Stuart Devonald (2 February 1887 - 17 January 1965), was a Welsh international lawn bowler who competed at the British Empire and Commonwealth Games (now Commonwealth Games).

== Biography ==
Devonald was a teacher by trade and lived in Westville Road, Cardiff and was a member of the Cardiff Bowls Club.

He represented the 1954 Welsh team at the 1954 British Empire and Commonwealth Games in Vancouver, Canada in the fours/rinks event, with Obadiah Hopkins, Alfred Thomas and Ivor Thomas.

He was selected for the 1956 tour of the United States.
