= Josef Schuster (weightlifter) =

German weightlifter

Personal information
- Nationality: German
- Born: 13 December 1906; Grafing, Germany
- Died: 1996 (aged 89–90)

Sport
- Sport: Weightlifting

Josef Schuster (13 December 1906 – 1996) was a German weightlifter. He competed in the men's bantamweight event at the 1952 Summer Olympics.
