= Orlando Chaves (weightlifter) =

Guyanese weightlifter

Personal information
- Nationality: Guyanese
- Born: 2 March 1921
- Died: September 1976; London, England

Sport
- Sport: Weightlifting

Orlando Chaves (2 March 1921 – September 1976) was a Guyanese weightlifter. He competed in the men's middleweight event at the 1948 Summer Olympics.
