= William Watson (weightlifter) =

British weightlifter

Personal information
- Nationality: British
- Born: 1 July 1918; Lewisham, England
- Died: 4 November 1998 (aged 80); Essex, England

Sport
- Sport: Weightlifting

William George Watson (1 July 1918 – 4 November 1998) was a British weightlifter. He competed in the men's middleweight event at the 1948 Summer Olympics.
