= Klement Schuh =

Austrian weightlifter (1916–1995)

Personal information
- Full name: Klement August Schuh
- Nationality: Austrian
- Born: 13 June 1916 Ternitz, Austria
- Died: 18 August 1995 (aged 79) Villach, Austria

Sport
- Sport: Weightlifting

Klement August Schuh (13 June 1916 – 18 August 1995) was an Austrian weightlifter. He competed in the men's middleweight event at the 1948 Summer Olympics. Schuh died in Villach on 18 August 1995, at the age of 79.
