= Jim McIntosh (weightlifter) =

Scottish athlete

Personal information
- Nationality: British (Scottish)

Sport
- Sport: Weightlifting
- Event: Lightweight
- Club: Troon

Jim McIntosh was a weightlifter from Scotland who competed at the 1954 British Empire and Commonwealth Games (now Commonwealth Games).

== Biography ==
McIntosh was educated at Jordanhill College He was the 1952 Scottish champion at lightweight.

McIntosh won his second and third Scottish titles in 1953 and 1954 respectively and also broke the Scottish record by lifting 725lb.

He represented the Scottish Empire Games team at the 1954 British Empire and Commonwealth Games in Vancouver, Canada, participating in the 67.5 kg lightweight category, where he finished in sixth place behind Australian Vern Barberis.

After the Games, McIntosh asked his wife to sell the house in Troon and join him in Canada with their son.
