= Julio Bonnet =

Argentine weightlifter (born c. 1925)

Personal information
- Full name: Julio César Bonnet
- Nationality: Argentine
- Born: 6 September 1925
- Died: 28 July 1995 (aged 69)

Sport
- Sport: Weightlifting

Julio Bonnet (6 September 1925 – 28 July 1995) was an Argentine weightlifter. He competed in the men's middleweight event at the 1948 Summer Olympics.
