= Alfonso Canti =

Italian weightlifter

Personal information
- Nationality: Italian
- Born: 21 July 1920; Sampierdarena, Italy
- Died: 4 June 1996 (aged 75)

Sport
- Sport: Weightlifting

Alfonso Canti (21 July 1920 – 4 June 1996) was an Italian weightlifter. He competed in the men's lightweight event at the 1952 Summer Olympics.
