= Juhani Vellamo =

Finnish weightlifter (1912–2004)

Personal information
- Born: 4 April 1912 Jämijärvi, Finland
- Died: 22 May 2004 (aged 92) Tampere, Finland

Sport
- Country: Finland
- Sport: Weightlifting
- Weight class: 82.5 kg
- Team: National team
Medal record
Men's Weightlifting
Representing Finland
World Championships
Bronze medal – third place	1947 Philadelphia	82.5 kg
- Updated on 6 October 2016

Juhani Vellamo (4 April 1912 – 22 May 2004) was a Finnish male former weightlifter, who competed in the light heavyweight class and represented Finland at international competitions. He won the bronze medal at the 1947 World Weightlifting Championships in the 82.5 kg category. He also competed at the 1948 Summer Olympics and the 1952 Summer Olympics.
