= Václav Bečvář (weightlifter) =

Czech weightlifter (1908–1978)

Personal information
- Born: 17 September 1908 České Budějovice, Bohemia, Austria-Hungary
- Died: 1978 (aged 69–70)

Sport
- Country: Czechoslovakia
- Sport: Weightlifting
- Weight class: +82.5 kg
- Team: National team
Medal record
Men's Weightlifting
Representing Czechoslovakia
World Championships
Bronze medal – third place	1947 Philadelphia	+82.5 kg
- Updated on 8 October 2016

Václav Bečvář (17 September 1908 – 1978) was a Czech male weightlifter, who competed in the heavyweight class and represented Czechoslovakia at international competitions. He won the bronze medal at the 1947 World Weightlifting Championships in the +82.5 kg category. He also competed at the 1936 Summer Olympics.
