= Hugo Banda =

Mexican weightlifter (1916–1970)

Personal information
- Born: October 2, 1916; Puebla, Mexico
- Died: July 4, 1970 (aged 53); Álvaro Obregón, Mexico

Sport
- Sport: Weightlifting

Hugo Banda Bernal (2 October 1916 – 4 July 1970) was a Mexican weightlifter. He competed in the men's lightweight event at the 1948 Summer Olympics.
