= Salvador Lo Presti =

Argentine weightlifter (1922–2014)

Personal information
- Nationality: Argentine
- Born: 17 August 1922
- Died: 3 January 2014 (aged 91)

Sport
- Sport: Weightlifting

Salvador Lo Presti (17 August 1922 – 3 January 2014) was an Argentine weightlifter. He competed in the men's lightweight event at the 1948 Summer Olympics.
