= Frank Cope (weightlifter) =

English weightlifter (1928–2012)

Personal information
- Nationality: British (English)
- Born: 8 December 1928 London, England
- Died: 5 November 2012 (aged 83) Teignmouth, England

Sport
- Sport: Weightlifting
- Event: Bantamweight
- Club: London
Medal record
Weightlifting
Representing England
British Empire & Commonwealth Games
| Silver medal – second place | 1954 Vancouver | -56kg combined |

Frank Albert Cope (8 December 1928 – 5 November 2012) was an English male weightlifter.

== Biography ==
Cope represented the English team at the 1954 British Empire and Commonwealth Games held in Vancouver, Canada, where he won the silver medal in the bantamweight category.
