= Antonio Hoffmann =

Puerto Rican weightlifter

Personal information
- Nationality: Puerto Rican
- Born: 8 December 1929; Ponce, Puerto Rico
- Died: 29 April 2006 (aged 76); Puerto Rico

Sport
- Sport: Weightlifting

José Antonio Hoffmann Reyes (8 December 1929 – 29 April 2006) was a Puerto Rican weightlifter. He competed in the men's lightweight event at the 1952 Summer Olympics.
