= Asadollah Mahini =

Iranian weightlifter (born 1918)

Personal information
- Full name: Asadollah Tehrani Mihani
- Nationality: Iranian
- Born: 21 May 1918
- Died: before 2012

Sport
- Sport: Weightlifting

Asadollah Tehrani Mihani (Persian: اسدالله مهینی; 21 May 1918 – before 2012) was an Iranian weightlifter. He competed in the men's lightweight event at the 1948 Summer Olympics. Mahini died before 2012.
