= Alexandru Cosma =

Romanian weightlifter (1926–2002)

Personal information
- Nationality: Romanian
- Born: 21 February 1926 Bucharest, Romania
- Died: August 2002 (aged 76) Romania

Sport
- Sport: Weightlifting

Alexandru Cosma (21 February 1926 – August 2002) was a Romanian weightlifter. He competed in the men's bantamweight event at the 1952 Summer Olympics. Cosma died in Romania in October 2002, at the age of 76.
