= Alfred Thomas (bowls) =

Welsh lawn bowler

Personal information
- Nationality: British (Welsh)
- Born: 21 September 1899 Wales
- Died: unknown

Sport
- Sport: Lawn bowls
- Club: Dafen Bowls Club
Medal record
Representing Wales
National Championships
Gold medal – first place	1937	singles
Gold medal – first place	1950	Singles
Gold medal – first place	1947	fours

Alfred Thomas also known as Fred Thomas (21 September 1899 - date of death unknown), was a Welsh international lawn bowler who competed at the British Empire and Commonwealth Games (now Commonwealth Games).

== Biography ==
Thomas was a farmer, butcher and cattle dealer by trade and lived at Pwllbach Farm in Dafen, Carmarthenshire and was a member of the Dafen Bowls Club, near Llanelli. He made his Welsh international debut in 1946.

Thomas represented the 1954 Welsh team at the 1954 British Empire and Commonwealth Games in Vancouver, Canada in both the fours/rinks event with Robert Devonald, Obadiah Hopkins and Ivor Thomas (as skip) and the singles event, where he finished in fifth place.

Thomas was a three-times champion of Wales having won the singles in 1937 and 1950 and fours in 1947.
