= La See-yun =

South Korean weightlifter

Personal information
- Nationality: South Korean

Sport
- Sport: Weightlifting

La See-yun was a South Korean weightlifter. He competed in the men's lightweight event at the 1948 Summer Olympics.
