= Tauno Suoniemi =

Finnish weightlifter

Personal information
- Nationality: Finnish
- Born: 4 December 1927; Nokia, Finland
- Died: 22 July 1985 (aged 57); Tampere, Finland

Sport
- Sport: Weightlifting

Tauno Suoniemi (4 December 1927 – 22 July 1985) was a Finnish weightlifter. He competed in the men's lightweight event at the 1952 Summer Olympics.
