= Ivan Udodov =

Russian weightlifter (1924–1981)

Personal information
- Born: 20 May 1924 Gluboky, Donetsk Governorate, Ukrainian SSR, Soviet Union
- Died: 16 October 1981 (aged 57) Rostov-on-Don, Russian SFSR, Soviet Union

Sport
- Sport: Weightlifting
- Club: Dynamo Rostov-on-Don
Medal record
Representing the Soviet Union
Olympic Games
Gold medal – first place	1952 Helsinki	-56 kg
World Championships
Gold medal – first place	1953 Stockholm	-56 kg
Silver medal – second place	1954 Wien	-60 kg
Silver medal – second place	1955 Munich	-60 kg

Ivan Vasilevich Udodov (Russian: Иван Васильевич Удодов; 20 May 1924 – 16 October 1981) was a Russian weightlifter who won an Olympic gold medal in 1952 and a world title in 1953, both in the bantamweight category (−56 kg). He then moved to the featherweight (−60 kg) class and won silver medals at the world championships of 1954 and 1955. In 1952–54 Udodov set four world records: one in the press, one in the snatch, and two in the total.

== Career ==
In 1941, when Udodov was 17, he was captured by the Germans and deported to the Buchenwald concentration camp. When he was freed in 1945, he weighed about 30 kg and could not walk on his own. He took up weightlifting to recover his strength, and already in 1949 finished second at the Soviet bantamweight championships. He won the national bantamweight title in 1950–1952. In 1954 Udodov switched to featherweight, and set two world records, but was less successful in competitions, and won only one national title in this division, in 1956. The same year he was not selected to the Olympic team due to an injury. He retired from competitions to become a truck driver and later a weightlifting coach in Rostov.
