= Les Neal =

Australian rules footballer, born 1913

Personal information
- Full name: Leslie Herbert Neal
- Born: 12 September 1913; Bairnsdale, Victoria
- Died: 23 January 1990 (aged 76); Seaford, Victoria
- Original team: Yarraville
- Height: 180 cm (5 ft 11 in)
- Weight: 75 kg (165 lb)

Playing career^{1}
Years	Club	Games (Goals)
1942	Footscray	1 (3)
- ^{1} Playing statistics correct to the end of 1942.

Leslie Herbert Neal (12 September 1913 – 23 January 1990) was an Australian rules footballer who played with Footscray in the Victorian Football League (VFL).

Neal enlisted shortly after his one senior game with Footscray, and served in the Royal Australian Air Force from 1942 to 1946.
