= Edmund Hood =

Australian rules footballer

Personal information
- Full name: Edmund Gerald Hood
- Born: 29 April 1898; Richmond, Victoria
- Died: 4 January 1990 (aged 91)
- Original team: St Ignatius / Xavier College

Playing career^{1}
Years	Club	Games (Goals)
1916–19	Richmond	10 (4)
- ^{1} Playing statistics correct to the end of 1919.

Edmund Gerald Hood (29 April 1898 – 4 January 1990) was an Australian rules footballer who played with Richmond in the Victorian Football League (VFL).
