= Jimmy McIntosh (baseball) =

American baseball player

- Third baseman

Negro league baseball debut
- 1937, for the Detroit Stars

Last appearance
- 1937, for the Detroit Stars

Teams
- Detroit Stars (1937)

James McIntosh is an American former Negro league third baseman who played in the 1930s.

McIntosh played for the Detroit Stars in 1937. In three recorded games, he went hitless in five plate appearances.
