= Rosaire Smith =

Canadian weightlifter (1914–1999)

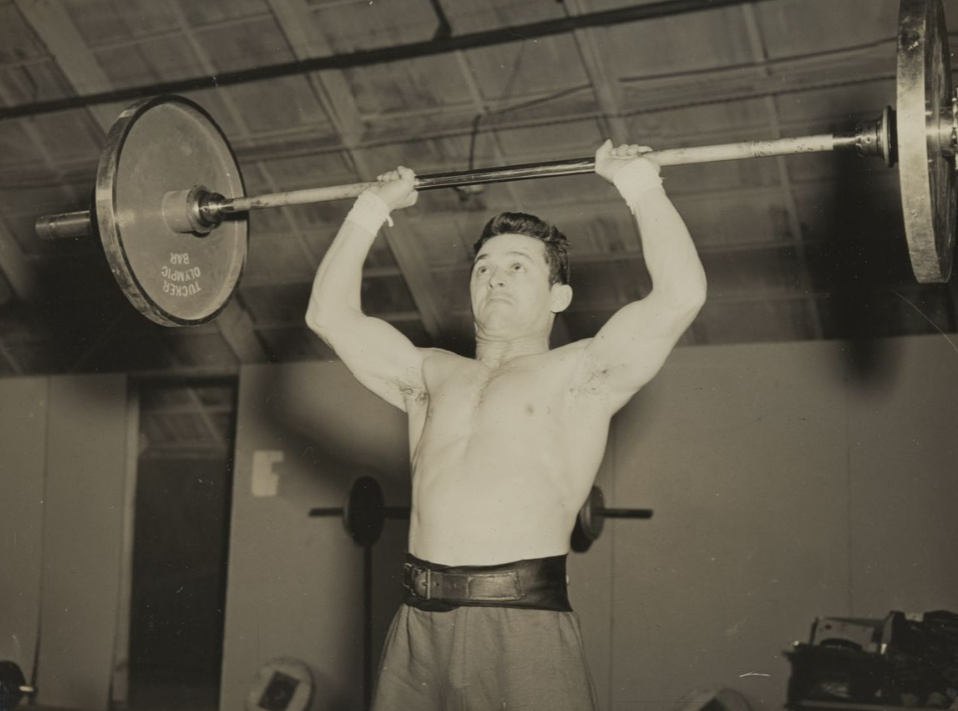
- Rosaire Smith winning silver Auckland Libraries Heritage Collections

Personal information
- Born: 9 January 1914 Saint-Rosaire-d'Arthabaska, Quebec, Canada
- Died: 6 April 1999 (aged 85) Drummondville, Quebec, Canada

Sport
- Sport: Weightlifting
- Weight class: 59 kg
- Team: National team
Medal record
Men's Weightlifting
Representing Canada
World Championships
Bronze medal – third place	1947 Philadelphia	59 kg
British Empire Games
Silver medal – second place	1950 Auckland	-56kg

Rosaire Smith (9 January 1914 – 6 April 1999) was a Canadian weightlifter, who competed in the bantamweight class and represented Canada at international competitions. He won the bronze medal at the 1947 World Weightlifting Championships in the 59 kg category. He also competed at the 1948 Summer Olympics and the 1952 Summer Olympics.
