= Julian Creus =

British weightlifter (1917–1992)

Personal information
- Nationality: British (English)
- Born: Julian Gerard Creus; 30 June 1917 Liverpool, England
- Died: 9 September 1992 (aged 75) Granville, New South Wales, Australia

Sport
- Sport: Wrestling
- Event(s): Bantamweight; Featherweight
Medal record
Weightlifting
Representing Great Britain
Olympic Games
Silver medal – second place	1948 London	-56 kg
Representing England
British Empire Games
Silver medal – second place	1950 Auckland	60 kg

Julian Gerard Creus (30 June 1917 – 9 September 1992) was a British weightlifter who competed at three Olympic Games.

== Biography ==
Creus was born in Liverpool on 30 June 1917. His father, Barcelona-born Julio José Pedro Creus, had been killed two months earlier on 21 April when the ship on which he was serving, S.S. Pontiac, was attacked by a U-Boat. The Commonwealth War Graves record shows that at the time the family were living at 59 Kent Street in the Toxteth area of Liverpool. He competed for Great Britain in the 1948 Summer Olympics held in London in the bantamweight event where he finished in second place. He competed at both the 1952 Summer Olympics in Helsinki and 1956 Summer Olympics in Melbourne both at featherweight finishing ninth and equal eleventh respectively.

He represented the English team at the 1950 British Empire Games in Auckland, New Zealand, where he won the silver medal in the featherweight event.

Creus died in Granville, New South Wales on 9 September 2025, at the age of 75.
