= Maurice Megennis =

British weightlifter (1929–2020)

Personal information
- Nationality: British (English)
- Born: 16 November 1929 West Ham, London, England
- Died: 4 August 2020 (aged 90) Leeds, England

Sport
- Sport: Weightlifting
- Event(s): Bantamweight; Featherweight
- Club: Leeds
Medal record
Weightlifting
Representing England
British Empire Games
Gold medal – first place	1954 Vancouver	-56kg

Maurice Edward Megennis (16 November 1929 – 4 August 2020) was a male weightlifter who competed at two Olympic Games.

== Biography ==
Megennis was born in London but lived in Leeds. He competed in the 1952 and 1956 Olympic Games.

He represented the English team at the 1950 British Empire Games in Auckland, New Zealand, where he finished fourth in the bantamweight category.

Four years later, Megennis represented the English team at the 1954 British Empire and Commonwealth Games held in Vancouver, Canada, where he won the gold medal in the bantamweight category.
