= George Espeut =

Jamaican weightlifter (1917–1991)

Personal information
- Born: 8 December 1917; Kingston, Colony of Jamaica, British Empire
- Died: 28 December 1991 (aged 74); Kingston, Jamaica

Sport
- Sport: Weightlifting

George Espeut (8 December 1917 – 28 December 1991) was a Jamaican weightlifter. He competed in the men's lightweight event at the 1948 Summer Olympics.
