= Issy Bloomberg =

South African weightlifter (1930–2000)

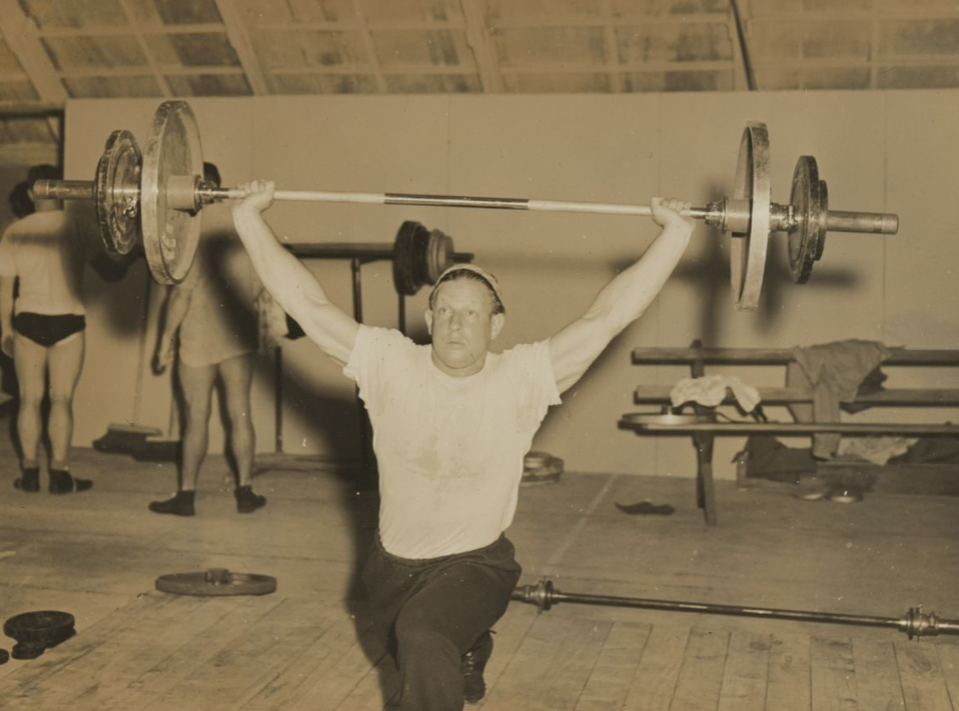
- Bloomberg training in 1950; Auckland Libraries Heritage Collections

Personal information
- Nationality: South African
- Born: 10 February 1930
- Died: 1 December 2000 (aged 70) Cape Town, South Africa

Sport
- Sport: Weightlifting
Medal record
Weightlifting
Representing South Africa
British Empire Games
Silver medal – second place	1950 Auckland	-82.5kg

Isadore Louis Bloomberg (10 February 1930 – 1 December 2000) was a South African weightlifter. He competed at the 1948 Summer Olympics and the 1952 Summer Olympics. His Olympic career was cut short when, after the 1952 Olympics, he lost his amateur status by opening a gym when he returned to South Africa, which the Olympic authorities considered sufficient to make him a professional.
