= Tommy Williams (Australian footballer) =

Australian rules footballer, born 1909

Personal information
- Full name: Tommy Williams
- Born: 12 September 1909
- Died: 14 January 1990 (aged 80)
- Original team: East Brunswick
- Height: 174 cm (5 ft 9 in)
- Weight: 76 kg (168 lb)
- Position: Half-back flank

Playing career^{1}
Years	Club	Games (Goals)
1928–1937	Fitzroy	136 (41)

Coaching career
Years	Club	Games (W–L–D)
1964	Fitzroy	1 (0–1–0)
- ^{1} Playing statistics correct to the end of 1937.

Tommy Williams (12 September 1909 – 14 January 1990) was an Australian rules footballer who played for Fitzroy in the Victorian Football League (VFL).

A half-back flanker, Williams was at Fitzroy during a particularly weak period for the club where they failed to makes the finals in each season he played. The East Brunswick recruit represented the VFL in three interstate matches and later returned to Fitzroy as coach of the under-19s. On one occasion, in 1964, he filled in as coach of the seniors when Kevin Murray was unavailable.
