= Keevil Daly =

Canadian weightlifter (1923–2011)

Personal information
- Born: 21 December 1923 Georgetown, British Guiana
- Died: 28 June 2011 (aged 87) Toronto, Canada

Sport
- Country: British Guiana; Canada
- Sport: Weightlifting
- Weight class: 82.5 kg, 90 kg
Medal record
Men's Weightlifting
Representing British Guiana
World Championships
Silver medal – second place	1947 Philadelphia	82.5 kg
Representing Canada
British Empire and Commonwealth Games
Gold medal – first place	1954 Vancouver	90 kg
- Updated on 22 December 2016

Keevil Daly (21 December 1923 – 28 June 2011) was a male weightlifter, who competed in the light heavyweight and middle heavyweight class and who represented British Guiana, and later Canada, at international competitions. He won the silver medal at the 1947 World Weightlifting Championships in the 82.5 kg category.

As a merchant marine, he survived being torpedoed during World War II on the Canadian ship SS Lady Nelson. After the war, Daly became the first black graduate of Ryerson Polytechnical as a Royal Canadian Air Force serviceman.
