= Cyril Coote =

English cricketer

Personal information
- Full name: Cyril Ernest Coote
- Born: 13 April 1909; Cambridge, Cambridgeshire, England
- Died: 24 January 1990 (aged 80); Cottenham, Cambridgeshire, England
- Batting: Left-handed
- Bowling: Left-arm medium

Domestic team information
- Years: Team
- 1935–1936: Minor Counties
- 1932–1949: Cambridgeshire

Career statistics
Competition	FC
Matches	4
Runs scored	120
Batting average	20.00
100s/50s	–/–
Top score	49
Balls bowled	–
Wickets	–
Bowling average	–
5 wickets in innings	–
10 wickets in match	–
Best bowling	–
Catches/stumpings	1/–
- Source: Cricinfo, 20 July 2010

Cyril Ernest Coote (13 April 1909 – 24 January 1990) was an English cricketer. Coote was a left-handed batsman who bowled left-arm medium pace. He was born at Cambridge, Cambridgeshire.

Coote played most of his cricket for Cambridgeshire in the Minor Counties Championship, where he made his debut for the county against Lincolnshire. From 1932 to 1949, he represented the county in 67 matches, with his final appearance coming against Lincolnshire.

Coote also played first-class cricket, where he represented a combined Minor Counties team, firstly in the 1935 against Cambridge University. He played a further 3 first-class matches for the team, with his final first-class match coming in 1936 against Oxford University. In his 4 first-class matches, he scored 120 runs at a batting average of 20.00, with a high score of 49.

Coote died at Cottenham, Cambridgeshire on 24 January 1990.
