= Attia Hamouda =

Egyptian weightlifter (1914–1992)

Olympic medal record

Representing Egypt

Men's Weightlifting

Olympic Games
Silver medal – second place	1948 London	-67.5 kg

Attia Mohammed Hamouda (Egyptian Arabic: عطيه حموده; 1914–1992) was a lightweight (60-67.5 kg) on the Egyptian weightlifting team at the 1948 Summer Olympics in London. He earned a silver medal for Egypt after lifting a record of 360 kg. He lost to his team mate Ibrahim Shams, who lifted the same weight but was lighter. This was the second time that Egypt accumulated five medals, having also done so at the 1936 Summer Olympics.

== See also ==
- List of Egyptians
