= Peter Tippett (footballer) =

Australian rules footballer (1926–1990)

Personal information
- Full name: Peter Tippett
- Born: 6 October 1926
- Died: 13 January 1990 (aged 63)
- Original team: Kerang
- Height: 183 cm (6 ft 0 in)
- Weight: 78 kg (172 lb)

Playing career^{1}
| Years | Club | Games (Goals) |
| 1945–47 | South Melbourne | 29 (2) |
- ^{1} Playing statistics correct to the end of 1947.

Peter Tippett (6 October 1926 – 13 January 1990) was an Australian rules footballer who played with South Melbourne in the Victorian Football League (VFL).
