= Fernando Louro (weightlifter) =

Cuban weightlifter (born 1922)

Personal information
- Nationality: Cuban
- Born: 1 June 1922

Sport
- Sport: Weightlifting

Fernando Louro (born 1 June 1922) was a Cuban weightlifter. He competed in the men's lightweight event at the 1948 Summer Olympics.
