= George Gearry =

New Zealand cricketer (1923–1990)

Personal information
- Full name: George Neville Gearry
- Born: 17 December 1923; Christchurch, New Zealand
- Died: 4 January 1990 (aged 66); Christchurch, New Zealand
- Batting: Left-handed
- Bowling: Right-arm medium-pace
- Relatives: Roy Gearry (son)

Domestic team information
- Years: Team
- 1953-54 to 1956-57: Canterbury

Career statistics
Competition	First-class
Matches	14
Runs scored	337
Batting average	17.73
100s/50s	0/2
Top score	79
Balls bowled	2136
Wickets	32
Bowling average	26.00
5 wickets in innings	1
10 wickets in match	0
Best bowling	6/32
Catches/stumpings	11/0
- Source: Cricinfo, 4 May 2020

George Neville Gearry (17 December 1923 – 4 January 1990) was a New Zealand cricketer who played first-class cricket for Canterbury from 1953 to 1957.

Gearry served in the New Zealand Expeditionary Force in World War II. In cricket, he was an all-rounder who often opened the bowling, and had the reputation of being "the most spectacular batsman in Canterbury". His highest first-class score was 79 when Canterbury beat Auckland in 1955–56; he also took 4 for 79 in the first innings. His best bowling figures were 6 for 32 in Canterbury's innings victory over Wellington in 1953–54, in his second first-class match.

Gearry died when a car he was driving collided with an oncoming car on the main highway near Culverden in North Canterbury in January 1990. His son Roy, who was in the front passenger seat, was injured.
