= Maria Jacoby =

Luxembourgish painter

- Born: 15 February 1900; Hattersheim am Main, Germany
- Died: 22 January 1990 (aged 89); Rocky River, Ohio, United States
- Occupation: Painter

Maria Jacoby (15 February 1900 – 22 January 1990) was a Luxembourgish painter. Her work was part of the painting event in the art competition at the 1936 Summer Olympics.
