= Lennart Nelson =

Swedish weightlifter

Personal information
- Nationality: Swedish
- Born: 16 August 1918; Västerås, Sweden
- Died: 11 September 2006 (aged 88); Västerås, Sweden

Sport
- Sport: Weightlifting

Lennart Nelson (16 August 1918 – 11 September 2006) was a Swedish Olympic weightlifter. He competed in the men's middleweight event at the 1948 Summer Olympics.
