= Wally Kelly =

Australian rules footballer, born 1914

Personal information
- Full name: Wally Kelly
- Born: 17 January 1914
- Died: 6 January 1990 (aged 75)
- Original team: Tutye
- Height: 179 cm (5 ft 10 in)
- Weight: 76 kg (168 lb)

Playing career^{1}
| Years | Club | Games (Goals) |
| 1933–35, 1938 | Footscray | 22 (3) |
- ^{1} Playing statistics correct to the end of 1938.

Wally Kelly (17 January 1914 – 6 January 1990) was a former Australian rules footballer who played with Footscray in the Victorian Football League (VFL).
