= Leo Connors =

Australian rules footballer

Personal information
- Full name: Leo Connors
- Born: 1 September 1918
- Died: 8 January 1990 (aged 71)
- Original team: St Pat's
- Height: 185 cm (6 ft 1 in)
- Weight: 79 kg (174 lb)

Playing career^{1}
Years	Club	Games (Goals)
1942	Hawthorn	2 (0)
- ^{1} Playing statistics correct to the end of 1942.

Leo Connors (1 September 1918 – 8 January 1990) was an Australian rules footballer who played with Hawthorn in the Victorian Football League (VFL).
