= Barry Engelbrecht =

South African weightlifter

Personal information
- Nationality: South African
- Born: 8 September 1924; Kimberley, South Africa
- Died: November 1982

Sport
- Sport: Weightlifting

Barry Engelbrecht (8 September 1924 – November 1982) was a South African weightlifter. He competed in the men's lightweight event at the 1952 Summer Olympics.

Weight Classes Competed in: Featherweight (60KG), Lightweight (67.5KG),
