= Edward Ścigała =

Polish weightlifter

Personal information
- Nationality: Polish
- Born: 20 February 1926; Piekary, Poland
- Died: 28 January 1990 (aged 63); Piekary, Poland

Sport
- Sport: Weightlifting

Edward Ścigała (20 February 1926 – 28 January 1990) was a Polish weightlifter. He competed in the men's lightweight event at the 1952 Summer Olympics.
