= Ray Magee =

Australian weightlifter (1918–1999)

Personal information
- Nationality: Australian
- Born: 31 January 1918; Erskineville, New South Wales, Australia
- Died: 19 April 1999 (aged 81); Yagoona, New South Wales, Australia

Sport
- Sport: Weightlifting

Raymond Sidney Magee (31 January 1918 – 19 April 1999) was an Australian weightlifter. He competed in the men's heavyweight event at the 1948 Summer Olympics.
