= Josef Tauchner =

Austrian weightlifter (1929–1983)

Personal information
- Nationality: Austrian
- Born: 10 February 1929; Saint Peter, Austria
- Died: 17 July 1983 (aged 54); Vienna, Austria

Sport
- Sport: Weightlifting

Josef Tauchner (10 February 1929 – 17 July 1983) was an Austrian weightlifter. He competed at the 1952 Summer Olympics, the 1956 Summer Olympics and the 1960 Summer Olympics.
