= Aarne Vehkonen =

Finnish weightlifter (1927 - 2011)

Personal information
- Nationality: Finnish
- Born: 16 July 1927; Kajaani, Finland
- Died: 29 March 2011 (aged 83); Kajaani, Finland

Sport
- Sport: Weightlifting

Aarne Vehkonen (16 July 1927 – 29 March 2011) was a Finnish weightlifter. He competed in the men's bantamweight event at the 1952 Summer Olympics.
