= Sigmund Frogn =

Norwegian footballer (1904-1990)

Personal information
- Date of birth: 26 March 1904
- Place of birth: Oslo, Norway
- Date of death: 31 January 1990 (aged 85)
- Position: Forward

International career
Years	Team	Apps	(Gls)
1924	Norway	1	(0)

Sigmund Frogn (26 March 1904 – 31 January 1990) was a Norwegian footballer. He played in one match for the Norway national football team in 1924.
