= Whitey Dienelt =

American basketball player

Personal information
- Born: April 28, 1921 Free City of Danzig
- Died: January 12, 1990 (aged 68) Fort Wayne, Indiana, U.S.
- Listed height: 6 ft 0 in (1.83 m)
- Listed weight: 185 lb (84 kg)

Career information
- High school: New Haven (New Haven, Indiana)
- Playing career: 1946–1947
- Position: Guard

Career history
- 1946–1947: Fort Wayne Zollner Pistons

Johannes Paul "Whitey" Dienelt (April 28, 1921 – January 12, 1990) was an American professional basketball player. He played for the Fort Wayne Zollner Pistons in the National Basketball League for 13 games during the 1946–47 season and averaged 0.8 points per game.
