= Joseph Barnett (weightlifter) =

Welsh weightlifter (1920–1999)

Mel Barnett
Personal information
- Nationality: British (Welsh)
- Born: 3 November 1920 Merthyr Tydfil
- Died: 1999 (aged 78) Glamorgan, Wales

Sport
- Sport: Weightlifting
- Event: Heavyweight
- Club: Gloucester
Medal record
Weightlifting
Representing England
British Empire & Commonwealth Games
| Bronze medal – third place | 1954 Vancouver | -90kg combined |

Joseph Melville Barnett also known as Mel Barnett (3 November 1920 – May 1999), was a Welsh born male weightlifter who competed for England and Wales.

== Biography ==
Barnett was born in Merthyr Tydfil, Wales and served in the British Army. His brother Ivor was killed when the battleship HMS Hood was sunk during World War II.

He became interested in weightlifting while serving with the Army Physical Training Corps (APTC) in Egypt. In 1947 and 1948 he was the British light-heavyweight champion but missed the 1948 Summer Olympics due to injury. He was British heavyweight champion in 1949 and finished third at the Paris World Championships in 1950. At the 1952 Olympic Games in Helsinki, Barnett participated in the middle-heavyweight event.

He represented the English team at the 1954 British Empire and Commonwealth Games held in Vancouver, Canada despite a Welsh team also competing at the Games. He won the bronze medal in the middle heavyweightweight category.

Four years later, he did represent Wales at the 1958 British Empire and Commonwealth Games in the -90 kg Combined division at the 1958 British Empire and Commonwealth Games in Cardiff, Wales. and after leaving the Army he became a pub landlord and later a hotel proprietor.
