= Ernesto Crotti =

Italian ice hockey player

Personal information
- Nationality: Italian
- Born: 18 July 1936; Milan, Italy
- Died: 22 January 1990 (aged 53)

Sport
- Sport: Ice hockey

Ernesto "Tino" Crotti (18 July 1936 – 22 January 1990) was an Italian ice hockey player. He competed in the men's tournament at the 1956 Winter Olympics.
