= Stan Eve =

English cricketer

Personal information
- Full name: Stanley Charles Eve
- Born: 18 December 1925; Stepney, London, England
- Died: 27 January 1990 (aged 64); Havering, Essex, England
- Batting: Right-handed
- Role: Batsman

Domestic team information
- Years: Team
- 1949–1957: Essex

Career statistics
Competition	FC
Matches	32
Runs scored	1,041
Batting average	22.14
100s/50s	1/6
Top score	120
Catches/stumpings	17/–
- Source: Cricinfo, 19 July 2013

Stanley Charles Eve (18 December 1925 – 27 January 1990) was an English cricketer who played first-class cricket for Essex between 1949 and 1957.

Eve was born in Stepney and educated at Upminster School. He was amateur batsman who liked to score runs quickly from the start of his innings. He scored a century in his second match for Essex, finishing with 120 made in just over two hours against Warwickshire; Essex won by an innings in two days in a match in which no other batsman reached 40. His Essex teammate Dickie Dodds later wrote of that innings: "Watching him cut and pull and dance down the wicket to drive was a breathtaking experience. He looked a complete player ..." Later that season he scored 69 not out against Surrey in an Essex total of 145 when none of his teammates exceeded 12.

After 1949, Eve's business commitments prevented him from applying himself to first-class cricket. He played a few more matches for Essex but with only moderate success. He was a prolific scorer for the Upminster club for many years.
