= James Halliday (weightlifter) =

British weightlifter (1918–2007)

Personal information
- Nationality: British (English)
- Born: 19 January 1918 Farnworth, Lancashire, England
- Died: 6 June 2007 (aged 89)

Sport
- Sport: Weightlifting
- Event: Lightweight
- Club: Bolton
Medal record
Weightlifting
Representing Great Britain
Olympic Games
Bronze medal – third place	1948 London	Lightweight
Representing England
British Empire Games
Gold medal – first place	1950 Auckland	-67.5kg
Gold medal – first place	1954 Vancouver	-75kg

James Halliday (19 January 1918 – 6 June 2007) was a weightlifter from Great Britain who competed at two Summer Olympics. He went by the nickname "Jumping Jim" .

== Weightlifting career ==
He competed for Great Britain in the 1948 Summer Olympics held in London, England, in the lightweight event where he finished third behind the winner, the outstanding Egyptian lifter Ibrahim Shams.

He represented the English team at the 1950 British Empire Games in Auckland, New Zealand, where he won the gold medal in the lightweight category.

Four years later he repeated the feat by winning another gold medal for the English team at the 1954 British Empire and Commonwealth Games in Vancouver, Canada.

== Personal life ==
Halliday's participation was remarkable as he had been a prisoner of war in the Far East from 1942 to 1945 having been captured when Singapore fell to the Japanese on 15 February 1942. During his imprisonment, he managed to lift a barbell (which had been made from wood) over his head, something which the other British prisoners (or the Japanese guards) could not manage. As a result of this, the Japanese commander cut the British prisoners' food rations as he believed they were getting too strong. He had weighed little more than 6 stone (38 kg) after three years as a PoW, including working on the Burma Railway.

He worked on the coal gang at Kearsley Power Station and later became the Electricity Board's chief safety officer, travelling around the country lecturing men on how to lift heavy bags or dig holes.
