= João Uva de Matos Proença =

Portuguese diplomat

João Uva de Matos Proença GColIH, KCMG (June 4, 1938-January 30, 1990) was a Portuguese diplomat who served in a number of posts, including as Ambassador to the United Nations, Ambassador to Canada and Director of Political Affairs at the Portuguese Ministry of Foreign Affairs.
