= Ibrahim Shams =

Egyptian weightlifter

Olympic medal record

Men's Weightlifting

Representing Egypt
Gold medal – first place	1948 London	-67.5 kg
Bronze medal – third place	1936 Berlin	-60 kg

Ibrahim Hassanien Shams (Egyptian Arabic: ابراهيم شمس; January 16, 1917 – January 16, 2001) was an Egyptian weightlifter who competed in the 1936 Summer Olympics and in the 1948 Summer Olympics. He was born in Alexandria.

In 1936 he won the bronze medal in the featherweight class. Due to the start of World War II and cancellation of the Olympics in both 1940 and 1944, he was forced to wait until the 1948 Summer Olympics to prove himself again. He received a gold medal by lifting a total of 360 kg in the lightweight event. He was the second Egyptian to earn two Olympic medals, after Farid Simaika, who earned them in diving at the 1928 Summer Olympics. Shams was the first Egyptian to win two medals at two different Olympic tournaments.

== International success ==
- 1936, bronze medal, 1936 Berlin, Featherweight, with 300 kg, behind Anthony Terlazzo, USA, 312.5 kg and Saleh Soliman, Egypt, 305 kg.
- 1938, World Championships in Vienna, Lightweight, with three invalid attempts.
- 1946, 5 course, world championship in Paris, Featherweight, with 295 kg.
- 1948, Gold Medal, 1948 London, with 360 kg, behind Attia Hamouda, Egypt, with 360 kg but heavier and James Halliday, United Kingdom, with 340 kg.
- 1949, The World Cup in Cheveningen, lightweight, with 352.5 kg, behind Joe Pitman, USA, with 342.5 kg and Arvid Andersson, Sweden, with 322.5 kg.
- 1951, The World Cup in Milan, lightweight, with 342.5 kg, behind Joe Pitman, 337.5 kg and Ferdows, Iran with 327.5 kg.
- 1951, The Mediterranean Games in Alexandria, with 342.5 (95.0, 112.0, 135.0) kg, behind Ermanno Pignati, Italy, 307.5 (85.0, 100.0, 122.5) kg, and Bahjat Dalloul, Syria 300.0 (95.0, 95.5, 112.5) kg.
