= Roger Rubini =

Swiss weightlifter (1920–2007)

Personal information
- Nationality: Swiss
- Born: 25 January 1920
- Died: August 2007 (aged 87)

Sport
- Sport: Weightlifting

Roger Rubini (25 January 1920 – August 2007) was a Swiss weightlifter. He competed at the 1948 Summer Olympics and the 1952 Summer Olympics. Rubini died in August 2007, at the age of 87.
