= Vern Barberis =

Australian weightlifter (1928–2005)

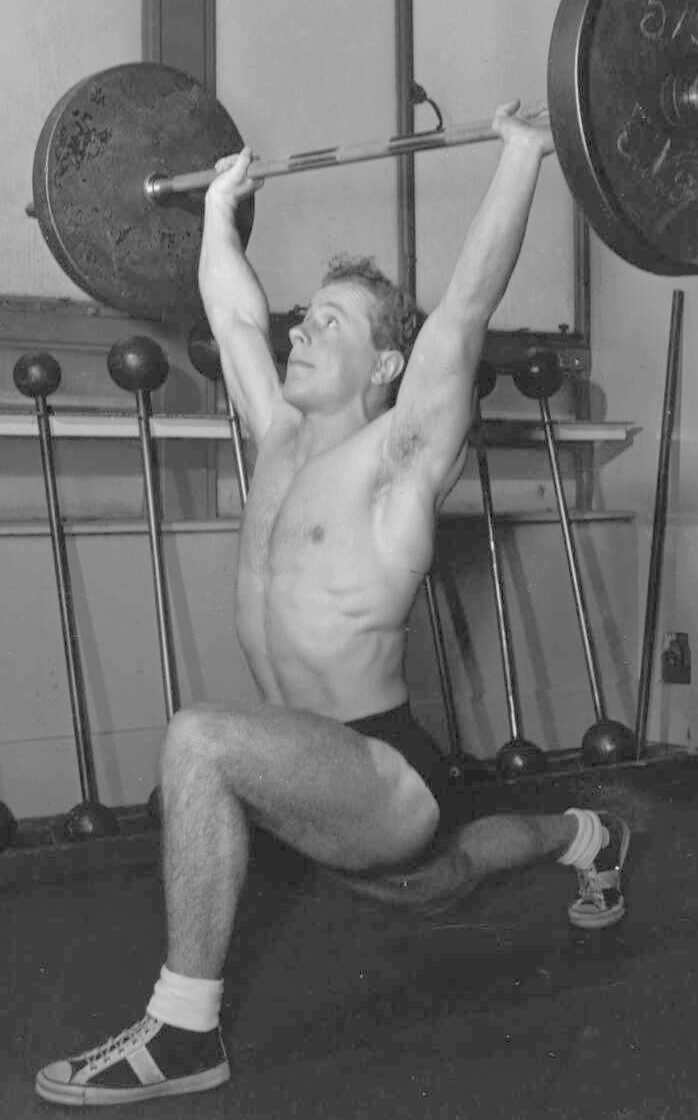
- Barberis c. 1950

Personal information
- Nationality: Australian
- Born: Verdi Barberis; 27 June 1928
- Died: 6 January 2005 (aged 76) Albury, New South Wales, Australia

Sport
- Country: Australia
- Sport: Weightlifting
Medal record
Representing Australia
Olympic Games
Bronze medal – third place	1952 Helsinki	Lightweight
Commonwealth Games
Bronze medal – third place	1950 Auckland	Lightweight
Gold medal – first place	1954 Vancouver	Lightweight

Verdi "Vern" Barberis (27 June 1928 – 6 January 2005) was an Australian lightweight weightlifter.

Barberis grew up in Melbourne and attended the University of Melbourne and studied science. He won a bronze medal at the 1950 British Empire Games in Auckland, New Zealand, lifting a total of 730 lb (330 kg). This was the first time that weightlifting had been contested at the Games. He won another bronze medal at the 1952 Summer Olympics, becoming the first Australian to win a weightlifting medal at the Olympics. Later at the 1954 British Empire and Commonwealth Games he became the first Australian to win a weightlifting gold medal at a major international competition. The seven-time national champion rounded out his career at the 1956 Summer Olympics in his home city of Melbourne, where he finished 11th.

Barberis was the first Australian lightweight to clean and jerk over 300 lb (140 kg) which at the time exceeded the Victorian heavyweight record. His Australian records stood for many years and his Victorian snatch record lasted twenty years.

Barberis was a highly respected teacher and trainer. Between 1969 and 1971, he served as President of the Australian Weightlifting Federation. He was later inducted into the AWF Hall of Fame, and on 30 August 2000 awarded the Australian Sports Medal for his weightlifting achievements.
