= Jules Sylvain (weightlifter) =

Canadian weightlifter

Personal information
- Born: 20 December 1925 Quebec City, Quebec, Canada
- Died: 24 November 2016 (aged 90) Quebec City, Quebec, Canada

Sport
- Sport: Weightlifting

Jules Sylvain (20 December 1925 – 24 November 2016) was a Canadian weightlifter. He competed at the 1952 Summer Olympics and the 1956 Summer Olympics.
