= John Stuart (weightlifter) =

Canadian weightlifter (born 1920)

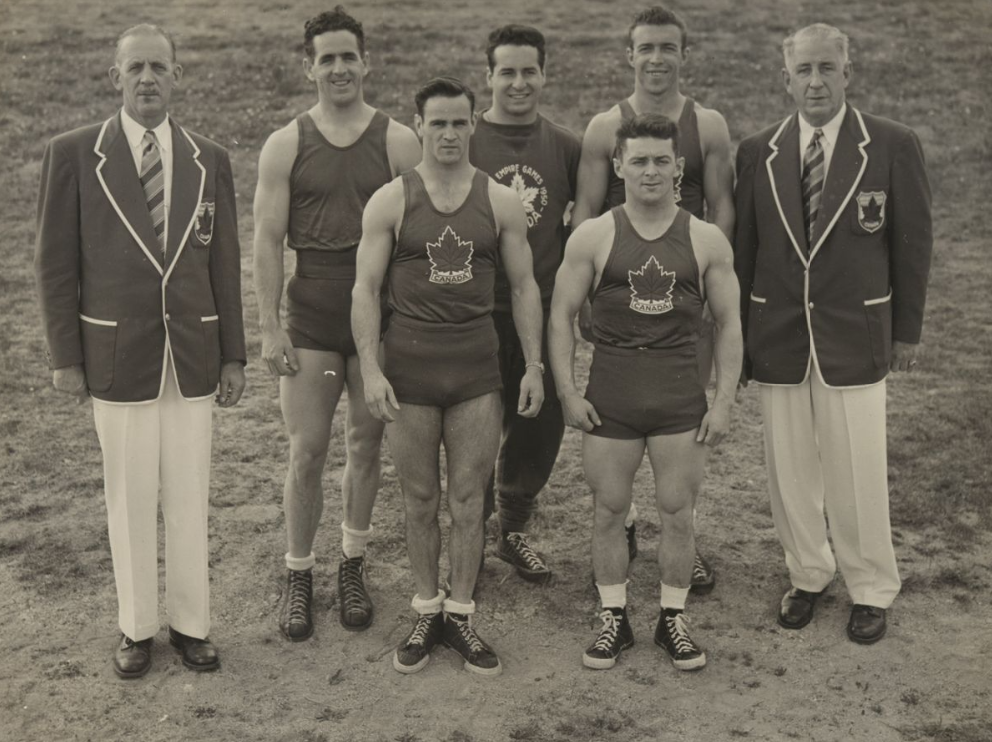
- 1950 British Empire Games weightlifting Canadian team Back row: Jim Varaleau, Gerald Gratton, John Stuart. Front row: J. W. Davies (General Manager), Jules Sylvain, Rosaire Smith (team captain) and Frank Saxon (team manager); Auckland Libraries Heritage Collections

Personal information
- Nationality: Canadian
- Born: January 24, 1920 Dumbarton, Scotland

Sport
- Sport: Weightlifting
- Weight class: 67.5 kg
Medal record
Men's Weightlifting
Representing Canada
World Championships
Silver medal – second place	1947 Philadelphia	67.5 kg

John William Claud Stuart (born January 24, 1920, date of death unknown) was a Canadian weightlifter, who competed in the lightweight class and represented Canada at international competitions. He won the silver medal at the 1947 World Weightlifting Championships in the 67.5 kg category. Stuart is deceased.
