= Aquatic-terrestrial subsidies =

Aspect of ecological connectivity

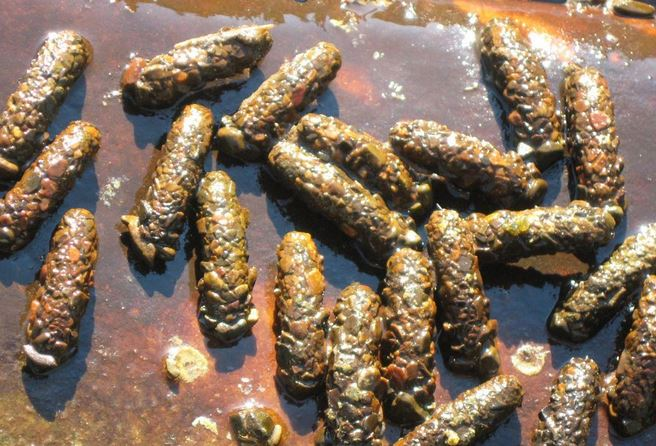
Aquatic pupae stage of a Caddisfly.

Energy, nutrients, and contaminants derived from aquatic ecosystems and transferred to terrestrial ecosystems are termed aquatic-terrestrial subsidies or, more simply, aquatic subsidies. Common examples of aquatic subsidies include organisms that move across habitat boundaries and deposit their nutrients as they decompose in terrestrial habitats or are consumed by terrestrial predators, such as spiders, lizards, birds, and bats. Aquatic insects that develop within streams and lakes before emerging as winged adults and moving to terrestrial habitats contribute to aquatic subsidies. Fish removed from aquatic ecosystems by terrestrial predators are another important example. Conversely, the flow of energy and nutrients from terrestrial ecosystems to aquatic ecosystems are considered terrestrial subsidies, like leaf litter entering a stream. Both aquatic subsidies and terrestrial subsidies are types of cross-boundary subsidies. Energy and nutrients are derived from outside the ecosystem where they are ultimately consumed.

Allochthonous describes resources and energy derived from another ecosystem; aquatic-terrestrial subsidies are examples of allochthonous resources. Autochthonous resources are produced by plants or algae within the local ecosystem Allochthonous resources, including aquatic-terrestrial subsidies, can subsidize predator populations and increase predator impacts on prey populations, sometimes initiating trophic cascades. Nutritional traits of autochthonous and allochthonous resources influences their use by microorganisms, animals and other consumers, even when they are readily available.

== Resource subsidies ==
Resource subsidies, in forms of nutrients, matter, or organisms, describe movements of essential resources across habitat boundaries to animals or other consumers. These inputs of resources can influence individual growth, species abundance and diversity, community structure, secondary productivity and food web dynamics.

Resource subsidies supplement the productivity of the recipient consumer, but the consumer has little impact on productivity of the resource. As a result, resource subsidies are described as "donor-controlled". The flux rate of the subsidy is independent of productivity in the recipient habitat. Aquatic-terrestrial resource subsidies are often strongly seasonal. Aquatic insect emergence is typically highest during the warm season, while terrestrial leaf fall into aquatic habitats is associated with autumn in temperate biomes. The timing of these resource-subsidy pulses is important to how they are used by predators and other consumers, and the impacts on predator-prey dynamics in recipient habitats. In some cases, subsidies can destabilize predator-prey dynamics in recipient habitats. For example, blooms of algae can increase insect productivity and emergence, resulting in growth of terrestrial predator populations.

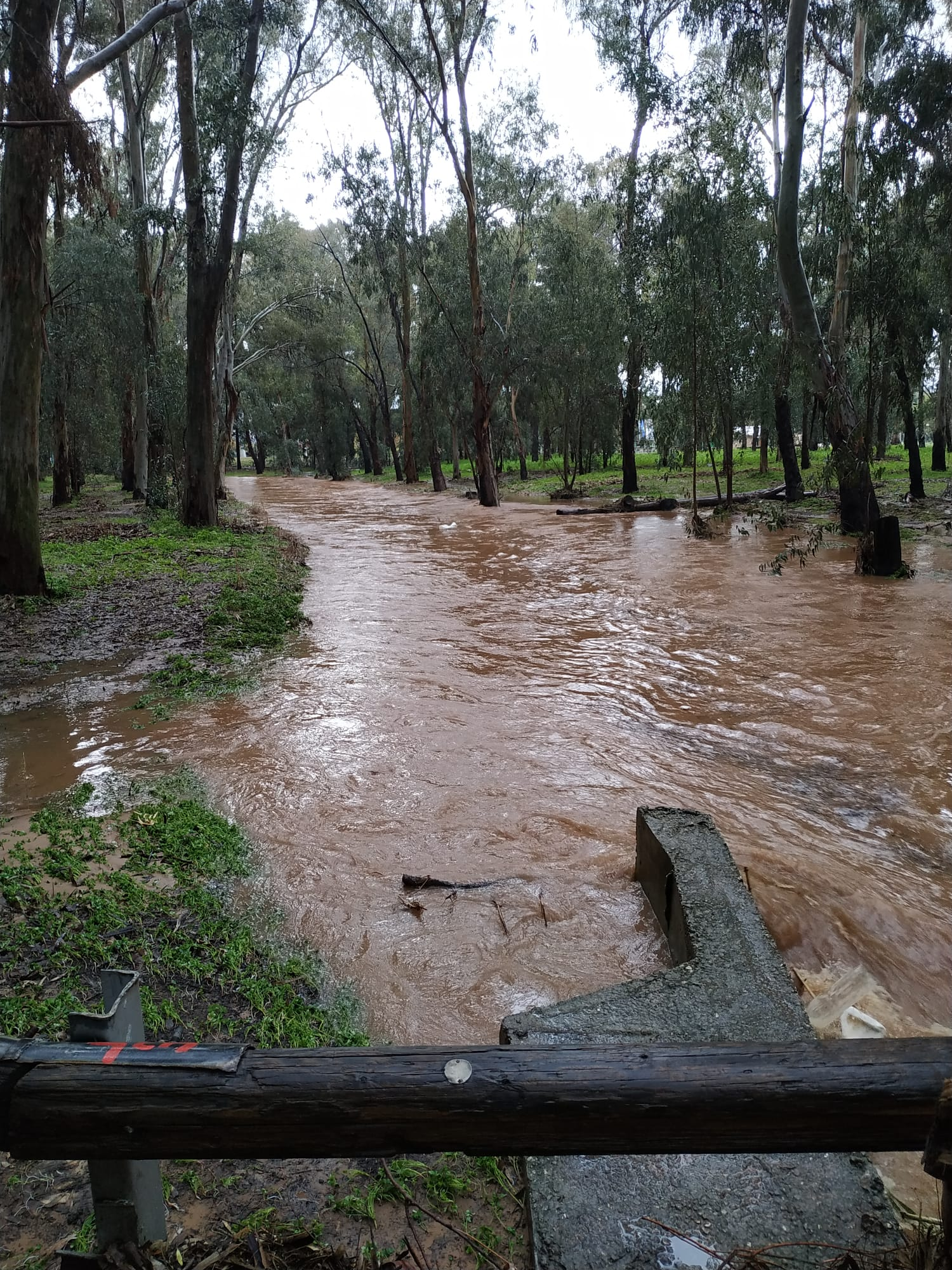
This flooding stream is delivering aquatic subsidies to the surrounding terrestrial area.

The rate of resource subsidy fluxes is mediated by the permeability of ecotones and modified by physical and biological factors. Species interactions within donor habitats and variability in climate can both alter rates of cross-habitat resource fluxes. The response of recipient consumers to an influx of resources depends on conditions within the recipient habitat; effects are largest when other resources are scarce within the recipient habitat. Flows between terrestrial and stream environments are among the best studied cross-boundary subsidies.

== Aquatic subsidies ==
Aquatic subsidies are energy or nutrients that are transferred from the aquatic environment to the terrestrial environment. These aquatic subsidies vary spatially and seasonally. Subsidies support ecosystem functions and link interactions between species.

Marine anadromous fishes such as salmon provide a subsidy to freshwater and then terrestrial ecosystems through spawning and carcasses. These marine-derived nutrients provide resources to a range of species both in the stream and on land. Terrestrial species that feed on salmon include river otters, mink, bald eagles and bears. Stream invertebrates such as stoneflies, caddisflies and midges also derive energy and nutrients from salmon and, in turn, provide food to terrestrial species such as birds and bats. Animals are not the only benefactors of these aquatic subsidies, riparian plants can receive up to 26% of their nitrogen from salmon.

Lateral movement of nutrients and energy from the stream to the surrounding riparian zone and terrestrial environment beyond serve an important role in food webs. Flooding of a stream and the movement of organisms both act to transfer nutrients and energy sources to the terrestrial environment. Algae and fine organic matter washed up from high flows provide resources to herbivorous species and promote plant germination. These lateral movements are limited in how far they make it away from the stream without help, but terrestrial species can increase the distance that these subsidies travel. For example, the emergence of adult aquatic insects from streams is one of the most distinct and well studied forms of aquatic subsidies. They supply 25–100% of the energy or carbon to riparian species such as spiders, bats, birds, and lizards. Emergence of aquatic insects typically peaks in the summer of temperate zones, prompting predators to aggregate and forage along riparian and stream boundaries. These species typically feed near the water's edge but then when they leave to travel elsewhere, their feces will add nutrients to other environments. Another example of a terrestrial species that moves aquatic subsidies further inland is that of the brown bear. Brown bears consume a massive amount of salmon from streams, so much so, they are considered a keystone species. Brown bears have been shown to deliver as much as 84% of the nitrogen found in white spruce trees that are up to 500 meters from the stream on the Kenai Peninsula (Alaska, USA) through their interactions with aquatic subsidies.

== Ecological importance of aquatic subsidies ==
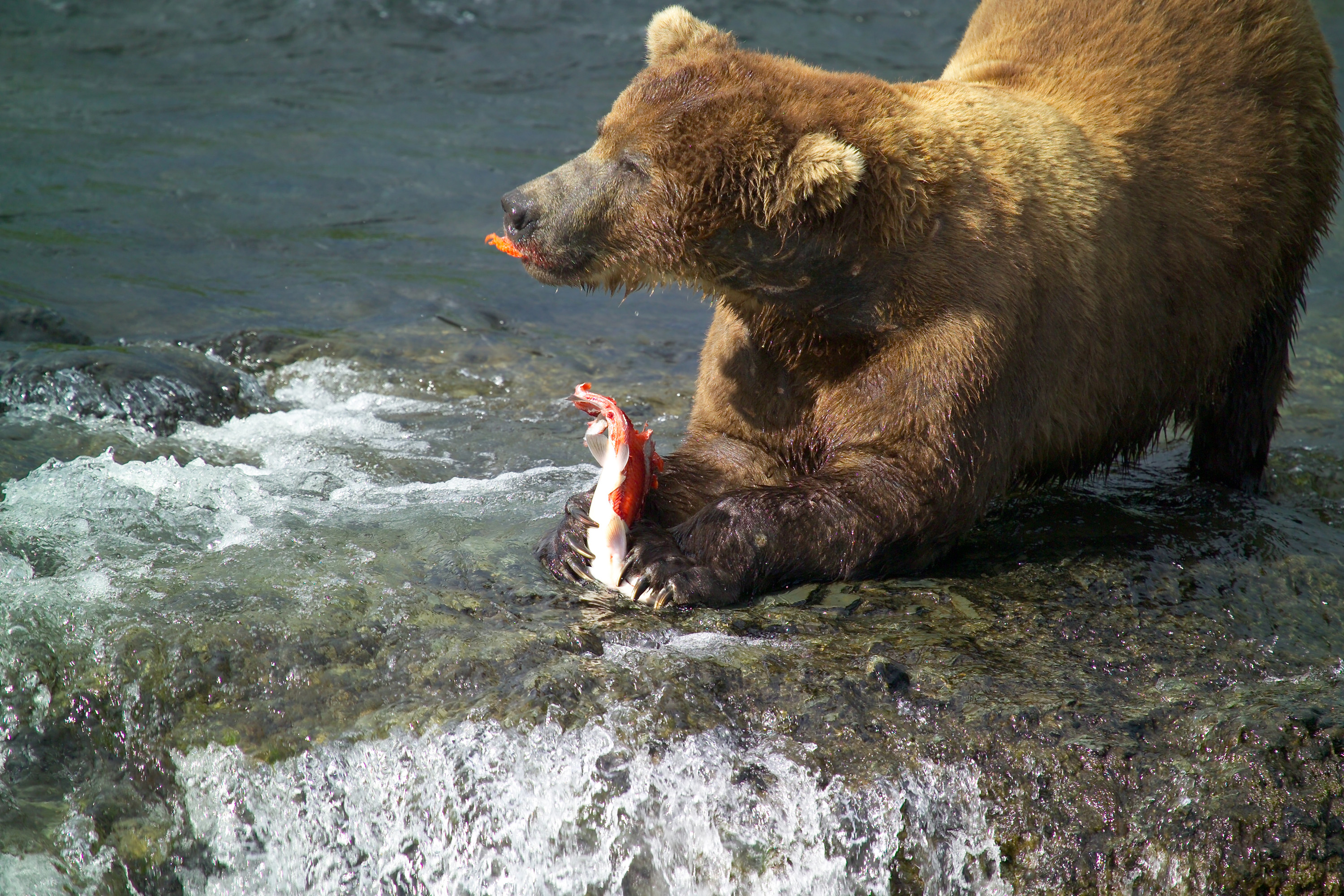
Brown bear feeding on marine-derived nutrients in the form of salmon.

Although inputs from the terrestrial environment to an aquatic one (terrestrial subsidies) have been studied extensively, aquatic inputs to the terrestrial environment (aquatic subsidies) haven't been as widely studied. Aquatic subsidies, however, can be extremely important in the terrestrial landscape and are generally of higher nutritional quality because they come from animal, rather than plant-based or detrital, sources. These aquatic subsidies may be more important than terrestrial prey for riparian predators in some ecosystems.

However, aquatic subsidies are also increasingly recognized as important sources of environmental contaminants to terrestrial food webs. Aquatic animals can accumulate pollutants in their tissues and exoskeletons (such as metals and polychlorinated biphenyls) and move them to riparian and terrestrial systems as they emerge or when they are consumed by terrestrial predators.

While aquatic subsidies provide a pathway for anthropogenic stressors to propagate from aquatic to terrestrial ecosystems, they are themselves being impacted by global change. Global warming and habitat modification change both the physiology and phenology of emerging aquatic insects as well as the physical boundary between water and land, which in turn affects their dispersal. In temperate regions, increasing temperature increases the growth and emergence rate of aquatic insects, while in tropical regions aquatic insect emergence rates decline.

== Terrestrial subsidies ==
Terrestrial subsidies are primary production on land that is transferred to aquatic ecosystems as litter fall or dissolved organic matter.

Terrestrial subsidies or allochthonous inputs into aquatic environments are a major component of organic carbon budgets for aquatic systems. In many ecosystems autochthonous production of carbon is not enough to support the food web and organisms rely on allochthonous to maintain secondary production. Aquatic ecosystems are generally heterotrophic; respiration exceeds production, suggesting the food web is supported externally. The carbon that enters the aquatic ecosystem from terrestrial inputs is taken up by micro-organisms like bacteria and fungi which are then consumed by higher trophic levels This microbial transfer of organic carbon has shown to support food webs in lakes and streams.

Organic carbon inputs into aquatic ecosystems come in multiple forms. The two main forms are dissolved organic carbon (DOC) or particulate organic carbon (POC). Particulate organic carbon includes living organisms like bacteria, phytoplankton, zooplankton, as well as detrital components. Dissolved organic carbon is organic carbon that has been broken down, is suspended, and considered soluble in water. Dissolved organic carbon has been shown to stimulate heterotrophic production in aquatic settings and heterotrophic bacteria can use dissolved organic carbon to support their growth. Particulate organic carbon also stimulates heterotrophic production which becomes available to bacteria or other micro-organisms through decomposition and other consumers by direct consumption.

Terrestrial invertebrates such as spiders, caterpillars, and ants are also an important form of terrestrial subsidy to aquatic ecosystems.

Drift-feeding fish can rely on falling terrestrial invertebrates for up to half of their annual energy budget. Variation in the flux of terrestrial invertebrates is dependent on the weather, time – annual and daily – and the riparian architecture. Warmer and more humid temperatures, generally associated with summer and early fall, facilitate greater invertebrate activity and thus larger subsidies, whereas wet seasons reduce the flux of terrestrial invertebrates. Daily, the input of terrestrial invertebrates is greatest during afternoons and evenings. Finally, riparian zones composed of closed canopy deciduous vegetation can support higher density and diversity of fishes compared to other vegetation types, due to the greater supply of terrestrial invertebrates.

Terrestrial leaf litter, wood inputs and deposition of pollen are important organic matter sources that augment benthic invertebrate productivity. In particular, these terrestrial subsidies are vital for detritivores and shredders and control their population sizes. Benthic invertebrate communities respond swiftly to changes in the supply of organic matter; the absence of litter stocks led to a drastic decline in productivity and predators in one experimental temperate stream system. Furthermore, provision of organic matter may increase productivity and create hypoxic conditions in streams; however, this is typically uncommon given the high turnover and low residence time of water. In the Mara River basin, though, substantial rates of organic matter and nutrient loading by hippopotami create subsidy overloads in hippo pools, stimulate anoxic conditions approximately three times a year, and cause multiple fish kill events.

== Contaminants as aquatic-terrestrial subsidies ==
Aquatic-terrestrial contaminant subsidies originating in the aquatic environment can be transported across ecosystem boundaries, primarily mediated by organisms. The transmission of contaminants can have negative ecological consequences that amplify up the food chain, including reduced nesting success of birds, disruptions to riparian food webs, and contamination of otherwise pristine environments. The mechanism of aquatic-terrestrial contaminant transfer can be especially influential when there are no additional sources of those contaminants to the terrestrial system.

=== Types of contaminant subsidies ===
Various organic compounds, trace elements, metals, algal toxins, pesticides, and pharmaceutical waste products resulting from intentional or incidental releases via human activities can act as contaminant subsidies. After being loaded into waterways, contaminants that accumulate in the aquatic food web can return to terrestrial environments through consumption by organisms.

=== Movement pathways through animals ===
Organisms serve as the vector for transportation of contaminant subsidies across trophic levels and aquatic-terrestrial ecosystem boundaries. Understanding the fate of aquatic-terrestrial subsidies is key to predicting their impact on terrestrial consumers.

==== Invertebrates ====
Aquatic invertebrates take up contaminants introduced to the environment via the water column, by grazing on surfaces, and from contaminated sediment. These contaminants can have several fates depending on their biochemical properties. One, that contaminants like metals and polycyclic aromatic hydrocarbons (PAHs) are preferentially shed into the exoskeleton during metamorphosis, and then recycled into the aquatic environment. Two, macroinvertebrates eaten during aquatic or larval stages transfer their contaminant burdens to higher aquatic trophic levels such as fish and those contaminants are retained by the aquatic environment. Contaminants that would otherwise be shed during metamorphosis are therefore most likely to be taken up by aquatic predators of larval stage insects. Three, larval aquatic macroinvertebrates can transfer contaminant subsidies directly to terrestrial environments following successful metamorphosis to their adult form. In particular, man-made organic contaminants like polychlorinated biphenyls (PCBs) can become concentrated in adults. Predator risk for the uptake of organic contaminants is higher when preying upon adult life stages of aquatic insects, and adult aquatic insects are more likely to be consumed by terrestrial predators such as birds. Terrestrial predatory invertebrates have also been identified as vectors of contaminant transport. In particular, riparian spiders have been shown to move contaminants, such as methylmercury, originating in aquatic prey to the terrestrial environment.

==== Fish ====
Because many fish species prey upon macroinvertebrates that may have taken up contaminants, fish are an important middle trophic level for contaminant transport. Subsequent consumption of fish from aquatic environments by terrestrial predators is a significant movement pathway for aquatic-terrestrial subsidies.

Anadromous migratory fish, such as salmon, transport contaminants far distances and across aquatic ecosystem boundaries. The consumption of salmon by terrestrial predators, such as bears, when salmon return to freshwater ecosystems to spawn transfers marine-derived contaminant subsidies to terrestrial systems far removed from areas of contaminant uptake by the aquatic food web. Salmon can be the largest dietary source of marine-derived contaminants consumed by bears. Salmon-derived contaminants are also transported to recipient aquatic ecosystems where salmon spawn and/or die. Contaminants may be maternally transferred to eggs or recycled to the base of aquatic food for subsequent trophic transfer to higher trophic levels. Consumption of animals containing these contaminants by terrestrial predators is another pathway of aquatic-terrestrial subsidy transfer across large spatial scales.

==== Birds ====
Fish-eating birds are at the topmost trophic level of many aquatic food webs. As a result, birds are often the recipients of aquatic contaminant subsidies and transporters of aquatic contaminants to the terrestrial environment. An area of much research in birds is the tendency for contaminants present in the aquatic environment to biomagnify to significant levels in predatory birds. This phenomenon was exemplified by DDT biomagnification in predatory birds during the 1960s in the US, which resulted in the collapse of many bird populations.

Migratory birds share the same capacity for contaminant transport across vast distances as fish. This may be of particular concern with Arctic migratory birds, as they have the ability to transport contaminants to environments with otherwise limited contaminant input. Birds can also recycle contaminants back to aquatic environments via guano.

=== Ecological consequences of contaminant subsidies ===
==== Impacts of contaminant subsidies on terrestrial predators ====
For flies and other metamorphosing insects, high burdens of Se, PCB, metals, synthetic nanoparticles, and other contaminants can decrease body and reproductive fitness, leading to reduced amounts of larvae metamorphosing and emerging from the water column as terrestrial adults. When contaminant exposure does not impact metamorphosis or emergence, emerging insects may carry high concentrations of contaminants that are readily bioavailable to the terrestrial food web. Consuming these contaminated prey items can result in severe histological, circulatory, digestive, and reproductive issues in terrestrial predators like spiders, amphibians, reptiles, mammals, and birds. The large number of insects that some predators need to consume in proportion to body mass for survival raises the risk of contaminant bioaccumulation, increasing the likelihood of developmental deformities and mortalities. This also can result in the biomagnification of organic and element subsidies like PCBs, selenium, and mercury by higher trophic levels that consume contaminated aquatic insects and their primary consumers like arthropods and fish. Contaminant levels in prey can be so highly concentrated that, for example, small-bodied songbird chicks can experience adverse physiological effects from feeding on a single spider containing high levels of PCB (at less than 6,000 parts per billion).

==== Ecosystem-wide impacts ====
Concentrated contamination of aquatic insect populations can facilitate a decline in the ecological health of aquatic and terrestrial ecosystems. Consumption of contaminated insects either continues the contaminant pathway up trophic levels or excretion returns the subsidies back into the sediment, a major sink of contaminants in aquatic environments. Due to the movement of subsidies through lotic systems and emergence patterns of flying insects, the source of contamination can be some distance away from the source of contamination and affected habitats. Furthermore, the massive biomass of insects compared to other animals, and the sequestration of organic contaminants in one water body, can lead to large amounts of contaminants being exported across many different terrestrial ecosystems. From a single creek, it was estimated that emerging insects exported around 6 grams of PCBs per year to land, which is equivalent to the amount exported by 50,000 migrating salmon in an entire watershed. The subsequent reduction in recruitment from a lack of prey or consumption of contaminant subsidies can lead to local extirpations of fish, and aquatic and arachnivorous birds. The loss of biomass and reduced subsidy pathways deteriorate the complexity of aquatic and terrestrial food webs. As the biodiversity of a habitat decreases, its ecological resilience to further contamination and food web restructuring also declines.

== Measuring aquatic-terrestrial connections ==
Researchers use several tools to assess how terrestrial and aquatic food webs are connected. Stable isotopes, particularly of carbon, nitrogen, hydrogen, and oxygen, can be used to determine what resources consumers are eating. Other compounds, such as fatty acids, can also be used to trace food web connections between aquatic and terrestrial ecosystems.

Stable carbon isotope ratios (ratio of carbon 13 (^{13}C) to carbon 12 (^{12}C)), are one of the most common methods used to measure the energy inputs and sources for aquatic ecosystems, and can be used to track flux of aquatic resources into riparian zones. Naturally occurring variation in carbon stable isotope ratios can often distinguish organic matter produced by photosynthesis of terrestrial plants or aquatic algae. A more precise but also more expensive method requires adding a form of carbon labelled with an extreme ratio of carbon 13 (^{13}C) to carbon 12 (^{12}C) that does not naturally occur and which can be used to trace the movement of the added carbon through the ecosystem and food web. Once the tracer carbon has had time to go through the system, samples of water, algae, bacteria, and other organisms are collected and the ratios of carbon 13 (^{13}C) to carbon 12 (^{12}C) in their tissues are determined. A food web can then be drawn by tracing what organisms have taken up the tracer carbon and how much. Stable isotope ratios are measured using an isotope ratio mass spectrometer from dried organic samples.

There is sometimes overlap between terrestrial plants and algae in naturally occurring stable carbon isotope ratios, complicating their use in identifying aquatic-terrestrial subsidies. Stable isotope ratios of hydrogen (ratio of deuterium to hydrogen) can be used to distinguish terrestrial and aquatic primary production when carbon isotope ratios overlap. However, stable hydrogen isotope ratios of aquatic organisms can also be influenced by variation in the isotope ratios present in the water molecules of the aquatic environment. Stable isotope ratios of nitrogen are particularly useful in tracing fluxes of marine-derived resources such as anadromous fish into riparian and terrestrial environments.

== Measuring contaminant subsidies and impacts ==
The movement of aquatic-terrestrial contaminant subsidies can first be measured by testing the water quality of sites with known contamination or near urban centers or factories that discharge chemical waste. This enables scientists to determine where contaminants are highly concentrated in aquatic habitats. Next, aquatic insects are often collected and analyzed for contaminant loads and to model any population changes. Aquatic insects are commonly studied to estimate water quality because many species are highly sensitive to pollution, resulting in community composition changes in contaminated waterbodies. Finally, researchers study histological, blood, gut, feather, and egg samples from predators to determine if contaminants are traveling up trophic levels via the consumption of contaminated prey and what negative effects this may have on predators.
