= Peter McKenzie (conservationist) =

New Zealand conservationist (1952–2012)

- Born: 10 September 1952; Wellington, New Zealand
- Died: 15 April 2012 (aged 59)

Peter Howard McKenzie (10 September 1952 – 15 April 2012) was a New Zealand conservationist and founder of the Ngā Manu Nature Reserve in Waikanae, New Zealand.

== Biography ==
Born in Wellington in 1952, McKenzie was the son of philanthropist Sir Roy McKenzie and grandson of the founder of the McKenzies retail chain Sir John McKenzie. He was educated at Nelson College from 1966 to 1969, where his interest in native plants was encouraged through spending time at the school's outdoor education centre, Mataki Lodge, near Murchison.

In 1974 McKenzie formed Ngā Manu Trust and in 1978 the trust first leased and later bought the current site of Ngā Manu Nature Reserve in Waikanae.

In the mid 1970s McKenzie was instrumental in kiwi captive breeding programmes and he was involved with the tuatara recovery programme for over 20 years.

In 2009, after three years of work, McKenzie captured footage of a puriri moth hatching from its chrysalis. They are probably the first pictures of a ghost moth emerging.

McKenzie was diagnosed with cancer in late 2010 and he died in 2012.
