= Terrestrial habitat =

Terrestrial habitat may refer to:

- Terrestrial animal, animals that live predominantly or entirely on land .
- Terrestrial plant, plants that live predominantly or entirely on land .
- Terrestrial ecology (also known as soil ecology), the study of the interactions among soil organisms, and between biotic and abiotic aspects of the soil environment.
- Terrestrial ecoregion, land ecoregions, as distinct from freshwater and marine ecoregions.
- Terrestrial ecosystem, an ecosystem found only on landforms.
- Terrestrial locomotion, movement among animals adapted from aquatic to terrestrial environments.
- Terrestrial planet, a planet that is composed primarily of silicate rocks or metals.
