= Roy McKenzie =

New Zealand horse breeder

Sir Roy McKenzie ONZ KBE
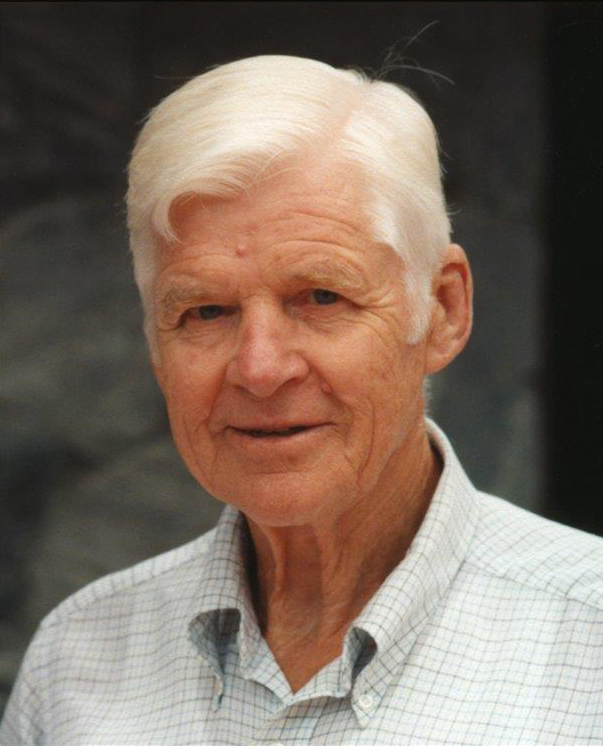
- Born: Roy Allan McKenzie; 7 November 1922; Wellington, New Zealand
- Died: 1 September 2007 (aged 84)
- Spouse: Shirley Howard (m. 1948)
- Relatives: John McKenzie (father); Peter McKenzie (son); George Carter (uncle)

Sir Roy Allan McKenzie ONZ KBE (7 November 1922 – 1 September 2007) was a New Zealand horse breeder and racer, and was well known for his philanthropy.

== Biography ==
McKenzie was the son of Sir John McKenzie, who founded the McKenzies retail chain. He was born in Wellington but went to school at Timaru Boys' High School and attended the University of Otago. During World War II he served in the Royal New Zealand Air Force and the Royal Air Force as a bomb aimer. He married Shirley Howard in 1948, and they had three children together – Peter, John and Robyn.

He was captain of the New Zealand ski team in the 1952 Winter Olympics, the first Winter Olympics that New Zealand entered; though as he was injured he did not compete.

He worked as a chartered accountant after the war, and was the Executive Director of McKenzies (NZ) Ltd from 1949 to 1970. He also served as a director for several other companies.

From 1955 he was the principal at the Roydon Lodge horse stud, and he bred, trained and raced many leading horses, including Roydon Glen, Sundon, Game Pride, Smooth Fella, Scottish Command, Jay Ar, Bonnie Frost, Captain Adios, Castleton's Pride and Garcon Roux.

From 1947 to 1993, McKenzie was on the Board of the J R McKenzie Trust, which had been established by his father in 1940 to distribute a proportion of the profits from his businesses for the benefit of the people of New Zealand. For 23 years, McKenzie chaired the Trust. He set up two other grant-making bodies: the McKenzie Education Foundation and the Roy McKenzie Foundation.

McKenzie was also patron of the Outward Bound Trust, and a councillor at the Council for Educational Research. In 1978 McKenzie helped found New Zealand's first hospice, Te Omanga. He also was a benefactor and founding patron of the Seabrook McKenzie Centre, which assists people with specific learning difficulties and their families. In 1990 he played a major role in setting up Philanthropy New Zealand, which was a regular meeting of charitable groups in New Zealand.

In the 1989 New Year Honours, McKenzie was appointed a Knight Commander of the Order of the British Empire, for services to education and the community. He was made a Member of the Order of New Zealand in the 1995 Queen's Birthday Honours, and Victoria University of Wellington and Massey University bestowed honorary doctorates upon him.

A film about his life, Giving It All Away, was made in 2004 and screened at the 2005 SXSW Film Festival.

McKenzie's son Peter was well known for his work in conservation.

== See also ==
- Harness racing in New Zealand

== Publications ==
- The Roydon Heritage. 1978. The Roydon Lodge horse stud.
- Footprints – Harnessing an Inheritance into a Legacy. 1998. ISBN 0-9582046-0-8. Memoirs.
