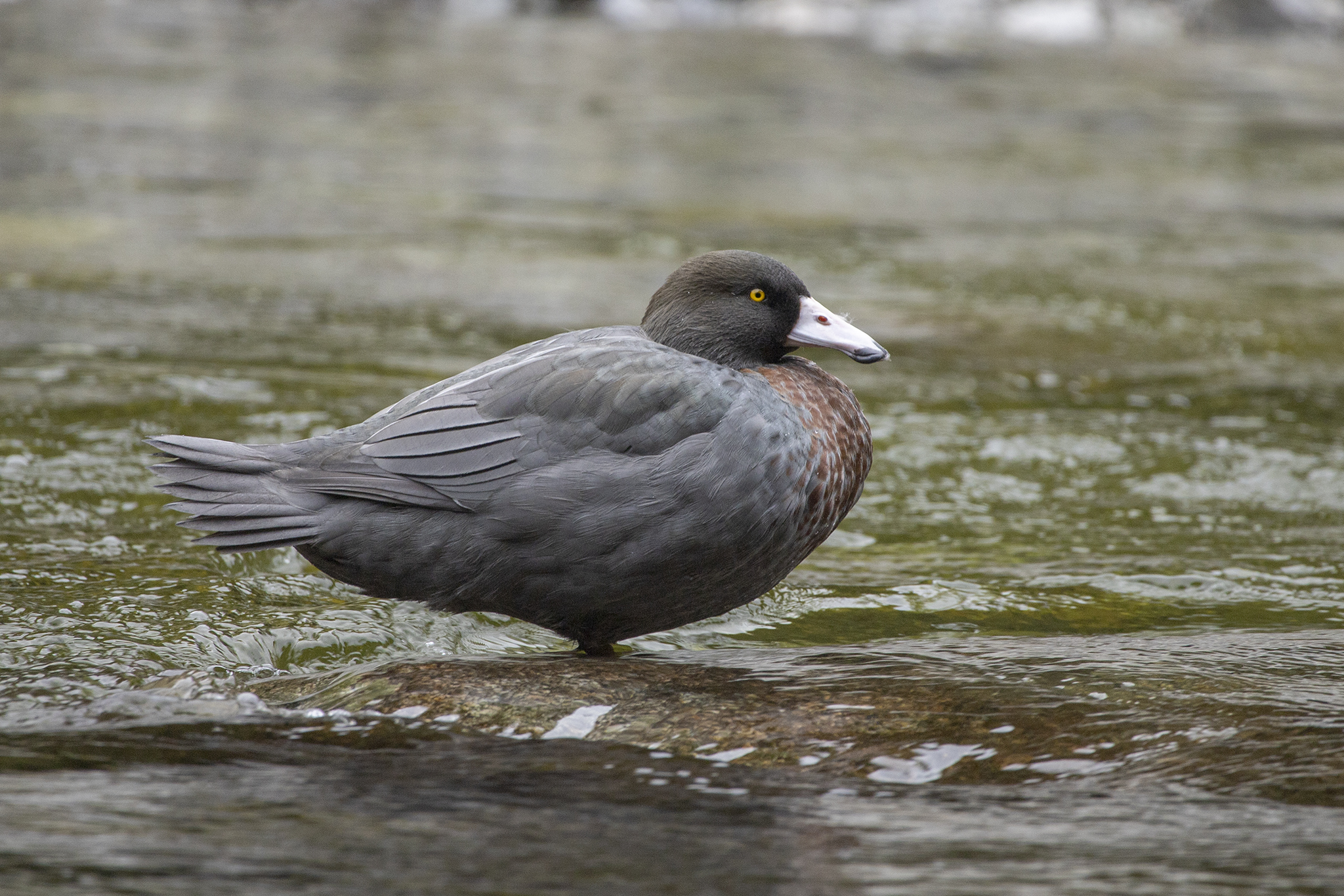
- Blue duck in Paparoa National Park

Conservation status
- Endangered (IUCN 3.1)

Scientific classification
- Kingdom: Animalia
- Phylum: Chordata
- Class: Aves
- Order: Anseriformes
- Family: Anatidae
- Genus: Hymenolaimus; G.R. Gray, 1843
- Species: H. malacorhynchos

Binomial name
- Hymenolaimus malacorhynchos (Gmelin, JF, 1789)

Subspecies
- See text
- Extant Probable original distribution where the blue duck is extinct

Synonyms
- Anas malacorhynchus (protonym)

Audio
- Blue duck pair communicating

= Blue duck =

Species of duck endemic to New Zealand

The blue duck (Hymenolaimus malacorhynchos) or whio is a member of the duck, goose and swan family, Anatidae and is endemic to New Zealand. It is the only individual species belonging to the genus Hymenolaimus. Its closest relatives are the ducks in the genus Sarkidiornis.

First seen and recorded by the British explorer, James Cook in his second voyage to New Zealand, its scientific name was given by the German naturalist, Johann Friedrich Gmelin in 1789 and later George Robert Gray in 1843. There are two subspecies of the blue duck, one in North Island and the other in South Island. Common to both gender, its physical characteristics include yellow iris, a pale grey beak with semicircular flaps and lamellae, dark-slate grey plumage, chestnut flecked breast, dark grey webbed feet, and well developed claws. The male blue duck has a high-pitched whistle, which gave its Māori name Whio, while the female has a low-pitched rattle.

The European voyages led to more human settlement in New Zealand, causing a loss of forests, and which started the decline of Blue duck in the country. It was last commonly seen in New Zealand in the 1950s following which stoat predation caused its further population decline and limiting it to only North and South Island. Geographically, it is found in clean and stable rivers which have a medium to steep gradient. It roosts close to the undercut of river banks, and can do breeding and moulting in more wider area having tributaries and small streams.

Blue ducks have a territorial behaviour with paired ducks staying in its territory during and post-breeding season. Single males often attempt to intrude into paired blue duck territory with differing results while the juvenile ducks stay close to their catchment. It mostly feeds on aquatic invertebrate larvae such as Chironomidae and caddisfly larvae. Foraging is done by using both methods–dabbling and diving. Dabbling is more commonly used by the adult blue duck than the juvenile blue duck. Also, territorial blue duck forages on mornings and evenings, while non-territorial duck forages on midday. Paired ducks defend themselves using techniques for e.g., head-low flight, upright, head-bobbing, siphon-feeding and vocalisations. When ducklings learn to fly, they lose contact with their parent blue ducks which by then becomes flightless. In the breeding season, a clutch of 6 eggs are laid with an incubation period of 35 days. They build their nest between August and December, and during breeding season the male blue duck guards the territory while the female duck incubates the eggs.

The progeny of North Island blue duck subspecies are held and bred on both North and South Island, but are later returned to their respective island. In contrast, the South Island subspecies are held and bred only locally. The WHIONE programme, operating between 2009 and 2019, located the nest of these ducks for raising it in captivity. International efforts to raise the blue duck outside New Zealand was made in the United Kingdom in 1970s, but it lasted only until 2012. Its threats include weka, stoat, man-made actions and environmental hazards. The Central North Island Blue Duck Trust (CNIBDT) works in the conservation effort towards blue duck with projects such as the "Whio Forever Project". Predator control is done with aerial 1080 operations, which are run by TBfree New Zealand and the New Zealand Department of Conservation. The blue duck is depicted on the reverse side of the New Zealand $10 banknote.

== Taxonomy ==
Captain James Cook saw the blue duck in Dusky Sound, South Island, New Zealand, on his second voyage to the South Pacific. In 1777 both Cook and the naturalist Georg Forster mentioned the blue duck in their separate accounts of the voyage. A specimen was described in 1785 by the English ornithologist John Latham in his A General Synopsis of Birds. Latham used the English name, the "soft-billed duck". When in 1789 the German naturalist Johann Friedrich Gmelin revised and expanded Carl Linnaeus's Systema Naturae he included the blue duck and placed it with all the other ducks in the genus Anas. He coined the binomial name Anas malacorhynchos and cited the earlier works. The blue duck is now the only species placed in the genus Hymenolaimus, and it was introduced specifically for the species by George Robert Gray in 1843. The genus name combines the Ancient Greek humēn, humenos meaning "skin" or "membrane" with laimos meaning "throat". The specific epithet malacorhynchos is also from Ancient Greek and combines malakos meaning "soft" with rhunkhos meaning "bill".

The species has no very close relatives. Genetic evidence published in 2010 and 2018 has shown its relationship is closest to the knob-billed and comb ducks in the pantropical genus Sarkidiornis, and with them to the Australian wood duck Chenonetta jubata. This group is then allied to a larger group of diving ducks, including the widespread genera Aythya and Netta. It was formerly thought to be related to the shelduck tribe, but these are now known to be much more distant genetically.

It is commonly known in New Zealand English by its Māori name whio, pronounced /ˈfiɔː/ FEE-oh, which is derived from male's high pitched, wheezy whistle. Other names are mountain duck and blue mountain duck.

Two subspecies are recognised:

- H. m. hymenolaimus Mathews, 1937 – central, south North Island (New Zealand)
- H. m. malacorhynchos (Gmelin, JF, 1789) – west South Island (New Zealand)

Prior to 2022, the North Island and South Island whio were considered distinct but were not distinguished as subspecies; they were, however, treated as separate management units. However, the populations were defined as distinct subspecies by the International Ornithological Congress in 2022, based on strong genetic divergence and some plumage differences. The South Island (nominate) subspecies is larger than the North Island subspecies.

== Description ==
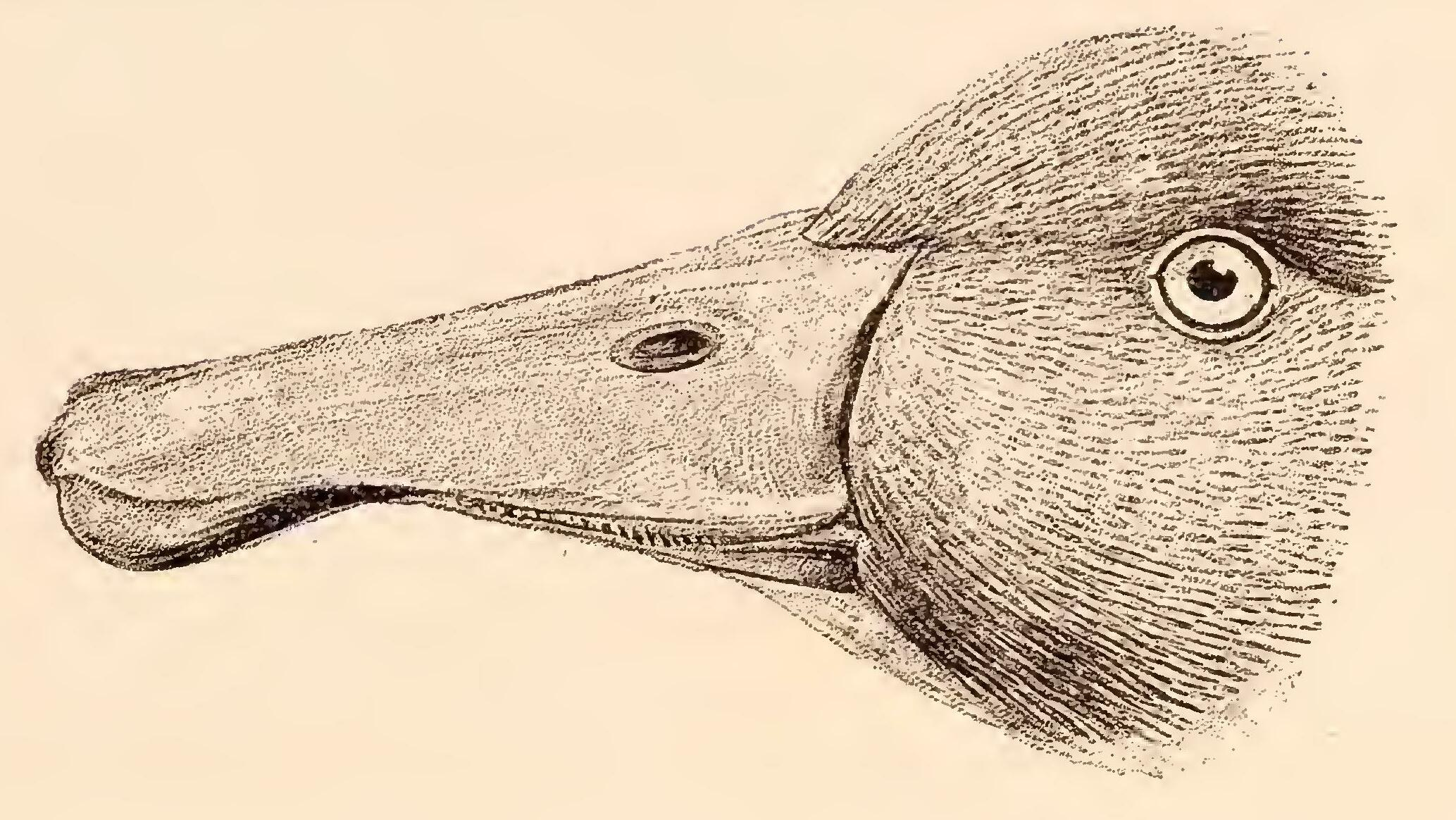
1888 illustration of the beak and head of the blue duck

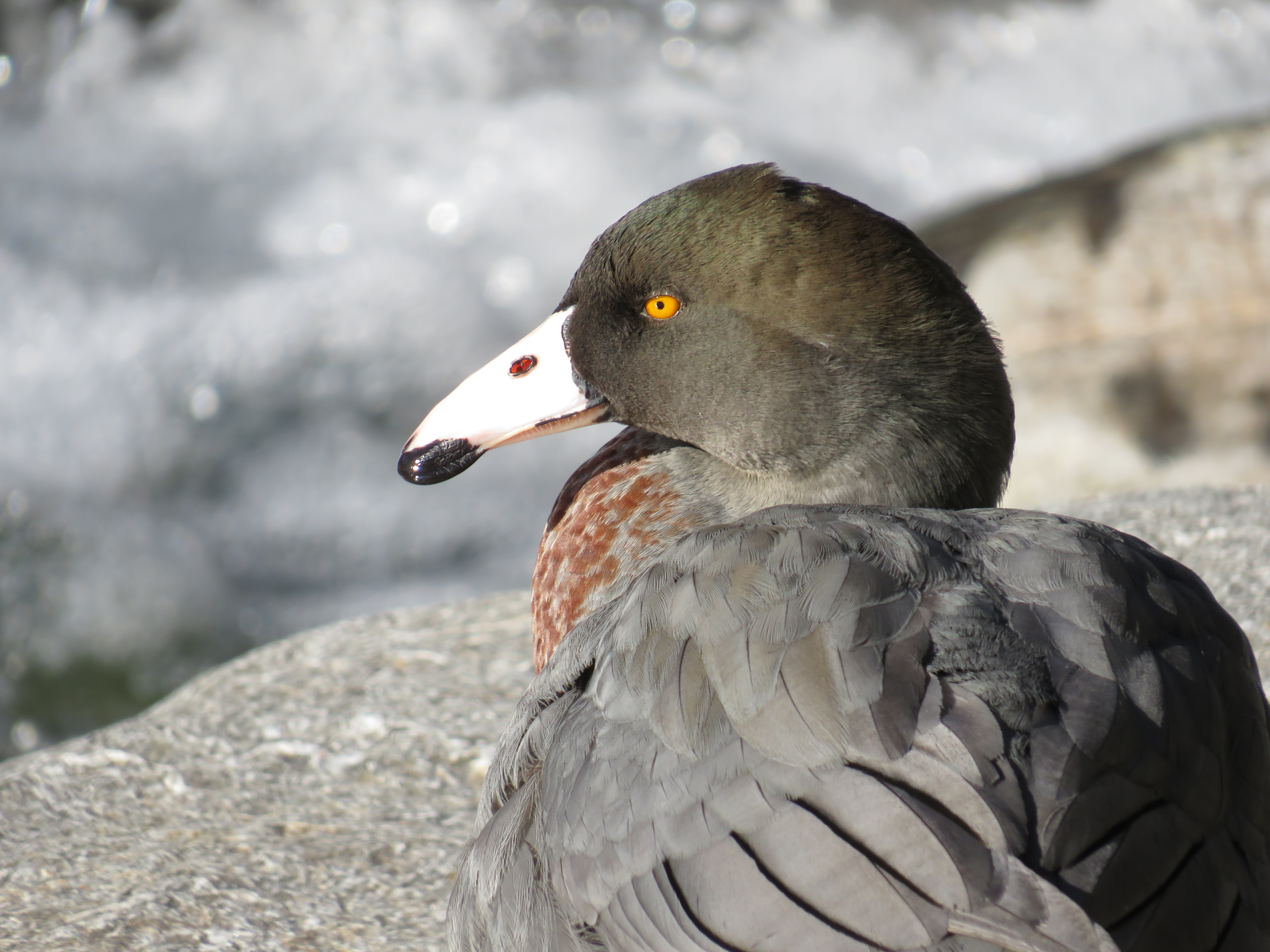
Blue duck, Mikonui River

The blue duck is 50–55 cm (20–22 in) long and varies in weight by sex. Females are smaller than males, weighing 680–870 g (24–31 oz), whereas the males weigh 820–970 grams (29–34 oz). The plumage is a dark slate-grey with a greenish sheen on the head, a chestnut-flecked breast. The outer secondaries are tipped with white and the inner ones have black margins. The plumage of the two sexes are mostly the same, although the female has slightly less chestnut in the chest.

It has webbed feet which gives it power to swim in fast-flowing current, and well-developed claws which are suited for rough terrain. Juvenile blue ducks have an oversized feet and legs that helps it to similarly swim in fast currents, and jump onto large rocks and logs. The legs and feet are both dark grey in colour. The upper bill in blue duck has a semicircular soft flap that protects it from abrasion while it engages in dabbling. The tiny comb like structures (or lamellae) around the edge of the bill helps it to feed by diving. During aggressive confrontations or when frightened, the blue duck's bill changes its pale grey color to a distinct pink. The bill is green at hatching and develops its final colour eight hours later. The juvenile blue ducks have a grey iris while the adults possess a yellow one. Their life expectancy is upto 12 years which gets reduced due to predation. The oldest blue duck recorded in the wild lived over 13 years.

=== Song ===
The male's call is a high-pitched whistle. The female's call is a rattling growl or low-pitched grating notes.

== Distribution and habitat ==
In the 18th century when the European voyages to New Zealand became significant, the Blue duck was widespread and abundant in the country. After the human settlement when the forests were being cleared, its population started to decline. Charlie Douglas in 1891 surprised on the blue duck's quick disappearances during an exploration of Waiatoto River remarked that:

The ferrets have not got among the birds on this river evidently, as kakapos are squealing about in hundreds. Will have to tie up the dog if I don’t want the camp full of corpses in the morning. But what is up with the blue ducks? When up here before they were in hundreds, now I have only seen one, and he travelled as if Old Nick was after him.

It was last commonly seen in New Zealand in the 1950s following which its population dwindled because of stoats predating on it. Historical evidence suggests that it once inhabited the offshore islands of New Zealand and not just the North Island and South Island.

The blue duck heavily relies on clean, stable rivers and stream catchments. They are currently located in medium to steep gradient rivers with partial forest cover overhead and vegetation to the riverside. Roosting (or resting) spots are close to the stable undercut of river bank formed by the root system of trees or in log accumulations. A more wider area having tributaries and small disjoint streams is also utilised by the blue duck for activities such as roosting, breeding and moulting. Adult moulting females have been spotted in small streams 3.5 km (2.2 mi) from their territory at 500 m (1,600 ft) above sea level.

Blue duck recording
Recording of adult pair in a stream communicating and answering tape recorded calls.

== Behaviour ==
Blue ducks are found year-round as territorial pairs along a river. Single males occasionally try to take space between separated pairs as new territory. Once the territory is established, it is held by the single male for life. Juvenile or young ducks try to establish their territories near to their natal catchment which leads to high levels of genetic similarity between ducks in a territory. It rarely settles beyond its natal catchment.

=== Diet ===
The blue duck feeds almost entirely on aquatic invertebrate larvae. A study of blue ducks on the Manganuioteao River in the central North Island found the most common prey items were Chironomidae (midge) and cased caddisfly larvae, although cased caddisfly were less preferred and were only consumed so much because of their abundance. Hydrobiosidae (free-living caddisfly) and Aphrophila neozelandica (crane fly) larvae were also frequently eaten. Other prey included mayfly, Aoteapysche (net-building caddis) and stonefly larvae. In addition to these insects, it also consumes silt, periphyton and berries from riverside plants.

=== Foraging ===
Blue duck forages by dabbling on aquatic invertebrates in cold, fast, well oxygenated and clean mountain streams. It dabbles more by scouring rocks than dabbling at the water's surface. Studies have shown that adult territorial blue ducks dabble more than juvenile ones. The stream invertebrates are washed off the rocks in a downstream movement known as invertebrate drift. This drift keeps the food resource renewed for the duck in evenings. Another way to forage that is less commonly used by the blue duck is to dive in stream.

During the diurnal cycle, territorial birds exhibit higher foraging in the early morning and late evening while non–territorial birds tend to forage more at midday. The decrease in foraging by dabbling during midday is because of foraging by diving at that time. This pattern suggests that blue ducks capitalise on invertebrate resources that vary in availability during mid-day and morning or evenings.

Feeding behaviour is influenced by the type of prey available, requiring both tactile and visual foraging techniques. While foraging, blue ducks primarily glean invertebrates from rock surfaces using visual cues for mobile prey such as mayfly larvae. They have forward facing eyes that indicate this visual foraging use which is common of diving ducks. Predator absence had evolved the feature in it to use visual cues. Blue ducks also utilise more tactile cues than visual ones to scrape small chironomid larvae from submerged surfaces. Hence a disruption in water clarity in streams can significantly affect the duck's visual foraging patterns.

A higher availability of food resources makes the duck pairing to be less territorial because the habitat stability will be then increased. Although the food resources are critical for blue duck distribution and population structure, they do not necessarily affect the territorial size.

Male blue ducks are much larger than females and thus have significantly higher daily energy expenditures (DEE), but when size is controlled by expressing DEE as a multiple of basal metabolic rate (BMR), it is found to be equal in both. Ducks living in river channels at higher altitudes had relatively higher DEE than ones with higher channel lengths.

=== Territoriality ===
Blue duck groups keep a long territorial non–overlapping interval as seen in Manganuioteao River with a interval of 1 km. This behaviour secures access to essential resources and optimum breeding sites thereby enhancing reproductive success. During the breeding season, territory defence becomes critical as breeding pairs protect their territories from intruders. Both male and female blue ducks cooperate to defend their territories, using a variety of behaviours to deter intruders. Defensive behaviours include head-low flight, upright, head-bobbing, siphon-feeding and vocalisations. It is important for the pair to defend their territory from intruders because if one loses then the mating pair parts. Also males vocalise much more than female, usually with a "whio" call in morning.

Territoriality in blue ducks is linked to habitat quality. Reduction in invertebrate resource density leads to territoriality being no longer economically viable as defense requires higher food presence. While pairs defend their territories, extensive areas between them may remain unprotected. Juvenile and unpaired blue ducks exploit these undefended spaces for foraging thus showing that territoriality does not completely limit resource availability for unpaired individuals.

In the post breeding season, to reduce economic costs of defending their territories the blue duck pair would constrict their territory size to the most productive areas. Also in this situation, the territory is defended by only one individual from the pair (male). As such in an aggressive confrontation (rank=4), territorial male blue ducks fend off other male intruder ducks to protect their territory.

=== Mating ===
For all year round, both of the monogamous adult pair of blue ducks defend their territories and rear the broods at the same time. After few mating seasons, if a stream reaches the carrying capacity for the ducks then a large number of contiguous territories will be held by closely-related individuals. Thus the mating behaviour of blue ducks leads to enduring pair bonds and permanent territories.

The ducklings when grown up usually loses contact with adult ducks when they are able to fly. In most cases, the moulting and thus successive flightless ability of the adult ducks come after the duckling learns to fly while exceptions do occur. Also if an unpaired male blue duck tries to displace paired mates, changes in mating occur twice–one during the period of incubation and the other during brood raising. These are the defensive actions against the intruder blue ducks.

Fully grown male adults (or Drakes) in a stable environment have higher reproductive variance than in an unstable environment where nest failures (by predators or female infertility) can be high. Also on an average, it takes 35 days for an incubation period and a clutch of 6 eggs are born in each blue duck family.

=== Breeding ===
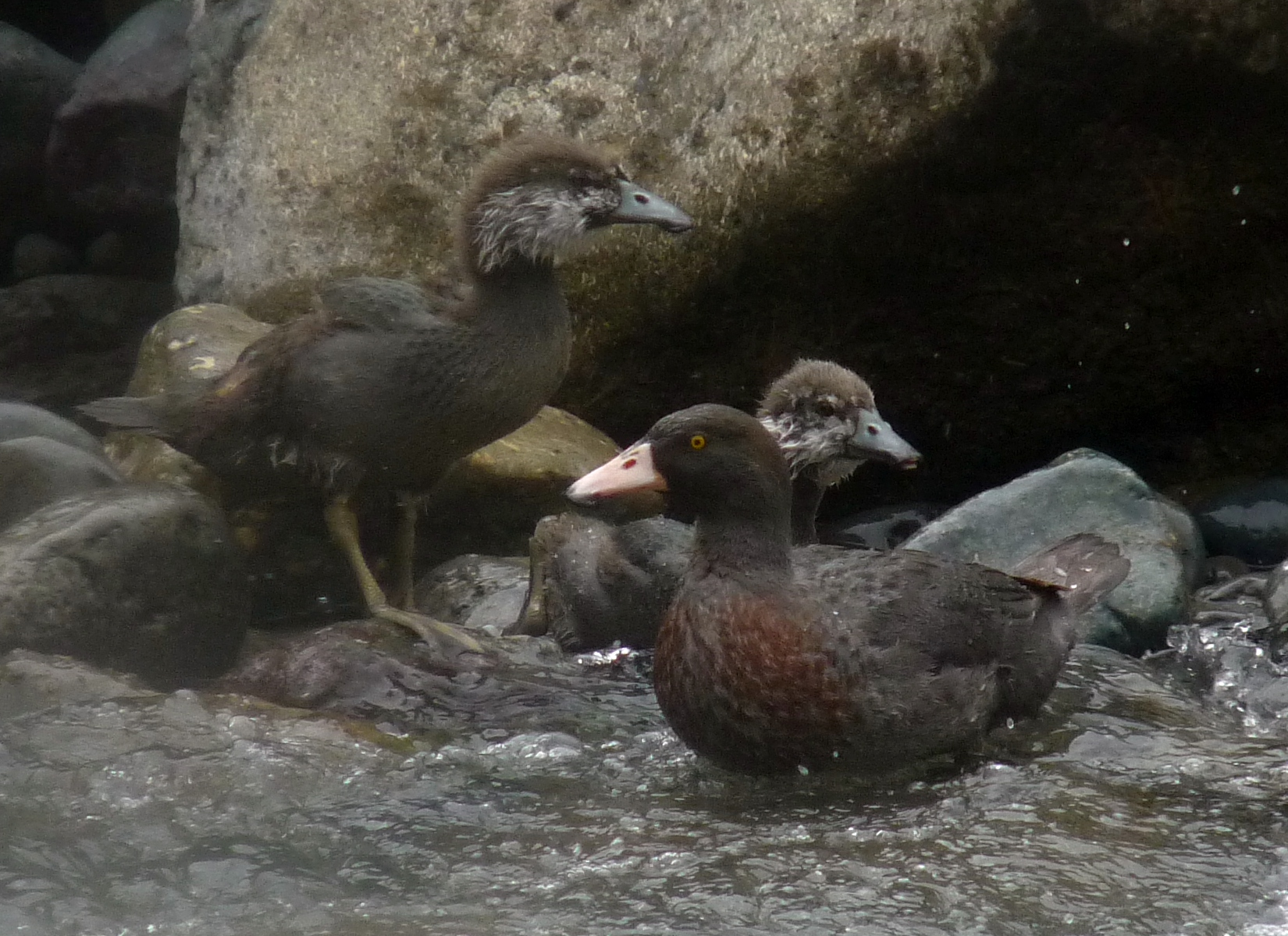
Blue duck family in Hawke's Bay

From August to October, Blue Ducks lay 4–9 white eggs. Also the eggs are of elliptical shape and look shiny. The incubation period is of 35 days and chicks fully fledge after 70 days.

The nesting period of Blue duck occurs between August and December. They builds their nest using sticks and grasses that are found hidden under rocks, caves, logs and in thick riverside vegetation. Also the nests are found in hollow logs, small caves and in wildlife parks such as Staglands Wildlife Reserve. While nesting, they usually lay six eggs and breed within one year.

Female incubate the eggs while the male guards the territory from intruders. The ducklings are reliable enough to hatch while weathering strong water currents. Both of the duck adult pair raises the duckling until the latter is well fledged.

== Captivity ==
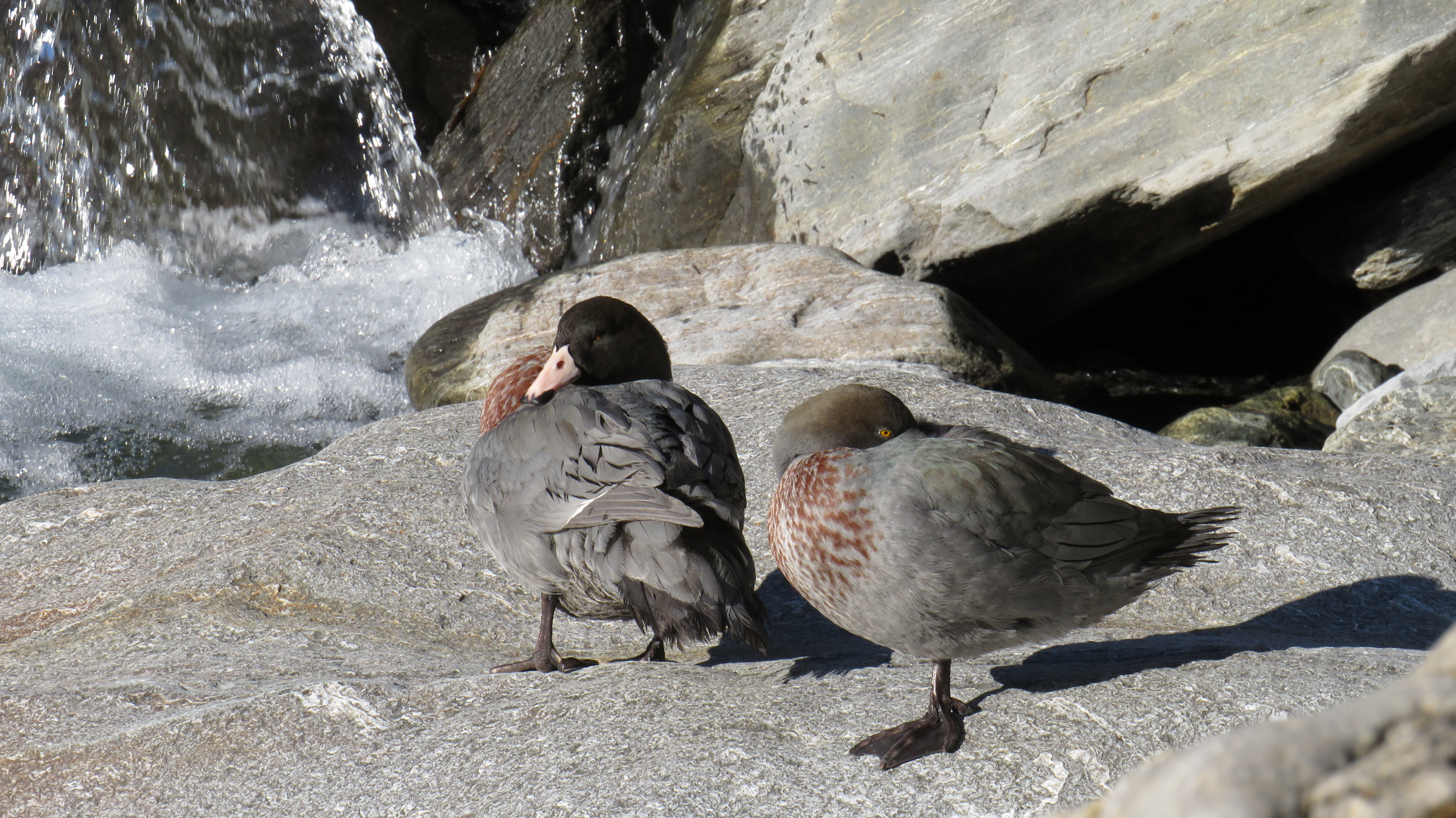
A breeding pair in the wild in the West Coast Region

Captive North Island whio are held and bred on both main islands of New Zealand, but the progeny are returned to their respective island. South Island whio are held and bred in captivity on the South Island only. All captives are kept by approved and permitted zoological and wildlife facilities as part of the national recovery plan. As part of this current ten-year plan (2009–2019) is the WHIONE programme which works with specially trained nose dogs to locate nests. The eggs are removed, and the ducklings hatched and raised in captivity. Later they are conditioned for coordinated release.

Blue ducks were presented to the International Waterfowl Association in the UK in the 1970s along with New Zealand shovelers, New Zealand scaup, and brown teal by The Wildlife Service of New Zealand. The species was maintained in the UK until at least 2012 before dying out; efforts to create the only captive breeding population outside of New Zealand with these ducks ultimately failed when the last two male ducks formed a same-sex relationship with each other instead of with the female that was assigned to them. They have not been known to be exported and maintained anywhere else internationally.

== Status ==
According to the IUCN, the blue duck is endangered due to its highly fragmented and shrinking population, and it is listed as Nationally Endangered in the New Zealand Threat Classification System (NZTCS). A 2010 census estimated a total population size of 2,500–3,000 individuals, with a maximum of 1,200 pairs. A study in 2021 observed that Nationally Endangered species in New Zealand (i.e. of C(1) category) including the Blue duck according to NZTCS, can have a 10 to 50 percent decline in the future.

The blue duck is affected by threats which include predators both natural and introduced for e.g., weka (natural) and stoats (introduced). A 2022 study found that stoats caused a 57 percent mortality in female blue duck population during the period of moulting when it retreats to small tributaries. (Note: In this study, four out of seven female blue ducks were predated by stoats as observed in the duck's moult period which takes place between February and May.) Other notable threats are man-made actions such as poaching, accidents, hydroelectric dams, and environmental and weather conditions such as floods, avalanches and slips. Since its formation in 2002, the whio's recovery efforts by scientists, field workers and volunteers have been organized and led by the Central North Island Blue Duck Trust (CNIBDT) which consists of Genesis Energy, New Zealand Department of Conservation and the Royal Forest and Bird Protection Society. In 2009, the New Zealand Department of Conservation started a ten-year recovery programme to protect the species at eight sites using predator control and then re-establish populations throughout their entire former range. Female whio are especially vulnerable to stoats while nesting, and some populations are now 70 percent male. In one study area, clutches of eggs lasted an average of nine days before being destroyed by stoats, and the one brood that hatched was killed the next day.

In 2011, the New Zealand Department of Conservation and Genesis Energy started the Whio Forever Project, a five-year management programme for whio. It will enable the implementation of a national recovery plan that will double the number of fully operational secure blue duck breeding sites throughout New Zealand, and boost pest control efforts. It is also found that population stability of blue ducks can be achieved in winter and breeding season when aquatic invertebrates are abundant. This is further complemented by the aerial 1080 operations for Bovine tuberculosis (Bovine TB) control, which is done by TBfree New Zealand and the New Zealand Department of Conservation. The Bovine TB control and predator trapping thus ensures a predator free environment for the blue duck.

The blue duck (or whio) is also depicted on the reverse side of the New Zealand $10 banknote.
