= Terrestrial ecosystem =

Ecological system found on land

Terrestrial ecosystems are ecosystems that are found on land. Examples include tundra, taiga, temperate deciduous forest, tropical rain forest, grassland, deserts.

Terrestrial ecosystems differ from aquatic ecosystems by the predominant presence of soil rather than water at the surface and by the extension of plants above this soil/water surface in terrestrial ecosystems. There is a wide range of water availability among terrestrial ecosystems (including water scarcity in some cases), whereas water is seldom a limiting factor to organisms in aquatic ecosystems. Because water buffers temperature fluctuations, terrestrial ecosystems usually experience greater diurnal and seasonal temperature fluctuations than do aquatic ecosystems in similar climates.

Terrestrial ecosystems are of particular importance especially in meeting Sustainable Development Goal 15 that targets the conservation-restoration and sustainable use of terrestrial ecosystems.

== Organisms and processes ==
Organisms in terrestrial ecosystems have adaptations that allow them to obtain water when the entire body is no longer bathed in that fluid, means of transporting the water from limited sites of acquisition to the rest of the body, and means of preventing the evaporation of water from body surfaces. They also have traits that provide body support in the atmosphere, a much less buoyant medium than water, and other traits that render them capable of withstanding the extremes of temperature, wind, and humidity that characterize terrestrial ecosystems. Finally, the organisms in terrestrial ecosystems have evolved many methods of transporting gametes in environments where fluid flow is much less effective as a transport medium. This is terrestrial ecosystems.

Common Types of Terrestrial Plants

Four main groupings for terrestrial plants are bryophytes, pteridophytes, gymnosperms, and angiosperms, have been existing for many years and have allowed diversity into our ecosystems .

== Size and plants ==
Terrestrial ecosystems occupy 55,660,000 mi^{2} (144,150,000 km^{2}), or 28.26% of Earth's surface. Major plant taxa in terrestrial ecosystems are members of the division Magnoliophyta (flowering plants), of which there are about 275,000 species, and the division Pinophyta (conifers), of which there are about 500 species. Members of the division Bryophyta (mosses and liverworts), of which there are about 24,000 species, are also important in some terrestrial ecosystems. Major animal taxa in terrestrial ecosystems include the classes Insecta (insects) with about 900,000 species, Aves (birds) with 8,500 species, and Mammalia (mammals) with approximately 4,100 species.

== See also ==
- Aquatic-terrestrial subsidies
- Colonization of land - history of terrestrial life
- Soil ecology
