= Yarrawalla =

- Town
- Coordinates: 36°9′20″S 144°1′37″E
- Country: Australia
- State: Victoria
- LGA: Shire of Loddon

Government
  - State electorate: Murray Plains
  - Federal division: Mallee

Population
  - Total: 78 (2021 census)
- Postcode: 3575

Yarrawalla is a locality in the Shire of Loddon, Victoria, Australia. At the 2021 census, Yarrawalla had a population of 78.

== History ==
Yarrawalla is derived from an Aboriginal name for the blue parakeet or blue winged parakeet. According to local Aboriginal tradition, Yarrawalla was the home of the blue parakeet, though the bird is now rarely seen in the district. Before European colonisation, the Yarrawalla area lay within the traditional lands of the Dja Dja Wurrung (to the south) and the Barapa Barapa (to the north). The region's black box swamps and grassy plains provided kangaroos, possums, yams, wattle seeds, and cumbungi reeds, which were roasted for starch. Remnants of campfire sites and artifacts remain in the area. By the 1870s, closer colonisation had forced the last Indigenous groups from the locality.

Explorer Major Thomas Mitchell claimed to be the first European in the area; his route from Pyramid Hill to the Loddon River crossing suggests that his party travelled through Yarrawalla. Squatters arrived at Durham Ox in 1838, and cattle grazed the district until the area was opened to colonisation in 1870. With the growth of the settler population, the first school opened in 1875, serving the children of European families. The first church, the Bible Christian Church, was built the same year; it later became a Methodist church and was eventually moved to Yarrawalla South. The railway reached Pyramid Hill in 1884, the Shire of Gordon was formed in 1885, and irrigation began in 1886. Unseasonal rain in December 1886 damaged hay crops and delayed harvesting and some farmers expressed dissatisfaction with delays to the No. 1 canal under the Tragowel irrigation scheme.

In February 1888 rust and wind were reported to have damaged grain crops in the Yarrawalla district during the preceding season. Some farmers reported experimenting with irrigation from the No. 6 main canal, with one achieving approximately four bags per acre on well-watered portions of his crop. In June 1889 farmers in the district considered establishing a cheese factory or creamery, though butter prices had recently fallen. The first organised sporting event, a cricket match, was held in 1897, telecommunications arrived in 1924, and electricity was connected in 1958. Salinity problems began to be noticed in the locality in the late 1950s.

Yarrawalla was severely affected by floods in 2011 and again in 2022, with surrounding farms impacted to varying degrees but few houses were affected. The Yarrawalla Uniting Church was decommissioned in November 2013.
