= Cross-boundary subsidy =

Ecological concept

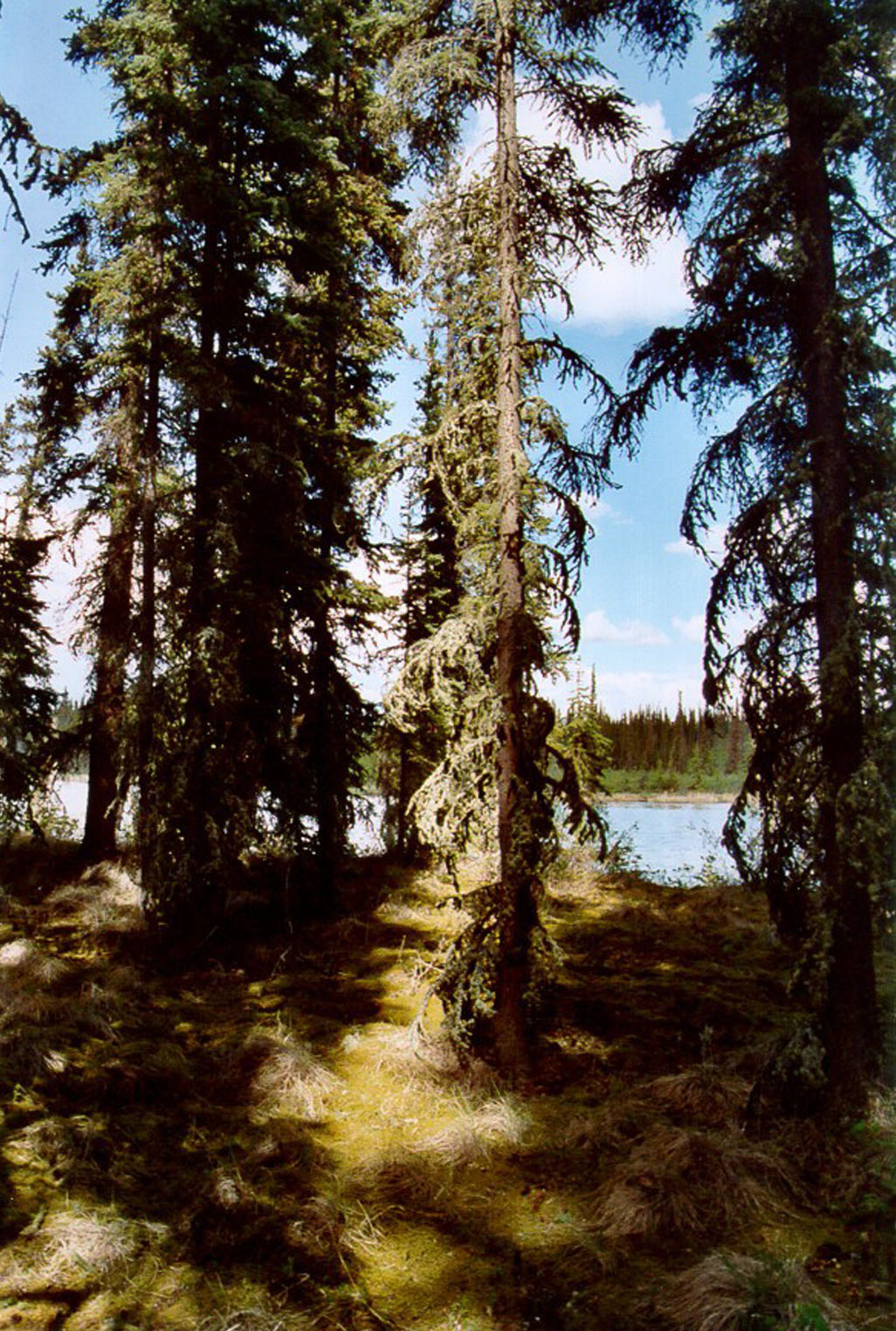
Alaskan boreal forest in Yukon National Wildlife Refuge

Cross-boundary subsidies are caused by organisms or materials that cross or traverse habitat patch boundaries, subsidizing the resident populations. The transferred organisms and materials may provide additional predators, prey, or nutrients to resident species, which can affect community and food web structure. Cross-boundary subsidies of materials and organisms occur in landscapes composed of different habitat patch types, and so depend on characteristics of those patches and on the boundaries between them. Human alteration of the landscape, primarily through fragmentation, has the potential to alter important cross-boundary subsidies to increasingly isolated habitat patches. Understanding how processes that occur outside of habitat patches can affect populations within them may be important to habitat management.

== Introduction and development of the concept ==
The concept of cross-boundary subsidies developed out of a merging of ideas from the studies of landscape ecology and food web ecology. The ideas from landscape ecology allow the study of population, community, and food web dynamics to incorporate spatial relationships between landscape elements into an understanding of such dynamics (Polis et al. 1997).

Janzen (1986) first defined cross-boundary subsidies as a process whereby organisms that disperse from one patch into another impact resident organisms by providing increased food resources or opportunities for reproduction, thus serving as a subsidy to the residents. By this definition, only the cross-boundary movement of organisms is considered, but broader definitions of cross-boundary subsidies can also include materials such as nutrients and detritus (i.e. Marburg et al. 2006, Facelli and Pickett 1991).

Cross-boundary subsidies are a subset of the more general process of spatial subsidies (see Polis et al. 1997). Cross-boundary subsidies acknowledge the presence and role of the boundary between different habitat patches in mediating flows of organisms and materials. In contrast, spatial subsidies require only that external inputs of materials and organisms originate from outside the patch of interest.

=== Conceptual models ===
Few attempts have been made to combine landscape and food web ecology in such a way that explicitly recognizes the importance of cross-boundary subsidies and spatial features of the landscape on food web dynamics. Often, spatial subsidies are treated as subsidies that simply arrive from outside the patch of interest, not addressing the landscape patterns and processes that may affect the movement of these inputs, such as boundary characteristics and patch connectivity. Polis et al. (1997) published a thorough review of spatially subsidized food web dynamics, focusing on the effect of subsidies on population, community, consumer-resource, and food web dynamics. One of the main conclusions was that subsidies of consumer species (organisms that eat other organisms to obtain energy) resulted in declines of food resources in the recipient patch. Callaway and Hastings (2002) built off Polis et al.’s conclusion with a model to show that subsidized consumers may not always drive down the resource in the recipient patch if consumers move between patches frequently. This might occur because consumers often move for reasons other than food resource acquisition.

Cadenasso et al. (2003) developed a framework for studying ecological boundaries, which has implications for understanding the dynamics of specific cross-boundary subsidies. The boundary is defined as the zone of the steepest gradient of change in some characteristic from one patch to another, such as rapidly decreasing light levels as habitat transitions from a field to a forest. In this framework, flows across variable landscapes are characterized by the type of flow (materials, energy, organisms, etc.), patch contrast (architecture, composition, process), and boundary structure (architecture, composition, symbolic and perceptual features). Considering a cross-boundary subsidy in terms of this framework shows how the boundary itself can mediate the subsidy. For example, Cadenasso and Pickett (2001) found that the decreased lateral vegetation at the boundary between a forest and field increased the amount of seeds transferred into the forest interior.

Another conceptual model that specifically considers cross-boundary subsidies is a model developed by Rand et al. (2006) of spillover from agriculture to wildland patches by predatory insects. The edge is permeable to insects that are habitat generalists and therefore capable of easily crossing the boundary between agriculture and wildland patches, whereas it is considered impermeable to insects that specialize on a particular patch type and cannot cross the boundary. In this model, edge permeability (habitat specialists vs. generalists), patch productivity, and complementary resource use (use of resources obtained in both agriculture and wildland patches) determine the expected impact of cross-boundary subsidies by predatory insects (Fig. 1).

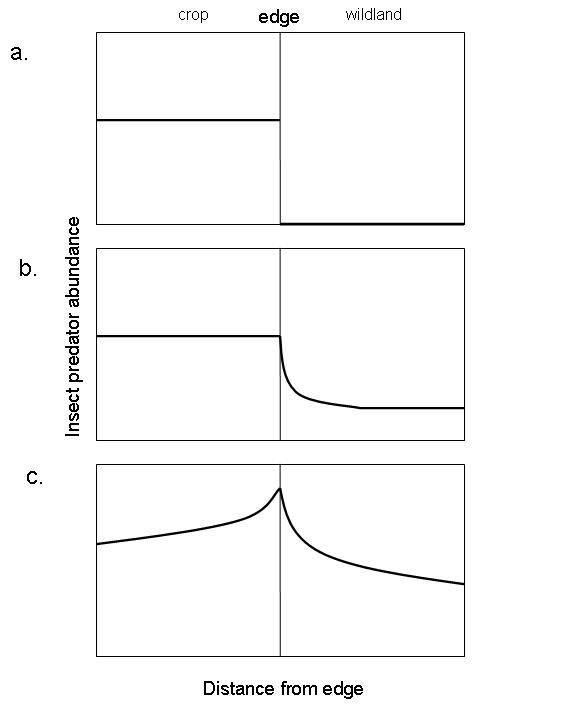
Figure 1. Conceptual model of cross-boundary subsidies of insect predators from agricultural to adjacent wildland patches. a. Habitat specialization, the boundary is a hard edge to predators such that they do not disperse to the wildland patch. b. Differences in productivity, increased productivity in the agricultural patch allows a generalist insect predator to disperse to the lower productivity wildland patch. This is an example of a directional positive edge response. c. Complementary resource use, insect predator abundance is highest near the edge because they need resources present in both patches. This is an example of a reciprocal positive edge response. Redrawn from Rand et al. 2006.

== Relation to selected ecological concepts ==
=== Landscape ecology ===
A spatial subsidy, in the context of landscape ecology, is a doner-mediated resource (nutrient, detritus, prey) which is passed from one habitat to a recipient (consumer) in a second habitat. As a result, the productivity of the recipient is increased (Polis et al., 1997). For example, a bear eats a salmon and acquires the resources that have passed through the marine environment across the habitat boundary and into a terrestrial environment.

=== Source sink dynamics ===
The idea of a subsidy of materials or organisms across a patch boundary affecting resident populations has clear parallels with source-sink dynamics (Fagan et al. 1999). In this theory, local populations are connected by dispersal, and the extinction of local populations can be prevented through immigration from neighboring patches (Pulliam 1988). In source-sink dynamics, it is assumed that individuals from more productive patches will move to less productive patches with unsustainable populations (Pulliam 1988). Many examples of cross-boundary subsidies can be thought of as exhibiting source-sink dynamics. Rand et al. (2006) found that insects in a high productivity agricultural patch were able to sustain local populations in a lower productivity wildland patch through continued dispersal from the agricultural patch. The effect of these subsidies to local patches can also impact populations of other species in the recipient food web, because the subsidized population may compete with or prey upon other species more effectively than they would be able to without such an influx (Fagan et al. 1999).

=== Biotic interactions and trophic structure ===
Cross-boundary subsidies have important impacts on species interactions and food web dynamics. Subsidies of materials and organisms can affect all trophic, or feeding, levels of food webs either directly or indirectly. Inputs of nutrient and detritus from another patch generally increase the population growth of the resident producers (plants) and detritivores (Polis et al. 1997). Increased growth at the producer level can result in a bottom-up trophic effect, in which increases in populations at lower trophic levels support a higher population of consumers than would otherwise be possible in a closed system (Polis et al. 1997). allochthonous detrital inputs can also have strong impacts on food web dynamics over a variety of temporal scales, ranging from seconds to millennia, as in the case of fossil fuel formation from build-up of detritus over millennia (Moore et al. 2004).

==== Coarse woody debris ====
Many food webs rely on cross-boundary subsidies of detritus for sources of energy and nutrients (Huxel and McCann 1998). For example, a series of lakes in Wisconsin were examined for the presence of coarse woody debris (CWD) and the characteristics of the surrounding landscape that might control its input to lakes. Coarse woody debris in these lakes is important for providing habitat and food resources for a variety of organisms including small fish (Werner and Hall 1988), algae, and detritivores (Bowen et al. 1998). Marburg et al. (2006) compared variation within and among lakes in CWD. They found that subsidies of CWD to lakes were lower when the lakes had human development along the shore. Development along the lakeshore can be thought of as an alteration to the characteristics of the patch boundary between the lake and forest. In this case, development decreased both forest density that is the source of CWD and also the permeability of the boundary to flows of CWD (Marburg et al. 2006).

==== Predator-prey ====
In addition to bottom-up effects, top-down effects may also occur due to cross-boundary subsidies. In top-down effects, subsidies of consumers at the top level of the food web control populations at lower levels more so than would be expected by only the action of resident consumers (Polis et al. 1997). Consumers that cross boundaries may have a greater effect on the recipient patch population if prey in the recipient patch have a lower population growth rate than prey in the source patch (Fagan et al. 1999, Rand et al. 2006). Thus, cross-boundary subsidies may alter predator-prey/competitive interactions that can result in a disproportionate impact on the communities of the recipient patch.

==== Trophic cascade ====
In subsidizing top trophic levels, effects may also be felt at all lower trophic levels in a phenomenon known as a trophic cascade. An example of a trophic cascade that also acted as a cross-boundary subsidy is illustrated in a study by Knight et al. (2005) in which changes in the trophic structure of one ecosystem resulted in an effect that cascaded to the adjacent ecosystem. In ponds containing fish, dragonfly larvae were kept to a minimum by fish predation. The resulting low density of adult dragonfly predators led to a high density of bee pollinators. With fish present in adjacent ponds, bees were able to pollinate more flowers in the adjacent upland ecosystem than they were when fish were absent. The dragonfly population could be thought of as subsidized by the absence of fish predation. That subsidy was then transferred across the pond-upland boundary by adult dragonfly movement to affect the interaction between bee pollinators and plants.

=== Subsidy cascade ===
Native species that forage on resources that don't originate in their same habitat. This may increase their local abundances thereby affecting other species in the ecosystem. For example, Luskin et al. (2017) found that native animals living protected primary rainforest in Malaysia found food subsidies in neighboring oil palm plantations. This subsidy allowed native animal populations to increase, which then triggered powerful secondary ‘cascading’ effects on forest tree community. Specifically, crop-raiding wild boar (Sus scrofa) built thousands of nests from the forest understory vegetation and this caused a 62% decline in forest tree sapling density over a 24-year study period. Such cross-boundary subsidy cascades may be widespread in both terrestrial and marine ecosystems and present significant conservation challenges.

== Human activities affecting cross-boundary subsidies ==
=== Agriculture ===
Native species that forage in farmland may increase their local abundances thereby affecting adjacent ecosystems within their landscape. For example, Luskin et al. (2017) used two decades of ecological data from a protected primary rainforest in Malaysia to illustrate how subsidies from neighboring oil palm plantations triggered powerful secondary ‘cascading’ effects on natural habitats located >1.3 km away. They found that (i) oil palm fruit drove 100-fold increases in crop-raiding native wild boar (Sus scrofa), (ii) wild boar used thousands of understory plants to construct birthing nests in the pristine forest interior, and (iii) nest building caused a 62% decline in forest tree sapling density over the 24-year study period. The long-term, landscape-scale indirect effects from agriculture suggest its full ecological footprint may be larger in extent than is currently recognized. Cross-boundary subsidy cascades may be widespread in both terrestrial and marine ecosystems and present significant conservation challenges.

=== Fragmentation ===
As landscapes become increasingly fragmented due to human activity, the influence of patch boundaries on individual patches becomes relatively more important (Murcia 1995). fragmentation can both cut off necessary subsidies to patches and increase the magnitude of subsidies from adjacent patches. For example, in a study of fragmentation of wildlands in an agriculturally dominated landscape, subsidies of habitat specialist insects to wildland patches were prevented by surrounding small, wildland patches with inhospitable agricultural land. This isolation reduced the potential for gene flow and long-term persistence of the population. Subsidies of other insects that specialized on agricultural crops were increased to wildland populations, increasing their effect on the resident wildland species (Duelli 1990).

=== Alteration of patch and boundary characteristics ===
Changing the internal structure and composition of a patch may substantially alter cross-boundary subsidies. Logging may temporarily increase subsidies of nutrients and detritus to adjacent streams (Likens et al. 1970). Invasive species introduced to agricultural patches may act as a subsidy to adjacent wildland invasive populations, preventing native species establishment, even within the protected area (Janzen 1983).

==== Marine systems ====
Human alterations of patch characteristics may also curtail cross-boundary subsidies such as overfishing in marine systems, which may drastically reduce potentially crucial marine subsidies of organisms to freshwater and riparian systems (Zhang et al. 2003). For example, Helfield and Naiman (2002) found that riparian trees in Alaska obtain 24–26% of their nitrogen from marine sources, transferred from migrating salmon. In this system, salmon that feed in the ocean, incorporating marine nitrogen into their biomass, later return to their natal small streams where they spawn and die. Salmon carcasses transferred across the stream-riparian zone boundary by terrestrial predators or flooding events subsidized growth of terrestrial plants. Thus, marine overfishing may affect the productivity of Alaskan forests that depend on subsidies of marine-derived nitrogen.

As discussed above, cross-boundary subsidies depend on the characteristics of the patch boundary. Human-induced changes in these characteristics can affect boundary permeability to certain organisms or materials. For example, a cross-boundary subsidy of leaf litter from forest to an adjacent open field may be attenuated at the boundary if a road is present, making the boundary less permeable to flows of leaf litter (Facelli and Pickett 1991).

== Implications for management and future research needs ==
Habitat management might benefit from recognizing the effect that humans may have on both individual patches and on the dynamics between patches. In such cases, managers may need to focus on patterns and processes that occur outside of their patch of interest, as these factors may also be important to internal population dynamics. An understanding of boundary features that influence the various flows of interest is necessary in managing for those flows.

=== Invasive species ===
The implications of invasive species and the use of biological control agents may also be closely related to the idea of cross-boundary subsidies. Introducing species into one patch for biocontrol may have unforeseen consequences on dynamics within adjacent patches.

Other fields, such as public policy, can also benefit from considering cross-boundary subsidies. For example, governments often provide financial subsidies to fisheries, which have a negative effect on those ecosystems by encouraging overfishing (Munro and Sumaila 2002). Understanding what processes affect how those financial resources flow across that particular government-industry boundary is important to the maintenance of marine food webs. Considering cross-boundary effects will be essential to a complete understanding of potential consequences of human action on the landscape.
