= Invertebrate drift =

Downstream transport of invertebrate organisms in rivers and streams

Invertebrate drift is the downstream transport of invertebrate organisms in lotic freshwater systems such as rivers and streams. The term lotic comes from the Latin word lotus, meaning "washing", and is used to describe moving freshwater systems. This is in contrast with lentic coming from the Latin word lentus, meaning slow or motionless that typically describe still or standing waters such as lakes, ponds, and swamps.

Drift can service freshwater invertebrates by giving them an escape route from predation, or the use of a current to disperse progeny downstream. On occasion, however, invertebrates will inadvertently lose their footing, and drift downstream. For that, invertebrates counter a stream's flow through physical and behavioral adaptations. And just as invertebrates adapted to stabilize themselves in the water column, or use the stream's energy to their advantage, so too have predators adapted to catch invertebrates as they drift. Species of fish, commonly salmonids, catch drifting insects during the peak times after dusk, and before dawn. Fishermen can exploit this relationship using fly fishing techniques and lures that mimic drifting insects to catch these fishes.

Researchers have developed sampling techniques in lotic systems. From it, research as far back as 1928 has collected data on the phenomenon of drift. The study of invertebrate drift has progressed the field of stream ecology. Drift has been documented to impact community structure, benthic production, and the energy flow through trophic levels.

== Mechanisms of drift ==
=== Types of drift ===
Invertebrate drift can be categorized by the conditions that caused the drift to occur.

- Catastrophic drift: Disturbances such as floods physically dislodge animals.
- Behavioral drift: Behavior such as escaping, and inadvertently losing foothold in the water column, cause animals to drift downstream. Active drift describes animals choosing to enter drift.
- Distributional drift: Used by animals to disperse progeny downstream.
- Constant drift: Also known as background drift, describes a low, consistent rate of drifting invertebrates between temporal peaks.
- Emergence drift: Nymphs and pupae drift as they swim to the surface to emerge into their adult stage.
- Surface drift: Adult insects drift as they emerge on the surface of the river and drift when adult insects return to the surface to lay eggs.

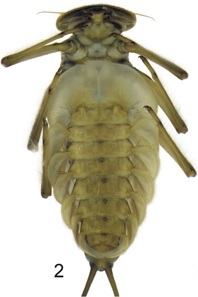
Friction disk.

=== Species associated with drift ===
Invertebrate species adapt to a stream's current through the organs or appendages that physically attach them to the substrate, or association with large boulders or thick plant growth to buffer the disturbances associated with flow. An example of the former is the family Heptageniidae in the order Ephemeroptera. Larvae within the genus have modified gills forming a friction disc that allows them to cling to the substrate in rapid moving waters. An example of the friction disk can be seen on the image to the right which shows the ventral side of a species within the genus epeorus.

Müller (1954) found that water mites (Hydracarina) and aquatic beetles (Coleoptera) made up a large portion of the benthos population in the stream Skravelbäcken of Sweden, but since they associated with boulders and thick plant growth, they avoid being dislodged by water currents into drift.

=== Drift-feeding predation ===
Many predators of common insects and invertebrates found in streams feed off of those found in stream drift. Many of these predators have adapted or have become specialized to feeding on invertebrates found in stream drift. Predators that use this as their main source for food, typically fish, are called drift-feeders.

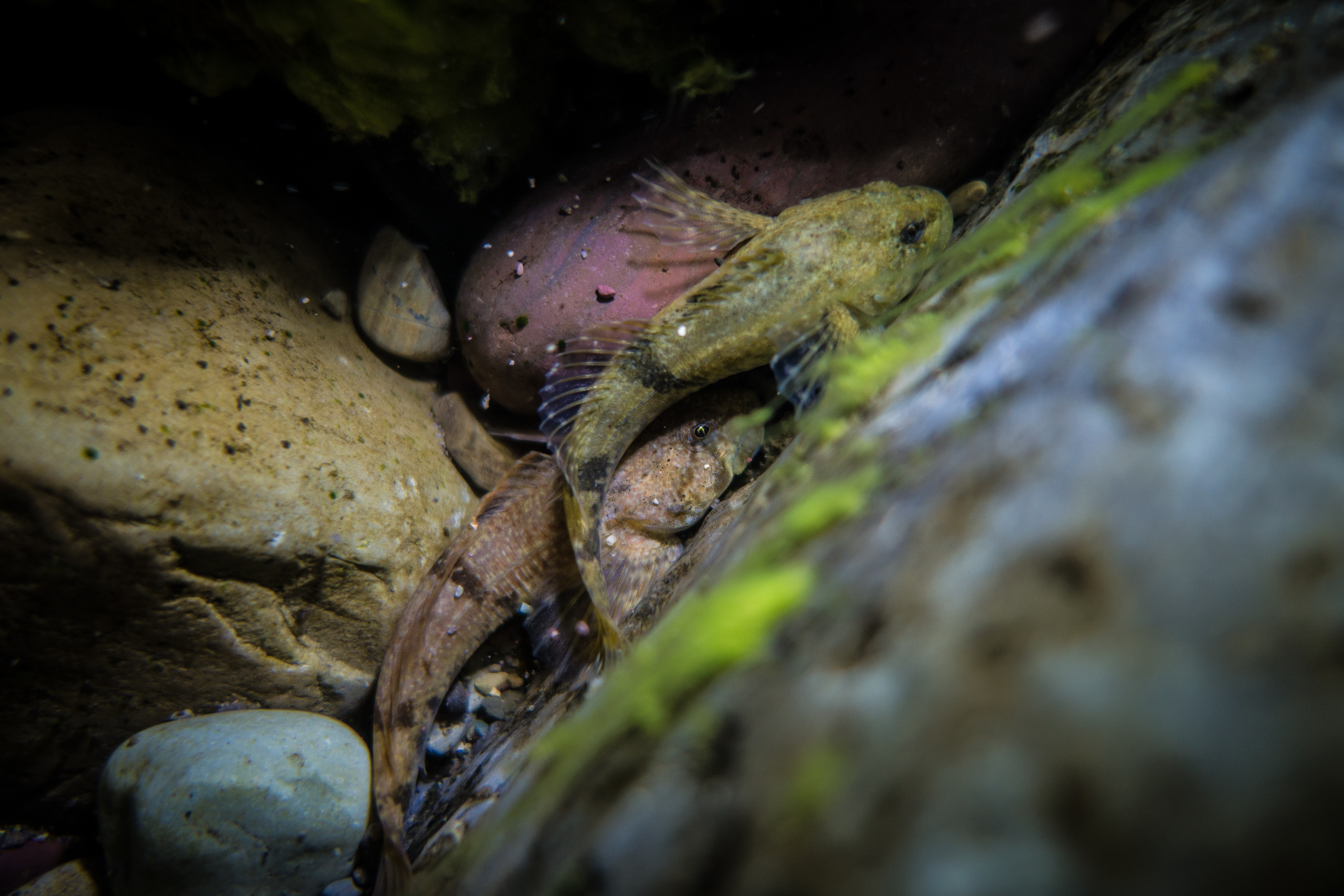
Sculpin are bottom feeders that look for insects drifting near the substrate

The most common example of drift-feeding predators are stream salmonids, especially trout. These fish catch a lot of their prey during dusk and dawn. This has led to studies concluding that many invertebrates have adapted to drifting at night, where they can avoid predation due to these fish being mainly visual hunters.

Other fish, such as the sculpin, have evolved with highly developed lateral lines, allowing them to have better nocturnal predation skills. As such, sculpins were found to catch a majority of their prey at night, as well as during the day.

Fish predation on invertebrate has been seen to alter prey densities in streams by individual feeding of insects or by effecting insect dispersal behavior.

==== Avoidance ====
Common invertebrate species have adapted drifting behaviors to help avoid predation. The biggest example, as mentioned before, is to drift at night. However, invertebrate have adapted to change their drift behavior to avoid predation after receiving other certain signals and indicators. For example, the mayfly Baetis bicaudatis was shown to change its behavior based on odors chemically released in the water system similar to fish predators.

==== Non-piscine predation ====
Although fish are the main predators of invertebrates in stream drift, there are others as well, such as birds and large insects. For example, the white-throated dipper Cinclus cinclus, is an aquatic bird that feeds off of invertebrates in stream drift. Another example is the stonefly, which is a large insect that has been found to prey on other small drifting insects, such as the mayfly.

=== Environmental factors affecting invertebrate drift ===
Changes to the environment as a result of abiotic factors can lead to both increases and decreases of invertebrate drift. Factors such as a reduction of stream flow can lead to an increase of invertebrate drift, as observed by Minshall and Winger in their 1968 study. They found that as stream flow and the frequency had an inverse relationship over the course of July, August, and September in the Rocky Mountains of Idaho.

Koetsier and Bryan sought to assess the effect of abiotic factors on invertebrate drift in the lower Mississippi river. Just as with Minshall and Winger, they found that there was a negative correlation between stream discharge and frequency of invertebrate drift. According to their 1995 study, river discharge could be attributed to approximately 40% of variation in the taxa of invertebrates which are more prone to drift.

Invertebrate drift is also affected by the day/night cycle. At night invertebrate drift can be up to 10 times higher than during the day. Benke et al. found that all of the invertebrates that they sampled had a consistency to be more active in the drift at night especially during the summer. They found that this pattern of drift happening at night continued all throughout the year, but that the extent of the difference in drift between day and night was not as exaggerated as during the summer. Benke et al. also found that in southern states the invertebrate drift is more abundant and consistent which is largely attributed to the fact that there is not a sharp decline in temperature during winter like happens in more northern states.

== Drift research ==
=== History of drift research ===
The concept of drift can be traced back to 1928 where an experiment conducted by P. R. Needham of Cornell University sought to quantify allochthonous animal material in various stream environments. Needham used drift and stop nets to collect available drifting material and organisms and calculated the collection based on the area length of stream reaches. The study served as a proof of concept for use of these methods for future quantitative and qualitative ecological studies of drifting organisms.

After a period of dormancy, there was a resurgence on the research of drift in the 1950s and 1960s. A prominent paper of the time was Müller's 1954 Investigations on the organic drift in North Sweden streams. Müller proposed the term "colonization cycle" after observing the upper stream reaches in Sweden were recolonizing quickly despite their progeny's physical inability to migrate against a current. To counter competition, immature organisms disperse downstream then migrated back upstream as adults to spawn, thus, replenishing populations.

In the early 1960s, research done by Hikaru Tanaka, Thomas F. Walters, and Karl Müller discovered that invertebrate drift followed a distinct diel periodicity. In Walter’ 1962 paper "Diurnal Periodicity in the Drift of Stream Invertebrates", Walters measured the high volume of drifting scuds (Gammarus limnaeus) over 24 hours within four different months spanning each of the seasons. Uniformly, across August, October, February, and May, there was a notable increase in drift 1 hour after sunset and a notable decrease an hour before sunrise. In August specifically, there was a significant spike in scud volume after sunset reaching numbers of 100-fold of that caught a few hours prior. Walters measured other species caught like mayflies (Baetis vagans), caddisflies (Glossosoma intermedium), and water boatman adults (Hesperocorixa sp.) and they all displayed a similar pattern of diurnal periodicity. Walters hypothesized that the higher drift rates coincided with higher invertebrate activity during the night, and as the invertebrates moved around freely, they were swept downstream by the current.

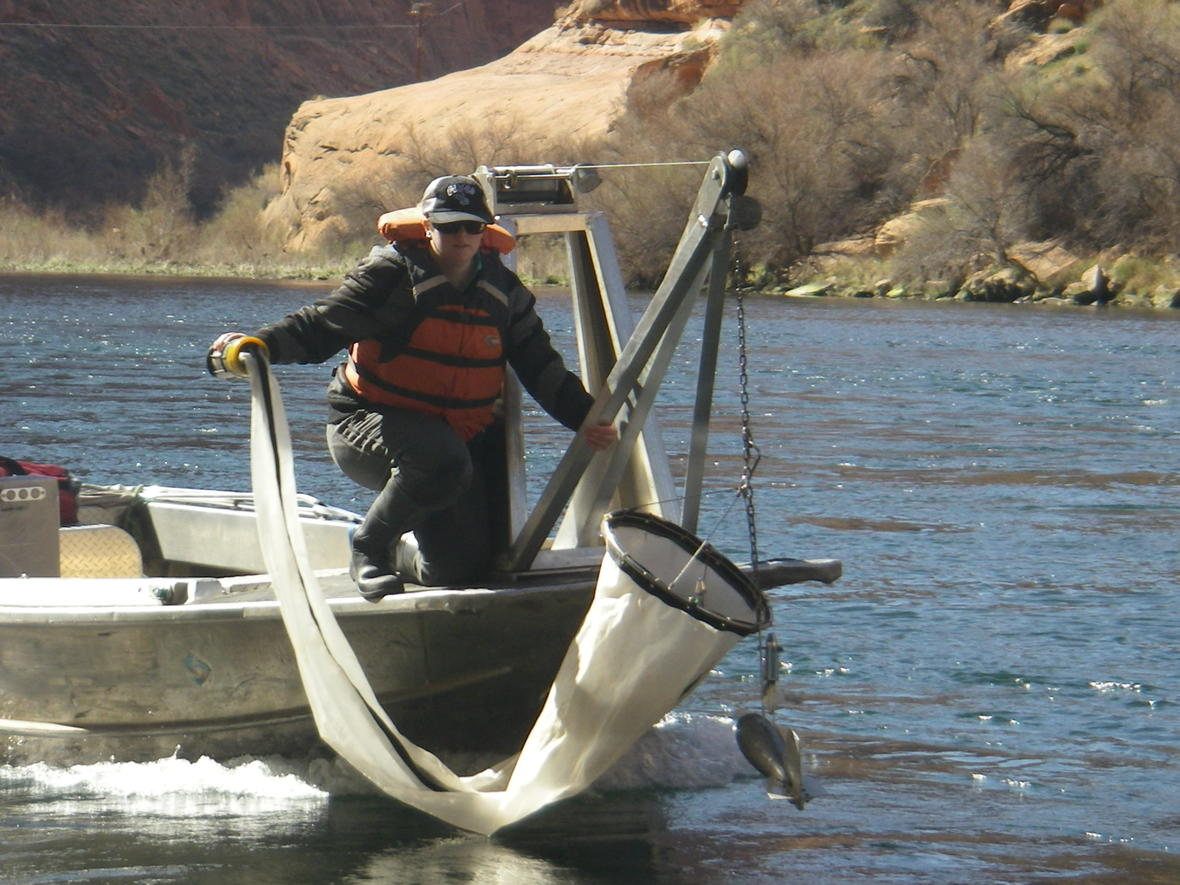
Sampler with flow meter.

=== Methods of sampling ===
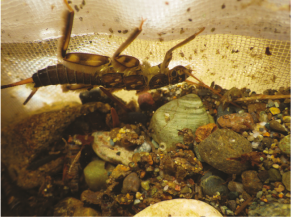
Use of sampler without a flow meter to capture invertebrates.

There are three well used methods for sampling invertebrate drift: samplers with flow meters, samplers without flow meters, and tube samplers. Invertebrate drift is observed to function on 24-hour intervals.

- Samplers with flow meters, this type of method will simultaneously measure water volume entering the sampler. This sampler can be enclosed in a metal cylinder and held parallel to the stream bed with support. Disadvantages of this particular sampler is that they are unable to capture drift invertebrates that lie on the surface, that usually enter the stream from terrestrial land.
- Samplers without flow meters are long nets with a square mouth. The top of the net is above the water surface while the bottom edge is at the bottom of the stream. There are two iron rods that hold the net in place and are placed in the stream bed. Disadvantage for this type of sampler is there is a possibility that the net can become clogged which yields back-flow. This will decrease efficiency and by having the net located close to the stream bed there is a possibility that non-drift organisms have the chance to enter the net.
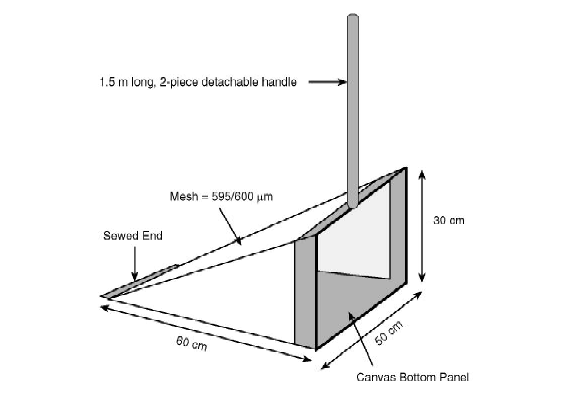
  Sampler without flow meter
  The image to the left is an example of a sampler without flow meter.

Tube samplers are used to pass stream discharge ending in the air above a filtering net. Therefore, the tube will be extended out of the water allowing water to exit and flow through a net filtering all invertebrates. Advantages to this method is there is a rarity of back flow. Disadvantages to this method involve invertebrates that have the ability to survive in the tube without being transferred through the filter. This can be solved by cleaning the tube after gathering sufficient data.

The efficiency of these methods has been confirmed. Although, there are many factors that control samplers, it is believed that samplers maintain "laminar flow and do not significantly affect the velocity of water at the mouth." These models sample drift at close to maximum efficiency.

== Human use of invertebrate drift ==
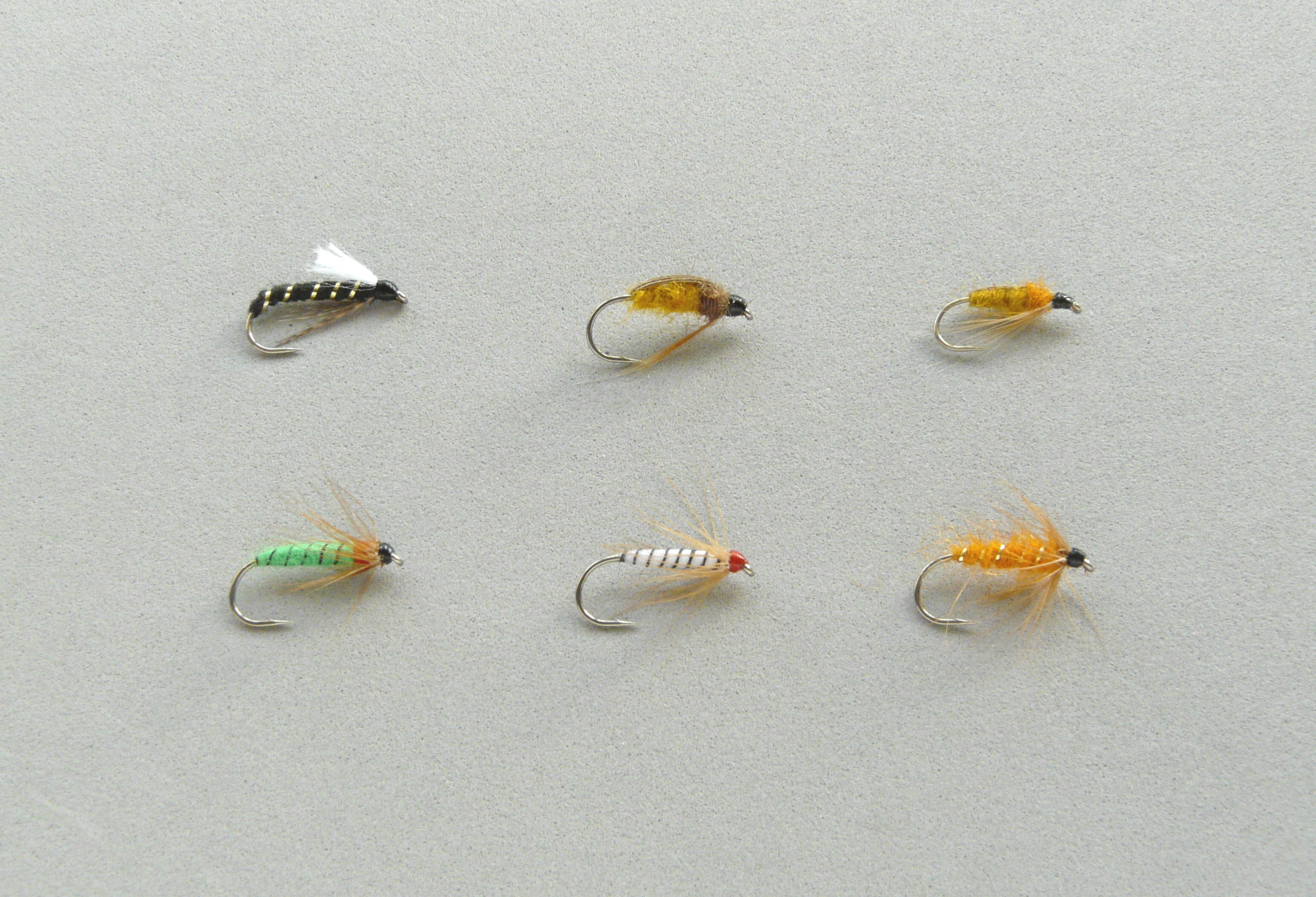
Nymph patterns

=== Fly fishing ===
Fly fishing is a method of angling that uses lures composed of hair, feathers, and synthetic materials that mimics a fly, bug, or other prey items. Using a long rod, typically between 7 and 11 feet (2 to 3.5 meters), the angler snaps the rod back and forth allowing the lure to rest just above the water's surface before flicking back. The method described is referred to as dry-fly fishing as the lure is on or above the water. In contrast, there is wet-fly fishing where the lure sits on or beneath the water's surface. In wet-fly fishing, the angler casts their lure upstream allowing the current to carry the fly, whether submerged or on the surface, downstream to the target trout.

A wet fly-fishing technique known as nymph fishing (or nymphing) is used commonly to catch trout who feed on drifting nymphs in shallow riffles. Anglers take advantage of invertebrate drift and cast their lines with a mimic nymph fly upstream and allow the river's current to carry their submerged lure downstream to where the trout are waiting to catch their prey.
