= John McKenzie (philanthropist) =

New Zealand businessman and philanthropist

Sir John McKenzie KBE
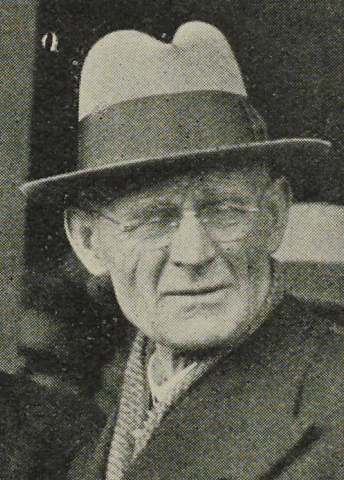
- McKenzie in 1937
- Born: John Robert Hugh McKenzie; 5 August 1876; Yarrawalla, Victoria, Australia
- Died: 26 August 1955 (aged 79); London, England
- Occupations: Businessman; philanthropist
- Known for: Founder of the McKenzies retail store chain

Sir John Robert Hugh McKenzie KBE (5 August 1876 – 26 August 1955) was a New Zealand businessman and philanthropist who founded the McKenzies chain of retail stores.

McKenzie was born in Yarrawalla, Victoria, Australia, on 5 August 1876.

In the 1950 New Year Honours, he was appointed a Knight Commander of the Order of the British Empire for public and philanthropic services. In 1953, he was awarded the Queen Elizabeth II Coronation Medal.

In 1996, McKenzie was posthumously inducted into the New Zealand Business Hall of Fame.
