= New Zealand at the 1934 British Empire Games =

- CGF code: NZL
- CGA: New Zealand Olympic and British Empire Games Association
- Website: www.olympic.org.nz

in London, England
- Competitors: 12
- Flag bearers: Opening: Jack Lovelock; Closing:
- Officials: 1
- Medals Ranked 6th: Gold 1 Silver 0 Bronze 2 Total 3

British Empire Games appearances
- 1930; 1934; 1938; 1950; 1954; 1958; 1962; 1966; 1970; 1974; 1978; 1982; 1986; 1990; 1994; 1998; 2002; 2006; 2010; 2014; 2018; 2022; 2026; 2030

New Zealand at the 1934 British Empire Games was represented by a small team of 12 competitors and one official. Team selection for the Games in London, England, was the responsibility of the New Zealand Olympic and British Empire Games Association. New Zealand's flagbearer at the opening ceremony was Jack Lovelock.

New Zealand has competed in every games, starting with the previous (and first) British Empire Games in 1930 at Hamilton, Ontario.

== Medal tables ==
Medal	Name	Sport	Event
Gold	Jack Lovelock	Athletics	Men's 1 mile
Bronze	Harold Brainsby	Athletics	Men's triple jump
Bronze	Noel Crump	Swimming	Men's 100 yards freestyle

Medals by sport
Sport	Gold medal	Silver medal	Bronze medal	Total
Athletics	1	0	1	2
Swimming	0	0	1	1
Total	1	0	2	3

Medals by gender
Gender	Gold medal	Silver medal	Bronze medal	Total
Male	1	0	2	3
Female	0	0	0	0
Total	1	0	2	3

== Competitors ==
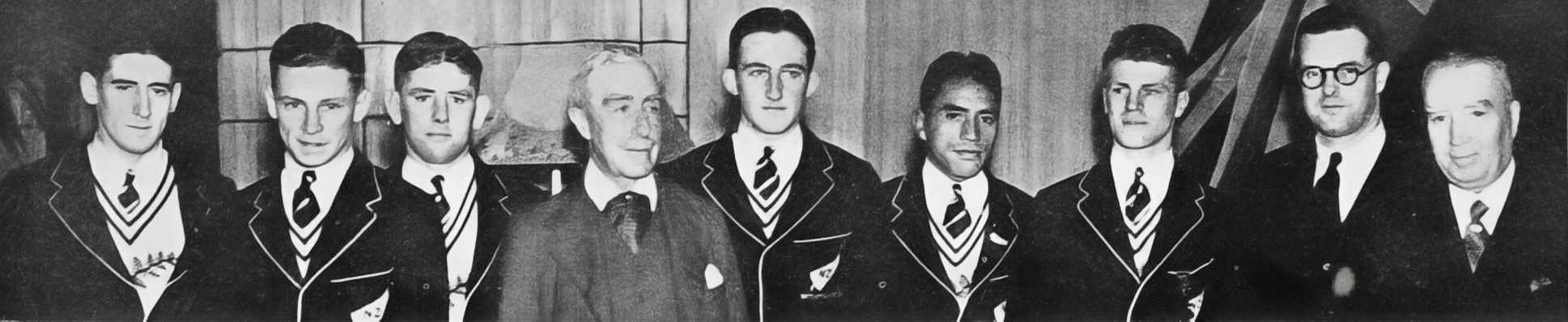
Members of the New Zealand team at a farewell function before departing for the 1934 British Empire Games. Left to right: Geoff Broadway, Harold Brainsby, Len Smith, Lord Bledisloe (governor-general), Noel Crump, Wiremu Whareaitu, Frank Grose, H. McCormick (president), and A. T. Davies (vice-president of the New Zealand Olympic and British Empire Games Association).

The following table lists the number of New Zealand competitors participating at the Games per sport/discipline.

Sport	Men	Women	Total
Athletics	3	0	3
Cycling	1	—N/a	1
Lawn bowls	5	—N/a	5
Swimming	3	0	3
Total	12	0	12

== Athletics ==
=== Track ===
Athlete	Event	Heat		Final	
Athlete	Event	Result	Rank (Note: Ranks given are within the heat)	Result	Rank
Geoff Broadway	Men's 440 yards		4	did not advance	
Geoff Broadway	Men's 880 yards		4	did not advance	
Jack Lovelock	Men's 1 mile		3 Q	4:12.8	1st place, gold medalist(s)
Jack Lovelock	Men's 3 miles	—N/a		did not start	

=== Field ===
Athlete	Event	Final	
Athlete	Event	Result	Rank
Harold Brainsby	Men's long jump	21 ft 6 1/2 in (6.57 m)	7
Harold Brainsby	Men's triple jump	47 ft 11 1/2 in (14.62 m)	3rd place, bronze medalist(s)

== Cycling ==
Athlete	Event	Time	Rank
Frank Grose	Men's 1 km time trial	1:20.4	4
Frank Grose	Men's 10 miles scratch race		4

Athlete	Event	Heats	Semifinals	Final / BM	
Athlete	Event	Opposition Time	Opposition Time	Opposition Time	Rank
Frank Grose	Men's 1000 yards sprint	McKenzie (SRH); W 1:48.6	Pethybridge (AUS); L 2:08	Clayton (SAF); L 2:41	4

== Lawn bowls ==
Athlete	Event	Round robin									Rank
Athlete	Event	Opposition Score	Opposition Score	Opposition Score	Opposition Score	Opposition Score	Opposition Score	Opposition Score	Opposition Score	Opposition Score	Rank
Len Keys	Men's singles	Baker (SRH); L 8–21	Hyde-Lay (HKG); L 9–21	Macdonald (CAN); L 1–21	Rusk (NIR); L 4–21	Walker (AUS); L 6–21	Holloway (WAL); L 11–21	McKinley (ENG); L 8–21	Sprot (SCO); L 15–21	Abbott (SAF); L 13–21	10
Harold Grocott; Billy Dillicar; George Pollard; George Carter (skip)	Men's fours	Hong Kong; W 18–16	Canada; L 14–19	Australia; W 24–12	Wales; W 31–17	England; L 16–28	Scotland; L 13–29	Northern Ireland; L	South Africa; L 15–30	Southern Rhodesia; W 20–16	5

== Swimming ==
Athlete	Event	Heat		Final	
Athlete	Event	Result	Rank (Note: Ranks given are within the heat)	Result	Rank
Noel Crump	Men's 100 yards freestyle	56.4	2 Q	56.2	3rd place, bronze medalist(s)
Len Smith	Men's 200 yards breaststroke	2:48.2	3	did not advance	
Wiremu Whareaitu	Men's 100 yards freestyle	did not start		—N/a	
Wiremu Whareaitu	Men's 100 yards backstroke		4	did not advance	
Noel Crump; Len Smith; Wiremu Whareaitu	Men's 3 x 100 yards medley relay	3:20.8	1 Q		5

== Officials ==
- Team manager – Arthur Porritt

== See also ==
- New Zealand Olympic Committee
- New Zealand at the Commonwealth Games
- New Zealand at the 1932 Summer Olympics
- New Zealand at the 1936 Summer Olympics
