= Cycling at the 1934 British Empire Games =

- Venue: Fallowfield Stadium, Manchester
- Dates: 11 August 1934

Cycling at the 1934 British Empire Games was the first appearance of Cycling at the Commonwealth Games. The events took place at the Fallowfield Stadium in Manchester despite the Games being hosted by London.

The events were held on the last day of the Games on 11 August 1934.

== Medal table ==
* Host nation (England)

Rank	Nation	Gold	Silver	Bronze	Total
1	Australia	1	1	0	2
1	Canada	1	1	0	2
3	England*	1	0	1	2
4	South Africa	0	1	2	3
Totals (4 entries)		3	3	3	9

== Medal winners ==
Event	Gold	Silver	Bronze
Time Trial	Dunc Gray (AUS)	Bob McLeod (CAN)	(South Africa) Ted Clayton (SAF)
Sprint 1000 yd	Ernest Higgins (ENG)	Horace Pethybridge (AUS)	(South Africa) Ted Clayton (SAF)
10 mile Scratch	Bob McLeod (CAN)	(South Africa) Ted Clayton (SAF)	William Harvell (ENG)

== 1,000m Time Trial ==
Pos	Athlete	Time
1	(Australia) Dunc Gray	1 min 16 2-5 sec
2	(Canada) Bob McLeod	1 min 18 sec
3	(South Africa) Ted Clayton	1 min 18 3-5 sec
4	(New Zealand) Frank Grose	1 min 20 2-5 sec
5	(England) William Harvell	1 min 21 3-5 sec
=6	(Northern Ireland) Denis Corr	1 min 22 1-5 sec
=6	(Southern Rhodesia) D McKenzie	1 min 22 1-5 sec
8	(Scotland) Willie Tagg	1 min 23 sec
9	(Wales) Frank Jones	1 min 16 2-5 sec

== 10 mile scratch race ==
Pos	Athlete	Time
1	(Canada) Bob McLeod	24 min 26 1-5 sec
2	(South Africa) Ted Clayton	half a wheel
3	(England) William Harvell	
4	(New Zealand) Frank Grose	
5	(England) John Sibbit	
6	(Canada) G Turner	
dnf	(Northern Ireland) Denis Corr	ret 2 miles
dnf	(Australia) Horace Pethybridge	puncture
dnf	(Australia) Dunc Gray	puncture
dnf	(Scotland) Willie Tagg	puncture
dnf	(Wales) Frank Jones	fell
dnf	(Southern Rhodesia) D McKenzie	fell

== 1,000 yards sprint championship ==
Heat 1

Pos	Athlete
1	(Australia) Horace Pethybridge
2	(Canada) G Turner
3	(Scotland) Willie Tagg

Heat 2

Pos	Athlete
1	(England) Ernest Higgins
2	(Southern Rhodesia) D. McKenzie
3	(Wales) Ernest Brown

Heat 3

Pos	Athlete
1	(South Africa) Ted Clayton
2	(New Zealand) Frank Grose
3	(Northern Ireland) Denis Corr

Semi final 1

Pos	Athlete
1	(England) Ernest Higgins
2	(South Africa) Ted Clayton

Semi final 2

Pos	Athlete
1	(Australia) Horace Pethybridge
2	(New Zealand) Frank Grose

Third place

Pos	Athlete
1	(South Africa) Ted Clayton
2	(New Zealand) Frank Grose

Final

Pos	Athlete	Time
1	(England) Ernest Higgins	1 min 58 4-5 sec
2	(Australia) Horace Pethybridge	2 lengths

== See also ==
- List of Commonwealth Games medallists in cycling
- Cycling at the Commonwealth Games
