= Athletics at the 1938 British Empire Games – Men's long jump =

Men's long jump at the Commonwealth Games

The men's long jump event at the 1938 British Empire Games was held on 10 February at the Sydney Cricket Ground in Sydney, Australia.

== Results ==
Rank	Name	Nationality	Result	Notes
1st place, gold medalist(s)	Harold Brown	Canada	24 ft 4 3/4 in (7.44 m)	GR
2nd place, silver medalist(s)	Jim Panton	Canada	23 ft 9 1/2 in (7.25 m)	
3rd place, bronze medalist(s)	Basil Dickinson	Australia	23 ft 5 5/8 in (7.15 m)	
4	Harry Gould	Australia	23 ft 4 1/2 in (7.12 m)	
5	Jack Metcalfe	Australia	23 ft 2 3/4 in (7.08 m)	
6	Walter Tambimuttu	British Ceylon	22 ft 9 3/4 in (6.95 m)	
7	Ray Graf	Australia	22 ft 6 in (6.86 m)	
8	Harry Lister	England	22 ft 5 1/2 in (6.85 m)	
9	Wallace Brown	Canada	21 ft 9 in (6.63 m)	
10	Sandy Duncan	England	21 ft 8 1/2 in (6.62 m)	
	Albert Shillington	Northern Ireland	DNS	
	Tracket Ashmead	Trinidad and Tobago	DNS	
