= Ted Clayton =

Ted Clayton may refer to:

- Ted Clayton (One Life to Live), a character on soap opera One Life to Live
- Ted Clayton (cyclist) (1911–1994), South African cyclist
