= George Watson (bowls) =

Irish lawn bowls player

Personal information
- Nationality: Northern Irish

Sport
- Sport: Lawn bowls
- Club: Shatfesbury BC
Medal record
Men's Lawn bowls
Representing Northern Ireland
Commonwealth Games
Silver medal – second place	1934 London	rinks (fours)

George Watson was a Lawn bowls international from Northern Ireland who competed at the British Empire Games (now the Commonwealth Games).

== Biography ==
Watson represented the 1934 Northern Irish Team at the 1934 British Empire Games in London, participating in the rinks (fours) event with Cecil Curran, Charlie Clawson and Percy Watson and won the silver medal.

Watson captained Ireland but later moved to England and was playing bowls for Middlesex Bowling Club in 1957.
