= Athletics at the 1938 British Empire Games – Men's triple jump =

Men's triple jump at the Commonwealth Games

The men's triple jump event at the 1938 British Empire Games was held on 12 February at the Sydney Cricket Ground in Sydney, Australia.

== Results ==
Rank	Name	Nationality	Result	Notes
1st place, gold medalist(s)	Jack Metcalfe	Australia	50 ft 10 in (15.49 m)	
2nd place, silver medalist(s)	Lloyd Miller	Australia	50 ft 6 3/4 in (15.41 m)	
3rd place, bronze medalist(s)	Basil Dickinson	Australia	50 ft 1 3/4 in (15.28 m)	
4	Ray Graf	Australia	47 ft 11 1/2 in (14.62 m)	
5	Harold Brown	Canada	46 ft 2 1/4 in (14.08 m)	
6	Bert Shillington	Northern Ireland	45 ft 8 3/4 in (13.94 m)	
7	Jim Panton	Canada	43 ft 10 1/2 in (13.37 m)	
8	Wallace Brown	Canada	40 ft 1 1/2 in (12.23 m)	
	Walter Tambimuttu	British Ceylon	DNS	
