= William Kent (bowls) =

Welsh lawn bowler

Personal information
- Nationality: British (Welsh)

Sport
- Sport: Lawn bowls
- Club: Wattstown BC
Medal record
Men's Lawn bowls
Representing Wales
National Championships
Gold medal – first place	1934	fours

William G. Kent was a Welsh lawn bowls international who competed at the British Empire Games (now Commonwealth Games).

== Biography ==
Kent was a member of the Wattstown Bowling Club in Wattstown in the Rhondda Valley. In 1933, he was runner-up in the Ernest Orr Cup.

He was part of the Wattstown quartet that won the 1934 Welsh national title in the rinks. By virtue of winning the 1934 national rinks, he was selected for the 1934 British Empire Games in London the following month.

He subsequently represented the 1934 Welsh Empire team in the fours/rinks event, with Michael Manweiler, Isaac Rees and R Williams.

In 1935 he took part in the international trial matches.
