= John Downing (bowls) =

Irish lawn bowls player

Personal information
- Nationality: Northern Irish
- Born: 1904 Belfast, Northern Ireland
- Died: September 1987 (aged 82–83) Belfast, Northern Ireland

Sport
- Sport: Lawn bowls
- Club: Shatfesbury BC; Ormeau United BC

John Downing (c.1904 – September 1987) was a Lawn bowls international from Northern Ireland who competed at the British Empire Games (now the Commonwealth Games).

== Biography ==
Downing was a member of the Shatfesbury Bowls Club in Belfast and bowled for the Northern Ireland Bowls Association at representative level.

In 1930 he was voted in as the president of Shaftesbury BC, in addition to holding the same role with the Ormeau United Bowling Club.

Downing represented the 1934 Northern Irish Team at the 1934 British Empire Games in London, participating in the pairs event with Robert Taylor, finishing in sixth place.

In 1935, he was the runner-up in the singles championship at the Irish National Bowls Championships.

In 1955 Downing's Shaftesbury joined the Private Greens' Bowling League. He opened the green in memory of his father and mother, Edward and Elizabeth Downing. John was a qualified dental surgeon and celebrated 50 years with Shaftesbury BC in November 1973, alongside fellow club member Charles Clawson.

He died in September 1987.
