= Athletics at the 1938 British Empire Games – Men's high jump =

Men's high jump at the Commonwealth Games

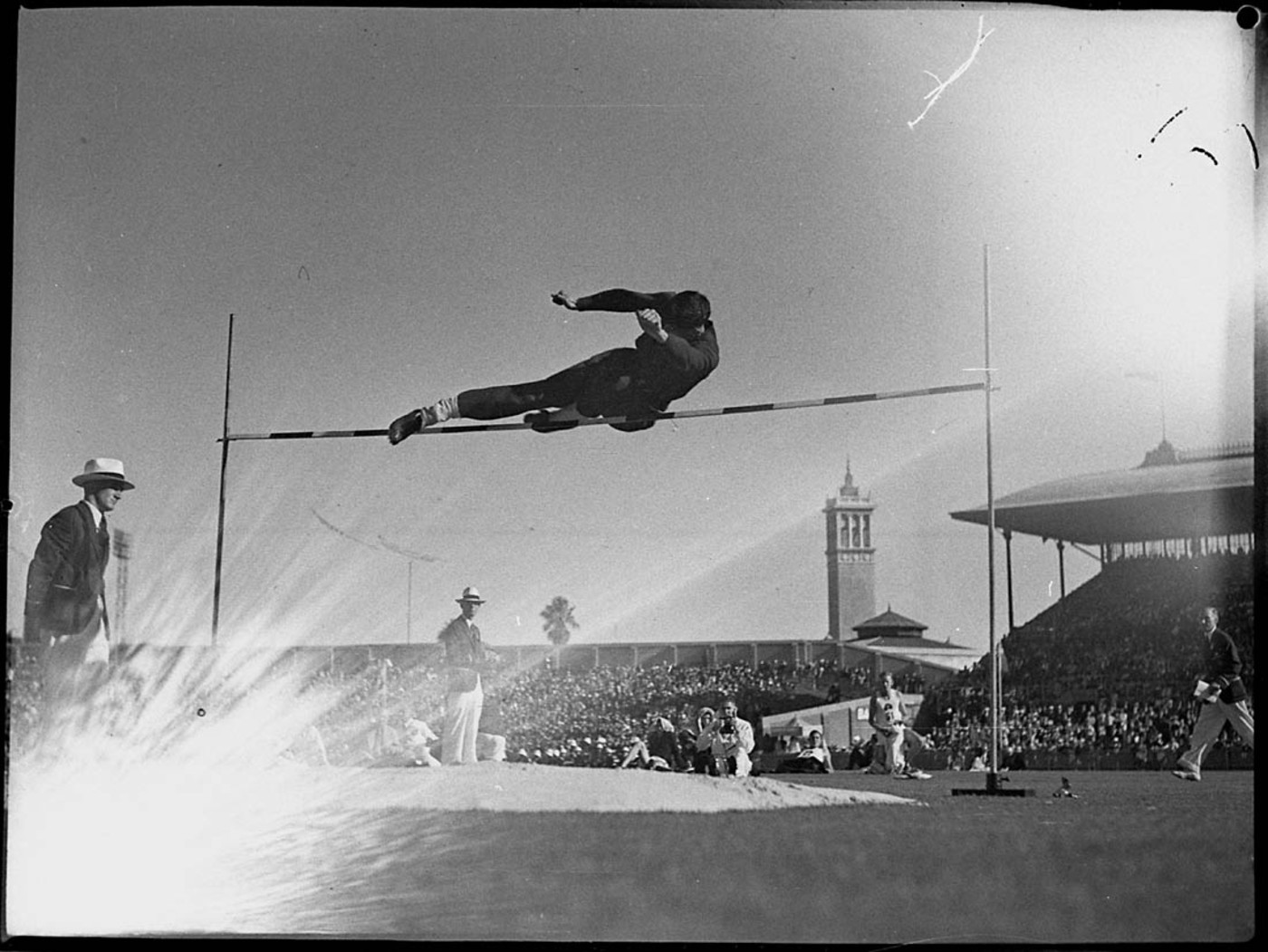
The high jump event at the Sydney Cricket Ground

The men's high jump event at the 1938 British Empire Games was held on 5 February at the Sydney Cricket Ground in Sydney, Australia.

The winning margin was (in metric terms) 8 cm which as of 2024 remains the only time the men's high jump was won by more than 5 cm at these games.

== Results ==
Rank	Name	Nationality	Result	Notes
1st place, gold medalist(s)	Edwin Thacker	South Africa	6 ft 5 1/8 in (1.96 m)	GR
2nd place, silver medalist(s)	Robert Heffernan	Australia	6 ft 2 in (1.88 m)	
3rd place, bronze medalist(s)	Doug Shetliffe	Australia	6 ft 2 in (1.88 m)	
4	Peter Tancred	Australia	6 ft 1 1/4 in (1.86 m)	
5	John Lunn Newman	England	6 ft 1 1/4 in (1.86 m)	
6	Joseph Haley	Canada	6 ft 1 1/4 in (1.86 m)	
7	Jack Metcalfe	Australia	5 ft 11 3/4 in (1.82 m)	
8	Henry Perera	British Ceylon	5 ft 11 3/4 in (1.82 m)	
9	Pat Haley	Canada	5 ft 10 in (1.78 m)	
10	Jim Panton	Canada	5 ft 10 in (1.78 m)	
11	Tracket Ashmead	Trinidad and Tobago	5 ft 8 in (1.73 m)	
