= Len Smith (swimmer) =

New Zealand swimmer (1906–1998)

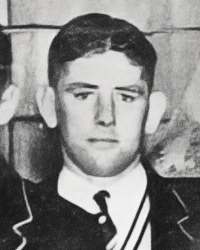
- Smith in 1934

Personal information
- Born: Leonard Smith; 29 July 1906 Whanganui, New Zealand
- Died: 14 March 1998 (aged 91) New Zealand
- Occupation: Farmer

Sport
- Country: New Zealand
- Sport: Swimming
- Club: Feilding Amateur Swimming Club

Achievements and titles
- National finals: 100 yd breaststroke, 1st (1939); 220 yd breaststroke, 1st (1929, 1930, 1931, 1932, 1933, 1934, 1935, 1936)
- Personal best(s): 100 yd breaststroke: 1:15.6; 220 yd breaststroke: 3:01.4

Leonard Smith (29 July 1906 – 14 March 1998) was a New Zealand swimmer who represented his country at the 1934 British Empire Games in London.

Born in Whanganui in 1906, Smith was a farmer and a member of the Feilding Amateur Swimming Club. He won nine New Zealand national breaststroke titles: the 100 yards in 1939; and the 220 yards every year from 1929 to 1936. His best winning time for the 220 yards breaststroke was 3:01.4, which he swam in breaking his own New Zealand record at the 1935 national championships at the Tepid Baths in Auckland. He also held the national 100 yards breaststroke record, with a time of 1:15.6 clocked when he won the New Zealand title for that distance in 1939.

At the 1934 British Empire Games, Smith competed in the men's 200 yards breaststroke. He finished third in his heat and did not progress. However, he reached the final of the 3 x 100 yards medley relay with teammates Noel Crump and Wiremu Whareaitu, finishing fifth.

Smith retired from competitive swimming after the 1939 season.
