= Charles Tait =

Charles Tait may refer to:

- Charles Tait (politician)
- Charles Tait (film director)
- Charles Tait (bowls)
