= Michael Manweiler =

Welsh lawn bowler

Personal information
- Nationality: British (Welsh)
- Born: 29 September 1885 Wicklow, Ireland
- Died: 13 July 1968 (aged 82) Glamorgan, Wales

Sport
- Sport: Lawn bowls
- Club: Wattstown BC
Medal record
Men's Lawn bowls
Representing Wales
National Championships
Gold medal – first place	1934	fours

Michael Manweiler (29 September 1885 – 13 July 1968) was a Welsh lawn bowls international who competed at the British Empire Games (now Commonwealth Games).

== Biography ==
Born in Ireland, Manweiler moved to Wales just after the turn of the 20th century and was a member of the Wattstown Bowling Club in Wattstown in the Rhondda Valley.

He was part of the Wattstown quartet that won the 1934 Welsh national title in the rinks. By virtue of winning the 1934 national rinks, he was selected for the 1934 British Empire Games in London the following month.

He subsequently represented the 1934 Welsh Empire team in the fours/rinks event, with Isaac Rees, William Kent and R Williams.

In 1938 he was playing his bowls in Ystalyfera and living in Pontardawe Road near Swansea and was police constable by profession.
