= William Tagg =

William Tagg may refer to:

- William Tagg (wrestler)
- William Tagg (cyclist)
