= Cecil Curran =

Irish Lawn bowls player

Personal information
- Nationality: Northern Irish

Sport
- Sport: Lawn bowls
- Club: Ormeau BC; Shaftesbury BC
Medal record
Men's Lawn bowls
Representing Northern Ireland
Commonwealth Games
| Silver medal – second place | 1934 London | rinks (fours) |

Cecil Curran was a Lawn bowls international from Northern Ireland who competed at the British Empire Games (now the Commonwealth Games).

== Biography ==
Curran started bowling in 1927 for the Ormeau club. He represented the 1934 Northern Irish Team at the 1934 British Empire Games in London, participating in the rinks (fours) event with Charlie Clawson, George Watson and Percy Watson and won the silver medal.

He bowled for the Shaftesbury Bowls Club in Belfast and was twice National pairs champion with Charlie Clawson in 1932 and 1939.

Curran played 50 times for Ireland.
