= Harold Grocott =

New Zealand lawn bowls player

Personal information
- Born: 9 March 1876 St Pancras, London, England
- Died: 11 February 1960 (aged 83) Auckland, New Zealand
- Occupation(s): Pharmacist, optometrist
- Spouse: Elizabeth Bazley (m. 1901; died 1946)
- Relative: Horace Grocott (brother)

Sport
- Country: New Zealand
- Sport: Lawn bowls
- Club: Carlton Bowling Club, Auckland

Harold Grocott (9 March 1876 – 11 February 1960) was a New Zealand lawn bowls player who competed for his country at the 1934 British Empire Games.

== Early life and family ==
Born in England, in the London district of St Pancras, on 9 March 1876, Grocott was the son of Joseph Henry Grocott and Hannah Dryden. He was baptised at Holy Trinity Church, Marylebone on 4 June 1876. In 1877, the family emigrated to New Zealand, where Joseph and Hannah were married the same year. Harold's younger brother, Horace, was born in Napier in 1880, and soon after, they moved to Dunedin.

On 4 March 1901, Harold Grocott married Elizabeth Bazley at First Church, Dunedin. The couple went on to have one son—Eric Harold Grocott, who was appointed a Companion of the Queen's Service Order for community service in the 1979 New Year Honours—and one daughter.

== Professional career ==
By 1902, Grocott was in charge of Wilkinson and Sons' branch chemist shop in George Street, Dunedin, and was living above the shop. Two years later, he had his own chemist's shop in Roxburgh, building a large new house and shop in Scotland Street, and he took on Sydney Smith, who would go on to become a renowned forensic scientist and pathologist, as an apprentice. Grocott sold the business in 1907.

After a short period in Eltham where he owned a pharmacy, Grocott later moved to Hamilton, purchasing Arthur Edwards Manning's pharmacy business and optometry practice in 1911. Manning went on to serve as mayor of Hamilton from 1912 to 1915.

In 1920, Grocott travelled to London, where he passed the examinations set by the Worshipful Company of Spectacle Makers, gaining him Fellowship in Optometry of the Worshipful Company of Spectacle Makers (FSMC). He was also admitted to the Freedom of the City of London by redemption, in the Company of Spectacle Makers, and was appointed as a Fellow of the British Institute of Opticians. Grocott retired to Auckland in the early 1930s.

== Lawn bowls ==
A member of the Carlton Bowling Club in Auckland, Grocott was selected to represent New Zealand in the men's fours at the 1934 British Empire Games in London, alongside two other bowlers from Carlton, namely George Pollard, and George Carter (skip), and Billy Dillicar from Hamilton's Whitiora Bowling Club. At the Games, they won four of their nine round-robin matches to finish in fifth place.

== Other activities ==
Grocott was an active Rotarian in Hamilton. He attended the Rotary International Convention in Denver, Colorado, in 1926, where he was appointed as a member of the elections committee for the convention.

== Death ==
Grocott died in Auckland on 11 February 1960, and he was buried at Purewa Cemetery. He had been predeceased by his wife, Elizabeth, in 1946.
