= Charlie Clawson =

Irish lawn bowls player

Personal information
- Nationality: Northern Irish
- Born: 10 March 1901 Belfast, Northern Ireland
- Died: February 1975 (aged 73) Belfast, Northern Ireland

Sport
- Sport: Lawn bowls
- Club: Shaftesbury BC
Medal record
Men's Lawn bowls
Representing Northern Ireland
Commonwealth Games
| Silver medal – second place | 1934 London | rinks (fours) |

Charles Clawson (10 March 1901 – February 1975) was a Lawn bowls international from Northern Ireland who competed at the British Empire Games (now the Commonwealth Games).

== Biography ==
Clawson represented the 1934 Northern Irish Team at the 1934 British Empire Games in London, participating in the rinks (fours) event with Cecil Curran, George Watson and Percy Watson and won the silver medal.

He bowled for the Shaftesbury Bowls Club in Belfast and was honorary secretary of the club. He was the Honorary Treasurer of the Irish Bowling Association from 1933-1954. The pairs cup at the Irish National Bowls Championships is named after him.

He was twice National pairs champion with Cecil Curran in 1932 and 1939.

Clawson continued his administration duties within bowls and in 1968 was the Chairman of the British Isles Council.

He died in February 1975 at his home in Deramore Avenue in Belfast.
