= William McDonald (bowls) =

Canadian international lawn bowls player

William Spencer McDonald
Personal information
- Nickname: Spence
- Nationality: Canada
- Born: 1885
- Died: April 20, 1938 (aged 52–53)
- Occupation: Druggist

Sport
- Sport: Lawn bowls
Medal record
Men's Lawn bowls
Representing (Canada)
British Empire Games
Silver medal – second place	1934 London	Singles

William S McDonald (1885-April 20,1938), was a Canadian international lawn bowls player who competed in the 1934 British Empire Games.

== Bowls career ==
At the 1934 British Empire Games he won the silver medal in the singles event.

== Personal life ==
He was a druggist by trade and travelled to the 1934 Games with his wife Margaret. Together, they had four children: William Frost McDonald (1914-1957), Mary Margaret (1916-1916), and stillborn twin boys in 1920. Spencer’s only granddaughter still has his medal from 1934.
