= George Pollard (bowls) =

Personal information
- Born: George Gladstone Pollard; 30 December 1874 Auckland, New Zealand
- Died: 10 September 1963 (aged 88) Auckland, New Zealand
- Occupation: Builder
- Spouse: Helen Oliver Knox (m. 1898; died 1950)

Sport
- Country: New Zealand
- Sport: Lawn bowls
- Club: Carlton Bowling Club

George Gladstone Pollard (30 December 1874 – 10 September 1963) was a New Zealand lawn bowls player who competed for his country at the 1934 British Empire Games.

== Early life and family ==
Born in Auckland on 30 December 1874, Pollard was the son of Sarah and Alfred Pollard. On 26 January 1898, he married Helen Oliver Knox at the Wesleyan church in Grafton Road, Auckland.

== Builder ==
Pollard was a builder, and served on the committee of the Auckland Master Builders' Association. He was responsible for the construction in 1923–24 of the (former) W.A. Thompson and Company building, designed by architects Holman, Moses and Watkin, at 307–319 Queen Street, Auckland, that was given historic place category 2 status by the New Zealand Historic Places Trust in 1987.

== Lawn bowls ==
A member of the Carlton Bowling Club in Auckland, Pollard was a member of the men's four—alongside Billy Dillicar, Harold Grocott and George Carter (skip)—that represented New Zealand at the 1934 British Empire Games in London. They won four of their nine round-robin matches, finishing in fifth place.

Pollard was elected president of the Carlton Bowling Club in 1933.

== Death ==
Carter died in Auckland on 10 September 1963, and he was buried at Purewa Cemetery. He had been predeceased by his wife, Nellie, in 1950.
