= Flora Forde =

New Zealand political activist, feminist and welfare worker

Flora McMillan Forde OBE (9 June 1883 – 13 December 1958) was a New Zealand political activist, feminist and welfare worker.

== Early life ==
Forde was born on her parents' farm in Wyndham, Southland, New Zealand on 9 June 1883. Her parents were Catherine Stalker and Henry Ive. Her father later became a baker and master butcher. She attended school in Wyndham and Invercargill. She married a railway clerk, Michael Joseph Forde, on 5 November 1902 and they had two daughters and a son. Michael left his job in July 1903 to become a journalist and eventually became the chief reporter for the Southland Times.

== Later life and activism ==
She began to volunteer in women and labour movements in 1910 by joining the Sixpenny Clothing Club, the Invercargill Housewives’ Union and the Southland Trades and Labour Council. She also helped set up the Southland branch of the Worker's Educational Association in 1915.

Forde and her husband moved to Wellington in 1917 where Michael began working in the railway industry again until he retired in 1954. Forde continued to volunteer in women and labour movements and joined the Wellington branch of the Worker's Educational Association as well as the Wellington Housewives’ Union. She joined the New Zealand Society for the Protection of Women and Children in the 1930s where she served as treasurer for 17 years and later President of the Wellington branch and served as the executive of the Southland War Funds Association during World War II. She was also a long-term member of the National Council of Women of New Zealand (NCW). She served as a domain secretary between 1924 and 1925 and again between 1934 and 1937 before being elected president in 1948. She also represented the NCW at the council of the New Zealand Standards Institute from 1947 until 1958.

In 1935, she was awarded the King George V Silver Jubilee Medal, and in 1953, she was awarded the Queen Elizabeth II Coronation Medal. She was appointed an Officer of the Order of the British Empire in the 1952 Queen's Birthday Honours.

Forde died on 13 September 1958 in Wellington and was survived by her husband and two daughters.
