= James Brown (bowls) =

Scottish lawn bowls player

Personal information
- Nationality: British (Scottish)

Sport
- Sport: Lawn bowls
- Club: Kirkhill BC, Cambuslang
Medal record
Men's Lawn bowls
Representing Scotland
Commonwealth Games
Bronze medal – third place	1934 London	rinks (fours)

James Brown was a Scottish lawn bowls international who competed in the 1934 British Empire Games.

== Bowls career ==
Brown was a member of the Kirkhill Bowls Club of Cambuslang.

At the 1934 British Empire Games he won the bronze medal in the rinks (fours) event with William Lowe, Charles Tait and James Morrison.
