= Geoff Broadway =

New Zealand middle-distance runner

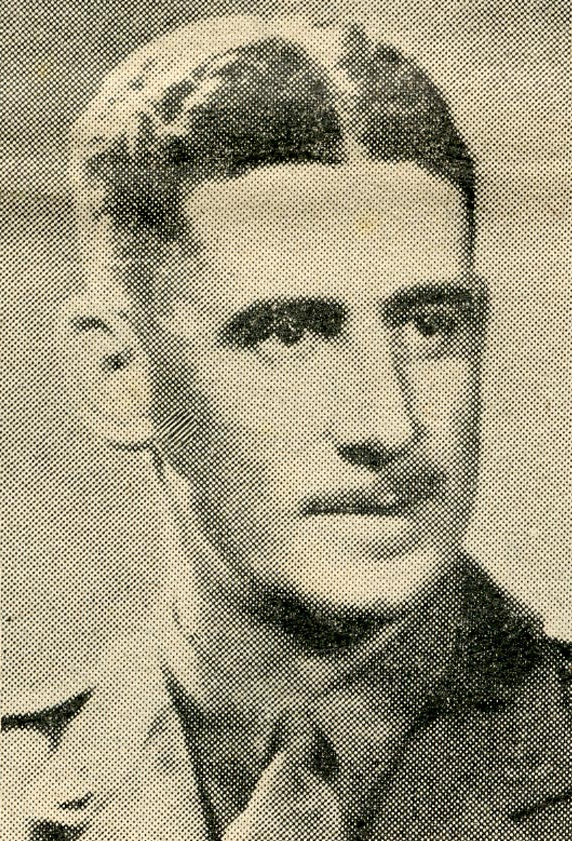

Personal information
- Full name: Thomas Geoffrey Broadway
- Born: 19 June 1911 Christchurch, New Zealand
- Died: 24 November 1978 (aged 67) New Zealand
- Spouse: Daphne Ellen Vercoe

Sport
- Country: New Zealand
- Sport: Athletics

Achievements and titles
- National finals: 440 yards champion (1934); 880 yards champion (1932, 1933, 1934)

Thomas Geoffrey Broadway (19 June 1911 – 24 November 1978) was a New Zealand middle-distance runner who represented his country at the 1934 British Empire Games in London.

== Early life and family ==
Born in Christchurch on 19 June 1911, Broadway was the son of Edward Broadway and Elizabeth Broadway (née Honnor). He married Daphne Ellen Vercoe after his return from World War II.

== Athletics ==
Broadway won four national athletics titles: the 440 yards in 1934; and the 880 yards in 1932, 1933 and 1934.

At the 1934 British Empire Games in London, Broadway competed in the 440 yards and 880 yards, finishing fourth in the heats for both events and not progressing further. In January 1935, he represented New Zealand at the Centenary Games in Melbourne, winning the invitational 880 yards, and finishing third in the invitational 440 yards.

== Later life and death ==
Broadway served with the 2nd New Zealand Expeditionary Force during World War II, having been a commercial traveller before enlistment. He embarked as a sergeant with the first echelon in 1940, and was commissioned as a second lieutenant in January 1942. Later promoted to lieutenant, he returned to New Zealand on furlough in July 1943. After returning to active service, he was reported wounded in June 1944.

Broadway died on 24 November 1978, and his ashes were buried at Woodlawn Memorial Gardens in the Christchurch suburb of Linwood.
