= Alfred Langford =

Canadian lawn bowls player

Personal information
- Born: August 16, 1873 Hamilton, Ontario, Canada
- Died: March 23, 1970 (aged 96) Middlesex County, Ontario, Canada
- Occupation: Merchant

Sport
- Sport: Lawn bowls
Medal record
Men's Lawn bowls
Representing (Canada)
British Empire Games
Silver medal – second place	1934 London	Pairs

Alfred Alexander Langford (16 August 1873 – 23 March 1970), was a Canadian international lawn bowls player who competed in the 1934 British Empire Games.

== Bowls career ==
Langford was active in helping set up the Canadian Lawn Bowling Association in April 1932. He was the first Honorary Secretary and Treasurer of the Onatario Association and later became the Life President.

At the 1934 British Empire Games he won the silver medal in the pairs event with William Hutchinson.

== Personal life ==
He was a merchant by trade. He was resident at the Strand Hotel during the Games along with most of the other Canadian bowlers and travelled to the event with his wife Lezetta.
