= James McKinlay =

British bowls player

Personal information
- Nationality: British (English/Scottish)
- Born: 1875 Scotland
- Died: 28 January 1961 (aged 85–86) Scotland

Sport
- Sport: Lawn bowls
- Club: Paddington BC

James Meikle McKinlay (1875–28 January 1961), was a Scottish born England international lawn bowls player who competed in the 1934 British Empire Games.

== Bowls career ==
At the 1934 British Empire Games he finished in fourth place in the pairs event.

He was the 1933 singles National Champion.

== Personal life ==
He moved to Middlesex, England before returning to Scotland many years later.
