= James Morrison (bowls) =

Scottish lawn bowler

Personal information
- Nationality: British (Scottish)

Sport
- Sport: Lawn bowls
- Club: Strathaven BC
Medal record
Men's Lawn bowls
Representing Scotland
Commonwealth Games
Bronze medal – third place	1934 London	rinks (fours)

James P. Morrison was a Scottish Lawn bowls international who competed in the 1934 British Empire Games.

== Bowls career ==
Morrison was a member of the Strathaven Bowls Club.

At the 1934 British Empire Games he won the bronze medal in the rinks (fours) event with William Lowe, Charles Tait and James Brown.

He was a Scottish international from 1927 to 1935.
