= Wiremu Whareaitu =

New Zealand swimmer

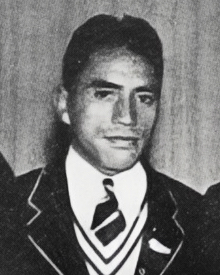
- Whareaitu in 1934

Personal information
- Born: 15 August 1912 New Zealand
- Died: 3 April 1973 (aged 60) New Zealand
- Spouse: Katarina Riripeti Riripotaka (m. 1935)

Sport
- Country: New Zealand
- Sport: Swimming

Achievements and titles
- National finals: 150 yds backstroke, 1st (1934)

Wiremu "Bill" Whareaitu (15 August 1912 − 3 April 1973) was a New Zealand swimmer, who represented his country at the 1934 British Empire Games in London.

Whareaitu was the national 150 yards backstroke champion in 1934, and travelled to the Empire Games in London that year as part of the three-strong New Zealand swimming team. At those games he finished fourth in his heat of the 100 yards backstroke and did not progress. He reached the final of the 3 x 110 yards medley relay with teammates Noel Crump and Len Smith, finishing fifth.

Of Te Arawa and Tūhourangi descent, Whareaitu served with the 28th (Māori) Battalion during World War II, and competed in the battalion's team at the New Zealand Division swimming championships at Maadi, Egypt in September 1943. In May 1945 he was commissioned as a second lieutenant.

Whareaitu died in 1973 and was buried at Kauae Cemetery, Ngongotahā.
