= Jack Parker (runner) =

Northern Irish athlete

Personal information
- Nationality: British (Northern Irish)

Sport
- Sport: Athletics
- Event: middle-distance / cross-country
- Club: Brighton and County Harriers; Belgrave Harriers; County Antrim Harriers

John Parker, known as Jack Parker, was a Northern Irish athlete, who competed at the 1934 British Empire Games.

== Biography ==
Parker was a member of the Brighton and County Harriers and despite being based in England was deemed eligible to represent Northern Ireland.

He represented Northern Ireland at the 1934 British Empire Games, in the 3 miles event finishing in fifth place.

Parker also competed in cross-country. At the 1937 AAA Championships, he finished third behind Peter Ward and János Kelen in the British AAA Championships 3 miles event. Parker later joined Belgrave Harriers and occasionally ran for County Antrim Harriers.
