= Lawn bowls at the 1934 British Empire Games =

Commonwealth Games lawn bowls event

- Venue: Temple Bowls Club & Paddington Bowls Club
- Location: London, England
- Dates: 4 August – 11 August 1934
- Competitors: 68 from 10 nations

Lawn bowls at the 1934 British Empire Games was the second appearance of the Lawn bowls at the Commonwealth Games.

Competition took place at the Temple Bowling Club in Denmark Hill and the Paddington Bowling Club in Maida Vale, London, England, from 4–11 August 1934.

England topped the medal table by winning two gold medals. Scotland won the singles event and England won both the pairs and rinks events.

== Medal table ==
* Host nation (England)

Rank	Nation	Gold	Silver	Bronze	Total
1	England*	2	0	0	2
2	Scotland	1	0	1	2
3	Canada	0	2	0	2
4	Northern Ireland	0	1	0	1
5	South Africa	0	0	1	1
5	Wales	0	0	1	1
Totals (6 entries)		3	3	3	9

== Medal summary ==
Event	Gold	Silver	Bronze
Singles	(Scotland) Robert Sprot	(Canada) William McDonald	(South Africa) Charles Abbott
Pairs	(England) Tommy Hills and George Wright	(Canada) William Hutchinson and Alfred Langford	(Wales) Thomas Davies and Stan Weaver
Rinks/Fours	(England) Robert Slater; Ernie Gudgeon; Percy Tomlinson; Fred Biggin	(Northern Ireland) Cecil Curran; Charlie Clawson; George Watson; Percy Watson	(Scotland) William Lowe; Charles Tait; James Morrison; James Brown

== Men's singles – round robin ==
=== Results ===
Round	Date	Tie 1	Tie 2	Tie 3	Tie 4	Tie 5
Round 1	Aug 6	Eng 13 Sco 21	Ire 13 Wal 21	Aus 21 SAf 20	Rho 21 Nzl 18	Can 21 Hkg 5
Round 2	Aug 6	Eng 21 Wal 14	Ire 17 Sco 21	Aus 19 Rho 21	SAf 21 Can 8	Hkg 21 Nzl 9
Round 3	Aug 7	Ire 19 Hkg 21	Rho 15 Wal 21	Nzl 1 Can 21	Eng 21 Aus 16	Sco 21 SAf 19
Round 4	Aug 7	Ire 21 Nzl 13	Wal 15 Can 21	Rho 21 Hkg 4	Eng 20 SAf 21	Sco 21 Aus 14
Round 5	Aug 8	Eng 21 Hkg 19	Sco 21 Rho 9	Ire 18 Can 21	Wal 14 SAf 21	Aus 21 Nzl 6
Round 6	Aug 8	Eng 21 Rho 17	Sco 21 Hkg 5	Ire 13 SAf 21	Wal 21 Nzl 11	Can 21 Aus 11
Round 7	Aug 9	Ire 21 Rho 19	Wal 21 Aus 17	SAf 21 Hkg 14	Eng 21 Nzl 8	Sco 21 Can 19
Round 8	Aug 9	Ire 6 Aus 21	Wal 21 Hkg 15	SAf 21 Rho 14	Eng 16 Can 21	Sco 21 Nzl 13
Round 9	Aug 10	Eng 15 Ire 21	Sco 21 Wal 18	Aus 21 Hkg 19	SAf 21 Nzl 13	Rho 10 Can 21

Pos	Player	P	W	L	Pts
1	(Scotland) Robert Sprot	9	9	0	18
2	(Canada) William McDonald	9	7	2	14
3	(South Africa) Charles Abbott	9	7	2	14
4	(England) James McKinlay	9	5	4	10
5	(Wales) Percy Holloway	9	5	4	10
6	(Australia) E. W. Walker	9	4	5	8
7	(Southern Rhodesia) George Baker	9	3	6	6
8	(Northern Ireland) Dr. John Rusk	9	3	6	6
9	(Hong Kong) Alexander Hyde-Lay	9	2	7	4
10	(New Zealand) Len Keys	9	0	9	0

== Men's pairs – round robin ==
=== Results ===
Round	Date	Tie 1	Tie 2	Tie 3	Tie 4
Round 1	Aug 6	Eng 28 Sco 14	Ire 17 Wal 21	Aus 18 SAf 26	Can 18 Hkg 15
Round 2	Aug 6	Eng 21 Wal 17	Ire 18 Sco 24	Aus 17 Rho 17	SAf 21 Can 16
Round 3	Aug 7	Ire 23 Hkg 14	Rho 15 Wal 32	Eng 18 Aus 17	Sco 26 SAf 14
Round 4	Aug 7	Wal 25 Can 16	Rho 16 Hkg 35	Eng 31 SAf 11	Sco 29 Aus 11
Round 5	Aug 8	Eng 30 Hkg 19	Sco 29 Rho 13	Ire 19 Can 20	Wal 20 SAf 21
Round 6	Aug 8	Eng 25 Rho 16	Hkg 23 Sco 16	Ire 24 SAf 15	Can 22 Aus 16
Round 7	Aug 9	Ire 15 Rho 16	Wal 22 Aus 10	SAf 11 Hkg 20	Sco 14 Can 25
Round 8	Aug 9	Ire 25 Aus 10	Wal 24 Hkg 25	SAf 18 Rho 27	Eng 16 Can 9
Round 9	Aug 10	Eng 25 Ire 21	Sco 19 Wal 27	Aus 14 Hkg 23	Rho 13 Can 22

Pos	Player	P	W	D	L	Pts
1	(England) Tommy Hills & George Wright	8	8	0	0	16
2	(Canada) William Hutchinson & Alfred Langford	8	6	0	2	12
3	(Wales) Thomas Davies & Stan Weaver	8	5	0	3	10
4	(Hong Kong) Frederick Rapley & H G Cooper	8	5	0	3	10
5	(Scotland) Alex Niven & George Niven	8	4	0	4	8
6	(Northern Ireland) Robert David Taylor & John Downing	8	3	0	5	6
7	(Southern Rhodesia) G Evans & G W Baxter	8	2	1	5	5
8	(South Africa) Andrew Harvey & Hugo Holshausen	8	2	0	6	4
9	(Australia) J Banks & Thomas Rainer	8	0	1	7	1

== Men's rinks (fours) – round robin ==
=== Results ===
Round	Date	Tie 1	Tie 2	Tie 3	Tie 4	Tie 5
Round 1	Aug 6	Eng 21 Sco 12	Ire 21 Wal 17	Aus 18 SAf 20	Rho 16 Nzl 21	Can 19 Hkg 10
Round 2	Aug 6	Eng 34 Wal 17	Ire 20 Sco 19	Hkg 16 Nzl 18	Rho 18 Aus 18	SAf 26 Can 16
Round 3	Aug 7	Ire 28 Hkg 10	Rho 27 Wal 11	Can 19 Nzl 14	Eng 28 Aus 6	Sco 17 SAf 16
Round 4	Aug 7	Ire 31 Nzl 10	Wal 19 Can 22	Rho 22 Hkg 18	Eng 15 SAf 22	Sco 40 Aus 10
Round 5	Aug 8	Eng 31 Hkg 15	Sco 23 Rho 14	Ire 23 Can 15	Wal 19 SAf 16	Aus 12 Nzl 24
Round 6	Aug 8	Eng 29 Rho 8	Sco 25 Hkg 16	Ire 24 SAf 21	Wal 17 Nzl 31	Can 14 Aus 18
Round 7	Aug 9	Ire 22 Rho 14	Wal 11 Aus 25	SAf 21 Hkg 19	Eng 28 Nzl 16	Sco 17 Can 17
Round 8	Aug 9	Ire 33 Aus 13	Wal 25 Hkg 17	SAf 37 Rho 8	Eng 19 Can 13	Sco 29 Nzl 13
Round 9	Aug 10	Eng 21 Ire 15	Sco 17 Wal 17	Aus 25 Hkg 27	SAf 30 Nzl 15	Rho 22 Can 16

Pos	Player	P	W	D	L	Pts
1	(England) Fred Biggin (skip), Robert Slater, Ernie Gudgeon, Percy Tomlinson	9	8	0	1	16
2	(Northern Ireland) Percy Watson (skip), Cecil Curran, Charlie Clawson, George Watson,	9	8	0	1	16
3	(Scotland) William Lowe (skip), Charles Tait, James Morrison, James Brown	9	5	2	2	12
4	(South Africa) James Thoms (skip), Hugo C Holshausen, Charles Abbott, J Morton	9	6	0	3	12
5	(New Zealand) George Carter (skip), Harold Grocott, George Pollard, Billy Dillicar	9	4	0	5	8
6	(Canada) William D Euler (skip), William G Cleghorn, Harvey J Sims, Norman H Snell	9	3	1	5	7
7	(Southern Rhodesia) A E W Stodart (skip), H S Taylor, J Houston, C E Harrison	9	3	1	5	7
8	(Wales) Isaac Rees (skip), R. Williams, William Kent, Michael Manweiler	9	2	1	6	5
9	(Australia) C.A.Gale (Skip), J.H.Langley, William White, Sir Henry Barwell	9	2	1	6	5
10	(Hong Kong) Hugh Nish (skip), Joseph Victor Ramsay, John F McGowan, George H Sherriff	9	1	0	8	2

== See also ==
- List of Commonwealth Games medallists in lawn bowls
- Lawn bowls at the Commonwealth Games
