= George Carter (bowls) =

New Zealand lawn bowls player (1883–1935)

Personal information
- Born: George Henry Carter; 1883 Victoria, Australia
- Died: 1 May 1935 (aged 52) Auckland, New Zealand
- Occupation: Accountant
- Spouse: Charlotte Ella McKenzie (m. 1906)
- Relatives: John McKenzie (brother-in-law); Roy McKenzie (nephew); Peter McKenzie (great-nephew)

Sport
- Country: New Zealand
- Sport: Lawn bowls
- Club: Carlton Bowling Club

George Henry Carter (1883 – 1 May 1935) was a New Zealand lawn bowls player who competed for his country at the 1934 British Empire Games. Professionally, he was an accountant and a director of the McKenzies retail chain.

== Early life, family, and business activities ==
Carter was born in Australia in about 1883. In 1906, he married Charlotte Ella McKenzie, who, with her brother John, had founded a fancy goods store in Melbourne the previous year. Carter was John McKenzie's accountant, and the store would eventually grow to become the J.R. McKenzie retail chain in New Zealand, with Carter as one of its directors.

George and Ella Carter went on two have two children. The Carters moved to New Zealand not long after John McKenzie relocated his business across the Tasman, living first in Wellington. Carter retired from day-to-day involvement with J.R. McKenzie Ltd in about 1928, while remaining a director of the company, and moved to Auckland.

== Lawn bowls ==
A member of the Carlton Bowling Club in Auckland, Carter was the skip of the men's four—alongside Billy Dillicar, Harold Grocott and George Pollard—that represented New Zealand at the 1934 British Empire Games in London. They won four of their nine round-robin matches, finishing in fifth place.

== Death ==
Carter died at his home in the Auckland suburb of Remuera on 1 May 1935, and his ashes were buried at Waikumete Cemetery. His wife, Ella, died in Wellington in 1972.
