= Percy Tomlinson =

English bowls player

Personal information
- Nationality: British (English)
- Born: 19 September 1882
- Died: 1 January 1961 (aged 78) Broadstairs, England
- Occupation(s): Farmer and butcher

Sport
- Sport: Lawn bowls
- Club: Margate BC
Medal record
Men's Lawn bowls
Representing England
British Empire Games
Gold medal – first place	1934 London	Fours

Percy Douglas Tomlinson (1882-1961) was an English bowls player who competed in the British Empire Games.

== Bowls career ==
At the 1934 British Empire Games he won the gold medal in the rinks (fours) event with Robert Slater, Ernie Gudgeon and Fred Biggin.
