= Frank Jones (cyclist) =

Welsh cyclist

Personal information
- Nationality: British (Welsh)
- Born: 25 April 1907 Wales
- Died: November 1987 (aged 80) Glamorgan, Wales

Sport
- Sport: Cycling
- Club: Glamorgan Road Club, Cardiff; Cardiff Ajax CC

Frank Osborne Jones (25 April 1907 – November 1987) was an international cyclist from Wales who competed at the British Empire Games (now the Commonwealth Games).

== Biography ==
Jones was a member of the Glamorgan Road Club in Cardiff and primarily raced on roads, winning various distance events. In 1939 he was a railway clerk, living at 56 Rhydypenan Road in Cardiff and continued racing up to and occasionally during World War II.

Jones was one of two cycling representatives, alongside Ernest Brown for the 1934 Welsh Team at the 1934 British Empire Games in London, participating in the time trial and scratch events.

In later years, Jones officiated at the Cardiff Track League and was a member of the South Wales Cycling Veterans Association. He died in November 1987.
