= Billy Dillicar =

NZ lawn bowls player

Personal information
- Full name: William Wood Dillicar
- Born: 21 June 1881; Hamilton, New Zealand
- Died: 28 July 1962 (aged 81); Hamilton, New Zealand
- Occupation: Grocer
- Spouse(s): 1. Ida May Francis; (m. 1913; div. 1925): 2. Marjorie Evelyn Arey; (m. 1935; died 1953)
- Relative(s): Harold Turbott (nephew); Harry Turbott (great-nephew)

Sport
- Country: New Zealand
- Sport: Lawn bowls
- Club: Whitiora Bowling Club, Hamilton

William Wood Dillicar (21 June 1881 – 28 July 1962) was a New Zealand lawn bowls player who competed for his country at the 1934 British Empire Games.

== Early life and family ==
Born on 21 June 1881, Dillicar was the son of Richard and Mary Ann Dillicar who had settled in Hamilton the previous year. On 24 March 1913, he married Ida May Francis at the Congregational Church, Palmerston North, but they divorced in 1925. Dillicar went on to marry Marjorie Evelyn Arey, the daughter of bookseller William Ewbank Arey and sister-in-law of Roderick Braithwaite, in Auckland on 20 June 1935.

Dillicar's sister, Alice, was the mother of Harold Turbott.

== Lawn bowls ==
A member of the Whitiora Bowling Club, Dillicar was selected to represent New Zealand in the men's fours at the 1934 British Empire Games in London, alongside three bowlers from Auckland's Carlton Bowling Club: namely Harold Grocott, George Pollard, and George Carter (skip). At the Games, they won four of their nine round-robin matches to finish in fifth place.

== Other activities ==
With his brother, Dillicar established the Hamilton grocers' firm of Dillicar Brothers. For many years, Dillicar was the bellringer at St Paul's Methodist church in Hamilton. He also served as a member of the Hamilton Borough Council from 1931 to 1945, when he resigned due to poor health.

== Death ==
Dillicar died on 28 July 1962, and he was buried at Hamilton West Cemetery. He had been predeceased by his second wife, Marjorie, in 1953.
