= Fred Biggin =

English international lawn bowls player

Personal information
- Nationality: British (English)
- Born: 16 February 1869 Derbyshire, England
- Died: 30 September 1968 (aged 99) London, England

Sport
- Sport: Lawn bowls
- Club: Temple BC
Medal record
Men's Lawn bowls
Representing (England)
British Empire Games
Gold medal – first place	1934 London	Rinks/Fours

Frederick Biggin (16 February 1869 – 30 September 1968), was an English international lawn bowls player who competed in the 1934 British Empire Games.

== Bowls career ==
At the 1934 British Empire Games he won the gold medal in the rinks/fours event with Robert Slater, Ernie Gudgeon and Percy Tomlinson.

He was the Surrey singles champion and was a member of the Temple Bowls Club.

== Personal life ==
He worked in Insurance by trade and lived at 108 Cheviot Road, West Norwood.
