= William Lowe (bowls) =

Scottish lawn bowler

Personal information
- Nationality: British (Scottish)

Sport
- Sport: Lawn bowls
- Club: Musselburgh BC
Medal record
Men's Lawn bowls
Representing Scotland
Commonwealth Games
Bronze medal – third place	1934 London	rinks (fours)

William S. Lowe was a Scottish Lawn bowls international who competed in the 1934 British Empire Games.

== Bowls career ==
Lowe was a member of the Musselburgh Bowls Club.

He skipped the Scottish four at the 1934 British Empire Games and won the bronze medal in the rinks (fours) event with Charles Tait, James Morrison and James Brown.
