= Harold Brainsby =

New Zealand field athlete

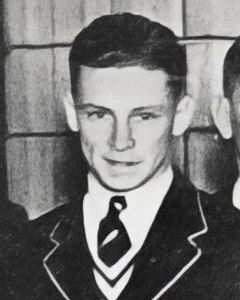
- Brainsby in 1934

Personal information
- Full name: Harold Kingsford Brainsby
- Born: 5 December 1910 Hansworth, Staffordshire, England
- Died: 3 April 1975 (aged 64) Auckland, New Zealand
- Spouse: Mary Priscilla Wrightson (m. 1940)

Sport
- Country: New Zealand
- Sport: Athletics
- Event(s): Triple jump, long jump

Achievements and titles
- National finals: Triple jump champion (1934, 1935)
Medal record
Men's athletics
Representing New Zealand
British Empire Games
Bronze medal – third place	1934 London	Triple jump

Harold Kingsford Brainsby (5 December 1910 – 3 April 1975) was a New Zealand field athlete who won a bronze medal in the triple jump at the 1934 British Empire Games in London.

== Early life and family ==
Born in Handsworth on the outskirts of Birmingham, England, in 1910, Brainsby was the son of Edith Anna (née Kingsford) and Arthur Todd Brainsby, a Baptist minister. The family emigrated to New Zealand in 1911. Educated at Whangarei High School, Brainsby went on to study at Auckland University College, graduating with a Bachelor of Arts in 1934, and a Bachelor of Laws and Diploma of Journalism in 1938.

On 23 March 1940, Brainsby married Mary Priscilla Wrightson at St Aidan's Church in the Auckland suburb of Remuera, They adopted a daughter in 1957 and divorced in 1960. Harold remarried Diana Kelly and the couple had one son.

== Athletics ==
Brainsby competed for New Zealand at the 1934 British Empire Games, where he won the bronze medal in the triple jump, with a distance of 47 feet 11 1/2 inches (14.62 m). He also competed in the long jump, finishing in seventh place with a leap of 21 feet 6 1/2 inches (6.57 m).

He won the triple jump title at the national athletics championships in 1934 and 1935, and was second in the same event but the leading New Zealander (behind Japanese athlete Kenshi Togami) in 1937.

== Later life and death ==
Brainsby served with the 21st Rifle Battalion, 2nd New Zealand Expeditionary Force during World War II. He rose from the rank of sergeant to become a major on General Freyberg's staff, and returned to New Zealand after the battle of El Alamein. Following a career as an illustrator and journalist for the Auckland Star, New Zealand Herald, and Auckland Weekly News, in 1952 he joined the Highland Park law firm of Melville Churton, which, in 1962, became Churton Brainsby & Hart.

A noted contract bridge player, Brainsby was a member of the Auckland four that won the New Zealand championship on several occasions. He also served as president of the Northern Bridge Club.

Brainsby died in Auckland on 3 April 1975, and his body was cremated at Purewa Crematorium.
