= Albert Shillington =

Northern Irish athlete

Bert Shillington
Personal information
- Nationality: British (Northern Irish)
- Born: c.1912

Sport
- Sport: Athletics
- Event: Long jump/Triple jump
- Club: Willowfield Temperance Harriers; 9th Old Boys

Albert Shillington (c.1912 – date of death unknown) was a Northern Irish athlete who competed in the 1934 British Empire Games and 1938 British Empire Games.

== Biography ==
Shillington ran for the athletics team of the Willowfield Temperance Harriers and was an all-round athlete. In 1934, he set a Northern Irish high jump record of 5ft. 5ins.

Shillington represented Northern Ireland at the 1934 British Empire Games, in the long jump and triple jump events.

He was one of only four athletes to represent Northern Ireland at the 1938 British Empire Games, partly due to a time of political change that saw the Irish Free State recently becoming Ireland. He took part in the athletics programme and finished sixth in the triple jump competition. At the time of the Games he was a wholesale draper and lived at 5 Sunnyside Drive, Belfast.

During World War II he continued to compete for the 9th Old Boys club and became a six-times champion of Ireland, twice over the long jump in 1942 and 1943 and also four times over the triple jump from 1942 to 1945 at the Irish Athletics Championships.
