= Charles Abbott (bowls) =

South African lawn bowls player

Personal information
- Nationality: South African
- Born: 1867
- Occupation: Building contractor

Sport
- Sport: Lawn bowls
Medal record
Men's Lawn bowls
Representing (South Africa)
British Empire Games
Bronze medal – third place	1934 London	Singles

Charles Albert Abbott (1867 – ?) was a South African international lawn bowls player who competed in the 1934 British Empire Games.

== Bowls career ==
At the 1934 British Empire Games he won the bronze medal in the singles event.

== Personal life ==
He was a building contractor by trade. He was resident in Bournemouth during the Games and travelled to the event with his wife Emma.
