= Robert Taylor (bowls) =

Irish lawn bowls player

Personal information
- Nationality: Northern Irish

Sport
- Sport: Lawn bowls
- Club: Shatfesbury BC

Robert David Taylor was a Lawn bowls international from Northern Ireland who competed at the British Empire Games (now the Commonwealth Games).

== Biography ==
Taylor was a member of the Shatfesbury Bowls Club in Belfast and in 1933 represented Ireland at the 1933 International Games.

Taylor then represented the 1934 Northern Irish Team at the 1934 British Empire Games in London, participating in the pairs event with John Downing, finishing in sixth place.

In January 1939, Taylor was voted in as the Chairman of Shaftesbury BC and would later become honorary secretary of the club.
