= 1952 Birthday Honours (New Zealand) =

Award list for New Zealand

The 1952 Queen's Birthday Honours in New Zealand, celebrating the official birthday of Elizabeth II, were appointments made by the Queen on the advice of the New Zealand government to various orders and honours to reward and highlight good works by New Zealanders. They were the first birthday honours of the new queen's reign, and were announced on 5 June 1952.

The recipients of honours are displayed here as they were styled before their new honour.

== Knight Bachelor ==
- The Honourable Matthew Henry Oram MBE – Speaker of the House of Representatives.
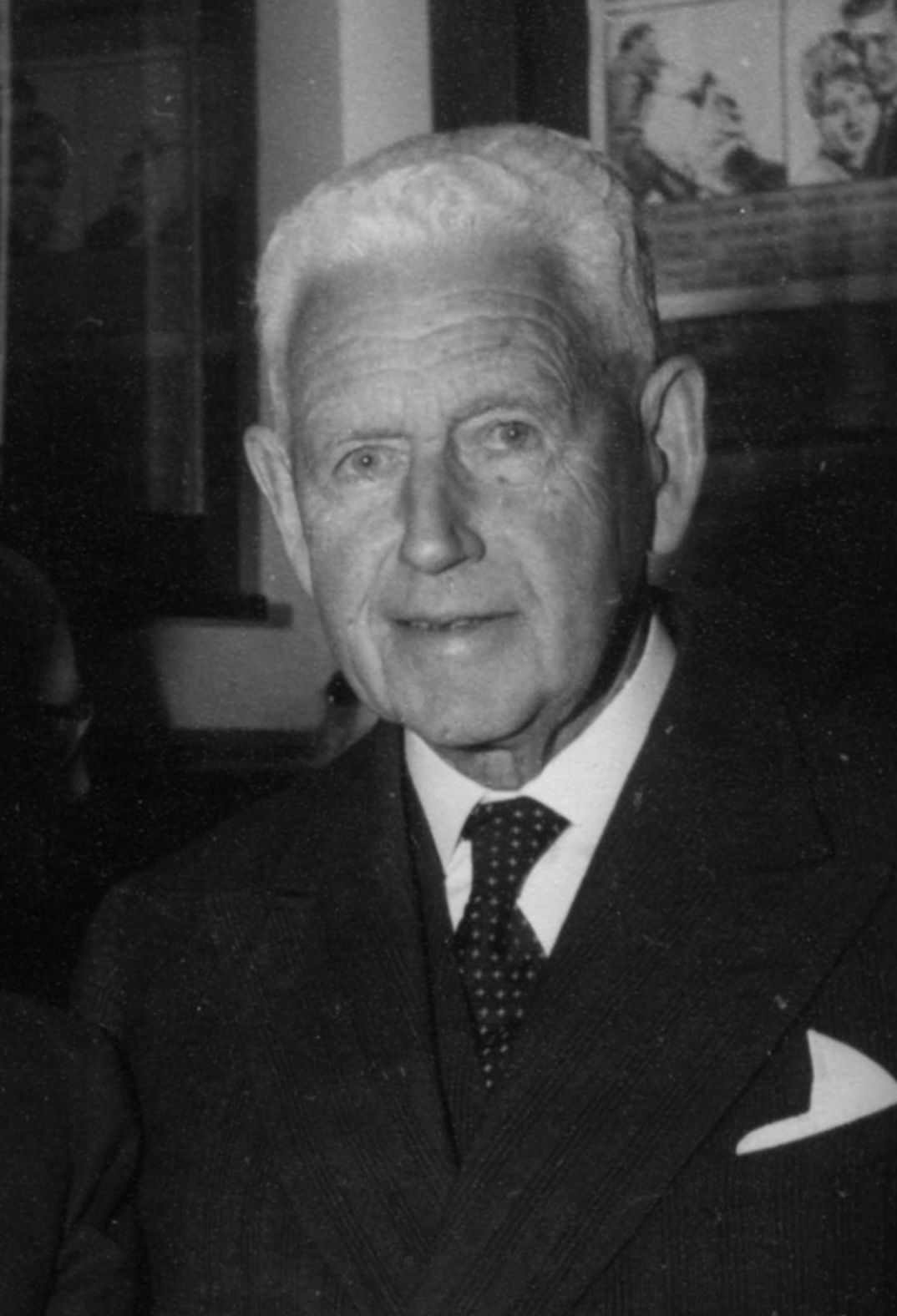
Sir Matthew Oram

== Order of Saint Michael and Saint George ==
=== Knight Commander (KCMG) ===
- The Right Honourable William Joseph Jordan – High Commissioner in London for New Zealand (1936–1951).
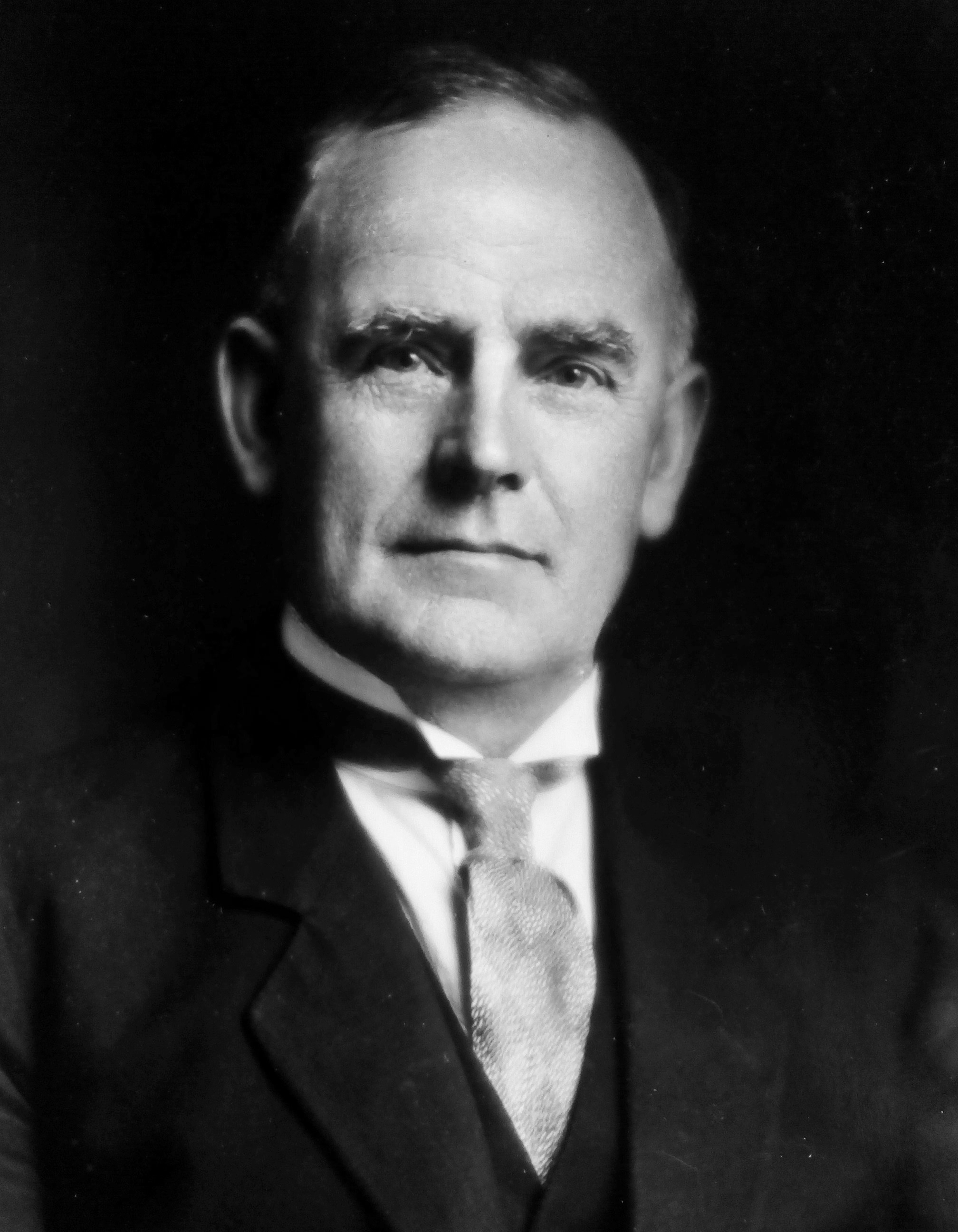
Sir William Jordan

=== Companion (CMG) ===
- Edgar Ravenswood McKillop OBE – Commissioner of Works.
- The Most Reverend Dr Campbell West West-Watson DD – Primate, Archbishop and Metropolitan of New Zealand (1940–1951).
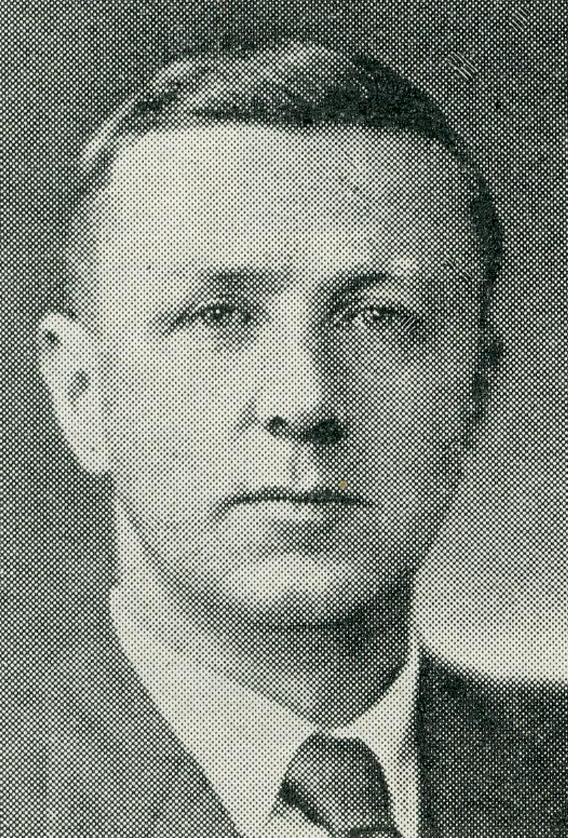
Edgar McKillop

== Order of the British Empire ==
=== Commander (CBE) ===
Civil division

- Professor Eric Raymond Hudson – of Canterbury Agricultural College, Lincoln. For services to agriculture.
- Noel Rutherford Jameson – chairman of the New Zealand Wool Board and deputy chairman of the Wool Commission.
- Leonard John Wild OBE – of Ōtaki. For services to education and agriculture.

Military division

- Surgeon Captain Eric Snow McPhail VRD MB ChB – Royal New Zealand Navy.
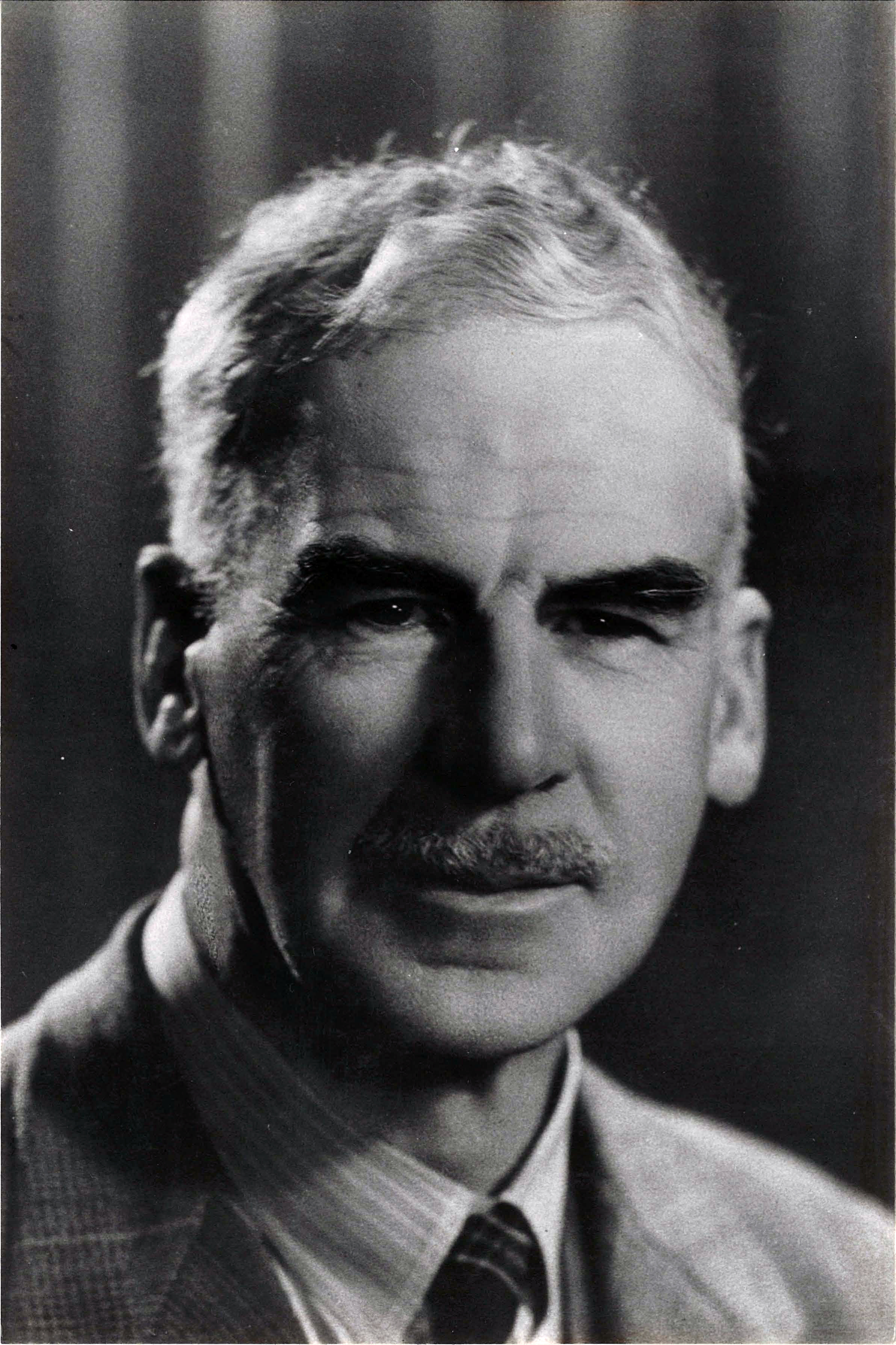
Eric Hudson

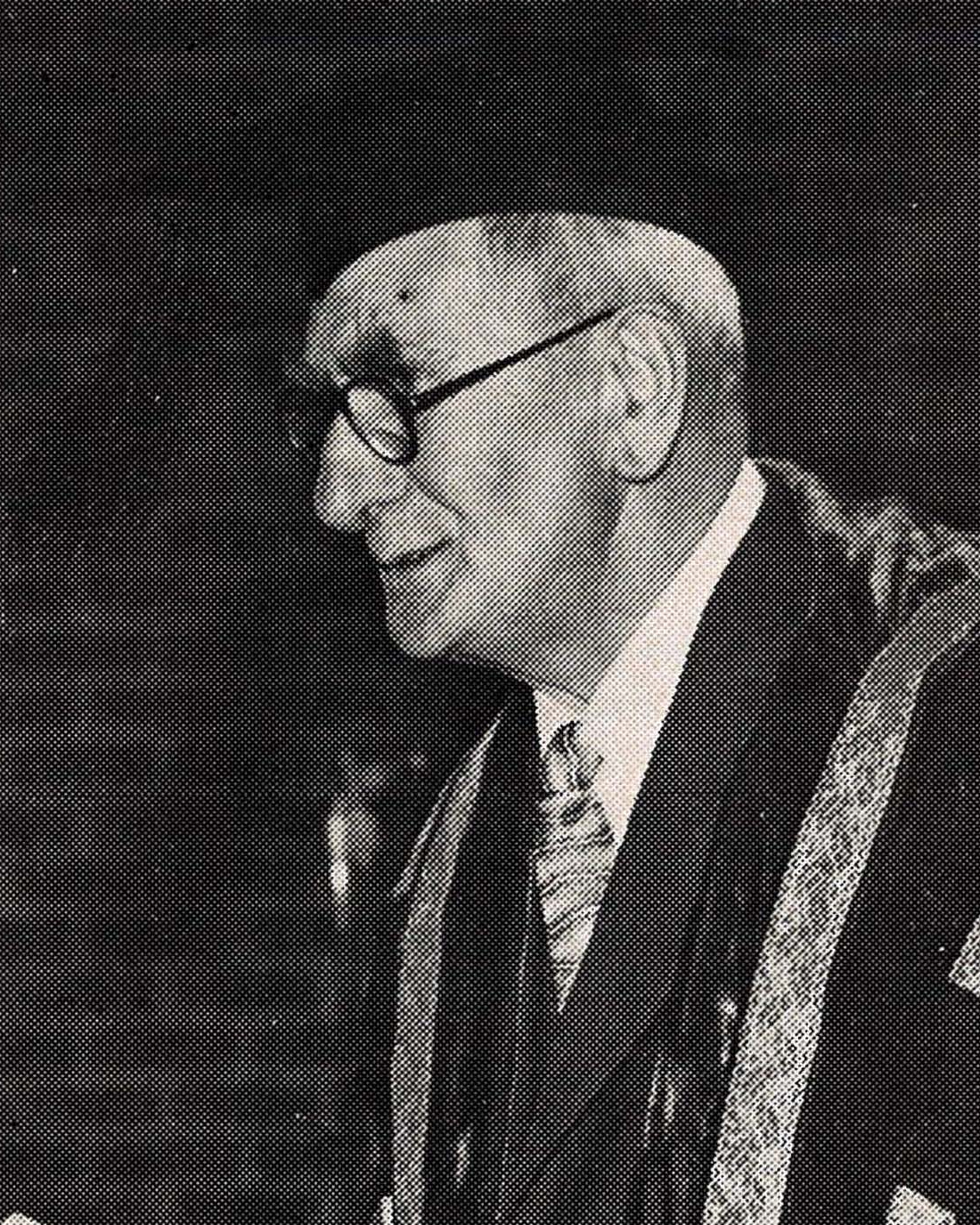
Leonard Wild

=== Officer (OBE) ===
Civil division

- Alfred Thomas Carroll – of Wairoa. For services to the Māori race.
- Geoffrey Jasper St Clair Fisher MB ChB – a gynaecologist in Auckland.
- Flora McMillan Forde – president of the National Council of Women.
- Alfred Onslow Glasse MC – of Auckland. For services in the field of engineering.
- Ronald Joseph Macdonald JP – of Dannevirke. For services to the farming industry.
- William Smith MacGregor MacGibbon – of Christchurch. For services to commerce and local government.
- Norman Alfred McKenzie – of Napier. For services to sport in New Zealand.
- Geoffrey Tremaine – of Palmerston North. For services to local government.
- Edward Earle Vaile. For services to the community in Auckland.
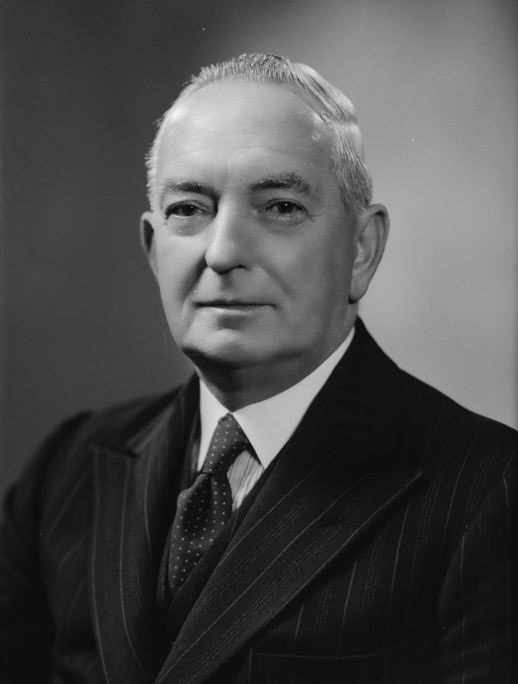
Bill MacGibbon

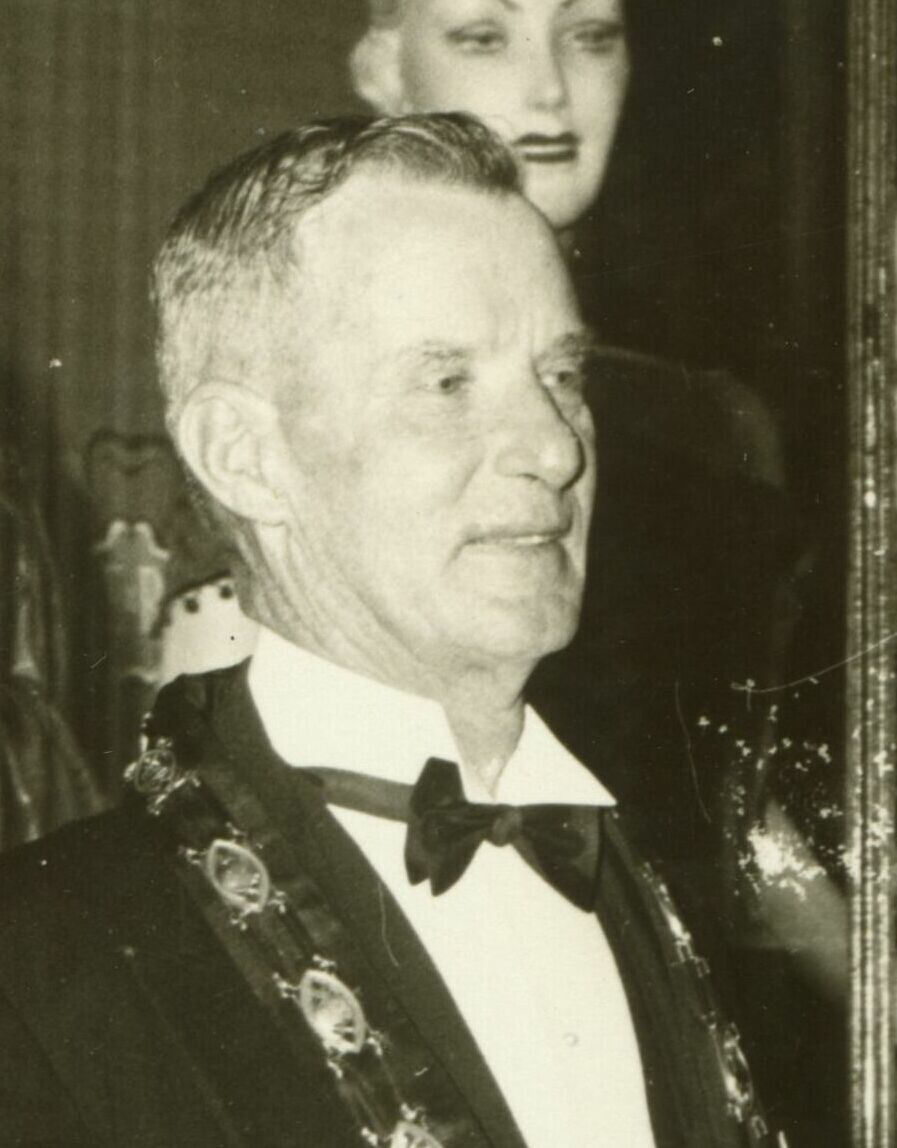
Geoffrey Tremaine

Military division

- Commander John Michael Sharpey-Schafer – Royal Navy.
- Lieutenant-Colonel Walter Gordon Morrison – New Zealand Territorial Force.
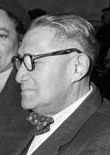
Turi Carroll

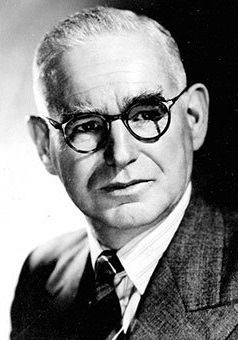
Fred Glasse

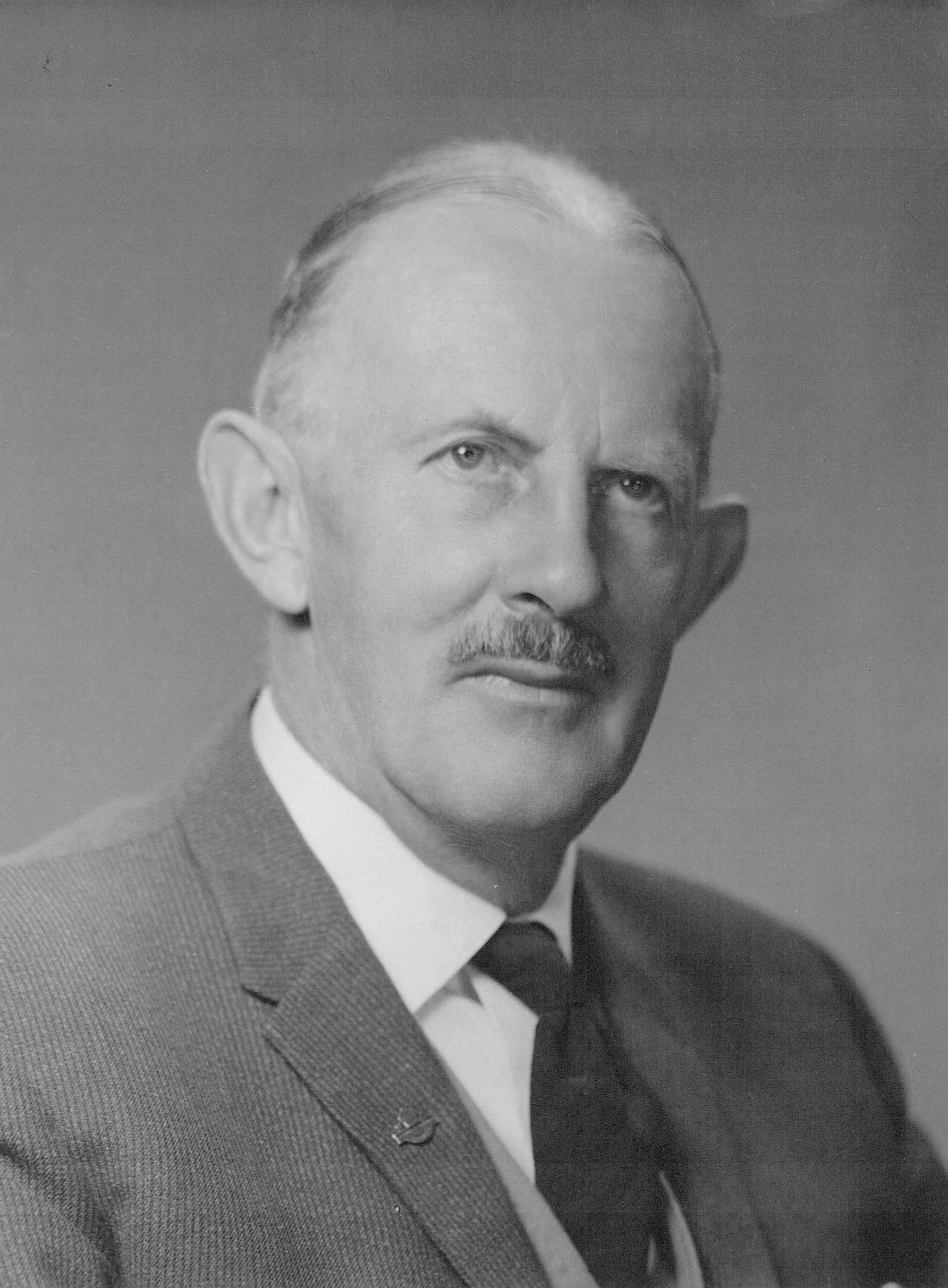
Gordon Morrison

=== Member (MBE) ===
Civil division

- Clarice Mary Anderson – of Auckland. For social welfare services.
- Hilda Daniels – of Christchurch. For services to the Māori people in the field of education.
- Mary Florence Geard. For services to the community in Northland.
- Horace Grocott. For services in connection with the Boys' Brigade movement in New Zealand.
- Anne Amelia Hambly – of Auckland. For social welfare services.
- Vivian Simeon Jacobs – of Dunedin. For social welfare services.
- William David Stoney Johnston MD. For services to the community in Nelson.
- Ethel Margaret Kinross – of Havelock North. For services to the Māori people in the field of education.
- Ernest Loader JP – of Taihape. For services to local government.
- Charlton Douglas Morpeth JP – of Wellington. For services to the community. Deceased: appointment dated 19 May 1952.
- Charles Stephen Morris JP – of Newton, Auckland. For services to the community, especially in the field of education.
- Mavis Helen Pairman JP – of Mangaweka. For services to the community.
- Alma Evelyne Penketh – of Palmerston North. For social welfare services, especially in connection with women's organisations.
- Elsie Erica Pryor – matron of the Waipiata Sanatorium for 16 years.
- George Claude Russell – of Christchurch. For services to the community.
- Ida Russell – Memorial Hospital, Hastings. For services in the nursing profession.
- Maude Frances Tait JP – president of the women's branch, New Zealand Borstal Association.
- Clifford Hudson Tate – president of the Town Clerks' Association.

Military division

- Captain (temporary Major) Morley Guy Fowler – Royal New Zealand Armoured Corps.
- Warrant Officer First Class William Galloway – New Zealand Regiment.
- Lieutenant Arthur Trevor Slater – New Zealand Territorial Force.
- Flight Lieutenant Clifford Maurice Crawford – Royal New Zealand Air Force.
- Flight Lieutenant Trevelyn William Tremayne – New Zealand Territorial Air Force.
- Warrant Officer Desmond Owen Hardwick – Royal New Zealand Air Force.

== Companion of the Imperial Service Order (ISO) ==
- Robert Adams Patterson – lately government architect and a member of the Town Planning Board.
- Tipi Tainui Ropiha – under-secretary of Māori Affairs.

== British Empire Medal (BEM) ==
Military division

- Chief Petty Officer Stoker Mechanic Harold Edward Groves – Royal New Zealand Navy.
- Chief Petty Officer Charles Long – Royal New Zealand Navy.
- Chief Yeoman of Signals John James O'Meara – Royal New Zealand Naval Volunteer Reserve.
- Flight Sergeant Walter James Croft – Royal New Zealand Air Force.

== Queen's Commendation for Valuable Service in the Air ==
- Flying Officer Utiku Albert Potaka – Royal New Zealand Air Force.
- Flight Sergeant Engineer Donald John Macleod – Royal New Zealand Air Force.
