= Robert Slater (bowls) =

English international lawn bowls player

Personal information
- Nationality: British (English)

Sport
- Sport: Lawn bowls
- Club: Callenders BC
Medal record
Men's Lawn bowls
Representing (England)
British Empire Games
Gold medal – first place	1934 London	Rinks/Fours

Robert Slater was an English international lawn bowls player who competed in the 1934 British Empire Games.

== Bowls career ==
At the 1934 British Empire Games he won the gold medal in the rinks/fours event with Ernie Gudgeon, Percy Tomlinson and Fred Biggin.

He was the 1933 and 1934 pairs champion with Billy Buckell at the National Championships representing Callenders Bowling Club, Kent and was also twice Kent County champion.
