= William Hutchinson (bowls) =

Personal information
- Nationality: Canada
- Born: 1877
- Died: Unknown
- Occupation: Superintendent

Sport
- Sport: Lawn bowls
Medal record
Men's Lawn bowls
Representing (Canada)
British Empire Games
Silver medal – second place	1934 London	Pairs

William G. Hutchinson (1877-date of death unknown), was a Canadian international lawn bowls player who competed in the 1934 British Empire Games.

== Bowls career ==
At the 1934 British Empire Games he won the silver medal in the pairs event with Alfred Langford.

== Personal life ==
He was a superintendent by trade and was resident at the Strand Hotel during the Games along with most of the other Canadian bowlers.
