= Len Keys =

New Zealand lawn bowls player

Personal information
- Born: Leonard John Keys; 3 August 1880 Pātea, New Zealand
- Died: 26 January 1958 (aged 77) Auckland, New Zealand
- Occupation(s): Grocer; Bus operator
- Spouse: Sarah Margery McMaster (m. 1903)

Sport
- Country: New Zealand
- Sport: Lawn bowls
- Club: Auckland Bowling Club

Achievements and titles
- National finals: Fours champion (1932)

Leonard John Keys (3 August 1880 – 26 January 1958) was a New Zealand lawn bowls player who competed for his country at the 1934 British Empire Games. However, he is more notable as a businessman and one of the pioneers of passenger bus services in Auckland.

== Early life and family ==
Born in Pātea on 3 August 1880, Keys was the son of Harriet Jane Keys (née Watson) and John Edward Keys. He grew up in the Thames area, before serving an apprenticeship as a grocer in Auckland. In 1903, he married Sarah Margery McMaster, and the couple went on to have three children.

== Lawn bowls ==
Keys was a member of the Auckland Bowling Club team that won the men's fours title at the 1932 national lawn bowls championships, held in Christchurch. He went on to represent New Zealand in the men's singles at the 1934 British Empire Games in London. He lost all nine of his round-robin matches, finishing in tenth, and last, place.

== Business activities ==
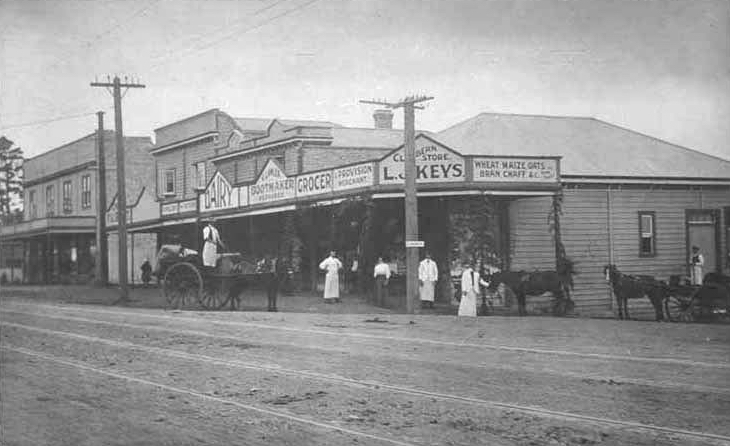
Keys' grocery store in Remuera, 1914

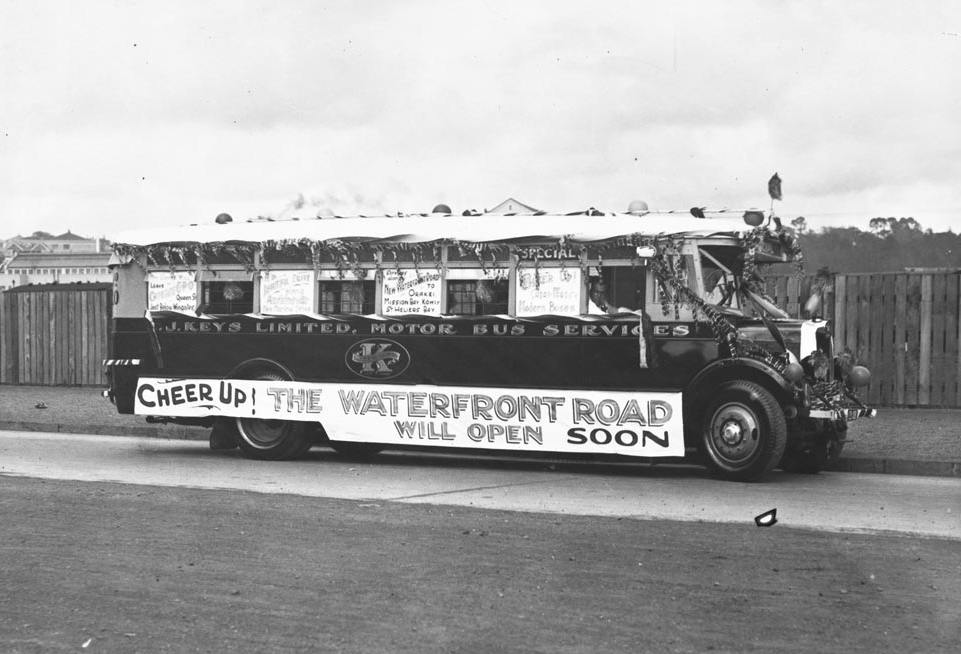
L.J. Keys Limited motor bus in 1931, decorated to celebrate the imminent opening of Tamaki Drive

Keys ran a grocery business in the Auckland suburb of Remuera, on the corner of Remuera and Clonbern Roads, between 1907 and 1914. The following year, he established a passenger bus service running between Remuera and Saint Heliers, and in 1923 began a service with three buses from Saint Heliers into central Auckland. In 1925, ferry services from Saint Heliers to the city ceased operation, and Keys expanded his bus service on the route. By 1949, when his business was taken over by the Auckland Transport Board, Keys had a fleet of about 40 buses.

Keys served as a member of the Tamaki West Road Board for nine years, and was a member of the Auckland Chamber of Commerce and the Omnibus Proprietors' Association.

== Death ==
Keys died on 26 January 1958, and his ashes were buried at Purewa Cemetery. His wife, Margery, died in 1969.

== Honorific eponym ==
Keys Terrace in the Auckland suburb of Saint Heliers is named in Keys' honour. Part of Devore Street in Saint Heliers was renamed Leonard Keys Terrace in 1958, but after five months the street's name was shortened to Keys Terrace.
