= Ernest Higgins (cyclist) =

British cyclist

Personal information
- Nationality: British (English)
- Born: 19 April 1908 Manchester, England
- Died: 1996 (aged 88) Manchester, England

Sport
- Sport: Cycling
- Club: Manchester Wheelers
Medal record
Cycling
Representing England
British Empire Games
Gold medal – first place	1934 London	1000 yards sprint

Ernest Wilfred Higgins (1908 – 1996) was an English cyclist who competed for England.

== Cycling career ==
Higgins, born in Manchester, rode for the Manchester Wheelers Club.

He represented England at the 1934 British Empire Games in London, where he competed in the 1000 yards sprint. winning a gold medal.
