= William Harvell =

British cyclist

Personal information
- Nationality: British (English)
- Born: 25 September 1907 Farnham, Surrey, England
- Died: 13 May 1985 (aged 77) Portsmouth, England

Sport
- Sport: Cycling
- Event(s): Track / Tandem, Scratch
- Club: Poole Wheelers
Medal record
Representing Great Britain
Men's Track cycling
Bronze medal – third place	1932 Los Angeles	team pursuit
Representing England
British Empire Games
Bronze medal – third place	1934 London	10 Miles Scratch

William Gladstone Harvell (25 September 1907 – 13 May 1985) was a British cyclist who competed in the 1932 Summer Olympics.

== Biography ==
Harvell was born in Farnham, Surrey, England and was a member of the Poole Wheelers.

He represented England at the 1934 British Empire Games in London, where he competed in the 10 mile Scratch event. winning a bronze medal.

Harvell was a British track champion, winning the British National Team Pursuit Championships in 1933 as part of the Poole Wheelers team.
