= Ernest Brown (cyclist) =

Welsh cyclist

Personal information
- Nationality: British (Welsh)
- Born: Wales

Sport
- Sport: Cycling / Rugby union
- Club: Newport AC; Newport Wheelers; Newport RFC

Ernest H. Brown was a rugby player and international cyclist from Wales, who competed at the British Empire Games (now the Commonwealth Games).

== Biography ==
Brown attended St Woolos Primary School and Newport Secondary School in Newport. He was the 1931, 1933 and 1934 quarter mile cycling champion of Wales.

Brown won the 1933 NCU quarter-mile cycle championship, riding for the Newport Athletic Club. In 1934, Brown was riding for Newport Wheelers when he was initially named as a reserve for the 1934 British Empire Games.

However, he was called up compete and subsequently was only one of two cycling representatives, alongside Frank Jones for the 1934 Welsh Team at the British Empire Games in London, participating in the time trial and scratch events.

In addition to cycling, Brown was a significant rugby player, playing several times for Newport RFC in 1934 and the following year in 1935 was named as the captain of Newport United (the B team). He was an engine cleaner by profession and worked at Newport Docks.
