= Denis Corr =

Northern Irish cyclist

Personal information
- Nationality: Northern Irish
- Born: 29 March 1908 Portadown, Ireland
- Died: 30 June 1981 (aged 73) Armagh, Northern Ireland

Sport
- Sport: Cycling
- Club: R.U.C

Denis John Corr (29 March 1908 – 30 June 1981) was an international cyclist from Ireland who competed at the British Empire Games (now the Commonwealth Games).

== Biography ==
Corr from Portadown was a constable with the Royal Ulster Constabulary and in 1934 won the Northern Ireland 1 mile and 5 mile championships, and two weeks later won the quarter mile championship and the half-mile title.

Corr was the sole cycling representative for the 1934 Northern Irish Team at the 1934 British Empire Games in London, participating in the sprint, time trial and scratch events.

In 1936 he won the 1,000 yards Northern Irish championship.

Corr farmed at Derryvore and lived at Kingsway Dive in Portadown. He died in 1981.
