= William Tagg (cyclist) =

Scottish cyclist (1909–1982)

Personal information
- Nationality: Scottish
- Born: 24 March 1909 Whiteinch, Glasgow, Scotland
- Died: 1982 (aged 72–73) Maidstone, Kent, England

Sport
- Club: Glasgow Wheelers; Ivy CC

William Wilson Tagg also known as Willie Tagg (24 March 1909 – 1982) was an international cyclist from Scotland who competed at the British Empire Games (now the Commonwealth Games).

== Biography ==
Tagg was a member of the Glasgow Wheelers and in 1931 won the Glasgow Transport 1,000 yards championship. Additionally, he won the 3 miles at the Glasgow Police Sports annual event when riding for Ivy Cycling Club of Glasgow and was a Scottish champion.

Tagg was the sole cycling representative for the 1934 Scottish Team at the 1934 British Empire Games in London, participating in the sprint, time trial and scratch events.

Tagg continued competing at the highest levels after the games, winning the 1936 Western cycling championships.
