= Northern Ireland at the 1934 British Empire Games =

- CG code: NIR
- CGA: Northern Ireland Commonwealth Games Council
- Website: nicgc.org

in London, England
- Medals Ranked 9th: Gold 0 Silver 1 Bronze 2 Total 3

British Empire Games appearances
- 1934; 1938; 1950; 1954; 1958; 1962; 1966; 1970; 1974; 1978; 1982; 1986; 1990; 1994; 1998; 2002; 2006; 2010; 2014; 2018; 2022; 2026; 2030

Other related appearances
- Ireland (1930)

Northern Ireland competed at the 1934 British Empire Games in London, from 4 to 11 August 1934. Northern Ireland made its first appearance at the British Empire Games, although in 1930 an Irish team consisting of athletes from the Irish Free State had competed. Further politicial unrest had resulted in a team from Northern Ireland competing in 1934, with one athlete from the Irish Free State.

Northern Ireland came 9th overall in the games, with one silver medal and two bronze medals.

== Medalists ==
Medal	Name	Sport	Event	Date
Silver	Cecil Curran; Charlie Clawson; George Watson; Percy Watson	Lawn Bowls	Men's Fours	
Bronze	Billy Duncan	Boxing	Welterweight	
Bronze	Jimmy Magill	Boxing	Middleweight	

== Team ==
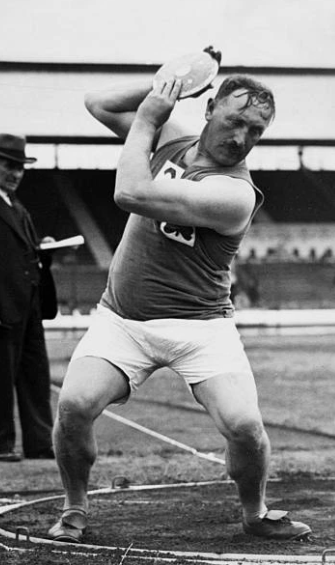
Bermingham from the Irish Free State, competed in the discus

=== Athletics ===
Athlete	Events	Club	Medals
Ian Bell	100 yards		
Paddy Bermingham	discus throw	Dublin Metropolitan Guards	
Edward Boyce	long jump	North Belfast Harriers	
Jack Parker	3 miles	Brighton & County Harriers	
Albert Shillington	triple jump, long jump	Willowfield Temperance Harriers	
Maurice Tait	long jump		

Results

Track and road events

Athlete	Event	Heat		Semifinal		Final	
Athlete	Event	Result	Rank	Result	Rank	Result	Rank
Ian Bell	100 Yard	???	5	Did not advance			
Jack Parker	3 Mile	—N/a	—N/a	—N/a	—N/a	???	5

Field Events

Athlete	Event	Final	
Athlete	Event	Distance	Rank
Paddy Bermingham	Discus		
Edward Boyce	Long Jump	DNS	
Albert Shillington	Long Jump		
Maurice Tait	Long Jump		
Edward Boyce	Triple Jump	13.80	4
Albert Shillington	Triple Jump	13.69	6

=== Boxing ===
Athlete	Events	Club	Medals
Billy Duncan	Welterweight	Royal Ulster Constabulary	Bronze medal
Jimmy Magill	Middleweight	Royal Ulster Constabulary	Bronze medal

=== Cycling ===
Athlete	Events	Club	Medals
Denis Corr	time trial, sprint, scratch	Royal Ulster Constabulary	

=== Lawn Bowls ===
Athlete	Events	Club	Medals
Charlie Clawson	Fours/rinks	Shaftesbury BC	Silver medal
Cecil Curran	Fours/rinks	Shaftesbury BC	Silver medal
John Downing	pairs	Shatfesbury BC	6
John Rusk	singles	Cavehill BC	8
Robert Taylor	pairs	Shatfesbury BC	6
George Watson	Fours/rinks	Shatfesbury BC	Silver medal
Percy Watson	Fours/rinks	Cavehill BC	Silver medal
