= Bob McLeod (cyclist) =

Canadian cyclist (1913–1958)

Personal information
- Born: 5 May 1913 Toronto, Canada
- Died: 3 July 1958 (aged 45) Toronto, Canada

Cycling career
- Sport: Cycling
Medal record
Men's cycling
Representing Canada
British Empire Games
Gold medal – first place	1934 London	10 mile Scratch
Silver medal – second place	1934 London	Time Trial

Bob McLeod (5 May 1913 – 3 July 1958) was a Canadian cyclist. He competed in the 1000m time trial and the team pursuit events at the 1936 Summer Olympics. In 1934, McLeod won a gold medal in the 10 mile cycling event at the 1934 British Empire Games with a silver medal in the time trial event.

He was married to Mary, with whom he had 3 children. Wesley, Robert and Lynda.

In 2015, McLeod was posthumously inducted into the Canada's Sports Hall of Fame.
