= Horace Grocott =

New Zealand Baptist missionary, Boys' Brigade leader and postmaster

Horace Grocott MBE (7 April 1880 – 10 July 1963) was a New Zealand Baptist missionary, Boys' Brigade leader, and postmaster. He was born in Napier, New Zealand. Grocott was a missionary in Bolivia from 1909 to 1914.

In the 1952 Queen's Birthday Honours, Grocott was appointed a Member of the Order of the British Empire, for services to the Boys' Brigade movement in New Zealand.
