= Frank Grose =

New Zealand racing cyclist

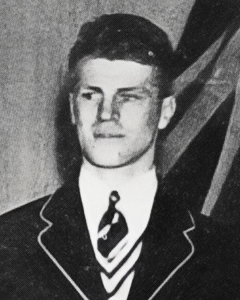
- Grose in 1934

Personal information
- Full name: Frank John Grose
- Born: 16 November 1909 Christchurch, New Zealand
- Died: 11 August 1952 (aged 42)
- Spouse: Elvira May Loose (m. 1935)

Sport
- Country: New Zealand
- Sport: Cycling

Frank John Grose (16 November 1909 – 11 August 1952) was a New Zealand road and track cyclist who represented his country at the 1934 and 1938 British Empire Games.

== Early life and family ==
Born in Christchurch on 16 November 1909, Grose was the son of Theodore Aldolphus Grose and Evelyn Maria Grose (née Hill). On 7 September 1935, he married Elvira May Loose at St Luke's Anglican Church, Christchurch.

== Cycling ==
He won the Round-the-Gorges race nine times, and was a champion over almost every distance from half a mile to 100 miles. In 1928 while in a training race with three other cyclists, they all crashed and Grose was seriously injured, breaking his pelvic bone and chipping his hip bone. While he overcame medical advice that his cycling career was ended, he was out of consideration for the 1928 Olympics.

At the 1934 British Empire Games in London, Grose competed in the 10 mile scratch race, 1 km time trial and 1000 yard championship; finishing fourth in each event. Four years later at the 1938 British Empire Games in Sydney, he competed in the 100 km road race but was forced to withdraw because of equipment failure, and was captain of the cycling team.

== Death ==
Grose died on 11 August 1952, and was buried at the Ruru Lawn Cemetery, Christchurch.
