= Charles Tait (bowls) =

Scottish lawn bowls player

Personal information
- Nationality: British (Scottish)

Sport
- Sport: Lawn bowls
- Club: Dudhope BC, Dundee
Medal record
Men's Lawn bowls
Representing Scotland
Commonwealth Games
Bronze medal – third place	1934 London	rinks (fours)

Charles W. Tait was a Scottish lawn bowls international who competed in the 1934 British Empire Games.

== Bowls career ==
Tait was a member of the Dudhope Bowls Club of Dundee.

At the 1934 British Empire Games he won the bronze medal in the rinks (fours) event with William Lowe, James Morrison and James Brown.
