= Jim Panton =

Canadian long jumper

Personal information
- Born: James Hoyes Panton III; February 22, 1914 North Battleford, Saskatchewan
- Died: January 14, 2008 (aged 93) Vancouver, British Columbia

Sport
- Country: Canada
- Sport: Athletics
- Event: Long jump
Medal record
British Empire Games
Silver medal – second place	1938 Sydney	Long jump

James Hoyes Panton III (February 22, 1914 – January 14, 2008) was a Canadian athlete of the 1930s.

Panton was born in North Battleford, Saskatchewan and attended the University of Washington. He was the Pacific Coast Conference North Division long jump champion in 1938, beating a field which included Olympic medalist Mack Robinson. His jump of 24 feet and 2.7 inches remained a conference record for nearly two decades.

At the 1938 British Empire Games in Sydney, Panton finished with a silver medal in the long jump. He had sat in the gold medal position by setting a British Empire Games record, but the mark was bettered 15 minutes later by countryman Harold Brown. In addition to long jump, he also placed seventh in the triple jump and tenth in the high jump.

Panton's career was interrupted by World War II, during which time he served in the Air Force. He retired from athletics after the war. Later in life he competed in masters swimming and won gold at the World Senior Games.

== See also ==
- List of Commonwealth Games medallists in athletics (men)
