= Noel Crump =

New Zealand swimmer

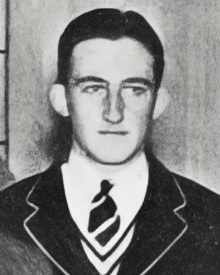
- Crump in 1934

Personal information
- Born: Spenceley Noel Stanley Crump; 18 December 1916 Auckland, New Zealand
- Died: 25 October 1995 (aged 78)
- Spouse: Eileen Hilda Wallace (m. 1943)

Sport
- Country: New Zealand
- Sport: Swimming
- Club: North Shore

Achievements and titles
- National finals: 100 yd freestyle champion (1934); 220 yd freestyle champion (1934)
Medal record
Representing New Zealand
Men's swimming
British Empire Games
Bronze medal – third place	1934 London	100 yd freestyle

Spenceley Noel Stanley Crump (18 December 1916 – 25 October 1995) was a New Zealand freestyle swimmer who represented his country at the 1934 British Empire Games, where he won a bronze medal, and at the 1938 British Empire Games.

== Early life and family ==
Born in the Auckland suburb of Ponsonby on 18 December 1916, Crump was the son of William Arthur Harry Crump and Ellen Spenceley Crump (née Walker). He was educated at Takapuna Grammar School, where he was the senior swimming champion in 1933, and was a member of the North Shore Amateur Swimming and Lifesaving Club. In July 1943, Crump married Eileen Hilda Wallace, a theatre sister at Rotorua Public Hospital, at Trinity Presbyterian Church, Cambridge.

== Swimming ==
At the 1934 New Zealand national swimming championships, Crump won both the 100 yards and 220 yards men's freestyle titles. He was then selected to represent New Zealand at the 1934 British Empire Games in London, where he won the bronze medal in the men's 100 yards freestyle, and was also a member of the New Zealand team that finished fifth in the 3 x 110 yards medley relay.

Four years later, he again competed at the British Empire Games, this time in Sydney, where he did not progress beyond the heats of the men's 110 yards and 440 yards freestyle events.

== Later life and death ==
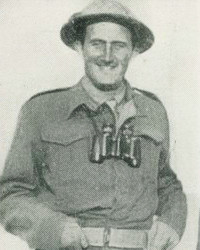
Crump in Libya during World War II

A bank officer, Crump served with the 2nd New Zealand Expeditionary Force during World War II. He embarked as a second lieutenant with the first echelon, and saw active service in Greece, Crete, Egypt, and Libya, before being invalided home in mid 1942. Promoted to the rank of captain, he then served as adjutant at the Raventhorpe Convalescent Depot in Bombay.

Crump died on 25 October 1995, and his body was cremated at the Karori Crematorium in Wellington.

== Legacy ==
Crump's swimming costume and bronze medal from the 1934 British Empire Games are held in the collection of the Museum of New Zealand Te Papa Tongarewa.

== See also ==
- List of Commonwealth Games medallists in swimming (men)
