= Ted Clayton (cyclist) =

South African cyclist (1911–1994)

Personal information
- Born: 6 January 1911 Paddington, London, England
- Died: 20 December 1994 (aged 83) Bellville, South Africa

Cycling career
- Sport: Cycling
Medal record
Representing South Africa
Men's track cycling
British Empire Games
Silver medal – second place	1934 London	10 mile scratch
Silver medal – second place	1934 London	1000 yard sprint
Bronze medal – third place	1934 London	Time trial

Ted Clayton (6 January 1911 – 20 December 1994) was a South African cyclist. He competed in the three events at the 1936 Summer Olympics.
