= Wattstown =

Coordinates: 51.634101°N 3.419632°W

Wattstown: Welsh: Aberllechau
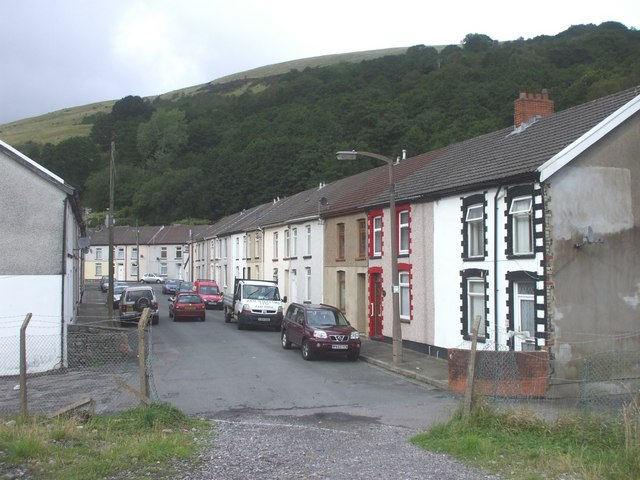

- Location within Rhondda Cynon Taf
- OS grid reference: ST018937
- Principal area: Rhondda Cynon Taf
- Preserved county: Mid Glamorgan
- Country: Wales
- Sovereign state: United Kingdom
- Post town: PORTH
- Postcode district: CF39
- Dialling code: 01443
- Police: South Wales
- Fire: South Wales
- Ambulance: Welsh
- UK Parliament: Rhondda and Ogmore
- Senedd Cymru – Welsh Parliament: Afan Ogwr Rhondda

Wattstown (Welsh: Aberllechau) is a village located in the Rhondda Valley in the county borough of Rhondda Cynon Taf, Wales. Located in the Rhondda Fach valley, it is a district of the community of Ynyshir. Prior to mid 19th century industrialisation the area was once little more than a wooded area, sparsely populated by farmsteads. With the coming of the coal industry Wattstown became a busy, densely populated village, but with the closure of the collieries Wattstown suffered an economic downturn that still affects the village today.

Wattstown is named after Edmund Hannay Watts, who at one time owned the National Colliery in Wattstown.

== Early history and industrialisation ==
The earliest evidence of human activity around what became Wattstown is found on the hillside at Carn Y Wiwer, overlooking the village; a small grouping of Bronze Age cairns are present and in the same vicinity are the remains of five platform houses; rudimentary, Medieval seasonal farm houses. During the Napoleonic Wars the land around Carn Y Wiwer was cultivated by farmers to produce additional crops. Prior to industrialisation, the area that became Wattstown was known as Pont Rhyd Y Cwch or Pont-Y-Cwtch.

Compared to other areas in the Rhondda, Wattstown was slow to be developed as a mining area. The first deep mine, the National Colliery, originally known as Cwtch Colliery before being renamed the Standard, was sunk sometime in the late 1870s by Richard Evans and first appeared on the Inspectors' Lists of Mines in 1880. The land on which the colliery was built, belonged to Crawshay Bailey and William Bailey, but the mine was owned by several different concerns, including the National Steam Coal Company and Watts & Company, who gave the village its name. Although Wattstown expanded to fulfill the working requirements of its colliery, it never expanded at the same rate as other areas. The village had its own church, dedicated to St. Thomas, built in 1896, schools, chapels and public houses, but its number of private residents was much lower than other similar settlements in the South Wales Valleys.

== National Colliery 1887 disaster ==
Wattstown suffered two mining disasters at the National Colliery. The first was on 18 February 1887, when the village was still known as 'Cwtch'. The accident occurred in-between the day and night shifts, which probably saved many lives as 200 men were yet to make their descent into the mine. The explosion was so powerful it damaged the winding gear which delayed the rescue by several hours. Once the rescuers were able to descend they managed to bring to the surface 38 men, 29 of whom were uninjured. In total, the death toll counted thirty nine men and boys, with a total of 6 injured. Although an inquest jury could not come to a conclusion to the cause of the explosion, in his report to the Secretary of State for the Home Department, F.A. Bosanquet, placed the cause of the disaster as an explosive cap being fired in an area where there had been a buildup of flammable gas.

== National Colliery 1905 disaster ==
On the 11 July 1905, just four months after the Cambrian Colliery disaster at Clydach Vale, an explosion at the National Colliery in Wattstown resulted in the deaths of 119 men and boys. Only three people were rescued from the mine, but two later died of their injuries, leaving Matthew Davies as the lone survivor. The report into the cause of the disaster was undertaken by the Inspector of Mines, which concluded that the explosion was caused by illegal use of blasting material underground. Shortly before the explosion occurred, the master sinker had requested blasting cable and a battery to charge the shot. The manager, Mr. Meredith, had entered the mine a quarter of an hour before the explosion and was amongst the list of fatalities.

Amongst the messages of condolences received at Wattstown was a message from King Edward VII. On the day of the funeral, the streets were lined by thousands of mourners and the funeral cortège was reported as being over four miles (6 km) long.

== Sport and leisure ==
Wattstown is home to Wattstown RFC, a rugby union club with over a hundred years of history.

Wattstown had a Bowls team from 1921 to 2016. The bowling green is located in Wattstown Park. Players from the club represented Wales at international level.
