= Harold Brown (athlete) =

Canadian long jumper (1917–2002)

Medal record

Men's Athletics

Representing Canada

British Empire Games
Gold medal – first place	1938 Sydney	Long jump

Harold "Hal" Brown (1917 – January 2002) was a Canadian athlete who competed in the 1938 British Empire Games.

At the 1938 Empire Games he won the gold medal in the long jump event. He also finished fourth in the javelin throw competition and fifth in the triple jump contest.
