= Percy Watson (bowls) =

Northern Irish international lawn bowler

Personal information
- Nationality: Northern Irish
- Born: 1894
- Died: before 1990

Sport
- Club: Cavehill BC
Medal record
Representing Northern Ireland
Commonwealth Games
Silver medal – second place	1934 London	fours
Gold medal – first place	1954 Vancouver	pairs

Percy Thomson Watson (1894 – ?), was a Northern Ireland international lawn bowler.

== Bowls career ==
Watson was a member of the Cavehill Bowls Club.

He represented Northern Ireland in four Commonwealth Games. He won a silver medal in the fours at the 1934 British Empire Games in London. After the games he was given a civic reception by the Lord and Mayor and Lady Mayoress at the Belfast City Hall.

Twenty years later he won a gold medal in the pairs event at the 1954 British Empire and Commonwealth Games in Vancouver, with William Rosbotham.

He also competed at the 1958 and 1962 Commonwealth Games and won the 1933 and 1938 Irish National Bowls Championships singles.

In addition to his two National singles titles he also won two National pairs titles in 1926 and 1930 bowling for the Cavehill Bowls Club.

== Personal life ==
He was a director of a linen manufacturers by trade and lived in Bedford Street, Belfast. He was married to Margaret who died in 1982.
